= Black in AI =

Technology research organization

- Formation: 2017; 9 years ago
- Founder: Rediet Abebe, Timnit Gebru
- Type: Non-profit Organization
- Headquarters: Palo Alto, California, U.S.
- Website: blackinai.github.io

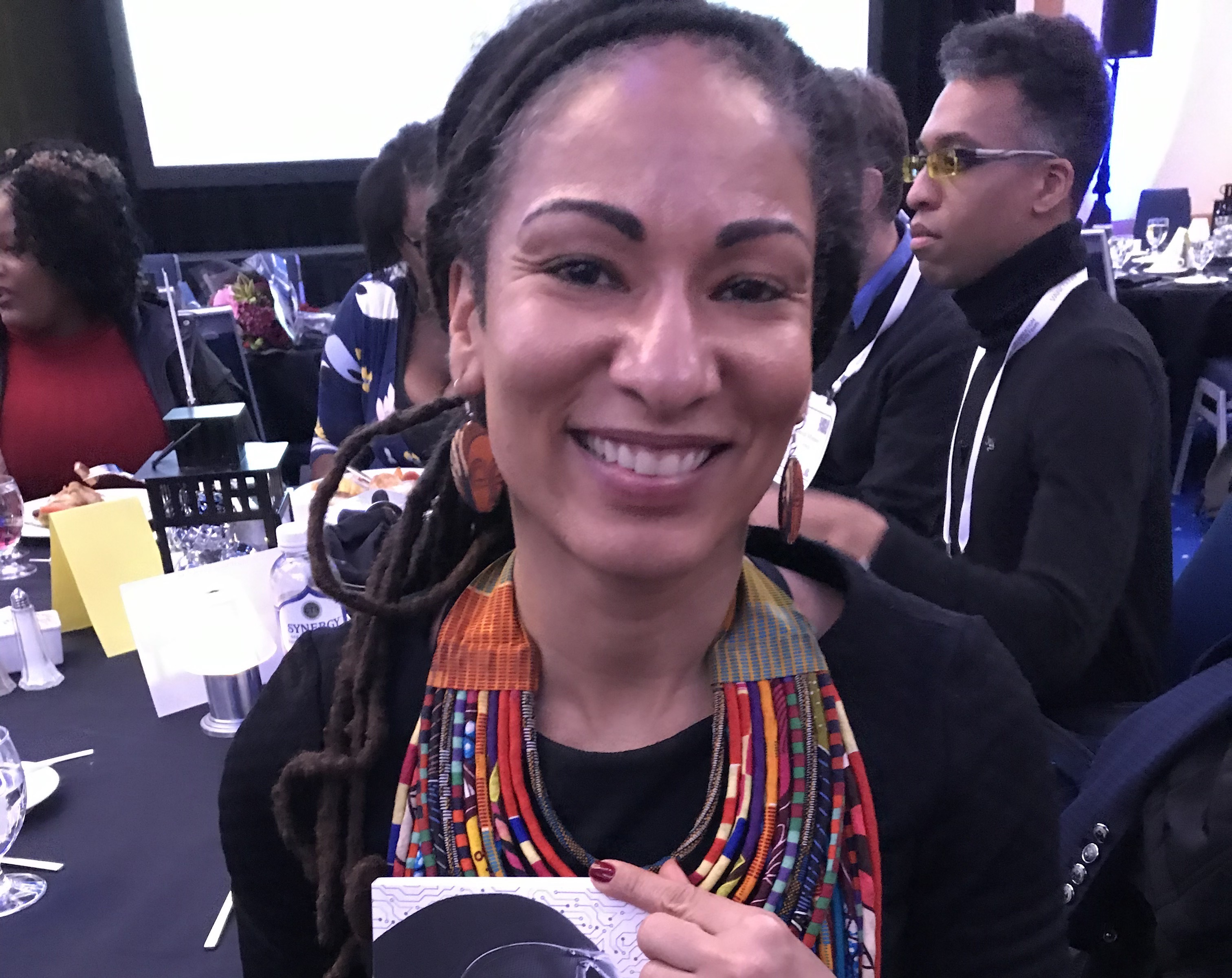
Ruha Benjamin and her book, Race After Technology at the 2019 Black in AI event

Black in AI, formally called the Black in AI Workshop, is a technology research organization and affinity group, founded by computer scientists Timnit Gebru and Rediet Abebe in 2017. It started as a conference workshop, later pivoting into an organization. Black in AI increases the presence and inclusion of Black people in the field of artificial intelligence (AI) by creating space for sharing ideas, fostering collaborations, mentorship, and advocacy.

== History ==
Black in AI was created in 2017 to address issues of lack of diversity in AI workshops, and was started as its own workshop within the Conference on Neural Information Processing Systems (NeurIPS) conference. Because of algorithmic bias, ethical issues, and underrepresentation of Black people in AI roles; there has been an ongoing need for unity within the AI community to have focus on these issues. Black in AI has strived to continue the progress of improving the presence of people of color in the field of artificial intelligence.

In 2018 and 2019, the Black in AI workshop had many immigration visa issues to Canada, which spurred the conference to be planned for 2020 in Addis Ababa, Ethiopia. On December 7, 2020, Black in AI held its fourth annual workshop and first virtual workshop (due to the COVID-19 pandemic).

In 2021, Black in AI, alongside the groups Queer in AI and Widening NLP, released a public statement refusing funding from Google in an act of protest of Google's treatment of Timnit Gebru, Margaret Mitchell, and April Christina Curley in the events that occurred in December 2020.

== Founders ==
Rediet Abebe is an Ethiopian computer scientist who specializes in algorithms and artificial intelligence. She is a Computer Science Assistant Professor at the University of California, Berkeley. She was previously a Junior Fellow at Harvard's Society of Fellows. She was the first Black woman to receive a Ph.D. in computer science at Cornell University. She "designs and analyzes algorithms, discrete optimizations, network-based, [and] computational strategies to increase access to opportunity for historically disadvantaged populations," according to her web bio.

Timnit Gebru was born in Ethiopia and moved to the United States at the age of fifteen. She got her B.S. and M.S. in electrical engineering from Stanford University, as well as a PhD from the Stanford Artificial Intelligence Laboratory, where she studied computer vision under Fei-Fei Li. She formerly worked as a postdoctoral researcher at Microsoft Research in the Fairness Accountability Transparency, and Ethics (FATE) division. She's also worked with Apple, where she assisted in the development of signal-processing algorithms for the original iPad.

== Grants ==
Black in AI received grants and support from private foundations like MacArthur Foundation and Rockefeller Foundation. The organization received $10,000 in 2018 for its annual workshop and $150,000 in 2019 for its long-term organizational planning.

In 2020, during the pandemic, the organization received a grant of $300,000 by MacArthur Foundation in order to provide broad organizational support.

In 2022, Rockefeller Foundation announced $300,000 to fight prejudice in artificial intelligence (AI) across the globe and incorporate equity into this rapidly expanding field.

== Programs ==
"Black in AI supports initiatives in academic development, advocacy, entrepreneurship, financial assistance, and research mentorship programs aimed at increasing the participation and success of Black researchers and practitioners in artificial intelligence."

The Black in AI Academic Program is a resource for Black junior researchers applying to graduate schools, navigating graduate school, and transitioning into the postgraduate employment market. They provide online education sessions, offer scholarships to cover application fees, pair participants with peer and senior mentors, and distribute crowdsourced papers that simplify the application process. They also undertake research projects to investigate and highlight the difficulties that Black young researchers face, as well as push for structural reforms to eliminate these barriers and build equitable research settings. Moses Namara is a Facebook Research Fellow at Clemson University and a PhD candidate in Human-Centered Computing (HCC). He is the mentor for the new Black in AI Academic Program.

During the graduate school admissions season in 2021, Black in AI served more than 200 potential graduate program candidates in some capacity. Furthermore, the organization's study identified greater problems encountered by Black graduate school candidates, such as the high cost of graduate school admissions examinations (GREs), which are known to be biased against those from low-income backgrounds. Black in AI's attempts to encourage institutions to eliminate the obstacles were supported by the findings.

Black in AI is also developing a program to help and connect Black tech startups with investors.

Black in AI also mentors early-career Black AI academics and is forming relationships with Historically Black Colleges and Universities to extend its academic program.

In 2021, Black in AI launched two summer research programs, one for undergraduate internships and another for unconstrained research mentorship, including one aimed explicitly at empowering Black women's AI research projects.

== Conferences and workshops ==
At NeurIPS 2017, the first Black in AI event took place in December 8, 2017 in Long Beach, California. The goal was to bring together experts in the area to share ideas and debate efforts aimed at increasing the participation of Black people in artificial intelligence, both for diversity and to avoid data bias. Black AI researchers had the opportunity to share their work at the workshop's oral and poster sessions.

The second workshop was hosted in Montréal, Canada, on December 7, 2018. According to AI experts, visa issues stymie efforts to make their area more inclusive, making technology that discriminates or disadvantages individuals who aren't white or Western less likely. Hundreds of participants who were supposed to attend or present work at the Black in AI session on Friday were unable to fly to Canada; many of the participants were from African countries.

The third workshop was held in NeurIPS 2019, one of the premier machine learning conferences Vancouver, Canada. The workshop was able to give travel scholarships and visa support to hundreds of academics who would not have been able to attend NeurIPS without the help of sponsors. For instance, Ramon Vilarino of the University of Sao Paulo, who presented a poster at the conference on his study of geographical and racial prejudice in credit scoring in Brazil, would not have been able to attend NeurIPS without the help of Black in AI.

Twenty-four academics from Africa and South America were denied visas to attend this session during the conference, according to Victor Silva, the workshop organizer. He noted that, less than a month before the conference, 40 applicants from both continents had been given visas but that more than 70 applications were still waiting. For the second year in a row, visa restrictions have stopped several African scholars from attending the 2018 meeting in Montreal.

The AAAI announced the first Black in AI lunch, which was held in conjunction with AAAI-19. The lunch was hosted on Tuesday, January 29, 2019. This event was intended to promote networking, discussion of various AI career options, and the exchange of ideas in order to boost the number of Black researchers in the area.

The fourth Black in AI workshop, which was held in conjunction with NeurIPS 2020, took place the week of December 7, 2020. The workshop was scheduled to take place in Vancouver, British Columbia. Due to the pandemic, the session was held for the first time in a virtual format. Victor Silva, an AI4Society student, served as the event's chair.

The fifth annual Black in AI workshop was also held virtually in 2021. Oral presentations, guest keynote speakers, a combined poster session with other affinity groups, sponsored sessions, and startup showcases was all featured. The goal of the session was to raise the visibility of black scholars at NeurIPS.

== See also ==
- African-American women in computer science
- Algorithmic bias
- Data for Black Lives
- Ethics of artificial intelligence
- Data Science Africa
- Deep Learning Indaba
