= Aerial Africa =

- Narrated by: Ike Amadi
- Country of origin: South Africa
- Original language: English
- No. of seasons: 1
- No. of episodes: 7

Production
- Executive producer: Peter Lamberti
- Producers: Darren Putter; Martin Ferreira
- Running time: 48 minutes
- Production companies: Aquavision TV Productions; Ukwenza Innovations

Original release
- Network: Smithsonian Channel
- Release: July 14, 2017 – May 6, 2018

Aerial Africa is a television series made for the Smithsonian Channel. Each episode is an aerial video tour of a country or region in Africa, in a similar format to Aerial America (2010–19). The narrated show consists entirely of aerial scenes using the Cineflex V14HD gyro-stabilized camera system mounted under the "chin" of a helicopter. It was narrated by Nigerian-American Ike Amadi. The first and only season covered Southern Africa.

== Episodes ==
No.	Title	Original release date
1	"Wild South Coast"	July 14, 2017
Covers the south coast of South Africa.
2	"Spirit of Ubuntu"	2017
Covers Swaziland (since 2018 renamed to Eswatini) and central and eastern South Africa, including Table Mountain, the Cape Winelands, Augrabies Falls, Johannesburg and the Garden Route.
3	"Botswana: Okavango to Kwando"	2017
Botswana from the air.
4	"Western Cape"	2018
South Africa's Western Cape province.
5	"Namibia"	2018
Covers Namibia, including Sossusvlei and Etosha National Park.
6	"Zambia"	2018
Zambia from the air, including Victoria Falls, the Zambezi, Lusaka, the Luangwa Valley, Kafue National Park and the Bangweulu Wetlands.
7	"Kruger National Park"	May 6, 2018
Kruger National Park, located in the northeast corner of South Africa.
