= The AI Con =

2025 non-fiction book

The AI Con: How to Fight Big Tech's Hype and Create the Future We Want
- Author: Emily M. Bender; Alex Hanna
- Language: English
- Subject: Artificial intelligence, technology criticism
- Publisher: Harper; The Bodley Head
- Publication date: 13 May 2025 (US); 22 May 2025 (UK)
- Publication place: United States
- Media type: Print (hardcover)
- Pages: 288
- ISBN: 978-0-06-341856-1

The AI Con: How to Fight Big Tech's Hype and Create the Future We Want is a 2025 non-fiction book by linguist Emily M. Bender and sociologist Alex Hanna. It argues that "artificial intelligence" is a misleading term that obscures ordinary automation while concentrating power in a small number of technology firms. The book was published in May 2025 by Harper in the United States and Bodley Head in the United Kingdom. It was developed alongside the authors' podcast Mystery AI Hype Theater 3000, which critiques exaggerated claims about AI.

== Synopsis ==
The authors present AI as a marketing umbrella that encourages audiences to infer understanding and agency where none exist. They argue readers should treat such language skeptically and to separate specific automated tasks from broad claims of intelligence. The book describes a recurring hype cycle in which corporate narratives justify data and labor extraction, the replacement of human services with cheaper substitutes, and the diversion of attention from present harms to speculative futures. While acknowledging limited uses such as pattern recognition, the authors argue that contemporary systems are best understood as text and media generators shaped by training data and human labor, not as thinking or reasoning entities.

A central theme is the social and environmental cost of scaling these systems, including increased energy and water use, the appropriation of creative work for training, and the outsourcing of ghost work to low-paid data workers worldwide. These costs are linked to workplace effects, with the authors arguing that automation rarely eliminates jobs outright and more often degrades them through surveillance, work intensification, and unpaid oversight. As alternatives to passive adoption, the authors propose concrete responses: asking precise questions about what is being automated and why, demanding transparency about data and evaluation, and practicing what they call strategic refusal when deployment conflicts with evidence or values.

The book also develops a vocabulary for public debate, rejecting both boosterish and doomerish narratives as grounded in the same assumption that AI is a singular, autonomous force. The authors recommend reading strategies such as favoring trusted human sources over automated summaries and using humor to deflate inflated claims. They describe a link between language to policy and power, arguing that precise terminology can help policymakers and the public resist austerity-driven automation and demand accountability for errors and harms.

== Reception ==
The Guardian praised the book's myth-busting approach and its analysis of how hype erodes cultural and civic life by normalizing synthetic media as a substitute for human judgment. Kirkus Reviews described it as a contrarian account that catalogs concrete risks while cutting through speculative predictions. An interview in Business Insider highlighted the authors' accessible frameworks, including their proposal to describe chatbots as conversation simulators and to evaluate systems in terms of values, labor, and evidence. Coverage in GeekWire emphasized the book's call for resistance through collective bargaining, stronger data rights, and a norm of rejecting deployments that fail basic standards of necessity and evaluation.

Some reviews were more critical. A review in LLRX argued that the book's tone could be overly polemical and that it gave limited attention to potential benefits claimed for generative systems. Coverage in the Financial Times focused on Bender's broader public scholarship, situating the book within her long-standing critique of anthropomorphic narratives about large language models and her advocacy for more democratic oversight of automated systems.
