= Deep Learning Indaba =

Machine learning conference

- Status: Active
- Genre: Conference
- Location: Various
- Inaugurated: 2017; 9 years ago
- Most recent: 2025
- Previous event: Deep Learning Indaba 2024
- Next event: Deep Learning Indaba 2026
- Organiser: Local volunteer teams
- Filing status: Non-profit
- Website: deeplearningindaba.com

The Deep Learning Indaba is an annual conference and educational event that aims to strengthen machine learning and artificial intelligence (AI) capacity across Africa. Launched in 2017, it brings together students, researchers, industry practitioners, and policymakers from across the African continent.

== History ==
The Deep Learning Indaba began in 2017 at the University of the Witwatersrand with over 300 participants from 23 African countries, offering tutorials in advanced AI topics and featuring notable speakers like Nando de Freitas. In 2018, it expanded to 650 delegates at Stellenbosch University, introducing parallel sessions to encourage collaboration. The 2019 edition in Nairobi, Kenya, reflected further growth, with increasing sponsorship and support from major tech companies like Google and Microsoft.

List of annual Deep Learning Indaba conferences
Year	Host country	Venue
2017	Johannesburg, South Africa	Wits University
2018	Stellenbosch, South Africa	Stellenbosch University
2019	Nairobi, Kenya	Kenyatta University
2020	Cancelled	Cancelled due to the COVID-19 pandemic
2021	None	None
2022	Tunis, Tunisia	Sup’Com
2023	Accra, Ghana	University of Ghana
2024	Dakar, Senegal	Amadou Mahtar Mbow University (UAM)
2025	Kigali, Rwanda	University of Rwanda
2026	Lagos, Nigeria	Pan-Atlantic University

=== Deep Learning IndabaX ===
Deep Learning IndabaX is a network of machine learning and artificial intelligence events organized locally in countries across Africa. It is an extension of the annual Deep Learning Indaba. Launched in 2018, the program aims to strengthen local AI communities. It does this by supporting workshops, tutorials, research presentations, and networking opportunities run by volunteers in each country. The initiative has grown from 13 events in its first year to many participating countries across the continent. It helps expand access to AI education and community building beyond the annual conference.

== See also ==
- Data Science Africa
- Vukosi Marivate
- Black in AI
