= Aerial America =

- Narrated by: Jim Conrad
- Theme music composer: APM Music
- Composer: Glyn M. Owen
- Country of origin: United States
- Original language: English
- No. of episodes: 72

Production
- Executive producers: Toby Beach, David Royle, Charles Poe
- Producer: Toby Beach
- Cinematography: Thomas C. Miller
- Running time: 44 minutes
- Production companies: Taikuli Productions (California episode); Tusker Television LLC

Original release
- Network: Smithsonian Channel
- Release: July 10, 2010 – December 22, 2019

Aerial America is a television series airing on the Smithsonian Channel. Each episode is an aerial video tour of a U.S. state or destination in the United States. The narrated show consists entirely of aerial scenes using the Cineflex V14HD gyro-stabilized camera system mounted under the "chin" of a helicopter. It features flyovers of historical landmarks, natural areas such as national parks, and well-known buildings and homes in urban areas. The series has aired an episode for each state as well as others that have showcased popular destinations such as Hollywood and small towns in the U.S.

In 2015 the program was nominated for a Webby Award in the "best television website" category.

== Episodes ==
No.	Title	Original release date
1	"California"	July 10, 2010
Zoom above, and below, some of the Golden State's greatest monuments.
2	"Hawaii"	July 17, 2010
The stories and sights of Hawaii's major islands.
3	"Virginia"	July 24, 2010
Been called the New World and the Old Dominion, it's the birthplace of eight U.S. presidents. Join us as we travel across a diverse and rugged landscape into the realm of pirates, the legend of Pocahontas, the source of myths and the heart of American democracy. It's also the site of Williamsburg, perhaps the most ambitious history lesson in America.
4	"Connecticut"	July 31, 2010
Explore the safe harbors, buildings and rich maritime history; the home state of Mark Twain, PT Barnum, and Katharine Hepburn; the exclusive Gold Coast, the Thimble Islands and the historic cities.
5	"Tennessee"	August 7, 2010
From battlefields where hundreds died to Beale Street where musical legends were born.
6	"Vermont"	August 14, 2010
Northern state's green forests, red-painted barns, and sugar maples.
7	"Arkansas"	August 21, 2010
A view of the land of raging rivers, vast wilderness, legends of the Wild West, and where settlers' westward journeys began and the scene of Bonnie and Clyde's most serious crime took place.
8	"Rhode Island"	August 28, 2010
A small state has a lot of history.
9	"Maine"	July 10, 2011
One of the most beautiful states on the Atlantic Coast.
10	"Oregon"	July 17, 2011
From Crater Lake to the Cascade Range to the perilous Pacific coastline, Oregon is full of natural beauty. From Lewis and Clark's search for "land's end" to the thousands of emigrants who arrived via the Oregon Trail, the state has always attracted the adventurous type.
11	"South Carolina"	July 24, 2011
Take flight on a journey that showcases American history, pristine beaches, colorful cities, and wild spaces. From Fort Sumter, where the first shots of the war between the states rang out, to Sullivan Island, the Ellis Island of Slaves, to the cypress swamp where freedom fighter Francis Marion helped turn the tide of the Revolutionary War.
12	"Massachusetts"	July 31, 2011
Home to revolutionaries, a haven for artists, and the birthplace of education and higher learning. From the journeys of pilgrims to the ride of Paul Revere, from the witch trials of Salem to the Curse of the Bambino.
13	"Georgia"	August 7, 2011
Where a great Civil Rights leader's life began, to views of Atlanta's skyline, Augusta's legendary golf course, and the rugged barrier island coastline. From the South's most beloved piece of literature to the United States' "most haunted cemetery".
14	"Washington"	August 14, 2011
Home to some of America's wildest spaces, high-tech industries, and America's oldest Native American tribes. It's a story of mirror opposites: a wet, mountainous, tree-covered west and a dry, flat, open east.
15	"New Hampshire"	August 21, 2011
Amid its mountains, rivers, and colonial villages exists a community of people who take their motto of "Live free or die" to heart. From an infamous poet who favored the road less traveled, to the founders of both the industrial and fast food revolutions, from Concord to White Mountain State Park and beyond.
16	"Maryland & Delaware"	August 28, 2011
The birthplace of the Star Spangled Banner; sites Harriet Tubman, Babe Ruth and the DuPont family made their marks on history.
17	"North Carolina"	September 4, 2011
The Wright Brothers gave the state its slogan "First in Flight"; civil rights leaders in Greensboro; and NASCAR.
18	"New York"	September 11, 2011
Rich with stories of a nation that began long before European explorers discovered its mighty rivers. Explore its amazing beauty, from roaring Niagara Falls to stunning peaks and valleys, to Central Park to its tallest skyscrapers, to an abundance of architectural heritage, to 17th century explorer Henry Hudson. From stories of expansive natural wonders to the city that never sleeps to the day we will never forget.
19	"Louisiana"	January 8, 2012
It's home to both great celebrations and great devastation. From cool jazz to hot cooking, to a vast paradise of wetlands to the giant industries endangering its fragile ecosystems.
20	"New Mexico"	January 15, 2012
Explore the beauty and national treasures, from the Rio Grande, to adobe structures and dormant volcanoes. See what brought Georgia O'Keeffe to here and why she said "If you ever go to New Mexico, it will itch you for the rest of your life.", as well as Billy the Kid, the makers of the atomic bomb and perhaps even visitors from far away galaxies.
21	"Michigan"	January 22, 2012
A Midwestern powerhouse, where one man's assembly lines brought the automobile to America and another man's "Hit Factory" brought the Motown sound to the world. Named after the Native American term for "big lake," it is defined not only by the Great Lakes that shape it, but how its residents shaped America. Discover its diverse history and its visionaries who built empires, started unions, and helped win a World War.
22	"Nevada"	January 29, 2012
It's known as a Wild West state, but there's more to this ancient desert land than the City of Sin. Highlighting its vital role in the shaping of America, from the mines and ghost towns of its gold and silver rush, to its icon of American ingenuity: the Hoover Dam. Discover the highs and lows of its history, and the booms and busts that have defined it as the land of big builders and bigger dreamers.
23	"Colorado"	February 12, 2012
Colorado is a state with a history, marked by war, a gold rush and legendary bank robberies. Through it all, Colorado remains a feast for the eyes.
24	"Mississippi"	March 4, 2012
Take flight on this journey over Mississippi, a land of hospitality, beauty, and complexity.
25	"Pennsylvania"	March 11, 2012
Whether you prefer cheesesteaks or chocolate, Andy Warhol or Rocky Balboa, this aerial tour of Pennsylvania has something for everyone!
26	"Florida"	October 14, 2012
Soar over the metropolis of Miami and the spring break mecca: Panama City. This is a first-class Floridian vacation and you have a window seat!
27	"Kansas"	October 21, 2012
Enjoy this soaring tour through Kansas, the Sunflower State.
28	"Alabama"	November 4, 2012
Buckle up and "Roll Tide" as we journey over diverse landscapes and historical landmarks, that collectively tell the tale of Sweet Home Alabama.
29	"Oklahoma"	November 18, 2012
This flight over Oklahoma the home of famous "Okies" Will Rogers, Brad Pitt, and Geronimo.
30	"Arizona"	December 2, 2012
Explore Arizona's remarkable history and its awe-inspiring landscapes, spectacular sunsets, and infamous gunfights.
31	"Amazing Destinations"	July 14, 2013
Join us on this cross-country tour over iconic and unknown sights, and discover a side of America that you've never seen before.
32	"Montana"	July 21, 2013
Big skies, big adventure, and big spirits in Montana.
33	"Ohio"	July 28, 2013
Take flight over the Buckeye State and witness centuries of American history etched in its soil.
34	"Minnesota"	August 4, 2013
Soar over Minnesota, where the mighty Mississippi begins and the blue Midwestern sky never ends.
35	"Made in the USA"	August 11, 2013
Celebrate The U.S.A's crowning industrial achievements and the people behind them.
36	"West Virginia"	August 18, 2013
This flight across the West Virginia's towering peaks reveals why John Denver called it "almost heaven."
37	"Beyond Hollywood"	August 25, 2013
Join us on a coast-to-coast tour of countless locations made famous by Hollywood's greatest films.
38	"Texas"	February 23, 2014
From humble beginnings to boastful proclamations, see why "everything's bigger" in Texas.
39	"Idaho"	March 2, 2014
Soar over Idaho and explore this state's most unexpected sites, from Hell's Canyon to breathtaking waterfalls.
40	"Kentucky"	March 9, 2014
With its rich history and breathtaking beauty, Kentucky is a stunning, hard-won paradise, best viewed from high above.
41	"Utah"	March 16, 2014
From the unearthly pinnacles of Arches National Park to the blinding white terrain of the Bonneville Salt Flats, Utah has an alien beauty that you must see to believe.
42	"The Dakotas"	March 23, 2014
This lofty journey over the Dakotas highlight the states' grand beauty.
43	"Wyoming"	March 30, 2014
Soar over Wyoming and explore the fertile landscapes that first lured men like Jim Bridger out West in search of furs and game.
44	"Nebraska"	April 6, 2014
Soar above the Cornhusker State's vast farms, towering spires, desolate badlands, and gleaming cities.
45	"Best Small Towns"	April 13, 2014
Join us on a cross-country tour over our nation's most fascinating small towns.
46	"Alaska's Fire and Ice"	July 6, 2014
Find out why everything about Alaska is larger, tougher and more extreme than any other state.
47	"Alaska's Call of the Wild"	July 6, 2014
Answer Alaska's "call of the wild," in a state rife with postcard-perfect beauty and lethal dangers.
48	"Wilderness"	September 7, 2014
Take a cross-country flight over icy landscapes in Alaska's Denali, vast wetlands in Florida's Everglades, and over 100 million acres of badlands, deserts, and mountains.
49	"Washington, D.C."	April 26, 2015
Take off above the city where Lincoln was shot, MLK had a dream, Nixon's scandal broke, and America held its ground.
50	"Wisconsin"	May 3, 2015
Go beyond beer and dairy, and discover the rich history and dazzling natural wonders of Wisconsin.
51	"New Jersey"	May 10, 2015
Take a flight over New Jersey's shores, pines, and boardwalks and discover a land and of unique beauty and dramatic history.
52	"Indiana"	May 17, 2015
Did you know 65% of the U.S. population lives within a day's drive of Indianapolis? Discover this and other secrets of Indiana.
53	"Iowa"	May 24, 2015
Come to the state where the tractor was invented, John Wayne was born, and farmland stretches far and wide.
54	"Missouri"	May 31, 2015
Find out the origins of the pen name Mark Twain, the Missouri Bootheel, and other strange Show Me State stories.
55	"Illinois"	June 7, 2015
Soar across Illinois' wide-open skies and over the Windy City on this breathtaking aerial tour of the Land of Lincoln.
56	"On The Water"	April 24, 2016
Soar above the rivers, wetlands, and other waterways that have given America a legacy of landscapes we still revere.
57	"Puerto Rico & US Virgin Islands"	May 1, 2016
Discover the stories of two breathtaking Caribbean lands and their fascinating paths to becoming U.S. territories.
58	"Natural Wonders"	May 8, 2016
From the Appalachian Trail to the Rockies, and from the Grand Canyon to the Great Lakes, behold America's natural wonders.
59	"The Great Plains"	May 22, 2016
Soar over the Great Plains, home of jaw-dropping landmarks, breathtaking beauty, and heart-stopping forces of nature.
60	"Roadside Attractions"	May 29, 2016
From Plymouth Rock to the PCH, take a coast-to-coast journey and explore America's great attractions of the open road.
61	"Man-Made Marvels"	June 5, 2016
From the Statue of Liberty to the Space Needle and everything in between, soar over America's greatest man-made wonders.
62	"The South"	June 12, 2016
Take flight over a region defined by tobacco roads, Smoky Mountains, Gulf Shores, and rich history.
63	"Trailblazers"	June 19, 2016
Take a cross-country tour over American landmarks made famous by George Washington, Thomas Edison, and more.
64	"New England"	June 26, 2016
Travel across New England's harbors, rocky peaks, battlefields, and more as we celebrate the birthplace of the American Revolution.
65	"The Wild West"	July 3, 2016
Soar over the Alamo, the Oregon Trail, and other landmarks that tell the legendary and unknown stories of the Wild West.
66	"Southern California"	July 10, 2016
Take a sunny, scenic flight over Southern California's beaches, deserts, mountains and sprawling City of Angels.
67	"Northern California"	July 10, 2016
Visit the region that's home to massive earthquakes, redwoods, gold rushes, high–tech, and vineyards.
68	"New York City 24"	June 4, 2017
A flyover tour of the Big Apple includes its five boroughs, Coney Island and Times Square.
69	"Yellowstone"	March 3, 2019
Take flight over Yellowstone's towering mountains, gushing geysers, and multi-colored springs.
70	"Boston 24"	December 8, 2019
From the Citgo sign and the Green Monster to its heroes past and present, this is a sky-high, up-close look at Boston.
71	"Dallas-Fort Worth 24"	December 15, 2019
Take a thrilling ride over Cowboys and Mavericks, the Horseshoe, and other Dallas-Fort Worth marvels.
72	"Great Cities"	December 22, 2019
Embrace the city life on a coast-to-coast bird's-eye look at Boston, New York, Chicago, San Francisco, and more.

== Aerial Cities ==
In 2018 Tusker Television released a spin-off series entitled Aerial Cities. It consists of the episodes "Las Vegas 24", "Miami 24", "San Francisco 24", "Chicago 24", "Seattle 24", and "Los Angeles 24".
