= Ruha Benjamin =

American sociologist

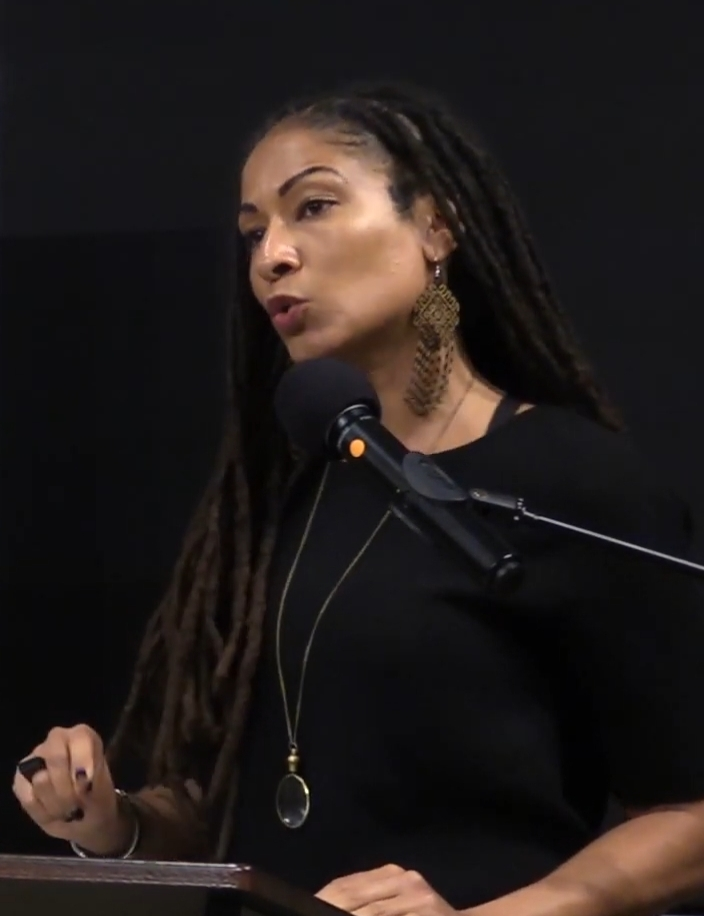
- Born: 1978 (age 47–48); Wai, Maharashtra, India

Academic background
- Education: Spelman College (BA); University of California, Berkeley (MA, PhD)

Academic work
- Discipline: Sociology
- Institutions: Princeton University
- Main interests: Science, technology, and medicine; race-ethnicity and gender; knowledge and power
- Website: ruhabenjamin.com

Ruha Benjamin (born 1978) is a sociologist and professor in the Department of African American Studies at Princeton University. She works on the relationship between innovation and equity, particularly the intersection of race, justice, and technology. Benjamin authored People's Science: Bodies and Rights on the Stem Cell Frontier (2013), Race After Technology: Abolitionist Tools for the New Jim Code (2019), Viral Justice: How We Grow the World We Want (2022), and Imagination: A Manifesto (2024).

In 2024, she was named a MacArthur Fellow.

== Early life ==
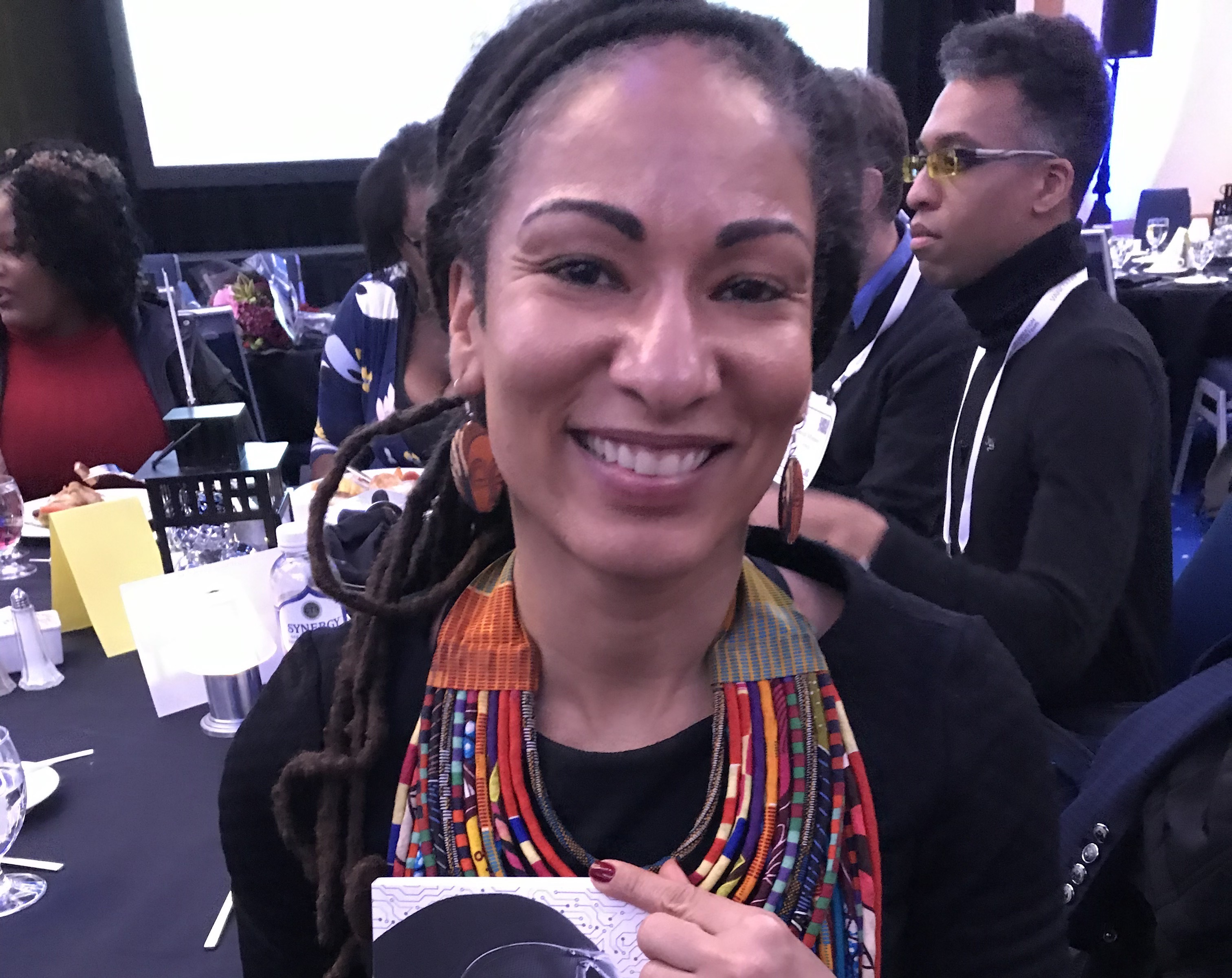
Benjamin and her book Race After Technology at the 2019 Black in AI event

Benjamin was born in Wai, Maharashtra, India, to an African-American father and a mother of Indian and Persian descent.

She lived in Los Angeles, South Carolina, and Majuro.

== Career ==
Benjamin received her Bachelor of Arts in sociology and anthropology from Spelman College before completing an MA and then her PhD in sociology at the University of California, Berkeley in 2008. She completed a postdoctoral fellowship at UCLA's Institute for Society and Genetics in 2010 before taking a visiting faculty fellowship at the Harvard Kennedy School's Science, Technology, and Society Program. From 2010 to 2014, Benjamin was assistant professor of African-American studies and sociology at Boston University.

In 2013, Benjamin's first book, People's Science: Bodies and Rights on the Stem Cell Frontier, was published by Stanford University Press. In it, she critically investigates how innovation and design often build upon or reinforce inequalities, including how and why scientific, commercial, and popular discourses and practices around genomics have incorporated racial-ethnic and gendered categories.

In 2019, her book Race After Technology: Abolitionist Tools for the New Jim Code was published by Polity. In it, Benjamin focuses on ways in which social hierarchies, particularly racism, are embedded in the logical layer of internet-based technologies. She develops her concept of the "New Jim Code", adapted from Michelle Alexander's The New Jim Crow, to analyze how seemingly "neutral" algorithms and applications can replicate or worsen racial bias.

Race After Technology won the 2020 Oliver Cromwell Cox Book Prize awarded by the American Sociological Association Section on Race & Ethnic Relations and the 2020 Brooklyn Public Library Literary Prize for Nonfiction, and was an honorable mention for the 2020 Communication, Information Technologies, and Media Sociology Book Award.

Benjamin is a professor in the Department of African American Studies at Princeton University. Her work focuses on science, technology, medicine, race, citizenship, knowledge, and power. In 2018, she founded the JUST DATA Lab, a space for activists, technologists, and artists to reassess how data can be used for justice. She is also an associated faculty member of the Global Health and Health Policy program and was on the executive committee of the Center for Digital Humanities at Princeton University.

On September 25, 2020, Benjamin was named as one of the 25 members of the so-called "Real Facebook Oversight Board", an independent monitoring group over Facebook. She was selected by the Council for the Advancement of Science Writing to present the Patrusky Lecture in October 2020.

== Honors and awards ==
Benjamin is the recipient of numerous awards and fellowships, including the Marguerite Casey Foundation Freedom Scholar Award and fellowships from the American Council of Learned Societies, National Science Foundation, and Institute for Advanced Study. In 2017 she received the President's Award for Distinguished Teaching at Princeton University.

In 2024, Benjamin was named a MacArthur Fellow.

On April 11, 2024, at the Spelman College's Founders Day Convocation, she received an honorary Doctor of Science degree.

== Publications ==
=== Books ===
- People's Science: Bodies and Rights on the Stem Cell Frontier. Stanford University Press. 2013. ISBN 9780804782975.
- Race After Technology: Abolitionist Tools for the New Jim Code. Polity. 2019. ISBN 9781509526390.
- (As editor) Captivating Technology: Race, Carceral Technoscience, and Liberatory Imagination in Everyday Life. Duke University Press. 2019. ISBN 978-1-4780-0381-6.
- Viral Justice: How We Grow the World We Want. Princeton University Press. 2022. ISBN 978-0-691-22288-2.
- Imagination: A Manifesto. W. W. Norton. 2024. ISBN 978-1-324-02097-4.

=== Articles ===
- (2009). "A Lab of Their Own: Genomic Sovereignty as Postcolonial Science Policy". Policy & Society, Vol. 28, Issue 4: 3.
- (2011). "Organized Ambivalence: When Stem Cell Research & Sickle Cell Disease Converge". Ethnicity & Health, Vol. 16, Issue 4–5: 447–463.
- (2012). "Genetics and Global Public Health: Sickle Cell and Thalassaemia". In Organized Ambivalence: When Stem Cell Research & Sickle Cell Disease Converge, edited by Simon Dyson and Karl Atkin. Routledge.
- (2015). "The Emperor’s New Genes: Science, Public Policy, and the Allure of Objectivity". Annals of the American Academy of Political and Social Science, Vol. 661: 130–142.
- (2016). "Racial Fictions, Biological Facts: Expanding the Sociological Imagination through Speculative Methods". Catalyst: Feminism, Theory, Technoscience, Vol. 2, Issue 2: 1–28.
- (2016). "Informed Refusal: Toward a Justice-based Bioethics". Science, Technology, and Human Values, Vol. 4, Issue 6: 967–990.
- (2016). "Catching Our Breath: Critical Race STS and the Carceral Imagination". Engaging Science, Technology and Society, Vol. 2: 145–156.
- (2017). "Cultura Obscura: Race, Power, and ‘Culture Talk’ in the Health Sciences". American Journal of Law and Medicine, Vol. 43, Issue 2-3: 225–238.
- (2018). "Black Afterlives Matter: Cultivating Kinfulness as Reproductive Justice". In Making Kin Not Population, edited by Adele Clarke and Donna Haraway. Prickly Paradigm Press.
- (2018). "Prophets and Profits of Racial Science". Kalfou: A Journal of Comparative and Relational Ethnic Studies, Vol. 5, Issue 1: 41–53.
- (2019). "Assessing Risk, Automating Racism". Science, Vol. 366, Issue 6464: 421–422.
