= Stories from the Vaults =

Hosted by actor Tom Cavanagh, Stories from the Vaults is a series of 30-minute shows featuring a behind-the-scenes look at the Smithsonian Institution, the world's largest museum complex. The new series, produced by Caragol Wells Productions, showcases the Smithsonian's rarest treasures as Tom Cavanagh meets with the experts behind the Smithsonian and discusses what it takes to preserve these precious artifacts for the generations to come. Stories from the Vaults debuted September 2007 on Smithsonian Networks. The second season premiered Sunday July 12, 2009.

== SEASON 1 ==
=== Episode 1: "Famous Donors" ===
Cavanagh visits with Dr. Hans-Deiter Seus and collections manager Linda Gordon who oversee 580,000 mammal specimens. They discuss the science of tracking environmental and ecological changes and examine the Smithsonian's vast collection of specimens. Cavanagh also stops by to see the Entertainment Collection curator to enjoy a collection of jokes donated by the first woman to enjoy a comedy career in television.

=== Episode 2: "Superlatives" ===
Tom Cavanagh goes in search of the most misunderstood, the best and the tiniest to learn what it takes to stand out in a collection of 142 million objects. Paul Rhymer discusses the art of taxidermy with Tom before Cavanagh heads over to the National Museum of American History for a unique test. In a "cello challenge" Cavanagh has to identify the difference in sound between an ordinary cello and that of a 300-year-old Stradivarius, one of the finest instruments in the world.

=== Episode 3: "No Place Like Home" ===
In "No Place Like Home", Tom examines four unique forms of homes: the earliest space suits, the tipi of the plains Indians, mobile homes, and the life of the roundworm – a parasite able to make its home in almost any type of ecosystem.

=== Episode 4: "Beauty" ===
Beauty comes in many forms and in this episode Tom Cavanagh explores the subject through the perspective of three Smithsonian curators and their views on ants, orchids and the world of advertising.

=== Episode 5: "Firsts" ===
In this episode, Tom Cavanagh looks at some early developments in technology, including the cockpit of a jumbo jet, Thomas Edison's early light bulbs, and some of the first video game consoles.

=== Episode 6: "Life after Death" ===
At the Smithsonian, many researchers and historians find valuable clues about life through the study of death. From a colony of flesh-eating beetles to the idea seeking immortality by posing for a portrait, the Smithsonian presents many ways to answer the question, "Is there life after death?"

=== Episode 7: "Random" ===
The Smithsonian collection is anything but random. Each of its objects has a scope that encompasses answers to questions as yet unasked, from photography, providing a multiplicity of meaning a single image, to the National Zoo, housing animals and DNA for study in future centuries.

== SEASON 2 ==
=== Episode 1: "Let's Eat!" ===
Learn how to cook Native American dishes with the executive chef of Mitsitam Café; discover the origins of the American coffee break at the National Museum of American History and visit the National Museum of Dentistry, where host Tom Cavanagh learns how food takes a toll on our teeth.

=== Episode 2: "Top Secret" ===
The Smithsonian's most compelling mysteries are revealed. Can an artist outsmart the world's top spies? How does a missile filled with mail make a political statement to the world? These questions are answered.

=== Episode 3: "Nature's Vault" ===
The Smithsonian Tropical Research Institute in Panama tracks sloths. Then search the Panama Canal for clues to the creation of the Panamanian Isthmus, and rise sixteen stories atop the rainforest in a construction crane to do bug research.

=== Episode 4: "Crystal Ball" ===
The Smithsonian's Vaults and labs feature designers who have shaped our future, sneak a peek at museum of the future, and talk to scientists helping to preserve the future of the tropical rainforest.

=== Episode 5: "Going, Going, Gone" ===
This episode goes behind the scenes on what might be called "extreme conservation": like saving animals from the brink of extinction; finding new ways to preserve a work of art; or reviving a genre of music. Also covers what Smithsonian experts are doing to protect the best aspects of our world for future generations.

=== Episode 6: "Sex 101" ===
People may not like to talk about it, but sex is everywhere ... even at the Smithsonian. The topic may not be featured in major museum exhibitions, but the vaults and labs of the Smithsonian feature stories about "the birds and the bees." Host Tom Cavanagh goes behind the scenes of the Smithsonian to find evidence of romance and sex.

=== Episode 7: "Villains and Rogues" ===
Explore the crime "scene" at the Smithsonian's Vaults: photographic evidence from the Crime of the Century; everyone's favorite natural villain, the snake; and America's first "Lone Gunman": John Wilkes Booth.
