= Smithsonian Channel =

American cable television channel

- Country: United States
- Broadcast area: United States, Canada, Mexico, Puerto Rico

Programming
- Picture format: 1080i HDTV

Ownership
- Owner: Skydance
- Parent: MTV Entertainment Group
- Sister channels: list of assets owned by Skydance

History
- Launched: September 26, 2007; 19 years ago

Links
- Website: www.smithsonianchannel.com

Availability

Streaming media
- Affiliated Streaming Service: Paramount+
- Service(s): YouTube TV, Hulu Live TV, FuboTV, Philo, Pluto TV, Sling TV

The Smithsonian Channel is an American cable television channel owned by Skydance through its media networks division under MTV Entertainment Group. It offers video content inspired by the Smithsonian Institution's museums, research facilities and magazines.

The channel features original non-fiction programming that covers a wide range of historical, scientific, and cultural subjects. As of February 2015, approximately 33.6 million American households (28.9% of those with televisions) receive Smithsonian Channel. It is also available as a video on demand service, depending on the service provider, and in various Internet streaming and download formats.

The channel was launched as a joint venture of Showtime Networks and the Smithsonian Institution as Smithsonian On Demand in 2006, and later became Smithsonian Channel in 2007. Smithsonian Channel Plus, a US$5 monthly subscription also offering access to the channel's past content library, and incorporating the former Smithsonian Earth streaming service, was launched in 2018. As of the fall of 2020, it was merged into CBS All Access (later renamed Paramount+).

As of December 2023, Smithsonian Channel is available to approximately 39,000,000 pay television households in the United States.

== Programming ==
The Smithsonian Channel features a wide array of programming covering science, nature, culture, history, air and spacecraft, and documentaries. They create everything from long-running series to one-off, in depth specials.

- 9/11: Stories in Fragments talks about the events of 9/11 being released in 2011 and is 52 minutes long.
- 9/11: The Heartland Tapes talks about the events of 9/11 being released in 2013 and is 46 minutes long.
- A-Bombs Over Nevada tells of the events of the atomic bombings over the Nevada Test Site. It released on December 5, 2016.
- Aboard Air Force One is a documentary about Air Force One, an American aircraft that has carried the president of the US since 1954 and became official in 1962. This documentary was released in 2021 and is 44 minutes long.
- Adolf Island - Released in 2019 and is 51 minutes long.Caroline Sturdy Colls looks for a Nazi SS camp constructed on Alderney during the Second World War.
- Aerial America showcases each of the 50 states from the air, with special episodes devoted to small towns, the wilderness, etc. Narrated by Jim Conrad. Related shows are Sky View, featuring areas in western Europe; Aerial Ireland; Aerial New Zealand; Aerial Africa; Aerial Britain; Aerial Greece; Aerial Argentina; Aerial Italy; Aerial Australia; Aerial Mexico; China From Above; Aerial Cities, featuring selected American cities; and Aerial Adventures, with each episode focusing on a different part of the US.
- Soul Revolution hosted by Morgan Freeman premiered November 16, 2008.
- Season two of Stories from the Vaults starring Tom Cavanagh premiered July 12, 2009.
- Mystery of the Hope Diamond – On August 19, 2009, the Smithsonian Institution announced that the Hope Diamond was to get a temporary new setting to celebrate the 50th Anniversary of Harry Winston's donation of the gemstone to the National Museum of Natural History. Starting in September, the 45.52-carat (9.104 g) diamond would be exhibited as a stand-alone gem with no setting. From August 19, 2009, through September 7, 2009, the public was invited to vote online for their favorite Harry Winston designed setting, at SmithsonianChannel.com/hope. The winning setting would be announced this fall and the gem would be shown in the setting starting in May, along with a Smithsonian Networks documentary.
- Soul of a People: Writing America's Story – A National Endowment for the Humanities-funded documentary about the Federal Writers' Project featuring interviews with notable project alumni Studs Terkel, Stetson Kennedy, and American historian Douglas Brinkley. Premiered September 6, 2009.
- MLK: The Assassination Tapes produced by 1895 FILMS for Smithsonian Channel premiered on February 12, 2012, and received a Peabody Award. The winner's citation for the Peabody Award describes the documentary as "[p]ainstakingly configured from rare footage collected at the University of Memphis in 1968...leading up to the murder of the Rev. Martin Luther King, Jr. and its aftermath."
- Terror in the Skies is a four-part British/American television series which premiered on September 29, 2013. The show uses amateur video and photos as well as eyewitness accounts to investigate air disasters and the response to them to make flying safer.
- Air Disasters is a Canadian documentary television program examining air crashes, near-crashes, hijackings, bombings, and other disasters. The series features re-enactments, interviews, eyewitness testimony, computer-generated imagery, and cockpit voice recorder (CVR) transcripts to reconstruct the sequence of events for the audience. The show explains how the emergencies came about, how they were investigated, how they might have been prevented, and any changes that have come about as a result. The series has been airing since 2003, although Smithsonian Networks only began airing the show starting with season 5. Previously, National Geographic had exclusive rights to air the show in the United States.
- Air Warriors is a series covering the F-15 Eagle, the V-22 Osprey, and the AH-64 Apache and the stories of the dedicated pilots and teams who fly and maintain these ultimate air warriors. It premiered on November 9, 2014.
- The Real Story goes behind the scenes of some of Hollywood's biggest movies and displays true stories that inspired some of Hollywood's most famous blockbusters. (Also known as The True Story in the United Kingdom.)
- Secrets is a documentary series airing since 2013

Smithsonian Channel's programming library is currently distributed by Paramount Global Distribution Group.

== Carriage ==
Originally only offered in high definition, the Smithsonian Channel HD began airing on DirecTV's new HD lineup on September 26, 2007. Dish Network had originally added the HD channel on May 12, 2008, until February 1, 2009, when Dish dropped it. Then on December 11, 2015, Dish began to offer the channel again. In 2010, Smithsonian Networks entered into an agreement with Comcast for broadcast of the channel on its Xfinity service until 2020.

Smithsonian Networks is also available on Charter Communications in high definition and standard definition and on Verizon FiOS, Mediacom, and CenturyLink's Prism as part of their Premium and Preferred packages.

The Smithsonian Channel is available on Pluto TV (free streaming service also operated by Paramount) as "Smithsonian Channel Selects", however it is geoblocked from any location outside the USA.

Since 2015, Cox Communications added the channel on at least a few of their systems.

Since 2016, the channel was launched in Singapore on Starhub TV. It started broadcasting in Indonesia on Vidio App, Nexmedia and First Media in 2019.

In addition, full episodes and clips are available on devices such as the iPad, Android as well as streaming media devices such as Roku and Apple TV.

In December 2018, HD test transmissions for the Smithsonian Channel were broadcast on the Astra 2G satellite used by the UK's Sky platform. The channel launched on 12 February 2019 on all major UK platforms.

On July 20, 2019, DirecTV and AT&T U-verse removed it from their lineup due to a carriage dispute with CBS Corporation. Carriage was restored on August 8, 2019.

== Controversy ==
In 2006, Carl Malamud of publishing and sharing non-profit Public.Resource.Org complained that private company Showtime and the publicly owned Smithsonian Institution were entering a contract to establish Smithsonian Networks without sufficient public disclosure. Under the contract, Showtime would be able to deny permission to other media producers wishing access to Smithsonian collections. Documentarian Ken Burns said of this deal "I find this deal terrifying... It feels like the Smithsonian has essentially optioned America's attic to one company".

== Related ==
- Smithsonian Channel (Canada)
- Smithsonian Channel (Britain and Ireland)

== See also ==
- List of documentary television channels
