= Alex Hanna (research scientist) =

Sociologist

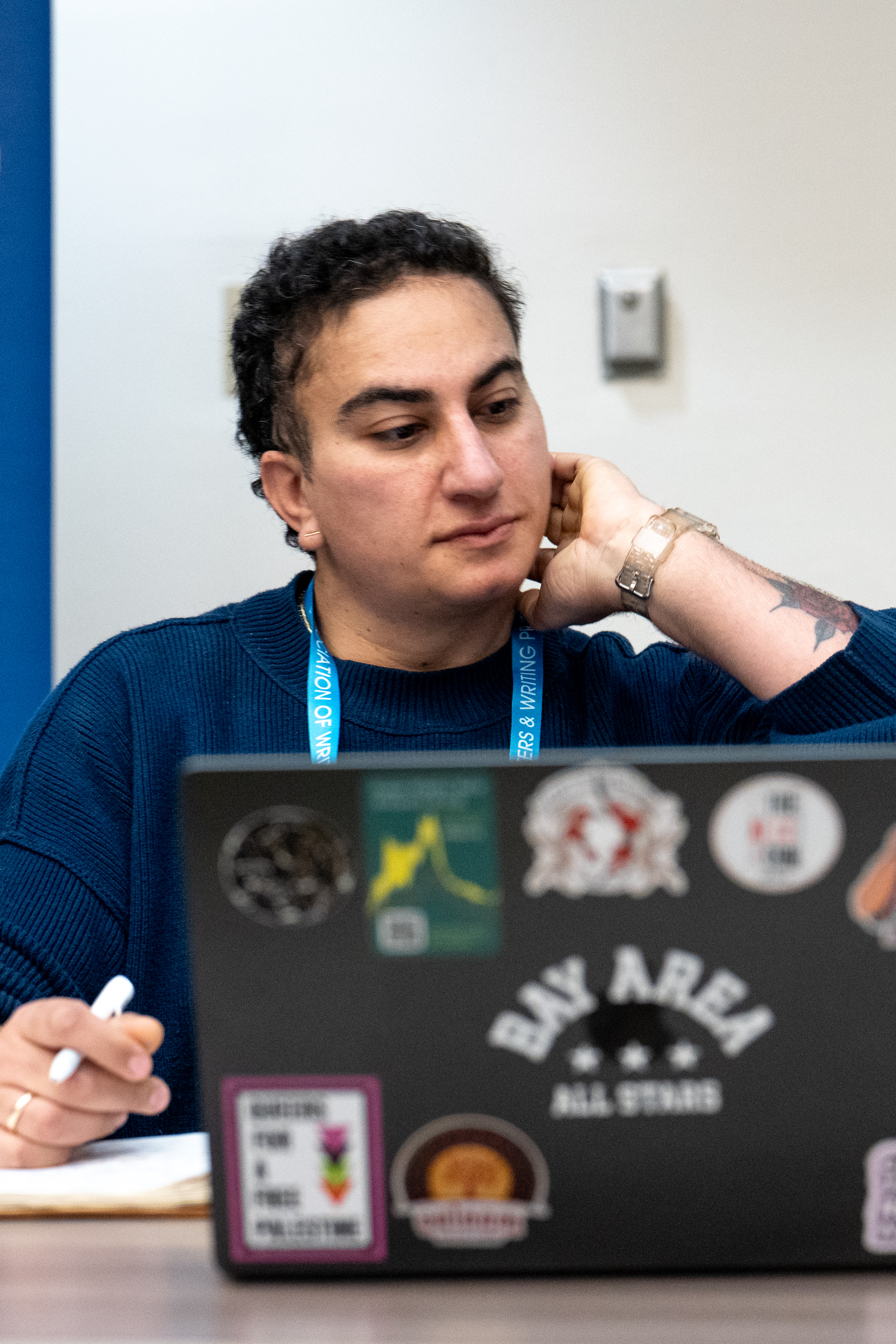
- Hanna at AWP 2026
- Education: Purdue University; University of Wisconsin-Madison
- Known for: Computational social science; Algorithmic bias; Fairness in machine learning
- Scientific career
- Fields: Sociology, Computer Science
- Workplaces: University of Toronto; Google; Distributed AI Research Institute

Alex Hanna is an Egyptian-American sociologist and director of research at the Distributed AI Research Institute (DAIR). She co-hosts the podcast Mystery AI Hype Theater 3000 with linguist Emily M. Bender, and is the co-author of The AI Con: How to Fight Big Tech's Hype and Create the Future We Want. She also serves as a Senior Fellow at the Center for Applied Transgender Studies, and sits on the advisory board for the Human Rights Data Analysis Group. Hanna's work focuses on the data used in new computational technologies and how this data impairs racial biases in social class, race, and gender. She also works in the field of social movements in both the United States and Canada.

== Early life and education ==
Hanna, her mother Demiana, her father, and her sisters migrated from Egypt to the United States. Hanna had an inclination towards computers at an early age and was captivated by the connection between sociology and technology. Hanna attended Purdue University, graduating with a BS in computer science and mathematics and a BA in sociology. She also received an MS and, in 2016, a PhD in sociology from the University of Wisconsin-Madison. Hanna is transgender, and came out while in graduate school at the University of Wisconsin–Madison.

== Career and research ==
Hanna began working as part of the faculty of information as an assistant professor at the University of Toronto Mississauga. She joined Google and worked first as a technical writer and Curriculum Developer and eventually as a Senior Research Scientist on the Ethical AI team. Hanna left Google after her manager Timnit Gebru was fired for speaking out against the dangers of large language models. Hanna believed that Google and their lack of diversity practices fostered disregard for people of color. After Google, Hanna joined Gebru's Distributed AI Research Institute, where she currently holds the position of Director of Research. Hanna has published her research work in the journals Mobilization, American Behavioral Scientist, and Big Data & Society.

Hanna's research primarily focuses on the relationship between people and technology and how it affects inequalities due to race, gender and social economic class.

She is a senior Fellow at the Center for Applied Transgender Studies, and a current member of the Human Rights Data Analysis Group.

In 2022, Hanna created the Alex and Demiana Hanna Pride Scholarship fund for undergraduate sociology majors, citing a desire to "[bolster] queer, trans and people of color in the discipline".

== Awards and honors ==
She received the Wisconsin Alumni Association Forward Award. Hanna was listed by Women in AI Ethics on their 100 Brilliant Women in Artificial Intelligence Ethics list in 2021.

== Selected publications ==
=== Books ===
- Bender, Emily M.; Hanna, Alex (2025). The AI Con: How to Fight Big Tech's Hype and Create the Future We Want. Harper. ISBN 9780063418561.

=== Articles ===
- Berrey, Ellen, et al. “U.S. And Canadian Higher Education Protests and University and Police Responses, 2012-2018.” SocArXiv, 14 Aug. 2024. doi:10.1177/23780231241297447
- Pamela Oliver, Alex Hanna, Chaeyoon Lim; "Constructing Relational and Verifiable Protest Event Data: Four Challenges and Some Solutions". Mobilization: An International Quarterly 1 March 2023; 28 (1): 1–22. doi:10.17813/1086-671X-28-1-1
- Scheuerman, M. K., Pape, M., & Hanna, A. (2021). "Auto-essentialization: Gender in automated facial analysis as extended colonial project. Big Data & Society, 8(2)." doi:10.1177/20539517211053712
- The Annals of the American Academy of Political and Social Science Vol. 659, "Toward Computational Social Science: Big Data in Digital Environments" (May 2015), pp. 225–245 (21 pages) Published By: Sage Publications, Inc.
