= The True Story =

British television documentary series

The True Story (TV) is a documentary series shown on History in the United Kingdom and on the Smithsonian Channel in the US under the name The Real Story.

== Episodes ==
=== 2003 ===
- Bravo Two Zero: The True Story (First Broadcast: 17 April 2003)

=== 2005 ===
- Mystery of the Hunley: The True Story (First Broadcast: 4 January 2005)

=== 2006 ===
- RMS Titanic's Final Moments: The True Story (First Broadcast: 26 February 2006)

=== 2007 ===
- Nostradamus: The True Story (First Broadcast: 9 January 2007)
- Jesse James: The True Story (First Broadcast: 23 January 2007)
- Frankenstein: The True Story (First Broadcast: 6 February 2007)
- Black Hawk Down: The True Story (First Broadcast: 13 February 2007)
- Stonehenge: The True Story (First Broadcast: 20 February 2007)
- Boston Strangler: The True Story (First Broadcast: 27 February 2007)
- Amelia Earhart Conspiracy: The True Story (First Broadcast: 6 March 2007)
- Bermuda Triangle: The True Story (First Broadcast: 13 March 2007)
- Pirates of the Caribbean: The True Story (First Broadcast: 20 March 2007)
- Anastasia Mystery: The True Story (First Broadcast: 3 April 2007)
- Roswell Incident: The True Story (First Broadcast: 10 April 2007)
- Herod the Great: The True Story (First Broadcast: 17 April 2007)
- Philosophers Stone: The True Story (First Broadcast: 24 April 2007)
- Angels and Demons: The True Story (First Broadcast: 1 May 2007)
- Bali Bombings: The True Story (First Broadcast 6 November 2007)
- Jonestown Cult Suicides: The True Story (First Broadcast: 13 November 2007)
- Blood Diamonds: The True Story (First Broadcast: 20 November 2007)
- Olympic Massacre: The True Story (First Broadcast: 4 December 2007)
- Titanic Conspiracy: The True Story (First Broadcast: 11 December 2007)
- Columbia's Final Flight: The True Story (First Broadcast: 18 December 2007)

=== 2008 ===
- Indiana Jones: The True Story (First Broadcast: 16 April 2008)
- James Bond: The True Story (First Broadcast: 23 April 2008)
- Escape from Alcatraz: The True Story (First Broadcast: 30 April 2008)
- Al Capone & the Untouchables: The True Story (First Broadcast: 7 May 2008)
- The Amityville Horror: The True Story (First Broadcast: 14 May 2008)

=== 2009 ===
- The Hunt for the Red October: The True Story (First Broadcast: 26 November 2009)
- Casino: The True Story (First Broadcast: 10 December 2009)
- The Exorcist: The True Story (First Broadcast: 16 December 2009)
- Bourne Identity: The True Story (First Broadcast: 27 December 2009)

=== 2010 ===
- The Silence of the Lambs: The True Story (First Broadcast: 7 January 2010)

=== 2011 ===
- Titanic: The True Story (First Broadcast: 7 January 2011)
- Jurassic Park: The True Story (First Broadcast: 18 January 2011)
- Jaws: The True Story (First Broadcast: 3 March 2011)
- Gladiator: The True Story (First Broadcast: 21 April 2011)

=== 2012 ===
- True Grit: The True Story (First Broadcast: 12 February 2012)
- Saving Private Ryan: The True Story (First Broadcast: 14 February 2012)
- Braveheart: The True Story (First Broadcast: 21 February 2012)
- Apollo 13: The True Story (First Broadcast: 28 February 2012)
- Close Encounters of the Third Kind: The True Story (First Broadcast: 24 May 2012)
- Master and Commander (The Far Side of the World): The True Story (First Broadcast: ?)

=== 2013 ===
- Star Trek: The True Story (First Broadcast: 5 January 2013)
- Platoon: The True Story (First Broadcast: 11 January 2013)
- Scream: The True Story (First Broadcast: 24 January 2013)
