= Vukosi Marivate =

South African computer scientist and AI researcher

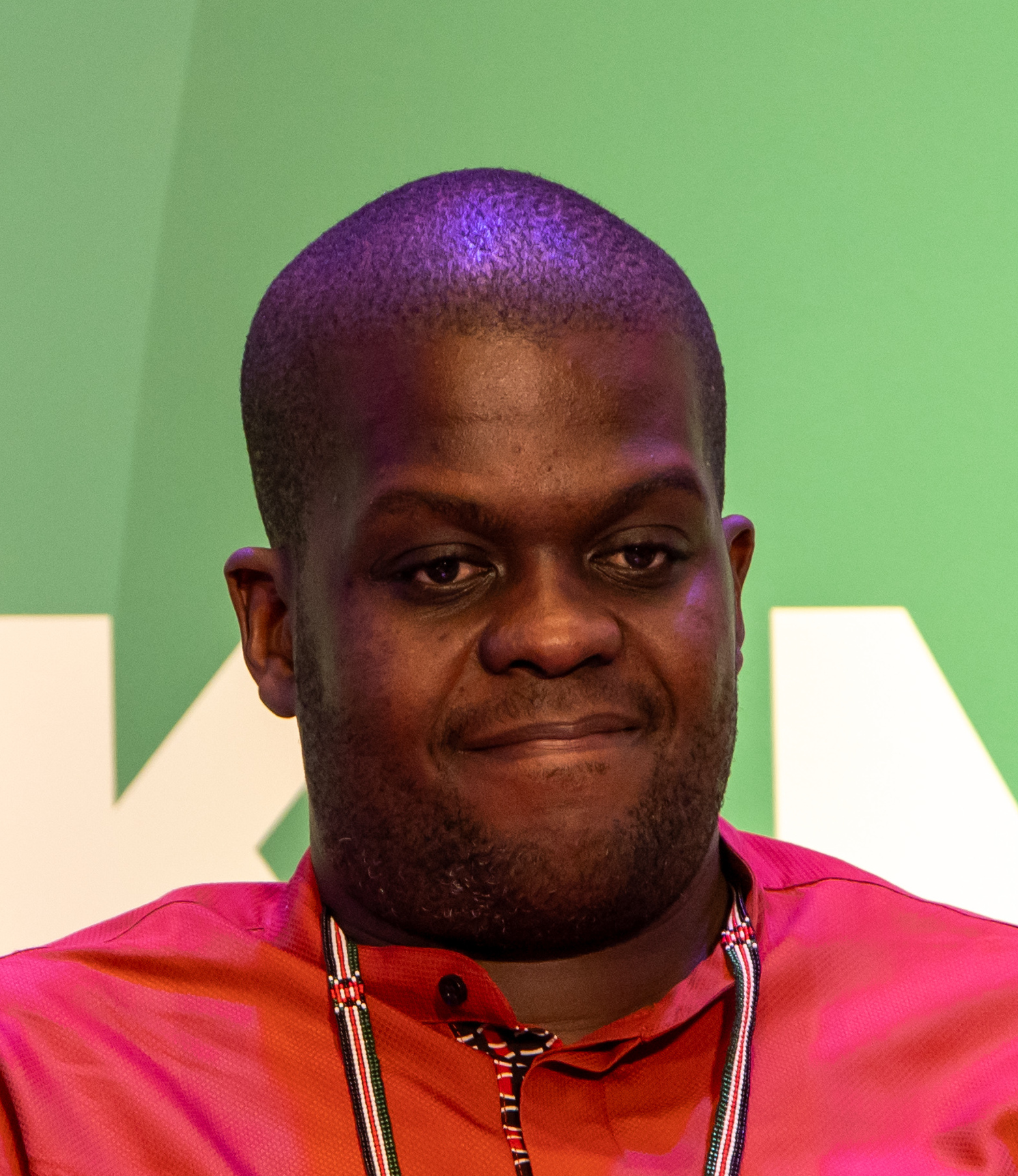
- Born: Ga-Rankuwa, South Africa
- Citizenship: South African
- Known for: Deep Learning Indaba; Masakhane Research Foundation; Data Science for Social Impact (DSFSI); Lelapa AI
- Awards: Order of Mapungubwe (Silver) (2026), Exceptional Young Researcher Award (University of Pretoria)

Academic background
- Education: University of the Witwatersrand (BSc, MSc); Rutgers University (PhD)
- Doctoral advisor: Michael L. Littman
- Other advisor: Tshilidzi Marwala (MSc supervisor)

Academic work
- Discipline: Computer science
- Sub-discipline: Machine learning, Artificial intelligence, Natural language processing
- Institutions: University of Pretoria; Council for Scientific and Industrial Research

Vukosi Marivate (born in Ga-Rankuwa, South Africa) is a South African computer scientist and Professor of Computer Science at the University of Pretoria, where he holds the ABSA–UP Chair of Data Science. He is the Director of the African Institute for Data Science and Artificial Intelligence (AfriDSAI) and leads the Data Science for Social Impact (DSFSI) research group at the University of Pretoria.

He is known for his research in machine learning and artificial intelligence, with a focus on natural language processing for African and other low-resource languages. He is a co-founder of the Deep Learning Indaba, the Masakhane Research Foundation, and Lelapa AI.

In 2026, Marivate was awarded the Order of Mapungubwe (Silver) by the President of South Africa for his pioneering contributions to the field of Data Science and Artificial Intelligence in Africa.

In 2026, he was appointed to the United Nations Independent International Scientific Panel on Artificial Intelligence.

== Early life and education ==
Vukosi Marivate was born in Ga-Rankuwa, a township north of Pretoria, South Africa. He was raised in Ga-Rankuwa in a family with strong community ties in the area, which has been part of his later interest in applying technology and data science to local and urban challenges.

He completed a Bachelor of Science in Electrical Engineering (Information Option) at the University of the Witwatersrand (Wits), where he also obtained a Master’s under the supervision of Prof. Tshilidzi Marwala.

In 2009, he began his doctoral studies (PhD) in Computer Science at Rutgers University in New Jersey as a Fulbright Science and Technology Fellow. He completed his PhD under the supervision of Prof. Michael L. Littman.

He later completed the Harvard South Africa Fellowship Program (2020–2021), including the Program for Leadership Development at Harvard Business School.

He was a Future Professors Programme Fellow, a South African initiative aimed at developing early-career academics into future professors.

== Academic career ==
Marivate is a professor in the Department of Computer Science at the University of Pretoria, where he holds the ABSA–UP Chair of Data Science.

He is the founding lead of the Data Science for Social Impact (DSFSI) research group at the University of Pretoria, which applies machine learning and artificial intelligence to societal challenges, including natural language processing, public health analytics, and development-oriented AI systems, with a focus on low-resource and multilingual African contexts.

He is the lead of the African Institute for Data Science and Artificial Intelligence (AfriDSAI), a transdisciplinary research institute at the University of Pretoria focused on African-centred artificial intelligence research and postgraduate training.

AfriDSAI aims to strengthen Africa’s artificial intelligence ecosystem by linking academia, industry, and government, and supporting research capacity development. The institute has received external funding support, including a US$1 million donation from Google to support African-led artificial intelligence research and training.

== Research and initiatives ==
Marivate’s research focuses on machine learning and natural language processing for African languages, including work on code-switching, multilingual modelling, and data generation for low-resource settings. His work addresses data scarcity in African languages and develops scalable approaches for building language resources for machine learning systems.

He is a co-founder of the Masakhane Research Foundation, a collaborative research community focused on developing open natural language processing tools and datasets for African languages, and a co-founder of the Deep Learning Indaba, an initiative that supports the development of artificial intelligence and machine learning communities across Africa.

He is also a co-founder of Lelapa AI, an African artificial intelligence company focused on developing language technologies and AI systems for African contexts.

Through these initiatives, Marivate has contributed to the development of open datasets, models, and tools for African languages, and has collaborated with academic, industry, and public-sector partners on the application of artificial intelligence systems in real-world settings.

He has contributed to COVID-19 data science efforts in South Africa through the Data Science for Social Impact research group, including public data infrastructure and analytics systems used during the pandemic.

He has contributed expert input to the African Union Development Agency (AUDA-NEPAD) and the African Union High-Level Panel on Emerging Technologies (APET) consultation process that informed the AU Continental Artificial Intelligence White Paper.

He has also contributed to international research and policy initiatives, including the DS-I Africa Consortium.

== Invited talks and keynote lectures ==
Marivate has delivered invited keynote-level talks at major African and international conferences, including:

- African Research Universities Alliance (ARUA) Biennial Conference (2025)
- Southern African Conference for Artificial Intelligence Research (SACAIR 2024)
- AfriCHI 2025 conference

He has also delivered an invited talk at the International Conference on Machine Learning (ICML), presenting research on machine learning for African language technologies and low-resource settings.

== Academic service ==
Marivate has held service roles in major machine learning conferences, including:

- Program Chair, International Conference on Learning Representations (ICLR), 2023
- Workshop Co-Chair, International Conference on Learning Representations (ICLR) 2022
- Social Co-Chair, Conference on Neural Information Processing Systems (NeurIPS) 2020

== Fellowships ==
Marivate has received several fellowships, including:

- Fulbright Science and Technology Fellowship
- Harvard South Africa Fellowship Program
- Future Professors Programme Fellowship
- World Economic Forum Young Global Leaders (2023 cohort) and Aliko Dangote Fellow
- World Economic Forum Global Future Council on Data Frontiers

== Awards and recognition ==
Marivate has received several awards and nominations for his work in machine learning, data science, and African language technologies.

He was a winner, along with his team, of the 2026 National Science and Technology Forum (NSTF)–South32 awards HLT Research Software award, for their work on the TextAugment NLP augmentation library.

He was previously a finalist in the NSTF–South32 Awards Emerging Researcher category.

He was also a finalist for the NSTF–South32 Awards for his role as principal investigator of the COVID-19 Data Repository for South Africa (COVID19ZA) project under the Data Science for Social Impact (DSFSI) research group.

He received the 2025 South African Institute of Computer Scientists and Information Technologists (SAICSIT) Emerging Pioneer Award, for individuals who have played pioneering roles in promoting Computer Science and Information Technology as academic disciplines in South Africa.

He received the University of Pretoria Exceptional Young Researcher Award.

He has also been recognised as one of the Mail & Guardian 200 Young South Africans.

== Professional roles and advisory positions ==
Marivate serves (or has served) on several international advisory and governance bodies in artificial intelligence and data policy, including:

- United Nations Independent International Scientific Panel on Artificial Intelligence
- Board of Directors, Partnership on AI
- Steering Committee, Lacuna Fund
- Africa AI Council (Smart Africa)
- Council on Higher Education (South Africa)

== Selected media coverage ==
Marivate’s work has been featured in Nature, The Conversation, and other outlets covering African artificial intelligence, language technologies, and data science for social impact.

== See also ==
- Deep Learning Indaba
