= Distributed Artificial Intelligence Research Institute =

Research institute in the United States

The Distributed Artificial Intelligence Research Institute (DAIR Institute) is a research institute founded by Timnit Gebru in December 2021. The institute announced itself as "an independent, community-rooted institute set to counter Big Tech’s pervasive influence on the research, development and deployment of AI."

In February 2023, two other members of Google's Ethical AI research group, researcher Alex Hanna and developer Dylan Baker, left Google to join DAIR.

In 2024, DAIR released a report in collaboration with the Weizenbaum Institute and TU Berlin claiming the exploitation of "data workers" (social media moderators, data annotators, etc.) by the tech industry.

== See also ==
- Ethics of artificial intelligence
