= Sheila Bender =

American poet and essayist

- Born: 1948 (age 77–78); Richmond, Virginia, U.S.
- Education: University of Wisconsin; Keane College (MAT); University of Washington (WA)
- Occupations: Essayist; poet; teacher
- Children: Emily M. Bender
- Writing career
- Genres: Poetry, essays, memoir, writing instruction
- Website: www.writingitreal.com

Sheila Bender (born 1948) is an American poet and essayist, best known for her popular books on writing instruction. She hosts a show on KPTZ in Port Townsend, Washington. Her poems, essays, and reviews have appeared in anthologies, newspapers, and literary magazines around North America, including The Bellingham Review, Northwest Passage, Poetry Northwest, The Seattle Times, and the Women's Studies Quarterly. She lives and works in Port Townsend.

== Education ==
Bender graduated from the University of Wisconsin with a degree in English and earned an MAT in Secondary Education from Keane College and an MA in Creative Writing from the University of Washington.

== Works ==
Bender's many books on writing include Creative Writing DeMystified, Writing and Publishing Personal Essays, Writing in a New Convertible with the Top Down, Keeping a Journal You Love, A Year in the Life: Journaling for Self-Discovery, The Writer's Journal: Forty Writer's and Their Journals, and Perfect Phrases for College Application Essays. Her memoir, A New Theology: Turning to Poetry in a Time of Grief, chronicles how reading and writing poetry helped her cope after the loss of her 25-year-old son and find a way to live with love in the spirit of her son. Her newest collection of poems, entitled Behind Us the Way Grows Wider, appeared in 2012.

She has devoted most of her career to the teaching of writing and the improvement of writing instruction. In addition to her dozen books on writing, she has written instructional and feature articles for Writer's Digest magazine and The Writer magazine. She founded WritingItReal.com, where she provides an online instructional magazine for those who write from personal experience and offers individual as well as online group writing instruction.

Bender provided the prompts to the innovative journaling software LifeJournal with Chronicles Software, which helps writers not only generate interesting journal content, but organize and retrieve their ideas. She is also a regular instructor, panelist, and presenter at writing and educational conferences, including at Centrum Foundation in Port Townsend, Washington, and many locations where annual Writing It Real conferences have been held, such as Port Townsend; Oracle, Arizona; Nashville, Tennessee; and Istanbul, Turkey.

Bender is known for her three-step response method that helps authors receive response from trusted listeners, which empowers authors' efforts at revision rather than have them feel their work is being "critiqued" or "torn apart," as the root of that word implies. Authors, she believes, can improve their writing and best fix their drafts after they have heard 1) the words and phrases that stick in the listeners'/readers' ears, 2a) the feelings listeners/readers have after hearing/reading a piece that they feel are in keeping with what the author attempted, 2b) the feelings that are in the way of fully appreciating the work such as places of confusion and feeling left out, and 3) curiosities, where the audience wishes to know.

== Publications ==
=== Books on writing ===
- Writing in a New Convertible with the Top Down: A Unique Guide for Writers (with Christi Killien), 1992. ISBN 978-0-446-39314-0
- The Writer's Journal: 40 Contemporary Writer's and Their Journals, 1997. ISBN 978-0-385-31510-4
- Writing Personal Poetry: Creating Poems from Your Life Experiences, 1999. ISBN 978-0-89879-813-5
- A Year in the Life: Journaling for Self-Discovery, 2000. ISBN 978-0-89879-971-2
- Keeping a Journal You Love, 2001. ISBN 978-1-58297-068-4
- Writing Personal Essays: How to Shape Your Life Experiences for the Page, 2002. ISBN 978-1-58297-178-0
- Writing and Publishing Personal Essays, 2005. ISBN 978-1-893067-05-9
- Perfect Phrases for College Application Essays, 2008. ISBN 978-0-07-154603-4
- Creative Writing DeMystified, 2010 ISBN 978-0-07-173699-2

=== Memoir ===
- A New Theology: Turning to Poetry in a Time of Grief 2009. ISBN 978-1-935437-04-8

=== Poetry ===
- Since Then: Poems and Short Prose, 2022. ISBN 978-1-7373851-3-4
- Behind Us the Way Grows Wider, 2013 ISBN 978-1-935437-75-8
- Sustenance: New and Selected Poems, 1999. ISBN 978-1-56474-300-8
- Love from the Coastal Route: Poems, 1991. ISBN 978-0-9629557-1-6
- Near the Light, 1983. ISBN 978-0-9609476-1-4

=== Anthologies ===
- Boomer Girls, 1999 ISBN 978-0-87745-687-2
- We Used to Be Wives, 2002 ISBN 978-1-56474-390-9
- Washington State Poets Association Anthology, 2004
- Women Writing on Family, 2011 ISBN 978-1-926780-13-9
- Women on Poetry, 2012 ISBN 978-0-7864-8871-1

=== Software ===
- LifeJournal for Writers with Chronicles Software
