= Glyn M. Owen =

English composer

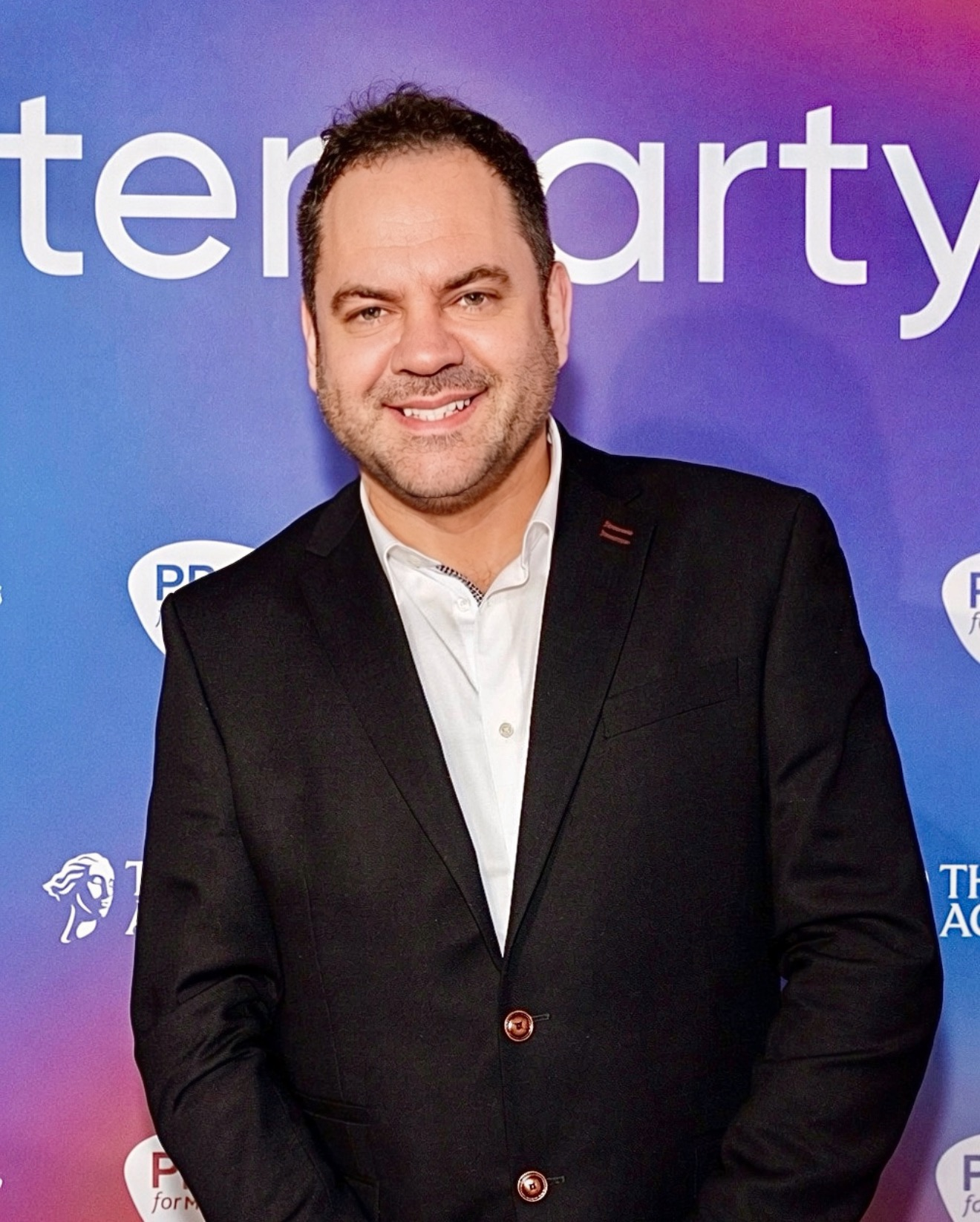
- Owen at PRS/ Ivors Afterparty 26 London
- Born: Worcestershire, England
- Education: Royal College of Music, London
- Alma mater: Film Composition MMUS
- Occupation: Composer
- Awards: Golden Lion at the Cannes Lions International Festival of Creativity
- Website: ComposedBy.me

Glyn M. Owen is an English composer.

He has written music for companies such as Olympus, Volvo, Disney and Ferrari. He has also produced and composed music featuring in British and American TV shows including The Oprah Winfrey Show and the BBC's The One Show.

The music he has composed for commercials has led to winning a number of awards, including a Golden Lion at the Cannes Lions International Festival of Creativity.

== Early life ==
Owen was born and raised in Worcestershire, England. He was educated at the Royal College of Music in London, where he achieved a Master's degree in Film Composition. While studying at the Royal College of Music his tutor was Joseph Horovitz.

== Career ==
=== Adverts ===
Throughout his career, Owen has composed music for a number of companies including Audi, BBC, BMW, Braun, Disney, Ferrari, Gillette, ITV, Mercedes, Nivea, Olympus and Sky Italia. The vast majority of this work has been music for adverts.

Springer & Jacoby International created an advert for Olympus in 2005 titled Red-Eyed Baby, which was directed by Noam Murro. The ad featured a baby with red eyes that advertised one of the latest digital cameras. The music for the ad was composed by Owen and went on to win a Gold Lion at Cannes. He also composed for the ad "Distorted Dogs", which was also created by Springer & Jacoby International and again directed by Noam Murro. This also went on to win a Gold Lion in 2005. During the same year, the advert "Distorted Dogs" for Olympus also won 1st prize for London's International Advertising Award in the same year. It also went on to win Silver at the Epica Awards in the same year.

In 2007, Owen composed the music for a Volvo advert, titled "The Hunt". The advert was created in partnership with Disney and the film series, The Pirates of the Caribbean. It went on to win a Silver Cyber at Cannes.

A number of years later he composed music to launch BMW's newest SUV, the X6. The promo clip was titled "Experience." In the same year he was commissioned to write a 1950s style song for Braun. The commercial titled "Mafia" was filmed especially for the Cannes Lion Festival in 2009. In 2010, Owen composed the music for the Reebok advert, Zigtech. The advert featured Lewis Hamilton.

Owen wrote the music for the Nike teaser film "Dare to be Brazilian" marking the official launch of the 2014 World Cup Brazil kit.

In 2017, Owen created original music, including a re-imagining of Figaro's Aria from The Barber of Seville for the Heineken commercial "The Invention" The vocal solo was recorded in Rome by Italian operatic baritone Pietro Spagnoli.

In 2018 Owen was commissioned to write the music for the Into the Spiderverse global advertising campaign to support the Sony Pictures and Vodafone collaboration - Future Jobs Finder

Owen wrote the music for the Estée Lauder Year of the Tiger 2022 commercial featuring the Chinese actress and singer Yang Mi

=== Documentary ===
Since 2010, Owen's theme tune and music have featured in the global series The World from Above

In 2023 he was commissioned to write the complete score for series 12 which features Nepal The Mustang Valley, The Pyrenees and the USA From Sea to Shining Sea as some of its locations.

=== Television ===
Much of Owens work has featured on television shows. His production music features in Celebrity Juice, Child of our Time, Come Dine with Me, Dancing with the Stars, The Oprah Winfrey Show, Location Location Location, Masterchef, Songs of Praise, The One Show, Keeping up with the Kardashians and the UEFA Champions League.

Late 2015, DeWolfe Music released Owen's album Minimalist Soundscapes The opening track "Life's Reasons" was used by the BBC for the short film featuring Burntwood School who then went on to win the RIBA Sterling Prize that year.

In 2018 Owen wrote the theme tune to BBC2's A Vicar's Life and in 2021 provided the music for the late Paul O'Grady's Saturday Night Line Up working with producer Dan McGrath, No Sheet Music.

=== Other works ===
Owen writes music for various production libraries including KPM, DeWolfe, West One's The Scoring House, No Sheet Music, BAM, Felt Music, Atomica Music in the US and Beatbox in Australia. Recent works include Stories published by DeWolfe Music. Owen also released tracks for the new London label Fully Scored Music including re-imagined covers of Kylie Minogue's Can't get you out of my head and the Pogue's Fairytale of New York featuring the US vocalist Ryan Innes For KPM Music he has co-written with the artist David Eff, vocalist with US band Can't Stop Won't Stop Owen has recently finished tracks commissioned by Atomica Music for coverage of the US Elections in 2024.

He has composed a number of musical idents in his career. In 2003, Owen created the main theme and idents for Sky Italia from launch and they continue to use his channel theme celebrating their 20th anniversary in 2023. Other idents have included ITV3 and ITV's Movie Premiere. Owen also created the music branding for Poland's POLSAT 24 news channel

In 2016, Owen was commissioned by Microsoft Production Studios to write music for a short film featuring developer Saqib Sheikh and his intelligent API for the blind and visually impaired. The film was introduced by Satya Nadella at the Microsoft Build Keynote Day 1. He also created the music for the short film Spread Joy which was played outside of the flagship Microsoft stores in New York and Sydney in December 2017.

=== Film ===
Owens track “Blam” published by APM Music features in the 2014 film Nightcrawler starring Jake Gyllenhaal.

Owen wrote a number of cues for the film 'Alpha Go' which premiered at the 2017 Tribeca Film Festival. It follows Google's DeepMind program playing the 3000 year old game Go using AI against top player, Lee Sedol, in a best of 5 tournament in Seoul.
