= Timnit Gebru =

Eritrean computer scientist (born 1983)

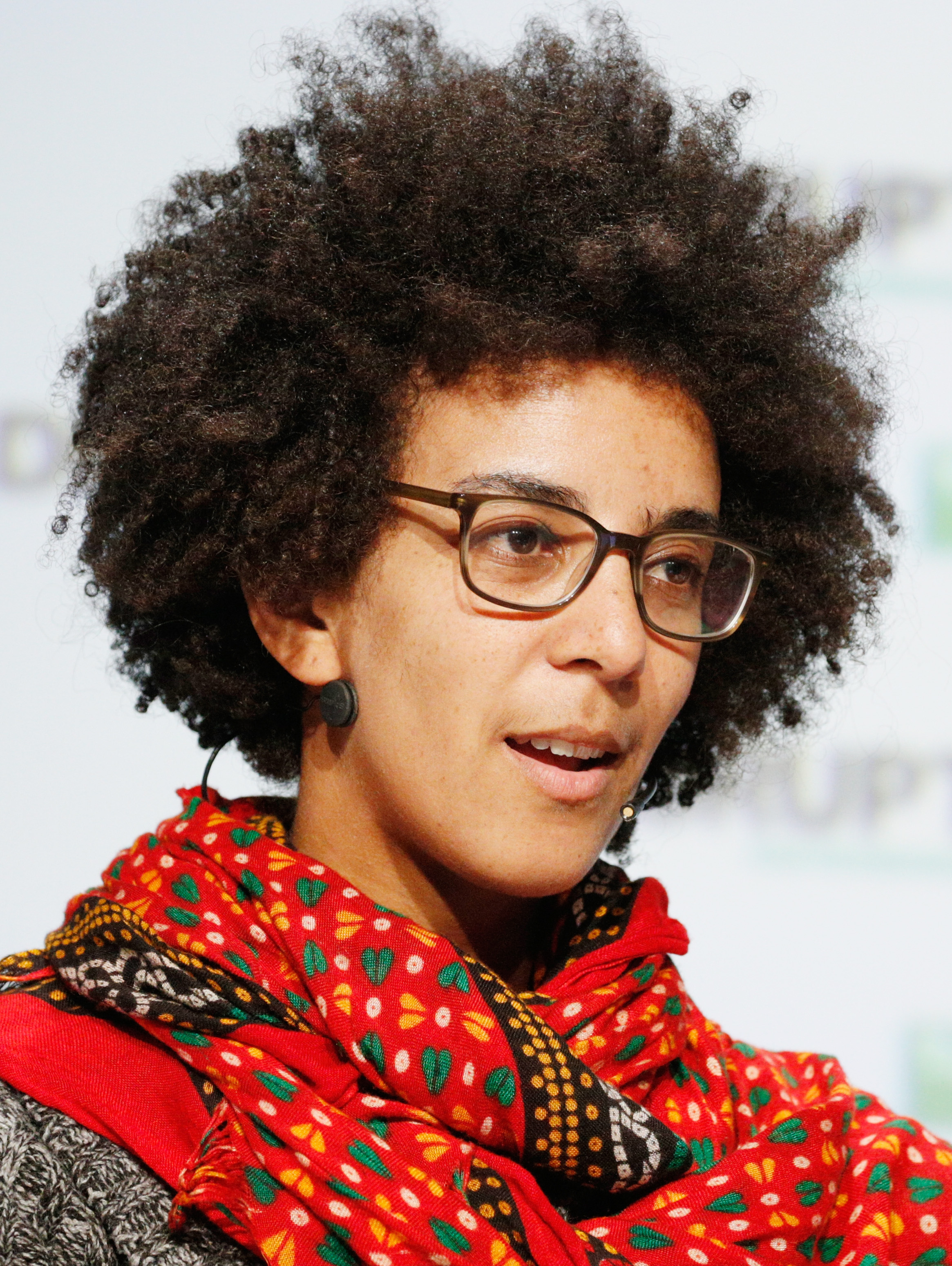
- Timnit Gebru in 2018
- Born: Timnit W. Gebru; 1983 (age 42–43); Addis Ababa, Ethiopia
- Education: Stanford University (BS, MS, PhD)
- Known for: Algorithmic bias Stochastic parrots
- Scientific career
- Fields: Fairness in machine learning
- Workplaces: Microsoft Research; Google; Apple Inc.
- Thesis: Visual computational sociology: computer vision methods and challenges (2017)
- Doctoral advisor: Fei-Fei Li
- Website: ai.stanford.edu/~tgebru/

Timnit W. Gebru (Amharic and Tigrinya: ትምኒት ገብሩ; 1983) is an Ethiopian-born Eritrean computer scientist who works in the fields of artificial intelligence (AI), algorithmic bias and data mining. She is a co-founder of Black in AI, an advocacy group that has pushed for more Black roles in AI development and research. She is the founder of the Distributed Artificial Intelligence Research Institute (DAIR).

In December 2020, public controversy erupted over the circumstances surrounding Gebru's departure from Google, where she was technical co-lead of the Ethical Artificial Intelligence Team. Gebru had coauthored a paper on the risks of large language models (LLMs) acting as stochastic parrots, and submitted it for publication. According to Jeff Dean, head of Google AI, the paper was submitted without waiting for Google's internal review, which then asserted that it ignored too much relevant research. Google management requested that Gebru either withdraw the paper or remove the names of all the authors employed by Google. Gebru requested the identity and feedback of every reviewer, and stated that if Google refused, she would talk to her manager about "a last date". Google terminated her employment immediately, stating that they were accepting her resignation. Gebru maintained that she had not formally offered to resign, and only threatened to.

Gebru has been widely recognized for her expertise in the ethics of artificial intelligence. She was named one of the World's 50 Greatest Leaders by Fortune and one of Nature's ten people who shaped science in 2021, and in 2022, one of Time's most influential people.

== Early life and education ==
Gebru was raised in Addis Ababa, Ethiopia. Her father, an electrical engineer with a Doctor of Philosophy (PhD), died when she was five years old, and she was raised by her mother, an economist. Both her parents are from Eritrea. When Gebru was 15, during the Eritrean–Ethiopian War, she fled Ethiopia after some of her family were deported to Eritrea and compelled to fight in the war. She was initially denied a U.S. visa and briefly lived in Ireland, but she eventually received political asylum in the U.S., an experience she said was "miserable". Gebru settled in Somerville, Massachusetts to attend high school, where she says she immediately started to experience racial discrimination, with some teachers refusing to allow her to take certain Advanced Placement courses, despite being a high-achiever.

After she completed high school, an encounter with the police set Gebru on a course toward a focus on ethics in technology. A friend of hers, a Black woman, was assaulted in a bar, and Gebru called the police to report it. She says that instead of filing the assault report, her friend was arrested and remanded to a cell. Gebru called it a pivotal moment and a "blatant example of systemic racism."

In 2001, Gebru was accepted at Stanford University. There, she earned her Bachelor of Science and Master of Science degrees in electrical engineering and her PhD in computer vision in 2017. Gebru was advised during her PhD program by Fei-Fei Li.

During the 2008 United States presidential election, Gebru canvassed in support of Barack Obama.

Gebru presented her doctoral research at the 2017 LDV Capital Vision Summit competition, where computer vision scientists present their work to members of industry and venture capitalists. Gebru won the competition, starting a series of collaborations with other entrepreneurs and investors.

Both during her PhD program in 2016 and in 2018, Gebru returned to Ethiopia with Jelani Nelson's programming campaign, AddisCoder.

While working on her PhD, Gebru authored a paper that was never published about her concern over the future of AI. She wrote of the dangers of the lack of diversity in the field, centered on her experiences with the police and on a ProPublica investigation into predictive policing, which revealed a projection of human biases in machine learning. In the paper, she scathed the "boy's club culture", reflecting on her experiences at conference gatherings of drunken male attendees sexually harassing her, and criticized the hero worship of the field's celebrities.

== Career ==
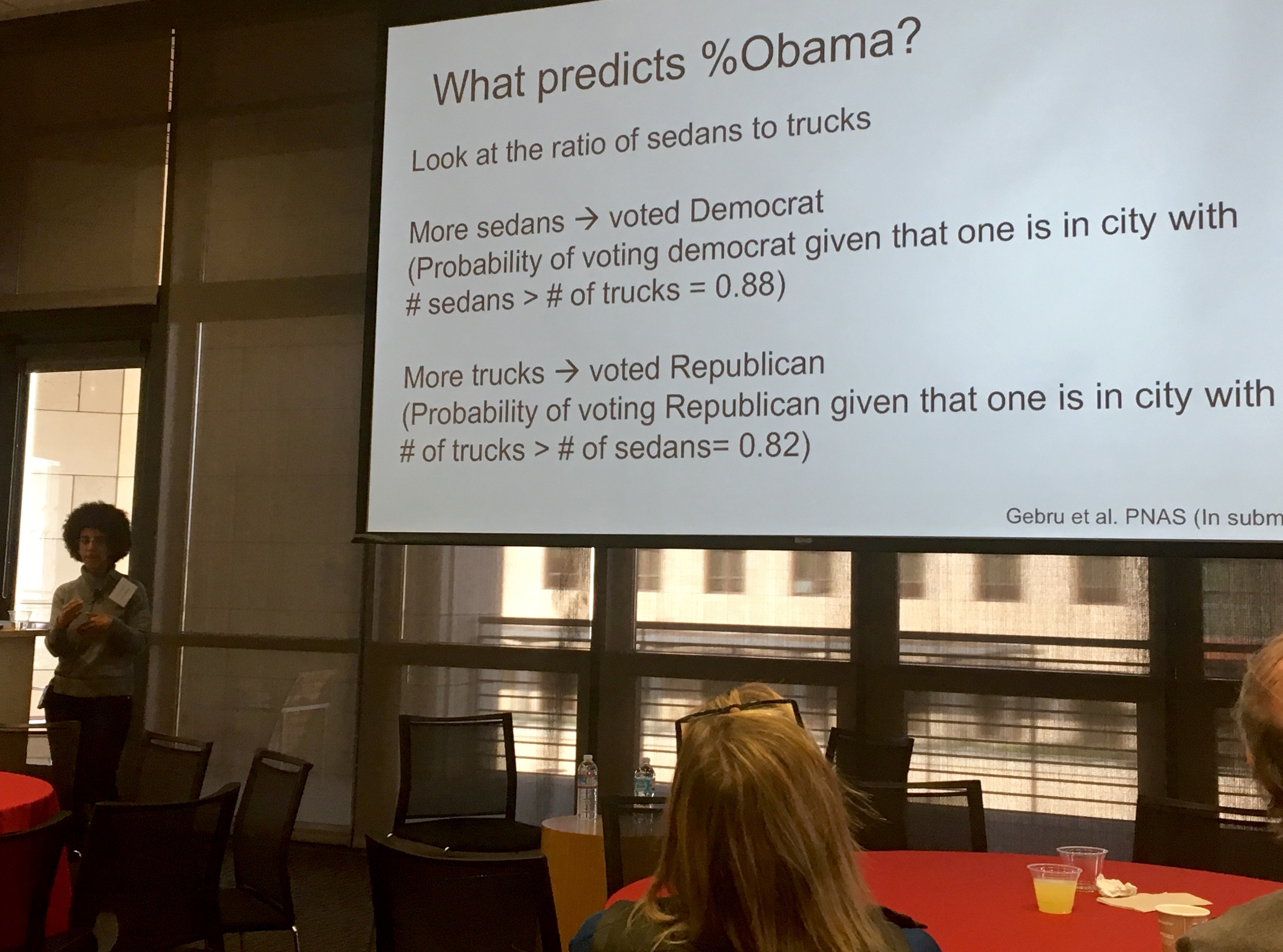
Gebru discussing her findings that one can predict, with some reliability, the way an American will vote from the type of vehicle they drive

=== 2004–2013: Software development at Apple ===
Gebru joined Apple as an intern while at Stanford, working in their hardware division making circuitry for audio components, and was offered a full-time position the following year. Of her work as an audio engineer, her manager told Wired she was "fearless", and well-liked by her colleagues. During her tenure at Apple, Gebru became more interested in building software, namely computer vision that could detect human figures. She went on to develop signal processing algorithms for the first iPad. At the time, she said she did not consider the potential use for surveillance, saying "I just found it technically interesting."

Long after leaving the company, during the #AppleToo movement in the summer of 2021, which was led by Apple engineer Cher Scarlett, who consulted with Gebru, Gebru revealed she experienced "so many egregious things" and "always wondered how they manage[d] to get out of the spotlight." She said that accountability at Apple was long overdue, and warned they could not continue to fly under the radar for much longer. Gebru also criticized the way the media covers Apple and other tech giants, saying that the press helps shield such companies from public scrutiny.

=== 2013–2017: Research at Stanford and Microsoft ===
In 2013, Gebru joined Fei-Fei Li's lab at Stanford, where she combined deep learning with Google Street View to estimate the demographics of United States neighbourhoods, showing that socioeconomic attributes such as voting patterns, income, race, and education can be inferred from observations of cars.

In 2015, Gebru attended the field's top conference, Neural Information Processing Systems (NIPS), in Montreal, Canada. Out of 3,700 attendees, she noted she was one of only a few Black researchers. When she attended again the following year, she kept a tally and noted that there were only five Black men and that she was the only Black woman out of 8,500 delegates. Together with her colleague Rediet Abebe, Gebru founded Black in AI, a community of Black researchers working in artificial intelligence that aims to increase the presence, visibility, and well-being of Black professionals and leaders within the field.

In the summer of 2017, Gebru joined Microsoft as a postdoctoral researcher in the Fairness, Accountability, Transparency, and Ethics in AI (FATE) lab. In 2017, Gebru spoke at the Fairness and Transparency conference, where MIT Technology Review interviewed her about biases that exist in AI systems and how adding diversity in AI teams can fix that issue. In her interview with Jackie Snow, Snow asked Gebru, "How does the lack of diversity distort artificial intelligence and specifically computer vision?" and Gebru pointed out that there are biases that exist in the software developers. While at Microsoft, Gebru co-authored a research paper called Gender Shades, which became the namesake of a project of a broader Massachusetts Institute of Technology project led by co-author Joy Buolamwini. The pair investigated facial recognition software, finding that in one particular implementation Black women were 35% less likely to be recognized than White men.

=== 2018–2020: Artificial intelligence ethics at Google ===
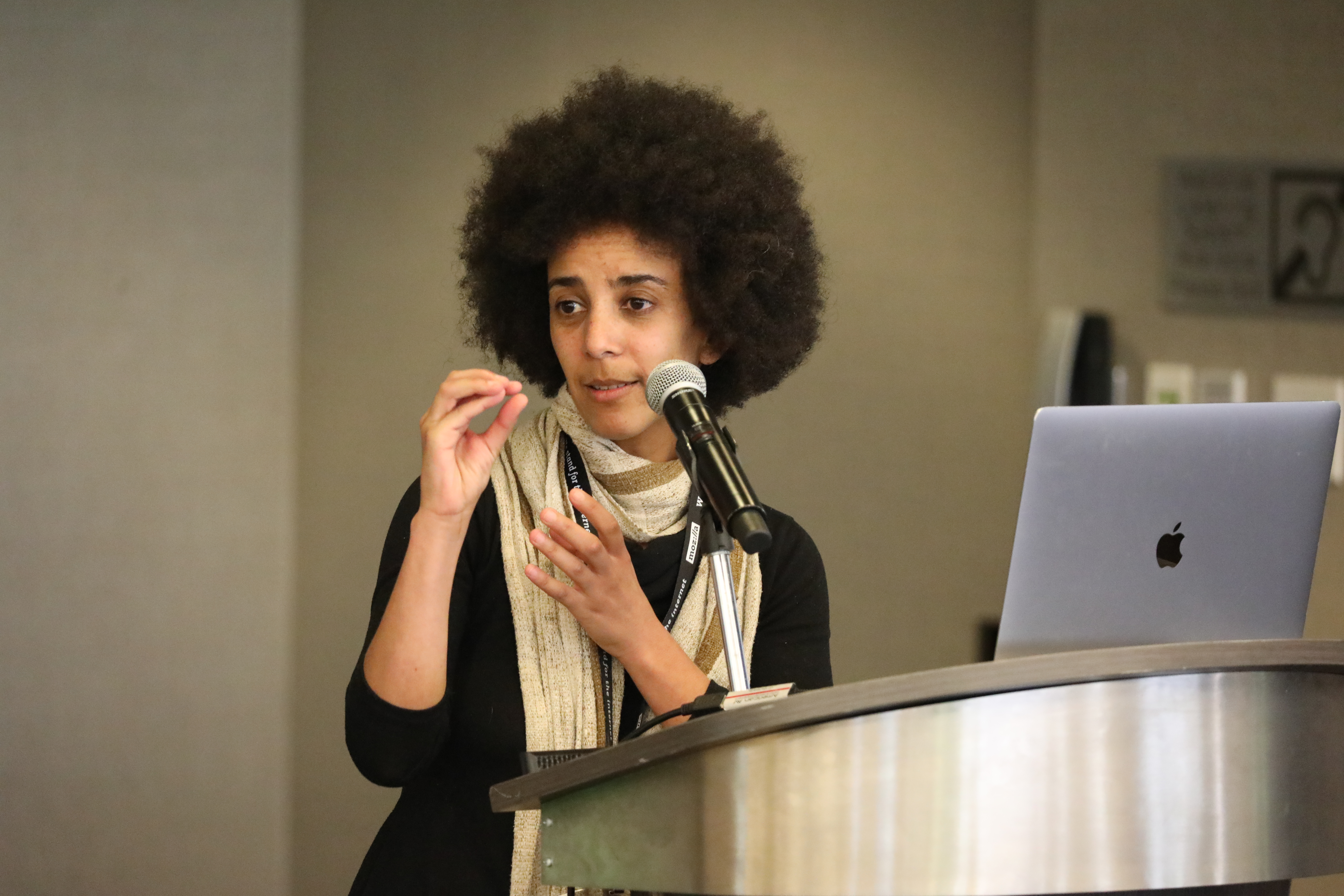
Gebru speaking at The Web Conference 2019

Gebru joined Google in 2018, where she co-led a team on the ethics of artificial intelligence with Margaret Mitchell. She studied the implications of artificial intelligence, looking to improve the ability of technology to do social good.

In 2019, Gebru and other artificial intelligence researchers "signed a letter calling on Amazon to stop selling its facial-recognition technology to law enforcement agencies because it is biased against women and people of color", citing a study that was conducted by MIT researchers showing that Amazon's facial recognition system had more trouble identifying darker-skinned females than any other technology company's facial recognition software. In a New York Times interview, Gebru has further expressed that she believes facial recognition is too dangerous to be used for law enforcement and security purposes at present.

=== Exit from Google ===
In 2020 Gebru and five co-authors wrote a paper titled "On the Dangers of Stochastic Parrots: Can Language Models Be Too Big? 🦜". The paper examined risks of very large language models, including their environmental footprint, financial costs, the inscrutability of large models, the potential for LLMs to display prejudice against certain groups, the inability of LLMs to understand the language they process, and the use of LLMs to spread disinformation.

In December 2020, her employment with Google ended after Google management asked her to either withdraw the paper before publication, or remove the names of all the Google employees from the paper. Of the six authors, only Emily M. Bender was not at the time employed at Google. In response, Gebru sent an email offering to remove herself from the paper if Google provided an account of who had reviewed the work and how, and established a more transparent review process for future research. She continued that she would work with Google on an employment end date after an appropriate amount of time if her conditions were not met. Gebru also sent a second email to an email list for women who worked in Google Brain, accusing the company of “silencing marginalized voices” and dismissing Google’s internal diversity programs as a waste of time. Google did not meet her request and terminated her employment immediately, declaring that they accepted her resignation. Gebru has maintained that she was fired.

In the aftermath, Jeff Dean, Google's head of AI research, sent an email to Google staff addressing Gebru's departure. In the email, he wrote that the paper didn't meet Google's standards for publication because it ignored too much relevant recent research on ways to mitigate some of the problems of bias and energy usage described in it. He also defended Google's research paper process as aiming to "tackle ambitious problems, but to do so responsibly." Roughly 2,700 Google employees and more than 4,300 academics and civil society supporters signed a letter condemning Gebru's alleged firing. Nine members of Congress sent a letter to Google asking it to clarify the circumstances around Timnit Gebru's exit. Margaret Mitchell took to Twitter to criticize Google's treatment of employees working to eliminate bias and toxicity in AI, including its alleged dismissal of Gebru. Mitchell was later terminated after allegedly creating automated scripts to crawl Google's internal servers for evidence of Gebru's mistreatment.

Following the negative publicity over the circumstances of her exit, Sundar Pichai, CEO of Alphabet, Google's parent company, initiated a months-long investigation into the incident. Upon conclusion of the review, Dean announced Google would be changing its "approach for handling how certain employees leave the company." Additionally, Dean said there would be changes to how research papers with "sensitive" topics would be reviewed, and diversity, equity, and inclusion goals would be reported to Alphabet's board of directors quarterly. Google also held a forum for Black employees to discuss experiences with racism at the company, followed by a group psychotherapy session with a licensed therapist. Some employees said the therapy referrals were dismissive of the harm they felt Gebru's alleged termination had caused.

In November 2021, the Nathan Cummings Foundation, partnered with Open MIC and endorsed by Color of Change, filed a shareholder proposal calling for a "racial equity audit" to analyze Alphabet's "adverse impact" on "Black, Indigenous and People of Color (BIPOC) communities". The proposal also requests investigation into whether or not Google retaliated against minority employees who raised concerns of discrimination, citing Gebru's firing, her previous urge for Google to hire more BIPOC, and her research into racially based biases in Google's technology. The proposal followed a less formal request from a group of Senate Democratic Caucus members led by Cory Booker from earlier that year, also citing Gebru's separation from the company and her work.

=== Independent research ===
In June 2021, Gebru announced that she was raising money to "launch an independent research institute modeled on her work on Google's Ethical AI team and her experience in Black in AI." On 2 December 2021 she launched the Distributed Artificial Intelligence Research Institute (DAIR), which is expected to document the effect of artificial intelligence on marginalized groups, with a focus on Africa and African immigrants in the United States. One of the organization's initial projects plans to analyze satellite imagery of townships in South Africa with AI to better understand legacies of apartheid.

Gebru and Émile P. Torres coined the acronym neologism TESCREAL to criticize what they see as a group of overlapping futurist philosophies: transhumanism, extropianism, singularitarianism, cosmism, rationalism, effective altruism, and longtermism. Gebru considers these to be a right-leaning influence in Big Tech and compares proponents to "the eugenicists of the 20th century" in their production of harmful projects they portray as "benefiting humanity". Gebru has criticized research into artificial general intelligence (AGI) as being rooted in eugenics. Gebru states that focus should be shifted away from AGI and that trying to build AGI is an inherently unsafe practice.

== Awards and recognition ==
Gebru, Buolamwini, and Inioluwa Deborah Raji won VentureBeat's 2019 AI Innovations Award in the category AI for Good for their research highlighting the significant problem of algorithmic bias in facial recognition. Gebru was named one of the world's 50 greatest leaders by Fortune in 2021. Gebru was included in a list of ten scientists who had had important roles in scientific developments in 2021 compiled by the scientific journal Nature.

Gebru was named one of Time's most influential people of 2022.

In 2023, Gebru was named by Carnegie Corporation of New York as an honoree of the Great Immigrants Awards. She was awarded as recognition for her significant contributions to the field of ethical artificial intelligence.

In November 2023, she was named to the BBC's 100 Women list as one of the world's inspiring and influential women.

In September 2026, Gebru became one of the winners of the Right Livelihood Award for "challenging concentrated power in artificial intelligence and pioneering digital technology rooted in justice, lived experience and human agency".

== Selected publications ==
- Visual computational sociology: computer vision methods and challenges (PhD thesis). Stanford University (2017)
- Gebru, Timnit; Krause, Jonathan; Wang, Yilun; Chen, Duyun; Deng, Jia; Aiden, Erez Lieberman; Fei-Fei, Li (12 December 2017). "Using deep learning and Google Street View to estimate the demographic makeup of neighborhoods across the United States". Proceedings of the National Academy of Sciences. 114 (50): 13108–13113. Bibcode:2017PNAS..11413108G. doi:10.1073/pnas.1700035114. ISSN 0027-8424. PMC 5740675. PMID 29183967.
- Buolamwini, Joy; Gebru, Timnit (2018). "Gender Shades: Intersectional Accuracy Disparities in Commercial Gender Classification". Proceedings of Machine Learning Research. 81: 1–15. ISSN 1938-7288.
- Gebru, Timnit (9 July 2020). "Race and Gender". In Dubber, Markus D.; Pasquale, Frank; Das, Sunit (eds.). The Oxford Handbook of Ethics of AI. Oxford University Press. pp. 251–269. doi:10.1093/oxfordhb/9780190067397.013.16. ISBN 978-0-19-006739-7.
- Gebru, Timnit; Torres, Émile P. (1 April 2024). "The TESCREAL bundle: Eugenics and the promise of utopia through artificial general intelligence". First Monday. 29 (4). doi:10.5210/fm.v29i4.13636.

== See also ==
- Coded Bias
- Claire Stapleton
- Meredith Whittaker
- Sophie Zhang
