= Race After Technology =

2019 non-fiction book by Ruha Benjamin

Race After Technology: Abolitionist Tools for the New Jim Code
- Author: Ruha Benjamin
- Language: English
- Genre: Non-fiction
- Published: 2019
- Publisher: Polity
- Publication place: USA
- ISBN: 9781509526390

Race After Technology: Abolitionist Tools for the New Jim Code is a 2019 American non-fiction book by Ruha Benjamin focusing on a range of ways in which social hierarchies, particularly racism, are embedded in the logical layer of internet-based technologies. It won the 2020 Oliver Cox Cromwell Book Prize, 2020 Brooklyn Public Library Literary Award for Nonfiction, and Honorable Mention for the 2020 Communication, Information Technologies, and Media Sociology Book Award, and has been widely reviewed.

== Overview ==
Dr. Ruha Benjamin is a sociologist and a professor in the Department of African American Studies at Princeton University. The primary focus of her work is the relationship between innovation and equity, particularly focusing on the intersection of race, justice and technology.

== Background ==
Race After Technology: Abolitionist Tools for the New Jim Code was published by Polity in 2019. In it, Benjamin develops her concept of the "New Jim Code," which references Michelle Alexander's work The New Jim Crow, to analyze how seemingly "neutral" algorithms and applications can replicate or worsen racial bias. A review in The Nation noted that,

“What’s ultimately distinctive about Race After Technology is that its withering critiques of the present are so galvanizing. The field Benjamin maps is treacherous and phantasmic, full of obstacles and trip wires whose strength lies in their invisibility. But each time she pries open a black box, linking the present to some horrific past, the future feels more open-ended, more mutable…This is perhaps Benjamin’s greatest feat in the book: Her inventive and wide-ranging analyses remind us that as much as we try to purge ourselves from our tools and view them as external to our flaws, they are always extensions of us. As exacting a worldview as that is, it is also inclusive and hopeful.”

Upon its release, Michelle Alexander shared her thoughts, amongst others, stating that,

“Race After Technology is essential reading, decoding as it does the ever-expanding and morphing technologies that have infiltrated our everyday lives and our most powerful institutions. These digital tools predictably replicate and deepen racial hierarchies — all too often strengthening rather than undermining pervasive systems of racial and social control.”

== Reception ==
Race After Technology won the 2020 Oliver Cox Cromwell Book Prize awarded by the American Sociological Association Section on Race & Ethnic Relations, 2020 Brooklyn Public Library Literary Award for Nonfiction, and Honorable Mention for the 2020 Communication, Information Technologies, and Media Sociology Book Award. It was also selected by Fast Company as one of “8 Books on Technology You Should Read in 2020.”
