= Margaret Mitchell (scientist) =

American computer scientist

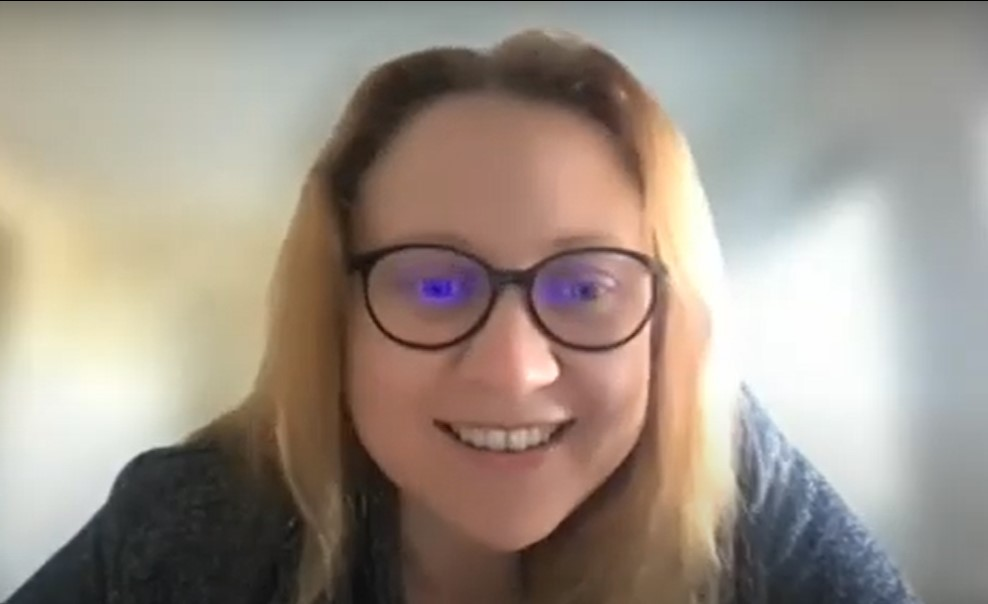
- Mitchell in 2022
- Born: United States
- Other name: Shmargaret Shmitchell
- Education: Reed College (BA); University of Washington (MSc); University of Aberdeen (PhD)
- Known for: Algorithmic bias Fairness in machine learning Computer vision Natural language processing
- Scientific career
- Fields: Computer science
- Workplaces: Google; Microsoft Research; Johns Hopkins University
- Thesis: Generating Reference to Visible Objects (2012)
- Website: m-mitchell.com

Margaret Mitchell (born 18 November 1983) is a computer scientist who works on algorithmic bias and fairness in machine learning. She is best known for her work on automatically removing undesired biases concerning demographic groups from machine learning models, as well as more transparent reporting of their intended use.

== Education ==
Mitchell obtained a bachelor's degree in linguistics from Reed College, Portland, Oregon, in 2005. After having worked as a research assistant at the OGI School of Science and Engineering for two years, she subsequently obtained a Master's in Computational Linguistics from the University of Washington in 2009. She enrolled in a PhD program at the University of Aberdeen, where she wrote a doctoral thesis on the topic of Generating Reference to Visible Objects, graduating in 2013.

== Career and research ==
Mitchell is best known for her work on fairness in machine learning and methods for mitigating algorithmic bias. This includes her work on introducing the concept of 'Model Cards' for more transparent model reporting, and methods for debiasing machine learning models using adversarial learning. Margaret Mitchell created the framework for recognizing and avoiding biases by testing with a variable for the group of interest, predictor and an adversary.

In 2012, Mitchell joined the Human Language Technology Center of Excellence at Johns Hopkins University as a postdoctoral researcher, before taking up a position at Microsoft Research in 2013. At Microsoft, Mitchell was the research lead of the Seeing AI project, an app that offers support for the visually impaired by narrating texts and images.

In November 2016, she became a senior research scientist at Google Research and Machine intelligence. While at Google, she founded and co-led the Ethical Artificial Intelligence team together with Timnit Gebru. In May 2018, she represented Google in the Partnership on AI.

In February 2018, she gave a TED talk on "How we can build AI to help humans, not hurt us".

In January 2021, after Timnit Gebru's termination from Google, Mitchell reportedly used a script to search through her corporate account and download emails that allegedly documented discriminatory incidents involving Gebru. An automated system locked Mitchell's account in response. In response to media attention Google claimed that she "exfiltrated thousands of files and shared them with multiple external accounts". After a five-week investigation, Mitchell was fired. Prior to her dismissal, Mitchell had been a vocal advocate for diversity at Google, and had voiced concerns about research censorship at the company.

In late 2021, she joined AI start-up Hugging Face.

Mitchell is a co-founder of Widening NLP, a special interest group within the Association for Computational Linguistics (ACL) seeking to increase the proportion of women and minorities working in natural language processing; and Computational Linguistics and Clinical Psychology, an annual workshop within the ACL that brings together clinicians and computational linguists to advance the state of the art in clinical psychology.
