= Seeing AI =

Artificial intelligence designed for the visually impared

- Developer: Microsoft
- Initial release: July 12, 2017; 8 years ago
- Stable release: 4.0.1 / 19 February 2021; 5 years ago
- Operating system: Android, iOS, iPadOS
- Size: 302.9 MB
- Available in: 16 languages
- List of languages English, Czech, Danish, Dutch, Finnish, French, German, Greek, Hungarian, Italian, Japanese, Polish, Portuguese, Spanish, Swedish, Turkish
- Type: Application software
- License: Proprietary software
- Website: www.microsoft.com/ai/seeing-ai

Seeing AI is an artificial intelligence application developed by Microsoft for iOS. Seeing AI uses the device camera to identify people and objects, and then the app audibly describes those objects for visually impaired people.

== Capabilities ==
Seeing AI is primarily used to describe short text, documents, products, people, currency scenery, colors, handwriting and light. The app can scan a barcode to describe a product and uses sounds to assist the user in focusing on the barcode. When the app describes people, it attempts to estimate the person's age, gender, and emotional status. Additionally, in a test run by German journalists in December 2019, Seeing AI apparently used some sort of facial recognition system to identify people on photographs by name.

Some functions are performed on the device, however more complex functions such as describing a scene or recognizing handwriting require an Internet connection.

In December 2017, Seeing AI introduced the ability for currency recognition for US and Canadian dollar, British pounds and Euros.

In December 2019, Seeing AI added support for five more languages, Dutch, French, German, Japanese, Spanish.

Seeing AI is available in 70 countries such as Brazil, Argentina, Australia, Canada, Egypt, Albania, Bhutan, etc.

Supported on iPhone 5C, 5S and later best performance with iPhone 6S, SE and later models
