= Aerial video =

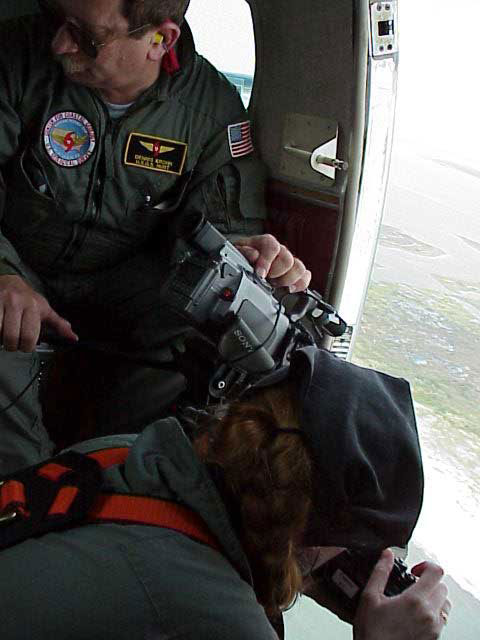
USGS aerial photography crew gathers data following the landfall of a hurricane.

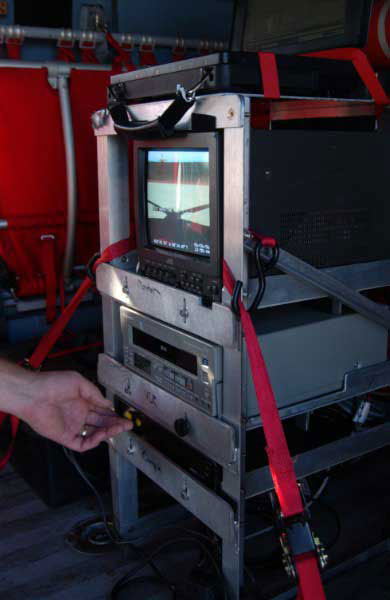
Digital video and recording system used aboard aircraft during coastal oblique video and photography missions.

Aerial video is an emerging form of data acquisition for scene understanding and object tracking. The video is captured by low flying aerial platforms that integrate Global Positioning Systems (GPS) and automated image processing to improve the accuracy and cost-effectiveness of data collection and reduction. Recorders can incorporate in-flight voice records from the cockpit intercom system. The addition of audio narration is an extremely valuable tool for documentation and communication. GPS data is incorporated with a text-captioning device on each video frame. Helicopter platforms enable "low and slow" flights, acquiring a continuous visual record without motion blur.

Innovations in remote sensing cameras have allowed the identification of objects that could not have been previously identified. Pipeline and power corridors and their infrastructure can be documented with digital media recording. Video Mapping System is an example of how this technology is used today.

Since the 1980s, aerial videography has seen increased use in applications where its advantages over traditional photography (lower cost and immediate availability of data) outweigh its disadvantages (poorer spatial resolution and difficulty of analysis due to lack of stereo imaging) (Mausel et al. 1992; Meisner 1986). King (1995) provides a comprehensive review of the evolution of video sensors and their applications, many of which focused on:

1. The measurement of transient phenomena such as wildlife populations (Sidle and Ziewits 1990; Strong and Cowardin 1995) and pest infestations (Everitt et al. 1994);
2. Mapping of dynamic land features such as wetland plant communities (Jennings et al. 1992) and coastal
  land forms (Eleveld et al. 2000);
3. Land cover mapping in remote areas with limited existing aerial photography and poor infrastructure
  (Marshet al. 1994; Slaymaker and Hannah 1997).

== See also ==
- SkySat, satellite video
