= White gaze =

Sociological construct

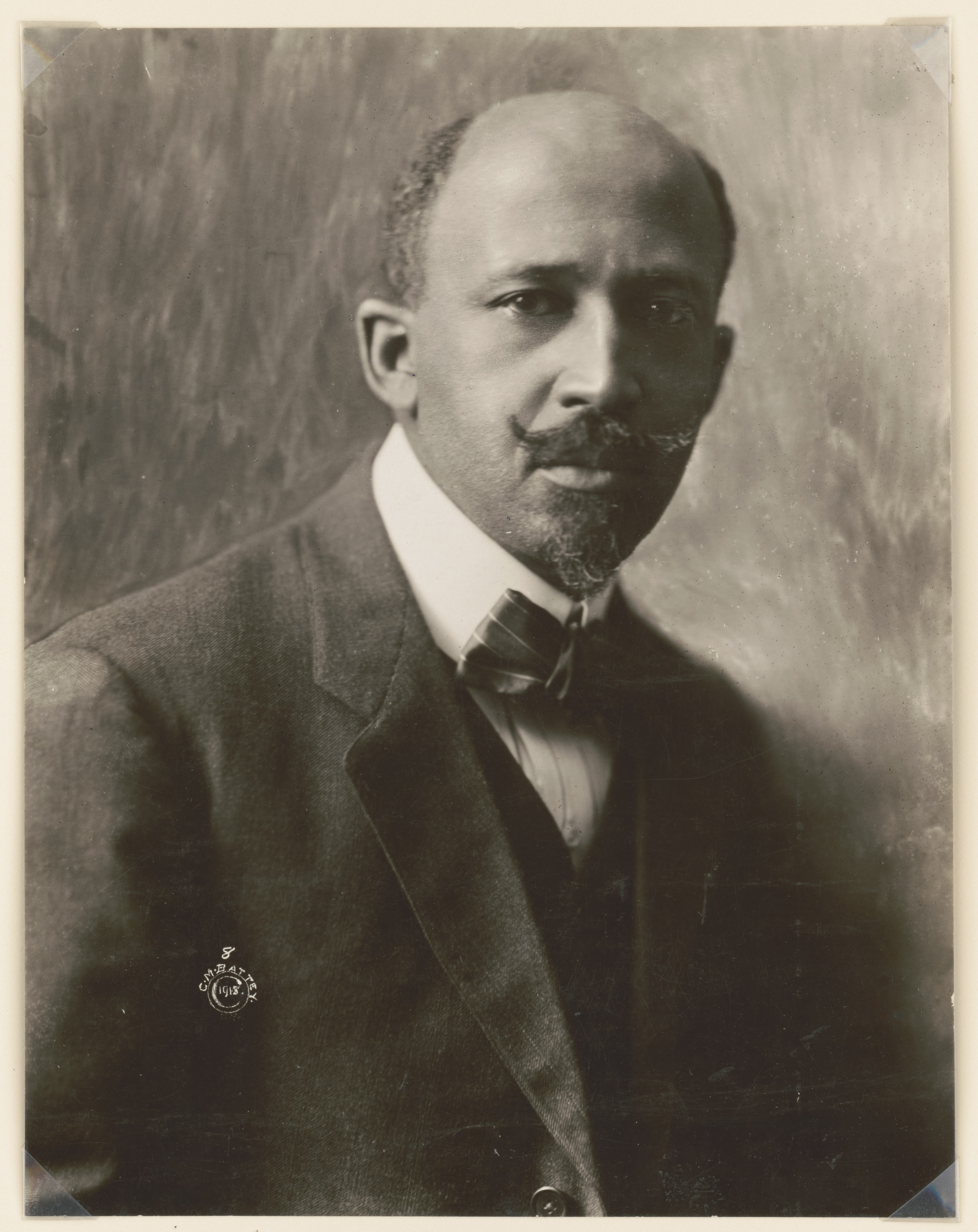
W.E.B. Du Bois

The white gaze is the assumption that the default reader or observer is coming from a perspective of someone who identifies themselves as white, or that people of color sometimes feel need to take into account the white observer's reaction. It manifests across disciplines and issues within literature, technology, entertainment, business, and everyday life. Various authors of color describe it as a voice in their heads that reminds them that their writing, characters, and plot choices are going to be judged by white readers, and that the reader or viewer, by default, is white. The white gaze connects to the concept of standpoint epistemology; a theory surrounding the thought that one's origin, context, and place in the world shapes their perspective. Famous quote by Zora Neale Hurston describes the POC perspective as defined by the white gaze:

"I feel most colored when I am thrown against a sharp white background".

== History ==
W. E. B. Du Bois coined the concept of double consciousness in his book The Souls of Black Folk (1903), which preludes the idea of the white gaze. Double consciousness is theorized as the dual perception African Americans have of themselves. According to Du Bois, Black people navigating Western spaces carry the burden of looking at themselves both through an inner lens, and through the external lens of a white supremacist society: "always looking at one's self through the eyes of others, of measuring one's soul by the tape of a world that looks on in amused contempt and pity."

Toni Morrison popularized the term, and wrote and spoke influentially about rejecting the white gaze. In an analysis of whiteness in American literature, Morrison said, "What happens to the writerly imagination of a black author who is at some level always conscious of representing one's race to, or in spite of, a race of readers that understands itself to be 'universal' or race-free?" In the documentary Toni Morrison: The Pieces I Am, she calls it “The little white man that sits on your shoulder and checks out everything you do or say. You sort of knock him off and you’re free."

Zora Neale Hurston - Author of "How it Feels to be Colored Me"

Penguin Blacktop children's writer L. J. Alonge described it in terms of writing "a scene about two kids trying to dine-and-dash, something I'd done, and stop to wonder if I was playing into narratives about 'black criminality.' I'd try to write a scene about a kid getting into a fight, something else I'd done, and feel like I was fueling ideas about 'black-on-black violence.'"

The Pulitzer prize-winning play Fairview, by Jackie Sibblies Drury, focuses on the white gaze; the play's title is a play on the phrase. Hannah Miao, reviewing it, describes the White gaze as "being watched from a lens of otherness that is sometimes violently obvious, and sometimes so subtle that you find yourself wondering whether you made it up entirely. It is fetishization and repulsion, appropriation and persecution, misrepresentation and erasure, all at once."

Frantz Fanon described how the white gaze positions black people in a perception of being inferior in Black Skin, White Masks.

== White Gaze in Technology ==
Machine bias connects to white gaze, it is a term that refers to the influence of structural bias in tech development and the affects it has on usability, especially for marginalized users.

MIT researcher Joy Buolamwini is the founder of the Algorithmic Justice League and coined the term "coded gaze". The coded gaze refers to the manifestation of prejudices within the field of technology, holding those in power accountable. Her work with the Algorithmic Justice League combats bias in technological development.

The documentary Coded Bias focuses on the work of Buolamwini within the realm of the white gaze in technology, as she advocates for justice in the algorithm.

The problem of the "racist hand soap dispenser" went viral in 2017 due to a video of a Black man struggling to use an automatic soap dispenser because the sensor would not pick up on his dark skin (though his white counterpart did not have the same issue).

Machine bias been present in issues of racial profiling, with technological error resulting in wrongful incarceration and punishment, specifically toward Black and Brown people. In 2020, Robert Julian-Borchak Williams was arrested by Detroit police after being wrongfully identified by Facial Recognition Technology (FRT) as the culprit of a 2018 robbery.

A 2018 exhibit at California Institute of Integral Studies called White Gaze investigated "the role of photography, and specifically the images of National Geographic, in reinforcing racist hierarchies in the cultural imaginary of the West".

== White Gaze in the Workplace ==
In 2017, the Twitter movement #BlackWomenAtWork began trending after Bill O'Reilly made a controversial comment about the hair of Congresswoman Maxine Waters. This hashtag became a place for Black women to share their experiences with the white gaze in the workplace, especially the double standard it enforces. These double standards include harmful stereotypes and assumptions about Black women, emphasis on white focused beauty standards, and the exploitation of Black women's ideas and work.

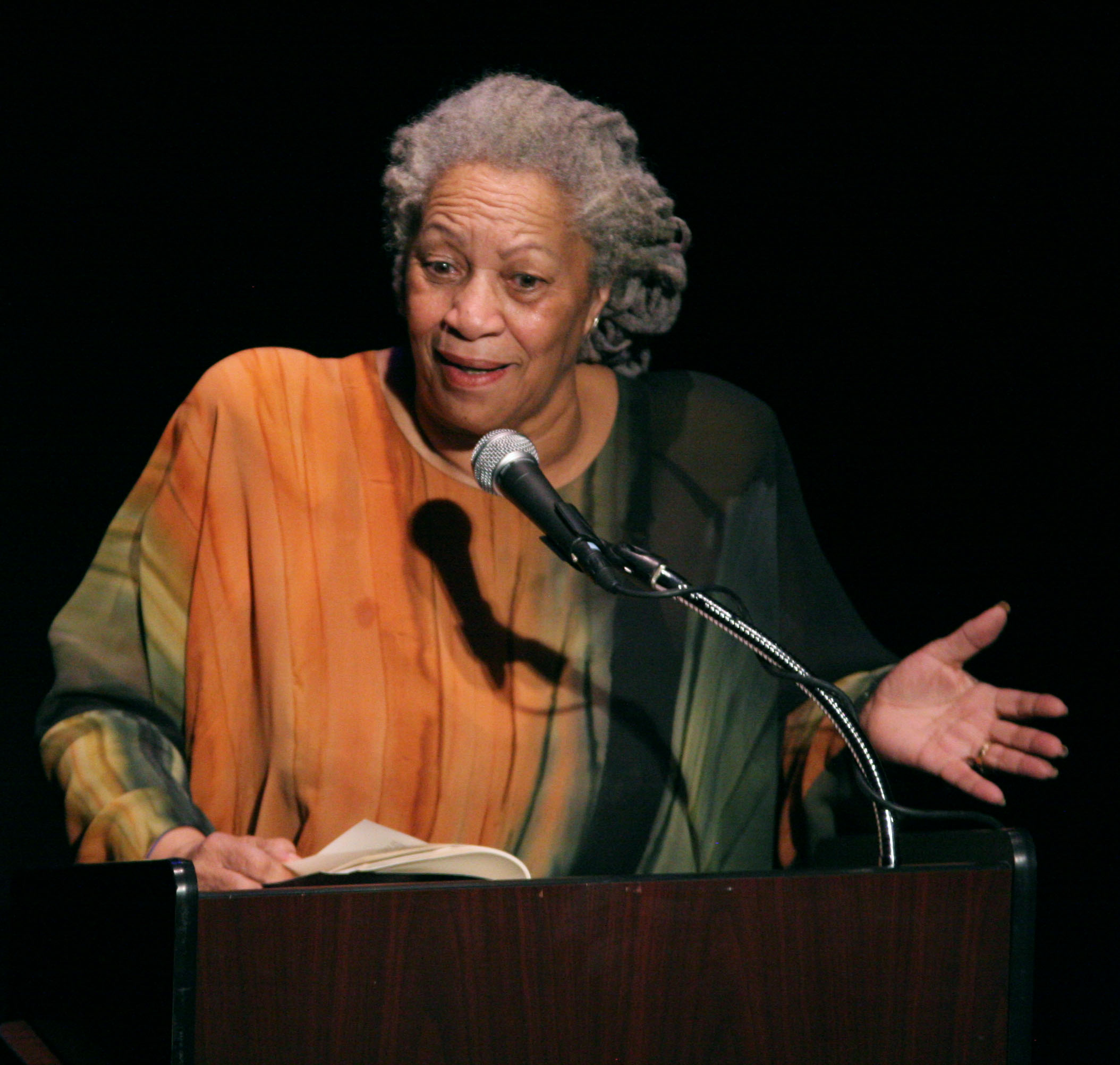
Toni Morrison - African American author known for popularizing the term "white gaze"

Hair discrimination in the workplace targets Black employees and enforces white beauty standards through deeming Black hairstyles as "unprofessional". Oftentimes, uniform policies are placed for the assumed white worker, leaving issues for workers of color that may be unable to conform to some of these policies.

The "bamboo ceiling" stereotype targets Asian employees, operating under the assumption that they are not capable of leadership.

== In the USA vs. in Africa ==
Dana Williams, president of the Toni Morrison Society, noted that the concept was a Western construct, and that in the mid-20th century African writers wrote stories on their own terms. In the US at the same time, according to Williams, black writers writing about black subjects "were always thinking about it in the context of race and white people reading".

== See also ==
- Gaze
- Imperial gaze
- Male gaze
