= Tawana Petty =

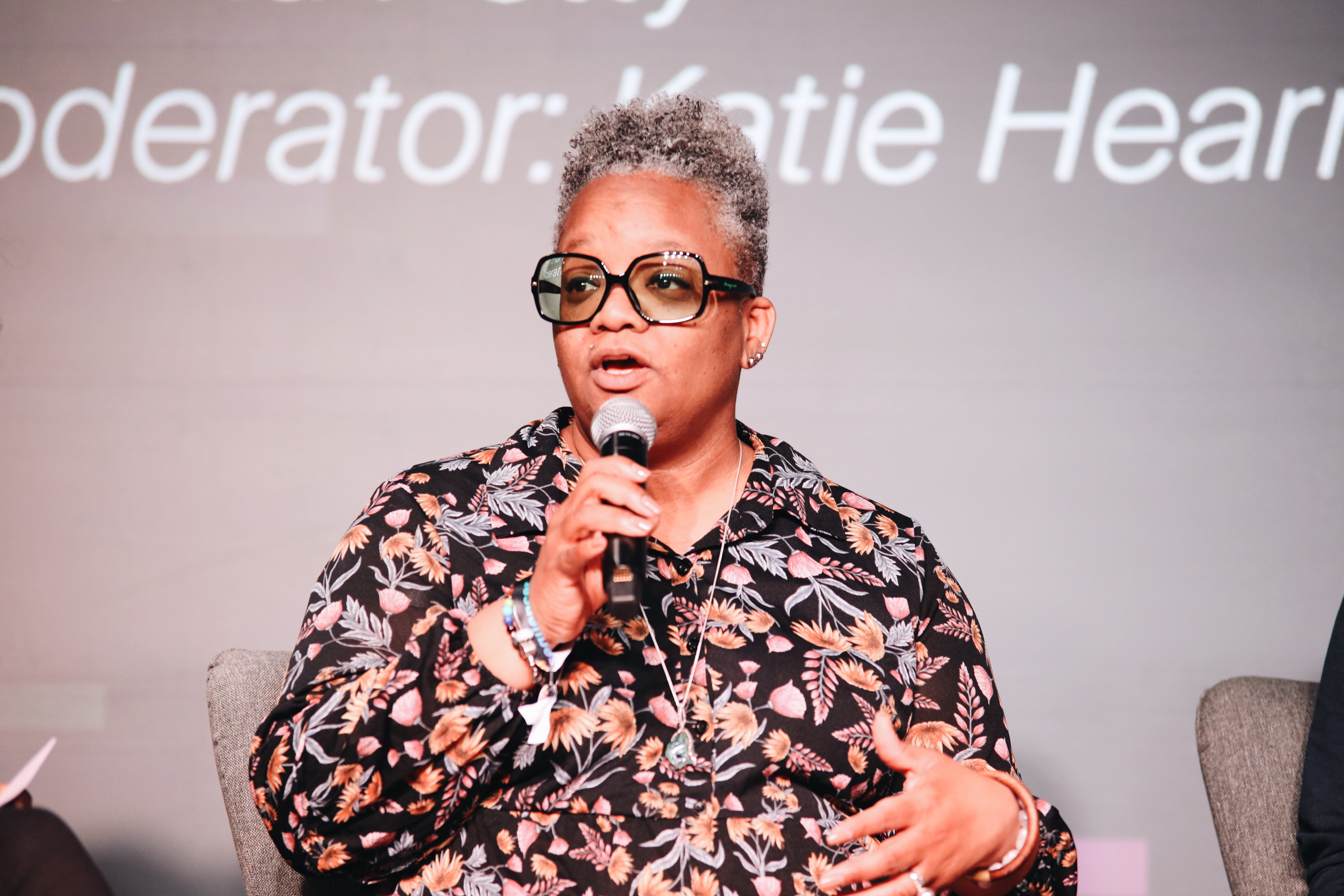
- Tawana Petty speaking at re:publica in 2019.
- Born: Detroit, MI
- Known for: Author, Poet, Social Justice Organizer, Youth Advocate
- Website: https://tawanapetty.org/

Tawana Petty is an American author, poet, social justice organizer, mother and youth advocate who works to counter systemic racism. Petty formerly served as Director of Policy and Advocacy for the Algorithmic Justice League representing AJL in national and international processes shaping AI governance.

She has also served as the National Organizing Director for Data for Black Lives, and as the Data Justice Director for the Detroit Community Technology Project. . Petty is a 2023-2025 Just Tech Fellow with the Social Science Research Council, an alumni practitioner fellow of the Stanford Center on Philanthropy and Civil Society (PACS), an alumni fellow of the Detroit Equity Action Lab, convening member of the Detroit Digital Justice Coalition, and founder and Executive Director of Petty Propolis, a Black women-led artist incubator focused on cultivating visionary resistance through poetry, literacy and literary workshops, anti-racism facilitation, and community-centered initiatives.

In light of police brutality against black individuals, Petty and other researchers like Deborah Raji and Ruha Benjamin are working towards putting an end to the use of surveillance technologies like facial recognition in policing. The failure of these technologies to correctly identify darker-skinned individuals raises the concern that these algorithms are biased against Black individuals.

Petty has highlighted reported cases of wrongful identification involving facial recognition systems and argues that these disparities are linked to broader structural issues, including biased training data and patterns of over-policing in Black communities.

Petty has been an outspoken organizer against the use of facial recognition technology in policing, particularly in Detroit. She has argued that such technologies carry disproportionate consequences for Black communities, noting, for instance, that Detroit accounts for a large share of documented police misidentification cases involving the technology in the United States. Petty has also argued that the harms of these systems cannot be reduced to technical error alone, contending that human cognitive bias, including anti-Blackness, shapes how algorithmic systems are designed and deployed against predominantly Black communities. Her organizing work in Detroit has focused on Project Green Light, a city surveillance program she has criticized as a harmful model being adopted by other cities.

Petty is dedicated to helping Detroit and is concerned with the number of cases involving police misidentification. In 2011 and 2012, she researched the history of COINTELPRO, and years later, began working with Our Data Bodies to investigate issues of data extraction on underprivileged demographics.

== Notable work ==
Petty has been involved in numerous efforts to center racial equity in data science:

- Alongside the Detroit Community Technology Project, Petty has been outspoken against Detroit's "Project Green Light," an attempt to use video footage gathered by private businesses to surveil Detroit residents using facial recognition. She was a member of the curatorial team for DEPTH, an exhibition at Science Gallery Detroit.
- As one of the contributors to Our Data Bodies, Petty has focused on working with community organizations across the US to push back against data collection efforts that harm minoritized people. The project "combines community-based organizing, capacity-building, and rigorous academic research." The group has published several interim reports. First, "From Paranoia to Power" in 2016, and then "Reclaiming our data" in 2018.
- Petty uses her poetry as a mode of resistance. She uses the name Honeycomb in conjunction with this work, and her first book of poetry was entitled Introducing... Honeycomb. Her second book of poetry, Coming Out My Box, focuses on her lived experience as a Black woman from Detroit. She has a one-woman show by the same name. In addition to her personal poetry work, Petty believes in helping young people find their poetic voice. One workshop she teaches is entitled “Poetry As Visionary Resistance." The organization she leads for this work is called Petty Propolis, which also offers anti-racism training, organizes a yearly arts festival, and has led to the book Petty Propolis Reader.
- Towards Humanity: Shifting the Culture of Anti-racism Organizing

== Awards ==
- 2011 Spirit of Detroit Award
- 2011 Women Creating Caring Communities Award
- 2012 The Woman of Substance Award
- 2015 Detroit Awesome Award
- 2016 University of Michigan Black Law Student Association's Justice Honoree Award
- In 2021, named one of 100 Brilliant Women in AI Ethics
- 2023 CAIDP Civil Society AI Policy Leader Award
