= Deborah Raji =

Nigerian-Canadian computer scientist (born 1995/1996)

Inioluwa Deborah Raji
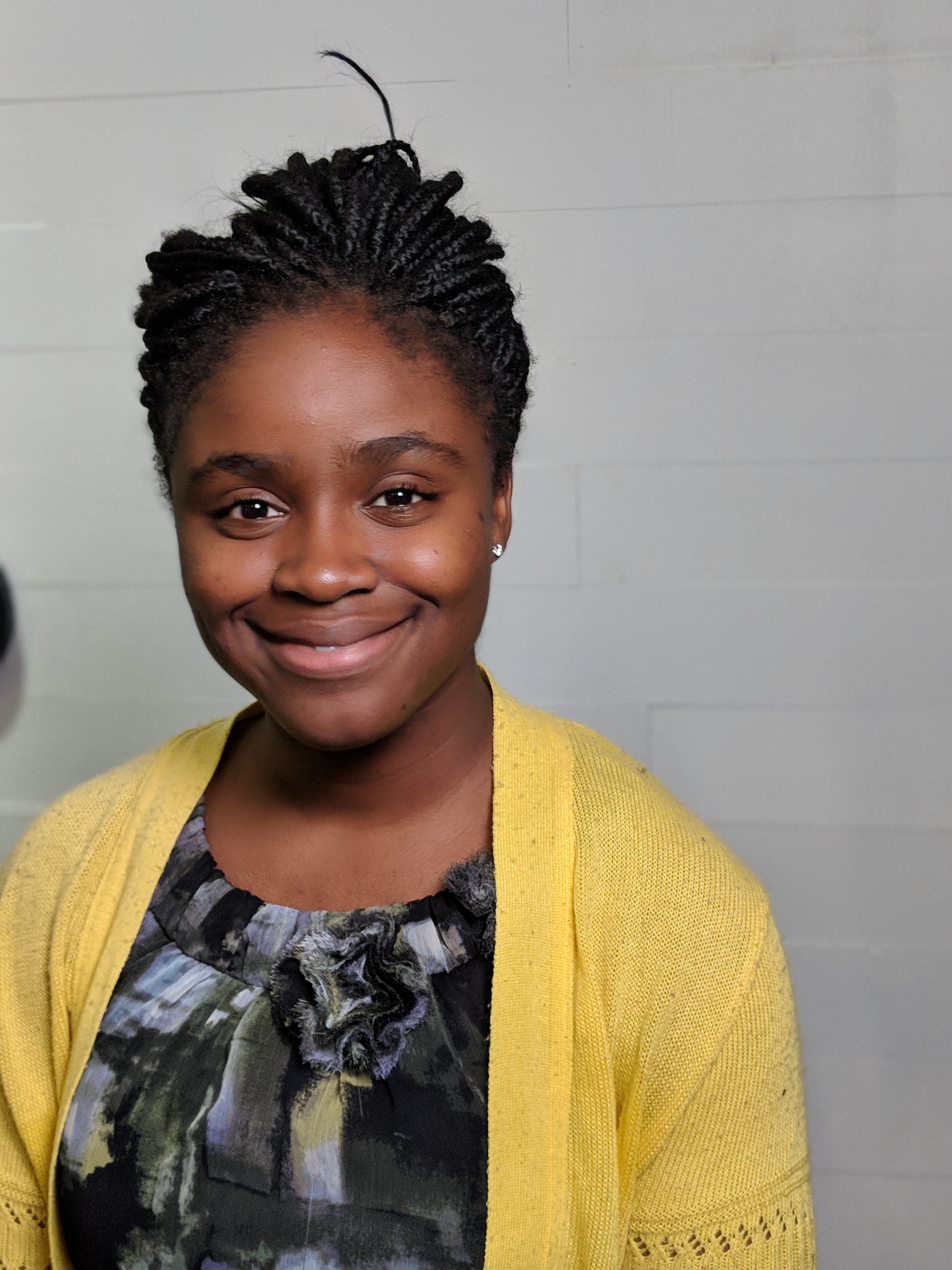
- Born: 1995/1996 (age 30–31); Port Harcourt, Nigeria
- Education: University of Toronto
- Known for: Algorithmic bias Fairness (machine learning); Algorithmic auditing and evaluation
- Scientific career
- Fields: Computer Science
- Workplaces: Mozilla Foundation; Partnership on AI; AI Now Institute; Google; MIT Media Lab

Inioluwa Deborah Raji (born 1995/1996) is a Nigerian-Canadian computer scientist and socio-tech leader who works on algorithmic bias, AI accountability, and algorithmic auditing. A current Mozilla fellow, she has been recognized by MIT Technology Review and Forbes as one of the world's top young innovators.

Raji started her work with racial bias in technology during her internship with Clarifai when she recognized that people of colour were more often tagged for NSFW compared to white people. Raji has previously worked with Joy Buolamwini, Timnit Gebru, and the Algorithmic Justice League on researching gender and racial bias in facial recognition technology. Her work on racial bias in facial recognition has forced companies to ultimately change their practices. She has also worked with Google’s Ethical AI team and been a research fellow at the Partnership on AI and AI Now Institute at New York University working on how to operationalize ethical considerations in machine learning engineering practice. She was working on a computer vision model that would help clients flag inappropriate images as NSFW.

== Early life and education ==
Raji was born in Port Harcourt, Nigeria, and moved to Mississauga, Ontario, Canada, when she was four years old. Eventually her family moved to Ottawa. She attended Colonel By Secondary School and completed the International Baccalaureate programme. She studied Engineering Science at the University of Toronto, graduating in 2019. In 2015, she founded Project Include, a nonprofit providing increased student access to engineering education, mentorship, and resources in low income and immigrant communities in the Greater Toronto Area. She started a Doctor of Philosophy - PhD, in Computer Science from the University of California, Berkeley in Aug 2021.

== Career and research ==
Raji worked with Joy Buolamwini at the MIT Media Lab and Algorithmic Justice League, where she audited commercial facial recognition technologies from Microsoft, Amazon, IBM, Face++, and Kairos. They found that these technologies were significantly less accurate for darker-skinned women than for white men. With support from other top AI researchers and increased public pressure and campaigning, their work led IBM and Amazon to agree to support facial recognition regulation and later halt the sale of their product to police for at least a year. Raji also interned at machine learning startup Clarifai, where she worked on a computer vision model for flagging images.

She participated in a research mentorship program at Google and worked with their Ethical AI team on creating model cards, a documentation framework for more transparent machine learning model reporting. She also co-led the development of internal auditing practices at Google. Her contributions at Google were separately presented and published at the AAAI conference and ACM Conference on Fairness, Accountability, and Transparency.

In 2019, Raji was a summer research fellow at The Partnership on AI working on setting industry machine learning transparency standards and benchmarking norms. Raji was a Tech Fellow at the AI Now Institute worked on algorithmic and AI auditing. Currently, she is a fellow at the Mozilla Foundation researching algorithmic auditing and evaluation.

Raji's work on bias in facial recognition systems has been highlighted in the 2020 documentary Coded Bias directed by Shalini Kantayya. She also took part in the 2026 documentary The AI Doc: Or How I Became an Apocaloptimist directed by Daniel Roher.

== Awards ==
- 2019 Venture Beat AI Innovations Award in category AI for Good (received with Joy Buolamwini and Timnit Gebru)
- 2020 MIT Technology Review 35 Under 35 Innovator Award
- 2020 EFF Pioneer Award (received with Buolamwini and Gebru)
- 2021 Forbes 30 Under 30 Award in Enterprise Technology
- 2021 100 Brilliant Women in AI Ethics Hall of Fame Honoree
- 2023 Time magazine 100 Most Influential People in AI
