= Coded Bias =

2020 American documentary film

- Film poster
- Directed by: Shalini Kantayya
- Produced by: Shalini Kantayya
- Production company: 7th Empire Media
- Release dates: January 2020 (Sundance); November 11, 2020
- Running time: 90 minutes
- Country: United States
- Language: English

Coded Bias is an American documentary film directed by Shalini Kantayya that premiered at the 2020 Sundance Film Festival. The film includes contributions from researchers Joy Buolamwini, Deborah Raji, Meredith Broussard, Cathy O’Neil, Zeynep Tufekci, Safiya Noble, Timnit Gebru, Virginia Eubanks, and Silkie Carlo, and others.

== Background ==
Kantayya previously directed a documentary titled Catching the Sun and also directed one episode of the National Geographic television series, Breakthrough. She is also an associate of UC Berkeley Graduate School of Journalism. Kantayya said an interview with 500 Global on August 17, 2021, that three years previously she did not even know what an algorithm was. She read the book Weapons of Math Destruction, which describes how artificial intelligence, machine learning, and algorithms can determine outcomes for certain people. She later came across the work of Joy Buolamwini through a Ted Talk.

== Summary ==
The documentary is about artificial intelligence and the biases that can be embedded into this technology. MIT media researcher Joy Buolamwini's computer science studies uncovered that her face was unrecognizable in many facial recognition systems and she worked to find out why these systems failed. She later found that facial recognition programs only worked when she wore a white mask. She goes on to find out about how else artificial technology can affect minorities.

Coded Bias says that there is a lack of legal structures for artificial intelligence, and that as a result, human rights are being violated. It says that some algorithms and artificial intelligence technologies discriminate by race and gender statuses in domains such as housing, career opportunities, healthcare, credit, education, and legalities. Buolamwini and her colleagues were later asked to testify in front of the US Congress about artificial intelligence. Buolamwini subsequently created a digital advocacy group, the Algorithmic Justice League.

The movie highlights how facial recognition systems can cause problems for vulnerable groups as due to bias within the code they do not recognize everyone equally or as equals. As companies use more machine learning, the algorithms discussed have substantial influence over the information we discern, determining individuals who successfully navigate automated hiring processes, those granted access to healthcare, and those subjected to heightened scrutiny within police systems.

== Release ==
The film first premiered at the 2020 Sundance Film Festival in January 2020. It had a limited release on November 11, 2020, before a full release in virtual cinemas across North America on November 18, 2020. The limited release garnered a box office revenue of $10,236. On April 5, 2021, the documentary was made available to stream on Netflix.

== Reception ==
=== Critical response ===
On the review aggregation website Rotten Tomatoes, the film holds an approval rating of 100% based on 52 reviews with an average rating of 7.9/10. The website's critical consensus reads, "Clear, concise, and comprehensive, Coded Bias offers a chilling look at largely unseen side effects of modern society's algorithmic underpinnings." On Metacritic, the film has a weighted average score of 73 out of 100 based on seven critic reviews.

In a review written for the New York Times, Devika Girish states "The film moves deftly between pragmatic and larger political critiques, arguing that it’s not just that the tech is faulty; even if it were perfect, it would infringe dangerously on people’s liberties."

Praising the documentary for its "impressive pacing," Nick Allen, writing for RogerEbert.com states "One might expect a documentary about data and algorithms to run a bit dry, but “Coded Bias” defies that by having a lot on its mind and by being quick on its feet, hopping all over the country, and the world."

In the review from the website of the Society for Social Studies of Science, Renee Shelby questioned whether readers understood the power she said was abused through this data collection. She states "Where there is power, there is resistance to power; and the film touches on politics “from above” and “from below.” The film showcases women's activism and social movements (e.g., the Hong Kong Umbrella Movement) fighting to ensure that surveillance and other algorithmic tools are not abused.".

Giving the documentary a 2.5 out of 5 stars, Ashley Sosa, writing for videolibrarian.com, states "The documentary's cautionary message about the dangers of algorithmic bias is presented in an engaging and humanistic way. Technical details are kept to a minimum, which could be viewed as positive or negative depending on prior knowledge and interest."

=== Accolades ===
Award	Year	Category	Result	Ref(s).
Asian American International Film Festival	2020	Emerging Director Award	Nominated	
Calgary International Film Festival	2020	Best International Documentary	Won	
Cinema Eye Honors Awards	2021	Outstanding Achievement in Graphic Design or Animation	Nominated	
Critics' Choice Documentary Awards	2020	Best Science/Nature Documentary	Nominated	
Hamptons International Film Festival	2020	New York Women in Film & Television Award	Won	
International Film Festival and Forum on Human Rights	2021	Grand Reportage World Organization Against Torture (OMCT) Award	Won	
NAACP Image Awards	2021	Outstanding Documentary (Film)	Nominated	
News and Documentary Emmy Awards	2021	Outstanding Science and Technology Documentary	Nominated	
Social Impact Media Awards	2021	Best Director	Won	
Social Impact Media Awards	2021	Grand Jury Prize for Transparency	Won	
Social Impact Media Awards	2021	Best Sound Design	Won	
Sundance Film Festival	2020	US Documentary Grand Jury Prize	Nominated	
Woodstock Film Festival	2020	Best Documentary Feature	Honorable Mention	

== See also ==
- Algorithmic Justice League
- Black in AI
- Data for Black Lives
- Joy Buolamwini
- Timnit Gebru
- Facial recognition
