= Arjen Kamphuis =

Missing Dutch person

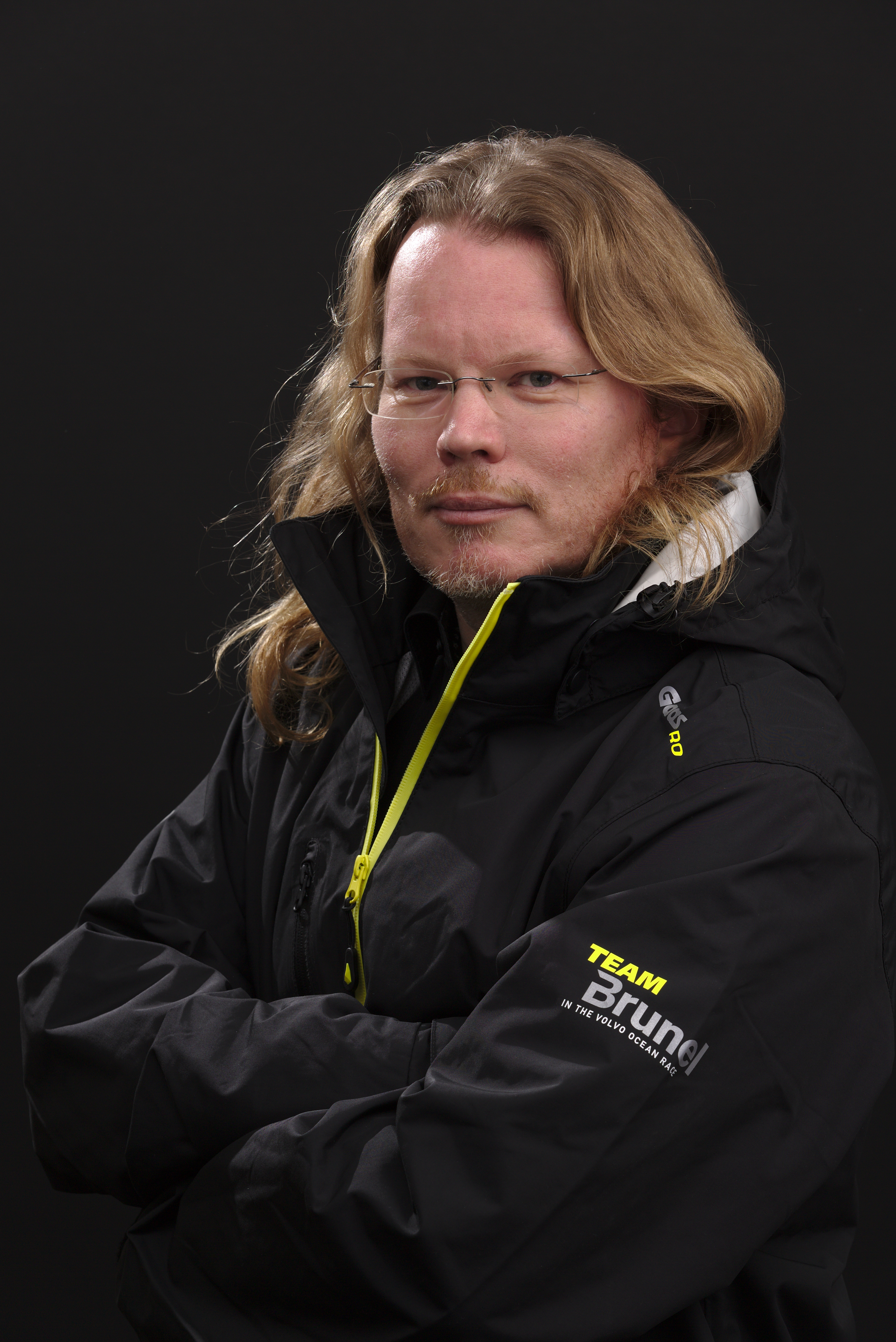
- Kamphuis in 2015
- Born: 26 January 1972; Groningen, Netherlands
- Disappeared: 20 August 2018 (aged 46); Bodø, Norway
- Status: Missing for 8 years, 3 months and 2 days

Arjen Kamphuis (26 January 1972 – disappeared 20 August 2018) was a cybersecurity expert and hacktivist. He addressed topics like open standards and free software, safe elections and an IT-aware and IT-capable government, eventually to protect free speech and democracy. Ever since Edward Snowden leaked highly classified information from the National Security Agency (NSA) in 2013, he was especially dedicated to protecting investigative journalists. He wrote the book Information Security for Journalists with co-author Silkie Carlo, director of Big Brother Watch.

== Career ==
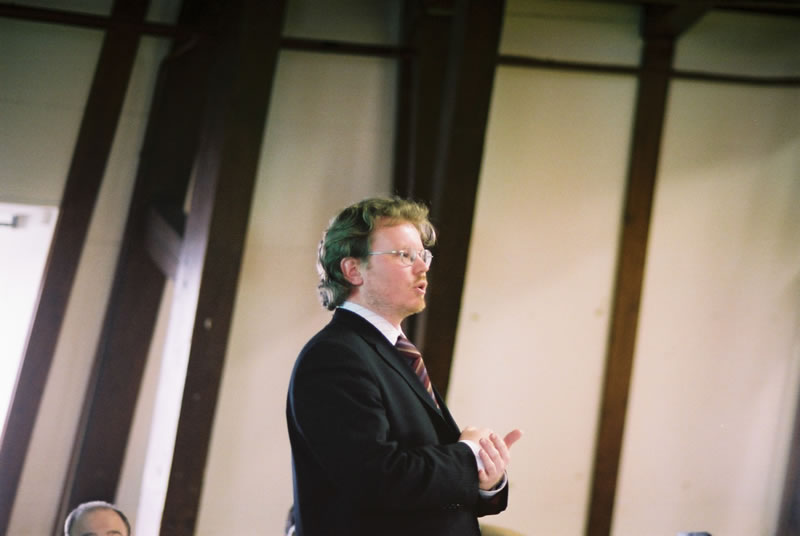
Kamphuis speaking in 2005

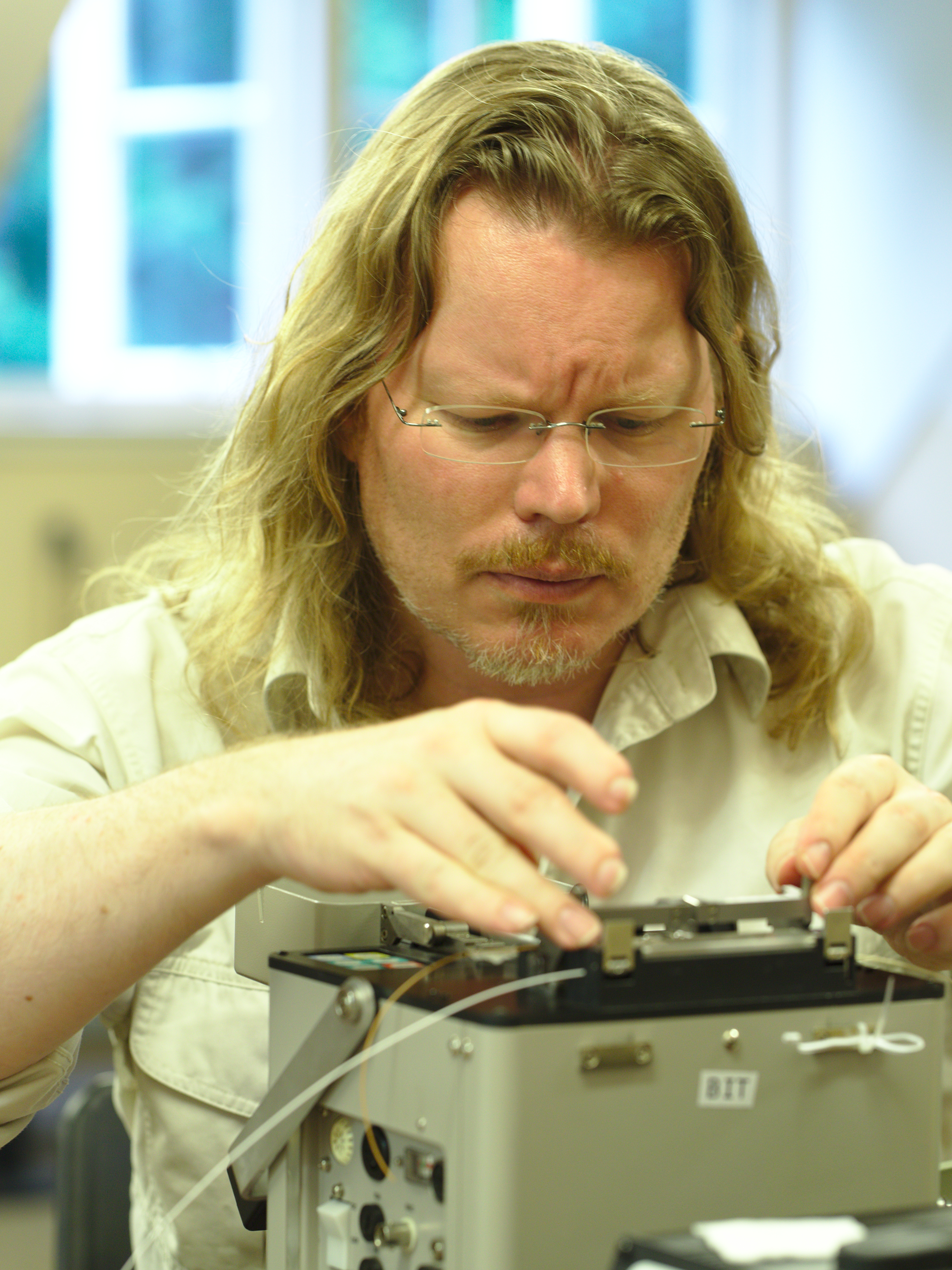
Kamphuis attending a workshop in 2015

Kamphuis was co-founder and Chief Technology Officer of Gendo. Kamphuis studied Natural Sciences at Utrecht University and worked for IBM and TwynstraGudde as IT architect, trainer and IT strategy advisor. He was a certified EDP auditor and information security specialist. Since 2006, he helped to secure the information systems of corporates, national government and NGOs. His work ranges from regular privacy compliance and security awareness up to countering espionage against companies, journalists and governments. To keep up technically he was involved with the global hacker scene. He kept in touch with (former) employees of spy agencies and other professionals who work at the front of critical infrastructure protection. He worked on the strategic impact of new technological developments and the social, economic and geopolitical impact of science and technology.

In 2016, Kamphuis started working for Brunel International in Amsterdam as Lead Advisor Information Security and from then on he worked closely with American NSA whistleblowers Bill Binney and J. Kirk Wiebe. On 11 August 2017, Kamphuis and Binney were invited to a press conference in Austria, together with Max Schrems and Thomas Lohninger, to talk about mass surveillance in Austria. In late 2017, he started the Brunel daughter company Pretty Good Knowledge as Technical Director. Binney and Wiebe were co-founders, and they contribute as Directors of Analytics.

Kamphuis has been involved in formulating public IT policy in the areas of open standards and open source for the government and public sector. He advised senior managers and administrators of companies and public institutions, members of parliament in several European countries and the Dutch cabinet about the opportunities offered by open standards and open source software for the European knowledge economy and society as a whole. In the expert team of Interior Minister Ronald Plasterk he advised about (not) using e-voting for elections.

== Personal life ==
Kamphuis was in a relationship with Annie Machon, former MI5 intelligence officer and whistleblower, between 2007 and 2014, living in Düsseldorf and Berlin. In 2016 he settled in Amsterdam. He was a much sought-after international speaker on technology policy issues. He wrote about his insights and ideas for Huffington Post.

== Disappearance ==
In the summer of 2018, Kamphuis, an experienced hiker, went on holiday to Norway. On 20 August, he checked out of his hotel in Bodø, in the province of Nordland in Northern Norway. He was due to return to Amsterdam two days later, but did not board his flight. His family and friends raised the alarm when Kamphuis failed to show up for work and missed scheduled appointments.

=== Police investigation ===
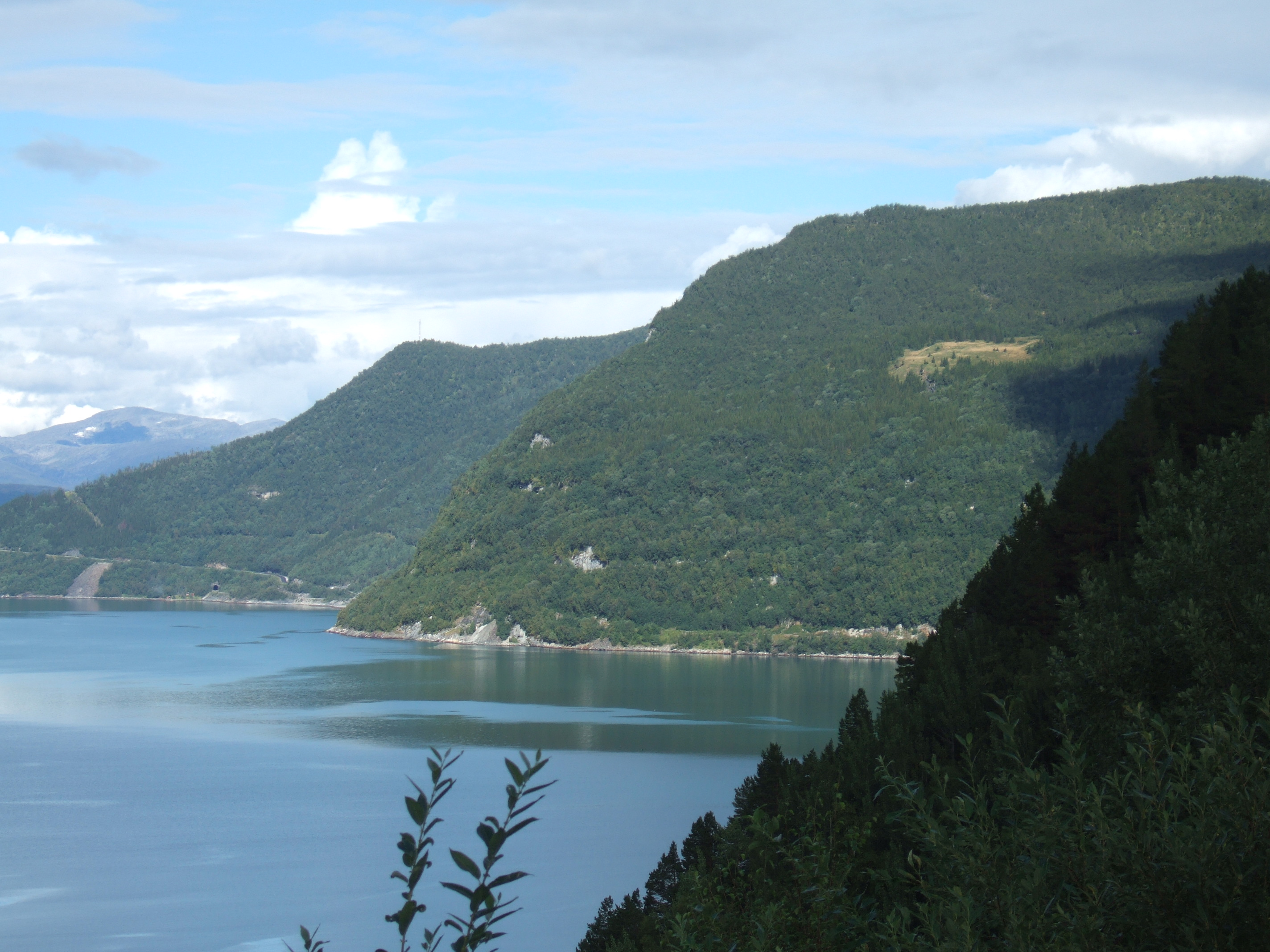
Kvernfloget rock face, where Kamphuis' kayak and other belongings were found

Kvernfloget and Saltdal Fjord, as seen from the air

Although the Norwegian police kept all options open, there were three distinct scenarios that could explain Kamphuis' disappearance: an accident, foul play, or a voluntary disappearance. However, conclusive evidence for any of these scenarios is lacking. Conspiracy theories quickly emerged due to his close ties with whistleblowers, such as WikiLeaks founder Julian Assange. Kamphuis had initially planned to travel to Svalbard, but went to Bodø instead—without prior notice. His close friend Ancilla van de Leest suggested on the television show Pauw that the matter might be linked to his work. She noted that a "fairly important NATO security center" is located in Bodø and that Kamphuis "was certainly aware of that". She also stated that she did not suspect he intended to disappear voluntarily.

On 13 September 2018, more than three weeks after he went missing, the police announced that Kamphuis' kayak had been found two days earlier. It was discovered near the rock face of Kvernfloget on Saltdal Fjord, in the same area where other belongings, including his identification documents, had previously been found. Additionally, a new witness reported seeing Kamphuis on 30 August in the town of Vikeså in Western Norway, where he was reportedly in the company of two men. That was the same day Kamphuis' phone was switched on for twenty minutes in that town, after which the SIM card was replaced with a German one. This led to the assumption that Kamphuis was likely still alive ten days after his disappearance. Earlier, other eyewitnesses had reported seeing him on 3 September in Ribe, Denmark.

In early November 2018, less than three months after his disappearance, the Norwegian police announced that the investigation into Kamphuis had stalled. Although Van de Leest had previously stated she doubted he had disappeared voluntarily, she announced on behalf of the family in late 2018 that "the possibility that Kamphuis might have entered a 'state of mental distress' was being considered". This was attributed to his "stressful life, combined with high intelligence and weeks of isolation". J. Kirk Wiebe also reported indications that Kamphuis had "wanted to disappear off the radar".

The police investigation was closed exactly one year after the disappearance. They concluded that Kamphuis had likely met with a fatal accident while kayaking, although his body was never found. It turned out that Kamphuis' phone and laptop had been taken by two Eastern European truck drivers; this explains why the phone connected to a cell tower as late as 30 August. After questioning the drivers, the police had no reason to suspect they were involved in the disappearance.

=== Later investigations ===
Friends of Kamphuis were unwilling to accept the conclusion that he had simply died in an accident. Consequently, between August 2021 and June 2022, investigative journalist Sanne Terlingen and Helma de Boer conducted a supplementary investigation in consultation with the family and the Norwegian police. In addition, following the release of the docudrama series, the group of friends launched a crowdfunding campaign in late June 2022 to finance a new investigation and help determine the possible cause of death. They felt there were too many indications that something about the case did not add up. For instance, no one knew Kamphuis was a kayaker, and he had not informed his friends of his altered travel plans. Even after changing his plans, Kamphuis had stuck to his original story: that he was going to Svalbard. They also considered it plausible that he was being watched. The crowdfunding campaign enabled forensic pathologist and private investigator Frank van der Goot to conduct an extensive investigation in Norway. He reached the same conclusion as the Norwegian police. On 1 December 2022, it was announced that Kamphuis had most likely drowned. It is therefore assumed that Kamphuis was neither abducted nor killed by the CIA, as had been theorized. Van der Goot further stated that he did not believe the body would ever be found.

In late January 2023, Algemeen Dagblad published a nine-minute episode of the series Achter de voorpagina (English: Behind the Front Page) on its website. The episode featured journalist and foreign affairs editor Annemieke van Dongen, who had also investigated Kamphuis' disappearance in Norway. Given the abundance of strange coincidences, Van Dongen did not consider it plausible that Kamphuis had died in an accident.

== Legacy ==
In memory of Kamphuis, friends compiled a selection of his articles, lectures, and blog posts, and published them on 24 January 2020 as the book Infosecurity (Gran Knows Why). Mathematician Bart Jacobs wrote the foreword, Arjen Kamphuis and the public cause in the digital world. On the day of its release, the exhibition Into Nothingness – The Disappearance of Arjen Kamphuis also opened at the hackerspace Hack42 in Arnhem, featuring work by artist Jillis Groen.

In August 2020, Luitingh-Sijthoff published the thriller Van de radar (English: Off the Radar) by Frank van Zwol. This non-fiction novel is based on the disappearance of Kamphuis and blends factual events with fictional characters to present a possible scenario.

The four-part docudrama series Ze weten alles van je (English: They Know Everything About You), directed by filmmaker Hanro Smitsman, premiered on Videoland on 29 June 2022. In this fact-based miniseries, journalist Nadia (portrayed by Charlie Chan Dagelet) decides to delve into the case. In addition to Kamphuis' friends, who were approached by the creators rather than initiating the project themselves, actors Jim Deddes and Monic Hendrickx also feature in the series.

== Bibliography ==
- Information Security for Journalists: Protecting Your Story, Your Source and Yourself Online (with Silkie Carlo). 2016.
- Infosecurity (Gran Knows Why): A Collection of Articles, Posts and Lectures, and a Handy Infosec Guide. 2020. ISBN 9789090328218

== See also ==
- List of people who disappeared mysteriously (2000–present)
