= Hacking the Spaces =

2009 essay about hackerspaces

Hacking the Spaces is a 2009 essay by Austrian artist and cultural theorist Johannes Grenzfurthner and German writer Frank Apunkt Schneider, published by the art collective monochrom. It traces the origins of hackerspaces and hacklabs to countercultural movements and criticizes what the authors regard as a shift toward commercial and entrepreneurial forms of maker culture. The essay also addresses social exclusion within hacker communities and argues for a renewed political orientation of hackerspaces.

== Background and publication ==
Hacking the Spaces appeared on monochrom's website in May 2009, with the subtitle "A critical acclaim of what was, is and could be a hackerspace (or hacklab, for that matter)". On 10 May, Cory Doctorow published extracts from the essay on Boing Boing under the heading "Hackerspaces and hippie crashpads".

The essay was reprinted in 2012 in Critical Making, a collection edited by Garnet Hertz examining the relationship between technological practice, art and critical reflection.

== Argument ==
Grenzfurthner and Schneider trace the historical and political background of hackerspaces to the countercultural movements of the 1960s and 1970s. In their account, the failure of large-scale revolutionary ambitions encouraged smaller experiments in self-organized living and working. The authors connect this development to the Italian Autonomia movement, squats, independent cafés, cooperatives, communes and pirate radio. Such initiatives sought to establish alternative social environments within existing political and economic structures.

The essay describes these environments as "third spaces", challenging the conventional separation of work, domestic life and leisure. Hackerspaces, in this interpretation, offered opportunities for collective experimentation and cooperation beyond established institutional arrangements. The authors argue, however, that the political character of such spaces became less distinct as countercultural practices were gradually absorbed into mainstream society and commercial production.

A central argument concerns the appropriation of countercultural ideas by capitalism. Grenzfurthner and Schneider describe how practices originally developed in opposition to dominant social structures could be adapted for commercial innovation and economic development. They associate the depoliticization of hackerspaces with a growing emphasis on technological hobbies, individual projects and professional opportunities. The authors compare this development to the transformation of squatted buildings into conventional housing and the incorporation of alternative culture into commercial industries. They also acknowledge that not all hackerspaces followed the same trajectory.

The essay further criticizes the social composition and informal hierarchies of hackerspaces. Grenzfurthner and Schneider use the phrase "white male nerd dominance" to describe communities in which technical expertise, established social networks and prevailing cultural attitudes may discourage participation by women, ethnic minorities and other marginalized groups. They question the limited representation of Black and Latino participants in American hackerspaces, as well as women and people with migrant backgrounds in European hacker communities.

To address these problems, the authors advocate a renewed engagement with political history and theory. They propose workshops examining the historical roots of hackerspaces and the philosophical and political ideas associated with them. Rather than treating technical experimentation as politically neutral, they call for a clearer understanding of its social implications and for the inclusion of groups excluded from existing hacker communities.

== Reception ==
Hacking the Spaces has been cited in academic discussions of the history and political orientation of hackerspaces. Peter Troxler referenced the essay in Open Design Now (2011), while Maxigas cited it in his study of the differing historical traditions of hacklabs and hackerspaces. The latter distinguishes politically oriented hacklabs from hackerspaces with roots in computer clubs and technical communities.

Sasha Costanza-Chock discusses the essay at length in Design Justice (2020). Costanza-Chock examines the essay's account of politicized hacklabs giving way to more entrepreneurial spaces, but criticizes its historical account for paying insufficient attention to Black and feminist movements and hacking traditions outside Europe and the United States. The book also discusses the authors' proposals for political education, greater inclusion and changes to informal leadership structures. Earlier, Sophie Toupin had included the essay among accounts of hackerspace culture that, in her assessment, largely overlooked feminist and postcolonial perspectives.

The essay's criticism of exclusionary hacker culture has also been cited in research on maker education and feminist hackerspaces. Erica Rosenfeld Halverson and Kimberly M. Sheridan quote its description of "white male nerd dominance" in their 2014 article "The Maker Movement in Education". Anne Goldenberg also quotes the passage in "Hacking with Care", an essay on care, solidarity and exclusion in hacktivist communities. In a 2015 ethnographic study, Sarah Fox, Rachel Rose Ulgado and Daniela K. Rosner document how a founder of the Seattle Attic Community Workshop drew on the essay's call for "non-repressive inclusion" when developing a feminist hackerspace intended to welcome people beyond established hacker and maker communities.

At the 2012 Hackers on Planet Earth conference, Grenzfurthner and Sean Bonner organized a panel titled Hacking the Spaces on women's participation in hackspaces. The panel was covered in The Guardian and later discussed in Christina Dunbar-Hester's Hacking Diversity (2020).

== See also ==
- Fab lab
- Hacktivism
