= Campbell Brown =

Campbell Brown may refer to:

- Campbell Brown (footballer) (born 1983), Australian rules footballer
- Campbell Brown (golfer) (1876–1951), American golfer
- Campbell Brown (journalist) (born 1968), American journalist

== See also ==
- Michael Campbell-Brown (born 1966), Scottish businessman and fugitive
