= Catching the Sun =

Catching the Sun may refer to:

- Catching the Sun (film), a 2015 documentary film on solar power
- Catching the Sun (album), a 1980 jazz album by jazz group Spyro Gyra
