= Cordova High School (Tennessee) =

Location
- 1800 Berryhill Road; Cordova, Tennessee 38016; United States; 35.17437°N 89.75424°W

Information
- Type: High School
- Established: 1997
- School district: Memphis-Shelby County Schools
- Principal: Barton Thorne
- Teaching staff: 120.77 (FTE)
- Enrollment: 2,194 (2023-2024)
- Student to teacher ratio: 18.17
- Colors: Green and Black
- Team name: Wolves
- Website: https://cordova-hs.scsk12.org/

Cordova High School is a public high school (grades 9-12) located in Cordova, Tennessee, United States, within unincorporated Shelby County, to the east of the city of Memphis, and is also part of the Memphis-Shelby County Schools district.

It is previously a Memphis City School district campus. Before the merger of MCS, Cordova High School served portions of Memphis as well as some portions of unincorporated Shelby County, which are also zoned to elementary and middle schools in the then-SCS district.

In 2007, Cordova High School had an expected enrollment of 2,400.

== History ==
Cordova High School was constructed in 1996 and completed in 1997 as a joint venture between two districts known for Memphis City Schools and Shelby County Schools, as the school's operating systems. The school opened during the 1997-1998 school year to a class of freshmen as a school operated by the Shelby County Schools. The freshmen of the 1997-98 school year voted the school's colors to be green and black, and the school's mascot to be the wolf. Every following year the school added a new class until 2001, when the first graduating class left Cordova High School.

The 2003-04 school year ended with Cordova High School leaving the Shelby County Schools district and joining the Memphis City Schools district. Cordova adopted a school uniform policy in Fall 2004, since the entire Memphis City Schools district adopted a uniform policy. All schools were required to adopt one at the time. A student petition created at the end of the 2014-2015 school year caught Principal Chandler's attention, bringing an end to the uniform policy after a vote by the parents.The uniform policy was replaced by a dress code.

== Courses and programs ==
Advanced Placement classes are available, preparing students for college. The school also offers vocational education classes, such as cosmetology, automotive, and technology based courses.

== Feeder patterns ==
Memphis City Schools elementary and middle schools in the area that feeds students into Cordova High School are:

- Cordova Elementary School
- Kate Bond Elementary School
- Cordova Middle School
- Kate Bond Middle School

The following Shelby County elementary schools also feed into Cordova:

- Chimneyrock Elementary School
- Dexter Elementary School (partial)
- Macon-Hall Elementary School (partial)

The following Shelby County middle schools also feed into Cordova:

- Dexter Middle School (partial)
- Mt. Pisgah Middle School (partial)

== Athletics ==
Cordova athletic programs include football, soccer, cheer, wrestling, basketball, bowling, tennis and clay shooting. They have won team championships in boys' track in 2004 and 2009.

== Notable alumni ==
- Raumesh Akbari, Tennessee State Senator, 29th District
- Jeremy Banks, NFL player
- Quinton Bohanna, NFL player
- Joy Buolamwini of the MIT Media Lab, founder of the Algorithmic Justice League
- NLE Choppa, American rapper
- Michael Coe, former NFL player
- Phillip Merling, former NFL player
- Chris Taylor, former NFL player
- Cities Aviv, American rapper
