= VozMob =

Los Angeles online immigrant initiative

VozMob or Mobile Voices/Voces Móviles (est. 2010) is an open-source "mobile media project that supports immigrant and low wage workers in the Los Angeles area in the documentation of their own stories and communities." It is "specifically aimed at those on the dark side of the digital divide." It enables people with cellphone access to send content to an internet site, and to communicate to a larger audience.

It began as a participatory design project of the Institute of Popular Education of Southern California and the University of Southern California. Other affiliates include the Los Angeles Community Action Network.

Story contributors record video, photos and audio content, and then "send their dispatches by phone to an email address, which directly uploads the messages to Vozmob's blog." The "VozMob content management system is a customized version of Drupal."

== See also ==
- Media in Los Angeles
- Mobile reporting
- Digital storytelling
- L.A. in a Minute
