= Allison Koenecke =

American computer scientist and academic

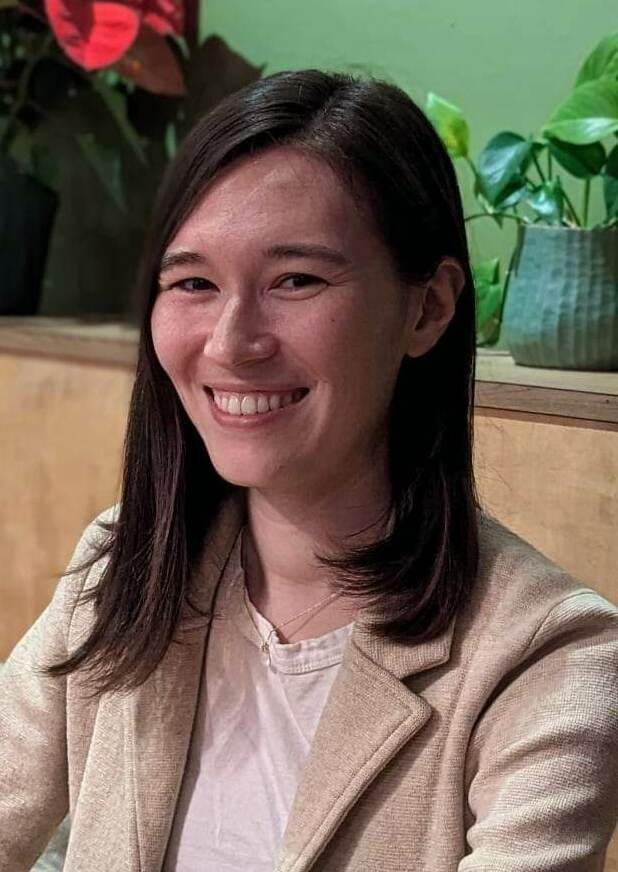
- Education: Massachusetts Institute of Technology; Stanford University
- Scientific career
- Workplaces: Microsoft Research; Cornell University
- Thesis: Fairness in algorithmic services (2021)
- Doctoral advisor: Susan Athey

Allison Koenecke is an American computer scientist and an assistant professor in the Department of Information Science at Cornell Tech, a graduate campus and research center of Cornell University. Her research considers computational social science and algorithmic fairness. In 2022, Koenecke was named one of the Forbes 30 Under 30 in Science.

== Early life and education ==
Koenecke graduated from Thomas Jefferson High School for Science and Technology. As a high school student, Koenecke took part in a mathematics competitions. She was in the first cohort of participants for the Math Prize for Girls, and has continued to support the program as her career has progressed. As an undergraduate student at Massachusetts Institute of Technology, she majored in mathematics with a minor in economics. She worked in economic consultancy for several years before realizing she wanted to do research that benefitted society.

Koenecke was a doctoral researcher in the Institute for Computational and Mathematical Engineering at Stanford University. Koenecke was advised by notable economist Susan Athey and Sharad Goel, and her doctoral research focused on fairness in algorithmic systems. Prior to Cornell, Koenecke was a postdoctoral researcher at Microsoft Research, New England, where she focused on machine learning and statistics. Her current research interest also includes causal inference in public health.

== Research and career ==
Koenecke moved to Cornell University as an assistant professor in 2022. She studies algorithmic fairness, including racial disparities in voice recognition systems. She noticed that voice recognition was being increasingly used in society, and was aware of the work of Joy Buolamwini and Timnit Gebru on facial recognition. Koenecke started to perform tests on the voice recognition software developed by Amazon, IBM, Google, Microsoft and Apple. She showed these voice recognition systems had considerable racial disparities, and were more likely to misinterpret Black speakers. Whilst she could not precisely define the reasons for these racial disparities, she proposed that it was due to acoustic differences (differences in the patterns of stress/intonation) between white and African American vernacular. She argued that this kind of study was critical to improving such systems, emphasizing that equity must be part of the design of future technologies.

Koenecke was named one of the Forbes 30 Under 30 in Science in 2022.

== Awards and honors ==
- 2020 Berkeley EECS Rising Stars
- 2022 Forbes 30 Under 30
- 2025 Sloan Research Fellowship

== Selected publications ==
- Allison Koenecke; Andrew Nam; Emily Lake; et al. (23 March 2020). "Racial disparities in automated speech recognition". Proceedings of the National Academy of Sciences of the United States of America. 117 (14): 7684–7689. Bibcode:2020PNAS..117.7684K. doi:10.1073/PNAS.1915768117. ISSN 0027-8424. PMC 7149386. PMID 32205437.
- Maximilian F Konig; Michael A Powell; Verena Staedtke; et al. (30 April 2020). "Preventing cytokine storm syndrome in COVID-19 using α-1 adrenergic receptor antagonists". Journal of Clinical Investigation. doi:10.1172/JCI139642. ISSN 0021-9738. PMC 7324164. PMID 32352407.
- Michael Powell; Allison Koenecke; James Brian Byrd; et al. (28 July 2021). "Ten Rules for Conducting Retrospective Pharmacoepidemiological Analyses: Example COVID-19 Study". Frontiers in Pharmacology. 12 700776. doi:10.3389/FPHAR.2021.700776. ISSN 1663-9812. PMC 8357144. PMID 34393782.
- Allison Koenecke; Anna Seo Gyeong Choi; Katelyn X. Mei; Hilke Schellmann; Mona Sloane (5 June 2024). "Careless Whisper: Speech-to-Text Hallucination Harms". FAccT '24: Proceedings of the 2024 ACM Conference on Fairness, Accountability, and Transparency. New York: Association for Computing Machinery. pp. 1672–1681. arXiv:2402.08021. doi:10.1145/3630106.3658996. ISBN 979-8-4007-0450-5.
