= Yeshimabeit Milner =

American technologist and African American activist

- Born: United States
- Education: Brown University
- Occupations: Technologist, activist
- Awards: Roddenberry Foundation Fellowship (2018)

Yeshimabeit "Yeshi" Milner is an American technologist and activist. She is the executive director and co-founder of Data for Black Lives.

== Early life and education ==
Yeshimabeit Milner grew up in Miami, Florida. Starting in her late teens, Milner became involved in activism and data science. She worked with the Power U Center for Social Change as a high school senior. Milner attended Brown University, graduating in 2012 with a BA degree in Africana Studies.

== Career ==
In 2013 at age 22, after returning to Miami after college, Milner started working with the Power U Center for Social Change and looking at Black infant mortality rates locally in trying to understand why they were disproportionately so high. They were able to retrieve data from 300 mothers, and as a result changed local policy.

One of her classmates at Brown University was mathematician Lucas Mason-Brown, together they founded Data for Black Lives in November 2017. The Data for Black Lives (D4BL) annual conference was started in 2018 by Yeshimabeit Milner and Lucas Mason- Brown. They use the slogan, "Abolish Big Data!" with hopes to redesign big data and to "put data into the hands of those who need it most". In 2020, the group was able to compile state-level data about the impact of COVID-19 on Black people and are working on compiling a nationwide database of technologies used by police departments. In 2021, Milner co-wrote a research piece for Demos on algorithmic racism from Big Tech companies.

== Awards and accolades ==
Milner served on the board of the Highlander Research and Education Center in Tennessee. In 2018, she was awarded a Roddenberry Foundation Fellowship, which honors and invests in extraordinary people who can change the world. In 2020, Data for Black Lives and its founders were awarded the Forbes 30 Under 30 and the New York Times 2020 Good Tech Awards.

== See also ==
- African-American women in computer science
