= Catching the Sun (film) =

- Directed by: Shalini Kantayya
- Produced by: Shalini Kantayya; Aarti Tandon; Cedric Troadec
- Edited by: Michael Culyba; Shalini Kantayya; Tyler H. Walk
- Music by: David Majzlin
- Production company: 7th Empire Media
- Distributed by: New Day Films
- Release dates: June 12, 2015 (Los Angeles Film Festival); April 22, 2016
- Running time: 73 minutes
- Countries: United States, China, Germany, India
- Language: English

Catching the Sun is a 2015 documentary film on the growth of the solar power industry that premiered on Netflix in April, 2016. Directed by Shalini Kantayya, the film features portraits of diverse personalities and their roles in the transition to solar power. Unemployed workers in Richmond, California, businessmen in China, Tea Party activists, and a would-be White House adviser are all featured in the film. The film debunks a false dilemma that clean energy requires sacrificing economic prosperity.

== Synopsis ==
The film begins with the 2012 Chevron refinery fire in Richmond, California and contrasts the possibilities for Richmond of an energy sector based on solar installation versus continued pollution and economic stagnation from an energy industry rooted on the oil refinery. The film gives a short history of solar technology in the United States, and the road not taken when, on his first day in office, Ronald Reagan removed the solar panels Jimmy Carter had placed on the White House, and abandoned policies to further solar development.

The film features unemployed workers in Northern California receiving Green-collar job training from Solar Richmond to work in the emergent field of solar installation. Van Jones features prominently in the documentary, which depicts his early work in Green for All, his family's relocation from Oakland to Washington, DC to take advantage of a White House job offer, and Jones's subsequent resignation in the face of sustained attacks from conservative media.

Conservative Debbie Dooley from Atlanta, Georgia rejects an ideological divide between the left and right on clean energy. Through her organization, Conservatives for Energy Freedom, she advocates for clean energy by breaking down barriers that favor the incumbent energy industry and restrict a true free market.

While ideological gridlock weighs on American energy policy, other countries move forward. A profile on Zhongwei Jiang, a Chinese entrepreneur based in Wuxi, China gives perspective on solar growth in Germany, India, and China. Jiang, who grew up without electricity until the age of eight, founded the solar company WesTech in 2003. Jiang conducts an international business in solar products and dreams of a "Solar City" in Texas.

== Director ==
The film is the documentary debut for Indian-born and Brooklyn-based, eco-activist and filmmaker Shalini Kantayya. Kantayya had a career breakthrough when she became a finalist in the 2007 reality TV show On the Lot.

== Release ==
The film debuted at the 2015 LA Film Festival and had a limited theatrical release in the United States in Spring 2016. Catching the Sun made its public debut on Earth Day 2016 on Netflix.
