= Joy Buolamwini =

Computer scientist and digital activist

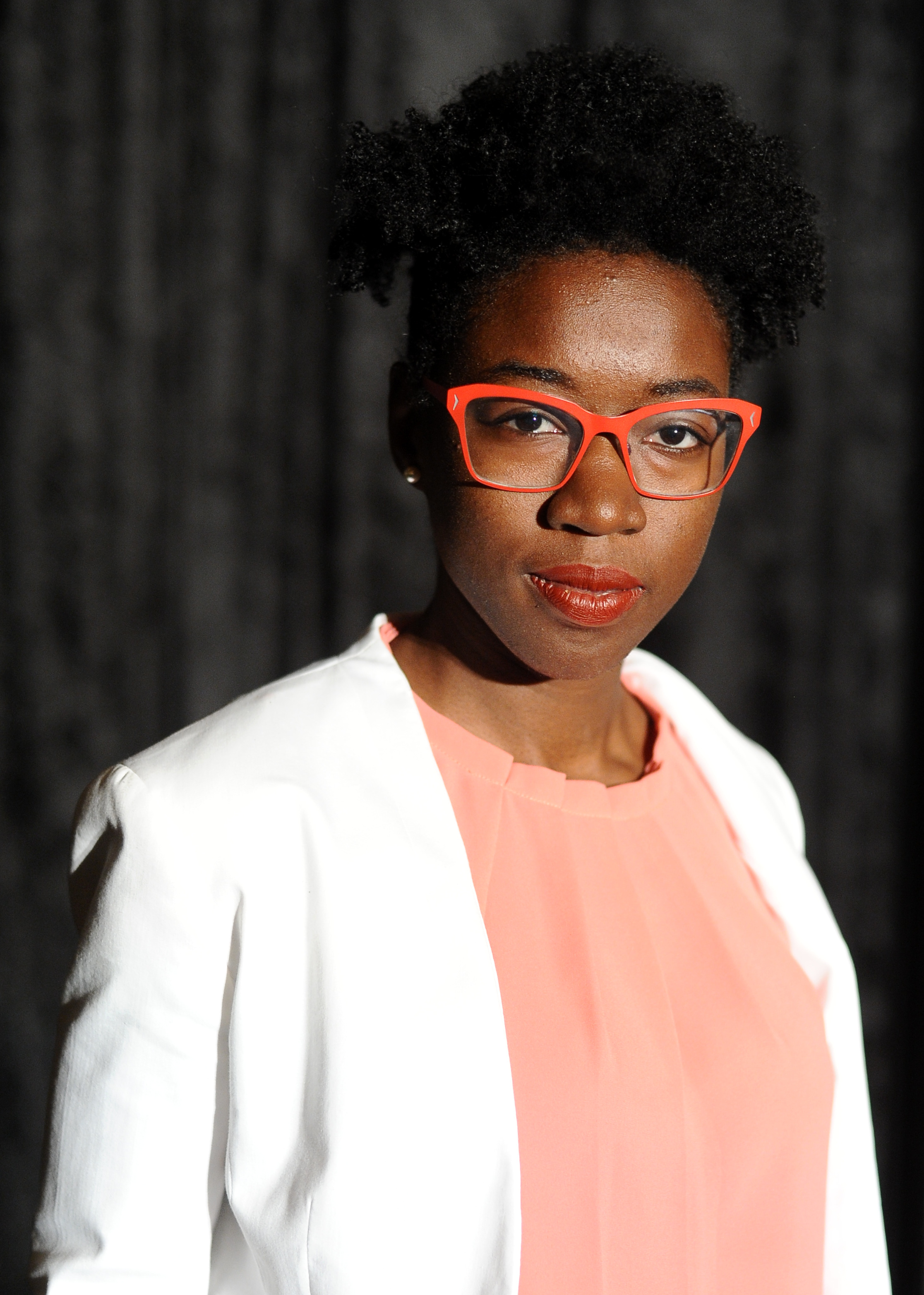
- Buolamwini at Wikimania 2018
- Born: Joy Adowaa Buolamwini; 23 January 1990 (age 36); Edmonton, Alberta, Canada
- Education: Cordova High School; Georgia Institute of Technology (BS); Jesus College, Oxford (MS); Massachusetts Institute of Technology (MS, PhD)
- Occupations: Computer scientist and digital activist
- Known for: Algorithmic Justice League
- Scientific career
- Fields: Media Arts & Sciences; Computer science Algorithmic bias
- Workplaces: MIT Media Lab
- Theses: Gender shades : intersectional phenotypic and demographic evaluation of face datasets and gender classifiers (2017); Facing the Coded Gaze with Evocative Audits and Algorithmic Audits (2022)
- Doctoral advisor: Ethan Zuckerman
- Buolamwini's voice recorded July 2018
- Website: www.poetofcode.com

Joy Adowaa Buolamwini is a Canadian-American computer scientist and digital activist formerly based at the MIT Media Lab. She founded the Algorithmic Justice League (AJL), an organization that works to challenge bias in decision-making software, using art, advocacy, and research to highlight the social implications and harms of artificial intelligence (AI).

== Early life and education ==
Buolamwini was born in Edmonton, Alberta, grew up in Mississippi, and attended Cordova High School in Cordova, Tennessee. At the age of nine, she was inspired by Kismet, the MIT robot, and taught herself XHTML, JavaScript and PHP. As a student-athlete, she was a competitive pole vaulter and played basketball. In a podcast episode she recorded on Brené Brown's show "Dare to Lead", she recalls completing her AP Physics homework between basketball break times.

As an undergraduate, Buolamwini studied computer science at the Georgia Institute of Technology, where she researched health informatics. She graduated as a Stamps President's Scholar from Georgia Tech in 2012, and was the youngest finalist of the Georgia Tech InVenture Prize in 2009.

Buolamwini is a Rhodes Scholar, a Fulbright fellow, a Stamps Scholar, an Astronaut Scholar, and an Anita Borg Institute scholar. As a Rhodes Scholar, she studied learning and technology at the University of Oxford, where she was a student based at Jesus College, Oxford. During her scholarship she took part in the first formal Service Year, working on community focused projects. She was awarded a master's degree in Media Arts & Sciences from MIT in 2017 for research supervised by Ethan Zuckerman. She was awarded a PhD degree in Media Arts & Sciences from the MIT Media Lab in 2022 with a thesis on Facing the Coded Gaze with Evocative Audits and Algorithmic Audits.

== Impact and Legacy ==
Buolamwini's work has had a profound impact on the field of artificial intelligence and the broader conversation around algorithmic bias. Her research has not only exposed critical flaws in facial recognition technology but has also sparked meaningful policy changes and corporate accountability at the highest levels. Her landmark 2018 study, "Gender Shades," co-authored with Timnit Gebru, revealed that facial recognition systems from major technology companies, including IBM, Microsoft, and Face++, performed significantly worse on darker-skinned faces, particularly women. Error rates for darker-skinned women were found to be as high as 34.7%, compared to an error rate of less than 1% for lighter-skinned men. Following the publication of this research, IBM, Microsoft, and Amazon all announced significant updates to their facial recognition products, with IBM eventually discontinuing its facial recognition software altogether in 2020. Buolamwini has testified before the United States Congress on multiple occasions, advocating for stronger regulation of facial recognition technology and artificial intelligence more broadly. Her testimony has contributed to legislative efforts at both the federal and state levels, including the introduction of the Algorithmic Accountability Act. Her 2020 documentary, Coded Bias, directed by Shalini Kantayya, brought her work to a global audience. The film, which premiered at the Sundance Film Festival, chronicles Buolamwini's journey from discovering bias in facial recognition software to becoming one of the leading voices in the movement for algorithmic justice. The documentary was nominated for an Emmy Award. Beyond her research and advocacy, Buolamwini has been recognized with numerous prestigious awards. She was named one of Time magazine's 100 Most Influential People, received the MIT Media Lab's Disobedience Award, and was awarded the Rhodes Scholarship. Her book, Unmasking AI: My Mission to Protect What is Human in a World of Machines, published in 2023, further cemented her position as one of the most important voices in the conversation around ethical artificial intelligence. Buolamwini's legacy lies in her ability to bridge the gap between technical research and public policy, ensuring that the voices of marginalized communities are represented in the development of technologies that increasingly shape everyday life.

== Career and research ==
In 2011, Buolamwini worked with the trachoma program at the Carter Center to develop an Android-based assessment system for use in Ethiopia.

Interface from Joy Buolamwini's Gender Shades project evaluating biases in facial recognition systems

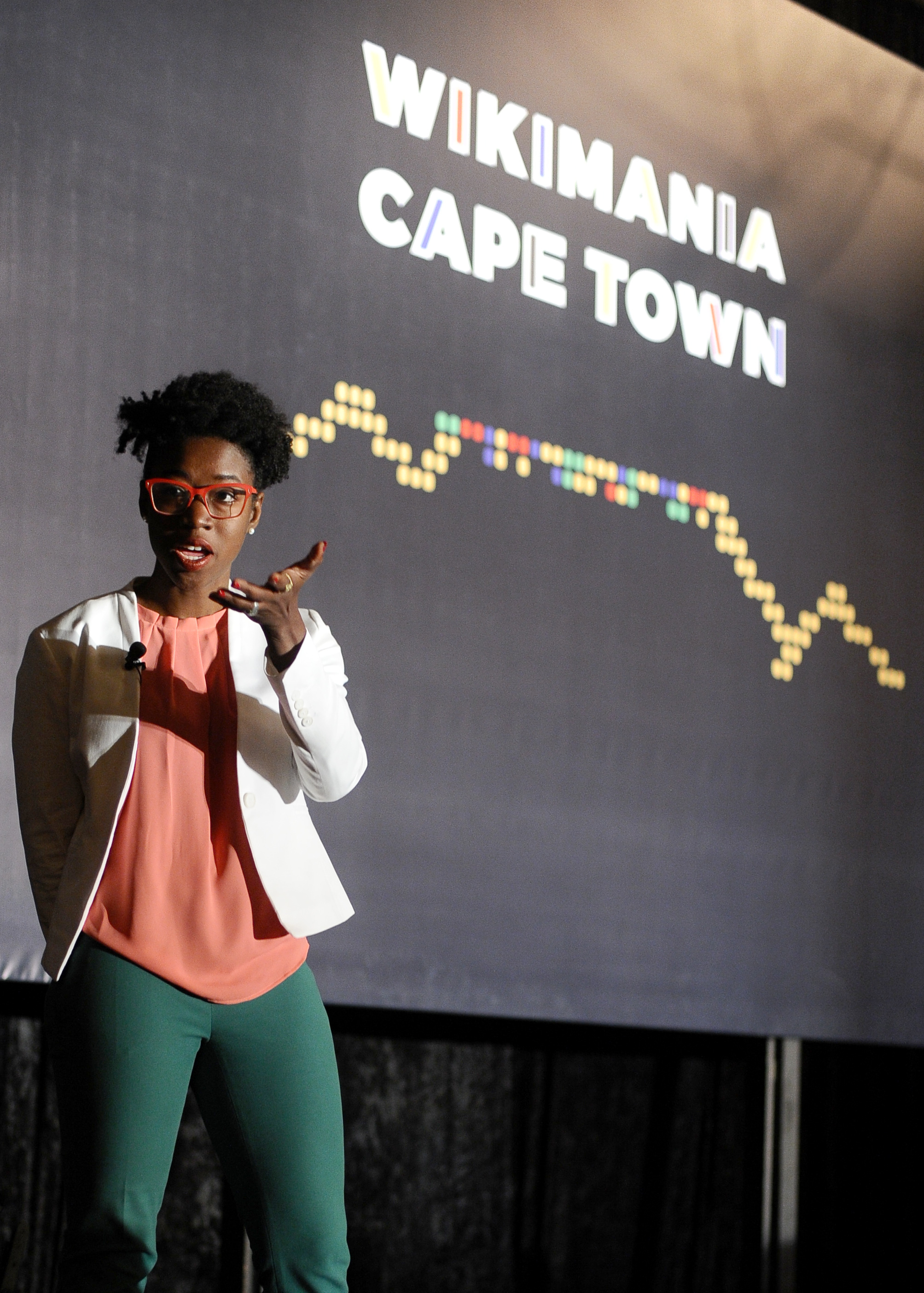
Joy Buolamwini at Wikimania 2018 in Cape Town

As a Fulbright fellow, in 2013 she worked with local computer scientists in Zambia to help Zambian youth become technology creators. On September 14, 2016, Buolamwini appeared at the White House summit on Computer Science for All.

Buolamwini is widely recognized for her research on bias in facial recognition systems. While working at the MIT Media Lab, she discovered that many artificial intelligence systems had difficulty accurately identifying darker-skinned individuals, particularly women. In some instances, the systems failed to detect her face unless she wore a white mask.

This observation led her to conduct a broader study evaluating commercial facial recognition technologies. Her research, published in Gender Shades: Intersectional Accuracy Disparities in Commercial Gender Classification, found that error rates were significantly higher for darker-skinned women compared to lighter-skinned men.

She introduced the term "coded gaze" to describe how algorithmic systems can reflect the biases of their creators. Her work has contributed to increased awareness of the ethical implications of artificial intelligence and the risks of biased data in decision-making systems.

Following the publication of her research, major technology companies such as IBM, Microsoft, and Amazon reevaluated their facial recognition technologies, with some pausing or modifying their systems in response to concerns about bias.

Buolamwini was a researcher at the MIT Media Lab, where she worked to identify bias in algorithms and to develop practices for accountability during their design. She would refer the lab as the "Future Factory", a cocoon for dreamers like herself to be immersed in fantasy to build technology. At the lab, Buolamwini was a member of Ethan Zuckerman's Center for Civic Media group. During her research, Buolamwini showed 1,000 faces to facial recognition systems and asked the systems to identify whether faces were female or male, and found that the software found it hard to identify dark-skinned women. Her project, Gender Shades, became part of her MIT thesis. Her 2018 paper Gender Shades: Intersectional Accuracy Disparities in Commercial Gender Classification prompted responses from IBM and Microsoft to take corrective actions to improve the accuracy of their algorithms, swiftly improved their software demonstrating her influence on the industry. She also created the Aspire Mirror, a device that lets users see a reflection of themselves based on what inspires them. Her program, Algorithmic Justice League, aims to highlight the bias in code that can lead to discrimination against underrepresented groups. She has created two films, Code4Rights and Algorithmic Justice League: Unmasking Bias. Still the director, Code4rights is an advocacy organization started in 2012 intended to use technology to spread awareness of human rights. She served as Chief Technology Officer (CTO) for Techturized Inc., a hair-care technology company.

Buolamwini's research was cited in 2020 as an influence for Google and Microsoft in addressing gender and race bias in their products and processes.

She also served as an advisor to President Biden ahead of his administration's Executive Order 14110, released October 30, 2023. The order is also known as the Executive Order on Safe, Secure, and Trustworthy Development and Use of Artificial Intelligence (sometimes referred to as "Executive Order on Artificial Intelligence").

In 2023, she published her first book, Unmasking AI: My Mission to Protect What Is Human in a World of Machines, which chronicles her research. Through her book:

- Buolamwini delves into the social implications of AI and warns of the biases in facial analysis systems, as well as their potential harm to millions of people - especially if they reinforce existing stereotypes.
- She advocates for the development of inclusive datasets, transparent auditing, and ethical policies to mitigate the discriminatory impact of AI.

In 2025, Buolamwini was elected to the Board of Directors of the Legal Defense Fund, a nonprofit civil rights law organization.

== AI bias and gender equity ==
Dr. Joy Buolamwini's research on AI bias has been pivotal in advancing gender equity within engineering and technology. Her research found that AI-powered facial-recognition systems showed higher error rates when identifying darker-skinned women, with rates reaching 34.7%, compared to 0.8% for lighter-skinned men. These disparities indicated potential biases in algorithmic design, where biased training data and incomplete evaluation processes led to unequal technological outcomes based on both gender and skin tone.

Buolamwini's personal experience with AI performance limitations motivated her research into algorithmic bias. While working on a facial-recognition-based art project at the MIT Media Lab, she discovered that commercial AI systems could not consistently detect her face due to her darker skin. This frustration inspired her landmark research project Gender Shades, which rigorously evaluated facial analysis systems from IBM, Microsoft, and Face++. Her study revealed that these systems were most accurate for lighter-skinned men, with error rates as low as 1%, while their accuracy plummeted for darker-skinned women, with misclassification rates as high as 47%.

Realizing that these failures stemmed from data imbalances, Buolamwini introduced the Pilot Parliaments Benchmark, a diverse dataset designed to address the lack of representation in typical AI training sets, which were composed of over 75% male and 80% lighter-skinned faces. This new benchmark set a critical precedent for evaluating and improving AI performance by ensuring more equitable testing standards.

Her findings contributed to significant changes in the tech industry. Following the publication of her research, companies such as IBM and Microsoft took steps to improve their algorithms, reducing bias and enhancing accuracy. However, Buolamwini has noted that improved technical accuracy alone does not eliminate risks of potential misuse in areas such as racial profiling, surveillance, and hiring decisions.

To address these concerns, Buolamwini co-founded the Safe Face Pledge, encouraging tech companies to adopt ethical AI practices. The pledge prohibits weaponizing facial recognition, bans lawless police use, and demands transparency in government surveillance applications. Her advocacy emphasizes that achieving fairness in AI development requires a multi-faceted approach, including regulatory frameworks and collaborative efforts.

=== Activism ===
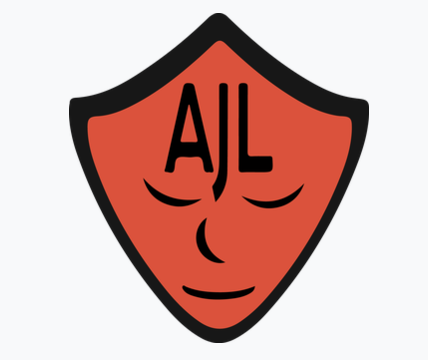
Logo of the Algorithmic Justice League

Buolamwini founded the Algorithmic Justice League (AJL) in 2016 to promote equitable and accountable artificial intelligence (AI). The AJL organization integrates art and research to examine societal implications and reduce AI-related harms. The company works to raise public awareness of AI's impact while advancing research on bias mitigation. It also addresses issues at the intersection of equity and technology, promoting more inclusive and accessible engineering systems. AJL has also encouraged public engagement through interactive campaigns, exhibitions, and educational initiatives, ensuring a broad audience is informed about the impact of biased algorithms on gender equity.

To broaden its outreach, AJL has partnered with organizations such as Black Girls Code to encourage African-American girls to pursue STEM careers, thereby fostering more diversity in the tech industry. AJL conducts workshops and provides resources aimed at educating the public and tech community about AI biases, with a focus on empowering underrepresented genders to engage with and challenge these systems.

The success of AJL reflects the collective efforts of its team. Some key members of the Algorithmic Justice League include Rachel Fagen, the Chief of Staff, who focuses on organizational development and building connections to promote equitable and accountable AI. Aurum Linh serves as the AI Harms Analyst, dedicated to identifying and mitigating the adverse effects of artificial intelligence. The Algorithm Justice League works with various groups, including CORE funders, advisory committees, and research collaborators, to enhance transparency and accountability in AI systems, ensuring that its advocacy efforts remain impactful and inclusive.

The AJL website provides information and a live blog. There are several sections on the site where users can share stories, and donate or write to US Congressional representatives. Buolamwini has influenced policy discussions to address gender discrimination in AI applications, advocating for regulations that ensure fairness in AI-powered decision-making systems. In 2019, she testified before the United States House Committee on Oversight and Reform about the risks of facial recognition technology. Her testimony emphasized the need for accountability in the deployment of facial recognition technologies, particularly in areas where these systems could exacerbate gender inequities.

She believed the executive order fell short in terms of redress, or consequences, for AI systems that hurt minority communities. Her efforts supported the inclusion of measures to address discrimination in AI applications, particularly in areas like hiring, housing, and criminal justice. Biden's executive order is a “long and ongoing process” which is happening because the industry is not incentivized to do so she said.

Joy Buolamwini, through the Algorithmic Justice League (AJL), has been instrumental in advocating for the inclusion and support of women, transgender, and non-binary individuals in the technology sector. Her initiatives focus on exposing and mitigating biases in artificial intelligence (AI) that disproportionately affect these underrepresented groups.

Buolamwini has led campaigns targeting gender equity in AI and technology. In 2021, she collaborated with Olay on the Decode the Bias campaign, which examined biases in beauty algorithms affecting women of color. This initiative evaluated Olay's Skin Advisor System to ensure equitable treatment across all skin tones.

Building on these initiatives, AJL launched the Community Reporting of Algorithmic System Harms (CRASH), which unites key stakeholders to develop tools that enable broader participation in creating accountable and equitable AI systems, directly addressing issues that affect underrepresented genders.

=== Voicing Erasure ===
The Voicing Erasure section on the AJL website hosts spoken pieces by Buolamwini, Allison Koenecke, Safiya Noble, Ruha Benjamin, Kimberlé Crenshaw, Megan Smith, and Sasha Costanza-Chock about bias in voice systems. Buolamwini and Koenecke are the lead researchers on the website working to uncovering biases of voice systems. They've written that speech recognition systems have the most trouble with African-American Vernacular English speakers, and that these systems are secretly listening to users' conversations. They have also written about what they regard as harmful gender stereotypes perpetuated by the voice recognition systems in Siri, Amazon Alexa, and Microsoft Cortana.

While her methodology and results have faced criticism from industries like Amazon, she explained in her TED talk how she addressed the 'coded gaze' by highlighting its neglect of the intersection between “social impact, technology, and inclusion.

Her Voicing Erasure project highlights gender equity by exposing biases in voice recognition systems, particularly those that often fail to accurately process speech from women and non-binary individuals. This project advocates for more inclusive AI development by raising awareness of these limitations.

=== The Coded Gaze ===
The Coded Gaze is a mini-documentary that debuted at the Museum of Fine Arts, Boston in 2016, and is currently available via YouTube. Buolamwini uses the mini documentary to talk about the bias that she believes lies in artificial intelligence's function. The inspiration for the mini documentary and her research came when she was at MIT, creating her art "Aspire Mirror," which uses facial recognition to reflect another person who inspires a user, onto that user's face. Buolamwini anticipated having Serena Williams, another dark-skinned woman, reflected onto her face. However, the technology did not recognize her face. Buolamwini's research investigated why this happened, and consequently led Buolamwini to conclude that the exclusion of people who look like her was a result of a practice she called the "Coded Gaze." She further discusses this concept in the mini documentary, "The Coded Gaze." The documentary explores how AI can be subject to racial and gender biases that reflect the views and cultural backgrounds of those who develop it.

=== Coded Bias ===
Coded Bias is a documentary film directed by Shalini Kantayya that features Buolamwini's research about AI inaccuracies in facial recognition technology and automated assessment software. It focuses on what the film's creators regard as a lack of regulation of facial recognition tools sold by IBM, Microsoft, and Amazon, and which they say perpetuates racial and gender bias. The film describes a dispute between Brooklyn tenants and a building management company that tried to use facial recognition to control entry to a building. The film featured Weapons of Math Destruction author Cathy O'Neill and members of Big Brother Watch in London, including Silkie Carlo. On April 5, 2021, the documentary was made available to stream on Netflix.

== Exhibitions ==
Projects conducted by Algorithmic Justice League have been exhibited at art institutions including the Barbican Centre in London, UK, and Ars Electronica in Linz, Austria.

- The Criminal Type (2019) Exhibition at APEXART, New York, NY, US
- Understanding AI (2019) Exhibition at Ars Electronica Center, Linz, Austria
- AI: More than Human (2019) Exhibition at the Barbican Centre, London, UK
- Nine Moments for Now (2018) Exhibition at the Hutchins Center, Harvard University, Cambridge, MA, US
- Big Bang Data (2018) Exhibition at MIT Museum, Cambridge, MA, US

== Awards and honors ==
In 2017, Buolamwini was awarded the grand prize in the professional category in the Search for Hidden Figures contest, tied to the release of the film Hidden Figures in December 2016. The contest, sponsored by PepsiCo and 21st Century Fox, was intended to "help uncover the next generation of female leaders in science, technology, engineering and math," and attracted 7,300 submissions from young women across the United States.

Buolamwini delivered a TEDx talk at Beacon Street entitled How I'm fighting bias in algorithms. In 2018, she appeared on the TED Radio Hour. She was featured on Amy Poehler's Smart Girls in 2018. Fast Company magazine listed her as one of four "design heroes who are defending democracy online." She was listed as one of BBC's 100 Women in 2018.

In 2019, Buolamwini was listed in Fortune magazine's 2019 list of the "World's 50 Greatest Leaders," where the magazine described her as "the conscience of the A.I. revolution." She also made the inaugural Time 100 Next list in 2019. In 2020, Buolamwini featured in a women's empowerment campaign by the clothing company Levi's for International Women's Day. She was also featured in the documentary Coded Bias. In 2020, an honoree of the Great Immigrants Award named by Carnegie Corporation of New York.

In 2022, Buolamwini was named the ASQ Hutchens Medalist. In 2023, she was listed in the Time 100 AI.

On June 9, 2024, Buolamwini was awarded an honorary Doctor of Science degree from Dartmouth College for her work in exposing biases in AI systems and preventing AI harms. She was also invited as the keynote speaker for Dartmouth's 2024 Social Justice Awards.

In November 2024, Buolamwini was awarded the Center for the Study of African American Religious Life (CSAARL) Octavia Butler Award in Computer Science.

On March 14, 2024, Buolamwini was awarded the NAACP Archwell Foundation Digital Civil Rights Activist Award. In addition to this award, Buolamwini was given $100,000 to put towards new work in the field.

In November 2025, Buolamwini attended a Vatican conference on the dignity of children in the age of artificial intelligence, where she presented a copy of Unmasking AI to Pope Leo XIV.

== Personal life ==
Buolamwini was born in Edmonton, Alberta, Canada to Ghanaian immigrants. She has lived in Ghana; Barcelona, Spain; Oxford, United Kingdom; and, in the U.S., Memphis, Tennessee, and Atlanta, Georgia. She describes herself as a "daughter of the science and of the arts", her father being an Academic and her mother an artist, as well as a Poet of Code.

== See also ==
- Timnit Gebru
- Algorithmic bias
- Facial recognition system
- Algorithmic Justice League
- AI ethics
