= Charles Veitch =

Scottish YouTuber

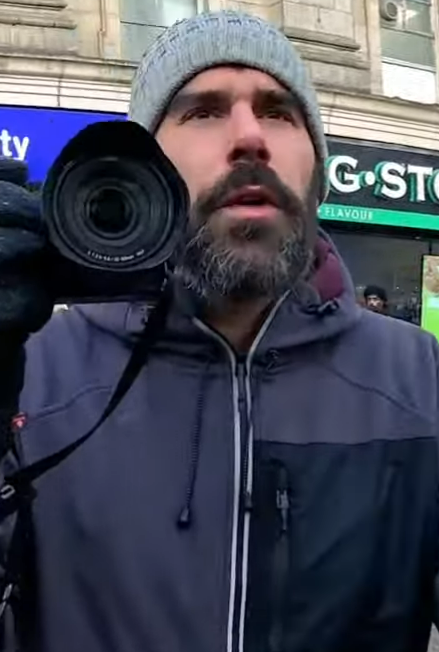
- Veitch in 2025
- Born: 5 August 1980 (age 46); Rio de Janeiro, Brazil
- Education: University of Edinburgh
- Occupation: YouTuber

YouTube information
- Channel: Charles Veitch
- Subscribers: 863,000
- Views: 367 million
- Last updated: 08 October 2026

Charles Torres Veitch (born 5 August 1980) is a Brazilian-Scottish YouTuber and activist.

== Personal life ==
Veitch was born on 5 August 1980 in Rio de Janeiro, Brazil, to a Brazilian mother and a Scottish merchant seaman. He later migrated to England. His father later became an oil worker. He attended Edinburgh Academy and received a Master of Arts in philosophy from the University of Edinburgh. Following university, Veitch joined the Territorial Army.

In 2011 and 2012, he dated and lived with libertarian activist Silkie Carlo. He has at least one child with a different woman.

== Prior to activism ==
Circa 2001, he started working in the City of London, at some point working at HBOS in wealth management. He was laid off from HBOS in 2009 due to the 2008 financial crisis.

He then dedicated himself to making guerilla videos and protesting.

Since at least 2015, he has posted YouTube videos of him walking in northern and midland towns in England. He narrates his videos and comments on and interacts with people on the streets.

== Views ==
In 2006, he became sympathetic to the 9/11 truth movement and started to post videos on YouTube of himself and friends protesting.

In 2011, he was described as an anarchist. Veitch currently identifies as a Zionist and has attended anti-immigration protests.

In 2011, he was involved with the BBC's 9/11: Conspiracy Road Trip documentary. According to an article in Slate, by the third day of speaking with people he had believed responsible, he started to question his beliefs about 9/11, saying he was changing to a less paranoid mindset. In June, Veitch posted on his blog that he no longer believed 9/11 was faked by the United States government. His decision to denounce the 9/11 conspiracy theories drew backlash from Alex Jones and David Icke, as well as death threats and unfounded criminal allegations.

In August 2025, he attended a UKIP rally in Liverpool as part of its mass deportations tour and criticized those "who cannot stand the idea of English people celebrating England". The anti-fascist organization Hope not Hate have commented that Veitch has spread "anti-migrant hate" and antagonises those he meets to maximise his video views.

== Legal proceedings ==
In June 2010, Veitch was arrested at Toronto Pearson International Airport and charged with impersonating a police officer in connection with an incident near the security perimeter for the 2010 G20 Toronto summit.

In April 2011, he was arrested ahead of the wedding of Prince William and Catherine Middleton on suspicion of conspiracy to cause a public nuisance and breach of the peace. Police believed he was planning to cause disruption in Soho Square.

In 2015, Veitch was fined following a clash with British National Party supporters at an anti-cuts protest.

In February 2026, Veitch was charged with a Section 4A public order offence and released on bail with conditions prohibiting him from entering Manchester city centre inside the ring road. At Manchester Magistrates' Court in June, he pleaded not guilty and was scheduled to stand trial in October 2027.
