= Michael Coe (American football) =

American gridiron football player (born 1983)

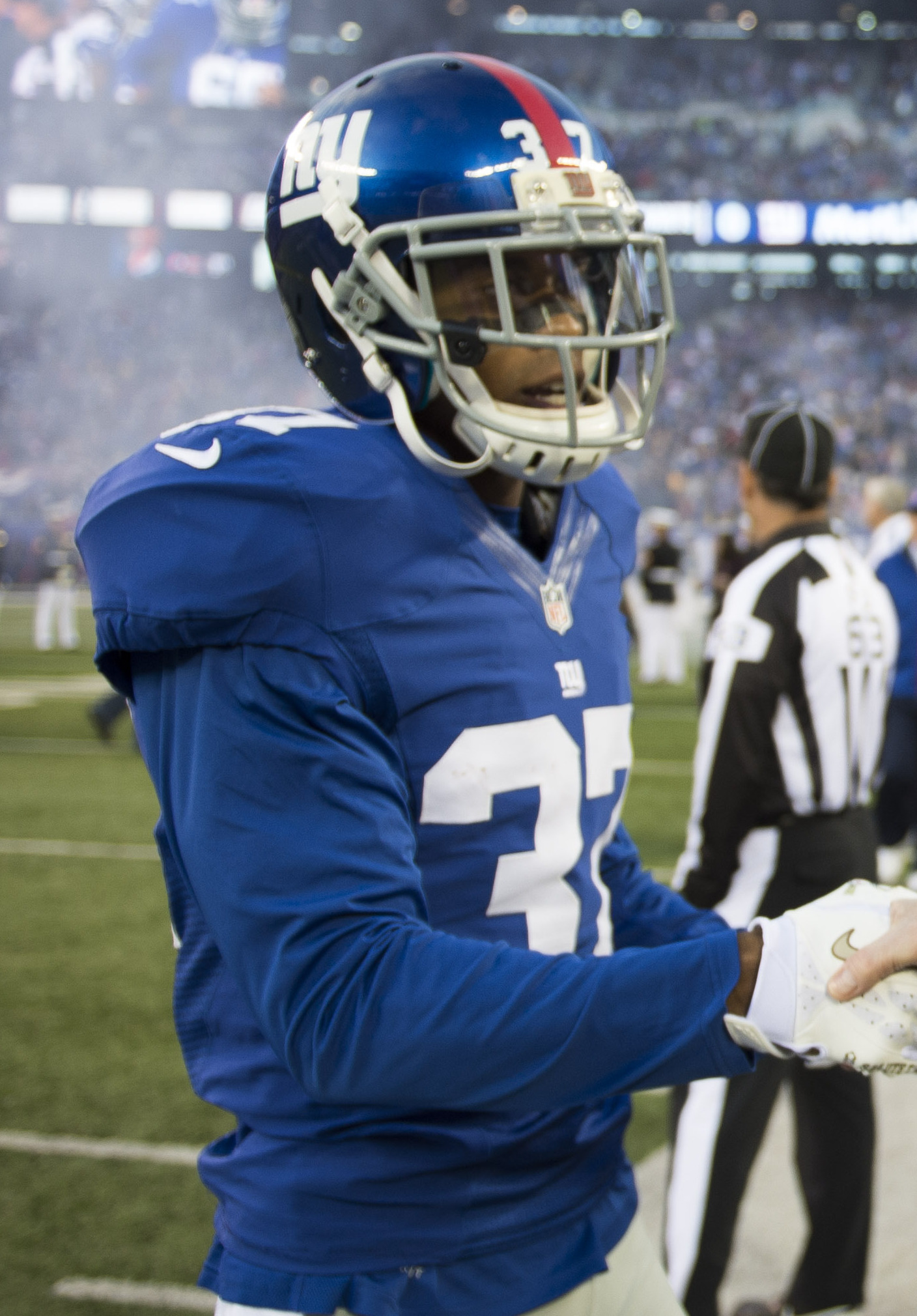
- Coe with the Giants in 2012

No. 20, 25, 26, 32, 37
- Position: Cornerback

Personal information
- Born: December 17, 1983 (age 42); Louisville, Kentucky, U.S.
- Listed height: 6 ft 1 in (1.85 m)
- Listed weight: 190 lb (86 kg)

Career information
- High school: Cordova (Memphis, Tennessee)
- College: Alabama State
- NFL draft: 2007: 5th round, 173rd overall pick

Career history
- Indianapolis Colts (2007–2008); New York Giants (2009)*; Jacksonville Jaguars (2009−2010); New York Giants (2010−2012); Miami Dolphins (2012); Dallas Cowboys (2012); Hamilton Tiger-Cats (2014)
- * Offseason or practice squad member only

Awards and highlights
- Super Bowl champion (XLVI); All-SWAC (2006)

Career NFL statistics
- Total tackles: 43
- Fumble recoveries: 2
- Pass deflections: 4
- Stats at Pro Football Reference

Michael Allan Coe (born December 17, 1983) is an American former professional football player who was a cornerback in the National Football League (NFL) for the Indianapolis Colts, Jacksonville Jaguars, New York Giants, Miami Dolphins, and Dallas Cowboys. He also was a member of the Hamilton Tiger-Cats in the Canadian Football League (CFL). He played college football for the Alabama State Hornets.

== Early life ==
Coe attended Cordova High School in Memphis, Tennessee. As a junior, he collected 20 receptions for 675 yards and 4 touchdowns.

As a senior, he was a two-way player at wide receiver and cornerback, registering over 1,400 receiving yards, 25 tackles, 5 interceptions and 10 passes defensed. He received All-state, All-Memphis, All-metro, All-region, All-conference and Tennessee Class 5A Offensive Player of the Year honors.

In track, he set the school record in the 400 metres and won the conference title four times in that competition.

== College career ==
Coe accepted a football scholarship from the University of Arkansas. As a redshirt freshman, he appeared in 13 games as a backup cornerback, making 4 tackles and one pass defensed.

As a sophomore, he was limited with injuries and appeared in 8 games with 6 starts at cornerback. He tallied 24 tackles, 2 interceptions and 4 passes defensed.

As a junior, he appeared in all 11 games with 8 starts, posting 30 tackles (one for loss), 3 interceptions (tied for second on the team), 7 passes defensed, one forced fumble, one blocked kick and 8 punt returns for 63 yards (7.9-yard avg.). After the season, he decided to transfer to Division I-AA Alabama State University, where his father was the football head coach at the time.

As a senior, he began the season at free safety until cornerback Brandon Averett was lost for the season. He also was the team's primary punt returner. He started all 11 games (7 at left cornerback and 4 at free safety), making 42 tackles, 1.5 sacks, 2 interceptions (tied for the team lead), 14 passes defensed (led the conference), one fumble recovery and 21 punt returns for an 8.4-yard average.

He finished his college career after appearing in 43 games, recording 100 tackles (5 for loss), 1.5 sacks, 7 interceptions, 26 passes defensed, 7 interceptions, one forced fumble, one fumble recovery and one blocked kick.

== Professional career ==
Pre-draft measurables
Height	Weight	Arm length	Hand span	40-yard dash	10-yard split	20-yard split	20-yard shuttle	Three-cone drill	Vertical jump	Broad jump	Bench press
6 ft 0 5/8 in (1.84 m)	190 lb (86 kg)	33 1/2 in (0.85 m)	9 3/4 in (0.25 m)	4.49 s	1.54 s	2.59 s	4.31 s	6.78 s	35.0 in (0.89 m)	10 ft 2 in (3.10 m)	17 reps
All values from NFL Combine/Pro Day

=== Indianapolis Colts ===
Coe was selected by the Indianapolis Colts in the fifth round (173rd overall) of the 2007 NFL draft. As a rookie, he appeared in 6 games and was declared inactive in 10 contests. He posted 7 tackles (5 solo), one pass defensed, one fumble recovery and 5 special teams tackles. He blocked a punt for a safety against the Baltimore Ravens.

In 2008, he injured his meniscus during a practice. On August 12, he was placed on the injured reserve list with a left knee injury. In 2009, he tore an abdominal muscle while warming up for the preseason opener against the Minnesota Vikings. He was waived injured on August 30.

=== New York Giants (first stint) ===
On September 15, 2009, he was signed to the New York Giants practice squad.

=== Jacksonville Jaguars ===
On November 25, 2009, he was signed by the Jacksonville Jaguars from the Giants practice squad. He appeared in the final 5 games. He played mainly on special teams, making 3 tackles. He was released on September 26, 2010.

=== New York Giants (second stint) ===
On September 29, 2010, he was signed to the New York Giants practice squad. He was promoted to the active roster on November 27.

In 2011, he registered 10 tackles on defense and special teams in a reserve role. He was injured in Week 10 and placed on the injured reserve list with a shoulder injury on November 21.

In 2012, he appeared in 7 games and made 13 tackles, but was limited with a hamstring injury. He was placed on the injured reserve list on November 10. He was waived injured on November 26.

=== Miami Dolphins ===
On November 28, 2012, he was signed as a free agent by the Miami Dolphins. He played in one game and was declared inactive for another one. On December 10, he was cut to make room for wide receiver Armon Binns.

=== Dallas Cowboys ===
On December 11, 2012, he was claimed off waivers by the Dallas Cowboys. He played in 3 games mostly in dime packages and special teams. He appeared in 3 games, making one defensive tackle and one special teams tackle. He wasn't re-signed after the season.

=== Hamilton Tiger-Cats ===
On May 27, 2014, he signed with the Hamilton Tiger-Cats of the Canadian Football League. He was released on May 26, 2015.

== Post-playing career ==
On May 27, 2022, Coe was hired by the Carolina Panthers to serve as the team's New England area scout. On May 4, 2024, Coe was let go by the Panthers organization.

== Personal life ==
His father Charles Coe is a football college coach.
