= Facial recognition =

Facial recognition or face recognition may refer to:

- Face detection, often a step done before facial recognition
- Face perception, the process by which the human brain understands and interprets the face
- Pareidolia, which involves, in part, seeing images of faces in clouds and other scenes
- Facial recognition system, an automated system with the ability to identify individuals by their facial characteristics
