= Silkie Carlo =

British libertarian activist (born 1989)

Silkie Carlo (born November 1989) is an English libertarian civil rights advocate who has been the director of the British civil liberties NGO Big Brother Watch since January 2018.

During 2011 and 2012, she dated, lived with, and protested with Charles Veitch, whom she defended after he was arrested for planning to disrupt the wedding of Prince William and Catherine Middleton, by which she was 'outraged'.

She was described as a 'beautiful conspiracy theorist' by Vice magazine in 2013.

She read Politics, Psychology, and Sociology, at the University of Cambridge.

She organises CryptoPartyLDN and has organised CryptoParties in the UK and Europe since 2013.

She worked on the official defence-fund for Edward Snowden, the Courage Foundation.

She co-authored, with Arjen Kamphuis, Information Security for Journalists, which was commissioned by the Centre for Investigative Journalism and published during July 2014.

She also worked at the human-rights organisation Liberty, at which she was Senior Advocacy Officer who led work on Technology and Human Rights and drove a legal challenge to the Investigatory Powers Act 2016.

She was a director of the anti-monarchy campaign Republic between 2021 and 2022.

She appears in the 2020 American documentary film Coded Bias, and in the 2024 film 2073.

== See also ==
- Civil liberties in the United Kingdom
