= Michael Campbell-Brown =

Scottish businessman and fugitive

Michael Campbell-Brown (born Michael Robert Alexander Brown; 19 April 1966) is a Scottish businessman and fugitive convicted in absentia of theft, perjury and perverting the course of justice. Between 10 February and 30 March 2005 he donated £2.4 million to the Liberal Democrats. He was the largest donor the party had ever had, giving ten times more than anything it had received before.

Campbell-Brown has worked for Serco since 2019.

== Early life and legal issues ==
Brown was born on 19 April 1966 into a family from Glasgow. His father, Ian, was an executive at one of Scotland's largest whisky producers. He attended his local school and later completed a City and Guilds qualification in catering at the Glasgow College of Food Technology.

Brown resided in Mallorca, Spain and claimed to have been an international bond trader, whose clients were vetted by United States embassy officials and Special Branch before he accepted their money. Brown's clients included former Manchester United chairman Martin Edwards. Brown married Sharon Campbell in 1993.

In June 2008, after being charged with various counts of fraud and money laundering, Brown fled bail and an arrest warrant was subsequently issued. The charges of fraud and money laundering were later discharged by the judge at trial.

Brown was last reported to reside on Templewood Avenue in Hampstead, northwest London. He told various former clients he had been suffering from cancer and adopted the surname Campbell-Brown before he disappeared. In the weeks leading up to his disappearance, neighbours of Brown's Hampstead residence reported that he altered his appearance, growing a full beard in place of his usual goatee and allowing his typically dyed blond hair to revert to its natural grey. His legal representative denied allegations that these changes were intended to aid in evading authorities.

An extensive investigation was carried out by the City of London Police, both domestically and internationally. As part of the search, officers visited the residence of Paul Strasburger, a fellow Liberal Democrat donor who had previously provided bail for Brown.

It is believed that Brown resurfaced in the Caribbean later in 2008. Private investigators hired by two of his creditors reported that credit cards linked to Brown were used in Antigua and Barbuda during September and October of that year. Documents reviewed by The Observer indicated that a credit card issued under the name "M. Campbell-Brown"—an alias Brown had reportedly adopted shortly before disappearing—was used at cash machines in the region during that time.

In September 2011, it was reported by The Guardian that Brown was living in the Dominican Republic under the name Darren Patrick Nally. On 6 January 2012, he was arrested by the Dominican police.

== Trial and aftermath ==
In August 2008 Southwark Crown Court Judge Wadsworth decided that the trial could proceed in the defendant's absence and as private funding had run out to his legal team, Brown would be eligible for legal aid.

In November 2008, a trial was held at the Crown Court in the absence of the defendant, Brown. During the proceedings, the jury was informed that Brown had deliberately constructed a false persona characterized by apparent wealth and social prominence. This included fabrications such as claiming his father held a noble title, asserting connections with the royal family, and offering investors returns of up to 50%. According to prosecuting counsel Martin Edmunds QC, the funds obtained were used to finance an opulent lifestyle, cover business-related expenses, and provide earlier investors with fabricated returns.

Brown resided in a £49,000-per-year apartment in Mayfair, where he reportedly conducted meetings with associates, including an individual named Edwards. He also operated from a high-profile office in the same district and drove a Range Rover with the personalised registration "5 AVE." His expenditures included £2.5 million on a private jet, £400,000 on a yacht, and £327,000 on a home entertainment system for his residence in Majorca.

On 28 November 2008, after deliberating for nine and a half hours, the jury found Brown guilty on four counts: two charges of theft, one of providing false information, and one of perverting the course of justice. These offenses occurred between 9 February 2005 and 17 April 2006. Brown was convicted in absentia and sentenced to seven years' imprisonment.

Because he was residing in Majorca, Spain, at the time of the donation, and was not registered to vote in the United Kingdom, Michael Brown used a company name as the official legal donor. In October 2006 the High Court in London ruled that the company which Brown used to donate the money to the Liberal Democrats, 5th Avenue Partners, had never traded in bonds.

Robert Mann, a lawyer based in Los Angeles, filed a writ in the High Court seeking £683,000 from the Liberal Democrats, alleging that the party prioritized the financial gain over concerns regarding the origin of the funds.

On 20 November 2009, the Electoral Commission issued a press release, stating that:

Having considered all the evidence in this case, we have concluded that 5th Avenue Partners Limited met the requirements to be a permissible donor. The Electoral Commission will be taking no further action in this case

In April 2010, Brown was one of the subjects of Britain's first televised election debate.

== Post release work ==
After his release from prison in 2016, Brown now known as Michael Campbell-Brown, began blogging and giving talks on criminal justice issues. He worked in both publicly operated and privately managed prisons, including HM Prison Leicester and facilities run by G4S. His work focused on supporting new prisoners during their first days in custody, a period often associated with increased vulnerability and a higher risk of suicide.

In 2019, he joined Serco, a company that operates prisons. In this role, he contributed to improving induction procedures for newly arrived inmates and trained existing prisoners to serve as peer mentors. He described the early stages of custody as particularly distressing for many prisoners, noting that individuals often arrive feeling extremely anxious and uncertain about what will happen in the immediate hours and days following their arrival.

His work was temporarily suspended in 2018 following reports that Spanish authorities were investigating him in connection with alleged money laundering. Campbell-Brown denied being subject to any active investigation, and no official confirmation of such an inquiry was made public. He was later cleared to return to his role and was invited to speak at a conference for prison officers organised by the Butler Trust, a UK charity that promotes best practice in criminal justice.

Although he had previously supported the Liberal Democrats, Campbell-Brown later withdrew his support for the party. He criticised its handling of Charles Kennedy's leadership, claiming Kennedy was forced to resign due to concerns about his alcohol use. Referring to Kennedy’s death in 2015 at the age of 55, Campbell-Brown stated that the party bore some responsibility. A spokesperson for the Liberal Democrats declined to respond to the accusation, stating they would not dignify it with a reply.
