= Paul Strasburger, Baron Strasburger =

British businessman (born 1946)

The Right Honourable The Lord Strasburger
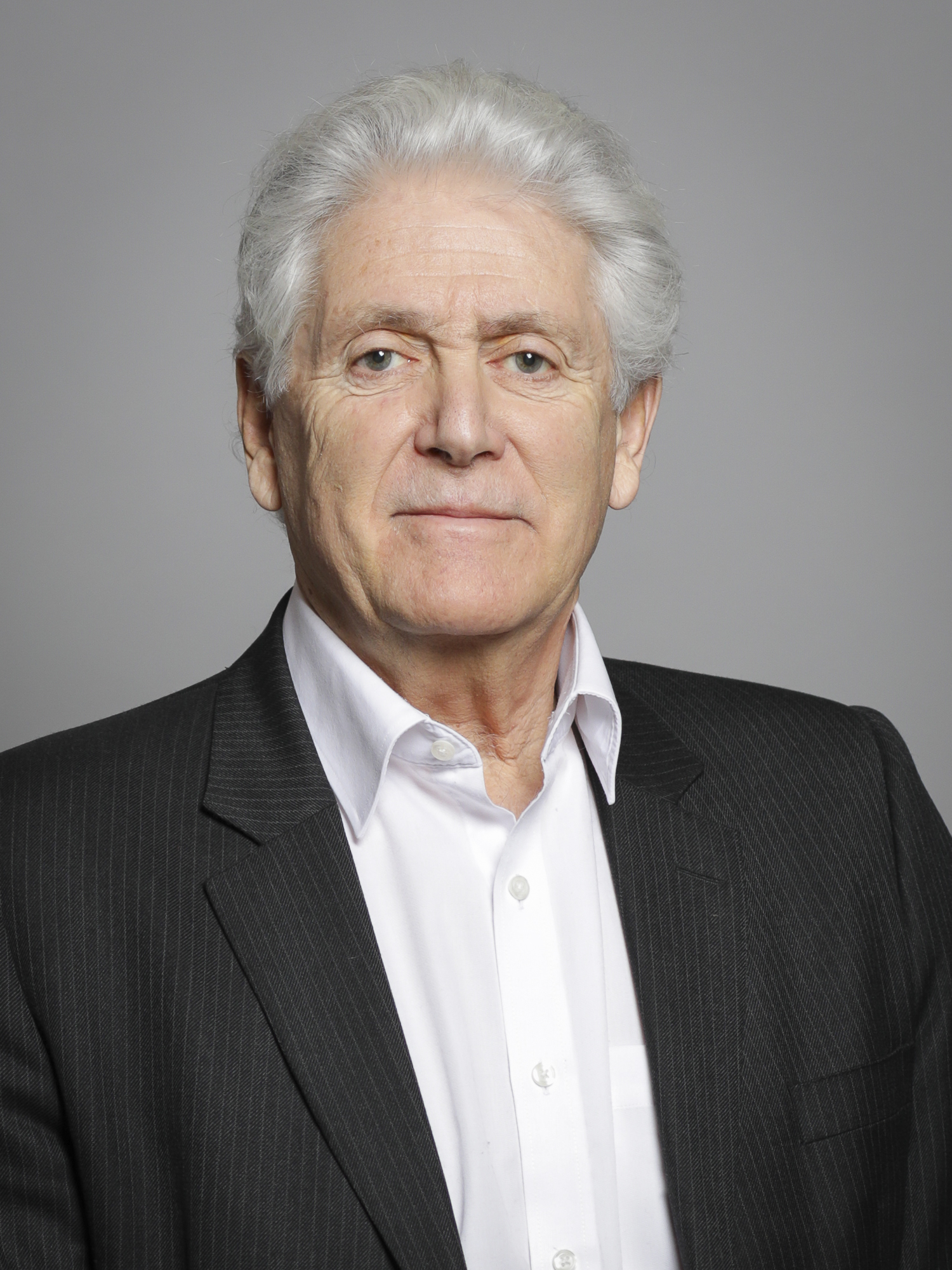
- Official portrait, 2019

Member of the House of Lords
- Lord Temporal
- Life peerage 10 January 2011

Personal details
- Born: 31 July 1946 (age 80)
- Party: Liberal Democrats

Paul Cline Strasburger, Baron Strasburger (born 31 July 1946) is a British Liberal Democrat politician, millionaire philanthropist and semi-retired businessman.

== Involvement with the Liberal Democrats ==
Strasburger first became involved in the Liberal Democrats in his home town of Bath, Somerset in 2005. Strasburger's appointment to the House of Lords was announced in November 2010, and he was created a life Peer on 10 January 2011 as Baron Strasburger, of Langridge in the County of Somerset, taking his seat on 12 January 2011.

Strasburger is a major donor to the Liberal Democrats. Before his appointment to the Lords, he had donated £709,900.40 to the Liberal Democrats, including £483,625 to the central party, £170,719.29 to his local constituency in Bath, and smaller sums to Lib Dem MPs Menzies Campbell, Don Foster and Chris Huhne, as well as constituency parties in Wells, Eastleigh and North East Somerset, all between 2006 and 2010.

Strasburger also contributed to the defence of Michael Brown, the convicted fraudster who fled after donating £2.4 million to the Liberal Democrats. Strasburger had also put up the bail money for Brown, which was forfeited when Brown fled.

Orders of precedence in the United Kingdom
Preceded by The Lord Risby	Gentlemen; Baron Strasburger	Followed by The Lord Marks of Henley-on-Thames
