= Shalini Kantayya =

American filmmaker and activist

- Kantayya at the Environmental Media Awards in 2016
- Born: Hartford, Connecticut, U.S.
- Education: Hampshire College (BA); City College of New York (MFA)
- Occupations: Filmmaker; activist; speaker
- Agent: Lavin Agency
- Known for: Fox's On the Lot, Catching the Sun, A Drop of Life
- Television: On the Lot, Breakthrough
- Website: www.shalinikantayya.net

Shalini Kantayya is an American filmmaker and environmental activist based in Brooklyn, New York, whose films explore human rights at the intersection of water, food, and renewable energy. Kantayya is best known for her debut feature documentary, Catching the Sun.

== Early life and education ==
Born to Indian parents with a mother who immigrated to the United States, Kantayya was born and raised in Hartford, Connecticut. She received a BA in Media Studies and International Human Rights from Hampshire College in Massachusetts, and an MFA in Film Direction from the City College of New York.

== Career ==
Kantayya finished in the top 10 out of 12,000 filmmakers on Fox’s On the Lot, a reality television talent show by Steven Spielberg and Mark Burnett.

She founded the production company 7th Empire Media in 2011.

== Filmography ==
=== A Drop of Life ===
Set in the near future, A DROP OF LIFE is the story of two women, a village teacher in rural India and an African American corporate executive, whose disparate lives intersect when they are both confronted with lack of access to clean drinking water.

Kantayya's sci-fi film about the world water crisis, A Drop of Life, was broadcast on national television in the U.S. and India. The film was used by the African Water Network as a tool to organize for water rights in 40 villages across Africa.

=== Catching the Sun ===
Kantayya's feature-length documentary, Catching the Sun, a film about the growth of the solar power industry, premiered at the 2015 Los Angeles Film Festival and was named a New York Times Critics’ Pick. It’s also part of American Film Showcase, and was planned to be shown at U.S. embassies and diplomatic missions abroad. Catching the Sun premiered globally on Netflix on Earth Day 2016 with Executive Producer Leonardo DiCaprio, and won the Best Feature award at the San Francisco Green Film Festival.

=== Breakthrough ===
In 2016, Kantayya directed an episode for the National Geographic series: Breakthrough. The series was executive produced by Ron Howard which will air in the spring of 2017 "in 440 million homes in 171 countries and in 45 languages, as well as on the Spanish language network Nat Geo Mundo". The new series documents "scientific explorers from leading universities and institutions and how their cutting-edge innovations and advancements will change our lives in the immediate future and beyond".

=== Coded Bias ===
Coded Bias is an American documentary film that premiered at the 2020 Sundance Film Festival. It was directed by Kantayya and follows researchers and advocates, principally MIT computer scientist Joy Buolamwini, as they explore how algorithms encode and propagate biases that can have far-reaching consequences.

== Awards and recognition ==
Kantayya has received recognition from the Sundance Documentary Program, IFP Spotlight on Documentary, New York Women in Film and Television, John D. and Catherine T. MacArthur Foundation, and the Jerome Foundation. She is a Sundance Fellow, TED Fellow, a finalist for the ABC | DGA Directing Fellowship, and a Fulbright Scholar.

== Personal life ==
In 2013, Kantayya revealed in a New York Times op-ed that she had been sexually assaulted in India while there to film a project for a United States–based organization. She proceeded to press charges and was later diagnosed with PTSD, which inspired her to speak out against sexual assault not only in India but also the United States.
