= Evan Lovett =

American content creator and podcaster

Evan Lovett is an American content creator and podcast host based in Los Angeles. He is the creator of L.A. in a Minute, a series of videos talking about the local news, history, food and culture in Los Angeles.

== Early life and education ==
Lovett was born in North Hills. His father is from Glendale. He attended the University of California, Los Angeles (UCLA), where he took journalism courses, and later worked at the Los Angeles Times.

== Career ==
Lovett began posting on TikTok in 2021. The idea came from a family discussion about screen time. His first videos summarized the day's Los Angeles news in under a minute.

The videos later covered local history, restaurants and landmarks. Other topics have drawn large audiences include In-N-Out Burger, the 405 freeway, King Taco and the city's water supply.

=== Podcast ===
Lovett hosts a weekly podcast, In a Minute with Evan Lovett. The podcast came from the L.A. in a Minute video series and tells the history and stories of Los Angeles. Guests have included, Michael Connelly, Mister Cartoon, Orel Hershiser, Estevan Oriol, James Goldstein, Keyshawn Johnson, Karen Bass, Fred Armisen, Jeanie Buss, Elex Michaelson, Matt Gutman, and Rick Caruso. By 2024 he was working on the project full time.
