= Big Brother Watch =

British non-profit campaign organisation

- Formation: 2009
- Founders: Matthew Elliott, Alex Deane
- Type: Advocacy group
- Location: Westminster
- Director: Silkie Carlo
- Funding: Owned by Mark Littlewood and Lord Strasburger
- Website: bigbrotherwatch.org.uk

Big Brother Watch is a non-party British civil liberties and privacy campaigning organisation. It was launched in 2009 by founding director Alex Deane to campaign against state surveillance and threats to civil liberties. It was founded by Matthew Elliott. Since January 2018, Silkie Carlo is the Director.

The organisation campaigns on a variety of issues including: The rise of the surveillance state, police use of oppressive technology, freedom and privacy online, the use of intrusive communications interception powers including the Regulation of Investigatory Powers Act, and the Investigatory Powers Act, the protection of personal information and wider data protection issues.

The organisation is headquartered in the China Works building, Vauxhall, London, and previously at 55 Tufton Street, London.

The name "Big Brother Watch" originates from George Orwell's novel Nineteen Eighty-Four, published in 1949.

== Founding ==
The group was established in August 2009 as a Private Limited Company owned by Mark Littlewood and Paul Strasburger and the official launch took place in January 2010 with Tony Benn and David Davis as guest speakers.

== Reports and campaigns ==
In 2012, Big Brother Watch shut down its website in protest at the Stop Online Piracy Act and PROTECT IP Act proposed United States legislation, warning that similar plans may be proposed in the UK.

Big Brother Watch was part of the anti-surveillance coalition Don't Spy On Us, which campaigned against the proposed bulk communications collection powers and lack of judicial safeguards in the Investigatory Powers Bill, now Investigatory Powers Act, in 2015 and 2016.

In 2017, Big Brother Watch took a case against the United Kingdom, together with Open Rights Group and English PEN, to the European Court of Human Rights arguing that British surveillance laws infringed British citizens' right to privacy.

In 2017 and 2018, the organisation campaigned against police retention of innocent people's custody images (also known as mugshots) and police use of facial recognition technology. In 2018 they supported a debate in the House of Lords which noted the intrusive nature of this technology, the lack of a legal basis or parliamentary scrutiny, and the possibility that it may be incompatible with Article 8 right to privacy under the ECHR. In July 2018, the organisation brought a legal challenge against the Metropolitan Police Service and the Secretary of State for the Home Department.

In 2019, Big Brother Watch has also campaigned to protect victims of crime from 'digital strip searches' of their mobile phones by police, especially victims of sexual violence. They campaigned alongside other rights and justice groups including End Violence Against Women, Rape Crisis England and Wales and the Centre for Women's Justice.

In 2019, Big Brother Watch investigated and succeeded in getting HM Revenue and Customs (HMRC) to delete over 5 million people's voice biometrics, which had been collected without people's consent or knowledge, in breach of data protection laws, from a HMRC database. Big Brother Watch believed this to be the biggest ever deletion of biometric IDs from a British government database.

The organisation has published reports investigating police access to people's personal mobile phone information, police use of body worn cameras, surveillance technology in schools and the use of outdated communications laws to prosecute internet speech.

A 2011 BBW report into local authority data handling found that here had been more than 1000 incidents in which councils lost information about children and those in care.

== Board ==
- Paul Strasburger, Baron Strasburger
- Dinah Rose KC
- Mark Littlewood
- Al Ghaff
- Tim Knox
