= Clarifai =

American software company

Clarifai Inc.
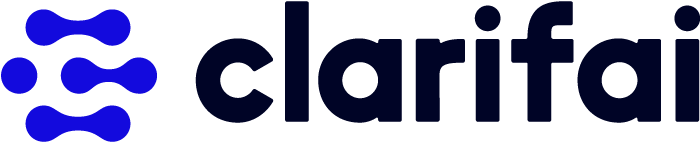
- Type: Private
- Industry: Computer Vision
- Founded: 2013 (New York City)
- Headquarters: Wilmington, DE, U.S.
- Area served: Worldwide
- Key people: Matthew Zeiler (Founder & CEO)
- Number of employees: 120+
- Website: clarifai.com

Clarifai Inc. is an artificial intelligence (AI) company that specializes in computer vision and uses machine learning and deep neural networks to identify and analyze images and videos.

Clarifai is headquartered in Wilmington, DE with satellite offices in San Francisco, Washington, D.C., New York City, Tallinn, Estonia, Canada and India.

== History ==
Clarifai was founded in 2013 by Matthew Zeiler, a Ph.D. student who recently placed in the top 5 spots of the 2013 ImageNet Challenge. Initially, the company offered free and paid versions of image and video recognition via their API and a consumer-facing iPhone app called Forevery. In 2014 Style Me Pretty, a wedding lifestyle website which used the technology to provide images that are personally adapted to the user, became Clarifai's first customer.

In 2016, Clarifai released version 2 of their API, adding custom training and visual search to its platform.

In 2017 the company moved all research work to a San Francisco office and all government-related endeavors to an office in Washington D.C. Later that year, the company announced a mobile SDK, which allowed users to run their platform without an internet connection. In 2018 Clarifai released an on-premise solution. In 2019, Clarifai opened a new office in Estonia's capital city Tallinn.

== Funding ==
In 2015, Clarifai raised $10 million in its Series A funding round, led by Union Square Ventures (USV). After the 2016 launch of their v2 API, Menlo Ventures led their $30 million Series B round, with participation from USV, Lux Capital, and Osage University Partners. In October 2021, Clarifai closed a $60 million Series C funding round led by New Enterprise Associates (NEA), with participation from existing investors Menlo Ventures, Union Square Ventures, Lux Capital, LDV Capital, Corazon Capital, NYU Innovation Venture Fund, and new investors CPP Investment Board, NextEquity Partners, SineWave Ventures, and Trousdale Capital. The amount raised brings the company's total funding to $100 million.

== Technology ==
The core of Clarifai's technology is based on convolutional neural networks, which Zeiler focused on for his PhD work. It is a process which enables a computer to learn from data examples and draw its own conclusions, giving applications the ability to predict correct tags for images or videos.

The platform includes the ability to moderate content, perform visual search, visual similarity, and organize media collections. It has pre-built recognition models that can identify a specific set of concepts like food or travel, NSFW, and its general model which can identify a range of concepts including objects, ideas, and emotion. It also has the ability to create custom models which can identify other arbitrary objects such as cars or breeds of dogs. The 2018 Model 1.5 with machine-labeled datasets claims to recognize up to 11,000 concepts from object detection, as well as things like mood or theme.

== Clients ==
In 2017, Clarifai had about 100 customers. Their technology was used by Unilever, Ubisoft, BuzzFeed, and also by companies producing medical devices and drones.

== Military work ==
In 2018 Zeiler disclosed that the company was a participant in Project Maven, a US Department of Defense AI program. The disclosure, in a blog post on the company website, came after a Wired story reported that a former employee had filed a wrongful termination suit. The suit alleged that she was dismissed for requesting that Clarifai disclose a 2017 server compromise to the Pentagon and other customers. Zeiler asserted (in a company blog, posted on June 13, 2018, in response to the server-breach controversy) that the breach involved only "an isolated research server", and that customers were notified following an external security audit. In late January, 2019, several Clarifai employees posted an open letter on a company message board expressing concerns that the June 13 blog-post of Zeiler’s contained implications of Clarifai’s complicit involvement with potentially unethical uses of AI technology, e.g. automated warfare. These allegations are part of the societal concern over the ethical development and use of AI, which has been growing alongside the pace of AI’s advancement.
