= Debbie Dooley =

American political activist

Debbie Dooley is a "prominent Georgia conservative activist" and one of the original founders of the Tea Party movement in the United States. She is known for her advocacy for rooftop solar power which she sees as an issue of personal power versus corporate energy monopolies.

== Early life and career ==
Dooley was one of the 22 organizers of the first nationwide Tea Party protest in 2009. She is a co-founder of the Atlanta Tea Party.

== Activism ==
=== Renewable energy ===
In 2012, Dooley became a strong advocate for rooftop solar power. She believes it could provide individuals with energy independence relative to monopolistic energy companies. She led a successful campaign in Georgia to require the state's utility commission to buy more energy from solar sources, despite opposition from fossil fuel backed conservative advocacy groups.

Dooley has partnered with ostensibly liberal environmental groups like the Sierra Club to form the Green Tea Coalition. Collectively they lobby for renewable energy despite being on opposite sides of the political spectrum. Dooley believes that to reach conservatives, you have to position renewable energy in line with conservative values, such as personal independence. If you align it with issues that conservatives react unfavorably to, such as global warming you will not succeed.

=== Use of public funds to support private enterprise ===
Dooley has also been critical of the use of public funds for private enterprise. She has led protests, for example, against the use of public funds to support the move of the Atlanta Braves to a new stadium in Cobb County, Georgia.

== Political candidates ==
Dooley has been a strong supporter of Donald Trump and feels that the Tea Party helped pave the way for his election to the US president in 2016. Nonetheless, she opposed Trump's import tariffs on solar modules enacted when he was president.

== Personal life ==
Dooley is the daughter of a Baptist Preacher.
