= Algorithmic Justice League =

Digital advocacy non-profit organization

- Abbreviation: AJL
- Formation: 2016
- Founder: Joy Buolamwini
- Purpose: AI activism
- Website: www.ajl.org

The Algorithmic Justice League (AJL) is a digital advocacy non-profit organization based in Cambridge, Massachusetts. Founded in 2016 by computer scientist Joy Buolamwini, the AJL combats the harms and biases of AI by amplifying the voices of communities most affected by AI systems and mobilizing advocates, researchers, and industry leaders to build more equitable and accountable algorithms. The AJL has engaged in a variety of open online seminars, media appearances, and tech advocacy initiatives to communicate information about bias in AI systems and promote industry and government action to mitigate against the creation and deployment of biased AI systems. Most notably, AJL has highlighted racial and gender biases in facial recognition technologies and has advocated for greater transparency and accountability in the datasets used to train these systems. In 2021, Fast Company named AJL as one of the 10 most innovative AI companies in the world.

== History ==
Buolamwini founded the Algorithmic Justice League in 2016 as a graduate student in the MIT Media Lab. While experimenting with facial detection software in her research, she found that the software could not detect her "highly melanated" face until she donned a white mask. After this incident, Buolamwini became inspired to found AJL to draw public attention to the existence of bias in artificial intelligence and the threat it can poses to civil rights. Early AJL campaigns focused primarily on bias in face recognition software; recent campaigns have dealt more broadly with questions of equitability and accountability in AI, including algorithmic bias, algorithmic decision-making, algorithmic governance, and algorithmic auditing.

Additionally there is a community of other organizations working towards similar goals, including Data and Society, Data for Black Lives, the Distributed Artificial Intelligence Research Institute (DAIR), and Fight for the Future.

== Notable work ==
=== Facial recognition ===
AJL founder Buolamwini collaborated with AI ethicist Timnit Gebru to release a 2018 study on racial and gender bias in facial recognition algorithms used by commercial systems from Microsoft, IBM, and Face++. Their research, entitled "Gender Shades", determined that machine learning models released by IBM and Microsoft were less accurate when analyzing dark-skinned and feminine faces compared to performance on light-skinned and masculine faces. The "Gender Shades" paper was accompanied by the launch of the Safe Face Pledge, an initiative designed with the Georgetown Center on Privacy & Technology that urged technology organizations and governments to prohibit lethal use of facial recognition technologies. The Gender Shades project and subsequent advocacy undertaken by AJL and similar groups led multiple tech companies, including Amazon and IBM, to address biases in the development of their algorithms and even temporarily ban the use of their products by police in 2020.

Buolamwini and AJL were featured in the 2020 Netflix documentary Coded Bias, which premiered at the Sundance Film Festival. This documentary focused on the AJL's research and advocacy efforts to spread awareness of algorithmic bias in facial recognition systems.

A research collaboration involving AJL released a white paper in May 2020 calling for the creation of a new United States federal government office to regulate the development and deployment of facial recognition technologies. The white paper proposed that creating a new federal government office for this area would help reduce the risks of mass surveillance and bias posed by facial recognition technologies towards vulnerable populations.

=== Bias in speech recognition ===
The AJL has run initiatives to increase public awareness of algorithmic bias and inequities in the performance of AI systems for speech and language modeling across gender and racial populations. The AJL's work in this space centers on highlighting gender and racial disparities in the performance of commercial speech recognition and natural language processing systems, which have been shown to underperform on racial minorities and reinforced gender stereotypes.

In March 2020, AJL released a spoken word artistic piece, titled Voicing Erasure, that increased public awareness of racial bias in automatic speech recognition (ASR) systems. The piece was performed by numerous female and non-binary researchers in the field, including Ruha Benjamin, Sasha Costanza-Chock, Safiya Noble, and Kimberlé Crenshaw. AJL based their development of "Voicing Erasure" on a 2020 PNAS paper, titled, "Racial disparities in automated speech recognition" that identified racial disparities in performance of five commercial ASR systems.

=== Algorithmic governance ===
In 2019, Buolamwini represented AJL at a congressional hearing of the US House Committee on Science, Space, and Technology, to discuss the applications of facial recognition technologies commercially and in the government. Buolamwini served as a witness at the hearing and spoke on underperformance of facial recognition technologies in identifying people with darker skin and feminine features and supported her position with research from the AJL project "Gender Shades".

In January 2022, the AJL collaborated with Fight for the Future and the Electronic Privacy Information Center to release an online petition called DumpID.me, calling for the IRS to halt their use of ID.me, a facial recognition technology they were using on users when they log in. The AJL and other organizations sent letters to legislators and requested them to encourage the IRS to stop the program. In February 2022, the IRS agreed to halt the program and stop using facial recognition technology. AJL has now shifted efforts to convince other government agencies to stop using facial recognition technology; as of March 2022, the DumpID.me petition has pivoted to stop the use of ID.me in all government agencies.

=== Olay Decode the Bias campaign ===
In September 2021, Olay collaborated with AJL and O'Neil Risk Consulting & Algorithmic Auditing (ORCAA) to conduct the Decode the Bias campaign, which included an audit that explored whether the Olay Skin Advisor (OSA) System included bias against women of color. The AJL chose to collaborate with Olay due to Olay's commitment to obtaining customer consent for their selfies and skin data to be used in this audit. The AJL and ORCAA audit revealed that the OSA system contained bias in its performance across participants' skin color and age. The OSA system demonstrated higher accuracy for participants with lighter skin tones, per the Fitzpatrick Skin Type and individual typology angle skin classification scales. The OSA system also demonstrated higher accuracy for participants aged 30–39. Olay has, since, taken steps to internally audit and mitigate against the bias of the OSA system. Olay has also funded 1,000 girls to attend the Black Girls Code camp, to encourage African-American girls to pursue STEM careers.

=== CRASH project ===
In July 2020, the Community Reporting of Algorithmic System Harms (CRASH) Project was launched by AJL. This project began in 2019 when Buolamwini and digital security researcher Camille François met at the Bellagio Center Residency Program, hosted by The Rockefeller Foundation. Since then, the project has also been co-led by MIT professor and AJL research director Sasha Costanza-Chock. The CRASH project focused on creating the framework for the development of bug-bounty programs (BBPs) that would incentivize individuals to uncover and report instances of algorithmic bias in AI technologies. After conducting interviews with BBP participants and a case study of Twitter's BBP program, AJL researchers developed and proposed a conceptual framework for designing BBP programs that compensate and encourage individuals to locate and disclose the existence of bias in AI systems. AJL intends for the CRASH framework to give individuals the ability to report algorithmic harms and stimulate change in AI technologies deployed by companies, especially individuals who have traditionally been excluded from the design of these AI technologies [20, DataSociety report].

=== Freedom Flyers Campaign ===
Beginning in 2023, the AJL launched the “Freedom Flyers” campaign, which raises awareness about the use of facial recognition by TSA at U.S. airports. As part of the campaign, the organization collects traveler experiences through a “TSA scorecard” to document how biometric systems are used at airport checkpoints . Its report ''Comply to Fly?'' found that many travelers perceive facial recognition screening as mandatory, despite official claims that it is voluntary.

The campaign also highlights that passengers can opt out of facial recognition without penalty and hosts events such as the Freedom Flyers Summit to discuss the broader implications of these technologies. It frames airport screening as a key site in the expansion of biometric surveillance and raises concerns about privacy, consent, and potential bias, particularly for marginalized groups.

== Support and media appearances ==
AJL initiatives have been funded by the Ford Foundation, the MacArthur Foundation, the Alfred P. Sloan Foundation, the Rockefeller Foundation, the Mozilla Foundation and individual private donors. Fast Company recognized AJL as one of the 10 most innovative AI companies in 2021. Additionally, venues such as Time magazine, The New York Times, NPR, and CNN have featured Buolamwini's work with the AJL in several interviews and articles.

== See also ==
- Regulation of algorithms
- Algorithmic transparency
- Digital rights
- Algorithmic bias
- Ethics of artificial intelligence
- Fairness (machine learning)
- Deborah Raji
- Emily M. Bender
- Joy Buolamwini
- Sasha Costanza-Chock
- Timnit Gebru
- Margaret Mitchell (scientist)
- Resisting AI
