= Data for Black Lives =

American non-profit, data science organization

- Nickname: D4BL
- Formation: November 2017
- Founder: Yeshimabeit Milner, Lucas Mason-Brown
- Headquarters: U.S.A
- Website: d4bl.org
- Formerly called: Data 4 Black Lives

Data for Black Lives (D4BL) is an American non-profit organization with the mission of using data science to create concrete and measurable change in the lives of black people. Headquartered in Cambridge, Massachusetts, Data for Black Lives was founded by Yeshimabeit Milner and Lucas Mason-Brown. Milner attended Brown University; having encountered discrimination towards the black community, she organized a group of scientists to combat the mistreatment of black people within data algorithms.

== History ==
D4BL began in November 2017 as statistical research project, and expanded into working with a team of people on data analysis. The formation of D4BL was initiated by Yeshimabeit Milner, who witnessed racial discrimination, watching her peers suffer from police brutality. Milner discovered through research that black children were getting suspended at a much higher rate than white children. After graduating from Brown University, Milner incorporated her passion for data science into social activism.

D4BL has regional organization chapters, including a group in Pittsburgh, Pennsylvania. Additionally there is a community of other organizations working towards the same goals, including Data and Society, Algorithmic Justice League, and the Distributed Artificial Intelligence Research Institute (DAIR).

Between 2019 and 2021, D4BL was awarded a grant by the MacArthur Foundation for broad operating support.

== See also ==
- Algorithmic Justice League
- Black in AI
