= Sasha Costanza-Chock =

American communications scholar

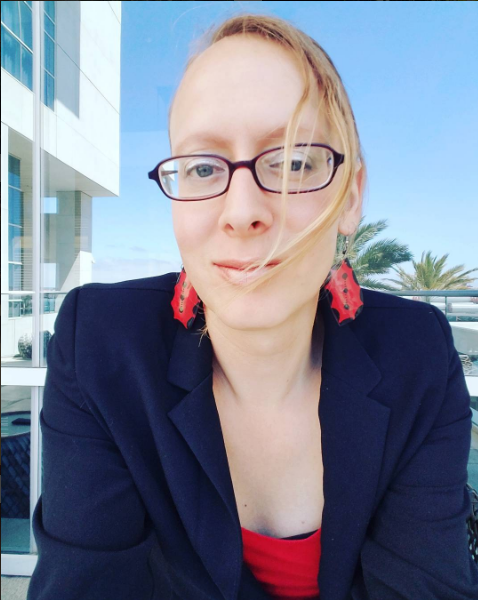
- Sasha Costanza-Chock at International Communications Association conference in 2017
- Title: Associate Professor

Academic background
- Education: Harvard University (BA); University of Pennsylvania (MA); University of Southern California (PhD)

Academic work
- Discipline: Media studies
- Institutions: Northeastern University
- Main interests: Media, design, social movements

Sasha Costanza-Chock is a U.S. communications scholar, author, and activist. They (Note: Costanza-Chock uses both she/her and they/them pronouns. This article uses singular they for consistency.) are a nonbinary trans femme. Sasha is the Head of Research at One Project and a faculty affiliate at the Berkman Klein Center for Internet & Society.

== Education and academic career ==
Costanza-Chock received their A.B. from Harvard University, M.A. from the University of Pennsylvania, and Ph.D. from the Annenberg School for Communication and Journalism at the University of Southern California. After receiving their Ph.D., Costanza-Chock took up a position at the Massachusetts Institute of Technology, where they were associate professor of Civic Media. They then became an associate professor at Northeastern University, before moving to their current position at One Project.

== Contributions ==
Costanza-Chock researches participatory design, social movements, media, and communications technologies, and has published work about design justice, Occupy Wall Street, the immigrant rights movement in the U.S., the Federal Communications Commission, the CRIS campaign for communication rights, and media policy, among other areas. As an activist they have contributed to citizen media projects such as VozMob, Transmission, and Indymedia.

Their first book Out of the Shadows, into the Streets! Transmedia Organizing and the Immigrant Rights Movement was published by The MIT Press in 2014. Writing about DREAM Act scholarship for The Journal of Higher Education, Michael Olivas called the book "a fascinating and liberating study of the social media used by various DREAMer factions". In a review in Information, Communication & Society Koen Leurs called the book "a reflective, situated, historically and contextually aware account of rights movements in the United States".

In 2018, their paper, Design Justice, A.I., and Escape from the Matrix of Domination won a $10,000 essay competition in the Journal of Design and Science. They expanded the paper into their second and most widely cited book, Design Justice: Community-Led Practices to Build the Worlds We Need, which was published in March 2020 by MIT Press. This book, described by the MIT Press as "An exploration of how design might be led by marginalized communities, dismantle structural inequality, and advance collective liberation and ecological survival," won the 2021 PROSE award from the American Association of University Publishers and has been cited more than 3,000 times.

Costanza-Chock is regularly quoted as an academic expert on media, technology, and activism, including the student response to the Stoneman Douglas High School shooting, movements to unionize tech workers, and the doxing of white supremacists.

== Other activities ==
Costanza-Chock was a co-founder of Research Action Design, a board member of Allied Media Projects, a co-founder of the Design Justice Network, and the Research Director of the Algorithmic Justice League.

== Honors and awards ==
- 2021 Engineering & Technology PROSE Award Finalist for their book Design Justice
- 2019 MIT John S.W. Kellett '47 Award, "for an exceptional and/or sustained commitment to creating a more welcoming environment at MIT" for LGBTQ+ individuals

== Bibliography ==
- Costanza-Chock, Sasha (2014). Out of the Shadows, into the Streets! Transmedia Organizing and the Immigrant Rights Movement. The MIT Press. ISBN 9780262028202.
- Costanza-Chock, Sasha (2020). Design Justice: Community-Led Practices to Build the Worlds We Need. MIT Press. ISBN 9780262043458.
