= Sarah T. Roberts =

Professor of Library & Information Science, author, and scholar

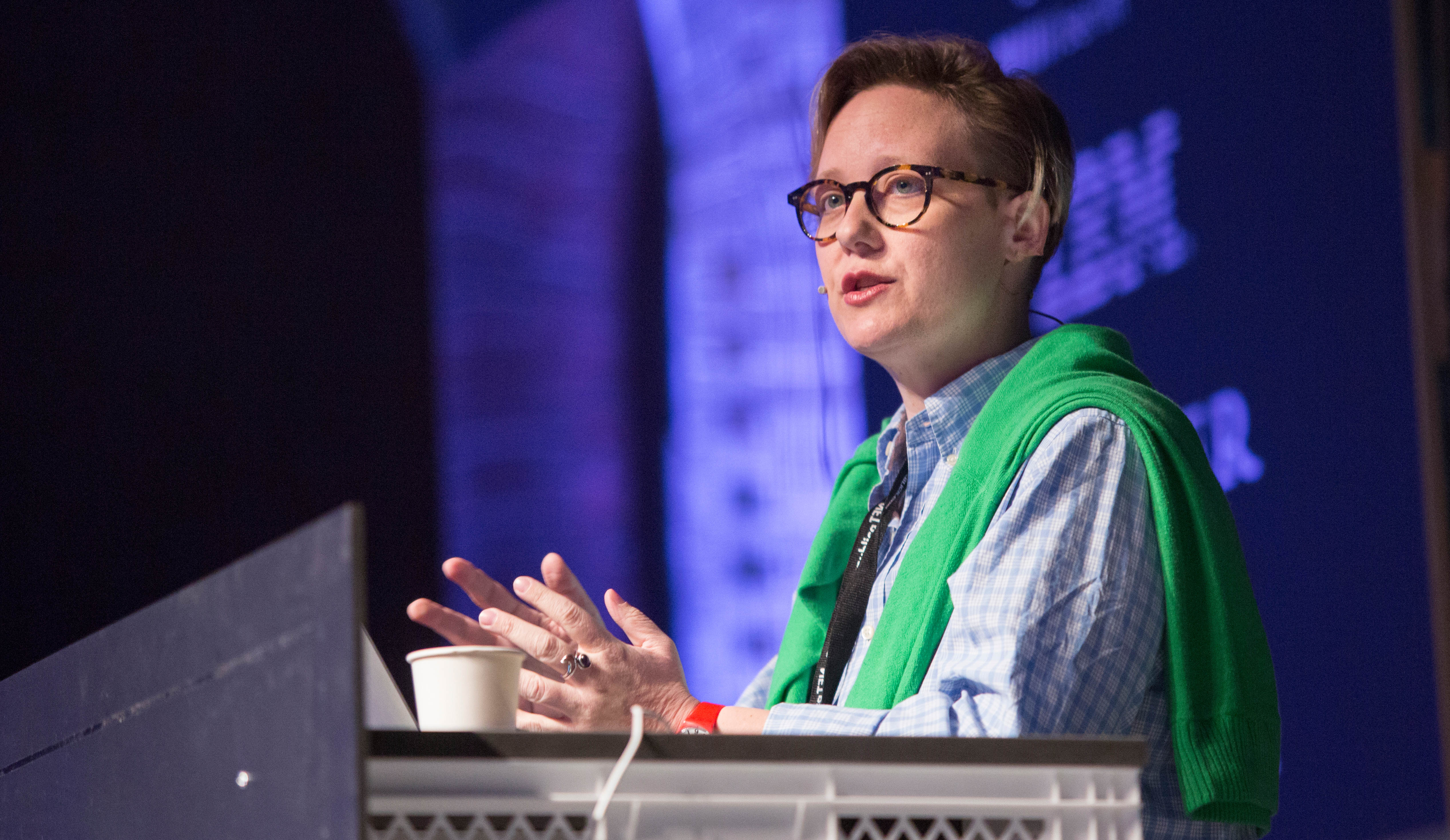
- Born: September 2, 1975 (age 51); Madison, Wisconsin U.S.
- Education: University of Wisconsin-Madison; University of Illinois at Urbana-Champaign
- Occupation: Professor
- Known for: Behind the Screen
- Website: illusionofvolition.com

Sarah T. Roberts (born September 2, 1975) is a professor, author, and scholar who specializes in content moderation of social media. She is an expert in the areas of internet culture, social media, digital labor, and the intersections of media and technology. She coined the term "commercial content moderation" (CCM) to describe the job paid content moderators do to regulate legal guidelines and standards. Roberts wrote the book Behind the Screen: Content Moderation in the Shadows of Social Media.

== Early life and education ==
Roberts grew up in Madison, Wisconsin and attended Madison West High School.

In 1997, Roberts received a B.A. from the University of Wisconsin-Madison, where she double-majored in French and Spanish language and literature. She also earned a certificate of Women's Studies. In 2007, Roberts received an M.A. in Library and Information Science from the University of Wisconsin-Madison's iSchool. In 2014, Roberts earned a PhD in Library and Information Science from the University of Illinois at Urbana–Champaign. Her dissertation, directed by Linda C. Smith, was titled Behind the Screen: The Hidden Digital Labor of Commercial Content Moderation.

== Career ==
From 2013 to 2016, Roberts was an assistant professor at the University of Western Ontario's Faculty of Information & Media Studies.

In 2016, Roberts became an assistant professor at University of California, Los Angeles's Graduate School of Education and Information Studies. She was awarded tenure and promoted to Associate Professor in 2020.

Roberts' research focuses on commercial content moderation (CCM), the information work and workers, and on the social, economic, and political impact of the widespread adoption of the internet in everyday life. Her work has raised public awareness around issues of social media platform moderation. Roberts' research has been featured in various media outlets including Wired, The New Yorker, The Guardian, The New York Times, among others.

As part of her work, Roberts consulted on the 2018 documentary The Cleaners, which focused on content moderators and the challenges they face.

In 2019, Roberts' book Behind the Screen: Content Moderation in the Shadows of Social Media was published by Yale University Press. It is the first book-length ethnographic study of the work commercial content moderators. The book received positive reviews by publications including the Los Angeles Review of Books.

Along with longtime collaborator Safiya Noble, Roberts is co-director of the Center for Critical Internet Inquiry (C2i2) at UCLA. In 2019, Roberts was awarded an NSF grant to further her research on CCM.

== Awards ==
- 2009: Google, Google Policy Fellowship at American Library Association in Washington, D.C.
- 2018: Electronic Frontier Foundation, EFF Pioneer Award: Groundbreaking Content Moderation Researcher
- 2018: Carnegie Fellow

== Select works and publications ==
=== Selected works ===
- Roberts, Sarah T. (2014). Behind the Screen: The Hidden Digital Labor of Commercial Content Moderation (PDF) (Doctor of Philosophy in Library and Information Science). Graduate College of the University of Illinois at Urbana-Champaign. OCLC 932133294. hdl:2142/50401
- Noble, Safiya Umoja; Roberts, Sarah T. (2016). "Chapter 9 - Through Google-Colored Glass(es): Design, Emotion, Class, and Wearables as Commodity and Control". In Tettegah, Sharon Y.; Noble, Safiya Umoja (eds.). Emotions, Technology, and Design. London: Academic Press. pp. 187–212. doi:10.1016/B978-0-12-801872-9.00009-0. ISBN 978-0-12-801872-9. OCLC 933581174.
- Roberts, S.T. (2016). "In/visibility". In Letters & Handshakes (ed.). Surplus3: Labour and the Digital. Toronto: Letters & Handshakes.
- Roberts, Sarah T. (2016). "Commercial Content Moderation: Digital Laborers' Dirty Work". In Noble, Safiya Umoja; Tynes, Brendesha M (eds.). The Intersectional Internet: Race, Sex, Class and Culture Online. New York: Peter Lang Publishing. pp. 147–159. ISBN 978-1-433-13001-4. OCLC 973733465.
- Roberts, Sarah T. (2016). "Aggregating the unseen". In Byström, Arvida; Soda, Molly; Kraus, Chris (eds.). Pics or It Didn't Happen: Images Banned from Instagram. Munich: Prestel Verlag. pp. 17–21. ISBN 978-3-791-38307-1. OCLC 987198486.
- Roberts, Sarah T. (2019). Behind the Screen: Content Moderation in the Shadows of Social Media. New Haven: Yale University Press. ISBN 978-0-300-24531-8. OCLC 1103320164.

=== Selected publications ===
- Roberts, Sarah T.; Noble, Safiya Umoja (Winter 2016). "Empowered to Name, Inspired to Act: Social Responsibility and Diversity as Calls to Action in the LIS Context". Library Trends. 64 (3). Johns Hopkins University Press: 512–532. doi:10.1353/lib.2016.0008. hdl:2142/89857. S2CID 145540483.
- Roberts, Sarah T. (1 February 2016). "Digital Refuse: Canadian Garbage, Commercial Content Moderation and the Global Circulation of Social Media's Waste". Wi: Journal of Mobile Media. 10 (1): 1–18.
- Noble, Safiya U.; Roberts, Sarah T. (12 November 2016). "Targeting race in ads is nothing new, but the stakes are high". USA TODAY.
- Roberts, Sarah T. (8 March 2017). "Social Media's Silent Filter". The Atlantic.
- Noble, Safiya U.; Roberts, Sarah T. (13 March 2017). "Out of the Black Box" (PDF). EDUCAUSE Review.
- Roberts, Sarah T. (2018). "Digital detritus: 'Error' and the logic of opacity in social media content moderation". First Monday. 23 (3).
- Roberts, Sarah T. (15 June 2018). "Opinion: Meet the people who scar themselves to clean up our social media networks". Maclean's.
- Roberts, Sarah T. (8 April 2020). "Fewer Humans Are Moderating Facebook Content. That's Worrying". Slate Magazine.

== Films ==
=== Documentary ===
- Backlash: Misogyny in the Digital Age. Canada. 2022. La Ruelle Films. Dir. Léa Clermont-Dion, Guylaine Maroist. [Je vous salue salope: la misogynie au temps du numérique] (French version).
