= Robert Epstein =

American psychologist and journalist (born 1953)

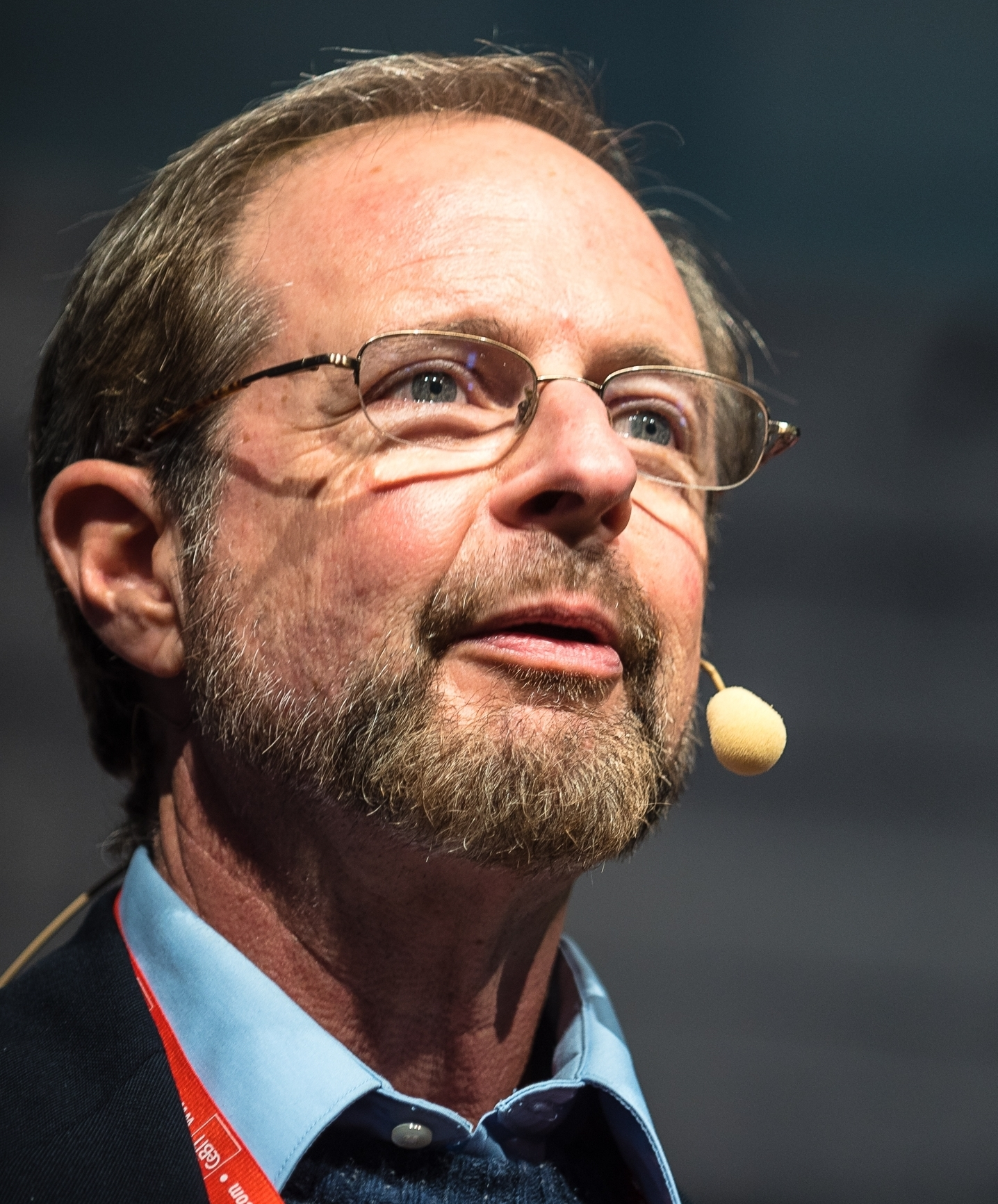
- Epstein speaking at the ceBIT conference in Hanover, Germany
- Born: June 19, 1953 (age 73); Hartford, Connecticut, U.S.
- Education: Trinity College (BA); University of Maryland, Baltimore; Harvard University (PhD)
- Known for: Generativity Theory; Love Contract; Search engine manipulation effect Sexual Continuum Theory
- Scientific career
- Fields: Psychology; Behavioural sciences
- Workplaces: Boston University; Harvard University; University of the South Pacific; University of California, San Diego; San Diego State University
- Thesis: Columban stimulations of complex human behavior (1981)

Robert Epstein (born June 19, 1953) is an American psychologist and behavioral scientist. He was awarded a Ph.D. in psychology by Harvard University in 1981, was editor-in-chief of Psychology Today, and has held positions at several universities including Boston University, University of California, San Diego, and Harvard. He is also the founder and director emeritus of the Cambridge Center for Behavioral Studies in Concord, Massachusetts. In 2012, he founded the American Institute for Behavioral Research and Technology (AIBRT), a nonprofit organization that conducts research to promote the well-being and functioning of people worldwide.

Epstein has been a commentator for National Public Radio's Marketplace, the Voice of America, and Disney Online. His popular writings have appeared in Reader's Digest, The Washington Post, The Sunday Times (London), Good Housekeeping, The New York Times, Parenting, and other magazines and newspapers. Epstein is a public figure in the world of psychology. He has published more than 350 articles and 15 books. His online competency tests are taken by more than a million people a year.

== Early life ==
Epstein was born on June 19, 1953, in Hartford, Connecticut, into a Jewish family. He went to Conard High School in West Hartford where he was first introduced to computer programming and hacking through the school's IBM 1620, one of the first computers owned by a US High School.

Epstein went to Trinity College in Hartford, Connecticut, where he majored in Psychology and also took classes in dance. After receiving his B.A., Epstein moved to Israel to pursue his 'calling' to become a rabbi, where he worked on a kibbutz and studied at a yeshiva. After six months, he decided to instead turn his attention back to psychology, after becoming enamored with the works of B. F. Skinner.

== Graduate work ==
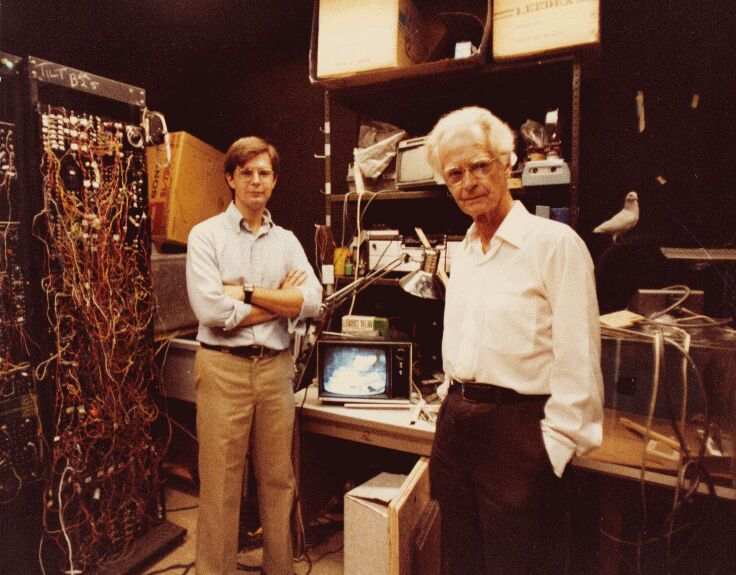
B. F. Skinner and Epstein photographed in the Harvard Pigeon Laboratory in the 1980s

In 1976, Epstein enrolled in the master's program in community and clinical psychology at the University of Maryland, Baltimore County. There he studied the experimental analysis of behavior under A. Charles Catania. While at graduate school, Epstein personally reached out to the then-retired B.F. Skinner, and convinced him to begin pigeon research again at the Psychology Department at Harvard University. Epstein and Skinner began collaborating on several new research projects, and in the summer of 1977 Epstein was invited to become a full-time graduate student at Harvard. In 1981, he earned a PhD in Experimental Psychology from Harvard without having to write a dissertation, owing to the number of publications he had.

== Career ==
After receiving his PhD, Epstein founded the Cambridge Center for Behavioral Studies in 1981. For nine years, he served as the center's executive director while conducting research and teaching at the University of Massachusetts Boston, Northeastern University, Simmons College (Massachusetts), the University of Massachusetts Amherst, and Boston University.

After leaving the Cambridge Center for Behavioral Studies in 1990, he began to write for national magazines, such as Reader's Digest and Psychology Today, and he also began to talk about psychological research in segments of Voice of America and National Public Radio. From 1998 to 2001 he hosted the national radio show Psychology Today Live.

During this time, he also held visiting posts at Keio University, Tokyo, and the HAL College of Technology and Design, at their Osaka, Nagoya, and Tokyo campuses in Japan. For six years, he was also a researcher and Associate Investigator at the Center for Behavioral Epidemiology, Graduate School of Public Health, San Diego State University.

Epstein also served as Professor of Psychology and Chair of the Department of Psychology at National University (California). From 1990 to 1995, he directed the Loebner Prize Competition in Artificial Intelligence, an annual contest in which human intelligence is pitted against machine intelligence.

In 1999, he became the editor-in-chief of Psychology Today magazine, a position he held until 2003. He then hosted the SiriusXM radio show Psyched! and contributed to media outlets such as Scientific American and Huffington Post. During this time, he was also a Research Professor at Alliant International University and was a visiting scholar at the University of California San Diego. In 2013, he moved to the Fiji Islands to serve as the first full Professor of Psychology at the University of the South Pacific, a position he held until 2015.

An autobiographical essay documenting his long involvement with the media was published in 2006 in the academic journal Perspectives on Psychological Science.

In 2012, he co-founded the American Institute for Behavioral Research and Technology (AIBRT) in Vista, California, where he is currently Senior Research Psychologist.

== Contributions to behavioral science ==
=== Generativity Theory ===
While at Harvard in the 1980s, Epstein introduced the idea of "Generativity Theory", a quantitative, predictive theory of creativity in both animals and people, derived from research he had conducted with pigeons, children, and adults. His 2000 book, The Big Book of Creativity Games, includes exercises for increasing creativity.

=== Vulnerability Theory of Emotional Bonding (VTEB) ===
In various writings, Epstein has been a strong advocate of the view that people can deliberately learn to love each other, and he has proposed a formal, predictive theory of how love grows in couples. His theory is based in part on research he has conducted on how love arises in arranged marriages in multiple cultures worldwide. In 2013, he published a study summarizing this research. At a class on intimate relationships he taught at University of California, San Diego, he gave extra credit to students for taking part in affection building exercises, and that class attracted national news coverage. At one time, he used himself as an experimental subject to investigate this proposition, and he proposed that couples take control over their love lives by signing a Love Contract.

=== Sexual continuum ===
Epstein has conducted large-scale studies on sexual orientation that argue in favor of assertions made by Sigmund Freud, Alfred Kinsey, and others that (a) sexual orientation lies on a continuum, (b) bisexuality is the natural norm for human beings, and (c) most people claim to be straight because of social pressure. His psychometric test on sexual orientation is available in multiple languages online.

=== Adolescence ===
Epstein is also a scholar in the field of psychological maturity, and has published an online maturity test. He is critical of what he sees as the "artificial extension of childhood" over the past century, arguing that what society views as the "teen brain" is often the result of Western cultural factors and infantilization, rather than a set of brain characteristics that are inherent in all humans throughout their teen years. In certain essays, he has cited studies which found that some teenagers are in some ways more developmentally mature than most adults, and advocates giving young people more adult responsibility, as well as placing them in environments in which they will not be prone to socializing simply with other teenagers. He is the co-founder of National Youth Rights Day and is the author of The Case Against Adolescence, which was cited by the US Supreme Court in the 2010 case Graham v. Florida.

=== Carrier Separation Plan ===
At the start of the COVID-19 pandemic, Epstein developed a plan for quickly stopping the transmission of the virus, eradicating it from the population, and reopening the economy without the need for social distancing or a vaccine, named the Carrier Separation Plan (CSP). It was based on a mathematical model he developed, and was accepted for publication by Frontiers in Public Health. The model called for a three-stage approach, "(a) nearly simultaneous self-testing for the pathogen by an entire population, followed rapidly by (b) nearly simultaneous self-isolation of carriers, and (c) secondary screening at entrances to facilities where people congregate". Evidence collated in the paper suggested that the implementation of CSP would dramatically slow the spread of the virus even if compliance with the plan was only moderate. Epstein called on both the Trump and Biden Administrations to implement the plan in the face of emerging variants.

=== Psychometric tests ===
Since the 1990s, Epstein has developed a number of psychological tests that people can take online without charge. Some measure competencies in areas such as creativity, love, stress management, and parenting. He has also developed a mental health screening test that is consistent with the DSM-5. Many of the tests are available in foreign translations.

== Contributions to internet studies ==
=== Search Engine Manipulation Effect (SEME) ===
In 2013, Epstein discovered a phenomenon he termed the Search Engine Manipulation Effect (SEME), an internet-influence effect that could give a dominant search engine company the power to determine the outcome of close elections. He presented his theory in seminars at Stanford University, the National Academies of Sciences, Engineering, and Medicine, and the International Convention of Psychological Science in Vienna, Austria. He published these findings in the peer-reviewed scientific journal Proceedings of the National Academy of Sciences, and continues to research this phenomenon. His research led to him being invited to testify before the United States Senate Judiciary Subcommittee on the Constitution, hearing on Google and Censorship, in June 2019.

=== Search Suggestion Effect (SSE) ===
In experiments begun in 2016, Epstein determined that search suggestions—and the suppression of negative search suggestions—can also be used to manipulate votes and opinions, a phenomenon he termed the Search Suggestion Effect (SSE). He has expressed concern that this effect could be used by Big Tech companies to influence peoples' opinions with impunity. He described this theory in detail during a 2017 seminar at the Stanford School of Engineering.

=== Criticism of Google ===
Epstein has been an outspoken critic of Google and has proposed methods for reducing the threat that Big Tech poses to free-and-fair elections. In 2012, he said that Google could rig the 2016 United States presidential election and that search engine manipulation was "a serious threat to the democratic system of government". In 2016, he wrote in Huffington Post magazine that Google had "a fundamentally deceptive business model". In a 2017 article, Epstein criticized efforts by companies such as Google and Facebook to suppress fake news through algorithms, noting "the dangers in allowing big technology companies to decide which news stories are legitimate". In 2019, Epstein compiled data that showed Google suggesting more positive terms when users searched for Hillary Clinton compared to when searching for Donald Trump.

Other journalists and researchers have expressed concerns similar to Epstein's. Safiya Noble cited Epstein's research about search engine bias in her 2018 book Algorithms of Oppression, although she has expressed doubt that search engines ought to counter-balance the content of large, well-resourced and highly trained newsrooms with what she called "disinformation sites" and "propaganda outlets". Ramesh Srinivasan, a professor of information studies at UCLA focusing on "the relationships between technology and politics", agreed with Epstein that "the larger issue" of how search engines can shape users' views is "extremely important", but questioned how many undecided voters are using Google to help them decide whom to vote for.

Some of his ideas have been criticized. Google dismissed Epstein's research as "nothing more than a poorly constructed conspiracy theory". Panagiotis Metaxas, a Wellesley College computer science professor, said Epstein's paper on the search engine manipulation effect demonstrated a possibility of "what such an influence could have been if Google was manipulating its electoral search results", adding "I and other researchers who have been auditing search results for years know that this did not happen." The Los Angeles Times reported in March 2019 that Epstein's criticism of Google had been "warmly embraced" by some conservatives, a phenomenon that Epstein said "is driving me crazy".

== Personal life ==
Epstein has five children and lives in Vista, California. His wife Misti was killed in a car accident in 2019, shortly after Epstein testified before Congress regarding Google Search, ending a marriage that began in 2012.

== Books ==
- Notebooks: B. F. Skinner (editor) (1980), ISBN 0-13-624106-9
- Skinner for the Classroom: Selected Papers (editor) (1982), ISBN 0-87822-261-8
- Cognition, Creativity, and Behavior: Selected Essays (1996), ISBN 0-275-94452-2
- Creativity Games for Trainers (1996), ISBN 0-07-021363-1
- Pure Fitness: Body Meets Mind (with Lori Fetrick) (1996), ISBN 1-57028-087-8
- Self-Help Without the Hype (1996), ISBN 0-937100-00-5
- Irrelativity (1997), ISBN 1-884470-13-0
- The New Psychology Today Reader (1999), ISBN 0-7872-5617-X
- Stress-Management and Relaxation Activities for Trainers (1999), ISBN 0-07-021762-9
- The Big Book of Creativity Games (2000), ISBN 0-07-136176-6
- The Big Book of Stress-Relief Games (2000), ISBN 0-07-021866-8
- The Big Book of Motivation Games (with Jessica Rogers) (2001), ISBN 0-07-137234-2
- The Case Against Adolescence: Rediscovering the Adult in Every Teen (2007), ISBN 0-7879-8737-9
- Parsing the Turing Test: Philosophical and Methodological Issues in the Quest for the Thinking Computer (co-editor) (2008), ISBN 978-1-4020-6708-2
- Teen 2.0: Saving Our Children and Families from the Torment of Adolescence (2010), ISBN 1-884995-59-4

=== Films ===
- The Creepy Line (2018)
