= Laura Boldrini =

Italian politician

Laura Boldrini OMRI
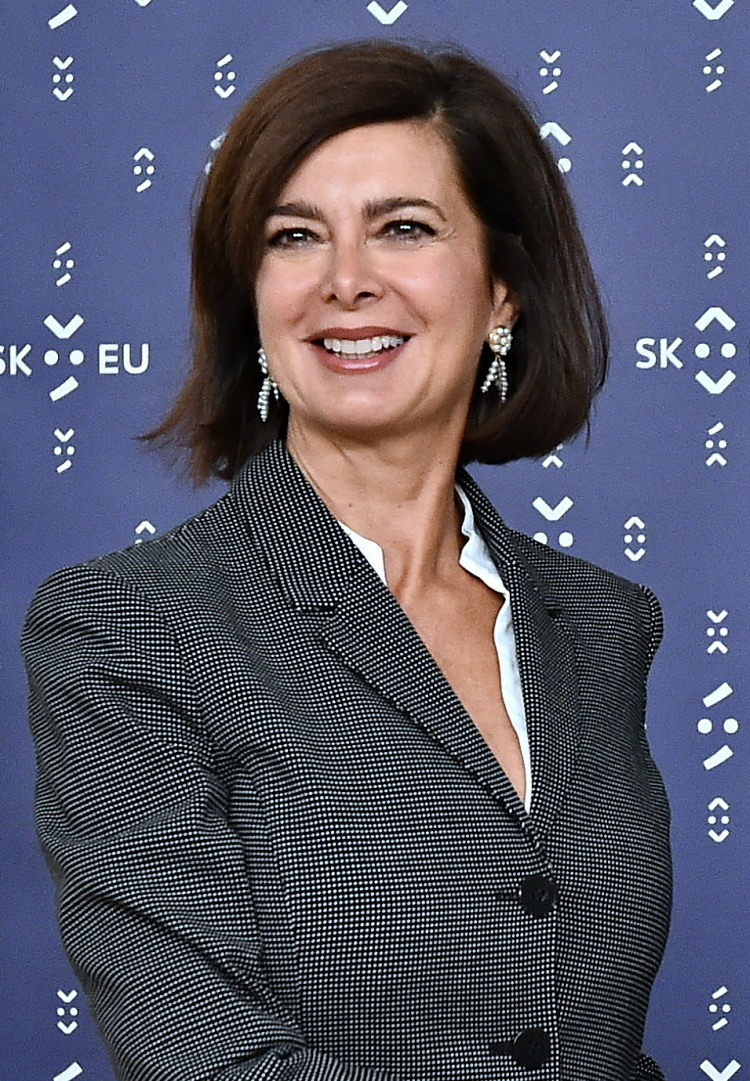

President of the Chamber of Deputies
- In office 16 March 2013 – 22 March 2018
- Preceded by: Gianfranco Fini
- Succeeded by: Roberto Fico

Member of the Chamber of Deputies
- Incumbent
- Assumed office 15 March 2013
- Constituency: Sicily 2 (2013–2018); Lombardy 1 (2018–2022); Tuscany (2022–present)

Personal details
- Born: 28 April 1961 (age 65) Macerata, Italy
- Party: SEL (2013–2016); SI (2016–2017); Independent (2017–2018); Futura (2018–2019); PD (since 2019)
- Education: Sapienza University of Rome
- Profession: Journalist

Laura Boldrini, OMRI (Italian pronunciation: [ˈlaura bolˈdriːni]; born 28 April 1961) is an Italian politician and former United Nations official, who served as President of the Chamber of Deputies of Italy. Previously she served as Spokesperson for the United Nations High Commissioner for Refugees (UNHCR) for Southern Europe.

== Biography ==
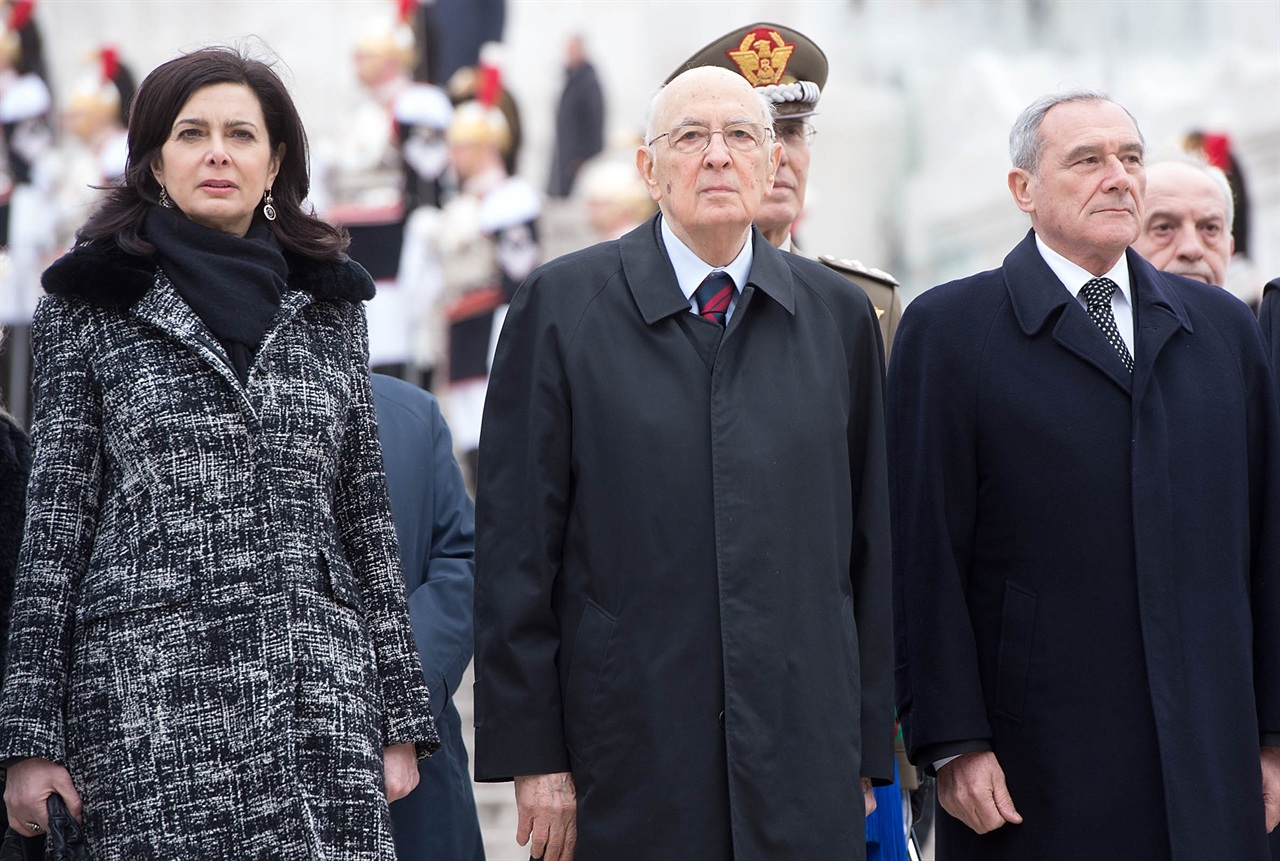
Laura Boldrini with Giorgio Napolitano and Pietro Grasso

Born in Macerata, Marche, Boldrini graduated in law from the Sapienza University of Rome in 1985. Afterwards, she was employed at the Italian public service broadcasting corporation RAI, working both for television and radio. In 1989 she was employed for four years at the Food and Agriculture Organization of the United Nations (FAO), where she was active in video and radio production.

From 1993 until 1998 she worked at the World Food Programme (WFP) as the Italian spokesperson. From 1998 to 2012 she was spokesperson of the High Commissioner for Refugees (UNHCR), for whom she also coordinated public information campaigns in Southern Europe. In recent years she has specifically dealt with the influx of migrants and refugees in the Mediterranean. She has taken part in numerous missions to crisis spots, including the former Yugoslavia, Afghanistan, Pakistan, Iraq, Iran, Sudan, Caucasus, Angola and Rwanda.

=== Political career ===
Boldrini was elected to the Italian Chamber of Deputies in the 2013 parliamentary election as an independent candidate in the Left Ecology Freedom party list, who together with their coalition allies in the Democratic Party and in Italy Common Good held the majority of seats in the lower house. She represents the second electoral district of Sicily.

On 16 March 2013, following a meeting between the Democratic Party and Left Ecology Freedom, Boldrini was proposed by the coalition Italy Common Good as candidate for the Presidency of the Chamber of Deputies. She was elected President of the Chamber of Deputies on the same day, receiving 327 votes out of a possible 618. She is the third woman, after Nilde Iotti (1979 to 1992) and Irene Pivetti (1994–1996), to fill this role.

Boldrini has criticised "fake news", believing it to lead to forms of hate speech. She has proposed that Facebook be more active in regulating these forms of postings. She has been threatened online and in real life for her role in supporting immigrants' and women's rights.

In December 2020, Boldrini announced she was suing Lega Nord leader Matteo Salvini for allegedly saying that she supports ethnic replacement of Europeans, and for calling immigrant criminals "Boldrini's resources", based on a speech in which she called immigrants resources. A separate case against the Libero newspaper was dismissed in February 2022, for the 2018 headline "Desirée Mariottini, Laura Boldrini: her 'resources' rape and kill, but she goes on the attack against Salvini". The judge ruled that it was protected criticism of Boldrini's public and long-held pro-immigration views, and had not attributed blame to her.

== Honours and decorations ==
=== National Honors ===
- Italy : Knight of the Order of Merit of the Italian Republic on 26 February 2004
- Italy, Montecassiano (MC) : Primadonna 2008
- Italy: Renato Benedetto Fabrizi 2011

=== Foreign Honors ===
- Albania : Honorary Citizen of the City of Kukës
- Order of Skanderbeg (Albania, 13 October 2016) – decorated by President of Albania Bujar Nishani

== Writings ==
=== Books ===
- Tutti indietro (in Italian). Milano: Rizzoli. 2010. p. 216. ISBN 978-88-17-03990-1. BUR edition: 2013. ISBN 978-88-586-4488-1.
- Solo le montagne non si incontrano mai. Storia di Murayo e dei suoi due padri (in Italian). Milano: Rizzoli. 2013. p. 162. ISBN 978-88-586-4347-1.

== Films ==
=== Documentary ===
- Backlash: Misogyny in the Digital Age. Canada. 2022. La Ruelle Films. Dir. Léa Clermont-Dion, Guylaine Maroist. Je vous salue salope: la misogynie au temps du numérique] (French version).

Political offices
Preceded by Gianfranco Fini	President of the Italian Chamber of Deputies; 2013–2018	Succeeded by Roberto Fico
