= Backlash: Misogyny in the Digital Age =

- Directed by: Léa Clermont-Dion; Guylaine Maroist
- Written by: Léa Clermont-Dion; Guylaine Maroist
- Produced by: La Ruelle Films
- Starring: Laura Boldrini; Marion Séclin; Kiah Morris; Donna Zuckerberg; Sarah T. Roberts
- Production company: La Ruelle Films
- Distributed by: La Ruelle Films
- Release date: September 9, 2022
- Country: Canada
- Languages: French, English

Backlash: Misogyny in the Digital Age (French: Je vous salue salope : la mysogynie au temps du numérique) is a Canadian documentary feature film by Léa Clermont-Dion and Guylaine Maroist released in 2022. It is produced and distributed by La Ruelle Films.

== Synopsis ==
The film exposes the many consequences of online misogyny. It sheds lights on hatred towards women. This Canadian documentary feature by Clermont-Dion and Maroist, succeeds on being suspenseful while it follows four women across two different continents: Laura Boldrini, former President of the Italian Chamber of Deputies; Kiah Morris, former Democratic representative; French actor and YouTuber Marion Séclin; and Laurence Gratton, a school teacher from Montréal.

Experts in the field also testify: Donna Zuckerberg, specialist in cyber-violence against women and sister of the founder of Facebook, Laurence Rosier, professor of linguistics at the Université Libre de Bruxelles and Sarah T. Roberts, author, researcher and professor at the prestigious University of California in Los Angeles.

This feature-length documentary looks at the impact and scourge of cyber-violence and digital misogyny by following victims up close and personal in their daily lives.

The National Post gave it a 5-star rating and Le Soleil gave it a 4-star rating.

== Cast ==
- Laura Boldrini
- Marion Séclin
- Kiah Morris (or Ruqaiyah Khadijah Kiah Morris)
- Laurence Gratton
- Glen Canning
- Laurence Rosier
- Donna Zuckerberg
- Nadia Seraiocco
- Sarah T. Roberts

== Awards ==
It was a Prix Iris nominee for Best Documentary Film at the 25th Quebec Cinema Awards in 2023.
