= Kiah Morris =

American politician

Member of the Vermont House of Representatives from the Bennington 2-2 district
- In office January 7, 2015 – September 25, 2018
- Preceded by: Anne Lamy Mook
- Succeeded by: Jim Carroll

Personal details
- Born: Ruqaiyah Khadijah Morris; March 14, 1976 (age 50) Chicago, Illinois, U.S.
- Party: Democratic
- Spouse: James Lawton
- Education: University of Illinois at Urbana–Champaign (BA)

Ruqaiyah Khadijah "Kiah" Morris (born March 14, 1976) is an American politician who formerly served as a member of the Vermont House of Representatives for the Democratic Party.

== Early life and education ==
Born in Chicago, Morris earned a B.A. in Gender Studies from the University of Illinois, Urbana-Champaign and a graduate degree from Roosevelt University.

== Political career ==
Morris was first elected in 2014 alongside longtime Republican representative Mary A. Morrissey. The two were reelected in 2016 after running unopposed. The only African American woman in the state legislature, Morris announced in August 2018 that she would not seek reelection to a third term following a campaign of racist threats against her and her family. She resigned the following month, citing as an additional factor the desire to focus on her husband's recovery from open-heart surgery.

Morris has also served as director of the Alliance for Community Transformations, based in Bennington.

== Electoral history ==
Date	Election	Candidate	Party	Votes	%
Vermont House of Representatives, Bennington 2-2 district
Nov 4, 2014	General	Mary A. Morrissey	Republican	1,241	42.49
Nov 4, 2014	General	Kiah Morris	Democratic	873	29.89
Nov 4, 2014	General	Joann Erenhouse	Democratic	797	27.29
Nov 4, 2014	General	Write-Ins		10	0.33
Nov 4, 2014	General	Anne Lamy Mook did not seek reelection; seat stayed Democratic			
Nov 8, 2016	General	Mary A. Morrissey	Republican	2,143	54.61
Nov 8, 2016	General	Kiah Morris	Democratic	1,757	44.78
Nov 8, 2016	General	Write-Ins		24	0.61

== Personal life ==
Morris is married to James Lawton. They have a son.

== Films ==
=== Documentary ===
- Backlash: Misogyny in the Digital Age. Canada. 2022. La Ruelle Films. Dir. Léa Clermont-Dion, Guylaine Maroist. [Je vous salue salope: la misogynie au temps du numérique] (French version).
