= Guylaine Maroist =

Canadian journalist and filmmaker

- Citizenship: Canadian
- Occupation(s): Producer, Director, Screenwriter
- Organization: La Ruelle Films
- Notable work: Backlash: Misogyny in the Digital Age
- Website: laruellefilms.com

Guylaine Maroist is a Canadian journalist and filmmaker. She founded La Ruelle Films with Eric Ruel. She is well known for her documentary productions such as Gentilly or Not To Be, Time Bombs, Disunited States of Canada, God Save Justin Trudeau, Jukebox and Backlash: Misogyny in the Digital Age. In 2011, she received the Governor General's History Award for Popular History (The Pierre Berton Award) for her TV documentary series J’ai la mémoire qui tourne (My Memories On a Roll). She is President of Productions de la Ruelle, a documentary film production company in Montreal, and President of Les Artistes pour la Paix, a Quebec NGO advocating peace and nuclear disarmament. Her most recent film Backlash: Misogyny in the Digital Age [Je vous salue salope : la misogynie au temps du numérique], which she co-directed with Léa Clermont-Dion, is about cyberviolence against women.

== Biography ==
Guylaine Maroist has a DEC degree in Communications from College Jean-de-Brébeuf, a BAC in Arts from Université de Montreal, and a Certificate in Law from Université de Montreal. After graduation, Maroist worked as a music columnist for Le Devoir from 1992 to 1995, specializing in modern music. During that period, she also wrote for various magazines like The Artist (which she was the editor of in 1993) and Vamp. She freelanced for La Presse and Journal de Montreal on various topics.

In 1994, Maroist started working in the music industry and became interested in Quebec's musical heritage. She and Denis Pantis of Discs Merit, Quebec's musical heritage archivist, created a catalog of Quebec music records by the reissue of a hundred albums of major Quebec stars from 1950 to 1980.

In 1999-2001, Maroist led a project to create a series of biographies of prolific Quebec artists. For 70 musicographies in the creation of which she participated as researcher and director, she took nearly 2000 interview.

== La Ruelle Films (previously Productions de la ruelle) ==
In 2002, Maroist founded, with Éric Ruel, Les Productions de la Ruelle (now La Ruelle Films), a company specializing in the production of TV series and documentary films. In 2005, they produced a documentary titled Time Bombs, which won the Gold Ribbon Award from the Canadian Association of Broadcasters for the best documentary of the year, and the Grand Jury Prize for Best Documentary at the Independent Film Festival of New York. The film was about Canadian soldiers sent in 1957 to the US to participate in military exercises involving the use of nuclear weapons. The soldiers were exposed to prohibitive doses of radiation without being told about the effect, and for decades afterwards. It relied on the footage obtained from US Army archives, as well as on testimonies of the surviving Canadian veterans.

In 2012, Maroist produced the documentary Gentilly or Not To Be, focused on the problems with the refurbishment of the Gentilly-2 nuclear power plant in Quebec. The documentary raised questions about the safety of the plant, its nuclear waste and, in particular, the potential negative impact on the health of citizens of the region, asking whether it was better to go ahead with the refurbishment of Gentilly-2, or to turn to alternative energy sources. Also in 2012, Les Productions de la Ruelle released The Disunited States of Canada – a documentary exploring the issue of separatism in Canada outside of Quebec. In 2013, these two documentaries won three Gemini Awards.

In 2009-10, Maroist and Eric Ruel accomplished a major multimedia film project devoted to Quebec history, based on thousands family movies collected from Quebecers. The project, called J’ai la mémoire qui tourne (My Memories On A Roll), caught the attention of the International Contest of Educational Programs in Japan, winning a nomination for the top prize. In 2011, Maroist and Ruel won a Pierre Berton award for this production - the highest distinction awarded by the Governor General of Canada for works on Canada's history, and the second time the award was given to Quebecers.

In 2014, Maroist and Eric Ruel released a documentary titled God Save Justin Trudeau, an examination of the role of showmanship in Canadian politics which questioned the state of Canadian democracy. The film was nominated for 2015 Gemini Awards. The duo then worked on a new TV series, Who We Are – a multi-platform multimedia documentary exploring 150 years of Canada's history through the eyes of generations of Canadians, using the "people’s history" methodology they developed for My Memories On A Roll.

In 2015, Maroist teamed up with Sergei Plekhanov of York University and the Canadian Pugwash Group to produce a documentary advocating the abolition of nuclear weapons.

In 2022, Maroist and Léa Clermont-Dion released the documentary film Backlash: Misogyny in the Digital Age. The film follows four women whose lives have been impacted by online misogyny: Laura Boldrini, Kiah Morris, Marion Séclin and Laurence Gratton. Donna Zuckerberg, a specialist in online violence against women and the sister of Facebook’s founder, features in it as an expert, as well as Sarah T. Roberts from UCLA.
