= The Case Against Adolescence =

2007 book by Robert Epstein

- Book cover of "Teen 2.0", the updated edition of "The Case Against Adolescence"
- Author: Robert Epstein
- Language: English
- Subject: Adolescence, developmental psychology
- Genre: Non-fiction
- Publisher: Quill Driver Books
- Publication date: 2007
- Publication place: United States
- Media type: Print (hardcover)
- Pages: 490
- ISBN: 978-1-884956-70-6
- OCLC: 84902974

The Case Against Adolescence: Rediscovering the Adult in Every Teen is a 2007 non-fiction book by American psychologist Robert Epstein. It was published by Quill Driver Books.

The book argues that adolescence, as a long period between childhood and adulthood, is largely a modern social creation. Epstein argues that many teenagers have abilities similar to those of adults, but are separated from adult society and are subject to many age-based restrictions. He uses the term "infantilization" for this treatment and argues that it can contribute to conflict and psychological problems among young people.

Epstein proposes replacing some age-based limits with a system based on individual competence. Under his proposal, young people could receive particular adult rights and responsibilities when they show that they are able to handle them.

== Background and publication ==
Epstein said that his interest in adolescence developed partly from his experience with his own children. He described one of his teenage sons as mature and questioned why the law still prevented him from doing many activities open to adults.

The book was published in the United States in 2007 by Quill Driver Books. The National Diet Library lists it as a 490-page book and classifies it under adolescence, adolescent psychology, maturation and developmental psychology.

In 2010, Epstein published a revised and expanded version under the title Teen 2.0: Saving Our Children and Families from the Torment of Adolescence. Epstein described Teen 2.0 as an updated and retitled version of The Case Against Adolescence. The new edition included updated information, additional material about youth rights and practical advice for parents.

== Contents and arguments ==
=== Artificial extension of childhood ===
Epstein argues that the modern idea of adolescence developed mainly during the late nineteenth and early twentieth centuries. He connects this change to compulsory education, restrictions on child labor and other laws that increasingly separated young people from adult work and adult society.

According to Epstein, these changes produced an "artificial extension of childhood". He argues that teenagers in many modern societies spend most of their time with people of the same age instead of learning and working with adults. In his view, this creates a separate youth culture and limits opportunities for young people to develop adult roles.

Epstein also rejects the idea that emotional conflict and difficult behavior are unavoidable parts of adolescence. He argues that some of these problems are influenced by the way society treats teenagers rather than being caused only by biological development.

=== Competence of young people ===
A major part of the book concerns the abilities of teenagers. Epstein argues that the abilities of teenagers are often underestimated. With psychologist Diane Dumas, he developed the Epstein-Dumas Test of Adultness (EDTA), which examines areas such as responsibility, leadership, interpersonal skills, problem solving, managing money and handling risky situations.

Epstein reported that teenagers who took the test performed at levels similar to adults in many of the areas measured. He used these results to argue that chronological age alone is not a good measure of a person's ability to take responsibility.

The book also discusses examples of young people who achieved important work in science, art and other fields. Epstein uses these examples to argue that teenagers can show high levels of creativity, reasoning and responsibility when they are given opportunities to do so.

=== Proposed changes ===
Epstein does not propose giving every teenager all adult rights automatically. Instead, he proposes a system in which young people could gain rights after showing the required competence.

The rights discussed by Epstein include the ability to work, own property, sign contracts, make some medical decisions and live independently. He also argues for more contact between teenagers and adults through employment, apprenticeships and other activities outside age-separated peer groups.

Epstein suggests that competence tests could be used in a similar way to driving tests: a person who demonstrates the necessary skills would receive the relevant right or responsibility.

== Reception ==
The book received both positive and critical reviews.

Developmental psychologist David Moshman reviewed the book together with Roger J. R. Levesque's Adolescents, Media, and the Law in the Journal of Applied Developmental Psychology. Moshman described Epstein as defending the competence and rights of teenagers while criticizing adolescence as a cultural category that treats them as children.

Hans A. Skott-Myhre, writing in The Journal of Mind and Behavior, called the book both an important and a problematic contribution to the study of adolescence as a social construction. He praised the amount of psychological material collected by Epstein, but argued that the book placed too much value on adulthood and presented an idealized picture of past relations between young people and adults.

A review in Psychiatric Times praised the large amount of scholarly literature discussed in the book but criticized Epstein's use of anecdotes and unusual individual cases. The review also questioned whether his proposed competency test could reliably decide which teenagers were ready for adult rights and responsibilities.

Mike Males, writing in Youth Today, described the book as an important challenge to negative views of young people and supported Epstein's criticism of age-based restrictions. However, he strongly disagreed with Epstein's description of American teenagers as increasingly troubled. Males argued that Epstein used misleading examples and did not give enough attention to factors such as poverty.

Time journalist John Cloud also disputed Epstein's description of widespread "teen turmoil". In an exchange with Epstein, Cloud pointed to data showing declines in youth drug use and crime and argued that Epstein had not shown that teenagers were more troubled than in earlier periods.

== Awards and recognition ==
The Case Against Adolescence was a finalist in the psychology category of the 2007 Foreword INDIES Book of the Year Awards.

In 2008, the San Diego Book Awards Association listed The Case Against Adolescence as the winner in its Social Science category.

== Later use ==
The book was cited in the 2010 U.S. Supreme Court case Graham v. Florida. In his dissenting opinion, Justice Clarence Thomas cited page 171 of the book while discussing research on moral reasoning among teenagers. Thomas referred to Epstein's statement that most teenagers are capable of conventional, adult-like moral reasoning.

== See also ==
- Adolescence
- Age of majority
- Developmental psychology
- Youth rights
- Adultcentrism
- Compulsory education
