= Véronique Morin =

Canadian science journalist

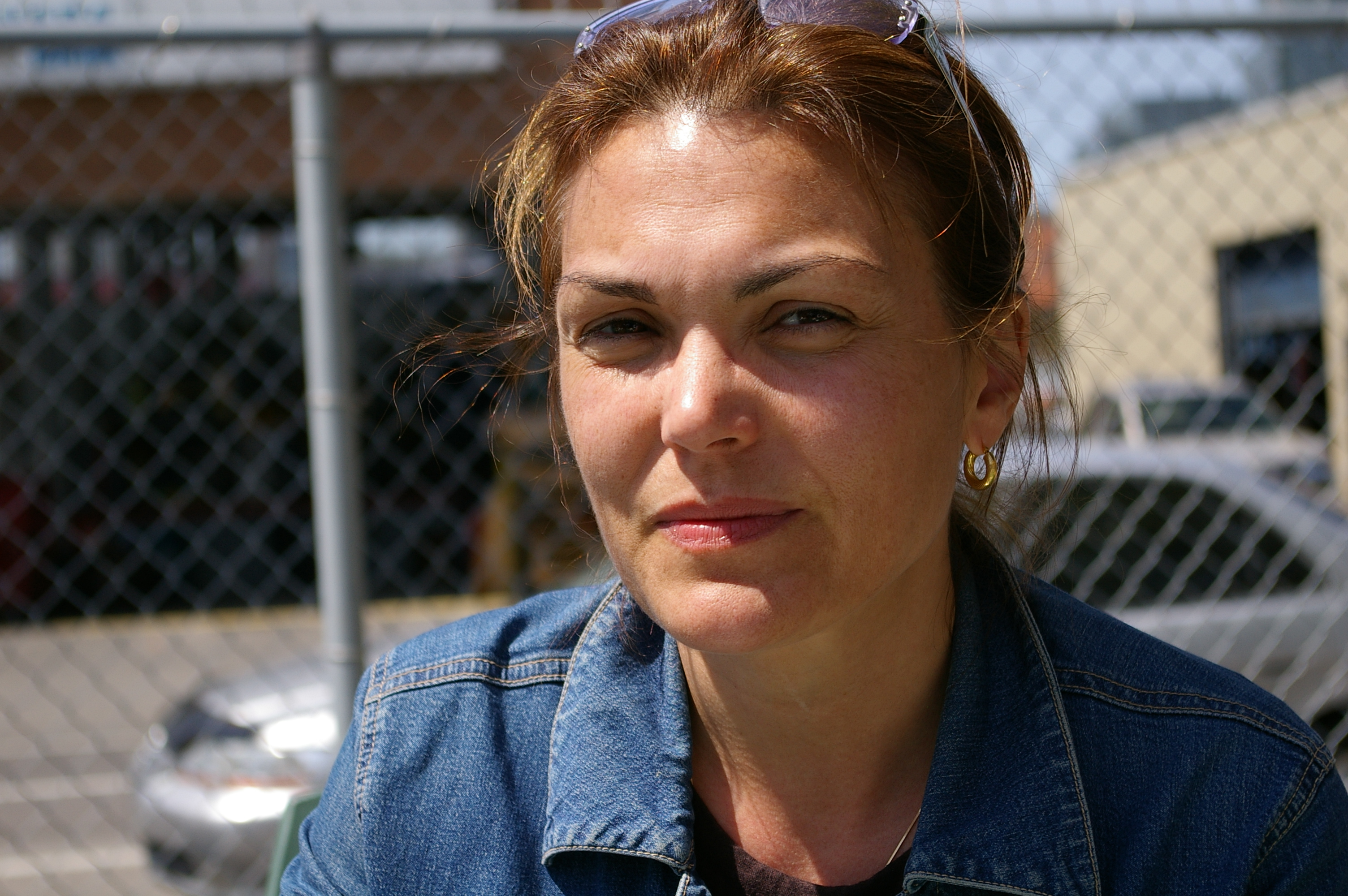
Véronique Morin in 2008

Véronique Morin is a Canadian science journalist.

== Academic background ==
Born in Quebec City, Quebec, Véronique Morin began her studies at the Collège Jésus-Marie in Sillery, where she completed her primary and secondary education and then obtained a college degree in pure and applied sciences, and sciences health at Champlain College St. Lawrence in Quebec City, the only English speaking General and Vocational College in this city. Subsequently, she obtained a multidisciplinary bachelor's degree from Laval University, which includes three components: one in economics, another in political science and a third in genetics and microbiology. She also holds a Certificate in Journalism from the same university.

== Professional career ==
Véronique Morin began her career as a reporter for CBC Radio-Canada in Toronto before becoming independent scriptwriter and act as a science journalist and co-host for the public affairs program Panorama on TFO, an educational and cultural television channel. She was a journalist and chase producer for CBC Newsworld in Halifax, Nova Scotia.

From 1999 to 2001, Véronique Morin was show producer at The Weather Network in Montreal where she has developed a new concept using 3D technology of the time. From 2001 to 2004 she was a writer and news anchor in Montreal news services on the radio and then at television for RDI of the CBC. From August 2007 to January 2016, she was part of the team of journalists of "Le Code Chastenay" which reports on scientific topics.

Véronique Morin has also published several articles as a freelance journalist in various publications and magazines such as CMAJ, University Affairs, Zoomer magazine, Découvrir, Cosmos, Commerce, Prestige and others.

== President of professional organizations ==
Besides the various positions she held, Véronique Morin was also president of the Canadian Science Writers' Association from 2001 to 2005. From 2002 to 2004 she was also the first President of the World Federation of Science Journalists (WFSJ).

== Other professional functions ==
Her involvement in science journalism led her to act as judge in several competitions in this field. She is also part of the Editorial Advisory Board of the Science Media Centre of Canada. She was also the chief organizer of the 2015 and 2016 Kavli Symposium on Science Journalism held from 16 to 18 February 2015, in San Jose, California, and from 15 to 17 February 2016 in Washington DC.

== Awards ==
=== Fellowships ===
Véronique Morin was awarded one of the Science Journalism Fellowships of Canadian Institutes of Health Research. She was recipient of the William Southam Journalism fellowship at Massey College (2013–2014). Thus becoming Webster McConnell Fellow.

=== Documentaries ===
With regard to television productions, she is one of the people who conceived the idea of making a documentary based on archive documents on involuntary participation of Canadian soldiers to nuclear tests that took place in 1957. She also participated in this production as a researcher. Time Bombs was retained by the New York International Independent Film and Video Festival and the Canadian Association of Broadcasters as best documentary in 2008. For this work, she was nominated for Gemini Awards 2008 in the "Best Research" category.

His documentary, “Meet Hubert Reeves, Astrophysicist: infinitely small to infinitely great,” was nominated in 1995 at the International Scientific Film Festival of Quebec. The Society of Obstetricians and Gynaecologists of Canada also awarded her in 2011 an honorable mention for the realization of the reportage entitled "Topo-ovule" presented on "Le Code Chastenay".

== Filmography ==
- Time Bombs, one-hour documentary (original idea/research)
- Weather in History, for MeteoMedia, a series of 12 vignettes on how history was shaped by weather events (producer/director/writer, 2000)
- Great Hurricanes of our Times, for MeteoMedia, a series of 5 documentaries on the most important hurricanes of the last century (producer/director/writer, 2000)
- Marine Archeology in Louisbourg, (producer/director/writers, 1997)
- Africville in Perspective, for TFO (1997)
- Wilma, the Orphan Beluga, (producer/director/writer, 1996)
- The Science behind the Wolves of Shubanacadie, (field producer/director/writer, 1996)
- Health Watch, for Life Channel, a series of 8-minute mini-documentaries (producer/director/writer, 1995–1998)
- Meet Hubert Reeves, Astrophysicist: infinitely small to infinitely great, for TFO (1995)
- Panorama, for TFO, regular contributor of mini-documentaries in science, environment and technology (1992–1995)
- Fall in hell of Tele-evangelist Pierre Lacroix, for Tele-Quatre-Saisons, a series of two 10-minute documentaries
- Quebec City Plagued by Drugs, for Tele-Quatre, a series of four 10-minute documentaries.

== Other activities and achievements ==
In 2004, Véronique Morin was the co-president of the World Conference of Science Journalists, held in Montreal that year, sitting on all committees of the Conference: the executive committee as well as those relating to financing, program and communication.

She was the lead moderator at the 2nd Symposium on Public Science in Canada, which took place May 12–14, 2010, and was held at the Hilton Hotel Leamy Lake, in Gatineau. The Professional Institute of the Public Service of Canada hosted the event.

She also participated in the creation of Prix Hubert-Reeves from the Association of Science Communicators Quebec rewarding Canadian author (s) of a popular science work published in French.

== See also ==
- Science journalism
- Science communication
