= Dot. =

Animated children's television series

- Genre: Animated series Preschool
- Created by: Randi Zuckerberg
- Based on: Dot. by Randi Zuckerberg
- Developed by: Industrial Brothers
- Directed by: M.R. Horhager
- Presented by: CBC
- Voices of: Lilly Bartlam; Isaiah Slater; Denise Oliver; Terry McGurrin
- Theme music composer: Ian LeFeuvre
- Composers: Ian LeFeuvre; Richard Pell
- Countries of origin: Canada; United States
- Original language: English
- No. of seasons: 2
- No. of episodes: 78

Production
- Executive producers: Lisa Henson; Randi Zuckerberg; Halle Stanford; Tammy Semen; Arthur Spanos
- Running time: 11 minutes
- Production companies: Industrial Brothers; The Jim Henson Company

Original release
- Network: CBC Kids (Canada); Universal Kids (USA)
- Release: September 6, 2016 – October 27, 2018

Dot. is an animated children's television series based on the book by Randi Zuckerberg. The series debuted on CBC Kids in Canada on September 6, 2016. The series later premiered on Universal Kids (then known as Sprout) in the United States on October 22, 2016. It began airing on Tiny Pop in the UK since 2017.

In January 2018, Dot. was renewed for a second season, which premiered on October 6, 2018, and aired the first four episodes until October 27 of the same year. It premiered on JimJam on February 6, 2017.

== Plot ==
Dot. follows the adventures, and some misadventures of an energetic 8-year-old ball of energy who uses technology in solving problems and exploring the world around her with her friends: Hal, Ruby, Nev, and Dev, along with her dog, Scratch.

== Characters ==
=== Main ===
- Dot Comet (voiced by Lilly Bartlam) is an energetic and tech-savvy 8-year-old who loves to explore the world. Her name is a play on the .com domain name. She wears a pink dotty dress, yellow rubber boots and she has short curly dark blue hair.
- Scratch Comet (voiced by Terry McGurrin) is Dot's best dog.
- Hal (voiced by Isaiah Slater) is Dot's best friend. He says he likes to role play.
- Ruby Marshall (voiced by Grace Oliver) is a blonde girl with glasses. In "Super Ruby" she is revealed to wear hearing aids.
- Nev Jumelle (voiced by Abigail Oliver) is the twin sister of Dev.
- Dev Jumelle (voiced by Ethan Tavares) is the twin brother of Nev.

=== Recurring ===
- Mrs. Comet (voiced by Denise Oliver) is Dot's mom. She sang the song "Oh Chanukah" with her daughter. As a child she lived with her father in the home where the Comets presently live.
- Mr. Comet (voiced by Terry McGurrin) is Dot's dad. He sang the song Up on the House Top with his daughter.
- Grandpapa (voiced by René Lemieux) is Dot's maternal grandfather.
- Anne is Dot's maternal grandmother.
- Nana (voiced by Lynne Griffin) is Dot's paternal grandmother.
- Greg is Hal's brother. He speaks in the episode "Hal In One", but his voice actor is uncredited.
- Mrs. Marshall (voiced by Nicki Burke) is Ruby's mother.
- Mr. Jumelle (voiced by Anand Rajaram) is the father of Nev and Dev, appearing alone in "Remembering Ogopogo" and "Garden Stakes", and accompanied by leas mother in "DramaRama".
- Knight (voiced by Juan Chioran)
- Judge (voiced by Terry McGurrin)
- Mr. Sherman (voiced by Art Hindle) is an old neighbor.
- Rangeroo Leader Kerry (voiced by Helen King) is a digital nature guide on Dot's tablet who educates her about the wilderness, often pre-empting her dad. In "Garden Stakes" Dot and Hal talk to her in person, calling her Rangeroo Leader Kerry.
- Stellakazam (voiced by Denise Oliver) is a stage magician who performed at Ruby's birthday party in which Dot was too sick to attend.

== Production ==
The series was announced in February 2014, when American entertainment company The Jim Henson Company secured the rights to Randi Zuckerberg first book Dot. as they would develop the book into a television series with The Jim Henson Company's CEO & president Lisa Henson alongside author Randi Zuckerberg would serve as executive producers on the upcoming series.

One year later in November 2015, Canadian broadcasting network CBC greenlighted the animated series called Dot. based on Randi Zuckerberg's book of the same name from American entertainment company The Jim Henson Company with Toronto-based animation production studio Industrial Brothers joined in the series as co-producer and would handle animation services for the series whilst American entertainment company The Jim Henson Company would handle global distribution rights to the series.

The first season, consisting of 52 episodes, was broadcast on October 22, 2016. A second season was ordered on January 26, 2018, which consisted of 26 episodes.

== Episodes ==
=== Season 1 (2016–2017) ===
| No. overall | No. in season | Title | Directed by | Written by | Canadian air date | U.S. air date |
|---|---|---|---|---|---|---|
| 1 | 1 | "Bring the Thunder" | M.R. Horhager | Craig Martin | September 6, 2016 | November 12, 2016 |
Dot tries to help her dog Scratch get over his phobia of thunder. She invites her best friend Hal to help.
| 2 | 2 | "One Soggy Knight" | M.R. Horhager | Craig Martin | September 8, 2016 | November 5, 2016 |
When Scratch's chew toy goes missing, Dot and her friends go on a journey to find it. The gang learn what it means to be chivalrous.
| 3 | 3 | "Treasure Hunting Dot" | M.R. Horhager | Craig Martin | September 8, 2016 | November 12, 2016 |
Dot's on an adventure to find many exciting treasures in a Geocache hunt. Mom and Hal help her realize that her friends and family are the most valuable treasure of all.
| 4 | 4 | "Easy Squeezy" | M.R. Horhager | Alice Prodanou | September 15, 2016 | November 5, 2016 |
Dot helps Hal with his lemonade stand.
| 5 | 5 | "Leaf it to Dot" | M.R. Horhager | Andrew Sabiston | September 20, 2016 | October 22, 2016 |
Dad takes Dot and Hal on a nature hike showing the kids why it's good to unplug sometimes, while Dot and Hal show Dad how tech and nature can work together.
| 6 | 6 | "A Dog's Best Friend" | M.R. Horhager | Amy Benham | September 22, 2016 | October 22, 2016 |
Dot builds Scratch a robot companion, wanting to give him his own best-dog. She soon comes to realize, however, that it is she who is Scratch's best dog.
| 7 | 7 | "Hello, Cello" | M.R. Horhager | Amy Benham | September 27, 2016 | October 22, 2016 |
Dot grows frustrated when she struggles to play the cello. Nev helps out by showing her that practice is the only way to get better.
| 8 | 8 | "Snow Day" | M.R. Horhager | Ashley Lannigan | September 29, 2016 | January 7, 2017 |
Dot's plan for a perfect snow day with her grandma is ruined when it doesn't snow. However, she quickly learns that they don't need snow to have fun.
| 9 | 9 | "Scaremaster 2.0" | M.R. Horhager | Craig Martin | October 25, 2016 | October 29, 2016 |
Dot gathers everyone together in a bid to scare her dad, but things don't go according to plan and the final scare comes from someone she didn't expect.
| 10 | 10 | "Ghoul Away!" "Ghoul Away" | M.R. Horhager | Andrew Sabiston | October 27, 2016 | October 29, 2016 |
Dot tries to get rid of a ghost.
| 11 | 11 | "Achoodini" "Achoo-dini" | M.R. Horhager | Emer Connon | November 8, 2016 | October 22, 2016 |
Ruby is hosting a magic-themed party for her birthday. Unfortunately, Dot is too ill to attend, leaving her devastated she will not be able to go. However, her dad has a plan to create some fun tricks with the symptoms from her cold.
| 12 | 12 | "Dot. Unplugged" "Unplugged" | M.R. Horhager | Amy Benham | November 10, 2016 | January 7, 2017 |
Dot and her family face a big change in their life when they decide they are going to take part in The National Day of Unplugging. It proves more difficult than they expected to not use technology.
| 13 | 13 | "Scratch Says" "Rosetta Bone" | M.R. Horhager | Emer Connon | November 15, 2016 | November 19, 2016 |
Dot wants everyone to be able to understand Scratch's thoughts like she can so she builds a translator app. However, she makes a mistake when she gives Scratch her own voice, creating confusion.
| 14 | 14 | "Dinner for Thirty" | M.R. Horhager | Craig Martin | November 17, 2016 | November 19, 2016 |
Dot accidentally prints too many dog bones with a 3D printer. However, when her house becomes overrun with furry guests, she must seek help.
| 15 | 15 | "Rocket out of the Park" | M.R. Horhager | Ashley Lannigan | November 22, 2016 | February 6, 2017 |
Dot and her friends are each going to build a rocket.
| 16 | 16 | "A Song For Everyone" | M.R. Horhager | Amy Benham | December 6, 2016 | November 26, 2016 |
Dot and her friends try their hand at writing a song for the Winter Concert in front of the town. However, their big performance is threatened by a snow storm.
| 17 | 17 | "The Holiday Tree" | M.R. Horhager | Meghan Read | December 13, 2016 | November 26, 2016 |
Dot accidentally throws out the town tree's decorations and is determined to make new ones. Working around the clock to create amazing decorations, she discovers the joy in giving to others.
| 18 | 18 | "Picture This" | M.R. Horhager | Alice Prodanou | December 31, 2016 | January 28, 2017 |
In order to show her mother her appreciation, Dot makes an elaborate thank you gift in the form of an animated movie, Super Mom.
| 19 | 19 | "Shallow End Hal" "Wave Goodbye" | M.R. Horhager | Amy Benham | January 3, 2017 | January 14, 2017 |
Dot and Hal are swimming in the lake for the first-time ever. While Dot is having fun floating among the fish, Hal struggles to float at all.
| 20 | 20 | "A Fishing Tale" | M.R. Horhager | Craig Martin | January 5, 2017 | February 11, 2017 |
Dot's dad is having a hard time catching fish, so Dot buys him a high-tech fish finder. They head out on the water, but the gadget causes some trouble for the pair when a massive fish takes a bite of it.
| 21 | 21 | "Hal in One" | M.R. Horhager | Ashley Lannigan | January 10, 2017 | January 14, 2017 |
Dot decides to help Hal get ready for his family's putt-putt tournament, by devising an elaborate home-made putt-putt course and putting him to work.
| 22 | 22 | "Remembering Ogopogo" | M.R. Horhager | Amy Benham | January 12, 2017 | January 24, 2017 |
Hal and Dot start their own pet-sitting business after they create a memorial video to help Dev and Nev when their pet goldfish named Ogopogo dies.
| 23 | 23 | "Gotcha" | M.R. Horhager | Kati Rocky | January 17, 2017 | January 24, 2017 |
Dot must stop a squirrel that has been taking things from her carefully maintained garden. Hal arrives in his robot costume. The squirrel refuses to leave Dot's strawberries alone and Dot thinks about defenses for her garden.
| 24 | 24 | "Garden Stakes" | M.R. Horhager | Andrew Sabiston | January 19, 2017 | January 28, 2017 |
Rangeroo Dot and Rangeroo Hal want to earn their Build-It Badges, so get to work building a community garden. Their efforts have an unintended consequence, developing community spirit.
| 25 | 25 | "Maker Breaker" | M.R. Horhager | Amy Benham | January 31, 2017 | February 6, 2017 |
Dot prepares for the Maker Festival and finds herself struggling with her project for the kids' event. She learns a valuable lesson on patience, as others teach her that it takes time to make something great.
| 26 | 26 | "Slumber Party" | M.R. Horhager | Robert Pincombe and Shelly Hoffman | February 21, 2017 | February 11, 2017 |
Dot is nervous sleeping over at Ruby Marshall's house but tries to hide it. She ends up comforting Nev, who also misses home. Dev is mentioned by Nev but he doesn't appear in this episode.
| 27 | 27 | "Dog Doc Dot" | M.R. Horhager | Meghan Read | March 2, 2017 | May 6, 2017 |
Scratch injures a paw while at the park. After returning from the vet, Dot decides she's not going to let Scratch out of her sight so that she can make sure he's safe. She performs an examination to make sure he's healthy.
| 28 | 28 | "Butterfly Away Home" | M.R. Horhager | Amy Benham | March 7, 2017 | May 6, 2017 |
Dot finds a caterpillar and decides to take him home to raise him into a butterfly. But he soon realizes he has trouble letting him go.
| 29 | 29 | "For Pet's Sake" | M.R. Horhager | Robert Pincombe and Shelly Hoffman | March 9, 2017 | May 13, 2017 |
In addition to her dog Scratch, Dot is tasked with looking after Ruby's cat Meryl, Hal's fish Sir Gilderson, Nev's bird Zippington, and Dev's tarantula Waldo.
| 30 | 30 | "Drama-Rama" "DramaRama" | M.R. Horhager | Kati Rocky | March 14, 2017 | May 13, 2017 |
Dot uses way too many special effects in a backyard play, which puts the entire production in jeopardy from being shut down.
| 31 | 31 | "What Goes Up Must Come Down" | M.R. Horhager | Phil McCordic | March 14, 2017 | May 20, 2017 |
When Dot traps Ruby's camera in a tree they both fling their shoes at it to try and get it down.
| 32 | 32 | "Dance Dot Dance" "Dance, Dot, Dance!" | M.R. Horhager | Meghan Read | April 4, 2017 | May 20, 2017 |
Dot is invited to Ruby's dance party, so Hal trains her to beat Move It Mania, then she finds out Ruby has Move it Mania 3.
| 33 | 33 | "Lights Out" | M.R. Horhager | Meghan Read | April 6, 2017 | May 26, 2017 |
Dot starts a campaign to see the Northern Lights from her own backyard during an electromagnetic storm that is brewing over the town.
| 34 | 34 | "Robo Racers" | M.R. Horhager | Craig Martin | April 11, 2017 | May 26, 2017 |
Dot builds a spider robot, Nev and Dev build a cheetah robot and Ruby and Hal build a frog robot. All their robots fail to pass the obstacle course, so they combine their robots into one and it completes the course.
| 35 | 35 | "Great Eggspectations" | M.R. Horhager | Alan Gregg | April 13, 2017 | May 26, 2017 |
When her parents get a chicken coop to avoid buying eggs, Dot names the three new hens Agatha, Princess Peck-Peck and Eliza-Bok. They're slow to lay eggs and Scratch chases them around the yard when the door is left open overnight.
| 36 | 36 | "Return to Sender" "Wish You Were Here" | M.R. Horhager | Robert Tinkler | April 13, 2017 | 25 May 2017 |
Dot's collection of postcards from Nana is growing and, inspired by it, she decides to make and send Nana a postcard of her own.
| 37 | 37 | "Big Help" | M.R. Horhager | Andrew Sabiston | April 27, 2017 | May 26, 2017 |
Dot and Hal do everything they can to get their Rangeroo Helper Badges but discover that finding a job that is worthy of the badge is really difficult.
| 38 | 38 | "Dot's Boots Were Made for Walking" | M.R. Horhager | Craig Martin | May 9, 2017 | May 27, 2017 |
Dot's family walk in a Rangeroo fundraiser for a very special field trip where they collect donations for every step they take in their journey.
| 39 | 39 | "The Ultimate Scratch Pad" | M.R. Horhager | Robert Pincombe and Shelley Hoffman | May 11, 2017 | May 27, 2017 |
Dot rebuilds Scratch's destroyed doghouse after a fallen tree branch falls on it. She decides to reconstruct it and give it a major doghouse renovation!
| 40 | 40 | "Fast and Fabulous Fixers Inc." "Fast and Fabulous Fixers" | M.R. Horhager | Andrew Sabiston | May 30, 2017 | 28 May 2017 |
Dot decides to open up her very own repair business but finds out that just because you can fix one thing, doesn't mean you can fix everything.
| 41 | 41 | "History Mystery" | M.R. Horhager | Charles Johnston | June 20, 2017 | September 9, 2017 |
Dot finds a secret treasure map in her basement which leads her and Hal to a buried treasure in her own backyard.
| 42 | 42 | "Bad Borrower" | M.R. Horhager | Amy Benham | June 22, 2017 | September 10, 2017 |
Dot discovers that her friends think she's a bad borrower when she asks to borrow Hal's digital camera. After she misplaces the camera, she thinks her friends might be right about her.
| 43 | 43 | "Swap Bop" | M.R. Horhager | Charles Johnston | June 27, 2017 | September 9, 2017 |
Dot and Hal have a garage sale so they can afford to buy a flashy new toy, but chaos ensues when they realize they've accidentally traded away something valuable.
| 44 | 44 | "Sticky Situation" | M.R. Horhager | Robert Tinkler | June 29, 2017 | September 10, 2017 |
Dot tries to have a fun time at her party, even when no one shows up. She assumes her friends don't want to hang out with her, but she is determined to have a good time anyway.
| 45 | 45 | "So Much to Do, So Little Dot" | M.R. Horhager | Jay Vaidya | August 3, 2017 | September 16, 2017 |
Dot really wants to spend time with all of her friends, but she doesn't have enough time and ends up spreading herself too thin amongst her friends.
| 46 | 46 | "The Shooting Star" | M.R. Horhager | Alan Gregg | August 8, 2017 | September 17, 2017 |
Dot is excited for Ruby to come with her to an astroclub meeting, but Ruby doesn't want to be there and would rather be at a concert.
| 47 | 47 | "The Clean Team" | M.R. Horhager | Andrew Sabiston | August 15, 2017 | September 16, 2017 |
Dot's day out at the beach is ruined by rubbish, so she tries to make it better by setting out to solve the world's littering problem.
| 48 | 48 | "One Trick Doggy" | M.R. Horhager | Amy Benham | August 31, 2017 | September 17, 2017 |
Dot is excited to enter Scratch in a dog show. However, she goes a little overboard in her preparations during her excitement.
| 49 | 49 | "Best Friend Showdown" | M.R. Horhager | Amy Benham | September 5, 2017 | September 23, 2017 |
Dot gets caught up in the middle of a showdown between Ruby and Hal, as they fight over who Dot's one and only best friend is.
| 50 | 50 | "Snow Business" | M.R. Horhager | Charles Johnston | September 5, 2017 | September 24, 2017 |
Dot and Hal decide to enter the snow business to raise enough money for a new toboggan. However, they soon realize that being an entrepreneur is a lot of hard work.
| 51 | 51 | "Souptacular Staycation" | M.R. Horhager | Meghan Read | September 7, 2017 | September 24, 2017 |
Dot goes on an interesting staycation with Hal and Nana when she is sad to be missing out on another trip with Mom and Dad.
| 52 | 52 | "Super Ruby" | M.R. Horhager | Meghan Read | September 14, 2017 | September 24, 2017 |
Dot helps Ruby get fitted for brand-new hearing aids. Along the way, they meet a woman with a fascinating bionic arm.

=== Season 2 (2018) ===
NOTE: The following list is incomplete. You can help by expanding it.

| No. overall | No. in season | Title | Directed by | Written by | U.S. air date | Canadian air date |
|---|---|---|---|---|---|---|
| 53 | 1 | "Painting With Dot" / "Making Your Own Way" | Unknown | Unknown | October 6, 2018 | TBA |
| 54 | 2 | "Looth Tooth" / "Facing the Fanged Fury" | Unknown | Unknown | October 7, 2018 | TBA |
| 55 | 3 | "On the Campaign Trail" / "Adopt-A-Doggie Show" | Unknown | Unknown | October 13, 2018 | TBA |
| 56 | 4 | "Nana Banana Road Trip-a-Rama" / "Treasure Lost and Treasure Found" | Unknown | Unknown | October 27, 2018 | TBA |

=== Do's & Dots (2016) ===
A series of shorts called "Do's and Dots" was available on Universal Kids' website in 2016.

| No. | Title | Original release date |
|---|---|---|
| 1 | "Be Kind" | TBA |
| 2 | "Be Patient" | TBA |
| 3 | "Be Respectful" | TBA |
| 4 | "Be Responsible" | TBA |
| 5 | "Be Safe" | TBA |

== Broadcast ==
Dot. premiered on JimJam in Pan-Europe on May 1, 2017 and Pikaboo in the Ex-Yugoslav countries and Albania sometime in 2018. The series also airs on Canal Panda in Portugal, Piwi+ in France, and SVT in Sweden as of 2017. Hulu also acquired exclusive SVOD rights to Dot. and the series became available to stream on April 15. The show is currently airing on ABC Kids in Australia, Tiny Pop in United Kingdom and Clan TVE, Super3 and Nickelodeon in Spain.

== Reception ==
It got a 5 out of 5 on Common Sense Media, quoting:

"Parents need to know that Dot. is based on a picture book by Randi Zuckerberg and centers on a curious 8-year-old who uses technology, math, and science concepts to learn new things, but it's never at the expense of real-world experiences and the people she cares about. For Dot and her family, it's all about balance, so much attention is given to the times when she acknowledges she's ready to unplug. The show sets out to expose kids -- and girls in particular -- to science, technology, engineering, and math (STEM) concepts in an inviting, age-appropriate way through the likable, self-confident titular character. As a bonus, it presents Dot's parents as her role models and educator, and her friends as positive influences in her life."

== Media information ==
An HTML game called Dot's Rangeroo Scavenger Hunt is available on Kids' CBC and Universal Kids's websites. Another game, inspired by Atari's earliest arcade game Pong, Make a Game with Dot, is available on the Universal Kids website as well. An app, inspired by Wikipedia, Dotopedia, for Android and iOS devices was also released on December 12, 2016.
