= Real Facebook Oversight Board =

Private advocacy group

- Named after: Oversight Board (Meta)
- Formation: September 25, 2020; 6 years ago
- Founder: Carole Cadwalladr
- Website: the-citizens.com/action/real-facebook-oversight-board/

The Real Facebook Oversight Board is an entity founded in 2020 by British journalist Carole Cadwalladr, in response to Facebook's announcement of the creation of its Oversight Board to address contentious content decisions made by the company through an independent appellate process.

The "Real Facebook Oversight Board", by contrast, is not affiliated with Facebook, but is composed of "vocal Facebook critics" who have claimed to offer better oversight over Facebook than a board affiliated with the company. Unlike the board formed by the company, this entity has no authority to review decisions made by Facebook personnel.

== Members ==
The group announced 25 members on September 25, 2020. These include:

- Ruha Benjamin, associate professor of African American studies at Princeton University
- Damian Collins, member of the Parliament of the United Kingdom
- Yael Eisenstat, ex-CIA officer and former head of election integrity operations for political ads at Facebook
- Jonathan Greenblatt, National Director and CEO of the Anti-Defamation League
- Derrick Johnson, president of the NAACP
- Reed Galen, co-founder of the conservative anti-Trump super PAC The Lincoln Project
- Toomas Hendrik Ilves, former president of Estonia
- Roger McNamee, tech investor and frequent Facebook critic
- Shireen Mitchell, founder of Digital Sistas
- Safiya Noble, associate professor of information studies and African American studies at UCLA
- Maria Ressa, co-founder of the Filipino independent news site Rappler
- Rashad Robinson, president of Color of Change, a nonprofit civil rights organization
- Marietje Schaake, Dutch politician and international policy director at Stanford University's Cyber Policy Center
- Jim Steyer, children's advocate
- Timothy Snyder, author and historian
- Laurence Tribe, Carl M. Loeb University Professor at the Harvard Law School
- Shoshana Zuboff, author of "The Age of Surveillance Capitalism: The Fight for a Human Future at the New Frontier of Power"

Others who have since been identified as members of the group include Jessica J. González of Free Press, and Heidi Beirich of the Global Project Against Hate and Extremism.

== History ==
Facebook's announced introduction of the Oversight Board elicited a variety of responses, with St. John's University law professor Kate Klonick describing its creation as an historic endeavor, and technology news website The Verge deeming it "a wild new experiment in platform governance".

Even before the board made its first decisions, however, critics speculated that the board would be too strict, too lenient, or otherwise ineffective, leading to the creation of an unrelated and unaffiliated group of "vocal Facebook critics" calling itself the "Real Facebook Oversight Board". Facebook criticized this group and said it was undermining its efforts, while Slate described it as "a citizen campaign against the board".

Following the release of the Oversight Board's first set of decisions in 2021, which tended to overturn the removal of contested content in favor free speech, the RFOB released a statement deeming the decisions a "troubling precedent for human rights" due to their potential to allow the publication on social media of potentially offensive content.

Regarding the pending appeal of Donald Trump's Facebook ban, the group has asserted that the process is arbitrary and "will not address the root concerns", and is "skewed by how Facebook referred the decision to the board". The group "submitted a public comment to the Oversight Board on the case, warning that reinstating Trump is an 'invitation to violence, hate and disinformation that will cost lives and undermine democracy'".

In October 2022, policy advisor Zamaan Qureshi criticized Facebook's algorithms as failing to prioritize news over sensationalism. In December 2022, Qureshi commented on the recent revelation that Zuckerberg had excised mention of Cambridge Analytica from a 2017 speech. In 2023, the group said that the decision to re-platform Donald Trump "sends a message that there are no real consequences even for inciting insurrection and a coup".
