= The Creepy Line =

- Directed by: M.A Taylor
- Written by: Peter Schweizer; M.A Taylor
- Produced by: Peter Schweizer; Eric Eggers; William Pilgrim; Michelle N. Taylor
- Starring: Robert Epstein; Jordan Peterson; Peter Schweizer
- Cinematography: Dain Valverde
- Edited by: M.A. Taylor; Dain Valverde
- Music by: Jay Smith
- Production company: Wandering Foot Productions
- Distributed by: Amazon Prime Video
- Release date: December 18, 2018
- Running time: 80 minutes
- Country: United States
- Language: English

The Creepy Line is a 2018 American documentary exploring the influence Google and Facebook have on public opinion, and the power the companies have that is not regulated or controlled by national government legislation.

The title is taken from a quote by Eric Schmidt, who when describing Google's use of personal information stated that the company did not cross the line that an ordinary user would find unacceptable. It was released on December 18, 2018.

== Synopsis ==
The film contrasts the notion of fake news which is visible, with the invisible ranking or masking of information by Google and Facebook, and features headshot interviews with Robert Epstein, Jaron Lanier, Jordan Peterson and Peter Schweizer.

== Reception ==
The Verge reviewed The Creepy Line, writing that "Despite its dark name, The Creepy Line appeals to the comforting logic of conspiracy: when something goes wrong in life, it’s because an all-powerful entity thinks you’re important enough to attack."
