= Little People (TV series) =

Animated series

- Genre: Children's; Adventure; Comedy
- Created by: Robin Budd
- Based on: Little People by Mattel
- Theme music composer: Jay Vincent; Michael Kramer
- Opening theme: The Adventure Song
- Composers: Rob Lord (Season 1); Matt Davis (Season 2)
- Countries of origin: Canada; United States
- Original language: English
- No. of seasons: 2
- No. of episodes: 52

Production
- Executive producers: Christopher Keenan; Steven DeNure; Kirsten Newlands; Mark Gosine; Josh Scherba
- Producers: Rick Siggelkow; Phillip Stamp (Note: Supervising producer.)
- Running time: 11 minutes
- Production companies: HIT Entertainment (Season 1); Mattel Creations (Season 2)

Original release
- Network: Sprout
- Release: March 7, 2016 – February 1, 2018

Little People is a children's animated television series based on Fisher-Price's toy line of the same name. The series was produced by HIT Entertainment (for Season 1) and Mattel Creations (for Season 2), with animation production by DHX Media's Halifax studio. It premiered on Sprout on March 7, 2016. 52 episodes were produced.

It has been renewed for a second season, which started airing in 2018.

== Premise ==
The series follows five friends go on adventures through different worlds, learning about empathy, cooperation, and fairness through laughter, music, and imagination.

== Characters ==
=== Main ===
- Eddie (voiced by Kannon Kurowski in season 1 and Ethan Pugiotto in season 2) is a Caucasian-American boy with blonde hair. He wears a white T-shirt with an explosion on it, orange pants, and blue shoes.
- Koby (voiced by Aden Schwartz in season 1 and Nicolas Aqui in Season 2) is an Asian-American boy with black hair. He wears an orange T-shirt with a robot head on it, blue pants, and red-orange shoes.
- Mia (voiced by Emma Shannon in season 1 and Millie Davis in season 2) is a Hispanic-American girl with brown hair. She wears a white T-shirt with a pink dress over it and pink shoes with white socks. She has a red hair bow attached to her red headband.
- Sofie (speaking voice by Taylor Autumn Bertman in season 1 and Shechinah Mpumlwana in Season 2) is a Caucasian-American girl with red hair and freckles on her face. She wears a teal dress, striped tights, pink shoes, and pink framed glasses. Her hair is styled in pigtails with blue and pink ribbons. Her singing voice is provided by Kallan Holley.
- Tessa (voiced by Sanai Victoria in Season 1 and Chloe Bryer in Season 2) is an African-American girl with black hair. She wears a lime green T-shirt with a yellow flower on it, a purple skirt, pink leggings, and yellow shoes. Her hair is styled in buns with lime green hair elastics.
- Lucky is a white dog who has brown spots.

=== Recurring ===
- Jack (voiced by Christopher Schleicher in Season 1 and Evan Blaylock in Season 2) is Emma's younger brother. He wears a blue T-shirt with a green pocket on it and khaki pants.
- Emma (voiced by Nicole Moorea Sherman in Season 1 and Lilly Bartlam in Season 2) is Jack's older sister. She wears a purple dress with a blue flower on it, a pink headband with white stars, and pink shoes.
- Humpty Dumpty (voiced by Jason LaShea and Jamie Watson)
- King Pigalot (voiced by Robbie Daymond)
- Queen Tortoise (voiced by Dana Rosario)
- Chris (voiced by Chris Marek) is a boy. He wears a red shirt with a blue car on it, light gray pants, and blue shoes.

== Production ==
The show was placed into pre-production in June 2014 for a potential 2015 season premiere. The show was introduced at a Licensing Expo on June 17, 2014. The show came as the first Fisher-Price brand done by newly acquired (2012) Hit. The show debuted on weekday schedule on Sprout in the United States on March 7, 2016 and on Family Jr. in Canada on March 1, 2017. Cartoon Network UK's sister preschool channel Cartoonito premiered the Little People TV series on April 11, 2016.

== Episodes ==
=== Season 1 (2016-2017) ===
Each adventure has songs, dancing and imagination.

1. Teamwork Takes Talent!/Imagination Cures the Blues!
2. Proud to Be You and Me!/Better Learn to Wait Your Turn!
3. The Right (and Left) Stuff/Carried Away and Back Again
4. Never Cheat to Beat!/Just Compare Yourself to You
5. Different Makes the Wool Go 'Round/A Walk in Someone Else's Hooves
6. One for All and All for Fun!/If I Rule Jungleland
7. Sometimes Enough is Enough!/Roar in the Face of Fright!
8. Headed in the Right Direction/Don't Be Selfish Said the Shellfish
9. Party of One is No Fun!/Listening For Treasure!
10. Being a Big Cheese is Cheesy!/A Taste of Her Own Medicine!
11. Nothing Wrong With Being Wrong!/Friendship is a Two Way Tale
12. Collecting Conclusion Clues!/You're Your Best You're Yourself!
13. No Shortcuts to Responsibility!/Promises, Promises!
14. Swallowing Fears/Different Strokes for Different Folks!
15. The Many Colors of Kindness/Two Heroes are Better Than One!
16. Don't Judge a Book By Its Sparkles!/New Things Equal Cold Feet
17. Me, Myself, and Eddie/May the Frost Be With You!
18. Acting Icy Can Be Dicey!/Never Too Late to Listen!
19. Bully Goat Gruff/Working Together is Way Better
20. Be True to You!/Don't Lie to Get By!
21. Give it Back!/When Your Chum is Glum
22. A Party Together is Better/Hurry Up and Wait!
23. Distraction Misses the Action/Being Picky Can Get Tricky
24. Cleaning the Air/Rumor Ruckus
25. Stash Your Trash/Dance to Your Own Jungle Drum
26. The Trouble With Bulls and Frogs/Nuts for Sharing!

=== Season 2 (2018) ===
Each airs with the episodes divided into two-eleven minute episode segments. The Adventure Song changed and some cast voices changed.

1. Take Turns to Talk/Fly High and Try
2. Team Hero/Potty Ahoy
3. Don't Dawdle/As You Like It
4. A Space of His Own/Say So If You Don't Know
5. Getting to Know You/Cast Aside
6. Special Delivery/What Would Lucky Like?
7. Itching for Trouble/What's Old is New
8. Interrupting Cow/No Fair at the Fair
9. Give a Little Listen/Trust The Jungle Bus
10. United We Solve/A Promise Is a Promise
11. A New Friend For All/Braver Together
12. Easy Peasy/Everyone Deserves a Turn
13. Snail Mail/Rainy Day Delay
14. Sofie's Photo No-No/A Time and a Place
15. Nothing to Sneeze At/Koby Speaks Up
16. Messy Mia/The Tessa Show
17. The Princess and the Parade/Radical Rainbow Road Race
18. Cookie Caper/Just My Luck
19. Koby's Penguin Posse/Mia the Magnificent
20. Awesomely Amazing Picnic Adventure/The Big Beautiful Butter Beast
21. Beginners are Winners/Emma by the Book
22. Jack of the Jungle/Eddie and the Yeti
23. Firehouse Four/A Place for Friendly Friends
24. Delivering Happiness/Castaway Capers
25. The Lepo-Potamus/Treasure Beyond Measure
26. Listen Up/Worth the Wait

== Home media ==
In 2018, Universal Pictures Home Entertainment signed a deal with DHX Media and Mattel Creations to purchase the North American DVD rights to Little People. In Italy, Eagle Pictures will release the series soon on DVD. In Germany, Just Bridge Entertainment released the series on DVD. In UK, Abbey Home Media Group released the series on DVD.
