= Randi Zuckerberg =

American businesswoman (born 1982)

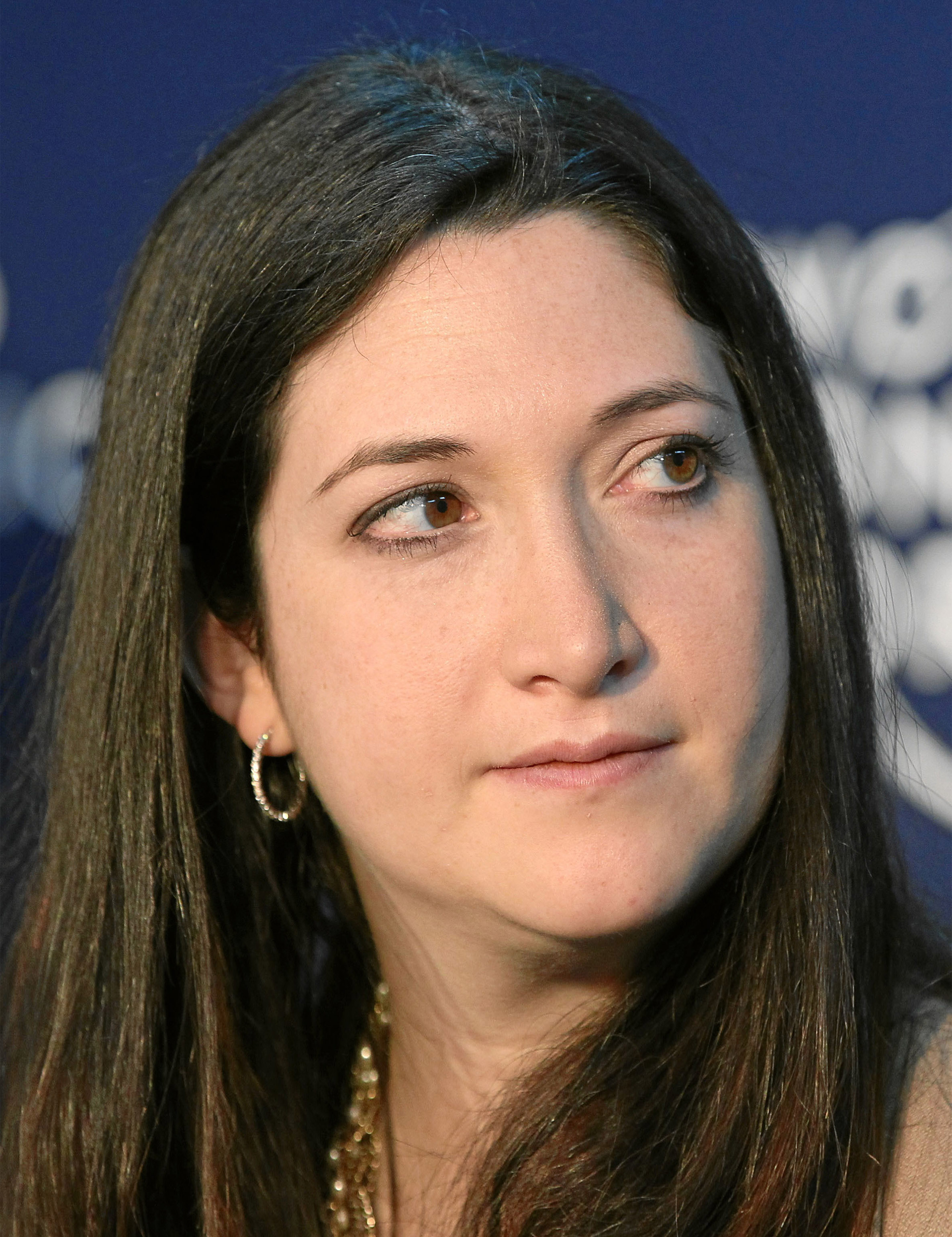
- Zuckerberg in 2012
- Born: Randi Jayne Zuckerberg; February 28, 1982 (age 44); Westchester County, New York, U.S.
- Education: Harvard University (BA)
- Occupation: Businesswoman
- Spouse: Brent Tworetzky
- Children: 3
- Relatives: Mark Zuckerberg (brother); Donna Zuckerberg (sister)

Randi Jayne Zuckerberg (born February 28, 1982) is an American businesswoman. She is the former director of market development and spokesperson for Facebook, and a sister of the company's co-founder and CEO Mark Zuckerberg. She currently hosts Randi Zuckerberg Means Business on SiriusXM on Wednesdays.

== Education ==
In 2003, Zuckerberg graduated from Harvard University with a bachelor's degree in psychology.

== Career ==
Zuckerberg worked as an assistant account executive at advertising firm Ogilvy & Mather in 2003, and later spent a year working at Forbes as an account executive.

In 2005, Randi Zuckerberg was recruited by her younger brother Mark Zuckerberg to work at Facebook. Randi Zuckerberg was one of the first ten Facebook employees. During her six years at Facebook, she steered projects such as Facebook Live, President Obama’s Facebook Town Hall, The CNN/Facebook 2009 Inauguration Partnership and the ABC News/Facebook Presidential Primary Debates in 2008.

Zuckerberg organized, and was also a correspondent for the 2008 ABC News/Facebook Democratic Party and Republican Party U.S. presidential primaries debates.

In 2010, Zuckerberg was ranked among 50 "Digital Power Players" by The Hollywood Reporter.

In 2011, Zuckerberg announced her new digital media production firm, named "Zuckerberg Media". Since starting Zuckerberg Media, Randi has produced shows and digital content for BeachMint, the Clinton Global Initiative, Cirque du Soleil, the United Nations, Condé Nast and Bravo. She was nominated for an Emmy Award for her coverage of the 2010 United States elections.

In 2014, she began hosting Randi Zuckerberg Means Business on SiriusXM, and in 2016 she launched Dot., an animated kid's television series. Zuckerberg voices the character "Ms. Randi".

== Personal life ==
Zuckerberg and her husband Brent Tworetzky have three children. The family resides in New York City.
