= Lilly Bartlam =

Canadian actress

- Born: Lilly Noelle Bartlam; July 17, 2006 (age 20); Grand Bend, Ontario, Canada
- Occupation: Actress
- Years active: 2013-present

Lilly Noelle Bartlam (born July 17, 2006) is a Canadian actress. She received two Canadian Screen Award nominations at the 9th Canadian Screen Awards in 2021, in the categories of Best Performance in an Animated Program or Series for her role as Skye in Paw Patrol and Best Performance in a Children's or Youth Program or Series for her role as Kelly Darnell in Detention Adventure.

Bartlam's first leading role in a live-action role was Detention Adventure after having been associated primarily with voice roles in animation. Her prior credits have included supporting or guest roles in Creeped Out, The Magic School Bus Rides Again, Esme & Roy, Creative Galaxy and Little People, and starring roles in Total DramaRama and Dot. She is also the guest voice of Hacker's niece, Harmony from Cyberchase. She made her feature film debut in Paw Patrol: The Movie.

== Early life ==
Bartlam was born in Grand Bend, Ontario to Lara and David Bartlam.

== Filmography ==
=== Television ===
Year	Title	Role	Notes	Source
2013	Kids' CBC	Young Sarah		
2016–2018	Dot.	Dot Comet (voice)	Main role	
2018	Little People	Emma (voice)	Recurring role (season 2)	
2018	The Next Step	Dancer	Episode: "Sweet and Salty"	
2018	Creative Galaxy	Annie (voice)	Recurring role (season 3)	
2018–2023	Total DramaRama	Gwen (voice)	Main role	
2019–present	Paw Patrol	Skye (voice)	Main role (seasons 6–present)	
2019–present	Cyberchase	Harmony (voice)	2 episodes	
2020	What We Do in the Shadows	Houston	Episode: "Collaboration"	
2020–present	Detention Adventure	Kelly Darnell	10 episodes	

=== Film ===
Year	Title	Role	Notes	Source
2016	Age of Reason	Princess 1	Short film	
2018	The Sunset Channel	Anna	Short film	
2021	Paw Patrol: The Movie	Skye (voice)		
