= Time Bombs =

- Directed by: Guylaine Maroist; Éric Ruel
- Produced by: Guylaine Maroist; Éric Ruel
- Narrated by: Vlasta Vrána; Réal Bossé
- Cinematography: Steeve Desrosiers; Douglas Munro; Jean-François Perreault
- Edited by: Éric Ruel
- Production company: Productions de la ruelle inc.
- Release date: 2008
- Country: Canada
- Language: English

Time Bombs is a 2008 Canadian film directed by Guylaine Maroist and Éric Ruel. It was produced by "Productions de la ruelle".

== Plot ==
In the spring of 1957, 40 young Canadian soldiers were sent to Nevada on a top secret mission. These young men did not know they would be used as guinea pigs in the most important nuclear testing program of the Cold War. The American military wanted to know how the average soldier would hold up on a nuclear battlefield.

With absolutely no knowledge of the effects of radiation, the young men played war games, sometimes less than 1,000 yards (910 m) away from exploding nuclear weapons — bombs as much as four times more powerful than the bomb dropped on Hiroshima on August 6, 1945. The effects were devastating. Many of the men fell gravely ill, and some of their children were born with deformities or handicaps.

The controversial operation has never received official recognition from the Canadian government. 50 years after the tests, Time Bombs follows the Atomic Veterans in their quest for recognition from the government.

== Technical information ==
- Production: Les Productions de la ruelle inc.
- Producers: Guylaine Maroist and Éric Ruel
- Directors: Guylaine Maroist and Éric Ruel
- Original idea: Pierre Brisson et Véronique Morin
- Voice over: Vlasta Vrana and Réal Bossé
- Director of photography: Steeve Desrosiers, Douglas Munro, c.s.c. and Jean-François Perreault
- Visual mixing: Éric Ruel
- Sound editing: Louis Dupire and Eric Ruel
- Sound mixing: Jean-Paul Vialard, ONF
- Scenario: Guylaine Maroist
- Research: Pierre Brisson, Guylaine Maroist and Véronique Morin
- Visual research: Ginette Beauchemin and Éric Ruel

== Awards ==
- 2008 won the golden ribbon award for best documentary from the Canadian Association of Broadcasters
- 2008 won the grand jury prize for best documentary at the New York International Independent Film Festival

== See also ==
- Operation Plumbbob
