= Safiya Noble =

American professor and author

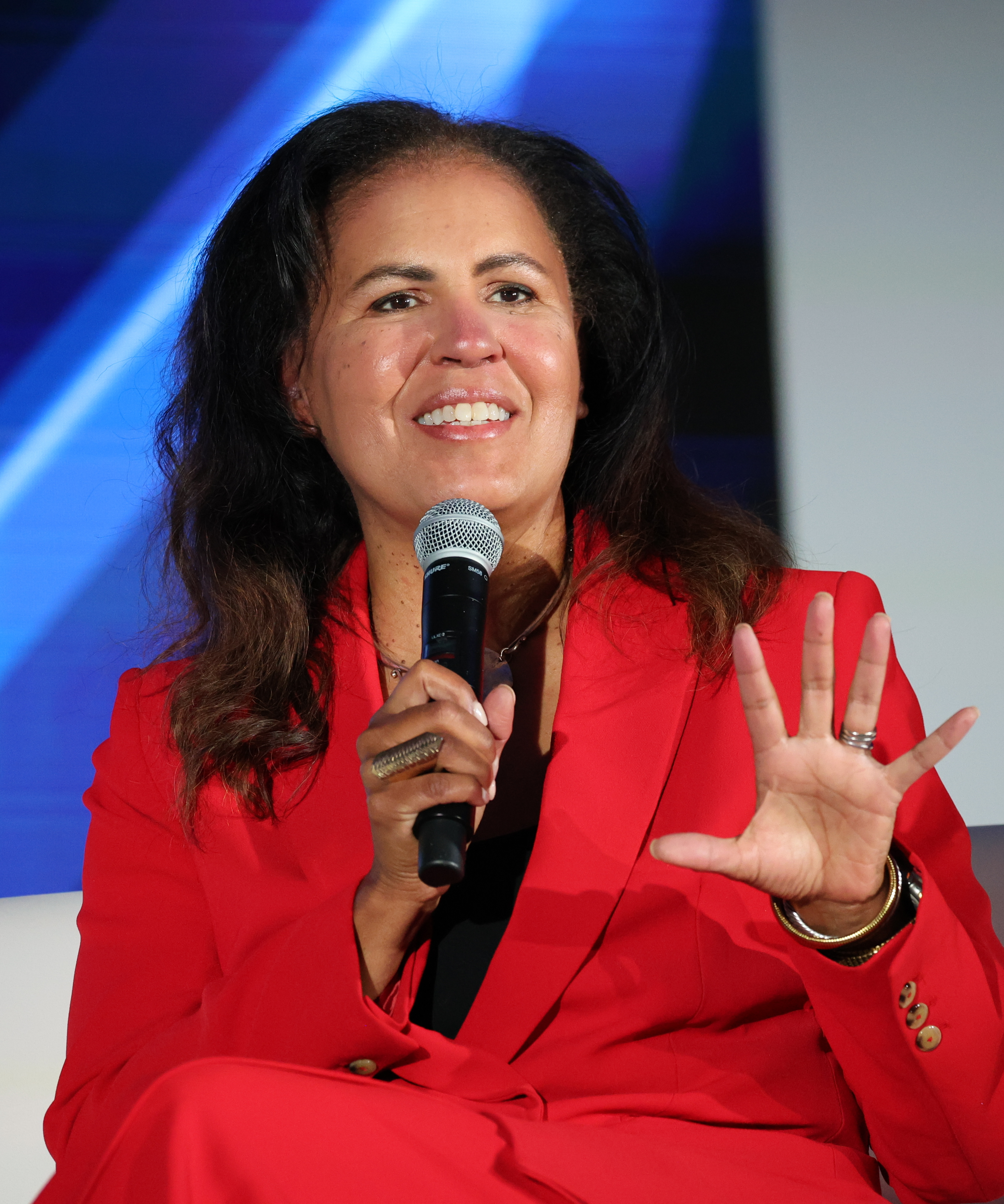
- Known for: Algorithms of Oppression
- Awards: MacArthur Fellow

Academic background
- Education: California State University, Fresno (BA); University of Illinois, Urbana-Champaign (MLIS, PhD)
- Thesis: Searching for Black Girls: Old Traditions in New Media (2012)

Academic work
- Institutions: University of Illinois at Urbana-Champaign; University of California, Los Angeles; University of Southern California
- Website: Official website

Safiya Umoja Noble is the David O. Sears presidential endowed chair of social sciences and professor of gender studies, African American studies, and information studies at the University of California, Los Angeles (UCLA). She is the director of the UCLA Center on Race & Digital Justice and co-director of the Minderoo Initiative on Tech & Power at the UCLA Center for Critical Internet Inquiry (C2i2). She serves as interim director of the UCLA DataX Initiative, leading work in critical data studies.

Noble is the author of a bestselling book on racist and sexist algorithmic harm in commercial search engines, entitled Algorithms of Oppression: How Search Engines Reinforce Racism (New York University Press), which has been widely reviewed in scholarly and popular publications. In 2021, she was recognized as a MacArthur Fellow for her groundbreaking work on algorithmic bias.

She is a board member of the Cyber Civil Rights Initiative, a non-profit organization that provides services to victims of cybercrimes. Noble is a research associate at the Oxford Internet Institute where she is also a chartering member of the International Panel on the Information Environment. In 2022, noble was recognized as the inaugural NAACP-Archewell Digital Civil Rights Award recipient.

She was both appointed as a commissioner to the University of Oxford Commission on Artificial Intelligence and Good Governance and was nominated to the Global Future Council on Artificial Intelligence for Humanity at the World Economic Forum in 2020.

== Early life and education ==
Noble grew up in Fresno, California and later studied sociology at California State University, Fresno with a focus on African American studies and ethnic studies. While at Fresno State, Noble was involved with the "campus political scene," protesting against apartheid and campaigning for racial equality and gender equality. She was an active member of the Associated Students, Inc. and the California State Student Association. After she graduated, Noble worked for more than a decade in multicultural marketing, advertising, and public relations.

Noble later attended the University of Illinois Urbana-Champaign for graduate studies where she earned a master's degree and Ph.D. in library and information science. Her 2012 dissertation, Searching for black girls: old traditions in new media, considered how gender and race manifest on technology platforms.

== Career ==
Noble was appointed assistant professor at the University of Illinois Urbana-Champaign in the Department of African-American Studies, the Department of Media and Cinema Studies, and the Institute for Communication Research. In 2014, she joined the University of California, Los Angeles's Department of Information Studies. She was awarded the University of California, Los Angeles Early Career Award in 2016. The same year she was appointed a Hellman Fellow. Noble received academic tenure at UCLA and was promoted to associate professor in 2018.

Noble joined the University of Southern California from 2017 to 2019 as a visiting assistant professor where she focused on the politics and human and civil rights concerns of digital media platforms, which includes the integration of these issues in STEM education.

On 25 September 2020, Noble was named as one of the 25 members of the Real Facebook Oversight Board, an independent monitoring group for Facebook. In October 2020, she was featured in conversation with Meghan, Duchess of Sussex and Prince Harry, Duke of Sussex on the harms of technology, and her book Algorithms of Oppression was cited by Meghan, Duchess of Sussex for outlining how "the digital space really shapes our thinking about race."

Noble was awarded a MacArthur Fellowship in 2021.

== Research ==
Noble's academic research focuses on the Internet and its impact on society. Her work is both sociological and interdisciplinary, marking the ways that digital media intersects with issues of race, gender, culture, power, and technology. Her expertise on issues of algorithmic discrimination and technology bias has been covered by Rolling Stone, The Guardian, BBC, CNN International, USA Today, Wired, Full Frontal with Samantha Bee, and The New York Times. Her popular writing includes critiques on the loss of public goods to Big Tech companies.

Her research also focuses on gender, technology, and culture, and how they influence the design and use of the internet. Her work has appeared in academic publications and popular media outlets including Time and Bitch. Noble co-edited the books Emotions, Technology & Design and The Intersectional Internet: Race, Sex, Culture and Class Online. She is the co-editor of the "Commentary & Criticism" section of the journal Feminist Media Studies. Additionally, Noble is a member of several academic journal and advisory boards including for Taboo: The Journal of Culture and Education, and the Journal of Critical Library and Information Studies.

=== Algorithms of Oppression ===
Noble's first book, Algorithms of Oppression, was published by NYU Press in 2018 and has been reviewed in journals including the Los Angeles Review of Books, and was featured in the New York Public Library 2018 Best Books for Adults. It considers how bias against people of color is embedded into supposedly neutral search engines. It explores how racism, especially Anti-Black racism, is generated, maintained, and reproduced by the internet. In it, Noble is concerned with looking at the ways the Black community is commercialized by technology companies. She researches companies like Google and Facebook and considers how their algorithms "black-box" information; for example, when a search term is entered, it is unclear how results for the search are derived. Her work aims to change the perceptions of marginalized people in technology. She blogged about "Digital Infrastructures of Race and Gender" for the Fotomuseum's online platform. She has also given talks and interviews about Algorithms of Oppression.

== Select publications ==
- Joyce, Kelly; Smith-Doerr, Laurel; Alegria, Sharla; Bell, Susan; Cruz, Taylor; Hoffman, Steve G.; Noble, Safiya Umoja; Shestakofsky, Benjamin (2021). "Toward a Sociology of Artificial Intelligence: A Call for Research on Inequalities and Structural Change". Socius. 7 2378023121999581. doi:10.1177/2378023121999581.
- Noble, Safiya Umoja (2018). Algorithms of oppression: how search engines reinforce racism. New York University Press. ISBN 9781479837243. OCLC 1029007986.
- Noble, Safiya U.; Austin, Jeanie; Sweeney, Miriam E.; McKeever, Lucas; Sullivan, Elizabeth (2013). "Changing Course: Collaborative Reflections of Teaching/Taking "Race, Gender, and Sexuality in the Information Professions"". Journal of Education for Library and Information Science. 55 (3): 212–222. ISSN 0748-5786.
- Noble, Safiya U. (15 January 2017). "Google and the Misinformed Public". The Chronicle of Higher Education.

=== Edited volumes ===
- Noble, Safiya Umoja; Tynes, Brendesha M., eds. (2016). The Intersectional Internet Race, Sex, Class, and Culture Online. New York: Peter Lang. ISBN 9781433130014. OCLC 946134246.
- Tettegah, Sharon Y.; Noble, Safiya Umoja, eds. (2016). Emotions, technology, and design. Amsterdam Academic Press. ISBN 9780128018729. OCLC 944209071.
