= Brendesha Tynes =

American psychologist

Brendesha Marie Tynes
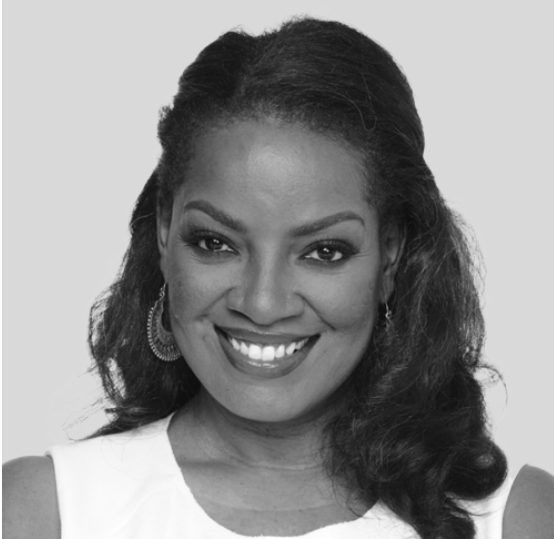
- Education: Columbia University; Northwestern University; University of California, Los Angeles
- Scientific career
- Workplaces: University of Illinois at Urbana-Champaign; USC Rossier School of Education
- Thesis: Towards a textual promised land : youth culture, race and identity on the Internet (2005)

Brendesha Marie Tynes is an American psychologist who is a professor of Psychology and Education at the USC Rossier School of Education. Her research considers how young people engage with social media, and how this influences their socioeconomic and academic outcomes. Tynes is principal investigator on the Teen Life Online and in Schools Project, which studies race-related cyberbullying.

== Early life and education ==
Tynes is from Detroit. Her mother worked for Chrysler. She completed her bachelor's degree in history at Columbia University, then moved to Northwestern University for her graduate studies, where she specialised in learning sciences. Tynes was a graduate student at University of California, Los Angeles, studying the relationship between youth identity and the internet. She was a researcher in the laboratory of Patricia Greenfield, who was investigating the construction of sexual identity online. Tynes has said that her research was inspired by the Kenneth and Mamie Clark. After graduating, Tynes worked as a high school global studies teacher.

== Research and career ==
Tynes studies youth engagement with social media, and how this impacts their academic outcomes. She was the first to identify that adolescents of color were most likely to suffer from online victimization. This victimization can result in increased depressive tendencies and decreased academic motivation. Working with the National Institutes of Health, Tynes studied race-related cyberbullying. Through the development of a risk and resilience framework, Tynes has shown that whilst online interactions can threaten the social identify of adolescents, there are strategies to mitigate this.

Based on her research, Tynes developed a mobile-driven application that helps young people cope with online racial discrimination. The application was evaluated using a randomized control trial. Tynes was the founder of the Digital Equity Project, an investigation into the use of mobile devices in K–12 schools. She showed that the regular exposure to traumatic incidents that involved people of color online can result in poor mental health outcomes.

Tyne joined the University of Michigan as a Visiting associate professor in 2015.

== Awards and honors ==
- 2010 Diverse Magazine Emerging Scholars under 40
- 2012 AERA Early Career Contribution Award
- 2015 Spencer Foundation Midcareer Award
- 2015 American Educational Research Association Early Career Award
- 2022 AERA Fellow

== Selected publications ==
- Subrahmanyam, Kaveri; Greenfield, Patricia M.; Tynes, Brendesha (2004-11-01). "Constructing sexuality and identity in an online teen chat room". Journal of Applied Developmental Psychology. Developing Children, Developing Media - Research from Television to the Internet from the Children's Digital Media Center: A Special Issue Dedicated to the Memory of Rodney R. Cocking. 25 (6): 651–666. doi:10.1016/j.appdev.2004.09.007. ISSN 0193-3973.
- Tynes, Brendesha M. (2007-11-01). "Internet Safety Gone Wild?: Sacrificing the Educational and Psychosocial Benefits of Online Social Environments". Journal of Adolescent Research. 22 (6): 575–584. doi:10.1177/0743558407303979. ISSN 0743-5584. S2CID 145644253.
- Tynes, Brendesha; Reynolds, Lindsay; Greenfield, Patricia M. (2004-11-11). "Adolescence, race, and ethnicity on the Internet: A comparison of discourse in monitored vs. unmonitored chat rooms". Journal of Applied Developmental Psychology. 25 (6): 667–684. doi:10.1016/j.appdev.2004.09.003. ISSN 0193-3973.
- Tynes, B. M., Rose, C., & Williams, D. (2010) The development and validation of the Online Victimization Scale for adolescents. Cyberpsychology: Journal of Psychosocial Research on Cyberspace, 4(2).
- Tynes, B. M., Garcia, E., Giang, M., & Coleman, N. (2011). The racial landscape of social network sites: Forging identity, community & civic engagement. I/S: A Journal of Law and Policy for the Information Society.
- Tynes, B. M., Umaña-Taylor, A., Rose, C., Lin, J., & Anderson, C. (2012). Online racial discrimination and the protective function of ethnic identity and self-esteem for African Americans. Developmental Psychology, 48, 342 – 355.https://doi.org/10.1037/a0027032
- Tynes, B. M., Rose, C., & Markoe, S. (2013). Extending campus life to the internet: Social media, discrimination and perceptions of racial climate. Journal of Diversity in Higher Education.
- Tynes, B. M. & Mitchell, K. (2013). Black youth beyond the digital divide: Age and gender differences in internet use, communication patterns and victimization experiences. Journal of Black Psychology.
- Tynes, B. M., Hiss, S., Rose, C., Umaña -Taylor, A., Mitchell, K. & Williams, D. (2014). Internet use, online racial discrimination, and adjustment among a diverse, school- based sample of adolescents. International Journal of Gaming & Computer Mediated Simulations, 6 (3), 1–16.
- Michikyan, M., Lozada, F., Weidenbenner, J.V.& Tynes, B. M. (2014). Adolescent coping strategies in the face of their “worst online experience”. International Journal of Gaming & Computer Mediated Simulations, 6(4), 1–16.
- Umaña-Taylor, A. J., Tynes, B. M., Toomey, R. B., Williams, D., & Mitchell, K. (2015). Latino adolescents’ perceived discrimination in online and off-line settings: An examination of cultural risk and protective factors. Developmental Psychology, 51(1), 87–100.
- Rose, C. A. & Tynes, B. M. (2015). Longitudinal associations between cybervictimization and mental health among US adolescents. Journal of Adolescent Health.
- Tynes, B. M., Del Toro, J., & Lozada, F. (2015). An unwelcomed digital visitor in the classroom: The longitudinal impact of online racial discrimination on school achievement motivation. School Psychology Review, 44(4), 407–424.
- Tynes, B.M. & Lozada, F. (2017). Longitudinal effects of online experiences on empathy among African American adolescents. Journal of Applied Developmental Psychology, 52, 181–190.
