= Donna Zuckerberg =

American classicist and author (born 1987)

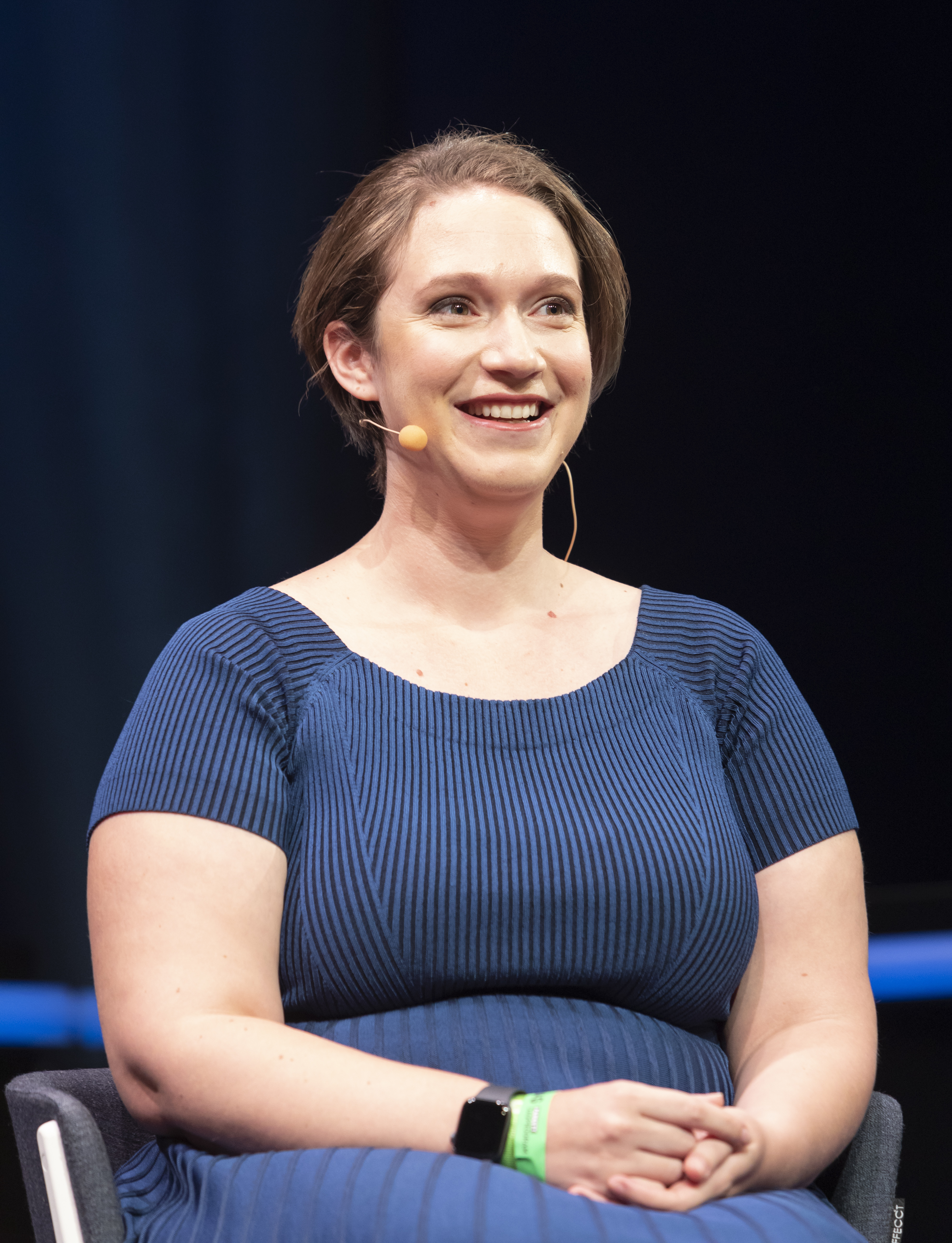
- Zuckerberg at Big Challenge Science Festival
- Born: 1987 (age 38–39); Dobbs Ferry, New York, U.S.
- Occupations: Classicist; author
- Spouse: Harry Schmidt (divorced)
- Children: 2
- Relatives: Mark Zuckerberg (brother); Randi Zuckerberg (sister)

Academic background
- Education: University of Chicago (BA); Princeton University (MA, PhD)
- Thesis: The Oversubtle Maxim Chasers: Aristophanes, Euripides, and their Reciprocal Pursuit of Poetic Identity (2014)
- Doctoral advisor: Andrew Ford

Academic work
- Discipline: Classics
- Sub-discipline: Ancient tragedy

Donna Zuckerberg (born 1987) is an American classicist and author. She is author of the book Not All Dead White Men (2018), about the appropriation of classics by misogynist groups on the Internet. She was editor-in-chief of Eidolon, a classics journal, until its closure in 2020. She is a sister of Facebook co-founder and CEO Mark Zuckerberg.

== Early life and education ==
Zuckerberg was born in Dobbs Ferry, New York, in 1987 to a Jewish family. She is the third of four children. Both parents were doctors. One parent was a dentist and the other was a psychiatrist. She says the family was tight-knit and the parents encouraged their children to develop whatever talents they had. Her siblings Mark Zuckerberg and Randi Zuckerberg both work in the technology sector.

After earning a Bachelor of Arts from the University of Chicago, Zuckerberg earned her Ph.D. in classics at Princeton University in 2014, specializing in the study of ancient tragedy. The title of her doctoral thesis was "The Oversubtle Maxim Chasers: Aristophanes, Euripides, and their Reciprocal Pursuit of Poetic Identity". Her doctoral adviser was Andrew Ford. While completing her graduate studies, Zuckerberg wrote a food blog called "Sugar Mountain Treats".

== Career ==
=== Eidolon and scholarship ===
The classicist Natalie Haynes notes that Zuckerberg "is a classicist with a strong Internet pedigree". Zuckerberg was the founder and editor-in-chief of the online journal Eidolon, which published texts about classics that were not formal scholarship. Its authors included well-established classicists as well as new experts in the field.

Aside from Eidolon, Zuckerberg's work has been published in popular publications, including the Times Literary Supplement, Jezebel, The Establishment, and Avidly. She has also written for mainstream publications about the use of the classics by the alt-right movement. In a 2018 op-ed in The Washington Post, she argued that the sexism and racism found in classic texts should be studied and discussed rather than ignored or, as right-wing ideologues were doing, celebrated. Natalie Haynes agreed with Zuckerberg's ideological stance, arguing that "ignoring these people is no longer the answer".

=== Not All Dead White Men ===
Zuckerberg's monograph, Not All Dead White Men: Classics and Misogyny in the Digital Age, was published by Harvard University Press in October 2018. It has been described as "one of the first books to examine the online formation known as the Red Pill... also known as the manosphere". The "manosphere" includes numerous factions such as men's rights activists, pickup artists, and Men Going Their Own Way. The groups are united by the belief that they are disadvantaged by contemporary society which operates in favor of women. Zuckerberg's book is a reception study. It describes how the Red Pill movement online finds support for its sexist ideology in texts from ancient Greece and Rome, tracing the phenomenon back to its origins and describing its misappropriation of Ovid, Euripides, Xenophon's Oeconomicus and Marcus Aurelius' Meditations. The book touches on the links between the Red Pill community and the white supremacy movement.

The "Red Pill" is a cultural reference to the film The Matrix (1999), where Morpheus (Laurence Fishburne) offers Neo (Keanu Reeves) the choice of the blue or red pill, giving blissful ignorance or gritty, painful truth respectively. Zuckerberg argues that "[t]he red pill metaphor really encapsulates for them [alt-right groups] the fact that they really see their misogyny and racism as a form of enlightenment. They are able to see the world more clearly than the rest of us… and what they see is that white, heterosexual men are discriminated against in our society."

Zuckerberg's book also explores the popularity of stoicism within the manosphere. The book describes how Red Pill men use stoicism to support their belief in a dichotomy between the rational nature of males and the emotional nature of women. Zuckerberg argues that the point of the Red Pill discourse "is not for everything to hang together logically and to be totally immune to criticism. The point is to make people feel something—to make their audience feel validated and justified and scared and angry—and [get] any reaction [out of] them". Zuckerberg takes a feminist approach to classical antiquity, arguing that the ancient world was deeply misogynistic: "it was a time when there was no word for rape, feminism did not exist and women's actions were determined by male relatives". Alt-right groups are using classical texts, distorted and stripped of context, to add weight and authority to campaigns of misogyny and white supremacy.

Zuckerberg's interest in the topic began in 2015 when she realized an article about Ovid in Eidolon saw heavy traffic from the Red Pill community on Reddit. In the same period, she read an interview with Neil Strauss, who mentioned seduction advice by Ovid. That research interest became a magazine article, then a book.

The final draft of her book was submitted days before the 2016 United States elections. It then became relevant outside academia, as the grievances of many of the groups she studied entered the political mainstream at the highest level. Zuckerberg says that while her book was in production, the Red Pill movement started to focus more on policing women's reproductive rights, away from the more traditional "men's rights" issues such as child custody.

=== Critical response ===
The book has been generally well received. Natalie Haynes, Samuel Argyle, and Sarah Bond reviewed it positively, concurring with Zuckerberg's conclusions. In particular, Sarah Bond locates Zuckerberg within "a new generation of classicists, archaeologists, and premodern historians [who] have begun to realize that an insulated approach to scholarship is itself a form of privileged monasticism that we can no longer retreat to". Bond sees the work as shedding light into the crevices of the internet. Rachel O'Neill applauds Zuckerberg's willingness to subject the manosphere to scrutiny, given the lack of scholarship on the topic. It has been described as "a rare book from a university press that will probably be a crossover bestseller in non-academic markets". Matthew J. Sharpe, Associate Professor of Philosophy at Deakin University, has questioned whether Zuckerberg's portrayal of ancient Stoicism is wholly accurate.

=== Criticism of social media ===
Zuckerberg has spoken out against social media, including Facebook, arguing that it has created a toxic culture and given men "with anti-feminist ideas [the opportunity] to broadcast their views to more people than ever before – and to spread conspiracy theories, lies and misinformation". Zuckerberg asserts that social media has elevated misogyny to "entirely new levels of violence and virulence".

=== Honors ===
Zuckerberg was the recipient of the 2017–18 Award for Special Service from the Classical Association of the Middle West and South. Zuckerberg spoke at the Jaipur Literature Festival 2019, where she was in conversation with biographer Patrick French and writer and editor Sharmila Sen.

== Personal life ==
Zuckerberg lives in Silicon Valley with her two children. She was previously married to Harry Schmidt, a software engineer and product strategist at Wildfire.

== Publications ==
=== Monographs ===
- —— (2018). Not All Dead White Men: Classics and Misogyny in the Digital Age. Cambridge, MA: Harvard University Press. ISBN 978-0-674-97555-2.

=== Articles and book chapters ===
- —— (2016). "The Clothes Make the Man: Aristophanes and the Ragged Hero in Euripides' Helen". Classical Philology. 111 (3): 201–223. doi:10.1086/687244.
- —— (2016). "Branding Irony: Comedy and Crafting the Public Persona". In Walsh, Philip (ed.). Brill's Companion to the Reception of Aristophanes. Leiden: Brill. doi:10.1163/9789004324657_009. ISBN 978-90-04-32465-7.
- —— (2018). "The Curious Incident of the Intertextual Debt in the Frogs". Didaskalia. 14 (2). ISSN 1321-4853. Wikidata Q59241127.
