= Léa Clermont-Dion =

Canadian author and feminist

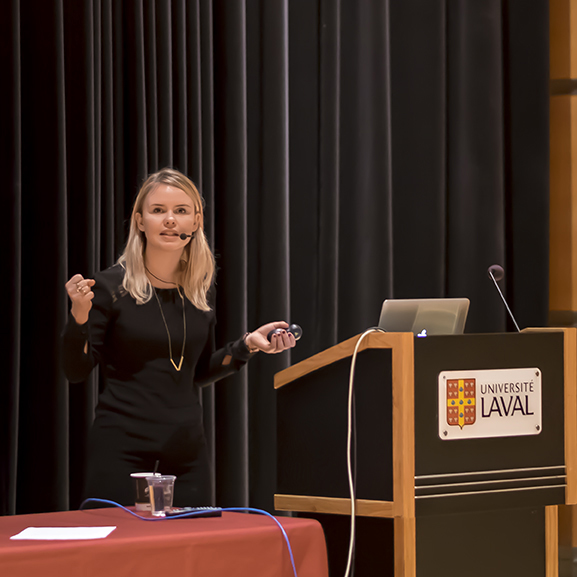
- Léa Clermont-Dion at a conference in 2016
- Born: 5 April 1991 (age 34); Gore, Quebec, Canada
- Occupations: Journalist, author, documentary film-maker, radio host
- Known for: Body image advocacy

Léa Clermont-Dion (born 5 April 1991) is a Canadian author, feminist, television and radio host, and body image advocate. She was a co-facilitator, with Jacinthe Veillette, and spokesperson of the Québec Charter for a Healthy and Diverse Body Image. Clermont-Dion came to public attention during an appearance on the television programme Tout le monde en parle in October 2009. She is a doctoral student in political science at Laval University and the author of La revanche des moches (2014) and Les Superbes (2016).

== Biography ==
After experiencing a health problem related to anorexia nervosa at age 12, Léa Clermont-Dion questioned the pressure put on women by the unachievable media ideal of thin models. In 2006, at age 14, she worked with Cathy Wong to organize a conference of leading feminists at the Université du Québec à Montréal (UQAM) which attracted more than 400 people. The same year she was recruited by the youth committee of the Quebec Council on the Status of Women on which she served from 2006 to 2008.

Clermont-Dion met Jacinthe Veillette, who had a similar body image struggle; together, they wrote a petition that was posted online. The petition was tabled in the National Assembly of Quebec and resulted in a bill: Charte québécoise pour une image corporelle saine et diversifiée (Quebec Charter for a Healthy and Diverse Body Image). It was drawn up by a working committee of about thirty people from the fashion, advertising, media, video, music and government sectors. A unique charter in North America, it was officially released in the fall of 2009. The next spring, an awareness campaign was launched at schools and colleges and on television, radio and the Internet. As a spokesperson for the charter, Clermont-Dion speaks several times a year at schools.

Clermont-Dion was named 2011 Personnalité par Excellence by Forces Avenir, who awarded her a scholarship to aid her undergraduate studies in political science at UQAM. She spent a year at Sciences Po in Paris, earned a bachelor's degree in political science then in 2014 began a master's degree in political science and feminist studies at Laval University.

Clermont-Dion has stated that the new generation of feminism is more individualistic than the movement of the past, and that she has a social democratic vision, that "the feminist struggle is part of a whole, an ideal of society." Not wanting to be associated with a single cause, she has been involved with famine relief, education and environmental movements, and took part in an Oxfam–Québec étudiant sans frontières internship in Burkina Faso.

Clermont-Dion has also tried to create dialog by bringing issues forward creatively, as in her short film Sandra about teenaged prostitution and the photo exhibit "Banfora en 30 visages" which showed empowering portraits of the Green Brigades. Her first book, La revanche des moches (transl. The Revenge of the Uglies), published in 2014, examines the collective obsession with appearance and beauty and brought confirming testimonial from music artist Mitsou. The two joined as co-hosts of feminist documentary series Mitsou et Léa. In 2017 she began working on her first feature-length documentary, Mysogynie 2.0, about sexual harassment on the Internet.

=== Sexual assault allegation ===
On 25 October 2017 Clermont-Dion claimed on her Facebook page to have filed a sexual assault complaint against Michel Venne, journalist and founder of the Institut du Nouveau Monde, for an alleged incident that occurred when he was her boss in the summer of 2008. She was a minor at the time. During 2014–2015 she made a public release about the alleged incident without naming her attacker. Clermont-Dion claimed that Lise Payette, a feminist and columnist, pressured her to sign a retraction as rumours spread, affecting Venne's opportunity to become an editor at Le Devoir. Clermont-Dion claimed to have taken action in 2017 in support of the #MoiAussi movement. Venne denied the allegations on his Facebook page, and suspended his professional activities pending an investigation.

== Works ==
=== Publications ===
- La revanche des moches [The Revenge of the Uglies] (in French). VLB. 2014.
- Les Superbes (in French). 2016.

=== Documentaries ===
- Sandra (short form)
- Beauté fatale
- Janette et filles - Director, co-writer - La Ruelle Films. 2022. (medium-length documentary)
- Backlash: Misogyny in the Digital Age - Co-director with Guylaine Maroist. La Ruelle Films. 2022. [Je vous salue salope: la misogynie au temps du numérique] (French version).
- 2024 : La peur au ventre - Presenter, director, writer - Les Productions d’Octobre inc. 2024. (medium-length documentary)

== Awards and distinctions ==
- Volunteer Award from Bénévolat Québec
- Young Woman of Merit Award, YWCA of Montreal
- College Award for Excellence in Communications
- Millennium National Scholarship
- Avenir Personnalité par Excellence, 2011, from Forces Avenir
- Personality of the Week from La Presse and Radio-Canada
