= Venda people =

Ethnic group in South Africa and Zimbabwe

Vha-Venda
Total population
- +2.5 million

Regions with significant populations
- Collins Chabane Local Municipality, Makhado Local Municipality, Musina Local Municipality, and Thulamela Local Municipality.
- South Africa

Languages
- TshiVenda

Religion
- Christianity, Traditional African religion

Related ethnic groups
- Pedi people

Venda
- Person: MuVenda
- People: VhaVenda
- Language: TshiVenda
- Country: Venda

The Venḓa (VhaVenḓa or Vhangona) are a Bantu people native to Southern Africa living mostly near the South African-Zimbabwean border. The Venda language arose from interactions with Sotho-Tswana and Kalanga groups from 1400.

The Venda are closely associated with the 13th century Kingdom of Mapungubwe where oral tradition holds King Shiriyadenga as the first king of Venda and Mapungubwe. The Mapungubwe Kingdom stretched from the Soutpansberg in the south, across the Limpopo River to the Matopos in the north. The Kingdom rapidly declined around 1300 due to climatic change and the population scattered, as power moved north to the Great Zimbabwe Kingdom. The first Venda settlement in the Soutpansberg was that of the legendary chief Thoho-ya-Ndou (Head of the Elephant). His royal kraal was called D’zata, capital of the Venda Kingdom; its remains have been declared a National Monument. The Mapungubwe Collection is a museum collection of artefacts found at the archaeological site and is housed in the Mapungubwe Museum in Pretoria. Venda people share ancestry with Sotho-Tswana peoples.

== History ==
The Venda of today are Vhangona, Takalani (Ungani), Masingo and others. Vhangona are the original inhabitants of Venda, they are also referred as Vhongwani wapo; while Masingo and others are originally from central Africa and the East African Rift, migrating across the Limpopo river during the Bantu expansion, Venda people originated from central and east Africa, just like the other South African tribes.

=== Clans ===
The Venda of today are descendants of many heterogeneous groupings and clans such as:

- Luvhimbi
- Dzindou Dza Hakhomunala Mutangwe/
  Dzatshamanyatsha
- Dzindou Dza Manenzhe
- Vhafamadi
- Vhadau Vhatshiheni
- Vhadau Vhadamani
- Rambuda
- Vha Ha-Ramavhulela (Vhubvo Dzimauli)
- Vhakwevho
- Vha Ha-Maḓavha (Great Warthogs of Luonde
  who immigrated from Zimbabwe)
- Vhambedzi {Vha ha Tshinyike}
- Vhania
- Vhagoni
- Vhalea
- Gebebe
- Ndou
- Maďou
- Vhasekwa
- Vhaluvhu
- Vhatavhatsindi
- Vhalovhedzi
- VhaMese
- Vha Ha-Nemutudi
- Vhatwanamba
- Vhanzhelele/Vhalembethu
- VhaDzanani
- Vhanyai
- Vhashau
- Vhalaudzi
- Masingo and Rambau
- Runganani (Marungadzi Nndevhelaho)
- Ragwala (Vhathu Vha Thavhani)
- Takalani (Ungani)

Vhadau, Vhakwevho, Vhafamadi, Vhania, Vhalea, and Vhaluvhu were collectively known as Vhangona. The Vhangona and Vhambedzi are considered to be the original inhabitants of Venda and the first people to live there.

The land of Vhangona was later settled by Karanga-Rodzvi clans from Zimbabwe: Vhatwanamba, Vhanyai, Vhatavhatsindi and Vhalembethu. Masingo and Vhalaudzi are late arrivals in Venda.

Venda woman singing about a successful trip to collect stinkbugs.

=== Mapungubwe ===
Mapungubwe was the center of a kingdom with about 5,000 people living at its center. Mapungubwe as a trade center lasted between 1220 and 1300 AD. The people of Mapungubwe mined and smelted copper, iron and gold, spun cotton, made glass and ceramics, grew millet and sorghum, and tended cattle, goats and sheep.

The people of Mapungubwe had a sophisticated knowledge of the stars, and astronomy played a major role not only in their tradition and culture, but also in their day-to-day lives.

Mapungubwe predates the settlements at Great Zimbabwe, Thulamela and Dzata.

=== Venda Royal House ===
The Venda were recognised as a traditional royal house in 2010 and Toni Mphephu Ramabulana was the acting king from 2012-2019. In September 2016 Princess Masindi Mphephu, daughter of Tshimangadzi Mphephu (Venda Chief during 1993–1997), challenged her uncle Ramabulana for the throne. She claimed that she was not considered a candidate because of her sex.

On 14 December 2016, she initially lost this battle in court when the Thohoyandou High Court dismissed the case.

In May 2019, however, the Supreme Court of Appeal overturned the Thohoyandou High Court decision and declared that Toni Mphephu-Ramabulana's appointment as king of the Venda nation was deemed "unlawful". Ramubulana has since appealed this ruling, and as of July 2020 the matter was before the Constitutional Court of South Africa. The Venda have since started advocating for a resolution to the leadership dispute, with community organizations holding discussions about the importance of traditional governance structures and the need for clarity regarding royal succession rules that address gender equality in accordance with South Africa's constitution.

== Notable Venda people ==
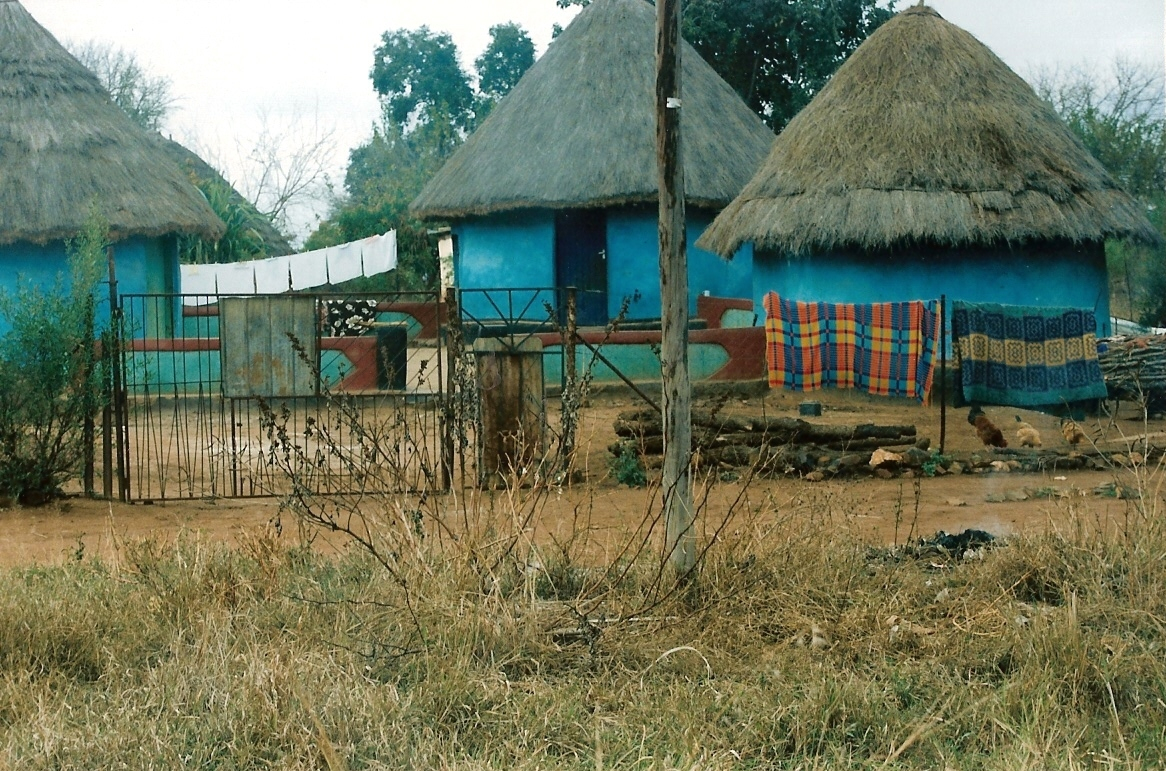
Venda homes.

The following is a list of notable Venda people who have their own Wikipedia articles.

D

- Benedict Daswa, South African school teacher beatified by the Roman Catholic Church
- Mulalo Doyoyo, South African engineer, inventor, and professor

G

- Thomas Gumbu, South African politician

K

- Mmbara Hulisani Kevin, South African politician

L

- Mavhungu Lerule-Ramakhanya, South African politician

Ma-Mp

- Noria Mabasa, Venda artist who works in ceramic and wood sculpture
- E. S. Madima, South African writer
- Tenda Madima, South African writer
- Joe Mafela, South African actor, film director and singer
- Maumela Mahuwa, South African actress
- Makhado, 19th century King of the Venda people
- Milicent Makhado, South African actress
- Rudzani Maphwanya, South African Army officer
- Tshilidzi Marwala, Vice-Chancellor of the University of Johannesburg, South African engineer and computer scientist
- Florence Masebe, South African actress
- Michael Masutha, South African politician
- Rendani Masutha, South African naval officer and former military judge
- Shaun Maswanganyi, South African athlete
- Mark Mathabane, South African tennis player and author of Kaffir Boy
- Eric Mathoho, South African footballer
- Irene Mawela, South African singer, composer and musical arranger
- Kembo Mohadi, Vice President of Zimbabwe
- Patrick Mphephu, first president of the bantustan of Venda

Mu

- Daniel Mudau, South African footballer
- Khuliso Mudau, South African footballer
- Sydney Mufamadi, South African politician
- Fulu Mugovhani, South African actress
- Mukhethwa Mukhadi, South African singer, rapper, producer and director
- Elaine Mukheli, South African singer and songwriter
- Colbert Mukwevho, South African reggae singer
- Gumani Mukwevho, South African politician
- Collen Mulaudzi, South African long-distance runner
- Mbulaeni Mulaudzi, South African middle-distance runner
- Rhoda Mulaudzi, South African footballer
- Rotshidzwa Muleka, South African footballer
- Luvhengo Mungomeni, South African footballer
- Clarence Munyai, South African sprinter
- Marks Munyai, South African footballer
- Tshifhiwa Munyai, South African boxer
- Azwinndini Muronga, South African physicist
- Shudufhadzo Musida, Miss South Africa 2020 winner
- Faith Muthambi, South African politician

N

- Phathutshedzo Nange, South African footballer
- Phillip Ndou, South African boxer
- Lovemore Ndou, South African boxer
- Prince Neluonde, South African lawn bowler
- Fulufhelo Nelwamondo, South African engineer and computer scientist
- Tshilidzi Nephawe, South African basketball player
- Joel Netshitenzhe, South African politician
- Khumbudzo Ntshavheni, South African politician

P

- George Phadagi, South African politician
- Fred Phaswana, South African businessman

R

- Kagiso Rabada, South African cricketer
- Vhambelani Ramabulana, South African politician
- Rodney Ramagalela, South African footballer
- Cyril Ramaphosa, 5th President of the Republic of South Africa
- Gabriel Ramushwana, former head of state of the bantustan of Venda
- Phophi Ramathuba, South African politician and medical doctor
- Rudzani Ramudzuli, South African footballer
- Khume Ramulifho, South African politician
- Ndivhudzannyi Ralivhona, South African musician
- Rasta Rasivhenge, South African rugby union referee
- Frank Ravele, second president of the bantustan of Venda
- Riky Rick, South African rapper, songwriter and actor

T

- Gabriel Temudzani, South African actor
- Dan Tshanda, South African musician
- Mashudu Tshifularo, South African educator and medical specialist
- Jacob Tshisevhe, South African footballer
- Mpho Tshivhase, South African philosopher

== Musangwe ==
Musangwe is a traditional Venda bare-knuckle fist-fighting practice. This combat sport was developed not only for entertainment but also as a means to earn respect among peers. While the Venda culture generally discouraged violence and fighting, musangwe provided a structured outlet for resolving conflicts. When challenged to a fight, participants were obligated to accept or face consequences such as fines or physical punishment administered by community elders. Victors in these contests were typically rewarded with prizes determined by the Khosi (chief) or Vhamusanda (headman).

The matches have no predetermined time limits and conclude only when one combatant concedes defeat. No medical personnel are present during these contests; instead, village elders supervise the fights to ensure adherence to traditional rules that prohibit actions such as biting or kicking. Importantly, gambling on fight outcomes is forbidden and participants compete solely for the honour of representing their village or family rather than material gain.
