= SeaKeys =

Collaborative marine biodiversity project in South Africa

- Type of project: Marine biodiversity
- Country: South Africa
- Key people: Kerry Sink
- Funding: Foundational Biodiversity Information Programme/National Research Foundation

SeaKeys is a large collaborative marine biodiversity project funded through the Foundational Biodiversity Information Program in South Africa. The purpose of the project is to collect and distribute genetic, species and ecosystem information relating to marine biodiversity in southern Africa, which may be used to support informed decision-making about the marine environment.

== Purpose ==
The aim of the project is to collect and make available genetic, species and ecosystem information about Southern African marine biodiversity. This information is expected to be useful to support conservation planning to inform decisions regarding exploitation of marine resources.

=== DNA barcoding ===
There is a known deficit in marine and coastal biodiversity databases for most taxa in South Africa. SeaKeys is part of an effort to change this. A part of the project is to use DNA barcoding of common, invasive, commercially important, rare and endangered marine species to aid estimating species diversity and distributions. The barcodes are accessible through the Barcode of Life Database

== History ==
The project public launch was held at the Iziko South Africa Museum on 18 March 2014.

== Management ==
The SeaKeys project is managed though the South African National Biodiversity Institute marine programme under Dr Kerry Sink.

== Research partners ==
- National Research Institute (NRF) – Research intermediary
- Department of Agriculture Forestry and Fisheries (DAFF)
- Department of Environmental Affairs (DEA) – Department of the South African national government
- South African National Biodiversity Institute (SANBI) – Institution under the South African Department of Environmental Affairs
- Iziko Museums of South Africa – South African national museum in Cape Town
- South African Environmental Observation Network (SAEON) – A network to perform long-term ecological research in South Africa and surrounding waters
- South African Institute for Aquatic Biodiversity (SAIAB) – Centre for the study of aquatic biodiversity in Grahamstown, South Africa
- Oceanographic Research Institute (ORI)
- Nelson Mandela University (NMU) – University in Port Elizabeth, South Africa
- University of Cape Town (UCT) – Public university in Cape Town, South Africa
- University of the Western Cape (UWC) – Public university in Bellville, Cape Town, South Africa
- Stellenbosch University (US) – University in Western Cape, South Africa
- University of KwaZulu-Natal (UKZN) – Public university in KwaZulu-Natal, South Africa
- Ezemvelo KZN Wildlife – South African wildlife conservation organisation
- South African National Parks (SANParks) – Body responsible for managing South Africa's national parks
- WWF Nedbank Green Trust
- Birdlife South Africa
- Southern Underwater Research Group (SURG)

== Citizen science input ==
The citizen science component is a major input for several new biodiversity atlas projects. There are species mapping subprojects which include a fish atlas, a sea slug atlas, an atlas for corals, seafans and anemones, one for jellyfish and an atlas for echinoderms. Citizen science input is largely by way of entering observations supported by an identifiable photograph of the observed organism, along with details of date, location, tentative identification and other information on any one of the web-based platforms associated with the project.

The project uses three web-based platforms to collect marine species observations. SA Jellywatch i-Spot and EchinoMAP (using Google Earth maps or GPS co-ordinates) to create detailed distributions of South African marine species.

Crowdsourced data is provided largely by recreational scuba divers and recreational angling clubs, but a large amount of data is also provided by professional scientists from field observations. A small percentage is sourced from historical photographs, mostly of fish.

Platforms:

- iSpot hosted by the Open University, and Echinomap at the University of Cape Town allow for uploading of photographs of marine organisms along with date and locality information.
- SA Jellywatch at University of the Western Cape records public participation in tracking jellyfish distributions and abundance.
- Most of the data on iSpot was later migrated to iNaturalist when iSpot was found to be unsuitable for the purpose.

== Funding ==
SeaKeys is funded by the National Research Foundation of South Africa through the Foundational Biodiversity Information Programme.
