= Mayihlome News =

South African online political journal

- "Walking the talk"
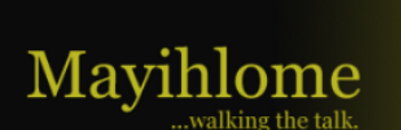
- Type: Political journal
- Format: Online
- Publisher: Musuku Africa (pty)ltd
- Editor-in-chief: Mmbara Hulisani Kevin
- Launched: 2009
- Political alignment: Pan-Africanism
- Language: English
- City: Johannesburg
- Country: South Africa
- Price: Free
- Website: www.mayihlomenews.co.za

Mayihlome News is an online political journal published from South Africa. Mayihlome News was launched in 2009, on a free WordPress platform with Mmbara Hulisani Kevin as Editor in Chief. On 16 February 2015, Mayihlome News moved from the free WordPress platform to a self-hosted platform and registered a unique domain. Mayihlome News also rebranded introducing the Man in the Green Blanket in its branding in honour of the leader of the Marikana Miners who were massacred by South African Police Service on 16 August 2012. A news section on Mayihlome News which was aimed at encouraging community journalism was discontinued due to lack of consistent content. Articles published on Mayihlome News are submitted by "students, workers, struggle veterans, revolutionary academics, historians, cultural activists, social activists and other constituencies involved in the struggle for the emancipation of mankind from the yoke of capitalism in all its forms".

== History ==
=== The Launch ===
Mayihlome News was launched at the Inaugural Mayihlome Lecture at Hotel 224 in Pretoria, South Africa, on 30 May 2009. The lecture was organized by the Pan Africanist Youth Congress, a youth wing of the Pan Africanist Congress of Azania, at the time led by the current editor of Mayihlome News, Mmbara Hulisani Kevin. The Keynote address for the lecture was delivered by the former Pan Africanist Congress of Azania leader Philip Kgosana, popularly known for leading a 30 000 men march in Cape Town at the age of 23 on 30 March 1960. The main lecture was delivered by the former Pan Africanist Youth Congress President, Matome Mashao.

Mayihlome News was launched on the popular WordPress platform and used the blogging capabilities of the platform to publish feature articles whereas news articles and current affairs articles were published in pages format.

=== May 2009 to February 2015 ===
Following the launch Mayihlome News published its first feature article titled "The Epic Story of June 16 Uprising" on 12 June 2009. The article sought to provide facts regarding the 16 June 1976 students protests and the fact that Pan Africanist Congress of Azania leaders led by Zephaniah Mothopeng were prosecuted for these uprising in secret trials known as the "Bethel Trial".

Mayihlome News Editor in Chief: Hulisani Kevin Mmbara

On 13 February 2010 Mayihlome News was invited and participated in the "I Publish What I Like" seminar in Johannesburg hosted by Khanya College and Ebukhosini Solutions in celebration of Africa Month 2010. Mayihlome News Editor Mmbara Hulisani Kevin was part of the panel discussions alongside other black South African publishers like Andile Mngxitama of Frank Talk and Rose Francis of African Perspectives Publishing.

On 8 April 2010 Mayihlome published what would be its last News Article under its News section titled "CHICKENS ARE COMING HOME TO ROOST" which was issued by the Pan Africanist Youth Congress President Linda Kwame Ndebele. The article followed the murder of AWB leader Eugene Terrenblanche who was 'hacked to death at home at home by workers'. The articled called for "rural farm workers to stand up and defend themselves against racists and oppressors like Terreblanche."

On 13 October 2010 one of Mayihlome News contributors and struggle veteran, Khoisan X formerly Benny Alexander, died following a stroke.

Initially, Mayihlome News also featured an Events section and on 16 October 2010 the last event which was the 2nd Mayihlome Lecture was published and the section was discontinued.

Mayihlome News published a modest number of feature articles and news articles between June 2009 and February 2015. A report from 2012 indicated that in the year 2012 only 24 feature articles, a modest 40,000 views from around 160 countries. The number 24 on feature articles excluded news articles and current affairs articles.

In 2013 Mayihlome News grew modestly with 36 feature articles, 72 000 views and visits from 171 countries.

In 2014 Mayihlome News published 36 feature articles and attracted 82 000 views with visits from 175 countries.

=== February 2015 to Present ===
On 16 February 2015 Mayihlome News moved to a self-hosted WordPress platform and started using the domain www.mayihlomenews.co.za. In this move sections of Mayihlome News were phased out including Events and News.

At the height of the #FeesMustFall movement led by students from a number of universities in South Africa, Mayihlome News published a number feature articles offering a pan-africanist perspective on the student fees and decolonization issue. On the evening of 21 October 2015 Mayihlome News team joined the students at Wits University as per pictures posted on Mayihlome News Facebook Page.

Mayihlome News published its first poem on 24 September 2016 with a poem by struggle veteran Jaki Seroke titled "Sing Sibongile".

On 9 February 2017 Mayihlome News published its first cartoon by its resident cartoonist Thapelo Baloyi.

The Inaugural Mayihlome Lecture keynote speaker and PAC Veteran, Phillip Kgosana, died on 20 April 2017. Phillip Kgosana was well known for leading "30,000 African demonstrators who marched into the centre of Cape Town on 30 March" following the Sharpville Massacre.

== Political Alignment ==
Mayihlome News is "committed to democratic principles of self-determination, equality, justice, common ownership of the means of economic production, equitable sharing of wealth creation and consumption and an end to exploitation of man by man for the benefit of the few at the expense of the sweat, toil and blood of the working class masses. Ours is a cause for the creation of a socialist society". Mayihlome News is also notably Pan-African in content and also due to the fact that it was launched out of the Pan Africanist Youth Congress and Pan Africanist Congress of Azania programmes.

== Top Articles ==
Year	Article	Author
2012	"The ANC of today is only 57 years not 100 years"	Dr. Motsoko Pheko
2013	"The Mandela Deception"	Yamkela Fortune Spengane
2014	"EUROPE IS BLACKMAILING AFRICA TO GO HOMOSEXUAL!"	Dr. Motsoko Pheko
2015	"The Mandela Deception"	Yamkela Fortune Spengane
2016	"The violent shall take it by force" – Thoughts on the Student Movement	Dzumbu Mmbara
2017	"QUESTIONS AND ANSWERS ON SOUTH AFRICA’S NATIVE LAND ACT 1913"	Dr. Motsoko Pheko

== Mayihlome Lectures ==
=== 1st Mayihlome Lecture ===
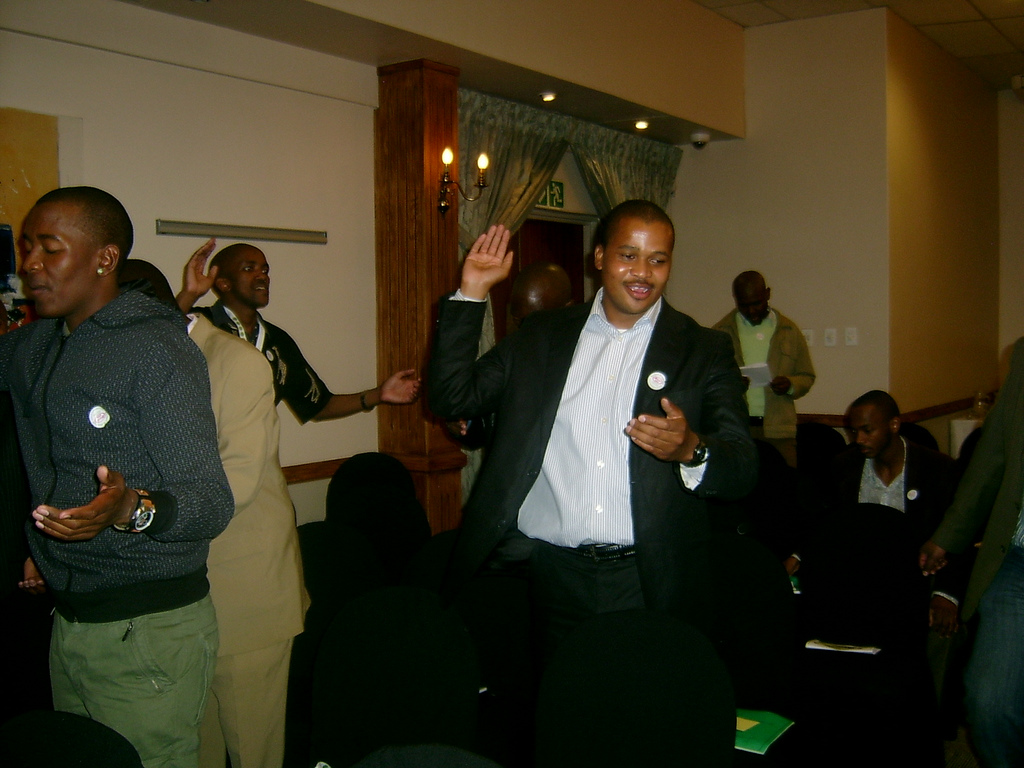
Guests singing at the Inaugural Mayihlome Lecture, Hotel 224, Pretoria.

Mayihlome News was launched at the 1st Mayihome Lecture on 30 May 2009 at Hotel 224, Pretoria. The Keynote address was given by the former Pan Africanist Congress of Azania leader and struggle veteran, Philip Kgosana. The main lecture was delivered by the former Pan African youth Congress President Matome Mashao.

=== 2nd Mayihlome Lecture ===
The second Mayihlome Lecture was held at Central University of Technology,(Welkom Campus), Free State on 30 October 2010 under the theme "The Struggle for Economic Liberation in Neocolonial Times”. The keynote address was delivered by renowned "Policy analyst, social entrepreneur, senior executive, thought leader and social activist", Liepollo Lebohang Pheko.
