= Nyakane Tsolo =

South African anti-apartheid activist (1939–2002)

Michael Nyakane Tsolo
- Born: 24 July 1939; Kroonstad
- Died: November 2002 (aged 63)
- Occupation: Anti-apartheid activist
- Spouse: Gladys Qabukile Nzimande-Tsolo
- Children: 2

Michael Nyakane Ramabele Tsolo (24 July 1939, Kroonstad – November 2002) was an anti-apartheid activist, and leader of the Sharpeville branch of the Pan Africanist Congress in South Africa. He and his brother Job Tsolo, led the anti-pass protest to the Sharpeville police station in 21 March 1960, which culminated in the Sharpeville massacre when police opened fire on the crowd.

Tsolo died of stroke in 2002. His political legacy is less known than that of his contemporary PAC leaders, Robert Sobukwe and Philip Kgosana.

== Early life ==
Nyakane Tsolo was the sixth child of Lisebo and Philemon Thokoane Tsolo. He was born in Kroonstad where he grew up until he moved to Sharpeville when he was seven years old. He attended the Sedibe Primary School and obtained his Junior Certificate at Legoshang Secondary School in 1958. He worked as a laborer at African Cables, where he became a trade unionist at the age of 20.

== Politics ==
Nyakane, alongside his elder brother Job Tsolo and Suzan Tshukudu (Adelaide Tambo’s sister), played a key role in founding the Sharpeville PAC branch in 1959, where he went on to serve as branch secretary.

On 21 March 1960, Nyakane led the Positive Action Campaign Against Pass Laws march in Sharpeville Township., as part of PAC's nation-wide campaign that was planned and led by Robert Sobukwe then president of PAC. By midday, around 3,000 people had gathered outside the Sharpeville police station. Nyakane attempted to negotiate with the police, demanding to be arrested after which the crowd would disperse as planned. However, Sergeant Wessels, the officer in charge, declined, claiming he lacked the authority and that the cells were already full.

Around 1:00 PM, Nyakane made another attempt to speak with the police. By then, Colonel "Att" Spengler, a notorious police officer, had arrived. Spengler demanded that the PAC leaders call off the protest, warning that if they failed to do so, the police should fire warning shots over the crowd. He instructed Nyakane and his colleagues to tell the people to disperse, but Nyakane responded that only Robert Sobukwe had the authority to issue such an order. Spengler immediately arrested Tsolo. As news of his arrest spread, the crowd demanded to be arrested as well. Tensions escalated, stones were thrown at the police. According to Lieutenant Colonel Pienaar, he had ordered the police to load their rifles and await his command, however, a policeman panicked and without warning began shooting, after which other policeman also shot into the crowd. A total of 168 police officers fired 1,344 rounds into the crowd, killing 69 people and injuring 180 others.

Nyakane was swiftly imprisoned, and that evening, police raided his home but found nothing of significance. He was detained at No. 4 of the Fort Prison for a year, during which he endured brutal torture at the hands of security police. After a year, he was brought to trial with a small group of PAC leaders, facing charges of incitement and public violence, where he was released on bail. Nyakane fled to Maseru, Lesotho, where a small group of PAC supporters attempted to establish a new headquarters. He later traveled to Cairo, receiving military training from the Egyptian special forces. His exile continued in East Germany and then in Rotterdam, Netherlands, where he represented the PAC and worked with local anti-apartheid organizations. Tsolo returned briefly to South Africa in 1991 and stood as a PAC candidate in the 1994 elections. He remained in Rotterdam until returning home permanently in 2001.

== Illness and death ==
Nyakane died of stroke in November 2022 and was buried at Sharpeville.
