= Duthuni =

- Location within Limpopo Location within South Africa
- Coordinates: 22°58′20″S 30°22′50″E
- Country: South Africa
- Province: Limpopo
- District: Vhembe
- Municipality: Thulamela

Area
  - Total: 6.70 km^{2} (2.59 sq mi)

Population (2011)
  - Total: 6,345
  - Density: 947/km^{2} (2,450/sq mi)

Racial makeup (2011)
  - Black African: 99.9%
  - White: 0.1%

First languages (2011)
  - Venda: 97.1%
  - Other: 2.9%
- Time zone: UTC+2 (SAST)

Duthuni is a village in the Tshivhasa Region of the former Venda in Limpopo Province in South Africa. The Chief of Duthuni is Khosi Vho-Ndwamato Ligege. The Tshivhasa Tea Plantation is located in this village, so is Tshitaka tsha Vhutanda. Some of the people from this village include Ampfarisaho Mulefu, private equity business investor Sam Nematswerani, former Bafana Bafana sports doctor Ephraim Nematswerani as well as Professors Alfred Nevhutanda, Tshilidzi Marwala, and Azwinndini Muronga.

Duthuni Farm and Projects is a livestock and vegetable farm designed both to function as a small farm, but as an agricultural plant hire and a consultancy.

Schools that are found in Duthuni include Ligege secondary school, Tshivhambe primary school and Ratshiendana senior primary school.
