= Mbilwi Secondary School =

Public Secondary School in Sibasa, South Africa

Information
- Established: 1978; 48 years ago

Mbilwi Secondary School is a school in the town of Sibasa in Limpopo, South Africa.

Mbilwi Secondary School has been producing 100% pass rates for its matric students since 1994. The school also produces over 90% of matric exemptions since 1997.. It is known for being a maths and science school.

== History ==
It is a public school that started in 1978. It did not have a proper science laboratory until 2003.

== Notable alumni ==
- Phophi Ramathuba (born 1973), political leader in the Department of Health at the Limpopo Province
- Mashudu Tshifularo (born 1964), educator and medical specialist
- Mulalo Doyoyo (born 1970), engineer, polymathic inventor, and professor
- Tshilidzi Marwala (born 1971), mechanical engineer, computer scientist, former Vice-Chancellor and Principal of the University of Johannesburg, Rector of the United Nations University and Under Secretary General.
- Azwinndini Muronga, Dean of Science at the Nelson Mandela Metropolitan University
- Fulufhelo Nelwamondo (born 1982), electrical engineer and research scientist
- Khumbudzo Ntshavheni (born 1977), Minister of Small Business Development in the Republic of South Africa
