= Rendani =

Rendani may refer to:

- Rendani Masutha, (-2018), South African naval officer
- Rendani Airport, Manokwari, West Papua, Indonesia
