= Kerry Sink =

South African marine biologist

- Education: University of Natal; University of Cape Town
- Scientific career
- Fields: Marine biology
- Workplaces: South African National Biodiversity Institute; Nelson Mandela University
- Thesis: A hierarchical analysis of abiotic determinants and harvesting impacts in the rocky intertidal communities of KwaZulu-Natal (2001)

Kerry Sink is a South African marine biologist who assists in government planning, policy, and management in the marine environment. Her research informs the development of ocean zoning plans and marine protected areas.

== Career ==
Sink is a marine conservation practitioner who has built and managed the Marine Programme at the South African National Biodiversity Institute since 2006. She has since led the WWF-funded Offshore Marine Protected Area (OMPA) project which has been advanced through the government and increased South Africa's MPA from 0.5% to 5%.

Sink set up the SeaKeys project which aims to utilize collaboration to increase marine biodiversity information and translate the information into tangible products that mirror the decision making and development of additional benefits for South African society. She is a co-director and executive team member of the One Ocean Hub and the Principal Investigator of the NFR funded Deep Connections Project. She served as lead of the Deep Connections project team, a short film honoring South Africa coastal and marine life, which unveiled their findings at World Oceans Day.

== Publications ==
Sink is a researcher associate at the Institute for Coastal and Marine Research at Nelson Mandela University. She has produced and coordinated a number of publications, including the Marine and Coastal Component Report of the 2011 National Biodiversity Assessment and launching the biodiversity and mining guidelines with increased pressure on the marine environment from oil and mineral exploitation.

== Awards ==
- 2015 recipient of the Society for Conservation Biology's Edward T. LaRoe III Memorial Award for her outstanding leadership in mainstreaming biodiversity conservation research.
- 2017 WWF Living Planet Award for her contribution to decisive government planning, policy, and management in the marine environment.
