= Ihron Rensburg =

Academic leader in South Africa

Vice-chancellor of University of Johannesburg
- In office 1 January 2006 – 31 December 2017
- Succeeded by: Tshilidzi Marwala

Personal details
- Spouse: Sizeka Rensburg
- Children: 1
- Education: Rhodes University; Stanford University
- Profession: Professor

Ihron Rensburg is a South African leader who served as Vice-Chancellor and Principal of the University of Johannesburg. He completed his undergraduate degree from Rhodes University and a Ph.D. in International Development Education from Stanford University. He received an honorary doctorate from the University of the West Indies.

Rensburg is the Chairperson of both the South Africa UNESCO National Commission and the READ Foundation. He was a Commissioner of South Africa's first National Planning Commission and chaired the working group on Social Protection and Human Capabilities. In the 1980s he was the General Secretary of South Africa's (anti-apartheid) National Education Crisis Committee.

Rensburg was instrumental in the merger of the former Rand Afrikaans University, the Technikon Witwatersrand, and the Soweto and East Rand campuses of Vista University to form UJ. This merger represented a significant move towards inclusivity and diversity in South Africa's higher education system. For which he was rewarded very well
