= Fulufhelo Nelwamondo =

South African electrical engineer

Fulufhelo Vincent Nelwamondo
- Fulufhelo Nelwamondo
- Born: 1982 (age 43–44); Lwamondo, Venda, Limpopo Province, South Africa
- Education: University of the Witwatersrand; Harvard University
- Known for: Artificial intelligence Missing data Information security
- Awards: Order of Mapungubwe in Silver
- Scientific career
- Fields: Electrical Engineering
- Workplaces: University of Johannesburg; Council for Scientific and Industrial Research
- Thesis: Computation intelligence techniques for missing data imputation (2008)
- Doctoral advisor: Tshilidzi Marwala
- Website: whoswho.co.za/fulufhelo-nelwamondo-6803

Fulufhelo Vincent Nelwamondo (OMS) is an electrical engineer by training, and holds a PhD in Electrical Engineering (Computational Intelligence) from the University of the Witwatersrand, in South Africa. He is the youngest recipient of the Harvard-South Africa Fellowship Programme amongst other honours. His research and practical experience has covered a wide spectrum of areas, including software engineering and computational intelligence. His interests include biometrics-based systems, data mining and machine learning tools.

== Early life and career ==
Nelwamondo was born in 1982 in Lukau village, within the greater Lwamondo Village in Venda, Limpopo province, South Africa. He attended Belemu Primary School and matriculated at Mbilwi Secondary School. He was awarded a bursary by Eskom to study electrical engineering at the University of the Witwatersrand, Johannesburg, obtaining his BEng(Electrical) in 2005. He was accredited by the Engineering Council of South Africa in 2006 and obtained his PhD in 2008 under supervision of Tshilidzi Marwala.

Nelwamondo is the chief executive officer of the National Research Foundation of South Africa. Nelwamondo joined the Modelling and Digital Science unit (MDS) of the CSIR in 2008, and became acting director in 2014 and executive director in 2016; prior to 2008 he had been a principal researcher and a competence area manager for Information Security.

He was awarded a postdoctoral fellowship at Harvard University for 2008–2009 as part of the Harvard Centre for African Studies' South African Fellowship Programme, becoming the youngest recipient of the Harvard-South Africa Fellowship Programme.

In November 2011 he was listed as a Senior Member of the IEEE. He is a visiting professor at the University of Johannesburg (UJ) and was listed as a Promising Young Researcher in UJ's list of NRF-rated researchers. He is a founding board member of the South African Young Academy of Science.

In 2011, the South African breakfast cereal manufacturer Pioneer Foods conducted an interview with Nelwamondo as part of a series of advertisements celebrating South African achievers and the breakfast cereal ProNutro.

== Awards ==
In addition to a number of CSIR awards, Newlamondo has been awarded the following, inter alia:

- In 2017, President Jacob Zuma awarded the Order of Mapungubwe in Silver to Nelwamondo for "his excellent contribution to the field of science, particularly electrical engineering. He serves as an enormous inspiration to young people in South Africa."
- In 2016 the Operations Research Society of South Africa (ORSSA) awarded Nelwamondo a Category III Recognition Award, granted to a non-member of the ORSSA for outstanding contributions over a long period of time.
- At the 2009/10 National Science and Technology Forum awards, he was awarded the National Research Foundation–sponsored TW Kambule award for a distinguished black male researcher over the last 2-5 years.
- Nelwamondo featured in the Mail & Guardian 200 Young South Africans in 2008, 2010 and 2012.

== Conferences and journals ==
Nelwamondo was an editor and a reviewer for a number of international journals and in programme committees of several international conferences. He has published over 100 research papers in peer-reviewed journals (such as the SAIEE), conferences and book chapters. Some of the conferences in which he has participated include:

- Fourth International Conference on Machine Learning and Applications (2008)
- International Conference on Cloud and Green Computing (2012)
- First Deep Learning Indaba In South Africa, (2017)
