= Megan Jill Russell =

Biomedical engineer who designed an artificial larynx

- Education: University of Cape Town; University of the Witwatersrand
- Known for: artificial larynx
- Scientific career
- Fields: Electrical Engineering; Biomedical Engineering
- Workplaces: University of the Witwatersrand; University of Johannesburg
- Thesis: Towards speech recognition using palato-lingual contact patterns for voice restoration (2011)
- Doctoral advisors: David Rubin; Tshilidzi Marwala; Brian Wigdorowitz

Megan Jill Russell is a biomedical and electrical engineer based in Johannesburg, South Africa. She is popularly known for inventing an artificial larynx which was featured by MIT Technology Review, but perhaps more importantly, she is involved in the development of methods of computer-assisted detection of tuberculosis.

== Education ==
Russell was born into a scientific family. Her father and two brothers are engineers and her mother a chemist. She was given further inspiration to study in the sciences when she received a hand-written letter from James Watson (of DNA fame) in her final year at school. She studied at the University of Cape Town and completed her BSc in Electrical Engineering followed by an MSc in Biomedical engineering in 2007. Her masters project involved the development an automated microscope with a built-in digital camera to assist in the detection of tuberculosis (TB). She completed her PhD in biomedical engineering at the University of the Witwatersrand in 2011.

From 2012 she has lectured at the faculty of engineering and the built environment of the University of Johannesburg and was an ambassador of their Women in Engineering and the Built Environment project. One of her first post-graduate projects was a mobile laboratory allowing for the testing for TB, CD4 counts (for HIV) and blood-glucose levels (for diabetes).

== Tuberculosis detection ==
Tuberculosis can be detected by lung x-rays but requires skilled interpretation of the x-rays. Computer assisted detection (CAD) can assist where there is a shortage of skilled x-ray interpreters. Russel was involved in the development of a CAD system at the University of the Witwatersrand using a mathematical modelling technique called autoregressive-moving-average.

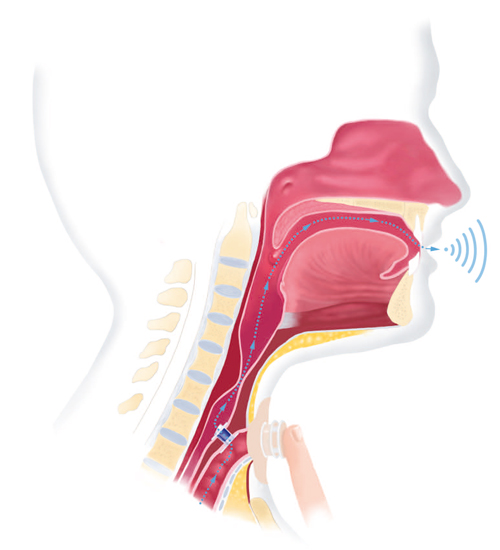
Typical voice prothesis

== Artificial larynx ==
Russell developed a tongue-tracking artificial larynx which is used to facilitate speech in patients who have had a laryngectomy, often as a result of cancer. This was not the first such device to have been invented, although many such devices are not ideal solutions as the patients who use them still have difficulty speaking.

Russel's device detects the position of the tongue against the palate using a system manufactured by two companies called Logometrix and Complete Speech. The customised palatometer detects the tongue position during speech. This information is fed to a machine learning algorithm that interprets what the patient is saying and a voice synthesiser produces the speech.

According to Russell, the system can recognise 50 words and identifies the correct word 94.14% of the time but also skips words that it can't identify 18% of the time.

The intention in 2009 was to miniaturise the system, which at that time was linked to a desktop PC.

== Selected publications ==
- Megan J. Russell, D. M. Rubin, B. Wigdorowitz, T. Marwala. 2008, The Artificial Larynx: A Review of Current Technology and a Proposal for Future Development. 14th Nordic-Baltic Conference on Biomedical Engineering and Medical Physics Volume 20 of the series IFMBE Proceedings pp 160–163
- Megan J. Russell, Andre Nel, T. Marwala, 2012, ARMA Analysis of Chest X-rays for Computer Assisted Detection of Tuberculosis World Congress on Medical Physics and Biomedical Engineering, Beijing, China.
- Russell, Megan J.; Douglas, Tania S. (2007). "Evaluation of autofocus algorithms for tuberculosis microscopy". 2007 29th Annual International Conference of the IEEE Engineering in Medicine and Biology Society. Vol. 2007. pp. 3489–92. doi:10.1109/IEMBS.2007.4353082. ISBN 978-1-4244-0787-3. PMID 18002748. S2CID 21647520.
