= Xaba Sbusiso =

South African politician

Sbusiso Xaba
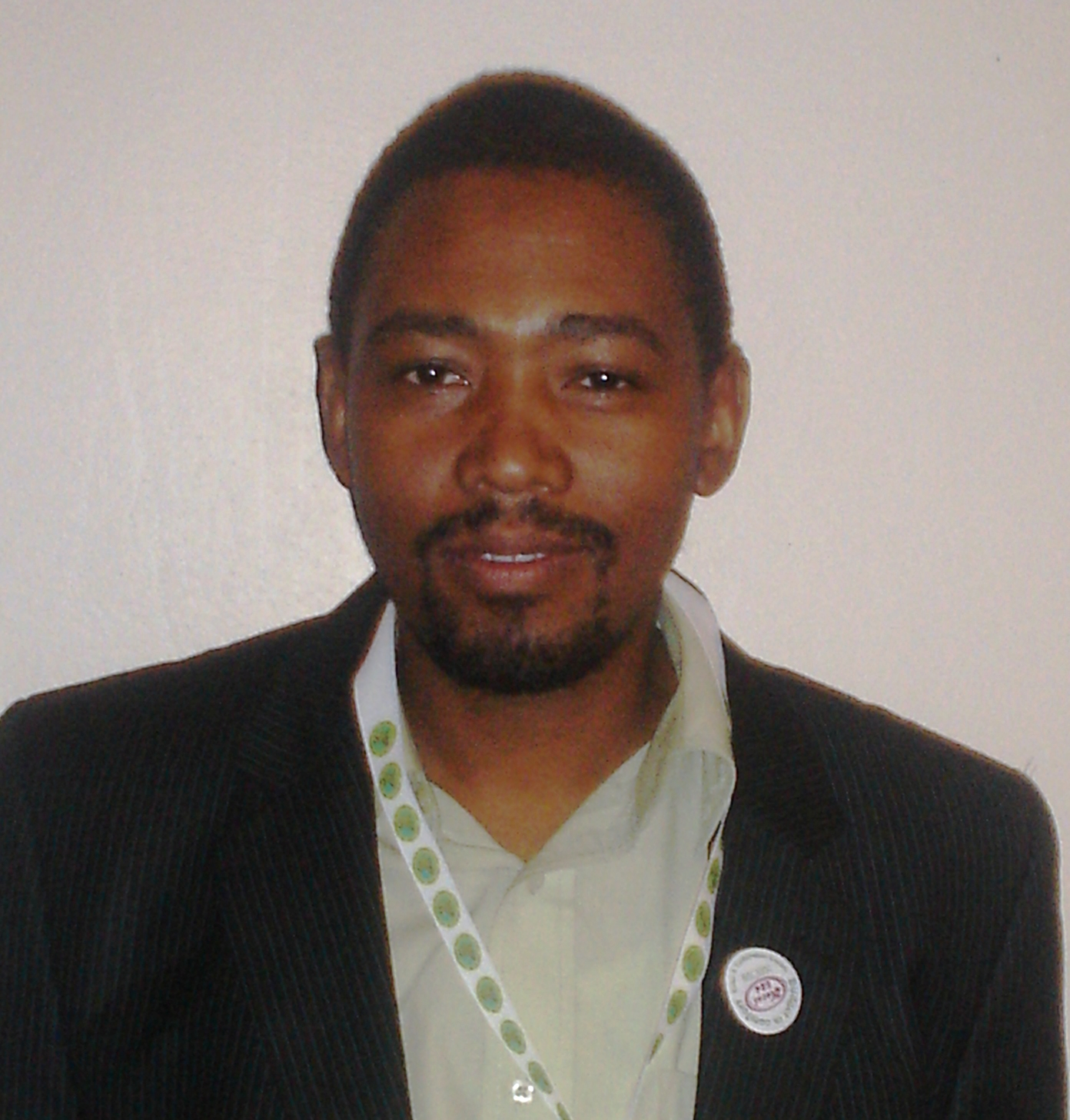

President of PAYCO
- In office 2005–2007
- Preceded by: Mashao Matome
- Succeeded by: Mmbara Hulisani Kevin

Secretary General of PAYCO
- In office 2003–2005
- Preceded by: Brenda Ndlovu
- Succeeded by: Mmbara Hulisani Kevin

Personal details
- Born: 10 June 1973 (age 53)
- Party: Pan Africanist Congress, Pan Africanist Youth Congress of Azania

Sbusiso Xaba is the national chairman of Pan Africanist Congress of Azania from 2019. He was elected in PAC Mangaung National Congress and re-elected in 2022 Polokwane Congress .

== Early life ==
Sbusiso attended Thomas More College (South Africa) in 1992.

Thereafter he attended his tertiary education at the University of Johannesburg (Former Technikon Witwatersrand, where he got engaged in politics through Pan Africanist Student Movement (PASMA) then PASO, as a student activist.

== Politics ==
=== Background ===
Sbusiso served in the International Central Committee of the African Socialist International. He has served as member of the National Executive Council and National Working Committee of Pan Africanist Congress of Azania, President of Pan Africanist Youth Congress and Member of Technikon Witwatersrand Student General Council.

In 2007, as president of PAYCO, Sbusiso travelled to Zimbabwe for the Southern Africa Pan African Youth Summit in Zimbabwe.

He served an interim chairman of Johannesburg Region in the PAC of Azania in 2007 and then chaired the Tshwane Region from 2011 to 2014. This was before being elected to the position of Deputy President.

=== Student activism ===
Student activism through Student Chapter of the Black Management Forum, Pan Africanist Student Organisation and Pan Africanist Student Movement (PASMA) of Azania has deeply involved Sibusiso in the struggle for broad transformation of pedagogy and epistemology in institutions of learning in order for them to be accessible to the African working class, improve quality of content, endorse socialist values and espouse African oriented curriculum.

It is in pursuit of uncontaminated education that he is involved in lobbying Southern African Universities and Governments to introduce African Studies in mainstream education system. He is tasked with duty of directing the reparations work through the World Tribunal on Reparations for Africa and African People.

=== PAYCO presidency ===
Sbusiso was elected president of PAYCO in 2005

Sbusiso, as president of PAYCO, on the eve of the 16 June commemoration in 2006 called on the then president of the Republic of South Africa, Thabo Mbeki, to create the Youth Ministry which will have a sole mandate of attending to youth affairs, this is the official position of PAYCO. In this call he also highlighted the failure of youth structures such as the New York City and UYF.

Sbusiso, as president, also participated in local and national discourses. One of the major issues was that of Name change, were the ruling ANC was changing the names of towns and streets. However, in Kwazulu-Natal the ANC decided it was premature to be preoccupied with name changes in that province. Sbusiso, spoke again the position of the ANC claiming that it was South Africans' responsibility to ensure "that everlasting monuments of our heroes are built through infrastructure naming and our real identity comes through the names of our towns and cities".

While a president for PAYCO Sbusiso continued to have interest in student activism. His engagement in student issues was mostly through Pan Africanist Student Movement of Azania (PASMA), he every now and then commenented and got involved directly. After the 2006 South African National Matriculation Exam results release, Sbusiso hinted the need for students to be taught "in the language of their choice".

On 11 and 12 November 2006 Sbusiso, as president of PAYCO, attended the African People's Solidarity Day in Philadelphia, PA. In this event, Sbusiso was also a speaker. He opened his presentation by quoting Nigerian leader Nnamdi Azikiwe, "we are independent in everything, neutral in nothing", stating that in the African struggle, there is no middle ground between liberation and imperialist imposed violence; "We are faced with two options, democracy and terror…democracy is not elections, it is not even the right to speak…democracy is power, democracy is power lying the right hands…"

Sibusiso opened his last Congress as President of PAYCO, in 2007 at Durban where the new leadership of PAYCO was elected. In this congress, Under theme "Mobilizing Youth Power to Build Socialism and African Unity","emphasised the need to strengthen our African working class movement to wrestle power from imperialist forces by being involved in all matters affecting Africa and Africans everywhere."

=== African Socialist International (ASI) ===
Sbusiso is a member of the International Central Committee of the African Socialist International. Sbusiso, as PAYCOpresident, hosted the president of African Socialist International(ASI), Chairman Omali Yeshitela, in his tour to South Africa.

== Other activities ==
=== Professional memberships ===
Sbusiso has been a member of various professional bodies including the Southern African Institute of Industrial Engineering, International Council on Systems Engineering, Gauteng Board of Black Management Forum and Estate Agency Affairs Board.

=== Business operations ===
He also operated at corporate level of companies in steel manufacturing, retail and communication sectors. He is involved in leadership of various worker controlled commercial initiatives operating in Azania and Zimbabwe with interest in facility management, property, logistics, risk management, management consultancy and micro-enterprise finance.

=== Community services ===
Sbusiso served as a member of Community Policing Forum that is tasked with community oversight of South African Police Service with intention of stopping police corruption, prevention of police brutality, ensuring fair distribution of resource with conscious bias to working class areas and combat crimes directed to the African workers.

Sbusiso is and has been involved in protracted campaigns against evictions in various informal settlements with the City of Johannesburg and City of Tshwane.

== Controversies ==
=== The memorandum against the "US retaliatory strikes in Afghanistan" ===
In October 2001, as a provincial organizer for PAYCO in Gauteng,"Leading about 2000 protesters, who converged on the Union Buildings in Pretoria, Payco provincial organiser Sibusiso Xaba handed the memorandum to Foreign Affairs spokesman Ronnie Mamoepa". The memorandum was against the "US retaliatory strikes in Afghanistan", one of the wars against terrorism by America in Afghanistan.

=== "Cost of freedom vs cost of submission" ===
In a document prepared for TalkZimbabwe titled "Cost of freedom vs cost of submission", Sbusiso writes on the freedom and self-determination of African people. But it is in the same documents where he called multi-national bodies like the United Nations Security Council "imperialist clubs".

In the same document Sbusiso claims that "It has been for 3,000 years that integrationists among African leadership have condemned African people to slavery."

== Education ==
Sbusiso holds the following qualifications:

- MSc: Technology Management (University of Pretoria)
- BSc(Hons): Applied Science (University of Pretoria)
- BTech: Industrial Engineering (University of Johannesburg)
- National Diploma: Industrial Engineering (University of Johannesburg)
- National Technical Certificate (Johannesburg Technical College)

Preceded by Mashao Matome	President of PAYCO; 2005–2007	Succeeded by Mmbara Hulisani Kevin
Preceded by Brenda Ndlovu	Secretary-General of PAYCO; 2003–2005	Succeeded by Mmbara Hulisani Kevin
