= Fred Phaswana =

South African businessman (born 1944)

- Born: Tshamano Mohau Frederik Phaswana; July 1944 (age 82)
- Education: University of South Africa
- Occupations: Joint chairman, Mondi; Chairman, Standard Bank Group; Chairman, South African Institute of International Affairs
- Board member of: Mondi; Standard Bank Group; South African Institute of International Affairs; Naspers

Tshamano Mohau Frederik Phaswana (born July 1944) is a South African businessman, the joint chairman of Mondi since June 2013, chairman of Standard Bank Group and Standard Bank of South Africa, chairman of the South African Institute of International Affairs and non-executive director of Naspers.

== Early life ==
Tshamano Mohau Frederik Phaswana was born in July 1944. Phaswana has bachelor's and master's degrees from University of South Africa (Unisa).

== Career ==
Phaswana has been joint chairman of Mondi since June 2013, chairman of Standard Bank Group and The Standard Bank of South Africa, chairman of the South African Institute of International Affairs and non-executive director of Naspers.

Phaswana is the honorary president of the Cape Town Press Club.

== Personal life ==
Phaswana lives in Belgium.
