= Mmbara Hulisani Kevin =

South African politician

Hulisani Kevin Mmbara

President of PAYCO
- In office Oct 2007 – Nov 2009
- Vice President: Sipho Nkala
- Preceded by: Xaba Sbusiso
- Succeeded by: Ndebele Linda

Secretary General of PAYCO
- In office 2005–2007
- Preceded by: Xaba Sbusiso
- Succeeded by: Ndebele Linda

Chief Editor of Mayihlome News
- In office May 2009 – present

Personal details
- Born: 3 June 1979 (age 46) Phiphidi, South Africa
- Party: Pan Africanist Congress, Pan Africanist Youth Congress of Azania

Mmbara Hulisani Kevin (born 1979) is the former president of PAYCO, a youth wing of PAC in South Africa. Hulisani made news headlines when he took a defiant stance against Letlapa Mphahlele, even going to the extent of calling for his resignation.

== Early life ==
Hulisani was born in the former homeland of Venda, in South Africa, in 1979.

In high school, Hulisani became the president of the SRC of Guvhukuvhu High School in the village of Phiphidi in the former Venda. His stay at the helm of the SRC was marked by a renewed politicization of students.

== Politics ==
=== Background ===
It is not clear when Hulisani became a member of the PAC and PAYCO in particular.

Before serving as the president of PAYCO, Hulisani held positions within the ranks of the party, including its student wing, PASMA and its branches. He also served as the Secretary General of PAYCO before becoming President.

Hulisani opposed the floor-crossing policy, championed and legislated by the ANC government, which allowed party representatives in parliament to move to another party while keeping their seats in parliament.

Hulisani also worked as a researcher for the Limpopo legislature in 2003, working with Maxwel Nemadzivhanani, then provincial chairman of PAC in Limpopo Province.

=== PAYCO Presidency ===
At a PAYCO national congress held in Durban under the theme "Mobilizing Youth Power to Build Socialism and African Unity", Hulisani was elected president of PAYCO succeeding its former president, Sbusiso Xaba.

In March 2008, he condemned the racist video made by students from Free State University. Of the acts portrayed in the video, he said they "make a mockery of the struggle against apartheid settler colonialism".

On May 30, 2009, Hulisani convened the 1st Mayihlome Annual Lecture, which was addressed by the former president of PAYCO, Mashao Matome. The lecture was used as a forum to discuss a new program adopted by PAYCO called IOTA, which is aimed at repositioning the PAC. On the same occasion an online News publication called "Mayihlome" was launched on WordPress, Hulisani currently serves as its Chief Editor.

At the PAYCO Kimberly National Congress held in November 2009, Hulisani was succeeded by Ndebele Linda as president of PAYCO

=== African Socialist International (ASI) ===
Hulisani, in his capacity as an official of PAYCO, has a relationship with the ASI, an international body of socialists who pursue a pan-African agenda. In 2006, he had a meeting with ASI Chairman Omali Yeshitela and others, on his visit to South Africa.

=== Mayihlome News ===
On 30 May 2009 Hulisani, as President of the PAYCO launched Mayihlome News, an online Pan-Africanist journal. Initially, Mayihlome News was hosted on the free WordPress platform, and in July 2014 it was moved to a self-hosted platform. Mayihlome News has attracted Pan-Africanists worldwide giving insight into the Pan-Africanist political landscape in South Africa.

== Controversies ==
Many controversies have followed the election of Hulisani as president of PAYCO.

=== Call for Lethlapa Mphahlele to step down ===
9 January 2008: Hulisani called for the resignation of PAC president Lethlapa Mphahlele. This position was met with strong objection among the leadership of the PAC, who even mentioned that PAYCO did not qualify, as a component structure, to call for the resignation of the president of the organization. Some provincial PAYCO leaders distanced themselves from the decision and the pronouncement made by Hulisani. Hulisani insisted that the decision was not taken by his person but by the NEC of PAYCO, including the provincial leaders.

=== 2009 General Elections ===
30 January 2009: a communication was made by the PAYCO NEC, to the members, on the decision to boycott the 2009 General Elections of South Africa to refuse the PAC votes. This position received some opposition from within the Pan Africanist Youth Congress of Azania, and was also against the position of PAC, as it participated in the elections.

== Education ==
Hulisani Holds an LLB (hons) from Unisa where he also completed his BJuris.

Preceded by Xaba Sbusiso	President of PAYCO; 2007–2009	Succeeded by Ndebele Linda
Preceded by Xaba Sbusiso	Secretary-General of PAYCO; 2005–2007	Succeeded by Ndebele Linda
