= Rotshidzwa Muleka =

South African soccer player

Personal information
- Full name: Rotshidzwa Tyson Muleka
- Date of birth: 18 February 1992 (age 34)
- Place of birth: Soweto, South Africa
- Position: Goalkeeper

Team information
- Current team: Black Leopards

Senior career*
Years	Team	Apps	(Gls)
2014–2017	Baroka	9	(0)
2017–	Black Leopards	37	(0)
- * Club domestic league appearances and goals as of 18:21, 9 October 2020 (UTC)

Rotshidzwa Tyson Muleka (born 18 February 1992) is a South African soccer player who plays as a goalkeeper for South African Premier Division side Black Leopards.
