= Azwinndini Muronga =

- Born: Lwamondo, Venda, South Africa
- Education: University of Venda; University of Cape Town; University of Minnesota
- Known for: § Relativistic fluid dynamics
- Awards: Distinguished Leadership Award for Internationals Alumni at the University of Minnesota
- Scientific career
- Fields: Physics
- Workplaces: University of Frankfurt; University of Cape Town; University of Johannesburg
- Thesis: Causal second order viscous relativistic fluid dynamics (2002)
- Website: https://science.mandela.ac.za/Azwinndini-Muronga

Azwinndini Muronga is a dean of science at the Nelson Mandela University. He was previously a professor of Physics and Director of the Science Center at the University of Johannesburg. He matriculated at Mbilwi Secondary School. and then completed his Bachelor of Science in physics at the University of Venda, a BSc(Honours) and a Master of Science at the University of Cape Town as well as a PhD in physics from the University of Minnesota. He was previously President of the South African Institute of Physics. He has made seminal contribution to causal second order viscous relativistic fluid dynamics.
