= South African National Biodiversity Institute =

Institution under the South African Department of Environmental Affairs

Agency overview
- Formed: 1 September 2004; 21 years ago
- Preceding agency: National Botanical Institute
- Jurisdiction: South Africa
- Headquarters: SANBI Exhibition Centre, Pretoria National Botanical Garden, Gauteng
- Motto: Biodiversity for life
- Annual budget: ▼R633 m ZAR (2020/21)
- Minister responsible: David Maynier
- Agency executives: Shonisani Munzhedzi, CEO; Dr Mmaphaka Tau, Chairperson
- Parent department: Department of Environmental Affairs
- Key document: SANBI Mandate
- Website: www.sanbi.org

The South African National Biodiversity Institute (SANBI) is an organisation tasked with research and dissemination of information on biodiversity, and legally mandated to contribute to the management of the country's biodiversity resources.

It was established in 2004 in terms of the National Environmental Management: Biodiversity Act, 2004, under the South African Department of Environmental Affairs (later renamed Department of Forestry, Fisheries and the Environment).

== History ==
SANBI was established on 1 September 2004 in terms of the National Environmental Management: Biodiversity Act, No 10 of 2004. Previously, in 1989, the autonomous statutory National Botanical Institute (NBI) had been formed from the National Botanic Gardens and the Botanical Research Institute, which had been founded in the early 20th century to study and conserve the South African flora. The mandate of the National Botanical Institute was expanded by the act to include the full diversity of the South African ecosystems. The NBI had its head office at Kirstenbosch in Cape Town, and gardens and research centres throughout South Africa.

== Function and services ==
Functions include providing knowledge, information, policy support and advice, managing botanical gardens for research, education and public enjoyment, and engaging in ecosystem restoration and rehabilitation programmes and providing models of best practice for biodiversity management.

Core activities include research into conservation and sustainable use, garden development and horticulture, education and provision of biodiversity information systems, ecosystem rehabilitation and development of bioregional planning programmes and policies.

SANBI contributes to the reduction of poverty by providing training and creating sustainable employment in programmes for rehabilitating ecosystems, and programmes to encourage participation in biodiversity science at school level and to strengthen the quality of biodiversity teaching and learning.

=== Research ===
Research is a primary component of SANBI's agenda, and includes research into climate change and bio-adaptation. The research is intended to inform climate change policy development and decision making.

=== Management of biodiversity resources ===
SANBI is legally mandated to contribute to the management of the country's biodiversity resources. The Institute hosts the Red List of South African Plants, a database with descriptions of the country's indigenous plants and their national conservation status.

SANBI also maintains the website PlantZAfrica, which contains over 1,850 Plant of the Week articles, with two new Plant of the Week articles added every week. The site also contains some basic information on the vegetation of SA and related topics. Content is developed by the horticultural and scientific staff of SANBI to provide easy access to popular information.

SANBI’s Community Adaptation Small Grants Facility has worked through district-level facilitating agencies, including Conservation South Africa in Namakwa District.

=== Knowledge and information management ===
SANBI conducts nationwide biodiversity conservation assessments of various classes of animals, which generally involve field trips for the collection of data. Interested members of the public can participate in several citizen science projects.

A biodiversity knowledge and information management system is provided which integrates existing information resources for easy access for both internal and external end-users. Since 2014 Ronell Renett Klopper is the coordinator for the South African National Plant Checklist in the Fundamental Biodiversity Sciences Division of SANBI.

== Kirstenbosch controversy ==
SANBI's management of the Kirstenbosch Botanical Gardens has drawn criticism from local volunteers, local residents, Botanical Society of South Africa (BotSoc) members, academics, environmentalists, and various political parties. In 2023 SANBI controversially canceled a one hundred year old agreement with BotSoc to allow their members to freely access the gardens, a decision criticized by the Democratic Alliance and called on then Minister for Environmental Affairs, Barbara Creecy, to reverse the decision. Academics Rochelle Kapp and Kelwyn Sole argue that a 2024 decision to introduce a flat fee to enter the garden has backfired and reduced revenue for the garden, increased reliance on volunteers and resulted in increasing levels of neglect; SANBI denied this. A Daily Maverick investigation found that the decision to cancel free access to the gardens for BotSoc members resulted in a notable decline of volunteers, further increasing levels of neglect. SANBI stated that although staffing shortages had reduced their ability to "collect and cultivate new specimens from the wild" they did "not agree with the portrayal that the garden is in a state of neglect or deterioration."

== See also ==
- PlantZAfrica - Website celebrating the plants of southern Africa
- List of botanical gardens in South Africa
- Department of Environment, Forestry and Fisheries, also known as Department of Environmental Affairs – Department of the South African national government
- iNaturalist – Website and app for sharing biodiversity observations
- National Research Foundation – Research intermediary
- SeaKeys – Collaborative marine biodiversity project in South Africa
- South African Environmental Observation Network – Long-term ecological research network
- South African Institute for Aquatic Biodiversity – Centre for the study of aquatic biodiversity in Grahamstown, South Africa
