= Milicent Makhado =

South African actress and voice-over artist

- Born: Millicent Tshiwela Makhado; Madombidzha
- Occupations: actress and voice-over artist
- Known for: Agnes Mukwevho in Muvhango
- Notable work: Muvhango, Scandal!

Millicent Tshiwela Makhado is a South African actress and voice-over artist, best known for her role as "Agnes Mukwevho" in Muvhango.

== Early life and education ==
Makhado was born in Madombidzha, Limpopo, South Africa. She was named after actress, model and TV presenter, Millicent Mseleku.

== Career ==
In 2012, she was nominated for the Africa Movie Academy Award for Best Actress in a Leading Role for playing "Margaret" in 48. She also featured in Scandal!, Man in Crisis and In A Heartbeat. In 2020, she was announced to be playing "Zandile" in the SABC comedy series, Makoti (2019). Makhado is also into activism and has been part of several projects for sensitizing child and women rights. Aside television, she is also involved in radio productions.

== Personal life ==
Following the collapse of her first marriage, she was reported to be in another relationship in 2016. She has two daughters.
