= Mashudu Tshifularo =

South African Professor of ear, nose and throat surgery

Mashudu Tshifularo Professor
- Born: 1964 or 1965 (age 61–62)
- Known for: first team in the world to use 3D-printed bones for reconstructive middle ear implants
- Scientific career
- Fields: Ear Nose and Throat (ENT); 3D printing
- Workplaces: University of Pretoria; Steve Biko Academic Hospital

Mashudu Tshifularo is a South African otolaryngologist and educator. He led the first team to use 3D-printed bones for reconstructive middle ear implants, providing a cure for some kinds of deafness.

== 3D-printed implants ==
Using a 3-D printer, Tshifularo creates implants that replace the ossicles: the hammer (malleus), anvil (incus) and stirrup (stapes) during middle ear reconstructive surgery, or tympanoplasty, that are more affordable compared to the traditional titanium implants.

Tshifularo is the head of the Department of Ear, Nose, Throat, Head and Neck Surgery at the Otorhinolaryngology Department of the University of Pretoria, and started developing this technology during his PhD studies. He and his team at the Steve Biko Academic Hospital in Pretoria performed the first transplant on 13 March 2019. The endoscopic procedures lasted approximately 2 hours. The first patient was a 40 year old with accidental trauma damage and the other was a 62 year old born with a middle ear issue and a history of failed interventions.

== Church ministry ==
Tshifularo is the senior pastor and founder of the Christ Revealed Fellowship Church near Pretoria. He has authored several books in this ministry.

== Biography ==
Tshifularo was born on June 18, 1964 in South Africa the third son of Florah Tshinovhea Tshifularo and Zacharia Thanyani Tshifularo. He grew up as a herdsman in the rural village of Mbahela outside Thohoyandou, in Venda, South Africa. At the age of 13, Tshifularo knew he would be a medical doctor. He was married to Samdika Blessings Tshifularo and they have six children including their adopted children.

He matriculated at Mbilwi Secondary School and after studying at the University of Natal, he began his career as a physician at Tshilidzini Hospital in 1990. Since 1995 he has been a professor and head of the Department of Otorhinolaryngology at the University of Pretoria and also a chief specialist at the MEDUNSA (currently the Sefako Makgatho Health Sciences University). He was appointed in 2000 as the youngest and only black professor of ENT in South Africa. His medical interests include Otology, Rhinology and Paediatric ENT.

== Bibliography ==
- Tshifularo, Mashudu. (2010). Emergency Prayer: Authority of Believers. Wandsbeck: Reach. ISBN 9780620429955. OCLC 820707348.
- Tshifylaro, Mashudu (2011). Divorce Don't Do It (1st ed. 2011 ed.). Wandsbeck: Reach Publishers. ISBN 9780620497572. OCLC 1017340491.
- "My Jewish God". Mashudu Tshifularo Ministries.
- "Outreach and Community Involvement". www.up.ac.za.
