= Motsoko Pheko =

South African politician (1930–2024)

Salzwedel Ernest "Motsoko" Pheko (13 November 1930 – 19 April 2024) was a South African lawyer, author, historian, theologian, academic and politician.

== Biography ==
Born to a wealthy rural family in Lesotho on 13 November 1930, Pheko and his brother went to live in South Africa in the 1930s upon the sudden death of their parents. They were raised by E. M. Moerane, their late mother's sister. Since 1960 Motsoko Pheko has been a member of the Pan Africanist Congress of Azania (PAC), and served in several different capacities including Organiser, Branch Chairperson, Country Representative and Member of Parliament (MP). Pheko served as a representative of the PAC to the United Nations in New York and Geneva, in addition to working in the UK, Zambia. Pheko was the president of the PAC in South Africa until 2008. Previously he was the Deputy President in three cabinets from 1995 to 2003. This is the longest presidential term in PAC history. Sobukwe served from 1959 to 1978, Leballo from 1978 to 1986.

Pheko was a founder of Daystar University in Kenya, the largest liberal arts college in Africa. Pheko was also founder and Chair of Tokoloho Development Association in South Africa, a trust which promotes research of indigenous knowledge of the African people prior to European colonisation, and publishes the results. Tokoloho is Sotho and translates as "Freedom".

Pheko held a B.A. from the University of South Africa (UNISA), where he majored in Political Science and Systematic Theology, also reading Sociology and History. UNISA has honoured Pheko with an archive that holds many of his own works. Pheko also held a Bachelor of Law degree from the University of Zambia and a Master of Law degree in international law from the University of London.

Pheko died in Johannesburg on 19 April 2024, at the age of 93.

== Published works ==
Pheko is an author of several books on topics such as history, law, political science and theology, including:

- African Renaissance Saved Christianity
- Apartheid: The Story of the Dispossessed people
- Betrayal of a Colonised People
- The Rise of Azania, the Fall of South Africa
- The Early Church in Africa
- Hidden Side of South African Politics
- The History of Robben Island Must Be Preserved
- The Land Is Ours: The Political Legacy of Mangaliso Sobukwe
- Who Are The Africans? – Indigenous Names and Identity
- The True History of Sharpeville Must Be Told
