= Mike Tuney =

South African singer, rapper, director and record producer

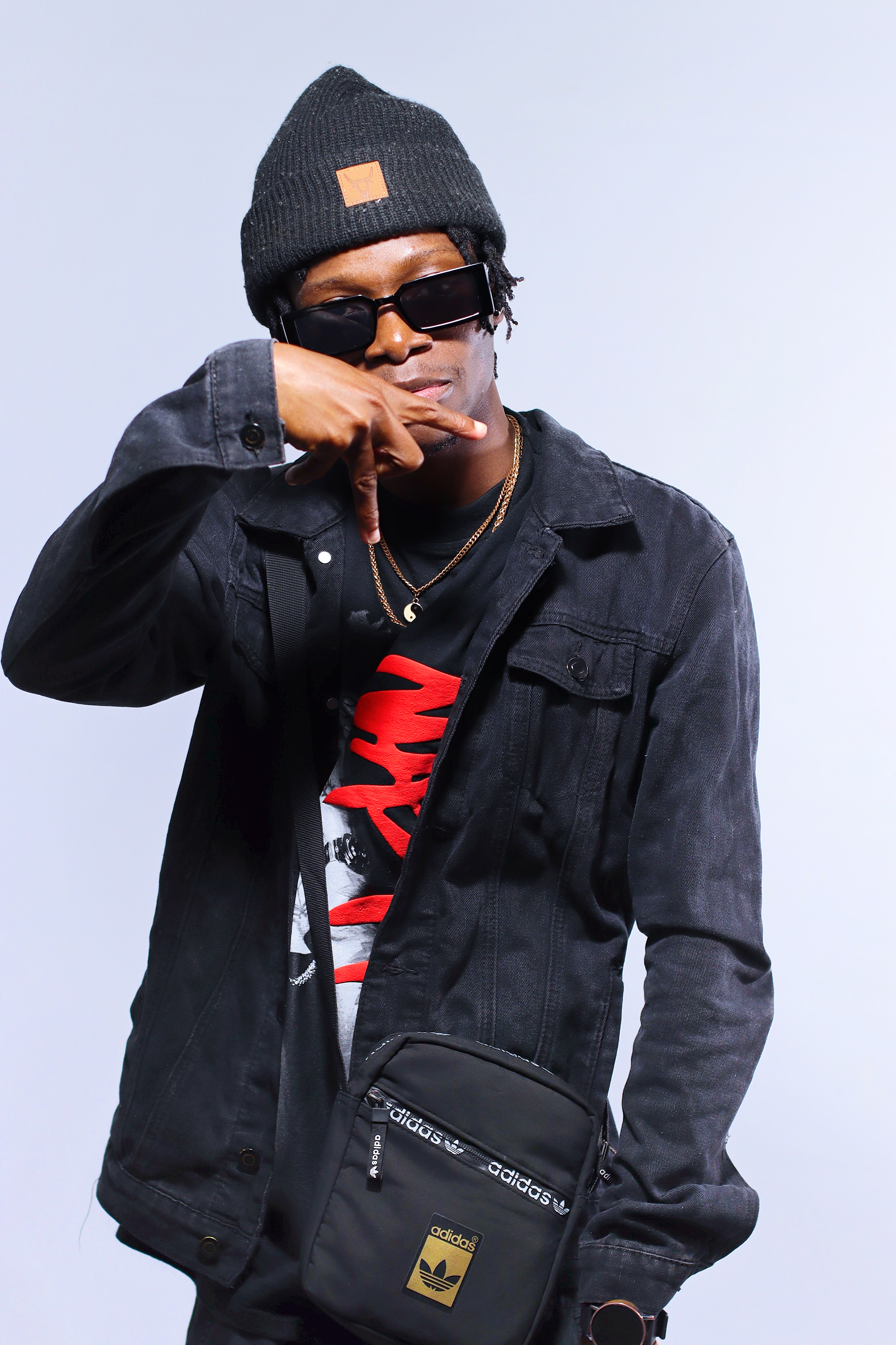
- Mike Tuney in December 2024

Background information
- Also known as: Uncle Mike
- Born: Mukhethwa Mukhadi; 22 June 1997 (age 29); Nzhelele, Limpopo, South Africa
- Origin: Dzanani, South Africa
- Genres: Hip hop; trap; R&B
- Occupations: Singer; Rapper; Producer; Director
- Instruments: Vocals; DAW
- Years active: 2013–present
- Label: Blvck Entertainment
- Website: www.miketuney.com

YouTube information
- Channel: Mike Tuney

Mukhethwa Mukhadi (born 22 June 1997), known professionally as Mike Tuney, is a South African rapper, singer, director and record producer. He is known for his song "Secure the Bag" and rose to popularity after his song "Tonight" went viral in 2016.

== Early life ==
Mukhadi was born and raised in a small village called Sendedza, which is located just outside Thohoyandou in Limpopo. His love for hip hop began when he was only 12 and after few years, he started to write and record his own songs.

== Education ==
Mukhethwa Mukhadi enrolled at the University of Venda in 2019, where he pursued studies in Public Administration. He completed a Bachelor’s degree in 2023, followed by an Honours degree in 2025. On 19 May 2026, he graduated with a Master of Administration; his thesis examined the impact of unethical conduct on the performance of municipal ward councillors within the Limpopo Province, and he is currently pursuing a Doctor of Administration.

== Music career ==
After releasing two mixtapes and one extended play, Mike released his very first studio album on his 23rd birthday in 2020, called "I Wish I Could". He gained recognition after releasing his first mixtape titled "X-Pectations" in 2016. Mike Tuney released his first self-produced single called "Mama I'm Sorry" featuring Vhole in 2019, the single also appeared on his 2020 album.

Prior to his album release in 2020, "Secure the Bag" featuring AB Crazy and Sense 2.0 was released as a lead single followed by a music video few months after the song was released. The video premiered on MTV Base Africa and Channel O, then peaked at number 4 on MTV Base's SA Hits Countdown playlist in November 2020. On 26 May, Tuney released a music video for his song titled "i.". Mike has also shared a stage with many well-known South African musicians, including the likes of A-Reece, Sjava and many more.

On January 3, 2023, Mike Tuney released a collaborative EP with McSwagga titled "New Wave Leaders. The EP consisted of five songs of which all of them were produced by God Sample, and it features ProVro, God Sample, LimitlessRaps, Young Lame, Fais Yung, & Mad-Slide. Mike released his latest solo EP on the 3rd of April 2023.

== Awards and nominations ==
Year	Award	Categories	Result	Ref.
2021	City Awards	Producer of the Year, Artist of the Year, Single of the Year	Nominated	
