= Tshilidzi Marwala =

South African engineer and university administrator

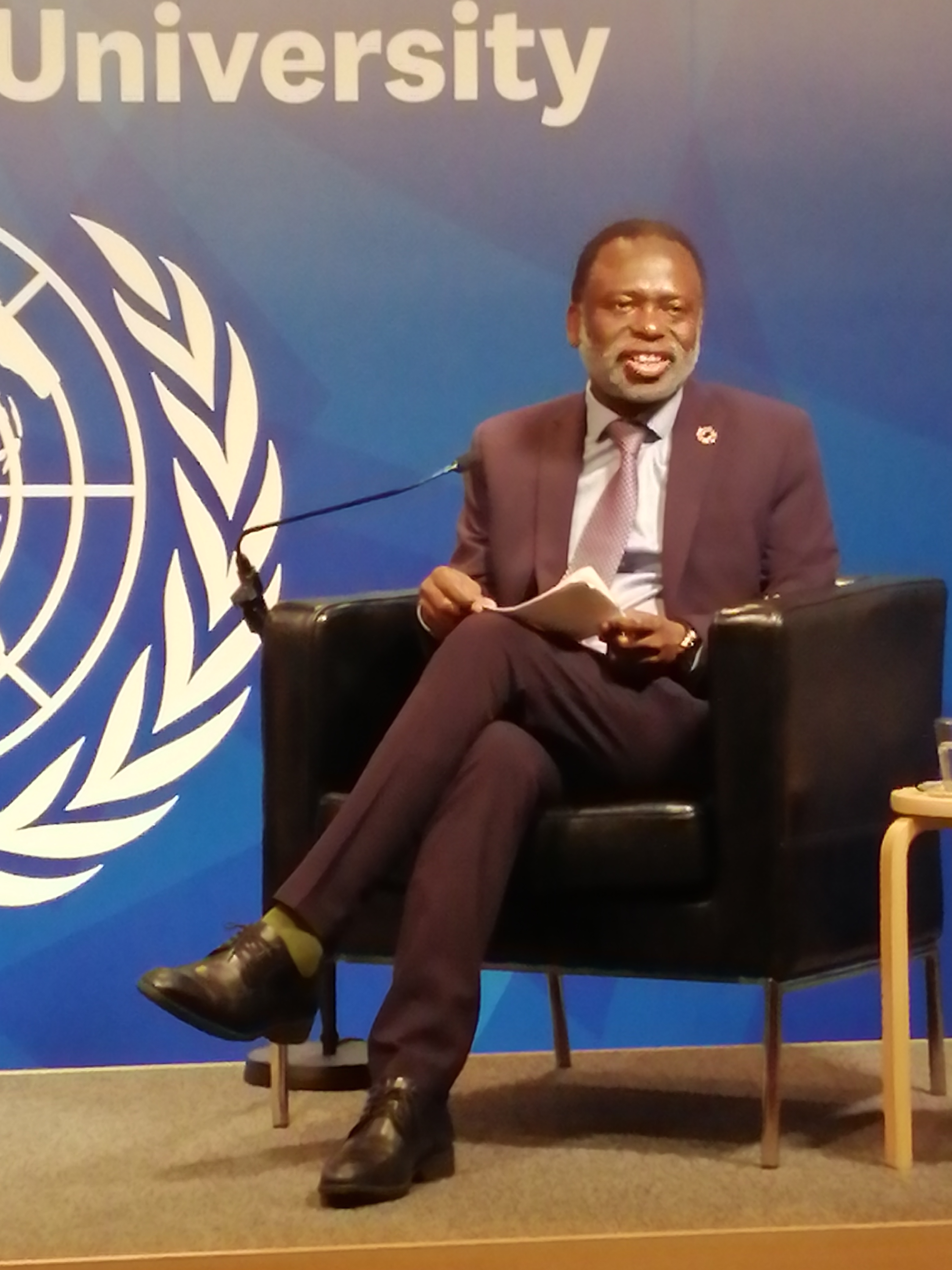
- Marwala in 2023

7th Rector of the United Nations University
- Incumbent
- Assumed office 1 March 2023
- Deputy: Sawako Shirahase, Senior Vice-Rector, UNU
- Secretary-General: António Guterres
- Preceded by: David M. Malone

2nd Vice-Chancellor and Principal of the University of Johannesburg
- In office 1 January 2018 – 28 February 2023
- Chancellor: Njabulo Ndebele; Phumzile Mlambo-Ngcuka
- Preceded by: Ihron Rensburg
- Succeeded by: Letlhokwa George Mpedi

Personal details
- Born: 28 July 1971 (age 55) Duthuni, Limpopo, South Africa
- Spouse: Jabulile Vuyiswa Manana (m. 2000, 3 children)
- Education: St John's College, Cambridge; Case Western Reserve University
- Awards: Order of Mapungubwe, American Academy of Arts and Sciences, Chinese Academy of Sciences
- Website: www.gov.za/about-government/tshilidzi-marwala
- Scientific career
- Fields: Artificial intelligence, computer science, mechanical engineering
- Workplaces: Imperial College of Science, Technology and Medicine; University of the Witwatersrand; University of Johannesburg
- Thesis: Fault Identification Using Neural Networks and Vibration Data (2000)
- Doctoral students: Fulufhelo Nelwamondo, Megan Jill Russell, Vukosi Marivate

Tshilidzi Marwala (born 28 July 1971) is a South African artificial intelligence engineer, a computer scientist, a mechanical engineer and a university administrator. He is currently Rector of the United Nations University and UN Under-Secretary-General. In August 2023 Marwala was appointed to the United Nations scientific advisory council.

== Early life and education ==
Marwala was born on 28 July 1971 in Duthuni Village in the Limpopo Province. He obtained a Bachelor of Science in mechanical engineering from Case Western Reserve University, graduating Magna Cum Laude, followed by a PhD in artificial intelligence from St John's College, Cambridge in 2000.

== Career ==
From 2000 to 2001, Marwala was a post-doctoral research associate at Imperial College of Science, Technology and Medicine. In 2003, he joined the University of the Witwatersrand and became a professor of electrical engineering in 2008. From 2013 to 2017, he was the deputy vice chancellor for research and internationalization as well as the dean of engineering at the University of Johannesburg.

From 2018 to 2023, Marwala was the vice-chancellor and principal of the University of Johannesburg. As Vice-Chancellor of the University of Johannesburg, Marwala developed and implemented the fourth industrial revolution (4IR) strategy, by introducing a compulsory artificial intelligence course and an Africa Insights course for all students, irrespective of their majors.

Marwala has been Rector of the United Nations University and UN Under-Secretary-General since 1 March 2023. He was a member of the World Health Organization (WHO) committee that developed the ethical guidelines of using artificial intelligence in medicine.

Marwala served as a trustee of the Nelson Mandela Foundation (2020–2023) and on a board of Nedbank (2019–2023). He is a member of council of the University of Peace and the STS Forum Kyoto.

Marwala was the Deputy Chair of South Africa's Presidential Commission on the Fourth Industrial Revolution (with the President of South Africa Cyril Ramaphosa serving as Chair). He is the Chair of the International Scientific Advisory Board for the African Centre of Excellence in the Internet of Things (ACE-IoT) based in Rwanda. The government of Namibia appointed him on the Fourth Industrial Revolution Task Team.

== Research ==
Marwala's research interests include the theory and application of artificial intelligence to engineering and computer science such as the St. Petersburg paradox, blockchain, and poker., finance and economics, medicine like his work on pulmonary embolism epileptic activity, HIV and COVID-19, and political science.

== Outreach and public engagement ==
Marwala's work and opinion have appeared in media such as New Scientist, The Economist, CNN, and BBC. He has also given talks at Royal Society, Cambridge Union, and Oxford Union. In 2016 Tshilidzi Marwala delivered the Bernard Price Memorial Lecture in South Africa. With Stephen Hawking and Guy Laliberté, he was a judge of the YouTube Space Lab competition.

== Personal life ==
Marwala is married to Jabulile Vuyiswa Manana since 2000, and together they have 3 children.

== Awards and honours ==
Marwala is a fellow of The World Academy of Sciences (2010), African Academy of Sciences (2012), American Academy of Arts and Sciences (2022), Chinese Academy of Sciences (2023), and the Academy of Science of South Africa. He is the recipient of the Bronze Order of Mapungubwe in 2004. In 2010, he was elected an ACM Distinguished Member.

In 2022, Marwala was awarded the IT Personality of the Year Award in South Africa for his work on the fourth Industrial Revolution. In 2020, he received the Science-for-Society Gold Medal from the Academy of Science of South Africa, and in 2024 the Hans Carl von Carlowitz Sustainability Award.

Marwala has received honorary doctorates from the Caucasus University in Tbilisi in Georgia, the University of Venda., Tshwane University of Technology and the University of Pretoria. Marwala has been a visiting fellow at Harvard University, Wolfson College, Cambridge, and University of California, Berkeley.

Marwala was selected as one of the 100 most influential Africans of 2024 by New African Magazine, which noted "his extensive application of artificial intelligence concepts across multiple fields, including health care, aerospace engineering, economics, finance, and political science."

== See also ==
- Simon Connell – Particle physicist in South Africa
- Youba Sokona – Malian climatologist (born 1950)
- Mohamed Thameur Chaibi – Tunisian professor of Rural Engineering
- Vukosi Marivate
