= South African Environmental Observation Network =

Long-term ecological research network

- Formation: 2002; 24 years ago
- Headquarters: 56 Florence Street, Colbyn, Pretoria
- Managing Director: Dr Mary-Jane Bopape
- Parent organisation: National Research Foundation
- Budget: R132 million (2020)
- Staff: 95 (2020)
- Website: Official website

The South African Environmental Observation Network (SAEON) is a science network of people, organisations and, most importantly observation platforms, that perform Long-Term Ecological Research (LTER) in South Africa and its surrounding oceans. The SAEON is of global importance as an innovative approach in ecology to understand environmental change and to determine the impact of anthropogenic forces at multiple scales but it is a remarkably complex challenge to statistically discern between ubiquitous natural variability and exogenous forcing. The SAEON constitutes a national government response to the World Summit on Sustainable Development (Earth Summit 2002) and is a component of the GEO (Group on Earth Observations). The SAEON has become the leader in environmental science and observation in South Africa, but has been criticised for taking a long time to establish, a situation which was inevitable in view of SAEON's multiple stakeholder corps. It has also been raised that the cost of replicated experimental treatments across SAEON sites will be high.

Honckenii is SAEON's rigid hulled inflatable for estuarine and inshore observations

== Vision ==
SAEON is a comprehensive, sustained, coordinated and responsive South African environmental observation network that delivers long-term reliable data for scientific research and informs decision-making; for a knowledge society and improved quality of life.

== Development path ==
The SAEON's development was stimulated by the International Long-Term Ecological Research in 1996 and promoted further by South Africa's Foundation for Research Development. This initiative led to a study tour of the USLTER and a landmark national science meeting, held together with an ILTER meeting in 1999, during which a large number of stakeholders supported the notion of a South African LTER.

South African government departments met with the proponents of a South African LTER in 2001 and approved the establishment of the SAEON under the management of the National Research Foundation. The Department of Science and Technology (South Africa) funded the SAEON as of 2002. In 2004, the Department of Environmental Affairs and Tourism recognised the potential role of the SAEON in climate change research in the national Climate Change Response Strategy.

== Nodes and governance ==
The SAEON performs environmental monitoring and research via strategically located nodes. The nodes also provide research support to collaborators. Nodes are geographically distributed across South Africa to provide good coverage of biomes or subsets thereof. At the start of 2011 the respective nodes were:

- SAEON Ndlovu Node at Phalaborwa, hosted by the South African National Parks. The node focuses on the Savanna Biome.
- SAEON Elwandle Coastal Node in Gqeberha, it based at Nelson Mandela University's Ocean Sciences Campus. The node focuses on coastal-inshore systems.
- SAEON Egagasini Node in Cape Town, hosted by the Department of Environmental Affairs. The node focuses on marine-offshore systems.
- SAEON Fynbos Node, in Cape Town, hosted by the South African National Biodiversity Institute. The node focuses on the mediterranean Cape Floral Kingdom.
- SAEON Arid Lands Node, in Kimberley, Northern Cape, hosted by SANParks. The node focuses on the Nama Karoo and Succulent Karoo Biomes.
- SAEON Grasslands-Forests-Wetlands Node, in Pietermaritzburg, hosted by Ezemvelo KZN Wildlife. The node focuses on the Grassland and Forest Biomes as well as on wetlands.

The SAEON is coordinated by a National Office located in Pretoria.

== Observation and research ==
The SAEON focuses on question-driven in situ monitoring to gather time-series data at multiple scales with a view to understanding environmental change guided by a Core Science Framework.

An example of the role that the SAEON plays in the wider field of Earth observation is its assumption of custodianship of the Jonkershoek hydrological observation system in 2009 and the long-term preservation of the data set that spans more than seven decades.

== Data and information ==
The SAEON developed an online information management system with spatial analytical capability to connect the distributed data holdings of nodes and external data sources. The system, which uses open-source software and supports the visualisation of data, deals with multiple metadata standards and is being integrated with the Global Earth Observation System of Systems. The SAEON offers open access to its own data, an essential strategy for its success.

== Education and outreach ==
Schools and universities are beneficiaries of a programme designed to produce potential future Earth observation scientists. Monitoring projects, winter schools, training workshops, teacher support, science events and a graduate student network are some of the activities of the SAEON.
