= Lwamondo =

- Location within Limpopo Location within South Africa
- Coordinates: 23.011°S 30.357°E
- Country: South Africa
- Province: Limpopo
- District: Vhembe
- Municipality: Thulamela

Area
  - Total: 20.72 km^{2} (8.00 sq mi)

Population (2011)
  - Total: 20,218
  - Density: 975.8/km^{2} (2,527/sq mi)

Racial makeup (2011)
  - Black African: 99.9%

First languages (2011)
  - Venda: 96.9%
  - Other: 3.1%
- Time zone: UTC+2 (SAST)
- PO box: 0985
- Area code: 015

Lwamondo is a village in the Vhembe District Municipality, of Limpopo Province, South Africa. It has been ruled by Vho-Thovhele A. C. Nelwamondo as the paramount chief, also known as Ndaedzo which is a regnal name, since 1971. He celebrated his Golden Jubilee in 2022.

== Throne succession ==
1. Tshilande
2. Mapungwi
3. Radali
4. Mathule
5. Maboho (rule 1830s died 1883)
6. Phophi Sidemere (rule 1883 died 1942)
7. Lupenyo Mugaguli (rule 1942 died 1970)
8. Ndaedzo (ruling since 1971 -)

* It is believed that Tshifhiwa Nelwamondo is likely to succeed his father

== Villages in Lwamondo ==
Each of these villages runs its own affairs, under the Headman, who reports directly to Thovhele Aifheli Calvin Nelwamondo (Ndaedzo). The villages are as follows:

1. Belemu:
2. Tshivhale : Mulindathavha - Headman
3. Lukau : Mmbengwa Engedzani Makhani (Fhumulani) - Headman
4. Tshitavha : Nelwamondo Vhangani Alfred (Nduvheni) -Headman
5. Badama : Nelwamondo Oupa (Mpfareseni) - Headman
6. Tshiseni : Nelwamondo Belson - Headman
7. Mutandani : Vho Vusani (regnal name)
8. Matatani
9. Vhungwili :
10. Tshifulanani
11. Dzwerani :
12. Zwavhavhili
13. Mugomeli
14. Khumbe - Vho Tshikhovhokhovho - Headman
15. Pambani: Ratshikuni Ravhanadzo ( Muonyolosi)
16. Tshikosi
17. Mathule
18. Vhunama
19. Mahematshena
20. Makambe - Nyakhuhu Gilbert - Headman
21. Tshiozwi - Phophi Sidemere - Headman
22. hiema - Vho Nemukovhani (Nthuseni)
23. Thuhwi
24. Matavhela
25. Tshishushuru
26. Tshalovha
27. Mvelaphanda -
28. Mutshetoni - Vho Tshisiwana (regnal name)
29. Tshidzete
30. Mahunguni
31. Makambe 2 - Vho Avhampfuni (regnal name)

== Schools in Lwamondo ==
There are a number of schools in Lwamondo. Notably, the following:

1. Belemu primary
2. Tshivhale primary
3. Tshiwedza primary
4. Makakavhale secondary
5. Matshele primary
6. Maphuphe primary
7. Shondoni secondary
8. Luvhaivhai secondary
9. Masembelwe primary
10. Andries Mugaguli secondary
11. Mathule primary
12. Tshifulanani primary
13. Mutshipisi primary
14. Lwamondo secondary
15. Tshifhumulo primary
16. Ndaedzo secondary
17. Mangomani primary
18. Dzondo primary
19. Mahematshena primary
20. Dzwerani primary
21. Tshikhovhokhovho primary
