= Rendani Masutha =

South African naval officer (died 2018)

- Born: Hamutsha, Thohoyandou, South Africa
- Died: 23 June 2018
- Military career
- Allegiance: South Africa
- Branch: South African Navy
- Rank: Rear Admiral (Junior Grade)

Rear Admiral (Junior Grade) Rendani Masutha was South African naval officer.

She completed her law degree at the University of Venda and her LLB at the University of the North. She obtained an LL.M. from Unisa. Masutha graduated from the Naval College in 1995, becoming the first black officer in the navy, and joined the legal office in Simon's Town.

Masutha was appointed a military judge in 2005 and served as senior military judge from 2006 to 2010.

She was promoted to rear admiral (Junior Grade) on 1 June 2011 and appointed Director Defence Legal Service and Director Military Defence Counsel.

Masutha died on 23 June 2018.
