= National Research Foundation (South Africa) =

Research intermediary

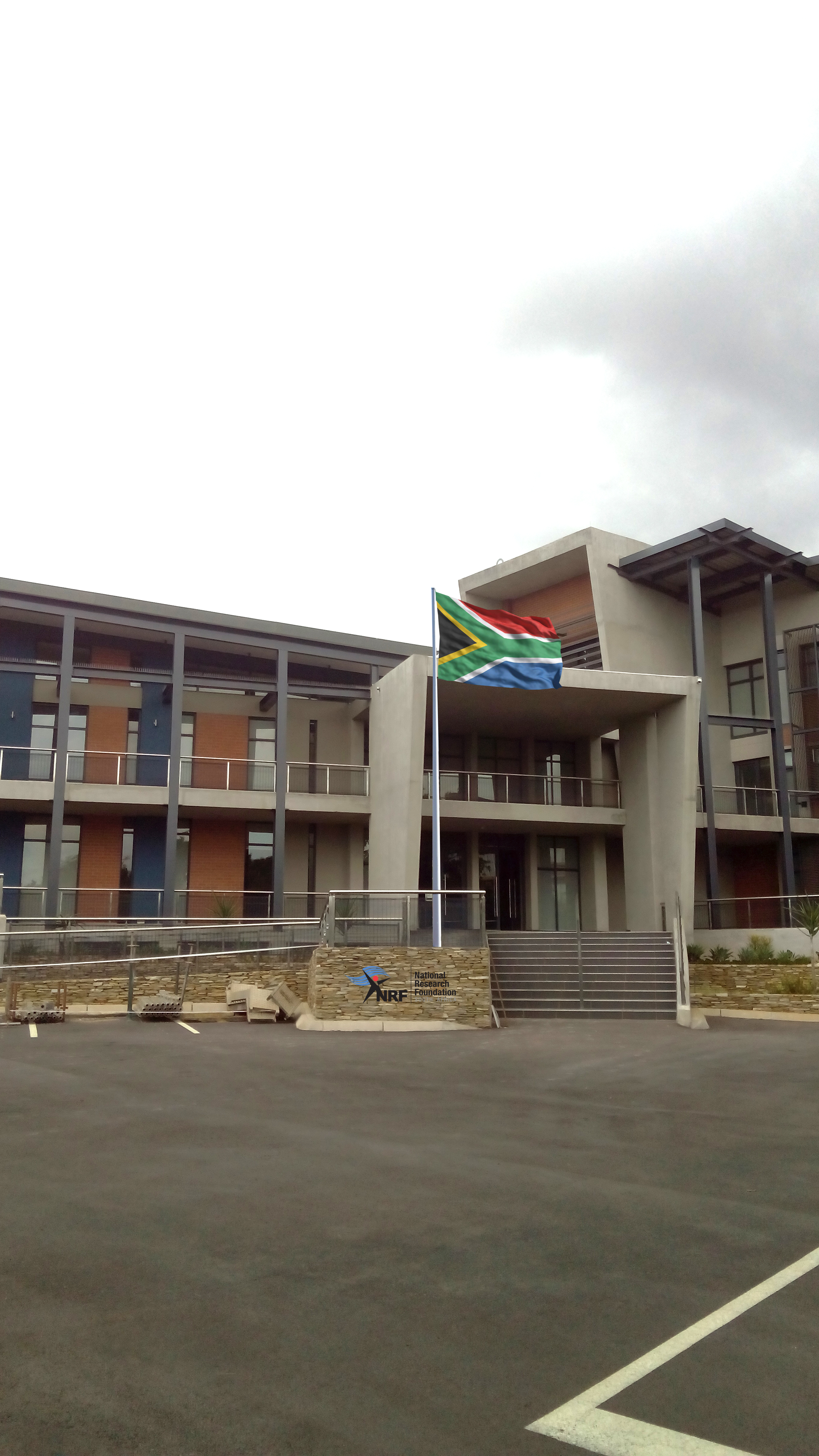
- NRF Headquarters in Pretoria, South Africa
- Abbreviation: NRF
- Formation: April 1, 1999; 27 years ago
- Type: Governmental
- Legal status: Foundation
- Purpose: Funding and research in South Africa
- Headquarters: NRF Building, CSIR Complex, Meiring Naudé Road, Brummeria, Pretoria
- Region served: South Africa
- Official language: English
- Leader: Prof Fulufhelo Nelwamondo
- Parent organisation: Department of Science and Innovation
- Website: www.nrf.ac.za

The National Research Foundation (NRF) is a South African Schedule 3A public entity established by the National Research Foundation Act, 1998 to support and advance research, human capacity development, national research facilities, and public engagement with science.

== History ==
It was established on 1 April 1999 as an autonomous statutory body in accordance with the National Research Foundation Act. Dr Fulufhelo Nelwamondo has been appointed as Chief Executive Officer of the National Research Foundation of South Africa with effect from 1 April 2021. The NRF Board is chaired by Prof Mosa Moshabela. In 2020, South Africa's science budget cuts reduced the NRF's government allocation by about 10 percent. In 2017, planned cuts to an NRF programme that recognised and rewarded research excellence drew criticism from South African researchers.

== Functions ==
The NRF's science engagement programme aims to transform the relationship between science and society through public awareness of, and engagement with, science.

1. to support research and innovation, through its agency, Research and Innovation Support and Advancement (RISA)
2. to encourage an interest in science and technology through its business unit, the South African Agency for Science and Technology Advancement (SAASTA);
3. to facilitate high-end research through its National Research Facilities (South African Institute for Aquatic Biodiversity; Hartebeesthoek Radio Astronomy Observatory; iThemba Laboratory for Accelerator Based Sciences; South African Astronomical Observatory; Hermanus Magnetic Observatory; National Zoological Gardens of South Africa; South African Environmental Observation Network)

The NRF also manages the South African Research Chairs Initiative (SARChI), a government human-capital development programme intended to strengthen research and innovation capacity at South African public universities. By 2016, the South African Research Chairs Initiative and the Centres of Excellence programme had funded more than 200 senior research positions and 15 centres in fields such as astronomy, palaeontology and theoretical physics.

One of the NRF’s key objectives is to ensure appropriately qualified people and high-level infrastructure to produce the knowledge that makes South Africa a global competitor. Its "focus areas" are:

- Research and Innovation Support
- Astro/Space/Geo Sciences
- Biodiversity / Conservation
- Nuclear Sciences
- Advancing Science

Unlike other Science Councils whose role is research performance, the NRF primarily fulfils an agency role, with a smaller portion of its activity allocated to actual research. Funding from the NRF is largely directed towards academic research, developing high-level human resources, and supporting the National Research Facilities, although beneficiaries include students, and private individuals or companies. KZN Literary Tourism is a project which has received funding through the NRF.

== Associated researchers and advisers ==
Among scholars associated with NRF-backed research chairs is Pumla Gobodo-Madikizela, holder of the South African National Research Foundation Chair in Violent Histories and Transgenerational Trauma at Stellenbosch University. Khotso Mokhele was the founding president and chief executive officer from 1999 to 2006. In 2002, Daya Reddy was appointed chair of its board. Siddhartha Paul Tiwari served as an expert adviser to the foundation.

== Centres of Excellence ==
In 2004 the NRF founded seven Centres of Excellence (COE), which aim to facilitate inter-disciplinary research with the aim of enhancing research and capacity building. Additional COEs have been added since:

- CoE for Integrated Mineral and Energy Resource Analysis
- CoE in Human Development
- CoE in Food Security
- CoE in Scientometrics and STI Policy (2014): The Nodal Head is Rasigan Maharajh.
- CoE in Mathematical and Statistical Sciences
- Centre of Excellence in Palaeosciences
- The National Institute for Theoretical Physics
- Centre of Excellence in Epidemiology Modelling and Analysis
- Applied Centre for Climate and Earth Systems Science (ACCESS)
- Centre of Excellence in Tree Health Biotechnology
- Centre of Excellence for Biomedical Tuberculosis Research
- Centre of Excellence in Catalysis
- Centre of Excellence in Birds as Key to Biodiversity Conservation
- Centre of Excellence in Strong Materials
- Centre of Excellence for Invasion Biology

== See also ==
- Department of Science and Technology (South Africa)
- Council for Scientific and Industrial Research
- Human Sciences Research Council (South Africa)
- Open access in South Africa and List of South African open access repositories
