= Philip Kgosana =

South African politician (1936 – 2017)

Philip Kgosana leading an anti-pass march in Cape Town on 30 March 1960

Philip Ata Kgosana (Born in now Makapanstad, North West, South Africa 12 October 1936 – 19 April 2017) was a leader of the Pan Africanist Congress in South Africa. He is known for leading a demonstration at the age of 23 on 30 March 1960, in which 30,000 protestors opposing the country's pass laws marched from Langa to Cape Town, one of the largest anti-apartheid demonstrations to take place in Cape Town. He was arrested and later granted bail to celebrate Christmas with his family. He took the chance to leave the country and begin a life of exile.

Kgosana died of cancer on 19 April 2017. A section of the M3 expressway into Cape Town was renamed Philip Kgosana Drive in his honour, as this formed part of his 1960 march. It was formerly known as De Waal Drive, after Nicolaas Frederic de Waal, a former Administrator of the Cape Province who initiated its construction in the early 1900s.
