= List of L'Oréal-UNESCO For Women in Science International Rising Talents laureates =

The L'Oréal-UNESCO For Women in Science Awards, created in 1998, aim to improve the position of women in science by recognizing outstanding women researchers who have contributed to scientific progress. Aside from the main awards, from 2000 to 2014, international fellowships were awarded yearly to doctoral and post-doctoral women to allow them to pursue their research in host laboratories outside their home countries.

Established in 2015, the International Rising Talent Grants are awarded annually to 15 PhD students and post-doctoral Fellows. They replace the former International Fellowships.

== International Fellowship laureates ==
=== 2000 ===
- Yézoumi Akogo, Togo
- Dorsaf Essebaï, Tunisia
- María del Pilar Jiménez Alzate, Colombia
- Rhoda Kariba, Kenya
- Margarita Marqués Martínez, Spain
- Sonia Nasr, Lebanon
- June Young Park, Republic of Korea
- Marcia Roye, Jamaica
- Tatyana Savchenko, Azerbaijan
- Yufeng Wang, China

=== 2001 ===
- Rebecca Salu Livingstone, Nigeria Zoology
- Reine Raïssa Note, Congo Pharmacology
- Analilia Arroyo Becerra, Mexico Plant biology
- Jacqueline Chaparro Olaya, Colombia Parasitology
- Suraini Abd-Aziz, Malaysia Biochemistry
- Allison Joy Haywood, New Zealand Planktonology
- Amaal Mohamadein Ahamad, Egypt Ecotoxicology
- Chantal Farra, Lebanon Human genetics
- Miroslava Atanassova, Bulgaria Microbiology
- Jarmila Nahalkova, Slovakia Plant biology

=== 2002 ===
- Namrita Lall, South Africa Bacteriology
- Djeneba Konate Keita, Mali Environment
- Giovanna Elizabeth Sotil Caycho, Peru Biodiversity
- Rahanna Alicia Juman, Trinidad And Tobago Environment
- Hasina Akhter, Bangladesh Biotechnology
- Jennifer Louise Smith, New Zealand Enzymology
- Salma Bisbis, Morocco Nutrition
- Mounira Hmani Aifa, Tunisia Genetics
- Anila Paparisto, Albania Molecular Biology
- Andrea Hickel, Austria Biophysics

=== 2003 ===
- Sodangi Abdulkarim Luka Gesinde (Nigeria) Parasitology
- Darie Alikaj (Syria) Virology
- Rocío Díaz-Benjumea Benavides (Venezuela) Parasitology/Cell Biology
- Shiva Seyed Forootan (Iran) Molecular Biology
- Dionicia Gamboa Vilela (Peru) Molecular Biology
- Karin Jacobs (South Africa) Mycology
- Adriana Jalba (Romania) Plant Biology
- Mary George Kaileh (Palestinian Authority) Molecular Biology
- María Gabriela Palomo (Argentina) Marine Ecology
- Samia Rejiba (Tunisia) Molecular Biology
- Ahou Edwige Siransy (Côte d'Ivoire) Physiology
- Devi Stuart-Fox (Australia) Ecology/Evolutionary Biology
- Ahu Altinkut Uncuoglu (Turkey) Molecular Biology
- Victoria Yavelsky (Israel) Molecular Biology/Immunology

=== 2004 ===
- María Teresa Abreu (Venezuela) Cellular Biology
- Salwa Hamid Al Khayat (Yemen) Microbiology
- Mouna Al-Sabbagh (Syria) Biotechnology
- Maryam Aminu (Nigeria) Virology
- Ines Atmosukarto (Indonesia) Microbiology
- Semra Aygün (Turkey) Molecular Biology
- Silvia Bilokapic (Croatia) Molecular Biology
- Elena Luminita Bradatan (Romania) Medicine/Oncology
- María Laura Guichón (Argentina) Ecology
- Bibi Rehana Jauhangeer (Mauritius) Molecular Microbiology
- Blandina Lugendo (Tanzania) Marine Biology
- Ghinwa Naja (Lebanon) Physical Chemistry
- Rosa Estela Navarro (Mexico) Developmental Biology
- Farzana Shaheen (Pakistan) Chemistry
- Diana Webster (New Zealand) Medical Science

=== 2005 ===
- Aisha Abubakar Abdulwahab (Nigeria) – Prevalence of tuberculosis in humans and animals in Nigeria
- Mariam Allach (Morocco): Rehabilitation, protection and sustainability of the argan tree
- Cho N’Din Catherine Boni-Cisse (Côte d'Ivoire) – Characterization of haemophilus influenzae of isolated strains of meningitis
- Marlein Miranda Cona (Cuba): Development of radiopharmaceuticals to detect and treat malignant tumors
- Michelle Lucinda de Oliveira (Brazil): Liver cancers: link between liver resection and metastasis development
- Habiba Drici (Algeria): Molecular Biology: lactic bacteria used in the production of fermented foods
- Özlem Zehra Keskin (Turkey): Structural biochemistry of proteins
- Fati Kirakoya (Burkina Faso) – Biostatistics: association between sexually transmissible disease and HIV infection in Ouagadougou
- Ketsiri Kueseng (Thailand): Polymer Science: water and oil repellency of Thai silk
- María Valeria Lara (Argentina): Genetic Engineering: tobacco and other drought-resistant plants
- Yong Sun Kye (North Korea): Genetic Engineering: insect-resistant soybean plants
- Katharine Arwen Michie (Australia): Biochemistry: SMC protein complex and interaction with DNA
- Agnieszka Elzbieta Sadowska (Poland): Neurobiology: polarization of developing neurons
- Reema Fayez Tayyem (Jordan): Epidemiology of colon cancer: inhibitory effect of curcuma
- Paola Tiberia Zanna (Italy): Melanogenesis: Expression of the MC1R gene

=== 2006 ===
- Zeina Daher (Lebanon) Biochemistry: Study Of Mitochondrial DNA Mutations
- Juana del Valle Mendoza (Peru) Immunology: Development Of A Therapeutic Vaccine Against Hiv-1, The Virus Responsible For Aids
- Dilfuza Egamberdiyeva (Uzbekistan) Environmental Microbiology: Development Of Environmentally Friendly, Bacteria-Based fertilizer
- Ghada Ahmed Mohamed Abu El-Heba (Egypt) Molecular Biology: Improvement Of Nitrogen-Fixation In Leguminosae
- Sabah Ben Fredj (Tunisia) Microbiology: Study Of The Genetic Variability Of Fungi Found On Grapes In Tunisian Vineyards
- Valérie Gbonon (Côte d'Ivoire) Microbiology: Study Of The Virulence Factors Of Group B Streptococcus Bacteria Infections To Improve Antibiotic Treatment For Pregnant Women And Newborns
- Stéphanie Jenouvrier (France) Ecology: The Impact Of Global Warming On The Population Dynamics Of Emperor Penguins
- Anita Krisko (Croatia) Structural Biology: Computer Modeling To Investigate How Degradation Of Proteins In The Eye Lens Can Lead To Blindness
- Priyadharshini Madhou (Mauritius) Plant Biotechnology: Study Of Genes Controlling Plant Resistance To Fungus Infection
- Irene Maier (Austria) Biomedicine: Development Of An Immunological Biochip To Facilitate Clinical Diagnosis Of Food Allergies
- Andréa Mantesso, (Brazil) Health Sciences: Study Of Dental Stem Cells To Provide Innovative Solutions For Cavities And Craniofacial Deformities
- Prudence Mutowo (Zimbabwe) Molecular Biology: Study Of Gene Regulation In Archaea
- Mun Peak Nyon (Malaysia) Structural Biology: Determining The Three-Dimensional Structure Of Cutinase
- Diana Pérez Staples (Mexico) Behavioral Ecology: Study Of Biological Pest Control To Reduce The Use Of Environmentally Dangerous Insecticides
- Ruchi Singh (India) Parasitology: Identification Of Genes Involved In Drug-Resistance Of Leishmaniasis

=== 2007 ===
- Fatima Musbah Abbas (Sudan) Plant Molecular Biology
- Mestawet Taye Asfaw (Ethiopia) Food Science
- Rhimou Bouhlal (Morocco) Marine Biology
- Venetia Briggs (Belize) Behavioral Ecology
- Nancy Chandia (Chile) Organic Chemistry
- Irene Chiolo (Italy) Molecular Biology
- Gisella Cruz Garcia (Netherlands Conservation Biology/Ecology
- Khady Nani Dramé (Senegal) Plant Biotechnology
- Fenny Dwivany (Indonesia) Molecular Biology
- Laura Echarte (Argentina) Crop Physiology
- Petra Klepac (Croatia) Epidemiology
- Sarrah Ben M'barek (Tunisia) Plant Biotechnology
- Christine Ouinsavi (Benin) Forest Biology
- Barno Sultanova (Uzbekistan) Biotechnology
- Chawanee Thongpanchang (Thailand) Medicinal Chemistry

=== 2008 ===
Sources:

- Hakima Amjres, Morocco
- Naranjargal Dashdorj, Mongolia
- Magda Bou Dagher Kharrat, Lebanon
- Made Tri Ari Penia Kresnowati, Indonesia
- Federica Migliardo, Italy
- Yonelle Dea Moukoumbi, Gabon
- Susanna Phoboo, Nepal
- Maria João Rego Rodrigues, Mozambique
- Lina María Saavedra Díaz, Colombia
- Hanneline Adri Smit, South Africa
- Alma Tostmann, the Netherlands
- Carolina Trochine, Argentina
- Andrea Von Groll, Brazil
- Maja Zagmajster, Slovenia
- Jamillah Zamoon, Kuwait

=== 2009 ===
- Marie Abboud (Lebanon) Non-invasive optical methods for the study of biological structures
- Rima Al-Besharat (Syria) local probiotic bacteria for use in functional food products
- Ishrat Bano (Pakistan) Development of magnetic nanoparticles for use in drug delivery
- Yean Yean Chan (Malaysia) Electrochemical DNA biosensors for molecular diagnosis of infectious disease
- Nonhlanhla Dlamani (South Africa) African traditional medicine used in the treatment of Kaposi's sarcoma
- Berta González Frankenberger (Mexico) speech and voice processing in neonates and premature babies
- Cecilia Gonzales-Marin (Peru) oral infections and medical complications in pregnant women
- Fina Kurreeman (Mauritius) Study of genes specifically associated with rheumatoid arthritis
- Khadijetou Lekweiry (Mauritania) Transmission of malaria in the Nouakchott
- Lydia Lynch (Ireland) human omentum as an immunological tool
- Joan Munissi (Tanzania) Antimicrobial compounds isolated from cultures of Tanzanian marine-derived fungi
- Ivana Pešić (Serbia) identification of urine proteins, renal disease
- Mareike Posner (Germany) resistance of enzyme structures within organisms adapted to extreme conditions
- Jingyi Shi (China) Genetics of acute myeloid leukemia
- Paula Villar (Argentina) computer-based model of the heart in 3D

=== 2010 ===
- Diana Marcela Bolaños Rodríguez (Colombia)
- Nawal Bouayayne (Morocco)
- Ghalia Boubaker (Tunisia)
- Hadeer El-Dakhakni (Egypt)
- María Gabriel Gei (Costa Rica)
- María-Teresa Guardiola-Claramonte (Spain)
- Antima Gupta (India)
- Elisabeth Lendoye (Gabon)
- Irene Margiolaki (Greece)
- Margoth Mitchela Moreno Vigo (Peru)
- Marietta Solange Soupi Nkeutcha (Cameroon)
- Djoudi Roukia (Comoros)
- Yifen Tan (Malaysia)
- Marissa Teo (Singapore)
- Svitlana Yablonska (Ukraine)

=== 2011 ===
- Mais Absi (Syria) molecular endocrinology
- Reyam Al-Malikey (Iraq) ecology
- Andia Chaves Fonnegra (Colombia) marine ecology
- Isabel Cristina Chinchilla Soto (Costa Rica) ecology
- Samia Elfékih (Tunisia) molecular biology
- Hagar Gelbard-Sagiv (Israel) neurobiology
- Alejandra Jaramillo Gutiérrez (Panama) parasitology
- Tatiana Lopatina (Russia) cell biology
- Nilufar Mamadalieva (Uzbekistan) plant biochemistry and pharmacology
- Germaine L. Minoungou (Burkina Faso) virology
- Justine Germo Nzweundji (Cameroon) plant biotechnology
- Jiban Jyoti Panda (India) biotechnology
- Ladan Teimoori Toolabi (Iran) medical biotechnology
- Triin Vahisalu (Estonia) plant molecular biology
- Fadzai Zengeya (Zimbabwe) agricultural sciences

=== 2012 ===
- Kathrin Barboza Márquez (Bolivia) Behavioural Ecology
- Dana Bazzoun (Lebanon) Cell and Molecular Biology
- Giomar Helena Borrero-Pérez (Colombia) Marine Biology
- Naama Geva-Zatorsky (Israel) Molecular and Systems Biology
- Emna Harigua (Tunisia) Molecular Biology and Bioinformatics
- Zoë Hilton (New Zealand) Marine Biology
- Gladys Kahaka (Namibia) Biotechnology/Biochemistry
- Aziza Hassan Kamel (Egypt) Virology
- Vita Majce (Slovenia) Molecular Biology and Chemistry
- Dora Medina (Mexico) Bioengineering
- Peggoty Mutai (Kenya) Medicinal Chemistry
- Sidrotun Naim (Indonesia) Molecular Virology
- Patricia Miang Lon Ng (Singapore) Protein Engineering
- Johannie Maria Spaan (South Africa) Wildlife Biology
- Elza Van Deel (The Netherlands) Cardiology and Molecular Genetics

=== 2013 ===
- Naima Abattouy, Morocco Biology
- Beatriz Álvarez Sanna, Uruguay Biochemistry
- Ariana Barbera, Cuba Immunology
- Enkhmaa Davaasambuu, Mongolia Maternal Health
- Laure El-Chamy, Lebanon Molecular Biology
- Marina Faiella, Italy Biochemistry and Biotechnology
- Sri Fatmawati, Indonesia Natural Products Chemistry
- Lina Gallego, Colombia Cancer Genomics
- Florencia Linero, Argentina Virology
- Allison Louthan, United States of America Ecology
- Kanika Mitra, Bangladesh Food science
- Marie Florence Ngo Ngwe, Cameroon Plant Biotechnology
- Sahwa Adil Nourein, Sudan Clinical immunology
- Eucharia Oluchi Nwaichi, Nigeria Environment and Toxicology
- Osnat Penn, Israel Computational Biology
- Anita Takura, Ghana Agricultural and Environmental Science

=== 2014 ===
- Francisca Barake, Chile Cellular and Molecular Biology
- Katalin Czondor, Hungary Neurobiology
- Adila Elobeid, Sudan Medicine
- Selena Giménez Ibánez, Spain Plant Molecular Genetics
- Emma Gray, South Africa Ecology
- Jingmei Li, Singapore Human Genetics
- Sandra López-Verges, Panama Virology
- Farah Ouechtati, Tunisia Neuroscience
- Mio Ozawa, Japan Nutritional Epidemiology
- Tania Pozzo, Bolivia Biotechnology
- Bhama Ramkhelawon, Mauritius Obesity and diabetes
- Gul Shahnaz, Pakistan Pharmaceutical and Biomedical Science
- Alia Shatanawi, Jordan Cardiovascular Pharmacology
- Aramide Dolapo O Shingboye, Nigeria Food science
- Ahu Arslan Yildiz, Turkey Biotechnology

== International Rising Talents laureates ==
=== 2015 ===
Established in 2015, the International Rising Talent Grants are awarded annually to 15 PhD students and post-doctoral Fellows. Fellows are chosen from among the winners of the 236 fellowships awarded locally by L’Oréal subsidiaries and UNESCO around the world, to give additional support at the international level to promising young women researchers. They replace the former International Fellowships. The 2015 International Rising Talents are:

- Nourtan Abdeltawab, Egypt Immunogenetics of Infectious Diseases
- Carolina Andrade, Brazil Medicinal Chemistry
- Aurore Avarguès-Weber, France Cognitive Neurosciences
- Yoke-Fun Chan/Chan Yoke-Fun, (Chan is the surname) Malaysia Molecular virology
- Vanessa D’Costa, Canada Immunogenetics of Infectious Diseases
- Kathryn Holt, Australia Pathogen Genomic Epidemiology
- Matilde Jiménez Coello, Mexico Infectious Diseases
- Adriana Marais, South Africa Physics, Quantum Biology
- Signe Normand, Denmark Plant Ecology, Macroecology, Biogeography
- Eva M. Pellicer, Spain Materials Science, Nanotechnology
- Trần Hà Liên Phương, Vietnam Pharmaceutical sciences
- Bhama Ramkhelawon, United States Medicine (diabetes and obesity)
- Sanaa Sharafeddine, Lebanon Computer and Communications Engineering
- Mary Stoddard, United States Organismic and Evolutionary Biology, Ornithology
- Ariela Vergara Jaque, Chile Computational Structural Biology

=== 2016 ===
The L’Oréal-UNESCO For Women in Science programme established the International Rising Talent Grants, awarded annually to 15 PhD students and post-doctoral Fellows who are chosen among the former winners of the 236 fellowships awarded locally by L’Oréal subsidiaries and UNESCO around the world. The goal is to support promising women researchers and give them more visibility so that, through the awards, these young scientists can achieve the increased recognition that their talent deserve, but dod not always receive, both within their country and by their peers. International Rising Talents are chosen from countries in each world region, Africa & Arab States, Asia-Pacific, Europe, Latin America and North America. The 2016 L'Oréal-UNESCO International Rising Talents are:

Technology and engineering: innovations that could change the face of medicine
- Eszter Farkas (Hungary) Biological Sciences
- Jasmeen Merzaban (Saudi Arabia) Biological Sciences
- Yilun Ying (China) Chemistry
- Elisa Orth (Brazil) Chemistry

Physical sciences: a profound impact on our world

- Dorthe Ravnsbæk (Denmark) Chemistry
- Sabrina Stierwalt (United States) Astronomical and space sciences

The study of galaxy mergers with implications for a new understanding of how galaxies evolve

- María del Rocío Vega Frutis (Mexico) Biological sciences

Life and environmental sciences: critical issues for the future of our planet

- Ira Didenkulova (Russia) Physics
- Anaïs Orsi (France) Earth sciences
- Habiba Alsafar (United Arab Emirates) Medical engineering

Solutions in health sciences through modern medicine

- María J. Buzón (Spain) Biological sciences
- Hiba El Hajj (Lebanon) Clinical medicine
- Risa Mukai (Japan) Biological sciences
- Bernadeta Szewczyk (Poland) Biological sciences
- Elena J. Tucker (Australia) Biological sciences

=== 2017 ===
In 2014, the L’Oréal-UNESCO programme has established the International Rising Talent Grants, awarded annually to 15 PhD students and post-doctoral Fellows. These young researchers are chosen among the former winners of the 250 fellowships awarded locally by L’Oréal subsidiaries and UNESCO Field Offices around the world. By recognizing their achievements at a key moment in their careers, the For Women in Science programme aims to help them pursue their research.

Watching the brain at work
- Doctor Lorina Naci, Canada, Fundamental medicine. In a coma: is the patient conscious or unconscious?
- Associate Professor Muireann Irish, Australia, Clinical medicine. Recognizing Alzheimer’s before the first signs appear.

On the road to conceiving new medical treatments

- Doctor Hyun Lee, Germany, Biological Sciences. Neurodegenerative diseases: untangling aggregated proteins.
- Doctor Nam-Kyung Yu, Republic of Korea, Biological Sciences, Rett syndrome: neuronal cells come under fire
- Doctor Stephanie Fanucchi, South Africa, Biological Sciences. Better understanding the immune system.
- Doctor Julia Etulain, Argentina, Biological Sciences. Better tissue healing.

Finding potential new sources of drugs

- Doctor Rym Ben Sallem, Tunisia, Biological Sciences. New antibiotics are right under our feet.
- Doctor Hab. Joanna Sułkowska, Poland, Biological Sciences. Unraveling the secrets of entangled proteins.

Getting to the heart of matter

- Ms Nazek El-Atab, United Arab Emirates, Electrical, Electronic and Computer Engineering. Miniaturizing electronics without losing memory.
- Doctor Bilge Demirköz, Turkey, Physics. Piercing the secrets of cosmic radiation.
- Doctor Tamara Elzein, Lebanon, Material Sciences. Trapping radioactivity.
- Doctor Ran Long, China, Chemistry. Unlocking the potential of energy resources with nanochemistry.

Examining the past to shed light on the future – or vice versa

- Doctor Fernanda Werneck, Brazil, Biological Sciences. Predicting how animal biodiversity will evolve.
- Doctor Sam Giles, United Kingdom, Biological Sciences. Taking another look at the evolution of vertebrates thanks to their braincases.
- Doctor Ágnes Kóspál, Hungary, Astronomy and Space Sciences. Looking at the birth of distant suns and planets to better understand the solar system.

=== 2018 ===
Each year, the International Rising Talents programme selects the 15 most promising women scientists among the 275 national and regional fellows of the L’Oréal-UNESCO For Women In Science programme.

- Areej Abuhammad (Jordan) Fundamental medicine
- Danielle Twilley (South Africa) Biological Sciences, medicinal plant sciences
- Hanifa Taher Al Blooshi (United Arab Emirates) Chemical Engineering
- Ibtissem Guefrachi (Tunisia) Microbiology
- Weang Kee Ho (Malaysia) Heath sciences, epidemiological statistics
- Hiep Thi Nguyen (Vietnam) Medical engineering
- Yukiko Ogawa (Japan) Material engineering
- Radha Boya (United Kingdom) Physics
- Agnieszka Gajewicz (Poland) Chemistry
- Anna Kudryavtseva (Russia) Biological sciences
- Associate Duygu Sag (Turkey) Biological sciences, immunology
- Ai Ing Lim (United States of America) Fundamental medicine
- Selene Lizbeth Fernández Valverde (Mexico) Biological sciences and genomics
- Rafaela Salgado Ferreira (Brazil) Chemistry
- Anela Choy (United States of America) Biological sciences, oceanography
- Dr. Priscilla Kolibea Mante (Ghana) Neurosciences

=== 2019 ===
Among the 275 national and regional fellowship winners supported each year, the For Women in Science programme selects the 15 most promising researchers for this international recognition.

Africa and the Arab States
- Saba Al Heialy – Health sciences (L'Oréal-UNESCO regional fellowship Dubai), Mohammed Bin Rashid University for Medicine and Health Sciences
- Zohra Dhouafli – Neuroscience/ Biochemistry (L'Oréal-UNESCO regional fellowship Tunisia), Center of Biotechnology of Borj-Cédria
- Menattallah Elserafy – Molecular biology/Genetics (L'Oréal-UNESCO regional fellowship Egypt), Zewail City of Science and Technology
- Priscilla Kolibea Mante – Neurosciences (L'Oréal-UNESCO regional fellowship Ghana), Kwame Nkrumah University of Science and Technology

North America

- Jacquelyn Cragg – Health sciences (L'Oréal-UNESCO regional fellowship Canada), University of British Columbia

Latin America

- Maria Molina – Chemistry/Molecular biology (L'Oréal-UNESCO regional fellowship Argentina), National University of Rio Cuarto
- Ana Sofía Varela – Chemistry/Electrocatalysis (L'Oréal-UNESCO regional fellowship Mexico), Institute of Chemistry, National Autonomous University of Mexico

Asia-Pacific

- Sherry Aw – Neuroscience (L'Oréal-UNESCO regional fellowship Singapore), Institute of Molecular and Cell Biology
- Mika Nomoto – Molecular biology / Plant pathology (L'Oréal-UNESCO regional fellowship Japan), University of Nagoya
- Mary Jacquiline Romero – Quantum physics (L'Oréal-UNESCO regional fellowship Australia), University of Queensland

Europe

- Laura Elo – Bioinformatics (L'Oréal-UNESCO regional fellowship Finland), University of Turku and Åbo Akademi University
- Kirsten Marie Ørnsbjerg Jensen – Material chemistry, structural analysis (L'Oréal-UNESCO regional fellowship Denmark), University of Copenhagen
- Biola María Javierre Martínez – Genomics (L'Oréal-UNESCO regional fellowship Spain), Josep Carreras Leukaemia Research Institute
- Urte Neniskyte – Neuroscience (L'Oréal-UNESCO regional fellowship Lithuania), University of Vilnius
- Nurcan Tuncbag – Bioinformatics (L'Oréal-UNESCO regional fellowship Turkey), Middle East Technical University

=== 2020 ===
Among the national and regional fellowship winners supported each year, the For Women in Science programme selects the 15 most promising researchers for this international recognition.

Africa and the Arab States
- Dr Laura-Joy Boulos – Neuroscience. Levant, Saint-Joseph University, Lebanon
- Dr Nowsheen Goonoo – Biomedicine. Sub-Saharan Africa, University of Mauritius
- Dr Nouf Mahmoud – Health Sciences. Levant, Al-Zaytoonah University of Jordan
- Georgina Nyawo – Molecular Biology, Medical Microbiology. Sub-Saharan Africa, Stellenbosch University, South Africa

North America

- Dr Elizabeth Trembath-Reichert – Earth Science /Environmental Science. United States of America, Arizona State University

Latin America

- Dr Paula Giraldo Gallo – Physics. Colombia, University of the Andes
- Dr Patrícia Medeiros – Biological sciences. Brazil, Federal University of Alagoas

Asia-Pacific

- Dr Rui Bai – Biological sciences. China, Westlake University
- Dr Huanqian Loh – Physics. Singapore, National University of Singapore
- Dr Mikyung Shin – Biomaterials. Republic of Korea, Sungkyunkwan University

Europe

- Dr Vida Engmann – Material Engineering. Denmark, University of Southern Denmark
- Dr Serap Erkek – Molecular biology / Epigenetics. Turkey, Cancer Epigenomics Laboratory, Biomedicine and Genome Center
- Dr Jennifer Garden – Chemistry. United Kingdom, University of Edinburgh
- Dr Cristina Romera Castillo – Marine sciences. Spain, Institute of Sea Sciences
- Dr Olena Vaneeva – Mathematics. Ukraine, Institute of Mathematics of the National Academy of Science of Ukraine

=== 2022 ===
Africa and the Arabs states
- Lina Dahabiyeh, Basic medicine, The University of Jordan, Jordan
- Ndeye Maty Ndiaye, Material engineering, Cheikh Anta Diop University, Dakar, Senegal
- Waad Saftly, Physics, Al-Baath University, Syria

Asia and the Pacific

- So Young Choi, Industrial biotechnology, Korea Advanced Institute of Science and Technology, South Korea
- Van Thi Thanh Ho, Chemical engineering, Hochiminh City University of Natural Resources and Environment, Vietnam
- Pantana Tor-ngern, Earth and related environmental sciences, Chulalongkorn University, Thailand
- Daria Smirnova, Physics, Institute of Applied Physics of the Russian Academy of Sciences, Russia

Europe

- Natalia Bruno, Physics, National Institute of Optics of the National Research Council, Italy
- Karolina Mikulska-Ruminska, Physics, Nicolaus Copernicus University, Poland
- Ieva Plikusiene, Chemistry, Vilnius University, Lithuania
- Beatriz Villarroel, Physics, Stockholm University, Sweden

Latin America and the Caribbean

- Maria Florencia Cayrol, Biological science, Institute of Biomedical Research - UCA - CONICET, Argentina
- Irene del Real, Earth and related environmental sciences, Austral University, Chile

North America

- Daphné Lemasquerier, Physics, University of Texas at Austin, United States of America
- Alison McAfee, Biological science, University of British Columbia and North Carolina State University, Canada
