= Biola Javierre =

Spanish biologist and biochemist (born 1983)

- Born: Biola María Javierre Martínez; 1983 (age 42–43); Sabiñánigo, Huesca, Spain
- Education: University of Navarra; Autonomous University of Madrid
- Known for: Research on genome organization and leukemia
- Scientific career
- Fields: Epigenetics; functional genomics
- Workplaces: Josep Carreras Leukaemia Research Institute; Babraham Institute; Spanish National Cancer Research Centre

Biola María Javierre Martínez (born 1983) is a Spanish biologist and biochemist who leads a research group at the Josep Carreras Leukaemia Research Institute in Barcelona, where her work concerns three-dimensional genome organization and epigenomic regulation. She was named one of the 2019 L'Oréal-UNESCO International Rising Talents and received the 2026 Gabriella Morreale National Research Award for Young Researchers in Medicine and Health Sciences.

== Early life and education ==
Javierre was born in Sabiñánigo, Huesca, in 1983. Her father was a science teacher, and she became interested in science while spending time in his school laboratory. She completed degrees in biology and biochemistry at the University of Navarra, followed by a doctorate in molecular biology at the Autonomous University of Madrid.

== Career ==
Javierre conducted research at the Spanish National Cancer Research Centre (CNIO) before moving to the Babraham Institute in Cambridge, where she worked on a technique for identifying the regulatory sequences that control gene activity in particular cell types. In 2018, she joined the Josep Carreras Leukaemia Research Institute, where she leads a research group on three-dimensional chromatin and gene regulation.

Her team later developed low-input Capture Hi-C (liCHi-C), which maps promoter interactions at high resolution in small cell populations and has been used to examine blood-cell differentiation and leukemia. In 2025, she received €1.25 million from CRIS Contra el Cáncer for a project on B-cell acute lymphoblastic leukemia and the role of less-studied DNA regions in relapse.

== Public commentary ==
In 2019, Javierre criticised the limited visibility of women in science and the lack of research funding in Spain.

== Awards ==
In 2019, L'Oréal-UNESCO selected Javierre as one of its 15 International Rising Talents, and the eighth edition of Top 100 Mujeres Líderes en España included her among its ten health-sector figures. In February 2026, FRACE and Mastercard named her the winner in biology and geology at their sixth Young Female Scientific Talent Awards for her research on three-dimensional genome organization and epigenomic regulation. On 27 October 2026, King Felipe VI presented her with the 2026 Gabriella Morreale National Research Award for Young Researchers in Medicine and Health Sciences, in recognition of her work in epigenetics and functional genomics.
