= Atatürk High School of Science, Istanbul =

Coordinates: 40°59′20″N 29°3′9″E

- İstanbul Atatürk Fen Lisesi
- Kadıköy, Istanbul; Turkey

Information
- Type: Public, Boarding
- Established: 1982; 44 years ago
- Principal: Dr. Metin Toprak
- Campus: Urban (10 acres)
- Color: Red Gray
- Abbreviations: AHSS and İAFL
- Website: https://iafl.meb.k12.tr/

Atatürk High School of Science, Istanbul (Turkish: İstanbul Atatürk Fen Lisesi) is the second science high school established in Turkey, following the founding of Ankara High School of Science in 1964. It was established in 1982 by a presidential directive under the framework of the Science High School Project. The school is a co-educational, public boarding institution located in Kuyubaşı, Kadıköy, Istanbul, adjacent to the Marmara University campus.

The institution’s primary objective is to educate academically gifted students to help meet the national demand for professionals in science, engineering, and medicine.

== Faculty ==
Faculty members at Istanbul Atatürk High School of Science are appointed through a centralized selection process and are typically drawn from educators with strong academic records in their respective disciplines. In addition to subject instruction, the teaching approach emphasizes the development of analytical thinking and familiarity with scientific reasoning.

The curriculum is designed to provide students with an intensive education in science and mathematics. During the first two years, students complete coursework that encompasses the three-year national high school curriculum in these subjects. In the final year, students take advanced courses that support engagement in research activities and offer preparation for introductory university-level studies. The academic program also aligns with the requirements of the national university entrance examination administered by the Council of Higher Education.

== Curriculum and student life ==
At Istanbul Atatürk High School of Science, foreign language instruction is an integral part of the curriculum alongside science education. Upon admission, students take a placement exam to determine their proficiency in English, German, or French, and each student is enrolled in at least one of these language courses.

Class sizes are limited to a maximum of 30 students, aiming to encourage active participation and classroom engagement. Laboratory and library facilities support the academic program by providing resources that complement theoretical instruction with practical applications. The school maintains laboratories for physics, chemistry, biology, computer science, and languages, which are equipped with contemporary instructional materials. These facilities are accessible to students beyond scheduled class hours.

The school offers a range of extracurricular activities through student-led clubs. These clubs organize various cultural and social events, including excursions, theatrical performances, and concert attendance. The school includes a 600-seat auditorium, which hosts student theater productions, as well as a conference room used for academic and ceremonial events. Recreational facilities include outdoor spaces for football, basketball, and volleyball. A music room is also available for students interested in musical pursuits.

The school's parent association, known as Koruma Derneği, works in cooperation with the school administration to provide support for educational and extracurricular activities.

Graduates of İAFL may become members of the Istanbul Atatürk High School of Science Alumni Association (AFLİM). The association facilitates communication among alumni and organizes events such as annual gatherings and end-of-year celebrations. AFLİM also supports current students through scholarship programs and mentorship opportunities.

== Notable alumni ==
- Duygu Sag, Turkish immunologist
- Sema Salur, Turkish-American mathematician, currently at the University of Rochester.
- Ozge Samanci, Turkish-American media artist, currently at the Northwestern University
- Ahmet Yıldız, Turkish-American professor of physics and molecular cell biology at the University of California, Berkeley
- Seyfi Teoman, Turkish film director, screenwriter and producer
