= Spaan =

Spaan or van Spaan is a Dutch surname. Notable people with the surname include:

- Edith Hemaspaandra (née Spaan), Dutch-American theoretical computer scientist
- Gerrit van Spaan (1654–1711), Dutch writer
- Hans Spaan (born 1958), Dutch motorcycle racer
- Henk Spaan (born 1948), Dutch sports journalist
- Johannie Maria Spaan, South African wildlife biologist
- Machiel Spaan (born 1966), Dutch architect

== See also ==
- Jeroen Spaans (born 1973), Dutch rower
