= Nurcan =

Nurcan is a Turkish feminine given name. Notable people with the name include:

== Given name ==
- Nurcan Baysal (born 1975), Turkish journalist
- Nurcan Çarkçı, Turkish boxer
- Nurcan Çelik (1980–2026), Turkish footballer and football club owner
- Nurcan Taylan (born 1983), Turkish Olympic, world and European champion in weightlifting
- Nurcan Tunçbağ, Turkish academic
