= Urtė =

- Gender: Female
- Language: Lithuanian

Origin
- Region of origin: Lithuania

Other names
- Derived: Dorotėja

Urtė is a Lithuanian feminine given name. People bearing the name Urtė include:

- Urtė Juodvalkytė (born 1986), Lithuanian road cyclist
- Urtė Kazakevičiūtė (born 1993), Lithuanian swimmer
- Urtė Neniškytė (born 1983), Lithuanian neuroscientist
