= Justine Germo Nzweundji =

Cameroonian plant biologist

- Born: June 1, 1977 (age 49); Loum, cameroon
- Citizenship: Cameroon
- Education: University of Yaoundé I,University of Florida, University of Michigan
- Known for: Cultivation techniques for Prunus africana
- Spouse(s): Nkem Khumbah (m, - 2024)
- Awards: L'Oréal-UNESCO For Women in Science Fellowship
- Scientific career
- Fields: Plant biotechnology

Justine Germo Nzweundji (born June 1, 1977) is a plant biotechnologist from Cameroon. She is the founder and president of FOFFSA, as well as the former president of the Cameroon Academy of Young Scientists. In 2011, she became a fellow of the L'Oréal-UNESCO For Women in Science Awards.

== Education ==
Nzweundji received her doctorate from the University of Yaoundé. During her studies, she also conducted research at the University of Florida Tropical Research and Educational Center and at Alabama A&M University between 2011 and 2013. Her work abroad from Cameroon was supported in part by a L'Oréal-UNESCO For Women in Science fellowship.

Nzweundji's doctoral thesis was on the topic on Prunus africana, a tree which is harvested for medicinal products made from its bark. In addition to its long history in traditional medicine, it may potentially be used as part of a treatment for prostate cancer. Nzweundji worked on developing a technique to harvest sustainably, providing long-term income for the local community while maintaining a healthy tree population. Over-exploitation is a threat to the trees in the wild, so for large industrial projects Nzweundji has considered the use of in-vitro production to preserve as many live trees as possible.

== Career ==
In 2022 Nzweundji received the University of Michigan African Presidential Scholars (UMAPS) for a project on Science policy. Nzweundji 2018, accepted a postdoctoral fellowship to work at Hochschule Geisenheim University. She currently works at the Institute of Medical Research and Medicinal Plants Studies/Ministry of Scientific Research and Innovation in Cameroon. She began working there during her studies and returned after research projects abroad. She continues to investigate Prunus africana.

Nzweundji has participated in international science forums. She is keen to engage and mentor other young scientists and took on the role of president for the Cameroon Academy of Young Scientists. She organises public speaking events to foster science communication and outreach based on the "Three-minute thesis" format.

Nzweundji is also sits on the steering committee for the International Network for Government Science Advice (INGSA) Africa since 2016. Nzweundji has collaborated with international researchers to discuss scholarly communication, as well as inequities in research and how they are exacerbated by COVID-19.

== Awards and honours ==
- 2016 National finalist for "ma thèse en 180 secondes" in Cameroon.
- 2015 Junior researcher prize at the Institute of Medical Research and Medicinal Plants Studies.
- 2011 Fellow of the L'Oréal-UNESCO For Women in Science Awards.
- 2022 Fellow of the University of Michigan African Presidential Scholars (UMAPS)
