= Ari Melnick =

Argentine-born physician and biomedical researcher

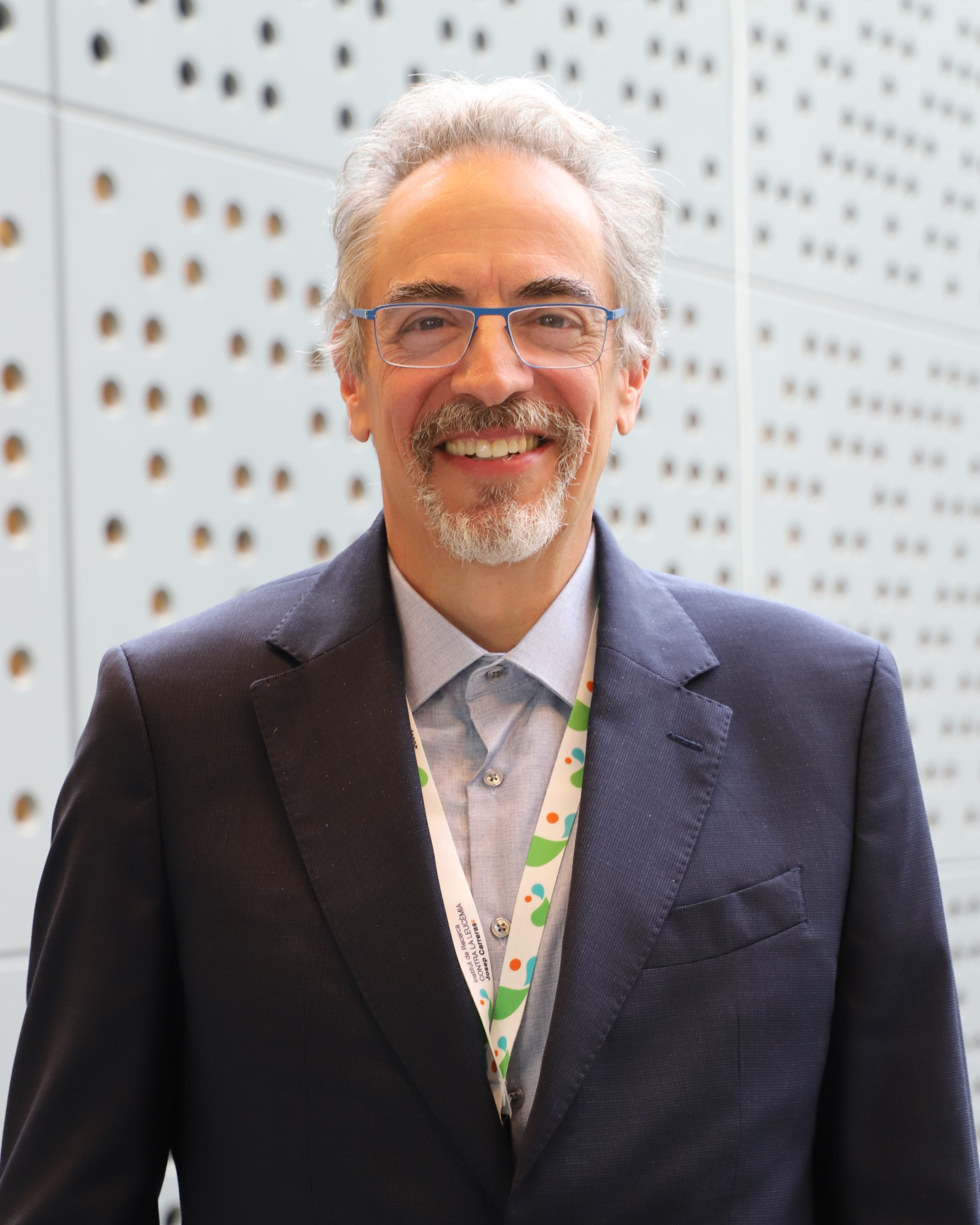

Ari Melnick is an Argentine-born physician and biomedical researcher specialising in haematological malignancies and cancer epigenetics. Since 2025, he is the Director of the Josep Carreras Leukaemia Research Institute in Spain.

== Education ==
Melnick studied medicine at the University of Buenos Aires, graduating in 1990. He subsequently continued his professional and academic career in the United States.

== Career ==
Melnick has held positions at the Mount Sinai School of Medicine in New York and later joined Weill Cornell Medicine. At Weill Cornell he directs the Haematologic Malignancies Research Program, a role he has combined since 2013 with his appointment as Gebroe Family Professor of Haematology/Oncology. In 2025 he was appointed Director of the Josep Carreras Leukaemia Research Institute.

== Research ==
Melnick is an international reference in the fields of blood cancers and cancer epigenetics. He played a leading role in one of the first large-scale epigenomic studies in humans. Through this and subsequent research, Melnick and collaborators demonstrated that aberrant epigenetic programming is a hallmark of cancer and that epigenetic diversity contributes significantly to tumour fitness and unfavorable patient outcomes.

His therapeutic approaches have been approved by the United States Food and Drug Administration or advanced to phase III clinical trials.

== Awards and honours ==
In recognition of his contributions to translational research in haematology, Melnick received the Ernest Beutler Prize in Translational Research from the American Society of Hematology.

Melnick is a member of the Board of Directors of the Leukemia and Lymphoma Society and the Lymphoma Research Foundation.
