= Isabel Cristina Chinchilla Soto =

Costa Rican researcher

Isabel Cristina Chinchilla Soto is a researcher in environmental science, agronomy and agricultural plant science who works at the Centro de Investigación en Contaminación Ambiental (CICA). In 2011, she was selected as a fellow for the Women in Science International Fellows in Ecology for Costa Rica. She is an author of articles published in the Central American repository for research, known as the SIIDCA-CSUCA. She is listed as one of the "Outstanding women scientists to receive 2011 L’ORÉAL-UNESCO Awards (3 March) and Fellowships (2 March)". She is an instructor at the University of Costa Rica. She studied pollution and contamination of the environment.
