= Osnat Penn =

Israeli computational biologist

Osnat Penn (Hebrew: אסנת פן; born in 1981), is an Israeli computational biologist whose work focuses on molecular evolution, cell research, and immunoinformatics. She is the third Israeli scientist in three years to win the UNESCO-L'Oréal fellowship, which she received in 2013 for her work on the genetic origins of autism. Penn is currently a postdoctorate fellow at the University of Washington in Seattle, where she has been working since 2012.

== Life and work ==
Penn holds three degrees from Tel-Aviv University in Israel. She completed a Bachelor of Science in Biology and Computer Science, specializing in bioinformatics. She also completed a Master's degree in Molecular biology and a Ph.D. in Computational Biology, both with the department of cell research and immunology. Her Ph.D. thesis was titled "Computational methods for sequence analysis of HIV evolutionary dynamics," and was supervised by Tel-Aviv professor Tal Pupko.

Penn previously worked at Tel-Aviv University as a teaching assistant for the course Introduction to Bioinformatics between 2006 and 2009. She also taught several bioinformatics and biological sequence analysis courses at Tel-Aviv between 2007 and 2011.

=== Career ===
Penn has been responsible for several different computer programs developed at Tel Aviv University in order to aid in biological research. She developed GUIDANCE, a web server used for estimating alignment confidence scores, with the support of the Converging Technologies Program. RASER, the RAte Shift EstimatoR, is used to test site-specific evolutionary rate shifts and identify the specific sites and lineages in which the shifts likely occur. The Pepitope Server is used to map epitopes using affinity-selected peptides.

Her work with autism genetic sequencing, which won her the UNESCO-L'Oréal award and a grant of $40,000 to further her studies, worked to identify genetic variations in autistic children that differed from genome sequences in non-autistic parents. It contributed to research on the genetic complexity of autism, especially in instances where there is no family history of the condition (sporadic autism). Her work may lead to prenatal screening and early diagnosis of autism, as well as the development of gene therapy as an interventional treatment.

=== Publications ===
Penn has been published in Cell, Genome Research, Molecular Biology and Evolution, Nucleic Acids Research, Systematic Biology, BMC Evolutionary Biology, PLoS Computational Biology, Bioinformatics, Proteins, Genome Medicine, Nature, Frontiers in Molecular Biosciences, Nature Ecology and Evolution, Genome Biology, American Journal of Human Genetics and Protein Engineering, Design and Selection.
