= Katharine Michie =

Australian physicist

- Education: University of Sydney
- Scientific career
- Fields: Biochemistry Structural Biology Biophysics
- Workplaces: Medical Research Council (2006–2010); University of Sydney (2012–2015); University of New South Wales (2015–present)
- Thesis: Functional characterisation of cell division in Bacillus subtilis (2004)

Katharine Arwen Michie is an Australian structural biologist, biochemist and physicist. In 2005 she was named a Fellow of the L'Oréal-UNESCO Awards for Women in Science and was also awarded a Marie Curie International Research Fellowship in January, 2006. Michie is currently in charge of the Structural Biology X-ray Facility, a part of the Mark Wainwright Analytical Centre, at the University of New South Wales, Sydney.

== Biography ==
Michie completed both her BSc Hons and doctoral degree at the University of Sydney. In 2005 she received a L'Oréal-UNESCO Fellowship and spent the next five years working with Jan Löwe at the Medical Research Council (United Kingdom) in Cambridge, England. She carried out research into the structure and function of Structural Maintenance of Chromosome (SMC) complexes and how they exert molecular control over the topological and spatial organization of chromosomes. The following year, Michie received a Marie Curie Incoming Postdoctoral Fellowship and continued working on SMC proteins and within the bacterial cell division field which continued her position at the Medical Research Council (United Kingdom). It was during this time Michie published a number of first author papers on bacterial cell division and cytoskeletons. From 2007 to 2010, Michie was a research associate at St John's College, Cambridge, UK. And in her final year in the UK, her position at the Medical Research Council (United Kingdom) became that of an Investigator Scientist. She returned to Australia in 2012, initially to the University of Sydney and then from 2015, the University of New South Wales, Sydney. At UNSW she a Senior Research Associate of the Protein Structure Laboratory and runs the Structural Biology X-ray Facility.
