= Triin Vahisalu =

Estonian botanist

- Born: October 4, 1978 (age 47)
- Education: University of Tartu; University of Helsinki
- Awards: Fellowship, L'Oréal-UNESCO For Women in Science Awards 2011
- Scientific career
- Fields: Botany
- Thesis: Plant guard cell anion channel SLAC1 regulates stomatal closure (2010)

Triin Vahisalu (born October 4, 1978) is an Estonian botanist. She studies the effects of stress on plants and discovered a gene that regulates stomata in harsh environments.

== Education ==
Vahisalu attended the University of Tartu for her undergraduate degree in biology between 1997 and 2004 and stayed on until 2005 for her master's.

Vahisalu completed her doctorate in plant biology at the University of Helsinki, though her research was in collaboration with the University of Tartu. In 2011, she received a fellowship from the L'Oréal-UNESCO For Women in Science Awards which supported her research outside Estonia. She was the first winner from the Baltic States.

== Career and research ==
Vahisalu's primary research interests are the effects of varying environmental conditions on crops. She has investigated how plant stomata open and close in drought conditions or under exposure to ozone. When under stress, plants close their stomata to limit exposure to the surrounding atmosphere. She has identified a gene and an associated protein responsible for stoma regulation in Arabidopsis plants. This was achieved by comparing different mutations with varying sensitivity to ozone. Her work could lead to the development of plants that are more resilient in harsh environments. An article about this discovery was published in the high-profile journal Nature.

Vahisalu continues to work at the Universities of Tartu and Helsinki as a post-doctoral fellow. In 2019, she was involved in a conference called "Plants in a Changing World".

== Awards and honours ==
- 2011 Fellow from L'Oréal-UNESCO For Women in Science. She was praised by President Toomas Hendrik Ilves for her contributions to science on the occasion of her receiving this award.
- 2011 Best Doctoral Thesis at the University of Tartu.
- 2010 Estonian National Research Award.

== Personal life ==
Vahisalu is married and has a child.
