= Signe Normand =

Danish biologist (born 1979)

Signe Normand (born 26 June 1979) is a Danish biologist and educator, specializing in vegetation ecology. Since February 2014, she has been an assistant professor at Aarhus University specializing in Danish flora and vegetation. In March 2015, in recognition for her research on vegetation in the Arctic tundra, she received an International Rising Talent Fellowship, one of the L'Oréal-UNESCO Awards for Women in Science.

== Biography ==
Normand became interested in natural history as a child when her grandfather, a biology teacher in Esbjerg, took her for walks through the woods, fields and marshes surrounding the family summerhouse in the little seaside resort of Blåvand in south-western Jutland. She learnt the Latin names of the various plants and creatures, remembering them by creating rhymes. She attended a boarding school where biology was a constant interest and, after finishing high school in Denmark, spent a year experiencing nature and outdoor life while at a folk high school in Norway.

On her return to Denmark, Normand studied biology at Aarhus University graduating in 2004. She earned a master's degree in 2006 and a doctorate in 2010 under Jens-Christian Svenning concentrating throughout on the distribution and diversity patterns of European flora.

Unlike many of those who earn their doctorates, Normand was keen to continue her research and travels. Despite being married (to the Swiss biologist Urs A. Treirer) and having a baby, she travelled with her family to America and Switzerland where she was able to complete her Post Doc at the Swiss Federal Institute for Forest, Snow and Landscape Research in 2014. During her four years in Switzerland, her husband was able to find work as a teacher.

Normand was awarded the L'Oréal-UNESCO prize for her research into changes in the vegetation of the Arctic tundra, especially those caused by the effects of global warming on the flora of Greenland. Until recently, knowledge in the area was based primarily on satellite imaging or field studies but Normand was able to provide a much more detailed picture by making use of photography from the low-flying drones she guided over the regions investigated.

== Selected publications ==
- Normand, S; Rickets, R.E.; Skov F- (2011). "Postglacial migration supplements climate in determining plant species ranges in Europe". Proceedings. Biological Sciences. 278 (1725). Proceedings of the Royal Society B, 278: 3644-3653: 3644–3653. doi:10.1098/rspb.2010.2769. PMC 3203492. PMID 21543356.
- Normand, S.; Trier U.A.; Ordgaard, B.V. (2011). "Tree refugia and slow forest development in response to post-LGM warming in North-Eastern European Russia". Frontiers of Biogeography. 2.4.
- Svenning J-C: Normand, S.; Skov, F. (2009). "Plio-Pleistocene climate change and geographic heterogeneity in plant diversity-environment relationships". Ecography. 32.
- Treier, U.A.; Normand, S. (2015). "Arctic tundra in change / Die arktische Tundra wandelt sich". Kennzeichen DK. 104.
