= Fadzai Zengeya =

GIS researcher and academic

Fadzai M. Zengeya
- Education: University of Zimbabwe.
- Scientific career
- Fields: GIS applications to conservation and agriculture
- Thesis: The Distribution of Cattle and Their Interaction with the African Buffalo at the Wildlife-Livestock Interface Understood Using Real-Time Global Positioning Systems (GPS) and Remotely Sensed Data. (2014)

Fadzai M. Zengeya is a senior lecturer at the University of Zimbabwe. After a B.Sc. degree in Environmental Science, specialising in pollution science, Zengeya studied as a PhD student in agriculture at the Faculty of Science and Agriculture, University of KwaZulu-Natal, Scottsville, (South Africa). She graduated from University of Zimbabwe in 2014 with a D.Phil. in Geographical Information Science and Earth Observation (Spatial Ecology). She used the Gonarezhou National Park and its surroundings as her study area. Her research focuses on applications of global navigation satellite systems in conservation and movement ecology and also their application for natural resource management.

== Publications ==
Zengeya is the author or co-author of over 25 scientific publications. These include:

- Mark Zvidzai, Fadzai Michelle Zengeya, Mhosisi Masocha, Henry Ndaimani and Amon Murwira (2022) Application of GPS occurrence data to understand African white-backed vultures Gyps africanus spatial home range overlaps. Ecology and Evolution 12 (4) e8778.
- Sithabile Moyo, Isaiah Gwitira, Amon Murwira, Fadzai M. Zengeya and Munyaradzi D. Shekede (2019) Spatial distribution and abundance of the African baobab (Adansonia digitata) in Zimbabwe. Transactions of the Royal Society of South Africa, 74 (3) pp 213–218.
- Isaiah Gwitira, Amon Murwira, Fadzai M. Zengeya and Munyaradzi Davis Shekede (2018) Application of GIS to predict malaria hotspots based on Anopheles arabiensis habitat suitability in Southern Africa, International Journal of Applied Earth Observation and Geoinformation, 64 pp 12–21.
- Fadzai M. Zengeya, Onisimo Mutanga and Amon Murwira (2013) Linking remotely sensed forage quality estimates from WorldView-2 multispectral data with cattle distribution in a savanna landscape. International Journal of Applied Earth Observation and Geoinformation 21 pp 513–524

== Awards ==
Shw was awarded a Unesco-L’Oreal Co-Sponsored Fellowship for Women in Life Sciences, one of 15 women selected for a programme of young talent from Africa and the Arab States in 2011. She undertook a project about understanding the spatial distribution of cattle and the African buffalo at the livestock, wildlife interface using GPS and satellite data at University of KwaZulu-Natal, Scottsville, (South Africa).
