= Lorina Naci =

Canadian neuroscientist

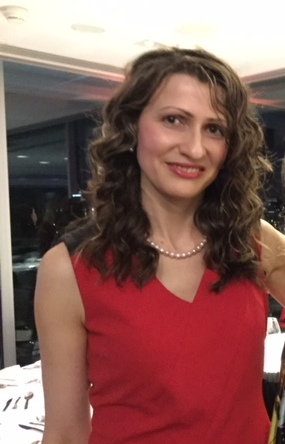
Dr. Lorina Naci

Dr. Lorina Naci is an Albanian-Canadian psychologist and neuroscientist born in Tirana. She is a laureate of the "Young International Talent" scholarship of the L'Oréal-UNESCO program for women and science in 2017. In 2023 she was elected a fellow of Trinity College Dublin.

== Biography ==
Born in Tirana, Lorina Naci studied in Albania and then, thanks to a scholarship, at an American university, the University of Georgia in Athens, before obtaining a prize with a scholarship to study in England at the University of Cambridge. She earned a doctorate in science and a research position at the University of Western Ontario in London, Ontario, to work at the Western Brain and Mind Institute with neuroscientist Adrian Owen. She married a Canadian scientist with whom she works.

In 2017, she won an International Talent Award for the L'Oréal-UNESCO For Women in Science program. Lorina Naci joined the Global Brain Health Institute in Dublin in 2017 and became assistant professor of psychology at Trinity College Dublin.

== Works ==
In 2013, she and Adrian Owen developed a method for communicating with patients in a persistent vegetative state. A patient with this condition was located within a functional magnetic resonance imaging scanner, and neuro-imagery was used perceived to amount to answers to several simple yes/no questions.

In 2014, through a second method, the Canadian team also screened a film by Alfred Hitchcock to a group of healthy volunteers and two patients in coma. Then, by analyzing the cerebral activity of both by functional MRI, the team found that the brain of one of the coma patients, a young man, reacted to the film much as did a healthy person; on the other hand, no activity was found in the brain of the other patient, a young woman.

Owen and Naci's work has attracted international attention from the world's media; it was reported in many hundreds of newspapers around the world (including twice on the front page of the New York Times and other quality journals) and has been widely discussed on television (e.g. BBC News, Channel 4 News, ITN News, Sky News, CNN), radio (e.g. BBC World Service) 'Outlook' documentary, NPR Radio (USA), BBC Radio 1, 2, 3 and 4), in print (e.g. full featured articles in The New Yorker The Times, The Sunday Times, The Observer Magazine etc.) and online (including Nature, Science and The Guardian podcasts). To date, the discovery has featured prominently in 6 television documentaries including 60 Minutes (USA), Panorama BBC Special Report (UK), Inside Out (BBC TV series) (UK), and CBC The National (Canada).
