= Loum =

Loum or LOUM may refer to:

- Lao Loum, an ethnic group of Laos
- A surname in West Africa among the Serer people
- LOUM (Laboratorio de Optica Murcia), a major optics research centre
- Loum, Cameroon
- Battle of Loum, a fictional space battle of the One Year War in the Mobile Suit Gundam series

== See also ==
- Loom, a device used for weaving
- Lum (disambiguation)
