= Habiba Alsafar =

Emirati geneticist

- حبيبة الصفار
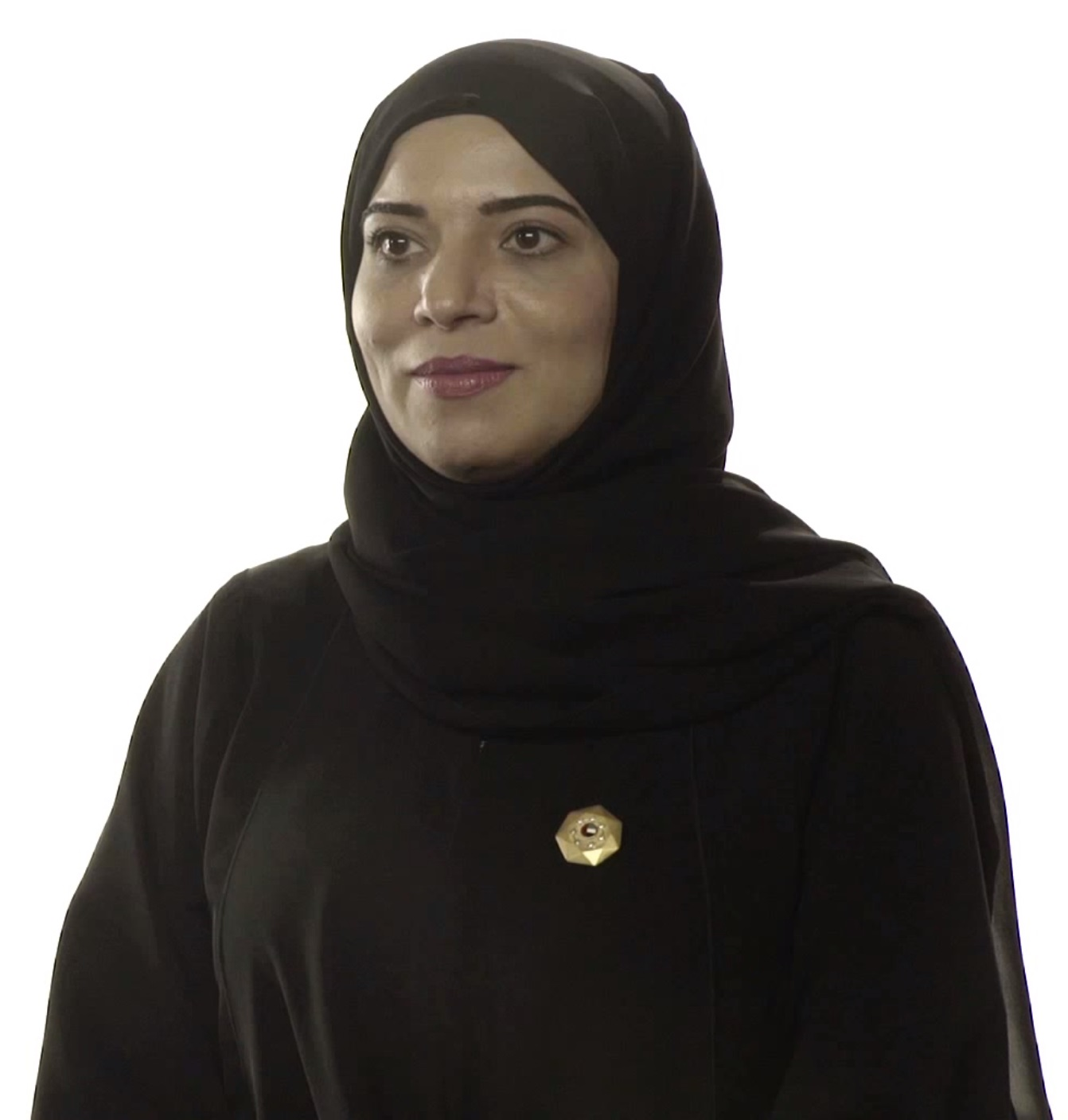
- Habiba Alsafar in a 2015 UAE promotional video
- Born: 1977 (age 48–49); United Arab Emirates
- Occupations: Geneticist, Academic
- Awards: International L'Oréal-UNESCO Fellowship for Women in Science

Academic background
- Education: University of Western Australia (PhD), University of Liverpool (MSc), San Diego State University (BSc)
- Thesis: The EFR project: a collaborative network to establish an Arabian bio-bank resource to identify disease genes of indigenous populations (2011)

Academic work
- Discipline: Genetics
- Website: Faculty page

Habiba Sayed Alsafar (Arabic: حبيبة سيد الصفار; born 1977) is an Emirati geneticist, biomedical engineer and academic. She is a Professor of Biomedical Engineering & Biotechnology at Khalifa University and is the Dean of College of Medicine and Health Sciences and Director of the Khalifa University Biotechnology Center.

She is widely recognized for her work on identifying genetic risk factors for diabetes in the native Bedouin population of the United Arab Emirates, and was ranked 52nd amongst the "100 Most Powerful Arab Women" of 2015 by Arabian Business. In 2016, she was awarded the International L'Oréal-UNESCO Fellowship for Women in Science.

== Education and training ==
Alsafar obtained a BSC in biochemistry at San Diego State University in 2002 and later a MSc in medical engineering at the University of Liverpool in 2003. She obtained her PhD in medical and forensic science from the University of Western Australia in 2010. She worked as a forensics expert for the Dubai Police for a number of years, and later joined Khalifa University as an assistant professor of biomedical engineering in 2011.

== Research ==
Alsafar's primary research interest concerns studying the genome of native Bedouin in the United Arab Emirates to identify specific genes that predispose to disease. As part of her PhD thesis, she established the Emirates Family Registry in 2007 which eventually stored DNA samples from over 26,000 volunteers, 1700 of whom were ethnic Bedouins. She conducted the first and largest Genome-wide association study of the Emirati Bedouin population which identified 5 genes unique to the Emirati population that was associated with type 2 diabetes mellitus, the strongest link being with the PRKD1 gene. Her findings were published in the International Journal of Diabetes and Metabolism in 2011. According to Alsafar, it was the first such study that studied the genetic makeup of an Arab population with regards to diabetes. The UAE is said to have the second highest rates of diabetes worldwide.

== Awards and recognition ==
She was awarded the UAE First Honor medal in 2014 for her work on creating a genetic map for the prevention and early detection of diabetes from Mohammed bin Rashid Al Maktoum, the ruler of Dubai. She also received the Emirates International Award of Genetic Diseases Prevention in the same year and received multiple grants from the Al Jalila Foundation. In 2015, she was nominated as a member of the World Economic Forum's Young Scientists Community and has also served on the World Economic Forum's Global Future Council on Biotechnologies (2016–2018). Since 2016, Alsafar was a member of the UAE Council of Scientists, and a member of Dubai's Future Council on Health & Wellbeing since 2019.

== Notable publications ==
- O'Day, Elizabeth; Alsafar, Habiba (14 September 2018). "Advanced Diagnostics for Personalized Medicine". Scientific American.
- Al Safar, Habiba S.; Cordell, Heather J.; Jafer, Osman; Anderson, Denise; Jamieson, Sarra E.; Fakiola, Michaela; Khazanehdari, Kamal; Tay, Guan K.; Blackwell, Jenefer M. (November 2013). "A Genome-Wide Search for Type 2 Diabetes Susceptibility Genes in an Extended Arab Family: GWAS for T2D in an Arab Family". Annals of Human Genetics. 77 (6): 488–503. doi:10.1111/ahg.12036. PMID 23937595. S2CID 206980373.
- Alsafar, Habiba; Jama-Alol, Khadra A.; Hassoun, Ahmed A. K.; Tay, Guan K. (March 2012). "The prevalence of Type 2 Diabetes Mellitus in the United Arab Emirates: justification for the establishment of the Emirates Family Registry". International Journal of Diabetes in Developing Countries. 32 (1): 25–32. doi:10.1007/s13410-012-0062-6. ISSN 0973-3930. S2CID 72369613.
- Al Safar, Habiba S.; Abidi, Fatima H.; Khazanehdari, Kamal A.; Dadour, Ian R.; Tay, Guan K. (February 2011). "Evaluation of different sources of DNA for use in genome wide studies and forensic application". Applied Microbiology and Biotechnology. 89 (3): 807–815. doi:10.1007/s00253-010-2926-3. ISSN 0175-7598. PMID 20978755. S2CID 9058169.
- Al Safar HS; Jamieson S; Cordell H; Blackwell J; Tay GK (2011). "Heritability of Quantitative Traits Associated with Type 2 Diabetes in an Extended Family from the United Arab Emirates". Int J Diabetes & Metab. 19: 56–62.
