= Allison Haywood =

New Zealand planktonologist

- Born: Allison Joy Haywood; 1966 or 1967 (age 59–60)
- Scientific career
- Thesis: Morphological and molecular systematics of unarmoured dinoflagellates (Gymnodiniales, Dinophyceae) from New Zealand (2002)

Allison Joy Haywood (born 1966 or 1967) is a planktonologist from New Zealand.

Haywood completed her doctorate degree at the University of Auckland, focusing on molecular systematics. Her thesis project aimed to rapidly identify toxic algae which can cause serious food poisoning. The title of her 2002 doctoral thesis was Morphological and molecular systematics of unarmoured dinoflagellates (Gymnodiniales, Dinophyceae) from New Zealand.

In 2001, while working at the Cawthron Institute in Nelson, New Zealand, Haywood successfully applied for a fellowship from the L'Oréal-UNESCO Awards for Women in Science. She was the first recipient of such an award or fellowship from the Southern Hemisphere. Haywood used the fellowship to visit the Monterey Bay Aquarium Research Institute in the United States. Her post-doctoral work was at the Florida Marine Institute.
