= Christine Ouinsavi =

Benin politician and forestry science researcher

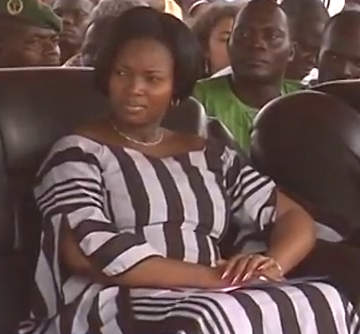
- Born: July 24, 1975 (age 50); Beterou, Benin
- Scientific career
- Fields: Biology

Christine Ouinsavi is a forestry biology researcher, recipient of the 2007 UNESCO-L’ORÉAL International fellowships for women in science, and politician from Benin. As of June 2017, she was the minister in charge of Primary Education, Literacy and National languages of Benin.

== Biography ==
Among fifteen young female researchers in the life sciences field, Christine Ouinsavi received the UNESCO-L’ORÉAL International fellowships award for women in science in 2007. She was among three women from Africa who receive the fellowship. Her interest was in forest biology and she was hosted by the Laval Forest Study Centre, Université Laval, Québec, Canada to "study the sustainable use of three forest plant species exploited as an important source of revenue by the rural population of Benin".

Christine Ouinsavi was a member of the government of Dr. Boni Yayi. She handled the portfolio of the ministry in charge of Primary Education, Literacy and National languages of Benin.

In 2017, she obtained a Ph.D. in agricultural sciences and was admitted to full professorship position at the University of Parakou, the first female to reach full professorship in that university. Before that, she was admitted to the University as an assistant professor in 2009 with a master of science in Agronomy engineering.
