= Priscilla Kolibea Mante =

Ghanaian neuropharmacologist

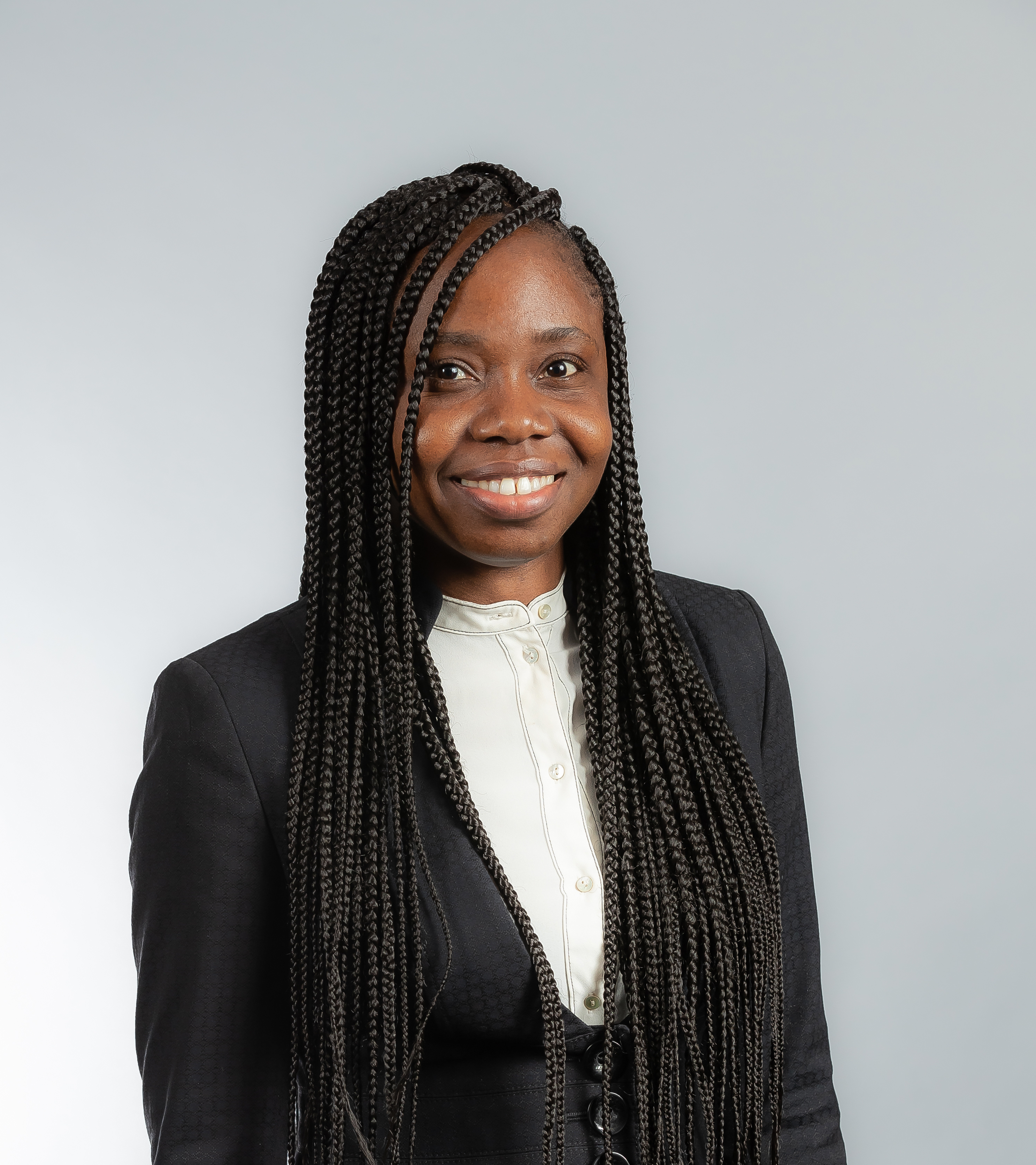
- Born: Ghana
- Education: Kwame Nkrumah University of Science and Technology; University of Michigan Medical School
- Scientific career
- Fields: Neuropharmacology, Neuroscience, Ethnopharmacology, Pharmacology
- Institutions: Kwame Nkrumah University of Science and Technology; Ghana Academy of Arts and Sciences

Priscilla Kolibea Mante is the first (currently only known) female Ghanaian neuropharmacologist, a researcher and Professor of Pharmacology at the Department of Pharmacology, Kwame Nkrumah University of Science and Technology,(KNUST) currently based at the Kumasi campus. Her research work focuses on alternatives of plant-based therapeutic options to manage drug-resistant epilepsy and the neglected tropical disease neurocysticercosis. In her works, she mostly explore the anticonvulsant activity of the plant alkaloid cryptolepine and its solid-lipid nanoparticles in the management of neurocysticercosis-induced epilepsy. Her goal is to identify a way to help cryptolepine permeate more efficiently into the central nervous system to reduce the risk of convulsion, helping patients to manage their condition as effectively as possible. Aside from her studies of epilepsy, Mante has also worked toward new therapies to alleviate pain, anxiety, and depression.

In 2019, she was the only African recipient, and one of fifteen total, of the L'Oréal-UNESCO For Women in Science International Rising Talent Award. She is also a recipient of the 2018 L'Oréal-UNESCO For Women in Science Sub-Saharan Africa post-doctoral fellowship. She won the 2019 OWSD Early Career Fellowship.

== Education ==
Mante completed her secondary school education at the Wesley Girls’ Senior High School, Cape Coast, Ghana. She earned a PhD in Pharmacology from the Kwame Nkrumah University of Science and Technology in 2013. Mante's doctorate research focused on the use of Antiaris toxicaria as an anticonvulsant, specifically in Ghana. During the same period she also researched plant-based therapies for the central nervous system. Mante had her post doctoral training at the University of Michigan Medical School in USA, where she was a recipient of the University of Michigan STEM Seed Grant.

== Career ==
Mante is a registered pharmacist with the Pharmacy Council of Ghana and a member of the Pharmaceutical Society of Ghana. She has been a registered pharmacist since 2010. Since 2013, Mante has worked at the Pharmacology Department of KNUST, where she is an associate professor. She is a former chair of the Ghana Young Academy (2019 - 2022). In 2022, she was elected as co-chair of the Global Young Academy. Re-elected for a second term in 2023. She is the chairperson for the Academic, Social and Research Pharmacists Association of Ghana (Elected in 2023, re-elected in 2025) and a member of the governing board of the Pharmaceutical Society of Ghana (2023-2025); Re-elected for a second term (2025-2027). Mante is internationally recognized for her leadership in science diplomacy and research policy. As Co-Chair of the Global Young Academy (2022–2024), she advanced frameworks to increase early-career scientist participation in international decision-making. She is a member of the UNESCO Global Advisory Committee for Women in Science. Mante is also a member of the steering committee for the World Science Forum 2024. She has contributed to global science-policy dialogues through her work with international organizations such as the United Nations Economic Commission for Africa (UNECA), and the InterAcademy Partnership (IAP) and the International Science Council (ISC). Mante is widely known for her passion for education and leading women in science to further their careers.

"The world will make room for us. The more women push for senior roles, the harder it will be to ignore them."—Dr. Mante, regarding the increasing presence of women in science
