= Mounira Hmani Aifa =

Tunisian geneticist

- Born: 1972 (age 52–53); Sfax
- Citizenship: Tunisia
- Occupation: geneticist

Mounira Hmani Aifa (born 1972) is a Tunisian geneticist, best known for her work in mapping the PRSS56 gene. She has been a recipient of the "Sur les traces de Marie Curie" award from UNESCO and the L'Oreal Foundation in 2012, and a fellowship from them in 2002.

Aifa is from Sfax, in Tunisia, and currently teaches and researches at the Sfax Biotechnology Center. In 2002, she won a fellowship from L'Oréal-UNESCO For Women in Science, which allowed her to pursue post-graduate research in human genetics at the Faculty of Medical Sciences in Linköping, Sweden. She continued this research in Tunisia, working on a project which studied the genetic origins of hereditary deafness. She also pursued research on posterior microphthalmia, a rare genetic condition affecting the eye, for which she mapped the PRSS56 gene, and established its potential links with a type of glaucoma. In 2012, she was awarded the "Sur les traces de Marie Curie" from UNESCO and the L'Oreal Foundation for this research.
