= Rahanna Juman =

Rahanna Alicia Juman PhD
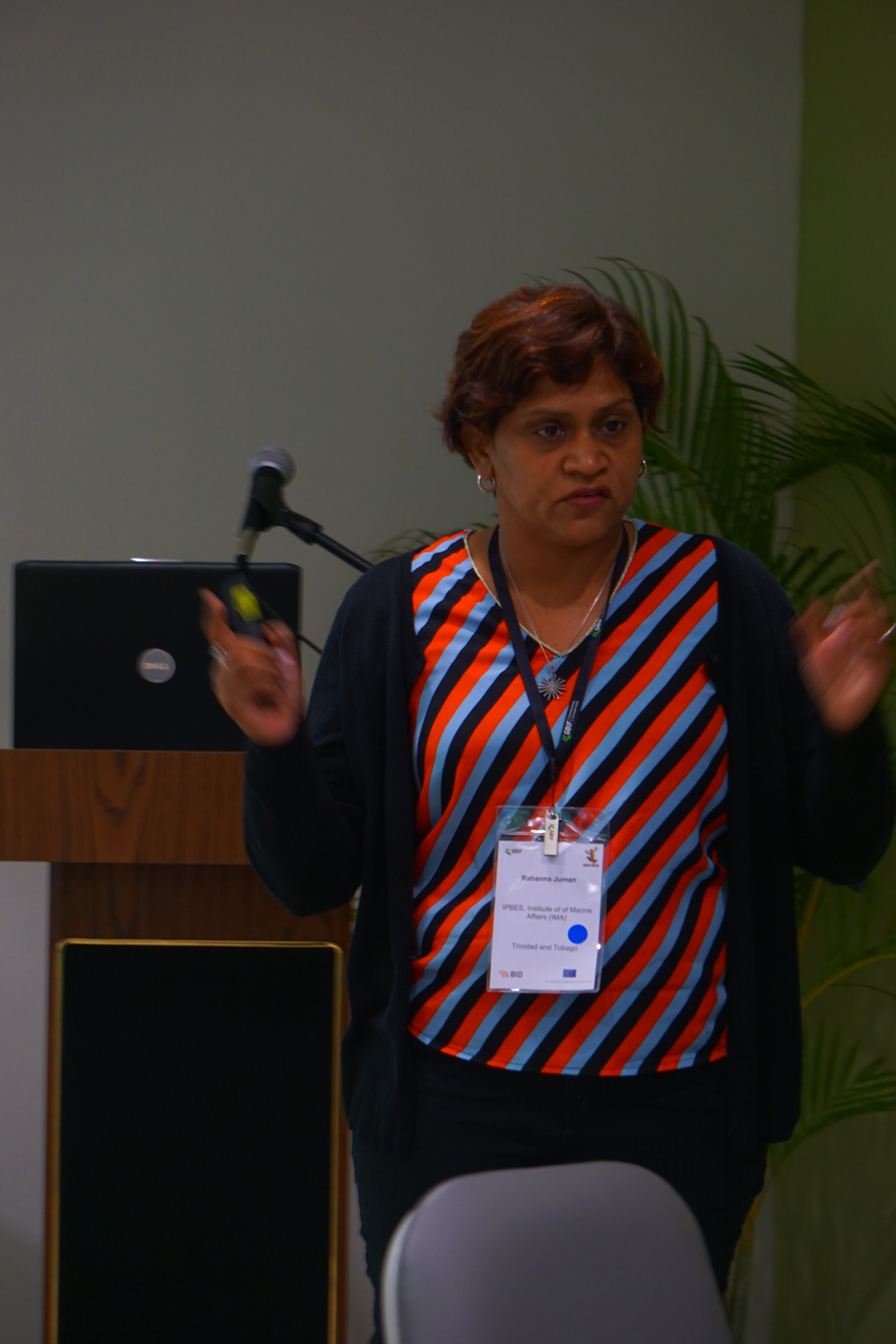

Academic background
- Education: University of the West Indies (PhD); University of Washington (post-doc fellowship)
- Thesis: Characterisation and Ecology of the Bon Accord Lagoon, Tobago, West Indies (2008)

Dr. Rahanna Alicia Juman is an ecologist and author whose scientific career has been focused on the ecology of the wetlands of Trinidad and Tobago.

== Early life ==
Dr. Juman was born on February 14, 1973 and is a citizen of Trinidad and Tobago.

Environmental science wasn’t Dr. Juman’s first career choice. In an interview with The Guardian from 2025 she said, “Growing up, I wanted to be a doctor, but I couldn’t afford it back then . . . I went to university and did the next best thing, which is science. After graduating from UWI [The University of the West Indies], I was able to get a four-month internship at the IMA [Institute of Marine Affairs], and I’m there 29 years after.”

Dr. Juman began her career at the Research Department of the Institute of Marine Affairs in 1996, immediately after leaving the university, as an intern with a four-month contract.

== Education and awards ==
In 1996 Dr. Juman received a BSc in zoology/botany from The University of the West Indies. In 2004 she received a PhD in zoology from the University of the West Indies. Her doctoral dissertation was on “Characterisation and Ecology of the Bon Accord Lagoon, Tobago, West Indies.” In 2015 Dr. Juman received a Bachelor of Law from the University of London. In 2002, Juman was awarded a $10,000 prize from the L'Oréal-UNESCO For Women in Science Awards. Currently only 33% of researchers throughout the world are women. L’Oreal and UNESCO established this award in 2000 to recognize the achievement of “younger women who are in the early stages of their scientific careers” and encourage greater equity in scientific fields.

She has been awarded several post-doctoral fellowships. In 2006 she was an American Fellow at the U.S. Environmental Protection Agency. In 2008 Dr. Juman was named a Watson International Scholars of the Environment Fellow at Brown University. This program offers recipients a one-year $40,000 grant for independent research outside of the U.S. Her research focused on land use changes in developing countries. In 2010-2011 she was awarded a Hubert Humphrey fellowship at the University of Washington's Evans School of Public Policy. This program was created to encourage leadership among international professionals who are collaborating on local and global challenges and to help bring about change for the common good. Its goals include ensuring sustainable environments. Dr. Juman has also done an internship in the United States at the National Oceanic and Atmospheric Administration in 2011.

== Career ==
Dr. Juman has worked at the Institute of Marine Affairs since 1996. She was appointed the Deputy Director, Research in December 2015. Dr. Juman has been conducting applied research on coastal ecosystems in Trinidad and Tobago and the Caribbean region for the past 20 years. She focuses particularly on seagrass beds and mangrove forests.

In addition to her scientific studies at the IMA she serves on two significant committees appointed by Trinidad and Tobago’s cabinet. She is the deputy chair of the Integrated Coastal Zone Management (ICZM) Inter-Ministerial Committee and the chair of the National Sargassum Task Force. She is also leading her country’s efforts to create a Marine Spatial Plan for the Gulf of Paria, the shallow semi-enclosed sea area that lies between the coast of Venezuela and the island of Trinidad. Trinidad and Tobago has jurisdiction over 37.7 percent of this area. According to UNESCO, Marine Spatial Planning is “a public process of analyzing and allocating the spatial and temporal distribution of human activities in marine areas to achieve ecological, economic and social objectives that have been specified through a political process.”

Dr. Juman chaired the Caribbean Sea Commission from 2021-2023 and is a member of the Joint Group of Experts on the Scientific Aspects of Marine Environmental Protection (GESAMP) Working Group 41 on Ocean Interventions for Climate Change Mitigation.

She was also recently elected Vice Chair of the International Oceanographic Commission (IOC) IOCARRIBE Board in 2025. The IOC is a committee of UNESCO, the United Nations Educational, Scientific and Cultural Organization.

Much of Dr. Juman’s environmental work has been focused on the vital role of the mangrove swamps in the ecosystem of Trinidad and Tobago. She reports that “In Tobago, the largest mangrove communities are found at the southwest end of the island which is the most populated and developed part of the island. Southwest Tobago has experienced rapid growth and development in the tourism and related service sectors. Mangroves were cleared in the 1990′s [sic] for the extension of the Crown Point Airport and for hotel development. In 2007, mangroves were cleared in the Bon Accord Lagoon for proposed resort development and in 2008 for housing.”

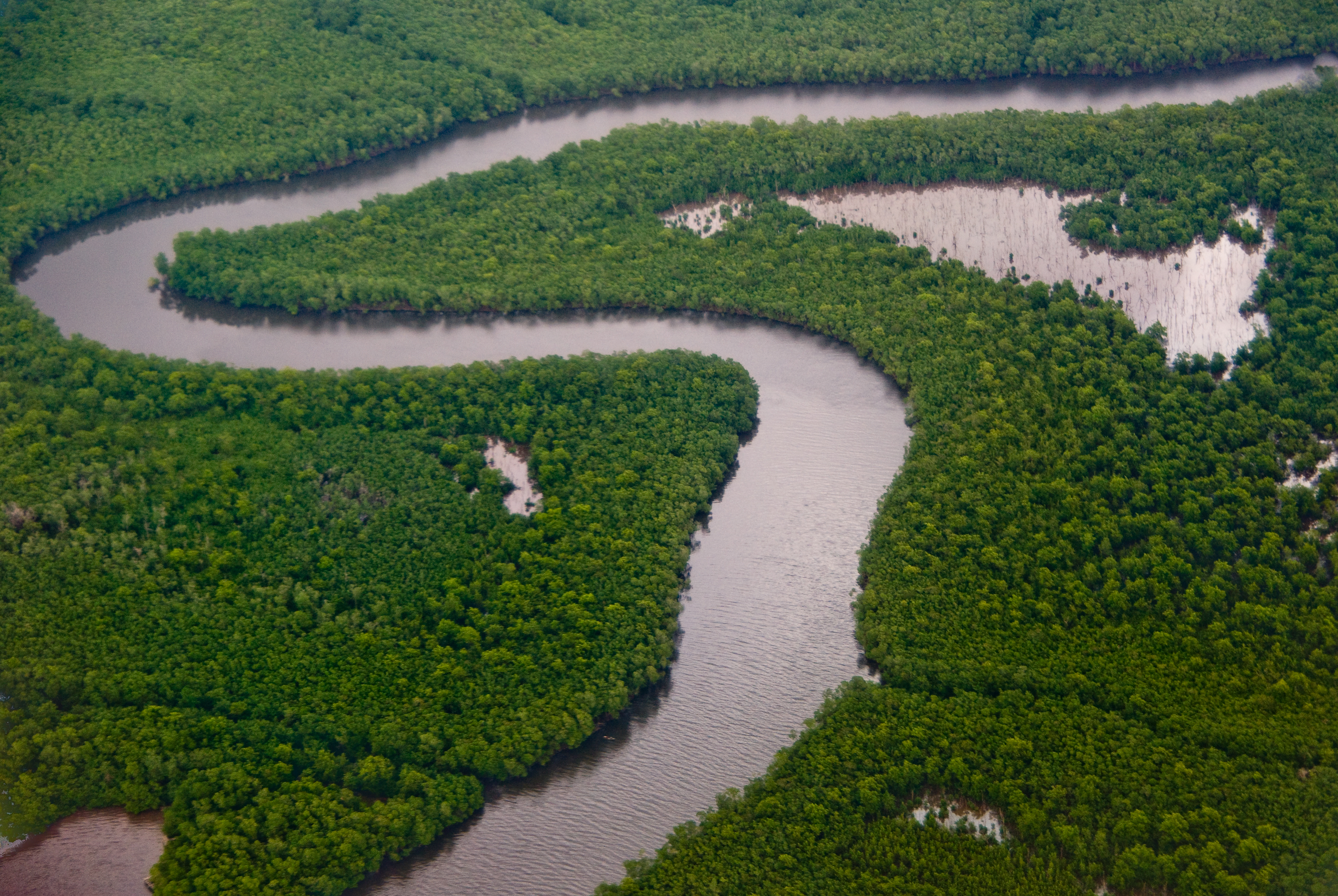
Caroni Swamp, Trinidad & Tobago's largest mangrove wetland. This is an example of the type of ecosystem Dr. Juman has dedicated her career to preserving.

She adds that human activities continue to threaten the mangroves, since much of the current and future development is happening on the coast, which is where the concentration of mangroves exists. When the development is allowed to occur close to the mangrove forests, it increases the likelihood that the trees will be negatively affected by pollution. It also leaves little area for the mangrove forests to move inland as the climate change causes the sea level to rise.

She stresses the importance of assessing each proposed site before any development occurs. These site-specific vulnerability assessments can then be used to reduce the social disruption and economic costs of a project, and to minimize the loss of important coastal habitats. She recommends developing a coastal zone management plan that could include setbacks or buffer zones between mangroves and new building projects.

Dr. Juman has been very involved in the Blue Carbon Credit Scheme for Trinidad and Tobago. She is working on mapping how much carbon is stored in the mangrove forests to get a better idea of their ecosystem’s role within climate change.

Blue carbon refers to how much organic carbon is stored within coastal and marine ecosystems. This process of storing carbon in these natural areas is known as carbon sequestration, which is considered crucial in the global effort to reduce the total carbon in the atmosphere. Climate scientists assert that it is important to preserve natural areas that sequester large amounts of carbon because if these areas are developed or degraded, the carbon stored within them will be released into the atmosphere, further exacerbating this critical problem. Although the role of the mangrove forests is somewhat unique to Trinidad and Tobago, environmentalists believe that studying how this ecosystem sequesters carbon could prove useful in studying other similar ecosystems throughout the world.

Dr. Juman notes that to participate in any international carbon schemes a country needs rigid data. The first step is for scientists to determine how much carbon is currently stored in the soil and the biomass of Trinidad and Tobago’s mangrove forests. They can then assess the condition of the mangrove ecosystem to see how deteriorated it is and calculate how much additional carbon could be sequestered if the ecosystem were restored to a healthier state. This information will enable them to apply for funding that can be used for rehabilitation of the ecosystem. In addition to increasing carbon sequestration and helping reduce climate change, rehabilitation of the mangrove forests can protect against coastal erosion and improve the habitat for the plants and animals residents eat.

In a TedTalk from 2017, Dr. Juman explains the significance of Trinidad and Tobago’s mangrove forests in carbon sequestration, but also emphasized the importance of their ability to protect against natural disasters. “Mangroves break up storms by dissipating wind and wave energy and it protects against coastal erosion.” She added that “according to an Inter-American Development Bank study between 2005 and 2015, the number of climate-related natural disasters that occurred in Trinidad & Tobago increased by five fold. We had five times more disasters in ten years.”

== Selected publications ==
- Juman, Rahanna A. Wetlands of Trinidad & Tobago, 2010, Prospect Press, ISBN 9789769508262
- Juman, Rahanna A. The structure and productivity of the Thalassia testudinum community in Bon Accord Lagoon, Tobago. Revista de Biología Tropical 53 (2005): 219–227.
