= Reema Fayez Tayyem =

Professor of Nutrition and Food

Reema Fayez Tayyem (Arabic: ريما فايز تيم, romanized: Rīmā Fāyiz Tayyim) is a Professor of Nutrition and Food Technology Department at the University of Jordan since 2016. Professor Tayyem earned a BSc in biochemistry and MSc and PhD in Human Nutrition. She was a professor of Nutrition and Food Production in the Department of Clinical Nutrition and Dietetics at Hashemite University’s Faculty of Applied Health Sciences since 2001. In 2021, she joined the Department of Human Nutrition at Qatar University. In 2005, Prof. Tayyem received the UNESCO-L'Oreal Fellowship for Young Women in Life Sciences and conducted postdoctoral research at UCSD Cancer Center at the University of California, San Diego, in the United States. Her research interests include determining the degree of malnutrition among end stage renal disease patients, developing dietary questionnaires and Nutrition and Cancer. She is also the Editor-in-Chief of the Pakistan Journal of Nutrition. She has presented at numerous international, regional, and national conferences and workshops and is a member of the WHO/NUGAG Subgroup on the Policy Actions Committee. Prof. Tayyem has served or is currently serving on the editorial boards of several journals and has authored over 200 papers in peer-reviewed journals. She played a significant role in establishing the Jordanian Dietary guidelines for healthy individuals and patients with chronic diseases related to diet. Additionally, she has received several awards and honors for her work.
