= Sarrah Ben M'barek =

Dutch-Tunisian phytopathologist and botanist

- Born: 1979 (age 46–47)
- Other name: Sarrah Ben M'barek-Ben Romdhane
- Scientific career
- Thesis: Genome structure and pathogenicity of the fungal wheat pathogen Mycosphaerella graminicola (2011)
- Doctoral advisor: Gert Kema

Sarrah Ben M'barek-Ben Romdhane is a Tunisian-Dutch crop researcher. She works on developing fungus-resistant wheat strains to reduce the toll of Mycosphaerella graminicola on yields.

== Early life and education ==
Ben M'barek was born in Tunisia in 1979. However, she would regularly visit her mother's family in the Netherlands near tree nurseries in Boskoop. Seeing these cultivation centres and wheat plantations in Beja, Tunisia fuelled her interest in plant biology.

Ben M'barek received her bachelor's degree in Tunis, then moved to the Netherlands for graduate studies. She completed her master's and doctorate in plant biotechnology at Wageningen University where she was supervised by Gert Kema.

Ben M'barek's main research focus was the fungus Mycosphaerella graminicola that affects wheat crops. Her master's thesis was titled Aspects of fungicide resistance & genetics and detection fo [sic] Mycosphaerella graminicola, wheat Septoria tritici leaf blotch pathogen (2004). After completing her master's, Ben M'barek returned to Tunis to lecture and intermittently returned to Plant Research International in Wageningen to pursue her research. When she was awarded a L'Oréal-UNESCO For Women in Science Fellowship in 2007, she was able to return to the Netherlands full-time to focus on her PhD. She finished her doctorate in 2011 with a thesis entitled Genome structure and pathogenicity of the fungal wheat pathogen Mycosphaerella graminicola.

== Career ==
Ben M'Barek became a researcher in the Laboratory of Molecular Plant Physiology of the Biotechnology Center of Borj Cédria, Tunisia after completing her PhD. In 2015, she joined the Wheat-CRP Tunisia-Septoria Precision Phenotyping Platform of the CIMMYT. In 2017, she started working at Beja Regional Field Crop Research. She is a manager for the Septoria Platform Laboratory, where she also supervises graduate students. She is a fellow of the Arab Women Leaders in Agriculture.

Mycosphaerella graminicola is a disease that affects wheat crops around the world, leading to losses as large as 50% at harvest. In Europe, up to $600 million is spent on fungicides every year to combat it. Ben M'barek's strategy is to map out the Mycosphaerella genome in order to better understand how it attacks wheat and what could be done to develop Mycosphaerella-resistant wheat strains. She has found that the fungus attacks wheat in multiple ways, and is very resistant to damage including loss of chromosomes. This flexibility makes it particularly difficult to develop resistance in wheat. However, her findings shed light on the mechanisms used by the fungus and show which potential hybrids may be less sensitive to it.

== Awards and honours ==
- 2019 Junior Award for excellence in Science and Technology of ATUGE.
- 2017 Women in Triticum Early Career Award.
- 2007 Fellowship from L'Oréal-UNESCO For Women in Science.
- Ritzema-Bos Award for Excellence of the Royal Netherlands Society for Plant Pathology.
- Fellow of the Arab Women Leaders in Agriculture.

== Personal life ==
Ben M'barek is fluent in four languages and hopes to use her connections to foster collaboration between Tunisia and the Netherlands.

She has stated that being a mother and scientist "in a post-revolution country who recently embraced democracy" has its challenges, but she is passionate about leading the scientific development of her country and helping to eradicate hunger.
