= Elena J. Tucker =

Australian geneticist

Elena Jane Tucker
- Education: University of Melbourne (B.S.), Murdoch Children's Research Institute (Ph.D.)
- Occupation: Geneticist
- Known for: Investigations of mitochondrial disease
- Awards: International Rising Talents, L'Oréal-UNESCO For Women in Science Awards

Elena Jane Tucker is an Australian geneticist and medical genomics researcher and a 2016 Rising Talent in the L'Oréal-UNESCO For Women in Science Awards.

== Biography ==
Tucker earned her B.S. at University of Melbourne in 2006. She earned her Ph.D. in medical genomics at the same university's Murdoch Children's Research Institute in 2011 focusing on using new approaches to genomics to improve the diagnosis and management of patients with mitochondrial disease. She continues to work there as a research fellow, investigating the molecular basis of disorders of sex development.

Most recently, her position has been Honorary Fellow, Department of Paediatrics, University of Melbourne and she works in the Reproductive Development group, focusing on the genetics of ovarian dysfunction, in particular premature ovarian insufficiency.

Tucker investigates mitochondrial disease, which often results from mutations in genes and there are more than 100 different genes in which mutations can cause the disease. Earlier research could only look for gene mutations in one gene at a time to determine if it caused disease. Tucker's research has introduced new technology that can evaluate hundreds or thousands of genes at once, looking for new links between genes and disease allowing diagnosticians to deliver treatment to patients faster. She believes the same techniques can be adapted to provide diagnosis of other genetic conditions such as epilepsy and heart disease.

== Selected awards ==
- 2011, Kirby Travel Award, Human Genetic Society of Australasia
- 2012, Victorian Young Tall Poppy Science Award, Australian Institute of Policy and Science
- 2016, International Rising Talents, L'Oréal-UNESCO For Women in Science Awards
- 2021, Society for the Study of Reproduction (SSR): Rising Star Nomination

== Selected publications ==
- Tucker, E. J., Hershman, S. G., Köhrer, C., Belcher-Timme, C. A., Patel, J., Goldberger, O. A., ... & Mootha, V. K. (2011). Mutations in MTFMT underlie a human disorder of formylation causing impaired mitochondrial translation. Cell metabolism, 14(3), 428-434.
- Tucker, E. J., Wanschers, B. F., Szklarczyk, R., Mountford, H. S., Wijeyeratne, X. W., van den Brand, M. A., ... & Thorburn, D. R. (2013). Mutations in the UQCC1-interacting protein, UQCC2, cause human complex III deficiency associated with perturbed cytochrome b protein expression. PLoS genetics, 9(12), e1004034.
- Tucker, E. J., Grover, S. R., Bachelot, A., Touraine, P., & Sinclair, A. H. (2016). Premature ovarian insufficiency: new perspectives on genetic cause and phenotypic spectrum. Endocrine reviews, 37(6), 609-635.
- Tucker, E. J., Jaillard, S., Grover, S. R., van den Bergen, J., Robevska, G., Bell, K. M., ... & Sinclair, A. H. (2019). TP63‐truncating variants cause isolated premature ovarian insufficiency. Human Mutation, 40(7), 886-892.
- Tucker, E. J., Bell, K. M., Robevska, G., van den Bergen, J., Ayers, K. L., Listyasari, N., ... & Sinclair, A. H. (2022). Meiotic genes in premature ovarian insufficiency: variants in HROB and REC8 as likely genetic causes. European Journal of Human Genetics, 30(2), 219-228.
