= Alia Shatanawi =

Jordanian academic

Alia Shatanawi is head of the Department of Pharmacology, Faculty of Medicine, University of Jordan. In 2014 she was awarded a fellowship with L'Oréal-UNESCO For Women in Science following her work on how cardiovascular complications occur in people with diabetes.
