= Patricia Miang Lon Ng =

Singaporean scientist

Patricia Mian Lon Ng is a Singaporean scientist. She is a researcher at the Singapore Immunology Network.

== Biography ==
Ng holds a Ph.D. degree in cell and molecular biology. She is a research fellow at the Singapore Immunology Network, part of the Agency for Science, Technology and Research in Singapore.

Ng's research focuses on re-engineering antibodies so that they become more effective in fighting disease. In 2012 she received a L'Oréal-UNESCO For Women in Science Award. She was also nominated for a Great Women of Our Time Award, an annual suite of awards by The Singapore Women's Weekly magazine.
