= Anaïs Orsi =

Climate scientist

Anaïs Orsi is a climate scientist studying global warming through changes in polar ice.

== Background ==
Orsi received a Master's Degree in Engineering from the École Polytechnique in 2007. She then obtained a Master's Degree in Oceanography from the University of California, San Diego, and her PhD from the Scripps Institution of Oceanography. She travels to Antarctica to study internal weather patterns and uses them to predict future climate change.

== Awards ==
- 2016 — L'Oréal-UNESCO For Women in Science Awards Rising Talent
