= Jacqueline Chaparro Olaya =

Colombian biologist and parasitologist

Jacqueline Chaparro Olaya is a Colombian biologist and parasitologist, recipient of the L’Oréal-UNESCO for Women in Science grant in 2001 for her research on the application of molecular techniques in the field of infectious diseases.

== Education ==
Chaparro Olaya completed all of her professional development education at the Universidad Nacional de Colombia Sede Bogotá (The National University of Colombia at Bogota). She achieved the title of biologist in 1992. Between 1994 and 1997 she completed her master's degree in science with a focus on biochemistry, and between 2000 and 2006 she completed a doctorate in the sciences with a focus on chemistry. She fulfilled other complementary studies in other institutions such as The United Nations University, The International Atomic Energy Agency, Tulane University, and King’s College of London.

== Career ==
Chaparro began research at the National Institute of Health in 1993 and was supported by the institution until 2004. During her time there, she worked as a coordinator of the biologist research group. She also has research ties to El Bosque University, where she acted as the director of The Molecular Parasitology Lab as well director of the Molecular Biology Institute. Throughout her career she has worked to study the application of molecular techniques through the integration of various fields of biological research pertaining to the study of infectious diseases, molecular motors in the Apicoplexa phylum of parasitic alveolates and the cellular and molecular biology of the protozoan parasite Giardia lamblia.

Through her notable work in research, Chaparro has received numerous awards and recognitions in regard to her notable achievements, some of the most prominent achievements including receiving a grant from the L'Oréal-UNESCO Awards for Women in Science program in 2001, a research grant awarded by the Wellcome Trust in 2002, a National Award in the field of General Medical Sciences in 2005 as well as another National Award in 2008 accredited to the best research work done in General Sciences, amongst others. She has published around twenty articles in scientific magazines specifically in her home country as well as internationally, and has collaborated on a chapter of the book, Las miosinas de Plasmodium falciparum, or The myosins of Plasmodium Falciparum.
