= Ran Long =

Chinese chemist

- Education: University of Science and Technology of China
- Known for: Research in synchrotron radiation spectroscopy and plasmonic effects
- Awards: L'Oréal-UNESCO Award for Women in Science International Rising Talents Award in 2017
- Scientific career
- Fields: Chemistry, Inorganic chemistry, Nanochemistry
- Workplaces: University of Science and Technology of China

Ran Long (simplified Chinese: 龙冉) is a Chinese scientist. She is a professor and doctoral supervisor at the University of Science and Technology of China (USTC).

== Education ==
Long received her bachelor's degree in chemistry in 2009 and a Doctor of Philosophy in inorganic chemistry in 2014 under the supervision of Professor Yujie Xiong both from USTC.

== Career ==
She joined the National Synchrotron Radiation Laboratory (NSRL) at USTC as a postdoctoral researcher since 2014, working with Professor Li Song. From 2016 to 2021, she held positions as an associate professor at NSRL. Since 2021, she has been a professor at the School of Nuclear Science and Technology and NSRL at USTC.

== Research ==
Long and her team of researchers at USTC focuses on synchrotron radiation spectroscopy and plasmonic effects, and their applications in energy-related small molecule conversion.

Long has published 188 SCI papers in international journals, with over 11,000 citations. She has authored more than 50 papers as the first or corresponding author in high-impact journals such as Nature Science Review, Journal of the American Chemical Society, Angewandte Chemie International Edition, Advanced Materials, Nature Communications, and Chemical Society Reviews.

== Awards and honors ==
Long won the L'Oréal-UNESCO Awards for Women in Science International Rising Talents Award in 2017 for unlocking the potential of energy resources with nanochemistry. In 2018, she became a laureate of the Asian Scientist 100 by the Asian Scientist.
