= Stephanie Jenouvrier =

French population ecologist

- Education: University of Pierre et Marie Curie (Graduate), Paris-Sud University (Undergraduate)
- Scientific career
- Fields: Seabird Population Ecologist
- Workplaces: Woods Hole Oceanographic Institution, Center for Biological Studies of Chizé

Stéphanie Jenouvrier is a French population ecologist with a research interest in Antarctic seabirds as indicators of climate change. She is currently a senior scientist leading the Forecasting the Long term Ecological and Demographic impacts of Global Environmental changes (FLEDGE) lab at the Woods Hole Oceanographic Institution (WHOI). She is most known for her work with emperor penguin population forecasting models, where she reported massive declines for the species by the end of the century based on several factors including sea-ice loss.

== Education ==
Jenouvrier obtained her Bachelor of Science degree in Biology and Ecology from the University of Paris-Sud in 1999. During her time there, Jenouvrier studied brown bears in Pyrénées National Park, France, where she worked on a statistical monitoring and tracking program for the population. In 2001, Jenouvrier obtained a master's degree in ecology from the University of Pierre et Marie Curie in Paris, where she studied the performance of a statistical model in biodiveristy dynamics, as well as golden eagle conservation in Mercantour National Park. Her education terminated in 2004 with a PhD in Population Ecology from the same university. Jenouvrier's dissertation was on southern fulmar population dynamics, published in the British Ecological Society's Journal of Animal Ecology. Jenouvrier then went on to complete a postdoctoral project at the Center for Biological Studies of Chizé

== Career and impact ==
Jenouvrier's research uses models to understand and predict seabird population dynamics amidst a changing climate, as seabirds are known to be good indicator species of climate change. In 2009, Jenouvrier linked climate models with models of penguin biology to determine the response of penguins to a changing climate. Her subsequent work revealed that Emperor penguins will be quasi-extinct by the year 2100 if warming as a result of carbon emissions continues on its current predicted path. This is due to loss in sea ice, which is important for emperor penguin breeding, molting, and feeding practices. Jenouvrier's study on emperor penguins has been highlighted in several articles and a short film. It was one of the driving forces in updating the species' to "threatened status" under the Endangered Species Act in 2022.

Jenouvrier is also a part of Project SENSEI (Sentinels of the Sea Ice), a French effort to understand and educate about the impacts of changing sea ice through indicator species. Through this program Jenouvrier has produced scientific work on southern fulmars in the Southern Hemisphere and has contributed to the goal of outreach through video lectures and other educational material.

== Awards and honors ==
In 2006, Jenouvrier received a L'Oréal-UNESCO For Women in Science Award.

== Selected works ==
- Jenouvrier S, Eparvier A., Sen B., Ventura F., Che-Castaldo C., Holland M., Garnier J., Barbraud C., Delord K., Trathan T. 2025. Living with Uncertainty: Using Multi-Model Large Ensembles to Assess Emperor Penguin Extinction Risk for the IUCN Red List. Biological Conservation, 11037. DOI: 10.1016/j.biocon.2025.111037.
- Jenouvrier S., Aubry L., Barbraud C., Weimerskirch H. and Caswell H. 2018a. Interacting effects of unobserved heterogeneity and individual stochasticity in the life history of the Southern fulmar. Journal of Animal Ecology, 87(1): 212–222.
- Jenouvrier S., Peron C. and Weimerskirch H. 2015. Extreme climate events and individual heterogeneity shape life history traits and population dynamics. Ecological Monographs, 85: 605-624.
- Jenouvrier S., Weimerskirch H., Barbraud C., Park Y-H. and Cazelles B. 2005. Evidence of a shift in cyclicity of Antarctic seabird dynamics link to climate. Proceedings of the Royal Society, 272: 887–895.
