= Olena Vaneeva =

Ukrainian mathematician

Olena Oleksandrivna Vaneeva
- Born: 28 June 1982 (age 44); Dnipro, Ukraine
- Education: Dnipro National University
- Occupation: Mathematics researcher
- Children: Three

Olena Oleksandrivna Vaneeva (Ukrainian: Олена Олександрівна Ванєєва; born 28 June 1982, Dnipro) is a Ukrainian mathematician, corresponding member of the National Academy of Sciences of Ukraine (since 2024) and leading researcher at the Department of Mathematical Physics of the Institute of Mathematics, National Academy of Sciences of Ukraine. Her major research interest is the group analysis of partial differential equations.

== Life and work ==
Vaneeva graduated with a silver medal from Dnipropetrovsk Secondary School in 1999 and enrolled at the Faculty of Mechanics and Mathematics of the Dnipro National University, graduating in 2004. She earned her PhD in Mathematical Physics (2008) with her dissertation titled Group classification and nonclassical symmetries of reaction-diffusion equations under the direction of R.O. Popovych. She finished her post-doctoral habilitation, also with Popovych, in 2020.

Vaneeva has also collaborated with researchers at the University of Cyprus in Nicosia, in the department of mathematics and statistics working on group analysis of differential equations.

Since 2007, she has been working in Kyiv at the Ukrainian Institute of Mathematics and in 2021 became a leading researcher. In 2021-2024 she was a vice head of the same institute.

She is the managing editor of the Ukrainian Mathematical Journal.

== Awards ==
- 2010 – Prize of the President of Ukraine for young scientists for a series of articles "Algebraic methods in mathematical physics."
- 2014 – Abel Visiting Scholar Grant from the Niels Henrik Abel Board.
- 2018 – Ukrainian award L'ORÉAL-UNESCO "For Women in Science."
- 2020 – International Rising Talents – awarded to young researchers as part of the L'ORÉAL-UNESCO Award for Women in Science.
- 2020 – winner of the National Award "Woman of Ukraine" 2020 in the category "Science".

== Selected publications ==
- Vaneeva, Olena O., A. G. Johnpillai, R. O. Popovych, and Christodoulos Sophocleous. "Enhanced group analysis and conservation laws of variable coefficient reaction–diffusion equations with power nonlinearities." Journal of Mathematical Analysis and Applications 330, no. 2 (2007): 1363-1386.
- Vaneeva, Olena O., Roman O. Popovych, and Christodoulos Sophocleous. "Enhanced group analysis and exact solutions of variable coefficient semilinear diffusion equations with a power source." Acta applicandae mathematicae 106, no. 1 (2009): 1-46.
- Vaneeva, Olena O., R. O. Popovych, and Christodoulos Sophocleous. "Extended group analysis of variable coefficient reaction–diffusion equations with exponential nonlinearities." Journal of Mathematical Analysis and Applications 396, no. 1 (2012): 225-242.
- Vaneeva, Olena O., Alexander Bihlo, and Roman O. Popovych. "Generalization of the algebraic method of group classification with application to nonlinear wave and elliptic equations." Communications in Nonlinear Science and Numerical Simulation 91 (2020): 105419.
