= Giomar Helena Borrero-Pérez =

Colombian marine biologist

- Born: Mitú
- Education: Jorge Tadeo Lozano University; University of Murcia
- Awards: L'Oréal-UNESCO For Women in Science Award

Giomar Helena Borrero-Pérez is a Colombian marine biologist. In 2012 she became the sixth Colombian scientist to be awarded a L'Oréal-UNESCO For Women in Science Award. Her work considers the conservation of sea cucumbers.

== Early life and education ==
Borrero was born in Mitú. She attended the National Indigenous Normal School of Mitú until 1992. Borrero was awarded a scholarship from Ecopetrol to attend Jorge Tadeo Lozano University, where she studied marine biology. She moved to Spain for her doctoral studies, where she worked on biodiversity at the University of Murcia. Whilst in Spain she started to work on the Holothuroidea species.

== Research and career ==
Borrero completed an internship at the José Benito Vives de Andréis Marine and Coastal Research Institute. She served as a curator at the Museum of Marine History in Colombia. Her research considers sea cucumbers from around the Colombian - Caribbean coast. In 2014 she joined the Smithsonian Tropical Research Institute where she worked as a postdoctoral researcher studying the connectivity of Isostichopus badionotus populations.

=== Awards and honours ===
- 2003 - Young Researchers Award, Colciencias
- 2004 - European Commission AlBan Scholarship
- 2012 - L'Oréal-UNESCO For Women in Science Award
