= Saba Al Heialy =

Scientific researcher

Saba Al Heialy is a Middle Eastern scientific researcher. She was awarded L'Oréal-Unesco For Women In Science Award, honored for 'International Rising Talent' and 'Outstanding Female Scientist'.

== Education ==
Al Heialy attended university at the Université du Québec à Montréal (2007) where she received her Bachelor of Science in biochemistry. She then attended McGill University (2013) where she received her Doctor of Philosophy in Experimental Medicine. At McGill University she conducted her research under her mentor Dr. James Martin in the Meakins-Chrisite Labs.

Al Heialy has also served as Director of 1st year medical program at Alfaisal University (2015–2016) and then moved on to become a senior lecturer of physiology (2014–2016). Then since 2017–Present she has worked as an adjunct professor at McGill University, while also being an Assistant to associate professor of Immunonlogy at Mohammed Bin Rashid University of Medicine and Health Sciences, UAE (List of medical schools in the Middle East) from 2017 to Present.

== Research ==
Al Heialy has mainly studied asthma, mainly focusing on the association between asthma and obesity, both of which are global health concerns. She has also researched and interested in the role of obesity in the COVID-19 pandemic.

Al Heialy has also been funded by the Al Jalila Research Foundation for her work on the relationship between asthma and lung cancer.

== Awards and honors ==
- 2009-2010 Doctoral Fellowship for Asthma in the Workplace
- 2010-2011 Doctoral Fellowship - from Research Institute of the McGill University Health Centre, McGill University, Canada
- 2010-2011 Doctoral Fellowship from Allergen
- 2011-2012 Doctoral Fellowship - from Research Institute of the McGill University Health Centre , Canada
- 2011 Best Research Presentation: 1st prize in the PhD category - from Association des pneumologues de la province de Québec conference, Canada
- 2012 James Hogg Award: best poster presentation - from Canadian Thoracic Society Poster Competition, San Francisco, CA, USA
- 2017 L’Oreal-UNESCO for Women in Science Fellowship
- 2019 L’Oreal-UNESCO For Women in Science-International Rising Talent
