= Diana Marcela Bolaños Rodríguez =

Colombian marine biologist

- Born: 1980 (age 45–46); Bogotá, Colombia
- Education: Universidad Jorge Tadeo Lozano; University of New Hampshire
- Years active: 2003–
- Employers: University of the Andes; Universidad de Cartagena
- Known for: Tissue regeneration research
- Spouse: Joseph Dunn

Diana Marcela Bolaños Rodríguez is a Colombian marine biologist who has studied and classified various types of platyhelminths. She was a recipient of the L'Oréal-UNESCO Fellowship for Women in Science in 2010, was selected as Colombian biologist of the year in 2012, and in 2013 was named by the BBC as one of the top ten women in science in Latin America.

== Biography ==
Bolaños Rodríguez was born in 1980 in Bogotá, Colombia, and grew up there. At age 19, she enrolled in the Universidad Jorge Tadeo Lozano at the campus in Santa Marta on the Caribbean side of Colombia. After completing her undergraduate work with a thesis on flatworms, in 2003, Bolaños continued her education at the University of New Hampshire (UNH) in the United States. She received her PhD in zoology from UNH in Durham, New Hampshire, in 2008 with an Award for Excellence in Research from the Department of Zoology. Her research focused on polyclad flatworms, a marine worm which is unique in its ability to generate tissue through stem cells.

She married an American, Joseph Dunn, whom she had met while in New Hampshire, and in 2008 returned to Colombia to continue her research, completing a database of flatworm species and their taxonomic groups. Bolaños also took a teaching post as a visiting professor for the University of the Andes (Uniandes).

In 2010, she was awarded a L'Oréal-UNESCO Fellowship for Women in Science and she used the award to complete her postdoctoral research at Uniandes. Bolaños then took a post as an assistant professor in the Biology Program at the Universidad de Cartagena. In 2012, she was named Colombian biologist of the year and in 2013 was named one of the top ten women scientists in Latin America by the BBC.

Bolaños has continued her research and is working on comparisons between polyclads, planarians and other types of platyhelminths and their abilities to regenerate. In addition, she has published numerous articles in international, peer-reviewed journals such as Evolution & Development, the Journal of Natural History and Zootaxa in the areas of evolution and biological systematics, as well as continuing her education at courses such as the Society for Developmental Biology short course held in Montevideo, Uruguay. The flatworm Bisacculosuteri marcelae was named in her honor in 2019.

== Selected works ==
- Bolaños Rodríguez, Diana Marcela; Quiroga Cárdenas, Sigmer Yamuruk (2003). Taxonomía y anotaciones ecológicas de los gusanos planos marinos de vida libre (Platyhelminthes: Turbellaria: Polycladida) asociados al litoral rocoso del área de Santa Marta, Caribe Colombiano (Thesis) (in Spanish). Bogotá, Colombia: Universidad Jorge Tadeo Lozano.
- Bolaños Rodríguez, Diana Marcela; Quiroga Cárdenas, Sigmer Yamuruk; Litvaitis, Marian K (2004). "A new acotylean flatworm, Armatoplana colombiana sp. nov. (Platyhelminthes: Polycladida: Stylochoplanidae) from the Caribbean coast of Colombia, South America". Zootaxa. 1162: 53–64. ISSN 1175-5334.
- Quiroga Cárdenas, Sigmer Yamuruk; Bolaños Rodríguez, Diana Marcela; Litvaitis, Marian K (2004). "A checklist of polyclad flatworms (Platyhelminthes: Polycladida) from the Caribbean coast of Colombia, South America". Zootaxa. 1163: 1–12. ISSN 1175-5334.
- Quiroga Cárdenas, Sigmer Yamuruk; Bolaños Rodríguez, Diana Marcela; Litvaitis, Marian K (2004). "Polycladidos (Platyhelminthes:¿Turbellaria¿) del Atlántico Tropical Occidental". Revista Biota Colombiana. 5 (2): 159–172. ISSN 0124-5376.
- Quiroga Cárdenas, Sigmer Yamuruk; Ardila Espitia, Nestor Enrique; Bolaños Rodríguez, Diana Marcela (2004). "Aphelodoris antillensis Berg, 1897 (Opisthobranchia: Nudibranchia: Halgerdidae), new record from the Colombian Caribbean". Colombia Boletín de Investigaciones Marinas y Costeras. 33. Consejo Editorial Invemar: 257–259. ISSN 0122-9761.
- Quiroga Cárdenas, Sigmer Yamuruk; Bolaños Rodríguez, Diana Marcela; Litvaitis, Marian K (2006). "First description of deep-sea polyclad flatworms from the North Pacific: Anocellidus n. gen. profundus n. sp. (Anocellidae, n. fam.) and Oligocladus voightae n. sp. (Euryleptidae)". Zootaxa. 1317: 1–19. doi:10.11646/zootaxa.1317.1.1. ISSN 1175-5334.
- Quiroga Cárdenas, Sigmer Yamuruk; Bolaños Rodríguez, Diana Marcela; Litvaitis, Marian K (2007). "Five new species of cotylean flatworms (Platyhelminthes: Polycladida) from the wider Caribbean". Zootaxa. 1650: 1–23. ISSN 1175-5334.
- Quiroga Cárdenas, Sigmer Yamuruk; Bolaños Rodríguez, Diana Marcela; Litvaitis, Marian K (2008). "Two new species of flatworms (Platyhelminthes: Polycladida) from the continental slope of the Gulf of Mexico". Journal of the Marine Biological Association of the United Kingdom. 88 (7). Cambridge University Press: 1363–1370. Bibcode:2008JMBUK..88.1363Q. doi:10.1017/s0025315408002105. ISSN 0025-3154.
- Litvaitis, Marian K; Bolaños Rodríguez, Diana Marcela; Quiroga Cárdenas, Sigmer Yamuruk (2010). "When names are wrong and colours deceive: unraveling the Pseudoceros bicolor species complex (Polycladida)". Journal of Natural History. 44 (13–14): 829–845. doi:10.1080/00222930903537074. ISSN 1464-5262.
- Bolaños Rodríguez, Diana Marcela; Liana, Marcin; Litvaitis, Marian K; Quiroga Cárdenas, Sigmer Yamuruk (2012). "Comparative morphology of the epidermis of seven species of polyclad". Zoologischer Anzeiger. 251 (3). Gustav Fischer Verlag: 206–214. doi:10.1016/j.jcz.2011.09.001. ISSN 0044-5231.
- Bolaños Rodríguez, Diana Marcela; Bonilla León, Edna Carolina; Brown Almeida, Federico David (November 2012). "El maravillos mundo de los policládidos". HipÓtesis (in Spanish). 13. Apuntes Científicos Uniandinos: 21–24.
