= Karin Jacobs =

German physicist

- Education: University of Konstanz
- Scientific career
- Fields: Soft Materials, Micro- and Nanofluidics, Polymer Physics, Bioadhesion
- Workplaces: Saarland University (current), Bayer, University of Ulm, Max Planck Institute of Colloids and Interfaces
- Thesis: Stabilität und Dynamik flüssiger Polymerfilme (1997)

Karin Jacobs is a German physicist specializing in micro-fluidics and adhesion at micro- and nanometer scales. She is a professor at the Saarland University.

== Life and career ==
Jacobs was born in Baden-Württemberg, Germany, and completed her Abitur at Fürstenberg-Gymnasium Donaueschingen in 1986. She then went on to study physics at the University of Konstanz, where she also received her doctorate in 1997. After completing her doctorate, Jacobs went on to perform postdoctoral research at the Max Planck Institute of Colloids and Interfaces. She subsequently became a research assistant in the Department of Applied Physics at the University of Ulm, after which she worked as a project manager at Bayer in their polymers division. In 2003, Jacobs became a professor at Saarland University. She became a fellow of the Leibniz Institute for New Materials in 2014. She is active in the Scientists for Future movement combating human-induced climate change.

== Research ==
Jacobs' research focuses on microfluidics, (bio-)adhesion at microscale and nanoscale, and functional materials

== Science Outreach ==
In addition to her scientific research, Jacobs initiated a science outreach project, Lab in a Box. Through this initiative, students are introduced to fundamental concepts of physics through simple experiments that they can do at home or in the classroom.

== Awards and memberships ==
Jacobs is a member of the Akademie der Wissenschaften und der Literatur. In 1996, she was given the Byk Prize from Altana through their Herbert-Quandt-Stiftung. In the following year, she received the Schloeßmann Prize from the Max Planck Society. She gave the Beller Lecture, awarded to distinguished scientists from outside of the United States, of the American Physical Society in 2015. She has been a member of the German Council of Science and Humanities since 2016.
