= Peggoty Mutai =

Kenyan chemist

- Born: Kericho, Kenya
- Education: University of Cape Town, University of Nairobi
- Awards: UNESCO-L’Oreal Fellowship for Young Women in Life Sciences
- Scientific career
- Fields: Pharmacognosy and Pharmacology
- Workplaces: University of Nairobi
- Thesis: The Medicinal Chemistry Progression of Phytochemicals from Dalbergia melanoxylon as potential antimycobacterial and antitumor agents (2014)

Peggoty Mutai is a Kenyan chemist.

== Biography ==
Born in Kericho, her interests include medicinal chemistry, in particular working with the search for new treatments against parasitic worms.

After studying at the University of Nairobi, Kenya, where she obtained her Bachelor of Science and her master's degree in pharmacy and pharmaceutical analysis, she was accepted at McGill University in Canada to continue pursuing her doctorate, which she had started at the University of Cape Town, South Africa. Mutai returned to the University of Cape town to finish her doctorate in 2014. Mutai was among the fifteen Fellows chosen by the L'Oréal-UNESCO Awards for Women in Science to receive an international scholarship to pursue their research projects in 2012. She is currently a lecturer for the department of Pharmacology and Pharmacognosy at the University of Nairobi and the section head of Pharmacognosy.

She has stated that her love of science was stimulated by her love of nature and the serene natural environment she experienced in childhood.

== Research ==
Mutai's doctoral research involved studying parasitic worms and neglected tropical diseases. Her subsequent research interests have included treatments for neglected tropical diseases.
