= Ho Weang Kee =

Malaysian statistician

- Education: Northumbria University (BSc(Hons)); Newcastle University (PhD)
- Children: 1
- Scientific career
- Fields: Biostatistics; Epidemiology; Statistical genetics
- Workplaces: National Institute for Health Research; University of Cambridge; University of Nottingham Malaysia Campus
- Doctoral advisor: Robin Henderson

Ho Weang Kee is a Malaysian statistician whose research focuses on the application of statistical methods to genetic data analysis. She is an associate professor of statistics at the University of Nottingham Malaysia Campus in the Department of Applied Mathematics. In 2018, Ho received the L'Oréal-UNESCO International Rising Talent Award in recognition of her work toward developing a predictive model estimating the risk of breast cancer for Southeast Asian women.

== Education ==
Ho attended Northumbria University from 2002 to 2005 and graduated with a Bachelor of Science with Honours (BSc(Hons)) degree in Mathematics. In 2005, she began her graduate studies in mathematics at Newcastle University. Ho's early interest in mathematics eventually inspired her to study statistics. Her doctoral advisor, biostatistician Robin Henderson, introduced her to the potential applications of mathematics and statistics in answering scientific questions. Ho conducted research on how to approach and account for incomplete data in longitudinal and survival studies. She completed her Doctor of Philosophy (PhD) degree in 2009.

== Career and research ==
Ho's first postdoctoral research experience was at the National Institute for Health Research, where she applied advanced mathematic methodology to child speech and development studies and trained health professionals in the use of statistical methods. In 2010, Ho returned to Newcastle University to conduct postdoctoral research in its School of Mathematics and Statistics. From January 2011 to April 2013, Ho worked as a medical and genetic statistician at the University of Cambridge Department of Public Health and Primary Care.

=== Predicting breast cancer risk ===
In May 2013, Ho left the United Kingdom and returned to Malaysia. A month later, in June 2013, she joined the University of Nottingham Malaysia Campus as an assistant professor in the Department of Applied Mathematics and was promoted to associate professor in 2017. Rather than the rare mutations of BRCA1 and BRCA2, the relatively common and more subtle variations associated with breast cancer are of greater interest to Ho. While having only one of these variations typically results in little to no effect on an individual's health, inheriting a combination of these variations could be detrimental for breast cancer risk. Thus, the goal of Ho's current research is to determine which combination of variations associated with breast cancer risk will result in the greatest predicted breast cancer risk. Ho's research utilizes research led by her friend and colleague Teo Soo Hwang, the CEO of Cancer Research Malaysia, the largest breast cancer study in Malaysia. The motivation behind Ho's research is to improve the efficiency and effectiveness of breast cancer screening in Malaysia, where the number of breast cancer cases are expected to increase by 50% in the next decade. By identifying women with a greater risk of developing breast cancer, Ho hopes to establish a more personalized, patient-centered breast cancer screening program. She was awarded the L'Oréal-UNESCO Malaysia For Women in Science Fellowship for her work in 2017, and named a L'Oréal-UNESCO International Rising Talent in 2018.

== Publications ==
- Ho WK, Henderson R, Philipson PM. Tests for Hazard Transformation. Stat Biosci. 2010;2:41-64. doi:10.1007/s12561-010-9020-3.
- The CARDIoGRAMplusC4D Consortium, Deloukas P, Kanoni S, ..., Ho WK, ..., Watkins H, Schunkert H, Samani NJ. Large-scale association analysis identifies new risk loci for coronary artery disease. Nat Genet. 2013;45:25-33. doi:10.1038/ng.2480.
- Matthews JNS, Henderson R, Farewell DM, Ho WK, Rodgers LR. Dropout in crossover and longitudinal studies: Is complete case so bad? Stat Methods Med Res. 2014;23(1):60-73. doi:10.1177/0962280212445838.
- Hassan N, Ho WK, Mariapun S, Teo SH. A cross sectional study on the motivators for Asian women to attend opportunistic mammography screening in a private hospital in Malaysia: the MyMammo study. BMC Public Health. 2015;15:548. doi:10.1186/s12889-015-1892-1.
- Mariapun S, Ho WK, Kang PCE, Li J, Lindström S, Yip CH, Teo SH. Variants in 6q25.1 Are Associated with Mammographic Density in Malaysian Chinese Women. Cancer Epidemiol Biomarkers Prev. 2016;25(2):327-333. doi:10.1158/1055-9965.EPI-15-0746.

== Personal life ==
Ho and her husband gave birth to a boy in 2013. In an interview, Ho challenged the lack of support for women in STEM by stating that achieving balance between work and family is possible

== Awards and recognitions ==
- 2017 - L'Oréal-UNESCO Malaysia For Women in Science Fellowship
- 2018 - L'Oréal-UNESCO International Rising Talent Award
- 2019 - Asian Scientist 100, Asian Scientist
