= Jiban Jyoti Panda =

Indian scientist

- Born: India
- Citizenship: India (by birth)
- Education: International Centre for Genetic Engineering and Biotechnology; Utkal University
- Scientific career
- Fields: Biotechnology, Nano-technology
- Workplaces: Institute of Nano Science and Technology; University of Colorado Denver (USA); International Centre for Genetic Engineering and Biotechnology; Institute of Life Sciences, Odisha, India

Jiban Jyoti Panda is an Indian scientist specializing in the field of nano-biotechnology. She received the UNESCO - L`Oreal For Women in Science Fellowship.

== Education ==
Panda started her education by enrolling at Utkal University in the state of Odisha in India. She completed her Bachelor of Science (Honours) in chemistry, zoology and botany in 2003. She subsequently completed her Master of Science degree in the field of biotechnology from the same university in 2005. Later, she went on to complete a Ph.D. in biotechnology at the International Centre for Genetic Engineering and Biotechnology, India, in 2012.

== Research ==
Her primary interests are in the field of Nano-biotechnology. She works on the design and synthesis of novel bio-compatible and multi-functional nano-structures for achieving targeted and effective drug delivery to different organs especially the organs like brain and eye, which are protected by different physiological barriers and are inaccessible to drugs administered via the oral and parenteral routes. She also designs bio-compatible drug delivery systems for effective cancer therapy.

Developing novel methods for effective blood brain barrier delivery for treating glioblastomas and other neurodegenerative disorders as well as developing and characterizing different drug nano-formulations with enhanced activity are also her main focus of research. She has published numerous papers in peer reviewed journals.

== Publications ==
- Dube, Taru; Mandal, Saurabh; Panda, Jiban Jyoti (May 2017). "Nanoparticles generated from a tryptophan derivative: physical characterization and anti-cancer drug delivery". Amino Acids. 49 (5): 975–993. doi:10.1007/s00726-017-2403-8. ISSN 0939-4451.
- Alam S, Panda JJ, Mukherjee TK, Chauhan VS. Short peptide based nanotubes capable of effective curcumin delivery for treating drug resistant malaria. J Nanobiotechnology. 2016 Apr 5;14:26.
- Panda, Jiban J.; Yandrapu, Sarath; Kadam, Rajendra S.; Chauhan, Virander S.; Kompella, Uday B. (September 2016). "Retracted: Self-assembled Phenylalanine-α,β-dehydrophenylalanine Nanotubes for Sustained Intravitreal Delivery of a Multi-targeted Tyrosine Kinase Inhibitor". Journal of Controlled Release. 237: 186. doi:10.1016/j.jconrel.2016.07.039. PMC 6497139. PMID 27521264.
- Panda, Jiban J; Mishra, Jibanananda (February 2016). "Self-Assembled Dipeptide-Based Nanostructures: Tiny Tots with Great Applications". Therapeutic Delivery. 7 (2): 59–62. doi:10.4155/tde.15.85. ISSN 2041-5990.
- Panda JJ, Chauhan VS. Short Peptide Based Self-Assembled Nanostructures: Implication In Drug Delivery And Tissue Engineering. Polymer Chemistry, under review.
- Sofi Beaula W, Gowri M, Panda JJ, Rajeswari K, Venkateshbabu N, Rabel, AM, Kandaswamy D, Chauhan VS and Ganesh.V. European Journal of Dentistry, accepted.
- Panda JJ, Yandrapu, S, Kadam, RS, Chauhan, VS, and Kompella, UB. Self-assembled phenylalanine-α,β-dehydrophenylalanine nanotubes for 2 sustained intravitreal delivery of a multi-targeted tyrosine kinase inhibitor. Journal of Controlled Release, 2013, 172(3):1151-60.
- Panda JJ, Varsheney A and Chauhan VS. Self-assembled nanoparticles based on modified cationic dipeptides and DNA: novel systems for gene delivery. Journal of Nanobiotechnology, 2013, 11:18.
- Panda JJ, Kaul A, Kumar S, Alam S, Mishra AK, Kundu, GC, Chauhan, VS. Modified dipeptide nanoparticles: vehicles for tumor targeted delivery. Nanomedicine, 2013, 8, 1927-1942.
- Alam S, *Panda JJ, Chauhan VS. Novel dipeptide nanoparticles for effective curcumin delivery. International Journal of Nanomedicine, 2012:7 4207–4222.*Both the authors have equal contribution.
- Panda JJ, Dua R, Mishra A, Mittra B, Chauhan VS. 3D cell growth and proliferation on a RGD functionalized nanofibrillar hydrogel based on a conformationally restricted residue containing dipeptide. Acs Applied Materials and Interfaces, 2010, 2, 2839-48.
- Panda JJ, Mishra A, Basu A, Chauhan VS. Stimuli responsive self-assembled hydrogel of a low molecular weight free dipeptide with potential for tunable drug delivery. Biomacromolecules (2008), 9(8): 2244–2250.
- Panda JJ, Kaul A, Alam S, Babbar AK, Mishra AK, Chauhan VS. Designed peptides as model self-assembling nanosystems: characterization and potential biomedical applications. Therapeutic delivery, 2011.
- Mishra A, Panda JJ, Basu A, Chauhan VS. Nanovesicles based on self-assembly of conformationally constrained aromatic residue containing amphiphilic dipeptides. Langmuir (2008), 24(9): 4571-4576.
- Rout GR, Senapati SK, Panda JJ. Selection of salt tolerant plants of Nicotiana tabacum L. through in vitro and its biochemical characterization. Acta Biol Hung. 2008 Mar; 59(1):77-92.
- Sahoo SK, Parveen S, Panda JJ. The present and future of nanotechnology in human health care. Journal of Nanomedicine: Nanotechnology, Biology and Medicine. (2007), 3(1): 20-31. IF: 8. Number one in the top 25 hottest article of the journal.
