= Duygu Sag =

Turkish immunologist

Duygu Sag is a Turkish immunologist who contributed to the understanding of the human immune system's fight against cancer. She was the recipient of the 2018 “L'Oreal UNESCO International Rising Talent Award”, which is one of the L'Oréal-UNESCO For Women in Science Awards.

== Research ==
Sag's research centers on harnessing the immune system's potential to combat cancer by targeting specific tumor-associated macrophages. Her team identified that macrophages lacking the cholesterol transporter ABCG1 exhibit a transformative shift, becoming potent tumor-fighting agents and impeding bladder cancer progression in preclinical studies. The eventual goal is elucidating the molecular mechanisms underlying this critical macrophage switch, with the potential to pave the way for innovative immunotherapeutic approaches in cancer treatment.

== Biography ==
Sag completed her undergraduate studies in Middle East Technical University in Ankara, Turkey. She completed her doctoral studies at the University of Louisville School of Medicine. Between 2009 and 2015, was a postdoctoral fellow at the La Jolla Institute for Immunology located in San Diego, California, US. Then she returned to Turkey, becoming a faculty member at Izmir Biomedicine and Genome Center within Dokuz Eylul University. The cancer-related deaths in her immediate family motivated her to become a cancer researcher.
