= Josep Carreras Leukaemia Research Institute =

Biomedical research centre Catalonia

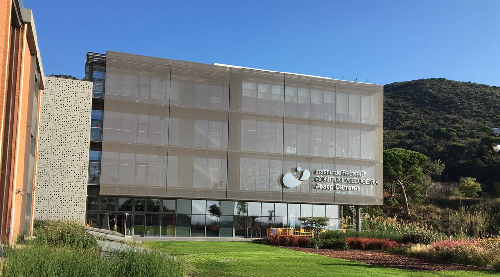
- Josep Carreras Leukaemia Research Institute Headquarters
- Abbreviation: IJC
- Named after: José Carreras
- Formation: 2010
- Type: Research Institute
- Headquarters: Ctra de Can Ruti, Camí de les Escoles, s/n Institut de Recerca Contra la Leucèmia Josep Carreras
- Location: Spain
- Fields: blood cancers, leukemia, lymphoma, hematopoietic system disease, bone marrow, myeloid neoplasm
- Director: Ari Melnick
- Website: http://www.carrerasresearch.org/

The Josep Carreras Leukaemia Research Institute (IJC) is a research centre established in 2010 by the Government of Catalonia and the Josep Carreras Private Foundation. It is recognised worldwide as a leading centre in biomedical research in the field of haematological cancers.

Since 2025, the Director of the Josep Carreras Leukaemia Research Institute is the researcher Ari Melnick.

== Mission and research approach ==
The Josep Carreras Leukaemia Research Institute conducts research on Blood Cancers, with an emphasis on improving understanding, diagnosis, and treatment of these diseases.

Its strategic plan is structured around three main pillars: specialised research groups focused on solving urgent clinical challenges using the most advanced technology and covering all stages of research; a translational research programme that seeks to apply laboratory findings to clinical practice; and a Computational Diagnosis Centre that integrates biological data with Artificial Intelligence to support the development of new diagnostic and therapeutic approaches.

== Organisation ==
The IJC is a CERCA centre of excellence (Research Centres of Catalonia) and it is accredited as a Severo Ochoa Centre of Excellence by the Spanish Ministry of Science, Innovation and Universities - State Research Agency.

In addition to the Government of Catalonia and the Josep Carreras Foundation, organisation founded in 1988 by the tenor Josep Carreras to fight against leukaemia, the Board of Trustees of the IJC also includes representatives from the University of Barcelona, the Autonomous University of Barcelona and the City Council of Badalona.

The IJC has six independent yet interconnected scientific locations: Can Ruti, Clínic, Sant Pau, Mar, Trueta and Sant Joan de Déu. Its headquarters are located at the Can Ruti location in Badalona, which was inaugurated in 2018. Covering more than 10,000 square metres, it hosts hundreds of researchers, both national and international, working together to find a cure for blood cancers.
