= Johannie Maria Spaan =

South African wildlife biologist

- Education: Tshwane University of Technology; University of Pretoria
- Alma mater: Oregon State University
- Known for: Infection studies on Cape Buffalo
- Scientific career
- Fields: wildlife biologist
- Institutions: Entabeni Private Game Reserve
- Thesis: Stress Physiology in Free-ranging Female African Buffalo (Syncerus caffer): Environmental Drivers, and Immunological and Infection Consequences. (2018)
- Doctoral advisor: Anna E. Jolles

Johannie Maria Spaan is a South African wildlife biologist.

After her studies in zoology and ecology at Tshwane University of Technology, her first works consisted in conducting behavioral studies on Cape ground squirrels. She also studied at the University of Pretoria, and was accepted at the College of Veterinary Medicine, Oregon State University in the USA to finish her doctorate thesis. Her research to that point focused on the impact of treating parasitic worm infestations in African buffalo and its impact on humans. Spaan was among the fifteen Fellows chosen by the L'Oréal-UNESCO Awards for Women in Science to receive an international scholarship to pursue their research projects.

== Work ==
After completing her B.Tech (Nature conservation) at Tshwane University of Technology in 2005, Spaan continued her field work on the Cape Ground Squirrel as a Research Technician for Florida University through the University of Pretoria and concluded this work in January 2006. In March 2006 she moved to Entabeni Private Game Reserve in the Limpopo Province of South Africa where she worked as a researcher and "gamerange manager" until April 2008. From May 2008 to August 2012 she worked as a research assistant on the TB Buffalo Project KNP on behalf of Oregon State University and the University of Georgia.

In September 2012 she enrolled in the PhD program of the Zoology department of Oregon State University. Spaan completed the PhD in 2018 with a dissertation entitled Stress Physiology in Free-ranging Female African Buffalo (Syncerus caffer): Environmental Drivers, and Immunological and Infection Consequences.
