= Urtė Neniškytė =

Lithuanian neuroscientist (b. 1983)

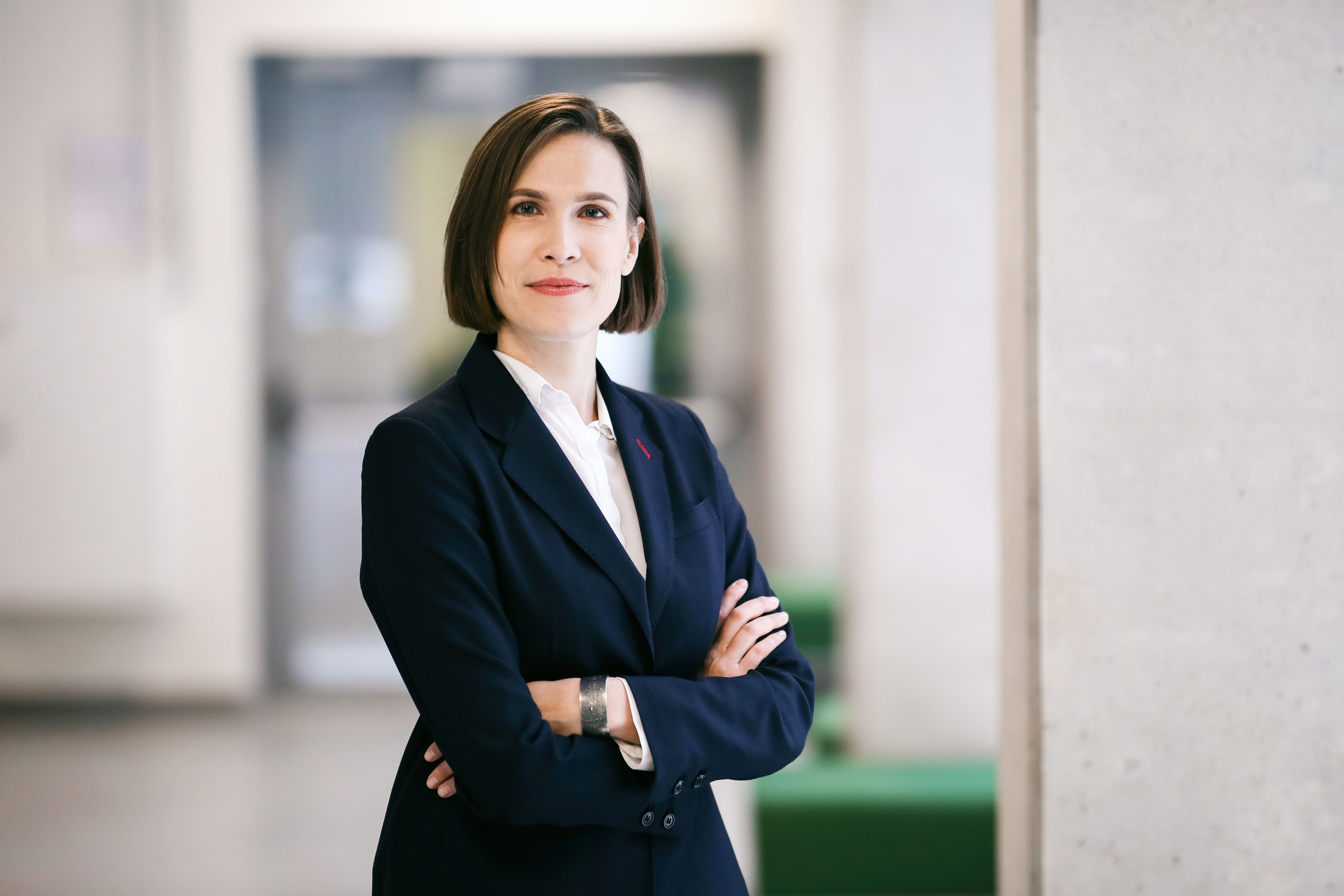
- Born: 2 November 1983 (age 42); Vilnius
- Citizenship: Lithuanian
- Education: University of Cambridge, Vilnius University
- Awards: L'Oréal-UNESCO Baltic For Women in Science fellowship 2017; L'Oréal-UNESCO For Women in Science International Rising Talents; 2019
- Scientific career
- Fields: neuroscience, biochemistry
- Thesis: Amyloid β and microglial phagocytosis (2012)

Urtė Neniškytė (born 2 November 1983) is a Lithuanian neuroscientist. Her scientific interest and main area of work relates to the interaction of neurons and immune cells in the brain. She has studied the cellular mechanisms of Alzheimer's disease and is the co-author of the first articles about cell death in relation to phagocytosis.

== Education ==
Neniškytė completed her bachelor's degree in biochemistry at the Vilnius University in June, 2006. During her bachelor's program she did an internship at the European Molecular Biology Laboratory in Heidelberg, Germany. She carried out her bachelor thesis work on "Investigation of retrograde transport of heat shock protein Hsp47" at the Cell Biology and Biophysics Unit of the EMBL. Neniškytė continued with her education at the Vilnius University and was awarded with a Master of Biochemistry in 2008. Her master thesis work on "Application of microRNAs for fluorescent microscopy-based functional analysis" was done at the BioQuant institute (Center for Quantitative Analysis of Molecular and Cellular Biosystems) at Heidelberg University, Germany. She completed her PhD program in biochemistry at the St John's College of the University of Cambridge, UK in July, 2012. Her doctoral thesis subject was "Amyloid β and microglial phagocytosis". The thesis objective was to determine the role of microglial phagocytic function in neuronal loss induced by Alzheimer‘s disease peptide Aβ. By virtue of knock-out animal cell cultures and pharmacological manipulations she demonstrated that neuronal loss induced by subneurotoxic concentrations of Aβ was mediated by microglial phagocytosis.

== Career ==
In February 2012 Neniškytė gained a research associate position at the Department of Biochemistry of the University of Cambridge. She participated in a collaborative project with Professor Peter St George-Hyslop on the risk genes of late-onset Alzheimer’s disease and how they modulate microglial activation. Following that, she was a short- term fellow at the Neuroscience Institute of LSMU, Kaunas.

In November 2012 Neniškytė begun to work as a scientific consultant at UAB Expertus Vilnensis. She contributed to the development of automated anatomical pathology in Lithuania.

From 2013 to 2016 Neniškytė was a trainee at the EMBL under the post-doctoral Marie Skłodowska-Curie programme. She investigated the role of synaptic pruning during development, in order to identify candidate molecular tags that mediate discrimination between weak and strong synapses during circuit maturation.

Neniškytė currently works as Marie Sklodowska Curie Experienced Researcher at the Department of Neurobiology and Biophysics of Life Science Center at the Vilnius University. Her group aims to define molecular signalling pathways that drive developmental pruning of unnecessary synapses, during which immune brain cells remove unnecessary connections from the developing neuron network, creating the conditions for the formation of a structurally and functionally developed network.

Since 2006 she is a member of the Lithuanian Biochemical Society and the Lithuanian Neuroscience Association and since 2017 a board member of the Research Council of Lithuania. She is also a member of the Biochemical Society (2010), Society for Neuroscience (2013) and Young IBRO.

== Awards ==
In recognition of her scientific achievements Neniškytė was awarded L'Oréal-UNESCO Baltic For Women in Science fellowship on 26 May, 2017. She is the first Lithuanian scientist to be presented with the award. Neniškytė is also one of the 15 laureates to receive the 2019 L'Oréal-UNESCO For Women in Science International Rising Talents award. Her other notable awards include:

International Brain Research Organization Return Home Fellowship (2017), to support the establishment of her group at the Vilnius University.

Marie Skłodowska-Curie Individual Fellowship (2016), for her project at the Vilnius University.

Marie Skłodowska-Curie Intra-European Fellowship (2012), for her project at the European Molecular Biology Laboratory.

== Publications ==
- Weinhard L, di Bartolomei G, Bolasco G, Machado P, Schieber NL, Neniskyte U, Exiga M, Vadisiute A, Raggioli A, Schertel A, Schwab Y, Gross CT. Microglia remodel synapses by presynaptic trogocytosis and spine head filopodia induction. Nat Commun. 2018 Mar 26;9(1):1228
- Weinhard L, Neniskyte U, Vadisiute A, di Bartolomei G, Aygün N, Riviere L, Zonfrillo F, Dymecki S, Gross C. Sexual dimorphism of microglia and synapses during mouse postnatal development. Dev Neurobiol. 2018 Jun;78(6):618-626
- Neniskyte U & Gross C. The errant gardener: glia -dependent developmental synaptic pruning and psychiatric disorders. Nat Rev Neurosci. 2017 Nov;18(11):658-670
- Neniskyte U, Fricker M, Brown GC. Amyloid β induces microglia to phagocytose neurons via activation of protein kinase Cs and NADPH oxidase. Int J Biochem Cell Biol. 2016 Jun 5. pii: S1357-2725(16)30139-X
- Neniskyte U, Vilalta A, Brown GC. Tumour necrosis factor alpha-induced neuronal loss is mediated by microglial phagocytosis. FEBS Lett. 2014 Aug 25;588(17):2952-6
- Neher JJ, Neniskyte U, Hornik T, Brown GC. Inhibition of UDP/P2Y6 purinergic signaling prevents phagocytosis of viable neurons by activated microglia in vitro and in vivo. Glia. 2014 Sep;62(9):1463-75
- Hornik TC, Neniskyte U, Brown GC. Inflammation induces multinucleation of Microglia via PKC inhibition of cytokinesis, generating highly phagocytic multinucleated giant cells. J Neurochem. 2014 Mar;128(5):650-61.
- Neniskyte U, Brown GC. Analysis of microglial production of reactive oxygen and nitrogen species. Methods Mol Biol. 2013;1041:103-11.
- Neniskyte U, Brown GC. Lactadherin/MFG-E8 is essential for microglia-mediated neuronal loss and phagoptosis induced by amyloid β. J Neurochem. 2013 Aug;126(3):312-7.
- Neher JJ, Neniskyte U, Brown GC. Primary phagocytosis of neurons by inflamed microglia: potential roles in neurodegeneration. Front Pharmacol. 2012 Feb 28;3:27.
- Neniskyte U, Neher JJ, Brown GC. Neuronal death induced by nanomolar amyloid β is mediated by primary phagocytosis of neurons by microglia. J Biol Chem. 2011 Nov 18;286(46):39904-13.
- Neher JJ, Neniskyte U, Zhao JW, Bal-Price A, Tolkovsky AM, Brown GC. Inhibition of microglial phagocytosis is sufficient to prevent inflammatory neuronal death. J Immunol. 2011 Apr 15;186(8):4973-83.
