= Nurcan Tunçbağ =

Medical researcher

- Education: Istanbul Technical University; Koç University
- Awards: L'Oréal-UNESCO For Women in Science Award
- Scientific career
- Workplaces: Massachusetts Institute of Technology; Middle East Technical University

Nurcan Tunçbağ is a Professor of Chemical and Biological Engineering at Koç University. She works on computational models of complex biological systems. Tunçbağ is a 2019 L'Oréal-UNESCO For Women in Science International Rising Talent.

== Early life and education ==
Tunçbağ studied chemical engineering at Istanbul Technical University. She joined Koç University for her graduate studies, earning a master's degree in computational science and engineering in 2007. She remained there for her doctoral studies, studying protein interactions and their incorporation into protein interaction networks. She worked under the supervision of Özlem Keskin and Attila Gürsoy. In 2010, Tunçbağ joined Massachusetts Institute of Technology as a postdoctoral associate with Ernest Fraenkel. In 2014, Tunçbağ joined the Middle East Technical University Informatics Institute. She is the PI of the Network Modeling Lab at Koç University.

== Research ==
Tunçbağ works on computational models of complex biological systems. She was in the developer team of the PRISM (protein interactions by structural matching) algorithm that can be used to predict protein–protein interactions and assembly. PRISM can be used to construct cellular pathways and proteome annotation. The algorithm can be used to identify 'hot spot' protein binding regions, which can be used to target drugs.

Regulatory and signalling networks are essential for cellular function, but omic data is often of poor quality. Tunçbağ has demonstrated how this data can be analysed using a prize collecting Steiner tree, analysing changes in networks during disease. She can incorporate pharmaceutical and biological agents into her algorithm to help inform future therapeutics. With Fraenkel, Tunçbağ created SteinerNet, a web server that allowed the integration of omic data. Users provide information about proteins and genes that have been experimentally detected, and the server looks for connections in the data using a series of interactomes. She was also in the developer team of Omics Integrator software that integrates multi-omic data to reconstruct signaling networks.

Tunçbağ looks to identify how the genome is altered during disease. One of the diseases considered by Tunçbağ is Glioblastoma, a particularly malignant brain tumour. Tunçbağ developed a network model that can be used to identify tumour pathway-level changes. She has also worked on neurodegenerative diseases including Parkinson's disease. She was made an associate professor in 2017.

== Awards and honours ==
- 2015: Science Academy Young Scientist Award
- 2017: METU Parlar Foundation Science Award
- 2017: L'Oréal-UNESCO For Women in Science Award
- 2018: TÜBA-GEBİP Award
- 2019: L'Oréal-UNESCO For Women in Science International Rising Talent
- 2020: Election to the Global Young Academy
