= Bouzat =

Bouzat is a French surname. Notable people with the surname include:

- Agustín Bouzat (born 1994), Argentine footballer
- Cecilia Bouzat (born 1961), Argentine neuroscientist
