= L'Oréal-UNESCO For Women in Science Awards =

Scientific award

L'Oréal-UNESCO For Women in Science International Awards
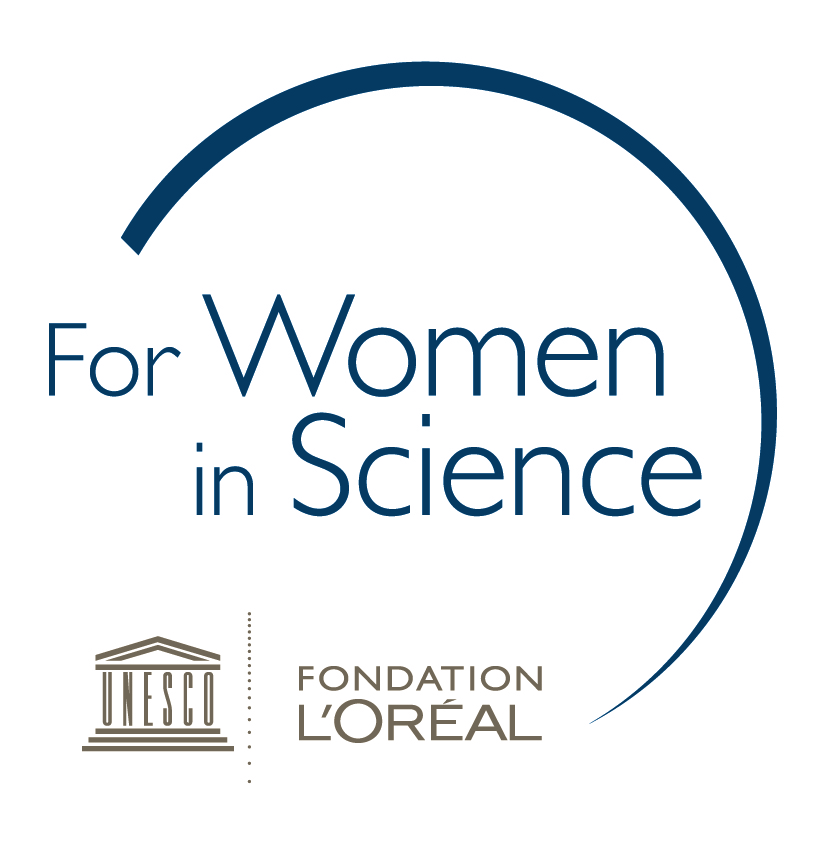
- L'Oréal-UNESCO For Women in Science Programme
- Presented by: UNESCO
- Website: https://www.forwomeninscience.com/

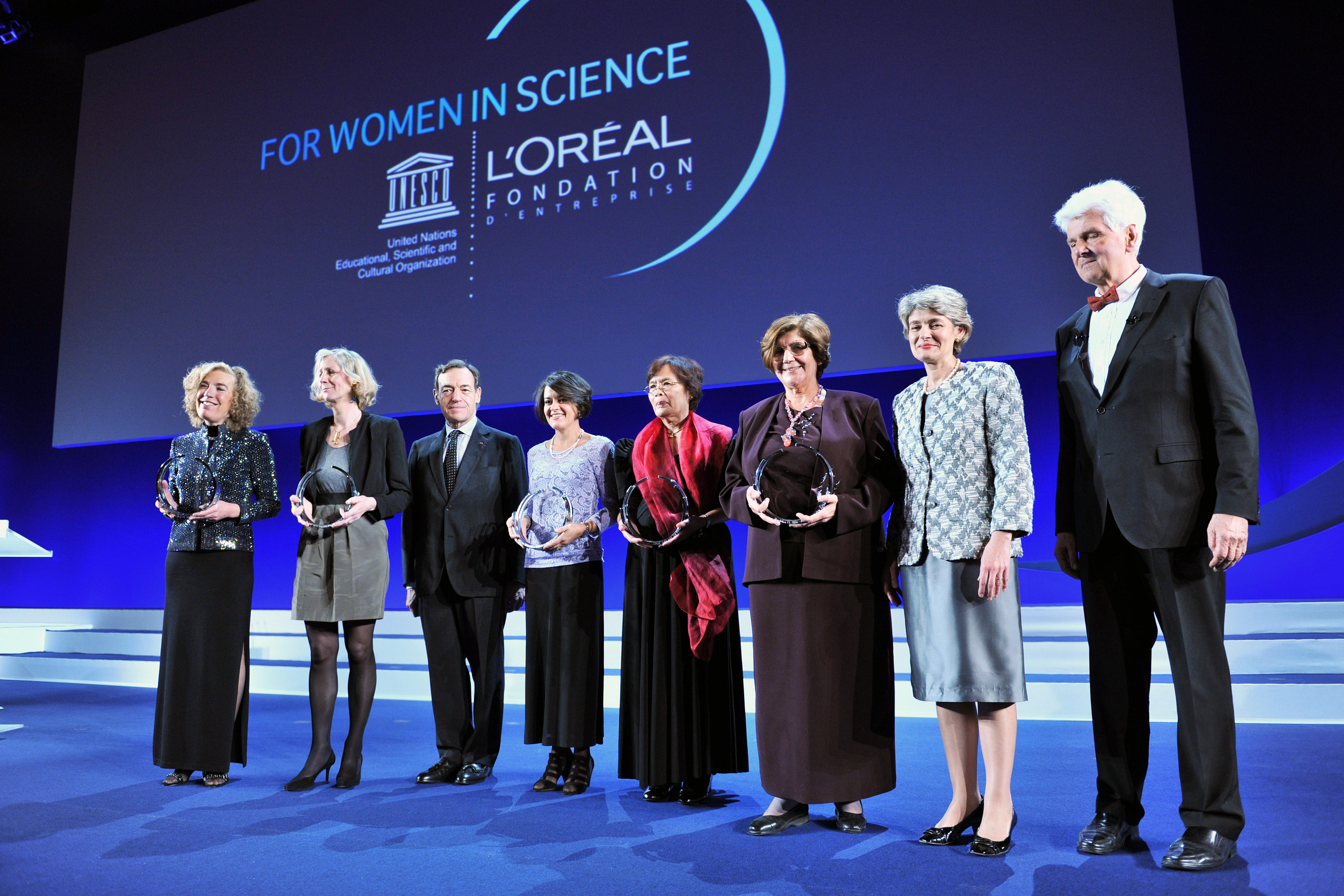
The winners of the 2010 UNESCO-L'Oréal Prize for Women in Science Awards Ceremony at UNESCO Headquarters, Paris – From left to right; Elaine Fuchs (United States of America), Anne Dejean-Assémat (France), Sir Lindsay Owen-Jones, Chairman of L'Oréal, Alejandra Bravo (Mexico), Lourdes J. Cruz (Philippines), Rashika El Ridi (Egypt), Ms Irina Bokova, Director-General of UNESCO, and Günter Blobel, Nobel Prize in Medicine 1999.

The L'Oréal-UNESCO For Women in Science International Awards, created in 1998, aim to improve the position of women in science by recognizing outstanding women researchers who have contributed to scientific progress. The awards are a result of a partnership between the Foundation of the French company L'Oréal and the United Nations Educational, Scientific and Cultural Organization (UNESCO) and carry a grant of $100,000 USD for each laureate. This award is also known as the L'Oréal-UNESCO Women in Science Awards.

Each year an international jury awards five laureates, selecting one from each of the following regions:

- Africa and the Arab States.
- Asia and the Pacific
- Europe
- Latin America and the Caribbean
- North America (since 2000)

Eligibility requirements alternate every other year based on scientific discipline with laureates in life sciences recognized in even years and laureates in physical sciences, mathematics and computer science recognized in odd years (since 2003).

The same partnership awards the UNESCO-L'Oréal International Fellowships, providing up to $40,000 USD in funding over two years to fifteen young women scientists engaged in exemplary and promising research projects. The Fellowship awards began in 2000 with a one-year award of US$20,000 and offered ten awards until 2003. In 2003, the number of awards increased to 15 and then in 2006, the grant period extended to two years and the amount of the award increased to US$40,000. In 2015, the name Rising Talent Grants was implemented.

As of 2023, 7 L'Oréal-UNESCO laureates have won also a Nobel Prize, these are: Christiane Nüsslein-Volhard in Physiology or Medicine (1995 - unlike the others, she had won the Nobel Prize before receiving this International Award), Elizabeth Blackburn in Physiology or Medicine (2009), Ada Yonath in Chemistry (2009), Emmanuelle Charpentier in Chemistry (2020), Jennifer Doudna in Chemistry (2020), Katalin Karikó in Physiology or Medicine (2023) and Anne L'Huillier in Physics (2023).

== Recipients ==
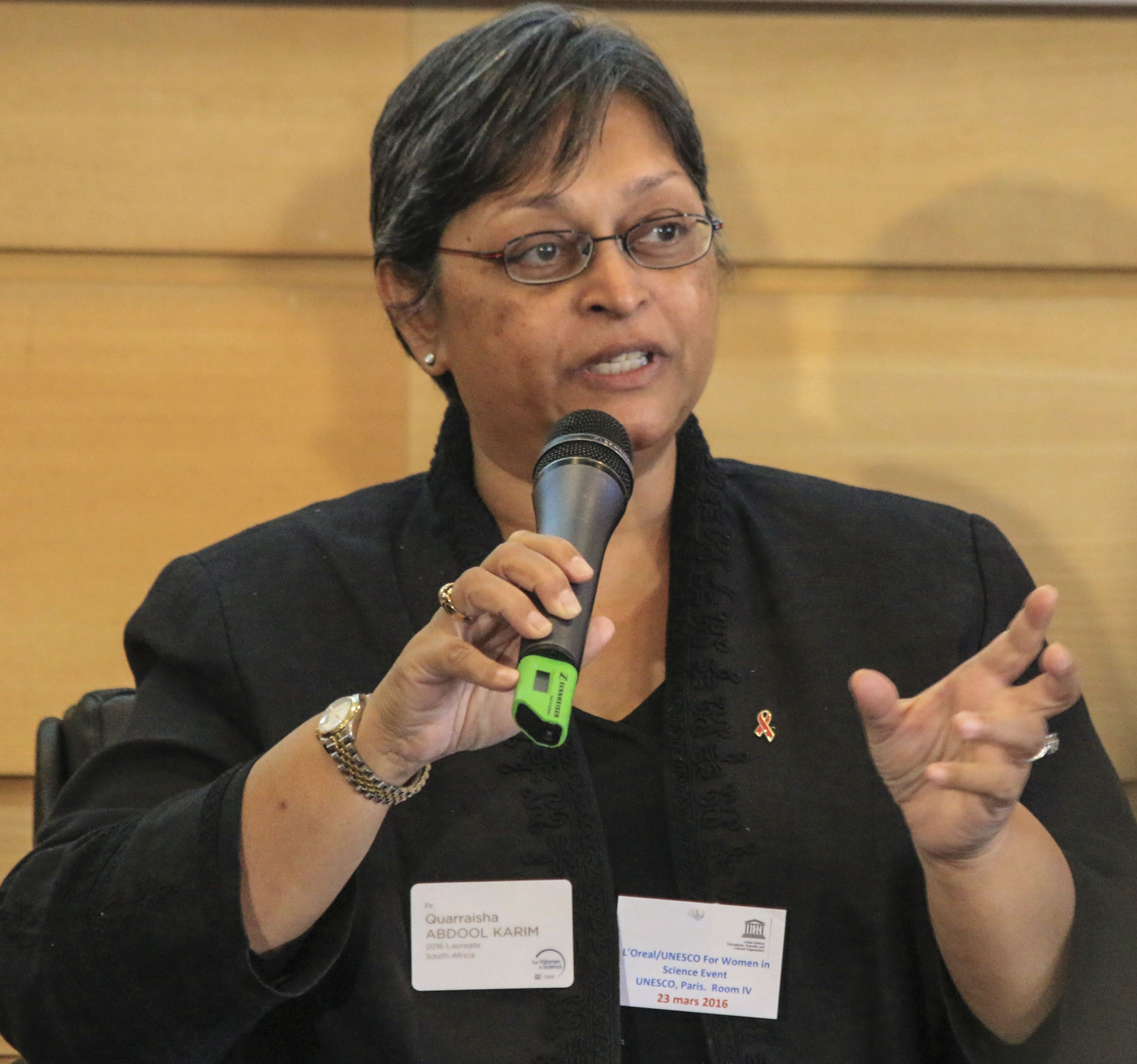
Quarraisha Abdool Karim was the 2016 Laureate for Africa and the Arab States

Legend:

Life sciences (LS), Life and Environmental Sciences (LES)
Physical sciences, mathematics and computer science (PMC)

Year		Laureate for	Name	Nationality	Credentials	Recognized for (her)
1998	LS	Africa and the Arab States	Grace Oladunni Taylor	Nigeria	Biochemist, scholar, university professor.	contributions to epidemiology cardio vascular disease in Africa
1998	LS	Asia and the Pacific	Yu Myeong-Hee	South Korea	Researcher and professor on micro Biological Sciences at Korean Institute of Science and Technology.	discoveries of protein folding and its relationship to human pathology
1998	LS	Europe	Pascale Cossart	France	Professor at Bacteria-Cell interaction Unit, Institut Pasteur	elucidation of the mechanisms whereby pathogenic bacteria subvert immune defenses
1998	LS	Latin America and the Caribbean	Gloria Montenegro	Chile	Professor of botany at the Faculty of Agronomy and Forestry Sciences Pontificia Universidad Católica de Chile	efforts to apply modern science to the protection of plant ecosystems
2000	LS	Africa and the Arab States	Valerie Mizrahi	South Africa	Researching at Molecular Mycobacteriology Research Unit, National Health Sciences Laboratory Service and University of the Witwatersrand	contributions to the fight against tuberculosis and other infectious diseases
2000	LS	Asia and the Pacific	Tsuneko Okazaki	Japan	Professor of Molecular Biological Sciences at the Institute of Comprehensive Medical Science, Fujita Health Sciences University	discovery of the molecular mechanism of retrograde DNA replication
2000	LS	Europe	Margarita Salas	Spain		fundamental contributions to our understanding of DNA replication
2000	LS	Latin America and the Caribbean	Eugenia María del Pino Veintimilla	Ecuador	Professor of developmental Biological Sciences at Pontifical Catholic University of Ecuador	original investigations on the Biology of marsupial tree frogs and her efforts on behalf of conservation in the Galapagos Islands.
2000	LS	North America	Joanne Chory	United States	Professor and Director Plant Molecular and Cellular Biological Sciences Laboratory Howard Hughes Medical Institute Investigator	elucidation of the mechanisms involved in the response of plant organisms to light
2000	LS	North America	Thressa Campbell Stadtman	United States		
2001	LS	Africa and the Arab States	Adeyinka Gladys Falusi	Nigeria	Professor of haematology at Institute for Medical Research & Training of the College of Medicine, University of Ibadan	molecular-genetic identification and classification of hereditary blood diseases in Africa
2001	LS	Asia and the Pacific	Suzanne Cory	Australia	Professor at The Walter and Eliza Hall Institute of Medical Research	contributions to our understanding of the genetic basis of human lymphoma and other cancerous conditions
2001	LS	Europe	Anne McLaren	United Kingdom		discoveries in reproductive Biology, which have paved the way to human assisted reproduction
2001	LS	Latin America and the Caribbean	Mayana Zatz	Brazil	Professor of genetics University of São Paulo	contributions to the pathology, diagnosis and management of hereditary
2001	LS	North America	Joan Steitz	United States	Professor of molecular Biological Sciences at Yale University	discoveries of the structure, biological functions and pathological implications of small RNA molecules
2002	LS	Africa and the Arab States	Nagwa Meguid	Egypt	Researcher at the National Research Centre, Cairo	systematic genetic investigations of Down syndrome and other neurological conditions in the Mediterranean region
2002	LS	Asia and the Pacific	Indira Nath	India	Professor at All India Institute of Medical Sciences, New Delhi - Former Founder Head of Department of Biotechnology at the All India Institute of Medical Sciences	fundamental contributions to the pathogeny, prevention and treatment of leprosy
2002	LS	Europe	Mary Osborn	Germany	International Union of Biochemistry and Molecular Biological Sciences (IUBMB). Member of University of Göttingen Research Committee	development of immunofluorescence microscopy as a tool for the study of cytoskeletal structures
2002	LS	Europe	Marianne Grunberg-Manago	France		lifetime achievements and exceptional participation in the development of modern molecular Biology
2002	LS	Latin America and the Caribbean	Ana María López Colomé	Mexico	Professor of biochemestry at the Institute of Cellular Physiology, National Autonomous University of Mexico	discoveries of the molecular pathways involved in vision and pathological alterations
2002	LS	North America	Shirley Tilghman	United States	President, Princeton University	discovery of parental imprinting and its role in embryological development
2003	PMC	Africa and the Arab States	Ayse Erzan	Turkey	Professor at Istanbul Technical University	theoretical work on the formation of tree-like structures
2003	PMC	Africa and the Arab States	Karimat El-Sayed	Egypt	Professor of Crystallography at Ain Shams University	work on crystal growth, including the formation of kidney stones
2003	PMC	Asia and the Pacific	Li Fanghua	Hong Kong		discovery of novel techniques in electron microscopy
2003	PMC	Latin America and the Caribbean	Mariana Weissmann	Argentina	Professor at Argentine National Research Council	theoretical studies on novel forms of carbon
2003	PMC	North America	Johanna M.H. Levelt Sengers	Netherlands		experiments on critical opalescence in fluids
2004	LS	Africa and the Arab States	Jennifer Thomson	South Africa	Professor at Department of Molecular and Cell Biological Sciences. University of Cape Town	work on transgenic plants resistant to drought and to viral infections, in an effort to respond to the continent's chronic food shortage
2004	LS	Asia and the Pacific	Nancy Ip	Hong Kong	Professor at Department of Biochemistry and Biotechnology Research Institute, Hong Kong University of Science and Technology	discoveries concerning proteins which favour the growth and preservation of neurons in brain development
2004	LS	Europe	Christine Petit	France	Researcher at Genetics of Sensory Defects Laboratory Institut Pasteur	research on the molecular and cellular bases of human hereditary deafness and other sensorial deficiencies
2004	LS	Latin America and the Caribbean	Lúcia Mendonça Previato	Brazil	Professor and Researcher of Biophysics Institute, Federal University of Rio de Janeiro	studies which enable progress in the understanding, treatment and prevention of the Chagas disease
2004	LS	North America	Philippa Marrack	United States	Professor at National Jewish Medical and Research Center, Denver, Colorado	the characterization of lymphocyte T functions in the immune system and the discovery of superantigens
2005	PMC	Africa and the Arab States	Zohra ben Lakhdar	Tunisia	Professor of Physics Laboratory of Atomic-Molecular Spectroscopy and Applications, Faculty of Sciences, University of Tunis El Manar	experiments and models in infrared spectroscopy and its applications to pollution detection and medicine
2005	PMC	Asia and the Pacific	Fumiko Yonezawa	Japan	Professor Emeritus of Physics, Faculty of Science and Technology, Keio University, Kanagawa-Tokyo	pioneering theory and computer simulations on amorphous semiconductors and liquid metals
2005	PMC	Europe	Dominique Langevin	France	CNRS Directeur de Recherches Laboratory of Solid State Physics, University of Paris-Sud, Orsay	fundamental investigations on detergents, emulsions and foams
2005	PMC	Latin America and the Caribbean	Belita Koiller	Brazil	Professor of Physics at the Institute of Physics Federal University of Rio de Janeiro	innovative research on electrons in disordered matter such as glass
2005	PMC	North America	Myriam P. Sarachik	United States	Distinguished Emeritus Professor of Physics Department of Physics, City College of New York	important experiments on electrical conduction and transitions between metals and insulators
2006	LS	Africa and the Arab States	Habiba Bouhamed Chaabouni	Tunisia	Professor of Medical Genetics at University of Tunis	contribution to the analysis and prevention of hereditary disorders
2006	LS	Asia and the Pacific	Jennifer Graves	Australia	Emeritus Professor in molecular science at Australian National University, Canberra Head, Comparative Genomics Research Group Director, ARC Centre for Kangaroo Genomics	studies on the evolution of mammalian genomes
2006	LS	Europe	Christine Van Broeckhoven	Belgium	Research Project Investigator - Laboratory Director - Department director - VIB Department of Molecular Genetics Campus Drie Eiken University of Antwerp - UA Universiteitsplein 1	genetic investigation of Alzheimer's disease and other neurodegenerative diseases
2006	LS	Europe	Christiane Nüsslein-Volhard	Germany	Since October 2014 Director Emeritus of Research Group "Colour Pattern Formation" at the Max Planck Institute of Developmental Biological Sciences, Tübingen	efforts in supporting highly qualified women with children to facilitate their progress in science
2006	LS	Latin America and the Caribbean	Esther Orozco	Mexico	Professor, Patología Experimental Centro de Investigación y de Estudios Avanzados del Instituto Politécnico Nacional, Mexico City	discovery of the mechanisms and control of infections by amoebas in the tropics
2006	LS	North America	Pamela Bjorkman	United States	Max Delbruck Professor of Biological Sciences and Investigator, Howard Hughes Medical Institute California Institute of Technology (CalTech) Pasadena, California	discovery of how the immune system recognizes targets
2007	PMC	Africa and the Arab States	Ameenah Gurib-Fakim	Mauritius		exploration and analysis of plants from Mauritius and their bio-medical applications
2007	PMC	Asia and the Pacific	Margaret Brimble	New Zealand	Chair of Organic and Medicinal Chemistry, University of Auckland, Auckland	contribution to the synthesis of complex natural products, especially shellfish toxins.
2007	PMC	Europe	Tatiana Birshtein	Russia		contribution to the understanding of the shapes, sizes and motions of large molecules
2007	PMC	Latin America and the Caribbean	Ligia Gargallo	Peru	Professor, Department of Physical Chemistry Pontifical Catholic University of Chile	contributions to understanding solution properties of polymers
2007	PMC	North America	Mildred Dresselhaus	United States		research on solid state materials, including conceptualizing the creation of carbon nanotubes
2008	LS	Africa and the Arab States	Ada Yonath	Israel	Professor at the Hebrew University of Jerusalem, Weizmann Institute of Science	structural studies of the protein biosynthesis system and its disruption by antibiotics
2008	LS	Africa and the Arab States	Lihadh Al-Gazali	Iraq	Professor in Clinical Genetics and Paediatrics	contributions to the characterization of inherited disorders
2008	LS	Asia and the Pacific	V. Narry Kim	South Korea	Professor of biochemestry, cell Biological Sciences and Molecular Biological Sciences at Seoul National University	elucidating the formation of a new class of RNA molecules involved in gene regulation
2008	LS	Latin America and the Caribbean	Ana Belén Elgoyhen	Argentina	Professor of Pharmacology at the University of Buenos Aires and independent researcher of the National Scientific and Technical Research Council	contributions to the understanding of the molecular basis of hearing (sense)
2008	LS	North America	Elizabeth Blackburn	Australia	Researcher at molecular Biological Sciences at the University of California, member of the Institute of Medicine	the discovery of the nature and maintenance of chromosome ends and their roles in cancer and aging
2009	PMC	Africa and the Arab States	Tebello Nyokong	South Africa	Professor of Medical Chemistry and technology at Rhodes University, and a recipient of the Presidency of South Africa's Order of Mapungubwe in Bronze	work on harnessing light for cancer therapy and for environmental clean-up
2009	PMC	Asia and the Pacific	Akiko Kobayashi	Japan	Professor of chemistry emeritus at the University of Tokyo and Nihon University	contribution to the development of molecular conductors and the design and synthesis of a single-component molecular metal
2009	PMC	Europe	Athene M. Donald	United Kingdom	Professor of Experimental Physics at the University of Cambridge and Master of Churchill College, Cambridge	work in unraveling the mysteries of the physics of messy materials, ranging from cement to starch
2009	PMC	Latin America and the Caribbean	Beatriz Barbuy	Brazil	Professor of astrophysics at the Instituto de Astronomia, Geofísica Ciências Atmosféricas (IAG) at the University of São Paulo, vice-president of the International Astronomical Union	work on the life of stars from the birth of the Universe to the present time
2009	PMC	North America	Eugenia Kumacheva	Canada	Professor of Chemistry at the University of Toronto and a Canada Research Chair in Advanced Functional Materials	the design and development of new materials with many applications including targeted drug delivery for cancer treatments and materials for high density optical data storage
2010	LS	Africa and the Arab States	Rashika El Ridi	Egypt	Professor of Immunology, Department of Zoology Faculty of Science, Cairo University	paving the way towards the development of a vaccine against the tropical disease schistosomiasis
2010	LS	Asia and the Pacific	Lourdes J. Cruz	Philippines	Professor of Immunology, at the University of Philippines Marine Science Institute, Founder of the rural Livehood Incubator in Bataan	the discovery of marine snail toxins that can serve as powerful tools to study brain function
2010	LS	Europe	Anne Dejean-Assémat	France	Research Director at INSERM and Professor at the Pasteur Institute, head of the Laboratory of Nuclear Organization and Oncogenesis at the Pasteur Institute and the INSERM Unit 993 Molecular and Cellular Biological Sciences of Tumors	contributions to our understanding of leukaemia and liver cancers
2010	LS	Latin America and the Caribbean	Alejandra Bravo	Mexico	Researcher at the Institute of Molecular MicroBiological Sciences of the National Autonomous University of Mexico (UNAM)	work on a bacterial toxin that acts as a powerful insecticide
2010	LS	North America	Elaine Fuchs	United States	Investigator at the Howard Hughes Medical Institute and the Rebecca C. Lancefield Professor of Mammalian Cell Biological Sciences and Development at The Rockefeller University	contributions to our knowledge of skin biology and skin stem cells
2011	PMC	Africa and the Arab States	Faiza Al-Harafi	Kuwait	Professor of chemistry at Kuwait University, member of the Board of Director of Kuwait University	work on corrosion, a problem of fundamental importance to water treatment and the oil industry; notable contributions to electrochemistry with particular emphasis on corrosion and catalysis
2011	PMC	Asia and the Pacific	Vivian Wing-Wah Yam	Hong Kong	Professor in chemistry and Energy at the University of Hong Kong	work on light-emitting materials and innovative ways of capturing solar energy; pioneering contributions in the molecular design of photo-active materials that are particularly relevant to solar energy conversion
2011	PMC	Europe	Anne L'Huillier	France	Professor of atomic physic at Lund University in Sweden	work on the development of the fastest camera for recording the movement of electrons in attoseconds (a billionth of a billionth of a second); pioneering experimental and theoretical contributions to harmonic light generation as a base technology for attosecond science
2011	PMC	Latin America and the Caribbean	Silvia Torres-Peimbert	Mexico	President of the International Astronomical Union and member of the American Astronomical Society and the Academy of Sciences of the Developing World, Mexico	work on the chemical composition of nebulae which is fundamental to our understanding of the origin of the universe; fundamental contribution to the studies of nebulae that have led to a better understanding of the chemical evolution of galaxies and the universe
2011	PMC	North America	Jillian Banfield	Australia	Professor at the University of California, Berkeley with appointments in the Earth Science, Ecosystem Science and Materials Science and Engineering departments	work on bacterial and material behavior under extreme conditions relevant to the environment and the Earth; for pioneering achievements in environmental science integrating chemical, biological, mineralogical, and proteogenomic influences
2012	LS	Africa and the Arab States	Jill Farrant	South Africa	Professor of Molecular and Cell Biological Sciences at the University of Cape Town	the elucidation of mechanisms by which plants overcome drought conditions
2012	LS	Asia and the Pacific	Ingrid Scheffer	Australia	Paediatric neurologist and senior research fellow at the Florey Institute of Neuroscience and Mental Health Sciences	identifying genes involved in some forms of epilepsy
2012	LS	Europe	Frances Ashcroft	United Kingdom	Royal Society GlaxoSmithKline Research Professor at the University Laboratory of Physiology at the University of Oxford	discovery of an ATP-sensitive potassium channel linking glucose metabolism and insulin secretion and its role in neonatal diabetes
2012	LS	Latin America and the Caribbean	Susana López Charretón	Mexico	Professor of virology at the Institute of Biotechnology at the National Autonomous University of Mexico	elucidating the mechanisms of rotavirus infections
2012	LS	North America	Bonnie Bassler	United States	Professor in Molecular Biological Sciences and chair of the Department of Molecular Biological Sciences at Princeton University	discovering the chemical signals and mechanisms bacteria use to communicate and coordinate group behaviors
2013	PMC	Africa and the Arab States	Francisca Nneka Okeke	Nigeria	Professor of Physics at the University of Nigeria	significant contributions to the understanding of daily variations of the ion currents in the upper atmosphere which may further our understanding of climate change
2013	PMC	Asia and the Pacific	Reiko Kuroda	Japan	Foreign member of the Royal Swedish Academy of Sciences in its class for chemistry, Professor at the Department of Life Sciences at the University of Tokyo	discovering the functional importance of the difference between left handed and right handed molecules which has wide applications including research on neurodegenerative diseases such as Alzheimer's
2013	PMC	Europe	Pratibha Gai	United Kingdom	Microscopist and Professor and Chair of Electron Microscopy and former Director at The York JEOL Nanocentre, Departments of Chemistry and Physics, University of York	ingeniously modifying her electron microscope so that she was able to observe chemical reactions occurring at surface atoms of catalysts which will help scientists in their development of new medicines or new energy sources
2013	PMC	Latin America and the Caribbean	Marcia Barbosa	Brazil	Freelance Biogeography consulting and training at Portugal	discovering one of the peculiarities of water which may lead to better understanding of how earthquakes occur and how proteins fold which is important for the treatment of diseases
2013	PMC	North America	Deborah S. Jin	United States		having been the first to cool down molecules so much that she can observe chemical reactions in slow motion which may help further understanding of molecular processes which are important for medicine or new energy sources
2014	LS	Africa and the Arab States	Segenet Kelemu	Ethiopia	Director General of the International Centre of Insect Physiology and Ecology, Director of Biosciences eastern and central Africa (BecA); Vice President of Programs at the Alliance for a Green Revolution in Africa (AGRA), and Leader of Crop	research on how microorganisms living in symbiosis with forage grasses can improve their capacity to resist disease and adapt to environmental and climate change
2014	LS	Asia and the Pacific	Kayo Inaba	Japan	Director, Kyoto University Gender Equality Promotion Center / Executive Vice-President for Gender Equality, International Affairs, and Public Relations, Kyoto University/ Guest Investigator	critical discoveries concerning the mechanisms triggered by the immune system when it is faced with a threat such as a virus or bacteria or by abnormal cells such as cancer cells
2014	LS	Europe	Brigitte Kieffer	France	Professor at Strasbourg University, Director of INSERM at Strasbourg and Institut Douglas at Montreal	decisive work on the brain mechanisms involved in pain, mental illness and drug addiction
2014	LS	Latin America and the Caribbean	Cecilia Bouzat	Argentina	Principal Investigator of the CONICET and Deputy Director of the Institute of Biochemical Research of White Bay (INIBIBB)	contribution to our understanding of how brain cells communicate among themselves and with muscles
2014	LS	North America	Laurie Glimcher	United States	President and CEO of Dana-Farber Cancer Institute, Member of the American Philosophical Society	discovering key factors involved in controlling immune response (T-bet) in allergies and in autoimmune, infectious and malignant diseases
2015	PMC	Africa and the Arab States	Rajaâ Cherkaoui El Moursli	Morocco	Professor of nuclear physics at Mohammed V's Rabat University	key contribution to one of the greatest discoveries in physics: proof of the existence of the Higgs Boson, the particle responsible for the creation of mass in the universe
2015	PMC	Asia and the Pacific	Xie Yi	China	Chemist, member of the Chinese Academy of Sciences and a fellow of the Royal Society of Chemistry, professor and doctoral supervisor at University of Science and Technology of China	significant contributions to inorganic solid state solvothermal chemistry at the nanoscale, particularly unconventional semi-conductor materials and graphene-like structures a few atoms thick
2015	PMC	Europe	Carol Robinson	United Kingdom	Chemist and President of the Royal Society of Chemistry, Royal Society Researcher Professor at the Physical and Theoretical Chemistry Laboratory at the University of Oxford	groundbreaking work in macromolecular mass spectrometry and pioneering gas phase structural biology by probing the structure and reactivity of single proteins and protein complexes, including membrane proteins
2015	PMC	Europe	Molly S. Shoichet	Canada	Professor, Chemistry and biomedical engineering at Toronto University Head of the research program Shoichetlab specialized to the regenerative medecine	pioneering work on advanced laser photochemistry for creating 3D patterns in hydrogels that enable regeneration of nerve tissue
2015	PMC	Latin America and the Caribbean	Thaisa Storchi Bergmann	Brazil	President of Cross-Division D-J Commission Supermassive Black Holes, Feedback and Galaxy Evolution at UFGRS / Head of Research Group Department of Astronomy - IF-UFRGS	outstanding work on super-massive black holes in the centers of galaxies and their associated regions of dense gas, dust, and young stars surrounding them, as well as their role in the evolution of galaxies
2016	LS	Africa and the Arab States	Quarraisha Abdool Karim	South Africa	Associate Scientific Director of the AIDS research center, CAPRISA, Professor in Clinical Epidemiology at the Columbia University, honorary professor in Public Health Sciences at the University of KwaZulu-Natal	remarkable contribution to the prevention and treatment of HIV and associated infections, greatly improving the quality of life of women in Africa
2016	LS	Asia and the Pacific	Chen Hualan	China	Member of the World Organisation for Animal Health Sciences (OIE), member of the Food and Agriculture Organization Corporate Statistical Database (FAOSTAT), Researcher and PhD Supervisor at Harbin Veterinary Research Institute of Chinese Academy	outstanding research into the biology of the bird flu virus, leading to the development and use of an effective vaccine
2016	LS	Europe	Emmanuelle Charpentier	France	Professor and researcher in microbiological Sciences, Genetics and Biochemistry, Director of the Max Planck Institute for Infection Biological Sciences, Berlin	game-changing discovery, alongside Professor Jennifer Doudna, of a versatile DNA editing technique to “rewrite” flawed genes in people and other living organisms, opening tremendous new possibilities for treating, even curing, diseases
2016	LS	Latin America and the Caribbean	Andrea Gamarnik	Argentina	Professor, Molecular Virology Laboratory, Fundación Instituto Leloir, CONICET, Buenos Aires	seminal discoveries on how mosquito-borne viruses reproduce and cause human diseases, particularly Dengue Fever.
2016	LS	North America	Jennifer Doudna	United States	Li Ka Shing Chancellor Chair Professor, Department of Chemistry and Department of Molecular and Cell Biological Sciences, University of California, Berkeley	game-changing discovery, alongside Professor Emmanuelle Charpentier, of a versatile DNA editing technique to “rewrite” flawed genes in people and other living organisms, opening tremendous new possibilities for treating, even curing, diseases
2017	PMC	Africa and the Arab States	Niveen Khashab	Lebanon	Associate Professor of Chemical Sciences and Engineering, King Abdullah University of Science and Technology (KAUST)	contributions to innovative smart hybrid materials aimed at drug delivery and for developing new techniques to monitor intracellular antioxidant activity
2017	PMC	Asia and the Pacific	Michelle Simmons	AustraliaUnited Kingdom	Professor and Director of the Center of Excellence for Quantum Computation and Communication Technology, University of New South Wales	pioneering contributions to quantum and atomic electronics, constructing atomic transistors en route to quantum computers
2017	PMC	Europe	Nicola Spaldin	United Kingdom	Professor and Chair of Materials Theory, ETH Zürich	groundbreaking multidisciplinary work predicting, describing and creating new materials that have switchable magnetic and ferroelectric properties
2017	PMC	Latin America and the Caribbean	María Teresa Ruiz	Chile	Professor, Department of Astronomy, Universidad of Chile	discovery of the first brown dwarf and her seminal work on understanding the faintest stars, including stars at the final stages of their evolution (white dwarfs)
2017	PMC	North America	Zhenan Bao	China	Professor of Chemical Engineering and Material Science and Engineering, Stanford University	outstanding contribution to and mastery of the development of novel functional polymers for consumer electronics, energy storage and biomedical applications
2018	LS	Africa and the Arab States	Heather Zar	South Africa	Professor and Chair, Department of Paediatrics & Child Health Sciences, Red Cross War Memorial Children’s Hospital, Director SAMRC Unit, University of Cape Town	establishing a cutting-edge research programme in pneumonia, tuberculosis and asthma, saving the lives of many children worldwide
2018	LS	Asia and the Pacific	Meemann Chang	China	Professor, Institute of Vertebrate Palaeontology and Palaeoanthropology Member of Chinese Academy of Sciences	pioneering work on fossil records leading to insights on how aquatic vertebrates adapted to life on land
2018	LS	Europe	Caroline Dean	United Kingdom	Professor, John Innes Centre, Norwich Research Park	groundbreaking research on how plants adapt to their surroundings and climate change, leading to new ways for crop improvement
2018	LS	Latin America and the Caribbean	Amy T. Austin	Argentina	Professor, IFEVA-CONICET, Faculty of Agronomy, University of Buenos Aires	remarkable contributions to understanding terrestrial ecosystem ecology in natural and human-modified landscapes
2018	LS	North America	Janet Rossant	United Kingdom	Senior Scientist, The Hospital for Sick Children, Toronto, Canada Professor, University of Toronto, Canada, President, Gairdner Foundation, Director, Ontario Institute for Regenerative Medicine	outstanding research that helped us to better understand how tissues and organs are formed in the developing embryo
2019	PMC	Africa and the Arab States	Najat A. Saliba	Lebanon	Professor of Chemistry and Director of the Nature Conservation Center at the American University of Beirut	pioneering work in identifying carcinogenic agents and other toxic air pollutants in the Middle East
2019	PMC	Asia and the Pacific	Maki Kawai	Japan	Director General, Institute for Molecular Science, University of Tokyo, Japan, member of the Science Council of Japan, President of the Chemical Society of Japan	ground-breaking work in manipulating molecules at the atomic level, in order to transform materials and create innovative material
2019	PMC	Europe	Claire Voisin	France	Director at CNRS, Institute of Mathematics of Jussieu - Professor, Chair of Algebraic Geometry at the Collège de France	outstanding work in algebraic geometry
2019	PMC	Latin America and the Caribbean	Karen Hallberg	Argentina	Professor of Physics at the Balseiro Institute and Research Director at the Bariloche Atomic Centre, CNEA/CONICET	developing cutting-edge computational approaches that allow scientists to understand the physics of quantum matter
2019	PMC	North America	Ingrid Daubechies	Belgium	Professor of Mathematics and Electrical and Computer Engineering, Duke University	exceptional contribution to the numerical treatment of images and signal processing, providing standard and flexible algorithms for data compression
2020	LS	Africa and the Arab States	Abla Mehio Sibai	Lebanon	Professor of Epidemiology and Public Health Sciences, American University of Beirut	pioneering research and advocacy to improve healthy ageing in low- and middle-income countries and their impact on health and social policy programmes
2020	LS	Asia and the Pacific	Firdausi Qadri	Bangladesh	Senior Director, Infectious Diseases Division, International Center for Diarrhoeal Disease and Research, Dhaka	outstanding work to understand and prevent infectious diseases affecting children in developing countries, and promote early diagnosis and vaccination with global health impact
2020	LS	Europe	Edith Heard	United Kingdom	Director General of the European Molecular Biological Sciences Laboratory, Professor and Chair of Epigenetics and Cellular Memory at the Collège de France	fundamental discoveries concerning the mechanisms governing epigenetic processes, which allow mammals to regulate proper gene expression and are essential for life
2020	LS	Latin America and the Caribbean	Esperanza Martínez-Romero	Mexico	Professor of Environmental Science, Genomic Science at the Center of the National Autonomous University of Mexico	pioneering work on the use of environmentally friendly bacteria to support plant growth for increased agricultural productivity and reduced use of chemical fertilizers
2020	LS	North America	Kristi Anseth	United States	Distinguished Professor, Tisone Professor, Associate Professor of Surgery, University of Colorado, Boulder	outstanding contribution in converging engineering and biology to develop innovative biomaterials that help tissue regeneration and drug delivery
2021	PMC	Africa and the Arab States	Catherine Ngila	South Africa	Acting Executive Director of the African Academy of Sciences, Former Deputy Vice Chancellor in charge of Academic and Student Affairs (DVC-AA) at Riara University, Kenya, and Visiting Professor of Applied Chemistry at the University of Johannesburg, South Africa:	introducing, developing and applying nanotechnology-based analytical methods to monitor water pollutants. Her innovative work is of vital importance for the development of water resource management in an environmentally sustainable way
2021	PMC	Asia and the Pacific	Kyoko Nozaki	Japan	Professor of Chemistry at the University of Tokyo, Japan	pioneering, creative contributions within the field of synthetic chemistry, and their importance to industrial innovation. Her research has led to new, highly effective and environmentally friendly production processes to manufacture molecules useful for medicine and sustainable agriculture
2021	PMC	Europe	Françoise Combes	United States	Professor and Galaxies and Cosmology Chair at the Collège de France in Paris, and Astrophysicist at the Paris Observatory - PSL, France:	outstanding contribution to astrophysics which ranges from the discovery of molecules in interstellar space to supercomputer simulations of galaxy formation. Her work has been crucial to our understanding of the birth and evolution of stars and galaxies, including the role played by supermassive black holes in galactic centers
2021	PMC	Latin America and the Caribbean	Alicia Dickenstein	Argentina	Professor of Mathematics at the University of Buenos Aires, Argentina	outstanding contributions at the forefront of mathematical innovation by leveraging algebraic geometry in the field of molecular biology. Her research enables scientists to understand the structures and behaviour of cells and molecules, even on a microscopic scale. Operating at the frontier between pure and applied mathematics, she has forged important links to physics and chemistry, and enabled biologists to gain an in-depth structural understanding of biochemical reactions and enzymatic networks
2021	PMC	North America	Shafi Goldwasser	Israel United States	Director of the Simons Institute for the Theory of Computing, Professor in Electrical Engineering and Computer Sciences at University of California Berkeley, RSA Professor of Electrical Engineering and Computer Science at MIT, United States of America and Professor of Computer Science and Applied Mathematics at Weizmann Institute, Israel :	pioneering and fundamental work in computer science and cryptography, essential for secure communication over the internet as well as for shared computation on private data. Her research has a significant impact on our understanding of large classes of problems for which computers cannot efficiently find even approximate solutions
2022	LS	Africa and the Arab States	Agnès Binagwaho	Rwanda	Professor of Pediatrics and Vice-Chancellor of Global Health Equity University, Kigali, Rwanda	central role in expanding access to public healthcare for the most vulnerable communities in Rwanda, Africa and beyond, helping reduce the global burden of disease and improving lives. In particular, she focuses on best practices in building resilient health systems and improving the quality, availability, and affordability of healthcare services for people suffering with diseases including HIV, malaria, and tuberculosis. This has never been more important than now as overwhelmed healthcare systems across the world struggle to build back stronger in the wake of the Covid-19 pandemic.
2022	LS	Asia and the Pacific	Hailan Hu	China	Professor and Executive Director of the Neuroscience Center of Zhejiang University School of Medicine, China	major discoveries in social and emotional neuroscience. Her ground-breaking work has revolutionized scientific understanding of mental health and, deciphered the mechanism of depression to inform innovative treatment strategies and new medicines. These breakthroughs are vital in the wake of the mental health crisis sparked by the Covid-19 pandemic, with nearly 30% of the global population suffering from depression according to Lancet. She is passionate about raising awareness and illuminating pathways to high impact solutions, particularly given that in many parts of the world, the illness remains largely under diagnosed and still taboo.
2022	LS	Europe	María Ángela Nieto	Spain	Professor at the Institute of Neuroscience (CSIC-UMH)	fundamental discoveries in embryonic development, which have paved the way for understanding how cancer extends to other organs and forms metastases, the secondary tumours that cause more than 90% of cancer-related deaths. In particular, she explores how cells change identity in the embryo to disseminate and form different tissues. This in turn stands to illuminate how cancer spreads and inform better therapeutic strategies.
2022	LS	Latin America and the Caribbean	Maria Guadalupe Guzmán	Cuba	Infectious disease and virology, Director of the Research Center of the Pedro Kouri Institute (IPK), Institute of Tropical Medicine	pioneering work to address the devastating human infections caused by the dengue virus, one of the world's most serious diseases in terms of morbidity and mortality, causing 390 million dengue virus infections annually¹. Her research has led to a better understanding of its pathogenesis and risk factors, the origin of several epidemics of dengue haemorrhagic fever, the development of diagnosis and monitoring, and the search for potential new vaccines. It will also strengthen training for medical students and personnel, helping to ensure the next generations are better equipped to fight these viruses.
2022	LS	North America	Katalin Karikó	Hungary United States	Adjunct Professor at the Perelman School of Medicine, University of Pennsylvania, United States of America, and Senior Vice President at BioNTech RNA Pharmaceuticals, Philadelphia, United States of America	ground-breaking development of a non-inflammatory mRNA, as a potent vaccine to prevent viral and parasitic infections. Her research has contributed to the development of the COVID-19 vaccines by Pfizer-BioNTech and Moderna. She has been conducting years of research which led to a solution for one of the basic problems of RNA, namely the low and short-lived protein production. Professor Karikó discovered that nucleoside-modified mRNA – compared to unmodified and non-optimized mRNA – had a better tolerability and could be administered at higher doses. Her research has paved the way for future therapies in complex diseases such as cancer, heart failure, stroke, anaemia, and autoimmune diseases.
2023	PMC	Africa and the Arab States	Suzana Nunes	Brazil	Professor of Chemical and Environmental Science and Engineering, Vice Provost for Faculty and Academic Affairs, King Abdullah University of Science and Technology (KAUST), Saudi Arabia	outstanding work in developing innovative membrane filters to achieve highly efficient chemical separations with a lower carbon footprint. Her research has proven to be particularly beneficial to the water, petrochemical and pharmaceutical industries in achieving a more sustainable environment
2023	PMC	Asia and the Pacific	Lidia Morawska	AustraliaPoland	Distinguished Professor, School of Earth Sciences and Climate, Queensland University of Technology, Australia and Director of the International Laboratory for air quality and health	excellent research in the field of air pollution and its impact on human health and the environment, with a specific focus on atmospheric particulate matter. Her extraordinary dedication and impact have built a bridge from fundamental science to real-world policy and practice to provide clean air for all
2023	PMC	Europe	Frances Kirwan	United Kingdom	Savilian Professor of Geometry, University of Oxford	exceptional work in pure mathematics combining geometry and algebra in order to develop techniques to understand the classification of geometric objects. These techniques have been used by theoretical physicists searching for mathematical descriptions of our universe. Her recent work has the potential to help scientists to extract crucial information from large complex data sets
2023	PMC	Latin America and the Caribbean	Anamaría Font	Venezuela	Professor of Physics, Central University of Venezuela	important contributions in theoretical particle physics, in particular to the study of String Theory. Her research has furthered the theory's implications for the structure of matter and quantum gravity, which is also relevant to the description of black holes and the first instants after the big bang
2023	PMC	North America	Aviv Regev	Israel	Executive Vice President and Global Head of Genentech Research and Early Development, Genentech/Roche, San Francisco	pioneering work applying mathematics and computer science to revolutionize cell biology. Her research enables scientists to discover and characterize the trillions of cells within the body and enhances scientists’ ability to decipher and target the mechanisms that cause disease, in order to develop better diagnostics and therapies
2024	LES	Africa and the Arab States	Rose Leke	Cameroon	Former Head of the Department of Infectious Diseases and Immunology, Faculty of Medicine and Biomedical Sciences, and Former Director of the Biotechnology Centre, University of Yaoundé I, Cameroon	dedicated leadership, outstanding research and pioneering efforts to improve outcomes in pregnancy-associated malaria, support the eradication of polio and improve immunization in Africa, as well as for her efforts to improve the career path of young scientists. Dr Leke’s national, regional, and global influence has had a profound impact on public health in her native Cameroon and across Africa. Her achievements position her as a role model, leading educator and advocate for young female scientists.
2024	LES	Asia and the Pacific	Nieng Yan	China	University Professor, School of Life Sciences, Tsinghua University; Founding President of Shenzhen Medical Academy of Research and Translation; Director of Shenzhen Bay Laboratory, China	for discovering the atomic structure of multiple membrane proteins that mediate the traffic of ions and sugars across the cell membrane, revealing principles that govern cross-membrane transport. Her exceptional research has informed multiple disorders such as epilepsy and arrhythmia and guided the treatment of pain syndrome. As a leading authority in her field, Dr Yan inspires female scientists globally and is a strong advocate for gender equality in research and science education.
2024	LES	Europe	Geneviève Almouzni	France	Director of Research from The National Centre for Scientific Research (CNRS) at the Curie Institute, France	seminal contributions to understanding how DNA is packaged with proteins inside the cell nucleus. Her pioneering work in epigenetics has furthered our understanding of how cell identity is determined during normal development and disrupted by cancer. Her extraordinary successes in advancing research, training the next generation of scientists and promoting women in science are inspirational
2024	LES	Latin America and the Caribbean	Alicia Kowaltowski	Brazil	Professor of Biochemistry, University of São Paulo, Brazil	fundamental contribution to the biology of mitochondria, which are "the cell’s main energy source, acting as their batteries". Her work has been critical for our understanding of the implication of energy metabolism in chronic diseases, including obesity and diabetes, as well as in ageing. Her outstanding contribution as an investigator and mentor, as well as her advocacy for science in Latin America and its dissemination to the public, are an inspiration for young scientists.
2024	LES	North America	Nada Jabado	Canada Lebanon France	Professor, Departments of Pediatrics and Human Genetics, Canada Research Chair Tier 1 in Pediatric Oncology, McGill University, Canada	revolutionizing our comprehension of the genetic defects responsible for aggressive pediatric brain tumours. Her seminal discovery of the first-ever histone mutations in human disease, referred to as oncohistones, has sparked a fundamental change in the cancer research sphere. Through her innovative research and effective leadership in establishing a global collaborative network, she has reshaped the medical approach to pediatric cancer, advancing both diagnostic capabilities and clinical treatments for young patients
2025	PMC	Africa and the Arab States	Priscilla Baker	South Africa	Professor of Chemistry, University of the Western Cape, Cape Town, South Africa	for her outstanding contribution in the field of highly sensitive electrochemical microsensors for detecting contaminants in the environment, with applications in pharmaceuticals, food, health and energy.
2025	PMC	Asia and the Pacific	Wang Xiaoyun	China	Chen-Ning Yang Professorship, Institute for Advanced Study, Tsinghua University, Beijing, China	Rewarded for her significant contribution to cryptography and cryptographic mathematics, critical for secure data communication and storage. Her breakthrough work showed essential flaws on hash functions, which are widely used in communication protocols and led to the invention of the new hash function standards. Today, these standards are used for bank cards, computer passwords, and e-commerce.
2025	PMC	Europe	Claudia Felser	Germany	Director and Scientific Member, Max Planck Institute for Chemical Physics of Solids, Dresden, Germany	for her pioneering work at the crossroads of physics, mathematics and chemistry that led to the discovery and creation of new magnetic materials with great promise for future green energy technologies. Her visionary approach has paved the way for the new field of “topological quantum chemistry” and sparked a revolution in the field of relativistic matter. Her outstanding dedication and impact have built a bridge from fundamental science to real-world challenges in data storage and green energy technologies.
2025	PMC	Latin America and the Caribbean	María Teresa Dova	Argentina	Professor at Physics Department, Faculty of Exact Sciences, National University of La Plata, and Senior Researcher at National Scientific and Technical Research Council (CONICET), La Plata, Argentina	for her key contributions to high energy physics including the discovery and characterization of the Higgs boson, the search for new physics and her remarkable work in the study of cosmic ray physics.
2025	PMC	North America	Barbara J. Finlayson-Pitts	Canada United States	Distinguished Professor Emerita, Chemistry Department and Founder/Co-Director, Atmospheric Integrated Research Institute, University of California, Irvine, United States of America	for her groundbreaking research revealing new processes in the formation of air pollution as photochemical smog, she established the molecular basis of reactions at the interfaces between atmosphere and airborne particles. Her unique ability to translate fundamental findings into real-life applications have led to seminal contributions to public policy and regulations on atmospheric chemistry, ultimately improving air quality.
2026	LES	Africa and the Arab States	Liesl Zühlke	South Africa	Professor at the University of Cape Town, Vice President of the South African Medical Research Council, South Africa	for improving care for children with heart conditions especially rheumatic heart disease (RHD) that disproportionately affects children living in poverty.
2026	LES	Asia and the Pacific	Felice Jacka	Australia	Deakin Distinguished Professor, OAM, and Director of the Food & Mood Centre at Deakin University	for establishing the field of nutritional psychiatry.
2026	LES	Europe	Sarah Teichmann	Germany	FMedSci FRS, Chair in Stem Cell Medicine at the University of Cambridge	for her outstanding interdisciplinary research using genome science and computational biology to understand the human body at single cell resolution.
2026	LES	Latin America and the Caribbean	Rachel Lía Chan	Argentina	Superior Researcher at CONICET; Professor at the National University of Litoral (UNL); Director of the Litoral Agrobiotechnology Institute (CONICET-UNL)	for transforming fundamental plant biology into agricultural innovation through her discovery of genes and biological mechanisms that enhance plant tolerance to changing environments
2026	LES	North America	Gordana Vunjak-Novakovic	United States Serbia	University Professor, Mikati Foundation Professor of Biomedical Engineering at Columbia University.	for her pioneering work in human tissue engineering and regenerative medicine

=== Special tributes ===
On the 25th anniversary of the award (2023), a special tribute was given to three researchers in exile, who were or had been forced to interrupt their scientific career in their home country and have pursued their career abroad. A financial reward and a medal of honor was awarded to Mursal Dawodi (artificial intelligence) from Afghanistan, Ann Al Sawoor (mathematics) from Iraq, and Marycelin Baba (molecular biology) from Nigeria.

== International Rising Talents ==
From 2000 to 2014, fellowships were awarded yearly to doctoral and post-doctoral women to allow them to pursue their research in host laboratories outside their home countries.

Established in 2015, the International Rising Talent Grants are awarded annually to 15 PhD students and post-doctoral Fellows. They replace the former International Fellowships.

=== Laureates ===
- List of L'Oréal-UNESCO For Women in Science International Rising Talents laureates

== Regional programmes ==
"Women in Science" has national and regional awards.

- L’Oréal Korea-UNESCO for Women in Science Award
- Taiwan Outstanding Women in Science
- L'Oréal-UNESCO For Women in Science Australia & New Zealand Fellowships

== See also ==
- Women in science
  - Women in chemistry
  - Women in medicine
  - Women in physics
- List of science and technology awards for women
- List of general science and technology awards
