= Ana López =

Ana López may refer to:

- Ana López (Cuban sprinter) (born 1982)
- Ana María López Calleja (born 1968), Spanish Paralympic athlete and cyclist
- Ana Gabriela López (born 1994), Mexican weightlifter
- Ana Paola López (born 1994), Mexican footballer
- Ana María López Colomé, Mexican biochemist
- Ana López-Puigcerver, Spanish make-up artist
