= Victoria Calzada =

Uruguayan biochemist (born 1985)

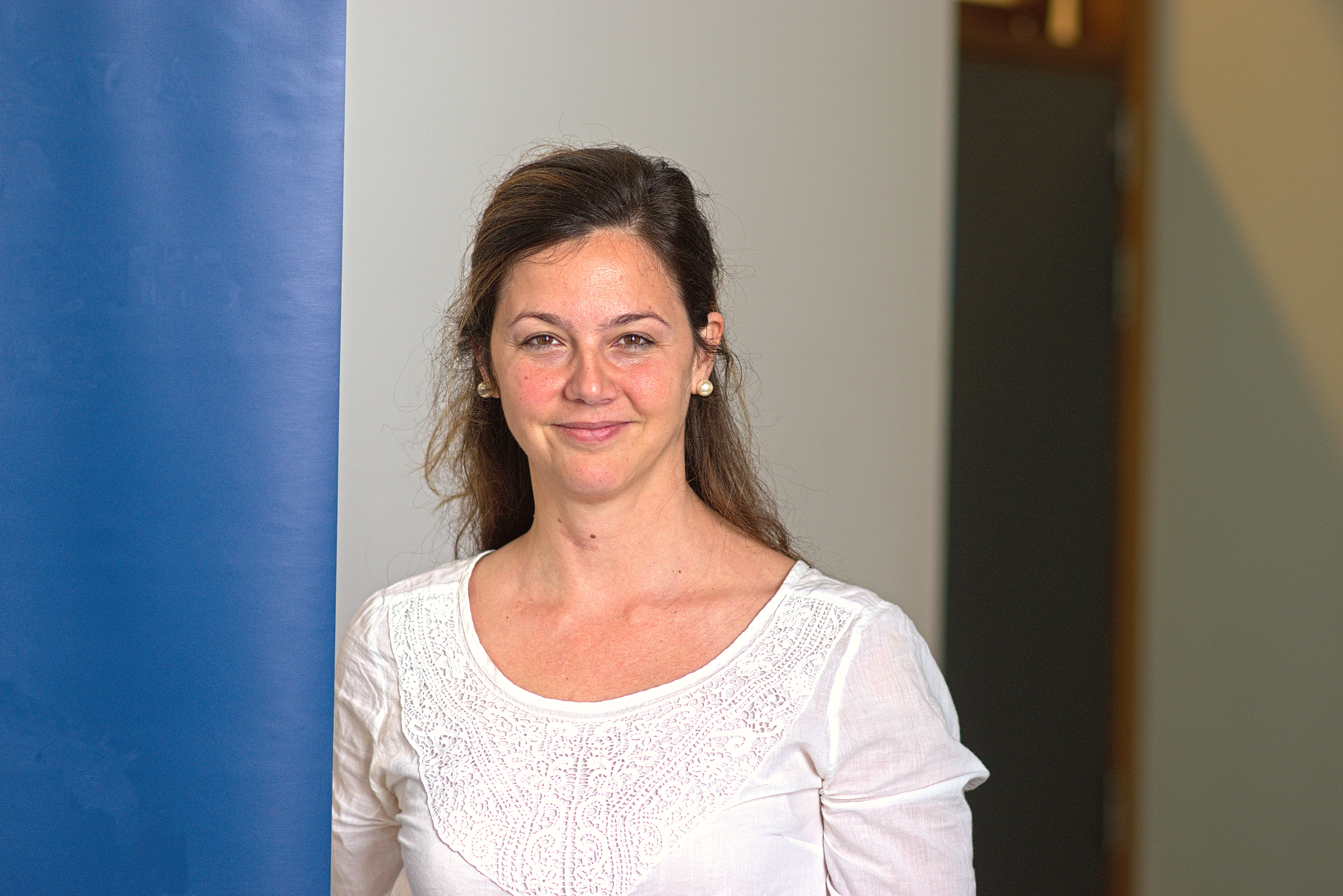
- Victoria Calzada in 2023.
- Born: Victoria Calzada Falcón; July 1985 (age 41); Montevideo, Uruguay
- Occupations: Biochemist, professor, researcher, scientist
- Employer: University of the Republic
- Awards: L'Oréal UNESCO Awards for Women in Science

Academic background
- Education: University of the Republic

Victoria Calzada Falcón (Montevideo, 1985), is a Uruguayan biochemist, professor, researcher and scientist. In 2020, Calzada was awarded the L'Oréal UNESCO Awards for Women in Science for her country.

== Career ==
Calzada studied Biochemistry at the Faculty of Sciences of the University of the Republic in Uruguay. She completed her doctorate in Chemistry at the same institution in 2015. She is Assistant Professor in the Department of Radiopharmacy at Udelar’s Center for Nuclear Research since 2015. She is coordinator of the Ibero‑American Aptamer Network (REDIBA) and a member of the International Society on Aptamers (INSOAP). She is a specialist in the area of aptamers and molecular imaging, and since 2012 she is a member of the National System of Researchers of Uruguay.

In 2020, Calzada was awarded the L'Oréal UNESCO Awards for Women in Science for her country.
