= List of Tunisian scientists =

This list represents a full overview about notable Tunisian scientists who had appeared since the creation of Tunisia as a distinct political entity under the Ottoman influence in the 16th century.

== Ottoman Period (1574–1881) ==
When the Ottoman empire had occupied Tunisia, the Scientific Deterioration of Tunisia has not been efficiently inhibited. The unique institution that had contributed to avoid a catastrophic situation for the common knowledge in Tunisia is the Zitouna University that had developed during successive Ottoman periods and that gives courses which are specialized in social sciences and humanities like theology, Fiqh, Hadith, Arabic language, Arabic literature, Law and a few Arithmetics and calculus. This situation explains why all important scientists of that period were lawyers, poets, authors and theologists.

During the crisis of the 19th century that had occurred in Tunisia 67, some notable intellectual people who had deeper training and education had appeared like General Hussein and Kheireddine Pacha thanks to their specialized studies in the Military school of Bardo that had been created to solve the matter of the lack of experts in applied sciences caused by the deficiency of the system of Zitouna University. Those people had tried to do some reforms to save the country. Even the alumni of Zitouna University had tried to do some works to better the scientific consciousness in Tunisia. In fact, some main scientific works of that period that were led by the Bayram, Ben Achour, Ennaifar and Djait families had been done. These works were important and were considered as promoters of an Arab Renaissance. However, these performances were not very fructuous as the French protectorate of Tunisia has been installed in April 1881.

=== Notable scientists ===
Forename and Surname	Discipline	Period of the apparition	Performances
Salem Bouhajeb	Arabic literature	1824–1924	

== Medicine and biology ==
- Habiba Bouhamed

== Social sciences ==
- Mohamed Talbi
