= Karimat El-Sayed =

Egyptian academic

Karimat El-Sayed (Arabic: كريمات السيد) is an Egyptian academic, crystallographer, and proponent of women's education. She is a professor of crystallography at Ain Shams University. She was president of the International Federation of Crystals, Education Division for three years.

== Biography ==
El-Sayed's father was an Arabic teacher; her brothers and sisters are doctors and scientists. Her father was open-minded about her educational ambitions but her mother worried about the family's reputation and tried to have her married off after she studied mathematics and physics at Ain Shams University. El-Sayed completed her PhD at University College London under Kathleen Lonsdale in 1965. Under Lonsdale's guidance she had been able to correlate the atomic vibration of materials with the observed expansion of that material due to an increase in temperature.

Karimat El-Sayed founded the women's section of the Physics Department at King Abdul-Aziz University (1975). She was president of the International Federation of Crystals, Education Division for three years, and is the president of the Egyptian Committee on Crystallography for the 2014 International Year of Crystallography.

== Views ==
El-Sayed has strong views about the role of women in science and cites figures that show that the majority of scientists working on materials, who create patents, are women. She lectures to younger women talking about her heroine Marie Curie and offering herself as an alternative role model.

== Awards ==
- 2003: L'Oréal-UNESCO Awards for Women in Science.

== Personal life ==
El-Sayed married Salah A. Tahoun a Soil scientist, professor at Zagazig University faculty of agriculture . They had three children. Her postdoctoral research studied small impurities in metals which was important as the discovery of transistors had shown how these small additions to a material could radically effect its properties.
