= Rashika El Ridi =

Egyptian professor

- رشيقة احمد فتحي الرضي
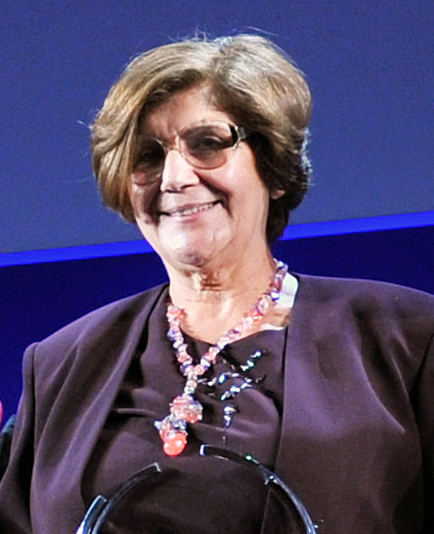
- Rashika El Ridi at the UNESCO building
- Born: Rashika Ahmed Fathi El Ridi
- Occupation: Professor

Rashika Ahmed Fathi El Ridi (Arabic: رشيقة احمد فتحي الرضي) is a professor of Immunology at the Department of Zoology Faculty of Science at Cairo University. Her speciality includes immunobiology and developing a vaccine for schistosomiasis.

== Career ==
Professor El Ridi received the Egyptian State Award of Merit in High Technology Sciences in 2010, the L'Oreal-UNESCO Award for Women in Science 2010, the Cairo University Award for Recognition in Applied Sciences in 2002, and the Egyptian State Award of Excellence in High Technology Sciences in 2002.

In October 2009, Professor Rashika El Ridi won the L'Oréal-UNESCO Awards for Women in Science for Africa and the Arab countries and was among the five most achieving women in the world. In their statement about Professor El Ridi, the voting committee for the prize said in a statement that the awarding of that recognition was given to professor El Ridi based on her contribution to the development of a vaccine to eradicate the cycle of schistosomiasis, a tropical disease infecting more than 200 million people in the world.

As of 2024, professor El Ridi has over 160 articles to her name, and her work has been cited more that 3900 times.
