= Alicia Kowaltowski =

Brazilian biochemist

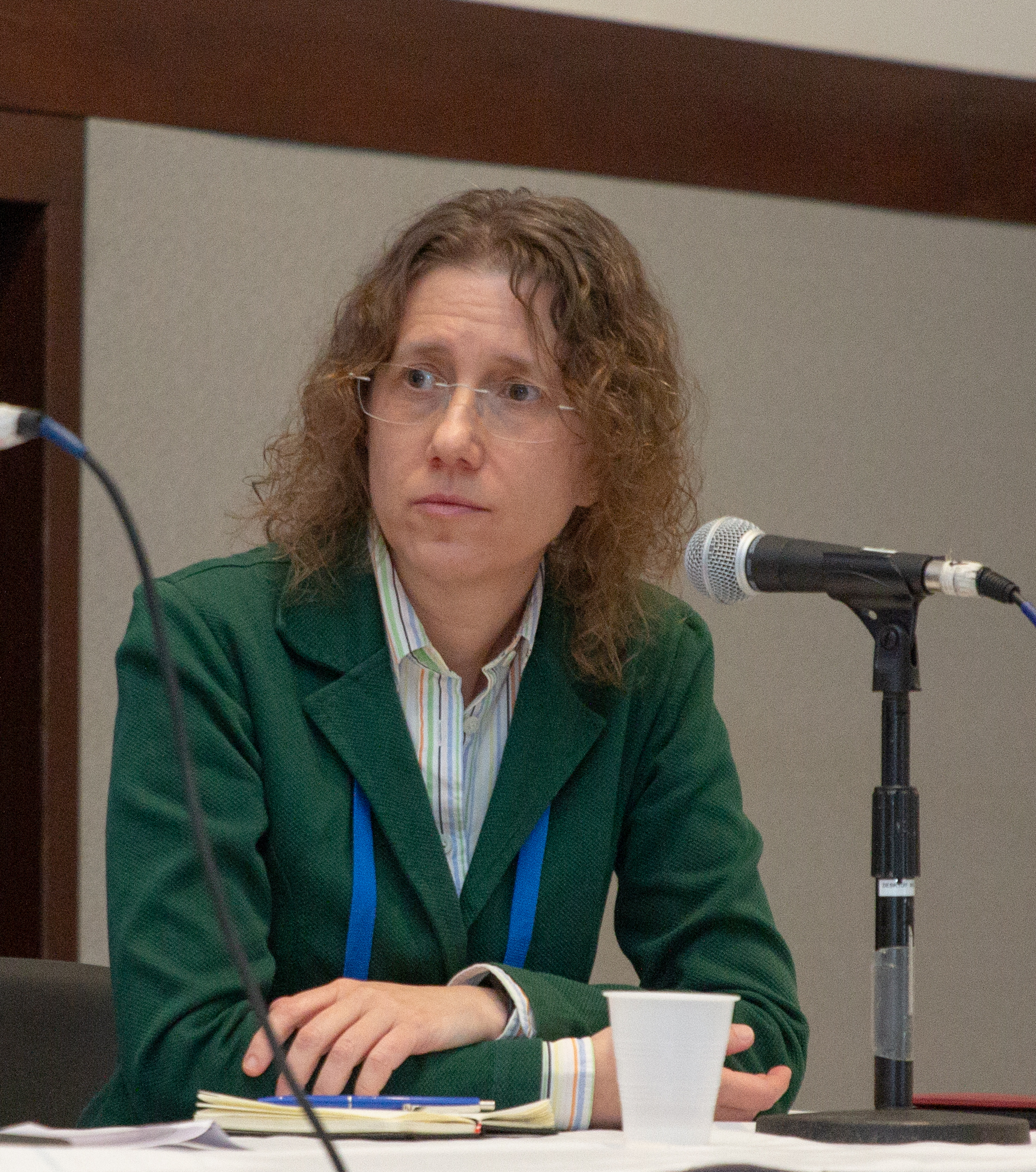
- Alicia Kowaltowski speaking on a science panel at AAAS 2025
- Born: Alicia Juliana Kowaltowski

Alicia Juliana Kowaltowski is a Brazilian biochemist. She is a member of the Brazilian Academy of Sciences and a professor at the University of São Paulo. She was awarded a Guggenheim Fellowship in 2006 and the L'Oréal-UNESCO For Women in Science Award in 2024.
