= Dominique Langevin =

French physicist (born 1947)

Dominique Langevin (French pronunciation: [dɔminik lɑ̃ʒvɛ̃]; born 24 July 1947) is a French researcher in physical chemistry. She is research director at the Centre national de la recherche scientifique and leads the liquid interface group in the Laboratory of Solid State Physics at the University of Paris-Sud. She was the Life and Physical Sciences Panel chair for the European Space Sciences Committee of the European Science Foundation from 2013-2021.

Langevin studies liquid interfaces and interfacial rheology, the flow of matter at interfaces between liquids, or between a liquid and a gas. She is particularly interested in foams and emulsions and has made significant contributions relating the mechanical properties of interfaces to the stability of foams and emulsions. She has had a major role in bringing together scientists and mathematicians from multiple disciplines to develop the field of foam and emulsion science. Her books include Light Scattering by Liquid Surfaces and Complementary Techniques (1992) and Emulsions, microemulsions and foams (2020).

== Early life ==
The daughter of Maurice Cruchon and Jacqueline Maujean, she was born Dominique Anne-Marie Cruchon in Angoulême. In 1969, she married the mathematician Michel Langevin.

== Education ==
She received a PhD from the women's École Normale Supérieure (ENS Sèvres) in Paris, and did a third-cycle thesis at the Laboratory of Hertzian Spectroscopy, supervised by Marie-Anne Bouchiat. Langevin conducted post-doctoral research at the Pierre Gilles de Gennes laboratory at the Collège de France.

== Career ==
During the 1970s, Langevin established the surfactant group at the École Normale Supérieure. During the early 1990s, she established the "Films de tensioactifs flexibles" research group. From 1994 to 1998, Langevin was director of the Centre de Recherche Paul Pascal in Bordeaux. She was president of the European Colloid and Interface Society from 1992 to 1993.

== Research ==
Her areas of research have included the experimental study of soft matter physics, including the surface of liquid crystals, mixtures of surfactants and polymers, the effects of nanoparticles on foams, foam drainage and soap film drainage, and the surface rheology of ultralow tension surfactant-oil-water systems.

Langevin has made significant contributions relating the mechanical properties of interfaces to the stability of foams and emulsions. Her work has broad application in industry and medicine, relating to preparation of foods and medicines, detergents, construction materials, fire-fighting, mineral extraction, recovery of pollutants, and nuclear waste treatment. She has also worked with the European Space Agency (ESA), leading an international team to study the behavior of foams in microgravity, in the FOAM-C (Foam and Optics Mechanics–Coarsening) experiment.

== Awards ==
Langevin has received awards including:

- 2012, Kasha Mittala (Kash Mittal Award) for Surfactant in Solution Science
- 2012, Overbeek Gold Medal, European Colloid and Interface Society (ECIS)
- 2009, European Ambassador for Creativity and Innovation, European Commission
- 2006, Légion d’honneur
- 2005, L'Oréal-UNESCO Award for Women in Science, "For her fundamental investigations of detergents, emulsions and foams".
- 2002, CNRS silver medal, Centre national de la recherche scientifique
- 2004, Gentler-Kastler Prize of the Société Française de Physique and the Deutsche Physikalische Gesellschaft
- 2001, Elected, Academy of Europe
- 1991, Grand prix de l’Académie des Sciences
