= Amy T. Austin =

Argentine ecologist

Amy Theresa Austin is an Argentine ecologist. She is a principal research scientist at the National Scientific and Technical Research Council in Argentina and a professor at the Faculty of Agronomy, University of Buenos Aires.

In 1988, she received a Bachelor of Arts in environmental science at Willamette University and a Doctor of Philosophy in biological sciences at Stanford University in 1997. In 2018, she was awarded the L'Oréal-UNESCO For Women in Science Awards “For her remarkable contributions to understanding terrestrial ecosystem ecology in natural and human-modified landscapes”. In 2023 she was granted the Konex Award Merit Diploma for her work in Ecology and Environmental Sciences in the last decade.
