= Mariana Weissmann =

Argentinian physicist, specialized in computational physics

Mariana Weissmann (born 17 December 1933) is an Argentinian physicist, specializing in the computational physics of condensed matter. In 2003, Weissmann became the first Argentinian scientist to receive the L'Oréal-UNESCO Award to Women in Science. The same year she received the Prize Konex in Physics.

== Work ==
Weissmann received her PhD in 1965 at the University of Buenos Aires and she did her postgraduate studies at the California Institute of Technology. She specialized in theoretical studies and numerical simulations of the properties of solid state.

Her works on computational physics of condensed matter in the formation of ice opened up the possibility of cloud seeding to change the amount or type of precipitation that falls from clouds. She also studied silicon surfaces and their interaction with atoms of carbon. This included recently discovered molecules like doped fullerenes doped.

She has directed numerous PhDs and published more than 100 scientific publications in international journals.

In 2003, she received the L'Oréal-UNESCO Awards for Women in Science in their category of Latin America, the first Argentine scientist to receive the award which was created in 1998.
