= Andrea Gamarnik =

Argentine molecular virologist

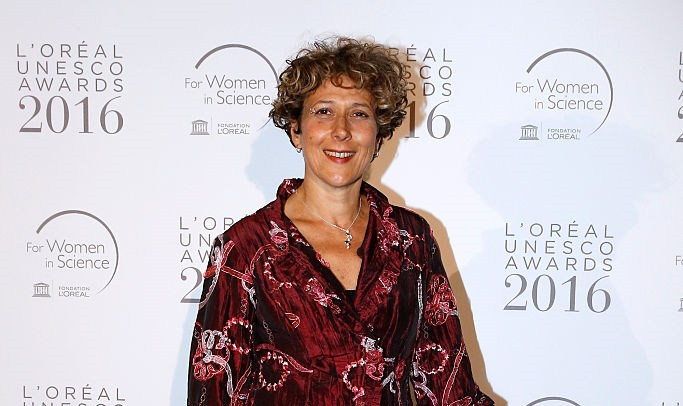
- Andrea Gamarnik at L'Oréal-UNESCO Awards for Women in Science in 2016
- Known for: work on dengue fever
- Scientific career
- Fields: virology

Andrea Gamarnik (Capital Federal, Argentina, 5 October 1964) is an Argentine molecular virologist noted for her work on Dengue fever. She received a 2016 L'Oréal-UNESCO Awards for Women in Science fellowship for work on mosquito-borne viruses, including Dengue fever. She also was granted the Konex Award Merit Diploma in 2013 and the Platinum Konex Award in 2023 for her work in those last decades. She studied at the University of Buenos Aires and the University of California, San Francisco. She has done work for the Leloir Institute. She is the first female Argentine to become a member of the American Academy of Microbiology.

== Biography ==
=== Early years ===
Gamarnik was raised in the city of Lanús. In 1988, she graduated in Biochemistry with a golden medal in the Faculty of Pharmacy and Biochemistry, University of Buenos Aires, due to her family's effort and a scholarship from the Lanus College of Pharmacists. Gamarnik finished her doctorate studies at the same university in 1993. Then, between 1994 and 1999, did a post-doctorate in virology in the University of California in San Francisco, where she studied the molecular mechanisms of poliovirus.

=== Professional career ===
Gamarnik worked at the biotech company ViroLogic on the development of phenotypic assays for HIV, as well as the hepatitis B and C viruses between 2000 and 2001. She returned to Argentina at the end of 2001 to join the Leloir Institute, where she created the first Molecular Virology laboratory, and from which she has already published more than 30 research papers on the dengue virus. From 2005 to 2011, Gamarnik was an International Research Scholar at the Howard Hughes Medical Institute. She is currently head of the Molecular Virology Laboratory at the Leloir Institute Foundation, independent researcher at the National Council for Scientific and Technical Research (CONICET), associate editor of the journal PLoS Pathogens, and member of the editorial board of the journal Virology.

One of the most important research that came out of the Molecular Virology laboratory at the Leloir Institute, was the discovery of the mechanism by which the dengue virus multiplies between molecules. Additionally, in 2015 they determined what the dengue virus needs to pass from mosquito to human, that is, how it changes to be able to infect two types of cells.

Gamarnik actively participates in policy discussions related to the promotion of science and women in science, from speeches at award ceremonies or interviews with sitting presidents in Argentina, to signing public letters with the S&T Group. Additionally, she has published research in prestigious journals in her field such as Genes and Development, Virology, RNA and Journal of Biological Chemistry. Her studies on viral attenuation mechanisms are the basis for the design of vaccines, which resulted in a technology exported to the United States.

During the Coronavirus pandemic in 2020, Gamarnik and her team at the Leloir Institute developed the first antibody test for the SARS-CoV-2 virus, "COVIDAR IgG", in only 45 days. This antibody test was manufactured in Argentina.
