= Marycelin Baba =

Nigerian virologist

Marycelin Baba is a Nigerian virologist. She is currently the Director of the Laboratory, Professor of Medical Virology and lecturer with the University of Maiduguri in Nigeria. She is also an IIE Scholar Rescue Fund (IIE-SRF) alumna. She is most well known for her research that contributed to nearly eliminating wild polio in Nigeria. Nigeria is currently accredited for being polio free.

== Education ==
Baba received her Bachelor of Science degree in microbiology at Ahmadu Bello University in Zaria, Nigeria. In 1992, she received her Master of Science in Virology and in 2005, she received her PhD in virology at the University of Ibadan. Baba describes her PhD research extending for eight years, from 1996 to 2004, due to the lack of reagents for virological studies in Nigeria and lack of funds to import them into Nigeria. However, with the help of Organization for Women in Science for the Developing World, she was able to finish her program and graduate in 2005.

== Career ==
After earning her PhD, Baba became the Head of the Medical Laboratory Science Department at the University of Maiduguri. From 2006 to 2016, she was appointed the Director of the World Health Organization Polio Laboratory in Maiduguri. In 2009, she became the Professor of Medical Virology at Maiduguri University.

In 2012, she had to leave Nigeria due to Boko Haram terror attacks. She settled in South Africa and Kenya where she was able to continue her research after being awarded two Institute of International Education Scholar Rescue Fund fellowships. While she was residing in South Africa, she was able to advance her research on enteroviruses and arboviruses. In 2017, Baba returned to Nigeria. She joined the World Health Organization polio laboratory at the University of Maiduguri Teaching Hospital, where she contributed to the near-complete eradication of polio in Nigeria.

== Research ==
Baba currently researches arbovirus infections in febrile patients and field-caught mosquitoes in Nigeria.

Baba has also contributed to research of COVID and Nigeria's tracking of the COVID virus in Nigeria. She credits her lab being accredited by the World Health Organization for the resources and abilities of the research. She also described how polio and COVID both use RNA extractions for their advances in COVID lab testing compared to other laboratories, and talked about the transmission of COVID in Nigeria during the COVID-19 pandemic.

Recently, she was appointed as Technical Officer for Environmental Surveillance on Polio eradication program at Congo-Brazzaville by the World Health Organization. While Nigeria is nearly polio-free, Baba states the importance of constantly surveilling to make sure there is no repeated outbreaks

== Selected publications ==
- Jenkins, Helen E.; Aylward, R. Bruce; Gasasira, Alex; Donnelly, Christl A.; Mwanza, Michael; Corander, Jukka; Garnier, Sandra; Chauvin, Claire; Abanida, Emmanuel; Pate, Muhammad Ali; Adu, Festus; Baba, Marycelin; Grassly, Nicholas C. (2010-06-24). "Implications of a Circulating Vaccine-Derived Poliovirus in Nigeria". New England Journal of Medicine. 362 (25): 2360–2369. doi:10.1056/NEJMoa0910074. ISSN 0028-4793. PMID 20573924.
- Baba, Marycelin; Masiga, Daniel K; Sang, Rosemary; Villinger, Jandouwe (2016). "Has Rift Valley fever virus evolved with increasing severity in human populations in East Africa?". Emerging Microbes & Infections. 5 (1): e58. doi:10.1038/emi.2016.57. ISSN 2222-1751. PMC 4932650. PMID 27329846.
- Baba, Marycelin M.; Yahaya, Khalid M.; Ezra, Emmanuel M.; Adamu, Musa; Kulloma, Bulama M.; Ikusemoran, Mayomi; Momoh, John P.; Oderinde, Bamidele S. (2021). "Assessment of immunity against Yellow Fever virus infections in northeastern Nigeria using three serological assays". Journal of Medical Virology. 93 (8): 4856–4864. doi:10.1002/jmv.26978. ISSN 0146-6615. PMID 33783842.

== Honors and awards ==
On June 19, 2023, Baba was awarded a Special Tribute of the L'Oreal-UNESCO's For Women in Science International Award due to her contributions of nearly eliminating polio.
