= Gloria Montenegro =

Chilean botanist and academic

Gloria del Carmen Montenegro Rizzardini
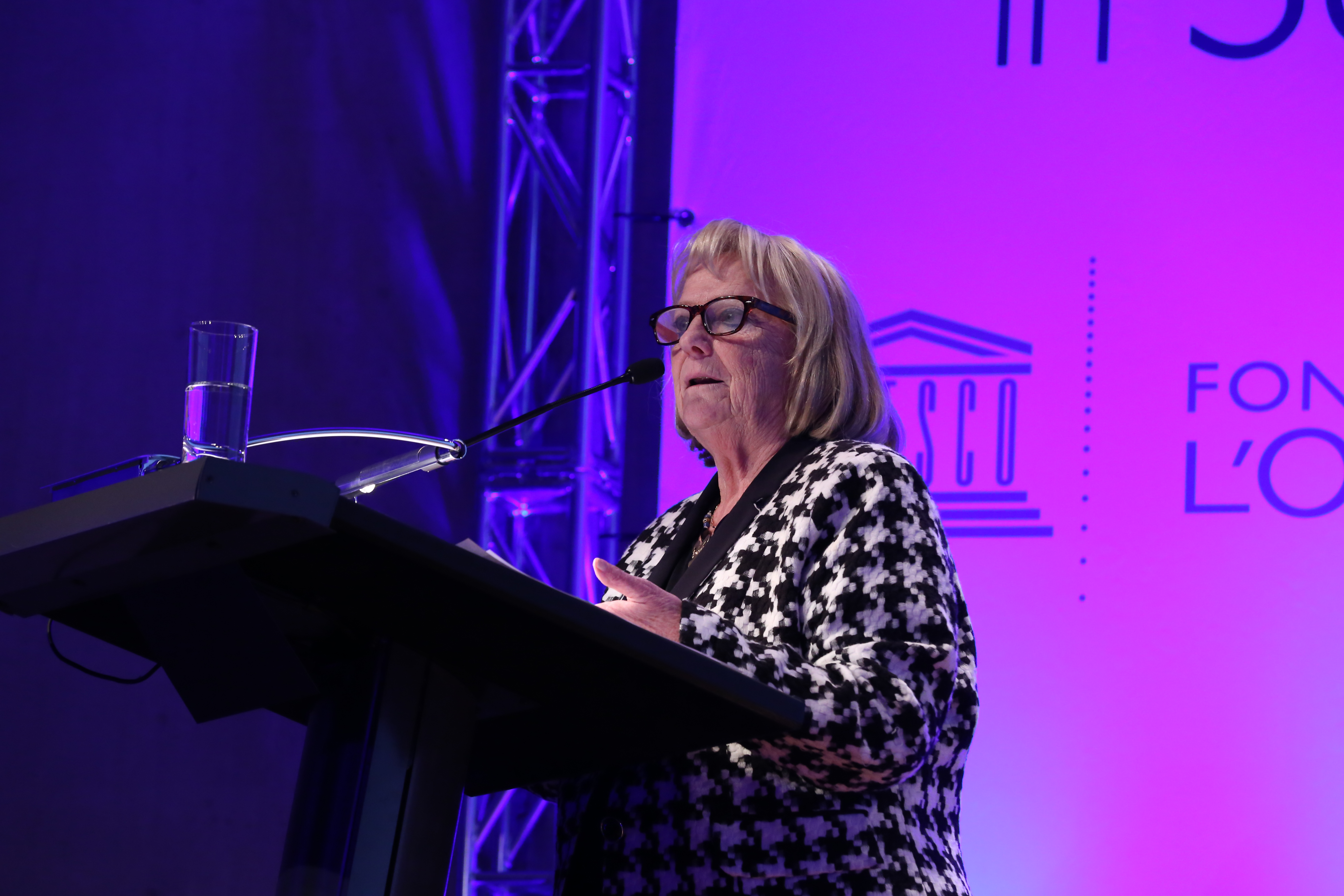
- Gloria del Carmen Montenegro Rizzardini
- Born: Santiago
- Other name: Gloria Montenegro
- Education: Pontificia Universidad Católica de Chile
- Spouse: Claudio Barrios
- Children: 2
- Scientific career
- Fields: botany; apiculture
- Workplaces: Pontificia Universidad Católica de Chile

Gloria del Carmen Montenegro Rizzardini is a Chilean botanist, biologist, academic and scientist. She is Professor of Botany at the Pontificia Universidad Católica de Chile.

== Career ==
Montenegro has been a member of academic staff in Biology and Natural Sciences at Pontificia Universidad Católica de Chile since 1964. She has undertaken pioneering work in botany and conservation of native flora, especially plants that are attractive to bees. She has developed criteria to authenticate honey from different plants and regions of Chile in collaboration with beekeepers and farmers. Her research has also indicated that honey derived from specific plants can be used to control some plant pathogens. Her research into ecosystems has also been used to inform environmental rehabilitation programmes in Chile.

Montenegro has had sabbaticals at several institutions. From 1965 – 1969 she spent time at the Marine Biological Laboratory in Woods-Hole USA and developed skills in histological techniques. During 1970 – 1974 she devoted time to developing the plant ultrastructure and molecular biology skills of her research, including spending time herself at University of Houston, Texas.

== Awards ==
She was awarded the L'Oréal-UNESCO For Women in Science International Award for the Latin America and Caribbean regions in 1998 for her efforts to apply modern science to the protection of plant ecosystem.

== Publications ==
Montenegro is the author or co-author of over 240 scientific publications, as well as books, book chapters, and patents. These include:

- Paula Núñez-Pizarro, Gloria Montenegro, Gabriel Núñez, Marcelo E. Andia, Christian Espinosa-Bustos, Adriano Costa de Camargo, JuanEsteban Oyarzún and Raquel Bridi (2024) Comparative Study of Phenolic Content and Antioxidant and Hepatoprotective Activities of Unifloral Quillay Tree (Quillaja saponaria Molina) and Multifloral Honeys from Chile. Plants 13 (22) 3187.
- Bairon Jorquera and 9 other authors including Gloria Montenegro. (2023) Phenolics from Chilean Bee Bread Exhibit Antioxidant and Antibacterial Properties: The First Prospective Study. Chemistry & Biodiversity 20 (10) e202301015.
- Raquel Bridi, Elias Atala, Paula Núñez Pizarro and Gloria Montenegro (2019) Honeybee Pollen Load: Phenolic Composition and Antimicrobial Activity and Antioxidant Capacity. Journal of Natural Products 83 (3) pp 559–565.
- Susanne Valcic, Gloria Montenegro and Barbara N. Timmermann (1998) Lignans from Chilean Propolis. Journal of Natural Products 61 (6) pp 771–775.
- James D Mauseth, Gloria Montenegro and Alan M Walckowiak (1985) Host infection and flower formation by the parasite Tristerix aphyllus (Loranthaceae). Canadian Journal of Botany 63 (3) pp 567–581.
