= Nagwa Abdel Meguid =

Egyptian geneticist

- نجوى عبد المجيد
- Born: April 7, 1952 (age 74); Egypt
- Education: Arabian Gulf University (PhD); Uppsala University (Fellowship)
- Known for: Identification of genetic mutations related to Fragile X syndrome and autism in the Middle East
- Awards: L'Oréal-UNESCO For Women in Science Award (2002); National Award for Scientific Excellence (2009); NRC Appreciation Prize in Medical Sciences (2011); State Appreciation Award in Advanced Medical Sciences (2017)
- Scientific career
- Fields: Clinical genetics, neurodevelopmental disorders, fragile X syndrome, autism research

Nagwa Abdel Meguid (Arabic: نجوى عبد المجيد) (born April 7, 1952) is an Egyptian geneticist and 2002 winner of the L’Oreal UNESCO Award for Women in Science for Africa and the Middle East. Her research has "identified several genetic mutations that cause common syndromes such as the fragile X syndrome and Autism".

Meguid has a Ph.D. in Human Genetics. Nagwa Abdel Meguid’s research interests include clinical genetics, neurodevelopmental disorders, human DNA technology, and dysmorphology.

== Life ==
Meguid graduated from Arabian Gulf University. She is a fellow of Uppsala University.

== Education ==
Meguid is head of a laboratory researching DNA and biochemical changes in genetic disorders such as autism and fragile X syndrome. She is the head of the Department of Research on Children with Special Needs at the National Research Center (NRC) located in Egypt. Meguid is a Senior Geneticist at the Genetics Institute in Pasadena, California.

Meguid holds memberships in the Regional Bio-Ethics Society and Gender Research in Africa into Information Communication Technologies for Empowerment (GRACE).

== Awards ==
Meguid has prestigious awards for her research in genetics such as the National Award for Scientific Excellence (2009), National Research Centre Appreciation Prize in Medical Sciences (2011), and the Distinctive Arab Female Scientist Prize to name a few. She has also won the prize for the state of Scientific Excellence in Advanced Technology (2008).

She was awarded the State Appreciation Award in Advanced Sciences serving Medical Sciences by the Academy of Scientific Research and Technology (ASRT) (2017).

== Research on Genetic Disorders ==
Meguid has contributed to the research and discovery of gene mutations causing common genetic disorders in the Egyptian population. These genetic disorders include phenylketonuria, Duchene muscular dystrophy, congenital sensorineural hearing loss and fragile X-syndrome. Meguid has developed methods to prevent certain genetic mutations, which includes heterozygous detection and prenatal diagnosis.

She has diagnosed autosomal recessive disorders in Egyptians as a result of a high prevalence of consanguinity in the population.

=== Fragile X Syndrome and Autism Research ===
Meguid first discovered the prevalence of fragile X mutation among Egyptian males. The mutation occurred 0.9 per 1000 Egyptian males. There was a 6.4% prevalence that the mutation would occur in males who were mentally subnormal. Meguid determined that the high prevalence of fragile X in Arab mentally subnormal males may be a result of awareness or diagnoses of the disease. Egyptian males had a late recognition of this genetic mutation past their childhood. The genetic mutations could be predicted as the disease was related to an increased percentage of consanguineous marriages in the Arab population. A delayed awareness of the genetic mutation was also a common cause of other disorders related to mental subnormality. Meguid concluded that the high prevalence of fragile X syndrome should promote special education for those affected. She suggested that an individualized treatment plan starting in preschool could allow students to be more successful in their educational years.

Meguid analyzed brain morphology in both fragile x syndrome with autistic features and autism patients and determined if there are any significant differences in the genetic disorders. 1.5-T magnetic resonance imaging (MRI) was used. No significant differences were found in brain morphology including "total brain volume, regional volume, gyrification index, sulcal depth, and cerebral cortical thickness." Autistic patients had a decrease in the medial prefrontal bilaterally and left anterior cingulate cortices of the brain. The medial prefrontal and the anterior cingulate were found to be significant in social cognition and autistic and fragile X patients were deficient in both. The deficiency in brain morphological features accounted for a social cognitive deficit. Fragile X with autistic features reflected selectively higher scores on social withdrawal scales - deficits were significantly different than those of autistic individuals. Fragile X autistic characteristics were shared with that of idiopathic autism however.

Meguid developed a simple molecular screening method to detect premutation carriers of fragile X syndrome. A premutation carrier is an individual who has between 55-200 CGG repeats in the Fragile X (FMR1) gene. The full mutation has over 200 CGG repeats. The procedure included a rapid modified polymerase chain reaction (PCR)-based screening tool for expanded Fragile X Mental Retardation 1 (FMR1) alleles. The results showed that 16 males out of 53 males had the CGG abnormal repeats characteristic of Fragile X gene. 10 of their mothers and 4 of their sisters also had the FMR1 premutation. 66.6% consanguineous marriages were present in the families studied. It was concluded that fragile X syndrome was ruled out of families with consanguineous parents. Instead, fragile X syndrome could be contributed to earlier carrier detection, which may reduce the number of affected children. By isolating the mutation early, the effects of the disease could be reduced in children and in their development.

=== Discoveries of Genetic Mutations ===
==== Discovery of Inactivating Mutations in the gene Branched Chain Ketoacid Dehydrogenase Kinase ====
Meguid discovered mutations in the gene Branched Chain Ketoacid Dehydrogenase Kinase (BCKDK). Mutations found in BCKDK were found in consanguineous families with epilepsy, autism, and intellectual disabilities. Previously, the BCKDK was known to cause Maple Syrup Urine disease (MSUD). Mutations in this gene could potentially treat autism and epilepsy. The protein is capable of phosphorylation-mediated inactivation of E1α subunit of branched-chain ketoacid dehydrogenase (BCKDH). If a patient has a homozygous mutation (an identical mutation in both paternal and maternal alleles), then reductions are induced in BCKDK messenger RNA and protein, E1α phosphorylation, and amino acids of the plasma membrane.

==== Recessive Non-syndromic Deafness: Mutation in GJB2 gene ====
Meguid described a new mutation for the GJB2 gene ( a gene responsible for recessive non-syndromic deafness) with a deletion of thymine (T) at the position 59 (c.59delT) in the intracellular domain of connexin 26. This mutation caused a frameshift mutation at the 20th amino acid leading to premature termination.
