= Suzana Nunes =

Suzana Pereira Nunes is a chemist. She is the Professor of Chemical and Environmental Science and Engineering and the Vice Provost for Faculty and Academic Affairs at the King Abdullah University of Science and Technology. In 2023, she received the L'Oréal-UNESCO For Women in Science Awards.
