= Brigitte Kieffer =

French neurobiologist

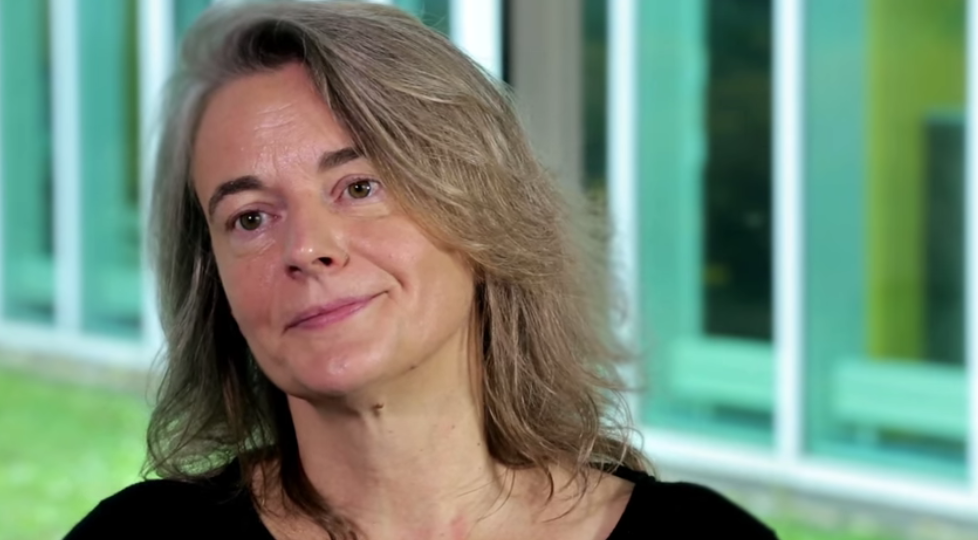
- Brigitte Kieffer en 2014.
- Born: 26 February 1958 (age 68)
- Citizenship: France
- Education: University of Strasbourg
- Known for: Discovery of delta-opioid receptor linked to pain and addiction
- Awards: 2004 Richard Lounsberry Prize, 2012 Lamonica Prize for Neurology, 2014 L'Oréal-UNESCO For Women in Science Award
- Scientific career
- Fields: Molecular Psychiatry, Addiction, Mood Disorders, Pain, and Developmental disorders
- Workplaces: University of Strasbourg, Institut national de la santé et de la recherche médicale (INSERM), Institut de génétique et de biologie moléculaire et cellulaire (IGBMC), McGill University

Dr. Brigitte Kieffer (born 26 February 1958) is a French molecular neurobiologist known for her research of opiate receptors. Her areas of expertise include: molecular psychiatry, addiction, mood disorders, pain, and developmental disorders. Kieffer has international reputation in the field of opiate receptors, and has paved the way for better understanding of brain mechanisms involved in pain, mental illness, and drug addiction. She continues to pursue research and directs a team of over 300 people. Her discoveries have shed light on how substances like morphine or heroin can kill pain, and foster addiction.

== Life ==
Kieffer became a professor at her alma mater which was the University of Strasbourg, in France. She left the university to become the Research Director of the French Institut national de la santé et de la recherche médicale (INSERM). In 2001 she returned to Strasbourg where she continued her research at the Institut de génétique et de biologie moléculaire et cellulaire (IGBMC). The following year Kieffer directed IGBMC until 2013. In January 2014 she took up the Monique H. Bourgeois Chair in Pervasive Developmental Disorder, becoming a Professor of Psychiatry at McGill University in Montreal as well as the Scientific Director of the Research Centre at the Douglas Mental Health University Institute.

== Research ==
In 1992, Kieffer succeeded in "first to clone and isolate the gene for an opioid receptor in the brain that plays a key role in alleviating pain, a puzzle which scientists around the world had been attempting to solve for the previous fifteen years. Her findings led the way to new treatments for fighting pain, addiction and depression". The gene she isolated encoded for an opioid receptor that can reduce pain, generate pleasure, and help cope with stress. The receptors can be activated by drugs, which can cause addictions. Better knowledge of the way that these receptors function can help scientists understand addictions, mood disorders, and mental illness.

"Mental illnesses are biological illnesses. The brain is an organ, certainly a highly complex and fascinating one, but like every other organ in the human body, it can be treated. - Brigitte Kieffer

Her research discoveries have led to development of new analgesic medicines and new treatments for addiction. Opioid system disorders are involved in emotional problems such as anxiety and severe depression. Her research involves many studies regarding opiate addiction. In mice she has researched how the effects of heroin withdrawal can yield depressive behaviors. Her research has shown that after periods of heroin exposure, once mice become abstinent they exhibit depressive-like behaviors that persist weeks after heroin exposure was halted. This information helps explain the severity and chronicity of addiction in certain individuals. Dr. Kieffer's research also deals with how findings can be translated to humans. Study of brain opioid receptors that deal with depression and happiness are often a focus of her research. In many post-mortem studies of suicide victims it was discovered that mu (μ) opioid receptors (MOR) are present in higher density of the frontal and temporal cortex of the human brain when compared with controls of post-mortem studies of patients with no history of psychiatric disorder. This suggests that depression and suicide may be associated with higher MOR density. She tested this theory of MOR association with depressive behavior and the results in mice lead to the conclusion that MOR and depressive behavior are indeed related to one another.

== Awards ==
In 2004 she won the Richard Lounsberry Prize from the Institut de France de l'Académie des Sciences. In 2012 Dr. Kieffer won the Lamonica Prize for Neurology from the French Académie des sciences. At the end of 2013 she became a member of the French Academy of Sciences. On 19 March 2014 she received the L'Oréal-UNESCO For Women in Science Award at the UNESCO building in Paris, France. She received the award for her "for her decisive work on the brain mechanisms involved in pain, mental illness and drug addiction". The award is bestowed by the L'Oréal Foundation and UNESCO recognizes exceptional career paths and contributions of women scientists worldwide. Brigitte Kieffer was selected as the winner for Europe for her work completed at IGBMC in Strasbourg, France.

== Selected publications ==
- The Δ-opioid Receptor: Isolation of a Cdna by Expression Cloning and Pharmacological Characterization". Proceedings of the National Academy of Sciences of the United States of America 89.24 (1992): 12048–12052. Web
- Ayranci, G., et al. "Dissociation of heroin-induced emotional dysfunction from psychomotor activation and physical dependence among inbred mouse strains." Psychopharmacology 232.11 (2015): 1957-1971.
- Lutz, Pierre-Eric, and Brigitte L. Kieffer. "Opioid receptors: distinct roles in mood disorders." Trends in neurosciences 36.3 (2013): 195-206.
