= Abla Mehio Sibai =

Researcher

- Education: London School of Hygiene and Tropical Medicine
- Occupation: Epidemiologist
- Awards: L'Oréal-UNESCO For Women in Science Awards (2020)
- Scientific career
- Fields: Epidemiology; Gerontology
- Workplaces: American University of Beirut

Abla Mehio Sibai (Arabic: عبلة محيو السباعي) is a Professor of Epidemiology at the American University of Beirut (AUB), Lebanon. Sibai has served as the Interim Dean of AUB's Faculty of Health Sciences (FHS) from 2020 to 2022 and is currently the Dean of FHS. She is also the co-founder of the Center for Studies on Aging in Lebanon and co-founding director of the AUB University for Seniors Program.

== Early life and education ==
Despite being inspired by mathematics, Abla Mehio Sibai studied pharmacy at the American University of Beirut, where she earned her bachelor's degree in 1977. Her brief pharmacy career came to a halt because of the violent situation in Lebanon. After being a full-time mother for 10 years, she returned to the American University of Beirut where she got her master's degree in epidemiology in 1986. Sibai received her PhD in epidemiology from London School of Hygiene and Tropical Medicine in 1997.

== Research and career ==
Being a public health scholar, Sibai's research focuses on healthy ageing, social demography, and epidemiology of non-communicable diseases (NCDs). In Lebanon, she led the first Global Burden of Disease in 2002 and the first NCD Behavioral Risk factor Study in 2008. Sibai led the first Global Burden of Disease in 2002 and the first NCD Behavioral Risk factor Study in 2008. Her exploration of existing NCD research in Arab countries, where NCDs represent nearly 60% of the disease burden, highlighted the disconnect between research and policy and the dire need to reduce research waste in resource-scarce countries. She also co-founded the AUB University for Seniors (UFS) program in 2010, and is also the Director of the Center for Studies on Ageing which she co-founded in 2008. She spearheaded the three regional mapping reviews of policies and programs on Ageing in Arab countries (2007, 2012, 2017) and led the development of the 'National Strategy for Older Persons' in Lebanon (2020), for the country's Ministry of Social Affairs. She has published over 200 papers in refereed journals and close to 100 book chapters, scientific and technical reports, and policy briefs.

== Other activities ==
- World Health Organization (WHO), Member of the Science Council (since 2021)
- HelpAge International, Member of the Board of Trustees

== Recognition ==
Sibai was awarded the L'Oréal-UNESCO For Women in Science Award in 2020 "for her pioneering research and advocacy to improve healthy ageing in low- and middle-income countries and their impact on health and social policies and programs." Sibai was also awarded the Dr A.T. Shousha Foundation Prize in 2014 for her contributions to public health, and The State of Kuwait Prize for the Control of Cancer, Cardiovascular Diseases and Diabetes in the Eastern Mediterranean Region in 2019. She was also awarded from AUB in 1990 the Kiram Siniora Research Prize in Social Sciences, Population Studies, Anthropology and Epidemiology and the Best Research Award in 1989.
