= María Guadalupe Guzmán =

Cuban virologist and physician (b. 1952)

Maria Guadalupe Guzmán (born January 19, 1952) is a Cuban virologist and doctor. She is the current director of Research, Diagnosis and Reference at the Research Center of the Pedro Kouri Institute (IPK) in Havana, Cuba.

Guzmán is known for her pioneering research on the pathogenesis, diagnosis, and vaccination for dengue virus, the origin of dengue virus epidemics, and the recognizing of secondary infection as a major risk factor for dengue hemorrhagic fever.

== Life and career ==
As a child, Maria Guadalupe Guzmán had an innate curiosity about the natural world. Before settling the focus of her study and research of virology and medicine, she had an interest in astronomy.

After choosing the path of biology and medicine and beginning her science trajectory, Guzmán has worked in prestigious institutions of scientific research in Cuba, including CENIC (Centro Nacional de Investigaciones Científicas) and IPK (Institutio Pedro Kouri), and participated in prestigious collaborations with non-governmental organizations like the World Health Organization and Pan American Health Organization.

In 1980, Guzman married Gustavo Kourí, the director of IPK, who was a mentor to her later academic and research career. The couple lived in IPK for over 30 years, and dedicated their lives to research in virology.

== Research ==
Guzmán has contributed to virology research for over 30 years and has made over 300 publications as of 2024, with a specific focus on dengue hemorrhagic fever and arboviruses. (1) The first epidemic that she encountered in her career was the hemorrhagic dengue epidemic of 1981, from which she would continue to delve deeper into research around this disease and similar epidemics like this. Guzmán is the senior researcher to over 70 projects nationally and internationally and the educator for over 130 courses in Cuba and other regions of the Americas. She also holds seven patents and has written 20 book chapters.

Guzmán is a member of the Organization of Women Scientists of the third world, Dengue Working Group of the Pan American Health Organization (PAHO) and American Society of Tropical Medicine and Hygiene. She also serves on the Advisory Committee on Dengue and JBD vaccines of the World Health Organization. From 2010 to 2018, Guzmán served as the director of the WHO/PAHO Collaborating Center for Dengue and its Control, and the president of Network of Diagnostic Laboratories of Arbovirus of the Americas (RELDA). She is the current president of the Cuban Society of Microbiology and Parasitology. Guzmán is a distinguished professor and a contributor to Cuba's Public Health Encyclopedia, where she is the author of the chapter on Dengue Fever.

During the COVID-19 pandemic, Doctor Maria Guadalupe Guzman also participated in national research on SARS-CoV-2 diagnosis, vaccination, and surveillance of its many variants that emerged as the pandemic developed.

== Awards ==
Guzmán is the recipient of 2021's L'Oréal-UNESCO For Women in Science Awards, awarded each year to five prominent woman scientists from each of the five regions of the world.
