= María Teresa Dova =

Argentine physicist

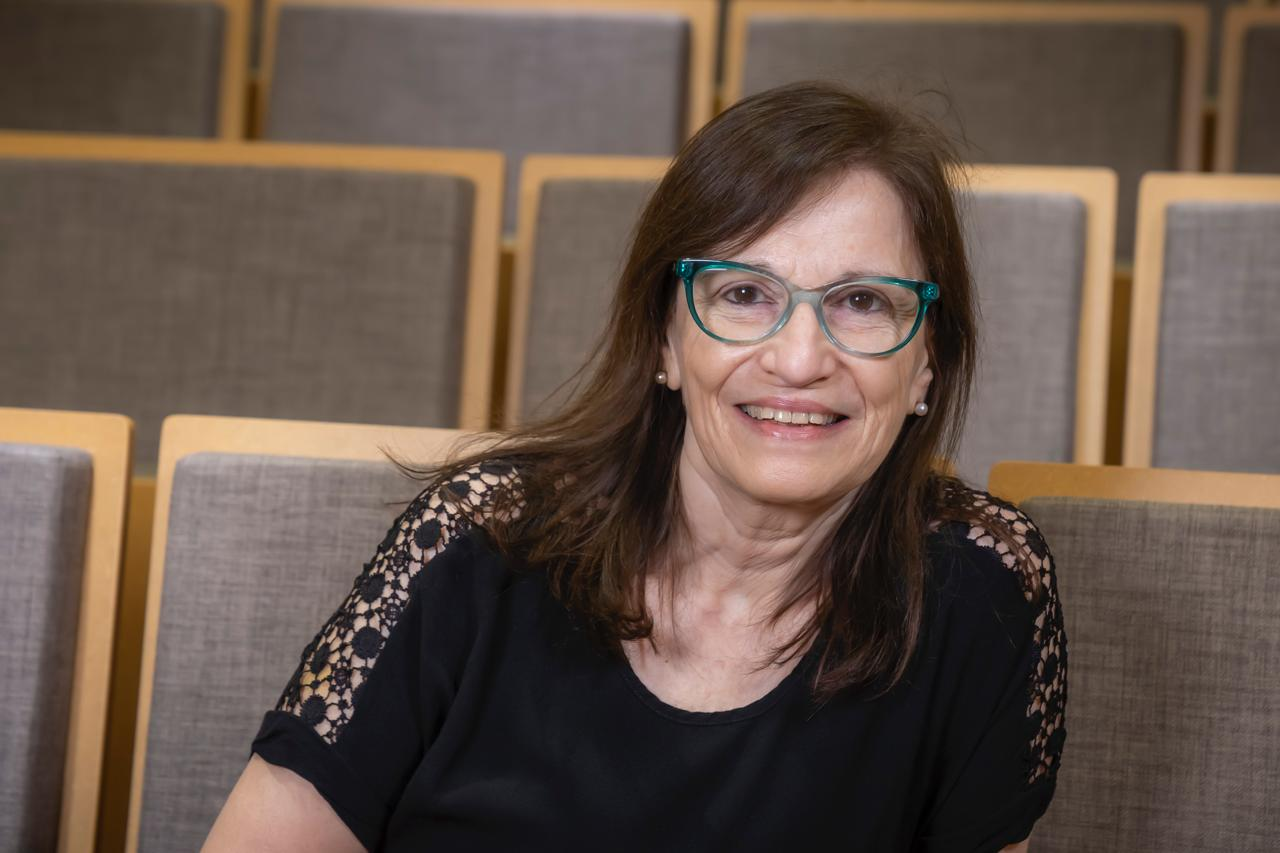
- Professor María Teresa Dova
- Born: 21 September 1959 (age 67); Alberti, Buenos Aires, Argentina
- Citizenship: Argentine
- Education: National University of La Plata
- Scientific career
- Fields: Physics (Particle physics)
- Workplaces: CONICET, UNLP

María Teresa Dova is an Argentine physicist, born in Alberti, Buenos Aires province. She is a senior researcher at National Scientific and Technical Research Council (CONICET) in Argentina and professor in the Physics Department of the Faculty of Exact Sciences at the National University of La Plata.

== Biography ==
Dova was raised in Alberti, Buenos Aires. She studied physics at the National University of La Plata, where she obtained her PhD in 1988 with the thesis "Phase transitions in highly coordinated fluorinated Hf and Zr compounds", advised by María C. Caracoche.

In 1989, she was awarded a postdoctoral fellowship to study at the L3 experiment led by Samuel Chao Chung Ting at the European Organisation for Nuclear Research (CERN) where she began her career in experimental high-energy physics investigating the physics of the tau lepton and the characteristics of neutral and charged weak interaction.

In 1996, she participated in the creation of the Pierre Auger Observatory designed to study high-energy cosmic rays, promoting the participation of the National University of La Plata in the experiment. She contributed relevant studies of the propagation of ultra-high energy cosmic rays (UHECR) in the intergalactic medium and the composition of cosmic rays. In 2001, she was elected Chair of the Collaboration Board, composed of representatives of 49 institutions from the 17 participating countries, and was re-elected until 2006.

In 2005, she led the joint Argentinean effort for the country's first participation in the ATLAS experiment at CERN. This is one of the two multi-proposite detectors of the Large Hadron Collider (LHC), designed to search for the Higgs Boson and study its properties, precision measurements of the Standard Model and the search for new particles and interactions.

She has published hundreds of papers resulting from her research in condensed matter physics, particle physics phenomenology, ultra-high-energy cosmic rays, and data analysis, co-authored with the L3 and ATLAS collaborations at CERN and the Pierre Auger Observatory. She has supervised eleven doctoral theses and about a dozen undergraduate theses at the National University of La Plata, the University of Buenos Aires, and the National University of Córdoba. From 2001 to 2007, she was an Adjunct Professor at Northeastern University, in Boston. She served on the Editorial Board of the Journal of Physics G: Nuclear and Particle Physics, published by IOP Publishing in the United Kingdom (2008–2014). She has delivered over eighty presentations at international scientific conferences and invited seminars at universities and laboratories around the world. She has been part of the scientific and international committees of some of the most prominent conferences in particle physics (ICHEP, LHCP, CRIS, ICRC). In Latin America, she was a founding member of SILAFAE (Latin American Symposium on High Energy Physics) and local director of the third (2005) and tenth (2019) editions of the CERN–LA School of HEP held in Argentina.

She has also engaged in science communication through various media, offering seminars and interviews, including participation in TEDx Paseo del Bosque (La Plata, 2013) and the science TV program La Liga de la Ciencia on Argentina's public television channel. She is the author of the book ¿Qué es el bosón de Higgs? (What is the Higgs boson?), published by Paidos.

== Awards and honors ==
1998 – Presidency of Argentina, Secretariat of Science and Technology: Dr. Eduardo D.P. De Robertis Award for encouraging the reintegration of young researchers into the Argentine scientific system.

2002 – John Simon Guggenheim Foundation Fellowship.

2007 – SCOPUS Award, from Elsevier (Netherlands) and SECyT.

2008 – Recognition by the National University of La Plata for her career achievements.

– Named "Illustrious Citizen" of the City of La Plata. – "Outstanding Woman of the Year" award, granted by the Chamber of Deputies of Argentina.

2009 – "Innovative Woman in Science" Award, Chamber of Deputies of the Province of Buenos Aires.

2013 – High Energy and Particle Physics Prize of the European Physical Society. Group award. To the ATLAS and CMS collaborations, for the discovery of a Higgs boson, as predicted by the Brout–Englert–Higgs mechanism.

2015 – Named "Illustrious Citizen" of the Province of Buenos Aires for her significant contribution to scientific research. Senate of the Province of Buenos Aires, Law 14.795.

2022 – TWAS Prize in Physics.

2022 – Recognition: Named one of the world's leading female scientists according to Research.com's 2022 ranking of the Top 1000 Female Scientists, placing at number 38.

2023 – Konex Award – Diploma of Merit for her work in the last decade in Physics and Astronomy, granted by the Konex Foundation.

2025 – L'Oréal-UNESCO For Women in Science Awards.
