= Ayşe Erzan =

Turkish physicist

Ayşe Erzan (born 1949) is a Turkish theoretical physicist. She has received a number of awards including a L'Oréal-UNESCO Award for Women in Science in 2003 and a Rammal Award in 2009.

== Biography ==
Ayşe Erzan was born in 1949 in Ankara. Following secondary studies in Istanbul, Erzan attended Bryn Mawr College in the United States, earning her B.A. in 1970. She received a Ph.D. in physics from Stony Brook University in 1976.

Erzan returned to Ankara, spending a year at Middle East Technical University as a member of the physics department. She joined Istanbul Technical University in 1977. During that time she was involved in the peace and women's movements. Following the 1980 Turkish coup d'état, she left the country. From 1981 to 1990 Erzan worked and taught at various research institutions and universities. From 1981 to 1982 she worked at the University of Geneva's Department of Theoretical Physics. From 1982 to 1985 she was visiting assistant professor at the University of Porto in Portugal. She was then an Alexander von Humboldt Fellow at the University of Marburg's Department of Theoretical Physics from 1985 to 1987. From 1987 until 1990, she worked as a research scientist at the University of Groningen. Erzan was briefly a research fellow at the International Centre for Theoretical Physics in Trieste before returning to Istanbul Technical University in 1990. She also continued research at the Feza Gürsey Institute.

Erzan became an associate of the Turkish Academy of Sciences in 1995 and was granted full membership in 1997. She received the Scientific and Technological Research Council of Turkey science prize that same year. Erzan received a L'Oréal-UNESCO Award for Women in Science in 2003 and the Rammal Award in 2009. For her lifelong commitment to human rights, she was honored with the 2020 Andrei Sakharov Prize by the American Physical Society. She is a member of The World Academy of Sciences and The Science Academy Society of Turkey, and is on the editorial boards of both the Journal of Statistical Physics and European Physical Journal B.
