= Rose Leke =

Cameroonian malariologist and scientist

- Born: Rose; Cameroon
- Citizenship: Cameroonian
- Education: Saint Mary-of-the-Woods College; University of Illinois Urbana-Champaign; Université de Montréal
- Occupations: Professor, Researcher
- Employer: University of Yaounde
- Known for: Research in malaria
- Title: Prof
- Awards: L'Oréal-UNESCO Award for Women in Science

Rose Gana Fomban Leke is a Cameroonian malariologist and Emeritus Professor of Immunology and Parasitology at the University of Yaounde I. She was awarded the L'Oréal-UNESCO Award for Women in Science in 2024.

== Early life and education ==
When Leke was growing up she suffered from malaria multiple times, it was a normal part of life. She was first interested in medicine due to treatment she received for lung abscess in Limbe when she was six years old. Her mother never went to school, however her father was a school teacher, and both encouraged her to pursue educational opportunities. She went to Saint Mary-of-the-Woods College, Indiana, US in 1966 for her undergraduate studies, and then University of Illinois Urbana-Champaign for her master's degree in the lab of David Silverman. Leke pursued her PhD, titled Murine plasmodia: chronic, virulent and self-limiting infections, at the Université de Montréal, Canada in 1975.

== Research ==
Professor Leke's research has focussed on pregnancy-associated malaria, in which even women who have developed immunity to the severest forms of malaria can be stricken by a life-threatening form of the disease, with implications on the health of the baby. She established a long-time collaboration with Diana Taylor at the University of Hawaii at Manoa to investigate this condition. Together they published a study in 2018 that indicated that increased numbers of parasites during pregnancy-associated malaria actually conferred better protection in the baby to future malaria infections, and suggested that a less-severe pregnancy-associated infection may predispose the child towards greater incidence of disease.

== Awards and recognition ==
- Leke has been a senior member of many organisations in the fields of immunology and malaria.
- She received the UNESCO-L’Oréal Award for Women in Science in 2024.
- Leke established the Cameroon Coalition Against Malaria.
- She served as president of the Federation of African Immunological Societies from 1997 to 2001, and as a council member of the International Union of Immunological Societies from 1998 to 2004.
- In 2002, a presidential decree appointed Leke as the chair of the Board of Directors of Cameroon's National Medical Research Institute.
- She was awarded the 2011 Kwame Nkrumah Scientific Award for Women by the African Union.
- Leke retired from senior university positions in 2013, having been head of the Department of Medicine and Director of the Biotechnology Centre at the University of Yaoundé I.
- She was invited to deliver the 2014 Aggrey‐Fraser‐Guggisberg Memorial Lecture at the University of Ghana and was awarded an honorary Doctor of Science (DSc) degree by the same institution.
- In 2015, Leke was elected an honorary international fellow of the American Society of Tropical Medicine and Hygiene. She also founded the Higher Institute for Growth in Health Research for Women Consortium, aimed at mentoring women scientists in Cameroon.
- In 2018, Leke was honored as a Heroine of Health by Women in Global Health and General Electric Healthcare during the World Health Assembly in Geneva.
- In 2019, she was ceremonially named Queen Mother of the Cameroon Medical Community by the Cameroon Medical Council.
- Leke is a member of the World Health Organization Malaria Policy Advisory Committee and the International Health Regulations Emergency Committee on Polio Eradication.
- In 2023, she received the Virchow Prize, honoring her pioneering infectious disease research towards a malaria-free world and her dedication to advancing gender equality. The prize is endowed with 500,000 euros and was established by the non-profit Virchow Foundation.
- Her contributions to science were acknowledged in the book Towards Women Participation in Scientific Research in Africa.

== Personal life ==
Leke has many grandchildren.
