= Lúcia Mendonça Previato =

Brazilian biologist

Lúcia Mendonça Previato (born 1949) is a Brazilian biologist. She was awarded the L'Oréal-UNESCO Awards for Women in Science in 2004 for her research into preventing Chagas disease.

== Biography ==
Lucia Mendonça Previato was born in 1949, in Maceió, Brazil and moved with her family to Rio de Janeiro when she was 5 years old. She graduated from Universidade Santa Úrsula in 1971 and obtained her Doctorate from the Federal University of Rio de Janeiro in Microbiology and Immunology in 1976.

She did her post-doctoral work at the National Research Council of Canada, in Saskatoon, in Carbohydrate Chemistry and then moved to the Department of Biochemistry at the University of California, Berkeley, with biochemist Clinton E. Ballou. After returning to the Federal University of Rio de Janeiro in 1980, she set up the Surface Structure of Microorganisms Laboratory at the university's Institute of Microbiology, became a Full Professor in 1992, and directed the lab until 2001. It was then that she was named Director of the Laboratory of Glycobiology at the Institute of Biophysics Carlos Chagas Filho, Federal University of Rio de Janeiro.

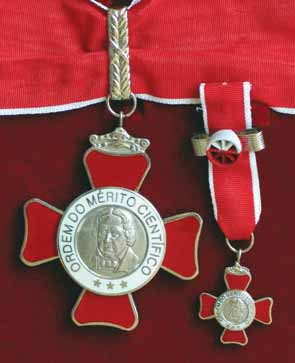
Ordem Nacional Mérito Científico Comendador

In her research, Previato and her team discovered the mechanism that allows Trypanosoma cruzi, the protozoan that transmits Chagas disease, to bypass the immune system when it infects a human organism. This discovery earned her one of the L'Oréal-UNESCO For Women in Science Awards in 2004. She also received the TWAS Prize in Biology in 2007 and the National Order of Scientific Merit (Comendador) in 2001.

== Personal life ==
She is married to Jose Osvaldo Previato and has two children.

== Selected awards and honors ==
- National Research Council of Brazil, Top Research Career Investigator, 1986
- Petrobras Award, National Invention Prize, 1987
- Member of the Brazilian Academy of Sciences, 1992
- International Research Scholar, Howard Hughes Medical Institute, 1997
- Scientist of Rio de Janeiro State Award in Biological Sciences, 1999
- Editor-in-Chief of Annals of the Brazilian Academy of Science, 2003
