= Yu Myeong-Hee =

South Korean microbiologist

- Born: 5 September 1954 (age 72); Seoul
- Education: Seoul National University; University of California, Berkeley
- Occupation: Microbiologist

Korean name
- Hangul: 유명희
- Hanja: 柳明姬
- RR: Yu Myeonghui
- MR: Yu Myŏnghŭi

Yu Myeong-Hee (born 5 September 1954) is a South Korean microbiologist, currently serving as the president of Korea Federation of Women's Science & Technology Associations and a principle researcher at the Korea Institute of Science and Technology. In July 2010, under President Lee Myung-bak, she was appointed as an inaugural Chief Secretary to the Future Strategy Planning Office, and served until February 2013.

== Early life and education ==
Yu was born in Seoul. She realized that she was interested in science and technology when she was in middle school. Yu earned her Bachelor of Science degree in microbiology from Seoul National University in 1977 and her doctorate in microbiology from University of California, Berkeley in 1982. She later worked as a postdoctoral fellow at the Massachusetts Institute of Technology (MIT) in 1985.

== Career ==
=== Scientific research ===
After moving back to Korea, Yu worked at Korea Research Institute of Bioscience and Biotechnology until 2000. After that, she has been working at Korea Institute of Science and Technology, holding a position of a principle research scientist. Much of Yu's work has focused on unlocking the structure and folding of the protein alpha-1 antitrypsin, which is a serpin protein. Yu and her research team have worked to discover what amino acids can suppress certain types of mutations, such as the tsf mutation which is a protein folding error. She has also patented the alpha-1 antitrypsin mutein with a disulfide bond and the method for preparing it along with her research group.

Her work has appeared in Nature, The Journal of Proteome Research, the Proceedings of the National Academy of Sciences of the United States of America, the Journal of Molecular Biology, the Journal of Biological Chemistry, the BMB Reports, and others. Her work is highly cited in the fields of biochemistry, genetics, molecular biology, immunology and microbiology.

=== Public work ===
Yu served as the Director of the Functional Proteomics Center, a part of the 21st Century Frontier R&D Program, at the Korea Institute of Science and Technology from July 2002 to July 2010. In 2010, she was appointed to a new post in the South Korean government: senior officer for national future. Her responsibilities included overseeing government communications regarding science and technology and to help promote low-carbon and green technologies. She also served as the president of the Korean Biophysical Society from 2009 to 2010, and the president of the Korea Genome Organization in 2010.

== Awards and recognition ==
- Mock-Am Award from the Korean Society of Molecular Biology (1996)
- L'Oréal-UNESCO Award for Women in Science (1998)
- The Seoul City Cultural Award (2001)
- The Order of Science and Technology and the Ungbi Medal, from the Korean Government (2004)
