= Kayo Inaba =

Japanese immunologist

Kayo Inaba is a professor at Kyoto University where she heads the Graduate School of Biostudies. She is also the Vice-President for Gender Equality and the Director of the Centre for Women Researchers.

Inaho is known for her work on dendritic cells and she won the Asia pacific UNESCO Awards for Women in Science in 2014. She has shown the importance of dendritic cells to the immune system and how they can live outside of the body.

== Life ==
Inaba graduated from the Kyoto University with a Ph.D. in 1978. From 1982 until 2011, She was visiting faculty member in Ralph Steinman’s lab. She is executive vice-president for gender equality, international affairs, public relations, and director of the International Strategy Office at Kyoto University. Inaba was the first female associate professor in the science department at Kyoto University. Inaba is on the board of the Japanese Society for Immunology.

In 2024, she was designated as one of Japan's Persons of Cultural Merit.

== Works ==
- Ralph Steinman; Maggie Pack; Kayo Inaba (11 November 2013). "Dendritic Cell Development and Maturation". In Paola Ricciardi-Castagnoli (ed.). Dendritic Cells in Fundamental and Clinical Immunology. Springer Science & Business Media. pp. 1–. ISBN 978-1-4757-9966-8.
- Kayo Inaba; Muneo Inaba; Margit Witmer-Pack; Karen Hathcock; Richard Hodes; Ralph Steinman (6 December 2012). "Expression of B7 Costimulator Molecules on Mouse Dendritic Cells". In Jacques Banchereau; Daniel Schmitt (eds.). Dendritic Cells in Fundamental and Clinical Immunology. Springer Science & Business Media. pp. 65–. ISBN 978-1-4615-1971-3.
- Ralph M. Steinman; Kayo Inaba; Gerold Schuler; MArgit Witmer (1 January 1986). "Stimulation of the Immune Response: Contributions of Dendritic Cells". In Ralph M. Steinman; Robert John North (eds.). Mechanisms of Host Resistance to Infectious Agents, Tumors, and Allografts: A Conference in Recognition of the Trudeau Institute Centennial. Rockefeller Univ. Press. pp. 71–. ISBN 9780874700428. UCAL:B4499585.
