= Alejandra Bravo =

Mexican biochemist (born 1961)

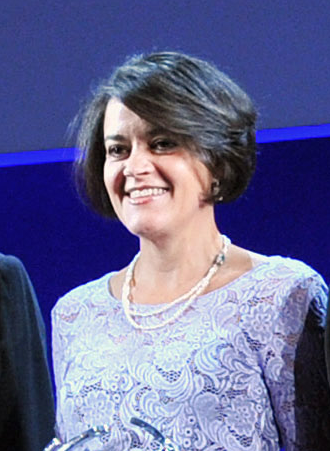
- Born: 29 April 1961 (age 65); Mexico
- Awards: 2010 L'Oréal-UNESCO Award for Women in Science (Latin America).
- Scientific career
- Fields: Biochemistry
- Workplaces: National Autonomous University of Mexico (UNAM)

María Alejandra Bravo de la Parra (born 29 April 1961) is a Mexican biochemist who was laureated with the 2010 L'Oréal-UNESCO Award for Women in Science – Latin America for her work on a bacterial toxin that acts as a powerful insecticide. Bravo has co-authored multiple papers with her husband Mario Soberon.

== Biography ==
Bravo holds bachelor (1985), master (1986) and doctoral (1989) degrees in Basic Biomedical Research from the National Autonomous University of Mexico (UNAM). She did research residencies at the Plant Genetic Systems biotech company in Ghent, Belgium (1990-1991) and Institut Pasteur in Paris, France.

Bravo is a researcher in the Institute of Molecular Microbiology at the National Autonomous University of Mexico (UNAM) and member of the Mexican Academy of Sciences.

Bravo has created four international patents, which are currently UNAM industrial property. In 2010, she was the laureate of the 2010 L'Oréal-UNESCO Award for Women in Science – Latin America.

== Controversy of the studies on Bacillus thuringiensis ==
=== Publications and separation of the Institute of Biotechnology of the UNAM ===
In September 2012, a group of researchers published a critical review on the action models of Bacillus thuringiensis insecticides in which it was concluded that the Mexican models were not replicable, based on the analysis of eleven publications by Alejandra Bravo and her husband Mario Soberon. Due to this, both scientists were removed from their positions, Bravo from the presidency of the Bioethics Commission and Soberón as the head of the Department of Molecular Microbiology. An evaluation commission was set up to analyze the facts, made up of Rubén Lisker, Rosario Muñoz and Jean Philippe Vielle Calzada. According to the investigation carried out by the commission, two of the eleven articles presented "clear and compelling evidence of inappropriate and categorically reprehensible manipulations." Some members of the Technical Council for Scientific Research indicated that manipulation "is not intended to change the results, but to improve an image to generate greater contrast." The two scientists then accepted their error, communicating that to the editors of the journals of those affected publications, who then did not request corrections or errata.

=== Claim and reinstatement ===
The fact of having "manipulated" the images in 2 of the publications caught the attention of the Office of Scientific Integrity (ORI) of the United States National Institutes of Health (NIH), which reviewed the facts and concluded that this did not constitute wrongdoing but that it had been inappropriate to modify some images on the studies of the bacterium Bacillus thuringiensis (BT). ORI decided to continue supporting academically and financially the work of both researchers. Thus, in April 2013, the ORI stated that all reasonable and practical efforts should be made to restore and protect the reputation of Bravo and Soberón since there was no finding of breaches of research ethics.

On the other hand, since January 2013, the Office of the Ombudsman for University Rights of the National Autonomous University of Mexico began an in-depth investigation of this case, to provide a definitive solution. They summoned various authorities and members of the university community: the director of the Institute of Biotechnology, some members of the Internal Council of the institute, the coordinator of Scientific Research of the UNAM and the affected researchers themselves. Finally, on September 27, 2013, the Ombudsman recommended to the Institute of Biotechnology to reinstate Bravo and Soberón to their academic activities with all their responsibilities and privileges. These agreements were already approved by the Internal Council of the IBt, which means that the two researchers are fully reintegrated into the academic life of their institution, without the burden of sanctions.

According to the opinion of Juan Ramón de la Fuente, Bravo and Soberón saw their professional careers affected by excessive suspicion and distortion of the facts. He also commented: "It is not advisable to overemphasize the results obtained, but it is not a crime either." Jorge Ulises Carmona Tinoco - defender of University Rights - pointed out certain irregularities that existed during the investigation process of the investigating commission in 2012: a) one of the plaintiffs was part of the committee that evaluated the case and b) there was no opportunity for Bravo and Soberón to argue their position. He also commented in this regard that the punishment was too severe for the manipulation of the images, "it is not exoneration," said Carmona, his office simply concluded that the punishment had already been sufficient after a year.

== Selected publications ==
- M. Soberon, L. Pardo, C. Muñoz-Garay, J. Sánchez, I. Gómez, H. Porta, A. Bravo. 2010. Pore Formation by Cry Toxins. En: Lakey, J. Proteins: Membrane Binding and Pore Formation (serie Advances in Experimental Medicine and Biology volume 677). Austin, TX. Landes Bioscience y Springer. pp. 127–142
- A. Bravo, S.S. Gill, M. Soberon. 2010. Bacillus thuringiensis Mechanisms and Use with addendum 2010. En: Gill, S.S. Insect Control Biological and Synthetic Agents. Elsevier. pp. 247–282
- M. Soberon, A. Bravo. 2008. Las toxinas Cry de Bacillus thuringiensis: modo de acción y consecuencias de su aplicación. En: Lopez-Munguia, A. Una ventana al quehacer científico. Instituto de Biotecnología de la UNAM 25º aniversario, capítulo 27. México, D.F. UNAM. pp. 303–314
- L. Masson, J. Letowski, A. Bravo, R. Brousseau. 2007. Using DNA Microarrays for Assessing Crystal Protein Genes in Bacillus thuringiensis. En: Proceedings of the 6th Pacific Rim Conference on the Biotechnology of Bacillus thuringiensis and its Environmental Impact. pp. 28–30
- L. Pardo, I. Gómez, C. Muñoz-Garay, N. Jiménez-Juárez, J. Sánchez, C. Pérez, M. Soberon, A. Bravo. 2007. Oligomer Formation of Different Cry Toxins Indicates that a Pre-Pore is an Essential Intermediate in the Mode of Action of the Three-Domain Cry Family. En: Proceedings of the 6th Pacific Rim Conference on the Biotechnology of Bacillus thuringiensis and its Environmental Impact. pp. 7–8
- C. Pérez, L.E. Fernández, J.G. Sun, J.L. Folch, S.S. Gill, M. Soberon, A. Bravo. 2007. Cyt1Aa from Bacillus thuringiensis subsp. israelensis Synergizes Cry11Aa Toxin Activity by Functioning as a Membrane-Bound Receptor. En: Proceedings of the sixth Pacific Rim Conference on the Biotechnology of Bacillus thuringiensis and its Environmental Impact. pp. 9–11
- M. Soberon, I. Gómez, L. Pardo, C. Muñoz, L.E. Fernández, C. Pérez, S.S. Gill, A. Bravo. 2007. Important Interactions with membrane Receptors in the Mode of Action of Bacillus thuringiensis Cry toxins. En: Vincent, C. 6th Pacific Rim Conference on the biotechnology of Bacillus thuringiensis and its Environmental Impact, capítulo 1. MontreaL. Erudit. pp. 1–6
- I. Gómez, J. Miranda-Ríos, I. Arenas, R. Grande, B. Becerril, A. Bravo, M. Soberon. 2007. Identification of scFv Molecules that Recognize Loop 3 of Domain II and Domain III of Cry1Ab Toxin from Bacillus thuringiensis. En: Vincent, C. 6th Pacific Rim Conference on the biotechnology of Bacillus thuringiensis and its Environmental Impact. MontreaL. Erudit. pp. 12–14

== Distinctions and awards ==
- 1990-1991: Research residency at the Plant Genetic Systems biotech company in Ghent, Belgium.
- 1998: Prize from the Mexican Academy of Sciences in the natural sciences field.
- 2000: Young academic distinction in natural sciences from the National Autonomous University of Mexico (UNAM).
- 2002: Fellow of the Mexican Academy of Sciences.
- 2003: Best agricultural biotechnology research from AgroBIO-Mexico.
- Since 2003 she has been part of the biosafety expert committee from the Cartagena Protocol on Biosafety and the Convention on Biological Diversity.
- 2010: L'Oréal-UNESCO Award for Women in Science – Latin America.

== See also ==
- List of people from Morelos
