= Heather Zar =

South African physician

Heather J Zar
- Education: University of the Witwatersrand; Columbia University; University of Cape Town
- Scientific career
- Fields: Pediatrics, Pulmonology
- Workplaces: University of Cape Town; Red Cross War Memorial Children's Hospital

Heather J Zar is a South African physician and scientist specialising in the care of children with respiratory diseases like asthma, tuberculosis and pneumonia.

== Career and impact ==
Professor Zar is the Chair of the Department of Paediatrics and Child Health at the University of Cape Town and also serves as the President of the Pan African Thoracic Society.

Her work on HIV/AIDS related lung disease has helped to change World Health Organization and national guidelines. Work on using low cost recycled plastic bottles as spacers, to help children more easily inhale aerosolized asthma medication, has garnered Zar global attention. Zar is one of the leaders of a study of about 1000 children that are being closely followed up over time to better understand and develop preventive strategies to address childhood lung disease and other ailments. She is a member of the Academy of Science of South Africa. Professor Zar has published over 200 scientific articles.

== Awards and honors ==
- American Thoracic Society World Lung Health Award 2014
- L'Oréal-UNESCO For Women in Science Awards in 2018
