= Zohra ben Lakhdar =

Tunisian spectroscopist

- Born: March 12, 1943
- Education: Pierre and Marie Curie University
- Scientific career
- Fields: Spectroscopy
- Thesis: Application à l'étude de la raie 4047Å de mercure de la méthode à balayage magnétique (1978)

Zohra ben Lakhdar Akrout (Arabic: زهرة بن لخضر عكروت; born 12 March 1943) is a Tunisian spectroscopist specializing in developing new spectroscopic methods to study the influence of pollutants on the quality of air, water, and plants. She earned in 2005 the L’Oréal-UNESCO Awards for Women in Science.

== Career ==
Ben Lakhdar graduated in 1968 from Pierre and Marie Curie University. She earned her PhD from the same university in 1978 with a thesis entitled "Application à l'étude de la raie 4047Å de mercure de la méthode à balayage magnétique" (study of the line shape of 4047Å mercury line using a tunable magnetic field). She went back to Tunisia to become professor in 1982 at the Tunis University and served as director of the Laboratory of Atomic Molecular Spectroscopy and Applications (LSAMA). She was a founding member of the Tunisian Physics Society and a founding member of the Tunisian Astronomy Society.

== Honours ==
She was elected in 1992 to the Islamic World Academy of Sciences. She is a fellow of the African Academy of Science since 2006. She became senior associate member at the Abdus Salam International Centre for Theoretical Physics (ICTP). She earned in 2005 the L’Oréal-UNESCO Awards for Women in Science for "experiments and models in infrared spectroscopy and its applications to pollution, detection and medicine". She was identified as a Science hero by The My Hero Project.
