= Ana María López Colomé =

Mexican biochemist

- Born: Mexico
- Awards: 2002 L'Oréal-UNESCO Award for Women in Science.
- Scientific career
- Fields: Biochemistry
- Workplaces: National Autonomous University of Mexico (UNAM)

Ana María López Colomé is a distinguished Mexican biochemist who won the 2002 L'Oréal-UNESCO Award for Women in Science – Latin America for her studies on the human retina and the prevention of retinitis pigmentosa and several retinopathies.

Ana María López Colomé was born in Mexico City on September 24, 1944. She earned all three of her academic degrees from the National Autonomous University of Mexico (UNAM): a bachelor's in biology, a master's in chemical sciences, and a doctorate in biochemistry. She began her career at UNAM in 1975 as an assistant to a full professor. In 1997, she became head of the Biochemistry Department and a researcher at the Institute of Cellular Physiology at UNAM.

== Awards and honors ==
- SNI Nivel III (This award is given by Mexico's National Science Foundation based on a person's publication record and impact.)
- “Mexicanos Notables”. Canal 11. 2009 (This award is given by Mexico's state funded TV channel 11 and is given only to noteworthy Mexicans.)
- Award Ciudad Capital: Heberto Castillo Martínez. Denominación “Thalía Harmony Baillet”, in the area of health. 2008
- Distinción “Mujer Líder 2008”. Consorcio “Mundo Ejecutivo” (Empresarial). 2008
- Sor Juana Inés de la Cruz Recognition UNAM. 2006 (This award is given only to one woman in each school of UNAM and is a prestigious award to recognize women leaders in the university.)
- “Mujer del Año” (Woman of the Year). Patronato Nacional de La Mujer del Año, 2002
- Recognized as the Smartest Woman of Mexico with the “Laureana Wright Award given by the Mexican Society in Geography and Statistics. 2003
- Award for conducting the best basic research in her first University year. Mexico's National Academy of Medicine, 2003
- Recognized as the Woman of the Year by the Rotary Club of the Pedregal, 2003
- UNAM Award, Research in Natural Sciences, 2002
- “Hartley” Award. University of Southampton, UK, 1985
- “Gabino Barreda” Award 1985. UNAM (This prestigious award is given to the student with the highest GPA of each generation at UNAM).
