= Cecilia Bouzat =

Argentine biochemist

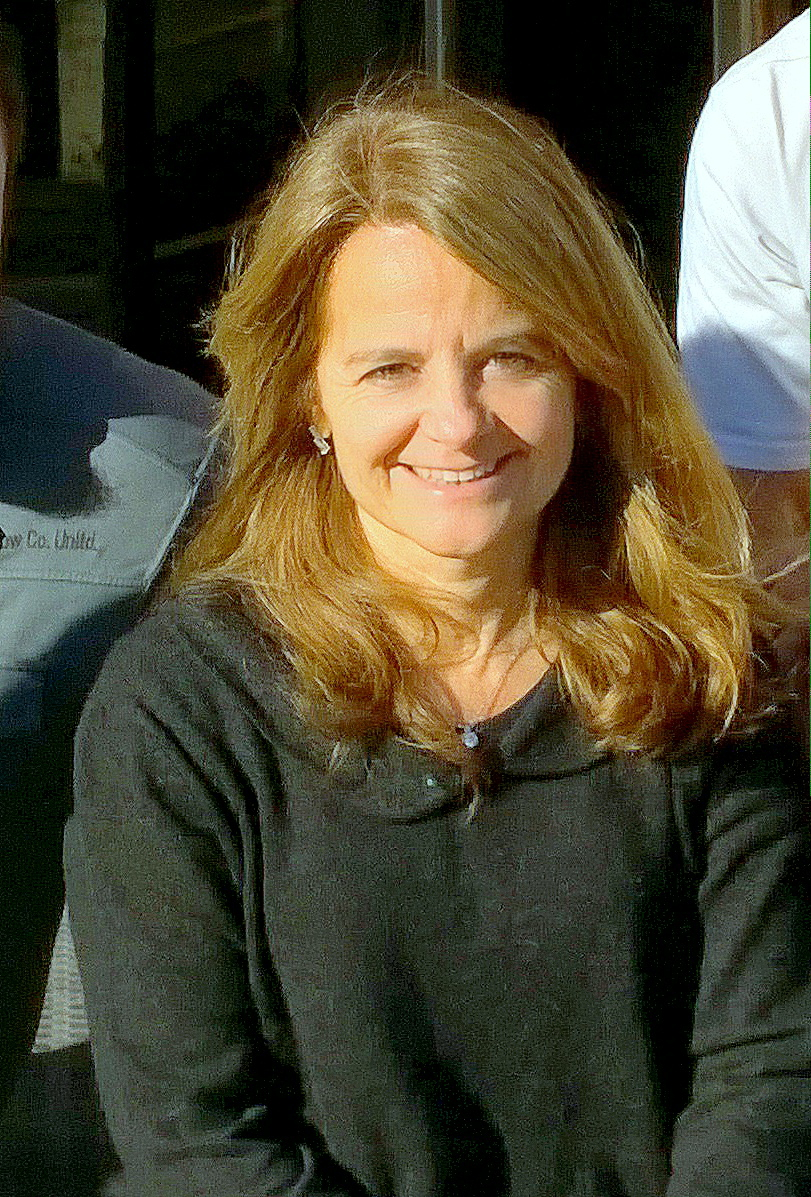
- Bouzat in 2015
- Born: 10 November 1961 (age 64); Bahía Blanca, Argentina
- Education: Universidad Nacional del Sur
- Known for: Study of receptors called Cys-loop, neuronal nicotinic receptors
- Awards: L'Oréal-UNESCO Awards for Women in Science (2014)
- Scientific career
- Fields: Neuroscience
- Workplaces: Universidad Nacional del Sur; Mayo Clinic; California Institute of Technology
- Thesis: (1961)

Cecilia Bouzat (born 10 December 1961) is an Argentine biochemist, who studies neurological disorders. In 2014 she was honored as the Latin American Laureate by the L'Oréal-UNESCO Award for Women in Science. In 2015, she was listed as one of BBC's 100 Women.

== Early life and education ==
Cecilia Bouzat was born on 10 December 1961, in Bahía Blanca, Argentina. As a daughter and granddaughter of doctors, she was the third of six children and became interested in science early on in her education. It was in Bouzat's second or third year of college that she believed she wanted to root her career in the sciences. She received a degree and PhD in Biochemical Sciences at the Universidad Nacional del Sur of Bahía Blanca in Buenos Aires, Argentina. Following the completion of her advanced degrees, Bouzat completed a postdoctorate study in the United States of America at the Mayo Clinic in Rochester, Minnesota, in 1994.

== Research focus ==
Bouzat's research has been focused on the nervous system and how the brain and muscle cells communicate. Her first studies revolved around how Cys-loop receptors are involved in the synapses and enable rapid communications between the neurons and how drugs and compounds may modify the operation of the membrane proteins specific to the nervous system. Alterations to neuronal nicotinic receptors are associated with neurological disorders.

== Career ==
Currently, Bouzat is the principal investigator of the CONICET and deputy director of the Institute of Biochemical Research of White Bay (INIBIBB) in Argentina. She directs the biochemistry research centre and is an assistant professor of pharmacology at the Universidad Nacional del Sur in her hometown of Bahía Blanca. Bouzat is a Research Member of the National Council of Research of Argentina.

== Honors and awards ==
In 2005, Bouzat was a Guggenheim Fellow in Natural Sciences. In 2007, Bouzat had won a research scholarship from the same body who award the L'Oréal-UNESCO Awards for Women in Science. The 2014 award she received recognises five women separated geographically from around the world for their scientific research every year. She was the third Argentine to receive this award. She received the recognition as Latin American laureate from L'Oréal-UNESCO for her continued research and role as a leading female research scientist. The citation mentions "her contribution to our understanding of how brain cells communicate among themselves and with muscles". As a result, she was received and congratulated by the Argentine Minister of Science, Lino Barañao, and the Argentine President Cristina Fernandez de Kirchner.
