= Habiba Bouhamed Chaabouni =

Tunisian academic

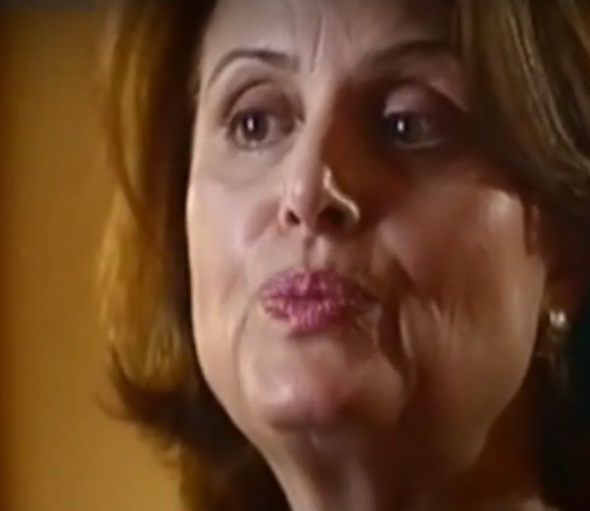
- Born: Tunisia
- Occupation(s): Professor (Tunis University, medical researcher, geneticist)

Habiba Bouhamed Chaabouni is professor of medical genetics at Tunis University.

== Biography ==
In 1981, Chaabouni created the first genetic counselling service, then launched epidemiological studies on consanguinity in northern Tunisia a region where the rate of genetic illnesses, of birth defects and of mortality was particularly elevated. Her studies demonstrated that in this region, a quarter of the marriages involved first cousins whose parents were themselves siblings.

In 1993, she put in place a medical genetics service and consulting practise with the goal of influencing people to request prenatal diagnosis testing. Her work enabled the identification of new genetic mutations involved with different pathologies. She has published over 100 research articles and is author or co-author of 50 peer-reviewed articles.

At the same time, she created a graduate program in genetics at the Faculty of Medicine at Tunis University. In 2006, she was a recipient of the L'Oréal-UNESCO Awards for Women in Science.

She has been a consultant for the World Health Organization (WHO), and the League of Arab Nations. Chaabouni has been active in many international initiatives related to hereditary disease. She has also done work to promote UNESCO's Universal Declaration on the Human Genome and Human Rights. She is a member of the American Society of Human Genetics, and the European Society of Cytogenetics.

In her own words:

I fulfilled a childhood dream of understanding how life started and how all human beings are eternal.
