= Priscilla Baker =

South African professor of analytical chemistry

Priscilla Gloria Lorraine Baker
- Born: Cape Town, South Africa
- Education: University of Cape Town; University of the Western Cape; University of Stellenbosch
- Scientific career
- Fields: Analytical chemistry, Electrochemistry, Nanoscience, Environmental science
- Workplaces: University of the Western Cape

Priscilla Baker is a professor of analytical chemistry at the University of the Western Cape. She is the co-leader of SensorLab, a research platform in electrochemistry that deals with the electrodynamics of materials and sensors. She is an active member of the Academy of Science of South Africa, European Scientific Network for Artificial Muscles (ESNAM) and the Marie Curie International staff exchange scheme (IRSES).

== Career ==
Baker obtained her BSc at the University of Cape Town and majored in Ocean and Atmospheric Science as the only black female in her class. She then completed her National Diploma in Analytical Chemistry, at the Cape Peninsula University of Technology. After getting interested in electrochemistry, she did her BSc Honours (Chemistry) and successfully completed her MSc dissertation (Chemistry) on the evaluation of trace metals in the atmosphere at University of the Western Cape. In 2004, she received her PhD (Chemistry) in the area of novel metal tin oxide composites as anodes for phenol degradation, at the University of Stellenbosch.

In 2014, Baker received the Distinguished Woman Scientist Award in the category of Physical and Engineering Sciences from the Department of Science and Technology's annual Women in Science Awards ceremony.

Baker became the director of the Southern African Systems Analysis Centre (SASAC) in November 2017. Baker served as director of the SASAC programme and member of the programme executive team, from 2017 to 2019. She was instrumental in advancing cross disciplinary research understanding and promoting engagement in systems analysis in South Africa and Africa, through appropriate recruitment strategies, targeted workshops and co-supervision or collaboration from IIASA in Austria, the seat of systems analysis. Through the SASAC programme approximately 60 PhD candidates from South Africa and Africa were recruited into interdisciplinary and trans-boundary research relevant to national, regional, and global needs.

In 2018 Prof Baker was awarded the DSI/NRF South African Research Chair (SARChI) in Analytical Systems and Processes for Priority and Emerging Contaminants (ASPPEC). The South African Research Chairs Initiative (SARChI) was established by the Department of Science and Technology (DST) and the National Research Foundation (NRF) with the aim of attracting and retaining excellence in research and innovation at South African public universities through the establishment of Research Chairs. She is co-director of SensorLab research group and her research focus is on integrated analytical protocols to solve environmental, health and safety monitoring challenges.

In 2020 Baker was appointed as Fellow in Residence at CY Cergy Paris University on the Paris-Seine Initiative for Excellence. During her appointment she established the Senergylab associated international laboratory between SensorLab research group (University of the Western Cape) and the polymer research laboratory LPPI at CY Cergy Paris University, France. The 4 year postgraduate training collaboration is based on sharing resources and expertise, in order to deliver 4 jointly registered (co-tutelle) PhD programmes in addition to joint capacity building programmes through teaching and research exchange visits, for Masters and PhD candidates recruited into the partnership.

Baker has served the international electrochemistry community as deputy chairperson of Electroanalytical Chemistry Division of the International Society of Electrochemistry (ISE, Switzerland) from 2013 to 2016 an as ISE Regional Representative for South Africa and Africa, from 2016 to 2021. Baker is a Fellow of the African Academy of Science, since 2018 and a Fellow of the Royal Society of Chemistry (UK, 2019)
