= Institute for Advanced Study, Tsinghua University =

Research institute of Tsinghua University

- Traditional Chinese: 清華大學高等研究院
- Simplified Chinese: 清华大学高等研究院
Transcriptions
Standard Mandarin
- Hanyu Pinyin: Qīnghuá Dàxué Gāoděng Yánjiùyuàn

The Institute for Advanced Study, Tsinghua University (CASTU; Chinese: 清华大学高等研究院; pinyin: Qīnghuá Dàxué Gāoděng Yánjiū Yuàn) is a research institute established in Beijing in 1997. Modelled after the Princeton-based Institute for Advanced Study, albeit in a university setting, it is engaged in theoretical studies in physics, computer science and biology. Its honorary director is the Nobel Laureate professor Chen Ning Yang, who has provided guidance and support to CASTU since its inception, and current director is professor Gu Binglin.
