= List of women scientists in the 21st century =

Women in science from 2001 to 2100 A.D

This is a list of notable women scientists active in the 21st century.

== Albania ==
- Mimoza Hafizi (born 1962), Albanian physicist
- Laura Mersini-Houghton, cosmology and theoretical physicist
- Afërdita Veveçka Priftaj (1948–2017), Albanian physicist

== Algeria ==
- Yasmine Amhis (born 1982), French-Algerian physicist

== Andorra ==
- Magda Marquet (born 1958), Andorran biotechnologist

== Argentina ==
- Sonia Álvarez Leguizamón (born 1954), urban anthropologist studying poverty
- Zulma Brandoni de Gasparini (born 1944), Argentine paleontologist and zoologist
- Constanza Ceruti (born 1973), Argentine archaeologist and anthropologist
- Rachel Chan (graduated 1988), led group of research scientists to create more drought resistant seed in Argentina
- Perla Fuscaldo (born 1941), Argentine egyptologist

== Armenia ==
- Vandika Ervandovna Avetisyan (born 1928), botanist and mycologist; major contributor to knowledge of the flora of her native Armenia
- Ninet Sinaii, epidemiologist

== Australia ==
- Carol Armour (fl. 2006), medical researcher specializing in asthma
- Anne Astin (graduated 1976), biochemist active in dairy development
- Katherine Belov (born 1973), Australian geneticist, Tasmanian devil cancer researcher
- Phyllis Butow (fl. 2010s), medical researcher specializing in psycho.oncolocgy
- Clara Chow (fl. 2020), medical researcher specializing in cardiovascular disease
- Suzanne Cory (born 1942), Australian molecular biologist
- Donna Cross (fl. 2011), medical researcher specializing in child heath
- Hannah Dahlen (fl. 2008), medical researcher specializing in midwifery
- Jean Finnegan, Australian scientist, researches flowering processes and epigenetic regulation in plants
- Jane Hall (fl. 2016). health economist
- Carolyn Geczy (fl. 2005), medical researcher in immunology
- Bronwyn Hemsley (fl. 2008), medical researcher specializing in speech pathology
- Camille Goldstone-Henry, Australian businesswoman and wildlife scientist
- Felice Jacka (fl. 2017), medical researcher specializing in nutritional psychiatry
- Cheryl Jones (fl 1994), medical researcher specializing in peaediatroc infectious diseases
- Gisela Kaplan, ornithologist and primatologist noted for her research in animal cognition, communication and vocal behaviour of primates and specifically native Australian birds
- Kate Leslie (born 1962), medical researcher specializing in anaesthesia
- Lyn March (fl. 2004), medical researcher specializing in inflammatory arthritis
- Naomi McClure-Griffiths (born 1975), American-Australian astrophysicist. Discovered a new arm of the Milky Way galaxy
- Michelle Lincoln (fl. 1997), medical researcher specializing in health service delivery in rural communities
- Jessica Melbourne-Thomas (born 1981), marine ecologist and ecosystem modeller with the Australian Antarctic Division
- Sue O'Connor Australian archaeologist, discovered the world's oldest fish hooks which were found in an adult female's grave
- Vanessa Pirotta (fl. 2020s), wildlife scientist employing innovative technologies
- Carol Pollock (fl. 2021), medical researcher specializing in kidney health
- Annamma Dorai Raj (1959–2024), rheumatologist
- Helen Reddel (fl. 2000), researcher specializing in respiratory medicine
- Lesley J Rogers (born 1943), Australian ethologist and neuroscientist, expert in brain laterality
- Moninya Roughan (born 1974), physical oceanographer, expert in the dynamics and warming of the East Australian Current
- Una M. Ryan (born 1966), patented DNA test identifying protozoan parasite Cryptosporidium
- Cathie Sherrington (fl. 2010), geriatrician specializing in fall prevention
- Justine R. Smith (fl. 2015), ophthalmic surgeon specializing in vision research
- Helen Alma Newton Turner (1908–1995), geneticist and statistician, expert on sheep genetics
- Carden Wallace (fl. 1970–), marine biologist and museum director, expert on corals
- Leonie Walsh, first Lead Scientist of Victoria
- Stephanie Watson (fl. 2021), medical researcher specializing in ophthalmology
- Sarah Wayland (fl. 2005), social worker and health researcher
- Rachel Webster (born 1951), astrophysicist, educator
- Mary E. White (1926–2018), paleobotanist

== Austria ==
- Elisabeth Binder (graduated 1995), Austrian neuroscientist specializing in anxiety disorders
- Claire F. Gmachl (born 1967), Austrian-born American electrical engineer, educator
- Andrea Grill (born 1975), Austrian biologist
- Elisabeth Huber-Sannwald, Austrian researcher specializing in ecosystem ecology
- Lisa Kaltenegger (born 1977), Austrian astronomer, educator
- Christine Mannhalter (born 1948), molecular biologist
- Elisabeth Ruttkay (1926–2009), Austrian Neolithic and Bronze Age archaeologist
- Eva Schönbeck-Temesy (1930–2011), Hungarian-born Austrian botanist

== Barbados ==
- Velma Scantlebury (born 1955), first woman of African descent to become a transplant surgeon in the U.S.

== Belgium ==
- Ingrid Daubechies (born 1954), Belgian physicist and mathematician
- Véronique Dehant (born 1959), geodesist and geophysicist
- Véronique Gouverneur (born 1964), chemist, educator, specializing in organic fluorine compounds
- Yaël Nazé (born 1976), Belgian astrophysicist specializing in massive stars

== Bolivia ==
- Sonia Alconini (born 1965), Bolivian archaeologist of the Formative Period of the Lake Titicaca basin
- Kathrin Barboza Marquez (born 1983), Bolivian biologist specializing in bat research

== Brazil ==
- Mariza Corrêa (1945–2016), anthropologist, sociologist
- Livia Eberlin analytical chemist, co-inventor of the MassSpec pen
- Fátima Ferreira (born 1959), biologist, physician, educator, now vice-rector at the University of Salzburg specializing in molecular allergology
- Dorath Pinto Uchôa (1947–2014), archaeologist
- Lúcia Mendonça Previato (born 1949), biologist
- Alba Zaluar (1942–2019), anthropologist specializing in urban anthropology
- Mayana Zatz (born 1947), molecular biologist and geneticist

== Cameroon ==
* Georgette D. Kanmogne, Cameroonian American geneticist and molecular virologist

== Canada ==
- Karen Bailey, plant pathology
- Karen Beauchemin (born 1956), ruminant nutrition research
- Roberta Bondar (born 1945), neurologist, astronaut, educator
- Kirsten Bos, physical anthropologist, molecular paleopathologist
- Lindsay Cahill, chemist
- Juliet Daniel (fl. from 2001), focus on cancer biology
- Martine Dorais, plant physiology, organic horticulture
- Laura Ferrarese, astronomer
- Roberta Gilchrist (born 1965), Canadian archaeologist specializing in medieval Britain
- Sheena Josselyn, Canadian neuroscientist
- Francesca M. Kerton, chemist
- Julia Levy (1934–2024), microbiologist, immunologist, entrepreneur
- Mary MacArthur (1904–1959), botanist, cytologist
- Deborah Martin-Downs, aquatic biologist, ecologist
- Diane Massam, linguist
- Natalie Panek, mechanical engineer and space scientist
- Elizabeth Pattey, agricultural meteorologist
- Heather Pringle, writer on archaeology
- Kathleen I. Pritchard, oncologist, breast cancer researcher and noted as one of Reuter's most cited scientists
- Line Rochefort, Canadian ecologist
- Francine Saillant (born 1953), anthropologist, writer
- Sandra Schmid (born 1958), cell biologist
- Karen Schwartzkopf-Genswein, animal ethologist
- Sara Seager (born 1971), Canadian-American astronomer and planetary scientist
- Felicitas Svejda (1920–2016), horticulturalist
- Sandra Witelson, neuroscientist
- Jeanny Yao, biochemist and technology entrepreneur
- Rachel Zimmerman (born 1972), Canadian-born space scientist

== Chile ==
- Ligia Gargallo, chemist, educator
- Paula Jofré (born 1982), astronomer and astrophysicist
- María Teresa Ruiz, (born 1946) astronomer
- Veronica Vallejos, marine biologist and Antarctic researcher
- Ana Vásquez-Bronfman (1931–2009), Chilean-French sociologist

== China ==
- Margaret Chan (born 1947), Chinese (Hong Kong), health specialist, director-general of the World Health Organization
- Zeng Rong, biochemist specializing in proteins
- Jian Xu, CTO at IBM, software engineer
- Zhao Yufen (born 1948), chemical engineer
- Qian Zhengying (1923–2022), Chinese hydrologist and politician
- Lü Zhi (born 1965), giant panda expert and conservationist
- Tu Youyou (born 1930), Chinese pharmaceutical chemist and malariologist

== Colombia ==
- Diana Marcela Bolaños Rodriguez (born 1981), marine biologist studying flat worms and stem cell regeneration
- Ana Maria Rey (born 1976/1977), theoretical physicist
- María del Pilar Jiménez Alzate, medical biological researcher

== Croatia ==
- Snježana Kordić (born 1964), linguist
- Nina Marković, physicist and professor

== Cuba ==
- Herminia Ibarra, economist

== Czech Republic ==
- Eva Syková (born 1944), neuroscientist researching spinal cord injury

== Democratic Republic of the Congo ==
- Raïssa Malu, physicist, educator and politician

== Denmark ==
- Anja Cetti Andersen (born 1965), astronomer, astrophysicist
- Lene Hau (born 1959), physicist
- Sine Larsen (1943–2025), chemist and crystallographer
- Signe Normand (born 1979), biologist, ecologist, educator

== Dominican Republic ==
- Idelisa Bonnelly (1931–2022), marine biologist who created first sanctuary in the North Atlantic for humpback whales
- Aída Mencía Ripley, clinical psychologist

== Estonia ==
- Lili Milani (born 1981), Estonian geneticist

== Finland ==
- Tuija I. Pulkkinen (born 1962), Finnish space scientist

== France ==
- Aurore Avarguès-Weber (born 1983), cognitive neuroscientist
- Hélène Bergès (born 1966), director of the Plant Genomic Resources Center (CNRGV), plant geneticist
- Mireille Bousquet-Mélou (born 1967), mathematician
- Rut Carballido Lopez, Spanish-born microbiologist and research director in Paris
- Merieme Chadid (born 1969), astronomer, explorer and astrophysicist
- Françoise Combes (born 1952), astrophysicist
- Anne Dejean-Assémat (born 1957), biologist researching liver cancer
- Rose Dieng-Kuntz (1956–2008), Senegalese born French computer scientist specialising in artificial intelligence, first African woman to enroll in the École polytechnique.
- Catherine Feuillet (born 1965), French molecular biologist who was the first scientist to map the wheat chromosome 3B
- Françoise Gasse (1942–2014), paleobiologist specializing in lacustrine sediments
- Laurence Lanfumey (born 1954), French neuroscientist
- Dominique Langevin (born 1947), physical chemist
- Claudine Rinner (born 1965), amateur astronomer
- Martine Tabeaud (born in 1951) French geographer, specialist in climatology
- Fabiola Terzi (born 1961), physician-scientist

== Germany ==
- Andrea Ablasser (born 1983), German immunologist working in Switzerland
- Katrin Amunts (born 1962), prominent neuroscientist involved in brain mapping
- Ulrike Beisiegel (born 1952), German biochemist, researcher of liver fats and first female president of the University of Göttingen
- Sibylle Günter (born 1964), theoretical physicist researching tokamak plasmas
- Hanna von Hoerner (1942–2014), astrophysicist
- Eva-Maria Neher (born 1950), German biochemist, microbiologist
- Nina Papavasiliou, immunologist
- Elisabeth Piirainen (1943–2017), philologist
- Ilme Schlichting (born 1960), biophysicist
- Brigitte Voit (born 1963), chemist

== Greece ==
- Lydia Kravraki, computer scientist, professor at Rice

== Guadeloupe ==
- Dany Bébel-Gisler (1935–2003), Guadeloupean sociolinguist and ethnographer

== Hungary ==
- Katalin Balázsi (born 1978), material scientist researching nanomaterials and ceramics
- Katalin Karikó (born 1955), biochemist researching mRNA vaccines, 2023 Nobel Prize in Physiology or Medicine

== India ==
- Joyanti Chutia (born 1948), work spans both centuries, focusing on physics
- Seetha Coleman-Kammula (born 1950), Indian chemist and plastics designer, turned environmentalist
- Paramjit Khurana (born 1956), Indian biologist specializing in plant biotechnology
- Shobhana Narasimhan (graduated 1983), Indian physicist, professor of theoretical sciences in Bangalore
- Priyamvada Natarajan (graduated 1993), Indian-born American astronomer, educator
- Manju Ray (1947–2021), Indian biochemist developing anticancer drugs
- Seema Bhatnagar (born 1971), Indian scientist, working in the field of anticancer drug discovery

== Indonesia ==
- Adi Utarini (born 1965), Indonesian public health researcher who works on disease control of dengue fever
- Elizabeth A. Widjaja (born 1951), Indonesian researcher of bamboo taxonomy
- Karlina Leksono Supelli (born 1958), Indonesian philosopher and astronomer
- Pratiwi Sudarmono (born 1952), Indonesian professor of microbiology at the University of Indonesia
- Rose Amal (born 1965), Indonesian-Australian chemical engineer
- Soejatmi Dransfield (born 1939), Indonesia-born British plant taxonomist specializing in bamboos
- Tri Mumpuni (born 1964), Indonesian independent researcher, social entrepreneur, philanthropist, social activist, and micro-hydropower inventor
- Ritu Karidhal – Indian space scientist and Deputy Operations Director of India’s Mars Orbiter Mission (Mangalyaan), also known as the "Rocket Woman of India".

== Iran ==
- Anousheh Ansari (born 1966), Iranian-American engineer and co-founder and chairwoman of Prodea Systems
- Mina J. Bissell, Iranian-American biologist known for her research on breast cancer
- Maryam Mirzakhani (1977–2017), Iranian-American mathematician and a professor of mathematics at Stanford University
- Roxana Moslehi, genetic epidemiologist, researching cancer and cancer precursors
- Pardis C. Sabeti (born 1975), Iranian-American computational biologist, medical geneticist and evolutionary geneticist
- Reihaneh Safavi-Naini, AITF Strategic Chair in Information Security at the University of Calgary, Canada
- Ālenush Teriān (1920–2011), Iranian-Armenian astronomer and physicist and is called 'Mother of Modern Iranian Astronomy'
- Saba Valadkhan (born 1974), Tehran Education: Columbia University an Iranian American biomedical scientist, and an Assistant Professor and RNA researcher at Case Western Reserve University

== Iraq ==
- Lihadh Al-Gazali (born 1950), geneticist, established a registry for congenital disorders in the United Arab Emirates

== Israel ==
- Rachel Mamlok-Naaman, Israeli chemist
- Osnat Penn (born 1981), Israeli computational biologist
- Ada Yonath (1939–2026), Israeli crystallographer
- Idit Zehavi (born 1969), Israeli astrophysicist

== Italy ==
- Maria Abbracchio (born 1956), Italian pharmacologist who works with purinergic receptors and identified GPR17; on Reuter's most cited list since 2006
- Daria Guidetti (born 1978), astrophysicist with the INAF
- Elisa Molinari, Italian physicist working on computational materials science and nanotechnologies, recognized "Fellow" of the American Physical Society
- Chiara Nappi (born 1951), Italian particle physicist active in the US
- Elisa Oricchio (born 1979), discovered that the protein EphA7 activates the tumor suppressor gene for patients with follicular lymphoma
- Irene Tamborra, Italian particle astrophysicist

== Latvia ==
- Emīlija Gudriniece (1920–2004), Latvian chemist and academic

== Luxembourg ==
- Christiane Linster (born 1962), behavioral neuroscientist

== Madagascar ==
- Julie Hanta Razafimanahaka, conservation biologist

== Morocco ==
- Merieme Chadid (born 1969), astronomer, explorer, and astrophysicist
- Rajaâ Cherkaoui El Moursli (born 1954), known for her contribution to the proof of existence for the Higgs Boson

== Netherlands ==
- Corinne Hofman (born 1959), Dutch archaeologist

== New Zealand ==
- Margaret Brimble (born 1961), chemist, researching shellfish toxins
- Gillian Wratt (born 1954), botanist and Antarctic researcher

== Nigeria ==
- Taiwo Olayemi Elufioye, pharmacologist
- Francisca Oboh Ikuenobe (born 1962), geologist specializing in palynology and sedimentology
- Eucharia Oluchi Nwaichi, environmental biochemist, Oréal-Unesco award in 2013
- Grace Oladunni Taylor (1937–2025), Nigerian chemist, 2nd woman inducted into the Nigerian Academy of Science
- Omowunmi Sadik (born 1964), chemist, educator
- Margaret Adebisi Sowunmi (born 1939), botanist and environmental archaeologist
- Felicity Okpete Ovai (born 1961), engineer, civil servant, politician

== Norway ==
- Tine Jensen (born 1957), psychologist specializing in psychological trauma

== Peru ==
- Virginia Vargas (born 1945), sociologist, writer

== Portugal ==
- Mónica Bettencourt-Dias (born 1974), biochemist and microbiologist
- Maria Manuel Mota (born 1971), malariologist and executive director of the Instituto de Medicina Molecular, Lisbon

== Russia ==
- Eugenia Kumacheva, Russian-born chemist, since 1995 teaching in Canada
- Galina Savelyeva (1928–2022), gynaecologist

== Rwanda ==
- Dr. Pascasie Nyirahabimana, physicist and physics education researcher, as well as the Head of the Department of Mathematics, Science, and Physical Education at the University of Rwanda College of Education (UR-CE)

== Saudi Arabia ==
- Suhad Bahajri (graduated 1975), chemist
- Samira Islam (active since 1971), pharmacologist, educator

== Serbia ==
- Nataša Pavlović (graduated 1996), mathematician

== Singapore ==
- Gloria Lim (1930–2022), Singaporean mycologist, first woman Dean of the University of Singapore
- Lisa Ng, virologist

== South Africa ==
- Renée Hložek (born 1983), cosmologist and professor of physics
- Valerie Mizrahi (born 1958), molecular biologist
- Tebello Nyokong (born 1951), South African chemist and cancer researcher
- Jennifer Thomson (born 1947), microbiologist

== Spain ==
- Margarita Salas (1938–2019), biochemist, author
- Cari Borrás, medical physicist
- Mercedes Fernández-Martorell (born 1948), anthropologist, educator
- María José García Borge (born 1956), nuclear physicist
- Eva Poveda (born 1975), Spanish virologist
- Carme Torras (born 1956), computer scientist specialising in robotics
- Carmen Vela (born 1955), microbiologist, ministerial official, writer

== South Korea ==
- Ahn In-Young, Antarctic researcher and benthic ecologist
- Chang Kyongae, (born 1946), astrophysicist
- Cho Yoon-kyoung, interdisciplinary researcher
- Choi Sookyung, particle physicist
- Chung Kwang Hwa (born 1948), physicist and president of the Korea Research Institute of Standards and Science, Korea Basic Science Institute, and Korean Vacuum Society
- Jun Mikyoung, statistician
- Kim Eun-Ah (born 1975), condensed matter physicist
- Kim Ju-Lee (born 1969), mathematician, educator, now in the United States
- Kim V. Narry (born 1969), biochemist and microbiologist
- Lee Hong Kum, Antarctic researcher
- Lee Jung-Min, medical oncologist and physician-scientist
- Lim Hyesook (born 1963), electronics engineer, served as Minister of Science and ICT
- Oh Hee, (born 1969), mathematician
- Paik Hanhee, experimental quantum computing researcher
- Park So-Jung (born 1972), chemist
- Park Sukyung (born 1973), mechanical engineer, served as Science and Technology Advisor to President Moon Jae-in from 2020 to 2022
- Pi So-Young (born 1946), physicist
- Seo Eun-Suk (born 1971), astrophysicist
- Soh Chunghee Sarah, sociocultural anthropologist
- Yu Myeong-Hee (born 1954), South Korean microbiologist

== Switzerland ==
- Silvia Arber (born 1968), neuroscientist
- Anita Studer (1944–2025), ornithologist and environmentalist

== Taiwan ==
- Yu-Ju Chen, proteogenomics researcher
- Chung-Pei Ma (born 1966), astrophysicist, now in the United States

== Tanzania ==
- Aneth David, biotechnologist
- Agness Gidna, paleontologist

== Trinidad and Tobago ==
- Michelle Antoine, neuroscientist
- Jo-Anne Sewlal (1979–2020), arachnologist

== Turkey ==
- Ayşe Erzan (born 1949), theoretical physicist

== Ukraine ==
- Svitlana Mayboroda (born 1981), mathematician, educator, researching harmonic analysis and partial differential equations
- Maryna Viazovska (born 1984), Ukrainian mathematician known for her work in sphere packing

== United Kingdom ==
- Denise P. Barlow (1950–2017), British geneticist
- Gillian Bates (born 1956), British botanist, educator, Fellow of the Royal Society (2007)
- Alex Bayliss, British archaeologist
- Sue Black (born 1962), British computer scientist
- Jocelyn Bell Burnell (born 1943), astrophysicist who discovered radio pulsars
- Myriam Charpentier, British molecular biologist and researcher of nuclear calcium signalling
- Mandy Chessell (born c.1965), British computer scientist with IBM
- Jenny Clack (1947–2020), paleontologist, expert on the "fish to tetrapod" evolutionary transition
- A. Catrina Coleman (born 1956), Scottish electrical engineer, educator
- Bryony Coles (born 1946), British prehistoric archaeologist
- Janet Darbyshire, British epidemiologist, CBE (2010)
- Annette Dolphin (born 1951), British pharmacologist
- Shahina Farid, British archaeologist, best known for her work as Field Director and Project Coordinator at the Neolithic site of Çatalhöyük in Turkey
- Maria Fitzgerald (born 1953), British neuroscientist
- Jane Goodall (1934–2025), British primatologist and anthropologist
- Monica Grady (born 1958), British space scientist
- Emily Grossman (born 1978), British cancer researcher and science popularist
- Helena Hamerow (born 1961), British archeologist and specialist in medieval archaeology
- Joanne Johnson (born 1977), geologist, Antarctic scientist
- Tara Keck (born 1978), American-British neuroscientist
- Rachel McKendry (born 1973), chemist and digital public health pioneer
- Linda McDowell (born 1949), British geographer, writer
- Jane E. Parker (born 1960), British botanist who researches the immune responses of plants
- Emma Parmee, British chemist who was one of the leads in the discovery and development of sitagliptin
- Sarah Pett, British medical researcher, immunopathologist, and COVID-19 researcher
- Tracey Reynolds (born 1970s), British sociologist
- Margaret Stanley, British virologist, OBE (2004)
- Jean Thomas (born 1942), Welsh biochemist, educator
- Miriam Tildesley (1883–1979), English anthropologist
- Karen Vousden (born 1957), British medical researcher
- Christine Williams (graduated 1973), British nutritionist, educator

== United States ==
=== Astronomy ===
- Carolyn Porco (born 1953), American planetary scientist
- Debra Elmegreen (born 1952), astronomer, educator
- Jill Tarter (born 1944), American astronomer, educator
- Joy Crisp (graduated 1979), American planetary scientist
- Linda Spilker (born 1955), American planetary scientist
- Lucy-Ann McFadden (born 1952), astronomer
- Maria Zuber (born 1958), American planetary scientist
- Martha P. Haynes (born 1951), American astronomer specializing in radio astronomy
- Pamela Gay (born 1973), American astronomer
- Rachel Zimmerman (born 1972), Canadian-born space scientist
- Sandra Faber (born 1944), American professor of astronomy
- Amanda Bosh (fl 1990s), American observational astronomer
- Luisa Rebull (fl 2010s), American astrophysicist

=== Other fields of study ===
- Athena Aktipis (born c.1981), American professor of evolutionary biology and psychology
- Alice Alldredge (born 1949), American oceanographer and researcher of marine snow, discover of Transparent Exopolymer Particles (TEP) and demersal zooplankton
- Ilkay Altintas (born 1977), Turkish-American supercomputing and high performance computing research scientist
- Lera Boroditsky (born c.1976), Belarusian-American cognitive scientist
- Stephanie Burns (born 1955), organosilicon chemist, business executive
- L. Jean Camp (graduated 1988), computer security expert, professor
- Lu Chen (born 1972), Chinese-born American neuroscientist
- Anne Churchland, American neuroscientist
- Sylvia Earle (born 1935), marine biologist, explorer, author, and lecturer
- Deborah Estrin (born 1959), American computer scientist, educator
- Katherine Freese (born 1957), theoretical astrophysicist, American professor of physics
- Elizabeth Gershoff, American professor of human development and family sciences
- Candace S. Greene (graduated 1976), American anthropologist, National Museum of Natural History
- Jane Grimwood, microbiologist, from 2000 worked on the Human Genome Project at Stanford
- Lisa Gunaydin, neuroscientist and professor
- Gail Hanson (born 1947), American experimental particle physicist, educator
- Gabriele C. Hegerl (born 1962), climatologist researching natural variability and attribution of climate change
- Patricia Hersh (born 1973), mathematician, educator, researching algebraic and topological combinatorics
- Valerie Horsley, American biologist
- Aletha C. Huston, American professor of child development
- Shirley Ann Jackson (born 1946), American nuclear physicist
- Alice K. Jacobs, American cardiologist, president of the American Heart Association (2004)
- Deborah Jacobvitz, American ecologist
- Karen C. Johnson (born 1955), American physician and clinical trials specialist who is one of Reuter's most cited scientists
- Rosemary Joyce (born 1956), American archaeologist who uncovered chocolate's archaeological record and studies Honduran pre-history
- Renata Kallosh (born 1943), Russian-born American theoretical physicist, educator
- Dina Katabi (born 1970), professor of electrical engineering and computer science at MIT
- Cynthia Keppel, nuclear physicist
- Ann Kiessling (born 1942), American reproductive biologist, educator
- Maria Kovacs, psychologist, educator
- Cynthia Larive, American bioanalytical chemist
- Emily Levesque (born 1984), American astrophysicist
- J. Virginia Lincoln (1915–2003), physicist
- Mariangela Lisanti (born 1983), American theoretical physicist
- Anna Suk-Fong Lok, Chinese/American hepatologist, wrote WHO and AASLD guidelines for liver disease in emerging countries
- Catherine A. Lozupone (born 1975), American microbiologist, working on the gut microbiome, who developed the UniFrac algorithm
- Annie Luetkemeyer (born 1972), American physician and medical COVID-19 researcher
- Silvia Maciá (born 1972), marine biologist
- Carolyn M. Mazure (born 1949), medical researcher
- Sally McBrearty (1949–2023), American palaeoanthropologist and Palaeolithic archaeologist
- Lauren Meyers, American professor of integrative biology
- Jill Mikucki (graduated 1996), microbiologist, Antarctic researcher
- Barbara Haviland Minor, chemical engineer
- Marianne V. Moore (graduated 1975), aquatic ecologist
- Yolanda T. Moses (born 1946), anthropologist, educator
- Catherine J. Murphy (born 1964), American chemist
- Alison Murray (scientist) (graduated 1989), biochemist, Antarctic researcher
- Elizabeth Nance, American chemical engineer
- Anna Nagurney (active since 1996), Ukrainian-American mathematician specializing in operations management
- Ann Nardulli (1948–2018), American endocrinologist
- Elly Nedivi, American neuroscientist
- Ann Nelson (1958–2019), American particle physicist
- Anne B. Newman (born 1955), US geriatrics and gerontology expert
- Lina Nilsson, biomedical engineering
- Karen Oberhauser (born 1956), conservation biologist working with monarch butterflies
- Nataša Pavlović, psychologist
- E. Gail de Planque (1944–2010), nuclear physicist specializing in environmental radiation
- Eva J. Pell (born 1948), American biologist, plant pathologist
- Helen Quinn (born 1943), Australian-born American particle physicist
- Lisa Randall (born 1962), American particle physicist, educator
- Rebecca Richards-Kortum (born 1964), American bioengineer, professor at Rice
- Geraldine L. Richmond (born 1953), American physical chemist, professor at University of Oregon, previous president of the American Association for the Advancement of Science
- Karin Rodland (born 1949), cancer cell biologist; Fellow of the American Association for the Advancement of Science; Laboratory Fellow of the U.S. Pacific Northwest National Laboratory
- Una Ryan, (born 1941), Malaysian born-American, heart disease researcher, biotech vaccine and diagnostics maker/marketer
- Omowunmi Sadik (born 1964), Nigerian-born chemist, Bioanalytical chemistry
- Linda Saif (graduated 1969), American microbial scientist, researching virology and immunology
- Sandra Saouaf, American immunologist researching autoimmune disease
- Velma Scantlebury – see Barbados
- Hazel Schmoll (1890–1990), American botanist
- Christine Siddoway (born 1961), Antarctic geologist
- H. Catherine W. Skinner (1931–2025), American geologist and mineralogist
- Caroline M. Solomon, deaf oceanographer and winner of the 2017 Ramón Margalef Award for Excellence in Education
- Carsen Stringer, American computational neuroscientist
- Sharon Stocker, known for discovery of Griffin Warrior Tomb
- Elizabeth C. Theil (graduated 1962), research into iron deficiency anemia
- Sabrina Thompson (born 1985), American aerospace engineer and founder of fashion brand Girl in Space Club
- Krystal Tsosie, geneticist and bioethicist known for promoting Indigenous data sovereignty and studying genetics within Indigenous communities
- Kay Tye (born c. 1981), American neuroscientist
- Gina G. Turrigiano, American neuroscientist
- Lydia Villa-Komaroff (born 1947), American molecular biologist
- Elisabeth Vrba (1942–2025), American paleontologist
- Nora Volkow (born 1956), Mexican-American psychiatrist
- Catherine Colello Walker, glaciologist at Woods Hole Oceanographic Institute
- Elizabeth M. Ward, American epidemiologist and head of the Epidemiology and Surveillance Research Department of the American Cancer Society
- Rachel Ward, American mathematician
- Christina Warinner, American anthropologist best known for her research on ancient microbiomes
- Petra Wilder-Smith (born 1958), American dentistry and cancer researcher
- Phyllis Wise (graduated 1967), American biologist, educator
- Catherine G. Wolf (1947–2018), American psychologist specializing in human-computer interaction
- Kakani Katija Young (born 1983), American bioengineer
- Hua Eleanor Yu, cancer researcher
- Amy Proal (fl 2010x), American microbiologist

== Venezuela ==
- Mayly Sánchez (born 1972), astrophysicist studying neutrinos, awarded the US PECASE Prize in 2011

== Vietnam ==
- Phạm Thị Trân Châu (born 1938), biochemist
- Hoang Thi Than (born 1944), Vietnamese geological engineer and archaeologist

== Zambia ==
- Nsofwa Petronella Sampa, psychological counselor and HIV activist

== Zimbabwe ==
- Idah Sithole-Niang (born 1957), biochemist focusing on cowpea production and disease

== See also ==
- 21st-century women scientists
- Lists of women scientists
- Timeline of women in science
- Women scientists by century
