= Kammula =

Kammula is a Telugu surname. Notable people with the surname include:

- Sekhar Kammula (born 1972), Indian film director
- Seetha Coleman-Kammula (fl. from 1978), Indian chemist
