= Sherrington (disambiguation) =

Sherrington is a village and parish in Wiltshire, England.

Sherrington may also refer to:

== Places ==
- Saint-Patrice-de-Sherrington, Quebec, Canada
- Sherrington (crater), a small impact crater on the far side of the Moon

== People ==
- Billy Sherrington (1890–1977), English football manager
- Bob Sherrington (1902–1966), Australian politician
- Cathie Sherrington, Australian physiotherapist and health ageing researcher
- Charles Scott Sherrington (1857–1952), English medical scientist, Nobel prize winner
  - Sherrington's law of reciprocal innervation in muscle
  - Vulpian–Heidenhain–Sherrington phenomenon in skeletal muscle
- Chris Sherrington (born 1983), English judo practitioner
- David Sherrington (disambiguation), several people
- Georgina Sherrington (born 1985), English actress
- John Sherrington (born 1958), Auxiliary Bishop of Westminster, England

== See also ==
- Sherington, village and parish in Buckinghamshire, England
