= Mar Virado (island) =

Island in Brazil

Native name: Ilha de Mar Virado
- Interactive map of Mar Virado

Geography
- Coordinates: 23.566°S 45.156°W

Administration
- Brazil
- State: São Paulo
- Municipality: Ubatuba

Additional information
- Time zone: FNT (UTC-2)
  - Summer (DST): AMST (UTC-3)

Mar Virado Island or Ilha do Mar Virado is an island of Brazil. It is located to the west of Anchieta Island in the state of São Paulo, in the southeastern part of the country, 900 km south of Brasília.

== See also ==
- Dorath Pinto Uchôa
