= Grimwood =

Grimwood is a surname. Notable people with the surname include:

- Alfred Grimwood (1905–1986), English cricketer
- Jane Grimwood, British microbiologist
- John Grimwood (1898–1977), English footballer
- Jon Courtenay Grimwood (born 1953), science fiction and fantasy author
- Keith Grimwood, member of the band Trout Fishing in America
- Ken Grimwood (1944–2003), American author
- Liam Grimwood, English archer
- Trevor Grimwood (born 1948), Australian footballer

== Fictional characters ==
- DS Grimwood, a character in the soap opera EastEnders

== See also ==
- Grimwood's longclaw, Congolese bird
