= Cari Borrás =

Spanish medical physicist

- Born: Caridad Borrás; Barcelona, Spain
- Education: University of Barcelona
- Known for: Medical physics; radiation protection
- Awards: AAPM Edith H Quimby Lifetime Achievement Award (2013)
- Scientific career
- Fields: Medical physics
- Workplaces: West Coast Cancer Foundation; Pan American Health Organization
- Doctoral advisor: Robert O. Gorson and Robert L. Brent

Caridad Borrás is a Spanish medical physicist. Her career started in 1964 at the Santa Creu i Sant Pau Hospital in Barcelona. From 1988 to 2000, she was Regional Advisor of the Radiological Health Program and, from 2000 to 2002, Coordinator of Essential Drugs and Technology at the Pan American Health Organization in Washington D.C.

Borrás has actively promoted among health administrators in Latin American and Caribbean countries that medical physicists and radiation protection experts are an essential requirement to achieve high-quality radiation oncology and diagnostic imaging procedures. She has received several awards, including the Edith H. Quimby Lifetime Achievement Award from American Association of Physicists in Medicine.

== Early life and education ==
Caridad Borrás grew up in Barcelona, Spain and did her undergraduate and doctorate studies in Physics at the University of Barcelona, where she obtained the degrees in 1964 and 1974. A Fulbright scholarship financed a stay at Thomas Jefferson University in Philadelphia, Pennsylvania, during which she did doctoral research under the direction of Robert O. Gorson and Robert L. Brent. Her primary interest had been radiation biology as she thought that physics, through radiation, could explain the principles of life.

After receiving her Doctor of Sciences Degree she returned to the United States and took a position at the West Coast Cancer Foundation in San Francisco, California, where she set up quality control and quality assurance programs in diagnostic radiology in several hospitals, something not common for medical physicists in those days.

She got involved in diagnostic radiology committees and AAPM task groups, later developing international cooperation with Latin America. Representing the AAPM International Affairs Committee in 1984 she promoted the formation of ALFIM, the Latin American Federation of Medical Physics.

Since 1988 she directed the Radiological Health Program of the Pan American Health Organization (PAHO) and World Health Organization (WHO) in the Washington DC area. She served as advisor to Latin American Health Ministers and professional societies on the need for medical physics and radiological protection standards to reach high-quality radiation oncology and diagnostic imaging services.

Under her representation PAHO took active part as one of the organizations that prepared the International Basic Safety Standards for Protection Against Ionizing Radiation and for the Safety of Radiation Sources, a document endorsed by FAO, IAEA, ILO, NEA of the OECD, PAHO, and WHO. Once published the first edition in 1996, Borrás was a strong advocate for the implementation of the standards in the region of Latin American and the Caribbean. Borrás was the editor of Organization, Development, Quality Assurance, and Radiation Protection in Radiology Services: Imaging and Radiation Therapy, a textbook published by the PAHO in English in 1996 and in Spanish in 1997.

It addressed to government and hospital administrators, discussing the issues of infrastructure, personnel, training, radiation protection and quality assurance needs in radiation oncology and diagnostic radiology services. In 2000 she was promoted to PAHO Coordinator of Essential Drugs and Technology, until 2002.

== Career as a medical physicist ==
Borrás's career as a medical physicist started in 1964, following her undergraduate schooling and while waiting for a scholarship to pursue studies abroad, at the radiation oncology and nuclear medicine department of the Santa Creu i Sant Pau Hospital in Barcelona. Her activities included the calibration of the cobalt-60 and orthovoltage radiotherapy units, teaching part-time in the radiation oncology department, and radiobiology research, anticipating what would become later the typical work of a medical physicist.

Later, she worked as a radiological physicist in San Francisco, CA; Recife, Pernambuco, Brazil; and in Washington DC. She is board-certified by the American Board of Radiology (ABR), in Radiological Physics, and since 1991 by the American Board of Medical Physics, in Medical Health Physics, She is a member of the American Association of Physicists in Medicine, the American College of Radiology (ACR), the Health Physics Society, the Society of Nuclear Medicine and Molecular Imaging, and the Spanish Medical Physics (SEFM) and Radiation Protection Societies. At the International Organization for Medical Physics she chaired for nine years the Science Committee and at the International Union for Physical and Engineering Sciences in Medicine (IUPESM), co-chaired the Health Technology Task Group. She currently chairs the AAPM International Educational Activities Committee.

She holds an adjunct faculty position at The George Washington University School of Medicine and Health Sciences, and works as a consultant for IAEA, PAHO and WHO and other international organizations.

== Awards and honors ==
Borrás is a Fellow of the American College of Radiology, the American Association of Physicists in Medicine, the International Organization for Medical Physics, the Health Physics Society, and the International Union for Physical and Engineering Sciences in Medicine. She has been given awards by the IUPESM, the SEFM, the AAPM (winner of the 2013 Edith H. Quimby Lifetime Achievement Award, one of the four major awards given by AAPM), the IOMP, the Latin American Medical Physics Association, the American College of Clinical Engineering, the ACR and the ABR.), the IOMP, the Latin American Federation of Medical Physics, the American College of Clinical Engineering, the ACR and the ABR.

== Books ==
- Borrás, Caridad (editor), Organization, Development, Quality Assurance, and Radiation Protection in Radiology Services: Imaging and Radiation Therapy, PAHO/WHO, 1997.
- Borrás, Caridad, Hanson, Gerald P., Jiménez, Pablo. History of the Radiological Health Program of the Pan American Health Organization: 1960-2006, PAHO/WHO, 2006.
- Borrás, Caridad (editor). Defining the Medical Imaging Requirements for a Rural Health Center, Springer Science+Business Media, Singapore, 2017.

== See also ==
- List of female scientists in the 21st century
