= Deborah Martin-Downs =

Canadian aquatic biologist

B.E.S., M.Sc., PhD Deborah Martin-Downs
- Born: Deborah Martin; Canada
- Education: Bachelor of Science Degree - Biology and Environmental Studies - University of Waterloo - 1979 Master's degree of Zoology - University of Toronto - 1984 Honorary PhD - Lakehead University - 2018
- Alma mater: University of Toronto, University of Waterloo, Lakehead University
- Occupation: Ecologist
- Years active: 1980-2021
- Spouse: Jim Downs

Deborah Martin-Downs is a Canadian aquatic biologist who specializes in fish and their environments. She has worked in ecology and conservation for over 30 years in Toronto both as a consultant and as director of the Toronto and Region Conservation Authority (TRCA). She is currently retired.

== Education ==
Martin-Downs grew up in Canada and became interested in environmental issues while in high school. She completed a Bachelor of Science degree in biology and environmental studies at the University of Waterloo in 1979. She returned to school and in 1984 earned a master's degree in zoology at the University of Toronto.

Martin-Downs received an honorary PhD from Lakehead University in 2018.

== Career ==
She worked as an environmental consultant, first as an assistant aquatic biologist with Ecoplans and then as a part of the Toronto Area Watershed Management Strategy (TAWMS) until 1982, when she received a scholarship from the Natural Sciences and Engineering Research Council. Her thesis evaluated the biological species in the Credit River and made recommendations for a water management strategy. After completing her degree, Martin-Downs gained approval from the Ministry of Environment to do a study similar to the one covered in her thesis for the Don River.

Between 1985 and 1989 she organized and managed a project in conjunction with the Toronto and Region Conservation Authority (TRCA) and the Ministry of Natural Resources, which developed recreational resources at urban water sites. The program created educational and leisure activities for fishing resources with the aim of gaining community support for environmental rehabilitation of urban ponds and waterways. Facing budget cuts, she became an environmental consultant with Gartner Lee Associates in 1989, working on projects throughout Ontario, and in some locations in British Columbia, Newfoundland, and the Yukon. She became a principal at Garnter Lee in 1994 and headed their Environmental Planning Team for a decade before becoming the Director of the Ecology Division at the TRCA in 2005. During her tenure at the TRCA, Martin-Downs continued conservation efforts of the Don River, and worked with other governmental agencies to improve performance in "water and air quality, carbon emissions, waste diversion, land use and biodiversity".

In August 2013, Martin-Downs became the Chief Administrative Officer of the Credit Valley Conservation Authority, where she is working on a conservation development project for the border between Etobicoke and Mississauga as part of the Lakeview Waterfront Connection Project. She retired from Credit Valley Conservation at December 31, 2021 as Chief Administrative Officer.

Martin-Downs became a director at Muskoka Lakes Association in 2015, serving as president from 2020 to 2022. Her current position at Muskoka Lakes Association is Chair of the Environment Committee and a member in Government & land use committee.

Martin-Downs is also a member of Ontario's Greenbelt Council since April 2018.

In January 2018, Martin-Downs became the Director of the Walkerton Clean Water Centre.

== Selected publications ==
- Martin-Downs, Deborah (1988). Don River biological inventory past, present and future evaluation (Report). Toronto Area Watershed Management Strategy Steering Committee. Toronto, Ontario, Canada: Toronto Area Watershed Management Strategy Steering Committee.
- Martin-Downs, Deborah (1990). Biological overview of Frenchman's Bay, Town of Pickering (Report). Sandbury Building Corporation. Markham, Ontario, Canada: Gartner Lee Associates.
- Martin-Downs, Deborah (2010). One water : supporting watershed management and green infrastructure in Ontario policy (Report). Canadian Electronic Library (Firm). Ottawa, Ontario, Canada: Ontario Water Conservation Alliance.
