= Henri Fontaine =

French Roman Catholic missionary (1924–2020)

Henri Fontaine (French pronunciation: [ɑ̃ʁi fɔ̃tɛn]; 20 July 1924 – 31 January 2020), was a French Roman Catholic missionary. He was also a pre-Tertiary geologist/paleontologist, Paleozoic corals specialist, and archaeologist.

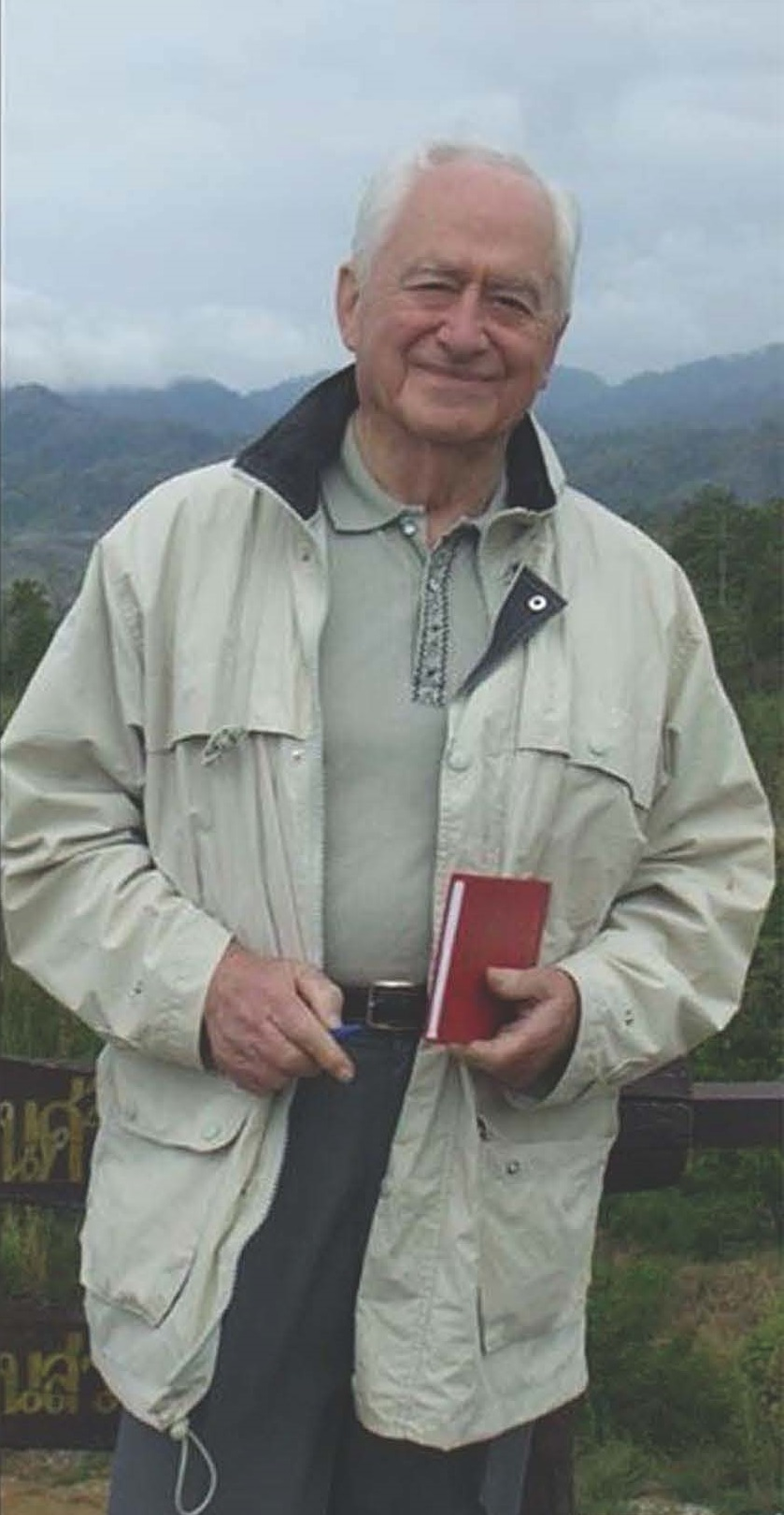

== Biography ==
Fontaine was born in Normandy, France in July 1924.

Admitted into the Society of Foreign Missions of Paris and ordained in 1948, he was sent to Hanoi (Vietnam) in 1951 as professor at the Petit Séminaire. Meantime, he plunged into the study of Devonian corals of Indochina and Yunnan. In 1954 when Viet Nam was divided into North and South, he settled at Saigon.

When he arrived in Saigon, there was neither a geological survey nor geologists. Upon the request of the Government of South Viet Nam, he set up and oversaw the new Geological Survey, and carried out research into limestone and coal for developing a cement factory and coal mine, pure silica sands for glassworks, and mineral springs for drinking and medicinal waters. Mineral water of the Dangun Spring (Province of Binh Thuân), one of the studied springs, has been exploited and bottled under the name Laska; its label mentions discovery in the 1950s by the French scientist H. Fontaine.

He released the only annual geological publication Archives géologiques du Viet Nam of which the first number came out in 1952 at Hanoi under the direction of Edmond Saurin who was the last chief of Geological Survey of Indochina. From then on to 1975, this publication went through 16 new editions under his responsibility.

Early 1960, after getting Doctorat ès Sciences (PhD) at the University of Paris (Sorbonne, France), he was officially appointed expert-geologist to the Geological Survey of the Republic of Viet Nam, dependent himself on the Department of Cultural and Technical Cooperation (Ministry of Foreign Affairs of France) from then on to 1976.

He founded the Department of Geology of the University of Huê (ancient imperial capital) and supported post-graduate students at the Faculty of Sciences of Saigon.

His research improved the geological maps 1/2 000 000 of the former French Indochina, the geological understanding of coastal areas, islands of the Gulf of Thailand, and early Quaternary alluvial formations in the northwest of Saigon. He also contributed to developing pilot studies in order to build up dams on different rivers (La Nga, Dông Nai ...) and to explore heavy minerals in dunes of sand, along the eastern coast, and bauxite on basaltic plateaus.

On fieldworks, he discovered a prehistoric site at Phuoc Tân (on the route to Bà Ria) and unearthed many others (Ngai Thang, Cù lao Rùa, ...). Furthermore, he studied some archeological sites (Dau Giay, Hoà Vinh near Phan Thiêt). In 1971, with Hoang Thi Than, he discovered a funeral jars site at Phu Hoa (Province of Dông Nai). The sites of Hoà Vinh and Phu Hoà belong to the Sa Huynh Culture.

Late 1978, he was officially appointed cooperating expert to the CCOP (Coordinating Committee for Coastal and Offshore Geoscience Programmes in East and Southeast Asia) which is based at Bangkok (Thailand) and supported until 1991 by the United Nations; thereafter it was sponsored by member countries and cooperating countries. From 1973 onwards, the CCOP has conducted a research project entitled "Pre-Tertiary Petroleum Potentials in the CCOP Region" with the support of the French Government which appointed his experts on pre-Tertiary geology and palaeontology to the CCOP. Father Fontaine succeeded Mr André Bonnet, another French geologist, and spent many months each year in Asia.

He died in l’Haÿ-les-Roses, near Paris, in January 2020 at the age of 95.

== Selected bibliography ==
(See also references)

- 1971 - Viet Nam-Kampuchia-Lao, carte géologique = Geological map = Ban do dia chat (Reviewed and completed by H. Fontaine), Insets: Quan Dao Hoang Sa (Paracel) - Quan Dao Truong Sa (Spratly), scale 1:2,000,000, 99x69 cm, 3rd ed. Nat. Geogr. Directorate VN. Dalat (Viet Nam). http://trove.nla.gov.au/version/46282704
- 1973 - (and G. Délibrias) - Ancient marine levels of the Quaternary in Viet Nam. Journ. Hong Kong Archeol. Soc., 4: 29–33. Hong Kong. (Translation: W. Meacham). http://hkjo.lib.hku.hk/archive/files/6535d7b21578a177074b4bde0136d17f%5B%5D.
- 1980 - Edmond Saurin (1904–1977), Asian Perspectives, 23 (1): 1-8, Honolulu. http://scholarspace.manoa.hawaii.edu/bitstream/handle/10125/16886/AP-v23n1-obit.pdf?sequence=1
- 1980 - On the extent of the Sa Huynh Culture in continental Southeast Asia. Asian Perspectives, 23(1): 67–69. Honolulu. http://scholarspace.manoa.hawaii.edu/bitstream/handle/10125/16891/AP-v23n1-67-69.pdf?sequence=1
- 1980 - (and J.H.C.S. Davidson) – The archaeological site of Hoa Vkinh near Phan Thiet, Central Viet Nam. Asian Perspectives, 23 (1) : 71-98, Honolulu. http://scholarspace.manoa.hawaii.edu/bitstream/handle/10125/16892/AP-v23n1-71-98.pdf?sequence=1
- 1982 - (and R. Ingavat and D. Vachard) - Carboniferous corals from Northeast Thailand. Bull. Geol. Soc. Malaysia, 15: 47-56, 2 pl. Kuala Lumpur. http://www.gsm.org.my/products/702001-101187-PDF.pdf
- 1984 - (and D.T.Nguyen, D. Vachard, C. Vozenin-Serra). The Permian of Southeast Asia. CCOP Conf. Proc. Ed., 338p. Bangdung (Indonesia). http://trove.nla.gov.au/version/21249670
- Fontaine, Henri; Poumot, Claude (1988). "The age of anthracite in Thailand". Journal of Southeast Asian Earth Sciences. 2 (1): 41–42. Bibcode:1988JAESc...2...41F. doi:10.1016/0743-9547(88)90020-7.
- Fontaine, H. (1988). "First conference on the geology of Indochina". Journal of Southeast Asian Earth Sciences. 2 (1): 43. Bibcode:1988JAESc...2...43F. doi:10.1016/0743-9547(88)90021-9.
- Fontaine, Henri; Lys, Maurice; Duc Tien, Nguyen (1988). "Some Permian corals from East Peninsular Malaysia: Associated microfossils, paleogeographic significance". Journal of Southeast Asian Earth Sciences. 2 (2): 65. Bibcode:1988JAESc...2...65F. doi:10.1016/0743-9547(88)90010-4.
- Fontaine, Henri; Khoo, Han Peng; Vachard, Daniel (1988). "Discovery of Triassic fossils at Bukit Chuping, in Gunung Sinyum area, and at Kota Jin, Peninsular Malaysia". Journal of Southeast Asian Earth Sciences. 2 (3–4): 145. Bibcode:1988JAESc...2..145F. doi:10.1016/0743-9547(88)90026-8.
- 1989 - (and S. Gafoer) - The pre-Tertiary fossils of Sumatra and their environments. 22nd Session, CCOP Conf. Proc. Ed.: 356 p. Bangkok. http://trove.nla.gov.au/version/7047624
- Fontaine, Henri; Rodziah, Daud; Singh, Updesh (1990). "Discovery of an Upper Triassic limestone basement in the Malay Basin, offshore Peninsular Malaysia: Regional implications". Journal of Southeast Asian Earth Sciences. 4 (3): 219. Bibcode:1990JAESc...4..219F. doi:10.1016/S0743-9547(05)80015-7.
- 1990 - (and L. Beauvais, M. Caridroit, C. Chonglakmani, P. David, E. Espiritu, S. Gafoer, Y. Jongkanjanasoontorn, H. P. Khoo, S. Lovachalasupaporn, B. Mistiaen, D.T. Nguyen, C. Poumot, B. Sektheera, B. Songsirikul, Suharsono, V. Suteethorn, W. Tantiwanit, V. Tansuwan, D.T. Tong and D. Vachard ) - Ten Years of CCOP research on the pre-Tertiary of East Asia. CCOP Techn. Publ., 20: 375 p.. Bangkok. http://trove.nla.gov.au/version/27183981
- Fontaine, Henri; Chonglakmani, Chongpan; Piyasin, Sangat; Ibrahim, Bin Amnan; Khoo, Han Peng (1993). "Triassic limestone within and around the Gulf of Thailand". Journal of Southeast Asian Earth Sciences. 8 (1–4): 83–95. Bibcode:1993JAESc...8...83F. doi:10.1016/0743-9547(93)90010-M.
- Fontaine, Henri; Chonglakmani, Chongpan; Bin Amnan, Ibrahim; Piyasin, Sangat (1994). "A well-defined Permian biogeographic unit: Peninsular Thailand and northwest Peninsular Malaysia". Journal of Southeast Asian Earth Sciences. 9 (1–2): 129–151. Bibcode:1994JAESc...9..129F. doi:10.1016/0743-9547(94)90071-X.
- Henri Fontaine, N. Sattayarak and V. Suteethorn (1994) Permian corals of Thailand. CCOP Technical Bull., 24, 171 p. including 31 pl.. Chishitsu Chōsajo (Japan).
- Fontaine, H.; Workman, D. R. (1997). "Indochina: Regional review". Encyclopedia of European and Asian Regional Geology. Encyclopedia of Earth Science. pp. 372–6. doi:10.1007/1-4020-4495-X_48. ISBN 0-412-74040-0.
- 1995 - (and Ibrahim B. A.) – Biostratigraphy of the Kinta Valley, Perak. Geol. Soc. Malaysia Bull., 38: 159-172, 4 pl. http://www.gsm.org.my/products/702001-100916-PDF.pdf
- Fontaine, Henri; Suteethorn, Varavudh; Vachard, Daniel (1995). "The Carboniferous of northeast Thailand: A review with new data". Journal of Southeast Asian Earth Sciences. 12 (1–2): 1–17. Bibcode:1995JAESc..12....1F. doi:10.1016/0743-9547(95)00027-5.
- 1999 - (and Ibrahim B. A. and D. Vachard) – Important discovery of late Early Permian limestone in southern Terengganu, Peninsular Malaysia. GEOSEA’1998 Proceedings, Bull. Geol. Soc. Malaysia Bull., 43: 455 – 460. http://www.gsm.org.my/products/702001-100795-PDF.pdf
- 1999 - (and S. Salyapongse and D. Vachard) – The Carboniferous of East Thailand – new information from microfossils. GEOSEA’1998 Proceedings, Bull. Geol. Soc. Malaysia, Bull., 43: 461 – 465. http://www.gsm.org.my/products/702001-100794-PDF.pdf
- 1999 - (and Bunopas S., J. T. Wasson, P. Vella, H. Fontaine, S. Hada, C. Burrett, T. Supajunya and S. Khositanont) - The Early Quaternary global terrestrial impact of a whole comet in the Australasian tektite field, newest apparent evidences and discoveries from Thailand and East Asia. GEOSEA’1998 Proceedings, Geol. Soc. Malaysia Bull., 43: 555 – 575. http://www.gsm.org.my/products/702001-100784-PDF.pdf
- 2000 - (and S. Salayapongse, V. Suteenthorn, D. Vachard) –Widespread occurrence of Triassic Limestones Northwest of Uthai Thani in West Thailand. Nat . Hist. Bull. Siam Society, 48: 7 – 19, 13 fig.. Bangkok. http://www.siamese-heritage.org/nhbsspdf/vol041-050/NHBSS_048_1h_Fontaine_WidespreadOccurr.pdf
- Fontaine, Henri (2002). "Permian of Southeast Asia: An overview". Journal of Asian Earth Sciences. 20 (6): 567–588. Bibcode:2002JAESc..20..567F. doi:10.1016/S1367-9120(01)00076-1.
- 2003 - (and S. Salayapongse, V. Suteenthorn) - Glimpses into Fossil Assemblages of Thailand: Coral Perspectives. Nat . Hist. Bull. Siam Society, 51(1): 37 – 67, 9 fig.. Bangkok. http://www.siamese-heritage.org/nhbsspdf/vol051-060/NHBSS_051_1h_Fontaine_GlimpsesIntoFoss.pdf
- 2005 - (and S. Salayapongse, V. Suteenthorn) - Fossil Biodiversity in the Limestones of Thailand: A Cornucopia of Information about the History of Life. Nat . Hist. Bull. Siam Society, 53(1): 33 – 70, 11 fig.. Bangkok. http://www.siamese-heritage.org/nhbsspdf/vol051-060/NHBSS_053_1h_Fontaine_FossilBiodiversi.pdf
- 2007 - (and V. Suteenthorn) - Carboniferous Corals of Pang Mapha District, Northwest Thailand. Nat. Hist. Bull. Siam Society, 53(1): 199-221, 13 fig.. Bangkok. http://www.siamese-heritage.org/nhbsspdf/vol051-060/NHBSS_055_2e_Fontaine_CarboniferousCor.pdf
- 2012 - (and S. Kavinate, T. T. Hoang, and D. Vachard) - Permian Limestone of Peninsular and Western Thailand in Khao Yoi, Chaam and Thong Pha Phum Areas. Nat. Hist. Bull. Siam Society, 58: 39-47, 6 fig.. Bangkok. http://www.siamese-heritage.org/nhbsspdf/vol051-060/NHBSS_058_1k_Fontaine_PermianLimestone.pdf
- Fontaine, Henri; Hoang, Thi Than; Kavinate, Sathaporn; Suteethorn, Varavudh; Vachard, Daniel (2013). "Upper Permian (Late Changhsingian) marine strata in Nan Province, northern Thailand". Journal of Asian Earth Sciences. 76: 115–119. Bibcode:2013JAESc..76..115F. doi:10.1016/j.jseaes.2013.01.006.
