= Felice Jacka =

Australian nutritional psychiatrist

Felice Nellie Jacka is an Australian academic, founder and president of the International Society for Nutritional Psychiatry Research. She is a professor of Nutritional Psychiatry and the director of the Food & Mood Centre at Deakin University.

Jacka focused her research work in the field of nutritional psychiatry, establishing diet as a risk factor and treatment target for common mental disorders. In 2017, she led a trial showing that an improved diet could treat major depression, finding that healthier eating habits can result in a 30% reduced risk of depression.

Articles in the Australian press about Jacka's studies include The Guardian, The Sydney Morning Herald and ABC News. With over 260 publications, she is an ISI Highly Cited Researcher for all years between 2020 and 2023, ranking her in the top 0.1% of publishing scientists worldwide.

In 2021 Jacka was awarded a Medal of the Order of Australia (OAM) for her service to nutritional psychiatry research.

In 2026 Jacka was nominated as the Laureate for Asia and the Pacific and awarded the 2026 L'Oréal-UNESCO for Women In Science International Award for establishing the field of nutritional psychiatry.

== Selected publications ==
- Challenges and priorities for researching the gut microbiota in individuals living with anorexia nervosa, 2023.
- Nutrition and bipolar disorder: a systematic review, 2022.
- Assessing the feasibility of an m-Health intervention for changing diet quality and mood in individuals with depression: the My Food & Mood program, 2021.
- Nutrition-based interventions for mood disorders, 2020.
- Fermented foods, the gut and mental health: a mechanistic overview with implications for depression and anxiety, 2020
- A modified Mediterranean dietary intervention for adults with major depression: Dietary protocol and feasibility data from the SMILES trial, 2018.
- Dietary recommendations for the prevention of depression, 2015.
