= Nutritional psychiatry =

Clinical application of psychiatry to treat nutritional issues

Nutritional psychiatry is the emerging scientific field dedicated to exploring the relationship between the effects of diet and mental health. There is ongoing research about how poor diets directly influence the development of cognitive decline, as well as symptoms of psychiatric conditions, such as ADHD, depression, inflammation, anxiety, bipolar disorder, and schizophrenia. There is also research about how specific diets, those that focus on maintaining balanced nutrition, could be potential avenues for treatment of mental health conditions. A healthy diet provides the necessary micro and macronutrients that serve as the building blocks for curating stable mental health.

== Depression ==
In addition, nutrition psychiatry acknowledges the importance of quality diet in relation to improved mood regulation. Research from four randomized controlled trials on the relationship between a proper diet and improved mood regulation has provided new evidence suggesting a causal link between the two factors. One trial in particular, the SMILES trial, concluded that a three-week dietary intervention for young individuals with moderate to severe depressive symptoms (scoring above 7 on the DASS) resulted in significant mood improvements. A common explanation for the mood improvements linked to dietary changes is that nutrients directly or indirectly influence brain function, producing effects similar to those of medication. Ways in which brain function is elevated is through inflammation pathways, reduced stress levels, and enhanced brain cell growth and adaptability, especially in the hippocampus. As previously stated, Research suggests that a quality diet is crucial for developing and maintaining a healthy brain. A healthy diet is generally characterized by a high intake of fruit, vegetables, whole grains, nuts, seeds, fish, and limited processed foods. Conversely, diets in high processed foods, fats and sugars are associated with anxiety and depression. It is noted that the relationship between diet and mental health is "multi-directional," as people experiencing mental illness may face various barriers that make it difficult to adhere to a balanced diet.

== Inflammation ==
Neuroinflammation is the activation of the brains immune cells, often in response to highly processed fatty diet.Common symptoms of inflammation is brain fog, depression, anxiety, mood disruption, fatigue, and memory loss. A state of "chronic low-grade inflammation" has been found to play a role in the development of many diseases that affect the brain, including mental disorders and neurodegenerative disorders that can range from anxiety and depression to Alzheimer's and Parkinson's. In this context, the gut–brain axis plays a key role, as changes in gut microbiota can affect the production of neurotransmitters—especially serotonin, which is a major regulator of mood and emotion—thereby contributing to mood disorders and cognitive disturbances. The "Western diet" contains more refined sugars, saturated fat, and sodium and is linked to brain-related changes, including disruption of the blood–brain barrier and increased neuroinflammation.Thus, the "Mediterranean diet" is a specific dietary pattern of interest for researchers given its anti-inflammatory effects. It emphasizes vegetables, fruits, olive oil, and limited red meat and sugar.

Furthermore, the field recognizes that micronutrient deficiencies, especially those involving essential B vitamins (B12 and folate), can impair cognition and contribute to psychiatric symptoms, including fatigue and depression. This evidence has led to the successful investigation of dietary improvement programs in randomized controlled trials (RCTs). These trials demonstrate that structured nutritional interventions can effectively serve as a valuable treatment to help mitigate symptoms in individuals with moderate to severe depression.

The gut microbiome has also been shown to influence brain health. A well-balanced and diverse gut microbiota made up of beneficial bacteria is essential for overall health, as it supports digestion, strengthens immune function, and helps produce important nutrients. The presence of different species of bacteria in the gut will change depending on type of diet pattern, such as a Western versus a Mediterranean diet.

== Other mental health disorders ==
Bipolar disorder is a mood disorder involving dramatic swings between manic and depressive states, whereas schizophrenia is a long-term psychotic disorder characterized by hallucinations, delusions, and disorganized thought processes. Despite being separate conditions, they share some genetic vulnerabilities and may both involve psychotic features, which can create overlap in how they are diagnosed and treated. Omega-3 supplementation has been associated with improvements in symptoms and overall functioning in individuals with schizophrenia and early-stage psychosis, as well as in the mood symptoms experienced in bipolar disorder.Bipolar disorder and schizophrenia are also associated with inflammation.

It is possible that bipolar disorder symptoms could also be improved by diet, specifically by omega-3 fatty acids, probiotics, and coenzyme Q supplements. A well-balanced diet overall is protective in bipolar disorder, but further research is required to determine whether a specific supplement regimen should become standard.

== Evolutionary mismatch ==
It is also known that modern lifestyle changes have shifted humans away from "traditional dietary patterns," and this may play a role in the development of mental health disorders. Logan and Jacka tell us about an "evolutionary mismatch," stating that diets nowadays have more sodium, saturated fats, and refined sugars. This is in comparison to the "ancestral diets" of humans that was largely plant- and animal-based, with little added fats or sugar. Nutritional psychiatry can be used to explore the fields of biological and environmental factors that influence the mental health that we face today.

== Mediterranean diet ==
Several avenues of research have investigated the specific impact of a Mediterranean diet on psychological well-being. A Mediterranean diet has been shown to improve neurological disorders. Vitamin D supplementation and fish oil supplementation are also thought to reduce levels of inflammation. Findings suggest that adding vitamin D and fish oil supplements to an existing treatment for depression could have benefits.Ultra-processed foods are also associated with depression.

Recent evidence suggests that the Mediterranean diet, which prioritizes whole foods such as fruit, vegetables, whole grains, healthy fats, and fish, with moderations on dairy, poultry, red meat, and processed foods, directly relates to reduced depression and anxiety. The Supporting the Modification of Lifestyle in Lowered Emotional States trial, the first reported study on the relationship between the Mediterranean diet and lifestyle, concluded significant improvement in major depressive episodes.Additional research in adolescents (10-19yo) suggests that dietary patterns should be adjusted to align more closely with the Mediterranean diet in comparison with Western practices as the reduction of sweetened beverages and processed foods may be more effective in reducing symptoms of depression.

Studies have shown that "prebiotic, probiotic, or synbiotic treatment" based in the Mediterranean diet can reduce depressive symptoms. These treatments can increase the diversity of bacteria in the gut and enhance their survival.

A Mediterranean-style diet, along with increased intake of fruits and vegetables, omega-3 fatty acids, balanced dietary patterns, comprehensive micronutrient supplementation, and nutrients such as zinc, magnesium, and selenium, as well as probiotics and various phytochemicals has been associated with improvements in anxiety disorders. Dietary factors associated with the Western diet including foods with high saturated fats and sugar as well as the consumption of high amounts of ultra-processed foods have been associated with increased anxiety. Data pulled from a pre-clinical trial surrounding the impacts of diet on social isolation within socially housed crab eating monkeys (Macaca fascicularis) suggests a direct positive relationship between the Mediterranean diet and affiliation. The trial also concluded a significant decrease in sociableness among the monkeys that were fed with the Western style diet. In humans, social isolation has been linked to increased inflammation and is considered a risk factor for psychiatric conditions. Given the biological and behavioral similarities between humans and primates, the greater levels of isolation observed in monkeys fed a Western diet compared to those fed a Mediterranean diet further supports an association between Western dietary patterns and psychiatric disorders such as anxiety.

A Mediterranean diet has been shown to be beneficial in bipolar disorder and in schizophrenia.
