= Natalie Panek =

Canadian aerospace engineer (born 1983)

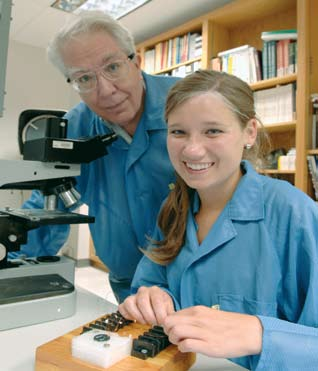
- Natalie Panek, NASA Intern, setting up a transformer for wire fatigue testing with mentor, Dr. Henning Leidecker.
- Citizenship: Canada
- Education: University of Calgary; University of Toronto
- Employer: MDA
- Known for: Aerospace Engineering; Science Communication

Natalie Panek is a Canadian working in aerospace engineering. She works in the robotics and automation division of the space technology company MDA.

== Early life and education ==
Panek grew up in Calgary, Alberta. She competed in the North American Solar Challenge in 2005. Panek completed a bachelor's degree in mechanical engineering at the University of Calgary in 2007. She earned a masters in aerospace engineering at the University of Toronto in 2009. In summer 2008, she worked at Goddard Space Flight Center.

== Career ==
After graduating, Panek attended the International Space University at Ames Research Center. Panek works at the space technology company MDA where she works on Canadian space exploration and robotics. She is on the engineering team building the chassis and locomotion systems for European Space Agency's Rosalind Franklin Mars rover.

== Public engagement ==
In 2012, Panek created the STEM mentorship blog The Panek Room, which offers career advice to girls and connects them mentors. Panek regularly gives interviews about her career and campaigns for increased representation of women in science. She spoke at the 2016 Women of Influence and 2017 Girl Talk Empowerment conferences.

Alongside her work and advocacy, Panek enjoys backpacking.

== Awards and honours ==
2013 - University of Calgary Graduate of the Last Decade Award

2015 - Forbes 30 under 30

2015 - Flare magazine's 30 under 30

2016 - Wings Magazine Top 20 under 40
