= Tri Mumpuni =

Indonesian micro-hydropower inventor

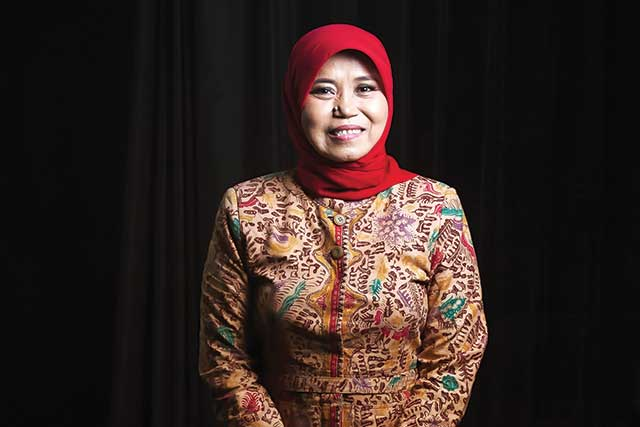

Member of National Research and Innovation Agency Steering Committee
- Incumbent
- Assumed office 13 October 2021
- President: Joko Widodo
- Head of Steering Committee: Megawati Soekarnoputri

Personal details
- Born: August 6, 1964 (age 62) Semarang, Central Java, Indonesia
- Party: Independent
- Spouse: Iskandar Budisaroso Kuntoadji
- Education: Bogor Agricultural Institute; University of Costa Rica; Chiang Mai University
- Occupation: Independent researcher, social entrepreneur, philanthropist, social activist, and micro-hydropower inventor
- Website: http://3.ibeka.or.id/wp/index.php/en/home/

Tri Mumpuni, also known as Bu Puni (Mrs. Puni) is an Indonesian researcher, social entrepreneur, philanthropist, social activist, and micro-hydropower inventor who was involved in the project for the development of hydro power electricity for more than half a million people in Indonesia. In 2010 she was elected as board member of National Committee on Innovation (KIN/Komite Inovasi Nasional). For her work she was awarded the prestigious Ramon Magsaysay Award in 2011. On 13 October 2021, she was appointed a Member of the National Research and Innovation Agency (BRIN) Steering Committee by Joko Widodo.

== Early life and education ==
Puni was born in Semarang to Wiyatno and Gemiarsih. His father was an employee of a government-owned enterprise, while her mother was a graduate of local home economy school who often helped people in her village to combat skin ulceration disease which was quite rampant due to unhygienic conditions. From them, she learned a lot about social activism and aspirated to become a medical doctor to help villagers.

In 1982, Indonesian Institute of Sciences held a junior scientific paper competition. She won the competition. One of the jury, Andi Hakim Nasution [id], professor of Statistics and Quantitative Genetics of Bogor Agricultural Institute (IPB) at that time was attracted and interested with her paper. When her application to Faculty of Medicine Diponegoro University was rejected, Professor Andi, somehow learned the news. He later tracked her and giving her an opportunity to study in Faculty of Agriculture IPB with his recommendation. She later enrolled to Department of Agricultural Social and Economy, Faculty of Agriculture, IPB and finally graduated in 1990.

After her graduation, she later took Master of Energy and Sustainable Development at University of Costa Rica (graduated in 1992) and Master of Trade and Sustainable Development at Chiang Mai University (graduated in 1993). She also took professional courses at Leadership for Environment and Development Course, LEAD International, New York funded by Rockefeller Foundation (1993-1995).

== IBEKA ==
Sometime, she met her husband, Iskandar Budisaroso Kuntoadji, a geological engineer graduated from Bandung Institute of Technology.and was received training to build micro-hydropower generator from Switzerland. Her husband was founded a NGO named Mandiri Foundation in 1987. However, his foundation did not last long and very slow in progress due to lack of resources. She realized that her husband plan was really helpful to people since his designed hydropower will suitable for Indonesia's remote area with sufficient water access, but with difficult terrains. She shifted his social entrepreneur from providing affordable housing for poor to micro-hydropower.

On 17 August 1992, she founded Institute of Business and Economic Affairs (Indonesian: Institut Bisnis dan Ekonomi Kerakyatan, IBEKA), a non-profit and non-governmental organization with her husband. She become the Director, while her husband become Chairman Board of Trustee As in 2021, she successfully built 61 micro-hydropower generator, which provided electricity to 65 villages in Indonesia and 1 village in Philippines.

== Fellowships and Accolades ==
During her span of careers, she achieved several accolades:

- Climate Hero from World Wildlife for Nature 2005
- Ashoka Fellowship (since 2006)
- One of the 99 Most Powerful Women in Asia
- Ramon Magsaysay Award 2011
- Ashden Award 2012
- One of 22 Influential Muslims Scientists and One of 500 Influential Muslims, The Muslim 500, Royal Islamic Strategic Studies Centre 2021
