= Suhad Bahajri =

Saudi Arabian chemist

- سهاد باحجري
- Occupation: Chemist
- Known for: Female chemist in Saudi Arabia

Suhad Bahajri (Arabic: سهاد باحجري) is a Saudi chemist. She is a medical scientist and educator presently working as a professor of clinical biochemistry and clinical nutrition at the faculty of medicine at King Abdulaziz University, Jeddah. Her research centers on diet, lifestyle and chronic diseases. She became a fellow of the International College of Nutrition in 2009.

== Career ==
Bahajri is known mainly for her research and contributions to the field of nutrition. She studied nutritional deficiencies in children, which helped to create new standards for the Saudi Market for milk and formula. She also worked on establishing a link between hyperparathyroidism, and subclinical hypothyroidism and excessive fluoride intake. Bahajri has won numemrous prizes, including recently at the 25th Annual Meeting of the International Congress on Nutrition and Integrative Medicine (ICNIM) in 2017 in Japan.
