= Shahina Farid =

British archaeologist

- Education: University of Liverpool
- Scientific career
- Fields: archaeology
- Workplaces: Çatalhöyük Research Project, English Heritage

Shahina Farid is a British archaeologist who is best known for her work as Field Director and Project Coordinator at the Neolithic site of Çatalhöyük in Turkey. She is currently the scientific dating coordinator for Historic England.

== Early life and education ==
Farid was born in London, England to Pakistani parents who had migrated to England. She spent her early years in Camden, England. A school visit to the Tutankhamun exhibition at the British Museum sparked her interest in archeology. She wanted to be an archaeologist by age 15, and she spent time volunteering at local excavations. She studied archaeology at the University of Liverpool.

== Archaeological career ==
After college, Farid worked as a commercial archaeologist in England, Turkey, Bahrain and the United Arab Emirates. Beginning in 1985, she was hired as field director of the Çatalhöyük project in 1999 and worked for 20 years as Field Director and Project Coordinator at the Neolithic site, until leaving in 2012. It is here that she was given the nickname "Lady of the Höyük", which endures today.

"Her work in constructing the Çatalhöyük stratigraphic sequence is the cornerstone of countless archaeological and scientific studies, reflected in her publication record of over 40 articles and reports, and without her input, the famous Hodder 'reflexive methodology' would only be a theory".

In 2012, Farid joined English Heritage. As a member of the Scientific Dating Team, she directs the commissioned dendrochronology program and is also honorary secretary for the British Institute at Ankara.

== Selected publications ==
- Farid, Shahina; et al. (2017). "Repealing the Çatalhöyük extractive metallurgy: The green, the fire and the 'slag' Author links open overlay panel". Journal of Archaeological Science. 86: 101–122. doi:10.1016/j.jas.2017.07.001.
- Hodder, Ian; et al. (2015). "Getting to the Bottom of It All: A Bayesian Approach to Dating the Start of Çatalhöyük". Journal of World Prehistory. 28: 1–26. doi:10.1007/s10963-015-9083-7. S2CID 254741301.
- Farid, Shahina; et al. (2008). "Figured Lifeworlds and Depositional Practices at Çatalhöyük". Cambridge Archaeological Journal. 18 (2): 139–161. doi:10.1017/S095977430800022X. S2CID 162470330.
