= Carmen Vela =

Spanish entrepreneur and researcher (born 1955)

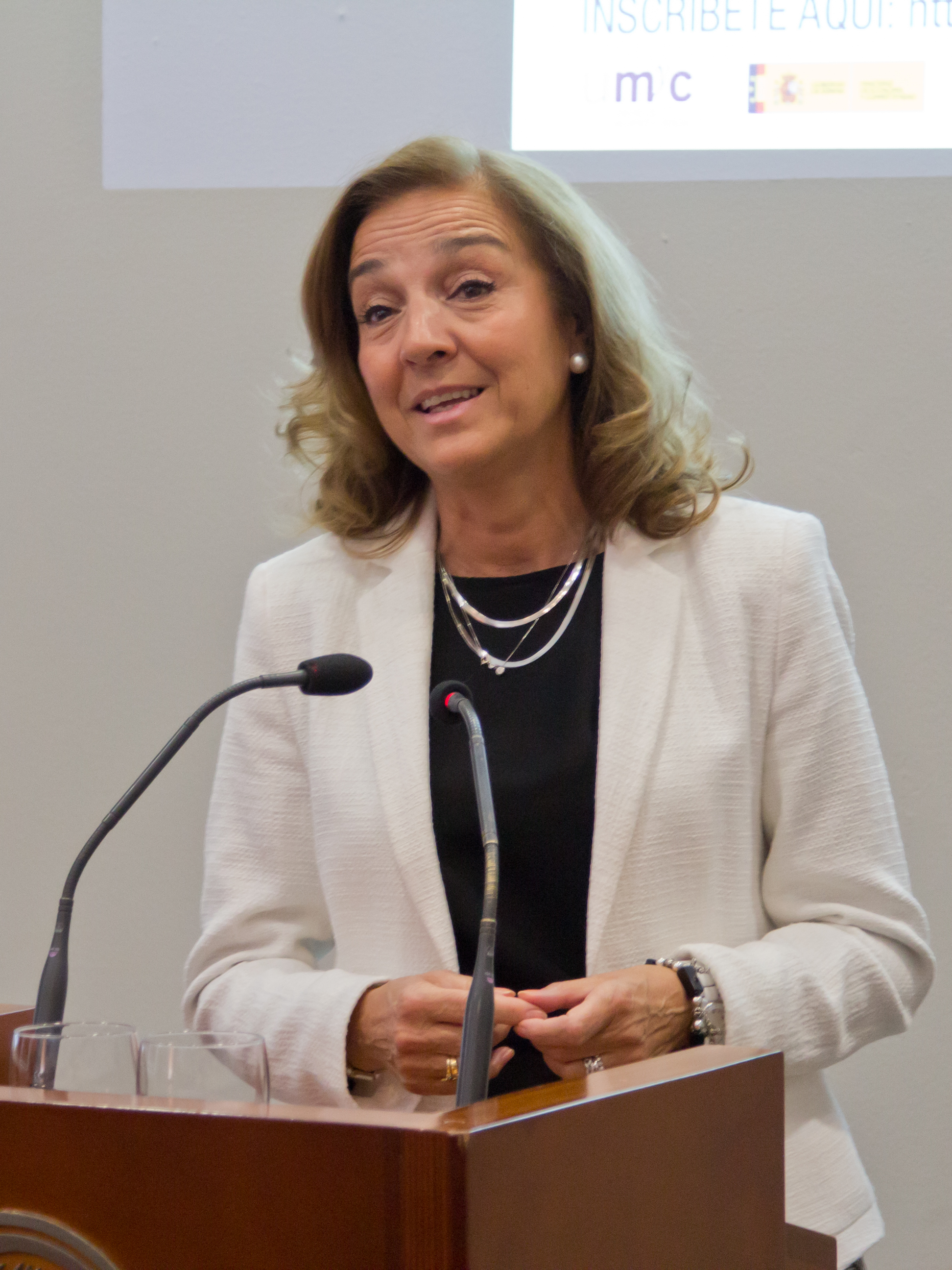
- Carmen Vela in 2015
- Born: Carmen Vela Olmo; 25 March 1955 (age 71); Sigüenza (Guadalajara), Spain
- Education: Complutense University of Madrid
- Occupations: Secretary of Ministry of Economy and Finance (Spain)

Carmen Vela Olmo (born 25 March 1955) is a Spanish entrepreneur, researcher and former secretary of state of investigation, development and innovation.

== Biography ==
Born on 25 March 1955 in Sigüenza, Spain, she graduated in Chemical Sciences from the Faculty of Chemical Sciences of the Universidad Complutense of Madrid and specialised in Biochemistry. She stayed five years in the Department of Immunology of the Foundation Jiménez Díaz, where she investigated allergy.

In 1982 she started working for Ingenasa (Inmunología y Genética Aplicada), a company dedicated biotechnology, created by the National Institute of Industry and moved to the Centre of Molecular Biology Severo Ochoa, in the Autonomous University of Madrid. She worked for the project CBM/Ingenasa, directed by Eladio Viñuela, devoted to the development of vaccines and diagnostics for the virus of the African swine plague, grave problem in Spain in that time. In 1988, Ingenasa is privatised and bought by Ercros. After the bankruptcy of Ercros, Vela and other two partners bought out Ingenasa. From 1994, Vela is the general director of Ingenasa.

Vela is the author of numerous scientific publications and patents approved in United States and Europe. She participates to evaluation committees of national and European programs and organisations, like the Advisory Board of the program PEOPLE of the VII Framework Programmes for Research and Technological Developmentof the European Union, the management council of the CSIC or the advisory council for science and technology of the Spanish ministries of Science and Technology, Education and Science, and Science and Innovation. Until October 2010 she was president of the Association of Women Researchers and Technologists (AMIT). From September 2010 until January 2012 she was president of the Spanish Society of Biotechnology (SEBIOT).

In January 2012, she became Secretary of State of Investigation, Development and Innovation, with Prime Minister Mariano Rajoy and Luis de Guindos as minister of Economy and Competitiveness.

She is married and has two children.
