= Sarah Wayland =

Australian social worker and health researcher

Sarah Wayland is an Australian social worker and health researcher. Her research focuses on the areas of missing persons, ambiguous loss, grief and suicide bereavement. She is Professor in the School of Nursing, Midwifery and Social Sciences at the CQ University, Sydney (Australia) and a Senior Research Fellow for Manna Institute.

== Education and career ==
Wayland worked as a social worker from 1998-2010 in the fields of child protection and victims of crime. In 2005, she received a Churchill Fellowship to study "the international approach to counselling for families of missing persons focusing on the concept of unresolved loss".

She obtained her PhD from the University of New England in 2015, studying hope and ambiguous loss, and was awarded the Chancellors Medal for Doctoral Research.

In 2019, she collaborated with the Australian Federal Police National Missing Persons Coordination Centre to publish "Acknowledging the Empty Space", a resource for those supporting people whose loved one is missing.

She is a regular contributor to The Conversation, ABC News and Radio, and SBS.
