= Katalin Balázsi =

Hungarian material scientist

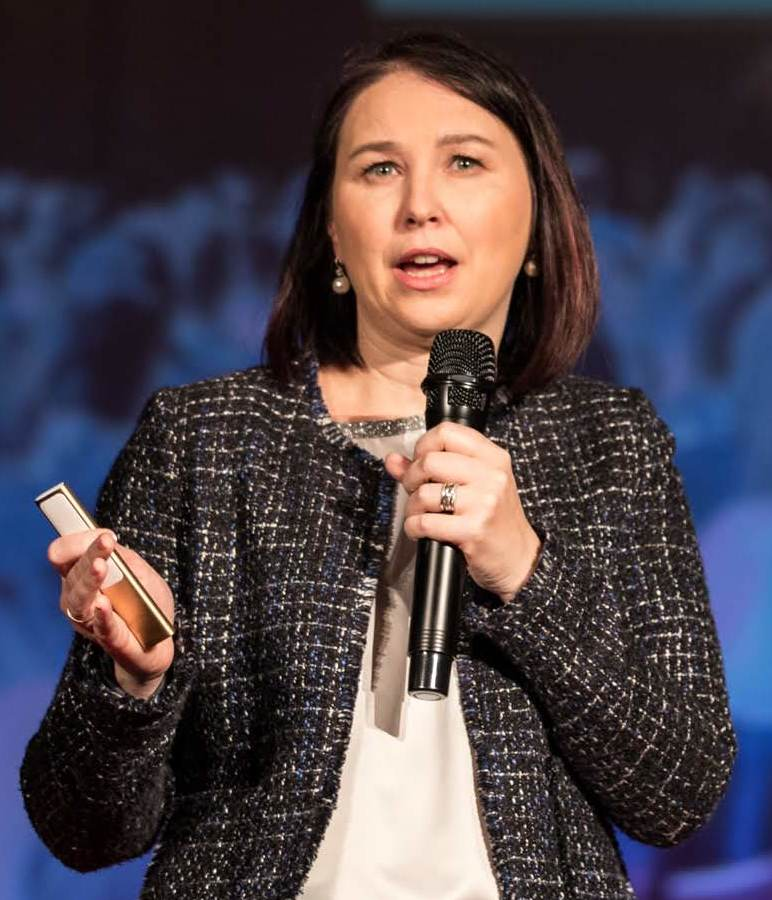
Balázsi in 2018

Katalin Balázsi (née Sedláčková; born 1978) is a Slovakia-born Hungarian material scientist. She is the head of the Thin Film Physics department in the Institute of Technical Physics and Materials Science, a component of the Centre for Energy Research, Eötvös Lóránd Research Network. She has also served as the President of the Association of Hungarian Women in Science (2018-2021).

== Early life ==
Balázsi was born in Šahy (Ipolyság), Slovakia in 1978. While in elementary school, she represented her school in mathematics competitions. For high school, her father enrolled her in an electrician high school: there were four other girls in her class, and thirty-two boys. She graduated with the top ranking in her class.

Balázsi completed her university degrees at the Faculty of Electrical Engineering and Information Technology of the Slovak University of Technology in Bratislava (STU). In 2000, she received a bachelor's degree in Electromaterials Engineering; she received a master's degree in materials science in 2002 from the same. During her master's degree, Balázsi worked as a technician at the Slovak Academy of Sciences. She then became a researcher at the Academy, using transmission electron microscopy to characterise the structures of nanomaterials; she received her doctorate in materials science from the STU in 2005. The Institute of Electrical Engineering at the Academy named her the "Young Researcher".

== Career ==
In 2006, Balázsi became a research fellow at the Institute of Technical Physics and Materials Science, part of the Hungarian Academy of Sciences. She was appointed as a senior scientist at the Institute's Centre for Energy Research in 2012. Besides her work with electron microscopy, Balázsi has also studied the development of different ceramic materials.

Balázsi and nine other female scientists founded the Association of Hungarian Women in Science in 2008 to address the national gender imbalance in Hungary's science sector; this Association won the first Nature Research Innovating Science Award in 2018. She has served as the Association's president from 2018 to 2021. She also received the 2021 Acta Materialia Mary Fortune Global Diversity Medal.

In 2021, she became the second Hungarian fellow of the European Ceramic Society (ECerS). She is a board member of the European Platform of Women Scientists (EPWS). She has also been secretary of the Hungarian Society for Material Sciences (2013-2020), as well as secretary and treasurer of the Hungarian Microscopic Society (2018-2022).

== Personal life ==
Her husband Csaba Balázsi is also a scientist. They have two sons. Besides Hungarian, she speaks Slovak, Czech, and English.
