= Ninet Sinaii =

Armenian-American epidemiologist

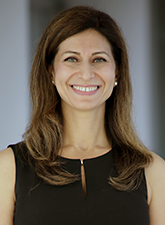
- Citizenship: United States
- Education: Occidental College (B.A.); George Washington University (M.P.H., Ph.D.)
- Scientific career
- Workplaces: Cedars-Sinai Medical Center Eunice Kennedy Shriver National Institute of Child Health and Human Development National Institutes of Health Clinical Center

Ninet Sinaii is an American epidemiologist of Armenian descent. She is a staff epidemiologist at the Biostatistics and Clinical Epidemiology Service (BCES) at the National Institutes of Health Clinical Center.

== Early life and education ==
Sinaii is Armenian and American. Her family moved from Iran to Germany and later the United States. She was introduced to epidemiology and public health during her junior year abroad in England. Sinaii received her bachelor of arts in psychobiology from Occidental College. She earned a Master of Public Health in Epidemiology and Biostatistics from Milken Institute School of Public Health, and her Ph.D. in epidemiology from the Columbian College of Arts and Sciences.

== Career ==
Sinaii has been at National Institutes of Health since 2000, first as a pre-doctoral fellow at the Eunice Kennedy Shriver National Institute of Child Health and Human Development, and since 2006, as a staff epidemiologist with the Biostatistics and Clinical Epidemiology Service (BCES) at the National Institutes of Health Clinical Center. In BCES, Sinaii has collaborated in a wide range of research activities and study designs involving the fields of hospital epidemiology and infectious diseases, bioethics, adult and pediatric endocrinology, women’s health, and other acute and chronic conditions. She has co-authored dozens of peer-reviewed articles searchable on PubMed and is a member of the Society for Epidemiologic Research. In addition, she takes part in the ancillary epidemiological/statistical teaching of medical and other graduate students, residents, and fellows; is involved in community public health projects; and is an appointed representative of the Clinical Center on the Prevention Research Coordinating Committee.

== Personal life ==
Sinaii is married and has children. She was a military wife for 15 years. Sinaii is Christian and a polyglot.
