= Hoang Thi Than =

Hoàng Thị Thân (born in 1944 at Phú Cường (Thủ Dầu Một, South Viêt Nam)) is the first woman to graduate from the Department of Geological Engineering of Laval University (Quebec, Canada), the first female Vietnamese geological engineer and archeologist. She is also a boat person.

== Biography ==
In 1965, she got a scholarship granted by the Canadian government for Laval University (Quebec). Among different proposed matters (chemistry, electricity, geology, mechanic), she chose geology. However, there was only geological engineering at Laval University. She was the only woman in her class with 12 other young men. On top of this, there was a very demanding schedule and difficulty relative to two foreign languages (French and English). Furthermore, the Canadian mining law at this time kept women out of the mine, so she could not make training course. After four years of study, she was the first woman to graduate of the Department of Geological Engineering of Laval University.

In June 1969, Hoàng T. T. returned to Viet Nam and three months later she started to work at the Geological Survey of Saigon, which depended on the Ministry of Economy of that time. In this survey, there were two French expert geologists. One took her on the field to explain the geology of the country. The other passed on his experience about the mineral study by X-rays to her. The first expert, Henri Fontaine, became, from 1971 to 1973, director of her thesis of engineering doctor, which was carried on the study of the clays of southern Viet Nam and their industrial uses and on the history of the geological surveys of Indochina (1898-1953) and of Republic of Viet Nam (1953-1973). Many small deposits, almost kaolin, were during longtime exploited for making porcelain or ceramic products, as well as bricks and roofing tiles. On the view of mineralogy, these clays were unknown. With the help of a diffractometer, Hoàng T. T. analyzed about a hundred samples of clays from diverse origins: kaolin from alluvions of ancient Quaternary (Province of Bình Dương, Biên Hoà) ), the clays of recent alluvions (different localities between Mekong and Đông Nai river), or from the weathering of granite, rhyolite and shale of Đà Lạt area (Province of Lâm Đồng). At the same time, she mentioned for the first time in Viet Nam the existence of bentonite being under a cover of red basaltic earth at Di Linh (Province of Lâm Đồng). Of volcano-lakeside origin, this clay was reported but not analyzed by Edmond Saurin In 1974, she discovered the same bentonite at Bảo Lộc area (Province of Lâm Đồng)(mixed with fragments of brown coal) and early 1975 at Tuy Hoà area (Province of Khánh Hòa). The study of these samples was not published because of politic events.

Hoàng T. T. often accompanied Dr H. Fontaine in his archeological researches. In 1971, they discovered and excavated a funeral jars site at Phú Hoà (Province of Đồng Nai). Dated roughly 500 years B.C., this site belongs to Sa Huynh culture. The study of this site permitted her to become the first Vietnamese woman archeologist.

== Bibliography ==
- 1971 – Fontaine H. et Hoang T. T. - Alluvions anciennes du Nam Phân septentrional. Arch. Géol. Viet Nam, 14 : 145-168, 4 pl., Saigon.
- 1972 - Note sur des argiles du Viet Nam méridional. Arch. Géol. Viet Nam, 15 : 25-65, 3 pl., Saigon.
- 1972 – Fontaine H., Bui K.H., Hoang T.T., et al. – Eau minérale dans les environs de Phuoc Lê. Remarque sur la géologie de cette région. Arch. Géol. Viet Nam, 15 : 145-148, Saigon.
- 1972 – Fontaine H. et Hoang T.T. – Carte géologique au 1/25 000 : feuilles de Biên Hoa et Phu Cuong. Institut Géographique, Da Lat (Viet Nam).
- 1973 – Deuxième note sur des argiles du Viet Nam méridional. Arch. Géol. Viet Nam, 17 : 57-66, Saigon.
- 1973 – Le Service Géologique de l’Indochine (1898-1953)_Le Service Géologique de la République du Viet Nam (1953-1973). Bull. Soc. Et. Indoch., nouv. série, 48(4) : 609-614, Saigon.
- 1975 – Fontaine H. et Hoang T.T. – Nouvelle note sur le champ de jarres funéraires de Phu Hoa, avec une remarque sur la crémation au Viet Nam. Bull. Soc. Et. Indoch., nouv. série, 50(1) : 7-73, 6 pl., Saigon.
- 2003 – La première diplômée du Département de génie géologique de l’Université Laval (1965-1969). Géoscope. Journ. Info. Départ. Géol. & Génie géol. Uni. Laval, 4(3) : 5-6, Québec.
- 2007 – Fontaine H., Hoang T.T. et al. – Permian limestones of Surat Thani Province, Peninsular Thailand. Geothai 07, International conference on geology of Thailand: 221-228, 4pl.
- 2009 – Fontaine H., Hoang T.T. et al. – Paleontology and stratigraphy of the Pang Mapha-Ban Na Wai region, Northwest Thailand: paleogeographical implications. Publication of the Department of Mineral Resources, August 2009: 1-161, 39 pl..
- 2009 – Fontaine H., Hoang T.T. et al. – Limestone exposures south of Phetchabun, mainly in the 1:50 000 Ban Na Chaliang sheet, Central Thailand. Publication of the Department of Mineral Resources, August 2009: 163-167, 12 pl..
- 2011 – Fontaine H., Chonglakmani C., Hoang T.T. et al. – Devonian limestone in northern Laos along Mekong River. World Conference on Paleontology and Stratigraphy, Nakhon Ratchasima. Program and Abstracts, 61.
- 2012 – Fontaine H., Hoang T.T. et al. – North Thailand 1-Very fossiliferous limestone belonging to the end of the Permian (Upper-Chianghsingian) in Wiang Sa area. 2-Another Upper Permian limestone in Phrea area. Journal of Science and Technology, Mahasarakham University, 3(1): 51-62, 6 pl..
- 2012 – Fontaine H., Kavinate S., Hoang T.T. and Vachard D. – Permian limestone of Peninsula and western Thailand in Khao Yoi, Cha-Am and Thong Pha Phum areas. Nat. Hist. Bull. Siam Soc., 58: 39-47, 3 pl..
- 2013 – Fontaine H., Hoang T.T. et al. – Upper Permian (Late Chianghsingian) marine strata in Nan Province, northern Thailand. Journ. Asian Earth Sc., 76: 115-119.
- 2013 – Fontaine H., Hoang T.T. et al. – Wide extension of Carboniferous limestone in Northwest Thailand with an interesting stratigraphy. Special Issue of the Journal of the Geological Society of Thailand, 65 p., 24 pl.
