= Martine Tabeaud =

French geographer, climatologist

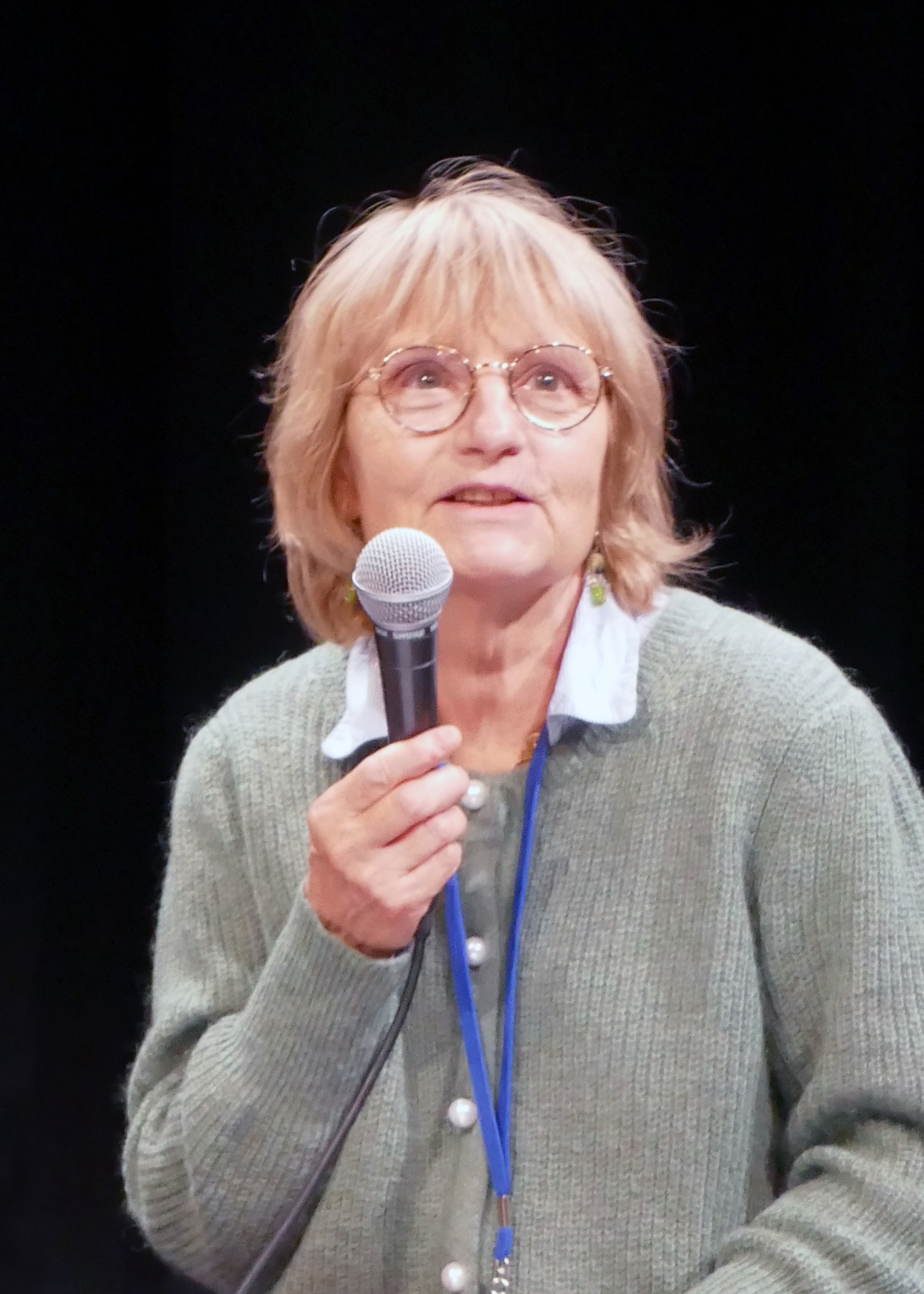
- Tabeaud in 2020
- Born: 1951 (age 74–75)
- Education: University of Paris 1 Pantheon-Sorbonne; Institut national de l’information géographique et forestière
- Occupation: Climatologist

Martine Tabeaud (born 1951) is a French geographer and specialist in climatology. Since 1977, she has taught at the University of Paris 1 Pantheon-Sorbonne. She is a member of the Riclim research group (Climate Risks), and questions the geopolitical strategies of climate management.

== Biography ==
Born in 1951, she holds a post-graduate diploma (DESS) in remote sensing, a diploma from Institut national de l’information géographique et forestière (IGN) and an agrégation in geography. A specialist in climatology, she completed a post-graduate thesis in Dijon on: Climatologie descriptive et imagerie satellitaire, contribution à la recherche d'une méthode d'analyse avec application aux basses latitudes under the supervision of Pierre Pagney, followed by a State thesis on l'Atlantique tropical austral: l'eau atmosphérique et le climat en milieu océanique again under the supervision of Pagney.

Tabeaud was appointed Professor at Paris-Panthéon-Sorbonne in 1989.

After serving as deputy director of LA 141 (now Unité mixte de recherche (UMR) Pierre Birot) in Meudon, she became director of UMR 8185 EneC (Espaces, nature et culture) at Paris-Sorbonne (now Sorbonne Université) and French National Centre for Scientific Research (CNRS).

In 2007, with Xavier Browaeys, Tabeaud created doc2geo, a website of geography documentaries accessible on the Internet.

In 2019, she was appointed scientific co-director of the International Geography Festival (FIG) De Saint-Dié des Vosges, in charge of co-organizing with Alexis Metzger the scientific program for the 31st edition of the FIG with Alexis Metzger. The theme was Climates.

In her latest work, Tabeaud analyzes the role of strategy and political decision-making in climatic phenomena and the fight against climate change, a discussion she explored in an article about her in Liberation.

== Selected works ==
Tabeaud has authored numerous articles, reports and book chapters.

- La climatologie générale, Armand Colin, 2008. ISBN 978-2-200-35423-7
- "L’Établissement Al-Assad, ferme d’État sur l’Euphrate avant la liquidation en 2000 : quelques effets pervers d’une approche de développement top‑down", Méditerranée, 119; 2012
