= Martine Dorais =

Researcher

Martine Dorais, is a researcher with Agriculture and Agri-Food Canada specializing in plant physiology. She is recognized around the world for her research on organic greenhouse production. In 2026, she is Professor at the Département de Phytologie at the Laval University, and runs the Dorais Lab there.

Dorais has authored over 200 academic publications. By mid-2026, her work had been cited over 7,000 times, with an h-index of 44.

== Biography ==
Dorais is a researcher in agronomy. Originally from Quebec's Eastern Townships region, Dorais studied agronomy at Laval University, spending her summers working at Agriculture and Agri-Food Canada. She completed a Ph.D. in the physiology of greenhouse crops grown under artificial light at Laval University and received further training at the University of California, Davis, where her goal was to grow peppers and tomatoes year-round. Dorais continued her training at the University of British Columbia, where she did three post-doctorates in mineral nutrition, biochemistry and ginseng. She later gained additional experience abroad at Wageningen University, in the Netherlands, and at the IRTA, in Barcelona, Spain.

== Career ==
It was during her post-doctoral studies in Vancouver that Dorais discovered organic farming. "Vancouver was influenced by California culture; organic food was already widely available in grocery stores." The philosophy of organic farming immediately sparked her interest. Dorais spent the early years of her career developing knowledge on medicinal plant physiology - first with Les serres Mirabel Inc., and then with Medicago to study the effect of light - and later on Christmas tree physiology. She conducted extensive research on the sustainable production of greenhouse tomatoes, developing cultural practices and quality measurement tools in parallel with the development of an organic production system for greenhouses and tunnels and the use of light-emitting diodes (LEDs). Dorais' vision and expertise in sustainable greenhouse production was recognized by the Swedish University of Agriculture Sciences, which awarded her an honorary doctorate.

In 2014, she became Chair of the ISHS Working group on organic greenhouse horticulture.

In late 2015, Dorais took the helm of a berry production research team in Agassiz and conducted research on the environmental impact of the use of nanoparticles in agriculture. In addition to having supervised close to 60 graduate students to date, Dorais has given lectures in some 10 countries and has published over 100 peer-reviewed scientific articles, books and book chapters, as well as hundreds of scientific conference posters and abstracts.

In 2020 she became Research Chair of the Ministry of Agriculture, Fisheries and Food (MAPAQ) Research group in organic greenhouse and controlled environments.

In 2022, she stood down as the Chair of the Commission for Agroecology and Organic Farming Systems of the International Society for Horticultural Science, a post she held for eight years.

== Awards ==
- Honorary doctorate from the Swedish University of Agricultural Sciences (SLU)
- 2010-11 OECD Co-operative Research Grant, IRTA-Barcelona
- 2002 Visiting Researcher, Wageningen University, the Netherlands
- 1995 Postdoctoral Fellowship, AUPELF-UREF INRA- Bordeaux
- 1992-1994 Postdoctoral NSERC Fellowship
- 1990-1991 Doctoral Scholarship, La Fondation de l'Université Laval
- 1989 FCAR Scholarship - Research training at the University of California, Davis
- 1988-1992 NSERC Scholarship - National Sciences & Engineering Research Council of Canada

== Selected Academic Publications ==
- Tomato (Solanum lycopersicum) health components: from the seed to the consumer. M Dorais, DL Ehret, AP Papadopoulos. Phytochemistry Reviews 7 (2), 231-250. 2008.
- Sink metabolism in tomato fruit: IV. Genetic and biochemical analysis of sucrose accumulation. S Yelle, RT Chetelat, M Dorais, JW DeVerna, AB Bennett. Plant Physiology 95 (4), 1026-1035. 1991.
- The use of supplemental lighting for vegetable crop production: light intensity, crop response, nutrition, crop management, cultural practices. M Dorais. Canadian Greenhouse Conference 9. 2003.
- Effects of supplemental light duration on greenhouse tomato (Lycopersicon esculentum Mill.) plants and fruit yields. DA Demers, M Dorais, CH Wien, A Gosselin. Scientia Horticulturae 74 (4), 295-306. 1998.
- The Effects of LED Daylength Extensions on the Daily Activity Patterns of a Greenhouse Biological Control Agent, Aphidius matricariae. JL Fraser, PK Abram, M Dorais. Entomologia Experimentalis et Applicata 174, no. 5: 398–410. (February 2026).
- Improving ecosystem services with alfalfa meal in highly intensive organic soil-based and soilless greenhouse systems. C Giard-Laliberté, G Madore-Millette and DE Pelster (June 2026).
