= Nataša Pavlović =

Serbian mathematician

Nataša Pavlović is a Serbian mathematician who works as a professor of mathematics at the University of Texas at Austin.

Her research concerns fluid dynamics and nonlinear dispersive partial differential equations. She is known for her work with Nets Katz pioneering an approach to constructing singularities in equations resembling the Navier–Stokes equations, by transferring a finite amount of energy through an infinitely decreasing sequence of time and length scales.

Pavlović earned a bachelor's degree in mathematics from the University of Belgrade in 1996, and completed her doctorate from the University of Illinois at Chicago in 2002 under the joint supervision of Susan Friedlander and Nets Katz. After temporary positions at the Clay Mathematics Institute, Princeton University, Institute for Advanced Study, and Mathematical Sciences Research Institute, she joined the Princeton faculty in 2005, and moved to the University of Texas in 2007.

She was a Sloan Research Fellow from 2008 to 2012. In 2015 she was elected as a fellow of the American Mathematical Society. From 2013-2015, Pavlović served as a Council Member at Large for the American Mathematical Society. She was elected a member of the American Academy of Arts and Sciences in 2026.
