= Agness Gidna =

Tanzanian paleontologist

- Born: Tanzania
- Education: University of Dar es Salaam, Complutense University of Madrid, University of Alcala
- Occupations: Paleontologist, Cultural Heritage specialist
- Known for: Olduvai Gorge Project

Agness Gidna is a Tanzanian paleontologist and a former Senior Curator of Paleontology at the National Museum of Tanzania. She is currently working with Ngorongoro Conservation Area as a Principal Cultural Heritage Officer. She is the first Tanzanian woman to hold a doctorate in Physical Anthropology and she is the first Tanzanian female research director at Olduvai Gorge, where she has been a co-principal investigator of the Olduvai Palaeoanthropology and Paleoecology Project (TOPPP) since 2017.

== Career ==
She graduated from the University of Dar es Salaam, Complutense University of Madrid (Spain), and the University of Alcala (Spain). She is a founder of the largest Pastoral Neolithic site in sub-Saharan Africa-(Luxmanda Site). She is a co-director of International research projects e.g. the Olduvai Gorge Project.

As Senior Curator of Paleontology at the National Museum of Tanzania, she has organized and curated two major exhibitions about human origin in Olduvai Gorge Museum, founded by Mary Leakey, and the National Museum of Tanzania. She gave tours to Samia Suluhu Hassan, Vice President of Tanzania in 2017 during the inauguration of the new Olduvai Gorge museum and to Monica Chakwera, First Lady of Malawi.

== Selected works ==
- Domínguez-Rodrigo, M., Baquedano, E., Díez Martín, F., Bunn, H. T., Pickering, T. R., Musiba, C., ... & Arriaza, M. D. C. (2012). La evolución conductual de los primeros Homo erectus (ergaster): estudio arqueológico y paleoecológico de los yacimientos antrópicos del lecho II de la Garganta de Olduvai: informe de la campaña de excavaciones en Olduvai. Año 2010.
- Domínguez-Rodrigo, Manuel; Pickering, Travis Rayne; Diez-Martín, Fernando; Mabulla, Audax; Musiba, Charles; Trancho, Gonzalo; Baquedano, Enrique; Bunn, Henry T.; Barboni, Doris; Santonja, Manuel; Uribelarrea, David (3 October 2012). "Earliest Porotic Hyperostosis on a 1.5-Million-Year-Old Hominin, Olduvai Gorge, Tanzania". PLOS ONE. 7 (10) e46414. Bibcode:2012PLoSO...746414D. doi:10.1371/journal.pone.0046414. ISSN 1932-6203. PMC 3463614. PMID 23056303.
- Gidna, A.; Yravedra, J.; Domínguez-Rodrigo, M. (2013). "A cautionary note on the use of captive carnivores to model wild predator behavior: A comparison of bone modification patterns on long bones by captive and wild lions". Journal of Archaeological Science. 40 (4): 1903–1910. Bibcode:2013JArSc..40.1903G. doi:10.1016/j.jas.2012.11.023.
- Gidna, A. O.; Domínguez-Rodrigo, M. (2013). "A method for reconstructing human femoral length from fragmented shaft specimens". Homo. 64 (1): 29–41. doi:10.1016/j.jchb.2012.09.006.
- Domínguez-Rodrigo, M., Bunn, H. T., Mabulla, A. Z., Baquedano, E., Uribelarrea del Val, D., Pérez-González, A., ... & Egeland, C. P. (2013). Did Homo erectus consume a Pelorovis herd at BK (Bed II, Olduvai Gorge)?.
- Gidna, A. O. (2019). "A comparative Study of Frontal Bone Morphology Among Pleistocene Hominin Fossils Group: A Study on Eyasi Hominin (EH6) Frontal Bone". Studies in the African Past. 12: 146–159.
- Grillo, Katherine; Prendergast, Mary; Gidna, Agness; Mabulla, Audax; Contreras, Daniel; The 84th Annual Meeting of the Society for American Archaeology (2019), The Communalities of Pastoralist Life: Perspectives on Household Organization at the Pastoral Neolithic site of Luxmanda, Tanzania
- Davies, TW; Alemseged, Z; Gidna, A; Hublin, JJ; Kimbel, WH; Kullmer, O; Spoor, F; Zanolli, C; Skinner, MM (2021). "Accessory cusp expression at the enamel-dentine junction of hominin mandibular molars". PeerJ. 9 e11415. doi:10.7717/peerj.11415. PMC 8141287. PMID 34055484.
