= Mikyoung Jun =

Korean-American statistician

Mikyoung Jun is a Korean-American statistician whose research topics have included the covariance of non-stationary spatial models, and applications in atmospheric science and climate modeling as well as to understanding the spatiotemporal patterns of global terrorism. She is ConocoPhillips Professor of Data Science in the Department of Mathematics of the University of Houston.

== Education and career ==
Jun earned a bachelor's degree in statistics from Seoul National University in 1999. She completed her PhD in 2005 at the University of Chicago; her dissertation, Space-Time Models and Their Application to Air Pollution, was supervised by Michael L. Stein.

She joined Texas A&M University as an assistant professor of statistics in 2005, earned tenure as an associate professor there in 2012, and was promoted to full professor in 2018. In 2020, she moved to the University of Houston as ConocoPhillips Professor of Data Science.

== Recognition ==
Jun won the Early Investigator Award of the American Statistical Association Section on Statistics and the Environment in 2014, "for her outstanding contributions to statistical models and methods for geophysical applications, including the development of covariance functions for spatial and spatio-temporal processes on spherical domains and of methods for assessing goodness-of-fit in spatial models; and for service to the profession".

She became an Elected Member of the International Statistical Institute in 2015, and was named a Fellow of the American Statistical Association in 2021, "for pathbreaking contributions to statistical modeling on spheres, innovative statistical applications to a broad range of environmental problems, service to the profession, and excellence in teaching and mentoring".
