= Idit Zehavi =

Israeli astrophysicist

- עדית זהבי
- Born: 1969 (age 56–57); Israel
- Education: Hebrew University of Jerusalem; University of Chicago
- Occupations: astrophysicist, astronomer
- Employer(s): Fermi National Accelerator Laboratory; University of Arizona; Case Western Reserve University

Idit Zehavi (Hebrew: עדית זהבי; born 1969) is an Israeli astrophysicist and researcher who discovered an anomaly in the mapping of the cosmos, which offered insight into how the universe is expanding. She is part of the team completing the Sloan Digital Sky Survey and is one of the world's most highly cited scientists according to the list published annually by Thomson Reuters.

== Biography ==
Idit Zehavi was born in Israel in 1969 and completed her education in Jerusalem, earning a PhD from the Racah Institute of Physics at the Hebrew University of Jerusalem in 1998. That same year, while researching the expansion of the universe, she and a senior colleague, Avishai Dekel, noted an anomaly in the cosmos which suggested that the portion of the galaxy where earth lies is expanding faster than the entirety of the universe. The findings were independently noted by another researcher, Adam Riess, from the University of California, Berkeley. Soon after, Zehavi moved to the United States to complete her post-doctorate studies in galaxy clustering at the University of Chicago and participate in research at the Fermi National Accelerator Laboratory. She left Fermilab in 2004 for the University of Arizona and continued working on the research of the Sloan Digital Sky Survey (SDSS). In 2005, she participated in research under the direction of Daniel Eisenstein, which detected "cosmic ripples", which confirmed the cosmological theory of the creation of the universe.

In 2006, she joined Case Western Reserve University of Cleveland, Ohio, as an Associate Professor in the Astronomy Department. In 2009, Zehavi was awarded a grant from the U.S. National Science Foundation to continue her work with the SDSS to expand her work on galaxy clustering to encompass a larger scale view of the universe. According to the annual listing produced by Thomson Reuters, Zehavi is one of the world's most highly cited scientists.

== Selected works ==
- Zaroubi, Saleem; Zehavi, Idit; Dekel, Avishai; et al. (September 1997). "Large-Scale Power Spectrum from Peculiar Velocities via Likelihood Analysis". The Astrophysical Journal. 486 (1): 21–31. arXiv:astro-ph/9610226. Bibcode:1997ApJ...486...21Z. doi:10.1086/304481. S2CID 1966279.
- Zehavi, Idit; Riess, Adam G; Kirshner, Robert P; Dekel, Avishai (1998). "A Local Hubble Bubble from Type 1a Supernovae". The Astrophysical Journal. 503 (2): 483. arXiv:astro-ph/9802252. Bibcode:1998ApJ...503..483Z. doi:10.1086/306015. S2CID 122223606.
- Zehavi, Idit; Blanton, Michael R; Frieman, Joshua A; et al. (2002). "Galaxy Clustering in Early Sloan Digital Sky Survey Redshift Data". The Astrophysical Journal. 571 (1): 172–190. arXiv:astro-ph/0106476. Bibcode:2002ApJ...571..172Z. doi:10.1086/339893. S2CID 119067270.
- Zehavi, Idit; Zheng, Zheng; Weinberg, David H; et al. (2005). "The Luminosity and Color Dependence of the Galaxy Correlation Function". The Astrophysical Journal. 630 (1): 1–27. arXiv:astro-ph/0408569v2. Bibcode:2005ApJ...630....1Z. doi:10.1086/431891. S2CID 14702969.
- Zehavi, Idit; Eisenstein, Daniel J; Nichol, Robert C; et al. (2005). "The Intermediate-Scale Clustering of Luminous Red Galaxies". The Astrophysical Journal. 621 (1): 22–31. arXiv:astro-ph/0411557. Bibcode:2005ApJ...621...22Z. doi:10.1086/427495. S2CID 14364108.
- Eisenstein, Daniel J; Zehavi, Idit; Hogg, David W; et al. (October–November 2005). "Detection of the Baryon Acoustic Peak in the Large-Scale Correlation Function of SDSS Luminous Red Galaxies". The Astrophysical Journal. 633 (2): 560–574. arXiv:astro-ph/0501171. Bibcode:2005ApJ...633..560E. doi:10.1086/466512. S2CID 4834543.
- Sheth, Ravi K; Zehavi, Idit (April 2009). "Linear theory and velocity correlations of clusters". Monthly Notices of the Royal Astronomical Society. 394 (3): 1459–1462. arXiv:0812.1037. Bibcode:2009MNRAS.394.1459S. doi:10.1111/j.1365-2966.2008.14326.x. S2CID 15189300.
- Guo, Hong; Zehavi, Idit; Zheng, Zheng (September–October 2012). "A New Method to Correct for Fiber Collisions in Galaxy Two-Point Statistics". The Astrophysical Journal. 756 (2): 127. arXiv:1111.6598. Bibcode:2012ApJ...756..127G. doi:10.1088/0004-637X/756/2/127. S2CID 118588769.
- Guo, Hong; Zehavi, Idit; Zheng, Zheng; et al. (2013). "The clustering of galaxies in the SDSS-III Baryon Oscillation Spectroscopic Survey: Luminosity and Color Dependence and Redshift Evolution". The Astrophysical Journal. 767 (2): 122. arXiv:1212.1211. Bibcode:2013ApJ...767..122G. doi:10.1088/0004-637X/767/2/122. S2CID 118440688.
- Guo, Hong; Zheng, Zheng; Zehavi, Idit; et al. (January 2014). "The clustering of galaxies in the SDSS-III Baryon Oscillation Spectroscopic Survey: modeling of the luminosity and colour dependence in the Data Release 10". Monthly Notices of the Royal Astronomical Society. 441 (3): 2398–2413. arXiv:1401.3009. Bibcode:2014MNRAS.441.2398G. doi:10.1093/mnras/stu763. S2CID 17587047.
