= Alice K. Jacobs =

American physician

Alice K. Jacobs is an emeritus Professor of Medicine at the Boston University Chobanian & Avedisian School of Medicine. She specializes in interventional cardiology, coronary revascularization, and sex-based differences in cardiovascular disease.

She holds a BA from State University of New York at Buffalo and an MD from Saint Louis University School of Medicine. At BU, she was Director of the Cardiac Catheterization Laboratories and Interventional Cardiology for 20 years until 2011. She currently is Vice Chair for Clinical Affairs in the Department of Medicine at Boston University Medical Center and maintains an active clinical practice.

Jacobs was President of the American Heart Association (2004 - 2005). She has also served as chair of the American College of Cardiology/American Heart Association Task Force on Practice Guidelines. On April 20, 2009, she was awarded the Gold Heart Award by the American Heart Association for her contributions to health. She was president of the Association of University Cardiologists in 2011. She is a Master Fellow of the Society for Cardiovascular Angiography and Interventions (SCAI). She is a Fellow of the American Heart Association and the American College of Cardiology.

== Works ==
In mid-2024, she had published over 600 research articles, with a D-index of 140.

- Mendirichaga, Rodrigo; Jacobs, Alice K. (2020-03-30). "Sex Differences in Ischemic Heart Disease-the Paradox Persists". JAMA Cardiology. 5 (7): 754–756. doi:10.1001/jamacardio.2020.0819. ISSN 2380-6591. PMID 32227138. S2CID 214733422.
- Al-Lamee, Rasha; Jacobs, Alice K. (2020-08-11). "ISCHEMIA Trial: Was It Worth the Wait?". Circulation. 142 (6): 517–519. doi:10.1161/CIRCULATIONAHA.120.045007. ISSN 1524-4539. PMID 32316761.
- King, Spencer B.; Smith, Sidney C.; Hirshfeld, John W.; Jacobs, Alice K.; Morrison, Douglass A.; Williams, David O.; Smith, Sidney C.; Feldman, Ted E.; Hirshfeld, John W.; Jacobs, Alice K.; Kern, Morton J.; King, Spencer B.; Morrison, Douglass A.; O’Neill, William W.; Schaff, Hartzell V.; Whitlow, Patrick L.; Williams, David O.; Smith, Sidney C.; Jacobs, Alice K.; Adams, Cynthia D.; Anderson, Jeffrey L.; Buller, Christopher E.; Creager, Mark A.; Ettinger, Steven M.; Halperin, Jonathan L.; Hunt, Sharon A.; Krumholz, Harlan M.; Kushner, Frederick G.; Lytle, Bruce W.; Nishimura, Rick; Page, Richard L.; Riegel, Barbara; Tarkington, Lynn G.; Yancy, Clyde W. (15 January 2008). "2007 Focused Update of the ACC/AHA/SCAI 2005 Guideline Update for Percutaneous Coronary Intervention: A Report of the American College of Cardiology/American Heart Association Task Force on Practice Guidelines: 2007 Writing Group to Review New Evidence and Update the ACC/AHA/SCAI 2005 Guideline Update for Percutaneous Coronary Intervention, Writing on Behalf of the 2005 Writing Committee". Circulation. 117 (2): 261–295. doi:10.1161/CIRCULATIONAHA.107.188208. PMID 18079354.
- Cerqueira, Manuel D.; Weissman, Neil J.; Dilsizian, Vasken; Jacobs, Alice K.; Kaul, Sanjiv; Laskey, Warren K.; Pennell, Dudley J.; Rumberger, John A.; Ryan, Thomas; Verani, Mario S. (29 January 2002). "Standardized Myocardial Segmentation and Nomenclature for Tomographic Imaging of the Heart: A Statement for Healthcare Professionals From the Cardiac Imaging Committee of the Council on Clinical Cardiology of the American Heart Association". Circulation. 105 (4): 539–542. doi:10.1161/hc0402.102975. PMID 11815441. S2CID 39323991.
