= Leonie Walsh =

Australian scientist and STEMM ambassador

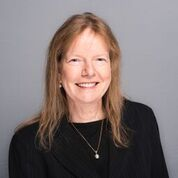
- Education: Swinburne University

Leonie Walsh is a fellow of the Australian Academy of Technological Sciences, and was the first Lead Scientist in Victoria, from 2013 to 2016, as well as the inaugural Women in STEMM Ambassador and the first women president of Australasian Industrial Research Group She was the representative for Victoria on the Forum of Australian Chief Scientists. Walsh received an honorary Doctorate (HonDUniv) due to her contributions in leadership to scientific enterprises, innovation and community leadership, from Swinburne University of Technology. Walsh was a judge in the Westpac 100 Women of Influence awards in 2016.

== Early life ==
Walsh was raised in a rural town and developed an early interest in mathematics and chemistry. She attended Mildura Technical School, where she was encouraged by her chemistry, physics and maths teachers. Walsh was diagnosed with chronic myeloid leukemia in 1998, and received a bone marrow transplant from her sister, Susan. Leonie joined the Bone Marrow Donor Institute (BMDI) shortly after the bone marrow transplant to provide support back to patients and families in need. After a break from BMDI, due to overseas work commitments, Leonie re-joined the board of the Fight Cancer Foundation (Formerly BMDI). Leonie continued on the board for three years before being appointed as the president and chairman of the Fight Cancer Foundation in early 2015 with a related role on the Board of the Australian Bone Marrow Donor Registry.

== Career ==
Leonie Walsh is an adviser in technological innovation with a background that spans more than 30 years of experience across a diverse range of industries and applications with companies including Visy, South East Water and Henkel in Victoria and internationally for Dow Chemical.

She was the first Lead Scientist in Victoria from 2013–2016. In this capacity Leonie was a contributing member on the Future Industries Ministerial Advisory Council, provided contributions to the Education State activities and STEM plan via the Tech Schools STEM Future Industries Advisory Panel, represented Victoria on the Forum of Australian Chief Scientists and participated on a range of government and industry advisory committees and funding assessment panels spanning innovation, education, new energy, ICT and advanced manufacturing.

Walsh holds a BSc and an MSc from Swinburne University, an MBA from the Australian Graduate School of Management and is a Fellow of the Australian Academy of Technological Sciences and Engineering. Dr Walsh also received an Honorary Doctorate from Swinburne University of Technology for contributions to Science, Innovation and the Community.

Walsh’s most recent focus has been in the renewable energy and Clean Technology sectors with current roles including the Chair of the Board for the Center for New Energy Technologies (C4NET), member of AusNet Services Commercial Energy Services Forum and Board member of the Victorian Cleantech Cluster and Victorian Clean Technology Fund. She has also worked on energy storage and new energy technologies with organisations such as ACOLA, on the "Opportunities of energy storage and deployment" in Australia.

== STEMM careers advocacy ==
Walsh is also an advocate of women in STEM, a mentor for IMNIS, and was an invited guest speaker on leadership in STEM. She has spoken in the media multiple times, advocating the careers of women in technology and science. She has spoken on exploring different science careers in a Changing Science event for Science Week at the University of Melbourne. She is an advocate of mentoring, and attracting and retaining more women in STEMM careers. She also speaks on breaking down stereotypes between science and technology careers across industry and academia.

== Awards, honours and recognition ==
- 2016 – 2019 – Women in STEMM Australia's inaugural ambassador.
- 2016 – Judge of ANZ Sunraysia Daily Mildura Innovation awards.
- 2015 – Chair and President of Fight Cancer Foundation.
- 2014 – Honorary Doctorate of the University, Swinburne University of Technology
- 2013 – 2016 Inaugural Lead Scientist for the Victorian Government
- 2012 – Fellow of the Academy of Technology and Engineering
