= Hanhee Paik =

South Korean quantum computing researcher

Hanhee Paik is a South Korean experimental quantum computing researcher who works for IBM Research at the Thomas J. Watson Research Center, where she helps develop superconducting devices for storing and operating on qubits.

== Education and career ==
Paik has a master's degree from Yonsei University in South Korea, and completed a doctorate at the University of Maryland, College Park.

After postdoctoral research at the University of Maryland Laboratory for Physical Sciences, she took on another postdoctoral position at Yale University where she continued research in coherence and materials. In 2012, she left academia to become a researcher for BNN Technology PLC, specializing in quantum computing research. In 2014, she began her current position at IBM research. At IBM, her work has been included in the IBM Quantum Experience and IBM Q System One projects. As a Senior Research Scientist in quantum computing and quantum ecosystem development, she is continually developing new qubit architectures whilst also leading technical projects.

Paik's advancements pave a path forward within the industry of superconducting quantum computing for commercialization. Her invention proved that it is possible to commercialize superconducting quantum computing. Ten years later, IBM is running on average, 2 billion servers per day as a result of Paik's discoveries.

== Recognition ==
In 2021, Paik was named a Fellow of the American Physical Society (APS), after a nomination from the APS Forum on Industrial & Applied Physics, "for pioneering a novel superconducting qubit architecture that catalyzed the commercialization of superconducting quantum computing, and for contributions to advance quantum computing research in the industry".
