= Elizabeth Nance =

American chemical engineer

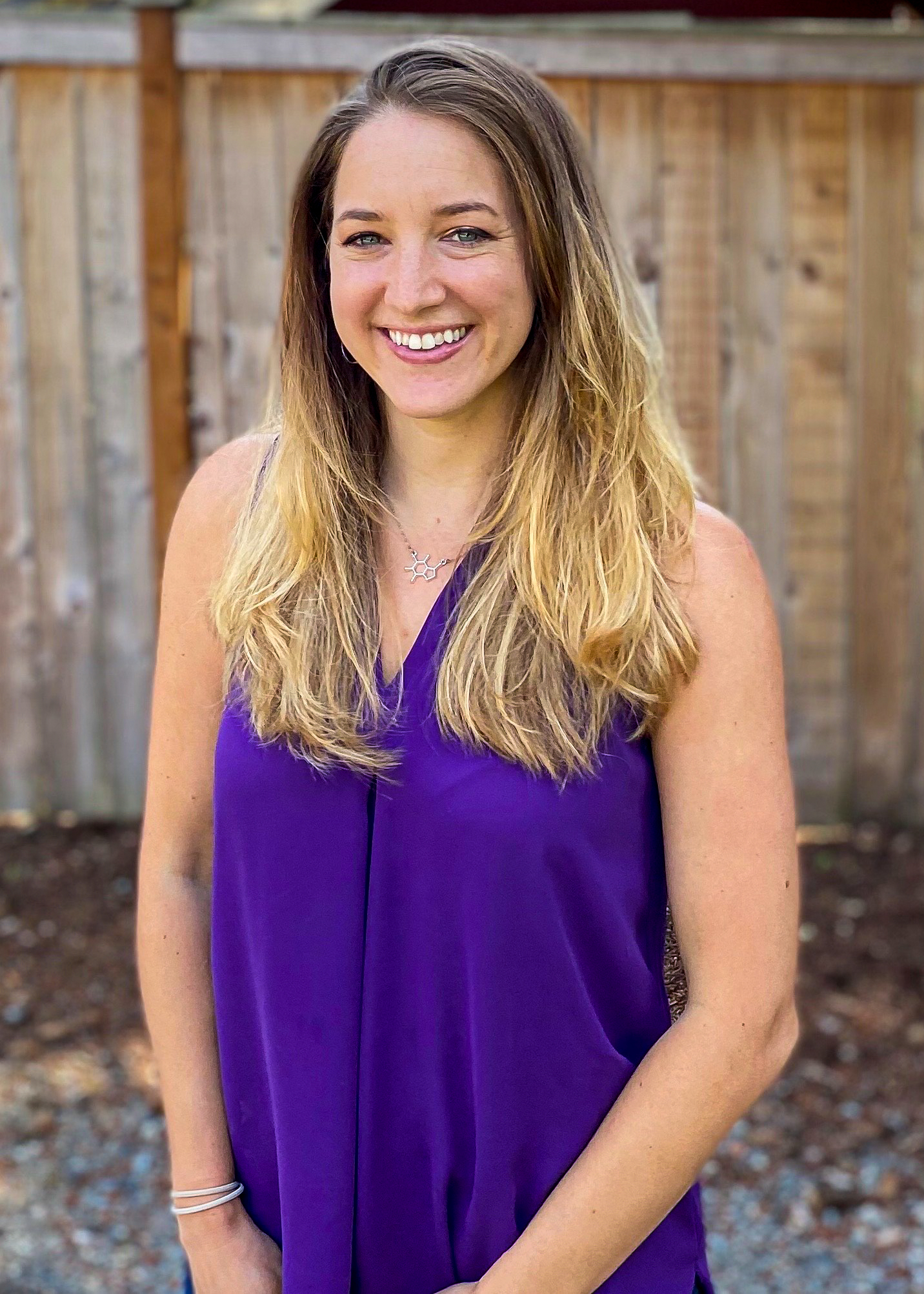
- Nance in 2020
- Citizenship: American
- Education: B.S., North Carolina State University, 2006; PhD, Johns Hopkins University, 2012
- Scientific career
- Doctoral advisor: Justin Hanes, PhD

Elizabeth Nance is an American chemical engineer. She has held the Clare Boothe Luce Assistant Professorship at the University of Washington since September 2015. Her primary research interests are "disease-directed engineering, nanomedicine-based and nanometabolic-based platform development, systems thinking to assess and model therapeutic barriers in treating disease, and biological transport phenomena".

== Education ==
Nance earned her bachelor of science degree in chemical and biomolecular engineering at North Carolina State University in 2006 and her PhD in chemical engineering at Johns Hopkins University (JHU) in 2012. She then did postdoctoral work at JHU. 'Forbes 30 under 30 in Science and Medicine' named her the "most disruptive, game-changing and innovative young personalities in science".

Dr. Kenneth Ford credited Nance with developing "the first nanoparticles that can penetrate deep within the brain" while she was working on her doctorate. Such particles can "successfully target specific regions and cells within the brain" and what changes might affect a drug's usefulness and develop ways to overcome barriers. This required getting past what is called the blood-brain barrier, which requires a multidisciplinary team effort.

== Honors and awards ==
Nance was awarded the PECASE (Presidential Early Career Awards for Scientists and Engineers) award in 2019. On 15 May 2016, she was one of the TED conference speakers on the topic "In Motion". This talk focused on changes in human activity in Seattle. She was named by Forbes Magazine as one of the "30 Under 30 for Science & Medicine" in 2015. Her other awards include:

- Controlled Release Society Paper of the Year (2015)
- Burroughs Wellcome Fund Career Award at Scientific Interfaces Awardee (2014-2019)
- Johns Hopkins Center for Nanomedicine Award for Research Excellence (2014, 2013)
- Society of Critical Care Medicine Annual Scientific Award (2014)
- Anesthesiology/Critical Care Medicine Annual Research Award (2013)
- Hartwell Foundation Fellowship (2013-2015)
