= Muskoka Lakes Association =

- Type: Non-Profit
- Founded: 1894 in Muskoka, Ontario, Canada
- Headquarters: Muskoka Lakes, Ontario, Canada
- Area served: District of Muskoka
- Website: https://www.mla.on.ca/

Muskoka Lakes Association ("MLA") was established in 1894 in what is now the District of Muskoka on Ontario, Canada. It is Canada's oldest continuously operating cottage association. The MLA represents cottagers' interests in a variety of manners designed to promote the responsible enjoyment and conservation of the lakes in Muskoka.

== Geographic Territory ==
The MLA is based in Port Carling, the seat of the Township of Muskoka Lakes, but MLA is considerably older than the Township of Muskoka Lakes, which bears a similar name; its endeavors are not limited to the geographic area of the Township. MLA operates throughout the district of Muskoka covering the approximately 1600 lakes in all six Area Municipalities: Georgian Bay, Muskoka Lakes, Lake of Bays, Huntsville, Bracebridge, and Gravenhurst.

== Activities ==
MLA's activities can be divided into two main categories: political and social. MLA represents cottagers' (mostly waterfront property owners') political interests at both the District and Town or Township ("Area Municipalities") level, reporting regularly to its constituents. Politically, the MLA is actively involved in water quality issues., taxation, and development planning. Socially, MLA sponsors events throughout the year, including regattas, sporting events, agricultural events, and the Antique Boat Show in Gravenhurst. Specific recurring events include:

- Seedling Day
- Antique Boat Show
- Aquatic Regatta
- Mixed Bonspiel
- Sailing Regatta

== Size ==
MLA has approximately 200 volunteers serving 13,000 cottage members
