= Jane Grimwood =

British microbiologist

Jane Grimwood is a British microbiologist.

== Early life and education ==
Grimwood was born in England. Her father was a chemist, and she always wanted to be a scientist as a child. Grimwood was awarded her B.Sc. and Ph.D. in Microbiology from the University of Leeds in the United Kingdom. She did postdoctoral research at the University of Oxford, University of San Francisco and Dartmouth College.

== Career ==
=== Human Genome Project ===
Grimwood was an important part of the Human Genome Project effort, working from the Stanford Human Genome Center. Grimwood stated, "I feel very lucky to have been a part of the Human Genome Project. It was arguably the best international collaborative project of our lifetime." She and her team worked on sequencing and analyzing chromosomes 5, 16, and 19 -- "320 million base pairs . . . comprising more than 10% of the human genome." They discovered that chromosome 19 has the highest gene density of any human chromosome, and were able to link certain genes on the chromosome to genetic diseases including insulin-resistant diabetes.

=== Current work ===
Since the Human Genome Project finished in 2008, Grimwood has led a group of researchers who focus on sequencing and finishing a group of eukaryotic genomes that include fungi, plants, and vertebrates. The lab focuses on the genomes of organisms relevant to the development of sustainable biofuels and global food security. Organisms they have worked on with this goal include "the American poplar, the hardy perennial grass, switchgrass and soybean."

Currently, she is the co-director of the Genome Sequencing Center and Faculty Investigator at the HudsonAlpha Institute for Biotechnology.

In August 2015, the National Science Foundation awarded a $2.4 million grant jointly to a group of five researchers, including Grimwood, to further genomics research involving Upland cotton.
