= Seetha Coleman-Kammula =

Indian chemist, environmentalist, and entrepreneur

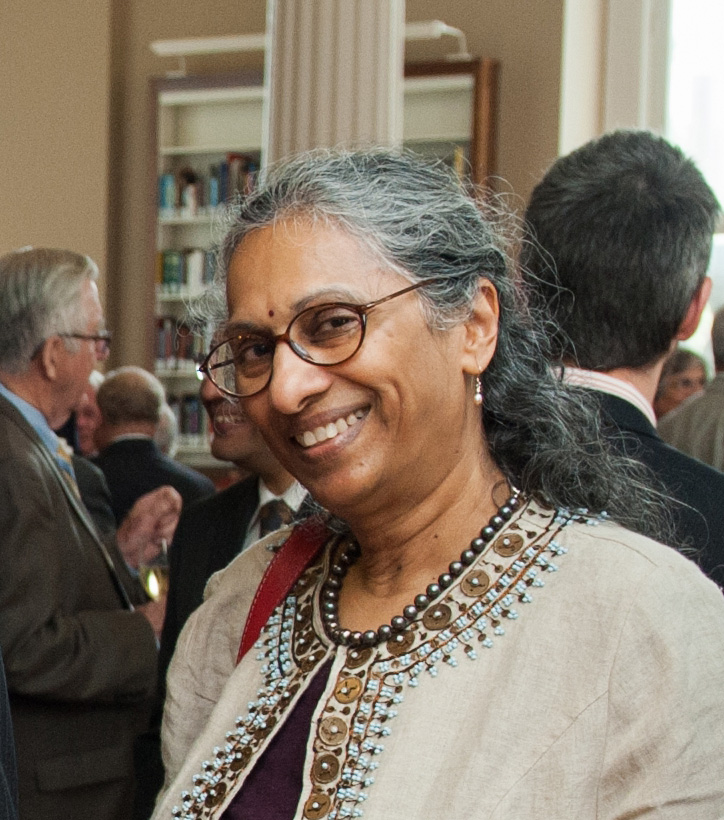
- Chemical Heritage Foundation, 2014
- Education: Osmania University; Auburn University
- Occupations: Chemist, environmentalist
- Employer(s): Royal Dutch Shell; Basell Polyolefins; Simply Sustain LLC
- Spouse: Brian Coleman

Seetha Coleman-Kammula is an Indian chemist, environmentalist and entrepreneur. After over 25 years working in the petrochemical industry developing plastics, she began an environmental consulting firm in 2005. Her firm focuses on industrial ecology and assessment of the life cycle of products so that they are manufactured in processes that are environmentally aware of the future impact of waste products.

== Biography ==
Seetha Coleman-Kammula in India and attended her undergraduate studies at Osmania University of Hyderabad, India. She went on to pursue a PhD in organic chemistry from Auburn University in Auburn, Alabama and then did her post-graduate research at Princeton University. She was awarded a NATO Fellowship and completed additional studies at the University of Amsterdam. In 1978, she was hired as a researcher at Royal Dutch Shell in Amsterdam where she worked until 1988. After ten years, she moved with Shell to England where she worked as a business development manager. Later Coleman-Kammula transferred to both Belgium and Houston, Texas, as the head of the epoxy resins unit creating plastics. In 2000, she left Shell and became a senior vice president at Basell Polyolefins, where she focused on asset management, innovation and strategic marketing. She also served on the Board of Directors of Indelpro, a joint venture between Basell and Alfa in Mexico.

In 2005, Coleman-Kammula left Bassell and founded Simply Sustain, a consulting firm aimed at advising businesses on more sustainable models. After a trip to India around that time, Coleman-Kammula realized that the plastics she had helped develop were negatively impacting the environment because as an inventor and designer she had never considered what happened when the product was no longer usable and became waste. She now consults with firms recommending that they supply the information of what is in their products and how to disassemble them, both as a means of protecting the environment and providing jobs in disposal and recycling. She promotes "industrial ecology" and recommends that corporate entities make environmental impact assessments over the life cycle of products as a means of increasing value of products and decreasing the negative impacts to the environment. She works on the Sustainability External Advisory Council of Dow Chemical Company and with other corporate entities.

== Bibliography ==
- Hardman, Guillermo (John) (April 2009). Regenerative Leadership: An Integral Theory for Transforming People and Organizations for Sustainability in Business, Education and Community (PhD). Boca Raton, Florida: Florida Atlantic University.
- Senge, Peter M.; Smith, Bryan; Kruschwitz, Nina; Laur, Joe; Schley, Sara (10 June 2008). The Necessary Revolution: How Individuals And Organizations Are Working Together to Create a Sustainable World. Crown Publishing Group. ISBN 978-0-385-52530-5.
