= Dorath Pinto Uchôa =

Brazilian archaeologist

Dorath Pinto Uchôa (1 November 1947 – 28 March 2014) was a Brazilian archaeologist and one of the founders of Brazilian Society of Archaeology. She specialized in the study of prehistoric coastal human settlements with a special emphasis on the study of prehistoric middens in the State of São Paulo, Brazil.

== Biography ==
In 1967, she obtained a degree in Geography from the Pontificia Catholic University of São Paulo. She earned a master's degree in history in 1972 and a PhD in anthropology, Archaeology, and Ethnology, in 1972, both from the University of São Paulo, with a thesis titled: "Arqueologia de Piaçaguera e Tenório: Análise de dois tipos de sítios pré-cerâmicos de Litoral Paulista".

During her training as archaeologist, she studied middens located in Piaçaguera, near the municipality of Cubatão, close to the port of Santos. She spent part of her career in the Instituto de Pré-História. She became professor of the Museum of Archaeology and Ethnology of the University of São Paulo.

== Scientific publications ==
=== Books ===
- Clássicos da Arqueologia. Erechim, RS: Habilis. 224 pp. 2007
- Arqueologia de Piaçagüera e Tenório: análise de dois tipos de sítios pré-cerâmicos do litoral paulista. Clássicos da Arqueologia. Editor Habilis, 221 pp. 2007
- O sítio arqueológico Mar Virado, Ubatuba: relatório. Editor Museu de Arqueologia e Etnologia, 32 pp. 1999
- Demografia esqueletal dos construtores do sambaqui de Piaçaguera, São Paulo, Brasil. Vol. 1.230 pp. ed. São Paulo: Grafons, 1988

=== Articles ===
- Ilha do Mar Virado: um estudo de um sítio arqueológico no litoral do Estado de São Paulo. CLIO. Série Arqueológica (UFPE), vol. 24, pp. 7–40, 2009
- Presença de Fungos na dentina humana: implicaçãoes arqueológicas e forenses. Rev. de Odontologia da Pós Graduação da Faculdade de Odontologia da Usp, São Paulo, vol. 11, Nº 3, 2004
- Estimativa da idade através da análise do desgaste oclusal em molares de remanescentes esqueléticos arqueológicos brasileiros. RPG. Rev. de Pós-Graduação (USP), São Paulo, vol. 11, Nº. 3, 2004
- A Ilha Comprida e o Litoral de Cananéia sob a ótica arqueológica e geoambiental. Revista Clio Arqueológica, UFPE -Recife, vol. 1, Nº. 15, 2002
- Fungal infiltration in the human dentine: archaeology and forensic implications (poster). 14th European Meeting of the Paleopathology Association, Coimbra, pp. 116–116, 2002
- Estimativa de idade em remanescentes esqueléticos arqueológicos pela análise do desgaste oclusal em molares. Pesquisa Odontológica Brasileira, São Paulo, vol. 16, pp. 86–86, 2002
- A Ilha Comprida e o Litoral de Cananéia sob a ótica arqueológica e geoambiental. Rev. Clio Arqueológica, UFPE -Recife, vol. 1, Nº. 15, 2002
- Presença de fungos na dentina humana: possíveis implicações arqueológicas e forenses. RPG. Rev. de Pós-Graduação (USP), São Paulo, vol. 8, pp. 260–260, 2001
- Hiperosteose Porosa Em Cranios de Indios e Mulatos do Sudeste Brasileiro: Correlacao Entre As Lesoes Na Calvaria e Na Orbita. Revista do Museu de Arqueologia e Etnologia, 1996
- Coletores-pescadores do Litoral Meridional Brasileiro. Revista de Pré História, Sãao Paulo, vol. 6, pp. 103–106, 1984

== Honours ==
- 2000: homage by the Conselho National de Mulheres Do Brazil
- 1997: homage by the Instituto de Pré-História
- 1996: medal of the Municipal Government of Cubatão
- 1995: homage of the Society of Brazilian Archaeology
- 1988: medal Martim Afonso de Souza
