= Cathie Sherrington =

Healthy ageing researcher and physiotherapist

Cathie Sherrington FAHMS is an Australian physiotherapist who is an expert in fall prevention and physical activity promotion. She is the deputy director of the Institute for Musculoskeletal Health, a research collaboration between the University of Sydney and Sydney Local Health District, where she is the lead researcher of the Physical Activity, Ageing and Disability Research stream, co-leader of the Global Fragility Fracture and an National Health and Medical Research Council Leadership Fellow. She is a professor at the University of Sydney School of Public Health in the Faculty of Medicine and Health and president of the Australia and New Zealand Fall Prevention Society and leads the Centre of Research Excellence in the Prevention of Fall-related Injuries.

Sherrington started her career working as a physiotherapist in rehabilitation and aged care settings before going on to complete a Masters in Public Health and Post Doctoral degree. Over her academic career she has published over 379 documents and has a h-index of 75. Her main areas of interest include physical activity promotion and falls prevention strategies and exercise interventions for older people and people with chronic disabilities.

== Awards ==
In 2023. Sherrington was awarded the NSW Premier's Prize for Science & Engineering, Category 3: Excellence in Medical Biological Sciences (Cell and molecular, medical veterinary and genetics). She was elected as a Fellow of the Australian Academy of Health and Medical Sciences and College in 2017 and a Fellow of the Australian College of Physiotherapists in 2023.

== Selected publications ==
- Sherrington, Catherine; Michaleff, Zoe A; Fairhall, Nicola; Paul, Serene S; Tiedemann, Anne; Whitney, Julie; Cumming, Robert G; Herbert, Robert D; Close, Jacqueline C T; Lord, Stephen R (December 2017). "Exercise to prevent falls in older adults: an updated systematic review and meta-analysis". British Journal of Sports Medicine. 51 (24): 1750–1758. doi:10.1136/bjsports-2016-096547. ISSN 0306-3674. PMC 6243488. PMID 27707740.
- Fairhall, Nicola J; Dyer, Suzanne M; Mak, Jenson CS; Diong, Joanna; Kwok, Wing S; Sherrington, Catherine (2022-09-07). Cochrane Bone, Joint and Muscle Trauma Group (ed.). "Interventions for improving mobility after hip fracture surgery in adults". Cochrane Database of Systematic Reviews. 2022 (9) CD001704. doi:10.1002/14651858.CD001704.pub5. PMC 9451000. PMID 36070134.
- Montero-Odasso, Manuel; van der Velde, Nathalie; Martin, Finbarr C; Petrovic, Mirko; Tan, Maw Pin; Ryg, Jesper; Aguilar-Navarro, Sara; Alexander, Neil B; Becker, Clemens; Blain, Hubert; Bourke, Robbie; Cameron, Ian D; Camicioli, Richard; Clemson, Lindy; Close, Jacqueline (2022-09-02). "World guidelines for falls prevention and management for older adults: a global initiative". Age and Ageing. 51 (9). doi:10.1093/ageing/afac205. ISSN 0002-0729. PMC 9523684. PMID 36178003.
- Sherrington, Catherine; Tiedemann, Anne; Fairhall, Nicola J; Hopewell, Sally; Michaleff, Zoe A; Howard, Kirsten; Clemson, Lindy; Lamb, Sarah E (2016-11-04). Cochrane Bone, Joint and Muscle Trauma Group (ed.). "Exercise for preventing falls in older people living in the community". Cochrane Database of Systematic Reviews. doi:10.1002/14651858.CD012424.
- S Oliveira, Juliana; Gilbert, Stephen; Pinheiro, Marina B; Tiedemann, Anne; Macedo, Liane Brito; Maia, Laísa; Kwok, Wing; Hassett, Leanne; Sherrington, Catherine (February 2023). "Effect of sport on health in people aged 60 years and older: a systematic review with meta-analysis". British Journal of Sports Medicine. 57 (4): 230–236. doi:10.1136/bjsports-2022-105820. ISSN 0306-3674. PMC 9933166. PMID 36450439.
- Sherrington, Cathie; Fairhall, Nicola; Wallbank, Geraldine; Tiedemann, Anne; Michaleff, Zoe A; Howard, Kirsten; Clemson, Lindy; Hopewell, Sally; Lamb, Sarah (August 2020). "Exercise for preventing falls in older people living in the community: an abridged Cochrane systematic review". British Journal of Sports Medicine. 54 (15): 885–891. doi:10.1136/bjsports-2019-101512. ISSN 0306-3674. PMID 31792067.
- Ardern, Clare L; Büttner, Fionn; Andrade, Renato; Weir, Adam; Ashe, Maureen C; Holden, Sinead; Impellizzeri, Franco M; Delahunt, Eamonn; Dijkstra, H Paul; Mathieson, Stephanie; Rathleff, Michael Skovdal; Reurink, Guus; Sherrington, Catherine; Stamatakis, Emmanuel; Vicenzino, Bill (February 2022). "Implementing the 27 PRISMA 2020 Statement items for systematic reviews in the sport and exercise medicine, musculoskeletal rehabilitation and sports science fields: the PERSiST (implementing Prisma in Exercise, Rehabilitation, Sport medicine and SporTs science) guidance". British Journal of Sports Medicine. 56 (4): 175–195. doi:10.1136/bjsports-2021-103987. ISSN 0306-3674. PMC 8862073. PMID 34625401.

== Books and book chapters ==
In 2021, Stephen Lord, Cathie Sherrington and Vasi Naganathan authored the book Falls in Older People. She has also authored the following book chapters:

1. Exercise to maximise postural control and reduce the risk of falls in older age in Locomotion and Posture in Older Adults: The Role of Aging and Movement Disorders.
2. Rehabilitation Following Hip Fracture in Orthogeriatrics.
3. Strategies to Promote Uptake and Adherence to Fall Prevention Programmes in Falls in Older People.
