= Atya Kapley =

Indian environmental geneticist (born 1965)

- Born: Atya Zafar; 19 January 1965 (age 61); Hyderabad, India
- Education: University of Hyderabad
- Known for: Vice President of the Organisation for Women In Science for the Developing World
- Scientific career
- Fields: Biotechnolgy and Genomics
- Workplaces: CSIR-NEERI, Nagpur, India
- Doctoral advisor: R V Thampan

Atya Kapley is an Indian environmental geneticist who is the Asia & Pacific coordinator and vice president for the Organisation for Women In Science for the Developing World. Kapley is senior principal scientist and head of the Director's Research cell of the CSIR National Environmental Engineering Research Institute in Nagpur. In 2000 the Association of Microbiologists of India gave Kapley the Young Scientist Award for her work in the field of environmental microbiology. In 2008 Atya Kapley was presented with the Women Scientist Award by the Biotech Research Society of India. As part of her support for the Organisation for Women In Science for the Developing World Kapley has organised conferences and workshops.

== Academic career ==
After studying for a BSc at the Osmania University, Hyderabad, Kapley moved to University of Rookee to study for an MSc in biosciences. This was followed by PhD studies at the University of Hyderabad researching endogenous factors that regulate the DNA binding of the receptor-estrogen complex in rat and goat uteri. Having completed her PhD, Kapley took a post at CSIR National Environmental Engineering Research Institute as a senior project fellow and after a series of promotions is now senior principal scientist and head of the Director's Research Cell.

== Research interests ==
Kapley's early studies investigated estrogen receptors. After moving to CSIR National Environmental Engineering Research Institute Kapley switched to studying the use of microorganisms to reduce pollution in factory waste. Recently Kapley has also studied how individual genetics can affect response to treatment of Chronic Myeloid Leukemia. She has also studied how anaerobic digestion of kitchen waste is affected by commonly used spices. As part of her role at CSIR National Environmental Engineering Research Institute, Kapley guides PhD students and MSc students who are linked to Nagpur University.

== Awards and memberships ==
- In 1997 Kapley became a Life Member of the Association of Microbiologists of India.
- In 2000 Kapley won the Young Scientist Award from the Association of Microbiologists of India.
- In 2008 Kapley was presented with the Women Scientist Award by the Biotech Research Society of India.
- In 2016 Atya Kapley became vice president for the Organisation for Women In Science for the Developing World.
