= Esmaeilzadeh =

Esmaeilzadeh (Persian: اسماعیل‌زاده, lit. "offspring of Ishmael") is an Iranian surname which can also be found in the Iranian diaspora. Notable people with the surname include:

- Afshin Esmaeilzadeh (born 1992), Iranian football midfielder
- Amirhossein Esmaeilzadeh (born 2000), Iranian footballer
- Farnaz Esmaeilzadeh (born 1988), Iranian speed climber
- Mojtaba Esmaeilzadeh (born 1990), Iranian footballer
- Mouna Esmaeilzadeh (born 1980), Iranian doctor, neuroscientist, entrepreneur, and TV personality
- Saeid Esmaeilzadeh (born 1974), Swedish chemist
