= Women in science (disambiguation) =

Women in science refers to the contributions of women to the field of science.

Women in science may also refer to:

- Women in STEM fields, women in the fields of Science, Technology, Engineering, and Mathematics
- Organization for Women in Science for the Developing World, international forum that awards fellowships in science
