= Carenco =

Carenco is a French surname. Notable people with the surname include:

- Jean-François Carenco (born 1952), French politician
- Sophie Carenco (fl. 2008), French scientist

== See also ==
- Carencro, Louisiana
