= Kenmoe =

Kenmoe or Kenmoé is a surname. Notable people with the surname include:

- Anouk Aimee Takam Kenmoe (born 1979), Cameroonian footballer
- Germaine Djuidjé Kenmoé (born 1973), Cameroonian physicist
