= Marian Asantewah Nkansah =

Ghanaian scientist

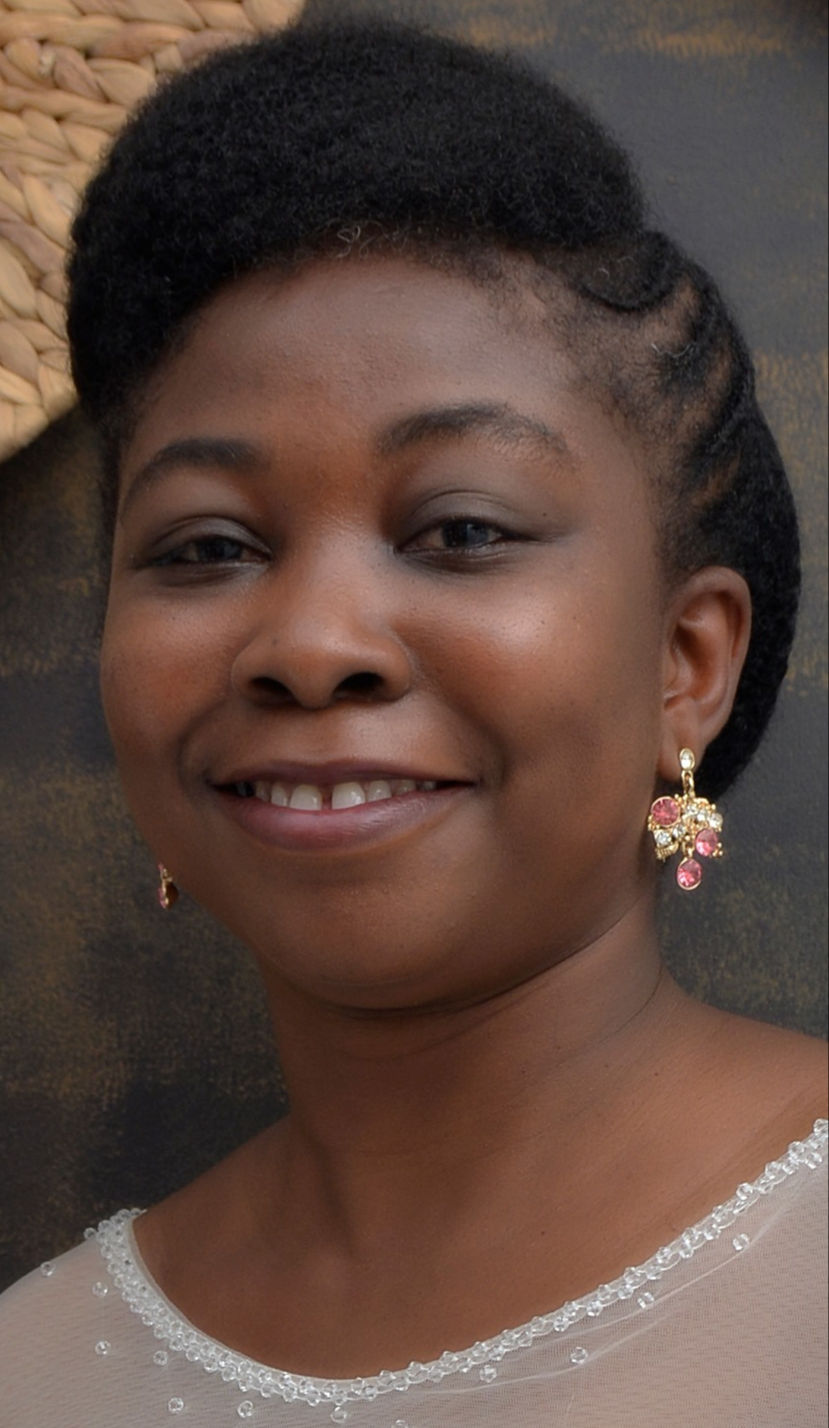
- Born: Ghana
- Education: Kwame Nkrumah University of Science and Technology; University of Bergen
- Scientific career
- Fields: Chemistry
- Workplaces: Kwame Nkrumah University of Science and Technology

Marian Asantewah Nkansah FGA is a Ghanaian environmental chemist. Her research work identifying and characterizing toxic substances – heavy metals, Persistent organic pollutant (POPs), Polycyclic aromatic hydrocarbon (PAHs), and gaseous pollutants – in everyday matrices such as water, food, soil, air, spices, edible clay, lipstick, and even classroom dust. She also explores remediation strategies with local materials. She also researches on the interaction of these pollutants with each other in the environment. She is part of the Global think tank of experts championing heat health. In 2016, together with some scientists from the Kwame Nkrumah University of Science and Technology (KNUST), she led a research which led to the confirmation that edible white clay poses potential cancer risk.

== Early life and education ==
Nkansah was born in Ghana to Mary and Joseph Nkansah, both educationists. She had her primary and secondary school education at St. Anthony's Experimental School, Nkawkaw and the St. Roses Senior High School at Akwatia, respectively and all in the Eastern Region of Ghana. She then furthered at the Kwame Nkrumah University of Science and Technology where she acquired a bachelor's degree in chemistry and a master's degree in Environmental Chemistry in 2002 and 2005 respectively. She holds a PhD in Environmental Chemistry from the University of Bergen in Norway.

== Career ==
She is a professor at the chemistry department of the College of Science at Kwame Nkrumah University of Science and Technology where she teaches practical chemistry, nuclear/radiochemistry, chemistry and society, research methods and petroleum chemistry. She is the Director for Students Affairs (DoSA), KNUST which is a unit that handles housing and welfare.

In 2016, she became the first scientist to win the Fayzah M. Al-Kharafi Prize, an annual award that recognises exceptional women scientists from scientifically and technologically lagging countries. She and Collins Obuah, another scientist from the University of Ghana, were the two scientist selected to attend the Lindau Nobel Laureate meeting in 2017. In 2021, she was among five women recipients in developing countries of the OWSD-Elsevier Foundation Awards. She received the 2022 Africa Role Model Overall Female Personality Award, and was inducted as a Fellow of the Ghana Academy of Arts and Sciences the same year.

She is a past warden of Africa Hall of Residence and was deputy director of Student Affairs in Charge of Housing and Welfare until November 2024, when she became the first Female Director of Student Affairs at Kwame Nkrumah University of Science and Technology. She serves on the executive committee of the International Year of Basic Science for Sustainable Development. Nkansah is a former executive member and alumna of the Global Young Academy. She has also served as a board member of the Ghana Geological Survey Authority and Fellow of the Ghana Academy of Arts and Sciences.

She was selected a Fellow of the International Science Council (ISC) in 2023. She is founder of the Women Chemistry Network, a global platform for identifying, nurturing and sustaining talents in the chemical and allied sciences.

== Awards and recognition ==
Nkansah has been recognised and awarded for her work including:

- Fellow of the Ghana Academy of Arts and Sciences
- Affiliate of the African Academy of Sciences
- Featured in the first-ever book on African Women in Science
- Next Einstein Forum Fellow
- 2016 - Winner of the Fayzah M. Al-Kharafi Prize
- 2017 - Selected to attend Lindau Nobel Laureate meeting
- 2017 - Selection to the Global Young Academy
- Elected an Executive Committee Member of Global Young Academy (GYA): 2018
- First Female Associate Professor, Department of Chemistry-KNUST: 2019
- Selected to represent element 60 (Neodymium) on the special Periodic Table of Younger Chemists (PTYC), 2019
- Winner of OWSD-ELSEVIER Award for Women (Africa Region), 2021
- Selected a Fellow of the International Science Council (ISC): 2023
- Founder and Convener of the Women in Chemistry Network (WICN): 2024
- Co-founder of The Gaudete Institute
