= Eugenie Kayitesi =

Rwandan Associate Professor and Food Scientist

- Citizenship: Rwanda
- Education: University of Pretoria (BSc, Msc, PhD)
- Occupation: Food scientist
- Awards: Fellow of Africa Academy of science. OWSD-Elsevier foundation award.

Eugenie Kayitesi is a Rwandan food scientist and Associate Professor at the University of Pretoria, South Africa. Her work centers on improving the utilisation of indigenous African plant based foods to enhance nutrition and food security across Africa.

== Early life and education ==
Kayitesi earned a BSc in Food Science and Technology in 2005, followed by an MSc in Agriculture and a PhD in Food Science from the University of Pretoria.

== Career ==
She currently serves as an Associate Professor in the Department of Consumer and Food Sciences, Faculty of Natural and Agricultural Sciences, University of Pretoria. Her research expertise cuts across various research areas of Food Science and Technology with particular focus on food processing and food chemistry. As an educator, she actively seeks and encourages female post graduates to pursue research or academia oriented careers in the sciences.

== Awards and recognitions ==
In 2022, she was named one of the four "Outstanding Women in Science Awardees in Rwanda" by Rwanda's National Council for Science and Technology (NCST), receiving the award in the Research category.

In 2023, she was honoured with the OWSD-Elsevier Foundation Award for her research contributions to food security, recognizing her as one of the seven women scientists from the Global South.

She was elected as a Fellow of the African Academy of Sciences in 2025.

== Selected publications ==
- Odukoya, Johnson Oluwaseun; Kayitesi, Eugénie; Mphahlele, Mokgadi Precious; Mungho Tata, Charlotte; Gouado, Inocent; Ikhile, Monisola Itohan; Ndinteh, Derek Tantoh (2024). "Influence of Smoking on the Volatiles Profile of Arius parkii, Cyprinus carpio and Three Selected Sciaenidae Family Fish Species". Journal of Culinary Science & Technology. 22 (6): 1213–1234. doi:10.1080/15428052.2022.2119913. ISSN 1542-8052.
- Oyeyinka, Samson A.; Oyedeji, Ajibola B.; Ogundele, Opeolu M.; Adebo, Oluwafemi A.; Njobeh, Patrick B.; Kayitesi, Eugénie (2021). "Infrared heating under optimized conditions enhanced the pasting and swelling behaviour of cowpea starch" (PDF). International Journal of Biological Macromolecules. 184: 678–688. doi:10.1016/j.ijbiomac.2021.06.129. PMID 34174303.
- Oyeyinka, Samson A.; Akinware, Ruth O.; Bankole, Aishat T.; Njobeh, Patrick B.; Kayitesi, Eugénie (2021). "Influence of microwave heating and time on functional, pasting and thermal properties of cassava starch". International Journal of Food Science & Technology. 56 (1): 215–223. doi:10.1111/ijfs.14621. ISSN 0950-5423.
