= Global Young Academy =

International scientific academy

- Formation: 2010; 16 years ago
- Type: Academy of Sciences
- Region served: Worldwide
- Members: 200 (full capacity)
- Co-Chairs (2025): Yensi Flores Bueso, Sam Chan Siok Yee
- Managing Director: Beate Wagner
- Immediate Past Co-Chairs (2024): Chandra Shekhar Sharma, Yensi Flores Bueso
- Main organ: Executive Committee, elected by the General Assembly
- Affiliations: InterAcademy Partnership, International Science Council
- Website: globalyoungacademy.net

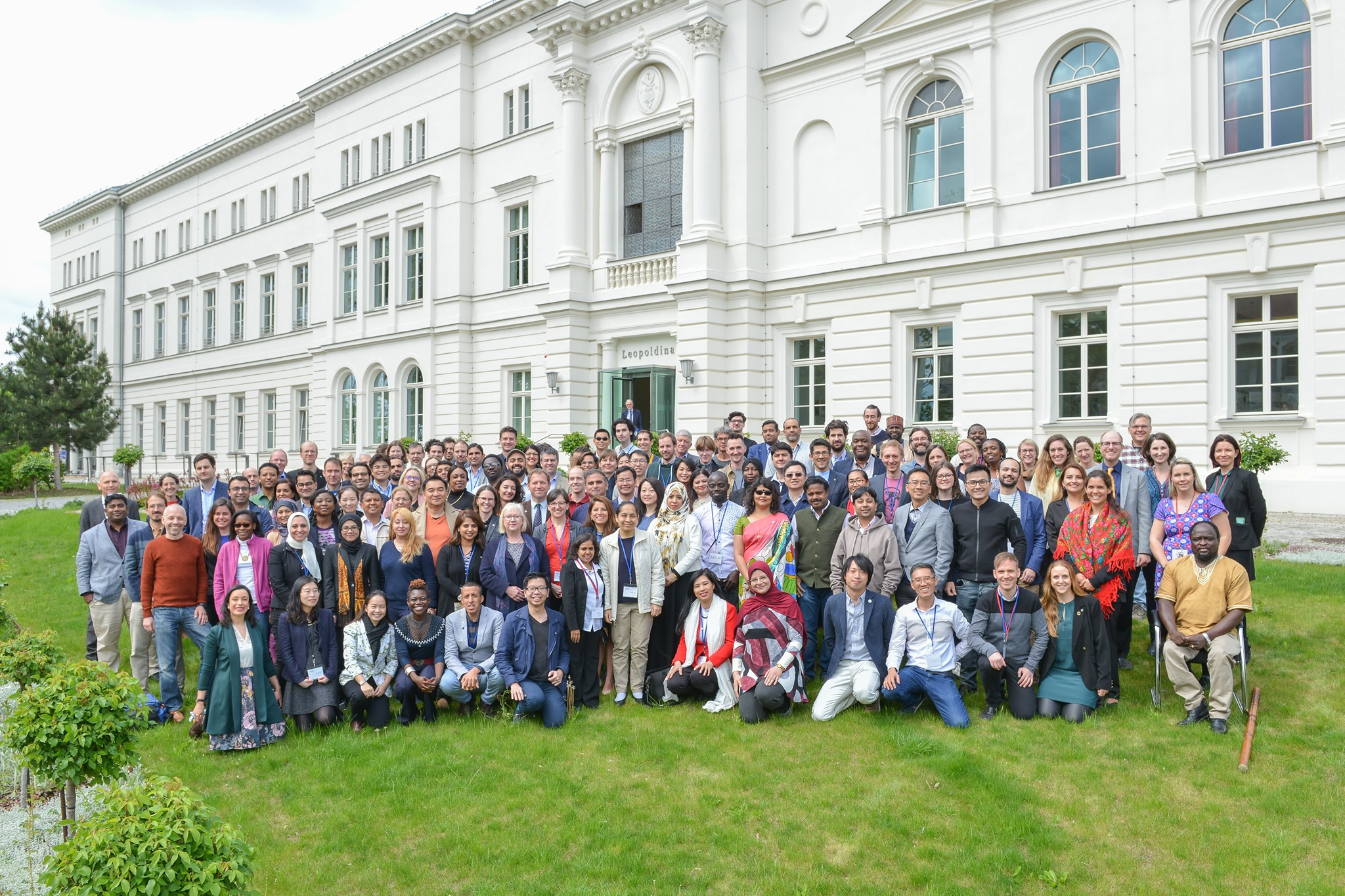
Members and alumni of the Global Young Academy at the 2019 anniversary Annual General Meeting at the Leopoldina in Halle, Germany

The Global Young Academy (GYA) is an international society of young scientists, aiming to give a voice to young scientists across the globe.

Membership strength is capped at 200, and the membership tenure is 5 years.

== Organization and membership ==
The Global Young Academy aims to be the "Voice for Young Scientists" and encourages international, intergenerational, and interdisciplinary collaboration and dialogue.

The GYA has working groups on science education, science and society, early career development, and interdisciplinary issues.

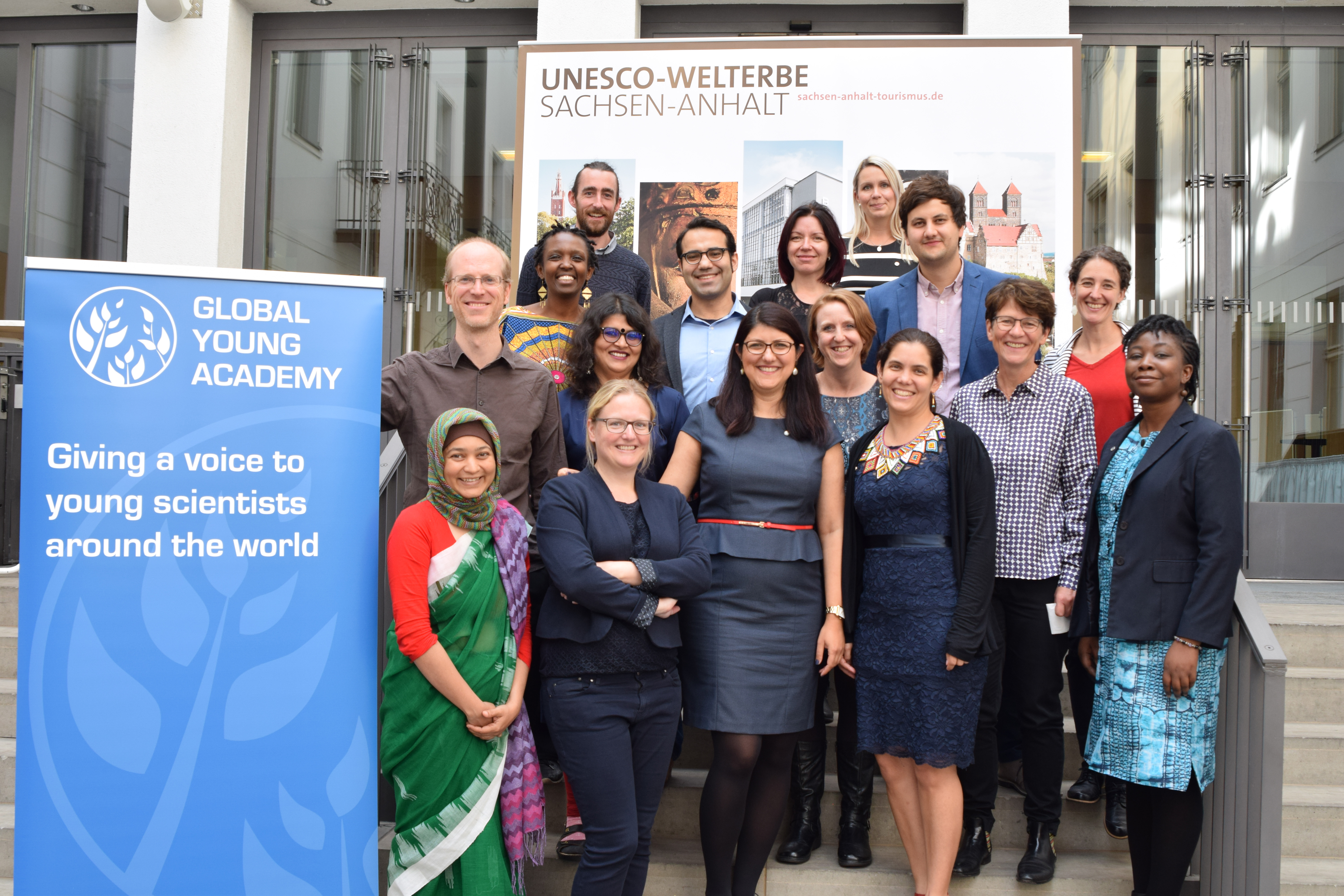
The 2019/2020 Executive Committee of the Global Young Academy, together with its Managing Director and office staff.

The typical age of members is approximately 35 years old; members are expected to be several years past their doctoral studies. The number of members is capped at 200, and each scientist is limited to a five-year term of membership. Memberships are offered based on scientific excellence, after a process of nominations from senior scientists, national societies, and self-nominations, together with peer review by members. The GYA reached its full capacity of 200 members in 2014. As of 2023, members and alumni of the GYA hail from 101 countries.

The office of the GYA is hosted at the German National Academy of Sciences Leopoldina in Halle (Saale), Germany.

== History ==
The Global Young Academy was founded in 2010 in Berlin, Germany, after a preliminary organizational meeting in 2008 sponsored by the InterAcademy Panel on International Issues and the World Economic Forum and a second organizational meeting in 2009 in Dalian, China. Its founding co-chairs are Gregory Weiss, a chemist from the University of California, Irvine, United States, and Nitsara Karoonuthaisiri from the National Center for Genetic Engineering and Biotechnology in Thailand. Previous co-chairs include (2018) Drs. Tolu Oni, University of Cape Town, South Africa, and Connie Nshemereirwe, Actualise Africa, Uganda and (2019) Drs. Connie Nshemereirwe and Koen Vermeir. The current (2023/24) co-chairs are Drs. Felix Moronta Barrios and Priscilla Kolibea Mante.

The GYA cooperates closely with most major scientific organizations around the world, such as UNESCO, the UN Secretary General's Scientific Advisory Board, ISC (formerly ICSU), IAP, the Global Research Council, the European Commission's Joint Research Centre and The World Academy of Sciences (TWAS). The GYA is active in helping establish national young academies around the world. In 2017, three national young academies were launched in Albania, Estonia, and Finland. The GYA also developed several international research projects and campaigns in recent years. Recently, the GYA was invited to join the advisory board of the UN Major Group for Children and Youth (UN MGCY). Since 2019, the GYA has been named a full member of the InterAcademy Partnership (IAP), the global network of 138 academies of science, engineering and medicine.

== Goals ==
The academy aims to bring together young scientists to solve global problems and policy issues that require interdisciplinary expertise, encourage young people to enter scientific careers, promote a scientific culture in which excellence in research is more highly valued than seniority, and improve the foundations of science worldwide by providing encouragement and recognition to researchers in countries with underdeveloped national scientific programs.

One particular focus of the GYA is facilitating the growth of the global network of (national) young academies around the world. The GYA has actively aided the establishment of national young academies around the world. For example, the Indian National Young Academy of Sciences, New Delhi, was established in 2015 in line with GYA. Since 2010, around 36 national young academies have been established. As of 2019, there are 41 national young academies, and more than 10 similar bodies around the world. More are close to launching in 2019.

== Notable members ==
- Olanike Adeyemo
- Noble Banadda
- Tilman Brück
- Sophie Carenco
- Eqbal Dauqan
- Bilge Demirköz
- Saeid Esmaeilzadeh
- Michal Feldman
- Rajesh Gopakumar
- Ingrid Johnsrude
- Nathalie Katsonis
- Yamuna Krishnan
- Xuelong Li
- Yueh-Lin Loo
- Ernesto Lupercio
- Salomé Martínez
- Sandra McLaren
- Hiba Mohamed
- Patience Mthunzi-Kufa
- Tolullah Oni
- Michael Saliba
- Noelle Selin
- Bettina Speckmann
- Raissa D’Souza
- Erick Tambo
- Dacheng Tao
- Nguyen TK Thanh
- Jenny Y. Yang
- Princess Sumaya bint Hassan (Advisory Board)
- Bruce Alberts (Advisory Board)
- Howard Alper (Advisory Board)
- Luiz Davidovich (Advisory Board)
- Helmut Schwarz (Advisory Board)
