= Taiwo Olayemi Elufioye =

Nigerian pharmacologist and researcher

- Citizenship: Nigerian
- Awards: Elsevier Foundation Awards for Early Career Women Scientists in the Developing World
- Scientific career
- Fields: pharmacognosy
- Workplaces: University of Ibadan

Taiwo Olayemi Elufioye is a Nigerian pharmacologist and researcher. Elufioye works as a professor at the University of Ibadan in the department of pharmacognosy. Elufioye is also a Fulbright Scholar at University of the Sciences in Philadelphia, Pennsylvania, where she is investigating drugs for neurodegenerative diseases.

== Career ==
Elufioye was awarded a research grant by the MacArthur Foundation in order to conduct research on several Nigerian medicinal plants in order to test for compounds that may be used to counteract neurodegenerative diseases.

In 2014, Elufioye was one of five women who won the Elsevier Foundation Awards for Early Career Women Scientists in the Developing World. Elufioye won the award for her work on the pharmacological properties of Nigerian plants. Her research is especially focused on compounds that could be used to treat malaria, wounds, memory loss, leprosy and cancer. The Elsevier Foundation Awards was presented at the American Association for the Advancement of Science (AAAS) Annual Meeting in Chicago and included a prize of $5000. When she won the award, the Vice Chancellor at the University of Ibadan, Isaac Adewole, said that Elufioye's accomplishments "would inspire other women in science" and that she is "a pride of Nigeria and the African continent as a whole."

Elufioye is published in the African Journal of Biomedical Research, Pharmacognosy Research, the International Journal of Pharmaceutics, and the African Journal of Traditional, Complementary and Alternative Medicines.

== Personal life ==
Elufioye was born into an educated family where her mother was a teacher and her father was an administrator at a university. Her entire family, including her siblings have attended college.
