= Eqbal Dauqan =

Yemeni-Malaysian biochemist

Eqbal Mohammed Abdu Dauqan (born 1980) is a Yemeni biochemist known for her studies of Biochemistry, nutrition, advocacy for refugees, and support of women scientists in her home country of Yemen and adopted country of Malaysia.

She earned her bachelor's degree in biological chemistry in 2002 and a master's degree in organic chemistry in 2008, both from Taiz University in Yemen. She earned her Ph.D. in biochemistry in 2012 at the National University of Malaysia under a scholarship from the Organization for Women in Science for the Developing World, and remained there as a postdoctoral researcher. In 2014, Dauqan received the Elsevier Foundation Award for Early Career Scientists in the Developing World for her work on antioxidants in vegetable oils.

She became a professor and Head of the Department of Medical Laboratories Sciences at Al Saeed University in Taiz, Yemen. She earned acclaim for her popular writing. In 2015, after her university was bombed and members of her family killed as part of the Yemeni Civil War, she returned to the National University of Malaysia as an assistant professor in chemical science and food technology, sponsored by the Institute of International Education's Scholar Rescue Fund. She is now activity mentoring junior scholars who work in critical environments.

Dauqan was appointed as an associate professor at University of Agder, Norway through the Scholar at Risk Network, In September 2018, she had been selected as TWAS Young Affiliate for 2018-2022. In May 2019 she was selected as a member of Global Young Academy (GYA) for 5 Years. In November 2019, she won the UiA bridge cultural builder award for 2019 as a great ambassador for UiA. Currently, she is working in University of Oslo (UiO), Norway through SAR as well.
