= Markus Granseth =

Swedish television presenter

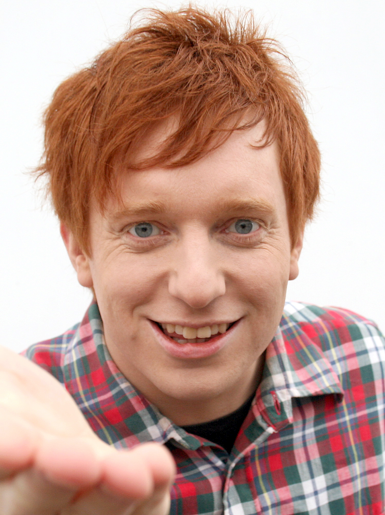
Markus Granseth

Lars Markus Granseth, nee Johansson (born 17 February 1983) is a Swedish television presenter. He has presented the SVT children's shows Bolibompa, Sagomattan, Morgonshowen and Random Mix. He presented Sommarlov at SVT. He worked with the production of Lilla sportspegeln. He worked for Radiohjälpen, a help organisation that sent him to Tanzania to broadcast about the help organisations work in the country for SVT.

He competed as a celebrity dancer at Let's Dance 2022, which is broadcast by TV4. Granseth works as a project manager, producer, and program manager at Idéstorm AB which he runs together with Stephan Wilson.

Since August 2008, he's been married to Elisabeth Granseth.
