= Sushila Maharjan =

Nepalese biotechnologist

Sushila Maharjan is a Nepalese biochemist and biotechnologist who is the research director at Nepal's Research Institute for Bioscience and Biotechnology which she co-founded in 2011.

== Background ==
Sushila Maharjan is a daughter of Mr Jit Govinda Maharjan and Mrs Radha Devi Maharjan, born in a village called Badegaun, from Lalitpur District of Nepal. She has 3 sisters and a brother. Her sisters, Hema Maharjan (founder of Namaste Kids Montessori), Rajani Maharjan (Business Development and Marketing manager, Software Engineer, System Analyst, Quality Auditor, 7+ year experience), and Ranjeeta Maharjan (an architect). Her brother is Dipendra Maharjan (An army orthopaedic surgeon). She completed her early studies from Arniko Secondary Boarding School. She did her I.Sc. from Tribhuvan University affiliated Amrit Science College. She did her master's degree in organic chemistry from Tribhuvan University. later, she did her PhD from Sun Moon University, South Korea.

== Career ==
She is the research director at Nepal's Research Institute for Bioscience and Biotechnology which she co-founded in 2011. She has conducted research into the use of soil microbes for use in medicine, including applications in the development of new antibiotics. In recognition for her work, she was one of five young scientists from the developing countries who received the Elsevier Foundation Award in 2016.

After receiving a bachelor's degree in chemistry and biological sciences, Maharjan went on to study organic chemistry at Nepal's Tribhuvan University, earning a master's degree in 2003. For her PhD from Sun Moon University, Korea, in 2011, she pursued her interest in metabolic and genetic engineering, focusing on streptomycetes.

Back in Nepal, she investigated the potential of natural resources for medical applications. A founding member of Nepal's Research Institute for Bioscience and Biotechnology, where she is now research director, she researched streptomyces in soil at high altitudes as a basis for developing new antibiotics for treating diseases which are resistant to existing drugs. She has also sought to improve the teaching of science in Nepal by encouraging her students to work in research laboratories where they can put theory into practice.

As of April 2018, Maharjan is applying an organ-on-a-chip approach to the establishment of differences between the sexes to diseases in her role as a post-doctoral research fellow at the Brigham and Women's Hospital in Boston.
