= Filip Dikmen =

Swedish comedian (born 1996)

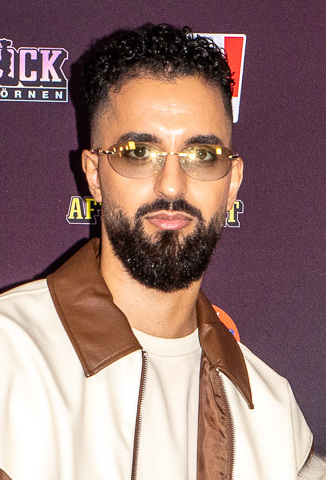
Filip Dikmen at Rockbjörnen in 2024.

Filip Dikmen (born 14 August 1996) is a Swedish comedian.

He was born in Landskrona. Dikmen placed second in Let's Dance 2022 which was broadcast on TV4. In 2018, he had his own show on SVT called Suleyman söker svar.

Dikmen did a distance at Vasaloppet on 2 March 2025 with Gunde Svan and was on a tv show called Mot alla odds on SVT.
