= Nilufar Mamadalieva =

Uzbekistani biochemist and researcher

Nilufar Mamadalieva is a biochemist from Uzbekistan.

== Biography ==
Mamadalieva completed a Master's in science at Fergana State University and a PhD at the Institute of the Chemistry of Plant Substances in Tashkent. She is a scientific researcher at the institute. Her work focuses on the phytochemical and biological investigation of active compounds in the local medicinal plants of Central Asia.

In 2011 Mamadalieva received the UNESCO-L’Oreal Award for Young Women in Life Sciences. In 2014 she received the Elsevier Foundation Award for Early Career Women Scientists in the Developing World.
