= Tolullah Oni =

Nigerian urban epidemiologist

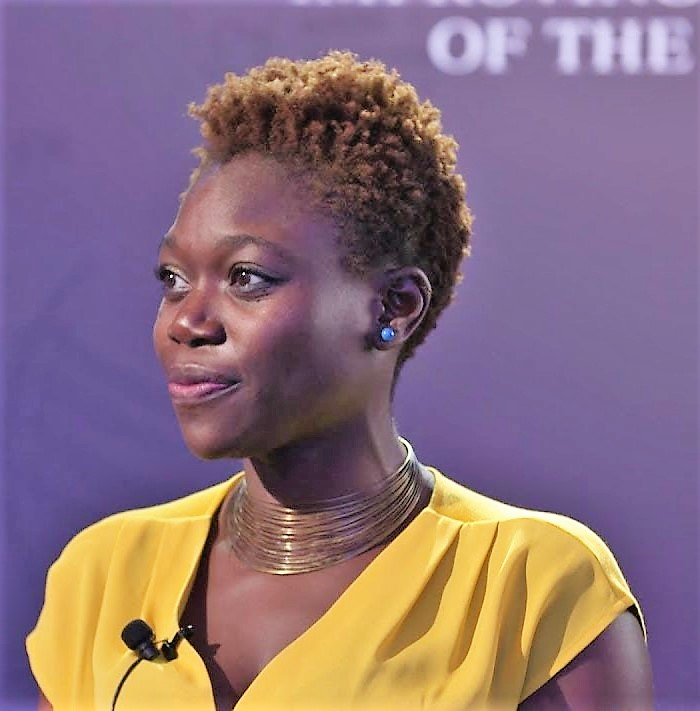
- Oni speaks at the World Economic Forum in 2018
- Born: Lagos, Nigeria
- Education: University College London; Imperial College London
- Known for: International health
- Scientific career
- Workplaces: University of Cape Town; University of Cambridge

Tolullah "Tolu" Oni (born 1980) is a Nigerian urban epidemiologist at the Medical Research Council Epidemiology Unit at the University of Cambridge. She is a NextEinstein Forum Fellow and World Economic Forum Young Global Leader.

== Early life and education ==
Oni was born in Lagos. At the age of seven Oni watched a documentary about cardiac surgery and wanted to become a pediatric cardiac surgeon. She attended boarding school. She trained in medicine with international health at University College London, where she earned a Bachelor's degree in 2001. She completed house jobs in the United Kingdom and Australia, and became interested in HIV. She was made president of the Medical Students' Union. Oni was a doctoral student at Imperial College London, where she started to study health outcomes. She explored how social determinants impacted health conditions, and finished her PhD in 2012. Oni was awarded the Royal Society of Tropical Medicine and Hygiene Medical Student Elective Prize, and moved to South Africa.

== Research and career ==
Oni worked in South Africa, where she established an interdisciplinary program Research Initiative for Cities Health and Equity (RICHE) at the University of Cape Town in 2007. RICHE works on urban health, identifying opportunities to implement public health policies in fast growing cities. She worked as a registrar in the Western Cape Department of Health. She became interested in interventions that can manage chronic infections and non-communicable diseases. Oni was made a senior lecturer at the University of Cape Town. Here, she developed the University of Cape Town's first undergraduate degree in global health, which launched in 2014. The course created by Oni is one of the first to teach global health from the perspective of the Global South.

She moved to the University of Cambridge, where she joined the Medical Research Council Epidemiology Unit as a senior research fellow. Here she is a member of the Global Diet and Activity Research Group and Network (GDAR) network, which works to prevent non-communicable diseases in low-income countries.

== Public engagement and policy ==
Oni has presented at the United Nations, the World Health Organization and World Economic Forum. Oni is a board of Future Earth and the African Academy of Sciences platform for open research. Oni is a Fellow of the African Academy of Sciences, and was elected a Fellow of NextEinstein in 2015 and the Stellenbosch University Institute for Advanced Study in 2017. She was elected one of the Co-Chairs of the Global Young Academy in 2018. Oni serves on the editorial boards of the Journal of Urban Health and The Lancet's Planetary Health. She has written for The Conversation. Oni serves as a judge for the Nature Inspiring Science Award.

== Awards and honours ==
- 2013 Elected to the South African Young Academy of Science
- 2014 Young Physicians Leadership Programme by the Inter-Academy Medical Panel
- 2019 World Economic Forum Young Global Leader
