= Nasima Akhter =

Bangladeshi nuclear medicine specialist

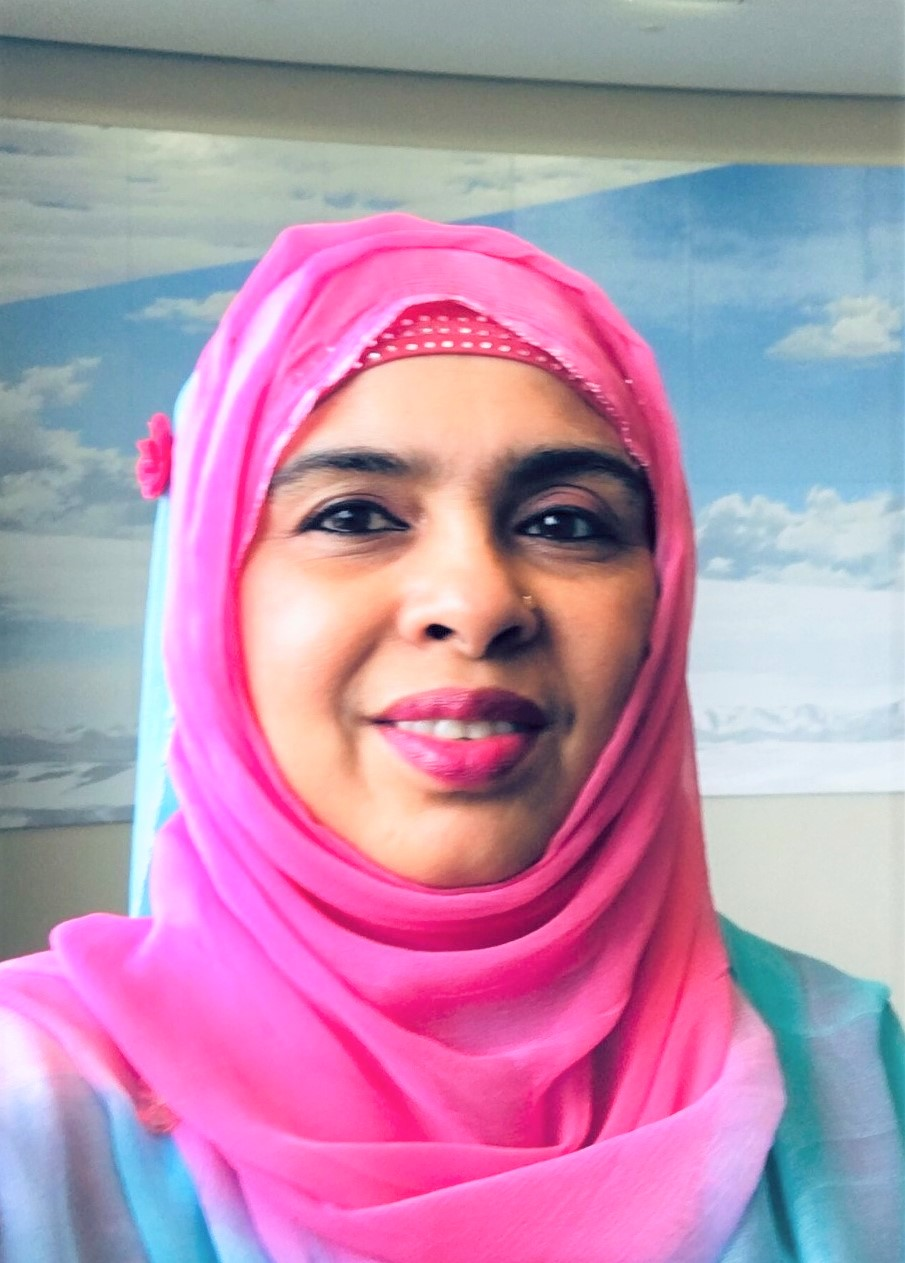
- Born: 1970 (age 55–56)
- Education: Sylhet MAG Osmani Medical College; Bangabandhu Sheikh Mujib Medical University; Kanazawa University; Kagawa University
- Occupation: nuclear medicine physician

Nasima Akhter (Bengali: নাসিমা আক্তার; born 1970) is a Bangladeshi scientist who specializes in nuclear medicine. In 2010, she won the BAS-TWAS Young Scientists Prize for her research involving nuchal translucency for fetal anomalies and research into nuclear cardiology. In 2013, she was honoured with the Elsevier Foundation Award for her work on nuclear medicine and ultrasonography.

== Biography ==
Born in 1970, Nasima Akhter attended Sylhet MAG Osmani Medical College, graduating in 1995. She went on to earn an M. Phil from Bangabandhu Sheikh Mujib Medical University (2001) and a Ph.D. from Kanazawa University, Japan, (2008) followed by training in obstetric ultrasonography at Japan's Kagawa University.

In 1998, Akhter began working as a nuclear medicine physician at the Bangladesh Atomic Energy Commission in Dhaka. She has researched anomalies during the first three months of pregnancy using nuchal translucency. She has also used adjunct medication with radioiodine therapy to research Graves' disease treatment. Her work has also focused on experiments with rats and mice to develop radiotracers for investigating dementia, schizophrenia and tumor growth by means of sigma receptor imaging.

== Awards ==
As a young scientist, Nasima received a number of awards, including the Young Scientist Award and the Gold Medal from the Bangladesh Society of Nuclear Medicine. In 2010, she won the BAS-TWAS Young Scientist Prize and in 2013, she was honoured with the OWSD-Elsevier Foundation Award for her pioneering work in medicine and life sciences. In addition to a monetary prize, The Elsevier award included attendance at the American Association for the Advancement of Science meeting in Boston.
