= Ashkan Pouya =

Swedish businessman (born 1976)

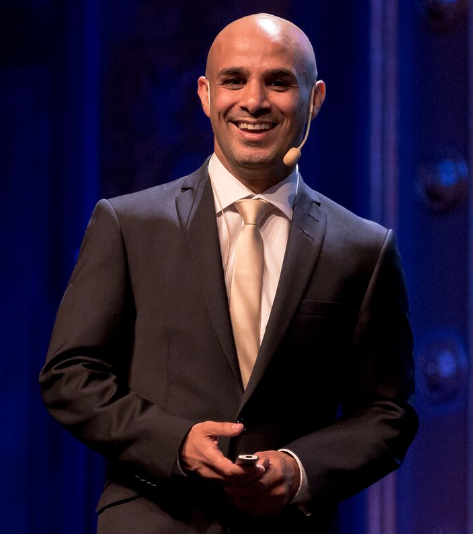
- Born: 2 June 1976 (age 49)
- Occupation: Serial Entrepreneur
- Known for: Co-founder of Serendipity Group, Diamorph, Episurf Medical, OrganoClick, Premune, Xbrane Bioscience, IRRAS

Ashkan Pouya , B.Sc., born 1976, is a Swedish serial entrepreneur and the co-founder of the business group, Serendipity Group. During 2010 to 2011 he was the director of innovation at Lund University. In 2008 Ashkan Pouya was recognized for his publication of “Phantom innovation- a launching pad for innovation processes” within the field of innovation management. During his active years in sports Ashkan Pouya was a successful martial artist. In 2000 he became the world champion in Combat Jujitsu.

== Biography ==
Ashkan Pouya was ten years old when he left Iran and moved to Hallstahammar in Sweden. Ashkan Pouya has a degree in economics from Uppsala University. He has been doing further studies in innovation and management at Queens University in Canada, and also at WHU-Otto Besheim School of Management in Germany.

== "Phantom Innovation" and the "Creative Dance" ==
In 2008, Ashkan Pouya published together with his colleague Saeid Esmaeilzadeh the paper “Phantom innovation- a launching pad for innovation processes” that explores the non-linearity of innovation processes. In the context of the publication they coined the term "Phantom Innovation" suggesting that an initial idea or a technical solution in their native form often differ from what eventually will be the innovation that provides real economic value to the community and the company. Their conclusion suggests that the initial innovation often changes during the path of commercialization ("the creative dance") and is introduced to a different market or fulfilling a different need than initially intended. Therefore, Ashkan chose to name the initial idea or solution for “Phantom Innovations” since they were thought of as innovations but did in retrospect contribute other values to the process.

In 2008 the duo received first prize "Best Student Paper" for their publication "Phantom Innovations-a launching pad for innovation processes" at the ISPIM Conference (The International Society for Professional Innovation Management) Innovations symposium in Singapore.

== Serendipity Group ==
Together with his childhood friend, the entrepreneur and professor Saeid Esmaeilzadeh, Ashkan Pouya founded Serendipity innovations (today a part of the Serendipity Group) in 2004. Within Serendipity Group Ashkan Pouya has created several new innovative companies based on leading academic research and knowledge-intensive environments. Since the start in 2004, Serendipity has founded more than 15 technology companies in clean-tech, life science, materials engineering, IT and medical technology.

The companies operate within a wide range of fields. The Nasdaq OMX listed Episurf Medical is a medical technology-company which designs and manufactures individually customized implants for cartilage damage. Diamorph AB operates in the area of advanced materials with factories in the Czech Republic and England, and OrganoClick a clean technology-company which develops environmentally friendly chemicals for treatment of wood and textiles. OrganoClick has among other awards, received the "Environmental Innovation of the year" in 2008 and was in 2010 admitted to "WWF Climate Solver Programme ". Xbrane Biopharma AB is a biopharmaceutical company specialized in high demand complex generics. The company develops biogenerics for injectable controlled release drugs and proprietary high-yield protein expression technology for the development of biosimilars.

== Awards and honors ==
In 2010 Ashkan Pouya and Saeid Esmaeilzadeh were awarded His Majesty King Carl XVI price “Årets Nybyggare” (Pioneers of the Year) 2010. They were awarded with the justification: Ashkan Pouya and Saeid Esmaeilzadeh have started with two empty hands and built a group consisting of 8 companies all of which have products and services based on world-leading technology. They have developed a business model that in recent years has generated a much higher return on investment than the industry average, and this during a period characterized by one of the largest economic and stock market declines in 50 years. With great commitment and dedication the two young entrepreneurs managed to win acceptance for their business model among the world's leading scientists. Their vision is grand, to within 10 years place themselves amongst the largest listed Swedish companies.

== Sports career ==
Ashkan Pouya started his martial arts career with judo at Gävle Judo Club which during his active sports career became his second home. At the end of the 90s he changed sports from judo to jujitsu where he had a bright career, resulting in several Swedish gold medals in both judo and jujitsu and world championship medals in combat jujitsu.
