= Let's Dance 2022 =

- Season 2022
- Celebrity winner: Eric Saade
- Professional winner: Katja Lujan Engelholm
- No. of episodes: 10

Release
- Original network: TV4
- Original release: 19 March – 21 May 2022

Season chronology
- ← Previous; Let's Dance 2021 Next → Let's Dance 2023

Let's Dance 2022 was the seventeenth season of celebrity dancing show Let's Dance. It premiered on 19 March 2022 on TV4. Petra Mede and David Lindgren returned as presenters.

== Contestants ==
Marie Mandelmann became the first confirmed celebrity dancer on 19 February.

Celebrity	Occupation	Professional partner	Status
Mia Parnevik	TV personality & wife of Jesper Parnevik	Tobias Karlsson	Eliminated 1st on 26 March 2022
Henrik Fexeus	Author & TV presenter	Malin Watson	Eliminated 2nd on 2 April 2022
Cecilia von der Esch	Actress & Comedienne	Hugo Gustafsson	Eliminated 3rd on 9 April 2022
Lisa Ajax	Singer	Tobias Bader	Eliminated 4th on 16 April 2022
Mouna Esmaeilzadeh	Doctor & TV personality	Tobias Wallin	Eliminated 5th on 23 April 2022
Markus Granseth	TV presenter & producer	Cecilia Ehrling Danermark	Eliminated 6th on 30 April 2022
Aron Anderson	Paralympian	Jasmine Takács	Eliminated 7th on 7 May 2022
Marie Mandelmann	TV personality	Jonathan Näslund	Third place on 14 May 2022
Filip Dikmen	Comedian & Social media personality	Linn Hegdal	Runner-up on 21 May 2022
Eric Saade	Singer	Katja Lujan Engelholm	Winner on 21 May 2022

== Scoring chart ==
Couple	Place	1	2	1+2	3	4	5	6	7	8	9	10
Eric & Katja	1	15	11	26	19	25	28	21+4=25	29+12=41	30+27=57	30+28=58	30+29+30=89
Filip & Linn	2	10	18	28	20	22	25	30+4=34	30+10=40	28+27=55	30+30=60	30+29+30=89
Marie & Jonathan	3	11	16	27	12	24	22	23+0=23	28+8=36	27+20=47	28+27=55	
Aron & Jasmine	4	14	18	32	18	19	29	24+0=24	27+6=33	30+26=56		
Markus & Cecilia	5	12	11	23	13	19	29	20+0=20	23+4=27			
Mouna & Tobias W.	6	8	9	17	15	17	25	23+4=27				
Lisa & Tobias B.	7	9	13	22	14	21	26					
Cecilia & Hugo	8	14	8	22	18	17						
Henrik & Malin	9	10	13	23	15							
Mia & Tobias K.	10	5	8	13								

Red numbers indicate the lowest score of each week.
Green numbers indicate the highest score of each week.
indicates the couple that was eliminated that week.
indicates the couple received the lowest score of the week and was eliminated.
indicates the couple withdrew from the competition.
indicates the couple returned to the competition after previously being eliminated.
indicates the couple finished in the bottom two.
indicates the couple earned immunity from elimination.
indicates the winning couple.
indicates the runner-up couple.
indicates the third place couple.

=== Average chart ===
Rank by average	Place	Couple	Total points	Number of dances	Total average
1	2	Filip & Linn	359	14	25.6
2	1	Eric & Katja	352	14	25.1
3	4	Aron & Jasmine	205	9	22.8
4	3	Marie & Jonathan	238	11	21.6
5	5	Markus & Cecilia	127	7	18.1
6	7	Lisa & Tobias B.	83	5	16.6
7	6	Mouna & Tobias W.	97	6	16.2
8	8	Cecilia & Hugo	57	4	14.3
9	9	Henrik & Malin	38	3	12.7
10	10	Mia & Tobias K.	13	2	6.5
