= Bilge Demirköz =

Turkish physicist (born 1980)

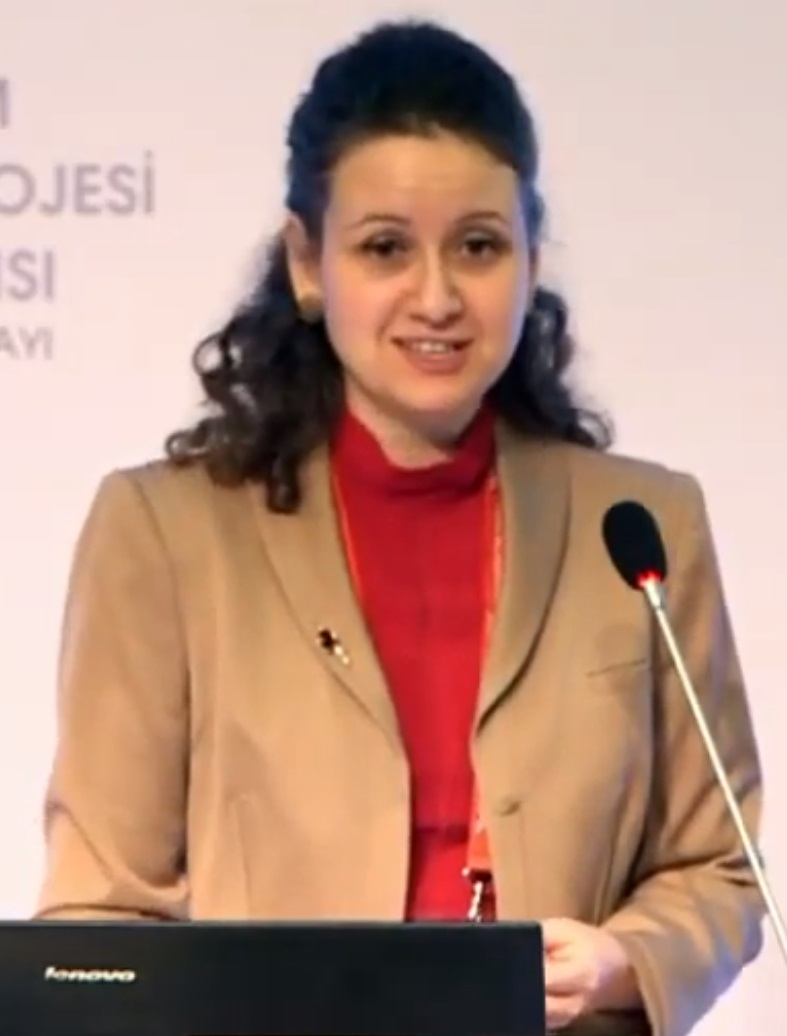
- Demirköz speaks at the 3rd National Open Access Workshop in Ankara in 2014
- Education: Massachusetts Institute of Technology (BS); University of Oxford (PhD)
- Scientific career
- Workplaces: CERN; University of Cambridge; IFAE; Middle East Technical University
- Thesis: Construction and Performance of the ATLAS SCT Barrels and Cosmic Tests (2007)

Bilge Demirköz (born 1980) is a Turkish professor of high energy physics at Middle East Technical University. She coordinates the Particle Radiation Tests Creation Laboratory, the first collaboration between Turkey and CERN, the European Organization for Nuclear Research.

== Education and career ==
Demirköz is from Istanbul. She attended Robert College for her high school studies. She wanted to take part in research during her undergraduate degree, so moved to Massachusetts Institute of Technology. She won Joel Matthew Orloff Award in 2001. She earned a Bachelor of Science in Physics and Music from Massachusetts Institute of Technology in 2001. She started working on the Alpha Magnetic Spectrometer. She was offered PhD positions in California Institute of Technology, MIT, Stanford University and Harvard University. Despite originally starting her PhD at MIT, the Space Shuttle Columbia disaster resulted in her moving to the University of Oxford. She was a Science and Technology Facilities Council Dorothy Hodgkin Scholar under the supervision of Antony Weidberg. She completed her postgraduate studies at the University of Oxford in 2007, and was a member of Balliol College. Her thesis was titled Construction and Performance of the ATLAS SCT Barrels and Cosmic Tests.

From 2007 to 2009 Demirköz was a postdoctoral fellow at CERN where she worked for the ATLAS experiment. In 2009, she was a postdoctoral scholar at the University of Cambridge. from 2009 until 2011, she was a postdoctoral fellow at CERN and the Institute for High Energy Physics (Institut de Fisica d'Altes Energies (IFAE).

She was promoted to Professor at Middle East Technical University in 2017. She serves as the Principal Investigator of the astroparticle physics group.

== Research ==
Demirköz is an astro-particle physicist who is known for her research on space radiation and particles that travel close to the speed of light. Her research includes work on the jet shapes of 900 GeV and 7 TeV data from the ATLAS experiment, testing detectors using cosmic rays, and participating in the Alpha Magnetic Spectrometer experiment on the International Space Station. She founded the Engin Arik Fellowship in 2008, a fund which supports Turkish students at CERN. She leads the Particle Radiation Tests Creation Laboratory, the first collaboration between Turkey and CERN. This allows her to study the radiation environment of the earth as well as monitoring the impact of radiation on electronic devices. In 2021, Demirköz led the team that developed a radiation meter that is the first scientific payload to go to from Turkey to space.

== Selected publications ==
- Aad, G.; Abajyan, T.; Abbott, B.; Abdallah, J.; Abdel Khalek, S.; Abdelalim, A. A.; Abdinov, O.; Aben, R.; Abi, B.; Abolins, M.; AbouZeid, O. S. (2012-09-17). "Observation of a new particle in the search for the Standard Model Higgs boson with the ATLAS detector at the LHC". Physics Letters B. 716 (1): 1–29. arXiv:1207.7214. Bibcode:2012PhLB..716....1A. doi:10.1016/j.physletb.2012.08.020. ISSN 0370-2693. S2CID 119169617.
- Demirköz, Bilge M. (2007). "Cosmic tests and performance of the ATLAS SemiConductor Tracker Barrels". Nuclear Instruments and Methods in Physics Research Section A: Accelerators, Spectrometers, Detectors and Associated Equipment. 572 (1): 43–47. Bibcode:2007NIMPA.572...43D. doi:10.1016/j.nima.2006.10.285. hdl:11511/47986.

== Awards and honors ==
She was selected as a TED fellow in 2011. She was appointed to the CERN User Advisory Committee in 2011. Demirköz has served on the Board of the Arts at CERN. Demirköz was elected to the Turkish Academy of Sciences in 2012. In 2015 she spoke at the Turkish Women's Network. She was named a L'Oréal-UNESCO International Rising Talent in 2017. In 2017, she received a British Council professional achievement alumni award, and was nominated to the Global Young Academy. She was featured in the 2018 Science Magazine celebration of women in science, and was elected to the Young Global Leaders forum in 2019.
