= Salomé Martínez =

Chilean mathematician

Salomé Minerva Angélica Martínez Salazar is a Chilean mathematician and a full professor in the Department of Mathematical Engineering at the University of Chile, where she directs the Mathematics Education Laboratory in the Center for Mathematical Modeling. Her doctoral research was in mathematical biology; more recently she has focused on mathematics education.

== Education and career ==
Martínez is the daughter of Chilean mathematician Servet Martínez. She earned a degree in mathematical engineering from the University of Chile in 1995, and completed her Ph.D. in the United States at the University of Minnesota in 2000. Her doctoral dissertation, The Effects of Diffusion and Cross-Diffusion for the 3 × 3 Lotka-Volterra Competition System, was supervised by Wei-Ming Ni.

After postdoctoral research at Georgia Tech from 2000 to 2002, she returned to the University of Chile as an associate professor in 2002. She has been a full professor there since 2017, becoming the first female professor in the Department of Mathematical Engineering. She was the university's Director of Gender and Diversity from 2018 to 2019.

== Recognition ==
Martínez was a member of the Global Young Academy from 2010 to 2012. She became a corresponding member of the Chilean Academy of Sciences in 2018.

In 1996, the Institute of Engineers of Chile gave Martínez the Marcos Orrego Puelma Prize, naming her as the best engineering graduate of the year in Chile. The Chilean Academy of Sciences gave Martínez their inaugural Adelina Gutierrez Award for the Academic Excellence of Young Female Scientists in 2012. She was a 2018 recipient of the UNESCO–Hamdan Prize for Teacher Development of UNESCO and the Hamdan Bin Rashid Al Maktoum foundation. Andrés Bello National University gave her its Prize for Merit in Education in 2021.
