= Hasibun Naher =

Bangladeshi mathematics researcher

- হাসিবুন নাহের
- Citizenship: Bangladesh
- Occupations: Researcher, educator
- Known for: Research on the mathematical modelling of tsunamis
- Title: Associate Professor
- Awards: OWSD-Elsevier Foundation Award (2018)
- Scientific career
- Fields: Applied mathematics
- Workplaces: BRAC University

Hasibun Naher is a Bangladeshi applied mathematics researcher and educator. In February 2018, she was one of five young women from developing countries to receive the OWSD-Elsevier Foundation Award. Her research has included the application of mathematics to tsunamis in order to improve predictions of how they develop. She is currently associate professor of mathematics at BRAC University, Dhaka. In 2019, she became a laureate of the Asian Scientist 100 by the Asian Scientist.

== Career ==
Dr. Hasibun Naher completed her Bachelor's of Science as well as her Master of Sciences in Mathematics from Jahangirnagar University, Savar, Bangladesh and secured first class in both. She went on to receive her PhD from the school of Mathematical Sciences, at the Universiti Sains Malaysia (USM), Penang, Malaysia. She taught undergraduate courses at the School of Mathematical Sciences, USM from 2011 to 2013.

Naher joined BRAC University in 2007 and is an associate professor in mathematics at their Department of Mathematics and Natural Sciences.

Naher's research is on non-linear partial differential equations includes developing computer simulations of tsunamis. She has also applied her mathematical models to earthquakes and storm surges with a focus on developing early warning signals.

Naher was interviewed on the United Nations Women and Girls in Science podcast series.

== Awards ==
Naher received the Best Researcher award in 2016 from BRAC University. Naher was awarded the OWSD-Elsevier Foundation Award for Early Career Women Scientists in the Developing world for her applied mathematics work in 2018. Researchers in developing countries are impacted by factors such as low funding, office facilities, and research support. In recognition of this award and her work, Naher was named as one of the Asian Scientist's 100 in 2019.

== Publications ==
=== Books ===
- Naher, H. (2005). Secondary algebra (1st ed.). Dhaka: Mullick, A. A. Uraka Book House.
- Naher, H. (2014). New travelling wave solutions of some nonlinear partial differential equations via extension of (G’/G) - expansion method (1st ed.). Penang: Universiti Sains Malaysia.
- Naher, H. (2006). Juniour algebra (1st ed.). Dhaka: Mullick, A. A. Uraka Book House.

=== Journal articles ===
- Naher, H., & Tanim, T. (2018). Active learning strategies in mathematics and science. 21st Century Education Forum @ Harvard 2018, 16(1), 18–31. Retrieved from https://www.21caf.org/21cefharvard-cp.html
- Naher, H., & Abdullah, F. A. (2017). New Generalized (G’/G)-expansion Method to the Zhiber-Shabat Equation and Liouville Equations. In M. N. (Ed.), 1st International Conference on Applied and Industrial Mathematics and Statistics 2017, ICoAIMS 2017 (Vol. 890). https://doi.org/10.1088/1742-6596/890/1/012018
- Hassan, Q. M. U., Naher, H., Abdullah, F., & Mohyud-Din, S. T. (2016). Solutions of the nonlinear evolution equation via the generalized riccati equation mapping together with the (Gʹ=g)-expansion method. Journal of Computational Analysis and Applications, 21(1), 62–82.
- Naher, H., & Abdullah, F. A. (2016). Further extension of the generalized and improved (G’/G)-expansion method for nonlinear evolution equation. Journal of the Association of Arab Universities for Basic and Applied Sciences, 19, 52–58. https://doi.org/10.1016/j.jaubas.2014.05.005
- Naher, H. (2015). New approach of (G′/G)-expansion method and new approach of generalized (G′/G)-expansion method for ZKBBM equation. Journal of the Egyptian Mathematical Society, 23(1), 42–48. https://doi.org/10.1016/j.joems.2014.03.005
