= Noelle Selin =

Chemist

Noelle E. Selin
- Born: Noelle Eckley
- Education: Harvard University
- Awards: National Science Foundation CAREER Award
- Scientific career
- Fields: Atmospheric chemistry
- Workplaces: Massachusetts Institute of Technology
- Thesis: Mercury in the Global Atmosphere: Chemistry, Deposition, and Land-Atmosphere Interactions (2007)
- Website: www.selingroup.org/noelle-eckley-selin/

Noelle Eckley Selin is an atmospheric chemist and Associate Professor at Massachusetts Institute of Technology in the Institute for Data, Systems and Society and the Department of Earth, Atmospheric and Planetary Sciences.

== Education and early career ==
Selin received her Bachelor of Arts in Environmental Science and Public Policy and her Master of Arts in Earth and Planetary Sciences at Harvard University in 2000. Following graduation, Selin became a Fulbright Fellow, working as a visiting researcher in Copenhagen at the European Environment Agency. There, she studied ways to improve scientific assessments of chemicals and their environmental impacts.

Following her Fulbright Fellowship, Selin returned to Harvard to receive her PhD in Earth and Planetary Sciences in 2007. There, she worked in the Atmospheric Chemistry Modeling Group with Daniel J. Jacob to understand how mercury cycles through the atmosphere, across land, and in water using a global 3-D chemical transport model. Her research extended to the politics and policy underlying mercury pollution, authoring articles in law and governance publications. Her graduate work was supported by a National Science Foundation Graduate Research Fellowship award, as well as a United States Environmental Protection Agency Science to Achieve Results Graduate Research Fellowship.

In 2007, Selin became a postdoctoral fellow at the Massachusetts Institute of Technology in the Center for Global Change Science and Joint Program on the Science and Policy of Global Change. Her research centered on atmospheric pollution and human health impacts, as well as continuing to focus on global efforts to regulate hazardous chemicals.

== Research ==
In 2010, Selin was appointed as an assistant professor at MIT in the Engineering Systems Division and Department of Earth, Atmospheric and Planetary Sciences, and was promoted to associate professor in 2015. She is also affiliated with the MIT Joint Program on the Science and Policy of Global Change and the MIT Center for Environmental Sciences. Her research centers on using atmospheric chemistry modeling to understand how atmospheric pollutants circulate and interact with the global environment. Her group has studied the financial and health benefits of reducing carbon emissions, finding that improving air quality led to reduced risk of health problems. The financial savings from avoiding health problems — and in turn avoiding the cost of medical care and reducing sick days — could recoup up to 10.5 times the cost of implementing a cap-and-trade program. The study, published in 2014, was the most detailed assessment of the effects of climate policy on the economy, air pollution, and human health. Her group has also found that global regulations on mercury pollution have a major economic benefit to the United States. Mercury is a major contaminant in the seafood market, and consumption leads to increased risk of cardiovascular disease and cognitive impairments. Decreasing the risk of mercury consumption through global policies to regulate mercury pollution can therefore have a large economic benefit by, for instance, saving individuals the cost of medical care over the course of their lifetime. Another study, also published in 2016, calculated the costs of IQ loss from lead emissions from aviation and won the award for Best Environmental Policy Paper from the journal Environmental Science & Technology.

Selin has also worked to ensure that her research findings — and those of the greater scientific community — are employed to better inform policy around air pollution, climate change, and hazardous substances like mercury. In 2016, she became a Leshner Leadership Institute Public Engagement Fellow through the AAAS and began working with the newly formed MIT International Policy Lab, which works to connect scientists with the societal impacts of their work. She has published on the need to build policy literacy for climate scientists to close the gap between science and society and implement policies that mitigate the effects of climate change.

== Awards and honors ==
- National Science Foundation CAREER Award, 2011-2017
- Leopold Leadership Fellow, Stanford Woods Institute for the Environment, 2013
- Global Young Academy Member, 2014-2019
- Kavli Fellow, National Academy of Sciences, 2015
- Leshner Leadership Institute Public Engagement Fellow, American Association for the Advancement of Science, 2016-2017
