= Jennifer Thomson =

South African microbiologist

Jennifer Ann Thomson
- Born: June 16, 1947 (age 79); Cape Town, South Africa
- Education: University of Cape Town, Cambridge University, Rhodes University
- Known for: Expertease in Genetically Modified Organisms used in South African Crops
- Awards: L'Oréal-UNESCO Award for Women in Science An honorary doctorate from the Sorbonne Four Outstanding SA Woman Achiever of the Year award Four Outstanding Young SA Woman Achiever of the Year award International Prize for the Protection of Human Rights
- Scientific career
- Fields: Microbiology
- Workplaces: University of Cape Town

Jennifer Ann Thomson (16 June, 1947) is a South African microbiologist, author and most notably an expert on and proponent of the agricultural benefit of Genetically modified organisms (GMO). Thomson was born in Cape Town, South Africa and she is currently a professor at her alma mater the University of Cape Town.

== Education and employment ==
Jennifer Ann Thomson received degrees and educational experience from across the globe, most notably South Africa. Thomson received a Bachelors of Science in Zoology from the University of Cape Town, a Masters of Arts in Genetics from Cambridge University and a PhD in Microbiology from Rhodes University. Thomson was a postdoctoral fellow at Harvard Medical School and also spent a year at Massachusetts Institute of Technology.

Thomson began her journey of professorship as a lecturer and associate professor in the genetics department of University of the Witwatersrand in South Africa before she established the Laboratory for Molecular and Cell Biology for the Council for Scientific and Industrial Research and served as its director.

After many roles and a department reconstruction, Thomson settled into her current role as a Emeritus Professor of Microbiology in the Molecular and Cell Biology department and Deputy Dean of Science at her alma mater the University of Cape Town, also in South America. As well as being an advisor, fellow, chair and member of many boards such as the Council for Biotechnology Information, African Agricultural Technology Foundation, the International Service for the Acquisition of Agri-biotech Applications, BIO-EARN, and the European Action Group on Life Sciences. Lastly, she is the President of the Organisation for Women in Science for the Developing World.

== Research ==
Thomson is leading a team in the development of a maize which is resistant to the African endemic maize streak virus (MSV) and to drought through the use of GMOs. Maize streak virus greatly stunts the growth of crops. This lack of growth in crops adds to the severe starvation and hardships faced by many in the area where Thomson conducts her research. Because of this possible benefit of the use of GMOs, Thomson flights diligently for GMOs use, seeing them as a tool rather than a potential harm. The work she has done on crops has, so far, shown excellent defence against MSV and drought and it was the first ever transgenic crop created in Africa, by Africans, to help elevate an African problem.

== Publications ==
Alongside numerous research publications, Thomson has also published 3 books: Genes for Africa, Seeds for the Future and Food for Africa. All have to do with the use of GMO in crops in South America.

== Awards ==
Thomson has received the L'Oréal-UNESCO Award for Women in Science and an honorary doctorate from the Sorbonne.

She received both the Four Outstanding SA Woman Achiever of the Year award and the Four Outstanding Young SA Woman Achiever of the Year award administered from the Women's Bureau from South Africa.

Thomson has also been named as a Fellow by the Royal Society of South Africa.

Most recently the Accademia dei Lincei of Italy awarded Thomson the International Prize for the Protection of Human Rights.
