= Tanzima Hashem =

Bangladeshi University Teacher

- তানজিমা হাশেম
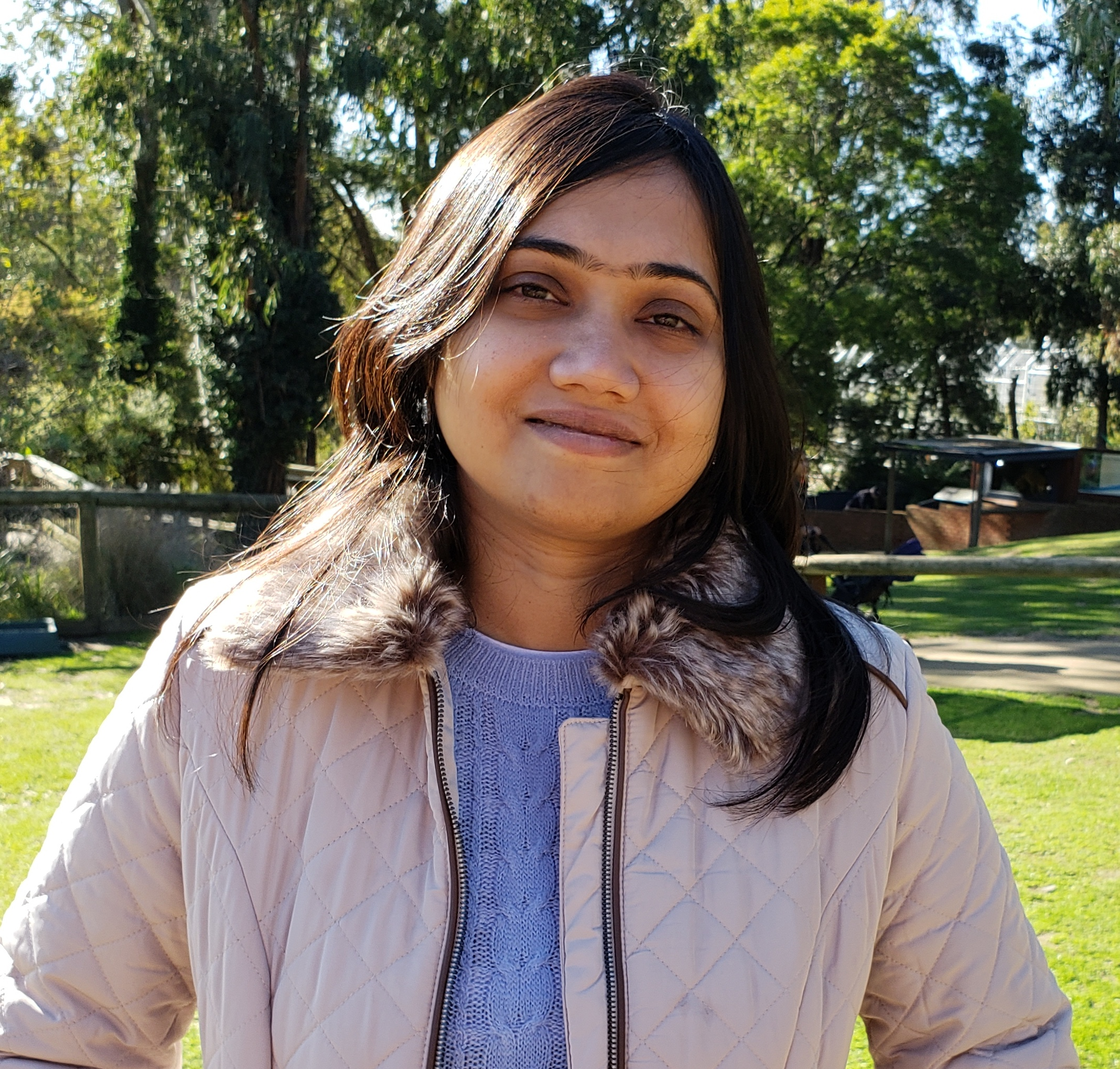
- Education: Bangladesh University of Engineering and Technology, University of Melbourne
- Awards: Elsevier Foundation Award (2017)
- Scientific career
- Fields: Internet privacy

Tanzima Hashem, a Bangladeshi professor at BUET, is one of the five women scientists from the developing world who won Elsevier Foundation Awards in 2017. Her research focuses on maintaining user privacy while location-based services are being accessed. She is also noted for organizing the first workshop in Bangladesh on women in computing in 2014.

Hashem graduated in computer science and engineering at BUET in 2004, earning a master's degree in 2006. She went on to obtain a doctorate from the University of Melbourne, Australia, in 2011. She has also spent short periods in Melbourne from 2012 to 2017, working as an academic research visitor. In 2018, she became a laureate of the Asian Scientist 100 by the Asian Scientist.
