= Lydia Makhubu =

Swazi chemist (1937–2021)

- Born: Lydia Phindile Makhubu; 1 July 1937; Swaziland
- Died: July 24, 2021 (aged 84); Swaziland
- Education: University of Toronto
- Occupation: Chemist

Lydia Phindile Makhubu (1 July 1937 - July 2021) was a Swazi chemist and former professor of chemistry, dean and vice-chancellor of the University of Swaziland (now the University of Eswatini).

== Life ==
She was born at the Usuthu Mission in Swaziland. Her parents were teachers, but her father also worked as an orderly in health clinics. Her early exposure to medicine had a great influence on her choice of career; she initially wanted to become a doctor, but then switched to chemistry.

Makhubu graduated from Pius XII College (now the National University of Lesotho) in Lesotho with a B.Sc. in 1963. With a Canadian Commonwealth scholarship, she obtained an M.Sc. in organic chemistry from the University of Alberta in 1967, followed by a Ph.D. in medicinal chemistry from the University of Toronto in 1973, becoming the first Swazi woman to earn a doctorate.

She returned to her homeland and joined the faculty of the University of Swaziland, becoming a lecturer in the chemistry department in 1973, the dean of science from 1976 to 1980, a senior lecturer in 1979, a full professor the following year, and vice-chancellor from 1988 to 2003. Her research focused on the medical effects of plants used by traditional Swazi healers.

From its inception in 1993 until 2005, Makhubu was the President of the Third World Organization for Women in Science, which provides fellowships for postgraduate study. She was the first woman chairperson of the executive committee of the Association of Commonwealth Universities. She also served in numerous other organizations, such as the United Nations Advisory Committee on Science and Technology for Development.

She received numerous grants and honours, including a MacArthur Foundation grant (1993–1995), and honorary doctorates from various universities, including a doctor of laws from Saint Mary's University in 1991.

She married the surgeon Daniel Mbatha; they have a son and a daughter.
