= Michal Feldman =

Israeli computer scientist (born 1976)

- מיכל פלדמן
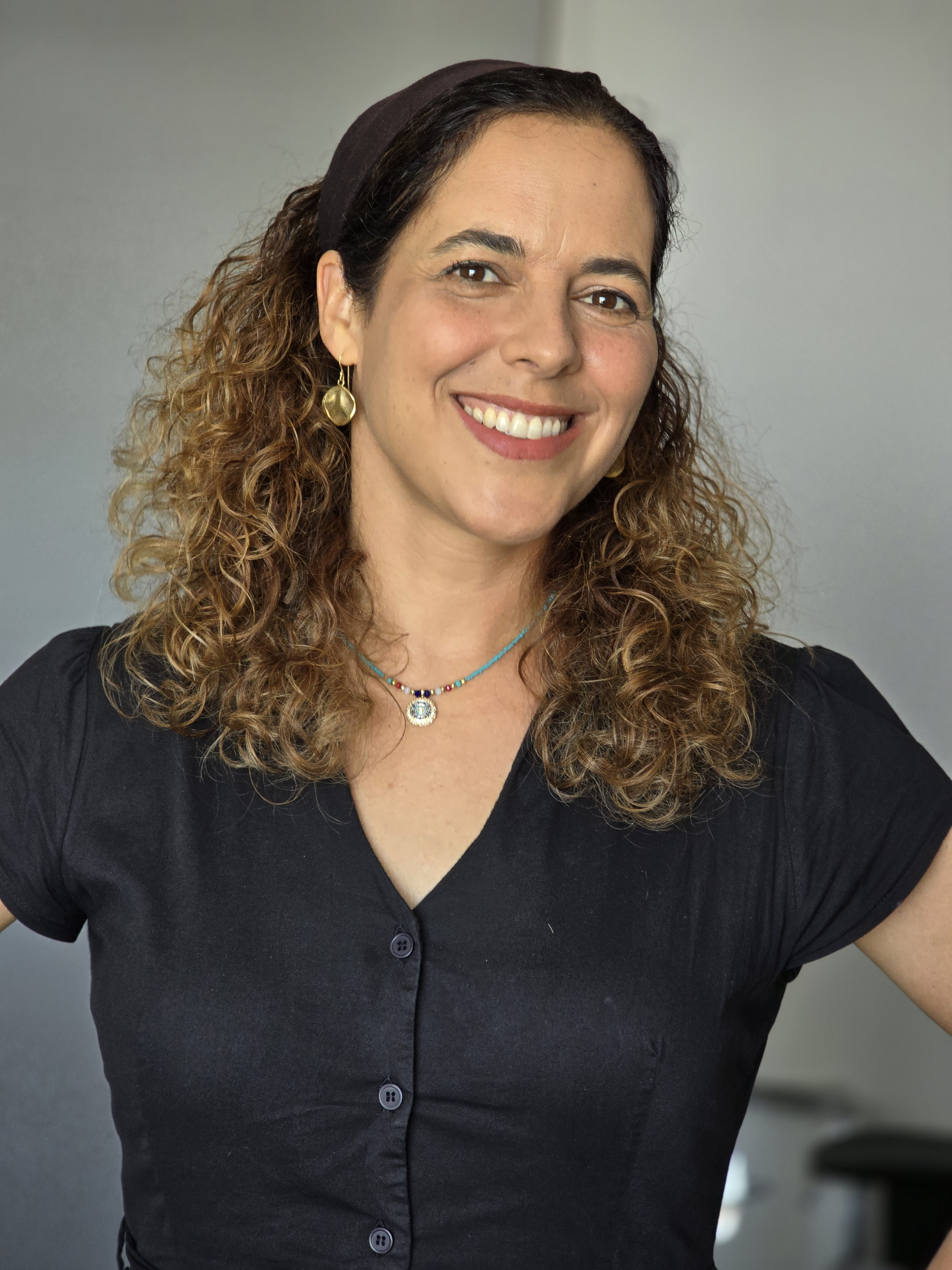
- Born: February 1, 1976 (age 50)
- Education: Bar-Ilan University, University of California, Berkeley
- Known for: Algorithmic game theory
- Awards: ACM SIGecom mid-career Award (2023), Bruno Award (2022), Kadar Award (2022), ERC grants (2013, 2019), Amazon Research Award (2018)
- Scientific career
- Fields: Computer Science
- Workplaces: Tel Aviv University, Microsoft Research Israel
- Thesis: (2005)

Michal Feldman (Hebrew: מיכל פלדמן; born 1 February 1976) is a full professor of Computer Science and the Chair of Computation and Economics at Tel Aviv University, the head of Economics and Computation (EC) lab, and a visiting researcher in Microsoft Research Israel. Her research focuses on algorithmic game theory, an area that lies in the intersection of computer science, microeconomics and game theory. Among other topics, she studies auction theory, mechanism design, algorithm design, the price of anarchy, and e-commerce.

Feldman is an alumna of the Israel Young Academy and of the Global Young Academy. Her research is funded by prestigious grants, including, among others, grants of the ERC (European Research Council) : ERC starters and ERC consolidator, ISF grants (Israel Science foundation), and an Amazon Research Award.

Feldman was selected by the Forbes magazine as one of the most influencing women in Israel in 2016, and is the recipient of the Kadar Award, Bruno Award, and ACM SIGecom mid-career Award.

== Biography ==
Feldman was born to Tzipi and Dr. Menachem Finkelstein. She is married to Yuval Feldman, a law professor at Bar-Ilan University, and they have five children.

Upon graduating high school, Feldman served in the intelligence unit. In 1999, she received her BSc in computer science from Bar Ilan University summa cum laude. In 2005, she completed her PhD studies in the University of California, Berkeley. In her PhD thesis, she studied incentives for collaboration in peer-to-peer systems. Her PhD dissertations included several advances in the area of cooperation in peer-to-peer systems. Upon graduation, Feldman returned to Israel and continued her postdoctoral studies at the Hebrew University of Jerusalemand Tel Aviv University, under the supervision of Prof. Noam Nisan and Yishay Mansour. In 2007, she joined as a faculty member to the Jerusalem School of Business Administration, and as a member of the Center for the Study of Rationality. From 2011 to 2013, Feldman was a visiting professor at Harvard University in Cambridge, Massachusetts, and a visiting researcher in Microsoft Research New England. In 2011, Feldman was elected to the Global Young Academy, and in 2012, she was elected to the Israel Young Academy, established by the National Academy of Sciences and Humanities. In 2013, upon her return to Israel, Feldman joined the School of Computer Science at Tel Aviv University.

== Honors and awards ==
- ICM Invited Speaker (International Congress of Mathematicians) (2026)
- Weizmann Prize for Exact Sciences (2025)
- Fellow of Asia-Pacific Artificial Intelligence Association (AAIA)- 2025
- 2024 ACM Fellow (2024)
- ISF MAPATZ Breakthrough Research Grant (2024)
- ACM SIGecom mid-career Award (2023)
- Bruno Award (2022).
- Kadar Award for Outstanding Research (2022)
- Three ERC grants, of the European Research Council (2013 - starter, 2019 – consolidator, 2025).
- Amazon Research Award (2018).
- Tel Aviv University Rector award for excellence in teaching (2016).*Forbes magazine list of 50 most influential women in Israel (2016).
- Member of the Israel Young Academy, and a member of its management committee (2012-2016).
- Member of the Global Young Academy (2011-2015).
- TheMarker Magazine's 40 under 40 (most promising young men and women under the age of 40) (2014).
- Marie Curie International Outgoing Fellowship, of the European Commission (2011)
- The Alon Scholarship for outstanding researchers, by the Israeli Council for Higher Education (2009).
