= Erick Tambo =

Cameroonian researcher

- Born: Erick Rostand Gankam Tambo; Cameroon
- Education: Technical University of Dortmund (graduate studies)
- Occupations: Researcher, academic, computer scientist
- Employer: United Nations University
- Known for: Information and Communication Technologies for Development (ICT4D), educational technologies, Pan-African higher education

Erick Tambo de Gankam is a Cameroonian researcher resp. "scientivist" (using science to raise awareness on development issues and improve quality of live with a focus on civil society) as he define himself. He is the research coordinator at the Pan African University Institute for Water and Energy Sciences (incl. Climate Change) of the African Union and an Associate Academic Officer of the United Nations University in Bonn, Germany leading the program on Pan African Cooperation and Educational Technologies (PACET) . He was named to the 2013 list of Most Influential Africans in Germany by African Heritage Magazine.

== Education ==
Tambo completed in 2006 his graduate studies in computer science at the Technical University of Dortmund, Germany. He also holds a PhD in computer science since 2010 from the FernUniversität in Hagen, Germany (Distance Learning Open University – Germany).

== Interests ==
Tambo's interests include Information Technologies for Development (ICT4D), E-learning, migration, development and the African Diaspora.

== Career and appointments ==
- 2016–Present : Fellow of the Global Young Academy
- 2014–present: Coordinator of the Union African DiasporaSixth Region (AUADS) program of the African Union in North Rhine Westphalia, Germany
- 2014–present: Co-founder and member of the Forum African Scientists for African Development Germany (FASFAD-G)
- 2013–present: Liaison Professor at Hans Böckler Foundation, Germany
- 2013–present: Member of the Joint Academic Board of the master on “Geography of Environmental Risks and Human Security” of the UNU-EHS and University Bonn, Germany
- 2013–present: Member of German Informatics Society (Gesellschaft für Informatik e. V.)
- 2010–2012: Member of the expert Team: Information and Communication Technologies (ICT4D) at the Federal Ministry for Economic Cooperation and Development – BMZ
- 2010–2011: Chairman of the African Good Governance Network (AGGN)
- 2010–present: Member of the scientific advisory council of the Cameroon Association of Engineer and Computer scientists in Germany (VKII e. V.) and head of the working group on Information and communication technology
- 2007–2009: Member of the board of trustees of the German Academic Exchange Service (DAAD), Germany
