= Germaine Djuidjé Kenmoé =

Cameroonian physicist (born 1973)

Germaine Djuidjé Kenmoé (born 1973) is a Cameroonian physicist.

== Early life and education ==
Djuidjé Kenmoé was one of 25 children, her mother being her father's sixth wife. At the age of seven she insisted on going to primary school, walking 6 kilometres (3.7 mi) each way daily. The nearest secondary school was further away so one of her brothers taught her until a brother-in-law, who believed in women's education, paid for her to go to university and study physics. She graduated from the University of Yaoundé I with a first degree and planned to do a masters and doctorate, but family financial changes meant that she changed to a teacher training course, intending to finance her PhD studies from her teaching job. She met and married Aloyem Kaze at teaching college, but continued to work and study for her PhD which she achieved after seven years.

== Career ==
Djuidjé Kenmoé's research concerns friction and wear of surfaces. She has also published on the design of domestic solar energy supplies. In 2016 she was appointed associate professor in the department of physics at the University of Yaoundé I, having previously been teaching assistant, assistant lecturer and senior lecturer.

== Awards ==
Djuidjé Kenmoé won a 2018 OWSD-Elsevier Foundation Award, and a Fulbright Scholarship in the same year.

== Selected publications ==
- Djuidjé Kenmoé, Germaine (2011). Frictional stick-slip phenomena: Models for the study of the nanotribology with rigid and deformable substrates. Lambert Academic Publishing. ISBN 978-3844309737.
- Djuidjé Kenmoé, Germaine; Crépin Kofané, Timoléon (2011). "Frictional Stick-Slip Dynamics in a Deformable Potential". In Bhushan, Bharat (ed.). Scanning Probe Microscopy in Nanoscience and Nanotechnology 2. NanoScience and Technology. Berlin Heidelberg: Springer. pp. 533–549. doi:10.1007/978-3-642-10497-8_18. ISBN 978-3-642-10496-1.
