= National Environmental Engineering Research Institute =

Indian government body

- Motto: Leadership in Environmental Science and Engineering for Sustainable Development
- Parent institution: Council of Scientific and Industrial Research
- Founders: Ministry of Science and Technology, Government of India
- Established: 8 April 1958
- President: Prime Minister of India
- Director: Dr. S. Venkata Mohan
- Formerly called: Central Public Health Engineering Research Institute
- Address: Nehru Marg, Nagpur, Maharashtra, India
- Location: Nagpur (Head Quarters), Delhi, Mumbai, Chennai, Kolkata, Hyderabad
- Coordinates: 21.122759291934603°N 79.07153873042535°E
- Interactive map of National Environmental Engineering Research Institute
- Website: www.neeri.res.in

The National Environmental Engineering Research Institute (NEERI) in Nagpur was originally established in 1958 as the Central Public Health Engineering Research Institute (CPHERI). It has been described as the "premier and oldest institute in India." It is an institution listed on the Integrated Government Online Directory. It operates under the aegis of the Council of Scientific and Industrial Research (CSIR), based in New Delhi. Indira Gandhi, the Prime Minister of India at the time, renamed the Institute NEERI in 1974.

The Institute primarily focused on human health issues related to water supply, sewage disposal, diseases, and industrial pollution.

NEERI operates as a laboratory in the field of environmental science and engineering and is one of the constituent laboratories of the Council of Scientific and Industrial Research (CSIR). The institute has six zonal laboratories located in Chennai, Delhi, Hyderabad, Kolkata, Nagpur, and Mumbai. NEERI operates under the Ministry of Science and Technology of the Indian government. NEERI is a partner organization of India's POP National Implementation Plan (NIP).

== History ==
In 1958, the Central Public Health Engineering Research Institute (CPHERI) was established. It was created by the Council of Scientific and Industrial Research (CSIR). In 1974, after participating in the "United Nations Inter-Governmental Conference on Human Environment" and with its renaming by Prime Minister Indira Gandhi, CPHERI became the National Environmental Engineering Research Institute (NEERI). NEERI has headquarters in Nagpur and five zonal laboratories in Mumbai, Kolkata, Delhi, Chennai, and Hyderabad.

The study for the location of a new municipal solid waste landfill site in Kolkata used the institute's 2005 guidelines.

During the COVID-19 crisis, the institute developed a saline gargling sample method to trace the disease.

== Fields ==
=== Environmental monitoring ===
Since 1978, the institute has operated a nationwide air quality monitoring network. Sponsored by the Central Pollution Control Board (CPCB) since 1990. Receptor modelling techniques are used. CSIR-NEERI is involved in the design and development of air pollution control systems.

The institute has also developed a water purification system called 'NEERI ZAR'. In the 1960s and 1970s, the institute developed guidelines for Defluorination techniques. They have sometimes formed a departure point for the development of other techniques. The Institute tests samples for research on Defluorination and the measurement of particulate matter in air.

The institute has been entrusted by the courts to provide an inspection of the current environmental and legal framework.

=== Skill development ===
The institute has set up a Centre for Skill Development, offering certificate courses in the areas of environmental impact and water quality assessment. Prof. V. Rajagopalan (1993 Vice President of the World Bank) had in his time (1955–65) with the Institute created a national program for water industry professionals. Graduate programmers were established in Public Health Engineering at the Guindy Engineering College, Madras, Roorkee Engineering University, and VJTI in Mumbai.

=== Assessment of research ===
In 1989–2013, 1,236 publications of the National Environmental Engineering Research Institute were assessed. The institute technique for enrichment of ilmenite with titanium dioxide has been evaluated externally.

== Patent development ==
The institute has national and international patents for a method to manufacture zeolite-A using flash instead of sodium silicate and aluminate.

== Selected publications ==
- Kumar, A., et al. "Sustainability in Environmental Engineering and Science." (2021): 253–262.
- Sharma, Abhinav. "Effect of ozone pretreatment on biodegradability enhancement and biogas production of biomethane distillery effluent."
- Sharma, Asheesh, et al. "NutriL-GIS: A Tool for Assessment of Agricultural Runoff and Nutrient Pollution in a Watershed." National Environmental Engineering Research Institute (NEERI). India (2010).
- Sinnarkar, S. N., and Rajesh Kumar Lohiya. "External user in an environmental research library." Annals of library and information studies 55.4 (2008): 275–280.
- Schools, Greywater Reuse In Rural. "Guidance Manual." National Environmental Engineering Research Institute (2007).
- Thawale, P. R., Asha A. Juwarkar, and S. K. Singh. "Resource conservation through land treatment of municipal wastewater." Current Science (2006): 704–711.
- Rao, Padma S., et al. "Performance evaluation of a green belt in a petroleum refinery: a case study". Ecological engineering 23.2 (2004): 77–84.
- Murty, K. S. "Groundwater in India." Studies in Environmental Science. Vol. 17. Elsevier, 1981. 733–736.
