= Mouna Esmaeilzadeh =

Swedish neuroscientist (born 1980)

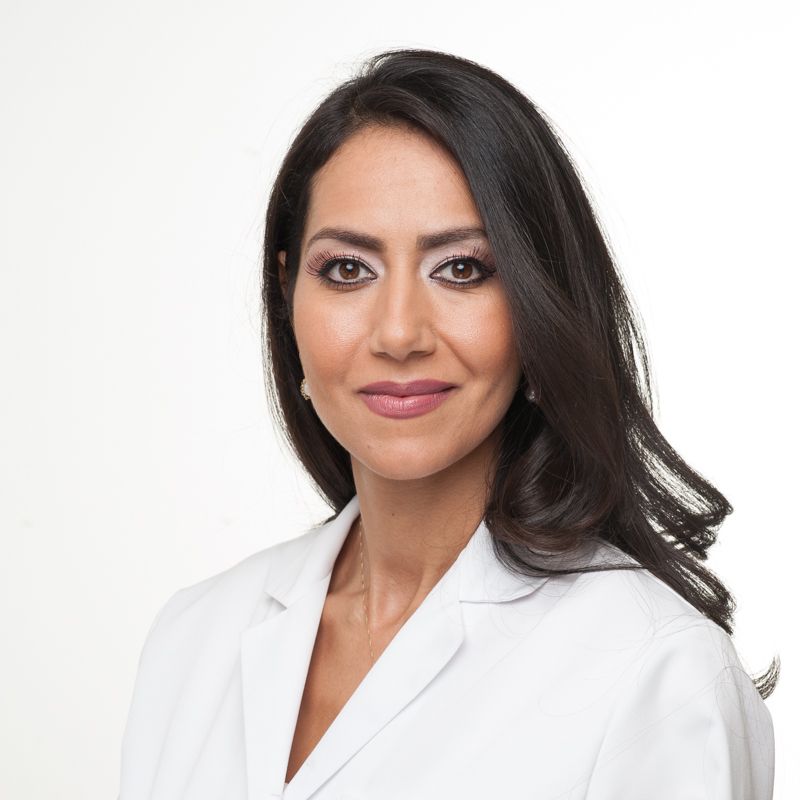
- Esmaeilzadeh in 2014
- Born: April 15, 1980 (age 46); Tehran, Iran
- Education: Karolinska Institutet (M.D, Ph.D.)
- Occupations: Physician, neuroscientist and entrepreneur
- Television: Swedish Power Women, Let's Dance - Dancing with the Stars
- Family: Saeid Esmaeilzadeh
- Website: www.ehab.group

Mouna Esmaeilzadeh (Persian: مونا اسماعیل‌زاده; born April 15, 1980) is an Iranian medical doctor, neuroscientist, entrepreneur, and TV personality. She has a Ph.D. in neuroscience from Stockholm Brain Institute at Karolinska Institutet in Stockholm. Her expertise and know-how has been covered on Swedish national television where she's invited to talk about science, technology, neuroscience, and investments/entrepreneurship. The previous secretary of the Nobel Committee, Alf Lindberg, said that Esmaeilzadeh is one of the leading authorities within the "future of health". She was awarded the "MENSA award of the Year" as well as the "Fact-based Optimist of the Year Award" which was handed out in partnership with Google by Warp Institute, amongst many other awards and recognitions.

== Biography ==
Mouna Esmaeilzadeh was born in Tehran. Barely surviving a dramatic journey as a refugee, she grew up outside Stockholm, Sweden with her family from the age of three. Her older brothers are Saeid Esmaeilzadeh and Hamid Esmaeilzadeh. She had previously been married to Danish serial-entrepreneur Rasmus Ingerslev who is one of the founders of Barry's Bootcamp.

Esmaeilzadeh began her academic career studying philosophy at Stockholm University and completed her master's degree in Philosophy at University of Oslo. She went on to study medicine at Karolinska Institutet receiving her medical license in 2005 and her Ph.D. in neuroscience in 2011 specializing in PET-imaging and the dopamine system in the brain. Her thesis was written at the Department of Clinical Neuroscience at Karolinska Institutet and had the title of "Towards a novel treatment of Huntington's Disease". During her doctorate studies in Neuroscience, she founded the first Philosophical Club at the Karolinska Institute.

== Entrepreneurship ==
Esmaeilzadeh founded SciLife Clinic, one of the world's first longevity clinics, in 2009. SciLife Clinic became the first Sweden-based medical clinic using genetic mapping among other techniques, to prevent diseases like cancer and cardiovascular diseases. Esmaeilzadeh become the personal doctor of some of business leaders, artists and royalties. She sold the clinic in 2016 but she has continued to provide advisory services.

In 2020 Esmaeilzadeh co-founded the family owned investment-company Esmaeilzadeh Holding - EHAB with her brother Saeid Esmaeilzadeh. EHAB was founded on the belief that their experiences as entrepreneurs make them better investors, and that their experiences as investors make them better entrepreneurs. In February 2022, EHAB has over ten platform companies, which in turn own and develop other businesses. The portfolio companies range from AI companies to community properties to dental clinics. The largest holdings are Lyvia Group and Novedo. The same year, EHAB has a total turnover of around 3.5 billion SEK and generate around 0.5 billion SEK in profit. Since the foundation of EHAB, Mouna has been the executive chairman of the board.

== Scholarship ==
Her work on longevity has been cited in medical publications on the subject.

== Public speaking ==
Esmaeilzadeh is a recurring guest at Swedish national TV4 Nyhetsmorgon speaking about popular science, where she covers topics such as longevity, artificial intelligence, and genetics.

She competed as a celebrity dancer in Let's Dance 2022, the Swedish version of Dancing with the Stars, which is broadcast by TV4.
