= OWSD-Elsevier Foundation Award =

Annual award for women scientists

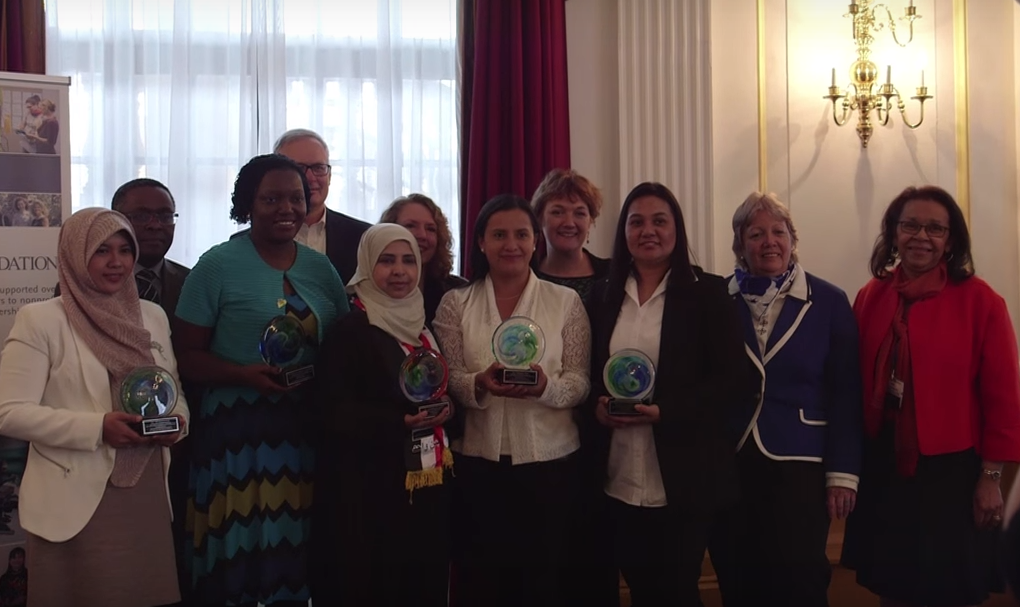
2016 award winners

The OWSD-Elsevier Foundation Awards for Early-Career Women Scientists in the Developing World are awarded annually to early-career women scientists in selected developing countries in four regions: Latin America and the Caribbean, East and Southeast Asia and the Pacific, Central and South Asia, and Sub-Saharan Africa.

The Organization for Women in Science for the Developing World (OWSD), the Elsevier Foundation, and The World Academy of Sciences have partnered to recognize achievements of early-career women scientists in developing countries since the award was launched in 2011 as the Elsevier Foundation-OWSD Awards for Young Women Scientists from the Developing World. The award program is open to female scientists who live and work in one of 81 developing countries. Nominations are generally submitted within ten years of the nominee earning a PhD.

The maximum number of recipients is currently restricted to five per year: one from each of the four OWSD-recognized regions, plus one additional outstanding candidate, and the awards are granted with a rotating theme annually among three general fields: biological sciences (agriculture, biology and medicine), engineering/innovation & technology, and physical sciences (including chemistry, mathematics and physics). There were six awardees in 2022 as two outstanding candidates were recognised.

As of 2014, the award included an honorarium of US$5,000, an entire year of access to Elsevier's ScienceDirect publication database, and an expense-paid trip to the annual meeting of the American Association for the Advancement of Science, where the awarding ceremony is held.

== Recipients ==
Recipients have included:

=== 2011 ===
The 2011 awards recognized eleven contributors to biology, physics, and chemistry.

- Mahfuza Begum, biologist, Bangladesh
- Rukmani Mohanta, physicist, India
- Farzana Shaheen, chemist, Pakistan
- Janet Ayobami Adermola, physicist, Nigeria
- Aderoju Amoke Osowole, chemist, Nigeria
- Denise Evans, biologist, South Africa
- Nahla Ismail, chemist, Egypt
- Lubna Tahtamoouni, biologist, Jordan
- María Magdalena González Sánchez, astrophysicist, Mexico
- Lisset Hermida Cruz, biologist, Cuba
- Silvina Pellegrinet, chemist, Argentina

=== 2013 ===
The 2013 awards were focused on medical science and public health.

- Adediwura Fred-Jaiyesimi, pharmacologist, Nigeria
- Nasima Akhter, medical scientist, Bangladesh
- Dionicia Gamboa, molecular biologist, Peru
- Namjil Erdenechimeg, biochemist, Mongolia
- Huda Omer Basaleem, community health researcher, Yemen

=== 2014 ===
The 2014 awards were focused on chemistry.

- Nilufar Mamadalieva, bioorganic chemist, Uzbekistan
- Leni Ritmaleni, pharmaceutical chemist, Indonesia
- Simone Ann Marie Badal McCreath, biochemistry researcher, Jamaica
- Eqbal Mohammed Abdu Dauqan, biotechnologist, Yemen
- Taiwo Olayemi Elufioye, pharmacologist, Nigeria

=== 2015 ===
In 2015, the awards were focused on physics and mathematics.

- Nashwa Eassa, nano-particle physicist, Sudan
- Dang Thi Oanh, computational mathematician, Thailand
- Mojisola Oluwyemisi Adeniyi, atmospheric physicist, Nigeria
- Mojisola Usikalu, radiation physicist, Nigeria
- Rabia Salihu Sa'id, environmental physicist, Nigeria

=== 2016 ===
The 2016 awards focused on medical science and public health.

- Sri Fatmawati, pharmacologist, Indonesia
- Sushila Maharjan, biochemistry researcher, Nepal
- Magaly Blas, public health specialist, Peru
- Etheldreda Nakimuli-Mpungu, psychiatric epidemiologist, Uganda
- Ghanya Naji Mohammed Al-Naqeb, nutritional researcher, Yemen

=== 2017 ===
The 2017 awards were focused on engineering and technology.

- Tanzima Hashem, computer scientist, Bangladesh
- María Fernanda Rivera Velásquez, environmentalist, Ecuador
- Felycia Edi Soetaredjo, environmental energy specialist, Indonesia
- Grace Ofori-Sarpong, environmental resource management, Ghana
- Rania Mokhtar, scientific project coordinator, Sudan

=== 2018 ===
The 2018 awards focused on mathematics, chemistry, and physics.

- Hasibun Naher, applied mathematician, Bangladesh
- Germaine Djuidje Kenmoe, physicist, Cameroon
- Silvia González Pérez, computational chemist, Ecuador
- Dawn Iona Fox, environmental chemist, Guyana
- Witri Wahyu Lestari, organometallic chemist, Indonesia

=== 2019 ===
The 2019 awards focused on medical science and public health.

- Narel Y. Paniagua-Zambrana, ethnobotanist, Bolivia
- Uduak Okomo, health services, Nigeria
- Tabassum Mumtaz, environmental biotechnologist, Bangladesh
- Amira Shaheen, public health researcher, Palestine
- Tista Prasai Joshi, chemist, Nepal

=== 2020 ===
The 2020 awards recognised researchers working in engineering, innovation and technology.

- Susana Arrechea, chemical engineer and nanotechnologist, Guatemala
- Champika Ellawalla Kankanamge, environmental engineer, Sri Lanka
- Chao Mbogo, computer scientist, Kenya
- Samia Subrina, electronic engineer and nanotechnologist, Bangladesh
- Fathiah Zakham, bioengineer and microbiologist, Yemen

=== 2021 ===
The 2021 awards recognised researchers in the physical sciences.

- María Eugenia Cabrera Catalán, particle physicist, Guatemala
- Khongorzul Dorjgotov, financial mathematician, Mongolia
- Ghada Dushaq, applied physicist and nanotechnologist, Palestine
- Imalka Munaweera, synthetic chemist and nanochemist, Sri Lanka
- Marian Asantewah Nkansah, environmental chemist, Ghana

=== 2022 ===
The 2022 awards recognised six researchers in climate action and the environment.

- Abeer Ahmed Qaed Ahmed, microbiologist, Yemen
- Heyddy Calderon, hydrologist, Nicaragua
- Gawsia Wahidunnessa Chowdhury, aquatic ecologist, Bangladesh
- Flor de Mayo González Miranda, environmental engineer, Guatemala
- Myriam Mujawamariya, forest ecologist and ecophysiologist, Rwanda
- Ashani Savinda Ranathunga, geotechnical engineer, Sri Lanka
