= Saeid Esmaeilzadeh =

Swedish chemist (born 1974)

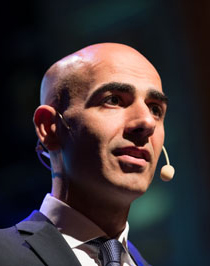
- Born: 12 August 1974 (age 52); Tehran, Iran
- Occupation: Serial entrepreneur
- Family: Mouna Esmaeilzadeh (sister)

Saeid Esmaeilzadeh (born August 12, 1974 in Tehran) is an Iranian-born Swedish scientist with a PhD in Inorganic Chemistry, and a serial entrepreneur who has founded over 30 companies. He is currently the executive chairman and co-founder of the family-owned investment company EHAB, Esmaeilzadeh Holdings.

Previously he has also co-founded Serendipity Group, and is a former adjunct professor in inorganic chemistry at Stockholm University. He was a board member of the Royal Swedish Academy of Engineering Sciences’ Business Executives Council during 2012–2014. Since March 2015, Saeid Esmaeilzadeh is a member of the Swedish Government's reference group of Entrepreneurs and a member of the Entrepreneurship Forum.

He is an elder brother of Mouna Esmaeilzadeh, a doctor, neuroscientist, entrepreneur, and TV personality.

== Biography ==
Saeid Esmaeilzadeh was born in Tehran and moved to Stockholm, Sweden with his family at the age of 8, living in the suburb of Husby northwest of the city. His younger sister is neuroscientist and entrepreneur Mouna Esmaeilzadeh. Esmaeilzadeh started his academic career at Stockholm University where he studied Chemistry and History of Religion, before beginning graduate studies at the age of 21. In 2000 he defended his PhD thesis: Crystal Chemistry of Manganese Tantalum Oxides. In 2002 Esmaeilzadeh became Sweden's youngest associate professor at the age of 28, at the same university.

== Research ==
After his PhD, Esmaeilzadeh worked on a project that set out to study crystals based on silicon nitride. In the experiment, silicon nitride was smelted with additives at high temperatures and was then allowed to cool slowly so that crystals formed in the 1,500 to 2,000 degrees Celsius range. One night something unexpected happened when the cooling system of the furnace malfunctioned, shutting the furnace down and leading the melt to rapidly solidify. This resulted in a small yellowish transparent piece of glass instead of crystals. He gradually discovered that he had created a completely new material. He had managed to find a way to produce nitride-based glass materials with high nitrogen content. It became apparent that the material had high chemical flexibility and that it easily combined with other substances such as metals, while being much harder and having higher thermal resistance. It also became apparent that it had interesting magnetic properties as well as a refractive index nearly as high as that of diamonds. Saeid Esmaeilzadeh applied for a patent for the new glass material and brought on childhood friend and business partner Ashkan Pouya to develop what would ultimately become the materials firm Diamorph AB.

== "Phantom innovation" and "the creative dance" ==
In 2008, Esmaeilzadeh − together with his colleague Ashkan Pouya − published a report by the name of “Phantom Innovation - A Launching Pad for Innovation Processes” that researches and describes the non-linear nature of innovative processes. In this report the expression “phantom innovation” was coined. This term describes the phenomenon that an idea or technical solution at its conception often differs significantly from what ultimately becomes the final innovation that is brought to market. In the report, the pair came to the conclusion that the initial innovation is often changed on the way to commercialization (“the creative dance”) and in many cases is introduced to a different market or fulfills a different need than that which is originally envisaged.

That same year Saeid and Ashkan both won the prize for the "Best Student Paper" at the ISPIM (The International Society for Professional Innovation Management) Symposium in Singapore.

== Serendipity Group ==
Together, Esmaeilzadeh − with his background in research − and Pouya − with his background in business − founded Serendipity innovations in 2004. Esmaeilzadeh is the firm's CEO, and has participated in and founded a number of companies based on academic research. In all, the two have founded over 15 companies within the fields of medical device, biotechnology, advanced materials, clean tech and information technology. These companies include NASDAQ OMX-listed Episurf Medical, a medical technology company that designs and manufactures individually customized implants for cartilage damage in joints, Diamorph, AB an advanced materials company, and OrganoClick a clean technology-company which develops environmentally friendly chemicals for treatment of wood and textiles. OrganoClick has among other awards, received the "Environmental Innovation of the year" in 2008 and was in 2010 admitted to "WWF Climate Solver Programme ". Xbrane Biopharma AB is a biopharmaceutical company specialized in high demand complex generics. The company is involved in developing biogenerics for injectable controlled release drugs and proprietary high-yield protein expression technology for the development of biosimilars.

== Selected awards ==
Esmaeilzadeh was awarded the 2008 Chemistry Technology Prize (Swedish: Kemiteknikpris), 1 kg of silver, from Sveriges Kemiingenjörers Riksförening. He was awarded the prize for his work with materials development.

In 2010 Esmaeilzadeh was awarded, together with Ashkan Pouya, the H.M King Carl XVI Gustaf "Innovative Pioneer of the Year" award (Swedish: Årets Nybyggare Pionjär).

Esmaeilzadeh was a member of the Global Young Academy from 2010 until 2012. In 2011 Esmaeilzadeh won "Stockholmer of the Month" for the following reasons: "Sweden's youngest associate professor. One of 50 Swedes who are going to change the world. Saeid Esmaeilzadeh has received significant praise, awards and distinctions for his research and for his work as an entrepreneur."
