= African Journal of Traditional, Complementary and Alternative Medicines =

- Discipline: Folk medicine
- Language: English

Publication details
- History: 2004–present
- Publisher: African Ethnomedicines Network (Nigeria)
- Frequency: Quarterly
- Open access: Yes
- License: Creative Commons Attribution CC BY
- Impact factor: 0.553 (2015)

Standard abbreviations
- ISO 4: Afr. J. Tradit. Complement. Altern. Med.

Indexing
- CODEN: AJTCAM
- ISSN: 0189-6016 (print); 2505-0044 (web)
- LCCN: 2007203107
- OCLC no.: 57379328

Links
- Journal homepage; Online archive; African Ethnomedicines Network

The African Journal of Traditional, Complementary and Alternative Medicines is a peer-reviewed open access medical journal covering research on medicinal plants, traditional medicine, complementary alternative medicine, and food and agricultural technologies. It is included on Jeffrey Beall's list of "Potential, possible, or probable predatory scholarly open-access journals".

== Abstracting and indexing ==
The journal is abstracted and indexed in:

- Current Contents - Clinical Medicine
- Index Medicus/MEDLINE/PubMed
- Science Citation Index Expanded
- Scopus

According to the Journal Citation Reports, the journal has a 2015 impact factor of 0.506.

== See also ==
- Predatory open access publishing
