= Sophie Carenco =

French chemist

- Education: Université Pierre et Marie Curie (Paris)
- Scientific career
- Thesis: Une nouvelle voie pour la synthèse de nanoparticules de phosphures de métaux à partir du phosphore blanc : applications en catalyse et pour les batteries au lithium (2011)

Sophie Carenco is a researcher at the French National Center for Scientific Research, working on nanochemistry at the Centre Interdisciplinaire de Nanoscience de Marseille (CINaM). Her research focuses on novel synthetic routes of exotic nanomaterials for energy application and catalysis.

== Early life and education ==
Sophie Carenco is from the city of Hyeres in France, and graduated from Ecole Polytechnique in 2008. She obtained her PhD in 2011 from Pierre and Marie Curie University in Paris, working on the synthesis and applications of metal phosphide nanoparticles. From 2012 to 2013, she was a post-doctoral fellow at Lawrence Berkeley National Laboratory in Berkeley, California, in Miquel Salmeron's group working on X-ray spectroscopy at the Advanced Light Source.

== Research and career ==
In 2014, she joined the French National Center for Scientific Research as a researcher in the team Hybrid Materials and Nanomaterials of the Laboratory of Condensed Matter Chemistry of Paris (LCMCP), associated with Sorbonne University and Collège de France, with a L'Oreal-UNESCO-Académie des Sciences Fellowship. In 2017, she was awarded an ERC Starting Grant to work on small molecules activation at the surface of nanoparticles.

Carenco's research during her undergraduate, graduate, and postdoctoral training was on the use of white phosphorus to synthesize nickel-containing nanoparticles which can be constructed into defined sizes, and investigating the catalysis of reactions of nickel nanoparticles with alkynes, and nanoscaled reaction mechanisms with borides and phosphides.

== Selected publications ==
- Carenco, Sophie; Portehault, David; Boissière, Cédric; Mézailles, Nicolas; Sanchez, Clément (2013-10-09). "Nanoscaled Metal Borides and Phosphides: Recent Developments and Perspectives". Chemical Reviews. 113 (10): 7981–8065. doi:10.1021/cr400020d. ISSN 0009-2665. PMID 23767879.
- Carenco, Sophie; Boissière, Cédric; Nicole, Lionel; Sanchez, Clément; Le Floch, Pascal; Mézailles, Nicolas (2010-02-23). "Controlled Design of Size-Tunable Monodisperse Nickel Nanoparticles". Chemistry of Materials. 22 (4): 1340–1349. doi:10.1021/cm902007g. ISSN 0897-4756.
- Carenco, Sophie; Leyva-Pérez, Antonio; Concepción, Patricia; Boissière, Cédric; Mézailles, Nicolas; Sanchez, Clément; Corma, Avelino (2012-02-01). "Nickel phosphide nanocatalysts for the chemoselective hydrogenation of alkynes". Nano Today. 7 (1): 21–28. doi:10.1016/j.nantod.2011.12.003. hdl:10251/65702. ISSN 1748-0132.

== Awards and honors ==
She was awarded the European Young Chemist Award from the European Chemical Society in 2010 and the C'Nano National Award in 2012 for her PhD work. In 2018 she was awarded the Bronze Medal of the CNRS and the Jean Rist Medal. In 2020, she received a Clara Immerwahr award from UniSysCat.
