= Organization for Women in Science for the Developing World =

International organisation supporting women in science

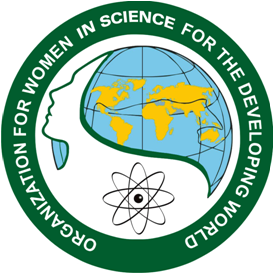
Logo

The Organization for Women in Science for the Developing World (OWSD) is an international organisation that provides research training, career development and networking opportunities for women scientists throughout the developing world at different stages in their career. It was founded in 1987 and was officially launched in 1993. The organisation was formerly known as the Third World Organization for Women in Science (TWOWS). It is a program unit of UNESCO and based at the offices of The World Academy of Sciences in Trieste, Italy.

The organisation aims to unite eminent scientists from the developing and developed world with an objective of supporting their efforts in the development process. It also aims at promoting the representation of its members in the sphere of scientific and technological leadership. It does so through different programs like memberships, fellowships, and awards.

== Objectives ==
Scientific research and advancement is important to generate knowledge and products aimed at solving problems faced by society. The generation of such knowledge is especially important in the developing countries which face numerable problems like poverty, food scarcity, disease, climate change, and many more. Scientific innovation is not only important to find solutions to these problems but can also contribute to local economies. The inclusion of women in this innovation process provides a unique perspective on the local problems. In many developing countries, women have daily needs and routines oriented to their roles as main care-givers to the elderly and children. Women make up the majority of agricultural workers too, growing and harvesting food for their families, as well as collecting fresh water for drinking. If women are included as both participants in scientific research and as the beneficiaries of scientific research, the impact on children, on the elderly and on local communities will be direct and highly effective.

OWSD aims to pursue the following objectives:

a. Increase the participation of women in developing countries in scientific and technological research, teaching and leadership;

b. Promote the recognition of the scientific and technological achievements of women scientists and technologists in developing countries;

c. Promote collaboration and communication among women scientists and technologists in developing countries and with the international scientific community as a whole;

d. Increase access of women in developing countries to the socio-economic benefits of science and technology;

e. Promote the participation of women scientists and technologists in the sustainable and economic development of their country; and

f. Increase understanding of the role of science and technology in supporting women's development activities.

== History ==
The idea for OWSD was first raised at a conference on The Role of Women in the Development of Science and Technology in the Third World in 1988, organized by the World Academy of Sciences, where more than 200 leading women scientists from 63 developing countries participated. A study group consisting of top women scientists and experts was formed to explore the possibility of creating an organization that would champion the experience, needs and skills of women scientists in the developing world. At a further meeting in Trieste in 1989, the Third World Organization for Women in Science (TWOWS) was established and a constitution adopted. TWOWS was officially launched four years later in 1993, at the First General Assembly in Cairo, Egypt.

=== Name change ===
On 29 June 2010, at the organisation's Fourth General Assembly in Beijing, China members voted to adopt the name Organization for Women in Science for the Developing World (OWSD).

== Funding ==
OWSD is funded by external donors.

The Swedish International Development Cooperation Agency (Sida) has supported OWSD financially since 1998 and provides full funding for the postgraduate fellowship programme.

Since 2010, the Elsevier Foundation has provided funding for the OWSD-Elsevier Foundation Awards for Early Career Women Scientists, given to five women scientists from the developing world each year.

In 2017, an agreement was signed with Canada's International Development Research Centre (IDRC) to fully fund a new OWSD fellowship for Early Career Women Scientists.

== National chapters ==
OWSD has national chapters in 30 countries. National chapters organize regional conferences, seminars and workshops, lead national and regional initiatives for women in science, and provide OWSD members with networking opportunities.

== Programmes ==
=== PhD fellowships ===
OWSD PhD fellowships are offered to women from selected science and technology-lagging countries in the developing world to undertake PhD research in the natural sciences, including engineering and information technology, at host institutes in another developing country.

These scholarships cover all costs related to undertaking research in a host country that are not covered by the host institute, including travel, visa and health costs, tuition and bench fees as well as a monthly stipend for the awardees' board, accommodation and living expenses. The fellowship also includes additional funding for each PhD fellow to travel to international workshops and conferences of relevance.

The fellowship is offered as either a full-time (up to four years) or sandwich option, in which the fellow is a registered PhD student in her home country and undertakes a maximum of 3 research visits at the host institute for minimum 6 up to 20 months.

More than 250 women scientists have graduated from the fellowship programme with PhDs since 1998.

The programme is funded by Sida, the Swedish International Development Cooperation Agency.

=== Early career fellowships ===
The OWSD Early Career fellowship is a prestigious award of up to US$50,000 offered to women who have completed their PhDs in science, technology, engineering and mathematics (STEM) subjects and are employed at an academic or scientific research institute in selected science and technology-lagging countries in the developing world. Early career fellows are supported to continue their research at an international level while based at their home institutes and to build up research groups that will attract international visitors.

The Early Career fellowship programme is funded by the International Development Research Centre (IDRC) of Canada.

The first cohort of Early Career fellows was awarded in 2018.

=== OWSD-Elsevier Foundation Awards for Early Career Women Scientists ===
The OWSD-Elsevier Foundation Awards are an annual prize given to reward and encourage women scientists working and living in developing countries who are in the early stages of their careers. Initially launched in 2010, the Awards are presented to five scientists each year, one from each of the four OWSD regions plus an additional exceptional winner from any region. The eligible scientific disciplines for the Awards rotate between the biological sciences, physical sciences and engineering. Each winner receives US$5,000 and presents her research during a special awards ceremony at the American Association for the Advancement of Science (AAAS) annual meeting.

Awardees must have made a demonstrable impact on the research environment both at a regional and international level.

== Membership ==
OWSD has more than 8,000 members from 137 countries. Over 90% of OWSD members are women living and working in developing countries who have master's or doctorate degrees in scientific subjects.

== Leadership ==
OWSD is governed by an executive board, composed of a president, four regional vice presidents and four regional members. All the members of the executive board are elected by the members of the general assembly who vote out of the shortlist of candidates which were selected through an online voting system. All members are invited to attend the general assembly and have the right to participate in its discussions but only full members have the right to vote.

=== List of presidents ===
- 2016–2020: Jennifer A. Thomson (South Africa)
- 2010–2015: Fang Xin (China)
- 2005–2010: Kaiser Jamil (India)
- 1999–2004: Lydia Makhubu (Swaziland)
- 1993–1998: Lydia Makhubu (Swaziland)

== Impact ==
Since its inception in 1987 and launch in 1993, OWSD has grown manifolds in both scope and impact. The organisation celebrated its 25th anniversary in 2018 and released its first Annual Report. The report highlighted the membership of over 7,100 scientists from more than 150 countries. It also detailed the work of the organization through its headquarters in Italy and the 20 other national chapters in developing countries across the globe.

OWSD's flagship programme has been the South-to-South PhD fellowship programme, which aims at supporting the mobility of women scientists. The fellowship provides support to women from scientifically- and technologically-lagging countries (STLCs) to undertake PhD research at a host institution of recognized research excellence in another developing country. In the past ten years, a total of 314 fellowships have been awarded. By 2018, 251 fellows had successfully graduated and a further 193 were enrolled and completing their studies.

In 2018, OWSD launched an Early-Career fellowship program. This fellowship is funded by the Canadian International Development Research Centre (IDRC) and greatly increases the impact of the organization. It expands the scope of OWSD's programmes by providing fellowships to scientists in the early stages of their career. The first cohort included 19 candidates from 11 different countries.
