= List of University of Cape Town faculty =

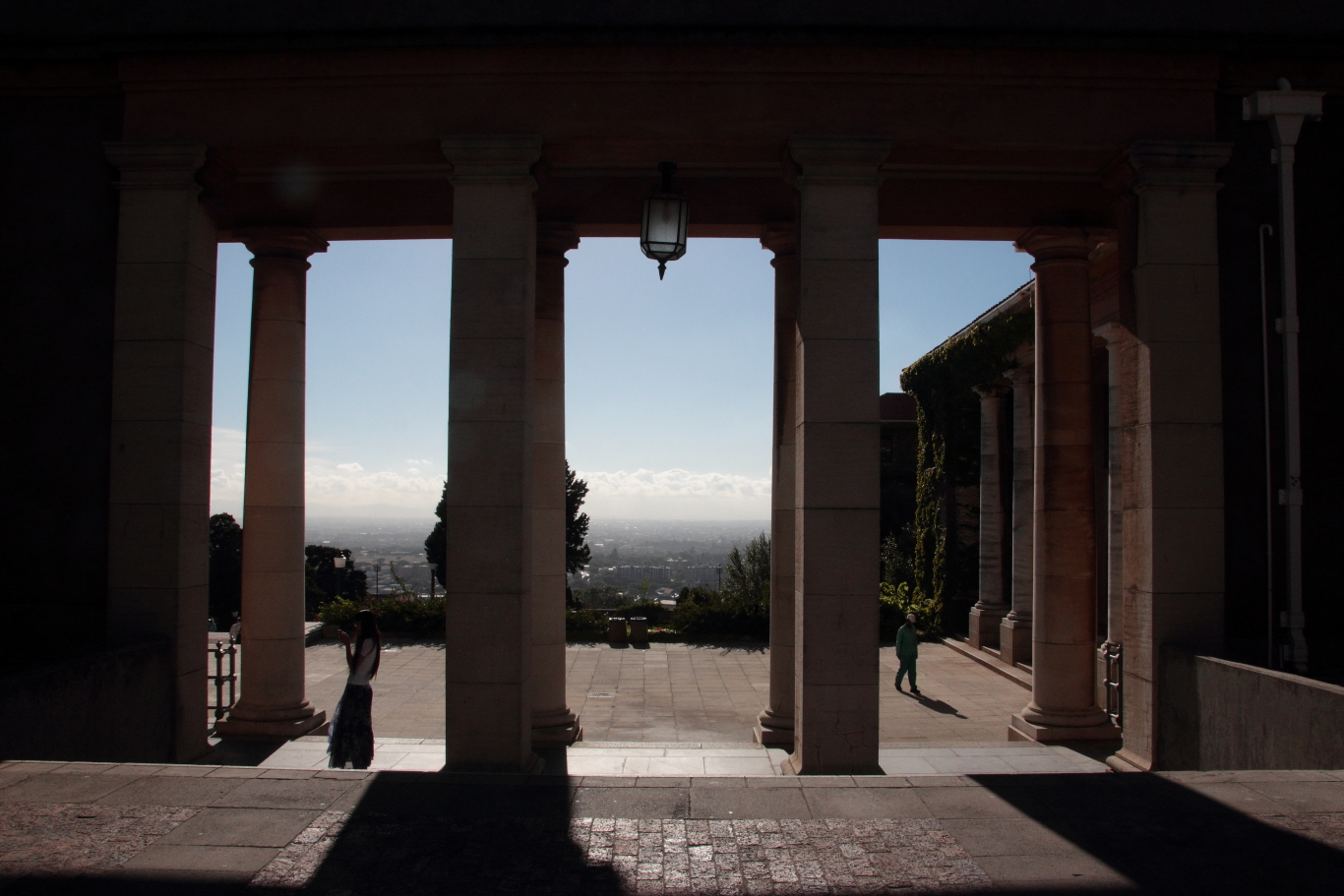
The Jagger Library at the University of Cape Town

This list of University of Cape Town faculty includes current, emeritus, former, and deceased professors, lecturers, and researchers. Faculty members who have become Institute Professors, or have earned other significant awards and made significant contributions are listed below.

== Commerce ==
- Haroon Bhorat, South African Research Chair in economic growth, poverty and inequality
- Justine Burns, behavioural economist and head of the School of Economics
- Owen Horwood (1916–1998), economist
- William Harold Hutt (1899–1988), professor of commerce and theorist of consumer sovereignty
- Murray Leibbrandt, South African Research Chair in poverty and inequality research
- Nicoli Nattrass, development economist
- Hector Menteith Robertson (1905–1984), Jagger professor of economics
- Francis Wilson (1939–2022), founder and director of the Southern African Labour and Development Research Unit
- Ingrid Woolard, professor of economics

== Engineering and the Built Environment ==
- George Ekama OMS, professor of water quality engineering
- Sue Harrison, South African Research Chair in bioprocess engineering, deputy vice-chancellor
- Patricia J. Kooyman, South African Research Chair in nanomaterials for catalysis
- Alison Lewis, director of the Crystallisation and Precipitation Research Unit
- Jo Noero, director of the School of Architecture and Planning
- Edgar Pieterse, South African Research Chair in urban policy, director of the African Centre for Cities
- Pragasen Pillay OMS, professor of electrical engineering
- Abimbola Windapo, professor of construction management
- Alphose Zingoni, professor of structural engineering and mechanic

== Health Sciences ==
- Frances Ames SSA (1920–2002), head of neurology, led medical ethics inquiry into the death of Steve Biko
- Christiaan Barnard (1922–2001), professor of surgical science, head surgeon in the first successful human-to-human heart transplant
- Peter Beighton OMB (1934–2023), professor of human genetics
- Linda-Gail Bekker, director of the Desmund Tutu HIV Centre
- Eric Crichton (1888–1962), first professor of obstetrics and gynaecology
- George Daniell (1864–1937), anaesthetist
- T. B. Davie (1895–1955), vice-chancellor, namesake of the T. B. Davie Memorial Lecture
- Lynette Denny GCOB (1958–2024), head of obstetrics and gynaecology
- Wim de Villiers, dean of the Faculty of Health Sciences
- Keertan Dheda, professor of respiratory medicine
- Tania Douglas (1969–2021), South African Research Chair in biomedical engineering and innovation
- A. W. Falconer (1880–1954), first professor of medicine
- Wieland Gevers OMS, professor of medical biochemistry
- Charles Maclay (1913–1978), senior lecturer in anatomy
- Salome Maswime, head of global surgery
- Bongani Mayosi OMS (1967–2018), professor of cardiology, dean of the Faculty of Health Sciences
- Valerie Mizrahi OMS, director of the Institute of Infectious Disease and Molecular Medicine
- Elmi Muller, head of general surgery
- Daniel Ncayiyana, deputy vice-chancellor
- Tim Noakes OMS, professor of exercise and sports science
- Tolullah Oni, epidemiologist
- Lionel Opie OMS (1933–2020), cardiologist
- Stuart Saunders GCOB (1931–2021), professor of medicine, vice-chancellor
- Dan Stein, professor of psychiatry
- Kit Vaughan, professor of biomedical engineering
- Lee A. Wallis, head of emergency medicine
- Anna-Lise Williamson, South African Research Chair in virology
- Carolyn Williamson, professor of medical virology
- Ambroise Wonkam, professor of medical genetics
- Heather Zar, director of the School of Child and Adolescent Health
- Liesl Zühlke, professor of paediatric cardiology, director of the Children's Heart Disease Research Unit

== Humanities ==
=== African Studies ===
- Harry Garuba (1958–2020), professor of African studies and English
- A. C. Jordan OIG (1906–1968), lecturer in African languages, namesake of the A. C. Jordan Building
- Mahmood Mamdani, inaugural A. C. Jordan professor of African studies
- Lungisile Ntsebeza, South African Research Chair in land reform and democracy in South Africa
- Ernst Westphal (1919–1990), professor of African languages

=== Anthropology ===
- Harriet Ngubane (1929–2007), professor of social anthropology
- Alfred Radcliffe-Brown (1881–1955), professor of social anthropology
- Monica Wilson (1908–1982), professor of social anthropology

=== Classics ===
- John Atkinson (1938–2022), ancient historian, dean of the Faculty of Arts
- Lydia Baumbach (1924–1991), professor of classics
- Kathleen Coleman, classicist
- Benjamin Farrington (1891–1974), classicist
- Margaret Hewett (1934–2022), expert on Roman-Dutch law
- Maurice Pope (1926–2019), professor of classics, dean of the Faculty of Humanities
- William Rollo (1892–1960), head of classics, dean of the Faculty of Arts
- David Wardle, head of classics

=== Film and Media Studies ===
- Mary Watson, lecturer in film studies

=== Languages and Literatures ===
- Breyten Breytenbach, visiting professor in the Graduate School of Humanities from January 2000, author
- André Brink OIS (1935–2015), professor of English language and literature
- Leslie Casson (1903–1969), professor of medieval literature
- J. M. Coetzee OMG, professor of literature, 2003 Nobel Prize in Literature
- Imraan Coovadia, director of creative writing
- Johannes du Plessis Scholtz (1900–1990), professor of Afrikaans and Dutch
- Yasin Dutton, professor of Arabic
- Joan Hambidge, professor of languages and literatures
- Peter Horn (1934–2019), head of German language and literature
- D. J. Opperman (1914–1985), Afrikaans poet
- Tom Raworth (1938–2017), English poet
- Tzili Reisenberger, head of Hebrew language and literature
- Jenefer Shute, lecturer in English
- Kelwyn Sole, professor of English literature
- Etienne van Heerden, Hofmeyr Professor of languages and literatures
- Stephen Watson (1954–2011), professor of English

=== Linguistics ===
- Frederick Bodmer (1894–1960), philologist
- Roger Lass, historical linguist

=== Gender Studies ===
- Jane Bennett, director of the African Gender Institute
- Amina Mama, director of the African Gender Institute

=== History ===
- Mohamed Adhikari, professor of history
- Carolyn Hamilton, South African Research Chair in archive and public culture
- Milton Shain, Jewish historian
- Eric A. Walker (1886–1976), professor of history
- Jean van der Poel (1904–1986), lecturer in history
- Nigel Worden, historian of slavery

=== Performance Studies ===
- Eduard Greyling, lecturer in the School of Ballet
- Elizabeth Triegaardt, director of the School of Dance
- Rosalie van der Gucht (1908–1985), head of speech and drama

=== Philosophy ===
- David Benatar, professor of philosophy
- David H. M. Brooks (1950–1996), professor of philosophy
- Peter Collins, lecturer in philosophy
- Jeremy Cronin, lecturer in philosophy
- Martin Versfeld (1909–1995), professor of philosophy

=== Political Studies ===
- Annette Seegers, professor of political studies
- Hermann Giliomee, professor of political studies

=== Psychology ===
- Floretta Boonzaier, professor of psychology
- Kerry Gibson, senior lecturer in psychology
- Pumla Gobodo-Madikizela, professor of psychology
- Mark Solms, professor of neuropsychology and neuropsychoanalysis

=== Religious Studies ===
- John Painter, theologian
- Sa'diyya Shaikh, professor of religious studies, director of the Centre for Contemporary Islam
- Charles Villa-Vicencio, professor of religion and society, director of the Truth and Reconciliation Commission
- Charles A. Wanamaker, professor of Christian studies

=== Sociology ===
- Zethu Matebeni, senior researcher at the Institute for Humanities in Africa
- Amrita Pande, professor of sociology
- Deborah Posel, founder of the Institute for Humanities in Africa
- Jeremy Seekings, professor of sociology
- Ari Sitas OMS, professor of sociology
- H. W. van der Merwe (1929–2001), founder of the Centre for Intergroup Studies, emeritus honorary professor

== Law ==
- Jan Brand (1823–1888), inaugural professor of law
- Hugh Corder, professor of public law
- Drucilla Cornell (1950–2022), South African Research Chair in customary law, indigenous values and dignity jurisprudence
- Dennis Davis, professor of commercial law, judge president of the Competition Appeal Court
- Pierre de Vos, professor of constitutional law
- Johannes Christiaan de Wet (1912–1990), Schreiner professor of Roman law
- Raylene Keightley, senior lecturer in law, judge
- Rashida Manjoo, professor of public law, United Nations' Special Rapporteur on Violence Against Women
- Donald Molteno (1908–1972), professor of public law
- Rob Nairn (1939–2023), professor of law and criminology, Director of the Institute of Criminology
- Caroline Ncube, South African Research Chair in intellectual property, innovation, and development
- Kate O'Regan, senior lecturer in law, honorary professor, justice of the Constitutional Court of South Africa
- Nicola Peart, lecturer
- Albie Sachs, honorary professor of public law
- Philippe-Joseph Salazar, distinguished professor in rhetoric, director of the Centre for Rhetoric Studies
- Jack Simons (1907–1995), professor of African law and administration
- David Unterhalter, professor of law, judge
- Belinda van Heerden, professor of law, judge

== Sciences ==
- Louis H. Ahrens (1918–1990), head of geochemistry
- Zvi Ben-Avraham, Max Sonnenberg professor of marine geoscience
- Linda M. Haines, professor of statistics
- Johann Lutjeharms OMS (1944–2011), professor of ocean climatology, founding director of the Centre for Marine Studies
- Michael Meadows, professor of physical geography

=== Archaeology ===
- A. J. H. Goodwin (1900–1959), head of archaeology
- Martin Hall, professor of historical archaeology, deputy vice-chancellor
- Judith Sealy, South African Research Chair in stable isotopes, archaeology and palaeoenvironmental studies
- Julia Lee-Thorp, professor of archaeology
- John Parkington, professor of archaeology

=== Astronomy ===
- Michael William Feast (1926–2019), director of the South African Astronomical Observatory, honorary professor
- Renée C. Kraan-Korteweg, head of astronomy, founder and co-director of the Astrophysics, Cosmology and Gravity Centre
- Brian Warner (1939–2023), professor of astronomy, emeritus distinguished professor of natural philosophy
- Patricia Whitelock, director of the South African Astronomical Observatory, honorary professor
- Donald Kurtz, professor of astronomy

=== Biology ===
- Anusuya Chinsamy-Turan, vertebrate paleontologist
- Robert Compton (1886–1979), Harold Pearson professor of botany, director of the National Botanic Gardens
- John H. Day (1909–1989), marine biologist and invertebrate zoologist, namesake of the John Day Building
- Phil Hockey (1956–2013), professor of ornithology, director of the Percy FitzPatrick Institute of African Ornithology
- Lancelot Hogben (1895–1975), professor of zoology
- Brian Huntley, conservationist
- Margaret Levyns (1980–1975), botanist
- Henry Harold Welch Pearson (1870–1916), Harry Bolus professor of botany, namesake of the H. W. Pearson Building
- Edith Layard Stephens (1884–1966), botanist
- Thomas Alan Stephenson (1898–1961), professor of zoology
- David Thoday (1883–1964), Harry Bolus professor of botany
- Jennifer Thomson, professor of biology

=== Chemistry ===
- Kelly Chibale, professor of chemistry, founding director of the Holistic Drug Discovery and Development Centre
- Paul Daniel Hahn (1849–1919), Jamieson professor of experimental physics and practical chemistry, later professor of chemistry, namesake of the P. D. Hahn Building
- Harry Irving (1905–1993), professor of analytical science
- Janet Scott (1964–2022), lecturer in chemistry

=== Information Technology ===
- Frederick Goldstein (1944–2017), head of information technology
- Jean-Paul van Belle, head of information technology

=== Mathematics ===
- Chris Brink, professor of mathematics
- Alexander Brown (1877–1948), professor of mathematics
- Doug Butterworth OMS, professor of applied mathematics
- Kathy Driver, professor of mathematics and dean of the Faculty of Science
- Peter Dunsby, professor of gravitation and cosmology, co-director of the Astrophysics, Cosmology and Gravity Centre
- George Ellis OMS, distinguished professor of complex systems, collaborator with Stephen Hawking and winner of the 2004 Templeton Prize
- Francis Guthrie (1831–1899), professor of mathematics
- Charles Hellaby, cosmologist, associate professor of mathematics
- Daya Reddy OMB, South African Research Chair in computational mechanics

=== Physics ===
- Carruthers Beattie (1866–1946), professor of applied mathematics and experimental physics, vice-chancellor, namesake of the Beattie Building
- Jean Cleymans (1944–2021), professor of physics
- Allan Macleod Cormack (1924–1998), lecturer in physics, 1979 Nobel Prize in Physiology or Medicine
- Reginald W. James (1891–1964), professor of physics, acting vice-chancellor, namesake of the R. W. James Building
- Johann Rafelski, professor of theoretical physics
- Basil Schonland OMG (1896–1972), professor of physics
- Amanda Weltman, South African Research Chair in physical cosmology

== Other staff ==
- Walter Baets, former director of the Graduate School of Business
- Jo Beall, former deputy vice-chancellor
- Naledi Pandor, Minister of International Relations and Cooperation, former senior lecturer in the academic support programme
- Ebrahim Patel, Minister of Trade and Industry and Minister of Economic Development, former staffer in the Southern African Labour and Development Research Unit
- Hamilton Naki OMB, laboratory assistant to cardiac surgeon Christiaan Barnard
- Helen Zille, Mayor of Cape Town and Premier of the Western Cape, former director of public relations for the university

== See also ==
- List of vice-chancellors of the University of Cape Town
- List of alumni of the University of Cape Town
