= Amrita Pande =

Indian sociologist and ethnographer

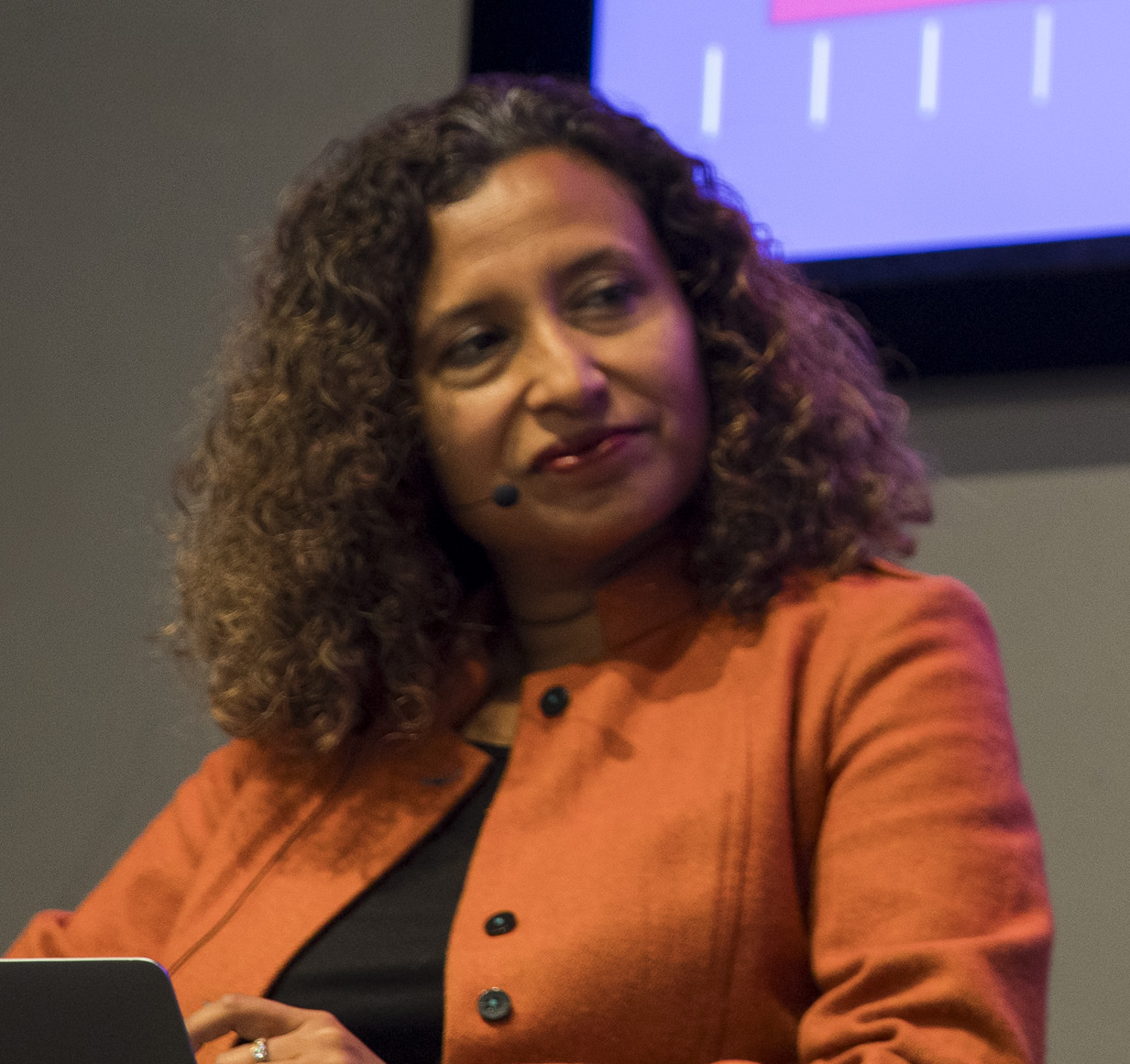
Amrita Pande (2025)

Amrita Pande is an Indian sociologist and feminist ethnographer based in South Africa, tenured as a professor at the University of Cape Town. She was the first to publish a detailed ethnographical study on the surrogacy industry in India with her book Wombs in Labor (2014). Pande has also been appointed as the lead for the National Research Foundation project into the surrogacy industry of South Africa.

== Biography ==
Pande was born in India to an academic family and graduated from the University of Delhi with a Bachelor of Arts in economics followed by a Master of Arts at the Delhi School of Economics. She states that the practice and curriculum at the premier but inflexible and apolitical institute killed her interest in the field and from which she sought refuge through the discipline of sociology. Eventually, she earned a Master of Arts from the University of Massachusetts and completed her doctoral studies in transnational surrogacy, sustained by a fellowship from the public university.

She conducted her post doctoral research among African domestic workers in Tripoli, Lebanon and was eventually tenured as a lecturer at the University of Cape Town in 2010. Between 2010 and 2014, she would occasionally visit India for her research into transnational commercial surrogacy and eventually published Wombs in Labor in 2014. The work was published and described by the Columbia University Press as the first detailed ethnographical study into the transnational surrogacy industry in India. Her work has also been cited in a Yale Law Journal paper on anti-discrimination and family law.

Pande's works have been published in a number of international journals including Anthropologica, Qualitative Sociology, Current Sociology, Critical Social Policy, Feminist Studies and International Migration Review. The South African National Research Foundation has appointed her to lead a project into the surrogacy industry in the country. One of her papers was quoted by the Centre for Social Research in its own study into the surrogacy industry in India.

The Guardian notes that the media in India frames surrogacy either in terms of a great positive, as a boom of a life changing sum of money or as a great negative of poverty stricken women being forced into "renting wombs", a binary which according to Pande is detrimental to discourse and removes agency from the women involved. She has occasionally appeared as a subject matter expert on op-eds in various national newspapers such as The Hindu and Mail & Guardian, and in various international news outlets such as on the BBC show conducted by Laurie Taylor, on Sarah Carey's show on Newstalk and on the Danish channel DR2 show called Deadline. She also works as a performer-educator with a multimedia theatre production called Made in India: Notes from a Baby Farm, which is based on her work on the surrogacy industry.
