= Elmi =

Elmi is a name which can serve as a given name and as a surname.

Notable people with the given name:

- Elmi Roble Warfa (died 1934), Somali King of the Gadabuursi's
- Elmi Ahmed Duale (born 1935), Somali physician, diplomat and politician
- Elmi Boodhari (born 1908), Somaliland poet
- Elmi Muller, South African medical specialist and President of the Southern African Transplantation Society
- Elmi Duale, Somali diplomat
- Elmi Hassan, apprentice baker, Norway Kolonihagen Bakeri

Notable people with the surname:

- Abdiwahid Elmi Gonjeh, Somali politician
- Adan Ahmed Elmi (born 1966), Minister of Agriculture of Somaliland
- Abdiaziz Nur Elmi Koor, Somali politician
- Ahmed Elmi Osman, Somali politician
- Aidin Elmi (born 1986), Indonesian footballer
- Asha Haji Elmi (born 1962), Somali politician and peace activist
- Ayan Elmi (born 1988 or 1989), Somali model
- Dahir Adan Elmi, Somali military general
- Guido Elmi (born 1935), Italian former swimmer
- Idiris Muse Elmi (died 2010), Somali politician
- Iidle Elmi (born 1995), Somali born Finnish footballer
- Maria Giovanna Elmi (born 1940), Italian former television announcer, presenter, journalist, actress and singer
- Mohamed Ibrahim Elmi, Kenyan politician
- Yacin Elmi Bouh (born 1962), Djiboutian politician
