= Jane Bennett =

Jane Bennett may refer to:

- Jane Bennett (artist) (born 1960), Australian painter
- Jane Bennett (feminist scholar)
- Jane Bennett (political theorist) (born 1957), American philosopher
- Jane Bennett, a character in the novel Pride and Prejudice
