= Dumisani Mzamane =

- Born: Dumisani Vuyisile Andrew Mzamane; February 18, 1932
- Died: October 4, 1997 (aged 65)
- Occupation: Medical Doctor

Dumisani Vuyisile Andrew Mzamane; 18 February 1932 – 4 October 1997 was a former head of the Baragwanath Hospital renal unit and the first black nephrologist in South Africa and a human rights activist.

== Early life ==
Dumisani was born on the 18th February 1932. In 1955 He graduated with a Bachelor of Science - Chemistry, Zoology from Rhodes University.

== Work ==
Dumisani was the first black nephrologist in South Africa and stood among the individuals who bravely voiced their concerns about the disparities in renal care for black patients. Despite his unwavering dedication to protest, he died before witnessing any meaningful advancements in renal facilities. The Dumisani Mzamane African Institute of Kidney Disease in Chris Hani Baragwanath Hospital is a tribute to him.

== Medical ethics ==
In the late 1970s various activist health worker organisations were formed opposing apartheid policies. These included the Transvaal Medical Society which later became the Health Workers’ Association with Wits doctors Dr Dumisani Mzamane as its first President and Dr Yosuf Veriava its vice-president.

Mzamane was also a human rights activist, and was one of six doctors, who questioned the ethics of the medical establishment and the previous South African government after the death, in custody, of Steve Biko, the Black Consciousness leader, in September 1977. In 1985 two groups of doctors challenged in court the decision of the South African Medical and Dental Council not to launch a formal investigation into the conduct of the doctors who were negligent in their duties prior to the death in detention of Mr Steve Biko. They were Frances Ames from the University of Cape Town, Phillip Tobias and Trefor Jenkins; Yosuf Veriava, Tim Wilson and Dumisani Mzamane comprised the other group.

The latter were all joint Wits/TPA appointments.
