= NASSP =

NASSP may refer to:

- National Association of Secondary School Principals
- North American Society for Social Philosophy
- National Astrophysics and Space Science Programme, the space research organization of South Africa
