= Dunsby (surname) =

Dunsby is a surname, mostly used in English-speaking countries. Notable people with the surname include:

- Adam Dunsby (born 1967), American businessman, financier, and politician
- Brian Dunsby (1940–2025), British entrepreneur
- Jakob Dunsby (born 2000), Norwegian footballer
- Jonathan Dunsby (born 1953), British classical pianist, musicologist, author and translator
- Peter Dunsby (born 1966), South African cosmologist
