= Zingoni =

Zingoni is a surname. Notable people with the surname include:

- Alphose Zingoni (born 1962), South African engineer and mechanic
- Pete Zingoni (born 1981), American ice hockey player

== See also ==
- Zigoni
