= Ann Cooper =

Ann, Anne or Annie Cooper may refer to:

== Fictional characters ==
- Ann Cooper or Gidget, a fictional character created by Frederick Kohner
  - Anne Cooper, in the TV series Gidget, based on the character
- Anne Cooper, in the film Desperate Remedies

== People, first and last ==
- Ann Cooper (journalist), foreign correspondent and Committee to Protect Journalists executive director
- Anne Cooper (camogie) in Gael Linn Cup 1988 FF 12 (Dublin)
- Anna E. Cooper (1897–1988), Liberian educator
- Anna J. Cooper (1858–1964), African-American author, academic and educator
- Ann Nixon Cooper (1902–2009), African-American representative
- Ann Westine Cooper, managed the .us ccTLD's policies
- Annie Lee Cooper (1910–2010), American civil rights activist

== People, first and middle ==
- Ann Cooper Hewitt (1914–1956), wealthy American heiress who was sterilized against her will
- Ann Cooper Whitall (1716–1797), American Quaker
- Annie Cooper Boyd (1864–1941), née Cooper, American feminist, watercolorist and diarist

== People, middle and middle ==
- Jane Ann Cooper Bennett, known as Jane Bennett, Australian painter

== People, middle and last ==
- Linda Ann Cooper, known as Linda Cooper, New Zealand politician
- Sally Ann Cooper, known as Sally Cooper, Australian cricket player
- Jacqueline Anne Cooper, known as Jacki Cooper, Australian jazz singer
- Lisa Ann Cooper, ex-wife of Chris Sarandon
