= Tania Douglas =

Biomedical engineering professor

- Died: March 20, 2021
- Education: University of Cape Town; Vanderbilt University; University of Strathclyde (PhD)
- Scientific career
- Fields: Biomedical Engineering
- Workplaces: University of Cape Town

Tania S. Douglas was a Professor of Biomedical Engineering, Research Chair in Biomedical Engineering and Innovation as well as Director of the Medical Imaging Research Unit in the University of Cape Town (UCT), South Africa. She conducted research concerning medical innovation, image analysis, and the development of technologies to improve medical device innovation in South Africa. She was also the founding Editor-in-Chief of Global Health Innovation, a journal which disseminates research results about health innovation in developing settings.

== Early life and education ==
Douglas was the daughter of Aubrey Douglas, a high school principal, and Rita Douglas. She attended Pacaltsdorp High in George, Western Cape. She earned a bachelor's degree in Electrical and Electronic engineering in the University of Cape Town (UCT). She completed her master's degree in Vanderbilt University, Tennessee, in Biomedical Engineering. She then continued in a postgraduate doctoral degree in Bioengineering in the University of Strathclyde, Scotland. She finished her education with a master of business administration (MBA) from the University of Cape Town. She was a fellow of the South African Academy of Engineering and a member of the Academy of Science of South Africa.

== Research and career ==
After her studies, Douglas completed a research fellowship in image processing at the Japan Broadcasting Corporation in Tokyo from January 1999 until August 2000. She then started teaching at UCT (University of Cape Town) in 2000 in the Biomedical Engineering department and became convenor of the Biomedical Engineering Program in 2007. In 2008 she was a Humboldt Research fellow at the Max Planck Institute for Neurological Research in Cologne, as well as in the Free University of Berlin and an Honorary Senior Research Fellow at University College London. In 2010, she became Director of the Medical Imaging Research Unit and in 2013 Deputy Dean of the UCT Research in the Faculty of Health Sciences. She was elected South African Research Chair in Biomedical Engineering & Innovation in 2016.

She worked on several projects on health technology innovation at universities in Africa, including "Developing Innovative Interdisciplinary Biomedical Engineering Programs" in Africa with Northwestern University and Universities of Lagos and Ibadan, as well as "African Biomedical Engineering Mobility" with Kenyatta University, Cairo University, Addis Ababa University, the Mbarara University of Science and Technology, the University of Lagos and the University of Pisa.

Douglas was Editor-in-Chief of Global Health Innovation, a research journal for a non-profit organisation which designs, implements and manages programs that develop life-saving solutions. The journal launched in 2018, and in the same year, she gave a TED Talk titled "To design better tech, understand context". She regularly carried out research on methods of helping underdeveloped countries with biomedical techniques. She participated in the publishing of more than 120 articles, and gave talks about biomedical innovation and about women in leadership roles.

== Awards and recognition ==
In 2015, Douglas was awarded the SARCHI Chair in Biomendical Engineering and Innovation. In 2016, along with Jill Fortuin, she received the NRF Community Engagement Award. In 2018 she was elected a member of the Quartz Africa Innovators, a group of 30 African thinkers.

== Death ==
On 20 March 2021, Douglas died of cancer. Institute of Physics and Engineering in Medicine (IPEM) CEO Phil Morgan said: "This is such shocking and sad news. We give thanks for all Tania contributed as a colleague of IPEM, and send our sincere condolences to her family, friends and wider circle. She will be remembered with great affection and immense respect."
