= Frances Ames =

South African physician

- Born: Frances Rix Ames; 20 April 1920; Pretoria, South Africa
- Died: 11 November 2002 (aged 82); Rondebosch, South Africa
- Education: University of Cape Town
- Known for: Exposing medical neglect of Steve Biko
- Medical career
- Institutions: Groote Schuur Hospital, Valkenberg Hospital
- Awards: Star of South Africa

Frances Rix Ames (/ˈfrɑːnsɪz eɪmz/; 20 April 1920 – 11 November 2002) was a South African neurologist, psychiatrist, and human rights activist, best known for leading the medical ethics inquiry into the death of anti-apartheid activist Steve Biko, who died from medical neglect after being tortured in police custody. When the South African Medical and Dental Council (SAMDC) declined to discipline the chief district surgeon and his assistant who treated Biko, Ames and a group of five academics and physicians raised funds and fought an eight-year legal battle against the medical establishment. Ames risked her personal safety and academic career in her pursuit of justice, taking the dispute to the South African Supreme Court, where she eventually won the case in 1985.

Born in Pretoria and raised in poverty in Cape Town, Ames became the first woman to receive a Doctor of Medicine degree from the University of Cape Town in 1964. Ames studied the effects of cannabis on the brain and published several articles on the subject. Seeing the therapeutic benefits of cannabis on patients in her own hospital, she became an early proponent of legalization for medicinal use. She headed the neurology department at Groote Schuur Hospital before retiring in 1985, but continued to lecture at Valkenberg and Alexandra Hospital. After apartheid was dismantled in 1994, Ames testified at the Truth and Reconciliation Commission about her work on the "Biko doctors" medical ethics inquiry. In 1999, Nelson Mandela awarded Ames the Star of South Africa, the country's highest civilian award, in recognition of her work on behalf of human rights.

== Early life ==
Ames was born at Voortrekkerhoogte in Pretoria, South Africa, on 20 April 1920, to Frank and Georgina Ames, the second of three daughters. Her mother, who was raised in a Boer concentration camp by Ames' grandmother, a nurse in the Second Boer War, was also a nurse. Ames never knew her father, who abandoned his wife and three daughters.

With her mother unable to care for her family, Ames spent part of her childhood in a Catholic orphanage where she was stricken with typhoid fever. Her mother later rejoined the family and moved them to Cape Town, where Ames attended the Rustenburg School for Girls. She enrolled at the University of Cape Town (UCT) medical school where she received her MBChB degree in 1942.

== Medical career ==
External image
- Portrait of Frances Ames (SAMJ)

In Cape Town, Ames interned at Groote Schuur Hospital; she also worked in the Transkei region as a general practitioner. She earned her MD degree in 1964 from UCT, the first woman to do so. Ames became head of the neurology department at Groote Schuur Hospital in 1976. She was made an associate professor in 1978. Ames retired in 1985, but continued to work part-time at both Valkenberg and Alexandra Hospital as a lecturer in the UCT Psychiatry and Mental Health departments. In 1997, UCT made Ames an associate professor emeritus of neurology; she received an honorary doctorate in medicine from UCT in 2001. According to Pat Sidley of the British Medical Journal, Ames "was never made a full professor, and believed that this was because she was a woman."

== Biko affair ==
South African anti-apartheid activist Steve Biko, who had formerly studied medicine at the University of Natal Medical School, was detained by Port Elizabeth security police on 18 August 1977 and held for 20 days. Sometime between 6 and 7 September, Biko was beaten and tortured into a coma. According to allegations by Ames and others, surgeon Ivor Lang, along with chief district surgeon Benjamin Tucker, collaborated with the police and covered up the abuse, leading to Biko's death from his injuries on 12 September. According to Benatar & Benatar 2012, "there were clear ethical breaches on the part of the doctors who were responsible" for Biko.

"In those days many district surgeons found themselves able to overlook regular police torture in prisons, to comply with police orders that conflicted with medically appropriate treatment, and at best to remain silent in the face of the obvious ethical challenges posed by the political climate. Few voiced their opposition to the systematic breaches of medical ethics occasioned by apartheid. Ames was one of the few."

— Pat Sidley

When the South African Medical and Dental Council (SAMDC) along with the support of the Medical Association of South Africa (MASA), declined to discipline the district surgeons in Biko's death, two groups of physicians filed separate formal complaints with the SAMDC regarding the lack of professionalism shown by Biko's doctors. Both cases made their way to the South African Supreme Court in an attempt to force the SAMDC to conduct a formal inquiry into the medical ethics of Lang and Tucker. One case was filed by Ames, along with Trefor Jenkins and Phillip Tobias of the University of the Witwatersrand; a second case was filed by Dumisani Mzamane, Yosuf Veriava of Coronationville Hospital, and Tim Wilson of Alexandra Health Centre.

As Ames and the small group of physicians pursued an inquiry into members of their own profession, Ames was called a whistleblower. Her position at the university was threatened by her superiors and her colleagues asked her to drop the case. By pursuing the case against the Biko doctors, Ames received personal threats and risked her safety. Baldwin-Ragaven et al. note that the medical association "closed ranks in support of colleagues who colluded with the security police in the torture and death of detainees [and] also attempted to silence and discredit those doctors who stood up for human rights and who demanded disciplinary action against their colleagues."

After eight years, Ames won the case in 1985 when the South African Supreme Court ruled in her favor. With Ames' help, the case forced the medical regulatory body to reverse their decision. The two doctors who treated Biko were finally disciplined and major medical reforms followed. According to Benatar & Benatar 2012, the case "played an important role in sensitising the medical profession to medical ethical issues in South Africa."

== Cannabis research ==
Ames studied the effects of cannabis in 1958, publishing her work in The British Journal of Psychiatry as "A clinical and metabolic study of acute intoxication with Cannabis sativa and its role in the model psychoses". Her work is cited extensively throughout the cannabis literature. She opposed the war on drugs and was a proponent of the therapeutic benefits of cannabis, particularly for people with multiple sclerosis (MS).

Ames observed first-hand how cannabis (known as dagga in South Africa) relieved spasm in MS patients and helped paraplegics in the spinal injuries ward of her hospital. She continued to study the effects of cannabis in the 1990s, publishing several articles about cannabis-induced euphoria and the effects of cannabis on the brain.

== Personal life ==
Ames was married to editorial writer David Castle of the Cape Times and they had four sons. She was 47 years old when her husband died unexpectedly in 1967. After her husband's death, Ames's housekeeper Rosalina helped raise the family. Ames wrote about the experience in her memoir, Mothering in an Apartheid Society (2002).

== Death ==
Ames struggled with leukemia for some time. Before her death, she told an interviewer, "I shall go on until I drop." She continued to work for UCT as a part-time lecturer at Valkenberg Hospital until six weeks before she died at home in Rondebosch on 11 November 2002. Representing UCT's psychiatry department, Greg McCarthy gave the eulogy at the funeral. Ames was cremated, and according to her wishes, her ashes were combined with hemp seed and dispersed outside of Valkenberg Hospital where her memorial service was held.

== Legacy ==
External videos
- April 1996: Frances Ames talking about the poisoning of political activist Siphiwo Mtimkulu. (begins at 00:01:18)

South African neurosurgeon Colin Froman referred to Ames as the "great and unorthodox protagonist for the medical use of marijuana many years before the current interest in its use as a therapeutic drug". J. P. van Niekerk of the South African Medical Journal notes that "Frances Ames led by conviction and example" and history eventually justified her action in the Biko affair.

Ames's work on the Biko affair led to major medical reforms in South Africa, including the disbanding and replacement of the old apartheid-era medical organisations which failed to uphold the medical standards of the profession. According to van Niekerk, "the most enduring lesson for South African medicine was the clarification of the roles of medical practitioners when there is a question of dual responsibilities. This is now embodied inter alia in the SAMA Code of Conduct and in legal interpretations of doctors' responsibilities".

Ames testified during the medical hearings at the Truth and Reconciliation Commission in 1997. Archbishop Desmond Tutu honored Ames as "one of the handful of doctors who stood up to the apartheid regime and brought to book those doctors who had colluded with human rights abuse." In acknowledgement of her work on behalf of human rights in South Africa, Nelson Mandela awarded Ames the Order of the Star of South Africa in 1999, the highest civilian award in the country.

== Selected publications ==
- Mothering in an Apartheid Society (2002)
