= The Astronomer's Telegram =

Internet-based publication service for astronomical observations

- Website type: science
- Editor: Robert E. Rutledge
- Website: http://www.astronomerstelegram.org

The Astronomer's Telegram (ATel) is an internet-based short-notice publication service for quickly disseminating information on new astronomical observations. Examples include gamma-ray bursts, gravitational microlensing, supernovae, novae, or X-ray transients, but there are no restrictions on content matter. Telegrams are available instantly on the service's website, and distributed to subscribers via email digest within 24 hours.

The Astronomer's Telegram was launched on 17 December 1997 by Robert E. Rutledge with the goal of rapidly (<1 s) sharing information of interest to astronomers. Telegrams are sent out daily by email, but especially time sensitive events can be transmitted instantly. Since 2013, information is also broadcast over Twitter and Facebook.

To publish, astronomers request credentials. Credentials are issued to professional astronomers and graduate students, after verification by personal contact. Once credentials have been supplied and telegrams authorized, astronomers can publish telegrams directly, with no further editing.

As of August 2019, over 13000 telegrams have been published.

== History ==
While working at Max Planck Institute for Extraterrestrische Physik in Garching, Bob Rutledge began the site after his experience in using the web in 1995-6 as an aid in the discovery and characterization (by multiple scientists working informally and collaboratively) of the Bursting Pulsar, GRO J1744-28. Operations began in earnest at the department of astronomy of UC Berkeley where Rutledge was a visiting post-doctoral scholar with Prof. Lars Bildsten.

The service received international attention following a March 20, 2018 when Peter Dunsby submitted a report of a "very bright optical transient near the Trifid and Lagoon Nebulae". Forty minutes later he posted again apologizing, saying that the object in question was "identified as Mars". The Astronomer's Telegram editors presented Dunsby with a tongue-in-cheek award as discoverer of Mars.

Dunsby later described the incident to Newsweek as "an honest mistake arising from simply not checking what else was in my camera frame, during an automated astrophotography session and of very little consequence in the scheme of things. The world needs to smile more, so that’s something good that has come out of this episode.”

== Current operations ==
The Astronomer's Telegram currently has an editor in chief, an editor and a co-editor. The ATel service is free, both for publishers and readers of the telegrams. The Astronomer's Telegram's editors remind users to report discoveries of supernovae or comets to the Central Bureau for Astronomical Telegrams as well.

== See also ==
- Central Bureau for Astronomical Telegrams
