= Zigoni =

Zigoni is a surname. Notable people with the surname include:

- Gianfranco Zigoni (born 1944), Italian footballer, father of Gianmarco
- Gianmarco Zigoni (born 1991), Italian footballer

== See also ==
- Zingoni
