= Alison Lewis =

Chemical engineer and dean, University of Cape Town South Africa

Alison Lewis is a South African chemical engineer known for her research in crystallisation and precipitation as applied to the recovery of valuable metals. She is Dean of the Faculty of Engineering and the Built Environment at the University of Cape Town (UCT) and is a member of UCT’s Senior Leadership Team. Lewis is also the founder and director of UCT’s Crystallisation and Precipitation Research Unit.

== Early life and education ==
Lewis attended school at Pinetown Convent School in KwaZulu Natal and then St Mary’s Anglican School for Girls in Johannesburg. She earned a PhD in civil engineering from the University of Cape Town in 1993 after obtaining a BSc and MSc in chemical engineering at the same institution.

Under her maiden name, Billing, Lewis served on the UCT Students Representative Council from 1983 to 1985. An anti-apartheid activist she was detained without trial in 1986 under the Section 3.1 of the 1986 State of Emergency legislation From 1988 to 1990 as Alison Ozinsky, she was a member of the Cape Democrats in the United Democratic Front and served as the editor for the organisation's journal, Upfront.

== Academic career ==
Lewis began her academic career as a senior lecturer in UCT’s department of chemical engineering in 1995, becoming an associate professor in 2002. She became a full professor in the same department in 2007 and served as head of department from January 2013 until June 2015 when she was appointed dean of the faculty of engineering & the built environment. She is the first woman to have held this deanship at UCT.

The National Research Foundation has rated Lewis as Researchers who enjoy considerable international recognition by their peers for the high quality and impact of their recent research outputs since 2009.

== Awards and honours ==
- Received the NRF President’s Champion of Research Capacity Development at South African Higher Education Institutions Award in 2010.
- Received the Distinguished Woman Scientist Award from the Department of Science and Technology at the South African Women in Science Awards for Research and Innovation in 2012 and 2015 .
- She received the Africa Water Leadership Award: conferred on "outstanding professionals who have the vision, flair, acumen and professionalism to demonstrate excellent Leadership and Management skills in an organisation, making changes and achieving results” in 2016.
- She received the Engineering Research Capacity Development Award from the National Science and Technology Forum (NSTF) in 2021.
- Fellow of the Institution of Chemical Engineers (FIChemE), the South African Institute of Chemical Engineers (FSAIChE) and the South African Academy of Engineering (FSAAE).
- Elected as an International Member of the National Academy of Engineering, USA in 2024.

== Selected works ==
- Lewis, Alison; Chivavava, Jemitias; du Plessis, Jacolien; Smith, Dane; Smith, Jody-Lee (2021), "Innovative Reactors for Recovery of Rare Earth Elements (REEs)", in Azimi, Gisele; Ouchi, Takanari; Forsberg, Kerstin; Kim, Hojong (eds.), Rare Metal Technology 2021, The Minerals, Metals & Materials, Cham: Springer International Publishing, pp. 129–138, doi:10.1007/978-3-030-65489-4_14, ISBN 978-3-030-65488-7, S2CID 234315254
- Lewis, Alison (2015). Industrial crystallization : fundamentals and applications. Marcelo Seckler, Herman J. M. Kramer, Gerda van Rosmalen. Cambridge. ISBN 978-1-107-28042-7. OCLC 913568560.
- Lewis, Alison (2017), "Precipitation of Heavy Metals", in Rene, Eldon R.; Sahinkaya, Erkan; Lewis, Alison; Lens, Piet N.L. (eds.), Sustainable Heavy Metal Remediation, Environmental Chemistry for a Sustainable World, vol. 8, Cham: Springer International Publishing, pp. 101–120, doi:10.1007/978-3-319-58622-9_4, ISBN 978-3-319-58621-2
- Andreassen, Jens-Petter; Lewis, Alison Emslie (2017), "Classical and Nonclassical Theories of Crystal Growth", in Van Driessche, Alexander E.S.; Kellermeier, Matthias; Benning, Liane G.; Gebauer, Denis (eds.), New Perspectives on Mineral Nucleation and Growth, Cham: Springer International Publishing, pp. 137–154, doi:10.1007/978-3-319-45669-0_7, ISBN 978-3-319-45667-6
- Randall, D. G.; Nathoo, J.; Lewis, A. E. (2011-01-31). "A case study for treating a reverse osmosis brine using Eutectic Freeze Crystallization—Approaching a zero waste process". Desalination. 266 (1): 256–262. Bibcode:2011Desal.266..256R. doi:10.1016/j.desal.2010.08.034. ISSN 0011-9164.
- Lewis, Alison (2015). Industrial crystallization : fundamentals and applications. Marcelo Seckler, Herman J. M. Kramer, Gerda van Rosmalen. Cambridge. ISBN 978-1-107-28042-7. OCLC 913568560.
- Lewis, Alison Emslie (2010-09-01). "Review of metal sulphide precipitation". Hydrometallurgy. 104 (2): 222–234. Bibcode:2010HydMe.104..222L. doi:10.1016/j.hydromet.2010.06.010. ISSN 0304-386X.
