= Patricia Whitelock =

South African astrophysicist

Hon.Prof. Patricia Ann Whitelock BSc PhD MASSAf FRSSAf HFRAS HMSAIP FSAIP FTWAS
- Scientific career
- Fields: Astronomy
- Institutions: University of Cape Town

Professor Patricia Ann Whitelock (born 22 February 1951) is a British-born astrophysicist with dual British-South African nationality. She is a Fellow of the Royal Society of South Africa (of which she was vice-president in 2002); a member of the Academy of Science of South Africa; and a member of the South African Institute of Physics (SAIP), (of which she was president in 2001–2003).

She was acting director of the South African Astronomical Observatory from June 2002 to November 2003 and was the director in 2012. Her research is focused on our understanding of the late stages of stellar evolution and mass-loss of evolved stars, the structure of the Milky Way galaxy, and the stellar content of the local group galaxies. Whitelock has been published in 148 peer-reviewed scholarly articles with 36 being as first author, which has been cited in 2883 other publications.

She has been influential in maintaining the position of South Africa as a centre of astronomical excellence. She helped to establish the National Astrophysics and Space Science Program where she served as the first chair of its steering committee between 2002 and 2013. She was also one of the key drivers behind the successful bid by South Africa to host the International Office of Astronomy for Development of the IAU. An important part of her activity has been raising the profile of astronomy amongst the wider African education community. In 2018, she was awarded the De Beers Gold Medal by the SAIP, for "her outstanding research career in astronomy and astrophysics, and for her distinguished and extensive contributions to leadership, education and human capacity development of the Physics and Astronomy community"

== Education and early life ==
Patricia Whitelock was born in Tynemouth, UK, to Marie (née Galloway) and Philip Whitelock.

Fascinated by the night skies even as a child, she was encouraged to pursue a career in Astronomy in a correspondence with famous British populariser of astronomy Patrick Moore. She attended Sherrardswood School where her aptitude for the quantitative sciences was spotted and nurtured by her physics teacher, Tony Rook. After gaining a 1st Class degree in astronomy from University College, London in 1972, she completed a PhD, Ground-based infrared photometry of some astronomical sources, at Imperial College, London in 1976.

After her marriage in 1977 to fellow astronomer John Menzies, they moved to Cape Town to take up posts together at the SAAO, where they continue to work.
