= Ranjana Kumari =

Indian social activist, writer and academic

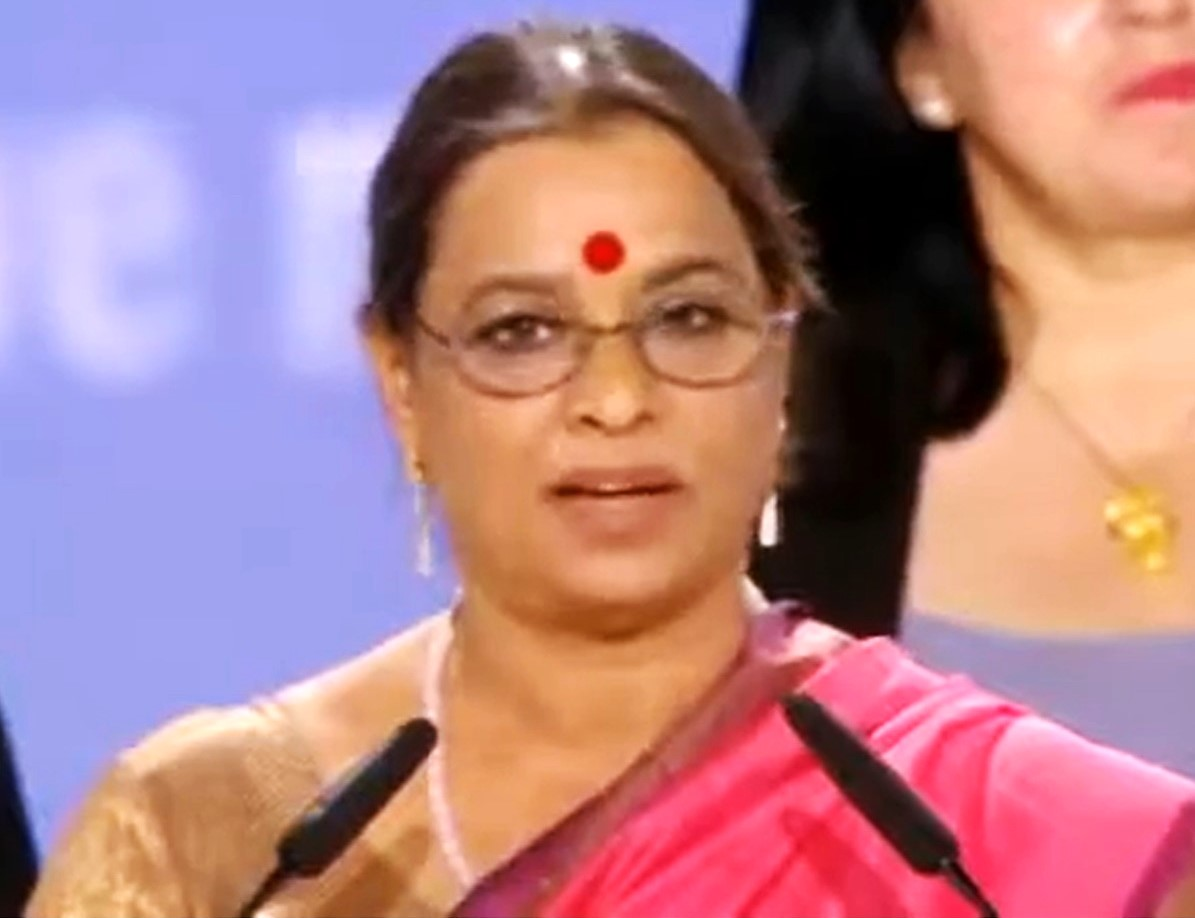
- Kumari speaks at the Paris Iran Freedom Rally in 2015
- Born: Varanasi, Uttar Pradesh, India
- Education: Banaras Hindu University; Jawaharlal Nehru University (M.A., M.Phil., Ph.D. in Political Science)
- Occupations: Academic, activist
- Known for: Women's rights

Ranjana Kumari is an Indian social activist, writer, and academic. She is the director of the Centre for Social Research in Delhi and chairwoman of Women Power Connect, a national organization of women's groups.

== Early life and education ==
Kumari was raised in Varanasi, Uttar Pradesh, in the Kashi Vidyapeeth compound. She was born to her mother Chandravati Sharma and father Jayanath, who manufactured banarasi saris. She is the second of their six children and their eldest daughter. Her grandfather Pandit Vishwanath Sharma was a founder of Kashi Vidyapeeth, and she has described her family as "very Gandhian". Most of her childhood friends became married, often through arrangements by their parents, by the time their 12th year of school was completed.

After she completed her primary education at Central Hindu Girls School, she resisted pressure from her grandmother and other family members to attend a women's college and instead enrolled in Banaras Hindu University (BHU). She studied political science, psychology, and economics at BHU and graduated in 1974, then moved to Delhi and completed her post-graduate and doctorate degrees in political science at Jawaharlal Nehru University. Her PhD thesis studied power structures of the Panchayati raj political system, with a focus on the role of women.

== Career ==
What is your idea of an empowered woman?

A woman who is strong, confident, fearless because if you’re not fearless, you will be wronged. You have to be strong. You have to say no if anything happens, maybe sometimes you have to pay a cost for saying no but don’t accept any injustice ever in life. Say no, be ready to bear the cost but don’t accept any injustice.

— Rajana Kumari (2015)

After completing her masters in Political Science in 1976, Kumari worked as a lecturer at Delhi University for four years, following the death of her father. During this time, she joined a protest with activist Pramila Dandavate against a dowry death, and then began conducting research into dowry deaths.

In 1983, she founded a nonprofit NGO based in Delhi, the Centre for Social Research, to focus on the empowerment of marginalized people. She became a prominent women's rights activist in India, and has spoken on a variety of issues, including dowry deaths, the reports of a 2014 gang rape and murder of two girls in Uttar Pradesh, the impact of the COVID-19 pandemic on women in India, victim shaming, and the prevalence of sexual violence.

After leading a campaign in support of the Women's Reservation Bill, she released the book Reign She Will: Women's Strife for Political Space in 2011, in which she examined factors that contribute to a lack of participation by Indian women in politics. In 2013, she began to study surrogacy in India, and submitted recommendations to the government in 2014 to create legal protections; in 2021, she stated, "We never wanted the ban, but we wanted the total protection of the women who are offering the womb for a child. Banning never works. It hasn't worked for drugs or alcohol. How will it work for something which is so human?"

In February 2013, she participated in the One Billion Rising campaign, telling The Washington Post "something changed forever" after the 2012 gang rape and murder of Nirbhaya, and "Women here are no longer using the language of protecting themselves. Today women are saying, 'What is the society doing to ensure our safety?'" In August 2013, after reports of a gang rape in Mumbai, she called for protests to demand the arrests of the suspects, stating "Nobody is safe today because people are getting away with impunity." In 2017, after reports of crime against women in India had increased, she criticized the effectiveness of the government response, discussed the link between safety and economic development, and offered suggestions for how to improve the government response, including police training, the use of social media, and reforming the judicial process to become more empathetic towards women victims, also stating "Women are now mustering the courage. But as long as women remain dependent on men for their jobs, future and income they remain silent - which is not out of choice but circumstances." In 2018, she discussed the #metoo movement in India with Indian Currents, stating it is "the first time that a collective call by women has been made and women are breaking their silence to talk in public about it" and predicting it would become "a big movement" in India.

== Selected works ==
- Kumari, Ranjana (1989). Brides are not for burning: Dowry victims in India. New Delhi. ISBN 81-7027-119-3. OCLC 20130407.
- Kumari, Ranjana (1989). Women-headed households in rural India. New Delhi: Radiant Publishers. OCLC 765798041.
- Dandavate, Pramila; Kumari, Ranjana; Verghese, Jamila (1989). Widows, Abandoned and Destitute Women in India. New Delhi: Radiant Publishers. ISBN 9788170271390.
- Kumari, Ranjana (1990). Growing up in Rural India: Problems and Needs of Adolescent Girls. New Delhi: Radiant Publishers. ISBN 978-8170271307.
- Kumari, Ranjana (1994). Women parliamentarians: a study in the Indian context. Har-Anand Publ. OCLC 914955146.
- Kumari, Ranjana (1998). Gender, work, and power relations: a case study of Haryana. Har-Anand Publications. ISBN 81-241-0419-0. OCLC 38528193.
- Kumari, Ranjana (2011). Reign she will: Women's strife for political space. Har-Anand Publications. ISBN 978-81-241-1557-2. OCLC 800743623.

== Critical reception ==
In a review of Brides are not for Burning: Dowry Victims in India, Maitrayee Chaudhuri writes for Sociological Bulletin, "contrary to a widely held assumption of the emancipatory role of education, the study suggests that neither education, nor employment seemed to empower women to resist harassment" and "[i]t is a pity" the study did not include "a conceptual frame to explain dowry and its relationship with property rights and other issues" because "[a] clear understanding of dowry is a necessary prelude to any ameliorative action."

In a review of Women-Headed Households in Rural India and Growing up in Rural India: Problems and Needs of Adolescent Girls, Anantha Giri writes for Sociological Bulletin that Kumari and her associates conducted studies with a focus on northern India and policy proposals to support women identified as disadvantaged by what is described as the "feminization of poverty", and "[i]t is unfortunate that Indian sociologists have not adequately responded to the contemporary challenge of marrying numbers to representations. One wishes for more actual voices even in such quick reportage and statistical profiles, more on how the problems are culturally constructed even in such inquiries which are primarily geared towards policy formulation and policy intervention rather than just scholastic illumination." Eddie J. Girdner writes in a review of Growing up in Rural India: Problems and Needs of Adolescent Girls for Pacific Affairs, "This well-written and interesting study of the tragic situation facing young women in India is a timely and valuable contribution to the growing body of literature on women in the third world."

In a review of Brides are not for Burning and Women-headed Households in Rural India by Kumari, and Widows, Abandoned and Destitute Women in India by Pramila Dandavate, Kumari, and Jamila Verghese, Ursula Sharma writes for Sociology that the two research reports by Kumari "[prefer] practical suggestions to polemic, and [conclude] with some sensible suggestions addressed to policy makers" and "I liked Ranjana Kumari's resourceful approach to solving methodological problems and her direct and down-to-earth style." With regard to Widows, Abandoned and Destitute Women in India, Sharma writes the book "is a collection of papers arising from a workshop sponsored by the Makhila Dakshata Samiti, a voluntary women's organization in Delhi, which focused on the women who constitute 'the rejects' of Indian society." After discussing the "journalistic" tone of Widows, Sharma writes that all of the works "very clearly" show "Indian women who cannot find support and contentment within the household receive minimal support outside of it. There is a real need to develop institutions and networks from which such women can derive support and assistance to build independent and worthwhile lives."

== Personal life ==
In 1977, she married Sudhindra Bhadoria, a politician with the Bahujan Samaj Party, after The Emergency.
