= St Mary's School, Waverley =

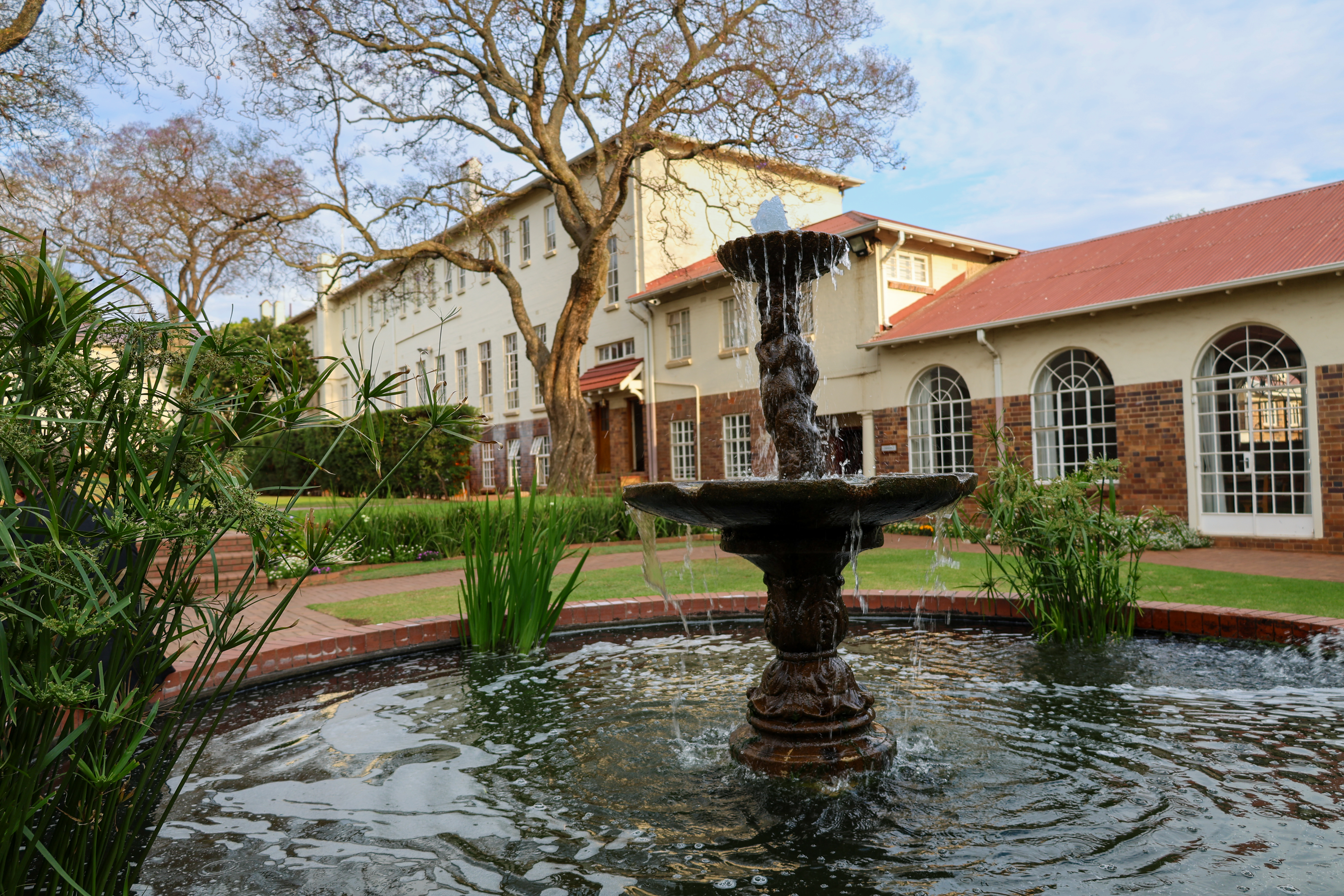

Location
- 55 Athol Street, Waverley; Johannesburg, Gauteng 2090; South Africa; 26°08′29″S 28°04′41″E

Information
- Type: Private & Boarding
- Motto: Latin: Candida Rectaque (Honest and upright)
- Religious affiliation: Anglican
- Established: 1888; 138 years ago
- Locale: Suburban
- Sister school: St John's College, Johannesburg
- Headmistress: Deanne King
- Exam board: IEB
- Grades: 000–12
- Gender: Female
- Age: 3 to 18
- Enrollment: 1,057 girls
- Language: English
- Schedule: 07:30 – 14:15
- Campus: Urban Campus
- Houses: Clayton; Furse; Karney; Phelps
- Colours: Blue, red, white
- Rivals: Jeppe High School for Girls; St. Andrew's School for Girls; St Mary's DSG, Pretoria
- Alumni: Old Girls
- School fees: R 232,600 p.a. (boarding termly); R 112 450 p.a. (tuition Form V)
- Website: www.stmaryschool.co.za

St Mary's School, Waverly is a private English medium, Anglican and boarding school for girls. It is situated in the suburb of Waverley in Johannesburg in the Gauteng province of South Africa, it is one of the top and most academic schools in Gauteng.

Established in 1888, it is the oldest school in Johannesburg. It was founded by the Anglican clergyman the Rev. John T. Darragh, who also founded its brother school St John's College, Johannesburg in Houghton ten years later in 1898.

St Mary's School writes the Independent Examinations Board exams.

As of December 2023, the headmistress at St Mary's was Deanne King. In January 2025, the school introduced a no-cellphone policy during school hours.

== Alumnae and Old Girls ==
- Cindy Brown (hockey)
- Lisa-Marie Deetlefs (hockey)
- Lilian du Plessis (hockey)
- Natalie Grainger (squash)
- Claire Nitch (squash)
- Lize-Mari Retief (swimming)
- Ashley Callie
- Prue Leith
- Lerato Mbele
- Mogau Motlhatswi
- Carolyn Slaughter
- Jane Dutton
- Helen Zille
- Alison Lewis
- Shelley Russell
- Hannah Pearce

== See also ==
- List of boarding schools
