= Azila Talit Reisenberger =

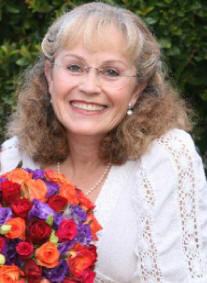
Talit Reisenberger

Dr. Azila Talit Reisenberger is Le Professeur Distinqué; and an author, the Head of the Hebrew Department at the University of Cape Town, South Africa, a champion of Women's Rights and Gender Equality, and an acting Rabba.

== Biography ==
Dr. Azila Talit Reisenberger was born in Tel Aviv, Israel. Around the age of 24 she went to South Africa on her honeymoon with her husband Peter, they both settled and currently live in Cape Town. She did her first degree (B.A.) at the University of Cape Town where she concentrated on two areas of research: the study of world religions and Hebrew literature. The thesis of her second degree (M.A) was: “The Literary Creations of Hannah Szenes”. The theme of Dr. Talit Reisenberger's doctorate – “The Concept of Motherhood in the Bible” – has proved that fixed prejudices and the expectations in daily life in ancient times influenced the definition of “The Motherhood Concept” as it appears in the text of the Bible. As if in a cyclical knock on effect – the descriptions in the Bible have influenced the building of prejudice about the way motherhood is perceived as well as affecting what was expected of women, for thousands of years, in the world outside the Bible.

Her mother tongue is Hebrew, but Dr. Azila Talit Reisenberger lives in a country where the most common language of academia and literature is English. As a result, Dr. Talit Reisenberger is building a bridge between these languages through her writing, lectures, translation of Hebrew literature written in South Africa to local languages, encouraging writing in Xhosa and Zulu. This has led to her being classified as a leading author of Minority Literature in South Africa and she has become an authority in this subject.

Dr. Talit Reisenberger has written academic publications, including "Validation through Hebrew Literature" (Journal of Language Teaching), "Suture, the Seam between Literatures" (Journal for the Study of Religion), "The Development of Halachah and Jewish Women" (Journal for the Study of Religion) and "Biblical Women: Non-Existent Entity" (Journal for Constructive Theology). Her work is published in many distinguished journals for example Women in Judaism. She edits books, and both organises and lectures at universities and conferences throughout the world. In 2005 Dr. Talit Reisenberger was elected to serve as president of the International Minority Literature and Cultures Association (IMLACA), which promotes Minority Literature around the world.

Dr. Talit Reisenberger's main goal and recurring focus, despite scarce resources and difficult conditions in a world which is becoming a small global village, mainly using the English language, is to guard the “Minority Voice”, as she acts as an advocate in the protection of the ‘marginal voice’. She is known in South Africa as a leader in the movement to protect and develop Women's Rights and Gender Equality and she is a founding member in the lobby group Women Demand Dignity (WDD).

Dr. Talit Reisenberger has been praised for her work as one of the leaders of the different religions in Cape Town who established a multi faith religious group which encourages understanding between the various genders, religions and races. This movement's aim is to defeat prejudice and hatred all over South Africa. Furthermore, Dr. Talit Reisenberger has served since 1989 as an acting Rabbi of Temple Hillel, a Jewish Progressive Synagogue in East London, South Africa.

=== Controversy ===
In March 2015 she was involved in an altercation with a group of black UCT students over their demands for the immediate removal of a statue of the white colonialist Cecil John Rhodes from the campus grounds. She voiced her dissatisfaction with the way the black students behaved in an attempt to have their demands met: “For all they know, I can fully agree with their demands or I may not,” Reisenberger told the Cape Argus. “The only thing that I have an issue with is that these students must remember that they are among a select few youngsters in this country that attend a university. Instead of throwing a tantrum they should be discussing the matter in a proper dialogue.”

=== Writing ===
In addition to her academic publications Talit Reisenberger has published poetry books:

=== Poetry Books ===
1. Nekuda Umabat (in Hebrew),
2. Kisses through a Veil (in English),
3. Mahazor Ahava (in Hebrew),
4. Life in Translation (in English)
5. Silver Highlights (in English)

=== Short stories ===
1. Mipo ad Kap Ha’Tikva Ha’Tova Trans. from here to the Cape of Good Hope.

Two of the short stories included in her anthology of short stories Mipo ad Kap Ha’Tikva Ha’Tova (from here to the Cape of Good Hope) in Hebrew, have gained awards from the Author's Association of South Africa. Two of her plays Adam's Apple (1991) and The Loving Father (1996), were performed at the Grahamstown National Arts Festival. Due to her unique name a number of her books have been published under the name Azila, while others have been published under her full name, Azila Talit Reisenberger.

=== Novels ===
1. The Other Booker Prize
2. The Magic of Us

== Selected publications ==
Academic publications

- Reisenberger, Azila “A Jewish Perspective” in Ancient Tales for Modern Times: reflections on Abraham and his children. Van der Merwe, Chris N. Lux Verbi (Eds): Cape Town. 2009. 181–185. ISBN 978-0-7963-0789-7
- Reisenberger, Azila “Validation through Hebrew Literature“, in Journal for Language Teaching Vol 41 (2). December 2007. 112–122. ISSN 0259-9570
- Reisenberger, Azila “Suture, the Seam between Literatures” in Journal for the Study of Religion Vol 19 (2). 125–137. ISSN 1011-7601
- Reisenberger, Azila “The Development of Halachah and Jewish Women” in Journal for the Study of Religion Vol 18 (2). 75–87. ISSN 1011-7601
- Reisenberger, Azila “The Sabbath Trap and other Pitfalls in Xhosa Translations of the Bible” in Journal for the Study of Religion Vol 12 (1–2), Dec. 2000. SA. 120–127.
- Reisenberger, Azila “Biblical Women: Non-Existent Entity” in Journal for Constructive Theology, 6 (2), Dec. 2000. SA. 57–68.

As Editor

- Reisenberger, Azila (Ed) “Echoes of Religion in Minority Literatures” in Journal for the Study of Religion Vol 19 (2). ISSN 1011-7601
- Reisenberger, Azila (Ed) (2005) Pride in Tradition through Acceptance – Jewish Identity in SA as reflected in Lison’s Stories. Green Sea Publishers, Cape Town. ISBN 0-620-33944-6.
- Reisenberger, Azila (Ed)(2002) Women’s Spirituality in the Transformation of South Africa. Waxmann Munster: New York/Munchen/Berlin.

Poetry publications

- Reisenberger, Azila (2012) Silver Highlights. Snail Press, Cape Town. ISBN 978-1-874923-83-1.
- Reisenberger, Azila (2008) Life in Translation. Modjaji, Cape Town. ISBN 978-0-9802729-1-8.
- Reisenberger, Azila (2002) Mahzor A’hava. Gevanim, Tel Aviv. ISBN 965-411-455-0
- Reisenberger, Azila (1994) Kisses Through a Veil. Green Sea Publishers, Cape Town. ISBN 0-620-18698-4.
- Reisenberger, Azila (1986) Nekuda U'mabat. Eked, Tel Aviv
- Reisenberger, Azila “The first heart transplant” in Carapace Vol 73. 2008. 13.
- Reisenberger, Azila "Four daughters” in Jewish Affairs Vol 63(1). 2008. 50. ISSN 0021-6313
- Reisenberger, Azila “A Teacher Woman” in New Contrast Vol. 35 (4). Editor HA Hodge. 20–21. ISSN 1017-5415.
- Reisenberger, Azila “Mot Ha’zamir” in Pseifas (Journal for Poetry), Israel. Vol 65. Editor Itamar Yaos-Kest. 39.

Short Stories

- Reisenberger, Azila (2004) Mipo ad Kap Ha’Tikva Ha’Tova (From Here to the Cape of Good Hope.) Gevanim, Tel Aviv. ISBN 965-411-678-2
