= Abimbola Windapo =

Nigerian professor

Abimbola Windapo is a Nigerian professor of construction management at the University of Cape Town. She is the first female professor of Construction Management in Nigeria and South Africa.

== Biography ==
Windapo graduated from the University of Ife in 1987 with a degree in building and went on to the University of Lagos where she got a master's degree in construction management. She worked for Bouygues Nigeria as a studies and planning engineer. She moved to Lagos State Polytechnic in 1996 and the University of Lagos in 1998. While at the University of Lagos, she completed her PhD in building in 2005. She was appointed at the University of Cape Town in 2009 and was promoted as a full professor in 2020.

She became a fellow of the Nigerian institute of building in 2007.

She received the 2020 South32 Award in the Engineering Research Capacity Development category presented by the National Science and Technology Forum.
