= Salome Maswime =

South African clinician and health expert

Salome Tumishang Maswime
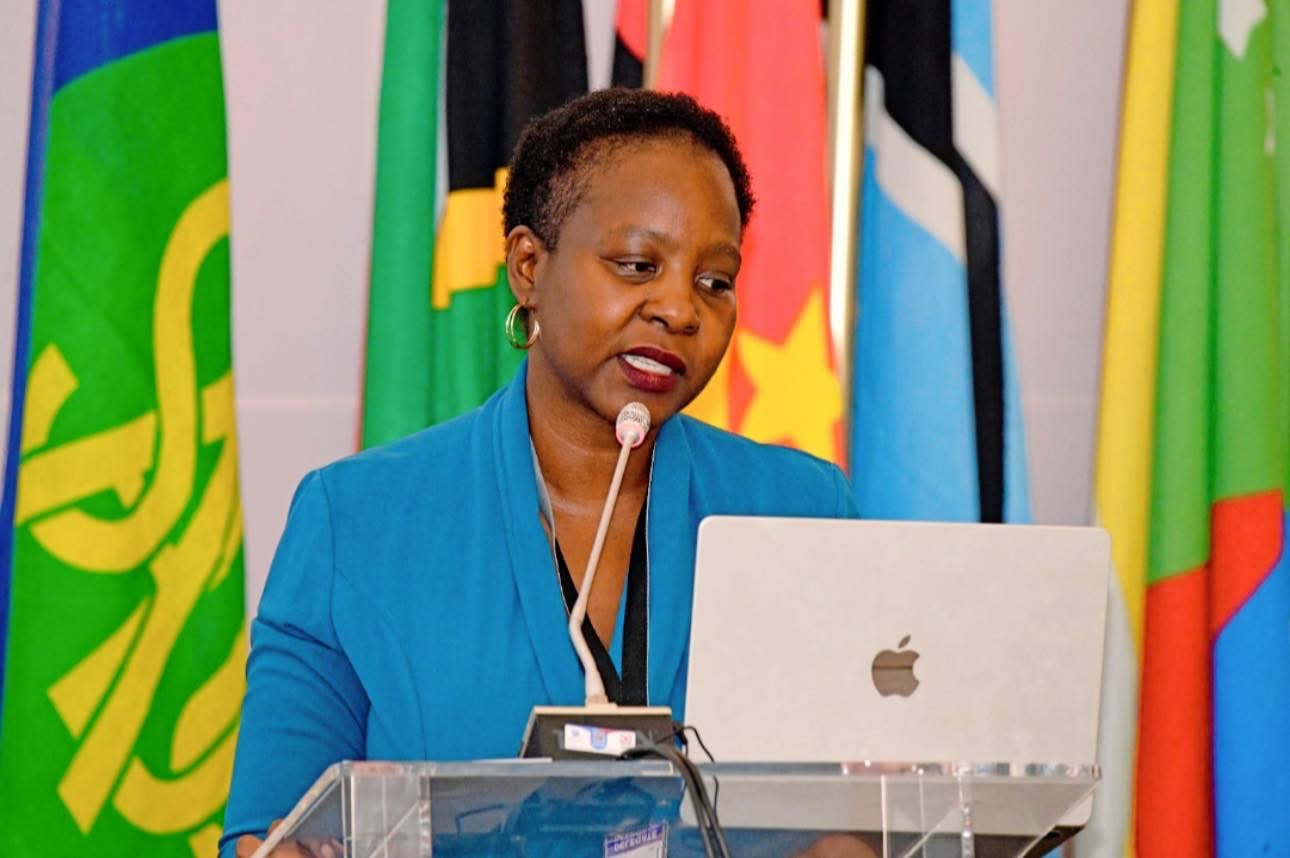
- Maswime in 2026
- Education: University of KwaZulu-Natal; University of the Witwatersrand
- Scientific career
- Workplaces: University of Cape Town; University of the Witwatersrand; Chris Hani Baragwanath Hospital
- Thesis: Reducing maternal morbidity and mortality from caesarean section-related haemorrhage in Southern Gauteng

Salome Maswime is the Head of School of Clinical Medicine at the University of the Witwatersrand. She is a clinician-scientist, a global health expert, and a pioneer in academic global surgery. She is an obstetrician and gynaecologist and the inaugural Head of Global Surgery at the University of Cape Town. She advocates for women's health rights, equity in surgical and maternal care, and providing adequate health services to remote and underserved populations. She advises and consults for many institutions, including the World Health Organization. In 2017, she was honored with the Trailblazer and Young Achiever Award. She is a member of the Academy of Science of South Africa. She is the former head of the World Health Organization Collaborating Centre on Integrated Clinical Care. She serves as the vice-chairperson of the Health Professions Council of South Medical and Dental Professions Board and a council member. Her qualifications include, an MBChB at UKZN, FCOG(SA), MMED and PhD in Obstetrics and Gynaecology at Wits University, and a postdoctoral fellowship at Harvard Medical School and Massachusetts General Hospital. She has a Certificate in Higher Education Teaching from Harvard University, and a Certificate in Leading Organizations and Change from Massachusetts Institute of Technology. Salome has worked in several hospitals in South Africa as a medical doctor and specialist.

== Early life and education ==
Salome Maswime is from Limpopo. Her father was a theology professor at the University of Venda. She graduated in medicine from the University of KwaZulu-Natal in 2005. During her medical internship, she saw two mothers die in a maternity ward in Greytown, KwaZulu-Natal. This experience inspired her to train as a specialist obstetrician and gynecologist, as she feared she would "remain part of the problem that was leading to many preventable and unjust maternal deaths."

Maswime spent a decade at the University of the Witwatersrand in Johannesburg and at the Chris Hani Baragwanath Academic Hospital in Soweto. During this time, she realized she wanted to continue her formal education to understand the underlying causes of negative outcomes for mothers and neonates in childbirth.

She secured a PhD position supported by the Carnegie Corporation of New York and the South African Medical Research Council that allowed her to find ways to improve the lives of mothers and infants. She completed her Masters and PhD theses at the University of the Witwatersrand, where she looked to reduce maternal morbidity from caesarean section related haemorrhage across 15 hospitals in Gauteng.

Salome is married to Gundo Vhusani Maswime, and they have two children.

== Career ==
Maswime is an executive member of the South African Perioperative Research Group. She is a member of the International Network of Obstetric Survey Systems. She was a lecturer and Director of the University of the Witwatersrand Obstetrics and Gynaecology Clinical Research Division and an obstetrician at the Chris Hani Baragwanath Hospital Academic Hospital. She works with women with high risk pregnancies. Her research considers maternal near miss and mortality. She found that maternal deaths from bleeding during caesarean sections have increased in South Africa. She compared the preparedness of hospitals for surgical complications in caesarean sections in southern Gauteng.

Maswime discovered that Africa accounts for 200,000 maternal deaths per year; which is two thirds of all maternal deaths worldwide. In 2017, she was named by the Mail & Guardian as one of the Top 200 South Africans. She has written for The Conversation about increasing the number of caesarean sections in Africa. She won the Trailblazer and Young Achiever Award from Jacob Zuma in 2017.

In 2018, she launched the South African Clinician Scientists Society, a collegial group for emerging specialists and researchers returning from training abroad that facilitates mentorship, networking, and multidisciplinary research. She was awarded a Discovery Foundation Harvard University, Massachusetts General Hospital Fellowship in 2018. Her fellowship allows her to research the causes of stillbirths in HIV-positive people. The fellowship is worth R2.1 million. During her postdoctoral year, Maswime found herself one of only two people at meetings at the World Health Organization or UNICEF. She also worked on her approach to mental health as it relates to mothers and children.

In 2019 she was appointed as a Professor of Global Surgery at the University of Cape Town. In 2020, she was announced as one of the World Economic Forum's Class of 2020 Young Scientists, a group of 25 notable researchers who are "at the forefront of scientific discovery."

Salome is a member of the College of Obstetrics and Gynaecology Council in the College of Medicine South Africa. She is the Chairperson of the South African, and the SADC Safe Surgical Care Technical Experts Working Group, and a member of the United Nations Core Stillbirths Estimates Group. She is the past Chair of the Health Systems Trust Board and previously served as their Interim CEO. She is the Vice-Chair of the Lifebox Board. She is a Member of the Academy of Scientist and a Y-rated Scientist with the National Research Foundation. She received the International Healthcare Practitioner award from Zenith Global Health in the UK in 2025.

Since 2026, she has been the Head of School of Clinical Medicine at the University of the Witwatersrand.
