= Jo Noero =

South African architect

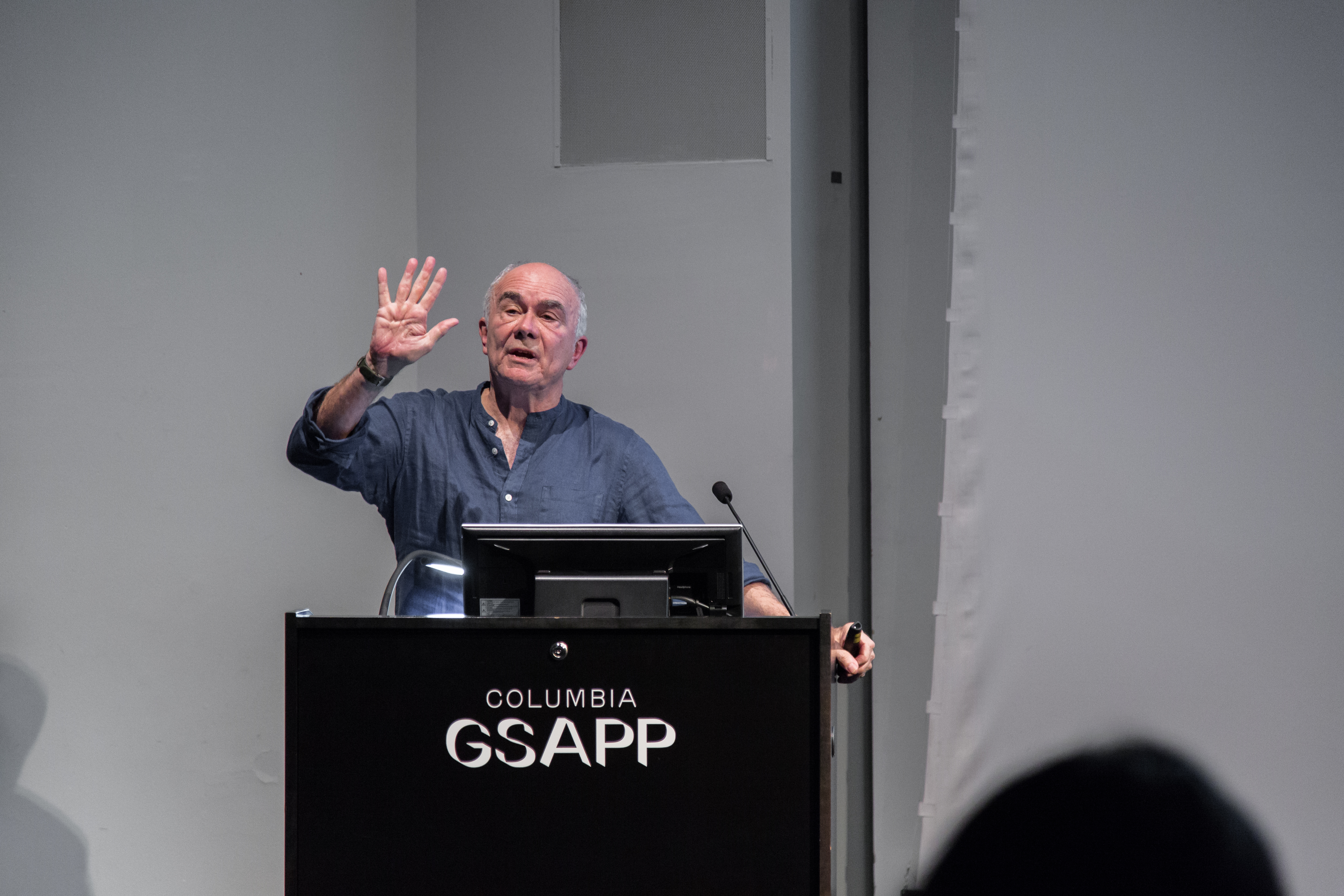
Image of Jo Noero

Jo Noero is a South African architect. Noero is an International Fellow of The Royal Institute of British Architects (RIBA) and an Honorary Fellow of the American Institute of Architects (AIA).

== Professional ==
Noero has completed over 200 buildings and is known for The Red Location Precinct in New Brighton, a township in Port Elizabeth. The Red Location Gallery was named the Best Building In the World at the 2013 Icon Awards in London, while The Red Location Museum won the Lubetkin Prize in 2006 for the Most Outstanding Building Outside the EU, as well as The Dedallo Minosse President's Award, The RIBA International Award, and a World Leadership Award for Public Architecture.

Noero’s architecture has been exhibited at The Museum of Modern Art (MoMA) in New York, the MAXXI National Museum of the 21st Century Arts in Rome, and the Museum of Architecture in Munich, as well as at Biennales in Venice, São Paulo, Singapore, Chicago and Istanbul.

Locally, the South African Institute of Architects awarded Noero the Gold Medal for Architecture in 2010, as well as three awards of Excellence, 15 Awards of Merit and 14 Project Awards. He is also one of three architects to have exhibited at the National Gallery of Art in Cape Town.

Noero made his name internationally during Apartheid, working for NGOs, Desmond Tutu and the Anglican Church on schools, community centres, churches and homes in the townships, most notably in Soweto.

With the coming of democracy, the scope of Noero’s work broadened to include offices, public buildings, schools and the homes of some of South Africa’s leading struggle heroes, business leaders and arts personalities.

== Academic ==
Noero was appointed a lecturer in the School Of Architecture at University of Witwatersrand in 1982. In 1995 he was appointed the Ruth and Norman Professor of Architecture and Director of Graduate Studies at the Sam Fox School of Design & Visual Arts at Washington University in St. Louis. Noero was appointed Director of the School of Architecture and Planning at the University of Cape Town (UCT) from 2000-2005. He held the position of Professor of Architecture at UCT from 2000- 2014 and became Emeritus Professor in 2015.

Noero has lectured in many countries around the world and his work has been extensively published in both journals and books internationally.

Noero was awarded the Alexander Petrie Prize for Outstanding Contribution to Arts and Culture by the University of Kwa-Zulu Natal in 1998, the Prize for Outstanding Creative Work by UCT in 2012, and an Honorary Doctorate of Science by the University of Brighton in UK in 1995.

== Projects ==
Jo Noero’s body of work includes residential, educational, cultural, and public buildings across South Africa, often noted for their social engagement, contextual sensitivity, and use of modest materials to achieve architectural impact.

- House Nxumalo, Alexandra
- Denis Goldberg House of Hope Museum, Hout Bay
- Christ Church, Somerset West
- Red Location Museum, New Brighton
- The West Coast Fossil Park Interpretive Centre, Langebaan
- St. Cyprian’s School for Girls, Oranjezicht
- The Table House
- Castle Rock Beach House, Cape Peninsula

== Awards ==
- 19th Sophia Gray Memorial Lecture Laureate (2007)

== Personal ==
Noero is married to Joy Sapieka Noero and has three children. Noero lives in Hout Bay Heights, Hout Bay, Cape Town, South Africa.
