= Jean Cleymans =

Belgian physicist (1944–2021)

Jean Cleymans (5 August 1944—22 February 2021) was a Belgian physicist and a professor at the University of Cape Town (UCT). He made notable contributions to the area of quark-gluon plasma physics with focus on statistical hadronization.

Jean Cleymans died in an accident in his hometown Turnhout on February 22, 2021.

== Education ==
Cleymans obtained his doctorate in physics in 1970 at the University of Louvain (UCLouvain) in Louvain-la-Neuve, Belgium and completed his post-doctoral training in 1977 with habilitation in theoretical and particle-manybody physics at Bielefeld University, Germany.

== Work ==
Cleymans' research addressed topics pursued by the ALICE Collaboration at the Large Hadron Collider of the CERN in Geneva, Switzerland. Together with professor Zeblon Vilakazi, he was instrumental in establishing the South Africa-CERN programme, the successor to the UCT-CERN Research Centre. He also contributed to the SA-Joint Institute for Nuclear Research with Russia and was Leader of the UCT-ALICE Collaboration at CERN.

Cleymans, a theoretical physicists, has co-authored 299 articles and conference papers with 8,639 citations (status March 3, 2021). In addition, he is listed on 100 LHC-ALICE experimental works which have earned more than 6,000 citations. He also edited a number of books, reports and conference proceedings. His articles have been published in a variety of international journals, among others the European Physical Journal, Physical Review and Physics Letters. Over the years he supervised 24 MSc and 17 PhD students.

Cleymans acted as referee for several journals and was listed as a distinguished EPJ referee in 2017. He was member of the editorial board of the MDPI journal Physics and he served as chairman of the South Africa-CERN Programme.

== Family ==
Cleymans was married to Ria (Maria) since 1968, they have two daughters Sylvie (1969-2021) and Silke (1980).

== Awards ==
- Elected Fellow of the Royal Society of South Africa (1993)
- Alexander von Humboldt Research Award (1999)
- Prize of the Polish Ministry of National Education for Research Excellence (2000)
- Prize of the Polish Ministry of National Education for Outstanding Team Research (2003)
