= Daniel Ncayiyana =

South African obstetrician and gynaecologist

- Born: Harding, Kwa-Zulu Natal
- Education: University of Groningen; New York University School of Medicine
- Known for: Editor of South African Medical Journal
- Scientific career
- Fields: Medicine
- Workplaces: University of Cape Town; University of Transkei

Daniel James Mandla Ncayiyana is a South African obstetrician and gynaecologist who was Editor-in-Chief of the South African Medical Journal for twenty years. He was born in a rural area of Harding near Port Shepstone, KwaZulu-Natal, South Africa, where he developed a fascination with trains. However, a doctor's visit to a local clinic sparked his interest in medicine, and he became determined to become a doctor himself.

Ncayiyana's first attempt to train as a doctor in the 1960s was cut short during his third year at the University of Natal Medical School in Durban due to his anti-apartheid activities. He went into exile in the Democratic Republic of the Congo, where he continued his studies and graduated as a licensed medical doctor in 1970 from the University of Groningen Medical School in the Netherlands. He then pursued postgraduate training in obstetrics and gynaecology at the New York University School of Medicine and practiced as a specialist obstetrician and gynaecologist in Seattle for 15 years.

Ncayiyana returned to South Africa in 1986 to work in the Transkei, where he pioneered the problem-based learning and community-oriented curriculum that has now been adopted by virtually all universities in South Africa to train health professionals. He was also instrumental in establishing the University of Transkei Medical School, now known as the Walter Sisulu Medical School, where he acted as Vice-Chancellor for three years.

In 1993, Ncayiyana was appointed Editor-in-Chief of the South African Medical Journal, becoming the first black editor and one of the most influential figures in the world of medicine and medical research in South Africa. He was responsible for selecting the articles to be published and wrote editorials that influenced medical thinking in the country for over 20 years.

Ncayiyana later became involved in higher education management and governance, co-authoring a book with Fred Hayward titled Effective Governance: A Guide for Council Members of Universities and Technikons, which has become a standard reference for universities in South Africa. He was also a founding Vice-Chancellor of the Durban University of Technology in 2001.

Ncayiyana is an Honorary Fellow of the Colleges of Medicine of South Africa and an Honorary Professor of Obstetrics and Gynaecology at the University of Cape Town. He has served as an independent consultant in medical education and training, working with universities in Malawi, Namibia, Nigeria, and The Gambia, among others, funded by international agencies such as the World Bank, United States Agency for International Development (USAID), and the Ford Foundation.

In addition to his achievements in medicine and education, Ncayiyana has an obsession with flight and aircraft, having trained as a private pilot and learned to fly single-engine planes. Through a series of fortuitous events, he was able to achieve his goal of becoming a doctor, despite the obstacles he faced due to apartheid and.
