= Walter Baets =

Belgian-born author and academic (born 1955)

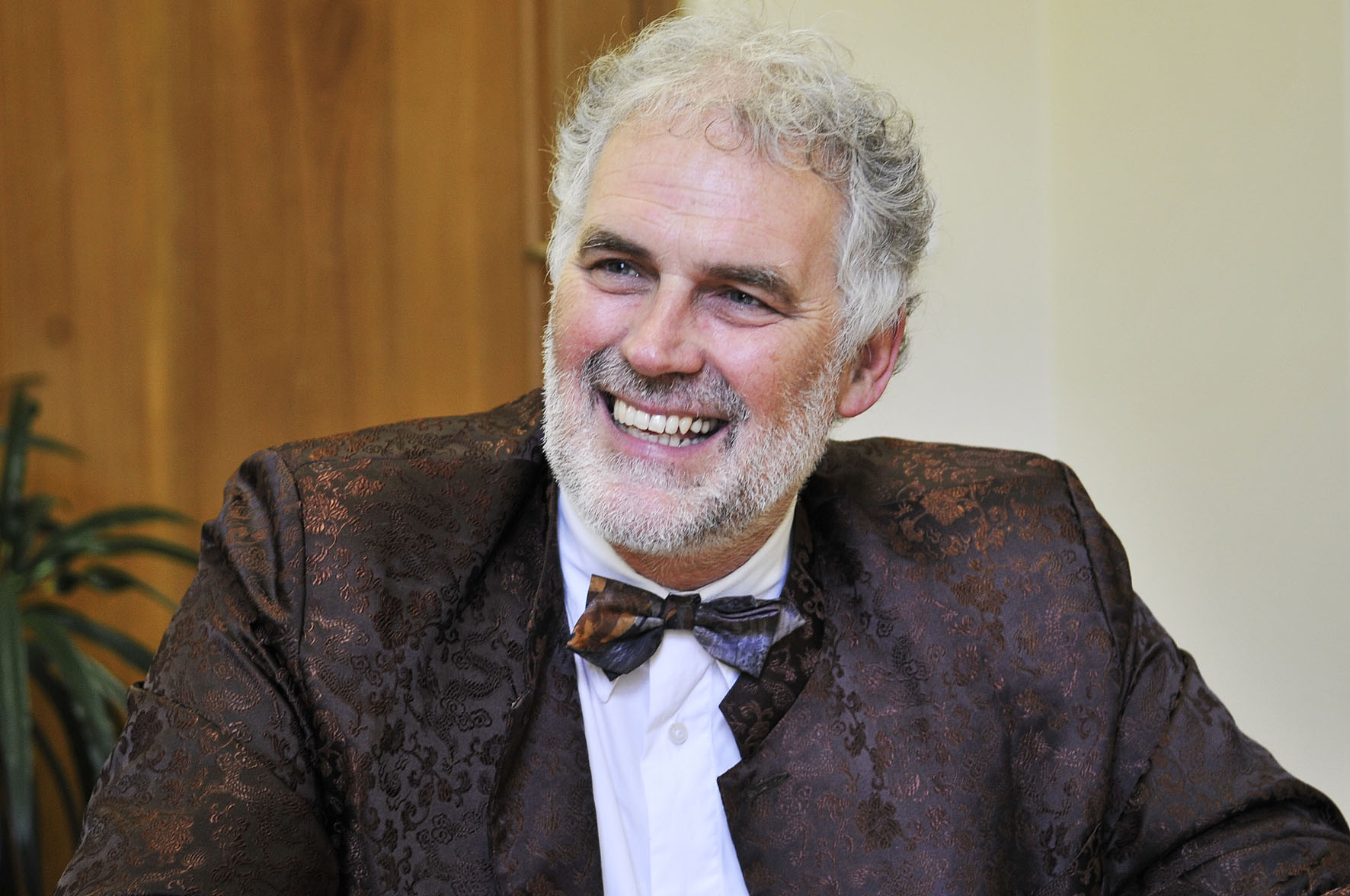
- Director of the UCT GSB, Walter Baets.

Walter R.J. Baets (born 1955) is a Belgian-born author and academic. and the previous director of the University of Cape Town Graduate School of Business (UCT GSB). Where he was the Chair of the Association of African Business Schools as well as the Allan Gray Centre for Values-Based Leadership at the UCT GSB. In 2015, the UCT GSB was crowned the top business school on the continent for the eighth year running.

He is a former UNESCO Chair in Education for Social and Sustainable Entrepreneurship at Euromed Management, Marseille. He is married to author and leadership and personal development specialist, Erna Oldenboom. They have three children.

== Education ==
He graduated in Econometrics and Operations Research at the University of Antwerp, Belgium and did postgraduate studies in Business Administration at Warwick Business School, UK. He was awarded a PhD from the University of Warwick in Industrial and Business Studies and a Habilitation of Paul Cézanne University, Aix-Marseille III, France. He has held academic positions in Belgium, the Netherlands, France and Spain.

== Career ==
His academic research focus has been on business model innovation and knowledge management; complexity, chaos and change (with a focus on values-based leadership); a quantum interpretation of management, with a focus on consciousness as a corporate driver. A further interest is in integrating art and business and he is experimenting with art forms like flamenco and photography as creative tools for business model innovation

== Selected publications ==
- Aligning information systems with business strategy. The Journal of Strategic Information Systems 1.4 (1992): 205–213
- Galliers, Robert D., and Walter RJ Baets. Information technology and organizational transformation: innovation for the 21st century organization. John Wiley & Sons, Inc., 1998.
- Organizational learning and knowledge technologies in a dynamic environment. Springer Science & Business Media, 1999.
- Some empirical evidence on IS strategy alignment in banking. Information & Management. 30.4 (1996): 155–177.
- Baets, Walter RJ, ed. Knowledge Management and Management Learning: Extending the Horizons of Knowledge-Based Management. Vol. 9. Springer Science & Business Media, 2006.
- Rethinking Growth: Social entrepreneurship for sustainable performance. Palgrave Macmillan 2009. (With E Oldenboom)
- Complexity, learning and organisations: a quantum interpretation of business. Routledge 2006
- Browaeys, Marie-Joëlle, and Walter Baets. Cultural complexity: a new epistemological perspective. The Learning Organization 10.6 (2003): 332–339.
