= Elmi Ahmed Duale =

Elmi Ahmed Duale علمي أحمد دوعاله

Permanent Representative of Somalia to the United Nations
- In office October 2005 – November 2016
- Preceded by: Ahmed Hashi
- Succeeded by: Yusuf Garaad Omar

Personal details
- Born: 1935 (age 90–91) Buloburde, Hiran, Somalia

Elmi Ahmed Duale (born 1935; Somali: Cilmi Axmed Ducaale, Arabic: علمي أحمد دوعاله) is a Somali physician, diplomat and politician.

== Biography ==
Duale was born in Bulo-Burte (Hiran), Somalia in 1935. He graduated from the Sapienza University of Rome in 1960 with a Doctor of Medicine. From 1963 to 1968, he served as Director General of Somalia's Ministry of Health.

In 1969, Duale was elected to the Parliament of Somalia, and was selected as Foreign Minister in this government. From 1970 to 1973, he and the other members of the Cabinet were imprisoned by Siad Barre after Barre assumed power following a coup d'état.

In 1974, Duale joined the World Health Organization (WHO), where he worked for 30 years. He has been the WHO Team Leader of the Programme Coordinator for Nigeria, the WHO Representative for Tanzania and Eritrea, and the WHO Public Health Consultant in Dar es Salaam.

In 2005, he became the Permanent Representative of Somalia to the United Nations in New York City and held the position for 11 years until late 2016.
