= Journal for the Study of Religion =

- Discipline: Religious studies
- Language: English
- Edited by: J. A. Smit

Publication details
- Former name(s): Religion in Southern Africa
- History: 1980–present
- Publisher: Association for the Study of Religion in Southern Africa
- Frequency: Biannually

Standard abbreviations
- ISO 4: J. Study Relig.

Indexing
- ISSN: 1011-7601
- OCLC no.: 186383185

Links
- Journal homepage

The Journal for the Study of Religion is a semi-annual journal published by the Association for the Study of Religion in Southern Africa. It was established in 1980 with the title Religion in Southern Africa, and adopted its current name in 1987.

== See also ==
- Open access in South Africa
