= Centre for Social Research =

- Founded: 1983
- Type: Human Rights
- Purpose: Gender equality, Women's Rights, Children's Rights, Child Education
- Location: Plot No - 2, Nelson Mandela Road, Vasant Kunj, New Delhi - 110070, India
- Method: Education, Service
- Key people: Ranjana Kumari (Director)
- Website: www.csrindia.org

The Centre for Social Research (CSR), established in 1983, is an advocacy group for women based in New Delhi, India. With a stated aim to bring attention and justice to all marginalised and underprivileged areas, it offers services with a focus on restructuring gender relations across the country.

== Women empowerment and eliminating sex selection ==
CSR founded the Gender Training Institute (GTI) to facilitate the empowerment of women and social justice through capacity building and training-related activities; according to the organisation, these activities are aimed at investigating gendered interactions across domains such as media, economy, politics, and culture. Through GTI, it also manages Crisis Intervention Centres (CICs) to combat gender-based violence with direct assistance as well as sensitisation and mobilisation of grassroots communities.

Between December 2007 and December 2009, CSR executed a programme, 'Enhancing the Role of Women in Strengthening Democracy', for the United Nations Democracy Fund (UNDEF). The capacity building programme aimed to empower marginalised women to participate in regional and local political activities to improve female participation in politics. It also implemented the Meri Shakti, Meri Beti (My Daughter, My Strength) project aimed at countering the practice of pre-natal sex selection and eliminating female infanticide.

In 2012, CSR collaborated with the Centre for Public Policy (CPP) at Indian Institute of Management, Bangalore (IIMB) to launch a certificate program, India-Women in Leadership (iWIL).

In 2023, in partnership with the dating app Tinder, CSR launched a safety guide with a view to familiarise Indian users with the essential online dating safety practices.

== See also ==
- Gender discrimination in India
- Dowry law in India
