= Critical Social Policy =

- Discipline: Political science
- Language: English
- Edited by: David Taylor

Publication details
- History: 1981–present
- Publisher: SAGE Publications
- Frequency: Quarterly
- Impact factor: 2.185 (2018)

Standard abbreviations
- ISO 4: Crit. Soc. Policy

Indexing
- ISSN: 0261-0183 (print); 1461-703X (web)
- LCCN: 96069553
- OCLC no.: 479006022

Links
- Journal homepage; Online access; Online archive

Critical Social Policy is a quarterly peer-reviewed academic journal that publishes articles in the field of political science. The journal was established in 1981.

== Abstracting and indexing ==
Critical Social Policy is abstracted and indexed in Scopus and the Social Sciences Citation Index. According to the Journal Citation Reports, its 2013 impact factor is 1.297, ranking it 15th out of 93 in Social Sciences, Interdisciplinary; and 10th out of 42 in the category "Social Issues".
