= Margaret Hewett =

South African legal scholar (1934–2022)

- Born: 1934; Johannesburg, South Africa
- Died: 18 February 2022 (aged 87–88); Cape Town, South Africa
- Education: University of Cape Town, University of Amsterdam
- Spouse: Jeremy Hewett (died 2021)
- Children: two
- Awards: Officer in the Order of Orange-Nassau
- Scientific career
- Fields: Classics, Law
- Workplaces: University of Cape Town
- Doctoral advisor: Theo Veen (University of Amsterdam)

Margaret Louise Hewett (née Hunter; 1934 – 18 February 2022) was a South African authority on the Old Authorities of Roman-Dutch law.

Hewett studied at the university in Cape Town, receiving a BA in History and Classics in 1954, a BA (Hons.) in History in 1955, and a BEd in 1956. She began her career as a teacher, first in South Africa, before moving to England where she taught Latin at Fritham House, a private school in the New Forest. She returned to South Africa in 1963 and married Jeremy Hewett that year.

From 1980 she was affiliated with the Classics department at the University of Cape Town, and was appointed an associate professor. On her retirement in 2000 she was appointed an Honorary Research Associate in that university's Department of Private Law.

On retirement, she completed a doctoral thesis on Ulrik Huber at the University of Amsterdam. Her expertise on the 'Old Authorities' was built through translation work she embarked on at the request of the South African Law Commission, first in 1966. As Andrew Domanski stated in a review of her work in 2005: "Her translations have often been relied upon in the judgments of our courts."

== Publications ==
Publications by Margaret Hewett include:

- Groenewegen van der Made, S. Tractatus de Legibus Abrogatis et Inusitatis in Hollandia vicinisque Regionibus (1649) volume III (1984) and volume IV (1987)
- Voorda, Tractatus de Statutis (1743) (translated by M.L. Hewett and edited by P. Van Warmelo) 1985.
- Matthaeus, A. De Criminibus (1644) (edited and translated by M.L. Hewett and B.C. Stroop volume I (Juta, Cape Town) 1987.
- Van Leeuwen, S. Censura Forensis (1741). Part I, Book V (edited and translated by M.L. Hewett) (published by the Government Printer, Pretoria, on behalf of The South African Law Commission) 1991.
- Voorda, J., Thomas, Ph. J., Van Warmelo, Paul., & Hewett, M. L. (1992). Dictata ad ius hodiernum Jacobi Voordae : secundum librum quod appellatur, differentiae iuris Romani et Belgici. Apud Universitatum Pretoriensem.
- Hewett, M. L. (1995). A bird's eye view of a bookworm's delight : an overview of some libraries and archives in Europe and the USA essential for the legal historian. University of Cape Town.
- Hewett, M. L. (1996). Legal historians, ahoy. University of Cape Town.
- Hewett, M. L. (1998). More bird's eye view of a bookworm's delight : an overview of some libraries and archives in Europe and the USA essential for the legal historian. University of Cape Town.
- Hewett, and Hallebeek. "The Prelate, the Praetor and the Professor: Antonius Matthaeus II and the Crimen Laesae Majestatis, Utrecht 1639–1640." Tijdschrift voor rechtsgeschiedenis 66, no. 1–2 (1998): 115–150.
- de Smidt. "G. Hemmy, De Testimoniis: The Testimony of Aethiopians, Chinese and Other Pagans as Well as of the Hottentots Inhabiting the Cape of Good Hope, Likewise about the Complaints of East Indian Slaves, A Thesis Presented to the University of Leiden in 1770 for the Degree of Doctor of Both Laws, Edited and Translated from the Latin by Margaret Hewett. UCT, [Cape Town] 1998. XXXIII + 2 x p. 9-67." Tijdschrift voor rechtsgeschiedenis 67, no. 3–4 (1999): 392–393.
- Thomasius, C., Hewett, M. L., & Zimmermann, R. (2000). Larva legis aquiliae : the mask of the lex aquilia torn off the action for damage done : a legal treatise. Hart Publishing.
- Hewett, Margaret. "Voorda." Fundamina : a journal of legal history 2003, no. 9 (2003): 103–113.
- Hewett, M. (2005). Quae legentem fefellissent, transferentem fugere non possunt. Fundamina : A Journal of Legal History, 2005(1), 163–171.
- Voorda, Jacobus, and M. L. Hewett. Dictata Ad Ius Hodiernum = Lectures on the Contemporary Law (Ms Leeuwarden P.B.F., Hof 33) given by Jacobus Voorda (1698–1768) at the University of Utrecht. Amsterdam: Royal Netherlands Academy of Arts and Sciences, 2005.
- Hewett, M. (2014). Words, law and a search engine. Fundamina, 20(1), 412–415.

== Awards ==
She was created an Officer in the Orange-Nassau for her services to the Dutch state. She received this honour in recognition for her two-volume translation of Jacobus Voorda's (1698 - 1768) Dictata ad Ius Hodiernum (Lectures on the Contemporary Law). She was awarded this honour on 19 May 2006 in Leeuwarden in the Netherlands on the occasion of the launch of the book.
