= Carolyn Williamson =

South African virologist

- Born: Carolyn
- Citizenship: South Africa
- Occupations: microbiologist, virologist
- Employer: University of Cape Town
- Awards: Fellow of the African Academy of Sciences

Carolyn Williamson is a South African virologist and microbiologist who is a professor of medical virology at the University of Cape Town. She is a fellow of the Royal Society of South Africa and the African Academy of Sciences, and a member of the Academy of Science of South Africa. Her research focuses on HIV vaccine development and prevention of the disease.

== Education and career ==
Williamson earned her PhD from the Department of Microbiology at the University of Cape Town in 1988.
