= Alphose Zingoni =

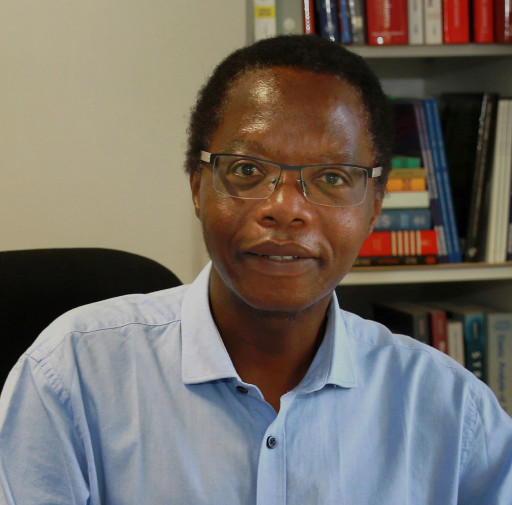
- Alphose Zingoni in November 2019
- Born: 1962 (age 63–64); Masvingo, Zimbabwe
- Education: BSc (Eng), University of Zimbabwe (1984) MSc (Eng), Imperial College London (1988) PhD, Imperial College London (1992)
- Known for: Analytical methods for shell structures Applications of group theory in structural mechanics Author of engineering books SEMC International Conference
- Spouse: Lydia Zingoni (m. 1987)
- Children: Ratidzo, Tafadzwa, Simbarashe
- Scientific career
- Fields: Structural mechanics Structural engineering Shell structures Computational mechanics
- Institutions: University of Cape Town
- Website: www.civil.uct.ac.za/professor-alphose-zingoni

Alphose Zingoni (born 1962) is a Zimbabwean–South African engineer and professor of structural engineering and mechanics in the Department of Civil Engineering at the University of Cape Town, and founder of the Structural Engineering, Mechanics & Computation (SEMC) series of international conferences.

== Early life and education ==
Born in the Masvingo Province of Zimbabwe, Zingoni attended high school at St. Ignatius College in Harare, Zimbabwe, where he completed A Levels in 1980. After earning a bachelor's degree in civil engineering at the University of Zimbabwe in 1984, and working in industry for three years, he went to Imperial College London in the United Kingdom, where he earned an MSc degree in structural engineering in 1988, and a PhD degree in 1992. His PhD thesis was on the bending of non-shallow spherical shells. In 1992, Zingoni was one of six recipients of a Research Fellowship of the Royal Commission for the Exhibition of 1851. Between 1992 and 1994, he pursued postdoctoral research at Imperial College London, where he began using group theory in studying problems involving symmetry in structural mechanics.

== Career ==
Zingoni returned to Zimbabwe in 1994, where he took up appointment with the University of Zimbabwe, and served as Dean of the Faculty of Engineering from 1997 for three years. In 1999, he moved to South Africa to take up appointment with the University of Cape Town, and was inaugurated as Professor of Structural Engineering and Mechanics in 2002. He served as Head of the Department of Civil Engineering at UCT for five years from 2008 to 2012.

== Research ==
Zingoni has made significant contributions in two main areas of structural engineering:

- development of computational formulations for problems involving symmetry in structural mechanics
- development of methods for the practical analysis of thin-shell structures.

He has authored more than 100 peer-reviewed articles in these areas, written four books and edited several volumes of peer-reviewed conference proceedings.

Within structural engineering, Zingoni is one of a relatively small number of investigators who have used the mathematics of group theory to study problems involving symmetry. His work has focused on developing appropriate group-theoretic formulations for the vibration of a number of classes of problems in structural mechanics. These formulations have the benefit of reducing computational effort, a particularly important consideration in large-scale engineering computations. Zingoni's work has also shed alternative insights on the vibration of structures with complex symmetry. His book "Vibration Analysis & Structural Dynamics for Civil Engineers" has been noted for its use of group theory in explaining vibration phenomena

In the area of thin-shell structures, Zingoni has pursued an analytical approach in studying shells of revolution, and developed closed-form results for a variety of problems. His work has contributed to the understanding of the behaviour of engineering shell structures. Zingoni's most significant work in this area is the book "Shell Structures in Civil and Mechanical Engineering", first published in 1997 by Thomas Telford Ltd (Institution of Civil Engineers). The second edition of this book was published in 2018 by ICE Publishing, and has received favourable reviews.

To promote closer cooperation between academics, researchers and practitioners, Zingoni founded the Structural Engineering, Mechanics and Computation (SEMC) series of international conferences at the turn of the millennium. To date, he has organised and chaired eight SEMC conferences at intervals of three years: SEMC 2001, SEMC 2004, SEMC 2007, SEMC 2010, SEMC 2013, SEMC 2016, SEMC 2019 and SEMC 2022. These events have brought to South Africa participants from countries around the world. The associated peer-reviewed Proceedings appear in the section on Books and edited volumes.

== Editorial activities ==
Zingoni has served on the editorial boards of a number of international engineering journals. He has also guest-edited eight special issues of international journals, and has served as the editor of the Proceedings of the International Conferences on Structural Engineering, Mechanics and Computation (SEMC), held in Cape Town every three years since 2001.

== Selected publications ==
- Zingoni A. (Editor). Current Perspectives and New Directions in Mechanics, Modelling and Design of Structural Systems. CRC Press (Taylor & Francis), 2022, London, 2076pp ISBN 978-1-003-34844-3.
- Zingoni A. (Editor). Advances in Engineering Materials, Structures and Systems: Innovations, Mechanics and Applications. CRC Press/Balkema (Taylor & Francis), 2019, London, 2434pp (E-Book of Full Papers); 882pp (Printed Book of Short Papers). ISBN 978-1-138-38696-9.
- Zingoni A. (Author). Shell Structures in Civil and Mechanical Engineering: Theory and Analysis (2nd Edition). ICE Publishing, 2017, London, 464 pp. ISBN 978-0-7277-6028-9.
- Zingoni A. (Author). Vibration Analysis and Structural Dynamics for Civil Engineers: Essentials and Group-Theoretic Formulations. CRC Press/Taylor & Francis, 2014, London, 276 pp. ISBN 978-0-415-52256-4.
- Zingoni A., Mwakali J.A. and Salahuddin A. (Co-Author). Theory and Analysis of Structures: Trusses, Beams, Frames, Plates and Shells. UNESCO, 2000, Nairobi, 222 pp. ISBN 92-9158-012-0.
- Zingoni A. (Author). Shell Structures in Civil and Mechanical Engineering: Theory and Closed-Form Analytical Solutions (1st Edition). Thomas Telford Publishing, 1997, London, 350 pp. ISBN 0-7277-2574-2.
- Zingoni A. (Editor). Insights and Innovations in Structural Engineering, Mechanics and Computation. CRC Press (Taylor & Francis), 2016, London, 2250 pp. ISBN 978-1-138-02927-9 (Book + CD-ROM).
- Zingoni A. (Editor). Research & Applications in Structural Engineering, Mechanics and Computation. CRC Press (Taylor & Francis), 2013, London, 2750 pp. ISBN 978-1-138-00061-2 (Book + CD-ROM).
- Zingoni A. (Editor). Advances and Trends in Structural Engineering, Mechanics and Computation. A.A. Balkema (Taylor & Francis), 2010, London, 1500 pp. ISBN 978-0-415-58472-2 (Book + CD-ROM).
- Zingoni A. (Editor). Recent Developments in Structural Engineering, Mechanics and Computation. Millpress Science, 2007, Rotterdam, 2097 pp. ISBN 978 90 5966 054 0 (Book + CD-ROM).
- Zingoni A. (Editor). Progress in Structural Engineering, Mechanics and Computation. A.A. Balkema/Taylor & Francis, 2004, London, 1800 pp. ISBN 90 5809 568 1 (CD-ROM 90 5809 698 X).
- Zingoni A. (Editor). Structural Engineering, Mechanics and Computation (2 volumes). Elsevier Science, 2001, Oxford, 1660 pp. ISBN 0080439489.

== Honours and awards ==
In 1992, Zingoni was awarded a Research Fellowship of the Royal Commission for the Exhibition of 1851. He was elected a Fellow of the Institution of Structural Engineers in 2005, a Fellow of the South African Academy of Engineering in 2008., and a Fellow of the International Association for Bridge and Structural Engineering (IABSE) in 2011. In 2005, Zingoni was elected a Member of the Academy of Science of South Africa (ASSAf). In 2016, he was elected a Fellow of the University of Cape Town. In 2019, he was a joint recipient of the UCT Book Award for his book "Shell Structures in Civil and Mechanical Engineering" In 2023, he was awarded an A1 rating by the National Research Foundation of South Africa.

== Klaus-Jurgen Bathe Leadership Programme ==
Zingoni was the director of the Klaus-Jürgen Bathe Leadership Programme of the University of Cape Town, from 2014 to 2024. The Programme was established in 2014 through a gift donated by Klaus-Jürgen Bathe, an alumnus of UCT. The primary goal of the Programme is "to produce graduates with outstanding leadership qualities and a strong sense of social justice, who will go on to play leading and significant roles in business, government, industry and civil society in South Africa and on the African continent"
