= Trefor Jenkins =

South African human geneticist (1932–2025)

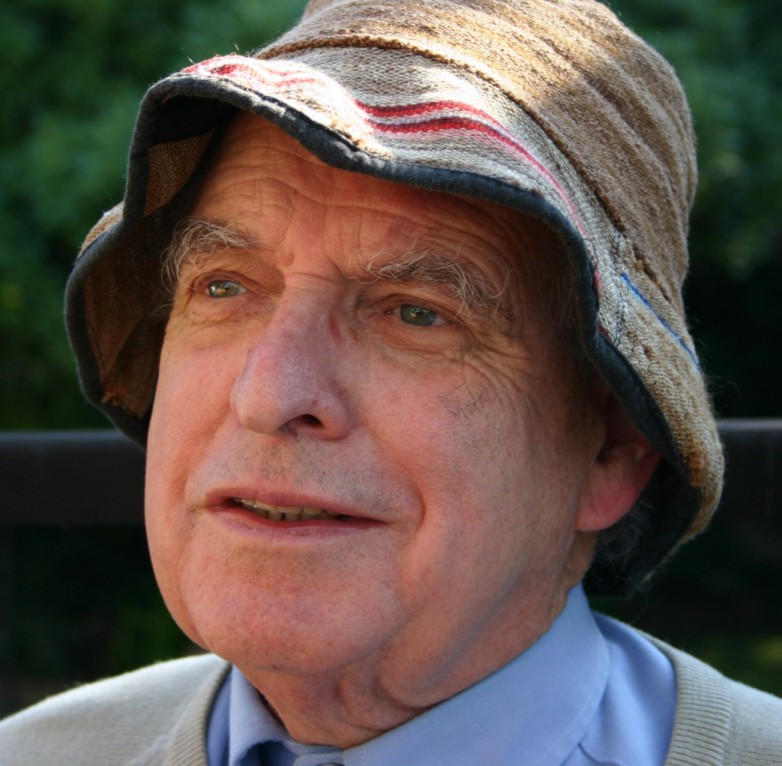
- Born: 24 July 1932; Merthyr Vale
- Died: 2 July 2025 (aged 92)
- Citizenship: South Africa
- Occupation: geneticist
- Employer: University of the Witwatersrand
- Awards: Member of the Academy of Science of South Africa Fellow of the Royal Society of South Africa

Trefor Jenkins (24 July 1932 – 2 July 2025) was a South African human geneticist, noted for his work on DNA. He was dean of the medical school at the University of Witwatersrand.

== Early life ==
Jenkins qualified in medicine at King's College and Westminster Hospital in London. He came to Africa as a mine medical officer in Southern Rhodesia in 1960 where he first encountered sickle cell anaemia which started his interest in genetics.

== Work ==
Jenkins contributed significantly to the knowledge of gene markers in different populations through his work on the genetics of blood groups and DNA polymorphisms, which helped to clarify the origins of indigenous groups in Africa. He also studied sickle cell anaemia and albinism at the molecular level. He published and collaborated in over 300 papers and two books.

== Medical ethics ==
Jenkins also pioneered an undergraduate teaching project in Medical Ethics at the University of the Witwatersrand and made considerable contributions in this field, notably in the ethical ramifications of molecular biology. Jenkins was also a human rights activist, and was one of six doctors, who questioned the ethics of the medical establishment and the previous South African government after the death, in custody, of Steve Biko, the Black Consciousness leader, in September 1977.

== Later life and death ==
Jenkins retired from full-time professorial duties in 1997, but continued to teach at Witwatersrand University and work at the Division of Human Genetics, National Health Laboratory Service. Jenkins headed the Department of Human Genetics, School of Pathology, at the former South African Institute for Medical Research and at the University of the Witwatersrand, between June 1975 and September 1998. He was emeritus professor and an honorary professorial research fellow as well as honorary lecturer in bioethics.

Jenkins died on 2 July 2025, aged 92.

== Publications ==
- Biko to Guantanamo: 30 years of medical involvement in torture David J Nicholl, Trefor Jenkins, Steven H Miles, William Hopkins, Adnan Siddiqui, Frank Boulton, on behalf of 260 other signatories The Lancet - Vol. 370, Issue 9590, 8 September 2007, Page 823
- The Steve Biko affair Trefor Jenkins, GR McLean The Lancet - Vol. 364, December 2004, Pages 36–37
- A Search for Origins : Science, History and South Africa's 'Cradle of Humankind' : Phillip Bonner, Trefor Jenkins, Amanda Esterhuysen (April 2008)
- The Peoples of Southern Africa : Studies in Diversity and Disease : Trefor Jenkins, Institute for the Study of Man in Africa (January 1988)
- The Peoples of Southern Africa and Their Affinities : J.S. Weiner, George T. Nurse, Trefor Jenkins (March 1986)
- Health and the Hunter-Gatherer : Biomedical Studies on the Hunting and Gathering Populations of Southern Africa : George T. Nurse, Trefor Jenkins (January 1977)

== See also ==
- Single nucleotide polymorphism
