= Anthropologica =

- Discipline: Anthropology
- Language: English/French
- Edited by: Alexandrine Boudreault-Fournier

Publication details
- History: 1955-present
- Publisher: University of Victoria Libraries (Canada)
- Frequency: Biannual

Standard abbreviations
- ISO 4: Anthropologica

Indexing
- CODEN: ATRPBS
- ISSN: 0003-5459 (print); 2292-3586 (web)
- LCCN: 56004160
- OCLC no.: 610393076

Links
- Journal homepage; Online archive

Anthropologica is a biannual peer-reviewed academic journal and the official publication of the Canadian Anthropology Association, published by University of Victoria Libraries. It was established in 1955 and the editor-in-chief is Alexandrine Boudreault-Fournier (University of Victoria).

== Abstracting and indexing ==
The journal is abstracted and indexed in:

- Anthropological Index Online
- EBSCO databases
- International Bibliography of Periodical Literature
- International Bibliography of the Social Sciences
- MLA International Bibliography
- PsycINFO
- Scopus
- Sociological Abstracts
