= South African Medical Journal =

- Discipline: Medicine
- Language: English
- Edited by: J.P. van Niekerk, Nonhlanhla P. Khumalo, Emma Buchanan

Publication details
- History: 1884-present
- Publisher: Health & Medical Publishing Group (South Africa)
- Frequency: Monthly
- Open access: Yes
- License: cc-by-nc
- Impact factor: 1.325 (2009)

Standard abbreviations
- ISO 4: S. Afr. Med. J.

Indexing
- CODEN: SAMJEJ
- ISSN: 0256-9574 (print); 2078-5135 (web)
- LCCN: 45053744
- OCLC no.: 03582234

Links
- Journal homepage; Online access; Online archive

The South African Medical Journal is a monthly peer-reviewed open-access medical journal which has been published in South Africa since 1884. It is sponsored by the South African Medical Association and published by the association's publishing arm, the Health & Medical Publishing Group. Daniel Ncayiyana was the journal's first black editor-in-chief.

== Abstracting and indexing ==
The journal is abstracted and indexed in BIOSIS Previews, Current Contents/Clinical Medicine, PubMed/MEDLINE, and the Science Citation Index. According to the Journal Citation Reports, the journal's 2009 impact factor is 1.325, ranking it 65th out of 133 journals in the category "Medicine, General & Internal".

== International affairs ==
In 1933, following the rise of the Nazi Party in Germany, a correspondent for the journal reported on the systematic oppression of Jewish medical professionals in Germany. These actions included denial of graduations for Jewish medical students, employment bans, forced resignations, raids on a Jewish medical association, and violent attacks on individual doctors. The report concluded that the actions of the Nazi regime likely had the tacit support of the German medical establishment and ended with the request that South African doctors protest the actions.

== See also ==
- Open access in South Africa
