= Justine Burns =

South African economist

- Born: May 31, 1972
- Died: February 7, 2026 (aged 53)
- Occupation: Professor at the University of Cape Town

Academic background
- Education: University of Massachusetts at Amherst (PhD, 2004)

Academic work
- Discipline: Economics
- Sub-discipline: Behavioural economics
- Main interests: Experimental economics, social trust and prosocial behaviour, labour markets, inequality and intergenerational mobility

Justine Burns (31 May 1972 - 7 February 2026) was a South African economist who was director of the School of Economics at the University of Cape Town (UCT), where she was also a professor. She was a research associate at the university's Southern Africa Labour and Development Research Unit (SALDRU) and Research Unit in Behavioural Economics and Neuroeconomics (RUBEN).

Burns's research interests, primarily in behavioural economics, include discrimination, trust and social capital, social networks and labour markets, and intergenerational mobility. She published research about social assistance programmes. She received UCT's Distinguished Teacher Award in 2006 and was admitted to the Academy of Science of South Africa in October 2021.
