= Qualitative Sociology =

- Discipline: Humanities, social sciences and law
- Language: English
- Edited by: Claudio E. Benzecry and Andrew Deener

Publication details
- History: March 1997-Present
- Publisher: Springer (Netherlands)
- Impact factor: 1.227 (2016)

Standard abbreviations
- ISO 4: Qual. Sociol.

Indexing
- ISSN: 0162-0436

Links
- Journal homepage

Qualitative Sociology is an academic journal dealing with sociology. It publishes research papers on the qualitative interpretation of social life. This includes photographic studies, historical analysis, comparative analysis, and ethnography. The editors-in-chief are Claudio E. Benzecry (Northwestern University) and Andrew Deener (University of Connecticut).

== Abstracting and indexing ==
Qualitative Sociology is abstracted and indexed in the Social Sciences Citation Index. According to the Journal Citation Reports, the journal has a 2016 impact factor of 1.227.
