= Eric Crichton =

South African obstetrician (1888–1962)

Eric Cuthbert Crichton (1888-1962) was the first professor in obstetrics and gynaecology in South Africa at the University of Cape Town.

He was born 18 September 1888 in Yorkshire, but the family moved to Carrowgarry, County Sligo, soon after. He was the great-grandson of the physician Alexander Crichton. He graduated from Trinity College Dublin (M.B., B.Ch.) in 1912.

During the First World War he served as an officer with the Royal Army Medical Corps and saw active service in Egypt and Palestine. He served as medical officer to the 1/5 Suffolk regiment in 1917 when Allenby entered Jerusalem. Crichton was mentioned in despatches. He was subsequently adjutant, physician and consultant at the No. 7 Red Cross Hospital in Montazah. It was there that he met Helen Aukett, matron of the Red Cross Hospital. They married on 3 November 1919. They had two children.

He was one of three professors who arrived in Cape Town in 1920 to establish the first full medical faculty.
