= Peter Dunsby =

- Born: 12 November 1966 (age 59)
- Education: Queen Mary University of London
- Awards: S2A3 British Association Medal (2006)
- Scientific career
- Fields: cosmology, gravity
- Workplaces: University of Cape Town National Astrophysics and Space Science Programme
- Doctoral advisor: Malcolm MacCallum
- Website: peterdunsby.net

Peter Dunsby (born 12 November 1966) is a full professor of gravitation and cosmology at the Department of Mathematics and Applied Mathematics at the University of Cape Town, South Africa. He was the co-director of the Astrophysics, Cosmology and Gravity Centre at the university until 2016. He also serves on the editorial board of the International Journal of Modern Physics.

Dunsby has published extensively in the fields of cosmology and gravitation, including higher-order theories of gravity and f(R) gravity, and was the founding Director of the South African National Astrophysics and Space Science Programme (NASSP).

In 2006, Dunsby was awarded the silver medal by the Southern African Association for the Advancement of Science for his contributions to theoretical cosmology. The committee called out his research on cosmic microwave background radiation and study of study of Type Ia supernova which increased accuracy of calculation of the Hubble parameter. In 2016 he was presented the award for Human Capacity Development by the National Science and Technology Forum for his work developing postgraduate students and post doctoral researchers.

In October 2017 Dunsby was elected to the College of Fellows of the University of Cape Town.

Dunsby briefly received international attention following a 20 March 2018 report of a "very bright optical transient near the Trifid and Lagoon Nebulae" to the Astronomers Telegram, an internet service for quickly disseminating information about astronomical events. Forty minutes later he posted again, saying that the object in question was "identified as Mars". Dunsby later described the incident to Newsweek as "an honest mistake arising from simply not checking what else was in my camera frame, during an automated astrophotography session and of very little consequence in the scheme of things, but agreed it was rather funny. The world needs to smile more, so that’s something good that has come out of this episode.” The Astronomer's Telegram editors presented Dunsby with a tongue-in-cheek award as discoverer of Mars.
