= National Astrophysics and Space Science Programme =

Research and development center and SANSA field center in Pretoria

The National Astrophysics and Space Science Programme (NASSP) is a South African space science research organization. The organization was founded in 2003.

The cosmologist Peter Dunsby was the founding Director of the NASSP for its first ten years.

== See also ==
- South African National Space Agency
