= Elmi Muller =

South African medical specialist

- Education: University of Pretoria; University of Cape Town
- Occupations: Medical Specialist, Transplant Surgeon and Dean: Faculty of Medicine and Health Sciences, Stellenbosch University

Elmi Muller is a South African medical specialist who specialised in General Surgery and Transplantation. She currently performs kidney as well as liver transplants in both adults and children. She is the past President of the Southern African Transplantation Society who pioneered an organ transplant programme at Groote Schuur Hospital in Cape Town for HIV positive patients using HIV positive donors. She also serves on the Executive committee of The Transplantation Society of which she currently is the vice-president. Elmi was the Chair/Head of the Division of General Surgery at Groote Schuur Hospital, University of Cape Town. She currently serves as Dean: Faculty of Medicine and Health Sciences at Stellenbosch University.

== Biography ==
Elmi Muller has been a full-time medical specialist at Groote Schuur Hospital and UCT Private Academic Hospital since 2007. Since 2007 she has been involved in many organ transplant-related outreach and education programmes for the public and the medical profession in South Africa. She is also an active participant in the International Society of Nephrology's Educational Ambassador program and has provided training and teaching in the field of Transplantation and Surgery in several African countries. Elmi has been co-chairing the Declaration of Istanbul Custodian Group between 2014 and 2018. Muller co-chaired the 2018 edition of the Declaration.

She pioneered an HIV positive-to-positive organ transplantation at Groote Schuur Hospital in Cape Town. This was the first program in the world to use HIV positive donors for HIV positive recipients. The outcomes of these transplants had been published in the New England Journal of Medicine. Her work had been featured in many journals The Lancet also published a profile on her in 2012 called Elmi Muller: bending rules, changing guidelines, making history.

Known as the pioneering clinician who performed the first HIV-positive-to-positive kidney transplants in the world, Prof Elmi Muller, has recently been appointed as the new Dean of the Faculty of Medicine and Health Sciences at Stellenbosch University (SU).

Muller, was Head of both the Division of General Surgery and the Transplant Unit in the Groote Schuur Hospital at the University of Cape Town (UCT), and succeeded Prof Jimmy Volmink whose second term has come to an end on January 1, 2022. Muller is the first woman to be appointed as Dean of the Faculty.

== Education ==
After graduating with a M.B. Ch.B. from the University of Pretoria in 1995, Muller was awarded a M.Med. (Surgery) in 2007, as well as PhD (Surgery) degree in 2018 from the University of Cape Town (UCT).

== Professional memberships ==
A member of the UK's Royal College of Surgeons and a Fellow of the College of Surgeons in South Africa, Muller was awarded Fellowship of the American College of Surgeons in 2013.

== Awards and accolades ==
Muller received the Transplantation Society's Women in Transplant Hero Award in 2016 and became an honorary member of the European Surgical Association in the same year. In 2014 she was the recipient of CEO Magazine's Most Influential Woman in Business and Government: Africa award, and was the winner of the health care category of the Most Influential Women in Africa in 2013. She and was the winner of the Checkers Shoprite Woman of the Year award in the health care section for 2011.

== Other projects ==
Muller is involved in creating equitable organ allocation systems in South Africa, setting up guidelines and processes for kidney and liver allocation in the Western Cape and the rest of the country.
