= Jane Bennett (artist) =

Australian artist (born 1960)

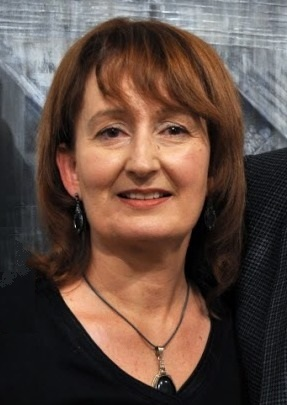
- Artist Jane Bennett
- Born: Jane Ann Cooper Bennett; 1960 (age 65–66); Manly, New South Wales
- Education: Alexander Mackie College of Advanced Education
- Awards: Wynne Prize 1990 and 1995; 1996 Wynne Pring Prize for Watercolour; 1995 Wynne Trustees’ Prize for Watercolour

Jane Ann Cooper Bennett (born 1960) is an Australian painter.

== Biography ==
Born at Manly, New South Wales, Australia in 1960, Bennett's parents divorced before her birth. She was raised by her mother and grandparents in the family home at Seaforth and attended Mackellar Girls High School and Ku-ring-gai High School. In 1979 she enrolled at the Alexander Mackie College of Advanced Education attaining a Diploma of Fine Arts in 1982 and a Graduate Diploma in Art Studies the subsequent year.

Amongst the many accolades she has received, Bennett achieved recognition as a finalist in the 1986, 1997 and 2008 Sir John Sulman Prize, 5 times a finalist in the Dobell Prize and 6 times a finalist in the Wynne Prize, winning the 1990, 1995 and 1996 Pring Prize for Watercolour and the 1995 Trustees’ Prize for Watercolour. In total she has won over 120 art prizes in a career spanning more than 30 years.

== Art ==
Bennett is a plein air painter with a passion for recording the process of urban renewal. She is renowned for her paintings of abandoned industrial and maritime sites in and around Sydney. Subjects of her art include: Balmain, Pyrmont and White Bay Power Stations, CSR Refinery, AGL Gasworks, Carlton United Brewery, Eveleigh Railway Workshops, Cockatoo Island and wharves at White Bay, Glebe Island, Pyrmont, Barangaroo, Walsh Bay and Woolloomooloo.

Her work is represented in many collections including:

- State Library of New South Wales
- Artbank
- National Trust of Australia
- University of New South Wales
- University of Sydney
- Department of Defence (Australia)

== Gallery ==
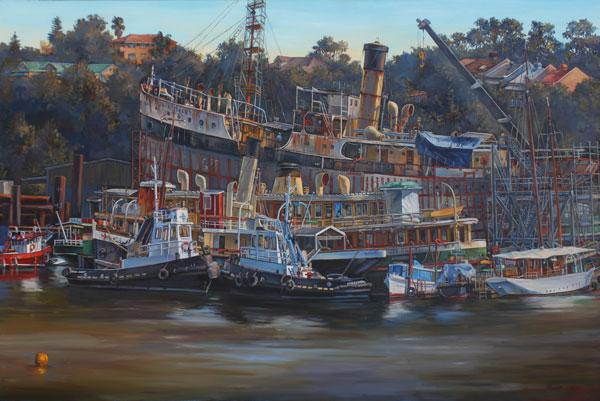
'Hail Hail the Gang’s All Here - Sydney Heritage Fleet at Rozelle', 2013, oil on canvas, 122 x 183 cm, © Jane Bennett

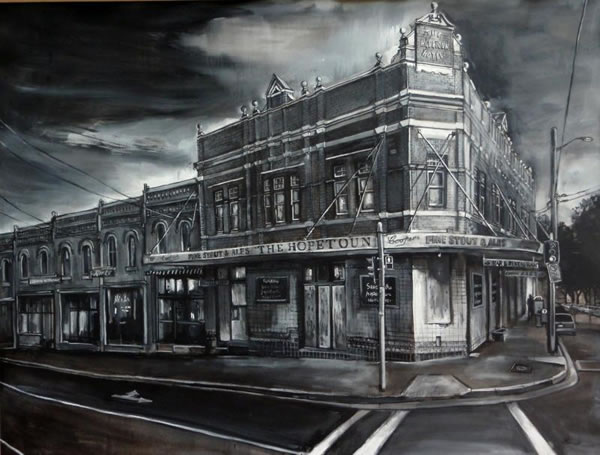
'Last Hope - Hopetoun Hotel', 2009, mixed media on paper, 107 x 140 cm, © Jane Bennett

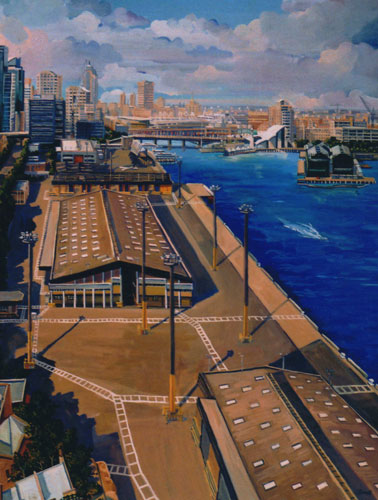
'The Hungry Mile from the Harbour Control Tower 2', 2008, gouache on paper, 101 x 76 cm, © Jane Bennett

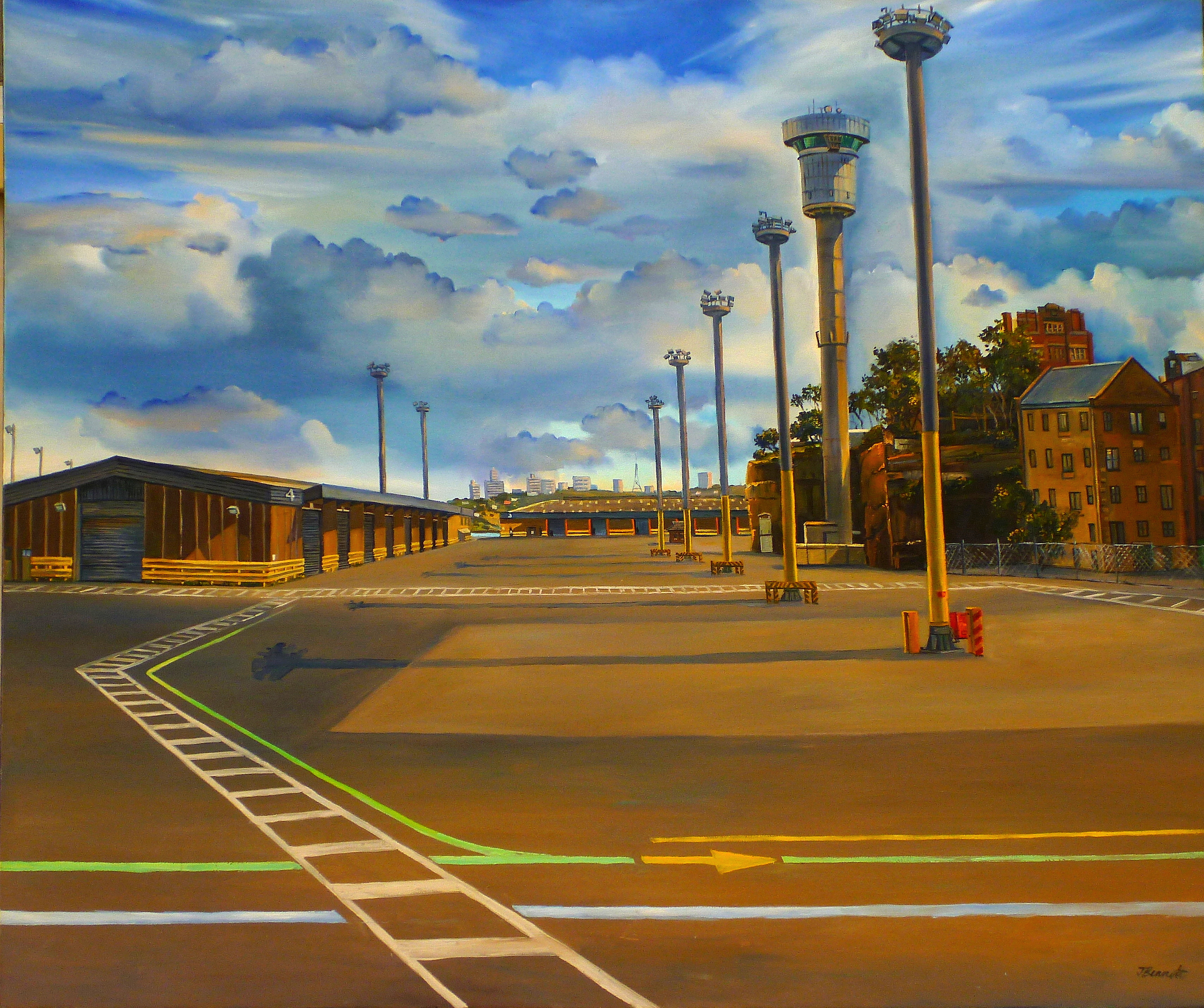
'The empty wharf from shed 5', oil on canvas, 100 x 122 cm, 2008, © Jane Bennett

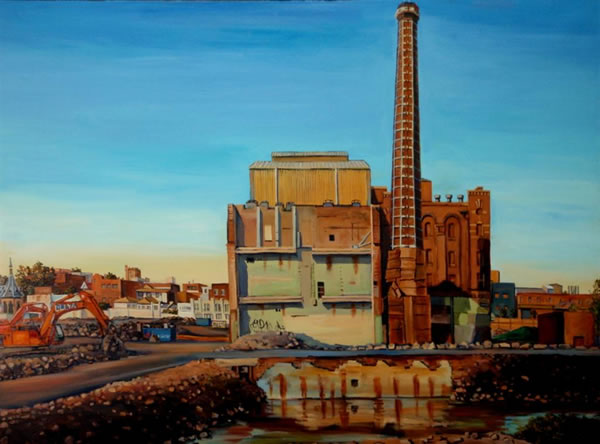
'Pub with no beer II - Carlton United Brewery', 2009, oil on canvas, © Jane Bennett

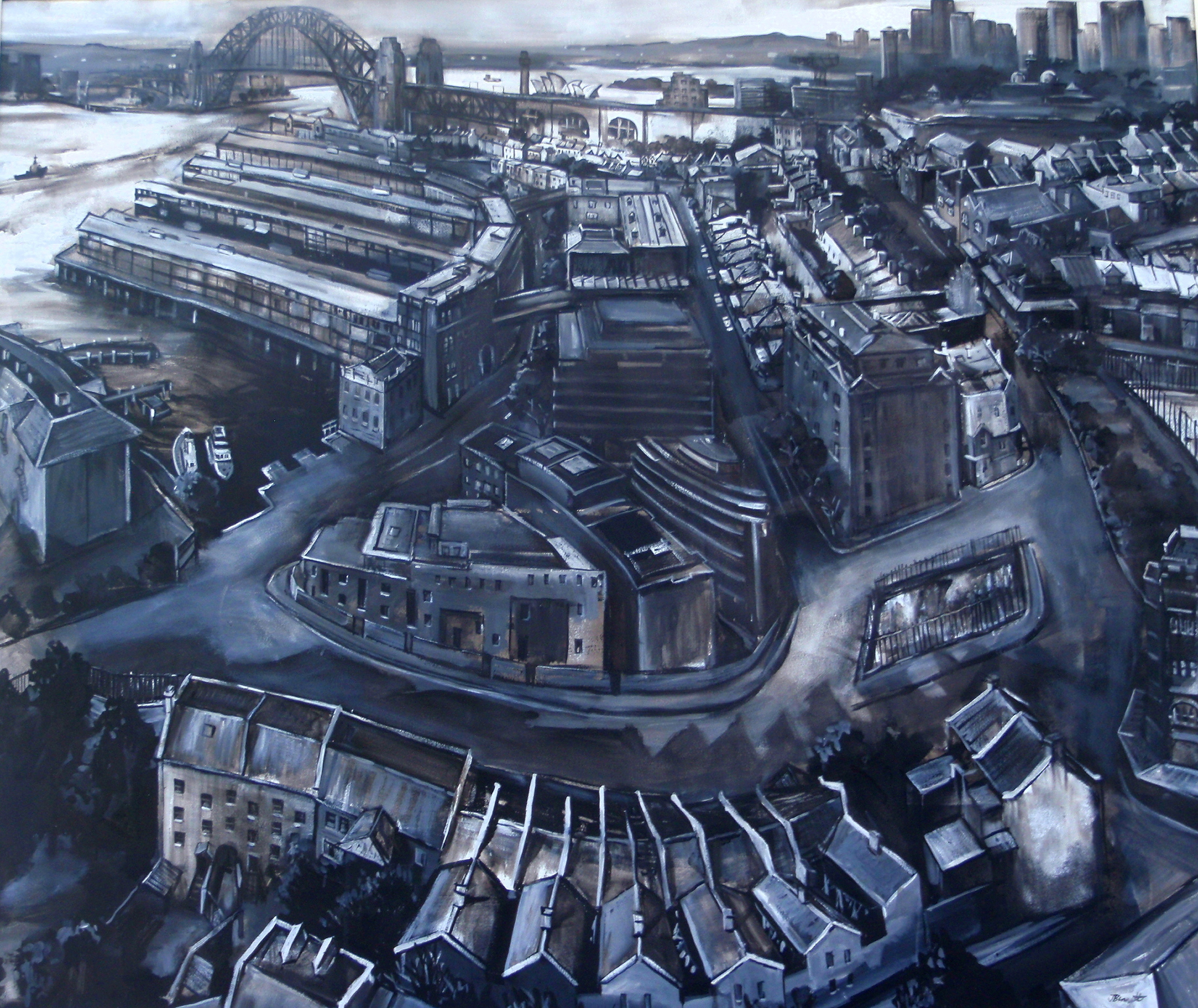
'Millers Point from top of Harbour Tower', ink acrylic gouache on paper, 120 x 131 cm, © Jane Bennett

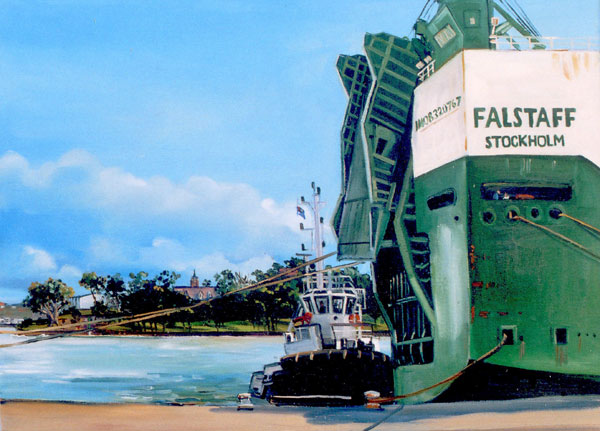
'The Falstaff with the tug Woona', oil on canvas, 36 x 45 cm, © Jane Bennett
