= Jane Bennett (feminist scholar) =

South African academic

In 2004, Jane Bennett co-edited Jacketed Women: Qualitative Research Methodologies on Sexualities and Gender in Africa with Charmaine Pereira. Bennett has a BA from the University of Natal, MPhil and EdD from Columbia University. She has an academic background in linguistics, literature, sociology, and feminist theory.

Since 2009 she has been at the University of Cape Town, South Africa, where she is a Professor as well as the Director of the School of African and Gender Studies, Anthropology and Linguistics. Bennett was also Director of the African Gender Institute at University of Cape Town. The School of African and Gender Studies, Anthropology and Linguistics, created in 2012, merged four previously distinct departments: the African Gender Unit, the Centre for African Studies, the department of Social Anthropology, and department of Linguistics. She headed the English Department at the University of Cape Town between 2016 and 2018, on secondment, and is now the Director of Postgraduate Studies as well as the Deputy Dean of Humanities for Staffing and IT at the University of Cape Town.

Bennett's work reflects the complexities of a researcher separating her personal experiences from her research. Her work demonstrates the interrelationship between feminist research and activism, particularly in Africa. Bennett is a program convener for the African Gender Institute's “Sexual and Reproductive Rights Programme.” She is also on the editorial team of Feminist Africa Journal.

== Selected publications ==
- Muhanguzi, Florence Kyoheirwe, and Jane Bennett. “The Construction and Mediation of Sexuality and Gender Relations: Experiences of Girls and Boys in Secondary Schools in Uganda.” Journal of Feminist Formations 23.3 (2011): 135-152.
- Bennett, Jane. “Researching the Pedagogies of Sexualities in South African Higher Education.” International Journal of Sexual Health 21.4 (2009): 239-252.
- Bennett, Jane. “’Motho ke motho ka batho babang (a person is a person because of other people).” Social Dynamics 10.1 (1984): 90-93.
- Bennett, Jane, and Charmaine Pereira, editors. Jacketed Women: Qualitative Research Methodologies on Sexualities and Gender in Africa. Tokyo, New York, Paris: United Nations University Press, 2013.

Associated Scholar: Charmaine Pereira

In 2004, Charmaine Pereira co-edited Jacketed Women: Qualitative Research Methodologies on Sexualities and Gender in Africa with Jane Bennett. Pereira has a PhD in Psychology of Education from The Open University, Milton Keynes, UK. Pereira teaches in the Sociology department at Ahmadu Bello University, Zaria, Nigeria. Pereira's work explores the challenges that a researcher encounters when interrogating the intersectionality of culture, gender, sexuality, law, and religion.

Bennett is a feminist scholar-activist whose work centers on feminist thought, sexuality, gender education, and civil society and the state. She is based in Abuja, Nigeria and she is a coordinator for the Initiative for Women's Studies in Nigeria. She is a member of Tapestry Consulting, an organization that seeks to create gender equality in the workplace in Africa.

Selected Publications:

Pereira, Charmaine. Gender in the Making of the Nigerian University System. James Currey, 2007.

Pereira, Charmaine, editor. Changing Narratives of Sexuality: Contestations, Compliance and Women’s Empowerment. London, New York: Zed Books, 2014.

Bennett, Jane, and Charmaine Pereira, editors. Jacketed Women: Qualitative Research Methodologies on Sexualities and Gender in Africa. Tokyo, New York, Paris: United Nations University Press, 2013.

Pereira, Charmaine. “Domesticating Women? Gender, Religion and the State in Nigeria Under Colonial and Military Rule.” African Identities 3.1 (2005): 69-94.
