= South African Academy of Engineering =

Engineering organization of South Africa

The South African Academy of Engineering (SAAE) is a non-profit, independent institution with some 151 fellows (June 2009) drawn mainly from the engineering sector of the Republic of South Africa. The aims of the academy are to promote excellence in the science and application of engineering for the benefit of South Africa. The academy's membership is drawn from South Africa's engineers and related professions.
