= South African Research Chairs =

Research Facility

The South African Research Chairs Initiative (SARChI) establishes prestigious research chairs in South African universities with the support of funding from the National Research Foundation (NRF). The programme, launched in 2006 as a joint initiative between the NRF and the national Department of Science and Innovation (DSI), aims to attract and retain excellent researchers in South African public institutions. The research chairs are reserved for established researchers and are renewable for up to 15 years.

== History and management ==
DSI (then called the Department of Science and Technology) established the South African Research Chairs Initiative in 2006 as a means of attracting and retaining "excellence in research and innovation at South African public universities". In particular, the government was concerned to deter brain drain while attracting expatriate, foreign, and private-sector researchers.

The initiative is implemented by the NRF, and a small number of chairs are co-funded with donations from interested businesses. Research chairs funded under the initiative are hosted by a South African university and are supported by sizeable NRF research grants, which cover salaries, postdoctoral fellowships, research equipment and operating costs, and other overhead for the research programme established under the chair. Each chair is established at one of two tiers according to the candidate's track record in research and student supervision: Tier I chairs are reserved for internationally recognised researchers, who are eligible to spend up to 50 per cent of their time outside South Africa, while Tier II chairs are full-time. Chairs can be renewed every five years for up to 15 years.

Supporters of the initiative argue that it ameliorates brain drain, boosts research output and capacity for postgraduate supervision, supports affirmative action efforts in respect of gender and race, and results in broader economic benefits by boosting research and development capacity.

== Distribution of chairs ==
Applications for new research chairs are solicited and approved at the discretion of DSI and the NRF. Upon its launch in 2006, the initiative established 21 chairs and set a target of supporting 210 chairs by 2010, representing an investment of close to R10-billion over 15 years. By mid-2011, only 92 research chairs had been established, though they accounted for an outsized proportion of the country's total research output – comprising 1.5 per cent of all active researchers in South Africa, they produced 4.5 per cent of national research outputs.

By 2015, the number of research chairs had grown to 150. Later that year, noting that men accounted for 80 per cent of SARChI recipients, Naledi Pandor (then the Minister of Science and Technology) announced an unprecedented call for applications that was open only to women researchers; 42 women were approved for new research chairs, bringing the total stock of research chairs to 201 and close to gender parity.

Especially in the early years of the initiative, there was debate in the academic community about the equity of the distribution of the research chairs across disciplines and institutions. Early grants were concentrated at South Africa's top-ranked research universities, such as the University of Cape Town and University of the Witwatersrand; however, by 2012, 21 of the country's 23 universities hosted at least one chair, and the representation of former technikons had improved vastly. Similarly, the initiative was initially criticised for its narrow focus on research topics in science, which were more closely aligned to the government's strategic priorities, but greater provision was later made for humanities and social science researchers to obtain research chairs in an "open" category.

== Notable people ==
=== Current chairs ===
Name	Title of chair	Host institution	Ref.
Cathi Albertyn	Equality, Law and Social Justice	Witwatersrand University	
Priscilla Baker	Analytical Systems and Processes for Priority and Emerging Contaminants	University of the Western Cape	
Jacek Banasiak	Mathematical Models and Methods in Bioengineering and Biosciences	University of Pretoria	
Haroon Bhorat	Economic Growth, Poverty and Inequality	University of Cape Town	
Reinette Biggs	Social-Ecological Systems and Resilience	Stellenbosch University	
Pumla Gobodo-Madikizela	Violent Histories and Transgenerational Trauma	Stellenbosch University	
Amanda Gouws	Gender Politics	Stellenbosch University	
Pumla Dineo Gqola	African Feminist Imaginations	Nelson Mandela University	
Ruth Hall	Poverty, Land and Agrarian Studies	University of the Western Cape	
Patricia Hayes	Visual History and Theory	University of the Western Cape	
Cang Hui	Mathematical and Theoretical Physical Biosciences	Stellenbosch University	
Namrita Lall	Plant Health Products from Indigenous Knowledge Systems	University of Pretoria	
Janice Limson	Biotechnology Innovation and Engagement	Rhodes University	
Catriona Macleod	Critical Studies in Sexualities and Reproduction	Rhodes University	
Thokozani Majozi	Sustainable Process Engineering	Witwatersrand University	
Penny Moore	Virus-Host Dynamics for Public Health	Witwatersrand University	
Caroline Ncube	Intellectual Property, Innovation and Development	University of Cape Town	
Philiswa Nomngongo	Nanotechnology for Water	University of Johannesburg	
Kenneth Ozoemena	Materials Electrochemistry and Energy Technologies	Witwatersrand University	
Leila Patel	Welfare and Social Development	University of Johannesburg	
Michèle Ramsay	Bioinformatics of African Populations	Witwatersrand University	
Mike Roberts	Marine Food Security (with the University of Southampton)	Nelson Mandela University	
Judith Sealy	Stable Isotopes in Archaeology and Paleoenvironmental Studies	University of Cape Town	
Melissa Steyn	Critical Diversity Studies	Witwatersrand University	
Caroline Tiemessen	HIV Vaccine Translational Research	Witwatersrand University	
Dire Tladi	International Constitutional Law	University of Pretoria	
Fiona Tregenna	Industrial Development	University of Johannesburg	
Cherryl Walker	Sociology of Land, Environment and Sustainable Development	Stellenbosch University	
Amanda Weltman	Physical Cosmology	University of Cape Town	
Brenda Wingfield	Fungal Genomics	University of Pretoria	

=== Former chairs ===
Name	Title of chair	Institution	Ref.
Jill Adler	Mathematics Education	Witwatersrand University	
Alan Christoffels	Bioinformatics and Public Health	University of the Western Cape	
Felix Dapare Dakora	Agrochemurgy and Plant Symbioses	Tshwane University of Technology	
Tania Douglas	Biomedical Engineering and Innovation	University of Cape Town	
Carolyn Hamilton	Archive and Public Culture	University of Cape Town	
Catherine Odora Hoppers	Development Education	University of South Africa	
Murray Leibbrandt	Poverty and Inequality Research	University of Cape Town	
Shabir Madhi	Vaccine-Preventable Diseases	Witwatersrand University	
Thumbi Ndung'u	Systems Biology of HIV/AIDS	University of KwaZulu-Natal	
Lungisile Ntsebeza	Land Reform and Democracy in South Africa	University of Cape Town	
Tebello Nyokong	Medicinal Chemistry and Nanotechnology	Rhodes University	
Francesco Petruccione	Quantum Information Processing and Communication	University of KwaZulu-Natal	
Daya Reddy	Computational Mechanics	University of Cape Town	
Alta Schutte	Early Detection and Prevention of Cardiovascular Disease in Africa	North-West University	
Peter Weingart	Science Communication	Stellenbosch University	
Anna-Lise Williamson	Vaccinology	University of Cape Town	

== See also ==
- UNESCO Chairs
- Academy of Science of South Africa
