= Timeline of the SARS-CoV-2 Omicron variant =

This timeline of the SARS-CoV-2 Omicron variant (November 2021 – February 2022) is a dynamic list, and as such may never satisfy criteria of completeness. Some events may only be fully understood and/or discovered in retrospect.

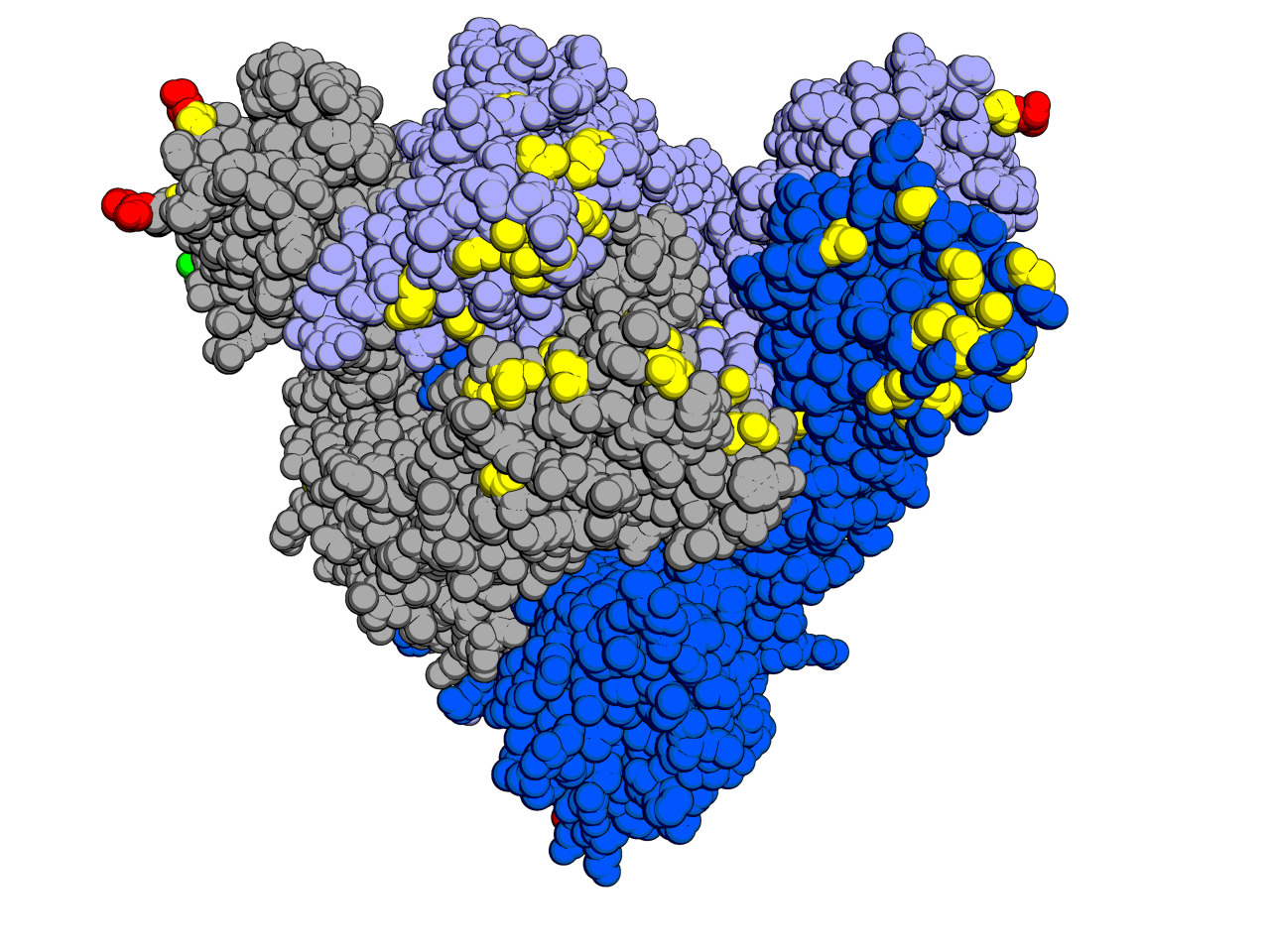
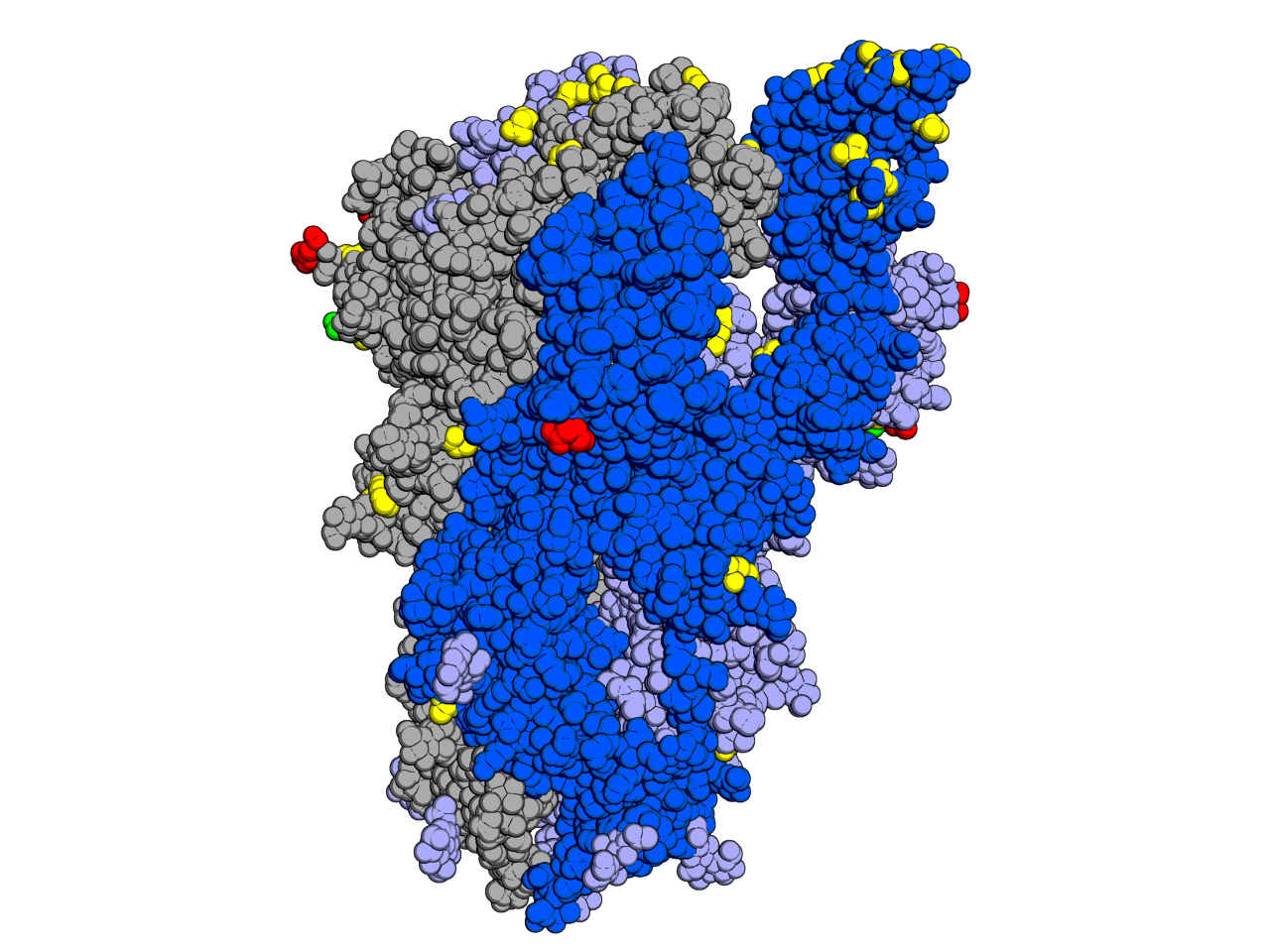
The extensive mutations of its spike proteins make for the Omicron variant. Mutation data from WHO; structure from PDB: 6VYB.

== November 2021 ==
=== 4 November ===
South African scientists begin seeing samples where PCR tests have S-gene target failure (which occurs in a few variants, but not in Delta which had by far dominated in the country in October), alerting them to a change in epidemiology.

=== 8 November ===
The first confirmed sample of what would eventually be named the Omicron variant by the World Health Organization (WHO) is collected in South Africa.

=== 9 November ===
Other samples of the Omicron variant are collected in Botswana by South African scientists under the aegis of Network for Genomic Surveillance South Africa (NGS-SA).

=== 14–23 November ===
More than 70 percent of sequenced samples from Gauteng province in South Africa are Omicron, indicating that it already has become the dominant variant in the province.

=== 24 November ===
South Africa makes its first report of B.1.1.529 (as it is scientifically known) to WHO, based on samples that had been collected from 14 to 16 November.

=== 25 November ===
The variation first comes to public notice at a virtual press conference called by the Health Department of South Africa. Richard Lessells, an infectious-diseases physician at the University of KwaZulu-Natal, remarked that "There's a lot we don't understand about this variant... The mutation profile gives us concern, but now we need to do the work to understand the significance of this variant and what it means for the response to the pandemic." Professor Penny Moore, a virologist at the University of the Witwatersrand said of the pace of this research that "we're flying at warp speed". At this point there are 87 cases in five countries and an estimated 990 probable cases, with the most confirmed cases in South Africa at 77.

=== 26 November ===
On 26 November at an emergency meeting in Geneva, Switzerland WHO's Technical Advisory Group on SARS-CoV-2 Virus Evolution designated PANGO lineage B.1.1.529 a variant of concern (VOC) and gave it the designation Omicron (skipping Nu and Xi, the next letters in the Greek alphabet in keeping with its nomenclature protocol introduced for the Delta variant). At this point there are 96 confirmed cases worldwide in South Africa, Botswana, England, Hong Kong, Italy, Israel, and Belgium, and 2 probable cases in Germany and 1 in Czech Republic.

=== 27 November ===
The first two cases in the United Kingdom are announced. Additionally it was announced via Twitter that Malawi, Mozambique, Zambia and Angola were to be added to the UK's Red List as of Sunday at 4:00 a.m. GMT genomic sequencing having been performed overnight, thus joining South Africa, Botswana, Lesotho, Eswatini, Zimbabwe, and Namibia. Furthermore, Switzerland adds the UK to its "at risk" list along with other countries with cases.

=== 28 November ===
Two Danish returnees from South Africa test positive, and another two people with recent travel in Nigeria test positive in Ottawa, Canada. A third case is detected in the UK, but the individual concerned, who had traveled from southern Africa, is no longer in the country, instigating high-level contact tracing. Israel bans entry to all foreign nationals and puts travel to fifty African countries on its red list. Morocco closes its borders for two weeks.

The first 13 cases are identified among 61 SARS-CoV-2 cases from two flights from South Africa to The Netherlands on November 26; the passengers involved, numbering approximately 624, were in mid-flight when EU restrictions were imposed. Five additional cases among these passengers were confirmed a week later.

Two cases were detected in Sydney, Australia. Both people had landed in Sydney the previous day, and had traveled from southern Africa to Sydney via Doha, Qatar. The two people, who were fully vaccinated, entered isolation; 12 other travelers from southern Africa also entered quarantine for fourteen days, while about 260 other passengers and crew on the flight have been directed to isolate.

South African President Cyril Ramaphosa addressed the Nation at 20:00 SAST. He highlighted a few key points in his address. Firstly he explained the arrival of the new Omicron variant and stated that over the next 2 weeks, South African scientists will be working on understand and testing the effectiveness of vaccines against this new Variant. He called for nations who closed borders to reopen then cited that the closure "is not informed by science, nor will it be effective in preventing the spread of the Omicron coronavirus variant". Secondly, he called for the country to vaccinate. Finally he announced the country would not go into lockdown, but introduced a minor curfew and a limit on gathering. A further address is set to take place next week on 5 December 2021 to evaluate whether a lockdown is needed.

The affairs ministry of South Africa said that it was dismayed by its 'punishment' for discovering the variant and that 'excellent science should be applauded and not punished'.

=== 29 November ===
Australia records its third case of the variant in a national repatriated from Johannesburg. He was undertaking mandatory isolation in the Howard Springs quarantine facility in the Northern Territory. The first six cases are identified in Scotland (bringing the total in the UK to nine): four in the Lanarkshire area and two in Greater Glasgow and Clyde area. Spain and Sweden report their first cases, the latter from a sample taken less than a week prior from a traveler from South Africa. India announces that a portion of the stock of its own vaccines (under the aegis of COVAX) shall be shipped to afflicted African nations. At a special session of the World Health Assembly WHO presents the variant as having a very high global risk.

=== 30 November ===
Ecuador and Japan impose international travel restrictions. The US also tightens its restrictions. Japan reports its first case as does France (on the Indian Ocean island of Réunion). China's leader Xi Jinping pledges 30 million doses of its own vaccine to Africa by way of addressing global vaccine inequity, with 400 million to follow (produced by Chinese-owned companies in Africa). In the Netherlands, two additional cases are identified in older samples that were retroactively checked for the new variant, dating back to 19 and 23 November.

== December 2021 ==
=== 1 December ===
- United States, Saudi Arabia, Ghana, South Korea, Norway and Nigeria announce their first cases. The Dutch health ministry announces that its first cases date back to November 19 and 23. WHO advises the COVID-vulnerable, including those over 60, not to travel, and more than fifty countries have implemented new travel restrictions.
- Ireland announces its first case, apparently from community transmission.
- The Israeli Ministry of Health has confirmed cardiologist Dr. Elan Maor as the country's third Omicron case. Maor had previously attended the PCR London Valves 2021 conference at London's ExCeL London in late November 2021.

=== 2 December ===
United Arab Emirates announces its first cases. The number of cases in South Africa has increased exponentially in the prior two weeks, with Omicron rapidly becoming the dominant strain.

A case is found in the greater Paris, France region, reports BFM TV; the infected person had recently returned from Nigeria. This is the first case in mainland France. Iceland also reports its first case, a triply-vaccinated individual who had not traveled abroad; Greece announces its first case (in Crete), an individual who had traveled to South Africa. Finland reports its first case, an individual who had traveled from Sweden with a group.

Singapore preliminarily reports its first two cases. The US reports its second case (and its first case of community transmission) in a Minnesota resident who in late November had attended an anime convention in New York City, Anime NYC 2021; vaccination had been required for attendance. The event had 53,000 attendees, all of whom were urged to get tested (along with staff and exhibitors) inasmuch as authorities feared it as having been a superspreader event.

=== 3 December ===
Malaysia announced its first case of the variant. The case was detected on 26 November, a South African student entering the country to study at a private university. There are now ten cases in the US, in California, Colorado, Minnesota, and New York, and in Hawaii, where the person had no recent travel history. Réunion reported its second confirmed case. Both cases were linked to travel from mainland Africa. More than a dozen cases have been found in the US spread over at least ten states.

=== 4 December ===
- The official number of cases in South Korea is now nine (after the initial first three). Officials fear that a church gathering of hundreds on 28 November may have been a superspreader event. Concurrently the country is undergoing a record Delta surge.
- Officials in Norway officially regard a corporate Christmas party held on 26 November as a superspreader event, being the single largest outbreak outside of South Africa. At least 14 people of the 120 participants were infected. Ultimately 66 positive cases were identified, none of whom had received a booster.
- Israel confirms seven cases of the Omicron variant resulting from overseas travel including five from South Africa, one from Malawi, and one from the United Kingdom.

=== 5 December ===
Eight cases of community transmission, unrelated to each other, are reported in New York. A woman who recently traveled from South Africa becomes both New Jersey's and Georgia's first confirmed case. Maryland has its first three cases, and Pennsylvania and Missouri one each. Nebraska's number of cases increases to six, all in its southeast.

=== 6 December ===
Fiji confirmed its first two cases of the variant. The two cases traveled from Nigeria arriving in the country from Hong Kong on 25 November.

=== 7 December ===
The Omicron variant features as such for the first time in the overview of WHO's weekly operational update, namely "Supporting Omicron variant detection and COVID-19 response in southern Africa." As of 2 December, Botswana and South Africa have reported 19 and 172 Omicron variant cases, respectively, accounting for 62% of global cases. A surge team is being deployed. Globally, more than twenty countries have reported cases to date.

=== 8 December ===
Queensland, Australia health authorities detect the first case of the variant in the state, alongside the first identification ever of a genetically distinct 'Omicron-like' variant.

WHO announces that the variant had been detected in 57 countries. By this date, the CDC later confirms (on 17 December) that 22 states of the US have cases. "Among 43 cases with initial follow-up, one hospitalization and no deaths were reported."

Pakistan reports its first suspected case.

=== 9 December ===
WHO announces that "Of 899,935 Covid-19 test samples sequenced and uploaded to the global Covid database in the last 60 days, 897,886 (99.8%) were confirmed to be Delta, while 713 (0.1%) were Omicron." Cases in South Africa rise by 110% in one week. Cuba reports its first case, in a person who had traveled from Mozambique.

=== 10 December ===
Singapore detects its first case of community transmission, an airport frontline worker. In the US, more than 40 people have been found to be infected, more than 75% of whom had been vaccinated.

=== 11 December ===
Bangladesh reports its first two cases, female cricketers who had recently returned from Zimbabwe. In the US, the variant is responsible for 2.9% of cases.

=== 12 December ===
- 64 new cases are reported in New South Wales, Australia.
- Israel reports 20 new cases, bringing the total number of Omicron cases to 55.

=== 13 December ===
The first Briton infected with the Omicron variant dies; the variant now accounts for 20% of the cases in the UK. China reports its first case (a returnee from overseas), in Tianjin. Puerto Rico confirms its first case, as does Pakistan.

=== 14 December ===
France reports 130 cases. In England 20 cases are in hospital. Studies continue to show that while current vaccines are not as effective against Omicron that boosters are beneficial nevertheless.

Algeria reports its first case, a foreign national who entered Algeria on 10 December and tested positive at the Algiers International Airport.

Israel has confirmed a total of 67 Omicron cases.

=== 15 December ===
Mainland China reports its second case, a returnee who had landed at Shanghai International Airport. The individual had had multiple negative nucleic acid tests whilst in standard quarantine in Guangzhou until testing positive. Indicative of a relatively low viral load, this sequence of events prompted concerns over possible community transmission.

=== 16 December ===
Omicron is now extant in all six WHO regions

New Zealand confirmed its first case of the Omicron variant, an individual who arrived in Auckland from Germany via Dubai on 10 December.

Indonesia confirms its first case. Malaysia reports its second case, and Poland its first.

Fifteen people are hospitalized in the UK. The antibody treatment Evusheld produced by AstraZeneca is shown to retain neutralising activity against Omicron, whereas Regeneron's Ronapreve therapy proves to be less effective.

Despite there being few confirmed cases, wastewater samples in Orange County, Florida test nearly 100% for Omicron. Exactly six months after lifting its mask mandate, California reinstates it. The State of Palestine reported its first three cases, in returnees from abroad.

=== 17 December ===
New Zealand has reported three more Omicron cases at the border. These cases were had arrived in Auckland from Dubai on 11 December and traveled to a managed isolation and quarantine in Rotorua on a bus chartered for international arrivals.

In the US modeling by the CDC presented to state health leaders projects that Omicron will peak in January 2022, the case load having increased seven-fold in one week. How Omicron and Delta will interact is not clear in these models, however, and furthermore the prospect of those major variants on top of influenza is of grave concern. (A smaller Omicron surge in spring is also possible.) As it is, the variant is projected to become the dominant strain within a week.

The R number for Omicron in the UK is estimated to be between 3 and 5, Dr. Susan Hopkins, chief medical advisor at the UK Health Security Agency reported. The variant becomes the dominant strain in Scotland. In Denmark it accounts for one-fifth of all cases, and in Ireland 35%.

Qatar reports its first four cases, imported from abroad.

=== 18 December ===
- WHO reports that given community transmission the number of cases doubles every 1.5 to three days. The variant is now in 89 counties, and its severity profile remains unknown.
- Seven to ten percent of new confirmed coronavirus cases in France are suspected to be of the Omicron variant and the travel ban on the UK comes into force.
- Israel has reported 45 new cases, bringing the total number of Omicron cases to 134.
- Malaysia has confirmed 11 new cases of the Omicron variant, all resulting from overseas travel. These cases are connected to the 18 suspected cases dating back to 16 December.
- New Zealand has reported four new cases at the border, bringing the total number of Omicron cases in the country to eight.
- The Mayor of London Sadiq Khan, declares a major incident.
- In the United States, 80% of the COVID-19 cases in the Miami-Dade area (in Florida) are now of the Omicron variant, a situation regarded as "unprecedented". The first positive sample had been taken 2 December.

=== 19 December ===
- Netherlands enters lockdown, the first European country to do so due to Omicron. Iran announces its first case. The variant is now the dominant strain in Ontario, Canada, accounting for 51% of cases.

=== 20 December ===
- 12 deaths cumulative of Omicron cases in the UK. Thailand reports its first locally transmitted case. Peru reports its first four cases.
- Moderna announces that its mRNA-1273 "half-dose booster" elicits a 37-fold increase in antibodies compared with people who had received just two doses.
- CDC estimates that Omicron accounts for 73% of COVID-19 cases in the US, up from 3% the week prior. It has now been identified in at least 30 states.
- A report by the Imperial College COVID-19 Response Team based on data from England, found that "hospitalisation and asymptomatic infection indicators were not significantly associated with Omicron infection, suggesting at most limited changes in severity compared with Delta."

=== 24 December ===
Algeria reports its second confirmed case, concerns an Algerian national returning from a stay in South Africa.

=== 25 December ===
Airlines cancel more than 600 flights on Christmas Eve, and hundreds on Christmas, due to severe staffing shortages. United Airlines cancels 185 of its mainline flights, 10% of its schedule, and Deutsche Lufthansa AG's robust holiday contingency plans were overwhelmed by the unexpected rise in sick leave. Railroads in Europe were also affected, albeit not to the same extent. In the aggregate more than 4,500 flights worldwide are cancelled.

Portugal announces that on 22 December Omicron had become the dominant strain, accounting for 65.5% of cases, and Malaysia detects its first case. Also, the confirmed first case in Islamabad, the capital of Pakistan, is reported.

=== 26 December ===
Algeria has confirmed two new cases, in Algerian nationals returned from France and the United Kingdom.

Omicron is in at least 115 countries. The first cases are identified in Gaza Strip and Dominican Republic.

=== 27 December ===
Omicron becomes the dominant strain in Portugal.

=== 29 December ===
- CDC revises its Omicron estimate from comprising 73% to 59% of all COVID cases in the US.
- Thailand identifies its first superspreader event.
- New Zealand reports its first community case.

=== 30 December ===
Algeria reports 12 new cases; 6 Algerian citizens and 2 nationals returning from France, 1 Briton and 3 Mauritanians.

The second case of the Omicron variant has been confirmed in North Macedonia, in the town of Struga.

=== 31 December ===
Staffing shortages due to Omicron necessitates the temporary closure of numerous urgent care clinics in the US. The Biden administration lifts a month-long travel ban on foreign national arriving via air from eight African countries—South Africa, Botswana, Zimbabwe, Namibia, Lesotho, Eswatini, Mozambique and Malawi—effective 12:01 a.m. EST.

Dr Tedros Adhanom Ghebreyesus, WHO Director-General, notes in his year-end remarks that "Narrow nationalism and vaccine hoarding by some countries have undermined equity and created the ideal conditions for the emergence of the Omicron variant, and the longer inequity continues, the higher the risks of the virus evolving in ways we can't prevent or predict".

The UKHSA announced that as of 1 January 2022, Omicron would no longer be reported separately in the daily statistics because the variant of concern had become the dominant strain in England.

== January 2022 ==
=== January 1 ===
French Health officials acknowledged the Omicron variant as the country most dominant variant. President Macron warned that the following weeks would be "very difficult".

=== January 3 ===
South Korea reports the first two deaths of people who tested positive post mortem for Omicron.

=== January 4 ===
As per WHO, Omicron has emerged in 128 countries, and furthermore new studies suggest that it does not generally cause as severely pulmonary damage as prior variants.

US COVID-19 cases reach 1,082,549, mainly due to the rapidity of Omicron's spread.

A news article on Nature reports there are signals that Omicron does not multiply readily in lung tissue. The latest results could mean that "the virus establishes a very local infection in the upper airways and has less chance to go and wreak havoc in the lungs", which might make it easier "to hitch a ride on material expelled from the nose and mouth, allowing the virus to find new hosts".

=== January 6 ===
India records its first death, a 74-year-old diabetic man with other comorbidities.

=== January 7 ===
WHO announces that Omicron should not be described as "mild" given that the sheer scale of serious infections requiring hospitalization is overwhelming health systems worldwide. Britain deploys 200 military personnel to assist London hospitals, including 20 doctors.

Algeria detects 47 new cases; 29 cases from Algiers, 06 cases from Béjaïa, 01 cases from Bouïra, 11 cases from Constantine, bringing the total of confirmed cases to 63 cases.

=== January 9 ===
Mass testing begins in Tianjin, China, a major port city close to Beijing, after a cluster of twenty cases is discovered, of which at least two are of the Omicron variant.

=== January 10 ===
Peru register the highest rate of COVID-19 infections with 70,000 cases in a week, with Omicron variant being responsible for the third wave of infections.

=== January 12 ===
WHO projects that in six to eight weeks half the population of Europe will have caught the variant. In the US, 98% of COVID-19 cases the week prior were of the Omicron variant.

=== January 13 ===
Algeria detects 82 new cases; 61 cases from Algiers, 11 cases from Blida, 5 cases in Bouïra, 3 cases from Hassi Messaoud and 1 case in Aïn Defla and Laghouat, bringing the total of confirmed cases to 145 cases.

=== January 14 ===
US reported its peak number of infections by Omicron variant, US Presidential Chief Advisor, Anthony Fauci, predicted that the Omicron cases would drop by the end of January.

=== January 15 ===
Beijing reports its first locally transmitted case, in the Haidian district. Authorities have published a detailed account of the patient's activities dating back to 31 December, quarantined his workplace and residential compound, and collected 2,430 testing samples from these two locations.

=== January 17 ===
In China, health authorities said that their first ever recorded Omicron case could have come from a mail send from Canada. However, more than 16,500 tests of those who had contact or possible contact with the index case all came back negative.

=== January 19 ===
France reach 464,000 new COVID-19 cases with the Omicron variant rampant unabated, the country registered seven consecutive days surpassing daily 300,000 cases.

=== January 20 ===
The Pasteur Institute of Algeria (IPA) announced that it had recorded a total of 400 cases of the Omicron variant in Algeria, which represents 57% of the circulating variants.

=== January 27 ===
New Zealand has reported 34 new Omicron cases, bringing the total number of Omicron community cases to 90.

=== January 28 ===
New Zealand has reported 15 new Omicron cases, bringing the total number of Omicron community cases to 105.

== February 2022 ==
=== 8 February ===
Omicron is confirmed to be a zoonotic disease. In February 2022, the first confirmed case infecting a wild animal was confirmed by researchers at Pennsylvania State University in white-tailed deer in Staten Island, N.Y.

=== 24 February ===
The BA.2 subvariant accounts for more than a third of all cases globally.

== October 2022 ==
=== 13 October ===
The BA2.75.2 subvariant is observed to evade from neutralising antibodies in epidemiological samples.

== 2023 ==
On 9 January 2023 the European CDC said there was suggestive evidence the XBB.1.5 variant had a growth advantage; after becoming dominant in the US, it might become dominant in Europe in the following months.

== 2024 and later ==
==== 2024 ====
Late in April 2024, CDC data showed KP.2 to be the most common U.S. variant, with a quarter of all cases, just ahead of JN.1. KP1.1 represented 7 percent of U.S. cases. These two are sometimes referred to as the 'FLiRT' variants because they are characterized by a phenylalanine (F) to leucine (L) mutation and an arginine (R) to threonine (T) mutation in the virus's spike protein. By July 2024, a descendant of KP.2 with an extra amino acid change in the spike protein, Q493E, was given the names KP.3 and, informally, 'FLuQE,' and became a major variant in New South Wales during the Australian winter. Initial research suggested that the Q493E change could help KP.3 be more effective at binding to human cells than KP.2.

Early in August 2024, XEC was discovered in Germany. XEC is a recombination of two subvariants: KS.1.1 and KP.3.3. In early December 2024, CDC data showed XEC to be the most common U.S. variant, with 45% of all cases, ahead of KP3.1.1, which accounted for 24% of all cases.

==== 2025 ====
Late in January 2025, XFG (sometimes referred to as "Stratus") was discovered in Canada. XFG is a recombination of two subvariants: LF.7 and LP.8.1.2. In late May 2025, WHO reported that XFG was the 2nd most common variant globally, making up 22.7% of all global cases, behind NB.1.8.1 (named "Nimbus", often with extremely sore throat) with 24.9% of global cases, and closely followed by LP.8.1 accounting for 22.6% of global cases. In late June 2025, CDC estimate data shows XFG to be the 3rd most common U.S. variant, with 14% of all cases, behind NB.1.8.1 and LP.8.1, which account for 43% and 31% of all cases respectively.

On 14 September 2025, WHO listed JN.1 as a VOI; and KP.3.1.1, LP.8.1, NB.1.8.1, XEC, and XFG as VUMs. The estimated prevalence for the week ending 7 September 2025 was 68% for XFG (an increase compared to 61% for the week ending 10 August), 20% for NB.1.8.1 (a decrease compared to 24% for the week ending 10 August), and 4% or lower for the other four variants. In late September, the ECDC listed no VOCs, and listed BA.2.86 as a VOI, and NB.1.8.1 and XFG as VUMs.

==== 2026 ====
In late April, the ECDC again listed no VOCs, BA.2.86 as a VOI, and NB.1.8.1 and XFG as VUMs; and added BA.3.2, which had first been detected in South Africa in November 2024, as another VUM. In late August, the ECDC classification was unchanged from April, with no VOCs, BA.2.86 as a VOI, and NB.1.8.1, XFG, and BA.3.2 as VUMs. XFG was the dominant variant in the European area in both April and August.
