= Amandla =

Amandla may refer to:

- Amandla (power), a Xhosa and Zulu word meaning "power"

== Film ==
- Amandla!: A Revolution in Four-Part Harmony, a 2002 South African/American documentary film
- Amandla (film), a 2022 South African/Canadian film directed by Nerina De Jager

== Music ==
- Amandla (album), a 1989 album by Miles Davis
- Amandla Festival, a 1979 world music festival in Boston, Massachusetts, U.S.
- Amandla, an American music group fronted by Claude Coleman Jr.

== Other uses ==
- Amandla (magazine), a South African leftist magazine
- Amandla (novel), a 1980 novel by Miriam Tlali
- Amandla AIDS Fund, a charity established by Artists for a New South Africa in 2003
- Amandla Stenberg (born 1998), American actress

== See also ==
- Amandala, a Belizean newspaper
