= Amanda Weltman =

South African theoretical physicist

- Born: 1979 (age 46–47); Cape Cod, Massachusetts, United States
- Occupation: Physicist
- Known for: Proposing "chameleon theory" explaining dark energy

Amanda Weltman (born 1979) is a South African theoretical physicist. She co-authored a series of papers proposing "chameleon gravity" to explain the existence of dark energy. She is a professor and South African Research Chair at the University of Cape Town.

== Education and early research ==
Amanda Weltman was drawn to physics while she was an undergraduate student at the University of Cape Town. Describing her attraction to being a physicist, she stated that "understanding the way the Universe worked was just about the coolest job anyone could have."

In 2007, Weltman completed her Ph.D. in theoretical physics at Columbia University in New York. She was supervised by theoretical physicist Brian Greene. She also did post-doctoral research at the University of Cambridge as part of the Centre for Theoretical Cosmology founded by physicist Stephen Hawking.

== Personal life ==
Weltman was born in 1979 in Cape Cod, Massachusetts, and moved to South Africa with her parents when she was two months old. She spent her childhood in Johannesburg and Cape Town. She was a competitive gymnast as a child.

As of 2013, she lives with her husband, Jeff Murugan, who is a string theorist at the same university. They met in 1997 and have three children. She has stated that she was glad to be brought up in a family largely uninfluenced by gender stereotypes, noting that exposure to gender stereotypes in adolescence is frequently a barrier for young girls from pursuing science.

== Research and career ==
Weltman became known when she co-authored a 2004 paper titled "Chameleon Cosmology" with Justin Khoury, which proposed a theory to explain dark energy. She was a 24-year-old graduate student at Columbia University at the time. Dark energy is proposed as an explanation for the accelerating expansion of the universe. Khoury and Weltman proposed the existence of a new force that drove this expansion, which changed depending on the environment it was in. It would be weak when particles were densely packed together, and strong when they were far apart. Thus, the theory suggests that in regions where matter is relatively dense, the chameleon force is difficult to detect, but in empty regions of space, it acts to push bodies apart and expand the universe.

The theory of chameleon gravity can be tested in a range of environments including in laboratory tests. The first searches for dark energy in the laboratory were performed as searches for chameleons. In 2007, Weltman joined an experimental team at Fermilab on the GammeV experiment which has been designed to search for axion-like particles. The first bounds on chameleon gravity parameters were placed by this experiment in 2008. The experiment was redesigned and rebuilt as a purpose built chameleon detector, the GammeV CHASE (Chameleon Afterglow Search Experiment), with first results constraining chameleon dark energy in 2010. These were the first experiments of their kind and were able to place the first direct experimental bounds on the theory. This work pioneered a new subfield of laboratory experiments searching for chameleon gravity, or dark energy more broadly, in the laboratory.

== Awards and distinctions ==
- National Women in Science award for the Best Emerging Young Researcher in the Natural Sciences and Engineering, in 2009
- Meiring Naude Medal from the Royal Society of South Africa, in 2011
- NSTF-BHP Billiton, TW Kambule Award
- Silver Jubilee medal from the South African Institute of Physics
- The University of Cape Town Faculty of Science Young Researcher award, in 2010
- The College of Fellows Young Researcher award, in 2010
- Inaugural Next Einstein Fellow Laureate, in 2016–2017
- South African Research Chair Award 2016–2020 Tier 2, 2021–2025 Tier 1
