= Shabir Madhi =

South African physician and professor

Shabir Ahmed Madhi CBE
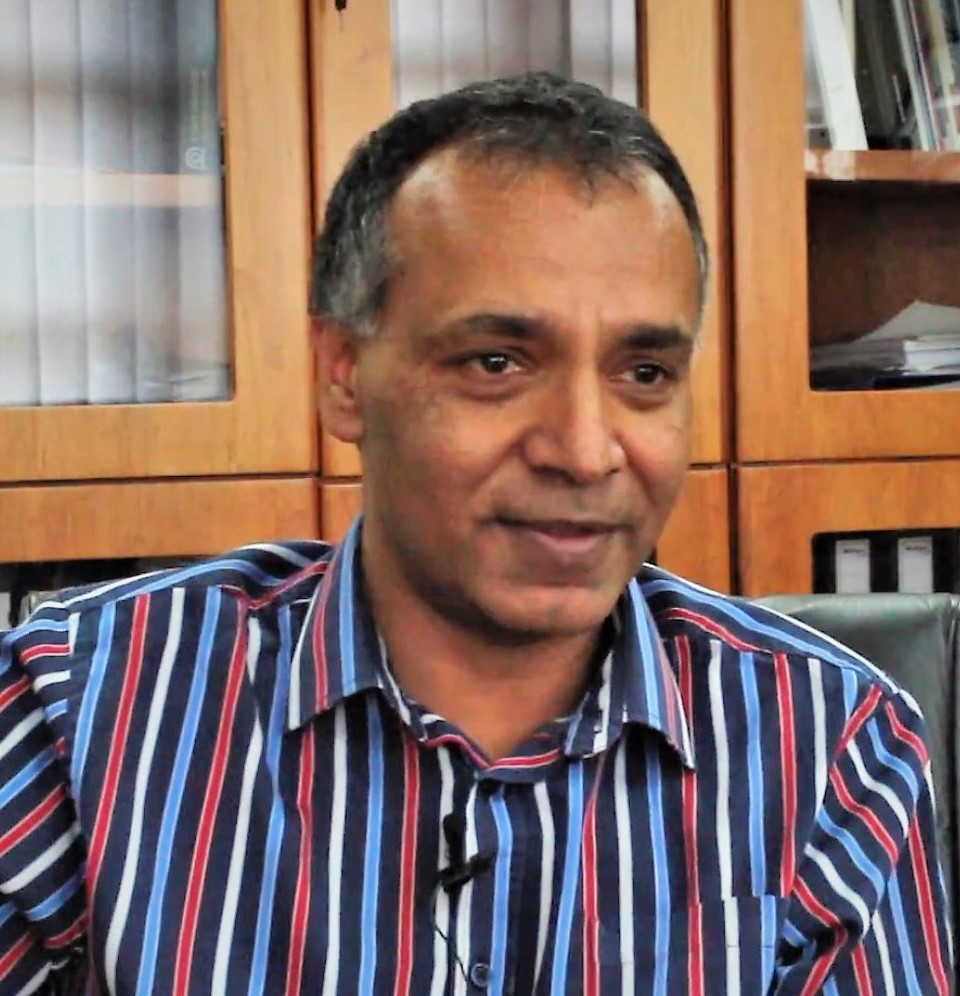
- Madhi in 2017
- Born: 1966 (age 59–60)
- Education: University of the Witwatersrand, Johannesburg
- Known for: Leading COVID-19 vaccine trials in South Africa
- Medical career
- Profession: Physician
- Sub-specialties: Vaccinology

Shabir Ahmed Madhi, CBE (born 1966) is a South African physician who is professor of vaccinology and director of the South African Medical Research Council Respiratory and Meningeal Pathogens Research Unit at the University of the Witwatersrand, and National Research Foundation/Department of Science and Technology Research Chair in Vaccine Preventable Diseases. In January 2021, he was appointed Dean of the Faculty of Health Sciences at the University of the Witwatersrand.

Madhi was executive director of South Africa's National Institute for Communicable Diseases from 2011 to 2017, and has served on several WHO committees in roles pertinent to vaccines and pneumonia. In 2018, he co-founded the African Leadership in Vaccinology Expertise (ALIVE) and was appointed Chair of South Africa's National Advisory Group on Immunization (NAGI). His research has included studies on the pneumococcal conjugate vaccine and rotavirus vaccine, and in pregnant women, the influenza and respiratory syncytial virus vaccines.

Since the global COVID-19 pandemic in 2020, Madhi has been leading COVID-19 vaccine trials in South Africa, including the first in Africa. In 2021 he stated that the first and foremost method of ending COVID-19 in South Africa is to implement a mass vaccination programme.

== Early life and education ==
Madhi was born in 1966. His father was a teacher and mother a housewife. Initially aspiring to becoming an engineer, he opted to accept a bursary to study medicine and was initially reluctant to persist with his medical education. In 1990 he completed his undergraduate and postgraduate training at the University of the Witwatersrand, Johannesburg, and six years later, became a fellow of the College of Paediatrics (FCPaeds (SA)). During this time, with encouragement from Glenda Gray, he applied for a post under professor Keith Klugman, to work on vaccines for pneumonia.

In 1998 he received a master's degree in medicine (paediatrics). He gained his PhD in 2003.

== Career ==
Madhi is professor of vaccinology and director of the South African Medical Research Council Respiratory and Meningeal Pathogens Research Unit at the University of the Witwatersrand, and National Research Foundation/Department of Science and Technology Research Chair in Vaccine Preventable Diseases. These units have been rebranded as the MRC Vaccines and Infectious Diseases Analytics Research Unit (VIDA).

He was executive director of South Africa's National Institute for Communicable Diseases from 2011 to 2017, and has served on several WHO committees in roles pertinent to vaccines and pneumonia. In 2018, after spending four years as deputy-chair of South Africa's National Advisory Group on Immunization (NAGI), he became its chairperson. In the same year he co-founded the African Leadership in Vaccinology Expertise (ALIVE), based at the University of the Witwatersrand, with the aim of expanding expertise in vaccinology in Africa. In January 2021, he became Dean of the Faculty of Health Sciences of the University of the Witwateratand.

=== Pneumonia vaccine ===
His research has included studies on the pneumococcal conjugate vaccine. This research led to the WHO recommendations on the delivery of this vaccine in low and middle-income countries.

=== Rotavirus vaccine ===
Madhi led the first study that showed that a rotavirus vaccine could significantly prevent severe diarrhoea due to rotavirus during the first year of life in African babies. It was published in The New England Journal of Medicine in 2010. The paper provided one of the key pieces of evidence for the WHO recommendations of universal rotavirus vaccination.

=== Flu vaccine ===
In pregnant women, he studied the effectiveness of influenza and respiratory syncytial virus vaccines. He led one of the largest studies evaluating the immune response to influenza vaccination in pregnant women. His work showed that the risk of flu halved in women given the flu vaccine. In addition, the risk to their newborns in the first 24 weeks of life was also reduced. The findings were presented at the 16th International Congress on Infectious Diseases and he reported that his "data support the recent WHO recommendation in terms of prioritizing pregnant women for influenza vaccination, not just for the protection of the mother, but protection of the infant as well". Later, he became involved in the clinical development of a vaccine against Group B streptococcus for pregnant women.

=== Tuberculosis ===
Other research has involved assessing the efficacy of various drug regimens to prevent tuberculosis (TB) in people with HIV.

=== COVID-19 ===
Since the global COVID-19 pandemic in 2020, he has been leading COVID-19 vaccine trials in South Africa, including the Novavax COVID-19 vaccine and the Oxford-AstraZeneca vaccine, the first COVID-19 vaccine clinical trial in the continent of Africa. Asserting that South Africa's second wave in December 2020 is largely driven by mass gatherings and changing people's behaviour, rather than solely on the new variant, he has called for a wider coverage of COVID-19 vaccination. His co-authored publication on results of a large clinical trial of a COVID-19 vaccine suggest that the vaccine is safe and effective. In 2021 he made it clear that the first and foremost method of ending COVID-19 in South Africa is to implement a mass vaccination programme. On 1 January 2021 he tweeted "Ability of vaccines to impact on the pandemic is directly related to how soon you can get approx 50–60% of the population vaccinated."

== Awards and honours ==
Since 2012, he has been considered an internationally recognised scientist with an A-rating by the South Africa's National Research Foundation. In 2014 he received the Platinum Medal, South African Medical Research Council's life-time award. In 2016 he received the European Developing Clinical Trial Partnership Scientific Award.

In 2023 he was made an Honorary Commander of the Order of the British Empire (CBE) from British Government for services to science and public health in a global pandemic.

== Selected publications ==
Madhi has authored more than 350 publications between 1997 and 2018, covering topics such as childhood vaccines, pneumonia, severe infections in young children and vaccination in pregnancy.

=== Articles ===
- Madhi, Shabir A.; Cunliffe, Nigel A.; Steele, Duncan; Witte, Desirée; Kirsten, Mari; Louw, Cheryl; Ngwira, Bagrey; Victor, John C.; Gillard, Paul H.; Cheuvart, Brigitte B.; Han, Htay H.; Neuzil, Kathleen M. (28 January 2010). "Effect of Human Rotavirus Vaccine on Severe Diarrhea in African Infants". New England Journal of Medicine. 362 (4): 289–298. doi:10.1056/NEJMoa0904797. ISSN 0028-4793. PMC 5117000. PMID 20107214. (Lead author)
- Madhi, S.A. (January 2008). "Introduction of the pneumococcal conjugate vaccine into the South African public immunisation programme: dawn of a new era?". Southern African Journal of Epidemiology and Infection. 23 (4): 5–9. doi:10.1080/10158782.2008.11441325. ISSN 1015-8782.
- Madhi, Shabir A.; Cutland, Clare L.; Kuwanda, Locadiah; Weinberg, Adriana; Hugo, Andrea; Jones, Stephanie; Adrian, Peter V.; Van Niekerk, Nadia; Treurnicht, Florette; Ortiz, Justin R.; Venter, Marietjie; Violari, Avy; Neuzil, Kathleen M.; Simões, Eric A.F.; Klugman, Keith P.; Nunes, Marta C.; Maternal Flu Trial (Matflu) Team (4 September 2014). "Influenza Vaccination of Pregnant Women and Protection of Their Infants". New England Journal of Medicine. 371 (10): 918–931. doi:10.1056/NEJMoa1401480. hdl:2263/42412. ISSN 0028-4793. PMID 25184864. (Co-author)
- Moïsi, J.; Madhi, S. A.; Rees, H. (2019). "Vaccinology in sub-Saharan Africa". BMJ Global Health. 4 (5) e001363. doi:10.1136/bmjgh-2018-001363. ISSN 2059-7908. PMC 6768329. PMID 31637022. (Co-author)
- Voysey, Merryn; et al. (9 January 2021). "Safety and efficacy of the ChAdOx1 nCoV-19 vaccine (AZD1222) against SARS-CoV-2: an interim analysis of four randomised controlled trials in Brazil, South Africa, and the UK". The Lancet. 397 (10269): 99–111. doi:10.1016/S0140-6736(20)32661-1. ISSN 0140-6736. PMC 7723445. PMID 33306989. (Co-author)
