= Pumla Dineo Gqola =

South African academic and feminist (born 1972)

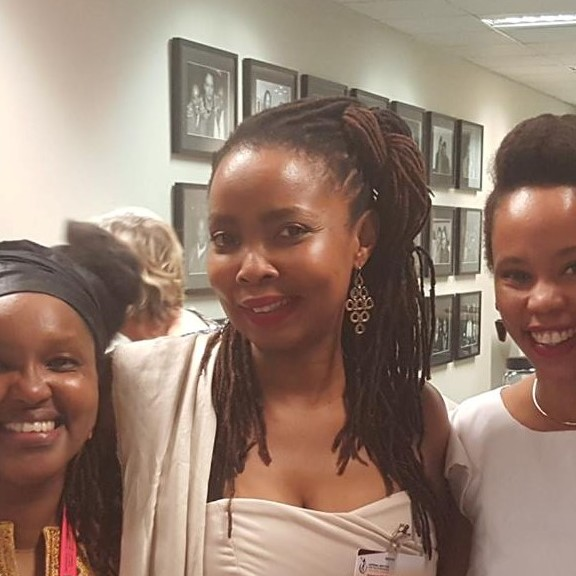
- Gqola at the National Institute for the Humanities and Social Sciences in 2015
- Born: 3 December 1972 (age 53)
- Occupations: Academic, writer, feminist
- Awards: Alan Paton Award (2016)

Academic background
- Education: University of Cape Town (MA); University of Warwick (MA); LMU Munich (DPhil)

Academic work
- Discipline: Literature
- Sub-discipline: Postcolonial literature, African literature, African feminism
- Institutions: Nelson Mandela University

Pumla Dineo Gqola (born 3 December 1972) is a South African academic, writer, and feminist, best known for her 2015 book Rape: A South African Nightmare, which won the 2016 Alan Paton Award, and Female Fear Factory, which won the 2022 Best Non-Fiction Monograph Award from the South African National Institute for Humanities and Social Sciences (NIHSS). Pumla Dineo Gqola is also the recipient of the German Falling Walls Foundation 2023 Breakthrough Award in Humanities and Social Sciences and the CANEX Prize for Publishing in Africa. In addition, she was awarded the Ruth First Fellowship by the University of the Witwatersrand in 2016 and the Black Feminisms and the Polycrisis Fellowship by The New Institute in Hamburg in 2024.

She is a professor of literature at Nelson Mandela University, where she holds the South African Research Chair in African Feminist Imagination.

== Education and career ==
Gqola was born on born 3 December 1972 and grew up in Alice in the Eastern Cape of South Africa. She has a BA(Hons) and MA from the University of Cape Town, an MA from the University of Warwick, and a DPhil in postcolonial studies from LMU Munich.

She worked at the University of the Free State from 1997 to 2005, and from 2007 to 2017 she was attached to the University of the Witwatersrand, where she was associate professor, and later full professor, in literary, media and gender studies at the School of Literature and Language Studies. In 2018, she was appointed Dean of Research at the University of Fort Hare. In 2019, she was appointed to the Department of Higher Education Ministerial Task Team responsible for advising on gender-based violence in South African universities. She has also been Chief Research Specialist at the Human Sciences Research Council.

She was an inaugural Chair of Judges of Etisalat Prize for Literature (alongside Billy Kahora, Dele Olojede, Ellah Wakatama, Kole Omotoso and Margaret Busby), launched in 2013 to celebrate first-time African writers of published books of fiction.

In May 2020, she joined the Centre for Women and Gender Studies at Nelson Mandela University, where she is a professor in literature, specialising in African and postcolonial literature, African feminism, and slave memory. In late 2020, she was awarded a National Research Foundation Research Chair in African Feminist Imagination, dedicated to interdisciplinary gender scholarship. Her articles for public audiences have appeared in publications including the New Frame and the New York Times.

== Works ==
Gqola's first book, What is Slavery to Me?: Postcolonial/Slave Memory in Post-Apartheid South Africa (2010) is an academic, interdisciplinary study of slave memory in South Africa and its significance for contemporary gender and race dynamics. It was longlisted for the 2011 Alan Paton Award. A Renegade Called Simphiwe (2013) is about South African singer Simphiwe Dana, and combines biography with cultural analysis.

Gqola is best known for her two books about rape culture – Rape: A South African Nightmare (2015) and Female Fear Factory: Gender and Patriarchy under Racial Capitalism (2021). She has also published a collection of essays, Reflecting Rogue: Inside the Mind of a Feminist (2018), which was favourably received and longlisted for the 2018 Alan Paton Award.

=== Rape: A South African Nightmare ===
In Rape (2015), written for public audiences, Gqola examines the history, workings, and social functions of sexual violence in South Africa. She argues that rape is an act of power and violence, rather than a sex act, and in South Africa is normalised and legitimised by various social norms, images, and attitudes. Gqola introduces the notion of the "female fear factory," also the subject of her most recent book, Female Fear Factory (2021), to refer to the social discourses with she claims regulate women's behaviour through "the manufacture of female fear," especially by the subtle but ubiquitous assertion of male ownership over their bodies. She argues that these discourses are strengthened by the public prominence of hyper-masculine figures such as Jacob Zuma, Julius Malema, Kenny Kunene, and Oscar Pistorius, and she dedicates a chapter to analysing the public and media response to the Jacob Zuma rape trial of 2005–06.

Rape received positive reviews, with the Daily Maverick calling it "brilliant and distressing." It won the 2016 Alan Paton Award. Chair of Judges Achmat Dangor said it was "fearless" and "nuanced and cogently argued".

=== Female Fear Factory ===
In Female Fear Factory (2019), Gqola explores in detail how female fear is created and maintained around the world by patriarchal cultures in order to control women and other marginalised groups. Her core argument to address the "female fear factory" is confrontation, to “refuse to keep quiet when trivialisation happens in front of us in public” as this “make[s] more cracks in patriarchy’s manufacture of female fear”. Female Fear Factory received positive reviews, with fellow academic Jamie Martin labelling it a "timely and critical contribution" to South African feminist thinking.

== Awards and honours ==
- The 2016 Ruth First Fellowship at the University of Witwatersrand
- The 2016 Alan Paton Award for Rape: A South African Nightmare
- The 2018 University of Cape Town President of Convocation Award
- The 2022 HSS Best Non-Fiction Monograph Award from the South African National Institute for Humanities and Social Sciences (NIHSS) for Female Fear Factory
- The 2022 Brittle Paper Academic of the Year Award
- The 2023 German Falling Walls Foundation Breakthrough Award in Humanities and Social Sciences
- The 2023 DLitt (honoris causa) from the University of Stellenbosch
- The 2024 Fellowship in Black Feminism and the Polycrisis from The New Institute
- The 2024 CANEX Prize for Publishing in Africa

== Bibliography ==
=== Books ===
- What is Slavery to Me?: Postcolonial/Slave Memory in Post-Apartheid South Africa. Johannesburg: Wits University Press, 2010. ISBN 978-1-86814-692-5.
- A Renegade Called Simphiwe. Johannesburg: MFBooks, 2013. ISBN 978-1-920601-08-9.
- Rape: A South African Nightmare. Johannesburg: MF Books, 2015. ISBN 978-1920601522
- Reflecting Rogue: Inside the Mind of a Feminist. Johannesburg: Jacana Media, 2018. ISBN 978-1-920601-87-4.
- Female Fear Factory: Gender and Patriarchy under Racial Capitalism. La Vergne: Melinda Ferguson Books, 2021. ISBN 978-1-990973-10-9.

=== As editor ===
- Miriam Tlali, Writing Freedom. Cape Town: HSRC Press, 2021. ISBN 0-7969-2562-3.

=== Selected articles ===
- "Homeland banter." In Running Towards Us: New Writing from South Africa (ed. Isabel Balseiro). Portsmouth: Heinemann, 2000. ISBN 0-325-00231-2.
- "Ufanele uqavile: blackwomen, feminisms and postcoloniality in Africa." Agenda: Empowering Women for Gender Equity (50): 11–22, 2001. ISSN 1013-0950. JSTOR 4066402
- "Language and power, languages of power: a black woman's journey through three South African universities." In Hear Our Voices: Race, Gender and the Status of Black South African Women in the Academy (ed. Reitumetse Obakeng Mabokela and Zine Magubane). Pretoria: UNISA, 2004. ISBN 1-86888-294-2.
- "How the 'cult of femininity' and violent masculinities support endemic gender based violence in contemporary South Africa." African Identities. 5(1): 111–124, 2007. doi:10.1080/14725840701253894. ISSN 1472-5843.
- "Brutal inheritances: echoes, negrophobia and masculinist violence." In Go Home or Die Here: Violence, Xenophobia and the Reinvention of Difference in South Africa (ed. Shireen Hassim). Johannesburg: Wits University Press, 2008. ISBN 978-1-86814-487-7.
- "The status of women in Africa: a reflection on patterns and eruptions." In Gender Instruments in Africa: Consolidating Gains in the Southern African Development Community (ed. Michele Ruiters). Midrand: Institute for Global Dialogue, 2008. ISBN 1-920216-08-1.
- "'The difficult task of normalizing freedom': spectacular masculinities, Ndebele's literary/cultural commentary and post-Apartheid life." English in Africa. 36(1): 61–76, 2009. JSTOR 40239124. ISSN 0376-8902.
- "Unconquered and insubordinate: embracing black feminist intellectual activist legacies." In Becoming Worthy Ancestors: Archive, Public Deliberation and Identity in South Africa (ed. Xolela Mangcu). Johannesburg: Wits University Press, 2011. ISBN 978-1-86814-557-7.
- "a playful but also very serious love letter to gabrielle goliath." In Surfacing: On Being Black and Feminist in South Africa (ed. Desiree Lewis and Gabeba Baderoon). Johannesburg: Wits University Press, 2021. ISBN 1-77614-610-7.
