= African Leadership in Vaccinology Expertise =

- Abbreviation: ALIVE
- Formation: 2016
- Founded at: University of Witwatersrand, Johannesburg
- Purpose: "To create African expertise and leadership in vaccinology research and advocacy to significantly reduce vaccine preventable diseases over the next 15 years."
- Location: South Africa
- Co-director: Shabir Madhi
- Co-director: Helen Rees
- Scientific co-ordinator: Clare Cutland
- Website: Official website

African Leadership in Vaccinology Expertise (ALIVE) is a South African Department of Science and Technology/National Research Foundation Flagship Initiative at the University of Witwatersrand, Johannesburg, established in 2016. It was co-founded by professors of vaccinology Helen Rees and Shabir Madhi and runs an 18-month Master of Science in Medicine in the field of Vaccinology. Its members have been contributing to COVID-19 vaccine trials in South Africa during the COVID-19 pandemic.
