= Fiona Tregenna =

South African economist

- Occupations: Professor at the University of Johannesburg and Director at UNU-MERIT

Academic background
- Education: University of Cambridge (PhD)

Academic work
- Discipline: Economics
- Sub-discipline: Industrial organisation, industrial development
- Main interests: Deindustrialisation, structural change, industrial policy, heterodox and Marxian economics

Fiona Tregenna is a South African economist who is professor of economics at the University of Johannesburg and Director at UNU-MERIT in the Netherlands. She holds the South African Research Chair in industrial development. She has been a member of the South African Competition Tribunal since 2013 and served on President Cyril Ramaphosa's Presidential Economic Advisory Council.

Tregenna's primary research interest is industrial development, especially structural change and deindustrialisation. She has also published on other topics in industrial organisation and competition economics, as well as on inequality and unemployment.

== Academic background and positions ==
Tregenna completed undergraduate degrees at the University of the Witwatersrand and University of Natal. She has a master's in economics from the University of Massachusetts and a PhD in economics from the University of Cambridge.

In January 2016, she took office as South African Research Chair (SARChl) in industrial development. The SARChl has its own research programme at the University of Johannesburg, funded by the Department of Science and Technology and administered by the National Research Foundation, and is renewable until 2031. Tregenna is also a professor economics at the University of Johannesburg and a member of the Academy of Science of South Africa. In January 2026, she took office as Director of UNU-MERIT in the Netherlands

== Public service ==
In 2014, Premier David Makhura appointed Tregenna to a 15-member panel established to assess Gauteng's unpopular eTolls; in 2017, Makhura appointed her to a broader initiative, a 14-member provincial economic advisory panel chaired by Jabu Moleketi. In the 2019 State of the Nation address, President Cyril Ramaphosa announced the establishment of a similar economic advisory panel at the national level, the Presidential Economic Advisory Council, and Tregenna was appointed as one of its 18 members.

In addition to industrial policy, Tregenna has contributed to competition policy; she took part in the NEDLAC negotiations over the Competition Act of 1998 and is a member of the Competition Tribunal. She was appointed as a part-time member of the tribunal in September 2013 and was appointed to a second term in April 2019.

Tregenna formerly worked at the parliamentary office of the Congress of South African Trade Unions, and she was a member of the South African Communist Party (SACP), gaining election to the SACP Central Committee in 2012.
