= Caroline Tiemessen =

Virologist and researcher

- Education: University of the Witwatersrand
- Known for: HIV research
- Scientific career
- Workplaces: National Institute for Communicable Diseases; University of the Witwatersrand
- Thesis: The Defectiveness of the Subgroup F Adenoviruses in vitro (1992)

Caroline Tiemessen is a virologist and researcher involved in HIV related research. She heads the Cell Biology Research Laboratory within the Centre for HIV and STIs at the National Institute for Communicable Diseases and is a research Professor in the School of Pathology at the University of the Witwatersrand (WITS). Her research interests include the study of HIV vaccines and the search for an HIV cure in both children and adults. In 2018 she was part of the research team involved with the transplantation of a liver from an HIV-positive woman to her HIV-negative child.

== Education and career ==
As a young child, Tiemessen had a general interest in Science and was planning to become a geologist. However, the concept of mutation in micro-organisms, as taught to her in Grade 11, awoke her interest in biological sciences. While interested in medicine, her fear of needles precluded that avenue of study. Tiemessen went on to do a BSc at the University of the Witwatersrand and she completed her PhD in Virology there in 1992 with a thesis, presented to the Faculty of Medicine, entitled "The Defectiveness of the Subgroup F Adenoviruses in vitro".

She then spent three months in Israel studying blood dendritic cells and cytokines with Yechiel Becker and on her return to South Africa joined the National Institute of Virology (now the National Institute for Communicable Diseases (NICD)). Caroline Tiemessen heads the Cell Biology Research Laboratory within the Centre for HIV and STIs at the NICD and is a research Professor in the School of Pathology at the University of the Witwatersrand.

In 2005, Tiemessen was awarded a Wellcome Trust International Senior Research Fellowship for 5 years to study protective immunity in the context of maternal-infant HIV-1 transmission. Tiemessen and her colleague Patrick Arbuthnot presented some of their research findings at the 6th Wits Faculty of Health Sciences Prestigious Research Lecture in November 2011, entitled "From target discovery to novel treatment for HIV-1". The research focused on both natural and acquired HIV immunity and how gene-manipulation could be used to achieve that.

In 2013 she was awarded the DST/NRF Research Chair of HIV Vaccine Translational Research in the Faculty of Health Sciences at the University of the Witwatersrand.

== Research ==
Tiemessen's research interests include the study of HIV vaccines and the search for an HIV cure in both children and adults. A major focus of her research is natural resistance models which include investigations of mother-to-child HIV-1 transmission and adult transmission models. Her laboratory was involved in studies on the effects of very early anti-retroviral treatment on the establishment and maintenance of the HIV viral reservoir in infants, including a study completed in April 2020 in which Nevirapine, Zidovudine, Lamivudine and other drugs were tested.

She lists the substantial contributions that the NICD has made to the understanding of mother-to-child transmissions of HIV as amongst her greatest achievements. Of particular interest have been the cases where children have gained immunity or resistance to HIV after shortened courses of anti-retroviral treatment.

== Recognition ==
- In 2013 Tiemessen was appointed a member of the Academy of Science of South Africa.
- WITS awarded her the Vice Chancellor's Research Award in 2018.
- In 2018 she was part of the group awarded the Innovation Award by the Congress of Business and Economics
- In 2019 Tiemessen was awarded the Scientific Merit Award Gold medal by the South African Medical Research Council
