= UNU-MERIT =

Research and training institute in Maastricht

United Nations University - Maastricht Economic and Social Research Institute on Innovation and Technology (UNU-MERIT)
- Formation: 2006; 20 years ago
- Type: Research Institute
- Headquarters: Maastricht, the Netherlands
- Director: Prof. Dr. Fiona Tregenna
- Parent organization: United Nations; United Nations University
- Website: unu.edu/merit

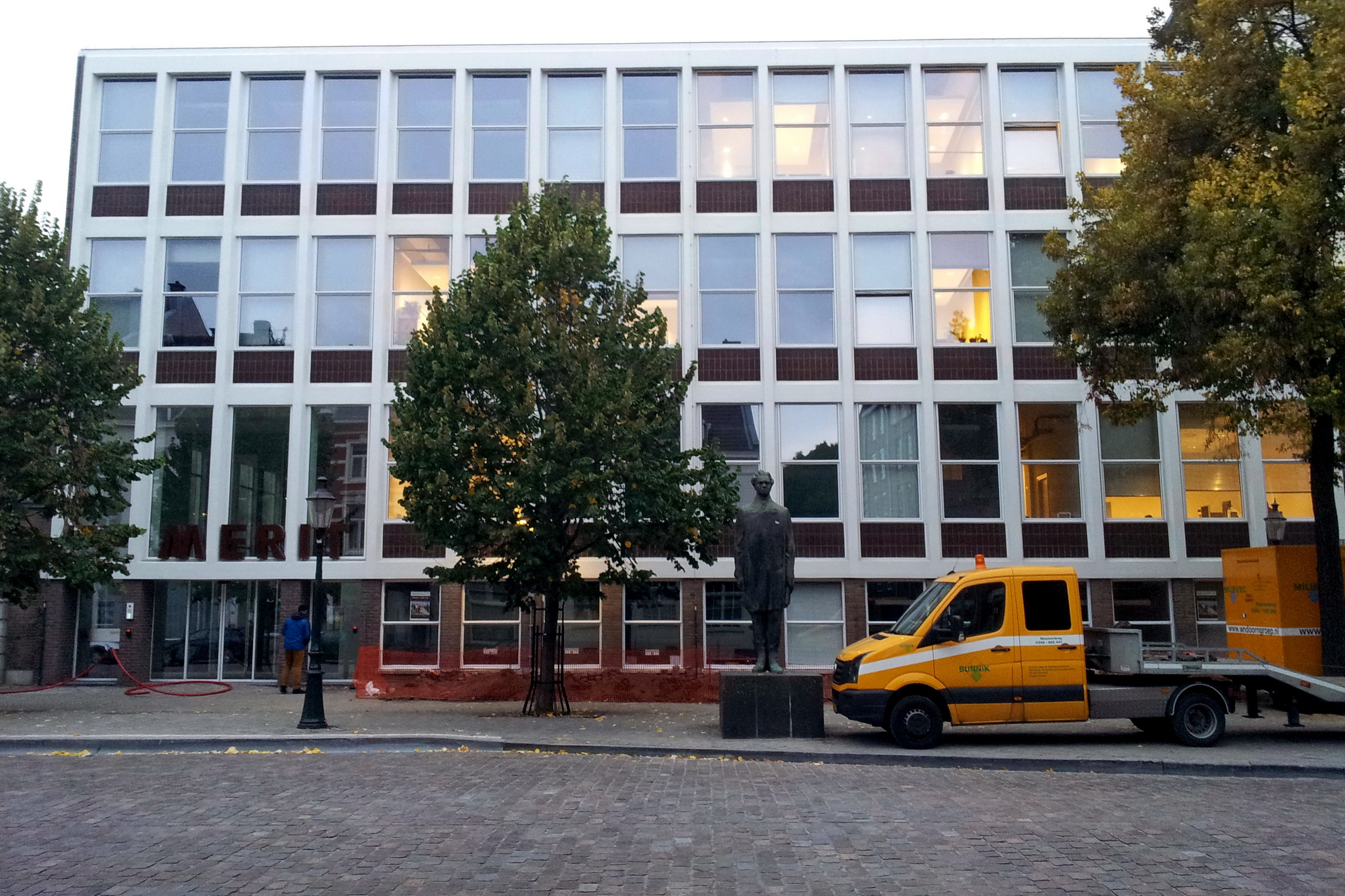
The new building at Boschstraat. In the foreground the statue of Petrus Regout, the 19th-century founder of the Maastricht potteries

The United Nations University - Maastricht Economic and Social Research Institute on Innovation and Technology (UNU-MERIT) is a joint research and training institute of the United Nations University and Maastricht University, with both parent institutions supplying staff. UNU-MERIT is based in Maastricht, in the southeastern part of the Netherlands.

The institute explores the social, political and economic factors that drive technological innovation, with a particular focus on creation, diffusion and access to knowledge.

In August 2022, UNU-MERIT scored third in the RePEc list of world top academic institutions in the field of economic innovation publications.

== History ==
The Institute was established in 2006 as an integration of the United Nations University Institute for New Technologies (UNU-INTECH) and the MERIT institute at Maastricht University. In 1985 the Dutch Government commissioned Prof Dr Charles Cooper to draft a feasibility study on the creation of a UNU Institute to specialize in the social and economic aspects of new technologies, with a focus on developing nations. The report was presented to UNU in 1987 and formed the basis for setting up the new Institute in 1990. Prof Cooper led UNU-INTECH from 1990 until 2000. He was succeeded by Prof Dr Lynn Mytelka (2000-2004).

In 2004, Prof Dr Luc Soete became director of UNU-INTECH, with the task to integrate UNU-INTECH and the MERIT institute of which he already was director. Prof Soete had established MERIT at the Faculty of Economics and Business of Maastricht University in 1988, and was its director until the integration with UNU-INTECH. Like UNU-INTECH, MERIT's work was concerned with the economic impact of new technology, but its focus was mostly on developed nations. Prof Soete was succeeded as director of UNU-MERIT by Prof Dr Bart Verspagen (2012-2020) and later by Prof. Dr. Bartel Van de Walle (2020-2024). Prof. Dr. Clemens Kool served as interim Director from 2024-2025. The current director is Prof.Dr. Fiona Tregenna

Following the integration of the Maastricht Graduate School of Governance (MGSoG) in December 2010, the institute now covers all aspects of governance in domestic and global organizations, from risk assessment to policy analysis, design and evaluation. In its enlarged form, UNU-MERIT functions as a research centre and graduate school. The Institute offers a dual MSc in Public Policy & Human Development with four different specializations. UNU-MERIT is a 'UN think tank' addressing a broad range of policy questions on comprehensive innovation for sustainable development.

The institute was based in a historic building in the centre of Maastricht near the city's main square, the Vrijthof till August 2015. In September 2015 the institute moved to a new location in Boschstraat in the newly developed Sphinx Quarter.

== PhD Programmes ==
The Institute has two PhD Programmes. The full-time programme allows candidates to conduct independent research on Innovation, Economics and Governance for Development. The Dual Career Training Programme to obtain a PhD in Governance and Policy Analysis (GPAC²) allows external PhD candidates to devote part of their working time to scientific research whilst continuing their full-time employment.

== Master in Public Policy & Human Development ==
UNU-MERIT, in partnership with Maastricht University, offers a Master of Science in Public Policy & Human Development (MPP). The programme awards a double degree, one from each partner University. The MPP is accredited by the Accreditation Organisation of the Netherlands and Flanders (NVAO) and received the official EAPAA accreditation by the European Association for Public Administration Accreditation. The Programme has four specializations which are offered in collaboration with partner universities and international organisations

== Wikipedia General Survey ==
In January 2008, the Wikimedia Foundation announced plans to conduct a general survey of all Wikipedians. They hired the Collaborative Creativity Group of UNU-MERIT for the job, which published preliminary results in April 2009. Though initially intended to track reasons for editor decline, an unexpected result of the study was to uncover a significant difference between the number of male editors versus the number of female editors. Though this was first definitely established with the 2011 editor survey, the UNU-MERIT survey can be seen as the first signal of Wikipedia's Gendergap.
