= Miriam Tlali =

South African novelist (1933–2017)

- Born: Miriam Masoli Tlali; 11 November 1933; Doornfontein, Johannesburg, South Africa
- Died: 24 February 2017 (aged 83); Doornfontein, Johannesburg, South Africa
- Other name: Miriam Masoli Tlali-Lehutso
- Education: University of the Witwatersrand; National University of Lesotho
- Occupation: Writer/Researcher/Publisher
- Known for: First black woman in South Africa to publish a novel
- Notable work: Muriel at Metropolitan (1975; as Between Two Worlds, 1979); Amandla (1980)
- Spouse: Stephen Lehutso
- Children: 2
- Awards: Order of Ikhamanga – Silver (2008)

Miriam Tlali (11 November 1933 – 24 February 2017) was a South African novelist. She was the first black woman in South Africa to publish an English-language novel, Muriel at Metropolitan, in 1975 (later issued under her preferred title, Between Two Worlds). She was also one of the first to write about Soweto. She also wrote Amandla in 1980 which focuses on the Soweto Uprising in 1976, as well as a collection of short stories called Soweto Stories which was published in 1989. Most of her writing was originally banned by the South African apartheid regime.

== Life and work ==
Miriam Masoli Tlali was born in Doornfontein, Johannesburg, South Africa, and grew up in Sophiatown. She attended St Cyprian's Anglican School and then Madibane High School. She studied at the University of the Witwatersrand until it was closed to Blacks during the apartheid era; she later went to the National University of Lesotho (then called Pius the XII University) at Roma, Lesotho. Leaving there because of lack of funds, she went to secretarial school and found employment as a bookkeeper at a Johannesburg furniture store.

Tlali drew on her experiences as an office clerk for her first book, Muriel at Metropolitan, a semi-autobiographical novel whose "viewpoint is a new one in South African literature". Although written in 1969, it was not published for six years, being rejected by many publishing houses in South Africa. In 1975 Ravan Press published Muriel at Metropolitan: "only after removing certain extracts they thought would certainly offend the Censorship Board — the South African literary watchdog. But despite this effort, the novel was banned almost immediately after publication because the Censorship Board pronounced it undesirable in the South African political context." The book reached a wider audience after its publication in 1979 by Longman under her preferred title Between Two Worlds, and its subsequent translation into other languages, including Japanese, Polish, German and Dutch. In 1988, Tlali said in a paper delivered in Amsterdam before the Committee Against Censorship: "To the Philistines, the banners of books, the critics.... We black South African writers (who are faced with the task of conscientizing our people and ourselves are writing for those whom we know are the relevant audience. We are not going to write in order to qualify into your definition of what you describe as 'true art'.... Our duty is to write for our people and about them."

Her second novel, Amandla, which was based on the 1976 Soweto uprising, was also banned in South Africa soon after it was published in 1980. Later books by Tlali include Mihloti (meaning "Tears"), a collection of short stories, interviews and non-fiction, published in 1984 by the black publishing house Skotaville, which she co-founded. Her novels were unbanned in 1986. Her 1989 book Footprints in the Quag, published in South Africa by David Philip, was brought out under the title Soweto Stories by Pandora Press.

Tlali co-founded and contributed to Staffrider magazine, for which she wrote a regular column, "Soweto Speaking", as well as writing for other South African publications, including the Rand Daily Mail.

Tlali's literary activities took her to different parts of the world, including the Netherlands, where she worked for a year, and the USA. In 1978, she participated in an international writing programme at Iowa State University, giving lectures in San Francisco, Atlanta, Washington DC, and New York, and between 1989 and 1990 was a visiting scholar at the Southern African Research Program at Yale University. In 2010, she featured in the international symposium Women's Words: African Worlds: Renewing a Dialogue between African Women Writers and Women of African Descent, which took place at Johannesburg's Windybrow Theatre.

Tlali died in 2017 at the age of 83. A volume of her selected writings entitled Miriam Tlali: Writing Freedom, edited and introduced by Pumla Dineo Gqola, was published in 2021.

== Personal life ==
Miriam Tlali married Stephen Lehutso, and "followed the unusual practice for an African woman of her times when she decided to retain her maiden surname". Her husband died in 2001, and their two children also predeceased Tlali, son Moses in 2004 and daughter Molebogeng in 2012.

== Awards and honours ==
In 1995, Tlali was honoured by the South African government's Department of Arts, Culture, Science and Technology with a Literary Lifetime Achievement Award. In 2008, she received the Ikhamanga Silver presidential award.

On 11 November 2018, Google recognized her with a doodle on what would have been her 85th birthday.

== Features ==
Oprah Winfrey magazine

== Selected bibliography ==
- Muriel at Metropolitan, Johannesburg: Ravan Press, 1975. As Between Two Worlds, Longman, 1979.
- Amandla, South Africa: Vivlia Publishers, 1980, ISBN 978-0869751893.
- Mihloti, Johannesburg: Skotaville, 1984.
- Footprints in the Quag, David Philip Publishers, 1989, ISBN 978-0864861269. As Soweto Stories, London: Pandora, 1989.
- Geteilte Welt (Muriel at the Metropolitan German translation), Lehutso Legacy LLC., 1975
- Soweto Stories, German translation Lehutso Legacy LLC.
