= Caroline Ncube =

Zimbabwean academic

- Citizenship: Zimbabwe
- Occupation: Professor at the University of Cape Town

Academic background
- Education: University of Zimbabwe (LLB); University of Cambridge (LLM); University of Cape Town (PhD)
- Thesis: Intellectual property protection for e-commerce business methods in South Africa (2011)
- Doctoral advisor: Julian Kinderlerer

Academic work
- Discipline: Commercial law
- Sub-discipline: Intellectual property law
- Website: carolinebncube.com

Caroline Bongiwe Ncube is a Zimbabwean academic who is a professor of commercial law at the University of Cape Town. She holds the South African Research Chair in Intellectual Property, Innovation, and Development. Her primary research interest is intellectual property law and its socioeconomic implications.

== Academic background ==
Originally from Zimbabwe, Ncube completed an LLB at the University of Zimbabwe in 1995. After a short time in private practice as an attorney at Coghlan, Welsh & Guest, she read for an LLM at the University of Cambridge in 2000. After graduating, she worked as a lecturer at the University of Limpopo and the University of Zimbabwe.

In 2005, Ncube joined the University of Cape Town, where she was a lecturer in the Department of Commercial Law while working part-time on her PhD in intellectual property (IP) law. She completed her PhD in June 2011.

== Academic positions ==
After receiving her PhD, she continued lecturing at UCT, where she was head of the commercial law department between 2014 and 2016. She was promoted to full professor in 2016. She holds the South African Research Chair in Intellectual Property, Innovation, and Development, which is hosted by UCT, funded by the Department of Science and Technology, and administered by the National Research Foundation. She is also affiliated with UCT's intellectual property unit.

At UCT, Ncube was deputy dean for postgraduate studies in 2017 and 2019, and she reprised her role as head of the commercial law department in 2022. She has written about the decolonisation of legal education and piloted a "decolonised" IP curriculum at UCT.

Ncube is a member of the Academy of Science of South Africa. She has served on advisory panels for organisations including the African Continental Free Trade Area Secretariat, the African Union, and the United Nations Economic Commission for Africa. She is a member of the International Association for the Advancement of Teaching and Research in Intellectual Property, a member of the editorial board of the Journal of World Intellectual Property, and a member of the international steering committee of the Open African Innovation Research Network.

== Scholarship ==
Ncube's primary research interests are IP law and policy and their calibration to achieve national socioeconomic goals in African states. In particular, she has studied the effect of IP law on the promotion of innovation in African contexts, such as in the informal sector, as well as its effect on access to information and the protection of indigenous knowledge. Her 2015 monograph, Intellectual Property Policy, Law, and Administration in Africa: Exploring Continental and Sub-regional Cooperation, is about the effect of African regional integration efforts on the development of IP law and policy in Africa.

== Personal life ==
In August 2003 she immigrated to South Africa, where she has permanent resident status. Ncube is married. She has two sons.
