= Namrita Lall =

South African academic

Namrita Lall OMB
- Occupation: Professor of plant sciences at the University of Pretoria
- Awards: UNESCO-L'Oréal International Fellowship (2002); Order of Mapungubwe (2014)

Academic background
- Education: University of Transkei (BSc, MSc)
- Alma mater: University of Pretoria (PhD)
- Doctoral advisor: Marion Meyer

Academic work
- Discipline: Botany
- Sub-discipline: Medicinal plant science
- Institutions: University of Pretoria (1997–present)
- Main interests: Ethnobotany and ethnopharmacology, cosmeceuticals, tuberculosis and cancer treatments

Namrita Lall is an Indian–South African botanist and pharmacologist who is professor of plant sciences at the University of Pretoria. She is an expert in medicinal plant science. At the University of Pretoria, she holds the South African Research Chair for Plant Health Products from Indigenous Knowledge Systems and leads a research group that is active in bioprospecting, particularly in respect of cosmeceuticals and tuberculosis and cancer treatments.

== Background ==
Lall was born and raised in India. She attended the University of Transkei, where she completed her undergraduate degree and a Master of Science in botany. Her master's thesis, entitled "A study of morphological and enzymatic changes in Impatiens flanaganiae grown under different light conditions", won a Southern Africa Association for the Advancement of Science Medal for Original Master's Research in 1996.

In 1997, Lall joined the University of Pretoria, where she pursued a PhD under the supervision of medicinal plants expert Marion Meyer. Her doctoral research discovered that naphthoquinone derivatives could help to treat liver problems associated with the use of tuberculosis medicines. After completing her PhD in 2001, she remained at the University of Pretoria's Department of Plant and Soil Sciences, first as a lecturer and later as a professor.

She currently holds the South African Research Chair for Plant Health Products from Indigenous Knowledge Systems, which is hosted at the University of Pretoria as part of the South African Research Chair Initiative to encourage progress in research by public universities. While conducting her own research and contributing to the scientific literature of South Africa, Lall's position also helps her endorse research pathways for graduate and doctoral students. She spearheaded the establishment of the multidisciplinary African Phytomedicine Scientific Society, which was launched in 2023, and she is currently the president of the International Society for Ethnopharmacology.

== Research ==
Lall is an NRF-rated researcher and has edited four books about medicinal plants. Essential Science Indicators placed her in the top one per cent of the pharmacology and toxicology discipline, as measured by volume of publication citations. Since beginning her research journey, Lall has earned many patents for leading the discovery of plants with potent medicinal qualities; four have been granted by South Africa, three by the United States, and multiple others by the European Union and countries in East Asia. At the University of Pretoria, she leads a research group in the Medicinal Plants Sciences Programme. The programme's main research focus is potential applications of medicinal plants, especially those from South Africa, in treating tuberculosis, cancer, and skin disorders, as well as other antibacterial, hepatoprotective, and immunomodulatory effects of plant compounds. Thus, Lall's research emphasizes the isolation and purification of chemicals in these medicinal plants, contributing to the larger endeavor of making healthcare more globally accessible, and necessitates close collaboration with leaders of the plant-based products industry. Lall has also helped develop treatments for periodontal diseases.

Her research group places significant emphasis on bioprospecting, drug discovery via validation of ethnopharmocological findings, and the commercialisation of active ingredients for pharmaceuticals and cosmeceuticals. As of 2023, her lab had developed 19 prototype extracts, with various applications, that underwent extensive research and development; eleven were patented in South Africa or abroad. A product for hyperpigmentation was commercialised internationally as a result, and a complementary medicine for liver protection was marketed in South Africa as Limunone. In this vein, Lall served for a period as coordinator of the DSI Cosmeceutical Consortium, the aim of which was to commercialise indigenous biological resources for cosmetic development.

== Other honours ==
In March 2002, Lall was awarded a UNESCO-L'Oréal International Fellowship to support her research in bacteriology.

In August 2011, the Department of Science and Technology (DST) honoured her at its annual Women in Science Awards, giving her the Distinguished Women in Science Award in the category of indigenous knowledge systems.

In April 2014, President Jacob Zuma awarded her the Order of Mapungubwe in Bronze for "Her outstanding contribution to the field of medical sciences", particularly her contribution to tuberculosis treatment through research into the antimycobacterial properties of plant compounds.

In October 2021, University of Pretoria Vice-Chancellor Tawana Kupe presented Lall with the university's Vice-Chancellor's Award for Excellent Supervision, which recognises exceptional supervision as measured by the achievements of the supervisor's postgraduate research students.
