= Cathi Albertyn =

South African academic

- Occupation: Professor at the University of the Witwatersrand

Academic background
- Education: University of Cape Town (BA, LLB); University of Cambridge (MPhil, PhD)
- Thesis: A critical analysis of political trials in South Africa 1948–1988 (1991)

Academic work
- Discipline: Constitutional law
- Main interests: Human rights, equality and social justice, gender

Catherine Hester Albertyn is a South African academic who is a professor of law at the University of the Witwatersrand, where she holds the South African Research Chair in Equality, Law and Social Justice. Known for her work in constitutional law, she has been a professor at the university since 2001 and formerly ran its Centre for Applied Legal Studies between 2001 and 2007. She has also served as a commissioner at the Commission for Gender Equality and the South African Law Reform Commission.

== Education ==
She entered the University of Cape Town in 1977, completing a BA in 1979 and a LLB in 1982. Thereafter she attended the University of Cambridge, where she received an MPhil in criminology and law in 1984 and a PhD in law in 1992. While completing her PhD, in 1991, Albertyn was admitted as an attorney of the High Court of South Africa.

== University of the Witwatersrand ==
Between 1992 and 2007, Albertyn worked at the Centre for Applied Legal Studies (CALS), a research and litigation institute attached to the University of the Witwatersrand (Wits) in Johannesburg. She was a senior researcher and head of the CALS Gender Research Project from 1992 to 2001. At the same time, President Nelson Mandela appointed her to the inaugural Commission for Gender Equality in 1997, and she was hired by Wits as an associate professor of law in 1999.

In 2001, Albertyn was promoted to become full professor and overall director of CALS. While she was still holding that position, in 2005, the Judicial Service Commission shortlisted her as a candidate to fill Arthur Chaskalson's empty seat on the Constitutional Court of South Africa. She interviewed for the vacancy in October 2005, but Bess Nkabinde was appointed instead.

Albertyn left her position at CALS at the end of April 2007, but she remained a professor at Wits and also became a commissioner at the South African Law Reform Commission, where she served between 2007 and 2011. In May 2018, the National Research Foundation (NRF) appointed her as South African Research Chair in Equality, Law and Social Justice. The chair is hosted by Wits, where she remains a professor of law.

== Scholarship ==
Albertyn is rated a B1-level researcher by the NRF. Her research focuses on constitutional law and social justice, with a particular interest in equality and gender equality. An article by Albertyn about substantive equality, published in 2018 in the South African Journal on Human Rights, was cited in the Constitutional Court's judgement in Mahlangu v Minister of Labour.

== Other positions ==
Albertyn co-founded the Reproductive Rights Alliance while she was at CALS. She has also served on the executive board of the Council for the Advancement of the South African Constitution, as well as on the editorial boards of the South African Journal on Human Rights, the University of Oxford Human Rights Hub Journal, and the South African Judicial Education Journal.

== Other honours ==
Albertyn is a member of the Academy of Science of South Africa. In October 2023, Wits awarded her its Supervision Award in recognition of her excellent record in postgraduate student supervision.
