= Penny Moore (virologist) =

Virologist

Penelope Moore
- Born: 29 April 1975 (age 51)
- Education: University of Witwatersrand; University of London
- Known for: HIV research, Covid 19 research, Omicron variant
- Scientific career
- Fields: Virology
- Workplaces: University of the Witwatersrand; NICD
- Website: Prof Moore at WITS

Penelope Moore is a virologist and DST/NRF South African Research Chair of Virus-Host Dynamics at the University of the Witwatersrand in Johannesburg, South Africa and Senior Scientist at the National Institute for Communicable Diseases.

== Education and work ==
Moore received her Master of Science degree in Microbiology from the University of Witwatersrand. In 2003, she completed her PhD in Virology at the University of London.

She was one of the first scientists to bring the Omicron variant of COVID-19 to public attention. She remarked of the pace of the preliminary research that “We’re flying at warp speed.

Her current work focuses on the HIV neutralizing antibodies and their interactions with HIV. These antibodies would form the basis for an HIV vaccine.

== Recognition ==
In 2009, Moore received a Sydney Brenner Fellowship from the Academy of Science of South Africa (ASSAf) and was awarded a Friedel Sellschop Award by the University of the Witwatersrand.

In 2015 while at the Centre for HIV and STI at the NICD and the Wits School of Pathology Moore was awarded the Chair in Virus-Host Dynamics for Public Health at Wits.

In 2018 Moore was awarded a Silver Medal by the South African Medical Research Council for "important scientific contributions made within 10 years of having been awarded [her] PhD."

Moore is a founding member of the South African Young Academy of Science, a full Member of the American Society for Virology and a Member of the ASSAf.

== See also ==
- Glenda Gray
