= Anna-Lise Williamson =

Professor of Virology

- Education: University of the Witwatersrand; Doctor of Philosophy (PhD), Virology
- Scientific career
- Fields: Virology
- Thesis: An Electron Microscope and Immunocytochemical Study of Jaagsiekte (1985)
- Website: www.virology.uct.ac.za/vir/staff/anna-lise-williamson

Anna-Lise Williamson FRSSAf MASSAf is a South African virologist. She is a Professor of Virology at the University of Cape Town. Her area of expertise is human papillomavirus, but is also known on an international level for her work in developing vaccines for HIV. These vaccines have been introduced into phase 1 of clinical trial. Williamson has published more than 120 papers.

== Education ==
Williamson received a PhD at the University of the Witwatersrand in 1985. Her Ph.D. thesis was entitled "An Electron Microscopic and Immunocytochemical Study of Jaagsiekte". Williamson was also a fellow at the Royal Society of South Africa and at the University of Cape Town.

== Accomplishments ==
Anna-Lise Williamson is the Director of University of the Cape Town vaccine Research group GLP. Her area of expertise and what she is best known for is Human Papillomavirus and HIV Vaccines.

- Awarded a Chair in Vaccinology 2008 (South African Research Chairs Initiative)
- Head of World Health Organization human papillomavirus Labnet lab for the Africa Region
- Joint Head of University of Cape Town, National Institute for communicable Diseases, and National health Laboratory Service Molecular Epidemiology Laboratory
- Member of the South African HPV Advisory Board
- Member of the Academy of Science of South Africa

== Contributions ==
Anna-Lise Williamson is the head of the HIV vaccine development and human papilloma research group at the University of Cape Town. There, Williamson and a team of over 30 people are developing vaccines for HIV-1 subtype C virus. This strain is known to be the most Virulent, and known to be the principle strain that leads to AIDS.The goal of the investigation is to create affordable and effective HIV-1 C vaccines, that would increase the longevity of memory T cells and develop a more functional use of the CD4+ and CD8+ cell response. Two vaccines have been selected to move forward in clinical trials. These vaccines are DNA vaccines and a modified vaccinia virus Ankara vaccine. The vaccines were developed as part of the South African AIDS Vaccine Initiative (SAAVI).

== Selected publications ==
Anna-Lise Williamson has published over 120 papers. Her publications mainly consists of her area of expertise addressing HIV vaccine development, HIV virus, and HPV virus.

- Marais, D. J.; Constant, D.; Allan, B.; Carrara, H.; Hoffman, M.; Shapiro, S.; Morroni, C.; Williamson, A.-L. (2007). "Cervical Human Papillomavirus (HPV) Infection and HPV Type 16 Antibodies in South African Women". Journal of Clinical Microbiology. 46 (2): 732–739. doi:10.1128/JCM.01322-07. ISSN 0095-1137. PMC 2238115. PMID 18077644.The purpose of this publication is to identify subtypes of HIV-1 in both homosexual and heterosexual males in the Cape Town, South Africa population.
- Shephard, Enid; Burgers, Wendy A.; Van Harmelen, Joanne H.; Monroe, James E.; Greenhalgh, Trish; Williamson, Carolyn; Williamson, Anna-Lise (2008). "A Multigene HIV Type 1 Subtype C Modified Vaccinia Ankara (MVA) Vaccine Efficiently Boosts Immune Responses to a DNA Vaccine in Mice". AIDS Research and Human Retroviruses. 24 (2): 207–217. doi:10.1089/aid.2007.0206. ISSN 0889-2229. PMID 18240963.The goal of this publication is to identify the prevalence and risk factors associated with HPV Infection, and HPV-16 antibody in the population of Southern Africa.
- Adler, D.; Bruyn, G. d.; Laher, F.; Gray, G.; Allan, B. R.; Williamson, A.-L. (2008). "Human Papillomavirus Genotype Distribution among Human Immunodeficiency Virus (HIV)-Infected and Non-HIV-Infected Women in Soweto, South Africa". Journal of Clinical Microbiology. 46 (12): 4109–4110. doi:10.1128/JCM.01667-08. ISSN 0095-1137. PMC 2593278. PMID 18945842.
- Burgers, W. A.; Chege, G. K.; Muller, T. L.; van Harmelen, J. H.; Khoury, G.; Shephard, E. G.; Gray, C. M.; Williamson, C.; Williamson, A.-L. (2009). "Broad, high-magnitude and multifunctional CD4+ and CD8+ T-cell responses elicited by a DNA and modified vaccinia Ankara vaccine containing human immunodeficiency virus type 1 subtype C genes in baboons". Journal of General Virology. 90 (2): 468–480. doi:10.1099/vir.0.004614-0. ISSN 0022-1317. PMID 19141458.
- Marais, Dianne J.; Carrara, Henri; Ramjee, Gita; Kay, Patti; Williamson, Anna-Lise (2009). "HIV-1 seroconversion promotes rapid changes in cervical human papillomavirus (HPV) prevalence and HPV-16 antibodies in female sex workers". Journal of Medical Virology. 81 (2): 203–210. doi:10.1002/jmv.21343. ISSN 0146-6615. PMID 19107974. S2CID 32432184.
