= Haroon Bhorat =

South African economist

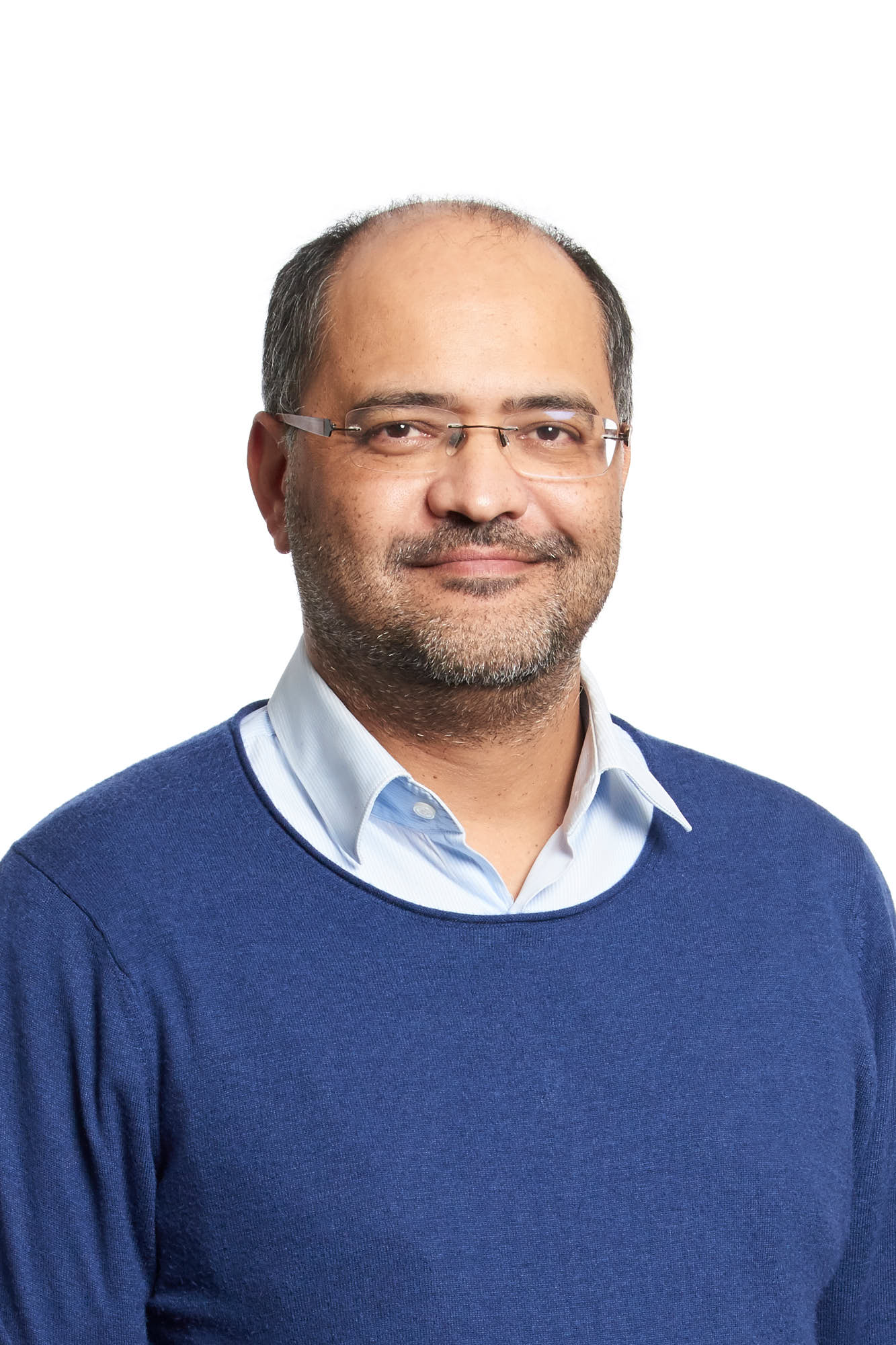
- Born: Roodepoort, South Africa

Academic background
- Education: University of Cape Town (BA); Stellenbosch University (MA) (Ph.D.)

Academic work
- Discipline: Development economics Labour economics

Haroon Bhorat is Professor of Economics and Director of the Development Policy Research Unit (DPRU) at the University of Cape Town. His area of research has concentrated on labour economics and poverty/income distribution mainly in his native South Africa, and recently, been expanded to other parts of Africa.

== Early life and education ==
Bhorat was born in Roodepoort, a mining town in Gauteng province, South Africa. He attended school at Diocesan College (Bishops) in Cape Town before achieving a BA (Honours) in Economics from University of Cape Town in 1991. He completed the coursework component of a Master of Economics at the Massachusetts Institute of Technology in 1992, then proceeded to obtain a master's degree and Ph.D., in Economics from Stellenbosch University in 1996 and 2003 respectively.

== Career ==
Haroon Bhorat is Professor of Economics, and the Director of the Development Policy Research Unit (DPRU), a university-recognized research unit located within the School of Economics at the University of Cape Town, South Africa. He holds an National Research Foundation (South Africa) B2 rating, and with a total citation estimate of over 7700 and an h-index of 47 (as at October 2021), he is one of the most cited South African economists globally.

He is active on Twitter and features regularly on the DPRU's Facebook and YouTube accounts.

=== Appointments and memberships ===
Bhorat is a member of the South African Presidential Economic Advisory Council (PEAC), announced by President Cyril Ramaphosa in the 2019 State of the Nation Address (South Africa), to ensure greater coherence and consistency in the implementation of economic policy and ensure that government and society in general is better equipped to respond to changing economic circumstances. Bhorat also advised previous Presidents Thabo Mbeki and Kgalema Motlanthe on economic matters, formally serving on the Presidential Economic Advisory Panel. Bhorat was the Minister of Labour's appointee on the Employment Conditions Commission (ECC) – the country's minimum wage setting body. He is a member of the Statistics Council of South Africa. He has served as advisor to the South African National Treasury, and former South African Minister of Finance, Pravin Gordhan. He has undertaken extensive work for several South African government departments – most notably the Department of Employment and Labour and the Presidency, including an appointment as Advisor on the South African Parliament's High Level Panel on Acceleration of Change and Transformation.

He joined the IZA as Research Fellow in January 2013 and is a regular IZA World of Labor contributor. In 2013/4 he was invited to be a Non-resident Senior Fellow at Brookings affiliated to the Global Economy and Development programme, and working on the Africa Growth Initiative (AGI). Bhorat was inducted to the UCT College of Fellows in 2021.

Bhorat consults for a number of supranational organisations such as the World Bank, the UNDP, and the ILO, Ratings Agencies and emerging market fund managers. He is an Advisory Board Member for the UNU World Institute for Development Economics Research (UNU-WIDER), Executive Committee Member for the International Economic Association (IEA), a member of the ILO's Global Research Reference Group (RRG), a member of Board of Directors for Partnership for Economic Policy (PEP). He sat on the advisory board of the UNDP's 2019 and 2020 Human Development Reports, and was a member of the World Bank's advisory board of the Commission on Global Poverty, as well as a member of the Program Committee of the 2017 International Economic Association (IEA) World Congress.

He is a member on the Advisory Committee of the joint United Nations and World Bank Policy Study on the role of Development in the Prevention of Violent Conflict. He also sits on the UN/WHO's High Level Commission on Health Employment and Economic Growth. Haroon previously served as a member of the UN Commission on Legal Empowerment of the Poor (LEP), and was Head of Research for the UN's High-Level Panel on the Post-2015 Development Agenda.

Prof. Bhorat holds the DST/NRF SARChI Chair in Economic Growth, Poverty and Inequality Research. He also served as a Social Sciences jury member for the Infosys Prize 2020.

=== Academic contributions ===
Bhorat's work has three key strands: First, there is a long-standing focus on the empirics of household poverty and inequality dynamics in South Africa. Secondly, a consistent and expansive research programme for a period close to 25 years - on developing country labour markets. Thirdly, and possibly much more recently, there has been a relatively new avenue of research on trying to undertake applied work in the area of economic complexity. In each strand, his modus operandi is the application of econometric techniques to large survey datasets.

Serving in a variety of public roles ranging from high-level advisory work for government departments and multi-lateral institutions, to giving public lectures and seminar presentations at the world's leading universities (including for example Columbia University, Cornell University, Yale University and University of Oxford), Bhorat's ability to seamlessly switch between conducting hard empirical analysis and providing evidence-based policy advice that is accessible to a broader audience, has had a direct impact on the discipline. His research feeds into policy decisions and pronouncements at the highest level, including Cabinet memoranda, State of the Nation Address (South Africa) and legislative promulgation. His work has been hugely influential in policy making in respect of poverty, inequality and labour market issues in South Africa.

Bhorat and the DPRU have become the international focal point for African work on understanding the impact of minimum wages in the region. Hence the South African National Minimum Wage Commission have requested Prof. Bhorat and his team undertake the impact analysis of the National Minimum Wage (NMW) (2020-2021). This work uses econometric techniques that combine a Difference in differences with a Regression discontinuity design. In addition, minimum wage analysis is being done for Mauritius, the Comoros, and other African countries. He is widely considered to be one of the leading experts in the world on understanding minimum wages and their impact in the developing country context. This research has elicited a significant debate and discussion within the academic and policy community and the ongoing body of work is viewed as a novel intellectual contribution to the South African, and arguably developing country, literature.

This work on minimum wages has also been extended via the development of a Multiple Index of Violation (MVI). The MVI is a novel index used to measure the extent and depth of minimum wage violation, and includes non-wage measures of violation. The MVI involves applying the Alkire-Foster method of measuring multi-dimensional poverty and also using principal components to robustness check the measure (see British Journal of Industrial Relations article). The MVI has now been applied globally in 24 countries around the world.

His early work on poverty and inequality dynamics, much of it in collaboration with Professor Murray Leibbrandt, served as the first empirical work on post-apartheid survey datasets examining poverty and inequality dynamics in South Africa. It is fair to say that this body of work - which garnered the Alan Pifer book Award and spawned a series of journal articles - has served as the intellectual seedbed for all the future empirical work by economists, on poverty and inequality issues in South Africa. Some of his earliest research involved a series of studies conducted with Murray Leibbrandt and Prof Ingrid Woolard, that used covariates such as race, gender, education and location as a good predictor of vulnerability in the South African labour market.

Bhorat has also conducted research on Sub-Saharan Africa economies' labour markets, where he finds a largely unenforced minimum wage laws riddled with complexity and vagueness. Furthermore, the study finds that the minimum wage levels within Sub-Saharan Africa seem to be set at various levels relative to median wages, with largely negative impacts on employment levels within African countries. His rich vein of research on labour markets in South Africa rank him possibly as the best known economist working on South African labour market issues. His work has ranged from estimated the gender pay gap in South Africa, to a more careful econometric assessment of the contribution of union membership to wages across the distribution. Most notably though, he was at the forefront of the debates in the early 2000s around labour regulation in South Africa, using his multiple publications to build an empirical argument for estimating the level of labour regulation in South Africa. More recently, and in keeping with Bhorat's attempt to remain at the forefront of trying to analyse changing labour market dynamics in South Africa, he has sought to understand the phenomenon of wage polarisation in South Africa. Using a combination of unique data-sets as well as fairly novel econometric techniques, this work feeds into the global labour market literature on how the task content of occupations are fundamentally changing the nature of work as well as the returns to employment.

Bhorat was also a key player in the first example of inter-disciplinary academic analysis focused on the emerging Shadow State and institutionalised corruption in South Africa, purposefully targeted at a non-academic audience. "Betrayal of the Promise: How South Africa is Being Stolen" was produced by a number of academics, under the banner of the State Capacity Research Group. This report on state capture in South Africa, was made publicly available in mid-2017, aiming to contribute to an analytically clear, and academically rigorous, treatment of institutionalised corruption in South Africa – and contributing to the public debate about 'State capture'. Prof. Bhorat and a select group of DPRU researchers then started work on related projects such as: "State Capture and the Economics of Corruption" and "Removing Corruption in State-Owned Enterprises in South Africa: Towards An Action Plan". The research aimed to situate the case of South Africa within the relevant literature, and critically assess how to define what has taken place. They focused on the central role that State-owned enterprises (SOEs) have played given their prominence in the SA economy and their location at the interface between the State and the private sector. The research team used the Worldwide Governance Indicators (WGI) and analysed governance, taking a more detailed empirical approach informed by their access to data.

== Bibliography ==
=== Edited books ===
These are some of Bhorat's edited books:

- Better Choices for South Africa, FORTHCOMING. Co-edited with Mcebisi Jonas and Greg Mills; Brenthurst Foundation, South Africa.
- Haroon Bhorat; Buthelezi, M.; Chipkin, I.; Duma, S.; Friedenstein, H.; Mondi, L.; Peter, C.; Prins, N.; Qobo, M.; Swilling, M. (2018). Shadow State: The Politics of State Capture. Wits University Press. p. 176. ISBN 978-1-77614-214-9.
- Haroon Bhorat; Conceição, P.; Cornia, G.A.; Odusola, A., eds. (2017). Income Inequality Trends in sub-Saharan Africa: Divergence, determinants and consequences. United Nations Development Programme. p. 436. ISBN 978-92-1-126424-1.
- Haroon Bhorat; Finn Tarp, eds. (2016). Africa's Lions: Growth Traps and Opportunities for Six African Economies. Brookings Institution Press. p. 270. ISBN 978-0-8157-2949-5.
- Haroon Bhorat; Ravi Kanbur, eds. (2006). Poverty and Policy in Post- Apartheid South Africa. [HSRC Press]. p. 512. ISBN 978-0-7969-2122-2.
- Haroon Bhorat; Murray Leibbrandt; Muzi Maziya; Servaas Van Der Berg; Ingrid Woolard, eds. (2001). Fighting Poverty: Labour Markets and Inequality in South Africa. [Juta and Company Ltd]. p. 252. ISBN 978-1-919713-62-5.

=== Book chapters ===
Bhorat has authored (or co-authored) over 50 book chapters.

=== Journal articles ===
Bhorat has written more than 30 refereed journal articles including:

- Haroon Bhorat; Morne Oosthuizen; Benjamin Stanwix (2021). "Social Assistance Amidst the Covid-19 Epidemic in South Africa: A Policy Assessment". South African Journal of Economics. 89 (1): 63–81. doi:10.1111/saje.12277. ISSN 0038-2280.
- Haroon Bhorat; Ravi Kanbur; Benjamin Stanwix; Amy Thornton (2020). "Measuring Multidimensional Labour Law Violation, With an Application to South Africa". British Journal of Industrial Relations. 59 (3): 928–961. doi:10.1111/bjir.12580.
- Haroon Bhorat; Ravi Kanbur; Benjamin Stanwix (2019). "Compliance with labor laws in developing countries". IZA World of Labor. 2 (1). doi:10.15185/izawol.80.v2. hdl:10419/206584.
- Haroon Bhorat; Ravi Kanbur; Benjamin Stanwix (2017). "Minimum wages in sub-Saharan Africa: A primer". The World Bank Research Observer. 31 (2) lkw007. doi:10.1093/wbro/lkw007. hdl:10986/30139.
- Haroon Bhorat; Ravi Kanbur; Natasha Mayet (2013). "The impact of sectoral minimum wage laws on employment, wages, and hours of work in South Africa". IZA Journal of Labor & Development. 2 (1). doi:10.1186/2193-9020-2-1. hdl:10.1186/2193-9020-2-1.
- Haroon Bhorat; Murray Leibbrandt; Ingrid Woolard (2000). "Understanding contemporary household inequality in South Africa". Journal for Studies in Economic and Econometrics. 24 (3): 31–52. doi:10.1080/03796205.2000.12129275. hdl:11427/7246. S2CID 53599919.
- Haroon Bhorat; James Hodge (1999). "Decomposing Shifts in Labour Demand in South Africa". South African Journal of Economics. 67 (3): 155–168. doi:10.1111/j.1813-6982.1999.tb01146.x.

He was also a guest editor for IZA Journal of Labor & Development, with Ravi Kanbur and Li Shi, for the Special Collection, titled "Thematic series on Reforming Minimum Wage and Labor Regulation Policies in Developing Economies" in 2016.

=== Other publications ===
Bhorat has published more than 20 non-refereed journal articles, 36 collaborative working papers, 63 DPRU working papers, 10 DPRU policy briefs, and more than 100 research reports. He regularly publishes blogs, book reviews, analysis pieces and Op-eds in the media, and is frequently interviewed and cited by the press. Many of his presentations in webinars, conferences and other invited speaking engagements, are available online.
