= Jacek Banasiak =

Polish mathematician (born 1959)

Professor Jacek Banasiak FAAS
- Born: 15 March 1959 (age 66); Łódź, Poland
- Citizenship: Poland; South Africa
- Education: Łódź University of Technology (MSc); University of Strathclyde (PhD); University of Warsaw (PD)
- Awards: SAMS award for Research Distinction; Polish Cross of Merit (Silver)
- Scientific career
- Fields: Semigroup theory Asymptotic analysis Mathematical biology Fragmentation coagulation equations Difference and differential equations
- Institutions: University of KwaZulu-Natal; University of Pretoria; Łódź University of Technology; University of Strathclyde
- Thesis: On mixed initial-boundary value problems for second-order elliptic and parabolic equations in non-smooth dom (1989)
- Doctoral advisor: Gary Francis Roach; Izydor Dziubiński

Jacek Banasiak (born 15 March 1959) is a Polish mathematician who is a Professor and South African Research Chair in Mathematical Models and Methods in Biosciences and Bioengineering at the University of Pretoria, South Africa.

== Early life and education ==
Jacek Banasiak was born on 15 March 1959 in Łódź, Poland. He obtained a Master of Science (MSc) in Math from the Łódź University of Technology in 1981, and Doctor of Philosophy (PhD) in mathematics on 15 March 1989 from the University of Strathclyde, Scotland. He was hablitated (PD) in Physics on 17 June 1999 from the Faculty of Mathematics, Informatics and Mechanics, University of Warsaw with a thesis titled Singularly Perturbed Evolution Equations with Applications in Kinetic Theory and Other Branches of Mathematical Physics.

== Career and research ==
Banasiak became a professor on 21 December 2007, and has been a Professor of Mathematical Sciences at the University of KwaZulu-Natal from 2011 until 2015. After, he joined the University of Pretoria and became the South African Research Chair in Mathematical Models and Methods in Biosciences and Bioengineering at the Department of Mathematics and Applied Mathematics, extraordinary professor at the Łódź University of Technology, and a visiting professor of Mathematics and Statistics at the Strathclyde University.

Banasiak research focuses on applied mathematics especially semigroup theory, asymptotic analysis, mathematical biology, fragmentations coagulation equations, and difference and differential equations.

Banasiak served as the vice president of the South African Mathematical Society (2001–2005). He is a member of the Academy of Science of South Africa and the African Institute for Mathematical Sciences (AIMS). He is also the Editor-in-Chief of Afrika Matematika since 2010, Associate Editor of Quaestiones Mathematicae and Evolution Equations and Control Theory (EECT), and a member of the Editorial Board of Mathematical Methods for the Applied Sciences and Differential Equations and Dynamical Systems.

== Awards and honours ==
In 2012, Banasiak won the South African Mathematical Society (SAMS) award for Research Distinction. In 2014, he was honoured with the Polish Cross of Merit (Silver) for his contributions to science. Banasiak was elected a Fellow of the African Academy of Sciences in 2016.

== Selected publications ==
- Banasiak, J.; Arlotti, Luisa (2006). Perturbations of positive semigroups with applications. London: Springer. ISBN 978-1-85233-993-7. OCLC 67766114.
- Banasiak, Jacek; Lachowicz, Mirosław (2014). "Methods of Small Parameter in Mathematical Biology". Modeling and Simulation in Science, Engineering and Technology. Cham: Springer International Publishing. doi:10.1007/978-3-319-05140-6. ISBN 978-3-319-05139-0. ISSN 2164-3679.
- Banasiak, Jacek; Mika, Janusz R. (1998-01-01). "Singularly perturbed telegraph equations with applications in the random walk theory". Journal of Applied Mathematics and Stochastic Analysis. 11 (1). Hindawi Limited: 9–28. doi:10.1155/s1048953398000021. ISSN 1048-9533.
- Mika, J. R.; Banasiak, J. (1995). Singularly perturbed evolution equations with applications to kinetic theory. Singapore: World Scientific. ISBN 981-02-2125-8. OCLC 32746102.
- Banasiak, J.; Lamb, Wilson; Laurençot, Philippe (2020). Analytic methods for coagulation-fragmentation models. Volume II. Boca Raton, FL. ISBN 978-0-429-28032-0. OCLC 1119391451.
