= Helen Rees =

South African doctor and professor

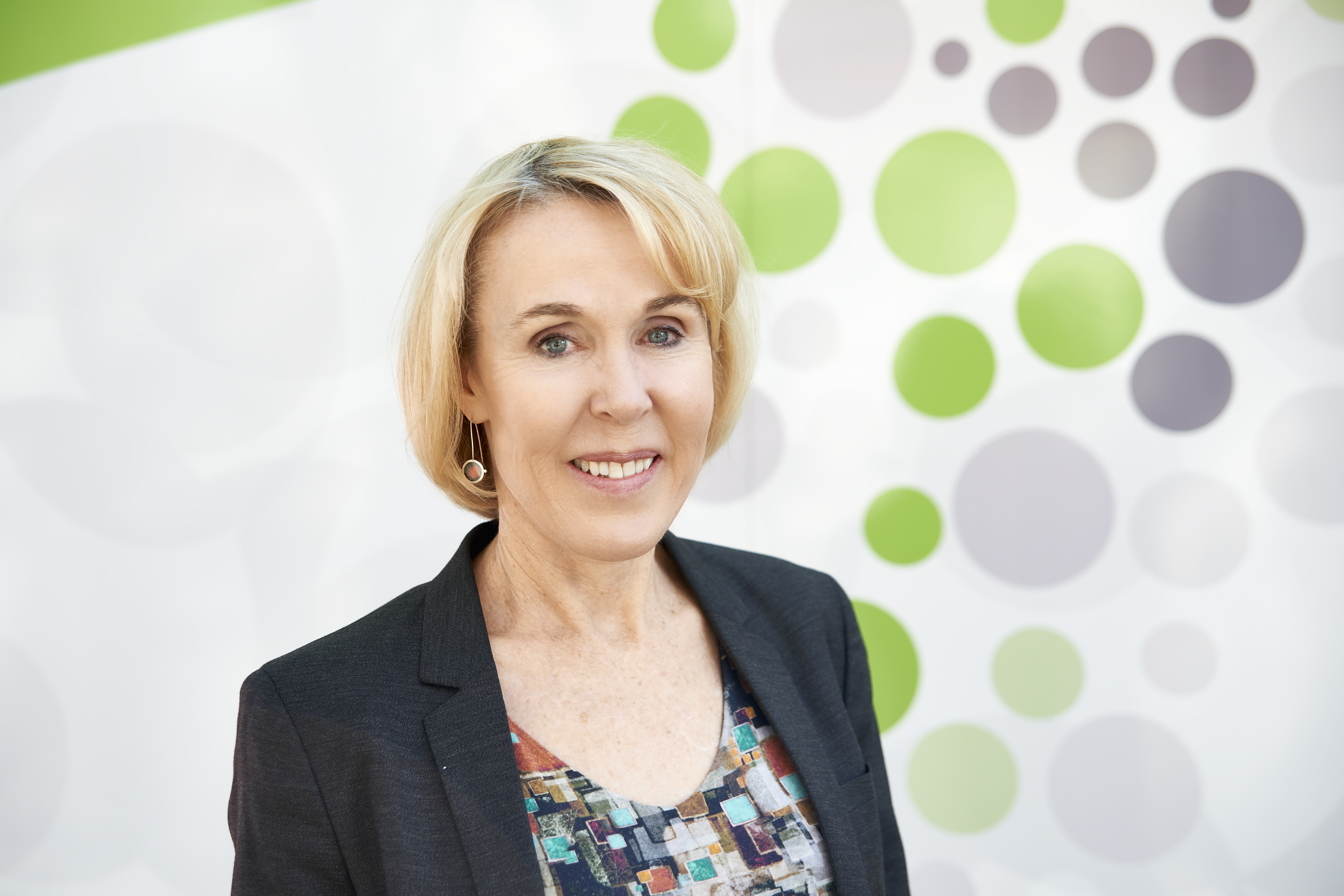
Image of Helen Rees

Professor Helen Rees OBE GCOB D.Sc. Medicine (honoris causa) LLD (honoris causa) is a medical doctor, and the founder and executive director of Wits RHI, the largest research Institute at the University of the Witwatersrand in Johannesburg, South Africa. She is a Personal Professor in the University of Witwatersrand's Department of Obstetrics and Gynaecology, co-director and co-founder of the African Leadership in Vaccinology Expertise (ALIVE), Honorary Professor in the Department of Clinical Research at the London School of Hygiene and Tropical Medicine and an Honorary Fellow at Cambridge University's Murray Edwards College, UK.

== Early life and education ==
Rees obtained her Medical Degree and Masters in Social and Political Sciences from New Hall College (now Murray Edwards College) at Cambridge University, and is now a Fellow of the college. For her master's degree, Rees combined social science with medical science by describing the adverse impact that the poorly managed elective induction of labour was having on both obstetric outcomes and on the experiences of women in labour.

Rees is an alumnus of Harvard Business School having completed the HBS Senior Executive Programme for Southern Africa.

== Career ==
Rees is internationally recognised as an award-winning global health practitioner who has dedicated her professional career to improving public health in Africa, with a focus on HIV, vaccine preventable diseases, women's health and medicines regulation. In 2018, she served as the chief investigator of FACTS 001, an African follow-up study to the smaller trial from 2010, which showed that South African women who used a vaginal gel containing tenofovir before and after sex were better protected from HIV than women who did not.

Rees has also chaired over 100 national and international scientific and policy committees, has over 250 scientific academic publications, has delivered over 400 invited plenary and keynote addresses, and contributed to the organisation of more than 100 conferences.

=== Committees and advisory work ===
Rees has served on and chaired many national and global scientific committees and boards and is widely respected for her ability to synthesize recommendations from multifaceted inputs and to link research to policy and has successfully chaired many national, regional and global committees in deliberations that have changed key strategies and policies in the African region. Rees has led national consultations at the invitation of the Ministries of Health in South Sudan, Ethiopia, Nigeria and the Democratic Republic of Congo. She is a keen advocate for increasing research capacity in LMICs.

Rees has served on expert structures and committees for WHO, UNAIDS, UNICEF, the Global Alliance for Vaccines and Immunisation and the Bill & Melinda Gates Foundation. She was the Chair of the WHO's Strategic Advisory Group of Experts on Immunization and she now chairs the WHO's African Regional Technical Advisory Group on Immunization.

Rees is recognized as a leader in global health policy and security. She has served on and chaired a number of WHO International Health Regulation (IHR) Emergency Committees. She is the Chair of WHO's IHR Emergency Committee on Polio. She co-Chairs the SAGE working group on Ebola Vaccines and is a member of WHO's Scientific and Technical Advisory Group on Infectious Hazards. She is a steering committee member of the Coalition for Clinical Research for Pandemics that focuses on research priorities in low- and middle-income countries. From 2015 to 2016, she was a member of the Review Committee on the Role of the International Health Regulations (2005) in the Ebola Outbreak and Response tasked with making recommendations to WHO about steps required to improve the global response to public health emergencies. She was the Chair of the WHO SAGE Committee on the Use of Vaccines in Humanitarian Emergencies.

In the field of vaccines and epidemics Rees chairs the Gavi Vaccine Investment Strategy that is developing a priority list for procurement of vaccines between 2025 and 2030 for the world's poorest 71 countries.

== Other activities ==
=== Government organizations ===
- South African Health Products Regulatory Authority (SAHPRA), Chair of the Board

=== Non-profit organizations ===
- MedAccess, Chair of the Board (since 2022)
- Coalition for Equitable ResearCh in Low-resource sEttings (CERCLE), Member of the Steering Committee

== Recognition ==
=== Honours ===
Rees has won many international and national awards for her contribution to global health and to science, specifically in 2001 receiving the Order of the British Empire by Queen Elizabeth II. In 2016 she was awarded the South African National Order of the Baobab by the President of South Africa for exceptional and distinguished contributions in medicine. In 2022, Rees received the platinum South African National Batho Pele Award for excellence in contribution to the South African COVID-19 response and was made an Officer of the French National Order of Merit in the same year by President Emmanuel Macron for her contribution to global health and to the COVID-19 response. In 2022 the Harvard Public Health named Rees a ‘standout voice’ in African public health.

=== Awards ===
In 2015, Rees was awarded the National Science and Technology Foundations’ Lifetime Achievement Award as well as the Harry Oppenheimer Fellowship given to a leading scholar who has a sustained a record of outstanding research and intellectual achievement at the highest level. In 2006 she was elected as a member of the Academy of Science of South Africa (ASSAf) member, and in 2010 was awarded the SA Academy of Science's Gold Award for outstanding achievement in scientific thinking to the benefit of society. She was awarded Wits University's Vice-Chancellor's Research Award (2012), Wits’ highest research recognition, and Wits Faculty of Health Sciences recognition for dedication and achievement in research (2013). She was the London School of Hygiene and Tropical Medicine's 2011 International Heath Clark lecturer awarded to an outstanding global health practitioner. The South African National Research Forum rates her as an outstanding international scientist. She was the first person to receive the SA Department of Science and Technology's award for the ‘Distinguished Scientist recognised for outstanding contribution to improving the quality of life of women’ (2006).

=== Honorary degrees ===
Rees holds a Doctor of Science (Medicine) honoris causa from the University of London and a Doctor of Laws honoris causa from Rhodes University, South Africa.
