= Francesco Petruccione =

South African scientist and professor

Francesco Petruccione MSc PhD DSc MASSAf FRSSAf
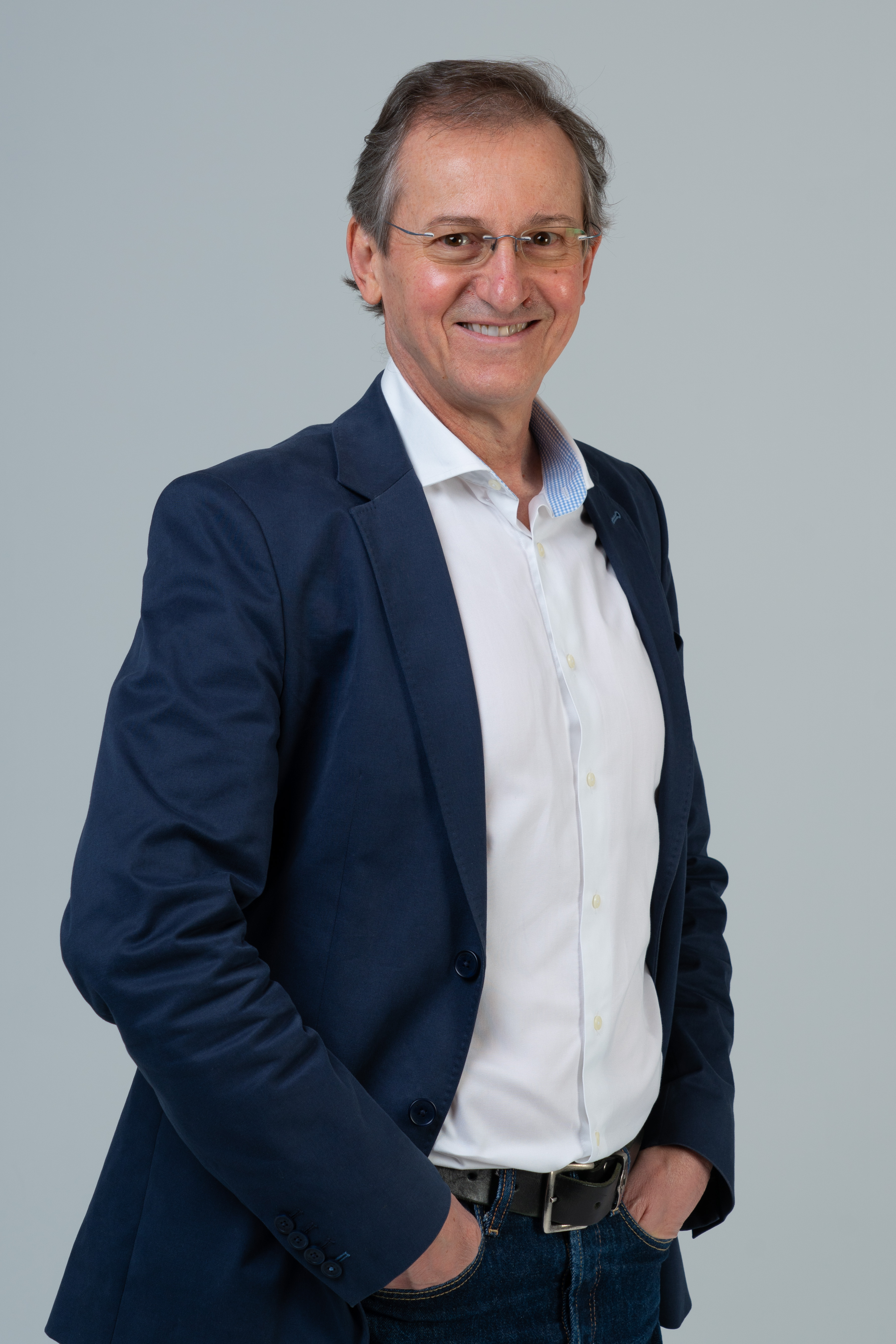
- Petruccione in 2021
- Born: 1961 (age 64–65); Genoa, Italy
- Occupations: Researcher; Scientist; Academic; Physicist

Academic background
- Education: University of Freiburg

Academic work
- Discipline: Physicist
- Sub-discipline: Quantum Physics; Open Quantum Systems; Quantum Machine Learning; Quantum Information Processing; Quantum Information Science
- Institutions: Stellenbosch University; National Institute for Theoretical and Computational Sciences; University of KwaZulu-Natal
- Notable students: Adriana Marais
- Website: https://quantum.sun.ac.za/

Francesco Petruccione is an Italian born South African physicist serving as a professor of Physics at Stellenbosch University and the director of the National Institute for Theoretical and Computational Sciences (NITheCS). With a wealth of experience in his field, he previously held the position of professor and Pro Vice-Chancellor of Big Data and Informatics at the University of KwaZulu-Natal (UKZN). Petruccione is also a member of the Academy of Science of South Africa and a Fellow of the Royal Society of South Africa.

== Early life and education ==
Francesco Petruccione was born in Genoa, Italy, in 1961. He pursued his undergraduate studies in physics at the University of Freiburg, Germany, where he earned his first degree in the field. Petruccione continued his academic journey at the same institution, earning his doctorate in 1988 and his Habilitation degree (Dr. rer. nat. habil.) in 1994.

== Career ==
In 2004, he became a professor of Theoretical Physics at the University of KwaZulu-Natal and was awarded an Innovation Fund grant the following year to establish a Centre for Quantum Technology. Petruccione went on to hold the position of South African Research Chair for Quantum Information Processing and Communication Technology in 2007.

In addition to his role as interim director of the National Institute for Theoretical and Computational Science (NITheCS), Petruccione also held an adjunct professor position at the Korean Advanced Institute for Science and Technology. In 2018, he was appointed Pro Vice-Chancellor of Big Data and Informatics at the University of KwaZulu-Natal (UKZN) before moving to Stellenbosch University in 2022 as a professor of Physics and Quantum Computing as part of the Physics Department and the School of Data Science and Computational Thinking.

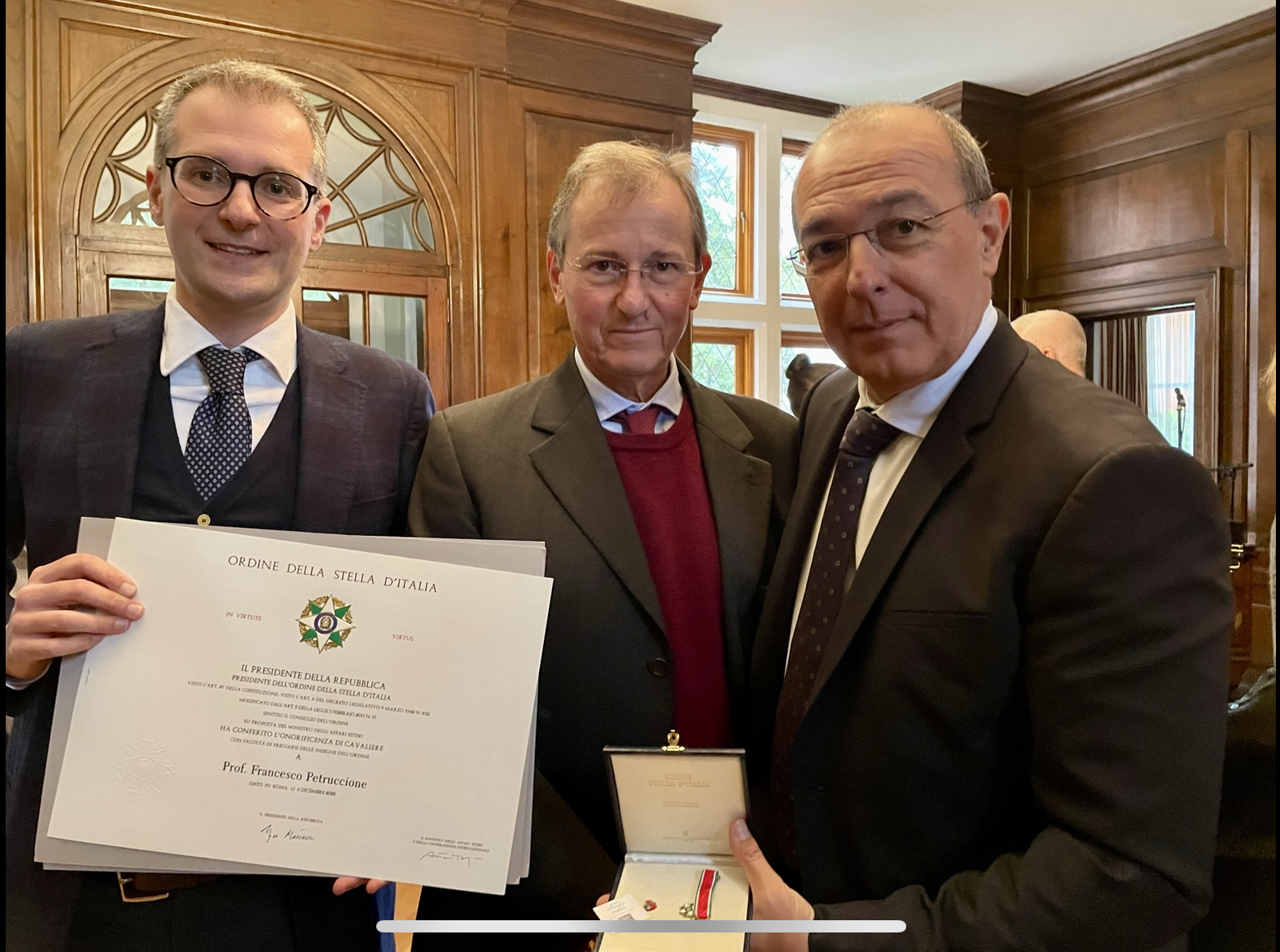
Francesco Petruccione receiving recognition at the Italian Order of the Star ceremony

In 2023 Petruccione was honored with the title of Cavaliere della Stella d'Italia, Order of the Star of Italy, at a function at the Italian Embassy in Cape Town, South Africa. As of May 2024 he has officially been appointed as director of NITheCS.

In 2025, he was involved in an international collaboration with the University of Science and Technology of China, where he contributed to a record-breaking intercontinental satellite-based quantum key distribution (QKD) link between South Africa and China.

== Selected publications ==
- Francesco Petruccione and Heinz-Peter Breuer: The Theory of Open Quantum Systems.
- Maria Schuld and Francesco Petruccione: Machine Learning with Quantum Computers.
- Maria Schuld and Francesco Petruccione: Supervised Learning with Quantum Computers
- Heinz-Peter Breuer & Francesco Petruccione: How to build master equations for complex systems
- Shivani Mahashakti Pillay, Ilya Sinayskiy, Edgar Jembere & Francesco Petruccione: Implementing Quantum-Kernel-Based Classifiers in the NISQ Era
- Carsten Blank & Francesco Petruccione Quantum Applications - Fachbeitrag: Vielversprechend: Monte-Carlo-ähnliche Methoden auf dem Quantencomputer
- Lavanya Singh, Ugochukwu J. Anyaneji, Wilfred Ndifon, Neil Turok, Stacey A. Mattison, Richard Lessells, Ilya Sinayskiy, Emmanuel J. San, Houriiyah Tegally, Shaun Barnett, Trevor Lorimer, Francesco Petruccione & Tulio de Oliveira: Implementation of an efficient SARS-CoV-2 specimen pooling strategy for high throughput diagnostic testing.
- Camille L. Latune, Ilya Sinayskiy & Francesco Petruccione: Roles of quantum coherences in thermal machines.
- M. Schuld, M. Fingerhuth, Francesco Petruccione: Implementing a distance-based classifier with a quantum interference circuit.
