= Leila Patel =

Leila Patel (born 22 May 1952) is a professor of Social Development and Social Work at the Centre for Social Development in Africa based in the University of Johannesburg.

== Education ==
She obtained Diploma and Higher Diploma degrees both in Social Work from the University of the Western Cape in 1976 and 1977 respectively. She proceeded to the Western Michigan University where she earned a MSW in Social Policy, Social Planning and Administration in 1979. Finally, she obtained a Ph.D. from Wits University in 1992.

== Career ==
She played a leading role in crafting South Africa's welfare policy post-apartheid. Patel's research looks at social welfare and social development with concentration on social protection, gender and care, and children and youth.

== Awards ==
In 2014 she received the Distinguished Woman Scientist Award in the Humanities and Social Sciences and in 2015 she was awarded the South African Research Chair in Welfare and Development by the Ministry of Science and Technology and the National Research Foundation. She received the Distinguished Alumni Award from the University of the Western Cape in 2015. In 2019, Prof. Leila Patel delivered Prestigious Dan Sanders Peace and Justice Lecture at the 21st biennial international conference of the International Consortium for Social Development (ICSD), held at the Universitas Gadjah Mada, Yogyakarta, Indonesia, July 16-19. In 2023, Distinguished Professor Leila Patel delivered Shanti Khinduka Social Development Lecture at the 23rd biennial international conference of the ICSD, organised by the University of Gavle, Sweden, August 23-25. In the same conference, President of the ICSD, Prof. Manohar Pawar, Charles Sturt University, presented a prestigious The James Billups International Social Development Leadership Award to Distinguished Professor Leila Patel.

Patel is an authority on South African welfare policy with extensive local and international recognition.

Outside academia, Patel has served as an Independent Non-Executive Director of Liberty Group Ltd. since 2004, a Director at the aforementioned company from 2008 to 2012.

== Select publications ==
=== Books ===
- Leila Patel. Social Welfare and Social Development in South Africa (2nd ed.). Oxford University Press.
- Patel. L; Plagerson, S. and Chinyoka, I. (2023). Handbook on Social Protection and Social Development in the Global South. Edward Elgar Publishing.
