= National Advisory Group on Immunization =

The National Advisory Group on Immunization (NAGI), in South Africa, established in 1993 advises the National Department of Health on issues pertinent to vaccination and infectious diseases. It makes recommendations on vaccine formulations and vaccination schedules.
