= Centre for Theoretical Cosmology =

Research facility at the University of Cambridge

Coordinates: 52.21043°N 0.10188°E

- Formation: 2007
- Founder: Stephen Hawking
- Headquarters: University of Cambridge
- Website: https://ctc.cam.ac.uk/

The Centre for Theoretical Cosmology (Hawkings CTC) is a research centre within the Department of Applied Mathematics and Theoretical Physics at the University of Cambridge. Founded by Stephen Hawking in 2007, it encourages new thinking on some of the most challenging problems in science, aiming to advance scientific understanding of the universe.

== History ==
The Centre for Theoretical Cosmology at the University of Cambridge was founded in 2007 by Stephen Hawking and is housed within the Department of Applied Mathematics and Theoretical Physics.
