= Amandla (novel) =

1980 novel by Miriam Tlali

- Author: Miriam Tlali
- Language: English
- Publisher: Ravan Press
- Publication date: 1980

Amandla is a 1980 historical fiction novel by the South African writer Miriam Tlali. It is a fiction about real events: the 1976 Soweto revolt and massacre. In this revolt, young people from Soweto (a Johannesburg suburb) rose up against the decision to make Afrikaans compulsory as a means of teaching in black schools.

== Context ==
Published in 1980 by the South African anti-apartheid publisher Ravan Press, Amandla was the second English-language novel written by a black woman in apartheid South Africa. The first novel was Muriel at Metropolitan, which is also known as Between Two Worlds by Tlali. The novel Amandla was banned after its publication.

It is one of four novels considered "Soweto novels", works of fiction depicting the June 1976 uprising. The others are Mongane Serote's To Every Birth its Blood (1981), Sipho Sepamla's A Ride on the Whirlwind (1981), and Mbulelo Mzamane's The Children of Soweto (1982).

== Plot ==
"Amandla" is written from the perspective of various young revolutionaries of the time. Based on Tlali's experience as a Soweto resident in 1976, the novel depicts the uprising and its aftermath. Critics have highlighted three points about this novel:

- The way the author highlights Black Consciousness Movement's anti-apartheid activism.
- Tlali's description of gender relations between men and women activists, and within the community in general.
- The technique with which the novel integrates other discourses: dialogues, debates, speeches, pamphlets, interviews (as in Tlali's later novels Mihloti and Soweto Stories), as well as conversations Tlali had with people who came to her to tell her their stories of life in the townships.
