= Ingrid Woolard =

South African economist (born 1970)

- Born: South Africa

Academic background
- Education: University of KwaZulu-Natal (B.Sc.); University of South Africa (B.A.(Hons)); University of Cape Town (Ph.D.)

Academic work
- Discipline: Public economics Labour economics
- Institutions: University of Sussex Business School
- Notable ideas: Lead author of the chapter on inequality for the prestigious International Panel on Social Progress; Chair of the Employment Conditions Commission (ECC) from 2011 to 2014; Member of the Davis Tax Committee since 2013; PI of South Africa's national household panel survey, the National Income Dynamics Study (NIDS), since 2007; Member of the Panel of Experts for the Design of the Expanded Public Works Programme, National Department of Public Works in 2013; Member of the Committee for Evaluation of the Department of Environmental and Water Affairs Public Works Programmes in 2005; Member of the Board of Luxembourg Income Study (LIS) from 2011 onwards External Peer Advisor for the International Initiative for Impact Evaluation from 2011 onwards

Ingrid Woolard is a professor of economics and executive dean of the University of Sussex Business School. She is also honorary professor of economics at Groningen University and the University of Cape Town; a research fellow of the Institute of Labor Economics (IZA) in Bonn, a non-resident senior research fellow at the United Nations University World Institute for Development Economics Research (UNU-WIDER) in Helsinki and a research associate of the Commitment to Equity Institute at Tulane University.

In 2022 Ingrid became a member of the Academy of Science of South Africa. She advised the South African Minister of Labour on working conditions and minimum wages from 2008 to 2014. From 2013 to 2017 she served on the Davis Tax Committee which advised seven consecutive South African Ministers of Finance on tax policy for inclusive growth. Since 2025, she has served on the Presidential Economic Advisory Council to advise President Cyril Ramaphosa in guiding the 7th post-apartheid Administration in its pursuit of rapid, inclusive and sustainable economic growth and job creation. See further information here on the University of Sussex Elements profile page.

== Education ==
Woolard read for a B.Sc. in Mathematical Statistics and Economics from the University of Natal (Durban), and B.A. (Hons) in Economics from UNISA, She then proceeded to the University of Cape Town where she obtained a PhD in economics.

== Career ==
Ingrid was previously the Chair of the Employment Conditions Commission which makes sectoral recommendations in sectors in which collective bargaining is weak (e.g. domestic work, farm work, hospitality and retail). She consults regularly for various South African government departments and international organizations such as the World Bank, the ILO and the OECD. Since 2007, Woolard has been one of the Principal Investigators in the long-running the National Income Dynamics Study (NIDS), South Africa's national household panel survey.

Woolard has been a member of the Davis Tax Committee since 2013.

== Bibliography ==
=== Journal articles ===
Woolard has written dozens of peer-reviewed articles including:

- Ingrid Woolard; Murray Leibbrandt; Arden Finn; Jonathan Argen (2010). "Trends in South African income distribution and poverty since the fall of apartheid" (PDF). OECD Social, Employment and Migration Working Papers (101): 1–93. doi:10.1787/5kmms0t7p1ms-en.
- Ingrid Woolard; Abhijit Banerjee; Sebastian Galiani; Jim Levinsohn; Zoe McLaren (2008). "Why has unemployment risen in the new South Africa?" (PDF). Economics of Transition. 16 (4): 715–740. doi:10.1111/j.1468-0351.2008.00340.x. hdl:2027.42/74834. S2CID 33437467.

Woolard has also written a book entitled:

Fighting Poverty: Labour Markets and Inequality in South Africa. This book was written in 2001 with the help of M. Leibbrandt, H. Bhorat, M. Maziya, and S. van der Berg.
