= Murray Leibbrandt =

Economics professor

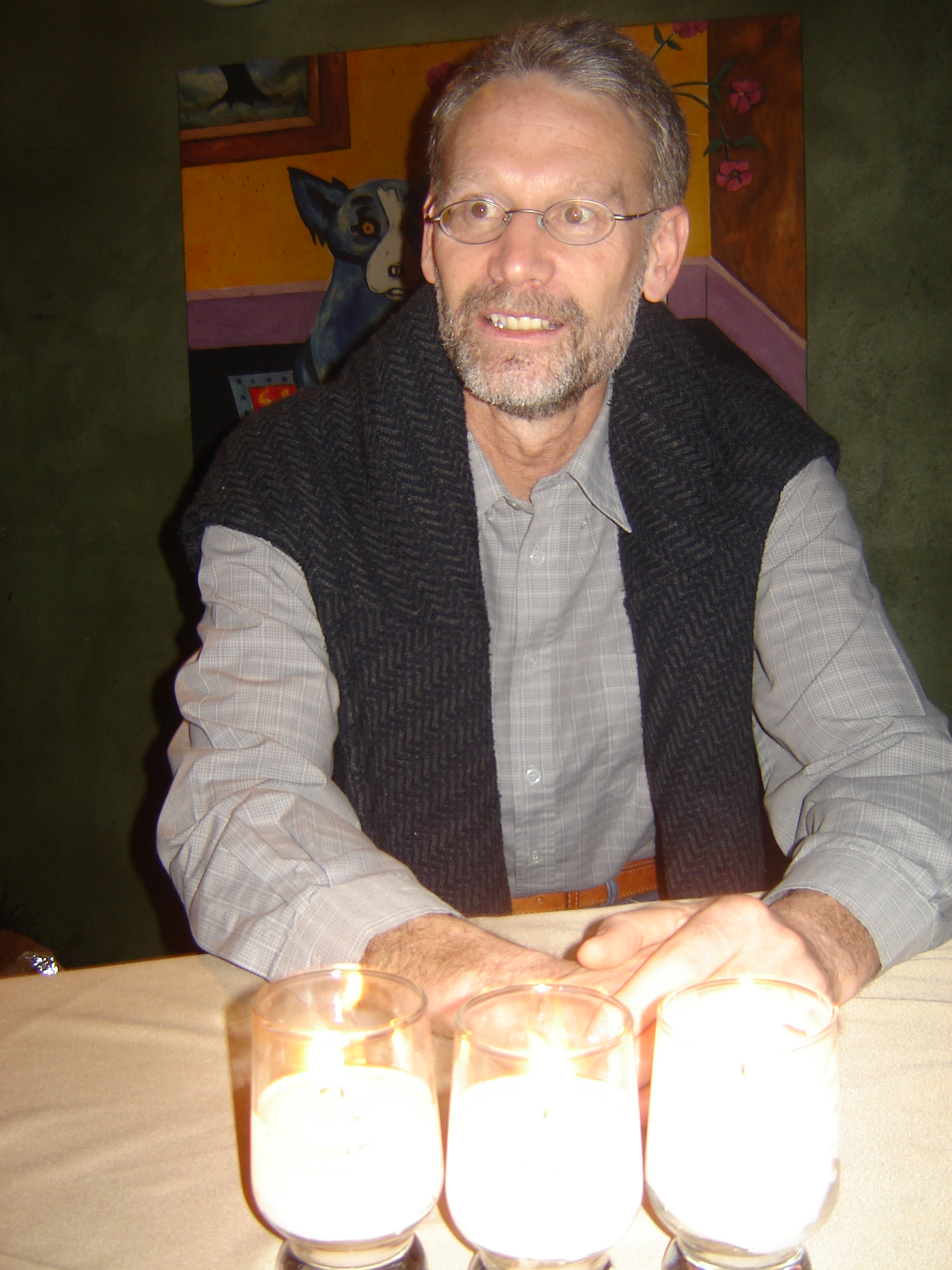

Academic background
- Education: Rhodes University (BA); University of Notre Dame (MA) (Ph.D.)

Academic work
- Discipline: Development economics Labour economics
- Institutions: University of Cape Town

Murray Leibbrandt is professor, NRF Chair in Poverty and Inequality Research - and Director of the Southern Africa Labour and Development Research Unit at the University of Cape Town. He is a South African academic economist studying labour markets, trends in inequality, and poverty in South Africa. He is a fellow at the IZA Institute of Labor Economics.

== Education ==
He received a Bachelors in Economics from Rhodes University in 1983. He then proceeded to University of Notre Dame, where he read for Masters and doctorate degrees, graduating in 1986 and 1993 respectively.

== Academic career ==
In 1999, Leibbrandt with his colleagues - Ingrid Woolard and Haroon Bhorat - conducted a series of studies intended to study the dynamics of inequality in South Africa up to that point. They show that race largely correlates with lower income and inequality, and the reliance of Gauteng, South Africa's economic hub, on migrant labour - to fill its chronic labour shortfall.

Leibbrandt is the Principal Investigator of South Africa’s national household panel survey, the National Income Dynamics Study (NIDS) - which was first published in 2008.
