= National Institute for Communicable Diseases =

South African government health agency

Agency overview
- Preceding agency: National Institute for Virology
- Jurisdiction: South Africa
- Headquarters: 1 Modderfontein Road, Sandringham, Johannesburg
- Parent department: Department of Health
- Website: www.nicd.ac.za

The National Institute for Communicable Diseases (NICD) is the national public health institute of South Africa, providing reference to microbiology, virology, epidemiology, surveillance and public health research to support the government's response to communicable disease threats.

The NICD serves as a resource of knowledge and expertise of communicable diseases to the South African Government, Southern African Development Community countries and the African continent. The institution assists in the planning of policies and programmes to support and respond to communicable diseases.

The main goal of the NICD is to be the national organ for South Africa for public health surveillance of communicable disease.

== Centres ==
- Centre for Emerging Zoonotic and Parasitic Diseases
- Centre for Enteric Diseases
- Centre for Healthcare-Associated Infections, Antimicrobial Resistance and Mycoses
- Centre for HIV and STIs
- Centre for Respiratory Diseases and Meningitis
- Centre for Tuberculosis
- Centre for Vaccines and Immunology
- Public Health Surveillance and Response Division
- National Cancer Registry
- Transversal Functions
  - Division of Biosafety and Biosecurity (DBB)
  - Sequencing Core Facility
