= Wieland Gevers =

South African academic (born 1937)

Wieland Gevers OMS FRSSAf
- Born: 9 October 1937; Piet Retief, Transvaal Province; Union of South Africa

Academic background
- Education: University of Cape Town (MBChB); Balliol College, Oxford (DPhil)
- Doctoral advisor: Hans Krebs

Academic work
- Discipline: Biochemistry
- Institutions: Rockefeller University; University of Stellenbosch; University of Cape Town

Wieland Gevers OMS FRSSAf (born 9 October 1937) is a retired South African biochemist and education administrator. He is emeritus professor of medical biochemistry at the University of Cape Town, where he has taught since 1978. He was a deputy vice-chancellor of the same university between 1992 and 2002.

Gevers is also a former president of the Royal Society of South Africa and Academy of Science of South Africa, as well as the founding president of the South African Biochemical Society.

== Early life and education ==
Gevers was born on 9 October 1937 in Piet Retief in the former Transvaal Province. He matriculated in 1954 at Nigel High School in Nigel on the East Rand, and he was the top matriculant in the province that year. He enrolled at the University of Cape Town (UCT) the following year.

In 1960, he graduated from UCT with an MBChB in the first class. As the best graduate in his cohort, he received the University Gold Medal and the Sir Robert Kotze Scholarship. He was also the president of the Medical Students' Council from 1959 to 1960. After graduating he worked briefly as an intern at Groote Schuur Hospital and as a volunteer at the Red Cross Children's Hospital.

Between 1960 and 1966, he studied biochemistry at Oxford University, completing a BA (Hons) and, with the support of a Rhodes Scholarship, a DPhil. His doctoral supervisor at Oxford was Hans Krebs, and his research concerned futile cycling of carbon.

== Academic career ==
From 1969 to 1970, Gevers joined Rockefeller University in New York City as a Helen Hay Whitney Fellow. He remained there until 1970, working in Fritz Lipmann's lab; with Horst Kleinkauf, he researched non-ribosomal biosynthesis of peptide antibiotics. He returned to South Africa later in 1970 and spent a brief period in the department of chemical pathology at UCT.

Between 1971 and 1977, he lived in Stellenbosch, appointed as professor of medical biochemistry at the University of Stellenbosch. He founded the university's department of medical biochemistry, and he was also the founding director of the university's research unit for molecular and cellular cardiology, funded by the Medical Research Council (MRC).

In 1978, he returned to UCT as a professor, tasked with setting up another department of medical biochemistry. During his two decades in the department, he was the director of three different MRC-funded research units: one for muscle research, one for the cell biology of atherosclerosis, and another for molecular and cellular biology. He was also a visiting professor of pathology at the University of Chicago in 1984 and a member of the editorial board of the Journal of Molecular and Cellular Cardiology from 1971 to 1993.

== Administrative career ==
After acting as deputy vice-chancellor at UCT from 1990 to 1991, Gevers was permanently appointed as deputy vice-chancellor for academic affairs from 1992 to 2002. His duties included representing the university sector at SAQA, and he also helped found the Cape Higher Education Consortium.

He retired at the end of 2002, but nonetheless remained at UCT: from 2003 to 2005, he was the interim director of the Institute of Infectious Disease and Molecular Medicine (IIDMM) ahead of the institute's official launch. Thereafter, in his retirement, Gevers continued to serve voluntarily in professional service roles.

== Professional associations and honours ==
During his time as a professor, Gevers served on several bodies of the MRC and Council for Scientific and Industrial Research, including as the South African delegate to the International Union of Biochemistry and Molecular Biology from 1973 to 1994. He was also the founding president of the South African Biochemical Society. He was the president of Royal Society of South Africa from 1987 to 1989 (having been a member since 1979) and the president of the Academy of Science of South Africa from 1998 to 2004 (having been a member since 1996). In 2002, he became a fellow of the World Academy of Sciences.

Awards held by Gevers include a lifetime achievement award from the National Science and Technology Forum in 2004, the Suid-Afrikaanse Akademie vir Wetenskap en Kuns M. T. Steyn Medal in 2006, and the Southern African Association for the Advancement of Science's South Africa Medal in 2007. For his professional service, he received a silver medal from the MRC in 1990, a gold medal from Wellcome in 1991, gold medals from the MRC and South African Biochemical Society in 1994, and another gold medal from the Academy of Science in 2008. He received UCT's Distinguished Teachers Award in 1982 and became a life fellow of the university in 1984. He also holds honorary doctorates from UCT, the University of Port Elizabeth, and University of Stellenbosch.

In October 2008, President Kgalema Motlanthe inducted Gevers into the Order of Mapungubwe, granting him the award in silver for "His excellent contribution to the field of Higher Education and medicine."

== Personal life ==
He is married to Elizabeth Ellen Gevers (née Hurst) and has four children.
