= Valerie Mizrahi =

South African biologist

- Born: 1958 (age 67–68); Salisbury, Rhodesia (now Zimbabwe)
- Citizenship: South African
- Known for: Tuberculosis
- Awards: L'Oréal-UNESCO Award, 2000 Order of Mapungubwe, 2007 Christophe Mérieux Prize, 2013
- Scientific career
- Fields: Molecular biology

Valerie Mizrahi FRS (born 1958) is a South African molecular biologist.

== Biography ==
The daughter of Morris and Etty Mizrahi, she was born in Harare, Zimbabwe and was educated there. Her family is a Sephardi Jewish family from the Greek island of Rhodes.

== Career ==
She went on to earn a BSc in chemistry and mathematics and then a PhD in chemistry at the University of Cape Town. From 1983 to 1986, she pursued post-doctoral studies at Pennsylvania State University. Mizrahi then worked in research and development for pharmaceutical company Smith, Kline & French. In 1989, she established as research unit at the South African Institute for Medical Research and University of the Witwatersrand, remaining there until 2010. Her research has been focused on the treatment of tuberculosis, and drug resistance. In 2011, she became director of the Institute of Infectious Disease and Molecular Medicine at the University of Cape Town. Mizrahi is director of a research unit of the South African Medical Research Council and leads the University of Cape Town branch of the Centre of Excellence in Biomedical TB Research.

Mizrahi received the L'Oréal-UNESCO Award for Women in Science in 2000. In 2006, she received the Gold Medal from the South African Society for Biochemistry and Molecular Biology for her contributions to the field and the Department of Science and Technology's Distinguished Woman Scientist Award. She is a fellow of the Royal Society of South Africa, a member of the Academy of Science of South Africa and a fellow of the American Academy of Microbiology since 2009. She was named to the Order of Mapungubwe in 2007. From 2000 to 2010, she was an International Research Scholar of the Howard Hughes Medical Institute; in 2012, she was named a Senior International Research Scholar for the Institute until 2017. In 2013, she was awarded the Institut de France's Christophe Mérieux Prize for her work in tuberculosis research. Mizrahi was elected a Fellow of the Royal Society in 2023. and a Foreign Associate of the United States of America's National Academy of Sciences in 2026.

== Honours and awards ==
- 2000: L'Oréal-UNESCO Awards for Women in Science
- 2007: Order of Mapungubwe - Silver
- 2013: Christophe Mérieux Prize
- 2018: Harry Oppenheimer Fellowship Award
- 2023: American Association for the Advancement of Science Fellow
- 2023: Elected Fellow of the Royal Society
- 2026: Elected International Member of National Academy of Sciences (USA)

== Personal life ==
Valerie has two daughters, and her father is the honorary president of the Johannesburg Sephardic Hebrew Congregation. She grew up speaking Judeo-Spanish at home.

== Publications ==
- Effects of Pyrazinamide on Fatty Acid Synthesis by Whole Mycobacterial Cells and Purified Fatty Acid Synthase I. Helena I. Boshoff, Valerie Mizrahi, Clifton E. Barry. Journal of Bacteriology, 2002
- The impact of drug resistance on Mycobacterium tuberculosis physiology: what can we learn from rifampicin?. Anastasia Koch, Valerie Mizrahi, Digby F Warner. Emerging Microbes & Infections, 2014
