= Mike Wingfield =

South African professor of forestry

Professor Mike Wingfield FAAS FRSSAf
- Born: Michael John Wingfield; 21 April 1954 (age 72); Durban, Natal, South Africa
- Education: University of Natal (BSC); Stellenbosch University (MSc); University of Minnesota (PhD); Harvard Business School (AMP)
- Spouse: Brenda Wingfield
- Awards: Christiaan Hendrik Persoon Medal (1999); Chancellor's Medal Award, University of Pretoria (2008); Johanna Westerdijk Award (2012); Kwame Nkrumah Award (2013); Distinguished Leadership Award, University of Minnesota (2016); John F.W. Herschel Medal (2017); Friendship Award (China) (2017); NSTF-South32 Award (2020); Harry Oppenheimer Fellowship Award (2022)
- Scientific career
- Fields: Forest protection; mycology; entomology; biotechnology
- Institutions: FABI, University of Pretoria; IUFRO; Stellenbosch University; University of the Free State
- Thesis: Ecology of the pine wood nematode, Bursaphelenchus xylophilus in the north-central United States (1983)

Michael John Wingfield (born 21 April 1954) is a South African academic and scientist who studies plant pathology and biological control. He was the founding director of the Forestry and Agricultural Biotechnology Institute, University of Pretoria. Wingfield has authored or co-authored over 1,000 scientific publications and is considered a leading expert in the field of forest health and invasive species. He has received numerous awards and honours throughout his career, including Harry Oppenheimer Fellowship Award and John Herschel Medal, the highest accolade from the Royal Society of South Africa. He is also a Fellow of the Royal Society of South Africa and the African Academy of Sciences. Wingfield has had several fungi named after him.

== Life and career ==
=== Early life and education ===
Michael "Mike" John Wingfield was born on 21 April 1954 in Durban, South Africa. He earned a Bachelor of Science in Botany from the University of Natal in 1976, before completing a Master of Science in plant pathology while working for the Plant Protection Research Institute of Stellenbosch University, in 1979, graduating with distinction. He earned his doctorate in entomology and plant pathology from the University of Minnesota in 1983. Wingfield also graduated from the Advanced Management Program at Harvard Business School in Boston, Massachusetts, in 2008.

=== Career ===
While working at the Plant Protection Research Institute of Stellenbosch University, Wingfield started the country's first forest pathology research programme in 1978. After earning his PhD, he continued the program's expansion. In 1990, Wingfield was promoted to professor in the Department of Microbiology and Biochemistry at the University of the Free State after relocating there in 1988. Wingfield was named the Mondi Paper Co. Ltd. Chair in forest pathology in 1994.

Wingfield was the founding director of the Forestry and Agricultural Biotechnology Institute (FABI), University of Pretoria, in until 2017. FABI was founded in 1998 due to Wingfield's work in 1990 to create the Tree Protection Co-operative Programme. He continued as a professor at FABI and an advisor to the Executive Board of the University of Pretoria.

Wingfield was the director of the Centre of Excellence in Tree Health Biotechnology, National Research Foundation, and the President of the International Union of Forest Research Organizations (IUFRO) between 2014 and 2019. His collaboration with Chinese academics led to the formation of the CERC/FABI Tree Protection Programme (CFTPP), a joint venture between the FABI and the China Eucalyptus Research Centre (CERC), in 2015. CFTPP was renamed to RIFT-FABI Tree Protection Programme (RFTPP).

=== Personal life ===
Wingfield is married to Brenda D. Fairbairn, one of his main collaborators, a professor of genetics and previous Deputy Dean at the University of Pretoria, and an Associate Fellow of the African Academy of Sciences since 2016.

== Research ==
Wingfield's research focuses on forest protection and health, mycology, entomology, and biotechnology. He has worked on several projects and partnerships studying diseases that affect pine, eucalyptus, and other significant plants. He, along with his students and collaborators worked on various pathogens, including Ceratocystis, Ophiostoma, Mycosphaerella, Fusarium, Cryphonectria, and Armillaria species. His team has used traditional and molecular approaches to classify and distinguish infections, define a novel, sometimes cryptic species, and determine evolutionary connections.

Wingfield is an expert on plants' health with an h-index of 120 and more than 69,000 citations as of August 2023, over 700 research papers and seven books. He has been featured in the Web of Science list of the world's most-cited researchers since 2018.

== Awards and honours ==
Wingfield is a member of the Academy of Science of South Africa. He was elected a Fellow of the Royal Society of South Africa in 1998, and a Fellow of the African Academy of Sciences in 2016.

For his contributions and collaboration in the field of forestry, Wingfield was awarded the Christiaan Hendrik Persoon Medal by the Southern African Society for Plant Pathology Society (SASPPS) in 1999, the Johanna Westerdijk Award from the CBS-KNAW Fungal Biodiversity Centre, Netherlands in 2012, the African Union Kwame Nkrumah Award for Scientific Excellence in 2013, the University of Minnesota's Distinguished Leadership Award in 2016, John Herschel Medal, the highest accolade from the Royal Society of South Africa, in 2017, the Chinese Government's Friendship Award in 2017, National Science and Technology Forum-South32's Special Annual Theme Award: Plant Health on 30 July 2020, and Harry Oppenheimer Fellowship Award in 2022.

Wingfield received an honorary doctorate of science (DSc) from the University of British Columbia in 2012, and the North Carolina State University in 2013.

Wingfield has several fungi named in his honour: Sterigmatomyces wingfieldii Van der Walt, Y.Yamada & N.P.Ferreira (1987); Leptographium wingfieldii M.Morelet (1988); Asterina wingfieldii Hosag., N.P.Balakr. & Goos (1996); Catenulostroma wingfieldii Crous (2008); and Gondwanamyces wingfieldii Roets & Dreyer (2012). Racheliella wingfieldiana Crous & U.Braun (2018) was named after his first grandchild, Rachel.
