= Christian Walter Werner Pirk =

German behavioural and chemical ecologist in South Africa

- Born: Berlin
- Education: Rhodes University, Grahamstown, South Africa
- Scientific career
- Thesis: Reproductive conflicts in honeybees
- Doctoral advisor: Randall Hepburn Sarah Radloff
- Website: https://www.up.ac.za/zoology-entomology/view/staffprofile/3137

Christian Pirk, born in Berlin, is a German behavioural and chemical ecologist in the Department of Zoology & Entomology at the University of Pretoria. Together with Abdullahi Yusuf, he is leading the Social Insects Research Group, which was founded by Prof Robin Crewe. Like Yusuf and Prof Sole, he is a member of the Forestry and Agricultural Biotechnology Institute (FABI).

Prof Pirk has published over 180 peer-reviewed articles, several book chapters and the book "Honeybee Nests – Composition, Structure, Function" and received in recognition of the work a B-rating from the National Research Foundation of South Africa. His research encompasses behavioural, chemical, evolutionary and molecular ecology with a focus on social insects and communication.

He was elected to the Academy of Science of South Africa in 2015; he serves on the council since 2020 and in 2024 took over the task of secretary general of the academy. Pirk was the focal point for workshops on neonicotinoids in 2018 and 2019 which resulted in a report on neonicotinoids in Africa and a policy recommendation published by ASSAf.

He is also an elected member of the African Academy of Science.

He was vice president of the Entomological Society of Southern Africa from 2017 to 2021 and is involved in a number of E-COST Actions, like BesafebeeHoney (CA22105) where he present the keynote in the Session "The Buzz on Biotic Threats" or COLOSS in the past. He was elected to the management committee of the COLOSS Network, a former cost action, in 2016, and since being re-elected every term, he is currently serving as Vice president.

== Biography ==
Pirk did his PhD in entomology from 2000–2002 under the supervision of Profs Randall Hepburn and Sarah Radloff at Rhodes University, Makhanda (former Grahamstown), South Africa. His PhD was funded by the DAAD (German Academic Exchange Service).

He moved to the University of Würzburg for a postdoc, joining Prof Jürgen Tautz's group in 2002. After two years, he joined Prof Robin Moritz's group at the Martin Luther University Halle Wittenberg.

In 2005, he moved to Pretoria, South Africa, to join the Social Insects Research Group at the University of Pretoria under the leadership of Prof Robin Crewe, deputy vice chancellor for research at that time. His Claude Leon fellowship, which he received in 2008, was cut short since he joined as a Senior Lecturer the Department of Zoology & Entomology in 2009 and holds the position of a full professor since 2015.

He received the Exceptional Young Achiever Award of the University of Pretoria in 2012 and the Exceptional Achiever: Academic Achievements Award in 2022.
