= George Ekama =

South African civil engineer (1949–2023)

George Ekama OMS FRSSAf
- Born: George Adriaan Ekama; 17 June 1949; Hilversum, Netherlands
- Died: 19 February 2023 (aged 73)
- Spouse: Janet Ekama
- Children: Kate Ekama

Academic background
- Education: University of Cape Town
- Thesis: The dynamic behaviour of the activated sludge process (1978)
- Doctoral advisor: Gerrit Marais

Academic work
- Discipline: Civil engineering
- Sub-discipline: Environmental engineering
- Institutions: University of Cape Town
- Main interests: Wastewater treatment Biological nutrient removal Resource recovery modelling

George Adriaan Ekama OMS FRSSAf (17 June 1949 – 19 February 2023) was a Dutch–South African civil engineer who was an expert on wastewater treatment. Throughout his career he worked at the University of Cape Town, where he was professor of water quality engineering. He was a distinguished fellow of the International Water Association.

== Life and career ==
Ekama was born on 17 June 1949 in Hilversum in the Netherlands. His family emigrated to South Africa during the 1950s, and he studied civil engineering at the University of Cape Town. His grandfather, father, and elder brother were also engineers. After completing his bachelor's degree, he repaid his bursary by working for several years; he was employed by the contractor that was building the container quay at the Cape Town Harbour.

At the same time, he took evening classes, and in that context he met Gerrit Marais, a professor at the University of Cape Town who became his mentor. Upon the completion of his work contract, Ekama returned to the University of Cape Town full-time as a master's student. He worked in Marais's research group, which was working on biological nutrient removal as an alternative to chemical nutrient removal in wastewater treatment processes. His master's was upgraded to a Ph.D. in engineering, awarded in 1978.

After his graduation, he remained at the university, initially as a soft-funded research officer. He was promoted to Professor of Water Quality Engineering in 1991 and retained that position for the rest of his career. In addition, he was head of the Department of Civil Engineering between 2003 and 2007. He was also a regular visitor at the Hong Kong University of Science and Technology, taught regular specialist courses at the IHE Delft Institute for Water Education, and spent sabbaticals at Virginia Tech and the University of Padua.

== Scholarship ==
At the University of Cape Town, Ekama joined and later led the Department of Civil Engineering's highly acclaimed Water Research Group. Although he was never formally trained in chemical engineering, his work was heavily dependent on biochemical engineering. The Water Research Group continued his and Marais's research into the treatment of municipal and industrial wastewater, with particular focus on extending their work on biological nutrient removal and related modelling. This work was incorporated into international activated sludge models. Ekama himself published over 100 journal articles, and in 2006 he received an A1-rating from the National Research Foundation. Thomson Reuters identified him as a Highly Cited Researcher.

== Honours and awards ==
A member of the International Water Association (IWA) since 1984, Ekama was a member of several specialist IWA groups. He received the IWA Project Innovation Award in 2012 and he was named as an IWA Distinguished Fellow in 2017. The Academy of Science of South Africa named him as a 'Legend of South African Science' in 2017, and the Water Research Commission likewise honoured him as a 'Legend' in 2021. In January 2023 in Stellenbosch, the 8th IWA Water Resource Recovery Modelling Seminar featured a gala dinner in his honour.

On Freedom Day in 2013, President Jacob Zuma admitted Ekama to the Order of Mapungubwe, granting him the award in silver for:

His excellent research that has provided innovative solutions to enhancing and improving wastewater treatment. His important work is helping the country to find solutions to water scarcity.

He was also a fellow of the Royal Society of South Africa, a fellow of the South African Academy of Engineers, a fellow of the University of Cape Town, and a senior fellow of the Water Institute of Southern Africa.

== Personal life and retirement ==
Ekama retired in 2017 and became an emeritus professor, though he continued his research until he suffered a severe stroke in 2020. He died on 19 February 2023, aged 73.

He was Christian, and he was also an avid marathon runner; he completed one Comrades Marathon and several Two Oceans Marathons. He was married to Janet Ekama and had one child, a daughter named Kate. Kate is an economist at the University of Stellenbosch.

== See also ==
- Wastewater treatment in South Africa
