= Janice Limson =

South African academic and biotechnologist

- Born: Port Elizabeth, South Africa
- Education: Rhodes University
- Known for: Biotechnological sensors and nanomaterials Biotechnology public communication
- Scientific career
- Doctoral advisor: Tebello Nyokong; Santy Daya

Janice Leigh Limson is a South African Professor of Biotechnology, former Chairperson the School of Biotechnology at Rhodes University and the SARChI Chair in Biotechnology Innovation & Engagement at Rhodes University. She is founder and editor-in-chief of the magazine Science in Africa, the first popular online science magazine for Africa. Her research focuses on topics ranging from the development of nanotechnology biosensors for cancer diagnostics, drug delivery, detection of pathogens in food to the design of fuel cell technology.

== Education and career ==
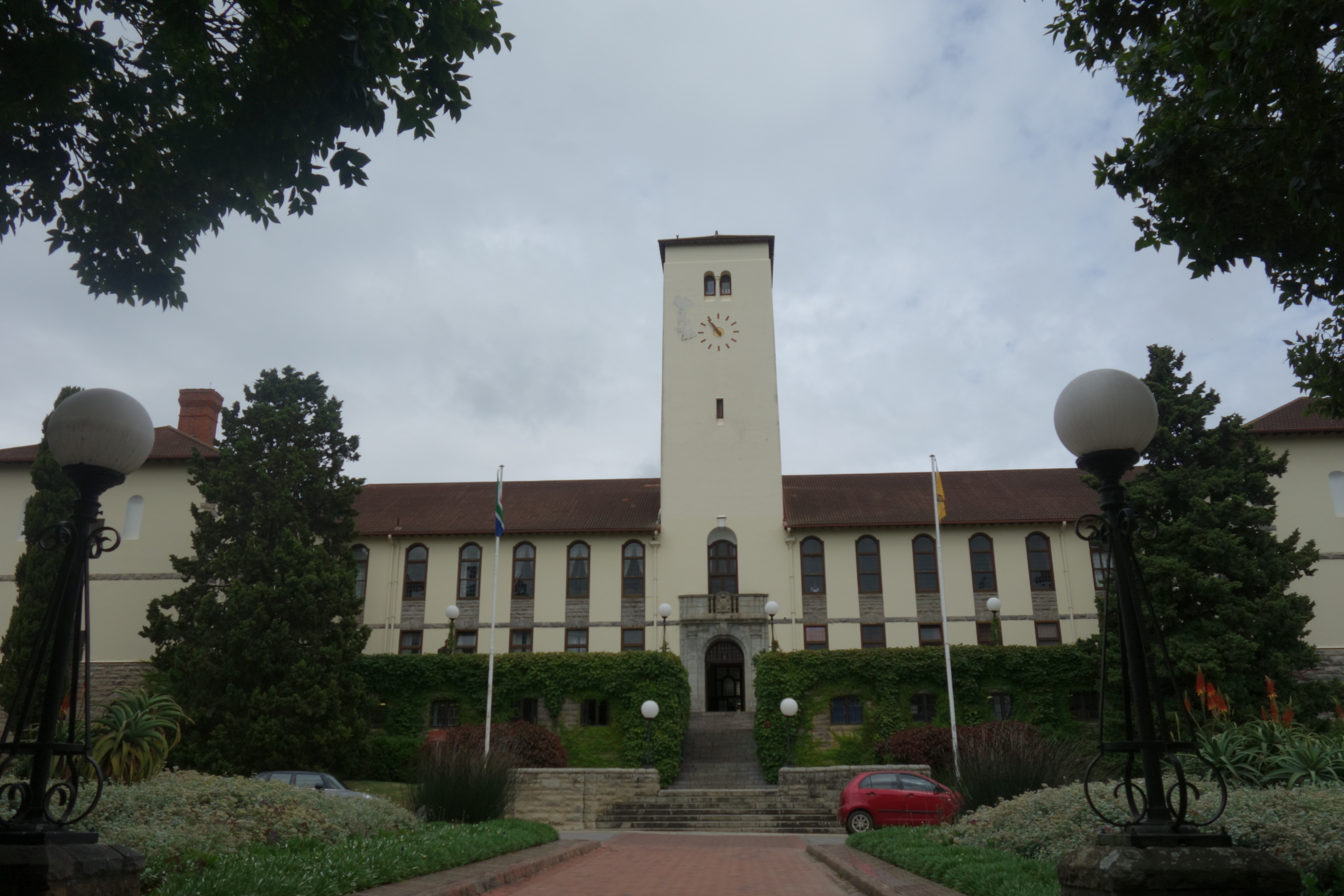
Rhodes University clock tower, 2018

Limson grew up in Port Elizabeth, South Africa. She subsequently moved to Grahamstown, and she studied at Rhodes University where she completed her BSc (Honours) in 1994. In 1997 she was awarded a PhD in Chemistry at Rhodes University. She completed a Postgraduate diploma in Tertiary education from 2006 to 2008.

In 1999 Limson was a postdoctoral research fellow at the University of Texas Health Science Center at San Antonio. The next year she founded the online magazine Science in Africa and became its editor in chief. The magazine aims to serve "as a platform for scientists in a broad range of fields in Africa to report on their research, giving their expert views on topical issues in science and providing the right information to an African public seeking a deeper understanding of science and of the dynamic role it plays in everyone's lives."

In 2003 Limson established the BioSENS (Sensors, Energy and Nanomaterials) Research Group at Rhodes for the development of nanotechnology biosensors for cancer diagnostics and drug delivery. The establishment in 2007 of the DST/Mintek-sponsored Nanotechnology Innovation Centre at the University of the Western Cape, University of Johannesburg and Rhodes University greatly assisted this research.

From 2003 until 2009 Limson was a lecturer at Rhodes university, and in 2010 she was appointed Associate Professor at Rhodes. She also received the Vice-Chancellor's Distinguished Research Award in that year for "the volume and impact of her research outputs". In 2011 she became Chairperson of the Rhodes University School of Biotechnology. In 2014 she was awarded Professor of Biotechnology and was appointed Director of Rhodes University Biotechnology Innovation Centre. The Centre has since launched its first products, catalysts for sensors, and is working on sensors for CD4 and malaria in a partnership with UNICEF and the South African Medical Research Council.

In 2015 she was appointed to the DSI/NRF South African Research Chairs Initiative (SARChI) Chair in Biotechnology Innovation & Engagement at Rhodes.

In March 2019 she contributed to a series of public lectures on "Truth and Trustworthiness in Science" co-ordinated by the ASSAf and the British High Commission in South Africa. The discussion she was involved with was entitled: "Misunderstandings and Misuses: Science Journalism".

Limson is the editor of the South African Agency for Science and Technology Advancement (SAASTA) Nanotechnology Public Engagement Programme’s newsletter, called Nanotech Public Engagement, and is a fellow of The African Academy of Sciences.

== Awards and recognition ==
Limson has received numerous awards, including:

- 2011 Department of Science and Technology Women in Science Awards in the Life Sciences. First Runner Up
- 2010 Vice-Chancellor's Distinguished Research Medal, Rhodes University
- 2010 M&G Top Young South Africans To Take To Lunch!
- 2009 M&G Top Young South Africans To Take To Lunch!
- 2002 NSTF Awards for Outstanding Contribution to Science, Engineering & Technology, South Africa
- 2001 Highway Africa “Innovative use of New Media in Africa” Journalism Award.

== Selected publications ==
=== Journals ===
- Fogel, Ronen; Limson, Janice (2 February 2016). "Developing Biosensors in Developing Countries: South Africa as a Case Study". Biosensors. 6 (1). MDPI AG: 5. doi:10.3390/bios6010005. ISSN 2079-6374. PMC 4810397. PMID 26848700.
- Limson, Janice (15 December 2018). "Putting responsible research and innovation into practice: a case study for biotechnology research, exploring impacts and RRI learning outcomes of public engagement for science students". Synthese. 198. Springer Science and Business Media LLC: 4685–4710. doi:10.1007/s11229-018-02063-y. ISSN 0039-7857. S2CID 255067039.
- Fogel, R.; Limson, J.L. (2011). "Probing fundamental film parameters of immobilized enzymes—Towards enhanced biosensor performance. Part I—QCM-D mass and rheological measurements". Enzyme and Microbial Technology. 49 (2). Elsevier BV: 146–152. doi:10.1016/j.enzmictec.2011.05.011. ISSN 0141-0229. PMID 22112401.
- Ho, Lance St. John; Limson, Janice L.; Fogel, Ronen (26 March 2019). "Certain Methods of Electrode Pretreatment Create Misleading Responses in Impedimetric Aptamer Biosensors". ACS Omega. 4 (3). American Chemical Society (ACS): 5839–5847. doi:10.1021/acsomega.9b00075. ISSN 2470-1343.
- Kruid, Jan; Fogel, Ronen; Limson, Janice (18 September 2018). "Unsubstituted metallophthalocyanine catalysts for the removal of endocrine disrupting compounds using H2O2 as oxidant". Environmental Science and Pollution Research. 25 (32). Springer Science and Business Media LLC: 32346–32357. Bibcode:2018ESPR...2532346K. doi:10.1007/s11356-018-3215-4. ISSN 0944-1344. PMID 30229492. S2CID 52297638.

=== Books ===
- Limson, Janice (2019). "Engaging the public in scientific research: Models, prospects and challenges from the perspective of scientists". In Weingart, Peter; Joubert, Marina; Falade, Bankole (eds.). SCIENCE COMMUNICATION IN SOUTH AFRICA: Reflections on Current Issues (PDF). Somerset West: African Minds. pp. 19–44. ISBN 978-1-928502-04-3.
