= Pragasen Pillay =

South African engineer (born 1958)

Pragasen Pillay OMS

Academic background
- Education: University of Durban-Westville (B.Eng.); University of Natal (M.S.); Virginia Tech (Ph.D.)

Academic work
- Discipline: Electrical engineering
- Sub-discipline: Power engineering Renewable energy technology
- Institutions: Newcastle University (1988–1990); University of New Orleans (1990–1995); Clarkson University (1995–2007); Concordia University (2008–present)

Pragasen Pillay OMS (born 1958) is a South African electrical engineer known for his research in power engineering and renewable energy technology. He has been a professor at Concordia University since 2008. Before that, he was a professor at Clarkson University from 1995 to 2007. He was appointed as an honorary professor at the University of Cape Town in 2017.

== Education ==
Pillay was born in 1958. From 1978 to 1983, he studied electrical engineering at present-day University of KwaZulu-Natal. He completed a B.Eng. in 1981 at the University of Durban–Westville, supported by a scholarship from Anglo American, and then completed an M.S. in 1983 at the University of Natal, supported by the Council for Scientific and Industrial Research. While a student, he was a trainee engineer at Mondi SA in 1980 and an electrical engineer at the Electricity Supply Commission of South Africa in 1984.

Later in 1984, he moved to Blacksburg, Virginia to pursue his Ph.D. in electrical engineering at the Virginia Polytechnic Institute and State University. His research was supported by a Fulbright Scholarship and was completed in 1987. He was inducted into Phi Kappa Phi in Virginia. In later years he was certified as a chartered electrical engineer in the United Kingdom and a registered professional engineer in Ontario, Canada.

== Academic career ==
Between 1988 and 1990, he was a lecturer at Newcastle University in Newcastle upon Tyne, England. In August 1990, he returned to the United States as a lecturer at the University of New Orleans, a position he held for the next five years. During that time he was associate director of the university's Center for the Application of Power and Instrumentation from 1990 to 1993 and then the director of the centre's Industry Applications and Energy Conversion programme from 1993 to 1995. On the side he did consulting work: while in Newcastle he consulted for British Gas, Sevcon, and Pakcenter, and in the United States he consulted for the Kollmorgen Corporation, Certek Corporation, Entergy Enterprises, and Powertronics. He also visited the Oak Ridge National Laboratory as research faculty in the summer of 1994.

Between August 1995 and August 2007, he was the Jean Newell Distinguished Professor in Engineering at Clarkson University in Potsdam, New York; he was tenured as a professor of electrical and chemical engineering in 1997. During that time he was the Danfoss Visiting Professor at Aalborg University in Denmark in 2001.

In January 2008, Pillay joined Concordia University in Montréal, Canada as a professor. From 2009 to 2020, he held a Senior Industrial Research Chair co-sponsored by the Natural Sciences and Engineering Research Council and Hydro-Québec. At Concordia, he is a member of the Power Engineering and Energy Research Group. He is particularly well known for his research on power engineering and renewable energy technologies.

Alongside his appointment in Canada, in January 2017 he was appointed as an honorary professor in electrical engineering at the University of Cape Town, where he had served as an adjunct professor in the Department of Electrical Engineering since January 1999.

== Honours and awards ==
Pillay has served in various positions in committees of the Institute of Electrical and Electronics Engineers (IEEE), and he won prize paper awards from the association in 1987 and 2003. In 2005 the IEEE Industry Applications Society (IAS) named him as an IEEE IAS Fellow for his contributions to switched reluctance and permanent magnet motor drives. In later years he was named as an IEEE IAS Distinguished Lecturer in 2012 to 2013 and as IEE IAS Prominent Lecturer in 2014 to 2015. In 2015 he won the IAS Outstanding Achievement Award. In 2026, he was announced as the recipient of the 2027 IEEE Nikola Tesla Award.

In South Africa, he won the 2006 T. W. Kambule Award for Senior Black Researchers, presented by the South African National Science and Technology Forum and sponsored by the National Research Foundation. On 28 October 2008, South African President Kgalema Motlanthe inducted him into the Order of Mapungubwe, awarding him the prize in silver "For his excellent achievement in and contribution to the field of energy conservation." He is also a member of the Academy of Science of South Africa, as well as a fellow of the United Kingdom's Institution of Engineering and Technology.
