= Patricia Berjak =

South African botanist (1939–2015)

Patricia Berjak FRSSAf
- Born: 29 December 1939
- Died: 21 January 2015 (aged 75)
- Education: University of the Witwatersrand; University of Natal
- Scientific career
- Fields: botany

Patricia Berjak FRSSAf (29 December 1939 – 21 January 2015) was a South African botanist known for her work on the biology of plant seeds, especially seed recalcitrance. She was professor for 48 years at the University of Kwazulu-Natal (UKZN).

She earned a B.Sc. degree in biochemistry at the University of the Witwatersrand (1962), then went on to the University of Natal (now UKZN), earning a M.Sc. in mammalian physiology and biochemistry (1966) and PhD in seed biology (1969). She was a member of the Academy of Science of South Africa, and a Fellow of the University of Natal, the Royal Society of South Africa and the Third World Academy of Sciences. She was awarded the Order of Mapungubwe (Silver) in 2006. The standard author abbreviation Berjak is used to indicate this person as the author when citing a botanical name.
