= African Union Kwame Nkrumah Award for Scientific Excellence =

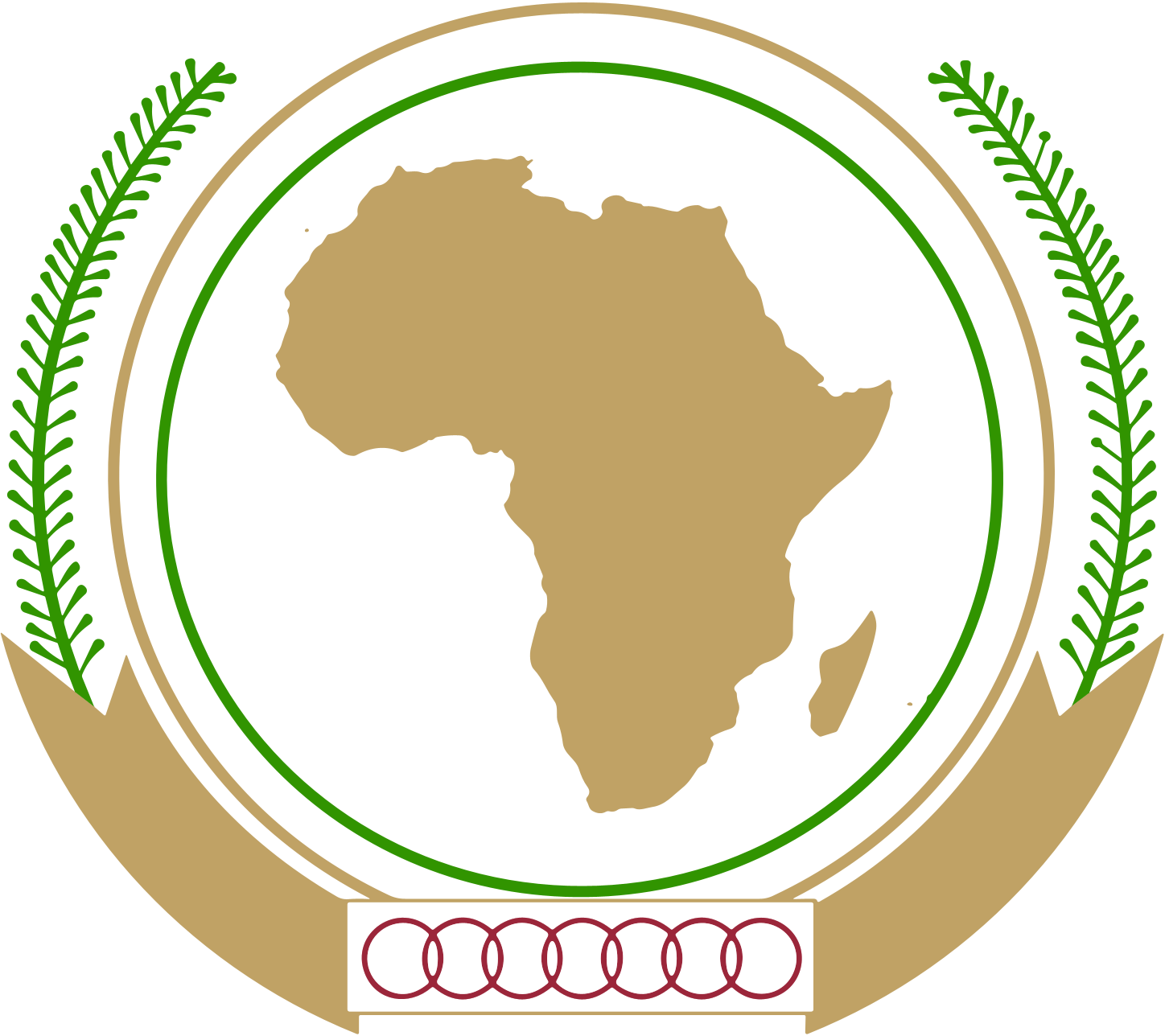
- First award: 2008
- Website: African Union

The African Union Kwame Nkrumah Award for Scientific Excellence was established by the African Union (AU) to recognize and honor outstanding scientific achievements in Africa. These awards were named after Kwame Nkrumah, the first President of Ghana and a prominent Pan-Africanist, who strongly believed in the importance of science and technology for the development of Africa. It is the highest recognition for science in Africa.

The awards aim to recognize and celebrate scientific achievements, promote science and innovation in Africa and inspire the next generation of African scientists. They were established in September 2008.

The Kwame Nkrumah Awards are awarded in two categories: Life and Earth Sciences and Basic Science, Technology and Innovation.

Nominees are typically selected based on their achievements in advancing scientific knowledge, addressing African challenges, and their contributions to the scientific community at large. The awardees are often recognized during AU summits, where they are presented with both a monetary award and a certificate of recognition.

The awards aim to showcase the talent and intellectual contributions of African scientists and play a role in the continent's development by encouraging continued advancements in science and technology.

There are 3 types of awards: At the continental level for general scientists, at the regional level for women scientists and at the national level for young scientists.

The highest level is the Continental award which consists of a cash Prize of USD $100,000, a medal and a certificate.

== Award recipients at the continental level ==
=== Basic Science, Technology and Innovation ===
- 2011: Oluwole Daniel Makinde (Nigeria)
- 2012: Nabil A. Ibrahim (Egypt)
- 2014: Timoleon Crepin Kofane (Cameroon)
- 2015: Tebello Nyokong (South Africa)
- 2016: Ali Ali Hebeish (Egypt)
- 2017: Malik Maaza (Algeria)
- 2018: Obada Abdel Shafy (Egypt)
- 2019: Ahmed Mohammed Alsabagh (Egypt)
- 2020: Salah Obaya (Egypt)

=== Life and Earth Sciences ===
- 2012: Michael John Wingfield (South Africa)
- 2014: Salim Abdool Karim (South Africa)
- 2015: Umezuruike Linus Opara (Nigeria)
- 2016: Felix Dapare Dakora (Ghana)
- 2017: Robert Peter Millar (South Africa)
- 2018: David Mark Richardson (South Africa)
- 2019: Chedly Abdelly (Tunisia)
- 2020: Abraham Aseffa (Ethiopia)

== Award recipients at the regional level ==
This level is awarded to scientist women only.

=== Life and Earth Sciences category ===
- 2010: Salimata Wade (Senegal)
- 2011: Mireille Dosso (Comoros / Ivory Coast)
- 2012: Matilda Steiner-Asiedu (Ghana)
- 2013: Adolé Glitho-Akueson (Togo)
- 2014: Isabella Akyinbah Quakyi (Ghana)
- 2015: Northern Region: Hafida Merzouk (Algeria)
- 2020:
  - Western Region: Philippa C. Ojimelukwe (Nigeria)
  - Eastern Region: Hulda Swai (Tanzania)
  - Northern Region: Elham Mahmoud (Egypt)

=== Basic Science, Technology and Innovation category ===
- 2010: Geneviève Barro (Burkina Faso)
- 2011: Rita Kakou-Yao (Ivory Coast)
- 2013:
  - Quarraisha Abdool Karim (South Africa)
  - Yvonne Bonzi-Coulibaly (Burkina Faso)
- 2015: Eastern Region: Yalemtsehay Mekonnen (Ethiopia)
- 2020:
  - Northern Region: Fakiha Heakal (Egypt)
  - Western Region: Ibiyinka A. Fuwape (Nigeria)

== See also ==
- List of general science and technology awards
