= Brenda Wingfield =

South African Professor of genetics

- Born: Brenda D. Fairbairn
- Education: University of Cape Town; University of Minnesota; Stellenbosch University
- Spouse: Mike Wingfield
- Awards: Christiaan Hendrik Persoon medal Harry Oppenheimer Fellowship Award
- Scientific career
- Workplaces: University of Pretoria

Brenda D. Wingfield is a South African Professor of genetics and previous Deputy Dean of the University of Pretoria. She is known for her genetic studies of fungal tree pathogens.

== Biography ==
Brenda D. Fairbairn was born in Zambia and educated in Zimbabwe. In High School, she found that she enjoyed genetics and went on to study at the University of Natal. She graduated with B.Sc.Hons Med from the University of Cape Town, Master's degree from the University of Minnesota and PhD from the University of Stellenbosch (1989). In the late 1990s, she began to work at the University of Pretoria. She was one of the founding members of the Forestry and Agricultural Biotechnology Institute.

She has published over 400 articles on genetics and trained over 50 both Masters and PhD students respectively. Wingfield holds the South African Research Chairs Initiative (SARChI) Chair in Fungal Genomics.

== Research ==
Wingfield's work centers on fungi that act as tree pathogens. In conjunction with her research, she works with the South African forestry industry.

In 1995 Wingfield studied various species of Armillaria, especially A. cepistipes, A. gallica, A. mellea, and A. tabescens in Europe and North America. In 2004 she along with Michael Wingfield, Pedro Crous and Irene Barnes studied variations of D. septosporum and D. pini and concluded her research on a fact that D. pini is different to D. septosporum. In April of the same year she studied introduction of L. wingfieldii fungi into North America and how it is consumed by various bark beetles such as T. piniperda, D. valens and I. pini. In 2010, she worked as the lead researcher on the team for the first African project working to map the full genome of a fungus that causes pine pitch canker.

== Awards ==
Wingfield was a recipient of the Christiaan Hendrik Persoon medal for her scientific achievements from the Southern African Society for Plant Pathology. She was also the first woman to receive that honor. In 2013, she received an A rating from the National Research Foundation (NRF). She was recognized for her research work by the National Science and Technology Forum in 2014. In 2016 an Oppenheimer Memorial Trust has awarded her with an Harry Oppenheimer Fellowship Award. She was awarded an honorary membership of the Mycological Society of America (MSA) in 2017, she is also a Fellow of the American Phytopathological Society.
