= STEMulator =

Online educational platform

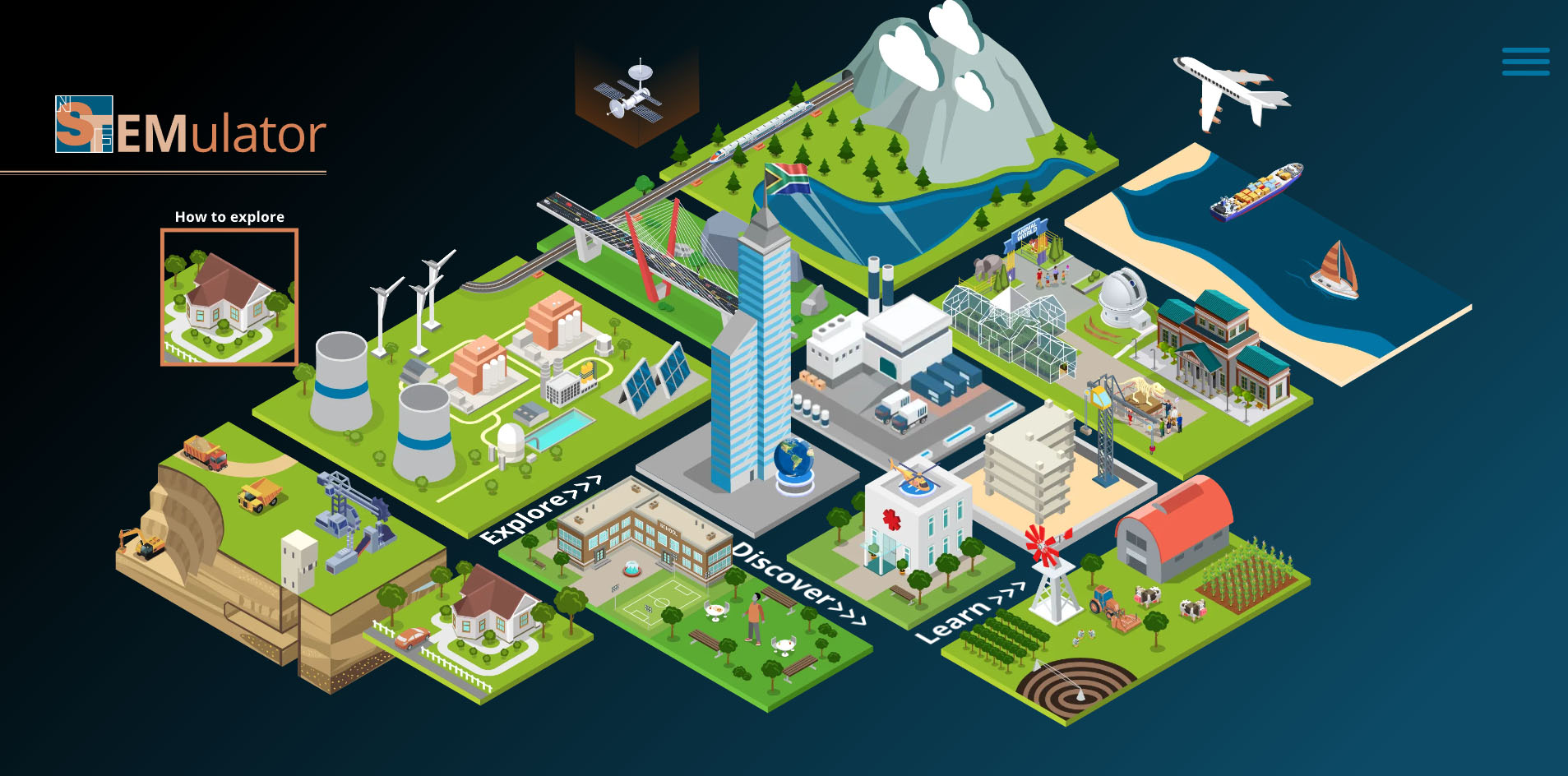
The landing page landscape of the STEMulator website

The STEMulator is an online educational platform developed by the National Science and Technology Forum (NSTF) in South Africa. Launched in July 2020, it provides digital resources to support Science, Technology, Engineering, and Mathematics (STEM) education for students. The platform provides content aligned with the South African school curriculum for STEM subjects.

== History ==
The STEMulator was established under the NSTF’s proSET program, a network focused on advancing STEM education and professional development. It was launched in July 2020, providing interactive digital tools related to STEM subjects.

The platform was launched during a period of South Africa’s STEM skills shortage, with sources noting that 80% of future jobs may require STEM expertise. In 2022, offline USB distributions were provided to 150 rural schools. A virtual school feature was introduced on 16 June 2024.

== Features ==
The STEMulator offers an interactive interface with content aligned to the South African school curriculum, covering topics such as engineering and technology. The platform’s virtual world includes interactive elements depicting the structures and functions of objects related to STEM concepts.

The platform includes a virtual world with animated content, such as representations of biological and mechanical systems. In June 2024, modules on science and biology were added, with plans to include mathematics. The platform includes career information and content from Science, Engineering, and Technology (SET) societies related to STEM fields. The platform is accessible online and through offline USB distributions.

== Development and partnerships ==
The platform was developed through the NSTF’s proSET initiative in collaboration with educators, engineers, and software developers, with support from South African technology companies and non-governmental organizations.

Partnerships with regional organizations have been formed to enhance accessibility, though specific partners are not publicly disclosed.

== Reception ==
South African publications, such as Engineering News and RACA Journal, have reported on the STEMulator’s application in STEM education. According to Engineering News, some educators have incorporated the STEMulator into classroom resources.

== Awards and recognition ==
In 2023, the STEMulator received the national CAETS Communication Prize from the South African Academy of Engineering for its work in presenting STEM concepts to young audiences.

Additionally, it received an Honourable Mention at the CAETS Communication Prize during the CAETS 2024 symposium in Helsinki, Finland, for a video titled "STEMulator," nominated by the South African Academy of Engineering. The award recognizes audiovisual communication in technological sciences or engineering.
