= Monique Zaahl =

South African geneticist (born 1975)

Monique Zaahl OMB
- Born: 4 November 1975 (age 50)
- Occupation: Managing director of Gene Diagnostics

Academic background
- Education: Stellenbosch University

Academic work
- Discipline: Human genetics
- Institutions: Stellenbosch University
- Main interests: Iron overload

Monique Glenda Zaahl OMB (born 4 November 1975) is a South African geneticist. She was formerly a professor of genetics at Stellenbosch University, where she conducted influential research into iron overload. She is now the managing director of Gene Diagnostics, a private genetic testing company.

== Education ==
Zaahl completed her undergraduate degree at Stellenbosch University, where she became interested in human genetics as a result of the influence of Professor Louise Warnich. She obtained her PhD at Stellenboch in 2003; she received the 2001 Commonwealth Split-Site Scholarship to complete part of her doctoral research at Oxford University under the supervision of Kathryn Robson.

== Career ==
In 2004, she joined the Stellenbosch faculty as a lecturer. She was promoted to senior lecturer in 2006, associate professor in 2010, and head of the Department of Genetics in 2011; she was tenured as a full professor shortly afterwards. Her research at Stellenbosch focused on iron-related causes of disease, particularly via investigation of the genetic mechanisms of iron metabolism and iron overload.

In 2009, while still at Stellenbosch, she founded Gene Diagnostics, a private genetic testing company. The Star said it was the first such company owned by a black woman. She ultimately left academia to run the company full time. It received support from the Cyril Ramaphosa Foundation's Black Umbrellas business incubation programme, and in 2021 it moved its headquarters from Somerset West to Woodstock, Cape Town.

== Honours and awards ==
At the 2006 National Women in Science Awards, Zaahl was named the Best Emerging Young Scientist. In 2009, the National Science and Technology Forum awarded her the National Research Foundation-sponsored T. W. Kambule Award for young black researchers. In April 2010, President Jacob Zuma admitted her to the Order of Mapungubwe, granting her the award in Bronze "For her outstanding contribution to the field of genetics and research into disorders resulting from iron overload."
