= Peter Beighton =

South African geneticist (1934–2023)

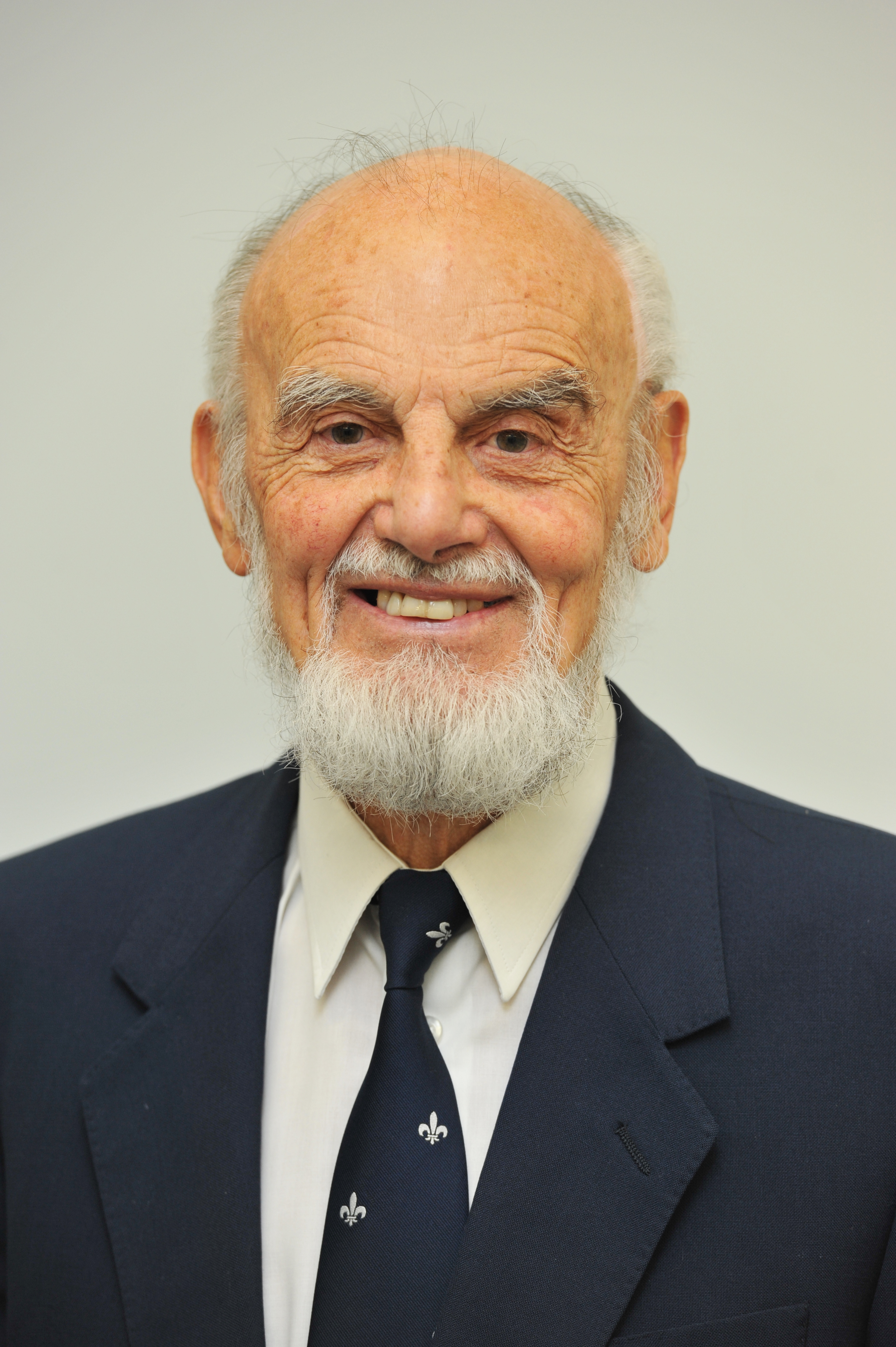
- Born: 28 June 1934; Bolton, Lancashire, England
- Died: 14 June 2023 (aged 88); Cape Town, South Africa
- Citizenship: South African
- Education: St Mary's Hospital, University of London; St Thomas' Hospital, London; Johns Hopkins Hospital, Baltimore
- Known for: Beighton Scale for joint hypermobility
- Spouse: Greta
- Awards: Gold medal of the British Orthopaedic Association, President's Medallion of the South African Orthopaedic Association, silver medal of the South African Medical Research Council, Order of Mapungubwe
- Scientific career
- Fields: Clinical genetics
- Workplaces: University of the Witwatersrand, University of Cape Town
- Academic advisors: Victor McKusick

Peter Herbert Beighton FRSSAf (28 June 1934 – 14 June 2023) was a British-born South African medical geneticist. He is known for inventing the Beighton Scale for joint hypermobility.

== Early life and education ==
Beighton was born in Bolton, Lancashire, England, on 28th June 1934. He qualified in medicine in 1957 at St Mary's Hospital, University of London. After several internships, Beighton served as a Medical Officer in the Parachute Regiment and with the United Nations forces during the Congo Crisis. In 1966 Beighton began training in internal medicine at St Thomas' Hospital in London and held a Fulbright research fellowship in clinical genetics in 1968-69 with Dr. Victor McKusick at Johns Hopkins Hospital in Baltimore.

== Career ==
Beighton undertook clinical research in the Sahara Desert and epidemiologic studies on Easter Island, Tristan da Cunha and in Southern Africa. In 1970, he moved to South Africa, joining the Division of Orthopaedic Surgery at the University of the Witwatersrand earning a PhD. In the course of this work, he developed the Beighton Scale. In 1972, Beighton was appointed Professor of Human Genetics at the University of Cape Town's Faculty of Medicine. His research was largely on inherited disorders of the skeleton and connective tissues.

Beighton received several awards including the gold medal of the British Orthopaedic Association, the President's Medallion of the South African Orthopaedic Association, the Smith & Nephew literary award and the silver medal of the South African Medical Research Council. In 2002, he was the first recipient of the newly established Order of Mapungubwe - bronze, which was bestowed for lifetime achievement as a scientist, and for research into the inherited disorders of the skeleton.

Beighton was a Fellow of the Royal Colleges of Physicians of London and Edinburgh. Beighton was accorded Fellowships of the University of Cape Town, the British Society of Rheumatology, the Royal Geographical Society and the Royal Society, SA. In 1999, at the age of 65 years he obtained the degree of Master of Philosophy in History by external thesis at the University of Lancaster, UK. Professor Beighton retired with Emeritus status at the end of 1999, retaining his links with UCT, and collaborating with the University of the Western Cape Faculty of Dentistry. In 2014 at the age of 80 years he was still employed part-time in the UCT Faculty of Health Sciences as a Senior Scholar.

Sixteen of Professor Beighton's postgraduate students have been awarded Doctorates, and ten of these have achieved Professorial status. Professor Beighton was the author, co-author or editor of 20 monographs and editions, 34 chapters and more than >430 medical publications.

Peter Beighton and his wife Greta Beighton shared an interest in the history of medical genetics and published two unique volumes of brief biographies of people for whom genetic syndromes have been named.

== Personal life and death ==
Peter and Greta participated in the sport of orienteering for many years, and they were South African champions in their respective age groups on several occasions. Greta died in Cape Town on 29 May 2017.

Peter Beighton died in Cape Town on 14 June 2023.
