= Malik Maaza =

African Nanosciences and Nanotechnology scientist (born 1963)

Professor Malik Maaza FRSC FAAS OMS
- Born: 1963 (age 62–63); Algeria
- Education: University of Oran; Pierre and Marie Curie University
- Awards: NSTF-GreenMatter Award; José Vasconcelos World Award of Education; ICO's Galileo Galilei award UNESCO's Spirit of Abdus Salam Award
- Scientific career
- Fields: Nanosciences and nanotechnology
- Workplaces: University of South Africa; University of the Witwatersrand
- Thesis: Etude theorique et experimentale de reflecteurs multicouches interferentielles pour neutrons : supermiroirs (1991)
- Website: UNISA

Malik Maaza (born 1963), also written as Mâaza, is an Algerian physicist and UNESCO Chair in Nanosciences and Nanotechnology. He has made significant contributions in the field of physics, particularly in nanosciences and nanotechnology. Maaza has received several prestigious awards for his contributions, including the Order of Mapungubwe, the Spirit of Abdus Salam Award, and recognition from the World Cultural Council regarding his work in education and research in physics.

== Biography ==
=== Early life and education ===
Malik Maaza was born in Algeria in 1963. He attained his bachelor's degree in solid-state physics from the University of Oran in 1987. He pursued a master's degree in photonics at Paris VI (today's Pierre and Marie Curie University) in 1988, followed by a PhD in neutron optics in 1991 at the same institute.

=== Career ===
After working across universities in Europe and Asia, Maaza joined University of the Witwatersrand in 1997 as a senior lecturer and later led the Advanced Nano-Materials and Nano-Scale Physics Lab. He co-found the African Laser Centre and South African Nanotechnology Initiative launched in 2001. He also spearheaded the Nanosciences African Network.

Maaza is a professor at the University of South Africa since 2013, and member of iThemba LABS since 2005. This laboratory has a scientific research centre known as the National Accelerator Centre, and specialises in the use of particle accelerators. He is the UNESCO Africa Chair in nanoscience and nanotechnology since 2013.

Maaza was an appointed member of the National Council for Scientific Research and Technology in 2021. He is also an editor for the Scientific African journal.

== Research ==
Maaza specialises in nanomaterials research, exploring their manipulation and properties at the nanoscale. His research spans photonics and nano-scale materials science, targeting diverse applications like selective solar absorbers, nanofluids for enhanced heat transfer in solar power, and renewable energy technologies.

His focus extends to advanced materials, including nanocomposites and biogenic-based materials, aiming to uncover their applications and characteristics. Investigating nanophotonics and photo-active nanomaterials, Maaza examines their optical properties for potential use in photonics and light-based technologies. Additionally, he pioneers smart coatings, seeking functionalities surpassing traditional coatings, involving stimuli-responsive or specialised properties. His extensive publications were cited 26,655 times as of November 2023, and his h-index is 95.

== Awards and honours ==
Maaza was nominated as a Fellow of several academics including the African Academy of Sciences in 2009 and the Royal Society of Chemistry. He received the African Union Kwame Nkrumah Award for Scientific Excellence in 2018, National Science and Technology Forum (NSTF)'s GreenMatter Award in 2018, on 8 November 2018, he received the José Vasconcelos World Award of Education by the World Cultural Council, International Commission for Optics's Galileo Galilei award in 2019, and he also received the UNESCO's Spirit of Abdus Salam Award in 2022.

In 2019, he received the Silver Order of Mapungubwe, a South African civilian honour awarded by the President of South Africa.
