= Makinde =

Mákindé
- Gender: Male
- Language: Yoruba

Origin
- Origin: Yorubaland
- Meaning: He brought valor.
- Region of origin: Yorubaland [Nigeria, Benin, Togo]

pronunciation

Mákindé is a Yoruba male given name and surname, which means "He brought valor.". Mákindé is distinctive, carrying a strong and meaningful undertone. Other full forms of the name include Adémákindé (The crown brings valor, or Royalty brought the brave one.), Fámákindé/Ifámákindé (Ifá has brought a warrior, or Ifa has brought valor.), Olúmákindé (God has brought a strong man (warrior) to this family.) Òbímákindé (Parents brought valor home) etc.

== Notable individuals with the name ==
- Oluwasegun Makinde (born 1991), Nigerian-born Canadian sprinter
- Seyi Makinde (born 1967), Nigerian politician, businessman, engineer, and philanthropist
- Tobi Makinde (born 1988), Nigerian actor and filmmaker
- Abiola Makinde (born 1973), Nigerian financial management expert and politician
- Daniel Makinde, Nigerian professor of Theoretical and Applied Physics
- Oluwasegun Makinde (born 1991), Nigeria-born Canadian athlete
- Moses Ajibade Makinde (born 1928), Accountant and Corporate Administrator
