= Tebello Nyokong =

South African chemist and professor

Tebello Nyokong OMB, FRS, HonFRSC, FRSSAf
- Born: 20 October 1951 (age 74); Maseru, Lesotho
- Education: National University of Lesotho (BSc); McMaster University (MSc); University of Western Ontario (PhD)
- Awards: Order of Mapungubwe in Bronze; South African Chemical Institute Gold Medal; L'Oreal-UNESCO Award for Women in Science
- Scientific career
- Fields: Chemistry
- Workplaces: Rhodes University
- Website: Distinguished Professor Tebello Nyokong

Tebello Nyokong OMB, FRS, HonFRSC, FRSSAf (born 20 October 1951) is a South African chemist and distinguished professor at Rhodes University.

She is currently researching photo-dynamic therapy, an alternative cancer treatment method to chemotherapy. In 2007, she was one of the top three publishing scientists in South Africa.

== Early life and education ==
"You believe you can be a wife and a mother and still be a bread winner and contribute to society. And you will" – Tebello Nyokong

Tebello Nyokong was born in Maseru, Lesotho on 20 October 1951 but spent most of her youth in South Africa.

Nyokong came from a poor background facing challenging circumstances. After being sent to live with her grandparents in the mountains of Lesotho she partitioned her childhood caring for sheep and going to school. Nyokong says that she would spend one day at school and then one day with the sheep as someone had to care for them. She published an open letter that she wrote nominally aimed at her 18-year-old self. It reflected that despite the hardships she would face her hard work would allow her to excel in mathematics and science, proving that material poverty does not equate to intellectual poverty. She reminded her self to trust her independent mind and not be swayed by peers or societal expectations and that her determination and love for science would guide her to not only a fulfilling career but also a family and that she would contribute to society.

Two years before her matric year she changed from art studies to the sciences, developing an interest in chemistry. She received her Cambridge Overseas School Certificate in 1972. Nyokong obtained her bachelor's degree in both chemistry and biology from the National University of Lesotho in 1977 followed by a Master's degree in Chemistry in 1981 from McMaster University in Ontario, Canada. In 1987, she received her Ph.D. in chemistry from the University of Western Ontario. After earning her PhD, she received a Fulbright fellowship to continue her post-doctoral studies at the University of Notre Dame in the United States.

== Career ==
After finishing her Fulbright fellowship in the United States, Nyokong briefly returned to Lesotho to take a position at the University of Lesotho before taking a position as a lecturer at Rhodes University in 1992. The National Research Foundation gave her a high rating and helped Nyokong obtain a research laboratory at the university. Soon, she moved from lecturer to professor, and then distinguished professor. She is known for her research in nanotechnology, as well as her work on photo-dynamic therapy. Her pioneering research in the latter is paving the way for a safer cancer detection and treatment, without the debilitating side effects of chemotherapy.

Nyokong’s research group is involved in the development of multifunctional nanodrugs for diagnostics and therapy by chemically linking metallic, magnetic, or semiconductor nanoparticles to photoactive phthalocyanine photosensitizers. These nanoparticles are designed to accumulate at target sites due to the enhanced permeability and retention (EPR) effect. Nanoparticles can be modified with various functional groups to act as photosensitizers or carriers, creating an all-in-one therapeutic tool. This tool can absorb a broad spectrum of light and convert it to phototoxic species within tumor cells, leading to targeted destruction requiring low light intensity and drug doses. Nyokong noted an exciting scientific challenge facing her field was developing better hybrid materials that act as photocatalysts, which could offer therapeutic value and resistance to microorganisms while also not acting as pollutants.

In 2014 she was a professor at Rhodes University in Grahamstown. She was the subject for a photographic portrait for Adrian Steirn's 21 icons which imagined her returned to her childhood role as a shepherd but now the shepherd is an adult and she is wearing her chemist's white coat. Copies of the picture were sold for charity.

In 2021, Nyokong co-wrote an article in Nature Materials highlighting obstacles facing researchers in Africa. She and her colleagues wrote that while the government funded university salaries and basic maintenance, international partners were needed to bring more resources to fund research itself. They also noted that collaborative efforts foster a more integrated scientific community and that more effort is needed to bridge the gap between academic research and marketable products, known as the innovation chasm.

== Awards and recognition ==
Nyokong is a recipient of South Africa's Order of Mapungubwe, South Africa's highest honour. She received the L'Oréal-UNESCO For Women in Science Award representing Africa and the Arab States in 2009, the South African Chemical Institute Gold Medal in 2012, and was named one of the Top 10 Most Influential Women in Science and Technology in Africa by IT News Africa. In 2013 she was awarded the National Research Foundation's Lifetime Achievement Award. In 2016 she received the African Union Kwame Nkrumah Award for Scientific Excellence at the Continental level in the Basic Science, Technology and Innovation category and in 2017 the Black Science, Technology & Engineering Professionals (BSTEP) Excellence Award.
