= Overtoun Jenda =

African mathematician

- Born: Malawi
- Awards: Presidential Award for Excellence in Science, Mathematics, and Engineering Mentoring

Academic background
- Education: BSc, mathematics, University of Malawi; MSc, PhD, 1981, University of Kentucky
- Thesis: On Injective Resolvents (1981)

Academic work
- Institutions: Auburn University; University of Kentucky

Overtoun Malandula G. Jenda is a Malawi-born American mathematician. He is a Professor of Mathematics and Assistant Provost for Special Projects and Initiatives at Auburn University. Jenda received a Presidential Award for Excellence in Science, Mathematics, and Engineering Mentoring in 2020 and was elected a Fellow of the American Association for the Advancement of Science in 2024.

== Early life and education ==
Jenda was born and raised in Malawi. He earned his Bachelor of Science degree in mathematics from the University of Malawi before moving to the United States. He then completed a Master of Science and PhD in mathematics from the University of Kentucky. His PhD was completed under the advisement of Edgar Earle Enochs.

== Career ==
After completing his PhD, Jenda taught at the University of Kentucky until 1988, when he accepted a professorship at Auburn University (AU). As he was the only Black faculty member in the department, he was often sought out by Black students for assistance and guidance. In 1994, Jenda established the Louis Stokes Alliance for Minority Participation (LSAMP) program at AU and started a summer internship program for minority students. As the director of LSAMP, Jenda opened and operated a drop-in tutoring center and developed an outreach program aimed at recruiting high-school students interested in engineering. He also established the Summer Bridge Program to help minority students get acclimated to the changes from high school to university. Outside of his work with LSAMP, Jenda was appointed a Full professor in 1997 and became the associate dean of the College of Sciences and Mathematics in 2000. Jenda ran the Summer Bridge Program until 2006 when he was appointed AU's associate provost for diversity and multicultural affairs.

As an associate provost, Jenda established the Provost Leadership Undergraduate Scholarship (PLUS) Program to support underrepresented students. By 2009, PLUS had provided scholarships to 125 students, including 55 first-generation college students. As such, PLUS received the 2009 Scholarship Provider of the Year Award from the National Scholarship Providers Association. In 2011, Jenda co-founded the Southern Africa Mathematical Sciences Association Masamu project to increase the presence of American mathematical research in Africa.

Jenda received a Presidential Award for Excellence in Science, Mathematics, and Engineering Mentoring in 2020 and was elected a Fellow of the American Association for the Advancement of Science in 2024.
