= Roseanne Diab =

South African researcher (1949–2026)

- Born: Roseanne Denise Diab; 11 November 1949; Durban North, South Africa
- Died: 10 January 2026 (aged 76); Kloof, South Africa
- Scientific career
- Fields: Atmospheric sciences
- Institutions: University of KwaZulu-Natal

Roseanne Denise Diab (11 November 1949 – 10 January 2026) was a South African researcher, who was the Director of Gender in science, innovation, technology and engineering (SITE), a UNESCO's programme unit hosted by The World Academy of Sciences (TWAS) and former CEO of the Academy of Science of South Africa. She was a Fellow of the University of KwaZulu-Natal and Emeritus Professor in the School of Environmental Sciences at the same university.

== Life and career ==
Diab published over 86 peer-reviewed scholarly articles. She is recognised for her contribution in the field of atmospheric sciences, particularly climate change, air quality, dispersion modeling and tropospheric ozone variability. She was also a Fellow of the Society of South African Geographers and was a member of various international bodies such as the Commission on Atmospheric Chemistry and Global Pollution (CACGP) and the International Ozone Commission (IOC).

Diab died in Kloof, South Africa on 10 January 2026, at the age of 76.
