= Catherine Sole =

South African entomologist and molecular ecologist

Catherine Lynne Sole
- Born: January 1978 (age 48)
- Education: BSc (University of Pretoria) BSc (honours) Entomology (University of Pretoria) PhD Entomology (University of Pretoria)
- Scientific career
- Workplaces: University of Pretoria

Catherine Lynne Sole is a South African entomologist. She leads the Invertebrate Biosystematics and Conservation Group (IBCG) in the department of zoology and entomology at the University of Pretoria.

Sole completed her PhD in entomology in 2005, followed by post docs in Prof Scholtz's group and she was appointed in 2013 as a senior lecturer in the department, promoted to associate professor in 2016 and to full professor in 2023. Sole has contributed significantly to the understanding of scarabaeoid (dung beetle) and nemopterid (lacewing) systematics at both a local and international level. Sole is one of the African coordinators of the CGSG – Conservation Genetics specialist group, which provides advice on genetic policy and management for the IUCN. Sole is as well associated with the Forestry and Agricultural Biotechnology Institute (FABI). In recognition of her contributions to science and society Sole was inaugurated into the Academy of Science of South Africa in 2024.

== Research interests ==
Her general research interest and approach is driven by the power of molecular techniques in testing evolutionary processes at various levels: population, species, and higher taxa; finding common evolutionary patterns in different taxa that reflect landscape and phylogenetic changes; and linking them to climatic, biogeographic and geological changes. Sole has presented at national and international conferences, one of which was an invited presentation for International Congress of Entomology, ICE2012 in South Korea. Sole is also the Chair of ICE 2008, a spin-off of the ICE 2008 in South Africa, promoting entomology in Africa.

Sole serves on the editorial board for Scientific Reports and Frontiers in Insect Science.

Sole has over 100 publications, received a rating form the NRF and has contributed two book chapters in 'Honeybees of Asia' and a single chapter in the book, "Bat evolution, ecology and conservation"; published by Springer.

The beetle Macroderes soleiana (Coleoptera: Scarabaeidae: Scarabaeinae) is named after Sole "in recognition of her leadership and her molecular work on the African dung beetles, lacewings and Baboon spiders".
