= Claire Penn =

South African speech and language pathologist

- Born: 1951; Kenya
- Died: 21 July 2018 (aged 66–67)
- Education: University of the Witwatersrand
- Scientific career
- Fields: Speech-language pathology
- Workplaces: University of the Witwatersrand

Claire Penn (1951–2018) was a South African speech and language pathologist, and held the endowed chair of Speech Pathology and Audiology at the University of the Witwatersrand, and was a former senior research specialist at the Human Sciences Research Council. She received the Order of Mapungubwe (Silver) in 2007, South Africa's highest honor, for her work in linguistics, sign language, child language, aphasia, and head injury.

== Career ==
Penn was born in Kenya and moved with her family to South Africa at age 12. She attended the University of the Witwatersrand (Wits), where she completed her bachelor's degree (cum laude) in Speech and Hearing in 1972. She worked at Wits as clinical tutor from 1973 to 1976 before moving to England as a British council scholar. She returned to Wits to earn a PhD in 1983.

She was a visiting scholar to Macquarie University in Sydney, Australia, and Case Western Reserve University in the United States. In 2008 Penn was named Shoprite Checkers / SABC 2 South Africa Woman of the Year for Science and Technology. In 2012, her visit and lecture on "Health Communication across Cultures: Some Perspectives from South Africa" was funded by Duke University.

== Personal life ==
She had two children, and her hobbies included mountain climbing and hiking.

== Awards and honours ==
She was awarded the Order of Mapungubwe in Silver in 2007 for "Excellent contribution to the field of speech and language pathology, especially in the area of linguistics, sign language, child language, aphasia and head injury and producing ground-breaking research in understanding the complexities of human communication."
