= South African Mathematical Society =

- Formation: 1957; 69 years ago
- Members: 300+
- President: Zurab Janelidze
- Key people: Immediate Past President: Precious Sibanda, Vice-president: Sethuti Moshokoa, General Secretary: Karin-Therese Howell
- Website: www.sams.ac.za

The South African Mathematical Society (SAMS) is a professional mathematical society of South Africa. The Society was established in 1957. The SAMS publishes a research journal Quaestiones Mathematicae, as well the Notices of the South African Mathematical Society (which serves as a general communications bulletin of the society), and holds its Annual Congress. The Society also helps represent South African mathematics and mathematicians in various national and international structures, including the International Mathematical Union, African Mathematical Union, Southern Africa Mathematical Sciences Association, Association for Mathematics Education of South Africa, and others.

The SAMS has more than 300 members.

== History ==
The South African Mathematical Society was established in 1957, originally under the English name 'The South African Mathematical Association' and the corresponding Afrikaans name ‘Die Suid-Afrikaanse Wiskundige Vereniging’. Dr Johann van der Mark from the Mathematics Division, National Physics Research Laboratory, Institute of Physics of the Council for Scientific and Industrial Research (CSIR) in Pretoria, was a key figure in setting up and launching the South African Mathematical Association. The first Chairman of the Council of the Association, for the period 1957–1958, was James M. Hyslop (University of the Witwatersrand).

The SAMS was one of the groups involved in launching, in 1992–1993 the new Association for Mathematics Education of South Africa (AMESA), a professional association for mathematics education in South Africa.

=== SAMS and apartheid ===
From the moment the SAMS was launched in 1957, its Constitution, membership, election and office-holder rules were non-discriminatory and did not contain any racially restrictive language. In August 1962 the SAMS Council decided that, notwithstanding the apartheid laws and social expectations in the country, the SAMS would not form separate branches of the SAMS for non-white members. Nevertheless, until the early 1990s, the SAMS had only a few non-white members; thus the Society had two black members in 1977 and four in 1980.

During the apartheid era, the SAMS continued to experience difficulties it terms of its international recognition and international activities because of the general international human rights, protest and boycott movements directed against the South African regime. Thus the American Mathematical Society originally established a reciprocity agreement with the SAMS in 1972, after an investigation by the AMS showed that the membership rules for admittance to the SAMS were non-discriminatory. However, after protests by civil rights activists, the AMS cancelled the reciprocity agreement in 1974. The AMS restored its reciprocity agreement with the SAMS in 1994, after the fall of the apartheid. The SAMS annual Distinguished Visitor program experienced a high rate of declined invitations and postponed visits due to concerns of the international mathematical community about the apartheid. One of the most publicized visits under the program was that of Peter Hilton, who was the SAMS Distinguished Visitor for 1981. Hilton published a letter in the Notices of the American Mathematical Society, prior to his visit, explaining the conditions on which he accepted the visit and later published an account of his visit.

== Membership ==
Generally, membership in SAMS requires holding a bachelor's degree, or its equivalent, in a mathematical discipline. Admission to membership requires nomination by two current members of the Society and must be approved by the SAMS Council.

At present there are four membership categories:

- Full members
- Special members, eligible for reduced membership fees (often applicable to graduate students and retirees, and to members of foreign mathematical societies with which the SAMS has reciprocity agreements)
- Institutional members (applies to certain institutions that are regarded as a single member of the SAMS)
- Honorary members

== Awards ==
The SAMS grants two awards:

- The SAMS Award for Research Distinction, awarded for outstanding research achievements, to "recognise and reward substantial research carried out in South Africa, which does credit to South African Mathematics".
- The SAMS Award for the Advancement of Mathematics, "to recognise and reward exceptional and distinguished service to the cultivation of Mathematics in South Africa".

The SAMS also has one student award:

- The SAMS Bronze Medal is awarded to the best honors students in Mathematics or Applied Mathematics at South African universities.
