= Forestry and Agricultural Biotechnology Institute =

South African research institute

- Abbreviation: FABI
- Formation: 1997; 29 years ago
- Founder: Mike Wingfield
- Type: Research Institute
- Location: Pretoria, South Africa
- Director: Bernard Slippers
- Affiliations: University of Pretoria
- Website: www.fabinet.up.ac.za

The Forestry and Agricultural Biotechnology Institute (FABI) (Pretoria) was established in 1997 and is located on the University of Pretoria campus. The initial goal of the institute was to help the development of novel food and fibre crops, that will clearly contribute to global economic development and food security. Over the last decades the goals have expanded to cover a wide range of research fields.

FABI was involved in 2011 in the completion of the eucalyptus tree genome (Eucalyptus grandis).

== Primary Objectives ==
Promoting broad field research through a multidisciplinary and interdisciplinary approach and with a close link to a wide range of departments.

Members are based in a number of academic departments, like Profs Brenda Wingfield, Sanushka Naidoo, Mike Wingfield, Bernard Slippers, Fanus Venter in Biochemistry, Genetics and Microbiology, or Profs Catherine Sole, Almuth Hammerbacher, Brett Hurley, Abdullahi Yusuf, Christopher Weldon, Christian Pirk in Zoology and Entomology.

Conducting research to provide short- and long-term benefits to the forestry and agricultural sectors of South Africa and beyond.

Establishing partnerships with industries not limited to forestry and agriculture, both nationally and internationally.

== Research Groups, Satellite Labs and International Programmes ==
- African Plant Systems Biology for the Bioeconomy (APSB)
- Applied Mycology
- Bacterial Genomics and Host Pathogen Interactions
- Biophysics
- Citrus Preharvest Disease Research Programme
- Crop Floral Biology and Environments (CFBE)
- DSI-NRF Centre of Excellence in Plant Health Biotechnology (CPHB)
- DSI-NRF SARChi Chair, Fungal Genomics
- Endophyte Ecology
- Eucalyptus and Pine Pathogen Interactions (EPPI)
- Forest Molecular Genetics (FMG) Programme
- Grain Research Programme (GRP)
- Hans Merensky Chair in Avocado Research
- Kiwifruit Protection Programme (KPP)
- Macadamia Protection Programme (MaPP)
- Molecular Plant-Pathogen Interactions (MPPI)
- Molecular Plant Physiology
- Phytobacteriology
- Plant Virology
- Potato Pathology Programme @UP
- Social Insects Research Group (SIRG)
- Systematics and Evolution of Symbiotic Nitrogen-Fixing Bacteria
- Tree Protection Cooperative Programme (TPCP)
- Satellite Lab in Applied Chemical Ecology
- Satellite Lab in Remote Sensing of Plant Health
- RIFT-FABI Tree Protection Programme (RFTPP)
- RGE-FABI Tree Health Programme
