= Johann Lutjeharms =

South African marine scientist

- Born: Johann Reinder Erlers Lutjeharms; April 13, 1944; South Africa
- Died: June 8, 2011 (aged 67); Stellenbosch
- Occupation: Marine scientist
- Known for: Authority in the oceanography of the Agulhas Current

Johann Reinder Erlers Lutjeharms (13 April 1944 - 8 June 2011), was a leading South African marine scientist and an authority in the oceanography of the Agulhas Current, who authored a definitive work on the subject, The Agulhas Current (Springer 2006). His main field of investigation was the large-scale circulation patterns of the oceans adjacent to southern Africa and their influence on weather and climate, and he participated in 17 research cruises and was responsible for a further 48 projects undertaken on such cruises.

== Scientific career ==
Lutjeharms joined the National Research Institute for Oceanology of the South African Council for Scientific and Industrial Research (CSIR), where he held the position of chief specialist researcher. He became the Chair of Ocean Climatology at the University of Cape Town in 1990 and, in 1993, became the founding director of UCT's Centre for Marine Studies. He was made Professor Extraordinarius at the University of South Africa in 2009.

=== Natal pulse ===
He coined the term ‘Natal pulse’ in 1988 to describe a large offshore meander in the Agulhas Current originating near Durban. This meander travels slowly down the east coast of South Africa towards Port Elizabeth, then leaves the coast in a U-turn known as the retroflection. Becoming the Agulhas Return Current, it then turns east, before looping back towards Madagascar.

=== Delagoa Bight eddy ===
Lutjeharms also described and named the cyclonic Delagoa Bight eddy.

=== Awards and fellowships ===
Lutjeharms was a recipient of South Africa's highest honour, the Order of Mapungubwe (Silver)(2010), for his contribution to and achievements in oceanographic science. The University of Cape Town has three main forms of recognition for its academic staff; Lutjeharms received all three, and he held honorary degrees from the universities of Johannesburg, Pretoria and Rhodes.

- Academy of Science of South Africa SAJS Centenary Award
- German Humboldt Research Award (1993)
- European Geophysical Union Fridtjof Nansen Medal
- National Science and Technology Forum Individual Over a Lifetime (2008)
- Royal Society of South Africa John FW Herschel Medal
- South African Society for Atmospheric Sciences Stanley Jackson Award
- University of Cape Town DSc degree (1992) (the university's most prestigious degree)
- University of Cape Town Faculty of Science Research Award
- University of Otago New Zealand Williams Evan Visiting Fellowship
- National Science and Technology Forum (NSTF) Category A award winner (2007/2008)
- South African Network for Coastal and Oceanic Research (Sancor) John D Gilchrist medal

=== Offices and memberships ===
- Academy of Science of South Africa member
- Council of the South African Society for Atmospheric Sciences member and honorary member
- Die Afrikaner Genootskap, Stellenbosch, member
- International Association for the Physical Sciences of the Oceans, working group member
- International Union of Conservation of Nature and Natural Resources working group member
- Royal Society of South Africa, Fellow, council member and vice-president
- Scientific Committee for Oceanic Research (SCOR), working group member
- South African National Committee for Oceanographic Research, member
- South African Society of Atmospheric Sciences, honorary member, council member
- Suid-Afrikaanse Akademie vir Wetenskap en Kuns, member, Faculty Council for Science

=== Afrikaans ===
Lutjeharms extended his academic endeavours to the Afrikaans language by compiling a dictionary of oceanographic terms, and contributing to the leading dictionary of the language.

== Biography ==
=== Early life and education ===
Lutjeharms was born in Bloemfontein on 13 April 1944, and attended Grey College. He completed his undergraduate studies in physics and, in 1971, received his MSc (cum laude) in oceanography at the University of Cape Town and was awarded the Harry Crossley Bursary, the Fisheries Development Corporation postgraduate overseas bursary and the CSIR overseas bursary to study for a PhD at the University of Washington, where he graduated in 1977.

=== Marriage and children ===
Lutjeharms was married to Ronel and they have two children, Wilhelm and Maria.

=== Death ===
Lutjeharms died at his home in Stellenbosch, aged 67, on World Oceans Day, 8 June 2011, after a 10-year battle with cancer.
