= Barry Schoub =

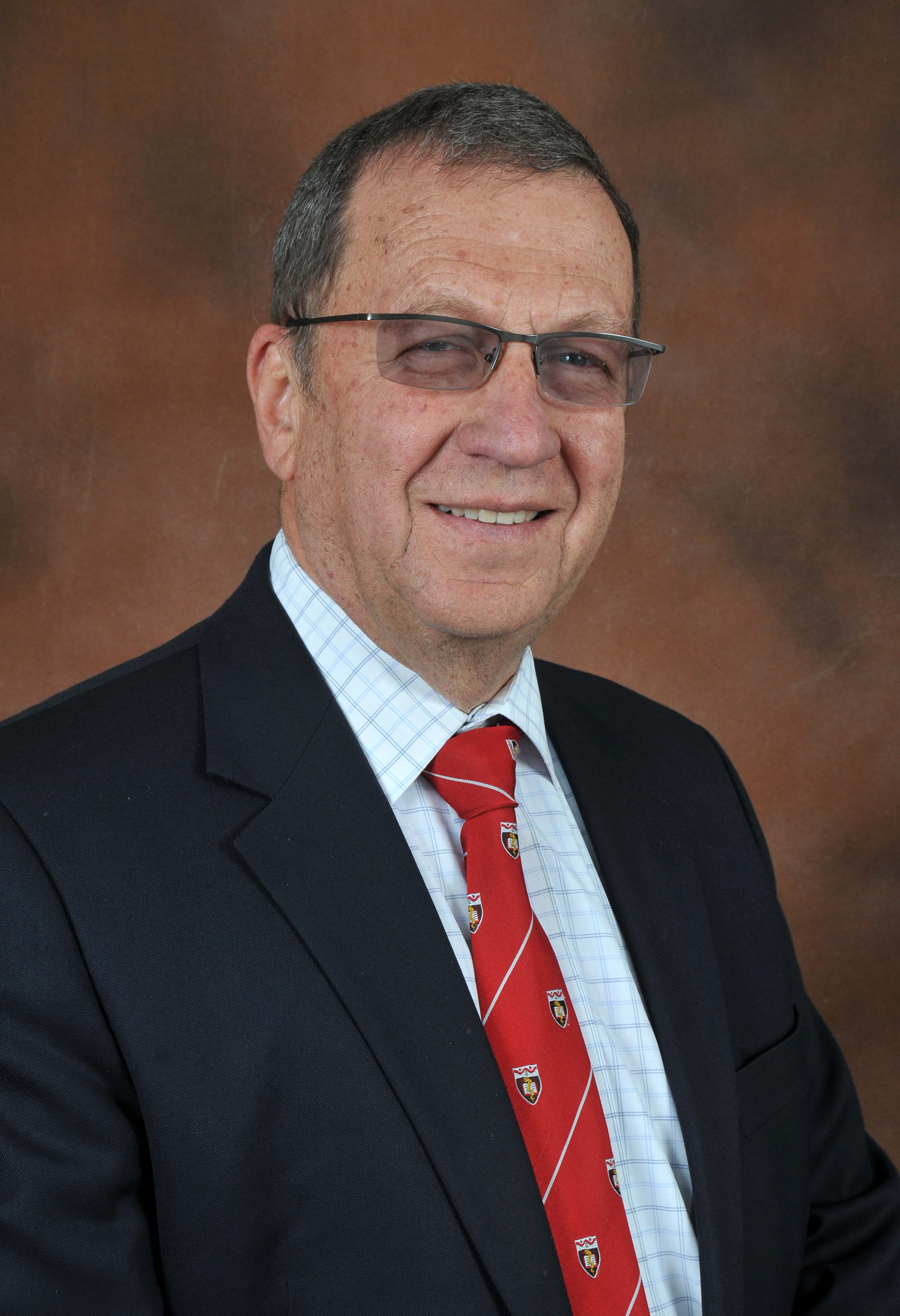
- Born: Barry
- Citizenship: South Africa
- Occupation: virologist
- Employer: University of the Witwatersrand

Barry Schoub is a South African medical virologist known for his work in medical virology research. At the age of 33 he became the first Professor and Head of the Department of Virology at University of the Witwatersrand. He was the founding Director of the National Institute for Communicable Diseases (NICD) of South Africa, serving as executive director between 2002 and 2011. He chairs South Africa's Ministerial Advisory Committee on COVID-19 vaccines (VMAC). He was also the founding president of the African Virology Association, chaired the Scientific Advisory Panel of the Poliomyelitis Research Foundation and served on the Scientific Advisory Committee of the South African AIDS Vaccine Initiative. Commenting on the importance of lessons learnt from the COVID-19 vaccines, Schoub said that there is a need “for early recognition and immediate epidemic control of emerging infectious diseases.” He continued, saying that “International health cooperation and its facilitation, which has to be free of political interference, is a priority and an imperative. Provisions must be made for a global infrastructure for rapid vaccine manufacture and distribution to all parts of the world. Now may well be the time to plan for a future in which vaccines are not treated as commercial commodities but as essential prevention instruments to benefit the health of everyone on the planet.” He was awarded the Order of Mapungubwe by the State President in 2012.
