= Siyabulela Xuza =

South African scientist

Siyabulela Lethuxolo Xuza
- Born: 1989 (age 36–37); Mthatha, Eastern Cape
- Education: St. John's College
- Alma mater: Harvard University (BSc Engineering Science)
- Awards: Order of Mapungubwe

Siyabulela Lethuxolo Xuza (born 1989) is a South African scientist, energy-engineering expert and entrepreneur. He is the founder and managing director of Galactic Energy Ventures, an investment company focused on the energy needs of emerging markets. He is the youngest member of the Africa 2.0 Energy Advisory Panel.

In 2017 President Jacob Zuma presented Xuza with South Africa's highest honour, the Order of Mapungubwe for his contributions to scientific innovation.

== Early life and career ==
Xuza was born in Mthatha, Eastern Cape in 1989 and attended St. John's College in Johannesburg. Describing the moment that sparked high passion for science he said:

I was chasing the roar of a Cessna plane dropping election pamphlets over Mthatha, my South African township. It was 1994, the first year of a new democracy in my country, and the sight of that technological marvel ignited in me a curiosity for science and a passion for using technology to engineer an African renaissance.

Ten years later, at age 16, Xuza began experimenting with rocket fuel he made in his mother's kitchen. After six months and 77 failed launches his experiments culminated in him launching a homemade rocket, The Phoenix, which achieved an altitude of over 1 kilometer, thereby earning him the junior South African amateur high-powered altitude record.

Xuza's project on solid rocket fuel won gold at the Eskom Expo for Young Scientists in 2006, along with the Dr Derek Gray Memorial award for the most prestigious project in the country. He was invited to present his project at the international Youth Science Fair in Sweden in December 2006.

In 2007 Xuza's project, “African Space: Fueling Africa’s quest to space”, was entered into the International Science and Engineering Fair where it won the “Best of Category” award and a "First Award” in the energy and transportation sector. He was presented with the Dudley R. Herschbach Award, an all expense trip paid trip to the Stockholm International Youth Science Seminar, and attendance to the Nobel Prize ceremonies. The New Mexico Oil and Gas Company awarded him US$8 000 and a high performance laptop from Intel. Xuza was also awarded a scholarship to the Harvard School of Engineering and Applied Sciences. There he conducted research into making cheaper solar cells and the viability of solar technologies.

In 2010 Xuza was elected a fellow of the African Leadership Network, which aims to create prosperity in Africa. In the same year, he spoke at the African Union in Addis Ababa on this topic.

Xuza became a fellow of the Kairos Society in 2011. The organisation is focused on establishing companies who aim to promote affordable everyday services. He also served as the youngest member of the African Union – affiliated Africa 2.0 Energy Advisory Panel. He was invited to Mombasa, Kenya, to assist in finding sustainable solutions to economic and social issues facing Africa.

In 2014, Xuza co-published work on micro fuel cells in the Journal of Electroceramics. Xuza was interviewed about this research by Phakamisa Ndzamela, financial services editor at Business Day, in which they discussed how the technology could be used in a power source to charge small devices such as cellphones and laptop computers.

Xuza became Total South Africa's energy ambassador in 2015 and he was a guest speaker at the African Leadership Academy in Johannesburg in 2015. In May 2017 he was interviewed on the Expresso Show on SABC 3 regarding his "Upliftment Initiative".

== Recognition ==
In 2017 Xuza was presented with the Order of Mapungubwe in Silver by President Jacob Zuma. The description of the award reads: "For his excellent contribution to scientific innovation at an early stage, proving to himself and others that through determination and hard work one can achieve new career heights. His brilliance has attracted great international minds to his work."

Xuza featured in 21 Icons a film series that traces SA’s history and vision for the future.

In 2013, as part of her presentation at the SciBono Discovery Centre in Johannesburg, Michelle Obama spoke about Xuza's early life.

Asteroid 23182 Siyaxuza, discovered by astronomers with the Lincoln Near-Earth Asteroid Research on 23 July 2000 was named 23182 Siyaxuza after him. The official naming citation was published by the Minor Planet Center on 28 August 2007 (M.P.C. 60502). It is an X-type asteroid from the main-belt's background population. It measures approximately 2.5 kilometers in diameter. This honour was bestowed on Xuza in recognition of his innovation in rocket fuels.
