= Order of Mapungubwe =

South African National award

Awarded by President of South Africa
- Type: Civilian national order
- Established: 6 December 2002
- Status: Currently constituted
- Grades: Platinum (OMP); Gold (OMG); Silver (OMS); Bronze (OMB)
- Ribbon

The Order of Mapungubwe is a South African civilian honour awarded by the President of South Africa. It recognises South African citizens whose achievements have international impact and serve the interests of South Africa. It is South Africa's highest honour.

The order is named after the ancient civilisation of Mapungubwe, which was located in modern-day South Africa. It was instituted on 6 December 2002, and its first recipient (in the highest class) was former president Nelson Mandela.

== Classes ==
The order originally had three classes, and was enlarged to four in 2004:

- Platinum (OMP), for exceptional and unique achievements;
- Gold (OMG), for exceptional achievements;
- Silver (OMS), for excellent achievements; and
- Bronze (OMB), for outstanding achievements.

== Design ==
The badge is a horizontal oval above an inverted trapezium. Inside the oval frame is depicted a golden rhinoceros with the sun rising above Mapungubwe Hill in the background. The convex upper edge of the trapezium is decorated with a beadwork pattern and the sides are edged with sceptres. In the centre is an ornate crucible from which molten gold flows down to a red furnace. The South African coat of arms is displayed on the reverse.

The ribbon is gold, edged with a line of cream-coloured bead-like dots along each edge, and recurring cream-coloured rhinoceros silhouettes down the centre. All four classes are worn around the neck.

== Recipients ==
| Recipient | Class | Year | Field of achievement | Ref. |
|---|---|---|---|---|
| Nelson Mandela | Platinum | 2002 | Liberation struggle, national reconciliation and nation-building, and global peace and justice | |
| F. W. de Klerk | Gold | 2002 | Peace, national reconciliation and nation-building | |
| Allan McLeod Cormack † | Gold | 2002 | Science and CT scanning | |
| Basil Schonland † | Gold | 2002 | Physics and foundation of the Council for Scientific and Industrial Research | |
| Peter Beighton | Bronze | 2002 | Science and research into inherited skeleton disorders | |
| Hamilton Naki | Bronze | 2002 | Medical science | |
| Sydney Brenner | Gold | 2004 | Medicine, especially research in genetics | |
| Tshilidzi Marwala | Bronze | 2004 | Engineering science | |
| Daya Reddy | Bronze | 2004 | Mathematics and science | |
| J. M. Coetzee | Gold | 2005 | Literature | |
| Aaron Klug | Gold | 2005 | Medicine | |
| Frank Nabarro | Gold | 2005 | Science | |
| Tebello Nyokong | Bronze | 2005 | Science | |
| Himladevi Soodyall | Bronze | 2005 | Science | |
| Selig Percy Amoils | Silver | 2006 | Ophthalmology | |
| George Ellis | Silver | 2006 | Science | |
| Lionel Opie | Silver | 2006 | Cardiology | |
| Patricia Berjak | Silver | 2006 | Seed science | |
| Claire Penn | Silver | 2007 | Speech and language pathology, especially research into sign language, child language, aphasia and head injuries | |
| Sibusiso Sibisi | Silver | 2007 | Information technology, research and development and business technology | |
| Valerie Mizrahi | Silver | 2007 | Biochemistry and molecular biology, including tuberculosis drug validation | |
| Doris Lessing | Gold | 2008 | Literature and the elimination of colonialism and apartheid | |
| Wieland Gevers | Silver | 2008 | Higher education and medicine | |
| Phuti Ngoepe | Silver | 2008 | Natural sciences and computer modelling research | |
| Tim Noakes | Silver | 2008 | Sport and the science of physical exercise | |
| Pragasen Pillay | Silver | 2008 | Energy conservation | |
| Mangena Maake Mokone † | Gold | 2009 | African Ethiopian Movement | |
| Hendrik J. Koornhof | Silver | 2009 | Biomedical science | |
| Bongani Mayosi | Silver | 2009 | Medical science | |
| Johann Lutjeharms | Silver | 2009/10 | Oceanographic science | |
| Douglas Butterworth | Silver | 2010 | Betterment of the environment and sustainability of fisheries | |
| Monique Zaahl | Bronze | 2010 | Genetics and research into iron overload disorders | |
| Pieter Steyn | Silver | 2011 | Chemistry and biosynthesis of mycotoxins | |
| Oliver Tambo † | Platinum | 2012 | Exceptional leadership during the anti-apartheid struggle | |
| Albert Luthuli † | Platinum | 2012 | Exceptional leadership during the anti-apartheid struggle | |
| Barry Schoub | Silver | 2012 | Virology | |
| Patience Mthunzi-Kufa | Bronze | 2012 | Biophotonics | |
| Bernie Fanaroff | Silver | 2013 | Astronomy and the Square Kilometre Array | |
| George Ekama | Silver | 2013 | Research into wastewater treatment | |
| Glenda Gray | Silver | 2013 | Research into mother-to-child transmission of HIV/AIDS | |
| Malegapuru William Makgoba | Silver | 2013 | Transformation of higher education | |
| Quarraisha Abdool Karim | Bronze | 2013 | Research into HIV/AIDS and tuberculosis | |
| Ismail Mohamed † | Silver | 2014 | Mathematics and political liberation | |
| Hendrik Simon Schaaf | Silver | 2014 | Medical science | |
| William Soga † | Silver | 2014 | Medicine and anthropology | |
| Namrita Lall | Bronze | 2014 | Medical science | |
| Zwelakhe Sisulu † | Gold | 2016 | Journalism | |
| Fulufhelo Nelwamondo | Silver | 2017 | Science, especially electrical engineering | |
| Siyabulela Xuza | Silver | 2017 | Scientific innovation | |
| Edna Molewa † | Gold | 2019 | Environmental justice | |
| Malik Maaza | Silver | 2019 | Nano-science | |
| Ari Sitas | Silver | 2019 | Social science | |
| Thokozani Majozi | Bronze | 2019 | Science, especially a novel mathematical technique for near-zero-effluent batch chemical facilities which enables the reuse of wastewater | |
| Aboubaker Ebrahim Dangor | Silver | 2023 | Physics | |
| Vhahangwele Masindi | Silver | 2023 | Environmental sciences and water | |
| Mulalo Doyoyo | Silver | 2024 | applied mechanics, ultralight materials, green building, renewable energy, and other fields of engineering | |
| Salim Abdool Karim | Gold | 2026 | Medical research – tuberculosis and HIV/AIDS | |
| Tulio de Oliveira | Gold | 2026 | Medical research – Omicron variant of COVID-19 | |
| Keertan Dheda | Silver | 2026 | Medical research – Tuberculosis and other respiratory diseases | |
| Vukosi Marivate | Silver | 2026 | Computer science | |

== See also ==
- South African civil honours
- Golden Rhinoceros of Mapungubwe

== Other sources ==
- "National Orders Booklet 2002". The Presidency. 10 May 2019. Archived from the original on 10 May 2019.
- "National Orders Booklet 2003". The Presidency. 10 May 2019. Archived from the original on 10 May 2019.
- "National Orders Booklet 2004". The Presidency. 10 May 2019. Archived from the original on 10 May 2019.
- "National Orders Booklet 2005". The Presidency. 10 May 2019. Archived from the original on 10 May 2019.
- "National Orders Booklet 2006". The Presidency. 27 October 2017. Archived from the original on 27 October 2017.
- "National Orders Booklet 2007". The Presidency. 10 May 2019. Archived from the original on 10 May 2019.
- "National Orders Booklet 2008". The Presidency. 10 May 2019. Archived from the original on 10 May 2019.
- "National Orders Booklet 2009". The Presidency. 10 May 2019. Archived from the original on 10 May 2019.
- "National Orders Booklet 2010". The Presidency. 10 May 2019. Archived from the original on 10 May 2019.
- "National Orders Booklet 2011". The Presidency. 10 May 2019. Archived from the original on 10 May 2019.
- "National Orders Booklet 2012". The Presidency. 10 May 2019. Archived from the original on 10 May 2019.
- "National Orders Booklet 2013". The Presidency. 10 May 2019. Archived from the original on 10 May 2019.
- "National Orders Booklet 2014". The Presidency. 10 May 2019. Archived from the original on 10 May 2019.
- "National Orders Booklet 2015". The Presidency. 10 May 2019. Archived from the original on 10 May 2019.
- "National Orders Booklet 2016". The Presidency. 10 May 2019. Archived from the original on 10 May 2019.
- "National Orders Booklet 2017". The Presidency. 10 May 2019. Archived from the original on 10 May 2019.
- "National Orders Booklet 2018". The Presidency. 10 May 2019. Archived from the original on 10 May 2019.
- "National Orders Booklet 2019". The Presidency. 10 May 2019. Archived from the original on 10 May 2019.
