= Daniel Makinde =

Nigerian professor of physics

Oluwole Daniel Makinde is a Nigerian professor of Theoretical and Applied Physics, the Secretary General of African Mathematical Union (AMU), General Secretary and Vice President of Southern Africa Mathematical Science Association (SAMSA) and the Director of the Institute for Advanced Research in Mathematical Modeling and Computations (IARMMC) at Cape Peninsula University of Technology, South Africa.

== Education ==
In 1987, Daniel Makinde obtained his first degree from Obafemi Awolowo University, Ile Ife in the field of Mathematics. In 1990, He also obtained his MSc degree in Applied and Computational Mathematics from the same Alma mater and in 1996, he bagged his doctorate degree from the University of Bristol, United Kingdom.

== Membership and fellowship ==
He is an advisory board member of the Pan African Centre of Mathematics (PACM) based in Tanzania between 2003 and 2005. A board member of the Centre for Applied Research in Mathematical Sciences (CARMS) at Inmore University in Kenya and an associate member of the National Institute of Theoretical Physics (NITheP) in South Africa. In 2012, he became a fellow of the African Academy of Sciences and in 2013, he became a fellow of the Papua New Guinea Mathematical Society in recognition of his outreach contributions.

== Award and honours ==
In 2003, he received the African Mathematics Union (AMU) and the International Conference of Mathematical Sciences (ICMS) Young African Medal Award. In 2012, he the African Academy of Sciences (AAS) fellowship award. In 2014, he received the Nigerian National Honour Award, MFR, for his numerous contributions to mathematics and in 2011, he won the African Union Kwame Nkrumah Award for Scientific Excellence at the Continental level for his excellent contributions to basic science in Africa. In 2021, he won Obada Prize (International) Distinguished Researcher Award.
