= Patience Mthunzi-Kufa =

South African laser scientist

Patience Mthunzi
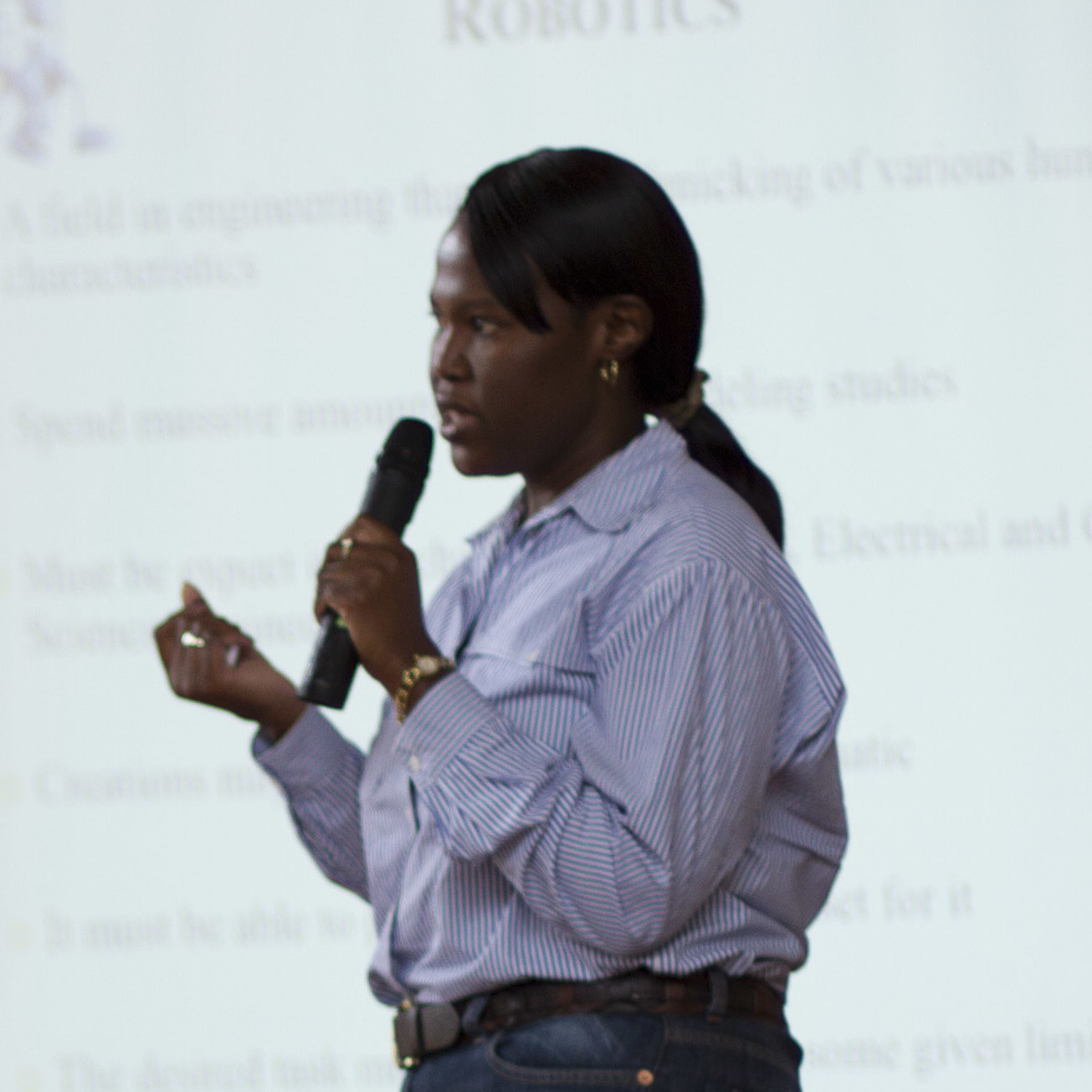
- Mthunzi in 2011
- Born: 2 May 1976 (age 50)
- Education: University of St Andrews; Rand Afrikaans University
- Occupation: Physicist
- Awards: Order of Mapungubwe Bronze Award, 2012
- Scientific career
- Fields: Biophotonics
- Institutions: Council for Scientific and Industrial Research
- Thesis: Optical sorting and photo-transfection of mammalian cells
- Doctoral advisor: Kishan Dholakia

Patience Mthunzi-Kufa (born 2 May 1976) is a South African physicist and head of biophotonics research at the Council for Scientific and Industrial Research. She received the Order of Mapungubwe in Bronze.

== Early life and education ==
Patience Mthunzi-Kufa (Patience Mthunzi) was born on 2 May 1976, in Orlando, Soweto. She attended Reasöma Secondary School and enrolled for bachelor's degree in Psychology. She became interested in biological science, and switched majors, graduating from Rand Afrikaans University in 1999. At the same institution, she completed postgraduate degrees in Biochemistry. She cites her aunt as inspiration: a teacher, and the only member of her family to complete a master's degree.

Mthunzi began to work for the National Laser Centre in the Council for Scientific and Industrial Research, where she set up a functional cell-culture facility. Whilst at a conference in San Diego, Mthunzi-Kufa saw a presentation on optical tweezers which made her consider a career in biophotonics. It was not possible to study this in South Africa, so she moved to University of St Andrews, where she was the first South African PhD student in the discipline. She earned her PhD in 2010, "Optical sorting and photo-transfection of mammalian cells". She was a member of the SPIE students chapter in St Andrews.

== Career ==
As lead for biophotonics research at the Council for Scientific and Industrial Research, Mthunzi users high power lasers to characterise and treat disease. She uses lasers to optically manipulate cells at the microscopic scale, including:

- Embryonic stem cells for tissue engineering
- Neuroblastoma cells for neurodegenerative studies
- HIV-1 cells for targeted drug delivery in latent viral sites
- Cancer cells to study single cell processes

She visited Okinawa Institute of Science and Technology to discuss Biomedical Applications of Lasers in Biophotonics in 2013.

In 2015, Mthunzi was appointed a TED Fellow. Her TED talk, Could we cure HIV with lasers?, has been viewed over one million times. She used the opportunity to discuss wish to translate her research from petri dishes to human testing. Her talk was well received by the audience in Vancouver and scientists all over the world.

Mthunzi is concerned about the brain drain of African scientists out of South Africa. In 2014 she spoke at Girlpower UNISA. In 2016 she appeared on SABC 2 Visionaries' Lounge. She has also appeared on Moves and Shakers. She was featured on CNBC Africa. She is a contributor to Talking Heads, an African speakers platform for change-makers.

Mthunzi is co-chair of the South African Young Academy of Science. She is helping the Young African Scientists in Europe (YASE) with their 2018 meeting, dedicated to African early career researchers.

In 2022, Dr. Mthunzi-Kufa was appointed as the Deputy Chairperson of the Advisory Council on National Orders by South African President Cyril Ramaphosa.

== Awards and honours ==
- 2011 – Selected to participate in the IAP/World Economic Forum's Summer Davos conference in Dalian, China
- 2012 – Order of Mapungubwe in Bronze, awarded by Jacob Zuma
- 2012 – SPIE One to Watch
- 2012 – Forbes magazine Ten youngest power women in Africa
- 2012 – South Africa's Most Influential Women
- 2014 – Plenary speaker at the International Union of Pure and Applied Physics International Conference for Women in Physics
- 2014 – Selected to the Global Young Academy
- 2014 – Emerging Leader at Genentech, San Francisco
- 2017 – Selected to attend BRICS Young Scientist Forum in China, Zhejiang University
