= Himla Soodyall =

(b.02 07 1963) South African geneticist

- Born: 1963 (age 62–63); Durban, South Africa
- Education: University of Durban-Westville
- Alma mater: University of the Witwatersrand
- Awards: Order of Mapungubwe (Bronze) 2005
- Scientific career
- Fields: Human genetics
- Institutions: WITS Human Genomic Diversity and Disease Research Laboratory
- Thesis: (1993)
- Doctoral advisor: Trefor Jenkins
- Website: Himla Soodyall at WITS

Himla (Himladevi) Soodyall (b Durban, 1963) is a South African geneticist involved in finding some of the oldest human genetic lines, mainly focusing on Sub-Saharan Africa. Her work on DNA has pointed to southern Africa as the most likely geographic region of origin of the human species.

She is Director of the Human Genomic Diversity and Disease Research Laboratory, National Health Laboratory Service at the University of the Witwatersrand. She was awarded a Bronze Order of Mapungubwe in 2005 for her "Outstanding contributions in the field of science" in South Africa.

== Education ==
Soodyall was born in Durban and educated at Gandhi-Desai High School before obtaining a BSc and BScHons at the University of Durban-Westville and an MSc in biotechnology from the University of the Witwatersrand. Her PhD, on human population and evolutionary genetics, was obtained in 1993 under the supervision of Trefor Jenkins.

== Career ==
Soodyall spent 4 years on a Fogarty International Fellowship (from the National Institutes of Health in the United States) at Pennsylvania State University doing postdoctoral research with Mark Stoneking. In 1996 she returned to South Africa to set up her own laboratory at the South African Institute for Medical Research (now the National Health Laboratory Service). Here she conducted population and evolutionary genetics research.

In 2001 she was appointed director of the Human Genomic Diversity and Disease Research Unit at WITS. She was also invited to participate in the Genographic Project as the principal investigator for sub-Saharan Africa.

== Recognition, awards, memberships ==
- 1999 President's Award from the NRF
- 1999 WITS Vice-Chancellor's Award for research
- 2005 Order of Mapungubwe (Bronze) for her "Outstanding contributions in the field of science"

== Selected publications ==
Soodyall is the author of "A Walk in the Garden of Eden". She is also the author or co-author of more than 90 academic publications, including:

- Sahibdeen, Venesa; Crowther, Nigel J.; Soodyall, Himla; Hendry, Liesl M.; Munthali, Richard J.; Hazelhurst, Scott; Choudhury, Ananyo; Norris, Shane A.; Ramsay, Michèle; Lombard, Zané (19 July 2018). "Genetic variants in SEC16B are associated with body composition in black South Africans". Nutrition & Diabetes. 8 (1). Springer Science and Business Media LLC: 43. doi:10.1038/s41387-018-0050-0. ISSN 2044-4052. PMC 6053407. PMID 30026463.
- Soodyall, Himla; Kromberg, Jennifer G. R (2016). "Human Genetics and Genomics and Sociocultural Beliefs and Practices in South Africa". Genomics and Society. Elsevier. doi:10.1016/b978-0-12-420195-8.00016-1. ISBN 978-0-12-420195-8.
- Owers, Katharine A.; Sjödin, Per; Schlebusch, Carina M.; Skoglund, Pontus; Soodyall, Himla; Jakobsson, Mattias (5 April 2017). "Adaptation to infectious disease exposure in indigenous Southern African populations". Proceedings of the Royal Society B: Biological Sciences. 284 (1852) 20170226. The Royal Society. doi:10.1098/rspb.2017.0226. ISSN 0962-8452. PMC 5394675. PMID 28381615.
- Schlebusch, Carina M.; Malmström, Helena; Günther, Torsten; Sjödin, Per; Coutinho, Alexandra; Edlund, Hanna; Munters, Arielle R.; Vicente, Mário; Steyn, Maryna; Soodyall, Himla; Lombard, Marlize; Jakobsson, Mattias (28 September 2017). "Southern African ancient genomes estimate modern human divergence to 350,000 to 260,000 years ago". Science. 358 (6363). American Association for the Advancement of Science (AAAS): 652–655. Bibcode:2017Sci...358..652S. doi:10.1126/science.aao6266. ISSN 0036-8075. PMID 28971970.
