= Southern Africa Mathematical Sciences Association =

Mathematician professional society

The Southern Africa Mathematical Sciences Association (SAMSA) is a regional professional society for mathematicians working in countries of southern Africa. The society was founded in 1981. It has been involved in several capacity building programs, including the Masamu project of collaborative research with Auburn University in the US and the Kovalevskaia Research Grants for women mathematicians of the region.

The SAMSA also includes some members from other parts of Africa, as well as from Europe and the US.

== History ==
SAMSA was established in 1981, when it held its first conference in Botswana. Its annual meetings rotate among the member countries, and have been held every year since then without fail.

SAMSA should not be confused with the South African Mathematical Society (SAMS), which, despite the similar name, is a national society for South Africa rather than a regional one. During the apartheid era in South Africa the two organizations SAMSA and SAMS had virtually no relations. In 1997 a joint meeting of the two math societies was held at the University of Pretoria with support from the London Mathematical Society, the American Mathematical Society, and UNESCO. This conference "introduced a new era in cooperation in Mathematics in southern Africa."

== Activities ==
Besides its annual meetings, SAMSA has been involved in projects designed to form a critical mass of trained mathematicians for the member countries. For example, in 1996–2007 at the University of Zimbabwe and again in 2008–2013 at the University of Dar es Salaam, SAMSA organized Masters programs in mathematical modeling that were supported by the Norwegian government.

=== Masamu ===
Masamu (a word meaning "mathematics" in the Bantu languages of South Africa) is the name of a program of collaboration between researchers and advanced students in the US and southern Africa. It is organized jointly by SAMSA and Auburn University and is supported by the National Science Foundation. The Masamu program was founded in 2011 by the Malawian-American mathematician Overtoun Jenda, who is Assistant Provost for Special Projects and Initiatives at Auburn University and a member of SAMSA. Jenda has said that a primary objective of the program is "to strengthen mathematical sciences departments at universities in southern Africa." Stellenbosch University mathematics professor and SAMSA president Farai Nyabadza commented that, as a consequence of the Masamu project, US and European mathematicians have collaborated with talented young African mathematicians, resulting in numerous joint research papers.

=== Kovalevskaia Research Grants ===
According to Jenda, since 2011 there has been greater participation of women in SAMSA activities. Starting in 2014 SAMSA has given Kovalevskaia Research Grants at two-year intervals to two early-career women mathematicians from sub-Saharan Africa, one in pure math and one in applied math. Each award consists of US$2500 for research expenses; the grants are supported by the Kovalevskaia Fund. Past winners have included Beth Nyambura Kiratu (University of Nairobi), Theresia Marijani (University of Dar es Salaam), Winifred Mutuku (Kenyatta University), and Sameerah Jamal (University of Witwatersrand).
