= Salah Obaya =

Scientist

- Education: Mansoura University (BS 1991, MS 1994); City, University of London (PhD 1999)
- Known for: Founding Director of the Center for Photonics and Smart Materials (CPSM) at Zewail City
- Awards: Khalifa Award for Distinguished Arab Professor (2017); Order of Sciences and Arts (First Class, 2019); Egyptian State Appreciation Award in Engineering Sciences (2019); African Union Kwame Nkrumah Award for Academic Excellence (2021)
- Scientific career
- Fields: Computational photonics, nanophotonics, smart materials, renewable energy, optical communication

Salah Sabry A. Obayya is an Egyptian Professor of Photonics and the director of the Center for Photonics and Smart Materials at the Zewail City of Science and Technology. He is a member of African Academy of Sciences, Optical Society of America, the Institute of Electrical and Electronics Engineers (IEEE), and Society of Photographic Instrumentation Engineers

== Education ==
Prof Salah obtained his B. SC and M. SC in electronics and communications engineering from Mansoura University in 1991 and 1994. He received his doctorate degree in 1999 under the joint supervision of City University London and Mansoura University, Egypt.

== Career ==
In 2012, Prof Salah joined Zewail City of Science and Technology and he is currently a professor and director of the Center for Photonics and Smart Materials. However, prior to his commitment in the institution, he had taught in Brunel University, University of Leeds, and University of South Wales where was made the Founding Director of Photonics and Broadband Communications (PBC) Research Center.

== Fellowship and membership ==
He is a member of Egyptian Society of Optical Science and Applications (ESOSA), the Institute of Engineering and Technology, the Institute of Physics, the Higher Education Academy, and Institute of Electrical and Electronics Engineers, and Society, Wales Institute of Mathematical and Computational Sciences, Optical Society of America (OSA), International Society for Optical Engineering (SPIE) and Member of Applied Computational Electromagnetics Society (ACES).

== Award ==
In 2017, he won Khalifa Award for Distinguished Arab Professor in Scientific Research. In 2019, he won the First Class Order of Sciences and Arts and the State Appreciation Award in Engineering Sciences. In 2021 he won the African Union Kwame Nakroma Awards for Academic Excellence.
