= National Health Laboratory Service =

South African national government agency

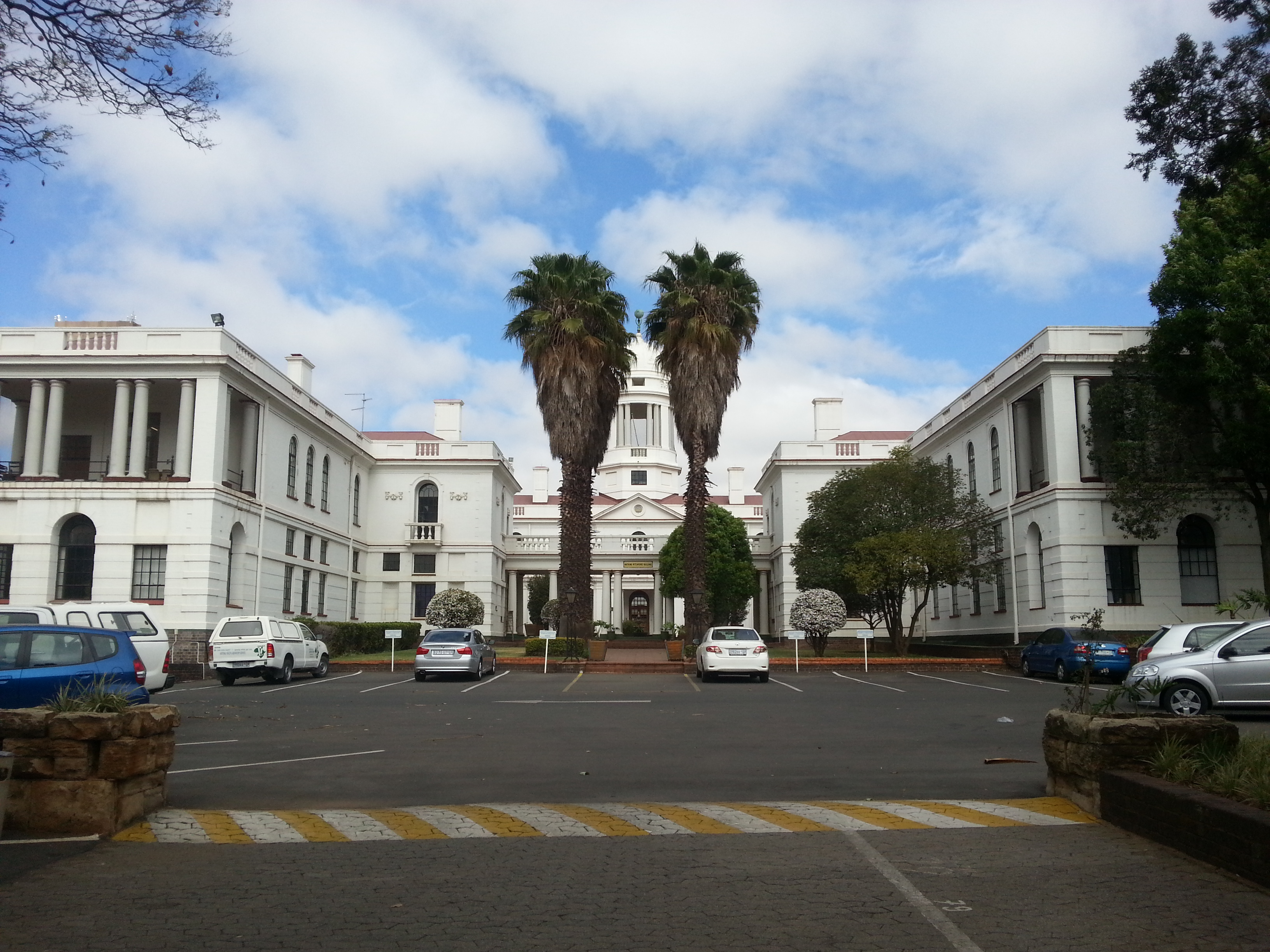

Agency overview
- Formed: 2001; 25 years ago
- Preceding agencies: South African Institute for Medical Research; National Centre for Occupational Health; National Institute for Virology
- Jurisdiction: South Africa
- Employees: ≈ 8000
- Annual budget: R1.082 billion (2019/20); ▼R747 million (2020/21); ▼R641.8 million (2021/22)
- Parent department: Department of Health
- Key documents: National Health Act 61 of 2003; National Health Laboratory Service Act 37 of 2000
- Website: www.nhls.ac.za

The National Health Laboratory Service (NHLS) is a South African national government institution established in 2001. It was created by merging the South African Institute for Medical Research (SAIMR), the National Centre for Occupational Health and the National Institute for Virology. It also absorbed various provincial health department and university-run pathology laboratories.

The NHLS is the diagnostic pathology service for the public sector in South Africa. A network of 265 laboratories service all public hospitals and clinics in the country.

== Divisions and subsidiaries ==
Besides the network of pathology laboratories operated by the NHLS the institution also has a number of specialist divisions:

=== National Institute for Communicable Diseases ===
The National Institute for Communicable Diseases (NICD) was created by combining various structures inherited from the NHLS's parent organisations. The former National Institute for Virology was combined with the former SAIMR's specialist laboratories of microbiology, parasitology, and entomology to create a communicable diseases institute with a public health orientation, comparable to the Centers for Disease Control and Prevention of the United States.

=== National Institute for Occupational Health ===
The National Institute for Occupational Health (NIOH) investigates occupational diseases and performs occupational environment analysis through a variety of services which include statutory autopsy, advisory and information services, health hazard evaluation and specialist laboratory services.

The services and units of the NIOH are:

- Analytical Services
- Asbestos Information, Identification, Counting, Monitoring and Evaluation Services
- Autopsy Examination Services
- Bioaerosol Monitoring Unit
- Compensation Service
- Diagnostic Services
- Electron Microscopy Service
- Epidemiology Surveillance
- Ergonomics Unit
- Genotoxicity Assessment Unit
- Health Risk Assessment Unit
- Industrial Toxicology Information Services
- Library Services
- Micro and Nano - Particle Sizing
- Occupational Allergy Unit
- Occupational Health Risk Assessments
- Occupational Hygiene Audits
- Occupational Hygiene Surveys
- Occupational Medicine Referral Clinic
- Particle Toxicology/Nanotoxicology Unit
- Query Handling Service
- Toxicogenomics Unit
- Waterborne Pathogens Unit

==== National Cancer Registry ====
The NIOH also manages the National Cancer Registry which is responsible for analysing newly diagnosed cancer cases and to report annual cancer incidence rates. The NCR collects data from public and private histopathology, cytology and haematology laboratories across the whole country.

=== South African Vaccine Producers ===
South African Vaccine Producers (SAVP) is a subsidiary of the National Health Laboratory Service, responsible for manufacturing vaccines and antivenoms. SAVP's Antivenom Unit is the only manufacturer of antivenom for a number of venomous snakes found in Africa as well as scorpion and spider antivenom.

==== Antivenom shortage ====
At the beginning of 2022 and for the following year, South Africa experienced a shortage of antivenom. The South African Vaccine Producers said that they faced several challenges, including equipment failure due to power outages and supply issues. Questions were raised as to why a five-year supply declined to a shortage of antivenom. The National Health Laboratory Service said it distributed antivenom to 124 facilities but demand was still exceeding supply.

== Controversies ==
=== Finances ===
During 2011 the Treatment Action Campaign, an HIV/AIDS non-governmental organisation criticised the national government for allowing the financial viability of the NHLS to be threatened due to the failure of the health departments of Gauteng and KwaZulu-Natal to pay the NHLS for services rendered. The financial problems continued into 2012.

=== Labour disputes and irregularities in procurements ===
In September 2024, the Labour Court upheld the dismissal of former CEO Joyce Mogale and late CFO Sikhumbuzo Zulu who were fired in 2019; they had been suspended since February 2017 for irregularities in procurements totalling R200 million. The court also ordered Mogale to pay R22 million in damages to the NHLS. The court criticised the NHLS for inadequate control and accountability. Mogale is separately facing criminal charges for allegedly contravening the Public Finance Management Act.
