= National Science and Technology Forum =

South African organisation

The National Science and Technology Forum (NSTF) is a non-profit company representing South African organisations in the public and private sector with an interest in science, engineering, technology, and innovation. Its aim is to promote science, engineering, and technology, and to engage with related government policies. Established in 1995, the NSTF organizes annual awards for research and development excellence in South Africa.

== Membership ==
There are more than 100 member organisations in six categories within the NSTF. These include:

- Eskom
- Federation of Unions of South Africa
- Health Department
- National Health Laboratory Service
- Rand Water
- South African Nuclear Energy Corporation
- Telecommunication Department

== Notable award winners ==
Amongst the notable South Africans who have received an award from the NSTF are:

- George Ellis
- Janice Limson
- Johann Lutjeharms
- Tshilidzi Marwala
- Tim Noakes
