= Academy of Science of South Africa =

National science academy

- Formation: 1996; 30 years ago
- Headquarters: Lynnwood, Pretoria, South Africa
- Coordinates: 25.74579°S 28.27505°E
- Chairperson: Prof. Jonathan Jansen
- Parent organisation: Department of Science and Innovation
- Subsidiaries: Council for Scientific and Industrial Research; Human Sciences Research Council; National Advisory Council on Innovation; National Research Foundation; South African Council Agency for Natural Scientific Professions; South African National Space Agency; Technology Innovation Agency
- Website: https://www.assaf.org.za/

The Academy of Science of South Africa (ASSAf) is the national science academy in South Africa. It was started in 1996, and encompasses all fields of scientific work. Its legal foundation is the Academy of Science of South Africa Act, Act 67 of 2001, which came into operation in May 2002.

The ASSAf was inaugurated in March 1996 by the former President of South Africa and patron of the academy, Nelson Mandela.

In 2021, the academy had 632 members.

== History ==
For about one century, the national science 'academy' comprised two separate institutions – the Royal Society (from the UK) and the Suid-Afrikaanse Akademie vir Wetenskap en Kuns (SAAWK). SAAWK had an Afrikaans-language focus and was heavily supported by South African business. Based in Pretoria, it was established in 1909 and was the national academy (the statute was passed in 1950) until democracy in 1994. It was structured in two 'faculties': human and natural sciences, with a journal for each. While it still awards numerous medals and prizes, it is no longer recognised as the national science academy of South Africa.

With the dawn of democracy in the early 1990s, it was realised that a new model was required. The Foundation for Research and Development (now the National Research Foundation) invited the Royal Society of South Africa, SAAWK and the Agricultural Economics Association of South Africa (AEASA) to plan a new academy.

Vigorous debates ensued, with South Africa's scientific community in flux. A democratic model based on empirical inquiry was agreed to be essential to the new academy, inclusive of all South Africa's leading academics. In 1994, a plan and a draft constitution were adopted.

In 1995, 100 founder members were elected, and the Academy of Science of South Africa was launched in 1996 with then-President Nelson Mandela as patron. When the ASSAf Statute was passed, Act 67 of 2001, and the SAAWK statute was revoked, ASSAf became the official science academy of South Africa. The academy had a central niche which differed from the previous academy: rather than having a merely honorific function, it was to provide professional, independent evidence-based advice. With the grant-in-aid from the Department of Science and Technology (DST), the academy moved to central Pretoria.

In 2001, the DST commissioned the academy's first study on South African scholarly journals. The study consisted of a steering committee comprising a number of stakeholders, and a consensus panel which would later release a report with a number of recommendations. In 2006, the report entitled A Strategic Approach to Research Publishing in SA was released.

The year 2004 brought a breakthrough when the African Science Academies Development Initiative (ASADI) led by the United States National Academies, selected ASSAf as an intensive partner, guaranteeing funding and mentoring for 5 to 7 years. This led to the first symposium on evidence-based practice theory and best-practice.

This was followed by the study on HIV/AIDS, TB and nutrition, ASSAf's first self-initiated consensus study. The report was released in October 2007.

Studies currently in progress include:

- State of the humanities in SA
- PhD study: enhancing the production of postgraduates in South Africa
- Scholarly books: their production, use and evaluation in South Africa today
- Clinical research and related training in South Africa
- Improved nutritional assessment in South Africa
- Low carbon cities
- Forum-based study on science, technology, engineering and mathematics (STEM) education
- Forum-based study on science for poverty alleviation

The academy established a number of awards, the most notable being the Science-for-Society gold medals, two of which are awarded annually. In conjunction with the DST and the Academy of Sciences for the Developing World (TWAS), the annual TWAS prize for young scientists is awarded. The Sydney Brenner Fellowship is also awarded by ASSAf, along with merit awards and certificates.

IN 2001, the academy took over the publication of the South African Journal of Science (SAJS), an indexed ISI journal. The academy has been instrumental in the establishment of SciELO SA, a free open access, fully indexed journal platform. The SAJS was the first journal to be uploaded to this platform.

In 2004, the academy launched Quest: Science for South Africa, a quarterly popular science magazine. In addition, a quarterly newsletter is published. The academy has also released a number of statements on a variety of topics such as xenophobia, climate change, and ocean acidification, both by itself, and in conjunction with other science academies.

As of 2019 Himla Soodyall replaced Roseanne Diab as the chief executive officer.

== Objectives ==
The key objective of the academy is to promote and apply scientific thinking in the service of society. To this end, the academy shall:

- Use the common ground of scientific knowledge and activity to remove barriers between people and obstacles to full development of their intellectual capacity;
- Endeavour in every possible way to inspire, promote and recognise excellence in scientific and technical practice;
- Investigate and publicly report on various matters, in its own discretion or at the request of government or organisations in civil society, to promote and apply scientific thinking in the service of society;
- Promote science education and a culture of science in the population at large;
- Maintain strict independence while consulting other organisations and individuals in the widest manner possible;
- Endeavour to establish and develop close relations with scientific organisations in South Africa and with similar academies in other countries; and
- Take any other action that it may consider necessary towards the attainment of its key objective.

== Relevance ==
The strategic priorities of the academy are closely matched to those of the nation, focusing particularly on the need for the greatly enhanced availability of high-level human capital and an increased use of the country's best intellectual expertise in generating evidence-based policy advice that is practically feasible.

The academy is aligned to national policy as dictated in the White Paper on Science and Technology and the National Research and Development Strategy. It also seeks to meet other national priorities, such as the Accelerated and Shared Growth Initiative for South Africa, the Joint Initiative for Priority Skills Acquisition and the Grand Challenges of the Department of Science and Technology.

== See also ==
- Open access in South Africa
- Suid-Afrikaanse Akademie vir Wetenskap en Kuns
- Notable members of the academy
