= Royal Society of South Africa =

South African learned society

- Formation: Philosophical Society of South Africa (1877; 149 years ago); Royal Society of South Africa (1909; 117 years ago)
- Members: 215 Fellows
- Website: royalsocietysa.org.za

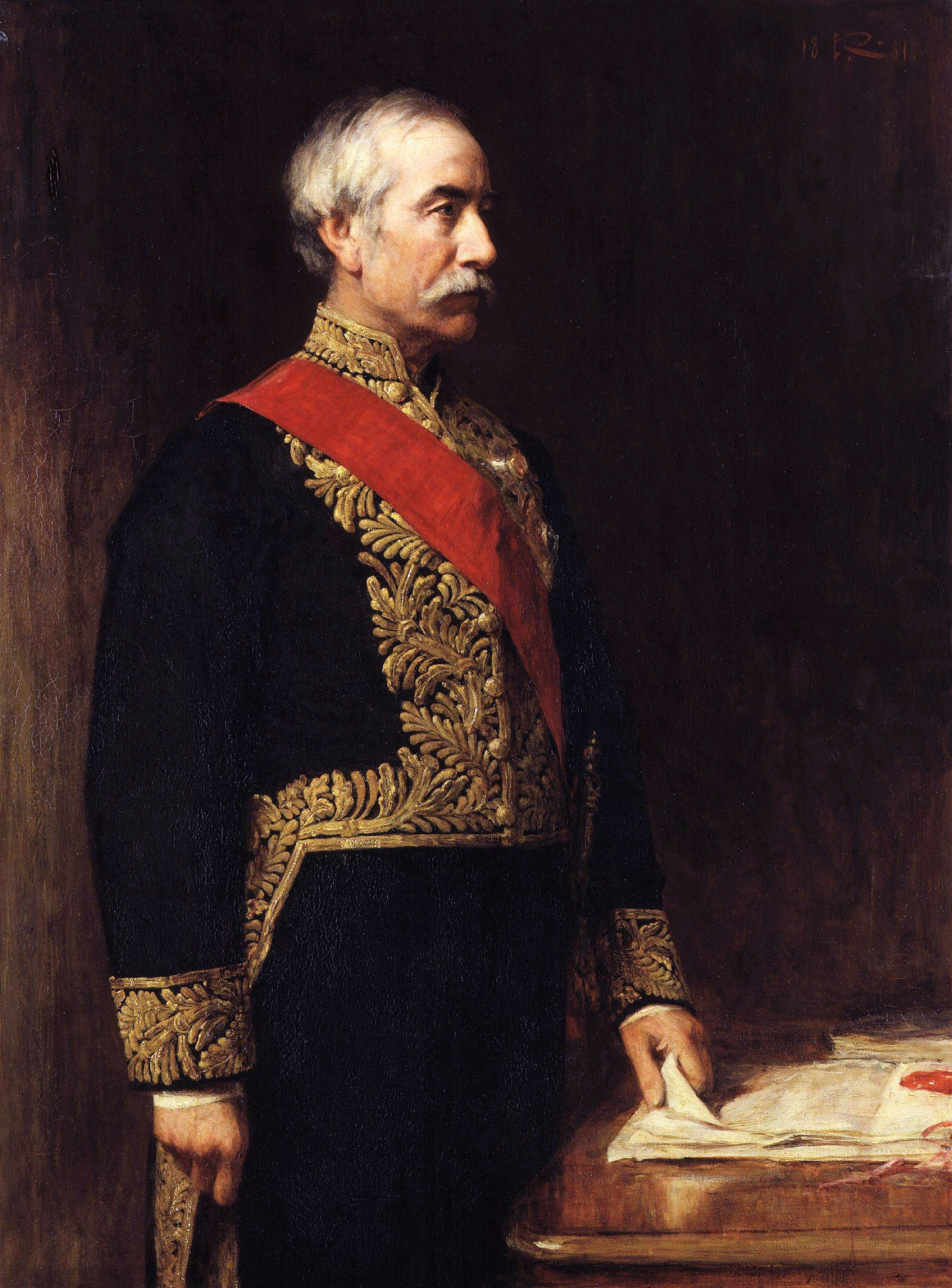
Sir Henry Bartle Frere, 1st Bt by Sir George Reid

The Royal Society of South Africa is a learned society composed of eminent South African scientists and academics. The society was granted its royal charter by King Edward VII in 1908, nearly a century after Capetonians first began to conceive of a national scholarly society. The 1877 founder and first president of the society was Sir Bartle Frere (1815–1884).

Fellows are entitled to the post-nominal letters FRSSAf.

== History ==
The society has its origins in the South African Institution, dating from 1825. The museum of the South African Institution eventually formed the present South African Museum in Cape Town. In 1877, the South African Philosophical Society was founded. In 1908 the society was granted a royal charter along the lines of that of the Royal Society of London and with the title of the Royal Society of South Africa. In the same year, the Transactions of the Royal Society of South Africa began to appear, immediately succeeding those of the South African Philosophical Society, which had commenced in 1878. The headquarters of the society are in Cape Town.

== Members, fellows and foreign associates ==
Persons with a demonstrable record of interest and activity in science may apply for membership of the Royal Society of South Africa. The application must be supported by two existing fellows or members of the society. Members receive all notices and communications of the society, including its Transactions, participate generally in the society's activities and work towards the fulfilment of its aims. Persons, usually members of the society, who have done outstanding work in the furtherance of science in South Africa, as evidenced by publications, and who are resident in South Africa, may be elected to fellowship of the Royal Society of South Africa.

Although there is no statutory limit to the number of fellows, no more than ten such ordinary fellows may be elected in any one year. The procedures for election continue to be elaborate and detailed in order to ensure that the high standards of the fellowship are maintained. Only fellows and honorary fellows participate in the fellowship elections. Honorary fellowships are on rare occasions awarded to persons who have done scientific research of exceptional distinction in South Africa. Foreign associates are appointed from amongst persons who are not resident in South Africa, who are worthy of fellowship of the society and who have a full, current interest in South African Science and its advancement, to the country's and the society's benefit.

== Publications ==
The peer-reviewed Transactions of the Royal Society of South Africa is listed amongst the interdisciplinary journals by the Institute for Scientific Information in Philadelphia. Biographies of deceased fellows, annual reports of the society and presidential addresses are amongst the material that is also published in the Transactions.

== Funding ==
The Royal Society of South Africa is totally independent of government and receives no state-derived subsidy other than a small grant towards the cost of publications. It depends virtually entirely on the subscriptions of its members and fellows, on donations, bequests and on limited capital funds.

== See also ==
- Fellows of the Royal Society of South Africa
- List of Royal Societies
