= List of alumni of the University of Cape Town =

This list of the notable alumni of the University of Cape Town is divided into the six faculties of the university: Commerce, Humanities, Sciences, Health Sciences, Engineering, and Law.

== Commerce ==
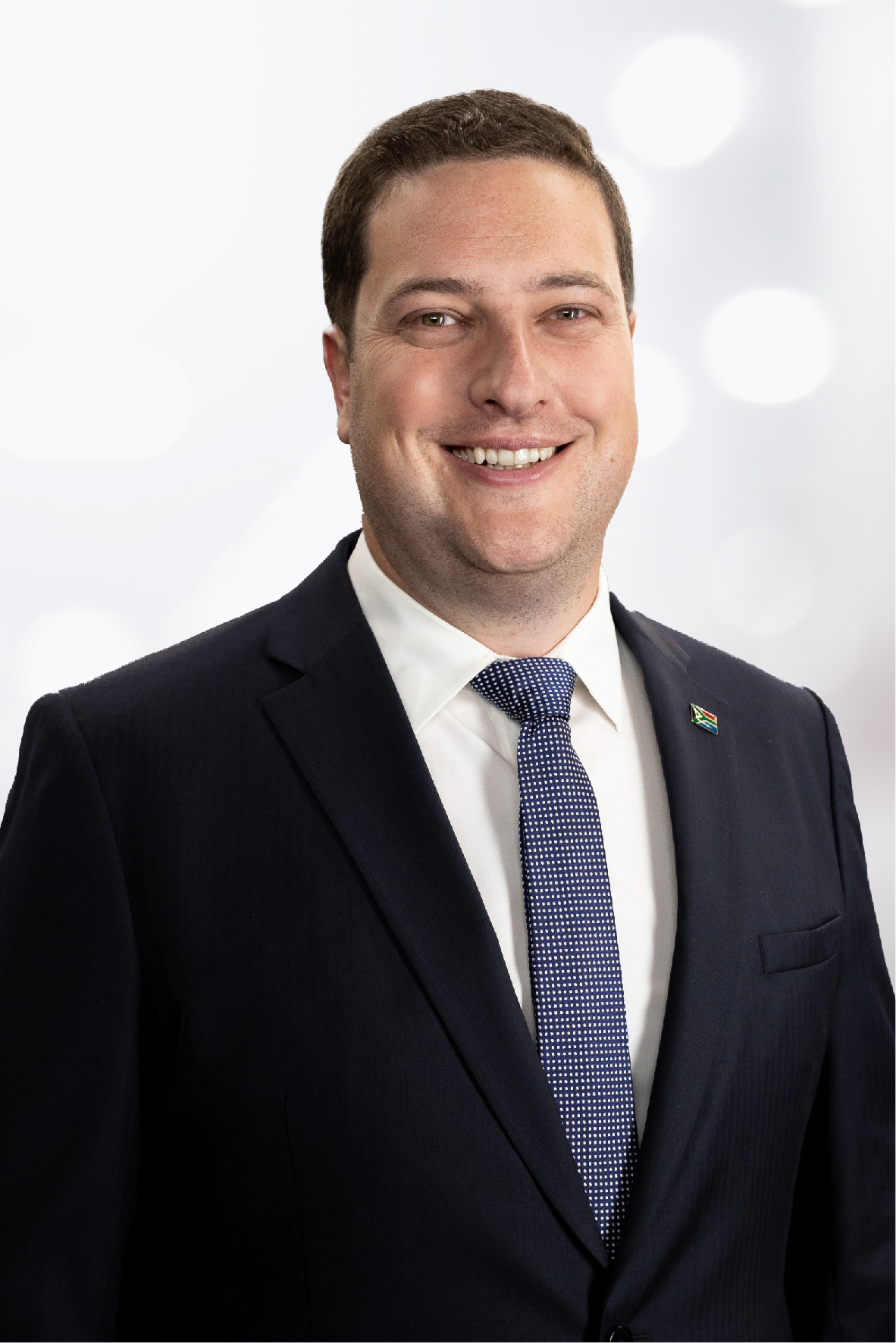
- Geordin Hill-Lewis studied commerce at the University of Cape Town
  Raymond Ackerman, businessman, who purchased the Pick n Pay supermarket group from its founder; philanthropist
- Roelof Botha, grandson of Pik Botha; began his career as an actuary and became a venture capitalist
- Polly Courtice, founder Director of the Cambridge Institute for Sustainability Leadership and member of the supervisory board of Mercedes-Benz Group
- Alide Dasnois, journalist and newspaper editor
- Chelsy Davy, ex-girlfriend of Britain's Prince Harry
- Sir Bradley Fried, ex-chief executive of Investec bank; current chairman of Goldman Sachs International
- Geordin Hill-Lewis, Mayor of Cape Town (2021– )
- Nick Mallett, played for and later coached the Springboks, South Africa's national rugby union team
- Tsakani Maluleke, Auditor-General of South Africa (2020–present)
- Tshediso Matona, CEO of Eskom
- Kimeshan Naidoo, entrepreneur and engineer, founder of Unibuddy.
- Harold Pupkewitz (1915–2012), Namibian entrepreneur
- Mark Shuttleworth, billionaire entrepreneur; founder of Canonical Ltd; sponsor of the Ubuntu Linux distribution operating system; second space tourist

== Humanities ==
- Lauren Beukes, international best-selling author of The Shining Girls, winner of Arthur C. Clarke Award
- Peter Busse, AIDS activist and educator
- J. M. Coetzee, professor emeritus, Literature, 2003
- Jean Comaroff, professor of anthropology at the University of Chicago
- John Comaroff, professor of anthropology at the University of Chicago
- Harold Cressy, head teacher and first coloured person to gain a degree in South Africa
- Janette Deacon, archaeologist specialising in heritage management and rock art conservation
- Roger Ebert, film critic, graduated with an English degree as part of a Rotary International program
- David Fanning, Emmy Award-winning producer of Frontline
- Damon Galgut, novelist and playwright
- Bobby Godsell, Masters of Arts, later CEO of AngloGold Ashanti and Chairman of Eskom
- Johannes de Villiers Graaff, professor of welfare economics; economist
- Adrian Guelke, Professor of Comparative Politics at Queen's University Belfast
- Jan Hendrik Hofmeyr, deputy prime minister of South Africa, obtained an M.A. at the age of 17
- Philip Edgecumbe Hughes, New Testament scholar, Professor at Westminster Theological Seminary
- Edward Neville Isdell, former CEO of the Coca-Cola Company
- Gail Kelly, CEO of Westpac; 8th most influential woman in the world, according to Forbes magazine
- Loren Kruger, academic and author
- David Lewis-Williams, professor emeritus of Cognitive Archaeology at the University of the Witwatersrand specialising in Upper-Palaeolithic and Bushmen rock art
- Gwen Lister, South African-born Namibian journalist; anti-apartheid activist; founder of The Namibian
- Nicolaas Petrus van Wyk Louw, Afrikaans-language poet, playwright and scholar
- Archie Mafeje, anthropologist and activist who significantly contributed to the decolonization of African identity and its historical past, criticising anthropology's typically Eurocentric techniques and beliefs; also known for the "Mafeje affair"
- Thabo Makgoba, Archbishop of Cape Town, PhD from the University of Cape Town
- Steven Markovitz, award-winning film and television producer
- Ebrahim Patel, held positions as South African Minister of Trade and Industry and as the Minister of Economic Development, on the University Council of UCT; former staffer in the Southern African Labour and Development Research Unit in the School of Economics
- André du Pisani, political scientist and professor at University of Namibia
- Nik Rabinowitz, comedian, actor and author
- Mamphela Ramphele, managing director of the World Bank; former Vice-Chancellor of UCT
- Isaac Schapera, Professor of Anthropology at the London School of Economics; leading expert in the anthropology of South African tribesmen
- Nora Schimming-Chase, Namibia's first ambassador to Germany, obtained a teaching diploma from UCT in 1961
- Carmel Schrire, Professor of Archaeology, Rutgers University
- Robert Carl-Heinz Shell, South African author and professor of African Studies
- Lady Skollie, feminist artist and activist
- Lady Kitty Spencer (born 1990), English model
- Andries Treurnicht, founder and the leader of the Conservative Party in South Africa
- Elizabeth Anne Voigt, archaeologist and director of the McGregor Museum
- Mary Watson, 2006 winner of the Caine Prize for African Writing
- Bronwyn Nielsen, South African broadcaster and media executive

=== Music ===
- Andrew-John Bethke, composer, conductor, and organist
- Richard Cock, conductor
- Cromwell Everson, classical music composer and composer of the first Afrikaans opera
- Ernest Fleischmann, impresario best known for his tenure at the Los Angeles Philharmonic
- Malcolm Forsyth, musician; composer; Canadian Composer of the Year; Juno Award winner; member of Order of Canada
- Hendrik Hofmeyr, composer and music theorist; winner of the 1997 Queen Elisabeth of Belgium Composition Prize; Professor of Music at the South African College of Music, University of Cape Town
- Galt MacDermot, composer of the musical Hair
- Melanie Scholtz, vocalist, operas, jazz, pop, r&b, and classical music; graduated from the School of Opera
- Barry Smith, organist, conductor, musicologist, former associate professor of music at the South African College of Music, University of Cape Town
- Désirée Talbot, operatic soprano and one of the founding members of the UCT Opera Company
- Pretty Yende, operatic soprano

=== Fine art ===
- Anne Bean, British installation and performance artist
- Alex Binaris, fashion model
- Breyten Breytenbach, author
- Roger Ebert, Pulitzer Award-winning American film critic and writer
- Kai Lossgott, interdisciplinary artist
- Simphiwe Ndzube, visual artist
- Claudette Schreuders, South African sculptor and painter
- Jonathan Shapiro, South African political cartoonist known as "Zapiro"
- Marjorie van Heerden, South African writer and illustrator of children's books
- Pauline Vogelpoel, arts administrator at the Contemporary Art Society and Tate Gallery

=== Drama ===
- Jodi Balfour, actress
- Katlego Danke, actress
- Nadia Davids, playwright, novelist, and author of short stories, and screenplays
- Vincent Ebrahim, known for his role on The Kumars at No. 42
- Richard E. Grant, actor
- Kagiso Lediga, stand-up comedian, actor and director
- Zolani Mahola, lead singer of the South African band Freshlyground
- Zandile Msutwana, actress
- Koleka Putuma, poet and theatre-maker

== Sciences ==
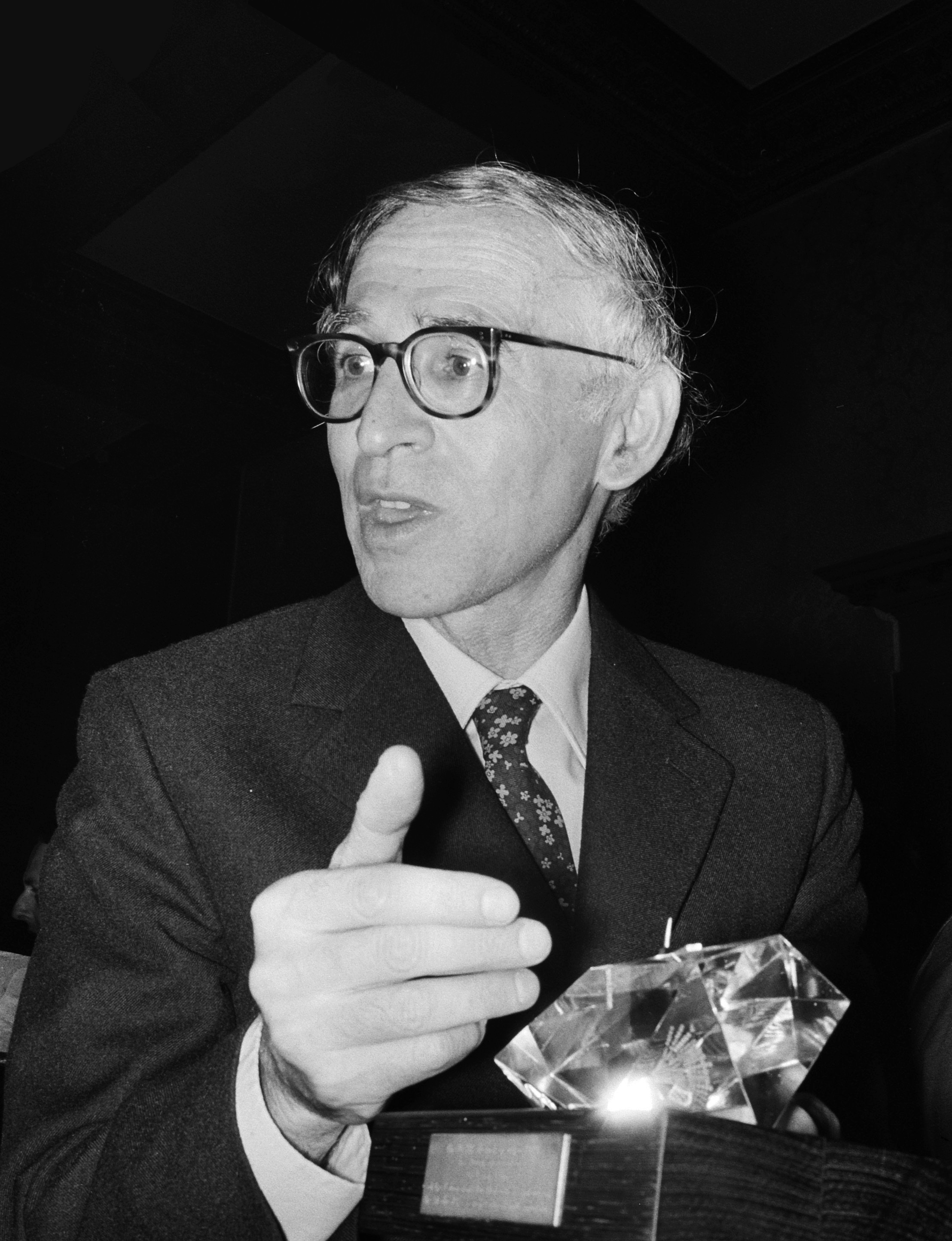
Sir Aaron Klug, winner of the Nobel Prize in Chemistry 1982

- Allan McLeod Cormack, Medicine, 1979
- Hilary Deacon (1936–2010), archaeologist and professor at the University of Stellenbosch
- Emanuel Derman, Goldman Sachs financial engineer and author of My Life As A Quant
- Jonathan M. Dorfan, director of the Stanford Linear Accelerator Center
- Mulalo Doyoyo, South African engineer and inventor; known for inventing cenocell, a cementless concrete
- George Ellis, cosmologist; collaborator with Stephen Hawking; winner of the 2004 Templeton Prize
- Tim Hawarden, astrophysicist
- Michael David Kirchmann, architect and developer, founder of GDSNY
- Sir Aaron Klug, Nobel Prize in Chemistry in 1982 (MSc)
- Nana Klutse, climate scientist and lecturer
- Marie Korsaga, astrophysicist
- Paul Maritz, former Microsoft executive; VMware CEO
- Magdalena Sauer, first woman to qualify as an architect in South Africa
- Sydney Harold Skaife, South African entomologist and naturalist
- Stanley Skewes, number theorist most famous in popular mathematics for his bound for the point of changeover in magnitude between the number of primes up to a certain number and an important approximation of this, which was for many years the largest finite number ever legitimately used in a research paper
- Edith Layard Stephens, South African botanist
- Frank Talbot (1930–2024), ichthyologist; PhD. 1959; former director of the Australian Museum
- Willem Van Biljon, former co-founder of Mosaic Software, acquired by S1 Corporation; founder of Nimbula, a startup funded by Sequoia Capital
- Richard van der Riet Woolley, British astronomer who became Astronomer Royal

== Health sciences ==
- Neil Aggett, South African trade union leader and labour activist who died in custody after 70 days' detention without trial
- Frances Ames, first woman to receive an MD degree from UCT; first female professor at UCT
- Christiaan Barnard, professor, performed the world's first heart transplant at Groote Schuur Hospital
- Enid Charles, statistician and demographer
- Alan Christoffels, bioinformatics scientist, academic, and an author
- David Cooper, theorist and leader in the anti-psychiatry movement
- Adrian Gelb, anesthesiologist and academic
- Tamaryn Green, medical doctor, Miss South Africa 2018 and 1st runner-up at Miss Universe 2018
- Cecil Helman, physician, medical anthropologist and author
- Jessie Rose Innes (1860–1943), nurse and suffragist
- Margaret Keay (1911–1998), plant pathologist
- Bongani Mayosi, cardiologist and Dean of the Faculty of Medicine
- Mervyn Maze, anaesthesiologist, medical researcher and academic
- Riaad Moosa, comedian, actor and doctor
- Jean Nachega, physician, infectious diseases doctor and academic
- Jessie Rose-Innes, nurse, social campaigner and suffragist
- Gisela Sole, professor of physiotherapy at University of Otago in New Zealand
- Max Theiler, virologist awarded the Nobel Prize in Physiology or Medicine in 1951 for developing a vaccine against yellow fever
- Louis Vogelpoel, cardiologist and one of the founding members of the Cardiac Clinic at Groote Schuur Hospital as well as a highly regarded horticultural scholar and researcher
- Carolyn Williamson, virologist and microbiologist, professor of medical virology
- Heather Zar, paediatric pulmonologist and Chair Department of Paediatrics

== Social sciences ==
- John Karlin, industrial psychologist whose research led to the rectangular push-button telephone
- Debora Patta, broadcast journalist and television producer
- Joel Pollak, editor-in-chief of Breitbart News
- Josina Z. Machel, women's rights activist
- Wanga Zembe-Mkabile, social policy researcher

== Law ==
- Professor Reg Austin, founding Dean of the Faculty of Law at University of Zimbabwe; Zimbabwean academic who served the Commonwealth Secretariat as Director of Legal and Constitutional Affairs from 1993 to 1998. He had previously been Dean of the Law Faculty at the University of Zimbabwe (1982-92) and Chief Electoral Officer of the United Nations Transitional Authority in Cambodia (1992-93).
- Morris Alexander (1877–1946), member of parliament
- David Bloomberg, former Mayor of Cape Town (1973–1975) and defence attorney for Dimitri Tsafendas, who fatally stabbed the Prime Minister, Dr H.F. Verwoerd, in Parliament in 1966
- Sheila Camerer, South African politician; former Deputy Minister of Justice; long-serving Member of Parliament of the main opposition the Democratic Alliance; ambassador to Bulgaria; completed a Bachelor of Law degree at UCT in 1964
- Ryan Coetzee, South African politician; former CEO of the Democratic Alliance and Shadow Minister of Economic Development; chief strategist for Western Cape premier Helen Zille; graduated from UCT in 1994
- Beric John Croome, Advocate of the High Court of South Africa; Chartered Accountant CA (SA); taxpayers' rights pioneer; completed a Bachelor of Commerce degree (1980), Certificate in the Theory of Accountancy (1981) and a PhD (Commercial Law) (2008) at UCT
- Ezra Davids, Chair of Bowmans and leading mergers & acquisitions expert, named as South African DealMaker of the Year for 2009.
- Zainunnisa "Cissie" Gool, anti-apartheid political and civil rights leader
- Zuleikha Hassan, Kenyan politician; Kwale County Woman Representative and Member of Parliament
- Stephen Jolly, Australian activist and politician
- Jeffrey Jowell, was appointed Knight Commander of the Order of St. Michael and St. George (KCMG) for "services to human rights, democracy and the rule of law in Europe".
- Fana Mokoena, South African politician and actor, member of the National Assembly of South Africa and a delegate to the National Council of Provinces
- Clotilde Mukamurera, president of the High Court of Commerce of Rwanda
- Ian Neilson, Executive Deputy Mayor of Cape Town
- Dullah Omar, South African anti-apartheid activist; lawyer; Justice of the Constitutional Court of South Africa; minister in the South African cabinet from 1994 until his death
- Kate O'Regan, former Constitutional Court of South Africa judge
- Judge Taswell Papier, Judge of the Western Cape High Court* Albie Sachs, Justice of the Constitutional Court of South Africa
- Kate Savage, formerly Judge of the South African Labour Appeal Court, appointed to South Africa's Constitutional Court in April 2026.
- James Selfe, long-serving Member of Parliament with the Democratic Alliance; chairperson of the party's federal council; holds a master's degree from UCT
- Donald Woods, South African journalist and anti-apartheid activist
- Dianna Yach, anti-apartheid activist in the 80s and 90s, now Chair of the Mauerberger Foundation Fund, South Africa.
- Percy Yutar, South Africa's first Jewish attorney-general and prosecutor of Nelson Mandela in the 1963 Rivonia Treason Trial.
- As of 2023, Corey Mbonge was the first and only African American to graduate from UCT's LLB program in its 160 year history.
