= Government Houses of South Africa =

A Government House is any residence used by governors-general, governors and lieutenant-governors in the Commonwealth and the British Empire. Government Houses serve as the venue for governors' official business, as well as the many receptions and functions hosted by the occupant. Sometimes, the term Government House is used as a metonym for the governor or their office.

The following is a list of former Government Houses of South Africa, from the British colonial era in the country, which are now defunct.

- Transvaal, Government House of Transvaal
- Cape Province, Government House of Cape Province
- Orange Free State, Government House, Bloemfontein
- Natal, Government House of Natal

The current Government of South Africa has its own official residences for the President and Cabinet Ministers.

== See also ==
- Colonialism
- British Empire
- History of South Africa (1815–1910)
- Cape Colony
- Union of South Africa
- List of governors of British South African colonies
- History of South Africa
- Government Houses of the British Empire
