= Elsworth (disambiguation) =

Elsworth may refer to:

- Elsworth, the UK village
- Elsworth (skipjack), the sailboat
- Elsworth Johnson, a politician
- David Elsworth, a horse trainer
- Kate Elsworth, a musical artist
- Margaret Elsworth, a charity worker
- Scott Elsworth, a paralympian
