= Tuynhuys =

Office of the president of South Africa

Coordinates: 33°55′39″S 18°25′07″E

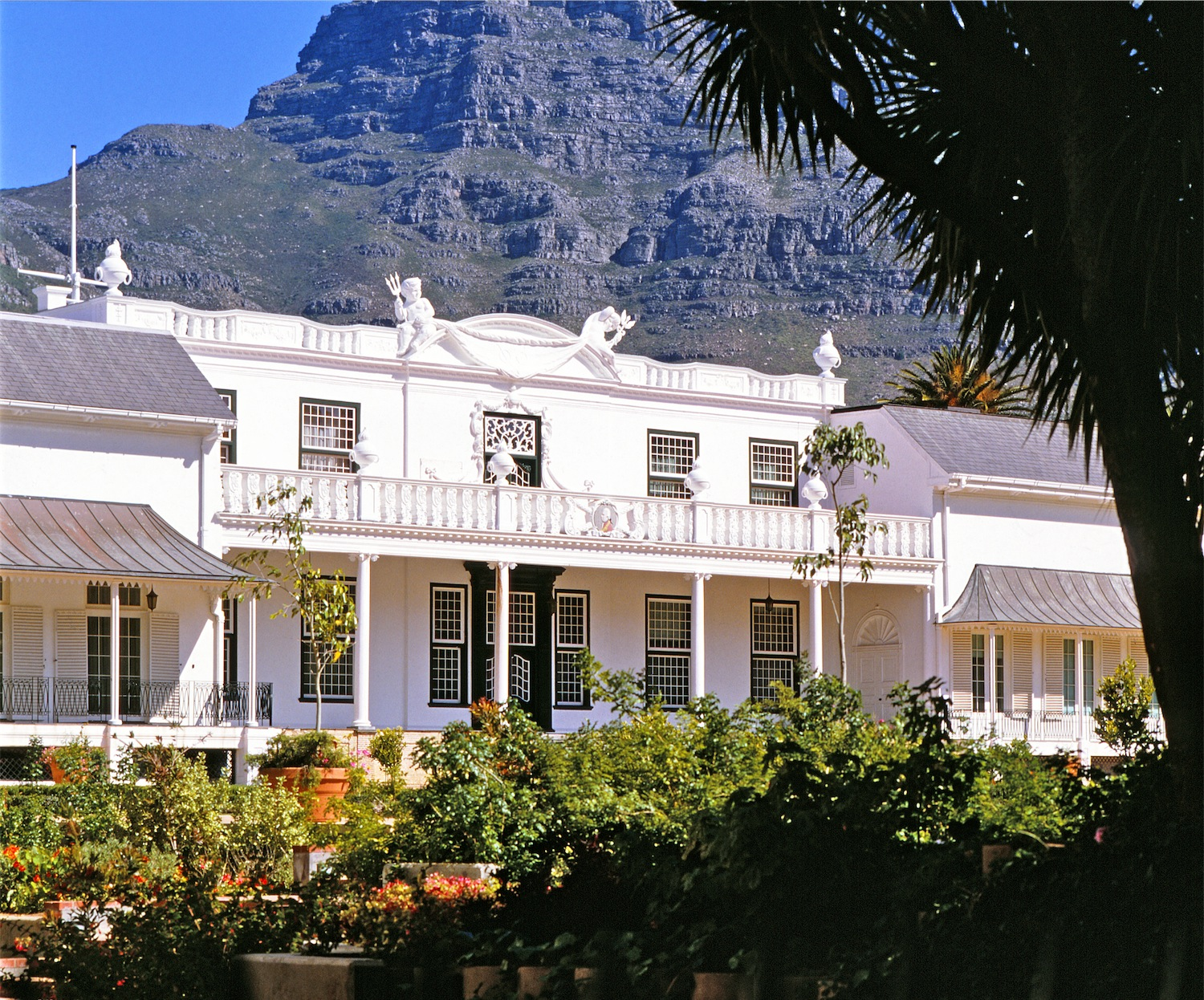
- The Tuynhuys in 1988
- Interactive map of Tuynhuys
- Location: Cape Town, South Africa

History
- Built: 1682 (in 1682 the toolshed that was built in 1674 was converted into a guesthouse, enlarged and renovated until 1751)

Site notes
- Architect: Josephus Jones
- Architectural style: Cape Dutch

Tuynhuys

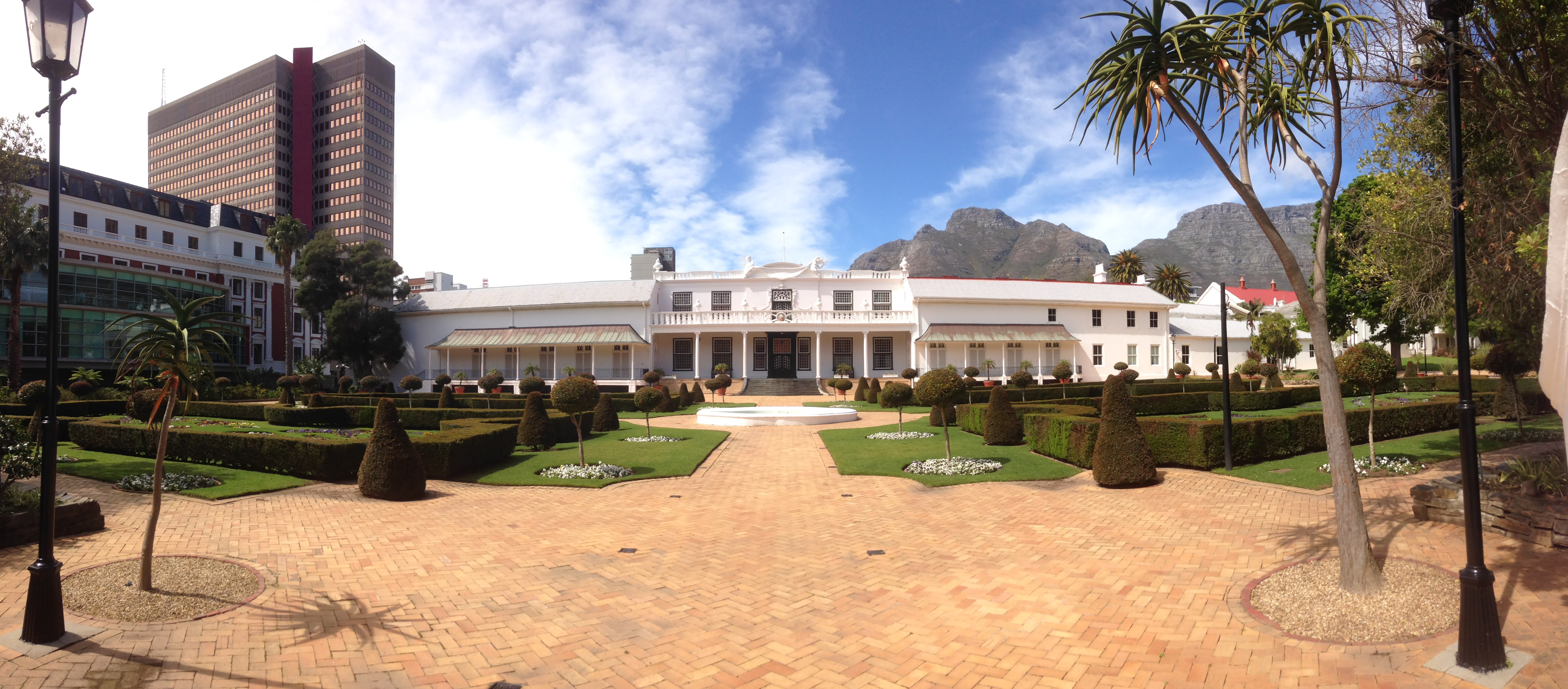
Frontal view of De Tuynhuys from Company Gardens.

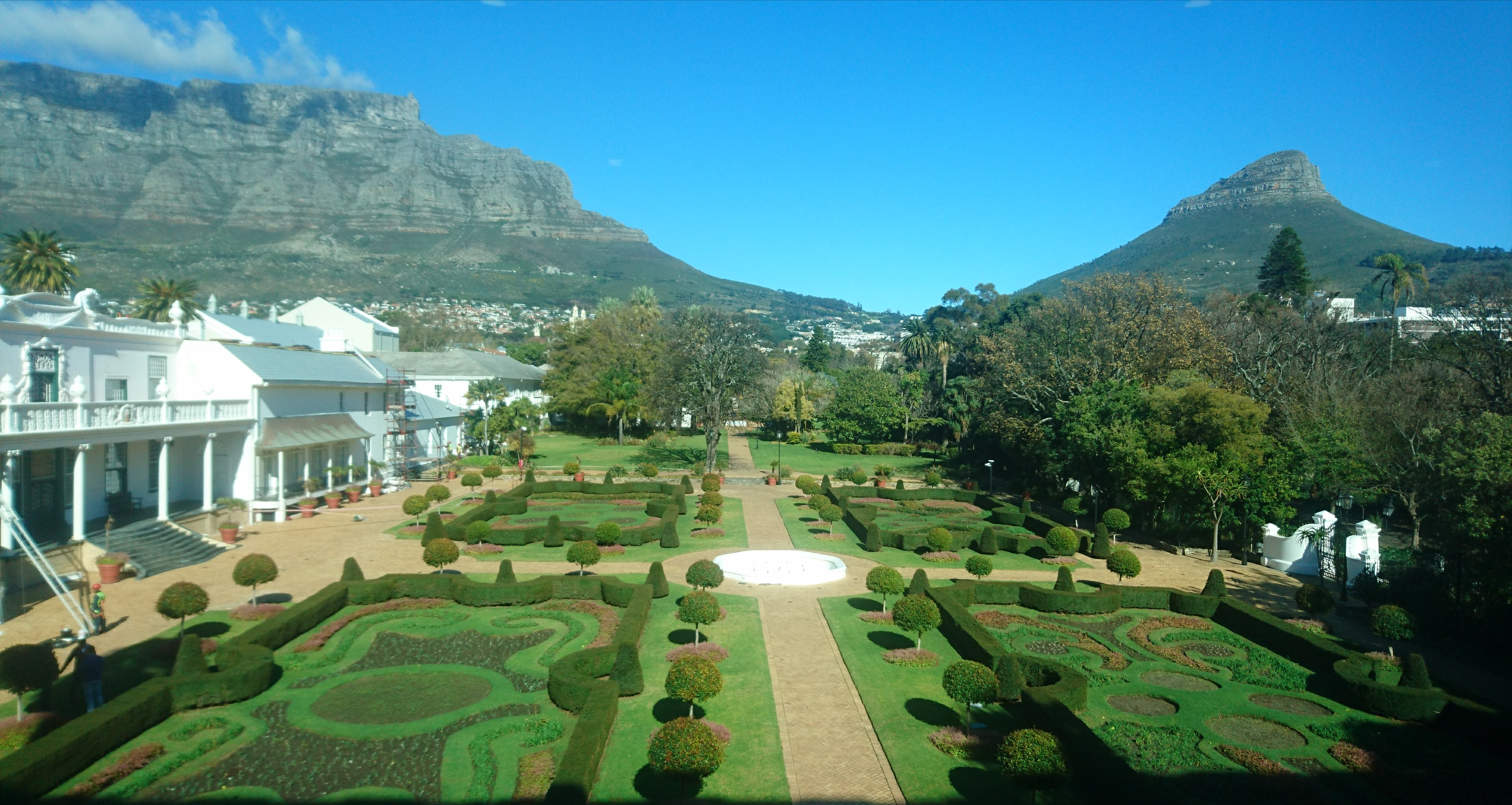
A view of the Tuynhuys from the Parliament buildings next door overlooking the building's gardens.

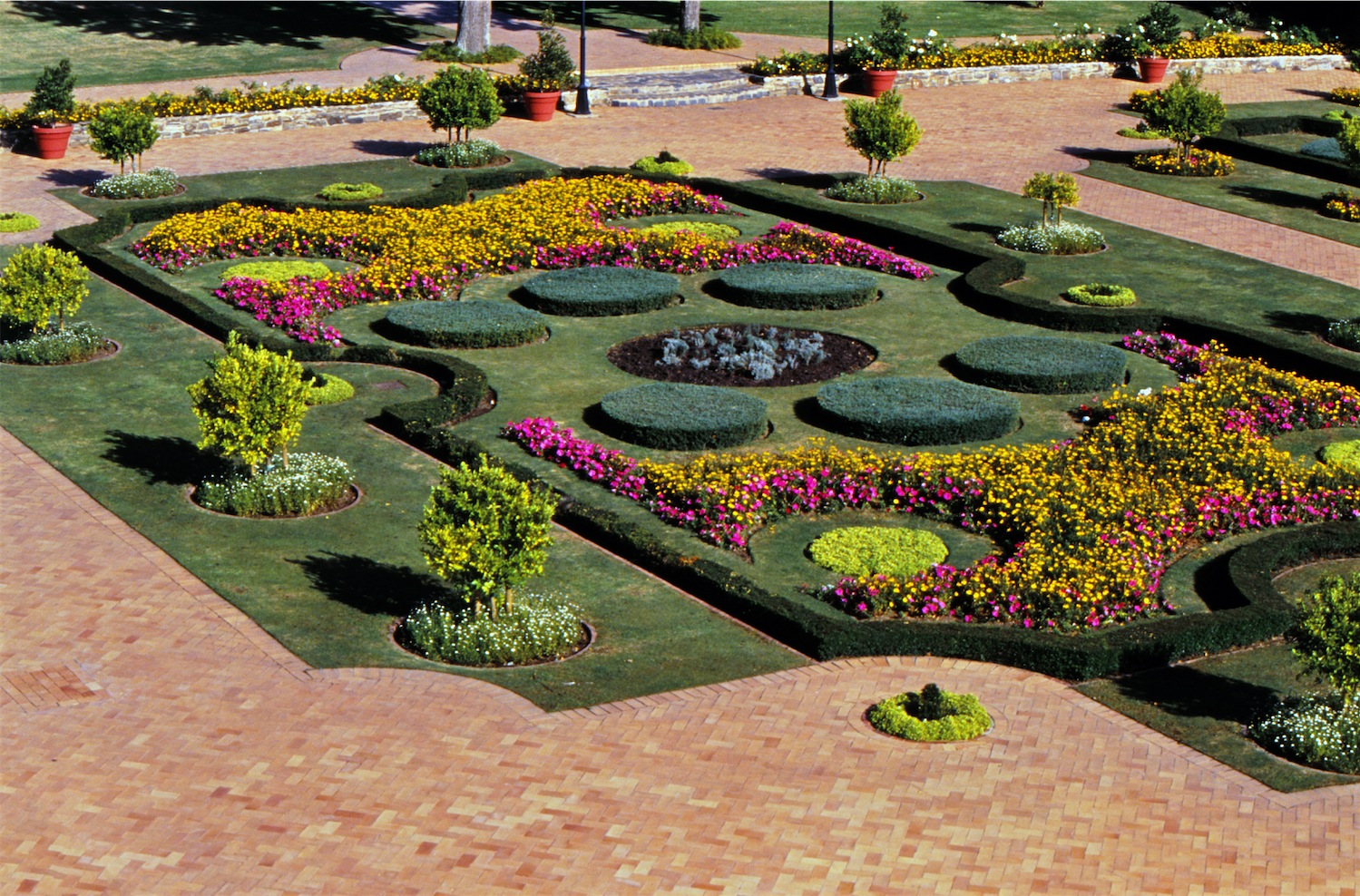
Tuynhuys gardens

De Tuynhuys (lit. 'Garden House') is the office of the president of South Africa, located in Cape Town.

== The building ==
The building has in various guises been associated with the seat of the highest political authority in the land for almost two and a half centuries. The building seemingly had modest beginnings with the earliest known reference to the site being in 1674 when the Dutch East India Company (VOC) first built a "garden house" to store the tools for the company's large garden first established by Jan van Riebeeck in 1652. In about 1682, the toolshed was converted into a guesthouse to entertain foreign visitors of the governor, Simon van der Stel.

The building was renovated and enlarged numerous times until 1751 when it was first recorded that the building was being used as a summer residence by the governor, a custom which the historical record seems to bear out for all the Dutch governors that century. By 1790 the building was known as The Governor's House in the Company's Gardens ('Het Governiurs Huys in de Compagnies Tuyn') and by this time – as reflected in the drawings of Josephus Jones circa 1790 – the gardens side of the building already had its rococo balusters with its stucco drapes and Greco-Roman sculptures.

From a design perspective, the building, incorporating both Louis XVI-style Neo-classicism and Baroque elements, was influenced by 18th century Dutch and Dutch East Indies architecture of the time. Similar façades, windows, doors and fanlights can be seen in colonial buildings built in the same period in places such as Amsterdam and Batavia (modern-day Jakarta).

The plans for the building and the overall design are largely credited to the French architect Louis Michel Thibault (1750–1815) who studied under Louis XVI's architect-in-chief. However, the artistic detail of the outside facades, including the sculptures of the infant Mercury and Poseidon drawn from Greek mythology holding the banner on which the emblem of the VOC was emblazoned, are variously attributed to a sculptor Jacobus Leeuwenberg, a Dutchman and sculptor Anton Anreith (1754–1822), a German, both of whom are known to have worked extensively in the Cape in the last quarter of the 18th century.

Historian Robert C.H. Shell has speculated on the provenance of a not dissimilar front door to be found at Genadendal, previously WestBrook, the president's Cape Town residence, on the Groote Schuur Estate. It is documented that the Genadendal door was bought in the early part of the 20th century from the demolished original farmhouse of the Elsenburg farm in Stellenbosch by Cecil John Rhodes for his estate.

According to Shell the original door might very well have been the work of a slave called Rangton van Bali, who was captured on the island of Bali and sold into slavery in Jakarta to Jacob de Jong, a well known Cape slave trader. He was brought to the Cape where he was in turn sold to Samuel Elsevier, the fiscal of Governor Simon van der Stel, to whom Elsevier was related by marriage.

From what we now know about the role of skilled slaves in the construction of Cape buildings during the late 18th century, and the historical reconstruction of the life and occupations of slaves such as Rangton, it is reasonable to suggest that the original Tuynhuys building, its doors and windows, may very well have been executed by slaves.

After the second British occupation in 1806, the building, now called Government House, underwent a complete change of character. In accordance with the fashion of architectural simplification which swept the Cape at the time, the decorative façade and other baroque adornments from the Dutch period were plastered over and concealed, to create a Georgian-style building typical of the period. Governor Lord Charles Somerset extended the building on both sides to accommodate a ballroom, a magnificent staircase and fireplaces. It is said that he wanted the building to be suitable for a representative of the monarchy. Indeed, in 1947 the British royal family stayed at Government House on their visit to South Africa.

In 1968, Cape Town architect Gabriel Fagan undertook the complex task of restoring the building to its former 18th-century glory. The 1790 drawing by Josephus Jones and another by the French architect Thibault were used by Fagan to recreate the garden façade of the building. The Jones sketch shows a frieze and balustrade of 24m which was built over at the time of Lord Charles Somerset. After careful excavation, it was discovered that the stucco garlands and other floral decorations and relief work, conforming to the Jones drawings, had remained reasonably intact.

The two Greco-Roman sculptures had however not survived. Fagan commissioned Sydney Hunter to recreate the entire balustrade while the wood carvings were executed by the Greek craftsman, Josef Vazirkianzikis. Fagan was mindful of the incremental additions and changes over the centuries, and these he sought to reflect sensitively in the restoration.

Consequently, De Tuynhuys, as it was named in 1972, was restored as authentically as was possible to its 18th-century state, while incorporating the best features of later additions to the building. The result has been a harmonious synthesis.

== History ==
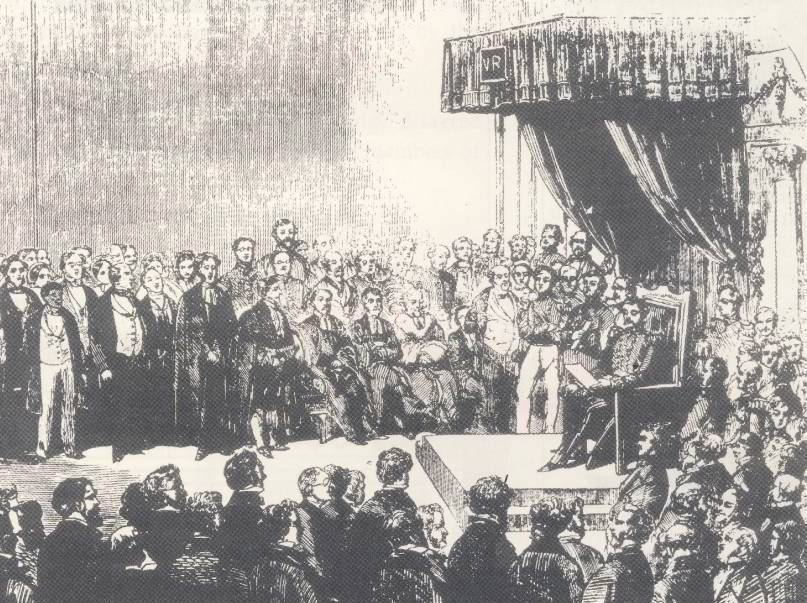
Engraving of the first opening of the Cape Parliament at De Tuynhuys in 1854.

The last state president of the Republic of South Africa, F.W. de Klerk, announced from the building's steps, on 18 March 1992, that South Africa had 'closed the book on apartheid'.

The building was constructed in 1700 by the Dutch East India Company as a residence for important visitors to the Cape, lies between the South African National Parliament buildings and the President's Council in Company's Gardens, Cape Town. It has been used as an official residence by almost all the governors of the Cape – Dutch, Batavian and British – and by state presidents after the country became a Republic in 1961.

Historians have put together a sketch of Tuynhuys's history and, it seems, it began as little more than a tool shed. This was converted into a guesthouse in the year Simon van der Stel became governor in 1679, and by 1710 the guesthouse had already become a double-storey building with a flat roof.

However, there is evidence that Tuynhuys was not always liveable. Lord Charles Somerset, who was responsible for adding a beautiful ballroom and for much of the re-decoration, had to move out of the building in 1824 as it was uninhabitable. Towards the end of the 19th century a debate as to its very existence occurred as authorities considered demolishing it, and a further restoration of the residence took place in 1967.

Tuynhuys was the venue for the opening of the first Cape Parliament by the British governor in 1854.

Today, De Tuynhuys is the office of the president of South Africa.

== See also ==
- Government Houses of South Africa
- Government Houses of the British Empire
- List of Castles and Fortifications in South Africa
