= National Museum, Bloemfontein =

South African Museum

National Museum
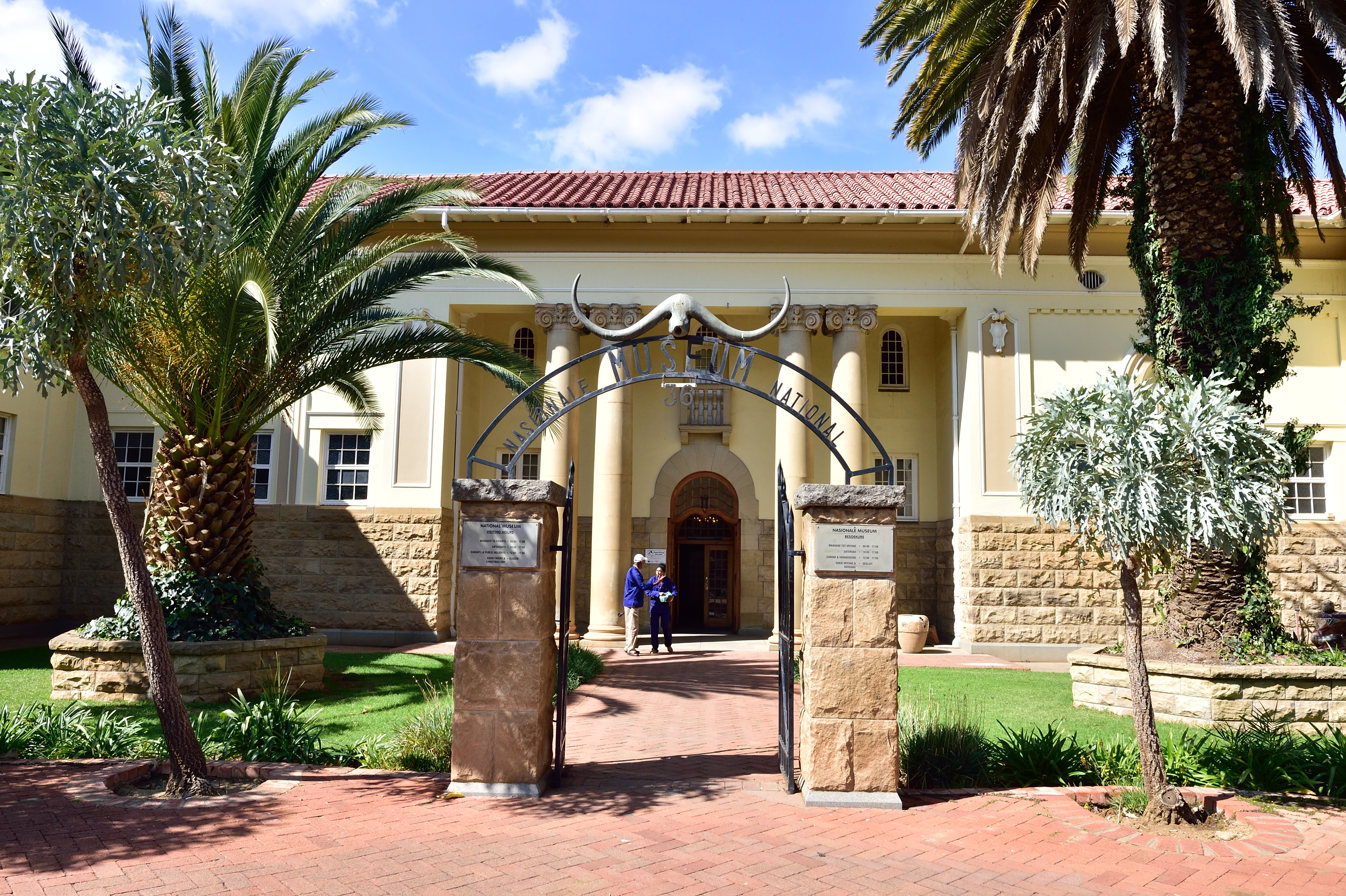
- National Museum, Bloemfontein, Free State, South Africa
- Established: 20 July 1877
- Location: Bloemfontein, South Africa
- Coordinates: 29°06′54″S 26°13′09″E

The First Radsaal

The National Museum in Bloemfontein dates back to the 1870s, when its collections and displays comprised mainly rarities from around the world. It was established on 20 July 1877 and opened to the public on 20 May 1878. The old Raadsaal building was made available by the then Free State Volksraad for hosting the Museum collections. A new museum building was completed in 1913 and the official opening took place in 1915. Since 1881 the museum has been subsidised mainly by government. Through donations, purchases and exchange agreements the Museum's collections slowly got established and grew to a wide variety of natural and human science artefacts.

The first honorary curator was Dr Hugh Exton. The first director, Dr E.C.N. van Hoepen, was appointed in January 1922. Staff numbers increased from six permanent members in 1951 to 130 members in 1985.

Since its founding, the museum has developed a focus on natural history, cultural history, and art. It maintains research programs across these disciplines and houses extensive collections. Through its exhibitions and educational programs, the museum serves the public with displays aimed at diverse audiences.

The Museum currently includes 13 research departments (both Natural Sciences and Human Sciences), an Art Museum, Education Department, Information Services section / Library, an Administration section, and two technical departments.

Satellites to the National Museum are Oliewenhuis Art Museum, Freshford House Museum, The First Raadsaal and Wagon Museum, as well as Florisbad Quaternary Research Station.

On 19 July 1985 Oliewenhuis was handed over to the National Museum to be developed into an art museum. Oliewenhuis was erected in 1941 as residence of the Governor-General of the Union of South Africa. Oliewenhuis Art Museum collects exclusively South African art and its collection consists of paintings, sculpture and graphic art. The pride of the collection is the Pierneef paintings, and the paintings of Bloemfontein done by Thomas Baines in 1851.

Florisbad is an internationally important fossil locality which has produced an archaic modern human skull in addition to valuable archaeological and palaeontological material. In 1912 an earthquake opened up a new spring at the Florisbad mineral spring, and fossil bones and stone artefacts were brought to the surface with the water. In 1932 the well known Florisbad human cranium was discovered. In 1980 Florisbad was bought by the South African Government for research purposes and was placed under the administration of the National Museum, Bloemfontein.

Freshford is one of the few houses of the Edwardian period that still exists in Bloemfontein. The house was designed and built by the architect, John Edwin Harrison. Freshford House was completed in 1897. The house was acquired by the National Museum in 1982, restored to its former glory and was opened in 1986.

The First Raadsaal was built by Maj. H.D. Warden, as a typical South African pioneer's building in 1849. It was the first school building north of the Orange River. It served as a church until 1852 and it was used by the Legislative Council of the Orange River Sovereignty and the Orange Free State Republic as Assembly Hall and offices. When the Assembly moved to larger premises the building reverted to its use as a school, which it remained until 1877. In that year it housed the newly established National Museum. In 1975 the old Raadsaal was once again vacated and transferred to the National Museum.

The Wagon Museum is situated on the same premises as the First Raadsaal Museum. It houses a collection of historical wagons and carriages.
