= Government House, Natal =

The Old Government House in Pietermaritzburg, South Africa, was the official residence of the Lieutenant-Governor of Natal, Sir Benjamin Pine, who arrived in Natal in 1851. The building was completed in the late 1860s. The Natal Government later bought it from Pine and established it as the Government House.

According to a 19th-century visitor: "Driving up to Government House one is struck by its very homely English appearance: in its outward form there has been not striving after giving it the resemblance of a palace: it is after a cottage type, and reminds me of many a vicarage at home."

== See also ==
- Government Houses of South Africa
- Government Houses of the British Empire
