= Adrian Gelb =

Anesthesiologist and academic

Adrian Walter Gelb
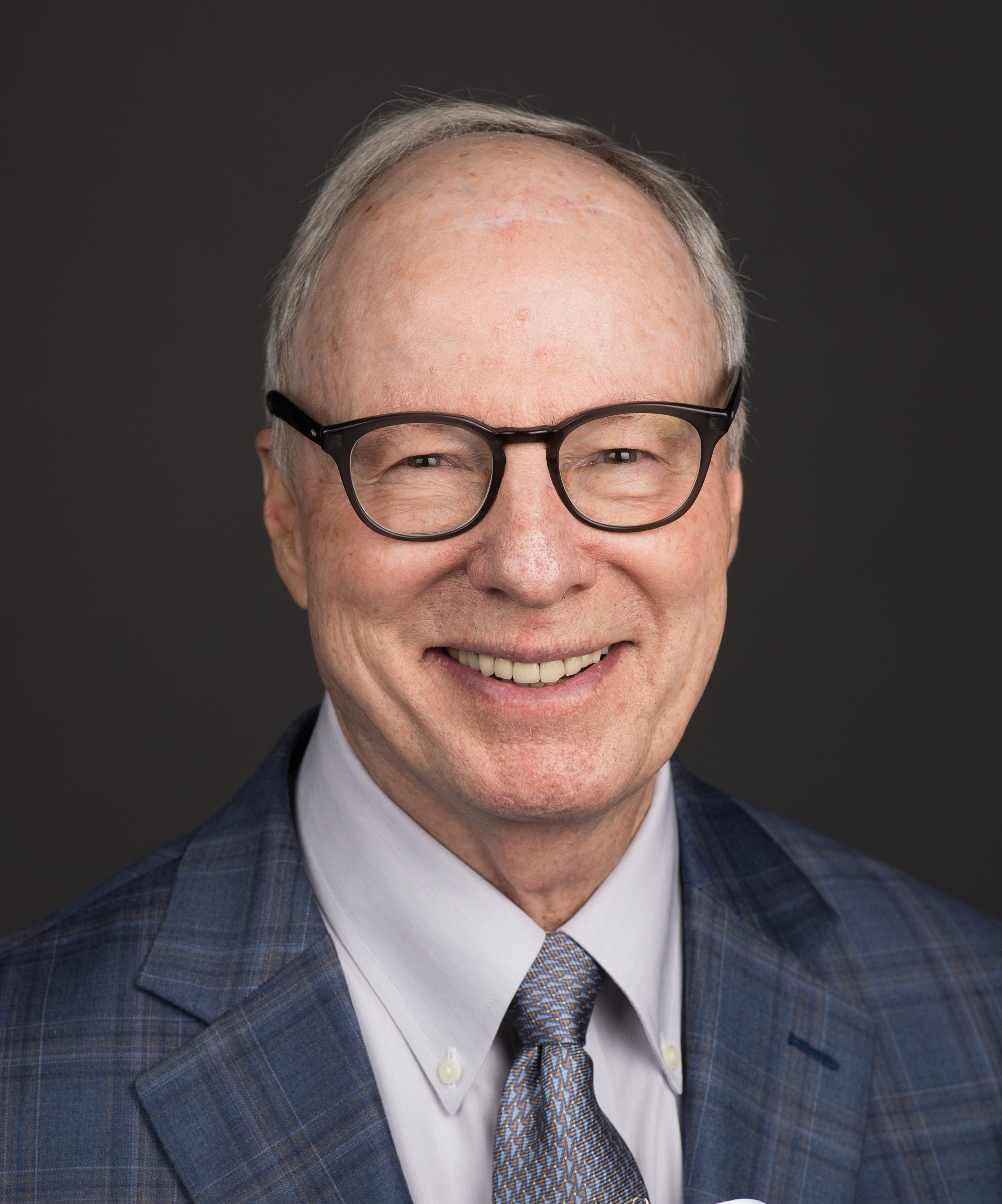
- Occupations: Anesthesiologist, academic, and author

Academic background
- Education: University of Cape Town; University of Toronto

Academic work
- Institutions: University of Western Ontario; University of California, San Francisco

Adrian Walter Gelb is an anesthesiologist, academic, and author. He is a professor emeritus in the Department of Anesthesia and Perioperative Care at the University of California, San Francisco.

Gelb's research has addressed anesthetic pharmacology and anesthetic techniques in relation to neurosurgery and cerebral ischemia, alongside broader work on global health. He received a gold medal for his contributions to anesthesia from the Canadian Anesthesiologists Society in 2018 and the Nicholas Greene MD Humanitarian Award from the American Society of Anesthesiologists in 2024.

Gelb is an elected Fellow of the Royal College of Anaesthetists and was awarded honorary membership to the German Society of Anaesthesiology.

== Education and early career ==
Gelb earned an MBChB from the University of Cape Town in 1972, followed by clinical training in South Africa and the UK. He completed anesthesia residencies at the University of Western Ontario and the University of Toronto in 1977 and 1979, respectively. He received his FRCPC in Anesthesia in 1979 and completed a research fellowship at the Mayo Clinic in 1980.

== Career ==
Gelb began his academic career at the University of Western Ontario, initially as a lecturer. He was appointed assistant professor in 1982, associate professor in 1986, and professor of Anesthesia in 1991, a position he held until 2004. He chaired the Department of Anesthesia and Perioperative Medicine from 1990 to 2001. In 2004, he joined the University of California, San Francisco as a professor and vice chair in the Department of Anesthesia and Perioperative Care, where he was later named professor emeritus.

Gelb worked as an associate scientist at the Robarts Research Institute between 1987 and 1997, while also taking on positions as chief of anesthesia at University Hospital, then at London Health Sciences Centre and St. Joseph's Health Centre.

Gelb was appointed chair of the Patient Safety and Quality Committee of the World Federation of Societies of Anaesthesiologists (WFSA), since when he has worked with the World Health Organization, and helped develop International Standards for a Safe Practice of Anesthesia and an associated checklist, as well as metrics for evaluating surgical services. He has held roles in organizations such as the International Anesthesia Research Society, and the WFSA, where he was elected president from 2020 to 2022.

== Research ==
Gelb's research has focused on neuroanesthesia, neuropharmacology, neurophysiological monitoring, perioperative neurological dysfunction, and global health aspects of perioperative care, including health policy and patient safety. He observed that perioperative stroke after noncardiac, nonneurosurgical surgery occurs more often than expected (0.05–0.7%), mostly embolic and post-anesthesia, not intraoperatively, with higher mortality linked to delayed diagnosis and combined inflammatory effects. He co-developed and validated a contrast-enhanced CT method that measured cerebral blood flow and blood volume, including in brain tumors, where it distinguished tumor tissue from surrounding regions with strong agreement to the microsphere reference method. Moreover, analyzing how loss of consciousness from anesthesia reduces beta-band oscillatory communication between the motor cortex and subcortical motor regions, he highlighted the role of frequency-specific brain interactions in normal motor function.

In a collaborative study, Gelb investigated whether stimulation of the human insular cortex elicits cardiovascular responses and revealed lateralized autonomic control, with right-sided dominance for sympathetic effects. His research evaluated the timing, clinical presentation, and characteristics of postoperative myocardial infarction (PMI) in at-risk patients undergoing noncardiac surgery, finding that PMIs typically occurred within the first two days postoperatively, were often not accompanied by chest pain, and were usually non-Q wave in nature.

In neuroanesthesia, Gelb studied the interaction of anesthetic agents and cerebral ischemia, the use of evoked potential monitoring, and the influence of GABAergic agents on neurological examination in patients with supratentorial tumors, as well as the reversibility of midazolam effects.

== Awards and honors ==
- 2001 – Elected Fellow, Royal College of Anaesthetists, UK
- 2009 – Special Award for Contributions to the Development of Anesthesia in China, Chinese Society Anesthesia
- 2010 – Distinguished Service Award, Society for Neuroscience in Anesthesia and Critical Care (SNACC)
- 2016 – Honorary Membership, Czech Society of Anesthesia, Intensive Care, and Resuscitation
- 2018 – Gold Medal, Canadian Anesthesiologists Society
- 2020 – Honorary Membership, German Society of Anaesthesiology
- 2024 – Nicholas Greene MD Humanitarian Award, American Society of Anesthesiologists
- 2025 – Honorary Membership, Romanian Society of Anaesthesia and Intensive Care

== Bibliography ==
=== Selected books ===
- Sharpe, Michael D.; Gelb, Adrian W. (1999). Anesthesia and Transplantation (1st ed.). Butterworth-Heinemann. ISBN 978-0-7506-9664-7.
- Gupta, Arun K.; Gelb, Adrian W.; Duane, Derek; Adapa, Ram (2018). Essentials of Neuroanesthesia and Neurointensive Care (2nd ed.). Cambridge University Press. ISBN 978-1-316-60252-2.

=== Selected articles ===
- Badner, Neal H.; Nielson, Warren R.; Munk, Shirley; Kwiatkowska, Caroline; Gelb, Adrian W. (1990). "Preoperative anxiety: detection and contributing factors". Canadian Journal of Anaesthesia. 37 (4): 444–447. doi:10.1007/BF03005624. PMID 2340614.
- Oppenheimer, Stephen M.; Gelb, Adrian; Girvin, John P.; Hachinski, Vladimir C. (1992). "Cardiovascular effects of human insular cortex stimulation". Neurology. 42 (9): 1727–1732. doi:10.1212/WNL.42.9.1727. PMID 1513461.
- Badner, Neal H.; Knill, Richard L.; Brown, James E.; Novick, Theodore V.; Gelb, Adrian W. (1998). "Myocardial infarction after noncardiac surgery". Anesthesiology. 88 (3): 572–578. doi:10.1097/00000542-199803000-00005. PMID 9523798.
- Cenic, Aleksa; Nabavi, Darius G.; Craen, Rosemary A.; Gelb, Adrian W.; Lee, Ting-Yim (1999). "Dynamic CT Measurement of Cerebral Blood Flow: A Validation Study". American Journal of Neuroradiology. 20 (1): 63–73. PMID 9974059.
- Cenic, Aleksa; Nabavi, Darius G.; Craen, Rosemary A.; Gelb, Adrian W.; Lee, Ting-Yim (2000). "A CT Method to Measure Hemodynamics in Brain Tumors: Validation and Application of Cerebral Blood Flow Maps". American Journal of Neuroradiology. 21 (3): 462–470. PMC 8174983. PMID 10730636.
- Farmer, Jaycee R.; Sutherland, Jason M.; Field, Thalia S.; McIsaac, Daniel I.; Gelb, Adrian W.; Zhou, Lily W.; Sun, Terri; Schwarz, Stephan K.W.; Flexman, Alana M. (2025). "Outcomes Following Perioperative Stroke in Cardiac Surgery Patients: A Retrospective Cohort Study". Journal of Cardiothoracic and Vascular Anesthesia. doi:10.1053/j.jvca.2025.04.010. PMID 40320349.
