= Government House, Pretoria =

Government House of Pretoria
- Regeringshuis van Pretoria
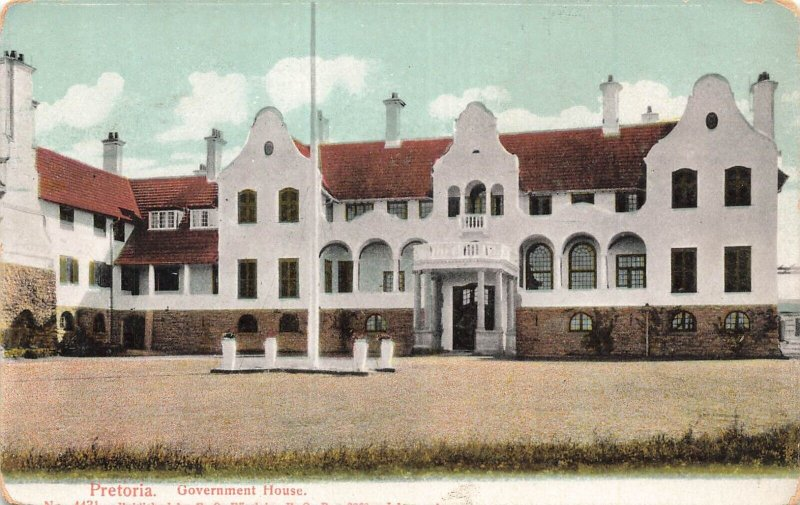
- The front entrance of the building

General information
- Architectural style: Cape Vernacular Style
- Location: Pretoria, South Africa, 970 Stanza Bopape Road, Pretoria, South Africa
- Construction started: 1902
- Construction stopped: 1906
- Opened: 1906
- Owner: South African Government

Design and construction
- Architect: Herbert Baker

Government House was built between 1902 and 1906 as the official residence of the governor of the Transvaal Colony. It was designed by Herbert Baker.

The Cape vernacular style was taken on as a national building style promoted not only by the Cape coteries but also by proponents of Dutch-speaking republican independence or of Afrikaner nationalism, notably the Dutch Pretoria artist Jacobus Hendrik Pierneef. Over the next few decades most public buildings in South Africa were designed with versions of Cape Dutch gables, with fanlights, mullioned windows, and brass escutcheons, to differing degrees of cost and credibility. William Palmer, 2nd Earl of Selborne would have stayed here as he was the governor of Transvaal.

== See also ==
- Government Houses of South Africa
- Government Houses of the British Empire
- Governors General of South Africa
