= Government House, Orange Free State =

National Museum
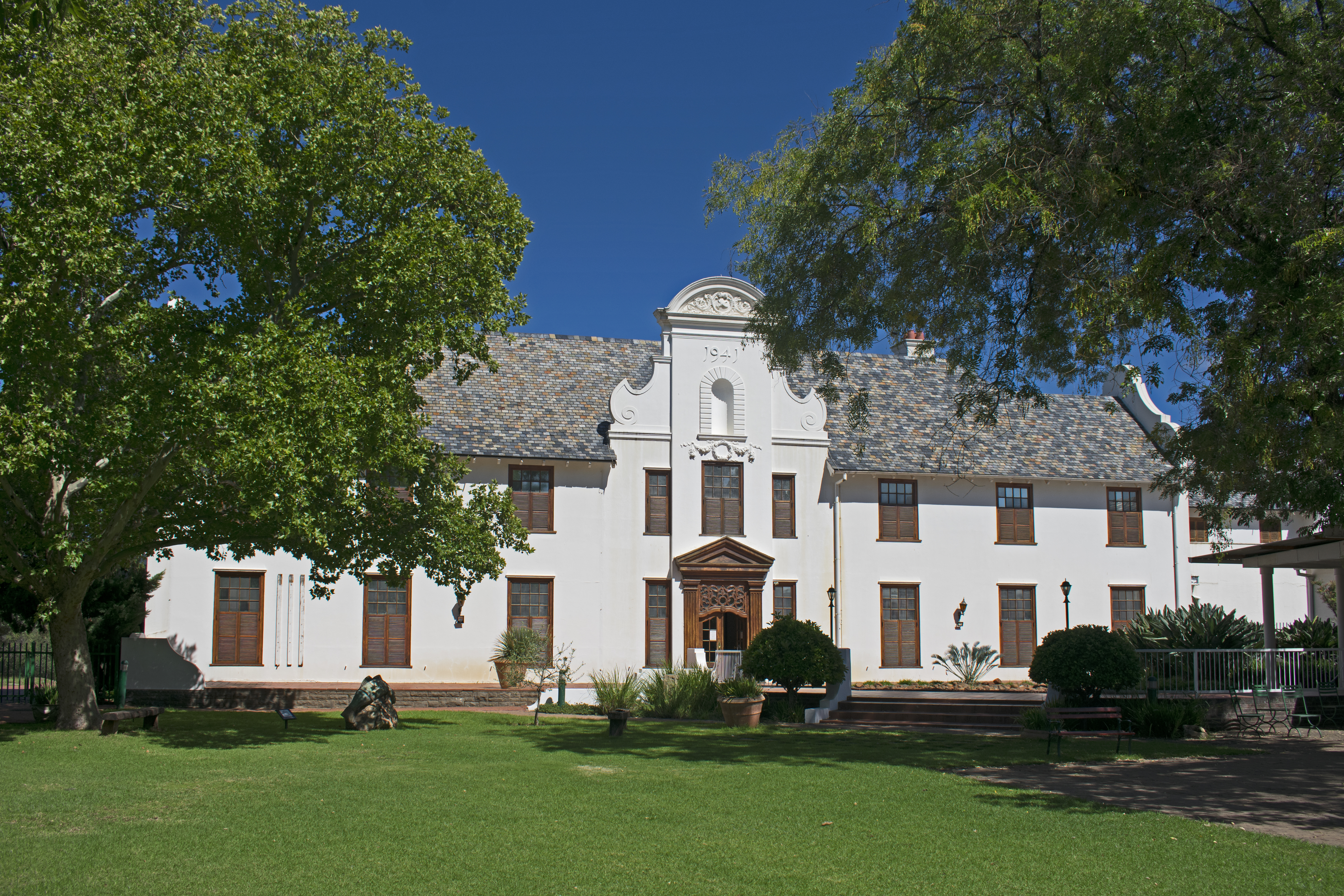
- The main building seen from the east
- Location: Bloemfontein, South Africa
- Coordinates: 29.1151°S 26.2191°E
- Website: www.nasmus.co.za

A Neo-Dutch style mansion in Bloemfontein was designed in 1935. Completed in 1941, this mansion located on Grant's Hill served as residence for the Governor General of the Union of South Africa from 1942.

In 1972, the building was officially named Oliewenhuis, the name derived from the abundance of wild olive trees growing on the hills nearby. In 1985 the building became an art museum.

== See also ==
- Government Houses of South Africa
- Government Houses of the British Empire
