= Herschel Girls' School =

School in Western Cape, South Africa

Herschel Girls School
- Herschel Girls School logo

Location
- 21 Herschel Road, Claremont; Cape Town, Western Cape; South Africa; 33°59′15″S 18°27′59″E

Information
- School type: Day school All-girls independent school
- Motto: Latin: Ad Dei Gloriam ("To the Glory of God")
- Religious affiliation: Anglican
- Established: 16 February 1922; 104 years ago
- Locale: Suburban
- School district: District 9
- School number: 021 650 7500
- Head of School: Mrs Heather Goedeke
- Staff: 150 full-time
- Grades: 000–12
- Gender: Female
- Age: 4 to 18
- Enrollment: 1045 girls
- Language: English
- Schedule: 08:00 - 15:00
- Campus: Herschel Girls School
- Campus type: Suburban
- Houses: Carter, Jagger, Merriman and Rolt
- Colours: Blue; Beige; Pink
- Sports: Basketball, Cross Country, Hockey, Netball, Squash, Swimming, Tennis, Water Polo
- Nickname: Herschel
- School fees: R80 000 - R180 000 (tuition)
- Alumni: HAU
- Website: www.herschel.org.za

Herschel Girls School is a private day school for girls, located in Claremont, a southern suburb of Cape Town, Western Cape, South Africa. The school has pre-nursery through to grade 12 and is affiliated with the Anglican church, which owns the school buildings.

Herschel Girls School is an independent Anglican girls’ school in Cape Town, South Africa. The school has been described as “one of the country's best-known schools for girls”.[1] In 2019, it achieved the highest academic results in the country in the National Senior Certificate examinations.[2] Effective 1 January 2022, Herschel adopted the Independent Examinations Board (IEB) as its assessment body for the National Senior Certificate qualification.[3] The school’s stated purpose is to provide an empowering education for girls and to advance girls’ education and advocacy for women in South Africa. There are waiting lists for every grade, including pre-nursery.

== Notable alumnae ==
- Alide Dasnois, journalist and newspaper editor
- Margaret Elsworth, founder of the African Scholars' Fund and the African Scholars' Fund UK
- Sue MacGregor, BBC Radio 4 broadcaster
- Diana E. H. Russell, feminist scholar and activist
- Pauline Vogelpoel, arts administrator
- Zoe Beyers, BBC Philharmonic concertmaster
- Kayla de Waal, South African field hockey player
- Professor Sarah Howie, Founding Director at the Centre for Capacity Development in Africa
