= Clotilde Mukamurera =

Rwandan judge

Clotilde Mukamurera is a Rwandan judge currently serving as the president of the High Court of Commerce of Rwanda. Appointed by president Paul Kagame and confirmed by the Senate on 28 April 2021, she succeeded Emanuel Kamere.

== Education and career ==
Clotilde Mukamurera holds a master's degree in business law from University of Cape Town, South Africa and trained in arbitration, banking, procurement, leasing and intellectual property. Mukamurera started her judicial career as a judge at Gisenyi Intermediate Court in 2000 and was later appointed vice president of the Rusizi Intermediate Court. She served as a member of the High Council of the Judiciary of Rwanda from 2008 to 2015 when she was elected a judge to the Court of Justice of the Common Market for Eastern and Southern Africa (Comesa). She received 13 out of 15 votes cast in the election.
