= Wanga Zembe-Mkabile =

South African social policy researcher

- Education: University of Cape Town (BSocSc) Oxford University (PhD)
- Scientific career
- Fields: Sociology; Social policy
- Workplaces: South African Medical Research Council
- Thesis: Good but not good enough: the limitations of a social assistance program for children in South Africa—the case of the child support grant (2013)
- Doctoral advisor: Rebecca Surrender; Michael Noble

Wanga Zembe-Mkabile is a South African social policy researcher at the South African Medical Research Council, specializing in tracking food insecurity. She is known for working to develop research methods cooperatively with local communities.

== Education ==
Zembe-Mkabile earned her Bachelor of Social Science from the University of Cape Town. She has expressed support for younger scientists and students' activism for decolonization. As part of the first generation of black South Africans able to enter higher education and research, she has stated that she and her peers "entered these spaces and you were so grateful to be there that you didn't question anything. At least now, students are alert." Zembe-Mkabile was awarded her PhD in 2013 by the Oxford University Department of Social Policy and Intervention (within Green Templeton College). She has spoken about the discomfort and invasiveness of some part of her research on food security, and the difficulty of negotiating power dynamics between student researchers doing field work and their mentors who may not appreciate the sensitivity of research topics. In particular, she has advocated for community-aware and -involved research methods, stating that "Some questions are not worth exploring if they are going to trample on people's dignity."

== Career ==
Zembe-Mkabile is a specialist scientist at the South African Medical Research Council's Health Systems Research Unit. She has analyzed the experience of government grant recipients qualitatively on an individual level, capturing details that quantitative research misses. Furthermore, her work has shown that current grants and welfare efforts are inadequate in providing for children's basic nutritional needs. Zembe-Mkabile's advocacy for respecting the dignity and humanity of human-subjects research on those in poverty was the inspiration for the first title of the University of South Africa's African Psychologies colloquium series, "Centering Africa in Health and Social Sciences Research and Teaching" colloquium, where she also presented.

In addition to her research, Zembe-Mkabile is also an advocate in the lay press for more effective social grants, in particular during the COVID-19 pandemic. Her recent work has focused on the effects of COVID-19 on food security for families in poverty or who lost work as a result of lockdowns in the Langa township of Cape Town, documenting how existing government measures have provided only inconsistent support for many parents and caregivers.
