= Mervyn Maze =

Mervyn Maze, MD, MB ChB has been a Professor in the Departments of Anesthesia and Pain Medicine, Intensive Care at the University of California, San Francisco since 1988. He has also served as Professor and Chair at Imperial College London.

== Biography ==
Maze was born in Cape Town, South Africa, where he earned a Bachelor of Medicine and Bachelor of Surgery from the University of Cape Town, South Africa, in 1970. His research and discoveries have resulted in 16 patents including a series of discoveries linked to Neuroprotection. Maze recently published a study in JAMA relating to the effects of inhaled xenon on cerebral white matter damage in Cardiac patients. He has written over 200 scientific articles, contributed several chapters to other medical publications, and edited three different medical textbooks. He is a member of the SmartTots Scientific Advisory Board, which is "a multi-year collaborative effort designed to increase the safety of anesthetic and sedative drugs for the millions of children who undergo anesthesia and sedation each year."

== Awards and honors ==
Maze was awarded the Excellence in Research Award from the American Society of Anesthesiologists in 2003. He has also been awarded an Honorary Lifetime Membership in Israel Society of for contributions to Anesthesiology in Israel, 2012.
