= Cecil Helman =

South African medical anthropologist (1944–2009)

Cecil Helman (4 January 1944 – 15 June 2009) was a South African doctor, author, and medical anthropologist. He published poetry, essays, and short stories, as well as academic books and papers.

== Early life and education ==
Helman was the son of a doctor in Cape Town, South Africa. His father was a psychiatrist for the South African government who would often take Helman to mental hospitals during summer breaks from school. He graduated from the University of Cape Town Medical School (1967). During the civil unrest as a result of apartheid in South Africa, Helman was disturbed by the idea of being conscripted into the South African army. Shortly after completing medical school he moved to Great Britain, where he studied social anthropology at University College London.

== Professional life ==
From 1973 till 2000, Helman was a family doctor in London, working for the National Health Service. Helman was also Professor of Medical Anthropology at Brunel University, Uxbridge, England; and a senior lecturer in the Research Department of Primary Care & Population Health, University College London Medical School, where he taught courses on cross-cultural health care. He was a visiting fellow in social medicine and health policy at Harvard Medical School (1983); Hooker Distinguished Visiting Professor in the Department of Anthropology, McMaster University, Hamilton, Ontario, Canada (1991); visiting professor in the Multicultural Health Program, University of New South Wales, Sydney, Australia (2001); and visiting professor in the Division of Family Medicine and Public Health & the Department of Social Anthropology, University of Cape Town, South Africa (2007).

== Publications ==
Helman's writings focus on patients' personal narratives and experience of ill-health and suffering, as well as the roles played in medical care by social and cultural factors. Suburban Shaman, his 2006 memoir of medical school in apartheid South Africa, ship's doctoring in the Mediterranean, family practice in London, and visits to traditional healers in different countries, was serialized by BBC Radio 4 as its 'Book of the Week' in March 2006. His textbook Culture, Health and Illness, first published in 1984, has been used in many countries. In his academic capacity, he also wrote articles in medical journals.

His books include:

- Medical Anthropology (Editor) (ISBN 978-0-7546-2655-8) (2008)
- Culture, Health and Illness (5th ed) (ISBN 978-0-340-91450-2)m(2007)
- Suburban Shaman: Tales from Medicine's Frontline (ISBN 1-905-14008-8) (2006)
- Doctors and Patients: An Anthology (Editor) (ISBN 1-857-75993-1) (2003)
- Irregular Numbers of Beasts and Birds (ISBN 0-9744503-5-9) (2006)
- The Other Half of the Dream (0-9744503-1-6) (2004)
- The Body of Frankenstein's Monster: Essays in Myth and Medicine (ISBN 0-393-03104-7) (1992)
- Body Myths (ISBN 978-0-7011-3833-2) (1991)
- The Golden Toenails of Ambrosio P (ISBN 0 947757 33 3) (1990)
- The Exploding Newspaper and other Fables (ISBN 0-903400-51-0) (1980)

== Honors ==
Career Achievement Award, Society for Medical Anthropology, American Anthropological Association (2004) Lucy Mair Medal for Applied Anthropology from the Royal Anthropological Institute of Great Britain (2005) George Abercrombie Award from the Royal College of General Practitioners (2009) Medical Journalists' Association 2007 Book of the Year Award for Suburban Shaman (2007)

Helman has also delivered the David Rogers Colloquium on Health Policy at the Weill Medical College of Cornell University (2005); the Astrid Janzon Memorial Lecture at the Red Cross University College of Nursing, Stockholm, Sweden (2006); and the Cabot Lecture in the Division of Primary Care, Harvard Medical School, Boston (2007).
