= Pauline Vogelpoel =

Pauline Vogelpoel, MBE
- Born: 24 April 1926; Lourenço Marques, Portuguese East Africa (now Maputo, Mozambique)
- Died: 22 December 2002 (aged 76); Basel, Switzerland
- Occupation: Arts administrator

Pauline Vogelpoel MBE (24 April 1926 – 22 December 2002) was a South African arts administrator.

== Early life and education ==
Pauline Vogelpoel was educated at both Herschel Girls' School and Rustenburg Girls' School in Cape Town. She received a degree in Fine Art from the University of Cape Town's Michaelis School of Fine Art.

She became engaged to a Rhodesian, Buster St Quintin, an aide to the Prime Minister Godfrey Huggins.

== Career ==
In 1950, Vogelpoel followed her brother Louis, a cardiologist and a world expert on wild flowers, to London. Beatrice Janice introduced her to the Art Institute of Chicago and got her a job in New York helping Douglas McCaigie of the Museum of Modern Art.

She joined the Contemporary Art Society as organising secretary in 1954, becoming director in 1976.

In 1982, left her job at the Contemporary Art Society to move to Switzerland with her husband, a banker, who had got a job there. She became the Zürich editor of Harpers and Queen magazine.

In 1997, Vogelpoel joined the International Council of the Tate Gallery.

She recorded her memories for the National Sound Archive's Artists' Lives project at the British Library Sound Archive.

== Honours ==
Vogelpoel received an MBE in 1962.

== Personal life and death ==
In 1975, Vogelpoel married David Mann, a banker.

She died of a brain tumour in Basel on 22 December 2002, aged 76.
