= Margaret Elsworth =

- Born: 5 December 1929; East Grinstead, Sussex, England
- Died: 6 October 2023 (aged 93); Rondebosch, Cape Town, South Africa
- Occupation: Director of the African Scholars' fund
- Spouse: Jack Elsworth
- Children: Christopher, Barbara, Sandy (Andrew), David and Elizabeth

Dr Margaret Elsworth MBE (5 December 1929 – 6 October 2023) was the founder of the African Scholars' Fund and the African Scholars' Fund UK.

Elsworth was educated at Micklefield and Herschel Girls School. She graduated in 1954 from the University of Cape Town with a MBChB. As a student she helped her father, Sandy Blagden, establish CAFDA, an organisation that raised funds for the development of poor communities living on the Cape Flats by selling second hand books. CAFDA bookshops still flourish today. During those years she also a co-founder of SHAWCO.

After years of working at the Red Cross Hospital she realised the priority of education in helping families rise above their impoverished conditions, and began recycling school textbooks from privileged white schools to poor black schools. In 1970 she founded the African Scholar's Fund which provided a grant to black high school learners in South Africa, and later TECSAT (Technical College Student Aid Trust Western Cape). She worked as a medical officer for the Janet Bourhill Institute from 1961 to 1994.

In 1987 she was awarded an honorary Master of Social Sciences from the University of Cape Town. In 1996 she was awarded an MBE from Queen Elizabeth II for her work for charity. She was elected to the Order of Simon of Cyrene in 2010. Her husband, Dr Jack Elsworth, died in 2003.

== Sources ==
- "Paul Harris Award". Archived from the original on September 28, 2007.
- African Scholar's Fund Homepage
- "St Paul's Newsletter" (PDF). Archived from the original (PDF) on September 28, 2007.
- Elsworth's ashes in Newlands Forest
- "Dr Margaret Elsworth at Who's Who". Archived from the original on September 27, 2007.
- Mtyala, Q. 2003. 'Scientists lectures kept hundreds rapt'. Cape Argus.
