= German Society of Anaesthesiology and Intensive Care Medicine =

The German Society of Anaesthesiology and Intensive Care Medicine (German: Deutsche Gesellschaft für Anästhesiologie und Intensivmedizin) is a medical association with more than 15,000 members. It was established as the German Society of Anesthesia on 10 April 1953 at the 70th annual congress of the German Society of Surgery in Munich. The founding president of the German Working Group of Anesthesiology and the German Society of Anaesthesiology from 1952 to 1953 was Richard Heinz-Joachim Park (1918–1963). The Society's registered office is located in Heidelberg, and the office is in Nuremberg.
