= Louis Vogelpoel =

- Born: 26 March 1922; Lourenço Marques, Portuguese East Africa (Maputo, Mozambique)
- Died: 28 April 2005 (aged 83); Cape Town, South Africa
- Occupations: general physician, cardiologist and horticultural scientist
- Spouse: Daphne
- Children: Peter, Lynda-Jane, David and Christopher
- Parent(s): Pieter and Yvonne Vogelpoel

Louis Vogelpoel (26 March 1922 in Lourenço Marques, Portuguese East Africa – 28 April 2005 in Cape Town, South Africa) was a South African general physician, cardiologist and horticultural scientist. He was a "world expert on wild flowers with an orchid named after him". His sister was Pauline Vogelpoel.

Louis graduated from the University of Cape Town in 1945 with first class honours and a prize for the best student of that year. He was awarded the C J Adams and Nuffield dominion fellowships, which allowed him to spend two years at the National Heart Hospital in London] in the early fifties, where he developed his lifelong interest and expertise in cardiology. He married in 1951. He trained under Paul Wood. He returned to Cape Town in 1953 and was appointed as a part-time physician and lecturer in the department of medicine and cardiac clinic at the University of Cape Town and Groote Schuur Hospital. He was one of the founding members of the Cardiac Clinic at Groote Schuur Hospital and University of Cape Town.

His clinical research activities resulted in the award of an MD with first class honours in 1959 and the publication of many papers, some of which are still quoted. Many of his earlier contributions reflected truly original observations when modern cardiology was in its infancy. Some of these have stood the test of time and have been 'rediscovered' years later with the development of more sophisticated techniques.

He was well-recognised as a horticultural scholar and researcher. His interest was mainly indigenous South African flora and he was generally regarded as an expert on ericas and South African orchids, particularly the genus Disa. He had a vast knowledge of the natural habitat and spent many hours in the veld. His studies and research on the biorhythms of the disa orchid species allowed the successful cultivation of these beautiful orchids in nurseries. These contributions were recorded in excellent articles and chapters in the orchid literature. Following his first publication on disa uniflora in 1980 more than 45 publications followed on various aspects of orchids. His writings showed clear thought and meticulous attention to detail, while he was also an expert photographer of orchids and other flowers and published on that subject.

He was a long-time member of the Cape Orchid Society and was a founder member of the Disa Orchid Society of South Africa in 1982. He was the director of the SA Orchid Council from 1989-1993 and its Gold Medal recipient in 2002. The orchid disa vogelpoelii was named after him.

The Louis Vogelpoel Travelling Scholarship is awarded in his honour annually which offers an amount of up to R15 000 towards the travel and accommodation costs of a local or international congress by the Cape Western branch of the South African Heart Association in memory of one of South Africa’s outstanding cardiologists, Dr Louis Vogelpoel.
