= Robert Carl-Heinz Shell =

South African author and scholar

- Born: 13 February 1949
- Died: 3 February 2015 (aged 66)
- Education: University of Cape Town; University of Rochester; Yale University
- Scientific career
- Thesis: "Slavery at the Cape of Good Hope, 1680–1731"

Robert Carl-Heinz Shell (31 January 1949 – 3 February 2015) was a South African author, scholar, and professor of African Studies. He was born in the Cape Province of South Africa and lived in the United States in the 1980s and 1990s. After the fall of apartheid he returned to South Africa. Toward the end of his life he lived in the Western Cape with his wife Sandy Rowoldt Shell, who is the head of the African Studies Library at University of Cape Town.

Professor Shell delivered papers on several topics but notably on slavery, Islam and HIV/AIDS. In September 2004, he delivered the keynote address at the AGM of SANTA (SA National Tuberculosis Association) in Port Elizabeth, South Africa with a talk entitled "Infectious diseases in South Africa: HIV/AIDS and TB, some statistical trends". He has also appeared in Washington, D.C., where he addressed both the House Select Committee on African affairs and the House Select Committee on International Relations on the global Aids pandemic.

== Education ==
Professor Shell obtained his undergraduate and Honours degrees at University of Cape Town in the 1970s. He then went to the U.S. to complete his master's degree at University of Rochester and in 1986 he completed his PhD at Yale University. For his doctoral studies at Yale, completed in 1986, Shell wrote the dissertation entitled "Slavery at the Cape of Good Hope, 1680–1731" under the advisership of famed South African historian, Leonard M. Thompson.

== Teaching positions ==
2006–2007: Extraordinary Professor of Historical demography in the UWC Statistics Department.
2001–2005: UWC Associate Professor of Statistics
1996–2001: Rhodes University, East London Division, Senior Lecturer
1988–95: Princeton University History Department, Assistant Professor of African History
1988: Oswego, SUNY, Visiting Professor of African History
1986/87: University of California, Santa Barbara: Visiting Lecturer, African History
1983/84: Yale University Teaching Fellowship for expository writing; colonial America
1981: Yale University: South African History (assistant for Prof L M Thompson)
1976/77: East Asian Economic and Demographic History (Prof. Robert Hall)

== Professional Positions ==
2003–: Nelson Mandela Chair of African Studies, Jawaharlal Nehru University, New Delhi (6 months)
2003–: Vice President, Demographic Association of Southern Africa (DEMSA)
2001–: Assoc. Prof of Statistics, University of Western Cape
1998–1999: Councillor of Demographic Association of South Africa (DEMSA)
1997–2000: Director of Population Research Unit, Rhodes University (EL)
1996: Lecturer-in-charge: History Department, Rhodes University (EL)
1989–93: Director of African Studies, Princeton University
1991/2: Executive Secretary, Shelby Cullom Davis Center, Princeton University
1989/90: Committee member on Academic Initiatives on South Africa
1989/90: Committee member on Southern Colonialist Search
1989/90: Executive Committee Member, Shelby Cullom Davis Center

== Publications ==
=== Books ===
- De Meillon's people of colour : some notes on their dress and occupations with special reference to Cape views and costumes (1978)
- Cape slave trade, 1680 to 1731: Towards a census (1983)
- Religious conversion in 19th and early 20th century South Africa : some notes on the Horton thesis (1985)
- Slavery at the Cape of Good Hope, 1680–1731 (1986)
- Children of Bondage: A Social History of the Slave Society at the Cape of Good Hope, 1652–1813 (1994)
- Agony of Asar: A Thesis on Slavery by the Former Slave, Jacobus Eliza Johannes 1717–1747
- From diaspora to diorama : African slave trade routes and Southern Africa : the UNESCO Slave Trade Route Project (SA chapter) feasibility study. (1999)
- From Diaspora to Diorama : The Slave Lodge (2008)
- Changing Hands : A Calendar of Bondage (2008)

=== Articles ===
- Shell, Robert Carl-Heinz. "Islam in southern Africa, 1652–1998." History of Islam in Africa. (2000): 327–348.
- Shell, Robert Carl-Heinz. "Between Christ and Mohammed : conversion, slavery, and gender in the urban Western Cape." Christianity in South Africa: political, social, and cultural history. (1997): 268–277.
- Shell, Robert Carl-Heinz. Hudson's descriptions of "Auctions – their good and evil tendency"’ in Quarterly Bulletin of the South African Library 39:4 June 1985 pp147-151 and 40:1 September 1985 pp 12–18, of 'SE Hudson on funerals' in Quarterly Bulletin of the South African Library 44:2 Dec 1989, pp56–63.
- Shell, Robert Carl-Heinz. 'Hudson’s Cape Town' in Quarterly Bulletin of the South African Library 47:4 June 1993 pp133–149.
- Shell, Robert Carl-Heinz. AIDS in the poorest province of South Africa, 1988 to 2001 UWC Aids mini conference proceedings – Nov 2001
- Shell, Robert Carl-Heinz. "POSITIVE OUTCOMES: The chances of acquiring HIV/AIDS during the school-going years in the Eastern Cape, 1990–2000"
- Shell, Robert Carl-Heinz.A second generation HIV/Aids surveillance protocol based on unlinked anonymized testing of trauma patients at selected hospitals in Southern Africa.
- Shell, Robert Carl-Heinz. How to write a research proposal for peer review

=== Reviews ===
- Blacks in the Dutch World: The Evolution of Racial Imagery in Modern Society by Allison Blakely—Review author[s]: Robert Shell

== Awards ==
- His book, Children of Bondage: A Social History of the Slave Society at the Cape of Good Hope, 1652–1813 was the runner-up for the prestigious BJ Venter national book award in 1997.

== Quotes ==
"Robert Shell's account is slightly different. He argues that Christianity's change of heart only applied to baptized slaves, and the issue of whether slaves should be baptized was very contentious as late as 1618 when it was raised at the Synod of Dort, the last meeting of Protestant theologians from Great Britain and the Continent. Although the delegates could not agree on a single policy, Shell maintains, their writings ended or limited the trade in Christian slaves.
