= TB Davie Memorial Lecture =

The annual TB Davie Memorial Lecture on academic freedom was established by University of Cape Town to commemorate the work of Thomas Benjamin Davie, vice-chancellor of the university from 1948 to 1955 and a defender of the principles of academic freedom.

== Past speakers ==
Year	Speaker	Subject
1959	A van de Sandt Centlivres	Thomas Benjamin Davie
1960	Cornelis de Kiewiet	Academic freedom
1961	Z. K. Matthews	African awakening and the universities
1962	Harry Oppenheimer	The conditions for progress in Africa
1963	Sir Robert Tredgold	Ideas, ideologies & idolatries
1964	Robert H. Thouless	Rationality & prejudice
1965	Sir Robert Birley	The shaking off of burdens
1966	A van Selms Nisibis	The oldest university
1968	Erik Erikson	Insight and freedom
1969	Barbara Ward, Lady Jackson	A new history
1971	W A Visser T’Hooft	A responsible university in a responsible society
1972	Alpheus H Zulu	The dilemma of a black South African
1972	John, Lord Redcliffe Maud	National progress and the university
1973	René Dumont	University autonomy and rural development in Africa
1974	R Coles	Children and political authority
1975	Juliet Mitchell	Women and equality
1976	A H Halsey	Academic freedom & the idea of a university
1977	Lord Goodman	The university's special role
1978	Geoff Budlender	Looking forward
1979	Martin Legassick	Academic Struggle and The Worker's Struggle (published not delivered)
1980	Ivan Illich	Shadow work, industrial division of toil (published not delivered)
1981	Terrence Ranger	Toward a radical practice of academic freedom: the experience
1982	Howard Zinn	Academic freedom: collaboration & resistance
1982	Julius Tomin	Academic freedom in a repressive society
1983	Helen Joseph	The doors of learning & culture shall be open
1984	Raymond Suttner	The freedom charter - the people's charter in the 1980s
1986	Albert Nolan	Academic freedom: a service to the people
1986	Hoosen Coovadia	From ivory tower to a people's university
1990	E R Wolf	Freedom and freedoms: An anthropological perspective
1990	Walter Sisulu	The road to liberation
1991	E W Said	Identity, authority & freedom: the potentate & the traveller
1992	G C Spivak	Thinking academic freedom in gendered post-coloniality
1993	C H Long	The gift of speech and the travail of language
1994	E Foner	The story of American freedom
1996	O Patterson	The paradoxes of freedom in America
1997	Noam Chomsky	Market democracy in a neoliberal order: Doctrines and reality
1999	Alan Ryan	Academic freedom: Human right or professorial privilege?
2001?	Wole Soyinka	Arms and the arts: a continent's unequal dialogue
2002	Kader Asmal	Breaking with the past, planning for the future
2003	Frederik van Zyl Slabbert	Is academic freedom still an issue in the new South Africa?
2004	Jonathan D. Jansen	Accounting for Autonomy: How Higher Education lost its Innocence
2006	Alan Charles Kors	The Essential Relationship of Academic Freedom to Human Liberty
2007	Achille Mbembe	Race and Freedom in Black Thought
2009	Nithaya Chetty	Universities in a Time of Change
2010	Robin Briggs	The Knowledge Economy and Academic Freedom
2011	Nadine Strossen	Some Reflections on the British and French Cases: Post-9/11 Threats to Academic Freedom
2012	Ferial Haffajee	Creeping Censorship and the Spearing of Freedom
2013	Jonathan Glover	Universities, the Market and Academic Freedom
2014	Max du Preez	The mediocrity of intellectual discourse: misrepresenting South Africa in the academy and beyond
2015	Kenan Malik	Free Speech in an Age of Identity Politics
2017	Mahmood Mamdani	Decolonising the postcolonial university
2018	Pumla Dineo Gqola	Between Academic Inheritance and the Urgency of Definitions
2019	Steven Salaita	The inhumanity of academic freedom
2020	Ravi Kanbur	Economic inequality begets academic inequality
2021	Yunus Ballim	Ours is to educate, not to captivate
2022	Fran Baum	Corporatising universities threatens academic freedom
2023	Sakhela Buhlungu	University of Fort Hare – a tale of academic freedom and institutional autonomy
2024	Dire Tladi	The Narrative as the Enemy of Freedom of Thought
2025	Loretta Ross	‘Call in, not out’: Activist on justice with compassion
