= Reginald W. James =

British researcher (1891–1964)

Professor Reginald James FRS
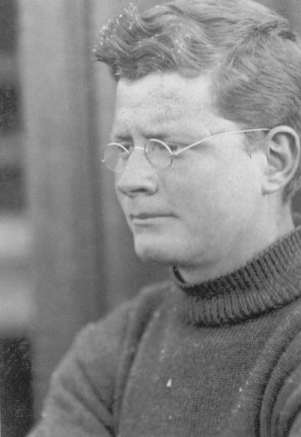
- Born: Reginald William James; 9 January 1891; London, England
- Died: 7 July 1964 (aged 73); Cape Town, South Africa
- Education: St. John's College, Cambridge
- Known for: Imperial Trans-Antarctic Expedition
- Spouse: Annie Watson
- Children: 3
- Awards: Fellow of the Royal Society; Polar Medal
- Scientific career
- Workplaces: University of Cambridge; University of Manchester; University of Cape Town

Reginald William James FRS (9 January 1891 – 7 July 1964) was a British researcher and teacher of physics in England and South Africa. He is best known for his service in the Imperial Trans-Antarctic Expedition of 1914–1916, for which he was awarded the Silver Polar Medal.

== Early life ==
James was born on 9 January 1891 in London. After displaying adolescent skills as a maths prodigy, he was awarded a stipend to pursue studies in St. John's College, Cambridge.

== Career ==
James signed on as an expedition physicist in the Imperial Trans-Antarctic Expedition led by Sir Ernest Shackleton, which departed England on the Endurance in August 1914; James had expected to winter over at the expedition's projected base on the Weddell Sea but the ice-beset expedition vessel never made Antarctic landfall and, with the rest of the ship's company, James found himself a castaway. His journal of life on a Weddell Sea ice floe and on Elephant Island survives.

Upon the rescue of the men from Elephant Island in 1916, James found his country fighting World War I. He joined the Royal Engineers, rising to the rank of captain and performing tasks relating to acoustic artillery spotting on the Western Front. With the coming of peace, James turned to academia at the University of Manchester. He was a lecturer in 1919, a senior lecturer in 1921, and a Reader in 1934. He was elected to Membership of the Manchester Literary and Philosophical Society in 1923.

He specialised in problems of X-ray crystallography.

1936–1937 saw a change in James' personal and professional life. In the first year he married Annie Watson, and in the second year he changed institutions to the University of Cape Town, which offered him the rank of professor. One of his MSc students there was Aaron Klug. His professional career reached culmination in 1953–1957 when he served as Vice-Chancellor of the university. He was elected as a Fellow of the Royal Society in 1955.

James began the process of his retirement in 1958 and, beset by progressive cardiovascular disease, wound down his teaching duties over the following five years. He died in Cape Town at age 73 on 7 July 1964, and was survived by three children.

Professional and academic associations
Preceded by John Allan	President of the Manchester Literary and Philosophical Society; 1935–37	Succeeded by Robert Henry Clayton
Academic offices
Preceded by TB Davie	Acting Vice-Chancellor of the University of Cape Town; 1956–1957	Succeeded by Jacobus Duminy
