= Arthur Wellesley Falconer =

South African academic (1880–1954)

Arthur Wellesley Falconer C.B.E., D.S.O., M.D., F.R.C.P. LL.D. (9 May 1880, Stonehaven, Kincardine, Scotland - 26 September 1954, Cape Town, South Africa) was the first professor of medicine at the University of Cape Town and later vice-chancellor from 1938 to 1947.

== Early life ==
Falconer was born in Scotland where his father, Robert, was a solicitor. He studied at Aberdeen University, before working in both Berlin and Vienna. He then spent nine months as a ship's surgeon. He later held senior resident posts in Bradford and Bristol, and worked in London. In 1912 he returned to Aberdeen where he became assistant professor of medicine under Sir Ashley Mackintosh. In 1914 he was mobilised in the R.A.M.C.. He was sent to Salonika in 1916 as the officer-in-charge of the medical division of the 43rd General Hospital. He was promoted lieutenant-colonel and appointed physician to the British Forces in 1917.

== Academic career ==
After demobilisation he returned to his prewar position in Aberdeen, before being appointed the first professor of medicine at the University of Cape Town. He became vice-chancellor of the university in 1938.

== Awards ==
His distinguished war record was recognised with a DSO in 1918, and a CBE in 1919. His contributions in his field were acknowledged with an honorary LL.D from Cape Town in 1948, and his honorary fellowship of the Royal Society of Medicine.

== Personal life ==
In 1914 he married Phyllis Anderson, the daughter of a colonel in the Indian Medical Service; they had one son and one daughter. His son, also named Arthur Wellesley, was the Medical Superintendent at Groote Schuur Hospital.

Academic offices
Preceded by Sir John Carruthers Beattie	Vice-Chancellor of the University of Cape Town; 1938–1947	Succeeded by TB Davie
