= Thomas Benjamin Davie =

South African pathologist and university principal

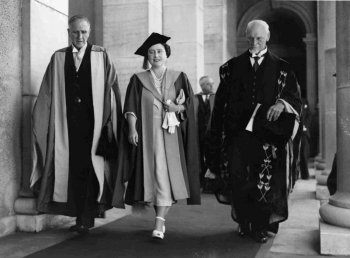
Queen Elizabeth in procession into the Jameson Hall, flanked by Dr T.B. Davie, Vice-Chancellor (left) and General Jan Smuts, Chancellor.

Thomas Benjamin Davie (23 November 1895, Prieska, Cape Province - 13 December 1955, London, England) was an academic and vice-chancellor of the University of Cape Town from 1948 until his death.

Davie graduated from Victoria College with a BA, before training as a primary school teacher. He taught at schools in the Orange Free State and Transvaal. In 1933 he began his academic career in medical science, rising to become dean of the faculty. His tenure as vice-chancellor coincided with the Nationalist Party's introduction of legislation to govern universities. UCT opposed the draft legislation that became the Extension of University Education Act, 1959.

Davie's name has become synonymous with academic freedom and university autonomy, and the TB Davie Memorial Lecture is held yearly. Notable speakers have included former chief justice and UCT chancellor, Albert van der Sandt Centlivres, who delivered the first lecture in 1959; intellectual activist and struggle icon ZK Matthews; Walter Sisulu delivered the 30th TB Davie Memorial Lecture in 1990; and Nobel-winning Nigerian writer Wole Soyinka delivered the lecture in 1999.

Academic offices
Preceded by AW Falconer	Vice-Chancellor of the University of Cape Town; 1948–1955	Succeeded by RW James
