= Jacobus Duminy =

South African cricketer and academic

Vice-Chancellor of University of Cape Town
- In office 1958–1967
- Chancellor: The Hon. Mr Justice Albert van der Sandt Centlivres
- Preceded by: RW James
- Succeeded by: Richard Luyt

Personal details
- Born: 16 December 1897 Bellville, Cape Town, Cape Colony
- Died: 31 January 1980 (aged 82) Cape Town, South Africa
- Education: University College
- Cricket career

Cricket information
- Batting: Left-handed
- Bowling: Slow left-arm orthodox

International information
- National side: South Africa
- Test debut: 24 December 1927 v England
- Last Test: 13 July 1929 v England

Career statistics
Competition	Test	First-class
Matches	3	13
Runs scored	30	557
Batting average	5.00	29.31
100s/50s	0/0	1/3
Top score	12	168*
Balls bowled	60	915
Wickets	1	12
Bowling average	39.00	30.66
5 wickets in innings	0	1
10 wickets in match	0	0
Best bowling	1/17	6/40
Catches/stumpings	2/–	11/–
- Source: Cricinfo, 10 September 2022

Jacobus Petrus Duminy (16 December 1897 – 31 January 1980) was a South African academic who became principal and vice-chancellor of the University of Cape Town. As a young man, he was also a cricketer who played in 3 Tests from 1927 to 1929. He was born at Bellville, a suburb of Cape Town and died at Groote Schuur Hospital, also in Cape Town. In his obituary in Wisden Cricketers' Almanack he is called "Johannes Petrus Duminy".

== Life and academic career ==
Duminy grew up on a farm in the Tygerberg Hills. He published a memoir, Twilight over the Tygerberg, in 1979. He went to study at University College, Oxford, as a Rhodes Scholar at the age of 23. Duminy served as chairman of various academic commissions.

During his tenure as vice-chancellor of the University of Cape Town he resolutely opposed apartheid, sometimes at personal risk. He also helped established multi-racial cricket weeks for boys and girls.

== Cricket career ==
As a cricketer, Duminy was a left-handed opening or middle-order batsman and a slow left-arm orthodox spin bowler. His cricket career was episodic: two matches in 1919–20, one in 1921, and then a few more in 1927–28 and 1928–29, followed by three further games under unusual circumstances in 1929. He was not successful in his two appearances for Western Province against the Australian Forces team in 1919–20, and made 0 and 2 in his only first-class game for Oxford University in 1921, when he was a Rhodes scholar; he did, however, win a "Harlequin" cap as a member of the university second cricket team.

Duminy reappeared in first-class cricket in the 1927–28 South African season, playing for Transvaal in two matches against the MCC touring team. In the first, he made an unbeaten 95, and in the second he scored 55 and was then not out for 74 when the match was left drawn. That led to his selection for the first Test of a five-match series: he was not successful in the match at Johannesburg with the bat, scoring 0 and 4, but his left-arm spin, used as the sixth bowler in the South African attack, broke up a second-wicket partnership of 230 between Herbert Sutcliffe and Ernest Tyldesley which took England's first-innings total past South Africa's with only one wicket down. Duminy did not play in the second or third Tests, but when the tour returned to Johannesburg in late January, he was picked for the fourth Test, although he had played no first-class cricket in the meantime: the move was again unsuccessful, and he scored just 7 and 5.

In 1928–29, the Currie Cup was not contested, but Duminy appeared in three first-class matches for Transvaal. In the third of these, against Border, he made the only century of his first-class career, an unbeaten 168, and took six wickets in a single innings for 40 runs, half his career total of wickets. That was his final first-class game in South Africa. The codicil to his career was an odd one. He was not picked for the 1929 tour of England, but in the summer of 1929 was in Europe. The contemporary Wisden Cricketers' Almanack report states that he "happened to be on a business or professional visit to Europe"; Wisden's obituary of Duminy in 1981 is more specific and says "he was holidaying in Switzerland when he was sent for to join a team beset with injuries". He was conscripted straight into the Test team for the third match of a five-game series at Leeds, and once again, he was not a success, scoring 2 and 12. He stayed with the South African team for the next two first-class matches after the Test, but then departed, and did not play first-class cricket again.

Academic offices
Preceded by RW James	Vice-Chancellor of the University of Cape Town; 1958–1967	Succeeded by Sir Richard Luyt
