= University of Cape Town =

Public university in Cape Town, South Africa

- Universiteit van Kaapstad; iYunivesithi yaseKapa
- Former name: South African College
- Motto: Latin: Spes Bona
- Motto in English: "Good Hope"
- Type: Public
- Established: 1 October 1829; 196 years ago
- Academic affiliations: AAU; ACU; CHEC; HESA; IARU; IAU; WUN
- Endowment: ZAR 11.8 billion (US$901 million)
- Chancellor: Precious Moloi-Motsepe
- Vice-Chancellor: Mosa Moshabela
- Head: Mosa Moshabela
- Academic staff: 1,176
- Administrative staff: 3,179
- Students: 28,233
- Undergraduates: 16,530
- Postgraduates: 11,193
- Location: Cape Town, Western Cape, South Africa; 33°57′27″S 18°27′38″E
- Campus: 4 suburban and 2 urban campuses
- Acceptance Rate: 4.85%
- Colours: Light blue, dark blue, black, white
- Nickname: Ikeys
- Mascot: Ikey Tiger
- Website: uct.ac.za

The University of Cape Town (UCT) (Afrikaans: Universiteit van Kaapstad, Xhosa: iYunivesithi yaseKapa) is a public research university in Cape Town, South Africa.

Established in 1829 as the South African College, it was granted full university status in 1918, making it the oldest university in South Africa and the oldest university in Sub-Saharan Africa in continuous operation.

UCT is organised in 57 departments across six faculties offering bachelor's (NQF 7) to doctoral degrees (NQF 10) solely in the English language. Home to 30,000 students, it encompasses six campuses in the Cape Town suburbs of Rondebosch, Cape Town CBD, Observatory, Mowbray, and V&A Waterfront. It is the only African member of the Global University Leaders Forum (GULF) within the World Economic Forum, which is made up of 26 of the world's top universities.

Five alumni, staff members, or researchers associated with UCT have won the Nobel Prize. Eighty-eight staff members are part of the Academy of Sciences of South Africa.

== History ==
=== Early history ===
The University of Cape Town was founded at a meeting in the Groote Kerk in 1829 as the South African College, a high school for young men. The college had a small tertiary-education facility, introduced in 1874 that grew substantially after 1880, when the discovery of gold and diamonds in the north – and the resulting demand for skills in mining – gave it the financial boost it needed to grow. The college developed into a fully fledged university during the period 1880 to 1900, thanks to increased funding from private sources and the government.

During these years, the college built its first dedicated science laboratories, and started the departments of mineralogy and geology to meet the need for skilled personnel in the country's emerging diamond and gold-mining industries. The UCT crest was designed in 1859 by Charles Davidson Bell, Surveyor-General of the Cape Colony at the time. Bell was an accomplished artist who also designed medals and the triangular Cape stamp. Another key development during this period was the admission of women.

In 1886 the professor of chemistry, Paul Daniel Hahn, convinced the council to admit four women into his chemistry class on a trial basis. Owing to the exceptional standard of work by the women students, the college decided to admit women students permanently in honour of Queen Victoria's Diamond Jubilee in 1887.

The years 1902 to 1918 saw the establishment of the Medical School, the introduction of engineering courses and a Department of Education. UCT was formally established as a university in 1918, on the basis of the Alfred Beit bequest and additional substantial gifts from mining magnates Julius Wernher and Otto Beit. The new university also attracted substantial support from well-wishers in the Cape Town area and, for the first time, a significant state grant.

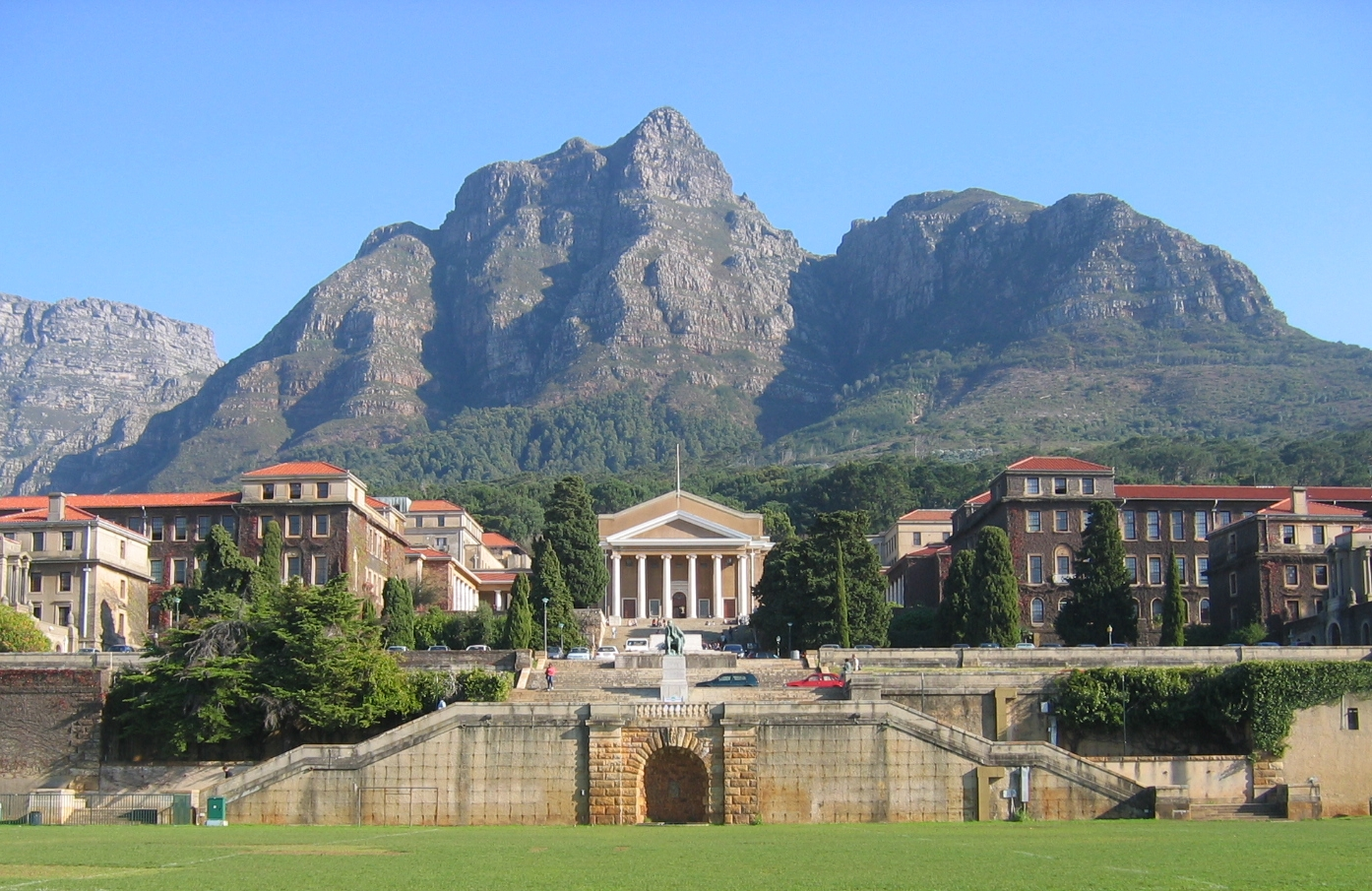
View from the east of the Upper Campus at Groote Schuur on the slopes of Devil's Peak; the university moved here in 1928.

In 1928, the university was able to move the bulk of its facilities to Groote Schuur on the slopes of Devil's Peak, on land bequeathed to the nation by Cecil John Rhodes as the site for a national university. UCT celebrated its centenary the following year.

=== Apartheid era ===
Apart from establishing itself as a leading research and teaching university in the decades that followed, UCT earned itself the nickname "Moscow on the Hill" during the period 1960 to 1990 for its sustained opposition to apartheid, particularly in higher education. In 1968 the university withdrew the appointment of a black lecturer, Archie Mafeje, under pressure from the government which had declared it a white educational institution. This led to a nine-day protest by hundreds of students; an early example of resistance to apartheid by progressive whites.

The university admitted its first small group of black students in the 1920s. The number of black students remained relatively low until the 1980s and 90s, when the institution, reading and welcoming the signs of change in the country, committed itself to a deliberate and planned process of internal transformation.

From the 1980s to the early 1990s, the number of black students admitted to the university rose by 35 percent. By 2004, nearly half of UCT's 20,000 students were black and just under half of the student body was female. Today the university boasts having one of the most diverse campuses in South Africa.

=== Post-Apartheid era ===
Rhodes Must Fall (#RhodesMustFall on social media) was a protest movement that began on 9 March 2015, originally directed against a statue at the University of Cape Town (UCT) that commemorates Cecil Rhodes. The campaign for the statue's removal received global attention and led to a wider movement to "decolonise" education across South Africa. On 9 April 2015, following a UCT Council vote the previous night, the statue was removed.

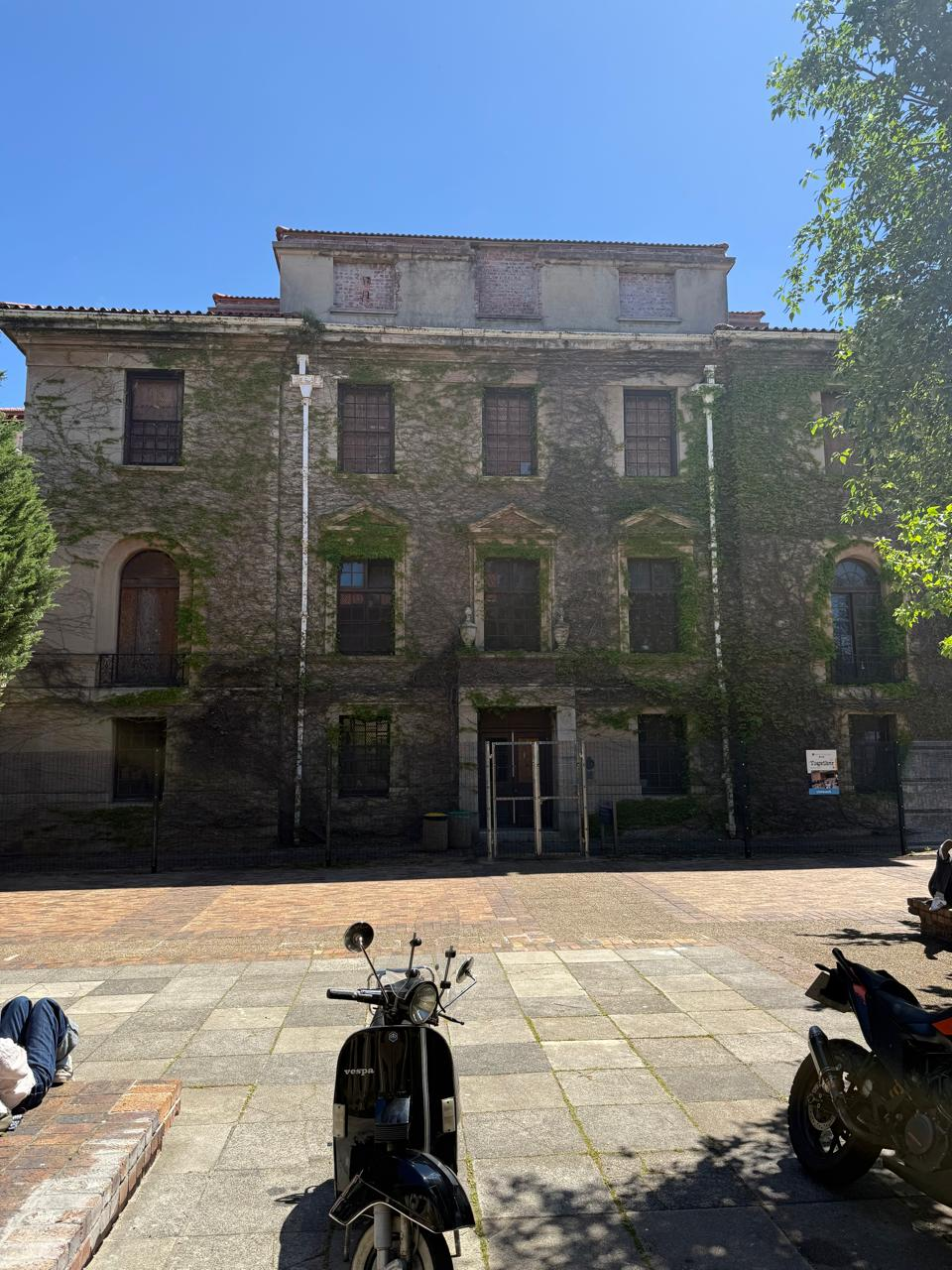
The Jagger library at UCT.

#FeesMustFall was a student protest movement which was arguably indirectly inspired by the RhodesMustFall protest. It formally began at the University of the Witwatersrand and spread to UCT and Rhodes University and then the rest of the South African universities. It called for the abolition of tuition fee increases for the 2016 academic year. Diverse demands arose such as the abolition of fees and decolonisation of higher education which led to substantial changes at South African public universities. At UCT, the Senate began a widespread curriculum reform process and the university began the process of the renaming of buildings on campus (the most notable example was when Jameson Hall was renamed to Sarah Baartman Hall; a process that began in 2019, and was finalized with a ceremony in 2025).

In September 2019, Film and Media studies student Uyinene Mrwetyana went missing. After the community and police began searching, her body was discovered in the Cape Flats area of Cape Town and Luyanda Botha was arrested and convicted for her rape and murder. Her death and the rape and death of other women precipitated widespread public outcry that led to a campus shutdown and protests on campus, at the Parliament precinct in Cape Town CBD and at campuses around South Africa.

Subsequently, President Ramaphosa announced reforms such as harsher punishments for sex offenders and the public disclosure of the National Register for Sex Offenders to stem sexual and physical violence against women and children. Moreover, the Uyinene Mrwetyana Foundation was established and a special fund in her name was created to provide scholarships to female students in the Humanities Faculty.

In March 2020, UCT opened the Neuroscience Institute at the Groote Schuur Hospital in collaboration with the Western Cape Provincial Government, the first dedicated cross- and interdisciplinary centre for the study of and development of treatments for neurological and mental disorders in Africa.

In October 2025, it was announced that UCT would host the first Times Higher Education (THE) World Academic Summit in Africa. The Summit will be held from 29 September to 1 October 2026, and will convene hundreds of global leaders in higher education, research, policy, business, and civil society. The 2026 Summit's theme is, "Knowledge, justice, and futures: Universities in the age of intelligence".

== Campus ==
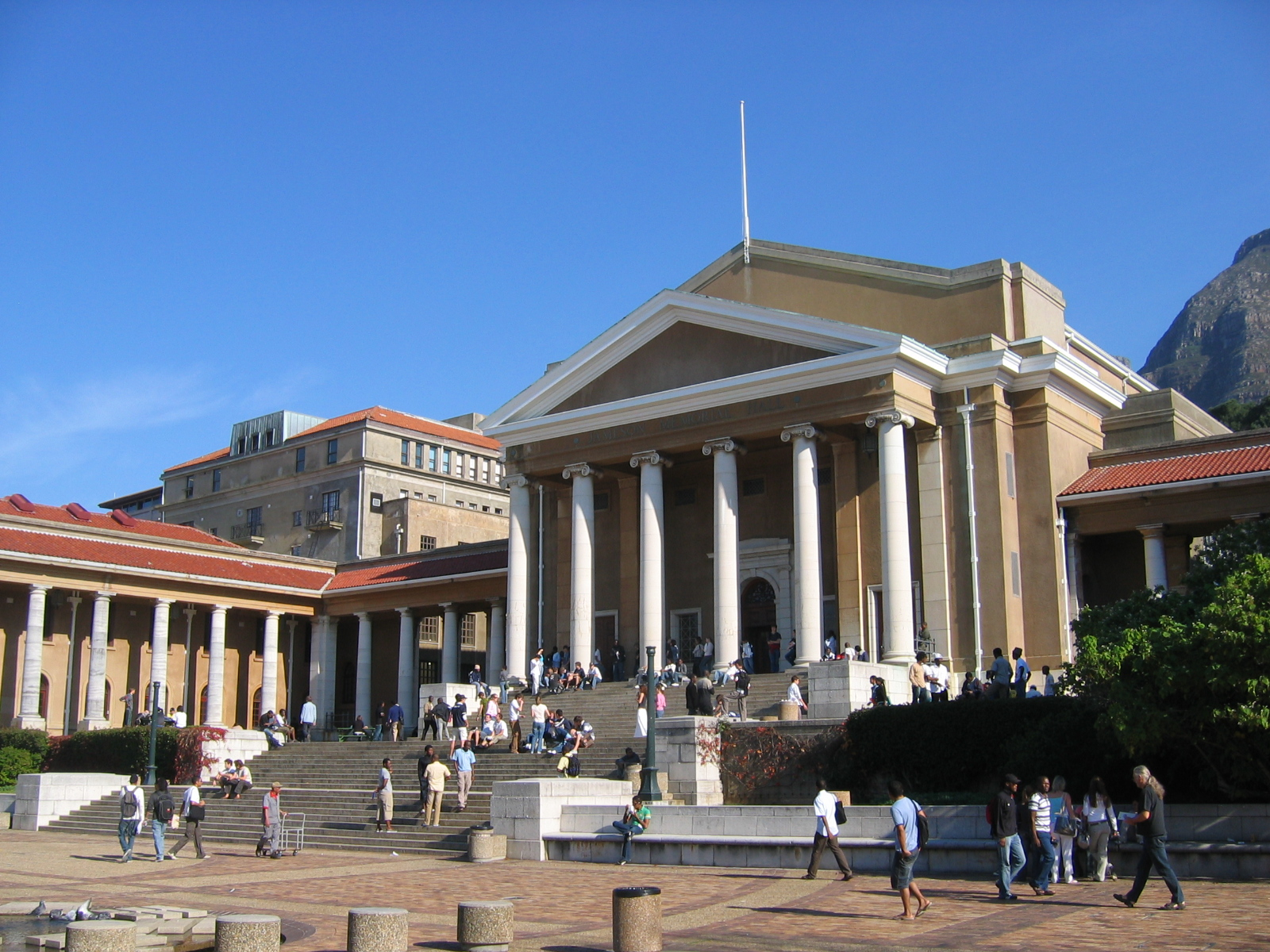
Sarah Baartman Hall and Memorial Plaza, the focal point of Upper Campus.

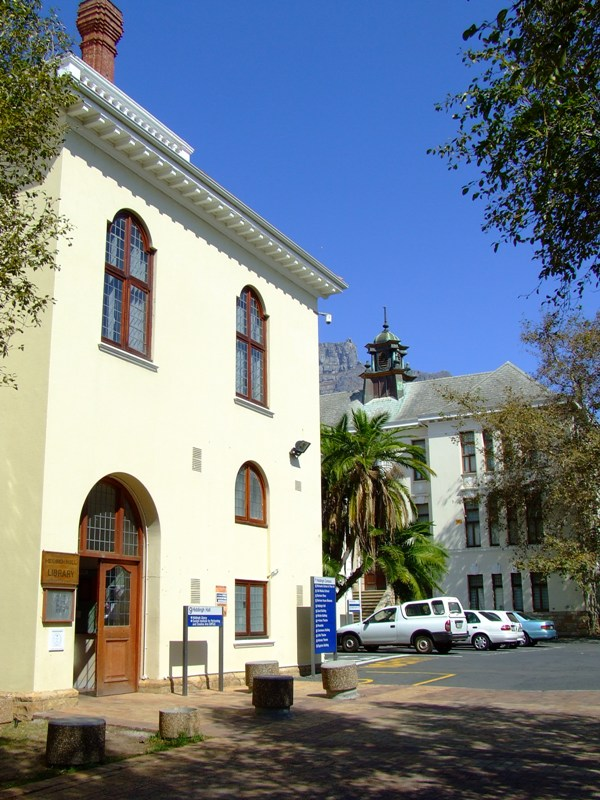
Hiddingh Hall Library on Hiddingh Campus in Gardens, Cape Town.

The main teaching campus, known as Upper Campus, is located on the Rhodes Estate on the slopes of Devil's Peak. This campus contains, in a relatively compact site, the faculties of Science, Engineering, Commerce, and Humanities (except for the arts departments), as well as Smuts Hall and Fuller Hall residences.

Upper Campus is centered on Sarah Baartman Hall, the location for graduation and other ceremonial events, as well as many examinations. The original buildings and layout of Upper Campus were designed by JM Solomon and built between 1928 and 1930. Since that time, many more buildings have been added as the university has grown. Upper Campus is also home to the main library, The Chancellor Oppenheimer Library, which holds the majority of the university's 1.3 million volume collection.

Contiguous with Upper Campus, but separated from it by university sports fields and the M3 expressway, are the Middle and Lower Campuses. These campuses, which are spread through the suburbs of Rondebosch, Rosebank and Mowbray, contain the Law Faculty, the South African College of Music, the School of Economics, most of the student residences, most of the university administrative offices, and various sporting facilities.

The state of the art artificial grass soccer field has been approved by FIFA for training for World Cup teams. The Upper, Middle and Lower Campuses together are often referred to as the "main campus".

The Faculty of Health Sciences is located on the Medical School campus next to the Groote Schuur Hospital in Observatory. The Fine Arts and Drama departments are located on the Hiddingh Campus in central Cape Town. The university's original building, now known as the Egyptian Building, on the Hiddingh campus, was built in the Egyptian Revival style. The only other campus built in this style was the Medical College of Virginia in Richmond, Virginia in the United States. The UCT Graduate School of Business is located on the Breakwater Lodge Campus at the Victoria & Alfred Waterfront.

The Baxter Theatre Centre, located on the Lower Campus, is part of the University of Cape Town; it is also the second largest performing arts complex in Cape Town, after the Artscape Theatre Centre. It has three venues:

- the 665-seat Main Theatre
- the 638-seat Concert Hall, with a Von Beckerath organ
- the 172-seat Golden Arrow Studio

For his contribution of the tract of land which the campus was founded on, a bronze statue of Cecil Rhodes was erected in 1934 on the Upper Campus, overlooking the university's rugby fields. The statue was removed in April 2015 following pressure from student groups due to its representation of South Africa's colonialist apartheid past and the university's inadequate representation of black students, faculty, and staff.

The upper campus was affected by the Table Mountain fire in April 2021; the Jagger Library building, which housed rare books and documents including a large African Studies collection, was gutted.

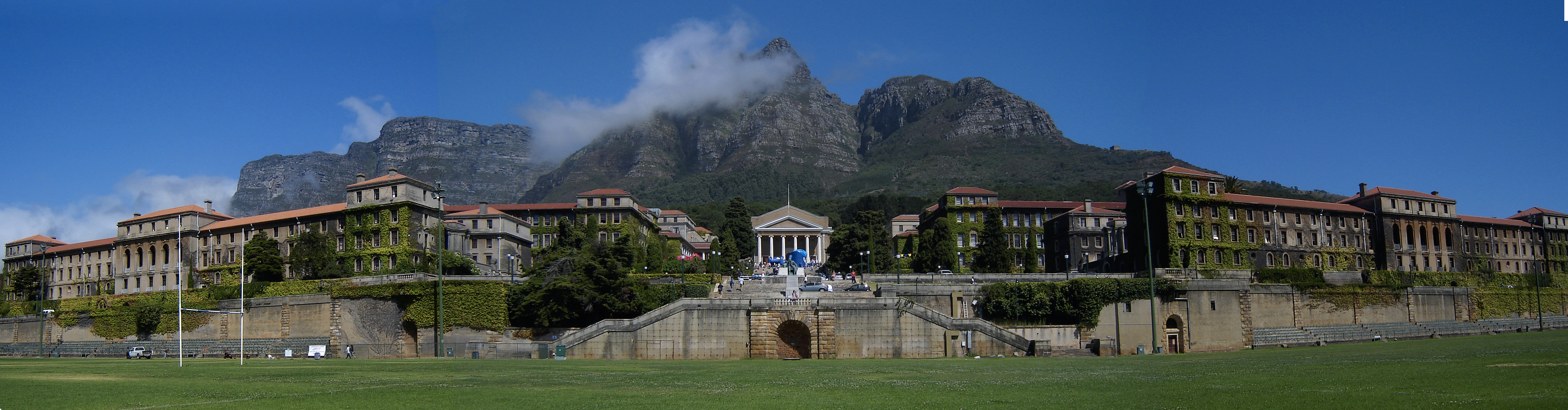
Upper Campus seen from the rugby fields that separate it from Middle Campus, with Devil's Peak in the background

=== Residential halls ===
The university has 19 student residences (or "res" as known colloquially), offering both single-gender and mixed-gender housing. The Department of Student Housing oversees the residence system College House is the oldest university residence in Africa, having been established in 1887.

UCT's residence system is composed of three tiers. Students living in residence are placed in a tier according to the length of time that they have been in the residence system, studying in the university and service or part-time employment in a residence. As a student progresses through their academic journey they are moved into a higher tier. Postgraduate students are usually housed in the third-tier residences unless employed in lower-tier residences.

First-tier residences:

- Avenue Road Residence
- Baxter Hall
- Clarinus Village
- College House
- Dullah Omar Hall
- Fuller Hall
- Glendover Residence
- Graça Machel Hall
- Kilindini
- Kopano Residence
- Leo Marquard Hall
- Rochester House
- Smuts Hall
- Tugwell Hall
- University House
- Varietas

Second-tier residences:

- Forest Hill
- Groote Schuur Flats
- Groote Schuur Residence
- Liesbeeck Gardens
- Medical Residence
- Obz Square
- The Woolsack

Third-tier residences:

- 1 Woodbine Road
- 8 Avenue Road
- Amalinda
- Dullah Omar Hall
- Edwin Hart Annex
- F Block (Forest Hill)
- Harold Cressy Hall
- Inglewood
- JP Duminy Court
- Linkoping
- North Grange
- Rondeberg
- TB Davie Court
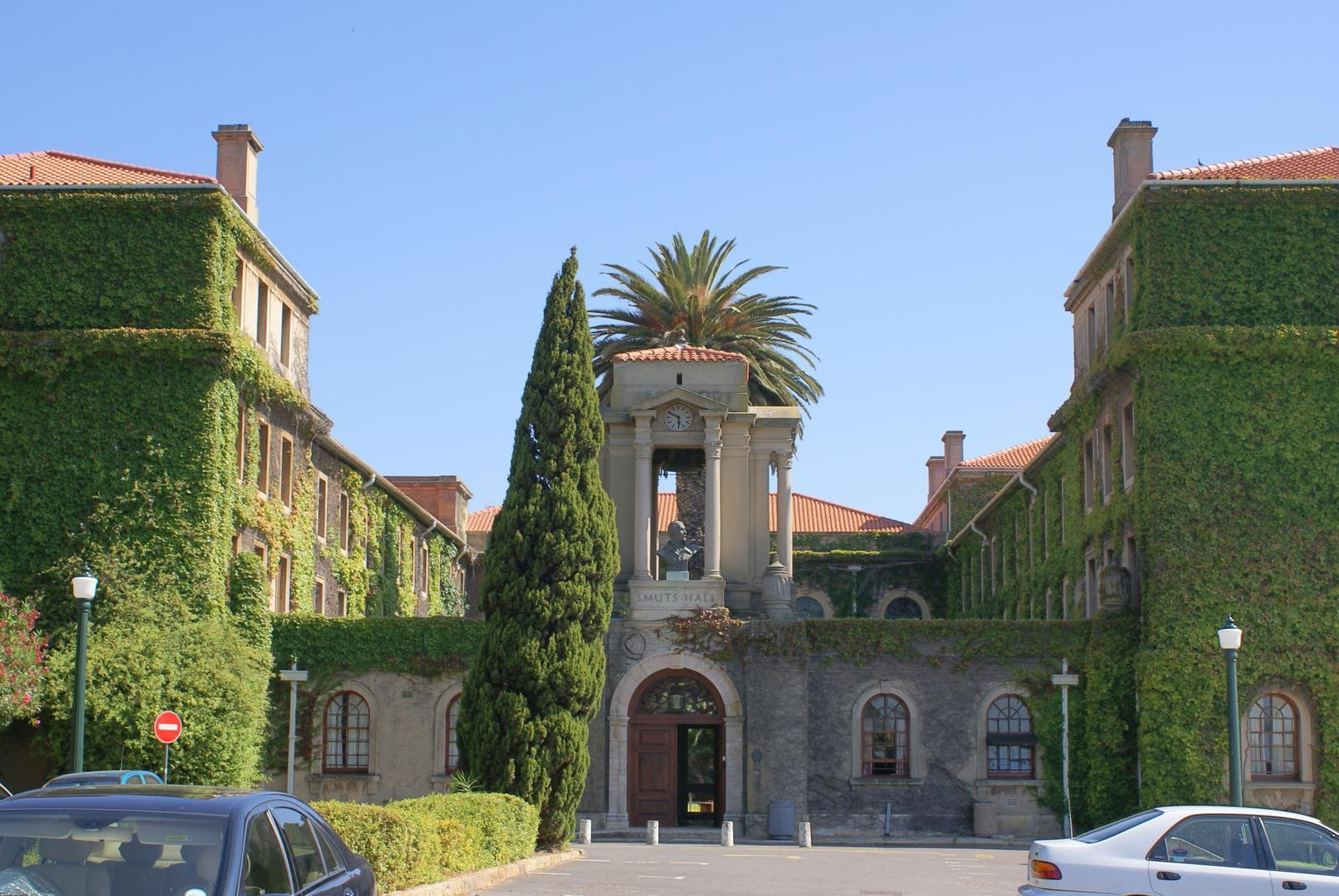
Smuts Hall, built in 1928 on the Upper Campus

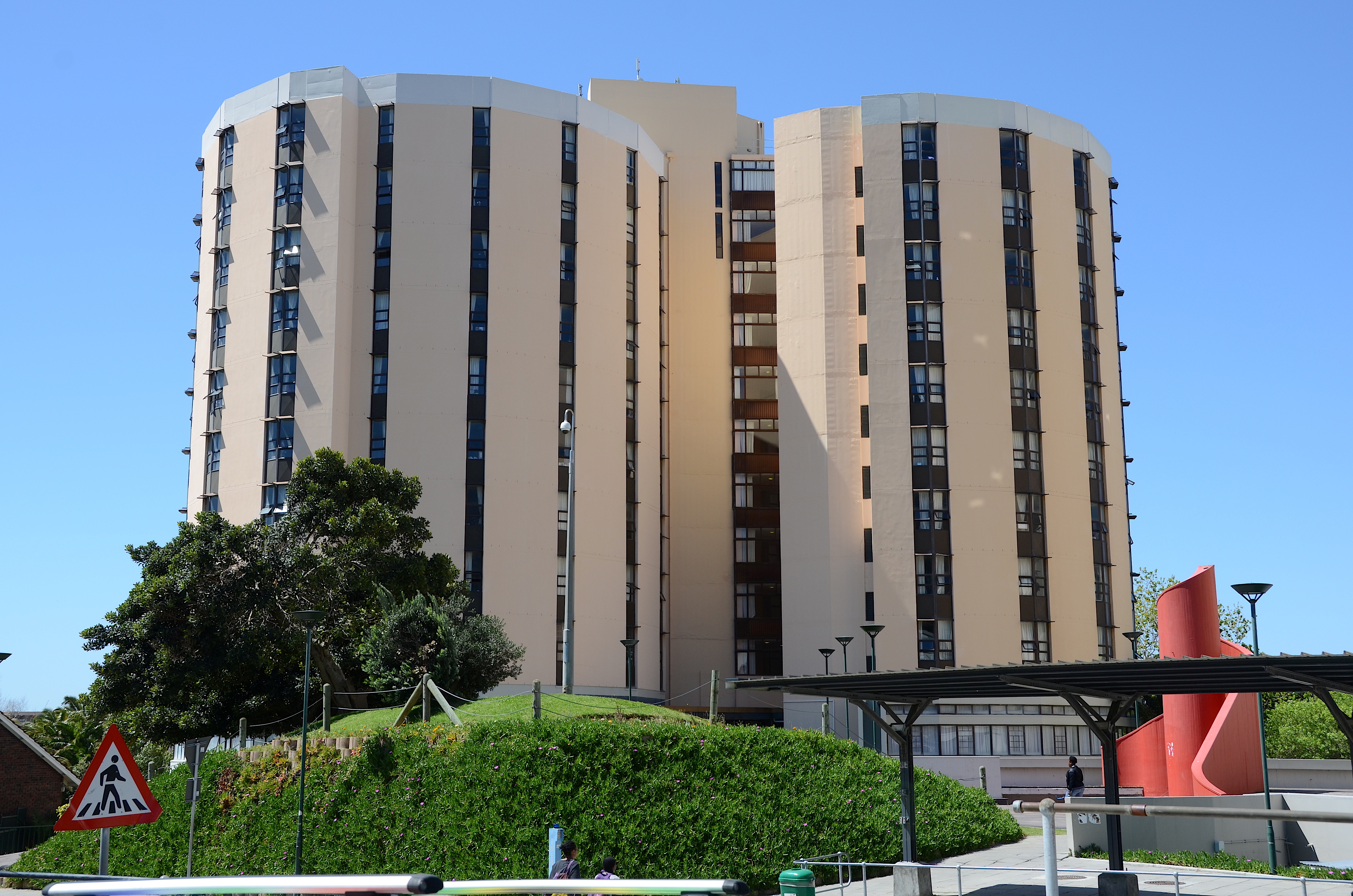
Tugwell Hall, built in 1974 on the Lower Campus

== Organisation ==
=== Administration and governance ===
The University of Cape Town was originally incorporated as a public university by a private act of Parliament, the University of Cape Town Act, 1916 (No. 14 of 1916) in 1918. At present it is incorporated and structured by an institutional statute issued under the provisions of the Higher Education Act, 1997.

The titular head of the university is the chancellor; this is a ceremonial position without executive power. The primary role of the chancellor is to confer degrees on behalf of the university, and to represent the university to the rest of the world. The current Chancellor is fashion entrepreneur and philanthropist Precious Moloi-Motsepe who was elected in November 2019 and assumed the role on 1 January 2020 after the expiration of Ms Graça Machel's second consecutive 10-year term.

The University Council is the highest ranked decision-making and appointative structure in the university. With wide-ranging powers of governance over areas such as the strategy, well-being and mission of the university, it is directly accountable to the Government of the Republic through the Minister of Higher Education, currently Nobuhle Nkabane for matters relating to the university.

It is composed of 30 broad stakeholder representatives such as students, academics, staff and appointees of the City of Cape Town, Convocation, Premier of the Western Cape and the Minister of Higher Education among others, and the presiding officer of the council, the chair, is currently Mr Norman Arendse (SC). The Registrar, who acts as the secretary of the Council and Senate, oversees academic registration and legal matters, and administers the Convocation, is currently Royston Pillay.

The Convocation, composed of alumni, the Vice Chancellor, Deputy Vice Chancellors, academic staff, emeritus professors and emeritus associate professors, is a statutory body administered by the Office of the Registrar, which provides a platform for former members of the university to participate and engage with matters affecting the university. Helmed by the President of the Convocation, currently Mr Kassi Carl Manlan, it can make recommendations and pass non-binding resolutions in its Annual General Meetings.

The Leadership Lekgotla is a coordinating and decision-making structure composed of senior executives of the university who oversee the day-to-day running of the university. It contrasts with the University Council which arises from the University Statute and exercises supreme governance over the university.

The Leadership Lekgotla's members are senior executives who oversee different areas of the university's operations and policies. The most senior executive is the Vice Chancellor (ranked below the Chancellor in the ceremonial protocol and order of precedence of the university) is the de facto head and chief executive of the university, (currently held by Mosa Moshabela), who is accountable to the council.

Below the Vice Chancellor are the Deputy Vice Chancellors of Transformation (currently Professor Elelwani Ramugondo), of Research and Internationalisation (currently Susanne Harris) and of Teaching and Learning (currently Professor Harsha Kathard, acting). The Chief Operations Officer, currently Reno Morar, brings together and oversees the functional, support and technical areas of the university's operations.

University Chancellors & Vice-Chancellors
Chancellor		Vice-Chancellor	
Term	Name & image	Term	Name
1918–1936	H.R.H. the Prince of Wales	1918–1938	Sir John Carruthers Beattie
1936–1950	General Jan Smuts	1938–1947	AW Falconer
1950–1967	The Hon. Mr Justice Albert van der Sandt Centlivres	1948–1955	TB Davie
1950–1967	The Hon. Mr Justice Albert van der Sandt Centlivres	1956–1957	RW James, in an acting capacity
1950–1967	The Hon. Mr Justice Albert van der Sandt Centlivres	1958–1967	Jacobus Duminy
1967–1999	Harry Oppenheimer	1968–1980	Sir Richard Luyt
1967–1999	Harry Oppenheimer	1981–1996	Stuart J Saunders
1967–1999	Harry Oppenheimer	1996–2000	Mamphela Ramphele
1999–2019	Graça Machel	2000–2008	Njabulo Ndebele
1999–2019	Graça Machel	2008–2018	Max Price
2019–present	Precious Moloi-Motsepe	2018–2023	Mamokgethi Phakeng
2019–present	Precious Moloi-Motsepe	2023–2024	Daya Reddy, interim
2019–present	Precious Moloi-Motsepe	2024-	Mosa Moshabela

=== Academic divisions ===
The university is composed of six Faculties (Commerce, Engineering and the Built Environment, Health Sciences, Law, Sciences and Humanities) which together comprise 57 departments. Faculties are helmed by a Dean and their administrative and operational matters are administered by a Director.

The Senate has delegated substantial powers to the faculties in academic matters over their internal protocol and management such as on matters concerning class timetables, admission requirements, academic exclusion, examinations, research projects and so on. Faculties vary substantially in student size and in buildings occupied, with the Commerce faculty having the highest student population and the law faculty having the lowest while the Humanities faculty spans the most buildings followed by the Faculty of Health Sciences with the Commerce and Law faculties having (by far) the lowest physical footprint.

Notwithstanding interdisciplinary research units and centers, additional academic structures exist that eschew the faculty-based organisational structure. The multidisciplinary Center for Higher Education Development ranks on an equal level as the faculties and the UCT Graduate School of Business maintains substantial latitude over its internal affairs despite being nominally part of the Faculty of Commerce.

The interdisciplinary School of Information Technology, comprising the Departments of Information Systems and of Computer Science in the Commerce and Science faculties is neither a faculty nor a department but a coordinating mechanism to promote IT education and research.

The departments of the faculties are listed as follows:

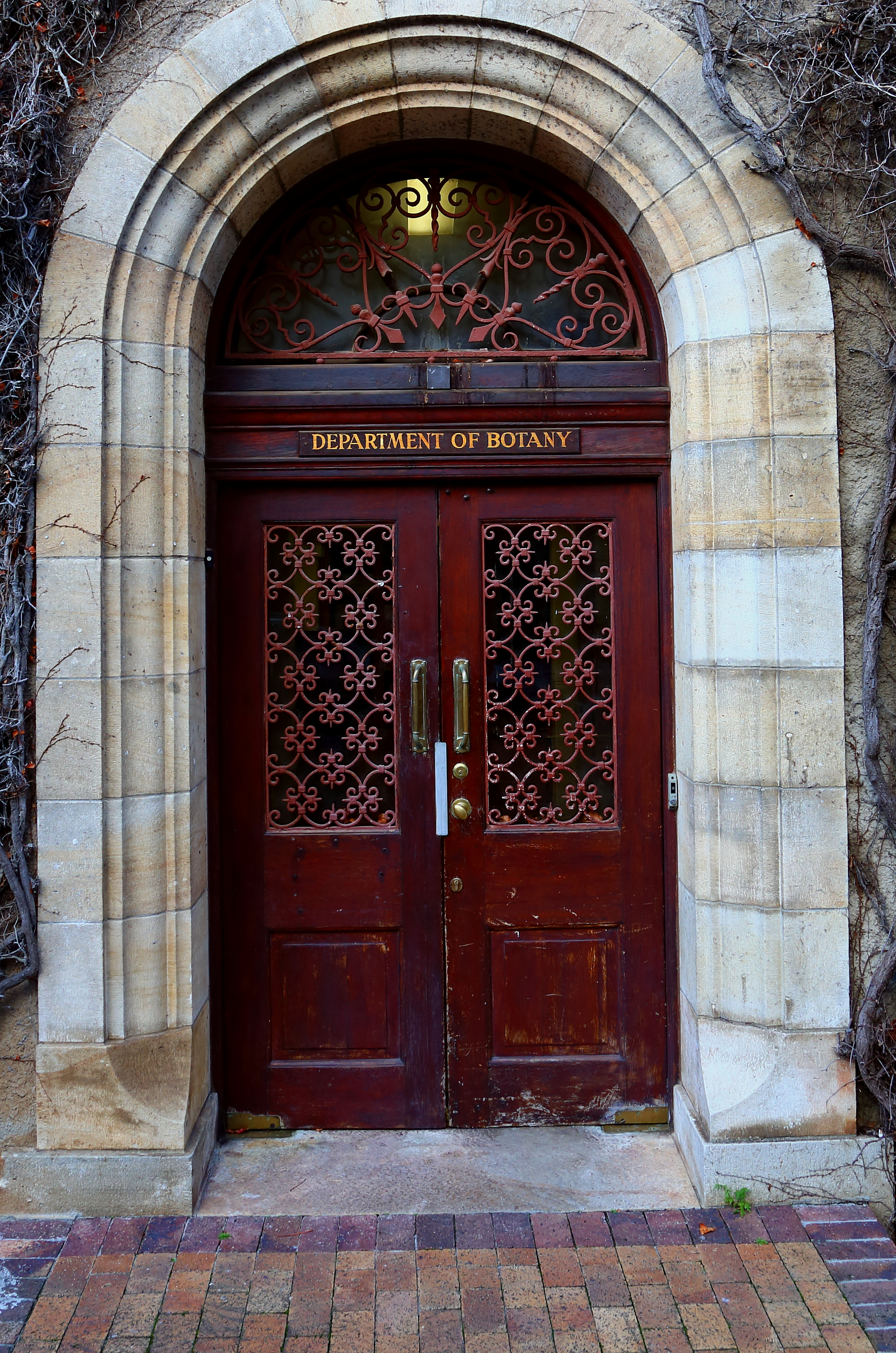
Entrance to the Bolus Herbarium Library in the Department of Botany building.

==== Faculty of Commerce ====
- College of Accounting
- School of Economics (jointly established with Faculty of Humanities)
- Department of Finance and Tax
- Department of Information Systems
- The Nelson Mandela School of Public Governance
- School of Management Studies
- Education Development Unit
- Graduate School of Business

==== Faculty of Engineering and the Built Environment ====
- Department of Architecture, Planning and Geomatics
- Department of Chemical Engineering
- Department of Civil Engineering
- Department of Construction Economics and Management
- Department of Electrical Engineering
- Department of Mechanical Engineering

==== Faculty of Health Sciences ====
- Department of Anaesthesia and Perioperative Medicine
- Department of Health and Rehabilitation Sciences
- Department of Health Sciences Education
- Department of Human Biology
- Department of Integrative Biomedical Sciences
- Department of Medicine
- Department of Obstetrics and Gynaecology
- Department of Paediatrics and Child Health
- Department of Pathology
- Department of Psychiatry and Mental Health
- Department of Public Health and Family Medicine
- Department of Radiation Medicine
- Department of Surgery

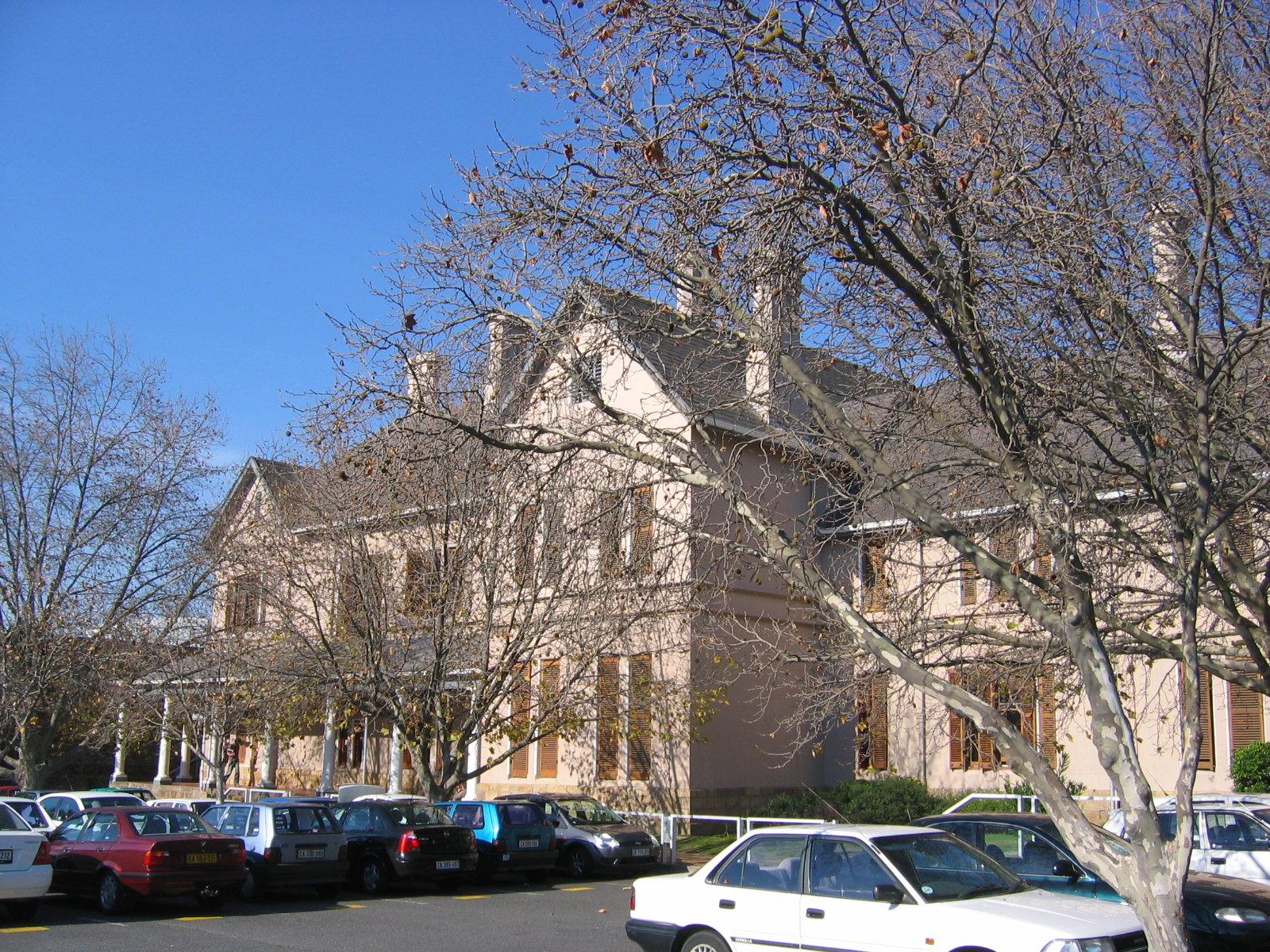
The South African College of Music building, established in 1910.

==== Faculty of Humanities ====
- African Feminist Studies
- Anthropology
- African Studies and Linguistics, including the Centre for African Studies
- Centre for Film and Media Studies
- Education Development Unit
- English Literary Studies
- Historical Studies
- Knowledge and Information Stewardship
- Michaelis School of Fine Art
- Department of Philosophy
- Department of Political Studies
- School of Education
- Department of Psychology
- School of Languages and Literatures
- Department of Social Work & Social Development
- Department of Sociology
- South African College of Music
- Department for the Study of Religions
- Theatre, Dance and Performance Studies

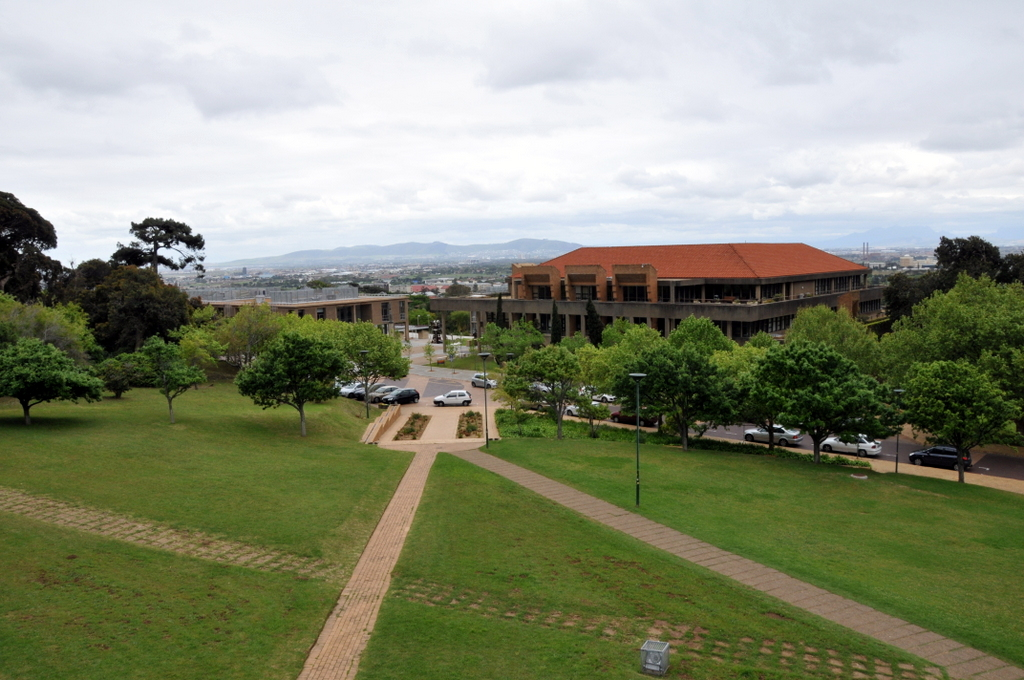
The Kramer Building, home of the smallest faculty, the Law Faculty. The Student Administration building stands to the north (left, in this photo) of the Kramer building, and to the north east stands the School of Economics building, both of which were built in 2011.

==== Faculty of Law ====
- Department of Commercial Law
- Department of Private Law
- Department of Public Law

==== Faculty of Science ====
- Department of Archaeology
- Department of Astronomy
- Department of Biological Sciences
- Department of Chemistry
- Department of Computer Science
- Department of Environmental and Geographical Science
- Department of Geological Sciences
- Department of Mathematics and Applied Mathematics
- Department of Molecular and Cell Biology
- Department of Oceanography
- Department of Physics
- Department of Statistical Sciences

== Funding ==
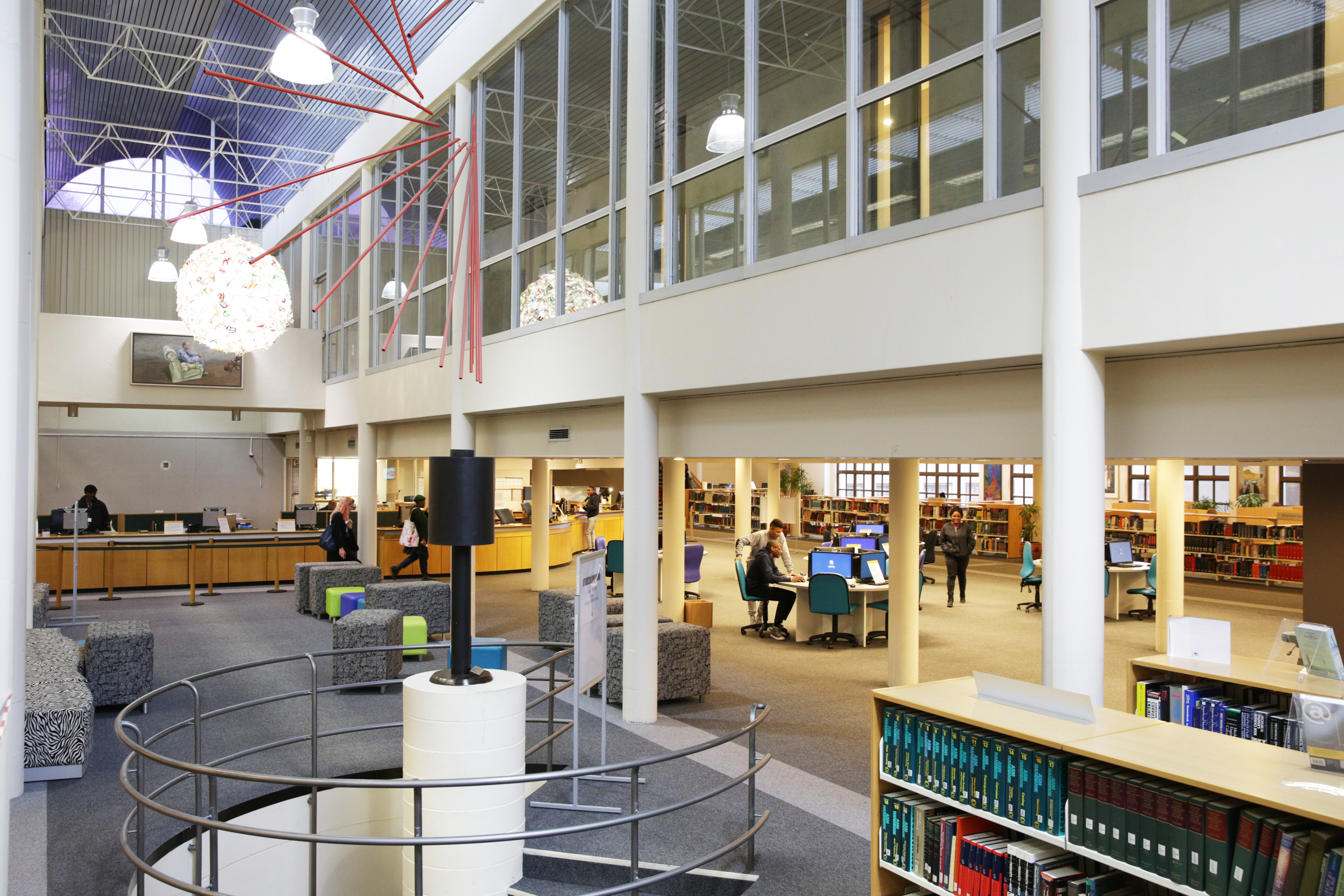
The central section of the Chancellor Oppenheimer Library.

The university's endowment (the financial capital and investment funds on which it can draw to carry out its work) is deposited with the UCT Foundation (a legally independent nonprofit organisation) and it is managed by the Investment Office. Through the Distinguishing UCT fundraising campaign, the university is trying to raise its endowment.

As of 2019, its designated endowment stands at R2.5 billion and its undesignated endowment stands at R676 million with R133 million raised for infrastructure projects (bringing the total undesignated endowment to R809 million which the university aims to increase to R1 billion).

There have been several campaigns at the university to divest its endowment. Fossil Free UCT was formally established in 2015 as a campaign by environmental activism lobbying groups and student organisations, most notably the Green Campus Initiative compel UCT to divest from fossil fuel companies which resulted in a non-binding resolution passed by UCT's Convocation in 2017 to support the divestment.

Student lobby groups, most notably the Palestinian Solidarity Front and the SRC called on the university's management to divest from Israeli companies and organisations working in the Palestinian Occupied Territories (among other demands), which, in the end, the university refused to do. Palestinian groups also pressured the university through 'emcampment' protests organised by UCT4Palestine in 2024, with around 10-20 tents set up in public spaces, despite the university not formally authorising the groups to occupy campus grounds.

The university's income comes from a combination of government grants, tuition fees, donations, investment and research income. In the 2017–2018 financial year, the university received R1.415 billion in state subsidies, R1.428 billion in tuition fees and R539 million in other income. R1.2 billion was committed to student financial aid for both undergraduate and postgraduate students from the university, the government through the NSFAS scheme and the university's partners and donors.

== Students and staff ==
As of 2018, there were 27,907 students; 25% of whom were black South African, 22% were white South African, 18% identified as another race, 15% were international students. In 2016 there were 29,074 students enrolled (18,421 undergraduates and 10,653 postgraduates) and 4,542 staff were employed (1,179 academic and 3,363 professional, administrative, support and service staff).

The UCT Employment Equity Plan April (2010 to 2015) indicated moderate but consistent changes in the demographic makeup of the staff body. The five-year plan specified specific targets ranging from between about 5% to 10% adjustments in the representation of SA black staff. According to the plan the staff makeup would have changed by 2015 by achieving either parity or more SA black staff than SA white in all categories other than senior lecturer and professor positions.

UCT spokesperson Elijah Moholola noted that, in 2017, UCT employed 45 white professors, 38 black African, Cape Coloured or Indian South African professors, 67 foreign national professors and 7 who did not disclose their race.

=== Student enrolment 2009–2013 ===
Student enrolment by population group 2009–2013, showing percentage growth on base:

	2009	2010	2011	2012	2013	2014	% Growth	% Of Total
SA Black	5068	5323	5744	6012	6199	6813	28.67%	25.23%
SA coloured	3623	3653	3687	3530	3573	3601	0.73%	13.34%
SA Indian	1630	1681	1671	1701	1714	1813	11.6%	6.72%
SA White	8984	9183	8992	8814	8434	8093	-10.69%	30%
International	3821	4171	4268	4802	4708	4674	19.57%	17.32%
Other	886	1003	1146	1191	1488	1993	73.28%	7.39%
Total	24012	25014	25508	26505	26116	26987	-0.32%	100%

Demographic of University Student Enrollments in 2021
Program	Asian	Black	Coloured	Indian	White	International (Rest of Africa)	Undeclared
Undergraduate	0.50%	32%	12%	5%	14%	7%	30%
Postgraduate	0.50%	25%	12%	5%	14%	18%	20%
PhD	0.50%	21%	9%	6%	20%	35%	8.9%

=== Student enrolment 2020–present ===
Student enrollment by race
Year	Black (Number)	Black (%)	White (Number)	White (%)	Coloured (Number)	Coloured (%)	Indian (Number)	Indian (%)	International	International (%)	Unknown (Number)	Unknown (%)	Total
2020	7,915	28,03%	5,353	18,96%	3,738	13,24%	1,599	5,66%	4,068	14,41%	5,560	19,70%	28,233
2021	8,787	29,67%	4,899	16,55%	3,753	12,67%	1,580	5,34%	3,658	12,35%	6,931	23,41%	29,608
2022	8,259	28,27%	4,222	14,45%	3,514	12,03%	1,442	5%	3,702	12,67%	8,072	27,63%	29,211
2023	10,414	35,87%	5,261	18,12%	4,149	14,29%	1,819	6,26%	3,526	12,15%	3,862	13,30%	29,031
2024	11,667	39,69%	5,591	19,01%	4,562	15,52%	1,939	6,60%	4,655	15,84%	982	3,34%	29,396

== Student life ==
UCT had 36 different sports clubs in 2003, including team sports, individual sports, extreme sports and martial arts.

The university's sports teams, in particular the rugby union team, are known as the "Ikey Tigers" or the "Ikeys". The "Ikey" nickname originated in the 1910s as an antisemitic epithet applied to UCT students by the students of Stellenbosch University, because of the supposed large number of Jewish students at UCT.

Stellenbosch is UCT's traditional rugby opponent; an annual "Intervarsity" match is played between the two universities. The University of Cape Town Football Club also known as the "Ikeys Warriors" is the main team for association football (soccer), representing the university at tournaments such as Varsity Football.

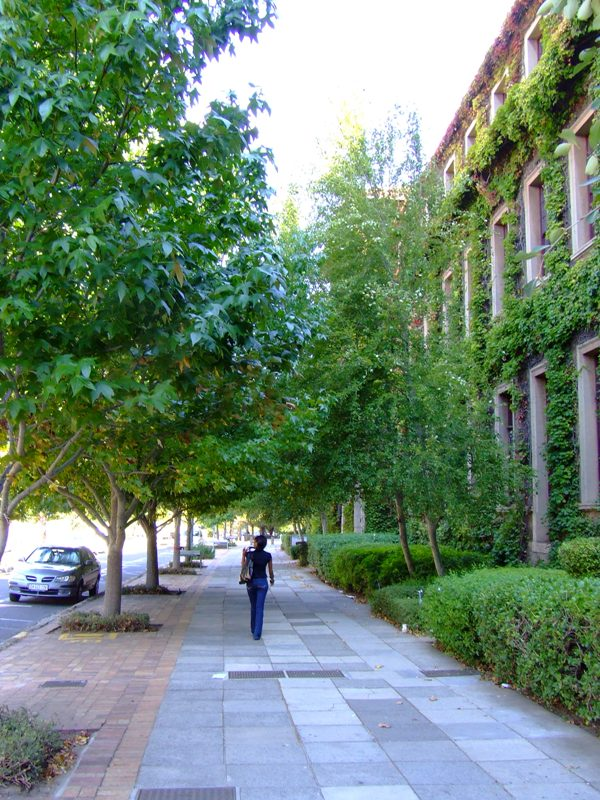
North end of University Avenue looking south, on Upper Campus

As of 2007 there were more than 80 student societies at UCT, falling into five categories:

- Academic societies for those interested in a particular field of study or studying a particular topic: The most prominent of these include the History and Current Affairs Society (HCA), the Space and Astronomy Society (SpaceSoc, also a SEDS South Africa chapter), the United Nations Association of South Africa (UNASA), and the Students for Law and Social Justice (SLSJ).
- Political societies, including branches of the youth wings of national political parties such as the South African Students Congress (SASCO), the Democratic Alliance Students Organisation (DASO), and the African National Congress Youth League.
- Religious societies, some of which are associated with religious denominations or local places of worship.
- National/cultural societies for students from particular countries or particular ethnic backgrounds.
- Special interest societies (such as RainbowUCT, the university's LGBTI society, UCT Mountain & Ski Club, UCT Ballroom and Latin dancing) for those interested in various activities or issues.

In addition to the plethora of student societies, there are several student organisations dedicated to the development of communities surrounding the university in the Cape Metropolitan Area. Some of the biggest include: SHAWCO, Ubunye and RAG. Recently, several students movements have developed, such as the Green Campus Initiative.

== Rankings ==
University rankings

Global – Overall
- ARWU World: 201-300 (2026)
- CWUR World: 271 (2024)
- CWTS World: 451 (2024)
- QS World: 150 (2026)
- THE World: =164 (2026)
- USNWR Global: 116 (2024-25)

Regional – Overall
- QS BRICS: 22 (2019)
- THE Africa: 1 (2025)
- THE BRICS: 10 (2020)
- USNWR Africa: 1 (2024-25)

The University of Cape Town has, for many consecutive years, ranked as the top university not only in South Africa, but across the continent of Africa. In the 2026 QS World University Rankings, UCT ranked first in the categories of Academic Reputation, Employer Reputation, Sustainability, and Web Impact. In July 2026, UCT was named second best nationally and regionally in the more widely accepted and objective Center for World University Rankings (CWUR), following the University of the Witwatersrand. CWUR places more weight on education and employability scores than other traditional ranking systems, which use research output and subjective surveys to rank universities worldwide.

The university received a rank of 150 in the 2026 QS Rankings, a rank of 164 in the 2026 Times Higher Education World University Rankings, and a rank of 201–300 in the 2024 Shanghai Academic Ranking of World Universities.

The faculties of Commerce, Law and Medicine have appeared in the top 100 faculties internationally. The Faculty of Law achieved a global rank of 40 in the 2014 QS World University Rankings by Subject.

UCT Times Higher Education Ranking 2011 to 2026
Year	World Rank	Change
2026	164	▲16
2025	180	▼13
2024	167	▼7
2023	160	▲23
2022	183	▼28
2021	155	▼19
2020	136	Steady
2019	136	▲35
2018	171	▼23
2017	148	▼28
2016	120	▲4
2015	124	▼2
2014	126	Steady
2013	126	▼23
2012	103	▲4
2011	107	Steady

View source data.

QS World University Rankings Times Higher Education World University Rankings

== Affiliations ==
UCT is a member of the Worldwide Universities Network (WUN), the Association of African Universities, the Association of Commonwealth Universities, the Cape Higher Education Consortium, Higher Education South Africa, the International Alliance of Research Universities (IARU), the African Research Universities Alliance (ARUA) and the International Association of Universities.

The Faculty of Law is a member of the Law Schools Global League (LSGL).

== Notable alumni and staff ==
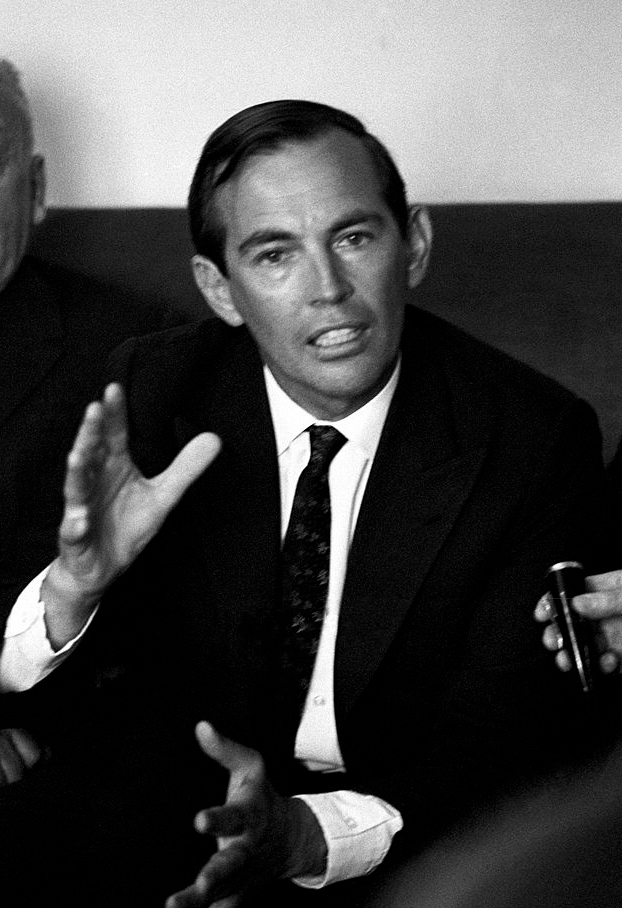
Christiaan Barnard who performed the first human heart transplant was an alumnus and faculty

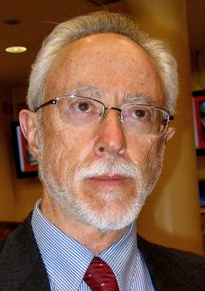
Nobel Prize for Literature laureate, J. M. Coetzee

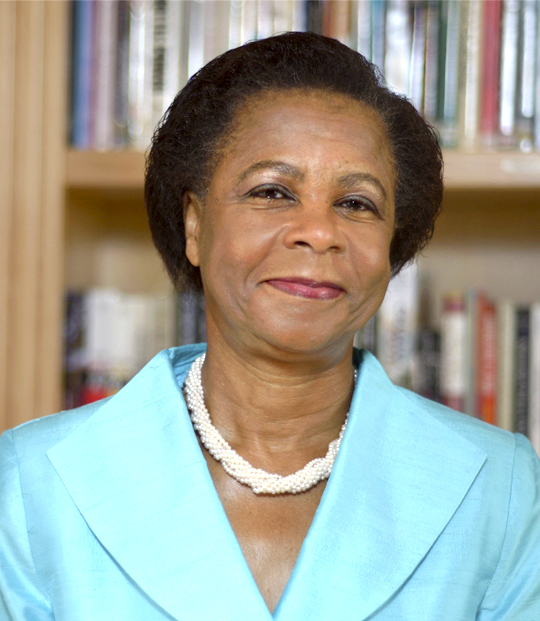
Former UCT Vice-Chancellor and Managing Director of World Bank, Mamphela Ramphele

Five alumni of the University of Cape Town have been awarded Nobel Prizes: Ralph Bunche, American political scientist and diplomat awarded the Nobel Peace Prize in 1950 for his role in the 1949 Armistice Agreements, Professor Allan McLeod Cormack, physicist awarded the Nobel Prize in Medicine (1979) for his work on X-ray computed tomography, Max Theiler, virologist awarded the Nobel Prize in Physiology or Medicine in 1951 for developing a vaccine against yellow fever, Sir Aaron Klug, chemist and biophysicist awarded the Nobel Prize in Chemistry (1982) for his development of crystallographic electron microscopy and his structural elucidation of biologically important nucleic acid-protein complexes and professor emeritus J. M. Coetzee (Literature, 2003).

UCT alumni have gone on to achieve positions in academica, politics and other fields as follows. According to a non-peer-reviewed study conducted by the Mail & Guardian in 2018, 6% of members of the Parliament of South Africa obtained a degree from UCT (the study had a sample of 247 out of 449 MPs).

Ministers of the Cabinet of South Africa, Naledi Pandor and Ebrahim Patel, former Vice President of the World Bank and former Vice Chancellor of UCT, Mamphela Ramphele, South African surgeon Christiaan Barnard, South African writer Breyten Breytenbach, South African entrepreneur and inventor behind Ubuntu, Mark Shuttleworth, South African activist and judge Albie Sachs, former member of the South African music band Freshlyground, Zolani Mahola, South African cartoonist Zapiro and former Speaker of the National Assembly of South Africa, Baleka Mbete are among the alumni of the university. Kindly refer to List of Notable Alumni of the University of Cape Town for further information on notable UCT alumni.

The National Research Foundation of South Africa rates researchers and academics according to the quality of their research output in four categories. As of 2019, 35 staff are A-rated, that being they are internationally recognised leaders in their fields. These are 30% of the A-rated researchers recognised by the NRF, making UCT, by far, the university with the highest number of such researchers.

6 researchers are recognised as P-rated, that being they have potential to become leaders in their fields. As of 2019, 15% of South Africa's total NRF-rated researchers (about 524) are employed or associated with UCT. For a comprehensive and up-to-date list of B, Y and C-rated researchers, see this site.

As of 2019, 19% of South African Research Chairs (about 42 academics) are held by UCT employed or associated researchers. 88 members of faculty are members of the Academy of Sciences of South Africa. Notable staff members include Minister of Trade and Industry, Ebrahim Patel, Minister of International Relations and Cooperation, Naledi Pandor, former Premier of the Western Cape, Helen Zille and George Ellis, collaborator with Stephen Hawking and winner of the 2004 Templeton Prize, was a professor of applied mathematics in the Faculty of Sciences.

For a larger albeit inexhaustive list of former and current notable UCT faculty and staff, see the List of University of Cape Town faculty. Jerry Ikechukwu Igwilo impact of information and communication technology adoption on stock market development in Africa.

== Notable research ==
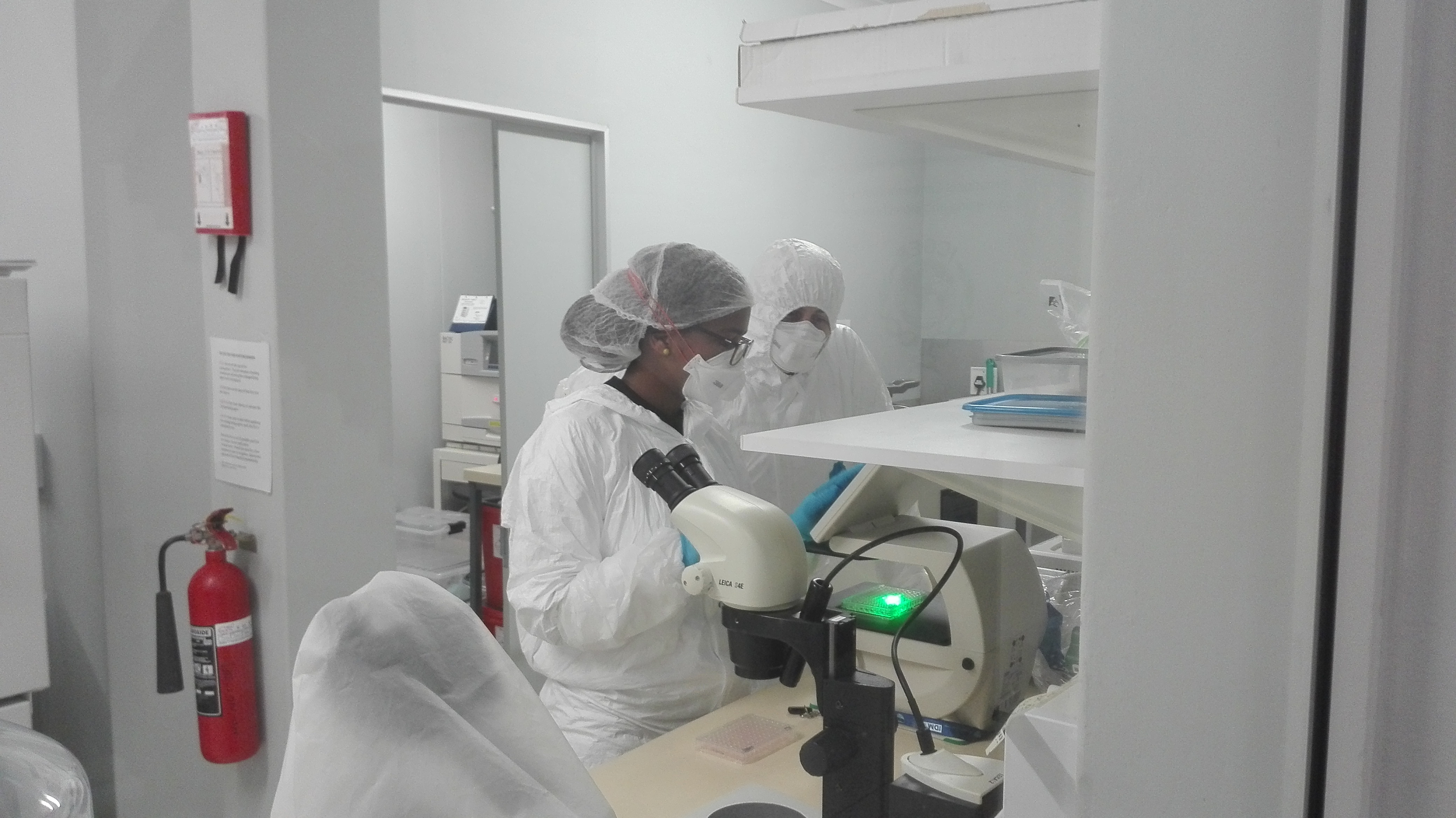
Tuberculosis researchers working in a Bio-safety Level 3 Lab at the University of Cape Town. The Institute of Infectious Disease is noted for its work on this disease.

- The Department of Mathematics and Applied Mathematics is an international centre for research in the fields of cosmology and topology.
- The Centre for Rhetoric Studies, the only one of its kind on the African Continent (director: Philippe-Joseph Salazar).
- The Department of Physics is home to the UCT-CERN research centre, which is partially responsible for the software design of the High Level Trigger component of the ALICE experiment at the Large Hadron Collider, as well as other activities related to ALICE.
- The Department of Electrical Engineering is involved in the development of technology for the Karoo Array Telescope (KAT). KAT is a precursor to the Square Kilometer Array, a proposed International project to build the world's largest radio telescope by 2020. Research groups in RF design and digital design contribute to the RF front-end and digital back-end of the KAT project.
- The Institute of Infectious Disease and Molecular Medicine (IIDMM) is engaged in research on candidate tuberculosis vaccines, and is developing candidate HIV vaccines matched to the South African epidemic.
- The OpenUCT Initiative is funded by the Andrew W. Mellon Foundation and works to make UCT's research, teaching and learning materials openly available online. Major research projects include the African Climate Development Initiative (ACDI) pilot curation project, Digital Scholarship in Emerging Knowledge Domains and Open Data in the Governance of South African Higher Education and Scholarly Communication in Africa (SCAP)
- The Department of Archaeology has found some of the oldest evidence of art and abstract thought in the world. Specifically, engrained ostrich eggshell water containers dated to 60,000 years ago
- The African Centre for Cities is one of the few research organisations focusing on urbanism in Africa.
- On 21 September 2020 the new Khoi and San Centre was launched, with an undergraduate degree programme planned to be rolled out in coming years. The centre will support and consolidate this collaborative work on research commissions on language (including Khoekhoegowab), sacred human remains, land and gender.

== Controversies ==
=== The "Mafeje Affair" ===
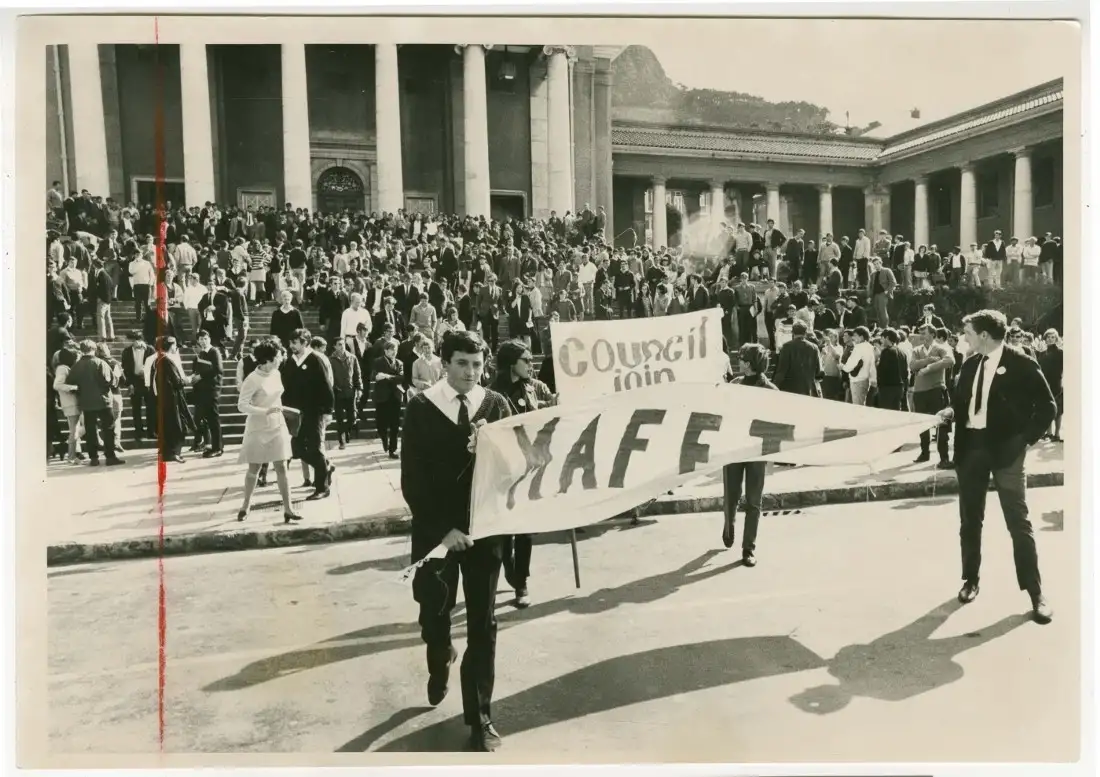
UCT's students surrounding Jameson hall (today Sarah Baartman Hall) on 15 August 1968

University of Cape Town Council's decision to rescind Archie Mafeje's (black) offer for a senior lecturer position due to pressure from the Apartheid government angered students and led to protests on 15 August 1968 followed by a nine days sit-in at UCT administration building. Protesters faced intimidation from the government, anti-protestors and fellow Afrikaans students from other universities. The police swiftly squashed support for the sit-in. In the aftermath, Mafeje left the country and did not return until 2000.

=== Rhodes Must Fall ===
A debate at UCT over the removal of a statue of Cecil Rhodes spawned Rhodes Must Fall movement. The FeesMustFall movement, which began at Wits and spread to UCT, was inspired by the Rhodes Must Fall protests.

=== Destruction and censorship of art ===
Since the removal of the Rhodes statue, other art has been removed or destroyed. FeesMustFall students burned 23 of the university's historical paintings in February 2016.

According to GroundUp, art experts connected to the university are concerned about intolerance towards art at the institution, as UCT has removed and censored 75 further "vulnerable" art which it claims are offensive to students.

An Artworks Task Team was set up in September 2015 to assess art at the university "with a view to transformation and inclusivity", and went about finding "artworks on campus that may be seen to recognize or celebrate colonial oppressors and/or which may be offensive or controversial", and specifically artworks deemed to be "offensive" in their depiction of black people.

Both Stanley Pinker's Decline and Fall, which makes ironic use of colonial iconology, and Breyten Breytenbach's Hovering Dog, which shows a black person wearing a white mask and a white person wearing a black mask, were removed; and Diane Victor's Pasiphaë, which depicts black farmers with allusions to Greek mythology, was covered by a wooden panel. In response, Breyten Breytenbach remarked that UCT were making fools of themselves, while Diane Victor thought UCT's actions were "slightly comical" and her artwork was being understood on a "simplistic level".

Jacques Rousseau, then chair of the Academic Freedom Committee, told GroundUp: "There are a number of artworks in UCT's collection that could legitimately be regarded as problematic. Even so, any piece of art is potentially offensive to someone, and the very point of art is to provoke reflection and sometimes discomfort." The Academic Freedom Committee noted with "grave concern recent instances of threats to academic freedom".

The South African Human Rights Commission was investigating the matter as of May 2017, in order to determine whether the university was infringing on the constitutional right to freedom of expression, in particular the right to artistic creativity.

== Popular culture ==
The university was the shooting location of the 2019 film Critters Attack! where it was called Leroy College and the 2008 film Disgrace.

The university was the shooting location of Netflix movies The Kissing Booth and The Kissing Booth 2 and the 2020 Netflix series Blood & Water. The Upper Campus residence served as the grounds and building for the show's fictional Parkhurst College.

== Gallery ==
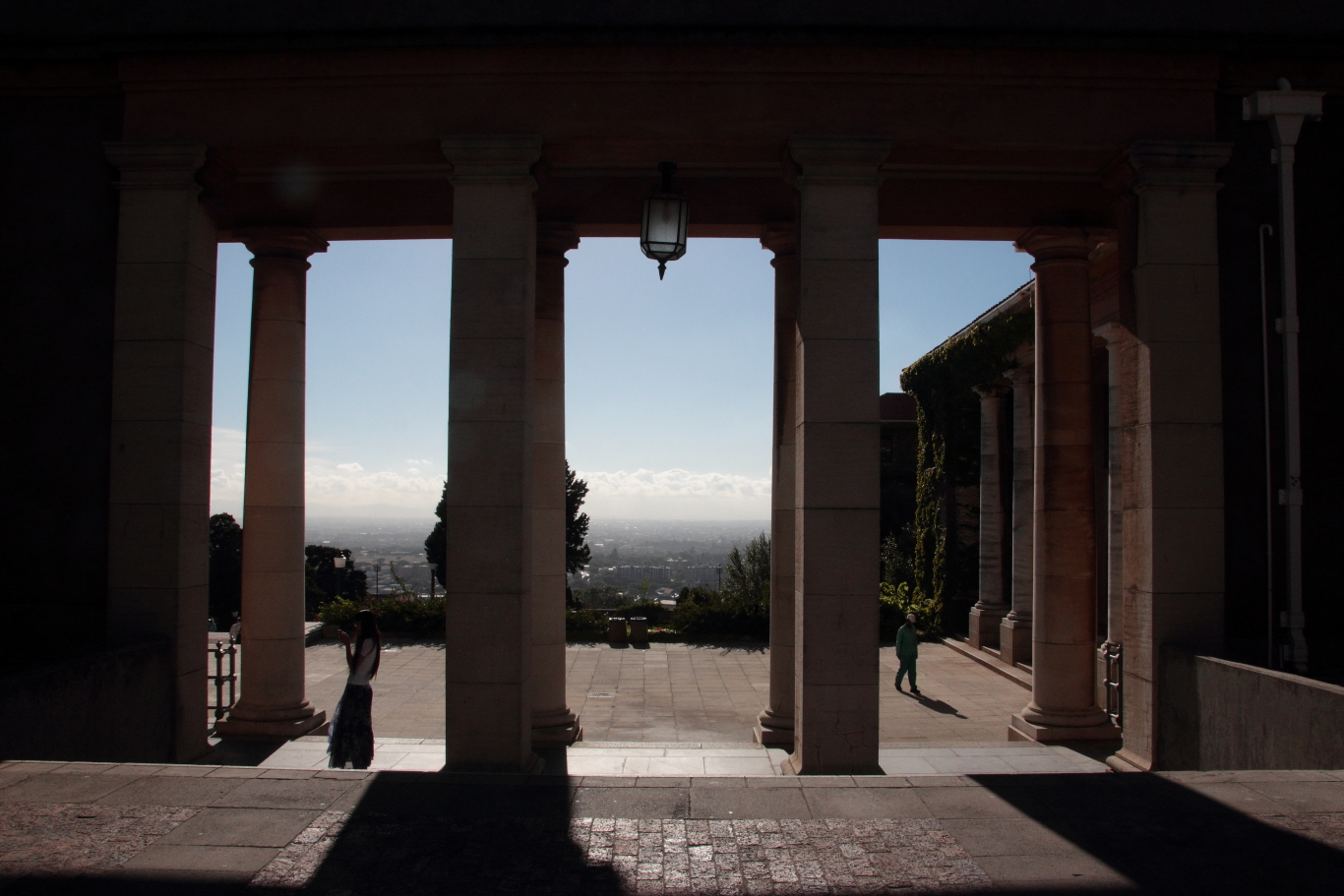
Memorial Plaza on Upper Campus viewed from the columns of the Sarah Baartman Hall

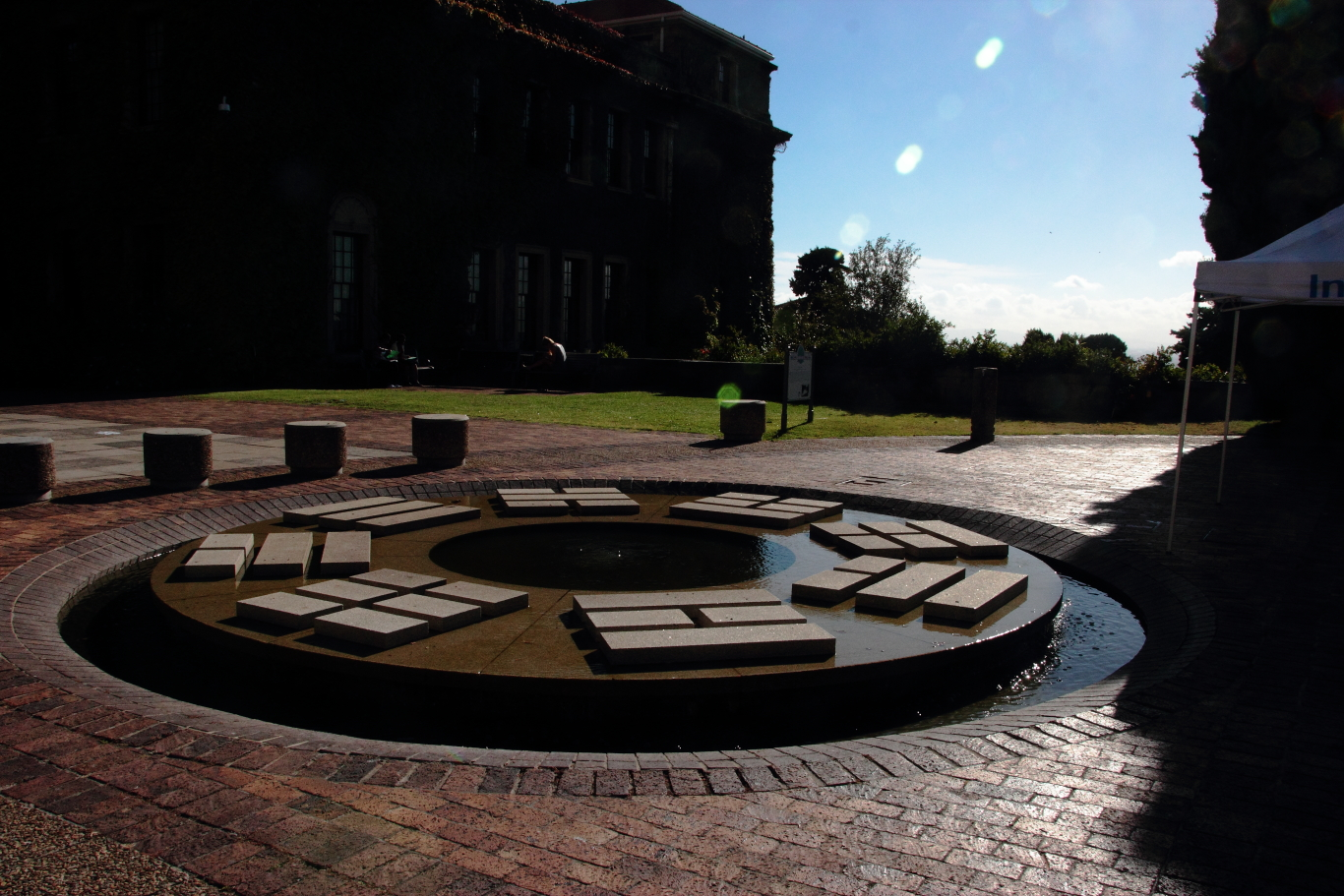
The Oracle Fountain next to the Department of Mathematics Building; inspired by the I Ching trigrams on the Taoist sun disc

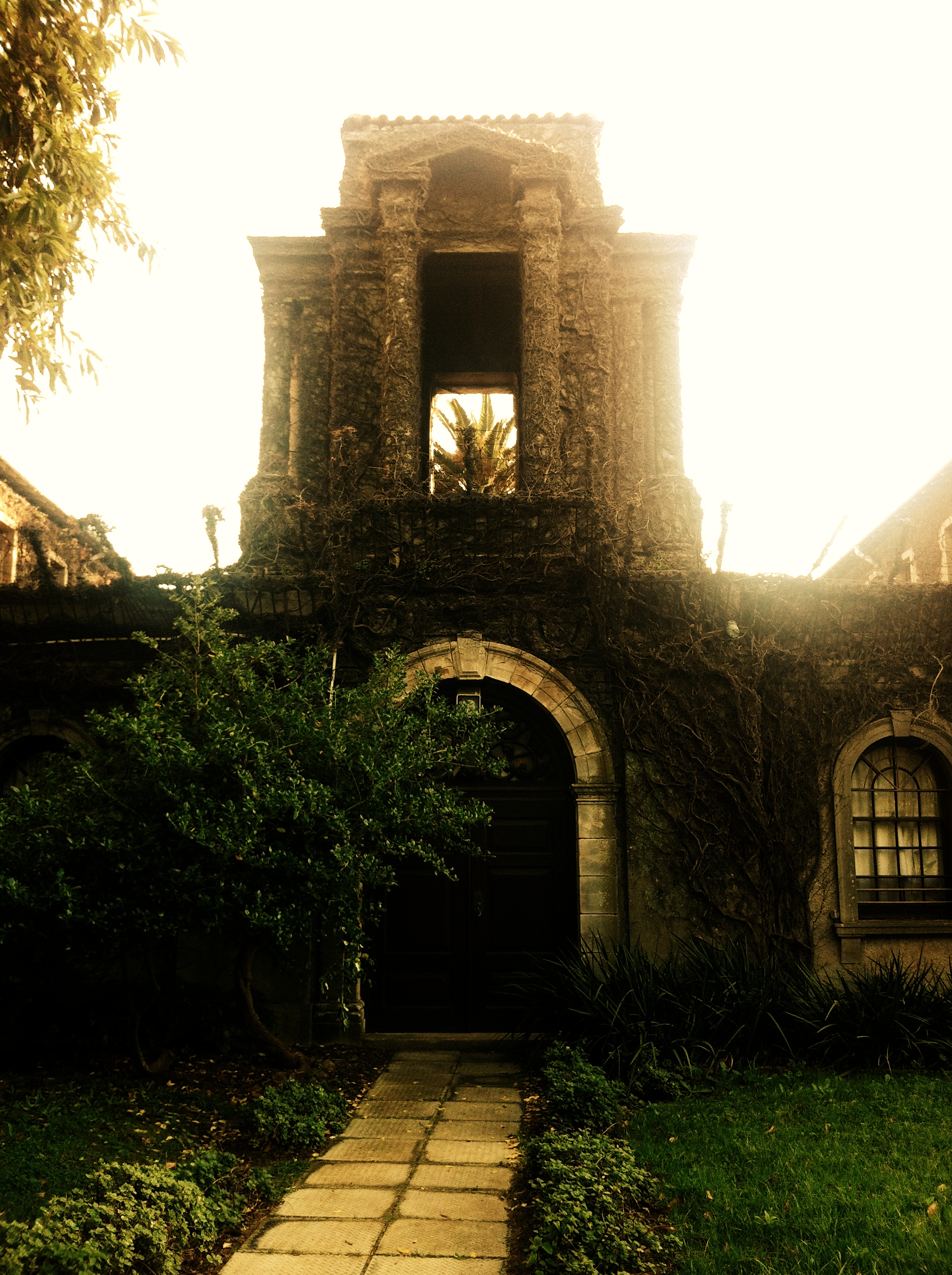
Fuller Hall, a student residence on Upper Campus built in 1928

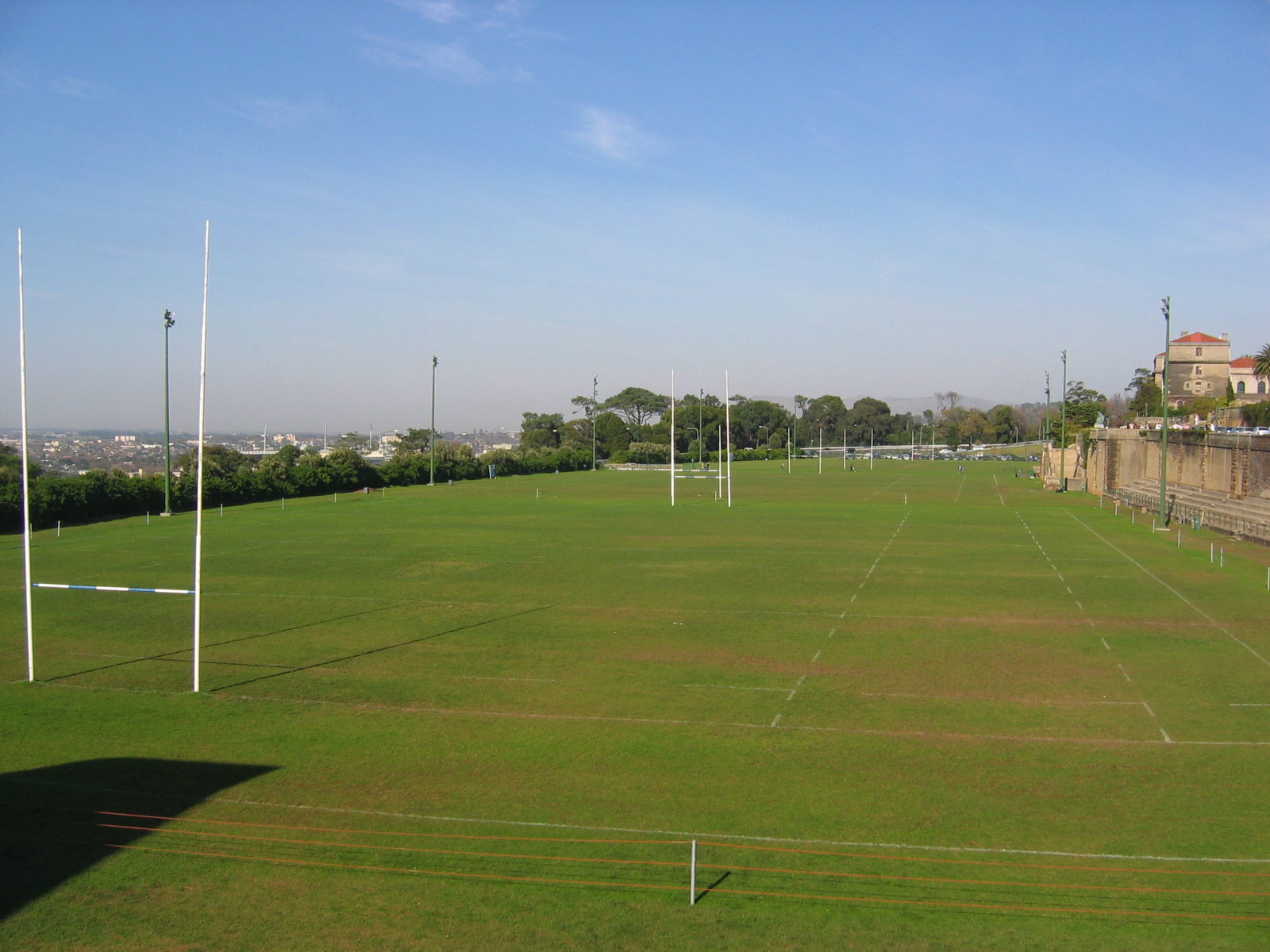
The rugby fields that separate the Upper Campus and Middle Campus

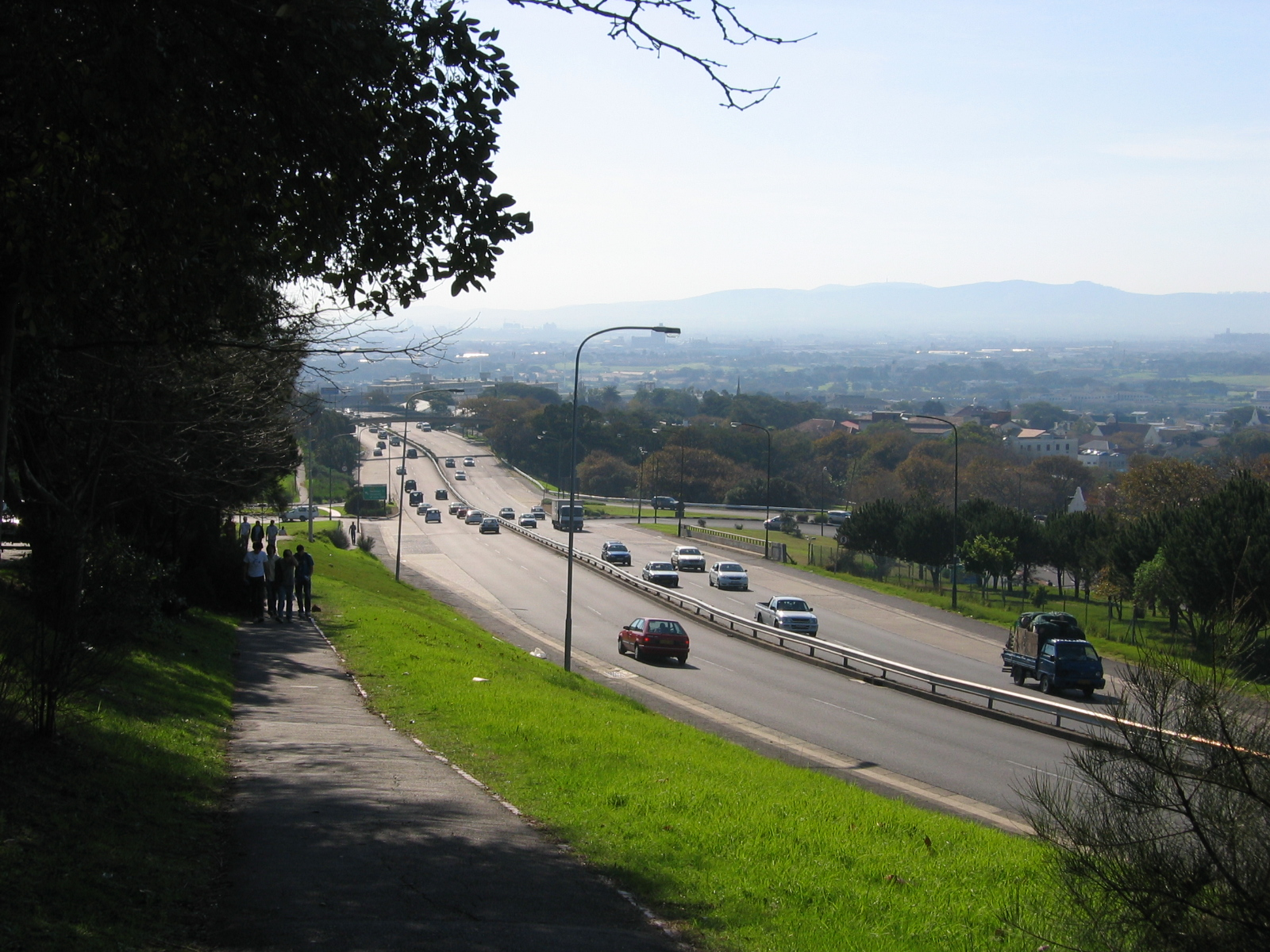
The M3 highway that separates the Upper Campus and Middle Campus; a tunnel beneath the highway connects the two campuses.

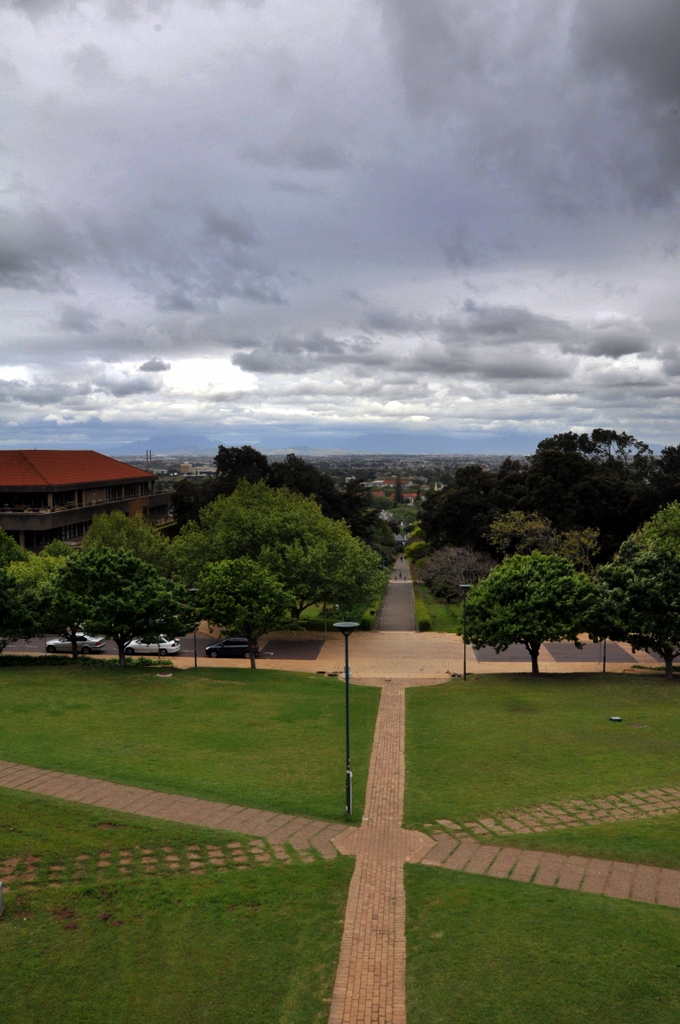
The Japonica Walk, a footpath connecting the Upper, Middle and Lower Campuses; it is lined with various flora, including japonica flowers and oak trees.

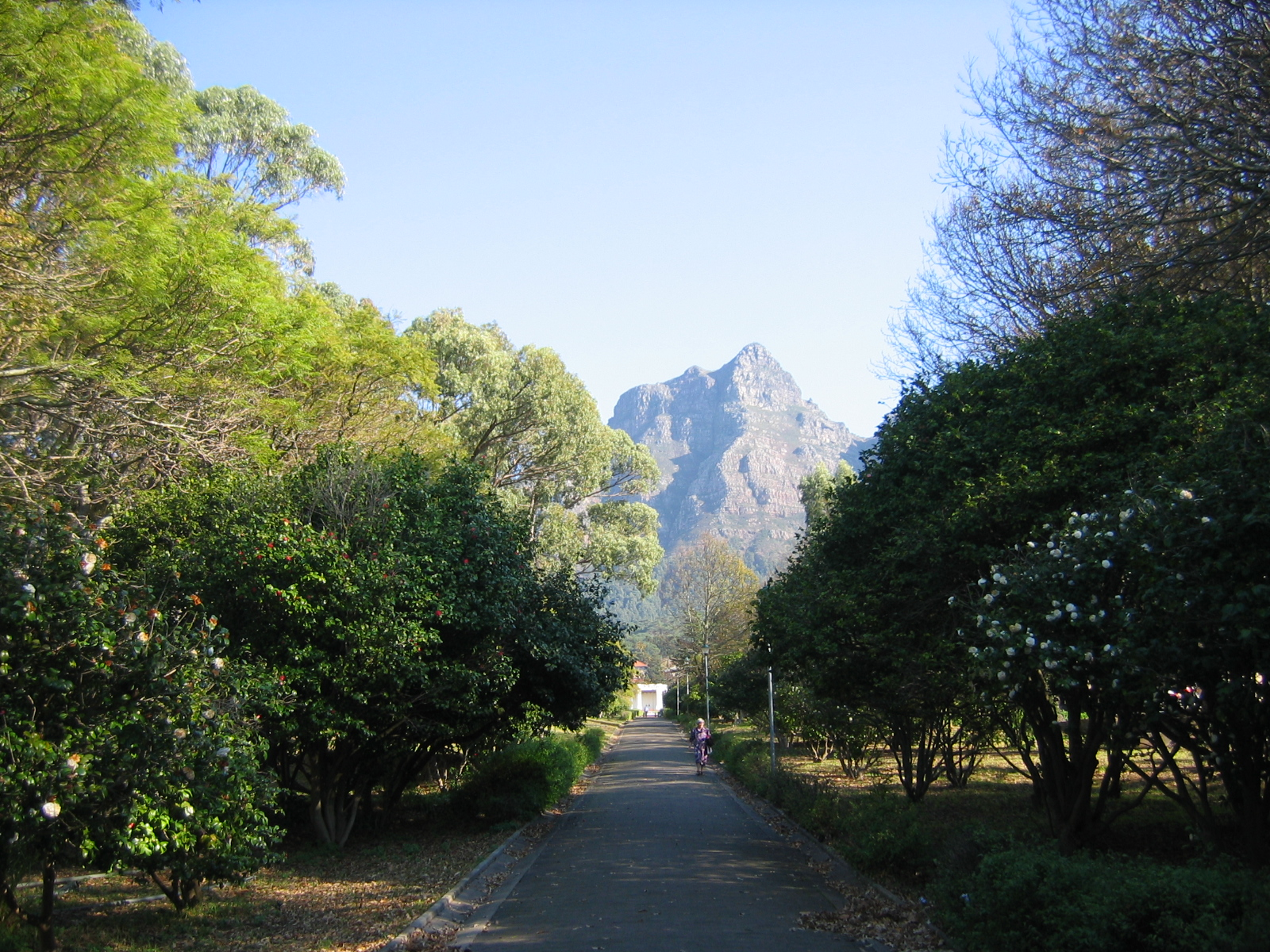
The Japonica Walk, looking towards the Summer House Pavilion

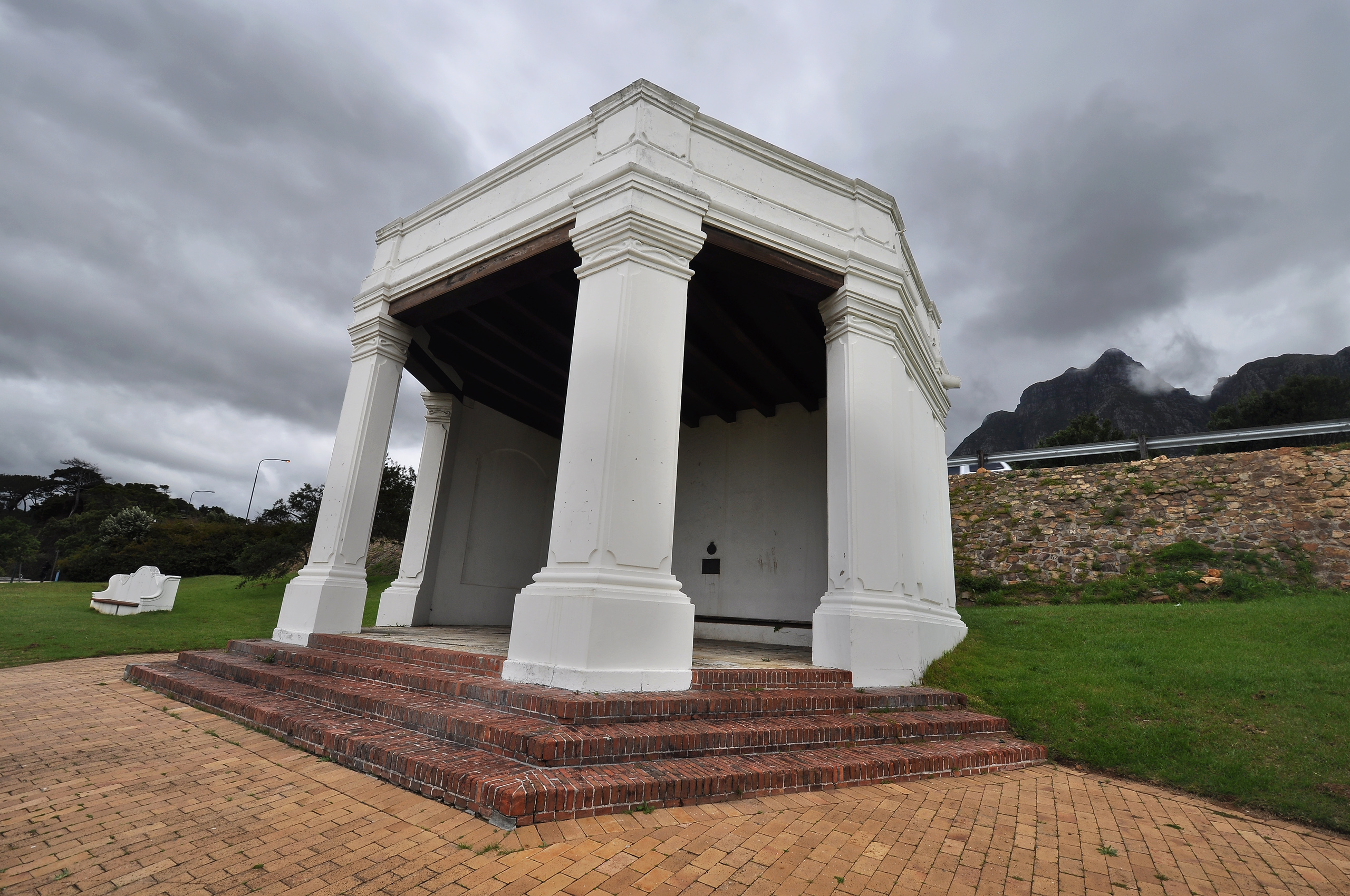
The Summer House Pavilion, built c. 1760, is one of the oldest buildings in South Africa.

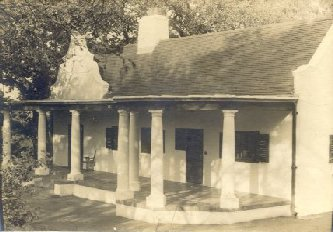
The Woolsack Building; it was a refuge for writers and artists, and also where Rudyard Kipling spent his summers between 1900 and 1908.

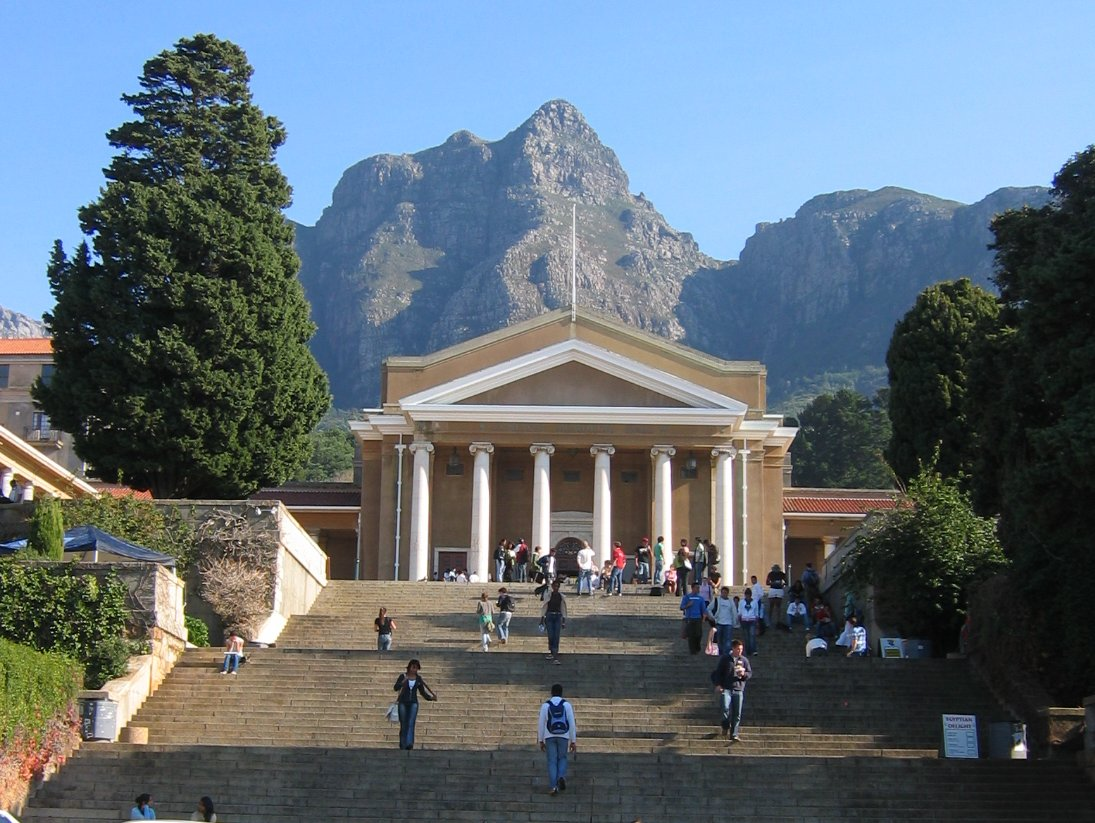
The famous steps on Upper Campus leading up to the Sarah Baartman Hall, nicknamed the "Jammie steps" (after the former Jameson Hall name)

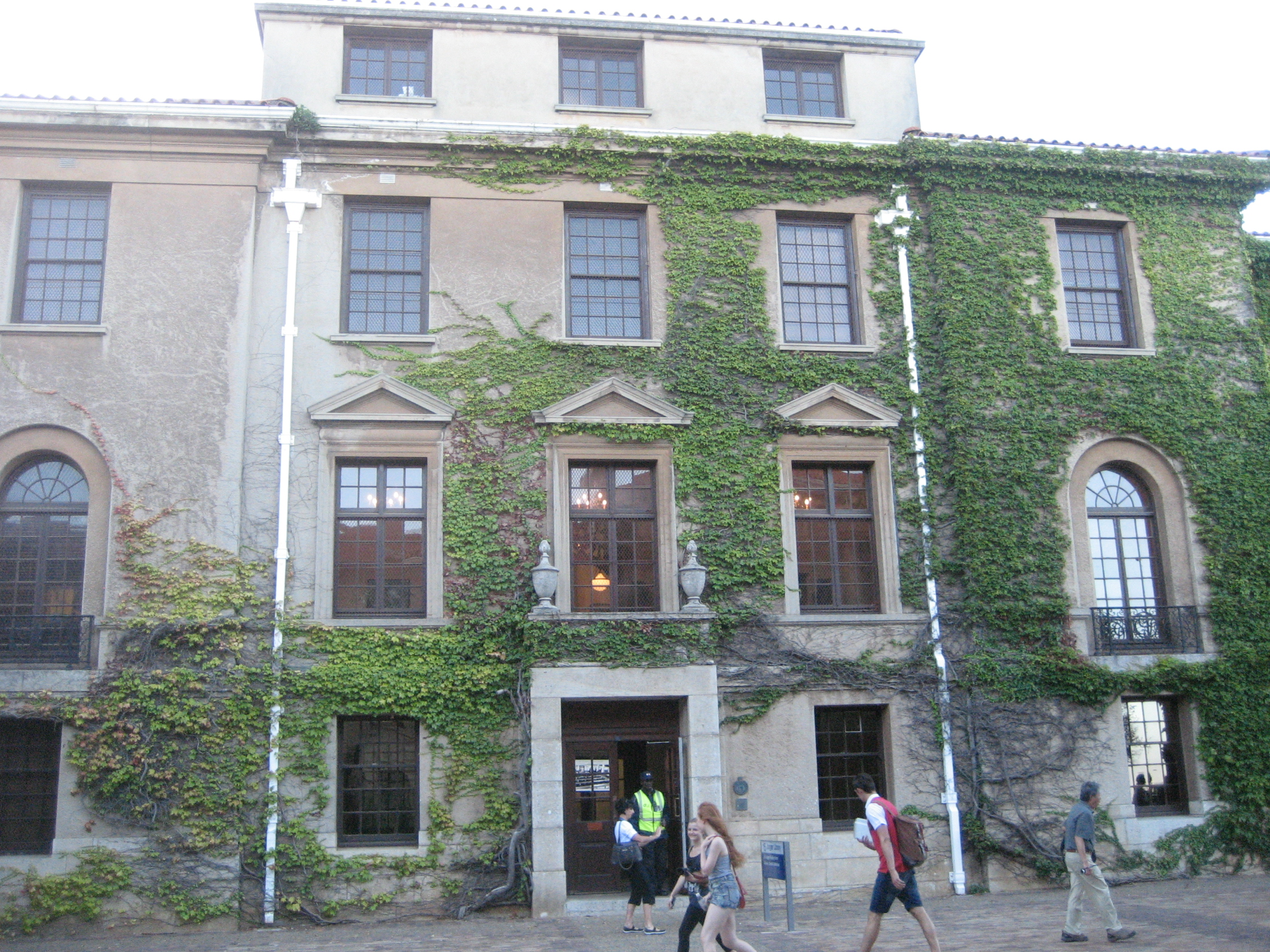
The Jagger Library, housing rare books and special collections

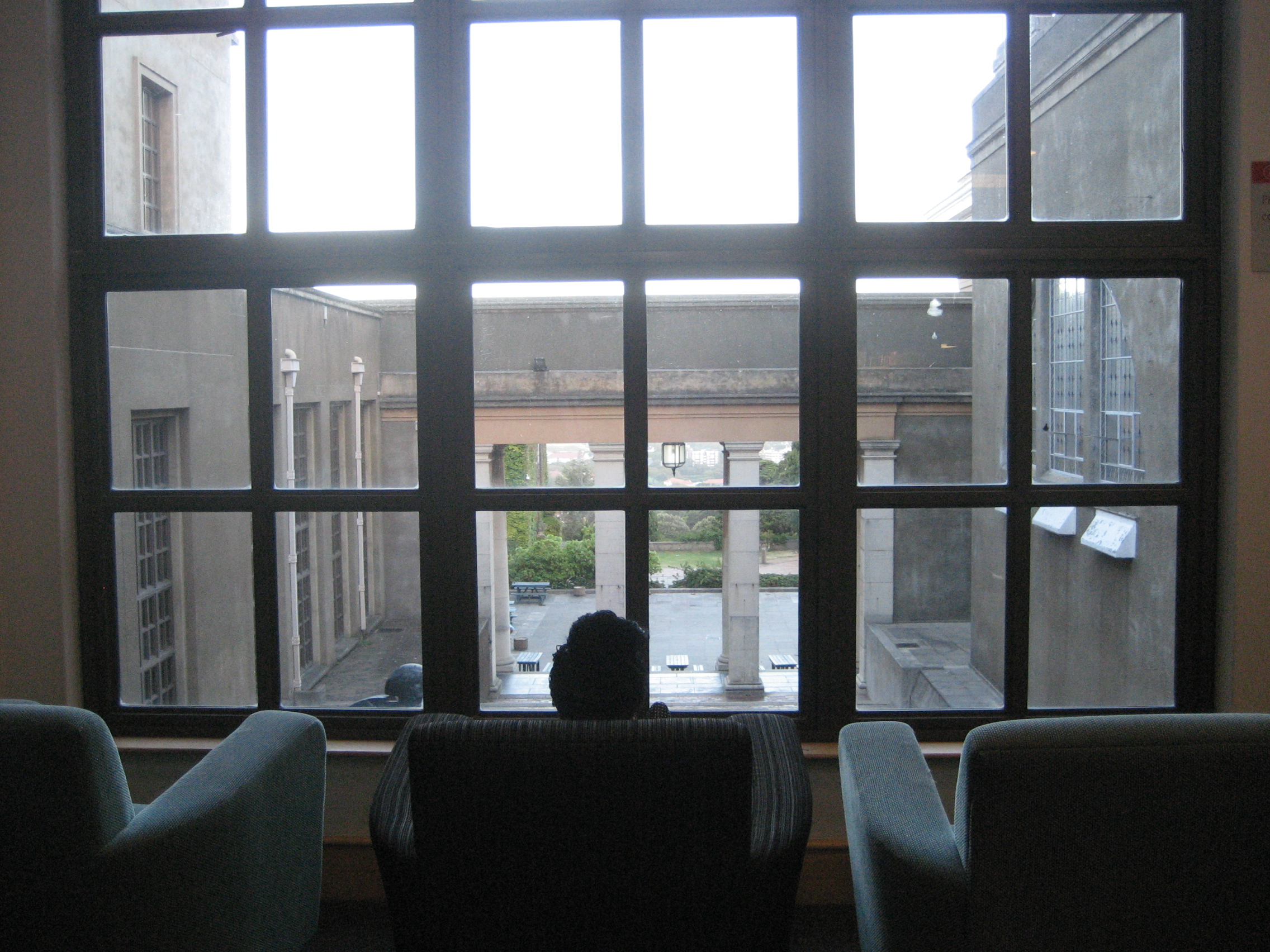
View from the Chancellor Oppenheimer Library

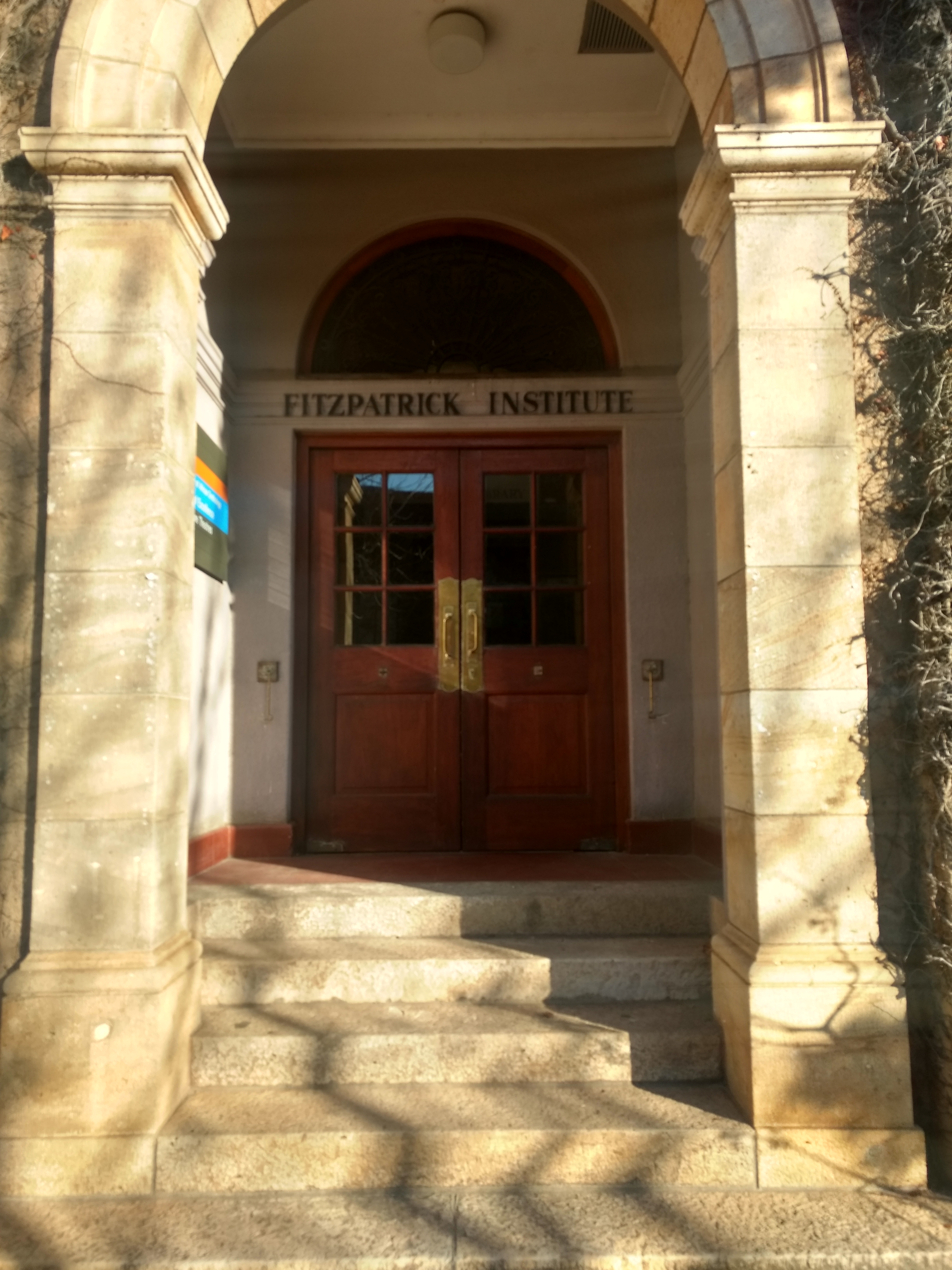
Entrance to the FitzPatrick Institute of African Ornithology

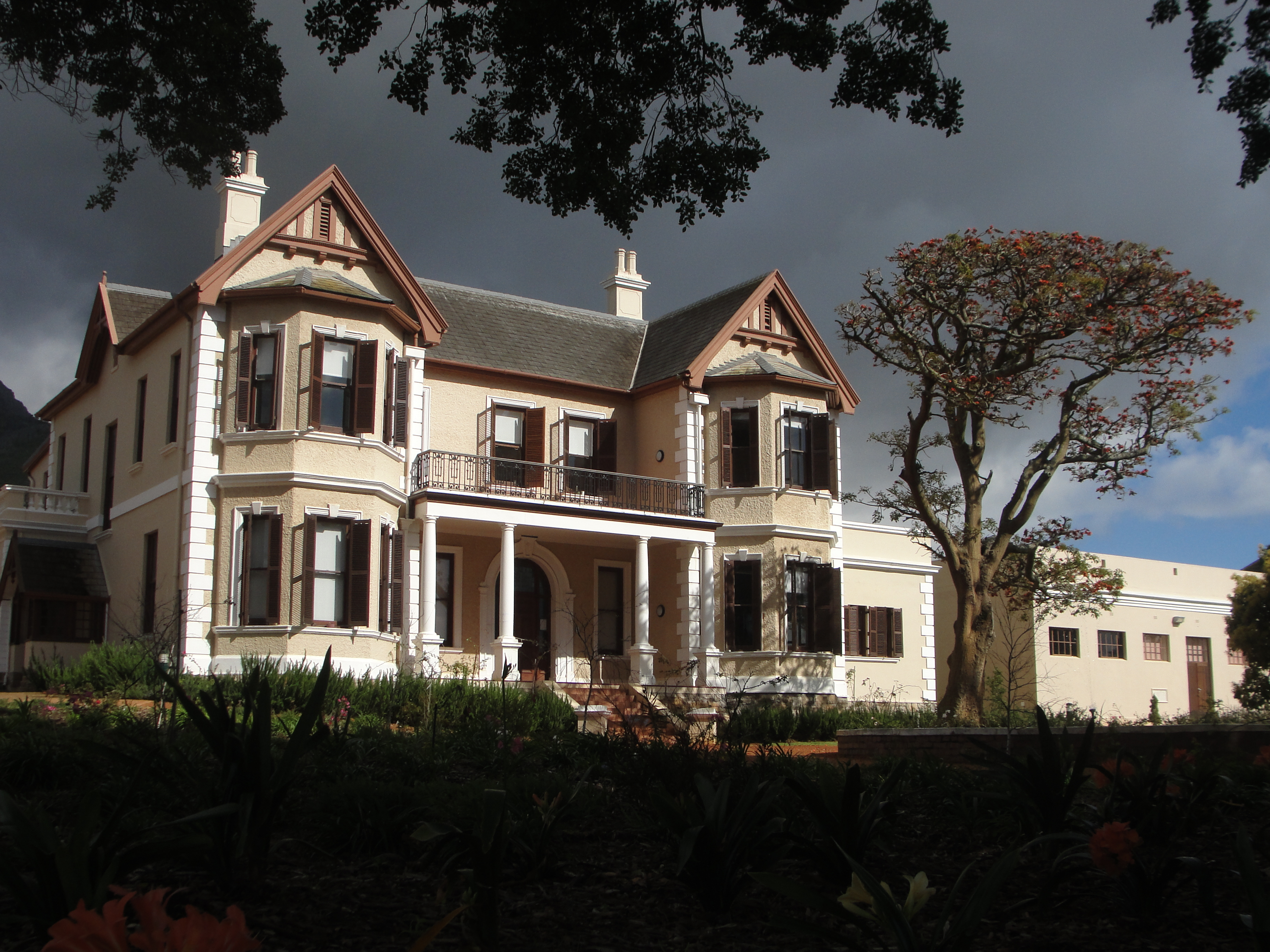
Student Housing and Residence Life Building

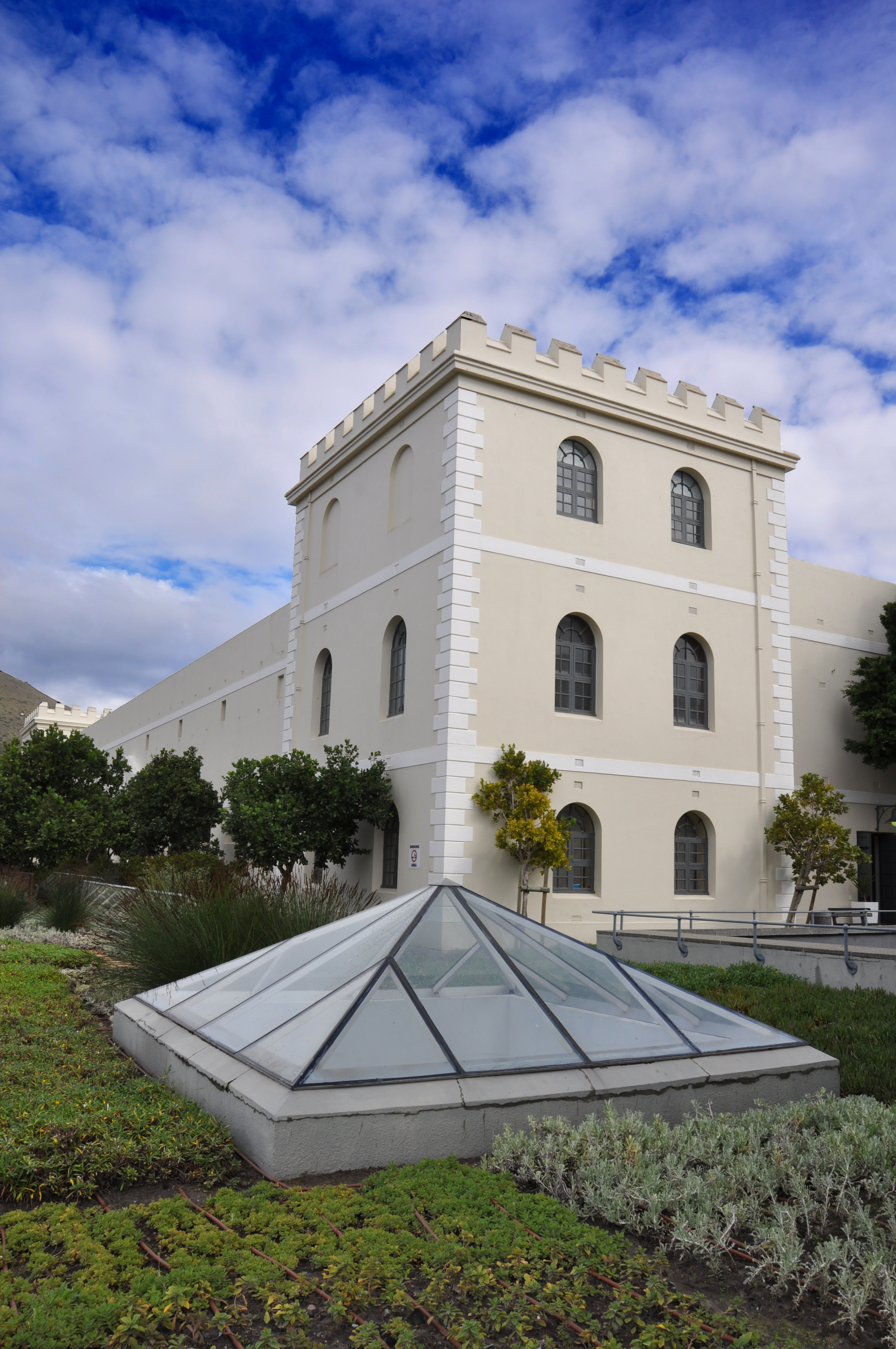
The Breakwater Lodge, which houses the UCT Graduate School of Business

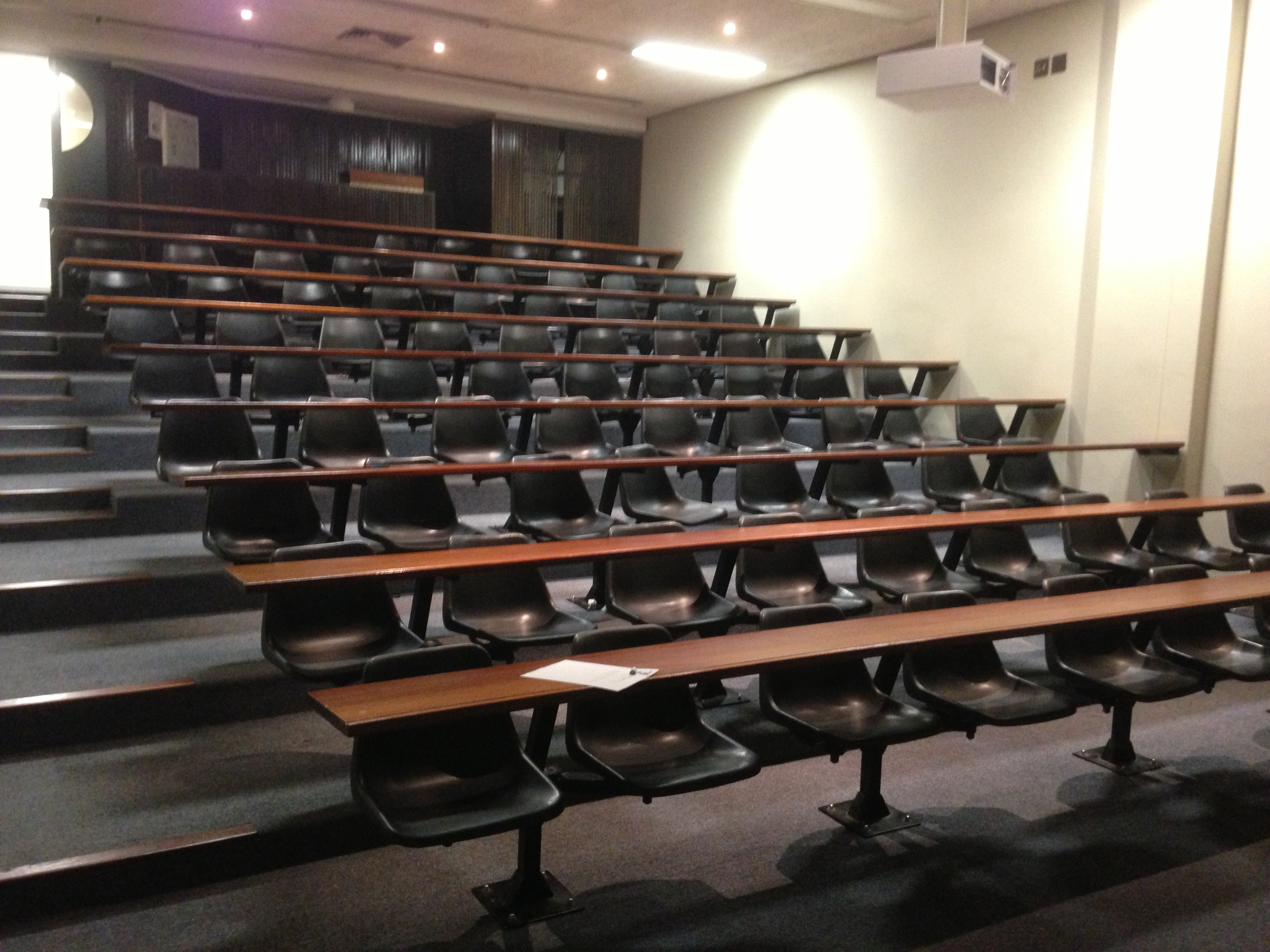
A lecture theatre in the Leslie Social Science Building (Faculty of Humanities)

== See also ==
- Centre for Curating the Archive
- List of universities in South Africa
- Education in South Africa
- Chancellor of the University of Cape Town
- Open access in South Africa and List of South African open access repositories
- List of demonstrations at the University of Cape Town
- University of Pretoria
- University of Port Elizabeth
