= Eastwood =

Eastwood may refer to:

== Businesses ==
- EastwoodCo, an automotive restoration retailer
- Eastwood Guitars, a guitar manufacturer

== Places ==
=== Australia ===
- Eastwood, New South Wales
  - Eastwood railway station
  - Electoral district of Eastwood
- Eastwood, South Australia

=== Canada ===
- Eastwood, Ontario
- Eastwood, Edmonton, Alberta, a neighborhood

=== United Kingdom ===
==== England ====
- Eastwood, Essex
- Eastwood, Herefordshire
- Eastwood, Nottinghamshire
- Eastwood, West Yorkshire
  - Eastwood (L&Y) railway station

==== Scotland ====
- Eastwood, Strathclyde, historic local government district
- Eastwood (parish)
- Eastwood (UK Parliament constituency), a former constituency
- Eastwood (Scottish Parliament constituency), a constituency of the Scottish Parliament
- Eastwood, Glasgow, neighbourhood

=== United States ===
==== Settlements ====
- Eastwood, California
- Eastwood, Florida
- Eastwood, Louisiana
- Eastwood, Michigan
- Eastwood, Missouri
- Eastwood, New Jersey, a borough between 1894 and 1896
- Eastwood, Ohio

==== Neighborhoods ====
- Eastwood, Louisville, Kentucky
- Eastwood, Syracuse, New York
- Eastwood, Dallas, Texas
- Eastwood, Houston, Texas

=== Elsewhere ===
- Eastwood, Pretoria, a suburb in South Africa
- Eastwood City, Philippines

== Other uses ==
- Eastwood (surname), people so named
- Eastwood School (disambiguation)
- Eastwood (album), 2003, by Cuban Boys
- East Wood affair, a 1993 piracy incident
