= Eastwood School =

Eastwood School may refer to:

- Eastwood Elementary School (disambiguation), various schools
- Eastwood High School (Texas), El Paso, Texas, United States
- Eastwood High School, Newton Mearns, East Renfrewshire, Scotland
- Eastwood High School (Ohio), Pemberville, Ohio, United States
- Eastwood International School Beirut, Lebanon
- Eastwood School, now Lantrip Elementary School, Houston, Texas
- The Eastwood School, now The Eastwood Academy, Essex, England

== See also ==
- Eastwood Academy, Houston, Texas
- The Eastwood Academy, Essex, England
- Eastwood College, Lebanon
- Eastwood Collegiate Institute, Kitchener, Ontario
- Eastwood Local School District, Ohio
- East Woods School, Oyster Bay Cove, New York
- Eastwood (disambiguation)
