= Mosa Moshabela =

Vice-Chancellor of the University of Cape Town

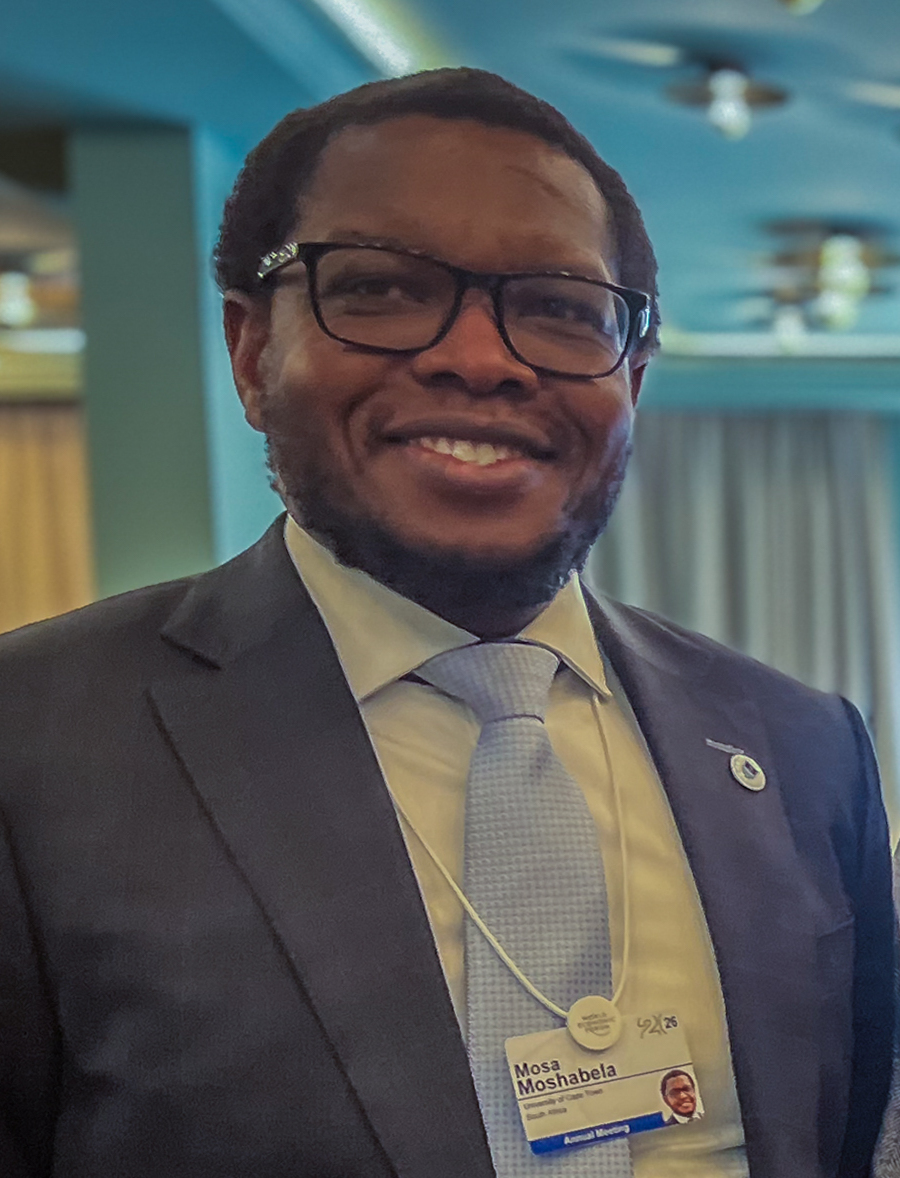
- Moshabela in 2026

Vice-Chancellor of the University of Cape Town
- Incumbent
- Assumed office 1 August 2024
- Chancellor: Precious Moloi-Motsepe
- Preceded by: Daya Reddy; Mamokgethi Phakeng

Personal details
- Born: 23 September 1979 (age 47) Mapatjakeng, Zebediela
- Spouse: Dr Nosipho Makhakhe
- Parent(s): Ngwako Moshabela and Esther Madisha
- Education: University of KwaZulu-Natal; University of Limpopo; University of the Witwatersrand; London School of Hygiene and Tropical Medicine

Academic background
- Thesis: Understanding patterns of health system utilisation among people living with HIV/Aids attending rural HIV services (2012)

Matlagolo Mosa Moshabela is a South African medical doctor, public health researcher and the Vice-Chancellor of the University of Cape Town, having taken office on 1 August 2024 following the interim tenure of Daya Reddy.

== Early life and education ==
Mosa Moshabela was born and raised in South Africa. He pursued his medical degree at the University of KwaZulu-Natal. Following his undergraduate studies, Moshabela completed training in family medicine at MEDUNSA and subsequently earned a PhD in Public Health from the University of the Witwatersrand. He obtained a master's degree in Demography and Health from the London School of Hygiene and Tropical Medicine.

== Career ==
=== Academic positions ===
Moshabela has held various academic positions throughout his career. These include serving as dean of the School of Nursing and Public Health at the University of KwaZulu-Natal and subsequently deputy vice-chancellor for research and innovation. His academic work concerns healthcare delivery and the social determinants of health, particularly in sub-Saharan Africa.

In 2026, Moshabela initiated legal proceedings challenging resolutions adopted by the University of Cape Town Council following an investigation into complaints concerning his conduct; the council had decided not to institute disciplinary proceedings in relation to those complaints. Subsequent reporting stated that former university staff members identified in connection with complaints denied having made them.

=== Research and contributions ===
Mosa Moshabela's research covers areas of public health, including HIV/AIDS, tuberculosis, and healthcare delivery in resource-limited settings. He has led and participated in research projects concerning these diseases. His work often involves interdisciplinary approaches, combining insights from medicine, public health, and social sciences.

Moshabela has published in peer-reviewed journals and has presented his research findings at various international conferences. His research concerns health policy and practice in South Africa and elsewhere in Africa.

=== Leadership and advocacy ===
In addition to his academic and research roles, Moshabela has been involved in health advocacy and has served on professional and research bodies. He is the chairperson of the National Research Foundation Board. He is a member of the Academy of Science of South Africa.

=== Honors and awards ===
Moshabela has received awards for his work in public health and medical research.

== Selected publications ==
- Croke, K., Moshabela, M., Kapoor, N.R., Doubova, S.V., Garcia-Elorrio, E., HaileMariam, D., Lewis, T.P., Mfeka-Nkabinde, G.N., Mohan, S., Mugo, P. and Nzinga, J., 2024. Primary health care in practice: usual source of care and health system performance across 14 countries. The Lancet Global Health, 12(1), pp.e134-e144. https://www.thelancet.com/journals/langlo/article/PIIS2214-109X(23)00513-2/fulltext
- Sandile Cele; Laurelle Jackson; David S Khoury; et al. (2022). "Omicron extensively but incompletely escapes Pfizer BNT162b2 neutralization". Nature. 602 (7898): 654–656. Bibcode:2022Natur.602..654C. doi:10.1038/s41586-021-04387-1. PMC 8866126. PMID 35016196. Wikidata Q112052343.
- Mosa Moshabela; Dominic Bukenya; Gabriel Darong; et al. (2017). "Traditional healers, faith healers and medical practitioners: the contribution of medical pluralism to bottlenecks along the cascade of care for HIV/AIDS in Eastern and Southern Africa". Sexually Transmitted Infections. 93 (Suppl 3). doi:10.1136/sextrans-2016-052974. PMC 5739844. PMID 28736393. Wikidata Q38557151.
- Jonathan E Golub; Paul Pronyk; Lerato Mohapi; et al. (2009). "Isoniazid preventive therapy, HAART and tuberculosis risk in HIV-infected adults in South Africa: a prospective cohort". AIDS. 23 (5): 631–636. doi:10.1097/qad.0b013e328327964f. PMC 3063949. PMID 19525621. Wikidata Q34717889.

Academic offices
Preceded by Mamokgethi Phakeng	Vice-Chancellor of the University of Cape Town; 2024–present	Incumbent
