= Academic tenure =

Indefinite academic appointment

Tenure is a type of academic appointment that offers its holder a semi-permanent position at an institution, protecting them from being fired or laid off for their personal beliefs and practices. Academic tenure originated in the United States in the early 20th century, and several other countries have since adopted it. Tenure is a means of defending the principle of academic freedom, though tenured staff can still be fired under just cause laws or under extraordinary circumstances such as financial exigency or program discontinuation.

== History ==
Tenure was introduced into American universities in the early 1900s in part to prevent the arbitrary dismissal of faculty members who expressed unpopular views.

Before Nazism, Germany had been a leader in academic tenure, but free speech and tenure were severely curtailed under the Third Reich. Adolf Hitler called universal education "the most corroding and disintegrating poison". He appointed Education Minister Bernhard Rust, to ensure Nazi racial theories were integrated in university curriculums. This caused a purge of 1500 professors, and by 1939, nearly half of all faculty posts were occupied by Nazis.

In the late 1940s, the University of Illinois Urbana-Champaign fired several untenured economists, all of whom subsequently had distinguished careers, for teaching the "heresy" Keynesian economics.

== By country ==
=== Denmark ===
Danish universities in advertisements for faculty positions usually state that professor positions are tenured. What that means has been a matter of controversy.

Denmark adopted a more hierarchical management approach for universities in the early 2000s. This new system was introduced by parliament on a proposal by the Minister of Science, Technology and Development, Helge Sander, based on his vision that Danish universities should compete for funding in order to increase their attention to marketing and industry.

The controversial understanding of tenure in Denmark was demonstrated by the University of Copenhagen in 2016 when it fired Professor Hans Thybo for what it regarded as unacceptable behavior: putting pressure on a postdoctoral associate of his about an employment survey and using private email for work-related matters despite repeated warnings. Thybo disputed the causes of his firing, and the postdoc said that he did not feel pressured. The handling of the firing was criticized by other researchers. A later court decision ruled that the dismissal had not followed the collective agreements and Thybo received economic compensation. Thybo had insisted that he should be reinstated in his previous position, but this was not supported by the court and the university did not rehire him.

=== United Kingdom ===
The original form of academic tenure was removed in the United Kingdom in 1988 through the Education Reform Act. In its place, there is the distinction between permanent and temporary contracts for academics. A permanent lecturer in UK universities usually holds an open-ended position that covers teaching, research and administrative responsibilities.

=== Germany ===
Academics are divided into two classes: On the one hand, professors (W2/W3&C3/C4 positions in the new and old systems of pay grades) are employed as state civil servants and hold tenure as highly safeguarded lifetime employment; On the other hand, there is a much larger group of "junior staff" on fixed-term contracts, research grants, fellowships and part-time jobs. In 2010, 9% of academic staff were professors, 66% were "junior staff" (including doctoral candidates on contracts), and 25% were other academic staff in secondary employment. Permanent research, teaching and management positions below professorship as an "Akademischer Rat" (a civil service position salaried like high school teachers) have become relatively rare compared to the 1970s and 1980s and are often no longer refilled after a retirement.

In order to attain the position of professor, in some fields, an academic must usually complete a "Habilitation" (a kind of broader second PhD thesis; the very highest degree available within the university, entitling the holder to be a "full professor"), after which they are eligible for tenureship. This means that, compared to other countries, academics in Germany obtain tenure at a relatively late age, as on average one becomes an Academic Assistant at the age of 42. In 2002 the "Juniorprofessur" position (comparable to an assistant professor in the US, but not always endowed with a tenure track) was introduced as an alternative to "Habilitation". However, the degree of formal equivalence between a "Habilitation" and a successfully completed "Juniorprofessur" varies across the different states (Bundesländer), and the informal recognition of having served as a "Juniorprofessur" as a replacement for the "Habilitation" in the appointment procedures for professorships varies greatly between disciplines.

Due to a university system that guarantees universities relative academic freedom, the position of professor in Germany is relatively strong and independent. As civil servants, professors have a series of attendant rights and benefits, yet this status is subject to discussion. In the W pay scale the professorial pay is related to performance rather than merely to age, as it was in C.

=== United States and Canada ===
Under the tenure systems adopted by many universities and colleges in the United States and Canada, some faculty positions have tenure and some do not. Typical systems, such as the widely adopted "1940 Statement of Principles on Academic Freedom and Tenure" of the American Association of University Professors, allow a limited period to establish a record of published research, ability to attract grant funding, academic visibility, teaching excellence, and administrative or community service.

The 1940 AAUP statement was jointly formulated and endorsed with the American Association of Colleges and Universities (AAC&U), it is endorsed by over 250 scholarly and higher education organizations and is widely adopted into faculty handbooks and collective bargaining agreements at institutions of higher education throughout the United States. This statement holds that, "The common good depends upon the free search for truth and its free exposition" and stresses that academic freedom is essential in teaching and research in this regard.

The statement limits the number of years that any employee can remain employed as a non-tenured instructor or professor, compelling the institution to grant tenure to or terminate an individual, with significant advance notice, at the end of a specified time period. Some institutions require promotion to associate professor as a condition of tenure. A university may also offer research positions or professional track and clinical track academic positions which are said to be "non-tenure track". Positions with titles such as instructor, lecturer, adjunct professor, research professor etc. do not carry the possibility of tenure, have higher teaching loads, have less influence within the institution, lower compensation with few or no benefits and little protection of academic freedom.

In the United States, tenure rights for teachers serving in K-12 public schools also have been in existence for more than a hundred years, beginning first in New Jersey in 1909.

== Arguments in favor ==
Defenders of tenure, like Ellen Schrecker and Aeon J. Skoble, generally acknowledge flaws in how tenure approvals are currently run and problems in how tenured professors might use their time, security, and power; however, as Skoble puts it, the "downsides are either not as bad as claimed, or [are] costs outweighed by the benefits"—and he points out that the very debate about tenure in which he is engaging is made possible by the academic freedom which tenure makes possible. "Tenure remains scholars' best defense of free inquiry and heterodoxy," writes Skoble, "especially in these times of heightened polarization and internet outrage. Let us focus on fixing it, not scrapping it."

Supporters of tenure argue that the security granted by tenure is necessary to recruit talented individuals into university professorships, because in many fields private industry jobs pay significantly more; as Schrecker puts it, providing professors "the kind of job security that most other workers can only dream of" counterbalances universities' inability to compete with the private sector: "Universities, after all, are not corporations and cannot provide the kinds of financial remuneration that similarly educated individuals in other fields expect." Furthermore, Schrecker continues, because research positions require extreme specialization, they must consolidate the frequency and intensity of performance evaluations across a given career, and they cannot have the same flexibility or turnover rates as other jobs, making the tenure process a practical necessity: "A mathematician cannot teach a class on medieval Islam, nor can an art historian run an organic chemistry lab. Moreover, there is no way that the employing institution can provide the kind of retraining that would facilitate such a transformation... even the largest and most well-endowed institution lacks the resources to reevaluate and replace its medieval Islamicists and algebraic topologists every year. Tenure thus lets the academic community avoid excessive turnover while still ensuring the quality of the institution's faculty. It is structured around two assessments – one at hiring, the other some six years later – that are far more rigorous than those elsewhere in society and give the institution enough confidence in the ability of the successful candidates to retain them on a permanent basis." Tenure also locks in the non-pecuniary aspects of academic compensation, lowering the required salary.

Above all, however, tenure is essential because it protects academic freedom: not only in cases in which a scholar's politics may run counter to those of their department, institution, or funding bodies, but also and most often in cases when a scholar's work innovates in ways that challenge received wisdom in the field. As much as Ellen Schrecker identifies its flaws, she asserts tenure's crucial role in preserving academic freedom:

And yet, despite its whittling away by such unfortunate decisions as Urofsky, Garcetti, and Hong, the traditional form of academic freedom still exists, misunderstood and imperiled as it may be. It exists by virtue of two practices that protect the job security and institutional authority of college and university teachers: tenure and faculty governance. It exists as well because of the procedural guarantees that surround those practices... My own experiences prove tenure's value. As a historian who wants to conform to the highest professional standards while also trying to contribute in some way to the cause of freedom and social justice, I am viewed as a controversial figure in some circles. I would be seriously hampered in my work, however, if I was constantly worrying about losing my job because of something I wrote or said... Tenure is also the mechanism through which institutions create a protected space within which college and university teachers can exercise their craft without worrying that an unpopular or unorthodox undertaking might put their careers at risk. More concretely, it creates an economically secure cohort of senior faculty members who can (and sometimes do) defend the quality of American education as well as the ability of their colleagues to teach, do research, and speak out as citizens without fear of institutional reprisals. Such, at least, is the idealized version of the relationship between tenure and academic freedom.

In elementary and secondary schools, tenure also protects teachers from being fired for personal, political, or other non-work related reasons: tenure prohibits school districts from firing experienced teachers to hire less experienced, less expensive teachers as well as protects teachers from being fired for teaching unpopular, controversial, or otherwise challenged curricula such as evolutionary biology, theology, and controversial literature.

If the "social justice" element of Schrecker's defense makes it seem like present-day assurances of academic freedom create a politically left echo chamber in academic departments, Skoble observes that tenure thus becomes all the more necessary to preserve a diversity of ideas: "There is an orthodoxy in the academy, a well-documented leftward slant in political affiliation. To Bruce, this is an argument against tenure, but my point is that the more I am persuaded that there is groupthink orthodoxy afoot, the more I want assurances that I would not get fired if I write an essay on free trade or the Second Amendment or a book on anarchism. I take it the counterargument is that the more entrenched the orthodoxy becomes, the less likely a heterodox scholar will be tenured, or even hired, in the first place... I can see that this poses a problem but fail to see how abolishing tenure would help. As things stand, some heterodox scholars do get hired and tenured.. If only the heterodox need formal protection, and we have a problem with growing orthodoxy, then eliminating the formal protection will exacerbate the problem."

Skoble argues categorically and plainly against critics that say "tenure protects incompetent professors": "My argument is that when this happens, it is a malfunction of the system, not an intrinsic feature of its proper use. The way it is supposed to work is that incompetent professors do not get tenure in the first place. The rebuttal is 'but they do, therefore tenure is a bad idea.' But that is like arguing that because you ran a red light and caused a train wreck, driving is a bad idea."

== Arguments against ==
Some have argued that modern tenure systems diminish academic freedom, forcing those seeking tenured positions to profess conformance to the level of mediocrity as those awarding the tenured professorships. For example, according to physicist Lee Smolin, "...it is practically career suicide for a young theoretical physicist not to join the field of string theory."

Economist Steven Levitt, who recommends the elimination of tenure (for economics professors) in order to incentivize higher performance among professors, also points out that a pay increase may be required to compensate faculty members for the lost job security. Organizational theorist Russel Ackoff did not believe in it, and went as far as to deposit a signed but undated resignation letter with the Dean of the Wharton School, to be used if and when the Dean thought it could be appropriate to do so.

Some U.S. states have considered legislation to remove tenure at public universities.

A further criticism of tenure is that it rewards complacency. Once professors are awarded tenure, they may begin putting reduced effort into their job, knowing that their removal is difficult or expensive to the institution. Another criticism is that it may cause the institution to tolerate incompetent professors if they are tenured.

== See also ==
- Faculty (academic staff)
- Habilitation
- List of academic ranks
- Academic ranks (Australia and New Zealand)
