= Samuel Purchas =

English cleric and publisher (c. 1577–1626)

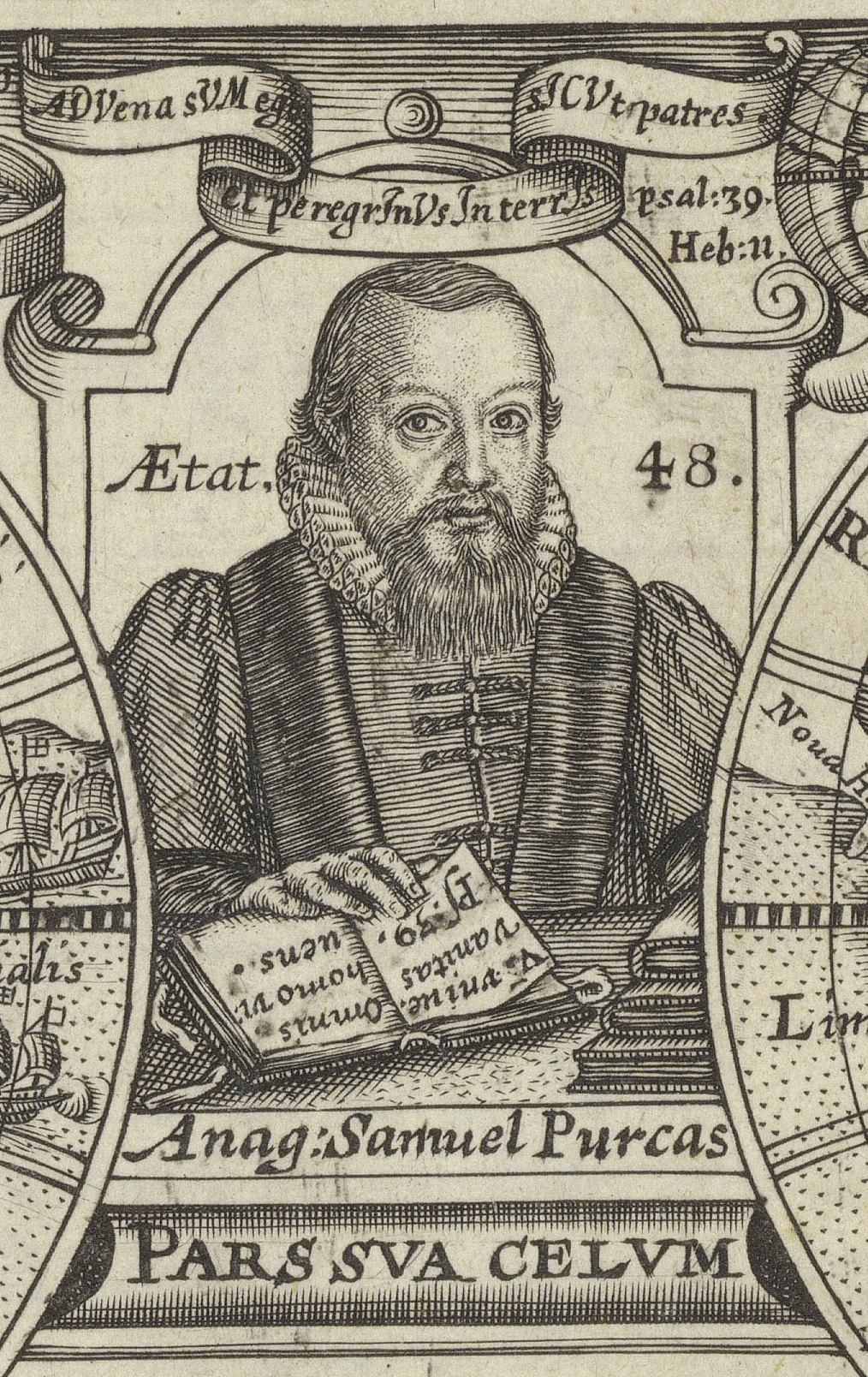
Samuel Purchas at the age of 48.

Samuel Purchas (c. 1577 – 1626) was an English Anglican cleric who published several volumes of reports by travellers to foreign countries.

== Career ==
Born in Thaxted, Essex, as the son of a yeoman, Purchas graduated from St John's College, Cambridge, in 1600. In 1604, King James I presented him to the vicarage of St. Laurence and All Saints, in Eastwood, Essex.

Eastwood is two miles from Leigh-on-Sea, at that time a prosperous shipping centre where seafarers congregated. Purchas himself never travelled "200 miles from Thaxted in Essex where I was borne". Instead, he recorded personal narratives shared with him by sailors who returned to England from their voyages. He added these accounts to a vast compilation of unsorted manuscripts that were left to him by Richard Hakluyt, which were later published as Purchas's third – and final – book.

In 1614, Purchas became chaplain to the Archbishop of Canterbury, George Abbot, and rector of St Martin, Ludgate, London. He held a Bachelor of Divinity degree, and with this degree was admitted at Oxford University in 1615.

In 1614, he published Purchas His Pilgrimage: or Relations of the World and the Religions observed in all Ages and Places discovered, from the Creation unto this Present. In this work, intended as an overview of the diversity of God's creation from an Anglican world-view, he presented several abbreviated travel stories that he would later publish in full. The book achieved immediate popularity and went through four editions between 1613 and 1626, the year of Purchas's death.

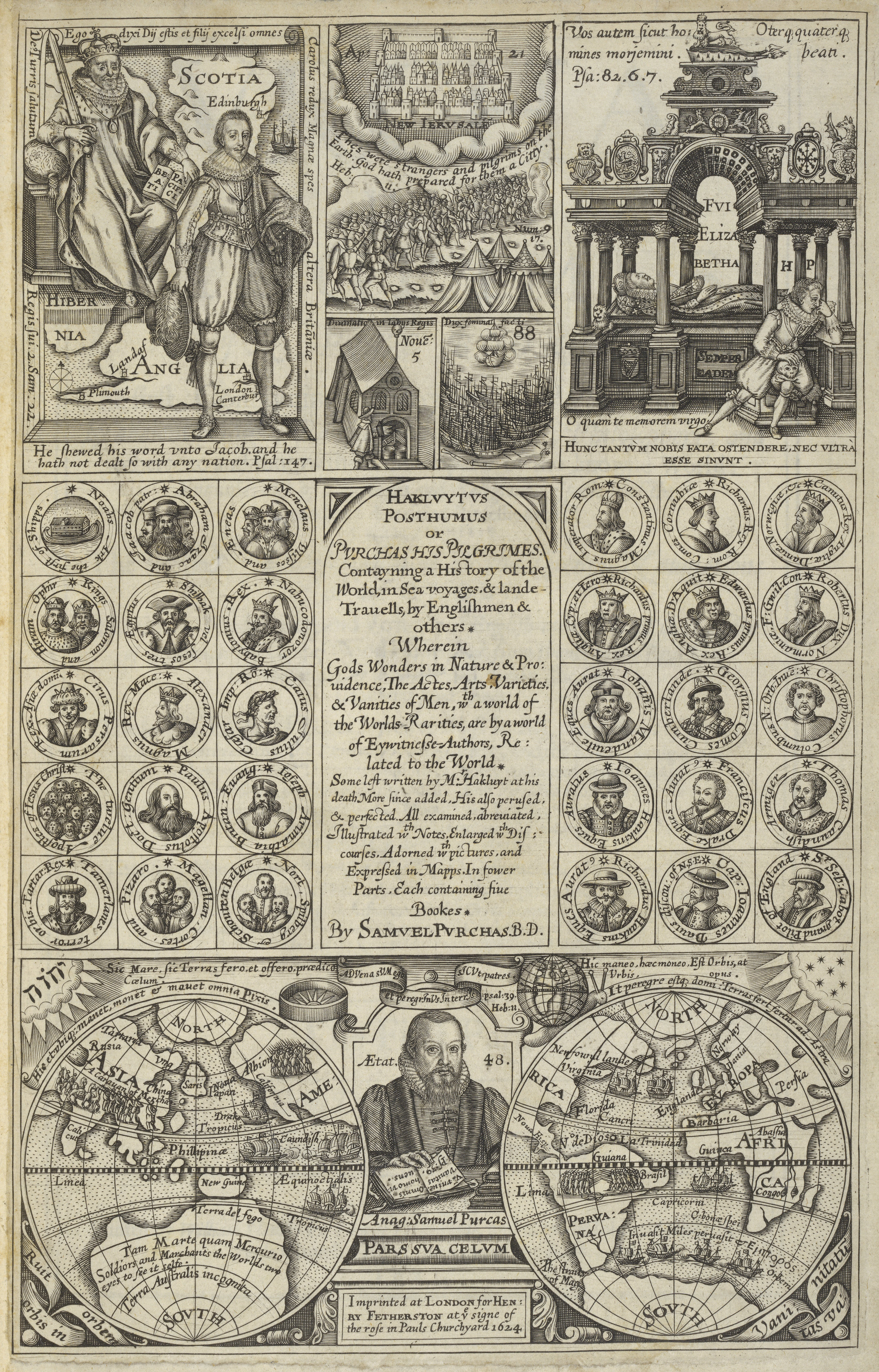
Title page of Samuel Purchas's magnum opus: Hakluytus Posthumus, or Purchas his Pilgrimes, London, 1625

His second book, Purchas his Pilgrim or Microcosmus, or the Historie of Man. Relating the Wonders of his Generation, Vanities in his Degeneration, Necessities of his Regenerations, was published in 1619.

In 1625, Purchas published Hakluytus Posthumus, or Purchas his Pilgrimes, a massive four-volume collection of travel stories that can be seen as a continuation of Richard Hakluyt's Principal Navigations (first published in 1589) and was partly based on manuscripts left by Hakluyt, who had died in 1616. Although the work is not methodically organized, it may be thematically divided into four volumes:

- Volume I explores ancient kings, beginning with Solomon, and records stories of circumnavigation around the African coast to the East Indies, China, and Japan.
- Volume II is dedicated to Africa, Palestine, Persia, and Arabia.
- Volume III provides history of the North-East and North-West passages and summaries of travels to Tartary, Russia, and China.
- Volume IV deals with America and the West Indies.

The fourth edition of the Pilgrimage (published in 1626) is usually catalogued as the fifth volume of the Pilgrimes, but the two works are essentially distinct. Purchas himself said of the two volumes:

These brethren, holding much resemblance in name, nature and feature, yet differ in both the object and the subject. This [i.e. the Pilgrimage] being mine own in matter, though borrowed, and in form of words and method; whereas my Pilgrimes are the authors themselves. acting their own parts in their own words, only furnished by me with such necessities as that stage further required, and ordered according to my rules.

Purchas died in September or October 1626, according to some in a debtors' prison, nearly ruined by the expenses of his encyclopedic labor. Others believe that the patronage of Dr. King, the Bishop of London (in office: 1611 to 1621), which provided him with the Rectory of St Martin, Ludgate, and made him Chaplain to the Archbishop of Canterbury, relieved him from his financial troubles. In addition, his move to London allowed Purchas to expand his research. None of his works was reprinted till the Glasgow reissue of the Pilgrimes in 1905–1907.

As an editor and compiler, Purchas was often injudicious, careless and even unfaithful; but his collections contain much of value and are frequently the only sources of information upon important questions affecting the history of exploration.

His editorial decisions as well as the commentary he added can be understood from his basic goal: to edify and educate the reader about the world, foreign culture, and morality. In contrast, Hakluyt aimed to inspire and to interest the nation to pursue exploration.

== Inspiration for Coleridge, "Kubla Khan" ==
Purchas his Pilgrimage became one of the sources of inspiration for the poem "Kubla Khan" by Samuel Taylor Coleridge. As Coleridge explains in a note with which he prefaced his poem:

In the summer of the year 1797, the Author, then in ill health, had retired to a lonely farm-house between Porlock and Linton, on the Exmoor confines of Somerset and Devonshire. In consequence of a slight indisposition, an anodyne had been prescribed, from the effects of which he fell asleep in his chair at the moment that he was reading the following sentence, or words of the same substance, in 'Purchas's Pilgrimage': 'Here the Khan Kubla commanded a palace to be built, and a stately garden thereunto. And thus ten miles of fertile ground were inclosed with a wall.'

Ernest Hartley Coleridge's edition of the poem compares the following passage from Purchas:

In Xamdu did Cubla Can build a stately Palace, encompassing sixteene miles of plaine ground with a wall, wherein are fertile Meddowes, pleasant Springs, delightful Streames, and all sorts of beasts of chase and game, and in the middest thereof a sumptuous house of pleasure.

John Livingston Lowes, attempting to trace Coleridge's thinking, also finds an echo of the account of Kubla Khan given in Purchas's Pilgrimes.

== Writings ==
- Purchas His Pilgrimage. Or Relations of the World and the Religions Observed in All Ages Discouered, from the Creation unto This Present (1st edition, 1613; 2nd edition, 1614).
- Purchas, his Pilgrim. Microcosmus, or the historie of Man. Relating the wonders of his Generation, vanities in his Degeneration, Necessity of his Regeneration (1619).
- Hakluytus Posthumus or Purchas his Pilgrimes, contayning a History of the World in Sea Voyages and Lande Travells, by Englishmen and others (4 volumes, 1625). Reprinted in 1905–1907 in 20 volumes.

== See also ==
- Turtles all the way down
