= Vice-Chancellor of the University of Cape Town =

The Vice-Chancellor of the University of Cape Town (UCT) is the executive head also referred to as the principal. The VC has the overall responsibility for the policy and administration of the University. The current Vice-Chancellor is Mosa Moshabela.

== List of vice-chancellors ==
- 1918-1938: Sir John Carruthers Beattie
- 1938-1947: AW Falconer
- 1948-1955: TB Davie
- 1956-1957: Reginald W. James, in an acting capacity
- 1958-1967: Jacobus Duminy
- 1968-1980: Sir Richard Luyt
- 1981-1996: Stuart J Saunders
- 1996-2000: Mamphela Ramphele
- 2000-2008: Njabulo Ndebele
- 2008-2018: Max Price
- 2018-2023: Mamokgethi Phakeng - placed on special leave and then early retirement
- 2023-2024: Daya Reddy (Interim)
- 2024-Current: Mosa Moshabela

== See also ==
- Chancellor of the University of Cape Town
