= Nkosinathi Nkomo =

Nkosinathi Nkomo (1992 – 3 December 2017) was a South African civil engineering student and inventor. He was a student at the University of Cape Town (UCT) and became known in 2017 for developing AquaRenu, a greywater recycling system intended to reduce household water consumption during the Cape Town water crisis.

== Early life and education ==
Nkomo was born in 1992 in Soweto, Johannesburg. He studied civil engineering at the University of Cape Town and experienced financial difficulties during his studies and was unable to register for the 2017 academic year before subsequently developing AquaRenu as an entrepreneurial project.UCT later announced that Nkomo's studies for 2018 had been secured through a scholarship from a UCT professor who wished to remain anonymous.

== AquaRenu ==
In 2017, during the severe drought affecting Cape Town, Nkomo developed a greywater recycling and irrigation system through a company called AquaRenu.The system collected used water from sources including washing machines, baths, showers and basins, filtered it and stored it for reuse, particularly in garden irrigation. Nkomo and his team also worked on designs incorporating rainwater harvesting and greywater for toilet flushing and irrigation.

Nkomo developed AquaRenu with fellow students and associates including Sesethu Mazangazanga, Njabule Gule and Monica Masetola. According to UCT, the project sought to make greywater and rainwater harvesting systems affordable for ordinary South African households.

The company had clients in Cape Town and Johannesburg and was reported to have been involved in installations at schools in Mpumalanga province. In October 2017, the South African Parliament recorded a motion congratulating the AquaRenu team and identifying Nkomo as the inventor. The motion called on government, local authorities and citizens to support AquaRenu as a potential response to water shortages in the Western Cape. Nkomo also appeared in an October 2017 episode of the podcast South Africans Doing Great Things, where he discussed AquaRenu and its greywater system.

== Death ==
Nkomo died on 3 December 2017 in Cape Town. According to police quoted by contemporary South African media, Nkomo's body was discovered at the Upper East Side Hotel in Cape Town in the early hours of 3 December. Police said that Nkomo had allegedly fallen from the balcony of a fifth-floor apartment. An inquest case was opened and police stated that no foul play was suspected at that stage.

UCT Vice-Chancellor Max Price announced Nkomo's death in a message to the university community on 8 December. Price stated that the circumstances surrounding the death were unclear and that the South African Police Service was investigating. Nkomo's family questioned the circumstances of his death, with his father, Moses Ndimande, rejecting the suggestion that his son had committed suicide, saying that Nkomo had no debts and had been preparing to return to university. Ndimande said that he believed the circumstances surrounding his son's death would eventually become known. Police stated that no foul play was suspected when the inquest was opened.

== WaterLoo controversy ==
In February 2018, two months after Nkomo's death, a controversy developed on social media concerning alleged similarities between AquaRenu and WaterLoo, a greywater-saving product designed by industrial designer Retief Krige.

The controversy followed a public message by the then Western Cape Premier Helen Zille congratulating Krige on the WaterLoo product. Social-media users subsequently alleged that WaterLoo had similarities to Nkomo's AquaRenu system and questioned the circumstances surrounding Nkomo's death.

Krige denied having known Nkomo or having prior knowledge of AquaRenu and stated that WaterLoo was an independently developed product and that its design and intended use differed from AquaRenu. Krige stated that WaterLoo was designed to sit on top of a toilet cistern and be filled manually with greywater, whereas AquaRenu was an outdoor system connected to household plumbing and designed to filter and collect greywater. Police had stated in December 2017 that no foul play was suspected and that an inquest had been opened.

== Legacy ==
Nkomo became known for attempting to address Cape Town's water shortage through an affordable greywater recycling system. His work received coverage from UCT, South African news organisations and other media outlets during the 2017 drought.The South African Parliament formally recognized the AquaRenu team in October 2017 and identified Nkomo as the invention's creator.Following his death, UCT described Nkomo as an innovative and determined student whose work had attracted national attention during the Cape Town water crisis.
