= Mamokgethi Phakeng =

South African Mathematician and Research scientist

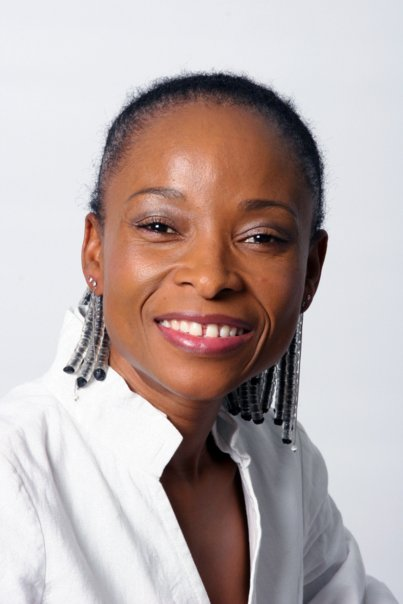
- Mamokgethi Phakeng

Vice-Chancellor of University of Cape Town
- In office 1 July 2018 – 3 March 2023
- Chancellor: Graça Machel; Precious Moloi-Motsepe
- Preceded by: Max Price
- Succeeded by: Daya Reddy

Personal details
- Born: 1 November 1966 (age 59) Ga-Rankuwa, Pretoria, South Africa
- Children: 1
- Education: University of North-West; University of the Witwatersrand
- Awards: Africa Education Medal (2022)

Rosina Mamokgethi Phakeng GCOB OIG (née Mmutlana, born 1 November 1966) is a South African professor of mathematics education who in 2018 became a vice-chancellor of the University of Cape Town (UCT). She has been the vice principal of research and innovation, at the University of South Africa and acting executive dean of the College of Science, Engineering and Technology at UNISA. In 2018 she was an invited speaker at the International Congresses of Mathematicians. In February 2023 it was announced that she would leave her position as vice-chancellor of UCT and take early retirement. She was succeeded by Professor Daya Reddy on 13 March 2023.

== Early life ==
Phakeng was born in Eastwood, Pretoria, to Frank and Wendy Mmutlana (née Thipe). Her mother went back to school after having her three children to complete Form 3 as entry to gaining a Primary Teachers Certificate to practice as a teacher. Her father was one of the first black radio announcers at the South African Broadcasting Corporation (SABC).

Phakeng started school in 1972 at Ikageleng Primary in Marapyane village and then Ikageng Primary in Ga-Rankuwa. She attended Tsela-tshweu higher primary; Tswelelang Higher Primary; Thuto-Thebe Middle School; Odi High School and Hebron. She completed her matric with University Exemption in 1983 (Grade 12) in the village of Hebron's College of Education.

== Higher education ==
Phakeng achieved a Bachelor of Education in mathematics education at the University of North-West, and a M.Ed in mathematics education at the University of the Witwatersrand, and in 2002 became the first black female South African to obtain a PhD in mathematics education. In September 2022, Phakeng won the first Africa Education Medal for her commitment to promoting education in Africa, particularly for her research on language practices in multilingual mathematics classrooms.

=== Career accomplishments ===
Phakeng has won awards for excellence in service. These honors include:

- Doctor of Science, honoris causa, University of Bristol
- The Order of the Baobab (Silver) for her excellent contribution in the field of science and representing South Africa on the international stage through her outstanding research work presented to her by former president of South Africa Jacob Zuma (April 2016)
- Order of Ikhamanga in gold
- CEO Magazine award for being the most influential woman in education and training in South Africa (August 2013)
- NSTF award for being the most outstanding Senior Black Female Researcher over the last 5 to 10 years in recognition of her innovative, quality research on teaching and learning mathematics in multilingual classrooms (May 2011)
- Golden key International Society Honorary life membership (May 2009)
- Association of Mathematics Education of South Africa (AMESA) honorary life membership (July 2009)
- Amstel Salute to Success finalist (2005)
- Dr. T. W. Khambule Research Award for being the most outstanding young female black researcher for 2003 – conferred by the NSTF (May 2004)
- Outstanding Service Award (Education category) – conferred by the Sunday Sun and Christ Centred Church (2004)
- Finalist for SA Woman of the Year in the Science and Technology Category (2003)
- Prestige National Award South Africa's Inspirational Women Achievers Award – conferred by RCP Media, (June 2003)
- NRF Thuthuka Award (2003–2008)
- National Research Foundation/National Science Foundation USA/SA fellowship (2001, 2003)
- Mellon Award (1998–2000)
- SAB Women in Rural Areas Award (1997)

=== Positions held ===
- Vice-Chancellor of the University of Cape Town (2018–2023)
- Deputy Vice-Chancellor of the University of Cape Town (2016)
- Vice-Principal of Research and Innovation at the University of South Africa
- Executive Dean of College of Science Engineering and Technology of University of South Africa
- Honorary Professor of University of the Witwatersrand
- Professor extraordinaire of Tshwane University of Technology
- Deputy Chairperson of National Committee for the International Mathematics Union
- Trustee of FirstRand Foundation
- Trustee of Telkom SA Foundation
- Board Member of South Africa, International Council for Science (ICSU) Board
- Managing Director of Pythagoras
- Bristol Illustrious Visiting Professor

== Personal life ==
Phakeng was married to Richard Setati for 19 years (1988–2007) and they had one son, Tsholofelo who was born in 1990. In 2012, she married Madimetja Lucky Phakeng, thereby adding the appendage "Phakeng" to her surname. Lucky Phakeng is an advocate currently heading the Takeover Regulation Panel.

== Controversy ==
Shortly after being appointed to the position as vice-chancellor of UCT, allegations questioning Phakeng's academic credentials emerged which she characterised as being part of a smear campaign against her.

On 22 February 2023 it was reported by News24 that Phakeng would take early retirement from her position as vice-chancellor of UCT following the appointment of an independent panel to investigate allegations of mismanagement and abuse of power. Phakeng was paid R12 million (US$667,000) for the leaving before her contract expired in 2028 whilst an investigation into allegations of mismanagement and abuse of power was conducted by an independent panel of retired judges. The report, published eight months later, concluded that Phakeng's conduct whilst vice-chancellor at UCT was problematic with notable and repeated instances of unprofessional conduct.

=== Twitter ===
During her time at UCT a number of controversial social media statements have been made via Phakeng's Twitter account.

In 2018 Phakeng controversially congratulated a UCT student activist, Masixole Mlandu, who notably ended his undergraduate paper with the racially divisive slogan "One Settler, One Bullet." Phakeng later stated she regretted the divisive incident, did not see the statement before making the congratulatory statement, would never support calls for violence, and was instead trying to congratulate a student on a significant personal academic milestone.

=== Managerial style ===
Phakeng's tenure as vice-chancellor of UCT was controversial with accusations by university academics and the university's ombud that she allowed for the emergence of a culture of fear, secrecy, racialisation, unfair treatment and bullying within the university that resulted in the departure of numerous academics. The ombud and the university's former deputy council chair accused Phakeng of covering up accusations and findings against her whilst the university's former deputy vice-chancellor for teaching and learning accused her of having deliberately misled university's Senate. In a Senate vote on the matter Phakeng controversially cast a deciding vote against an independent investigation into her own conduct, thereby possibly breaching university conflict of interest rules. Phakeng's supporters, including the Economic Freedom Fighters, alleged that she was being targeted by groups resistant to racial transformation of the university. UCT stated that the accusations against Phakeng contained within a 2022 Daily Maverick article on the matter were "incorrect, misleading and unethical"; the Daily Maverick disputed UCT's criticisms of their article.

== Independent investigation into UCT governance ==
=== Introduction ===
An independent panel, chaired by retired judge Lex Mpati, featuring fellow retired judge Azhar Cachalia, public sector governance expert Trish Hanekom and Wits transformation head Bernadette Johnson investigated governance issues at the University of Cape Town (UCT), triggered by undisclosed events leading to Associate Professor Lis Lange's departure and a subsequent Non-Disclosure Agreement. The probe was initiated amid the extension of Vice-Chancellor (VC) Professor Mamokgethi Phakeng's term, highlighting concerns over executive committee stability and unexplained senior resignations.

=== Revised terms of reference ===
The Council revised the investigation's scope following VC Phakeng's agreed exit, broadening the inquiry to address broader governance failures and their impact on executive resignations from January 2018 to December 2022, with a view towards recommending future preventive strategies.

=== Breaches of law and policy ===
The Panel implicated former VC Phakeng in several breaches of law and policy, including unlawful contract terminations, defamatory behaviour, conflicts of interest, and unprofessional conduct. Additionally, she engaged in prohibited activities such as issuing threats, employing ethnic slurs, and sharing racially offensive content on social media.

=== Senior resignations ===
Investigations revealed that the actions of Mamokgethi Phakeng and the Chair of Council, Ms Babalwa Ngonyama, were central to the resignation of several senior UCT officials:

- Professor Loretta Feris, former Deputy Vice-Chancellor (DVC) for Transformation
- Dr Russel Ally, former Executive Director of Development and Alumni
- Associate Professor Lis Lange, former DVC for Teaching and Learning
- Ms Gerda Kruger, former Executive Director of Communication and Marketing
- Mr Royston Pillay, Registrar
- Dr Reno Morar, former Chief Operating Officer
- Professor Linda Ronnie, former Dean of Commerce (now returned as acting DVC for Teaching and Learning)
- Ms Miriam Hoosain, Executive Director of HR
- Ms Judith du Toit, Director in the Office of the VC.

Academic offices
Preceded by Max Price	Vice-Chancellor of the University of Cape Town; 2018–2023	Succeeded by Daya Reddy
