= Thybo =

Thybo is a Danish surname. Notable people with this surname include:

- Hans Thybo (born 1954), Danish geoscientist
- Jesper Søndergaard Thybo (born 1999), Danish chess grand master
- Kurt Thybo or Kurt Thyboe (1940–2021), Danish author, journalist, sports commentator and performer
- Leif Thybo (1922–2001), Danish organist and composer
