= St Laurence and All Saints Church, Eastwood =

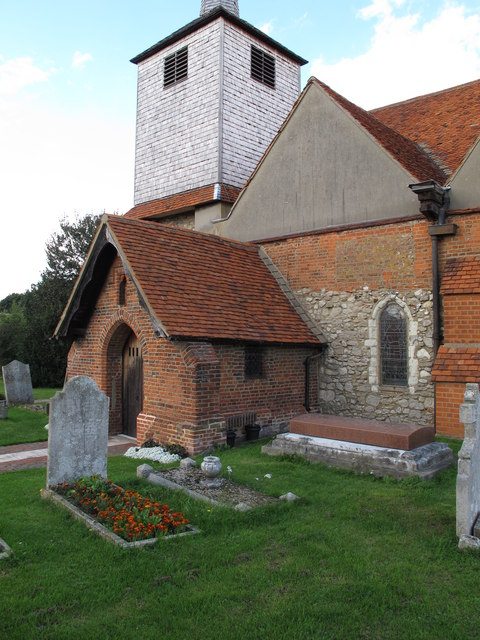
- St Laurence and All Saints Church, Eastwood
- St Laurence and All Saints Church, Eastwood
- 51°34′3.5″N 0°41′5.3″E
- Location: Eastwood, Essex
- Country: England
- Denomination: Anglican
- Website: www.st-laurence.org.uk

History
- Status: Parish church
- Founded: pre-1100
- Dedication: Lawrence of Rome

Architecture
- Functional status: Active
- Heritage designation: Listed building – Grade I
- Architectural type: Church
- Style: Norman

Specifications
- Length: 73 ft 0 in (22 m)
- Width: 36 ft 0 in (11 m)
- Materials: Rag-stone rubble

Administration
- Province: Canterbury
- Diocese: Chelmsford
- Archdeaconry: Southend
- Deanery: Hadleigh
- Parish: Eastwood

Clergy
- Bishop: Bishop of Bradwell
- Rector: Revd. Capt. Kingsley Yeboah RAChD

St Laurence and All Saints is a Grade I listed medieval church in the parish of Eastwood, Essex, England, near to Southend-on-Sea. Its location adjacent to the perimeter of London Southend Airport has led to the church being threatened by proposals to expand the airport.

The church has been described as "one of the finest and most important small medieval churches in South Essex, and of exceptional architectural, archaeological and historical significance". Notable features include the complex plan form and development, Norman font and doors with original fittings and the medieval woodwork including a priest's room. The site is also of "considerable, possibly exceptional, archaeological significance".

== Location ==
The church is situated to the east of Eastwood which is now a suburb of Southend-on-Sea, a large urban conurbation on the Thames estuary, which is part of the Thames Gateway regeneration project. The church stands in Eastwoodbury Lane, close to its junction with Aviation Way; Eastwoodbury Lane once crossed directly under the flight path into the main runway of Southend Airport until the runway was extended when a new road named St Laurence Way was built to allow cars to pass the end of the newly extended runway. To the east, the churchyard borders on the wire fence at the boundary of the airport with aircraft regularly landing close to the church.

== History ==
=== Eastwood ===
Eastwood took its name from its situation on the eastern side of the woods and parkland of Rayleigh and Thundersley which were part of the Great Forest of Essex. The village is mentioned in the Domesday Book of 1086 as "Estwa", and was held by Suen of Essex, whose father Robert had held it during the reign of Edward the Confessor. Suen's son, Robert of Essex, founded Prittlewell Priory in the year 1100, but his grandson, Henry of Essex, forfeited all his estates to the Crown in 1163, after being charged with treason and cowardice in battle. After this date the manor was generally held by the Crown.

In the 13th century, the English Kings would often visit the district for hunting, making Hadleigh Castle their residence. Henry VIII was the last king known to have hunted here and Eastwood Lodge was the centre of the last reserved portion of hunting land. In 1536, during the Reformation, the Manor was given by Edward VI to Lord Rich whose descendants became Earls of Warwick, then by marriage it passed to the Earl of Nottingham.

The Bristow family purchased the estate and held it until 1866 when it was sold in lots: "Eastwoodbury", the large house which stood immediately to the east of the Church, was on the site of the original Manor house. It was demolished in 1954.

In the course of the centuries this parish of 3,000 acres, with its scattered population, changed from woodland to an agricultural parish and today to a largely built-up area.

=== History of the church ===
The first known record of the church is in 1100 A.D. when Robert Fitz Suen (Robert d'Essex) gave the chapels of Eastwood, Sutton and Prittlewell to the Prior of Prittlewell. It is evident that there was a church at Eastwood before that date; this was probably the present Norman nave with a small apsidal chancel. The antiquity of the site is borne out by the presence of a sarsen stone built into the walls. There are claims that this is the remains from when the site was used for pagan worship.

The early development of the church is still not completely understood. The nave is 12th-century in origin, with Norman window openings in the north wall. The south aisle was added in the 13th century and the north aisle in the 14th. The chancel is 13th-century, with a 14th-century roof. The nave roof is 15th-century.

The brick south porch was added in the 16th century. There were extensive works within the church in the 1870s when it was thoroughly restored by William White, including new seating. The broach spire was restored in the late 20th century.

== The church exterior ==
The church is built of ragstone rubble with some flint and has limestone dressings; there is also some Roman and Tudor brickwork. The south wall of the south aisle shows the original rubble with red Tudor brickwork on the top, three to four feet in depth and above the windows. In the south-east corner, the stone has given way and been replaced by Tudor brick, reinforced by a Tudor brick buttress. At some time, the east wall of the north aisle had cracked badly and been repaired very roughly by Tudor brickwork above the window.

The exterior was covered with cement rendering which was completely removed in 1971. The plaster can be seen in a drawing of the church from 1849. The records show that in the early 17th century the church was in a ruinous state; this was borne out when the old exterior plastering was stripped off.

The church stands within a large churchyard containing monuments including chest tombs dating back to the 18th century, with 20th-century extensions to the north containing several war graves. The churchyard is a pleasant area of trees, grass and wild flowers, carefully managed for its wildlife value.

The church was popular with gypsies and other members of the travelling community who used it for christenings, marriages and funerals. The so-called "King of the Gypsies", Louis Boswell, was buried at Eastwood church in 1835. In the Burial Register he is described as a "Traveller aged 42" – "This man known as the King of the Gypsies was interred in the presence of a vast concourse of spectators".

There is a large modern brick vestry off the north aisle.

=== The tower ===
The small tower, which is 6 ft 6 in (1.98 m) square, has a timber-framed and shingled upper part, with a broach spire, which was restored in the 20th century. Unusually, it is positioned at the west end of the south aisle. The lower stage is early-13th-century but the upper stage is modern. The presence of Tudor brick buttresses outside suggest that the upper portion became unsafe and was taken down.

The spire was repaired by the Canadian Government after the Second World War as a lasting memorial to airmen who had flown from Southend during the war.

=== Bells ===
There are three original bells, two 14th-century and one 17th-century; there was a fourth bell which had disappeared. For many years the ancient wooden bell frame had been unsafe for ringing, although the tenor bell could be tolled. In 1984 the tower was strengthened to hold a new metal bell frame and the three old bells were re-hung and augmented to a ring of six by the addition of three lighter bells. During this work, one of the old bells (now the 5th) which was cracked was repaired by welding.

The inscriptions on the bells are:

- Tenor: Sancta Gregori ora pro nobis (St. Gregory pray for us) (Cast 1380)
- No. 5: Sancta Katerina ora pro nobis (St. Katherine pray for us) (Cast 1380)
- No. 4: Charles Newman made me (Cast 1693)
- No. 3: We praise thee O God (in memory of Ethel & Gladys Fowler of Cockethurst Farm) (Cast 1985)
- No. 2: O come let us sing unto the Lord (in memory of Ranie & May Fowler of Cockethurst Farm) (Cast 1985)
- Treble: Unto thee O Lord do we give thanks (The gift of Mable Free) (Cast 1985)

The three new bells were cast at the Whitechapel Bell Foundry.

== The church interior ==
Tradition has it that St Laurence (to whom the church was dedicated) was martyred on a gridiron (in 258) and the church layout is said to take the form of a gridiron, with the chancel representing the handle and the nave and two side aisles the bars.

The interior is thickly plastered and whitewashed, with traces of medieval painted decoration. The nave is fully pewed, with plain benches and choir stalls from the White restoration.

=== The porch ===
The porch dates from the 16th century, pre-reformation, and is built in brick. The roof timber was old timber reused. There is a pre-Reformation niche over the door and a holy water stoup on the east side of the doorway.

=== The chancel ===
The chancel, measuring 29 ft 0 in (8.84 m) by 16 ft 0 in (4.88 m), dates from the 13th century with a 14th-century roof. The chancel arch is 14th-century, plain with no mouldings and traces of an earlier roof gable above it, and preserving two sawn-off ends of the rood beam. The roof has braced collar beams and the two tie beams are moulded.

The east window has been restored with glass from 1887. There are two windows in the north wall of the chancel; the eastern is mid-14th-century but the western is earlier, from the 13th century. The south wall has two windows, the eastern corresponding to the window in the north wall. The other is a low side window of the late 13th century or early 14th century with one pointed light, set in a wide 14th-century recess. This window was probably unglazed with a wooden shutter and may have been used as a sanctus window through which the sanctus bell was rung at the Elevation of the host.

To the east of this is a priest's door, recently replaced. There are traces of a piscina behind the panelling on the north wall. Before the altar are 18th-century tombs of the Vassal family, former owners of Cockethurst Farm, and a brass effigy of Thomas Burroughs dated 1600.

=== The nave ===
The nave measures 44 ft 0 in (13.41 m) by 20 ft 0 in (6.10 m) and dates from the 12th century and is the oldest part of the church. The nave roof is 15th-century with massive tie beams. Four of the trusses have octagonal crown posts of unusual workmanship for a village Church. When the roof was re-tiled in 1935, the 7 in × 7 in (180 mm × 180 mm) beams were found to be as sound as when originally installed.

The original Norman windows can be seen in the north wall with traces of two others also visible. There were probably three windows in each wall of the original Norman Church.

In the 13th century, the first alteration to the original church was the piercing of the south wall by three Early English bays and the building of the south aisle. The octagonal columns have moulded capitals and bases and brick plinths. The angles of two columns have been flattened to give a view of the altar to the ringer in the tower and the easternmost arch has a curiously chamfered portion, the purpose of which is uncertain.

At the junction of this arcade with the chancel are two 13th-century recesses, one having been cut away and afterwards filled up, and the other pierced to allow access to the south aisle. A hagioscope or squint has been cut in a very simple manner through the angle of the chancel wall giving a view of the high altar from the south aisle.

The best alteration was the piercing of the north wall by two wide 14th-century arches. These arches have no supporting columns but spring from the wall direct and the easternmost arch shows some of 13th-century capping, probably of a former recess cut away when the arcade was made.

=== The south aisle ===
The south aisle is 9 ft 6 in (2.90 m) wide was added in the 13th century and altered in the 15th century when the roof was raised to incorporate a clerestory which was never completed. The roof comprises two plastered gables.

The addition to the height can be seen on the interior wall. The east window is of uncertain date and has been modernised. There are two windows in the south wall. The eastern one is 14th-century with two trefoil lights and is square-headed, with modern glass. The sill is a stone slab with a moulded edge, probably from a tomb or altar. The other window is one, wide pointed, 13th-century light (probably a lancet window reduced) with modern glass showing St Laurence with gridiron.

This aisle was formerly used as a side chapel as the 14th-century piscina and aumbry indicate and may have been a Lady Chapel. There are slight traces of colouring on the pillar below the eastern end of the arcade and holes which may indicate support for a statue. It has now been restored to use as a side chapel.

On the stonework level with the pews, are two scratched figures or graffiti, one of a knight in armour and the other a curious serpent-like figure. The ancient chest is situated in this aisle.

==== The font ====
The font is remarkable for its unusual figure and peculiar form. It is the best example in Essex of a late Norman or Early English font, (late 12th century), shown by the semicircular arcading round the drum interlaced to form pointed arches and by slender shafting.

=== The north aisle ===
The north aisle is 6 ft 6 in (1.98 m) wide and dates from the 14th century. In the east wall is a 14th-century Late Decorated window with two cinquefoil windows which has been partly restored.

In the north wall is a 14th-century doorway, the 12th-century door is similar to the South door.

At the west end of the north aisle is a small and unusual 15th-century priests' room – an oak framed apartment of two stages lighted by a small 15th-century square-headed window. This has a heavy plank and muntin screen with narrow door and roof of heavy joists supporting the upper floor. The screen is 15th-century oak with a moulded and embattled head and rail. The door is narrow, massive and nail studded. The use of this chamber is unknown, it may have been the sacristy and muniment room or a priests' room to accommodate the monk when the Church was served by Prittlewell Priory. The hinges of the door and the trap door are probably original. The lower chamber is now used as the Vicar's vestry and there is an oak bier, dated 1706, in the upper chamber.

In this aisle is a tombstone of Elizabeth Hooker (1666), another with the brasses torn off and an oak table thought to have been used as a Communion table during the time of Cromwell.

=== The church doors ===
The south doorway, which is 13th-century, Early English, has lost its original character, being now square-headed. This door and the north door inside the church are the most interesting in the district because of the strap ironwork on both.

The horizontal strap of the south door has an inscription in Lombardic letters which reads "Pax regat intrantes eadem regat egredientes" ("May peace rule those entering and also those leaving"). This ironwork is 12th- or even 11th-century, probably the work of a local smith and an excellent example of early craftsmanship.

The south door has a triangular knocker generally regarded as a Sanctuary knocker. The rolls of King Edward 1st show that, when he was hunting in the district, he granted a pardon to a criminal at Eastwood who had stolen three pigs. The man was condemned to be hanged but the rope broke; he escaped to the church for sanctuary until he was pardoned. He was afterwards exiled.

The north door was repaired and re-hung as the entrance to the new Choir Vestry in 1966 using locally made bricks and tiles of Tudor decoration. The north door may be somewhat earlier than the south as its ironwork is a little simpler.

=== Stained glass ===
The east window, by Cox, Sons, Buckley & Co., dates from 1887. The west window has modern stained glass from 1978 by Francis Skeat depicting the life of Samuel Purchas geographer and writer and Eastwood's most notable incumbent. The south wall window from 1964 depicts St Laurence.

=== The organ ===
The church organ is situated in one of the arches pierced into the north wall. It is a small two-manual pipe organ by Rushworth and Dreaper, from 1925, which was originally in Wesley Hall, Westcliff-on-Sea. It was installed in St Laurence by Martin Cross in 1976 who restored it in 2004.

== Churchyard ==
The churchyard contains war graves of two service personnel of World War I and eight of World War II.

== Expansion of London Southend Airport ==
London Southend Airport has a fairly short runway which prevents the use of large aircraft at the same time as other airports around London are congested. It was even shorter before an expansion in 2011–2012. The proximity of the church to the end of the runway historically created difficulties for the airport operation and plans to expand the capacity of the airport, causing the airport operator to put forward several proposals, including complete demolition of the church or moving it to a new location away from the airport's safety zone.

=== The 2001 proposals ===
In October 2001, the airport operators announced plans to expand the airport which included extending the runway by 450 m (1,500 ft). Under these proposals, it was planned to move the church out of the way, by using rollers or stilts, and to realign Eastwoodbury Lane. According to the airport authorities, moving the church 100 m (300 ft) closer to Aviation Way would enable it to build special buffer zones into the runway to meet tougher safety rules imposed by the Civil Aviation Authority.

The proposed move of the church would have required the creation of a "chassis" underneath the walls of the building to turn it into a "railway carriage". A track would have been laid, supported by concrete piles, to enable the building to be moved and lowered into its final position. Protesters claimed that such a move would cost up to £2 million and would disrupt graves and burial sites under the church itself.

In November, the local council backed the proposals in principle as long as various outstanding issues could be resolved but protesters, supported by local M.P. David Amess and by English Heritage, called for a public inquiry. At a public meeting held on 24 November, organised by Friends of the Earth, protesters were "overwhelmingly" of the view that the church should not be moved despite the council's support for the plans and the employment that would be generated by the airport expansion. In December, airport director Roger Campbell claimed that the proposal to move the church was the "only choice" available. This was rejected by local councillors, who suggested that the runway could have been extended at the northern end by putting the railway into a tunnel. This proposal was in turn rejected by Mr. Campbell, on the grounds that it was not "viable". The plans to move the church were rejected by English Heritage, who claimed "that no church that old has been moved before". Andrew Derrick, inspector of historic buildings at English Heritage, said: "We are very concerned about plans to move the church. It is a fine, historic and unspoiled church with some very important features."

In January 2002, in the face of continuing protests, Roger Campbell claimed that the airport could face closure if its expansion plans failed but, after a meeting between the church leaders and airport authorities, churchwarden Richard Huband reassured protesters that there would be no disturbance to graves should the move go ahead.

On 16 January, it was announced that the church had had its listing upgraded to Grade I status. Announcing the decision, Andrew Derrick stated:

"Grade I is the right grade for St. Laurence's Church and it confirms it as a very important building. Only the two per cent most important buildings in the country are Grade I listed so now the church is in the same bracket as the most important buildings. This means that demolishing the church would be unthinkable. Any decision on moving the church will have to go through the local planning authority, but being Grade I listed will make a difference on how people view the building."

On hearing the news, airport director Roger Campbell stated:

"The decision was simple – the church has to move if the airport is to survive. Thousands of jobs, which could be created if expansion plans go ahead, will be lost. It is not just a case of expansion. We have to comply with safety standards set down by the Civil Aviation Authority and they must be implemented. The future hinges on these plans."

The vicar of the church, Rev. Nigel Ransom, was delighted at the news.

"I was not surprised to hear from English Heritage that the church has been upgraded to a Grade I listed building. It is a unique and historic place. For more than 1,000 years the church has stood on this site undisturbed. It is shrouded in history and is truly a magnificent example of architecture. The decision by English Heritage will certainly make it more difficult for any plans to move the church. The local community is firmly against any changes and so am I."

In May 2002, the parochial church council voted to reject the proposals to move the church giving Rev. Nigel Ransom the power to block the proposals. Despite this, the airport vowed to continue with their expansion plans and were in the process of preparing formal documents to submit to Southend Council in a bid to get planning permission. Protesters vowed to "fight to the bitter end" with local councillors being united in their opposition to the proposals.

In October 2002, as it became clear that the plans to move the church in its entirety would not be supported by the local authorities, the airport made a proposal to partly demolish the existing church by lowering its walls and removing the spire, leaving the church as a monument. Under this scheme, the airport would have provided a new church and hall "in a more convenient location". Like the previous plans, this was also rejected by the church and Rev. Ransom. Finally, in January 2003 the airport lodged proposals with Southend Council to completely demolish the church to allow for the expansion of the airport. A spokesman for the airport said: "The location of the church causes a breach of CAA safety regulations but airport owners are committed to moving the church intact or giving the parish an alternative building."

MP David Amess continued to oppose the plans to demolish or move the church, saying "St. Laurence Church should be left alone." He also criticised the rules which prevented local councillors public announcing their views on controversial planning applications. In February 2003, the local Leigh-on-Sea town council voted to support the airport's expansion plans "on the proviso that disruption to St. Laurence church was minimised by moving, not demolishing it." Shortly afterwards, consultants appointed by the airport arranged a meeting with English Heritage to discuss the feasibility of moving the church.

On 2 April 2003, Southend Council unanimously rejected the planning application as the airport had not given sufficient reasons to require disturbing a 1,000-year-old building and because the proposal was in breach of several of the council's planning guidelines and the district plan. In August 2003, the airport announced plans to lodge an appeal against the decision of the local council.

In December 2003, the threat to the church began to be lifted when it was announced that permission had been granted for the installation of an instrument landing system on the land on the opposite side of Eastwoodbury Lane to the airport runway. This would be coupled with the installation of traffic lights and barriers in Eastwoodbury Lane either side of the landing zone to prevent traffic crossing under the path of aircraft as they come into land. Despite this, the airport did not immediately cancel its planned appeal, much to the dismay of the local council; in March the airport announced that the appeal would be withdrawn "as soon as all the safety checks had been done and final go-ahead given by the Civil Aviation Authority". This was expected to be by the end of June.

The appeal was finally withdrawn in November 2004, after the Civil Aviation Authority confirmed that the safety improvements put in place were sufficient to enable the necessary safety zones to be created and permit the return of commercial flights to the airport. As a result, all plans to move or demolish the church had been withdrawn.

=== The 2008 proposals ===
In January 2008, it was announced that the C.A.A. had given consent in principle to plans for a major expansion of the airport including a new terminal, control tower and railway station, together with a new hotel. The plans also involved the extension of the main runway by 300 m (1,000 ft) over Eastwoodbury Lane. This would require the diversion of Eastwoodbury Lane but would not have any serious impact on the church. At the same time, it was announced that the airport operators, Regional Airports, had put the airport up for sale and were seeking a buyer who could finance the anticipated £35 million cost of the planned improvements.

In December 2008, the airport was acquired by Stobart Air, a subsidiary of the Stobart transport group in a £21 million deal, with the intention of expanding the airport as a "niche air-freight destination" and attracting new passenger services. The new owners said that they "would work with the local council to discuss ways of developing the airport's potential, including the possibility of an extended runway which could help meet the undoubted demand for European business and leisure travel".

In June 2009, outline plans were announced to divert Eastwoodbury Lane to accommodate the proposed runway extension; under these proposals two groups of cottages at either side of the runway would be demolished together with a section of the church wall.

On 13 October 2009, a formal planning application was submitted to extend the runway in a south-westerly direction, by diverting Eastwoodbury Lane, together with the provision of a new cycleway and footpath around the extended runway. The plan also required the removal of a 38 m (125 ft) section of the church wall and its replacement by a yew hedge and the provision of a turning circle outside the church. The airport considered that although the proposals would have no direct impact on the church building, the additional air traffic would have a moderate to slight adverse impact on the setting of the church. This would be mitigated by the improved church entrance and the lack of passing vehicle traffic which will provide an overall enhancement to the tranquility of the area. It was made clear that the application did not involve the demolition of St Laurence and All Saints Church.

On 20 January 2010, Southend Council's Development Control Committee approved the runway extension plan although the recommendation was sent to the Communities Secretary John Denham for review. On 19 March 2010, John Denham approved the plans for the airport's development without the need for a public inquiry.

In July 2010, a small protest group against the airport expansion lodged an application for a Judicial review of the planning application; this was initially dismissed in the High Court in February 2011, as was a subsequent challenge.

The new road diversion opened in August 2011, and Eastwoodbury Lane, in the area in-line with the runway, was stopped up on 1 September 2011, thus enabling the works required to extend the runway to be commenced.

== Gallery ==
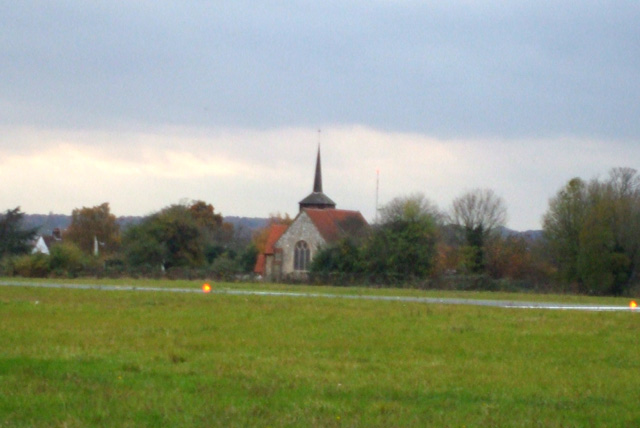
This photo of St Laurence and All Saints' Church at Eastwood was taken from Southend Flying Club.

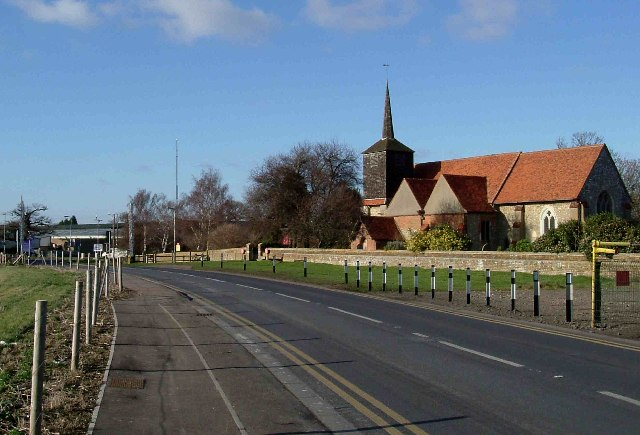
To the left can be seen the barriers that used to be lowered across the (now diverted) road for larger aircraft movements

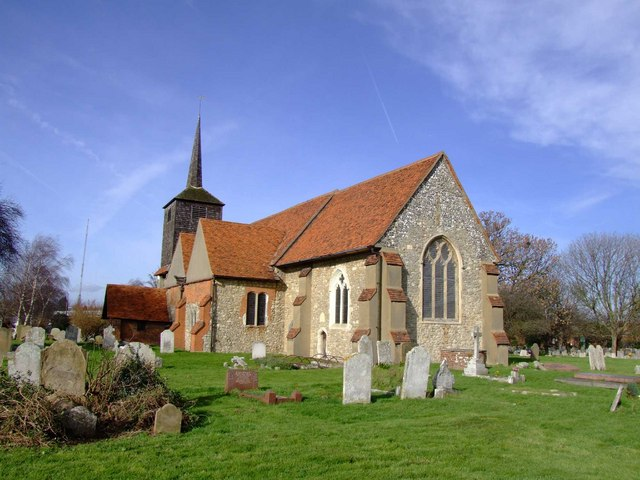
St Laurence and All Saints, Eastwood

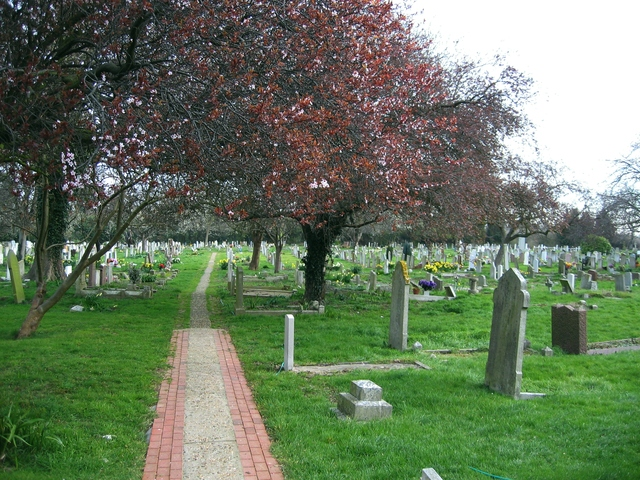
St Laurence graveyard

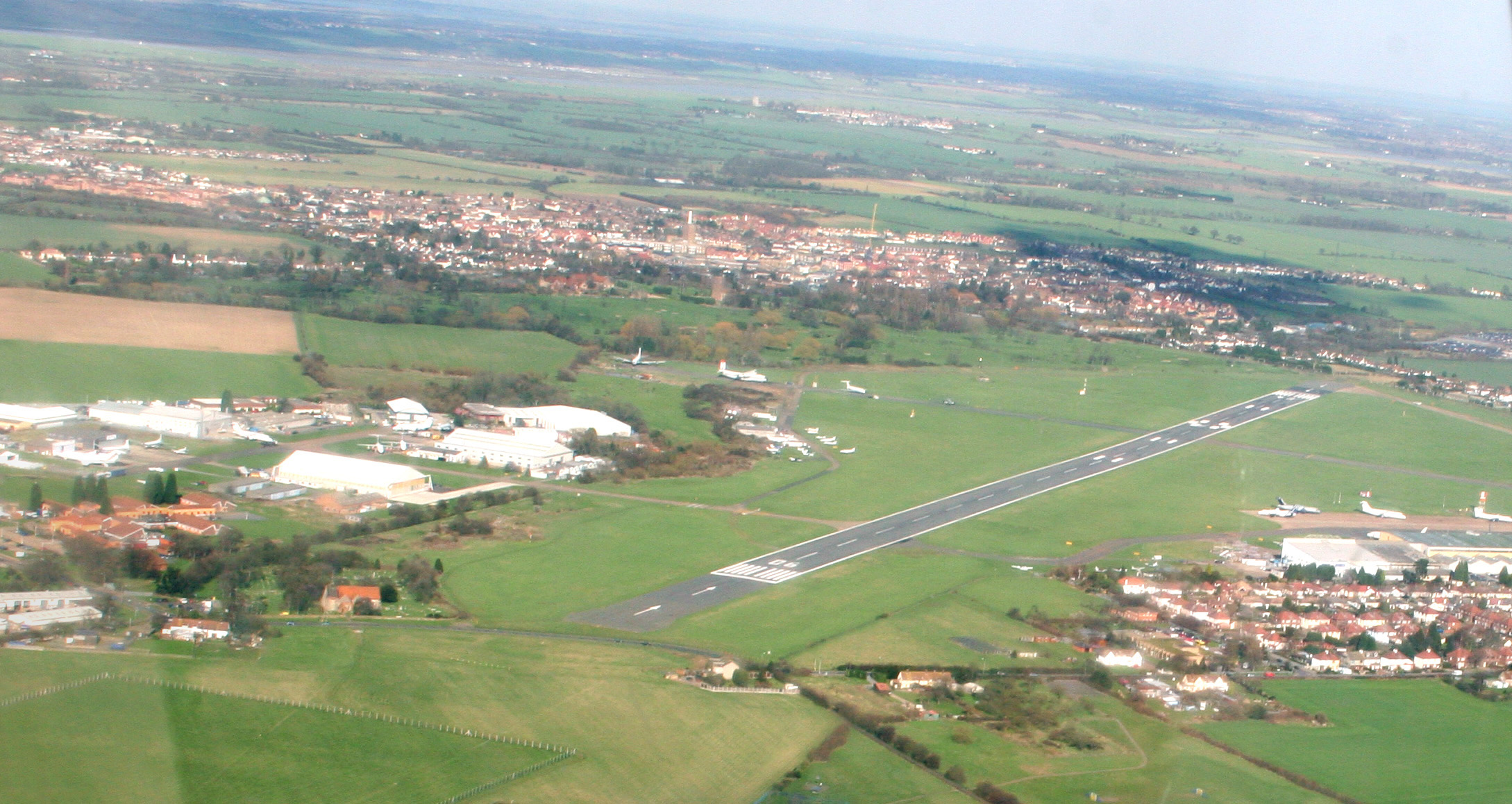
Aerial photo of runway at Southend Airport, looking north-east, showing the church in the lower left, taken in 2007

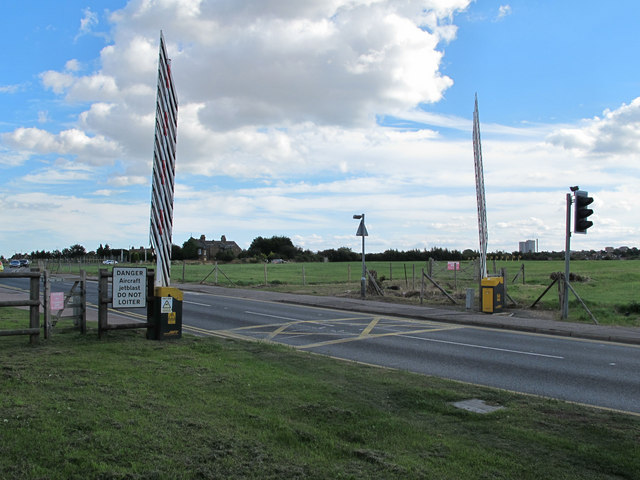
Frequent temporary closing of the barriers was required for larger aircraft movements prior to a new road being built that avoids this.

== Bibliography ==
- Sellers, Leonard (2010). Eastwood Essex A History. Peterborough: Fastprint Publishing. ISBN 978-184426-878-8.
