= Herbert Gleiter =

German physicist

Herbert Gleiter (born 13 October 1938 in Stuttgart) is a German researcher in physics and nanotechnology.

In 1966, he received his Ph.D. in physics from the University of Stuttgart in Germany. He received the Gottfried Wilhelm Leibniz Prize in 1988 for contributions to the field of nanotechnology. He became the Chair Professor of the Institute of Material Science at Saarland University, Germany in 1979. He has also held positions at Harvard University, the Massachusetts Institute of Technology, and the University of Bochum.

In 2004, he was elected a member of the National Academy of Engineering for contributions to the theoretical and practical uses of nanostructured materials.

Since 2012, he is Director and Chair Professor of the 'Herbert Gleiter Institute of Nanoscience' of 'Nanjing University of Science and Technology' of Nanjing in China. In 2019, he received the Advanced Materials Laureate during the 30th IAAM Award Assembly.

He was elected a Fellow of Core Academy (International Core Academy of Sciences and Humanities) in 2023.
