= International Core Academy of Sciences and Humanities =

- Abbreviation: CORE Academy
- Formation: 2010s
- Type: Nonprofit organization
- Purpose: Sciences and Humanities
- Headquarters: Hong Kong
- Region served: Worldwide
- Fields: Natural Sciences, Humanities, Social Sciences, Engineering, Mathematics and Informatics
- Members: ~300 Fellows and 500 Affiliated Members
- President: Di Zhang
- Key people: Herbert Gleiter, Hans Thybo, Philippe Aghion, James Heckman, Daya Reddy, Asad M. Madni, Artem Oganov, Steve Furber, Shu Chien, Stephen Greenblatt, Paul R. Sanberg, C. N. R. Rao
- Main organ: Secretariat, Council, Academic Committee, Executive Board
- Website: https://coreacad.org/

The International Core Academy of Sciences and Humanities known as CORE Academy, headquartered in Hong Kong, is an interdisciplinary, non-governmental, non-profit scientific organization. The organization is committed to recognizing outstanding academic achievements, promoting global academic cooperation, and advancing knowledge for the benefit of humanity.

International Core Academy of Sciences and Humanities
- Traditional Chinese: 國際科學與人文科學院
- Simplified Chinese: 国际科学与人文科学院
Transcriptions
Standard Mandarin
- Hanyu Pinyin: Guójì Kēxué yǔ Rénwén Kēxuéyuàn
Yue: Cantonese
- Jyutping: gwok3 zai3 fo1 hok6 jyu5 jan4 man4 fo1 hok6 jyun2

== Fellowship and Nomination ==
The International Core Academy of Sciences and Humanities follows a merit-based process for the election of Fellows. Nominations may be made by current Fellows or recommended by members of the Academic Committee, and require the support of existing Fellows. Candidates' academic records undergo a preliminary review, followed by evaluation from two Fellows who assess the quality and impact of the work. The Academic Committee then considers the overall scholarly contribution before the final decision is approved by the Board.

Election to the Academy's Fellowship is regarded as an internationally recognized academic honor, reflecting distinction in research, education, or leadership across the sciences and humanities. The process is conducted under confidentiality to ensure impartiality, fairness, and integrity.

In May 2026, Lero, the Research Ireland Research Centre for Software, reported that the Academy had more than 250 elected Fellows, including Nobel laureates, and a wider membership spanning more than 60 countries and regions.

== Operations ==
The Academy operates as an independent non-profit organization. Its management and decision-making are guided by principles of academic autonomy and are not associated with private interests or political positions. The Academy lists donations, grants, membership subscriptions, and program income among its sources of financial support. It states that its income and assets are used solely to further its institutional purposes.

== Affiliated Institutions ==
The International Core Academy of Sciences and Humanities (CORE Academy) maintains several affiliated institutions that support its research and international cooperation activities.

Its principal affiliate, the Ke Rui Academy, serves as the Academy's research institute, coordinating interdisciplinary studies and applied research across science, technology, and the humanities. The Academy has also established specialized centers and joint research institutes with partner institutions worldwide, such as the CORE Scientific Center for Artificial Intelligence (AI Institute), which focuses on artificial intelligence research, digital transformation, and computational innovation. These affiliated bodies contribute to the Academy's goal of fostering international research collaboration and advancing knowledge across disciplines.
