= Precious Moloi-Motsepe =

South African fashion entrepreneur

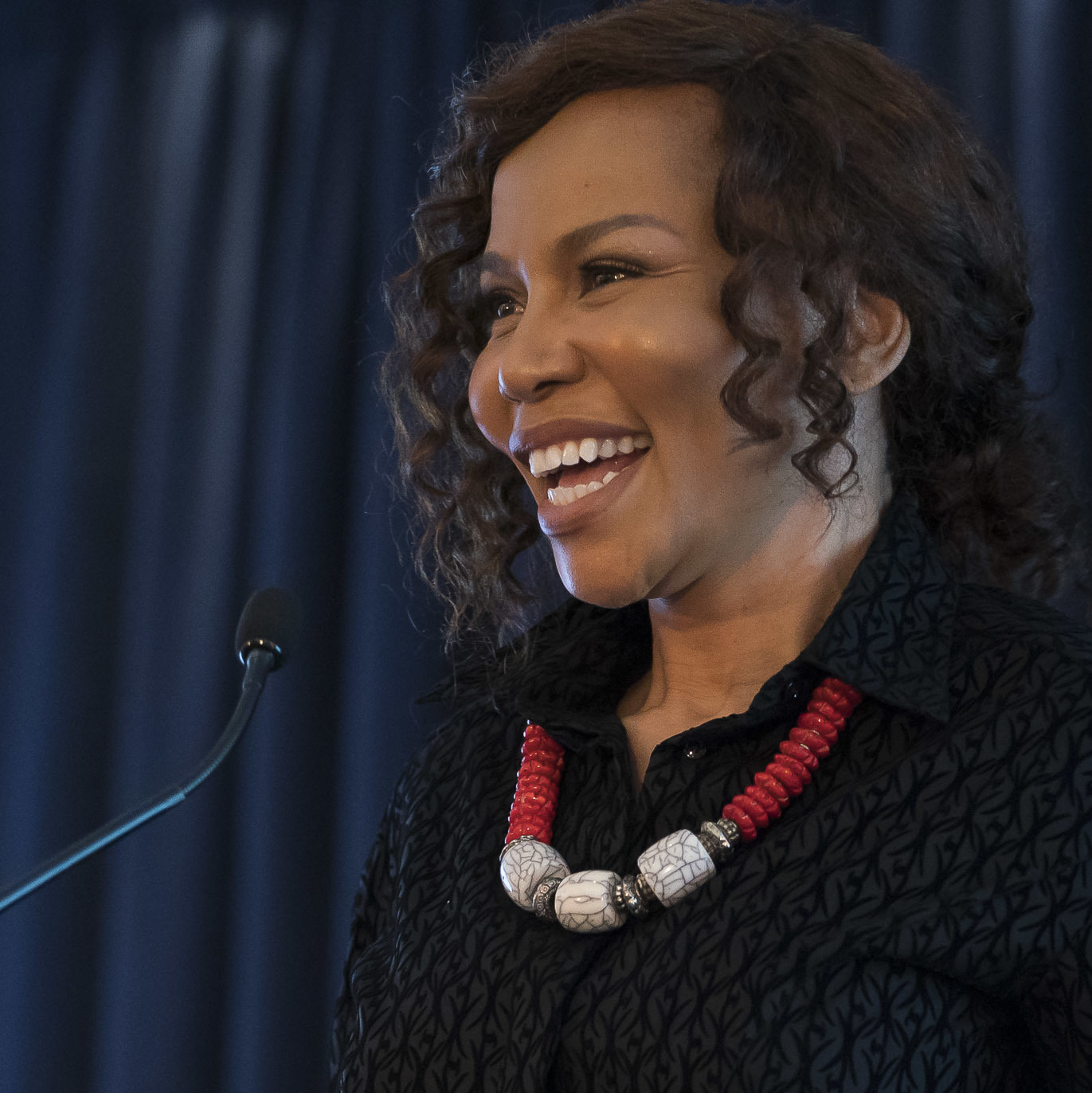
- Moloi-Motsepe in 2019

Chancellor of the University of Cape Town
- Incumbent
- Assumed office 1 January 2020
- Vice-Chancellor: Mamokgethi Phakeng; Daya Reddy (interim); Mosa Moshabela
- Preceded by: Graca Machel

Personal details
- Born: Precious Moloi; 2 August 1962 (age 63) Soweto, South Africa
- Spouse: Patrice Motsepe (m. 1989)
- Children: 3
- Education: Wits University (MBBCh; 1987)
- Occupation: Businesswoman, philanthropist and medical doctor
- Known for: Founder of the African Fashion International
- Website: https://motsepefoundation.org

Precious Moloi-Motsepe (born 2 August 1962) is a South African philanthropist and fashion entrepreneur. One of the richest women in South Africa, she started her career as a medical practitioner, specializing in children and women's health. In September 2019 she was elected Chancellor of the University of Cape Town, succeeding Graça Machel, and beginning her ten-year term on 1 January.

In 2007, she established African Fashion International, an events, fashion and lifestyle company to promote pan-African designers to international audiences, and endorse the African fashion industry as a pathway to economic development for young people and women. In 2013, she joined the Giving Pledge with her husband, committing to give half of their family wealth to charitable causes. In the same year she was on the inaugural cover of Forbes Women Africa and has since been listed as of the 50 most powerful women on the continent by Forbes Magazine Africa.

She is a regular delegate to the World Economic Forum held in Davos, as well as a member of the Harvard Kennedy School Women's Leadership Board. She is a member of the Advisory Board for the Milken Institute's Center for Strategic Philanthropy and the Harvard University Global Advisory Council.

== Early life and education ==
Born in Soweto, one of five siblings, her father was a teacher and her mother a nurse She attended Wits University where she graduated with an MBBCh degree in 1987 and worked in the United States at the Medical College of Virginia in Richmond from 1991 to 1992. Upon her return to South Africa, she pursued a diploma in child health from the University of the Witwatersrand, and a diploma in women's health from Stellenbosch University.

In 1989, she married Patrice Motsepe, a lawyer who was also brought up in Soweto. Forbes Magazine Africa estimated her family's wealth at US$3 billion and noted that they were South Africa's wealthiest black couple. She is of Sotho descent.

== Career ==
In 1993 she opened a women's health clinic in Rivonia, Johannesburg. From 2002 until 2007 she served as President of the Cancer Association of South Africa (CANSA), earning her the Elizabeth Tshabalala Award for her cancer awareness efforts in 2012.

=== Philanthropy ===
She cofounded the Motsepe Foundation with her husband in 1999, with a mission to contribute towards eradicating poverty and to sustainably improve the living conditions and standards of living of poor, unemployed and marginalized people in South Africa, Africa and the world. In 2002 she took over its leadership as Chief Executive Officer and leads five main programmes: education and leadership; gender equality; community development; sport, music and arts; and social cohesion. In 2012, she spearheaded the Gender Responsive Budget Initiative, advocating for reviews and analysis of national plans and budgets to ensure that the needs of women are specifically and equally addressed. The Gender Responsive Budget Initiative has since been adopted by the South African parliament.

In 2015, she and her husband were honored by the Keep a Child Alive Foundation for their efforts addressing the issues of social and economic inequality of Africa's poorest people, and for their generous support of HIV and AIDS initiatives over the years.

In 2017 she published The Precious Little Black Book to empower South African women with information about their rights, health and economic empowerment. Following this, she took over the reins from Melinda Gates as co-chair of the global women's philanthropic organization Maverick Collective in 2018.

In 2020, she donated R5 million to the University of Cape Town through the Motsepe Foundation. The donation, made at the outset of the COVID-19 pandemic, was allocated to assist with university sustainability, as well as the procurement of laptops and data for students to resume learning remotely.

In 2021, she donated a further R2 million to the University of Cape Town through the Motsepe Foundation, to assist students who completed their studies but were unable to graduate and receive their degree certificates because of student debt. In 2023, through the Motsepe Foundation, she extended her support to all 26 South African universities through a R30 million donation for student registration, fees and historical debt.

=== Business ===
In 2007, she conceptualized African Fashion International (AFI) as a socially conscious, luxury African fashion platform that is supposed to propel pan-African designers into international markets and create opportunities for job creation along the supply chain. AFI is best known for its international fashion and lifestyle events production and has since grown into the luxury e-commerce sector as purveyors of fashion and accessories from Africa and the diaspora. Becoming the first fashion week platform on the continent sponsored by Mercedes Benz, the front row of AFI Fashion Week has been graced by Suzy Menkes of Condé Nast International and Fern Mallis of New York Fashion Week.

In 2017, she was the first recipient of the Franca Sozzani Award at the United Nations in New York for her efforts to promote African designers through her firm and support the empowerment of disadvantaged women. In 2022 she was selected to join the BOF Global Fashion Leader Index.

She is an advisor to the Copenhagen Global Fashion Agenda Summit, promoting sustainable investments in fashion; the only representative from Africa.

=== Other interests ===
She has been involved in various cultural sectors in Africa, including fashion, art, music, and sports.

In the fashion industry, she has supported pan-African fashion by promoting African designers and sponsoring industry events. In 2019, she sponsored the Condé Nast International Luxury Conference, which was held in Cape Town for the first time. In 2025, she partnered with the Met Gala, collaborating with Vogue and the Anna Wintour Costume Center on an exhibition exploring Black dandyism.

In sports, she has supported school-level athletics in South Africa through the Kay Motsepe Schools Championship, which includes football and netball competitions involving over 13,000 teams. She has also backed the CAF African Schools Football Championship, which brings together teams from across the continent. Additionally, she has advocated for equal pay in women’s sports, particularly for South Africa’s Banyana Banyana football team.

In music, she has supported the ABC Motsepe Schools Choral Eisteddfod, an annual event involving 4,000 schools in various musical categories.
