= Deborah Posel =

South African sociologist

- Born: 1957 or 1958 (age 67–68)
- Spouse: Max Price

Academic background
- Education: University of the Witwatersrand; Nuffield College, Oxford (PhD)

Academic work
- Discipline: Sociology
- Sub-discipline: Political sociology and historical sociology of South Africa
- Notable works: The Making of Apartheid, 1948–1961: Conflict and Compromise (1991)

Deborah Posel (born 1957 or 1958) is a South African sociologist who is professor emeritus at the University of Cape Town (UCT). She was the founding director of two prominent interdisciplinary research institutes, UCT's Institute for Humanities in Africa (founded 2010) and the Wits Institute for Social and Economic Research (founded 2001). Her academic interests are primarily in the historical sociology of apartheid and the sociology of post-apartheid South Africa.

== Academic background ==
Born in 1957 or 1958 to two academics – an applied mathematician and a historian – Posel graduated from high school at age 16. She studied philosophy at the University of the Witwatersrand (Wits) and in 1981 began a PhD at Nuffield College, Oxford. Her dissertation was about the historical sociology of apartheid and its origins. After completing the degree, she spent stints at Oxford, at Harvard University, and at institutions in South Africa.

== Academic positions ==
In 2001, Posel founded the interdisciplinary Wits Institute for Social and Economic Research (WiSER) at Wits in Johannesburg. At its inception, it had received about R25 million in core donor funding for the first five years, which the Mail & Guardian called an "unprecedented" amount. Under Posel as inaugural director, the institute selected five main research areas: money, race, sexuality, crime, and the state.

Posel announced her resignation from WiSER in early 2009. She joined her husband at the University of Cape Town (UCT), where, the following year, she founded the Institute for Humanities in Africa (HUMA), another interdisciplinary institute straddling UCT's law and humanities faculties. Its primary research themes were "being human" and consumerism, and the founding cohort of scholars included Posel, Shamil Jeppie, Jonny Steinberg, and Natasha Distiller.

Posel was Leverhulme Visiting professor at University College London's Institute of Advanced Studies in 2018–2019. As of 2021, she was professor emeritus at UCT and a research professor in sociology at the University of the Free State. She is a member of the Academy of Science of South Africa.

== Scholarship ==
Posel's PhD dissertation was the basis for her first, widely cited book on the origins of apartheid, The Making of Apartheid, 1948–1961: Conflict and Compromise (1991). According to Hermann Giliomee, "Posel's work opened up a new perspective in depicting apartheid as a policy and ideology largely shaped by post-1948 struggles within the Nationalist movement".

In later years, Posel worked on the sociology of post-apartheid South Africa, with research topics including the Truth and Reconciliation Commission, consumerism, and sexual violence. Also widely cited are a pair of 2001 articles by Posel about racialisation in South Africa during and after apartheid: "Race as Common Sense: Racial Classification in Twentieth-Century South Africa" in the African Studies Review and "What's in a Name? Racial Categorisations under Apartheid and Their Afterlife" in Transformation.

== Personal life ==
Posel is Jewish. She is married to Max Price, the former vice-chancellor of UCT, whom she met at Oxford.
