= Eastwood (surname) =

Eastwood is a surname. According to one account, Eastwood was an English landed gentry family originating from Nottingham, to which belonged the mayor of Dublin in the 17th century, during the reign of Charles II.

== Notable people sharing the surname "Eastwood" ==
- Alice Eastwood (1859–1953), Canadian botanist
- Alison Eastwood (born 1972), American film director and actress
- Arthur Eastwood, New Zealand rower
- Bob Eastwood
- Clint Eastwood, American film director, actor, producer, screenwriter, musician and composer
- Colum Eastwood (born 1983), Northern Irish politician
- Dina Eastwood
- Francesca Fisher-Eastwood
- Freddy Eastwood (born 1983), Welsh international footballer
- Greg Eastwood, New Zealand rugby league footballer
- Jayne Eastwood
- Jim Eastwood, Northern Irish businessman
- John S. Eastwood
- Kathy Eastwood, American astronomer
- Ken Eastwood
- Kyle Eastwood
- Mark Eastwood, British politician
- Mike Eastwood, NHL ice hockey player
- Paul Eastwood, British rugby league footballer
- Ralph Eastwood, British army general during World War II
- Scott Eastwood, American actor and son of Clint Eastwood
- Simon Eastwood (born 1989), English footballer
- Sorcha Eastwood (born 1986), Northern Irish politician
- Tom Eastwood (1922–1999), English composer
