= Eastwood Elementary School =

Eastwood Elementary School may refer to:

- Eastwood Elementary School, Decatur, Alabama - Decatur City Schools
- Eastwood Elementary School, La Mirada, California - Norwalk-La Mirada Unified School District
- Eastwood Elementary School, Westminster, California - Westminster School District
- Eastwood Elementary School, Elkhart, Indiana - Elkhart Community Schools
- Eastwood Elementary School, New Castle, Indiana - New Castle Community School Corporation
- Eastwood Elementary School, West Fargo, North Dakota - West Fargo Public Schools
- Eastwood Elementary School, Hillsboro, Oregon - Hillsboro School District
- Eastwood School, now Lantrip Elementary School, in Houston, Texas
