= Eastwood International School Beirut =

Location
- Sami Solh Street, Mansourieh el Metn; Beirut; Lebanon
- Coordinates: 33.8602294°N 35.5635467°E

Information
- Type: Private international school
- Motto: Children, our Purpose, and our Future
- Established: 1973
- Founder: Amine M. Khoury
- Director: Michel A. Khoury
- Grades: K–12
- Age range: 3–18
- Language: French, English
- Campus type: Urban
- Colors: Teal and Grey
- Accreditation: AdvancED
- Website: www.eastwoodis.com

Eastwood International School is a private international IB World School in Beirut, Lebanon.

== History ==
Initially called Eastwood College, the school was founded in 1973 by Amine M. Khoury in Kafarshima, Lebanon. During the Lebanese civil war, the school was relocated to an area on the outskirts of Beirut called Mansourieh where it has remained. The campus in Mansourieh's name was changed in 2016 to Eastwood International School while the campus in Kafarshima is still known as Eastwood College.

== Accreditation ==
The school is accredited by AdvancED and is an experiential continuum International Baccalaureate World School offering the PYP, MYP and IBDP classes.

== Academic programs ==
Eastwood International School is authorized in the IB Primary Years Programme and the IB Diploma Programme. The school is still in the candidacy phase for the IB Middle Years Programme. The PYP programme is offered in both English and French

The early years classes follow the PYP and Reggio Emilia approach to education.

EIS (formally known as Eastwood College) led Lebanese schools in integrating technology throughout its educational environment, in many aspects of the curriculum replacing physical books with interactive books on tablets.
