= Daya Reddy =

South African engineer

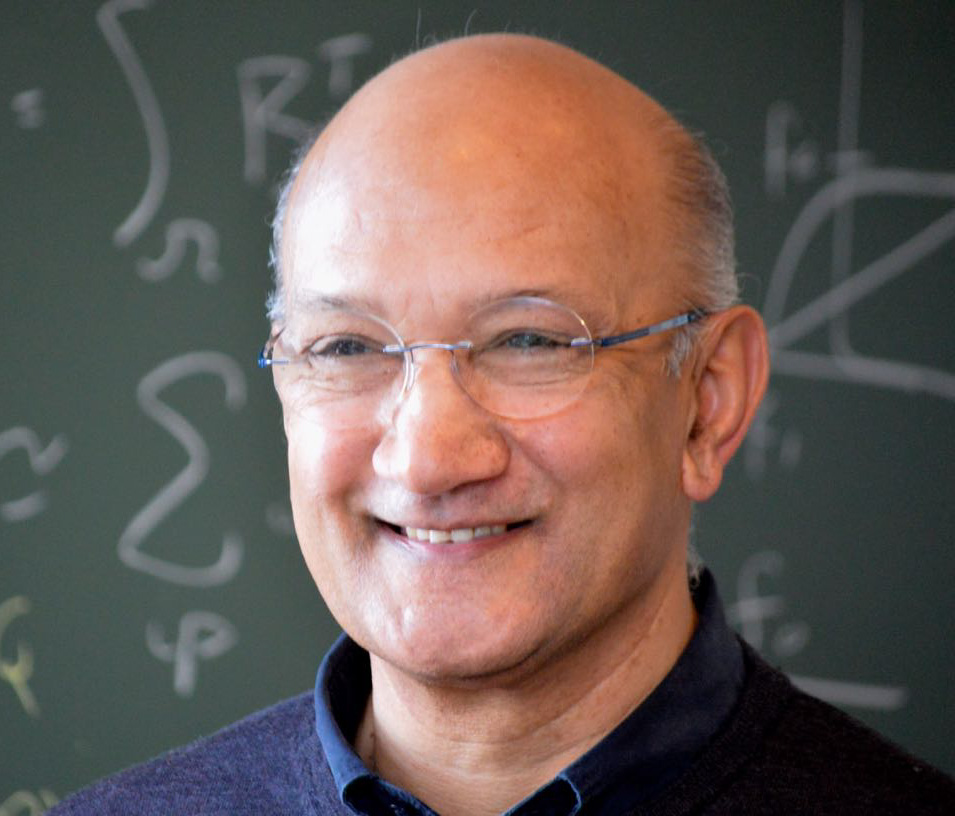
- Reddy in 2018
- Born: 10 March 1953 (age 73); Port Elizabeth, Union of South Africa
- Education: BSc (Eng), University of Cape Town (1973); PhD, Cambridge University (1977)
- Known for: Director, Centre for Research in Computational Mechanics, Former President, International Science Council (2018–2021)
- Scientific career
- Fields: Applied mathematics Computational mechanics Science policy
- Workplaces: University College London; University of Cape Town
- Website: https://www.cerecam.uct.ac.za/people/bdr

Batmanathan Dayanand Reddy (born 10 March 1953) is a South African scientist. He is professor emeritus of applied mathematics and served as interim vice chancellor at the University of Cape Town between March 2023 and July 2024. Reddy held the South African research chair in computational and applied mechanics from 2007 to 2021, and is a former director of the Centre for Research in Computational and Applied Mechanics (CERECAM) there. From 2018 to 2021, he was the inaugural president of the International Science Council.

== Career ==
After completing a bachelor's degree in civil engineering at the University of Cape Town and a PhD degree at Cambridge University, Reddy pursued postdoctoral study at the University College London, then returned to Cape Town, where he migrated eventually from joint appointments in civil engineering and applied mathematics to a chair in applied mathematics.

He served as dean of faculty of science at UCT for seven years from 1999, and thereafter was appointed to the South African Research Chair in Computational and Applied Mechanics.

In 2018, Reddy was elected as first President of the International Science Council.

== Research ==
Reddy's teaching and research activities reflect his multidisciplinary perspectives, which he has pursued largely through the Centre for Research in Computational and Applied Mechanics (CERECAM) at the University of Cape Town, a centre comprising academic staff and their students in five different departments, straddling the engineering disciplines, mathematics, and biomedical sciences.

He has made major contributions to the analysis of problems in solid mechanics, most notably plasticity. He has developed and analysed new variational formulations, as well as associated solution algorithms, which have been implemented computationally, for both classical and gradient theories. The second area in which he has a substantial international reputation is in the development and analysis of mixed and related finite element methods. Beyond these major areas of activity, he has also made significant contributions to aspects of biomedical mechanics.

He is the author, co-author or editor of over 200 publications, including two research monographs, two texts, and three edited volumes of invited papers. He has supervised to graduation 33 PhD and 36 Masters graduates, as well as 20 post-doctoral researchers.

The objective of his graduate text on functional analysis was to address a great need, in providing graduate students and researchers in engineering as well as others who do not have the requisite mathematical background, with an introduction to the mathematics that is essential to the study of boundary value problems and the finite element method. The work continues to be used in universities around the world, either as recommended course text or for individual study and reference.

The first edition of his research monograph, with Weimin Han, comprised a systematic treatment of mathematical aspects of classical plasticity from a modern perspective. The monograph captures the main results of the theoretical work by Reddy and co-workers, and others over a number of years, and goes on to present some new results. The second edition includes new material on single-crystal plasticity and strain-gradient plasticity, to which Reddy has made significant contributions.

== Scientific leadership ==
Reddy was a founder member in 2003, of the African Institute for Mathematical Sciences (AIMS), which has grown from the first institute, established in Cape Town, South Africa, to become a pan-African network with centres for graduate education, research and outreach currently in five African countries. He serves on the AIMS South Africa Council, of which he is a former chair, and is a trustee on the AIMS Trust.

Reddy is a founder member of the Academy of Sciences of South Africa (ASSAf), and served as its President over the period 2012 - 2016.

The InterAcademy Partnership (IAP) is a global network of 140 member academies which work together to provide independent expert advice on scientific, technological and health issues. Reddy served, over the period 2013 - 2019 as co-chair of IAP-Policy, the arm of the IAP that mobilizes the best scientists and engineers worldwide to provide high-quality, in-depth advice to international organizations and national governments on critical scientific issues.

In July 2018, Daya Reddy was elected the first president of the International Science Council, a body that has resulted from the merger of the International Council for Science (ICSU) and the International Social Science Council, and whose membership includes national and regional scientific organizations from 140 countries and more than 40 international scientific unions and associations. The ISC catalyses international scientific collaboration and convenes scientific and policy expertise, advice and influence on issues of major concern to science and society.

== Awards ==
Reddy has the unique distinction of being an elected fellow or member of all four South African academies: the Academy of Science of South Africa (ASSAf), by legislation of the official academy of South Africa; the South African Academy of Engineering; the Royal Society of South Africa; and the Suid-Afrikaanse Akademie vir Wetenskap en Kuns. He is also a Fellow of The World Academy of Sciences (TWAS), of the African Academy of Sciences, and a founding Fellow of the Academy of Engineering and Technology of the Developing World (AETDEW). In 2023 he was appointed a Member of the Pontifical Academy of Sciences, and in 2024 elected an International Honorary Member of the American Academy of Arts and Sciences. In 2025 he was elected a Fellow of the International Core Academy of Sciences and Humanities (CORE Academy).

Reddy is a recipient of the degree of Doctor of Science, honoris causa, from Stellenbosch University; the Award for Research Distinction of the South African Mathematical Society; and the Order of Mapungubwe, awarded by the President of South Africa for distinguished contributions to science. He received the Georg Forster Research Award from the Alexander von Humboldt Foundation in Germany. He was elected a Fellow of the International Association for Computational Mechanics in 2008.

Academic offices
Preceded by Mamokgethi Phakeng	Interim Vice-Chancellor of the University of Cape Town; 2023−2024	Succeeded by Mosa Moshabela
