= EastwoodCo =

Eastwood Company
- Company type: Private
- Industry: Automotive Restoration, automotive tools
- Founded: 1978
- Headquarters: Pottstown, Pennsylvania, United States of America
- Key people: Curt Strohacker, (CEO); Brian Huck, (President)
- Parent: Kian Capital

The Eastwood Company is a seller of automotive restoration products, headquartered in Pottstown, Pennsylvania, United States. The company was funded in 1978. Curt Strohacker.

== History ==
The Eastwood Company began in a garage in suburban Philadelphia in 1978, with the founder, Curt Strohacker, selling buffing wheels and compounds from 1/4-page ads in automotive magazines. Today, the company has a distribution and headquarters facility in Pottstown, Pennsylvania, mailing millions of full-color catalogs annually, and running the Eastwood.com e-commerce website. In 2019, Eastwood Company was acquired by Kian Capital.

== Expansion and growth ==
The first Eastwood catalog featured eight black and white pages of metal finishing equipment. By the early 1980s, the catalog mailing operation entered a professional list house, and reached 5,000 names by 1981. In addition to catalog marketing, Eastwood sold its products directly at selected car shows.

By 1984 and 1985, company ads appeared in more than fifty publications, including Hot Rod, Car Craft, and Popular Mechanics. The catalog grew as well, reaching 96 pages with a four-color cover by 1986, and a circulation of about 100,000 auto restorers, who received six issues per year.

By the end of the 1980s, the Eastwood mailing list reached 500,000.

== Products ==
Eastwood's assortment has grown to include over 5,000 products, such as rust preventatives, specialty coatings, paints, chemicals, powder coating, welding and metal fabrication equipment, and pressure blasters.

== Awards and recognition ==
- 1998: The Pennsylvania Governor's award for "Environmental Excellence
- 1999: Automotive Restoration Market Organization's "Best New Product"
- 2011: Winner of Popular Mechanic's™ Magazine Editor's Choice Award for Product Innovation and Design
- 2012: Winner of Popular Mechanic's Magazine Editor's Choice Award for MIG Spot Weld Kit
