= Kathy Eastwood =

American astronomer

Kathleen DeGioia Eastwood (published as DeGioia-Eastwood) is an American astronomer known for her research on the formation and evolution of massive stars, and for her work on undergraduate education in astronomy. She is a professor emerita of astronomy and planetary science at Northern Arizona University.

== Education and career ==
Eastwood graduated magna cum laude from Dartmouth College in 1976, with a bachelor's degree in physics. She earned her Ph.D. in physics from the University of Wyoming in 1982. Her dissertation, A study of star formation in NGC 6946, was supervised by Gary Grasdalen.

After working as an assistant scientist and instructor in astronomy at the University of Wisconsin from 1983 to 1987, she joined Northern Arizona University as an assistant professor of physics and astronomy in 1988, at the same time beginning her lifelong affiliation with the Lowell Observatory as an adjunct astronomer. She was tenured as an associate professor at Northern Arizona University in 1994, and promoted to full professor in 2001.

Since 1989 she has directed the National Undergraduate Research Observatory at Lowell Observatory. She also directed the Young Scholars in Astronomy program at Northern Arizona University in 1989–1990, and since 1992 has directed Research Experiences for Undergraduates summer programs in astronomy.

== Recognition ==
Eastwood was named a Fulbright Scholar in 2006, funding her travel to the Cerro Tololo Inter-American Observatory in Chile. She was named a Legacy Fellow of the American Astronomical Society in 2020.
