= Chancellor of the University of Cape Town =

The Chancellor of the University of Cape Town is the ceremonial head of the university, representing it in the public sphere and conferring degrees in its name. The Chancellorship is a titular position; the chief executive of the university is the Vice-Chancellor. The current Chancellor, the sixth since the University of Cape Town (UCT) was elevated to university status in 1918, is Precious Moloi-Motsepe. She is succeeding Graça Machel, the wife of South African ex-President Nelson Mandela who served as chancellor from 1999 until 2019. If there are multiple nominations the Chancellor is chosen by an electoral college representing staff, students and graduates. Formerly Chancellors were appointed for life, but since 1999 they are appointed for a renewable ten-year term.

== List of chancellors ==
- 1918–1936: H.R.H. the Prince of Wales (the future Edward VIII)
- 1936–1950: Field Marshal Jan Smuts
- 1950–1967: The Hon. Mr Justice Albert van der Sandt Centlivres
- 1967–1999: Harry Oppenheimer
- 1999–2019: Graça Machel
- 2020–present: Precious Moloi-Motsepe

== See also ==
- Vice-Chancellor of the University of Cape Town
