= Eastwood, Essex =

Suburb of Southend-on-Sea, Essex, England

Coordinates: 51.569°N 0.6636°E

Eastwood
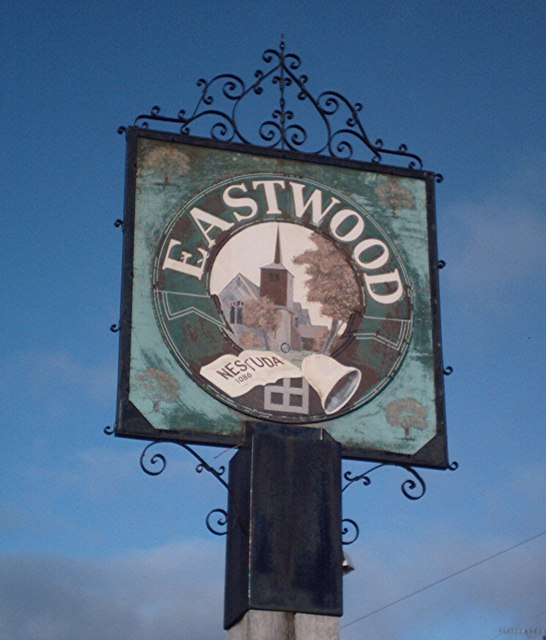
- Village sign, depicting St Laurence Church

- Location within Essex
- Population: 9,364 (2011)
- OS grid reference: TQ832892
- Unitary authority: Southend-on-Sea
- Ceremonial county: Essex
- Region: East
- Country: England
- Sovereign state: United Kingdom
- Post town: LEIGH-ON-SEA
- Postcode district: SS9
- Dialling code: 01702
- Police: Essex
- Fire: Essex
- Ambulance: East of England
- UK Parliament: Southend West

Eastwood is a suburb of the city of Southend-on-Sea, in the ceremonial county of Essex, England. It was formerly a civil parish, the main part of which was absorbed into the municipal borough of Southend-on-Sea in 1933.

It is bordered by Rayleigh to the west, Rochford to the north-east, and Belfairs, part of Leigh-on-Sea, to the south. To the north lies Edwards Hall Park, a large area of open countryside, part of which is farmland. This green space extends all the way to Hockley Woods, and Hockley. There are also several play parks throughout Eastwood.

Eastwood has good bus links to both Southend and the surrounding areas, with popular services including Arriva Southend's route 9 service, and First Essex's route 20 service. The nearby Southend Airport operates a range of European passenger flights. The nearest railway station is Southend Airport on the Great Eastern Main Line with services to London Liverpool Street operated by Greater Anglia. There are currently no buses connecting the north side of Eastwood (north of the A127) with the south side and its administrative town of Leigh-on-Sea.

It is a mainly residential area. The parish is served by the Grade I listed medieval St. Laurence and All Saints Church, Eastwood which sits at the end of the main runway for Southend Airport.

There is some light industry, mainly centred about the A127 dual carriageway and Progress Road industrial estate. There is one secondary school, The Eastwood Academy, a mixed school with about 850 pupils (in 2004). The Eastwood Academy is home to the Eastwood Theatre.

According to figures from Southend Borough Council, Eastwood has half the national average of people having degree-level qualifications, but the number of home-owners is above average.

== History ==
Eastwood took its name from its situation on the eastern side of the woods and parkland of Rayleigh and Thundersley which were part of the Great Forest of Essex. The village is mentioned in the Domesday Book of 1086 as "Estwa", and was held by Swain of Essex, whose father Robert had held it during the reign of Edward the Confessor. Suen's son, Robert of Essex, founded Prittlewell Priory in the year 1100, but his grandson Henry of Essex forfeited all his estates to the Crown in 1163, because of alleged cowardice in battle. After this date the manor was generally held by the Crown.

In the 13th century, the English Kings would often visit the district for hunting, making Hadleigh Castle their residence. Henry VIII was the last king known to have hunted here and Eastwood Lodge was the centre of the last reserved portion of hunting land. In 1536, during the Reformation, the Manor was given by Edward VI to Lord Rich whose descendants became Earls of Warwick, then by marriage it passed to the Earl of Nottingham.

The Bristow family purchased the estate and held it until 1866 when it was sold in lots: "Eastwoodbury", the large house which stood immediately to the east of the Church, was on the site of the original Manor house. It was demolished in 1954.

One can read about the history of Eastwood in Leonard Sellers’ book Eastwood Essex a History. It contains 672 pages, 522 photographs and 56 maps/plans.

In 1931 the parish had a population of 3887. The parish of Eastwood formerly included a detached area on Wallasea Island, some 8 miles (13 km) north-east from the main part of the parish. After the main part of the parish was absorbed into Southend in 1933 the former detached area persisted as a parish called Eastwood until 1946, when it was added to the parish of Canewdon.
