= Hans Thybo =

Danish geophysicist and geologist (born 1954)

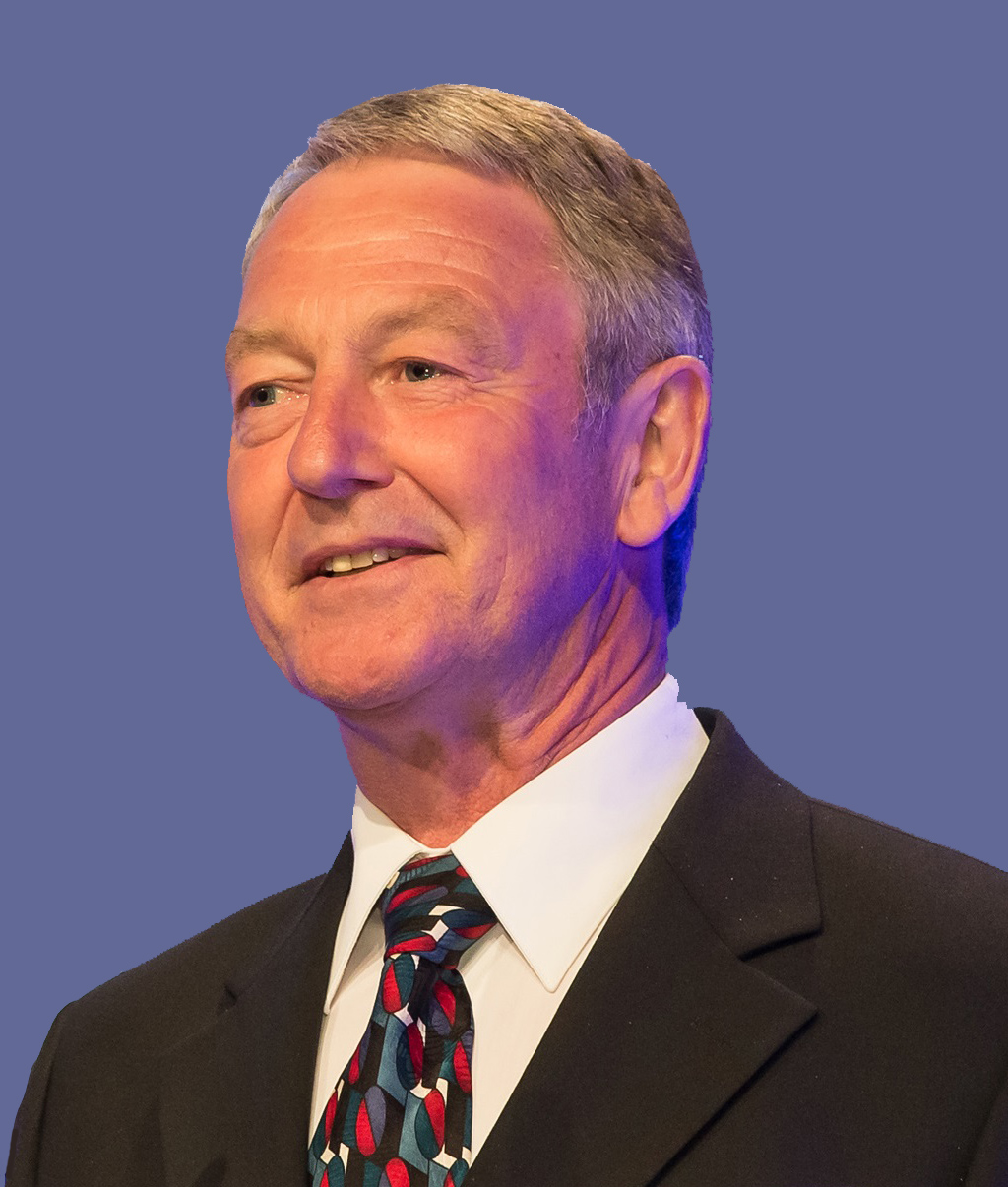
- Born: February 19, 1954; Aarhus, Denmark
- Education: University of Aarhus (BS, MS, PhD)
- Scientific career
- Fields: Geophysics, Geology
- Institutions: Professor at University of Copenhagen until 2017, Professor at Istanbul Technical University, 1000 Talents Professor at China University of Geosciences (Wuhan), Distinguished Professor at SinoProbe Laboratory of Chinese Academy of Geological Sciences

Hans Thybo (born 19 February 1954) is a Danish geophysicist and geologist. He is President of International Lithosphere Program since 2017 and currently employed by the Chinese Academy of Geological Sciences (CAGS).

== Early life and education ==
In 1978, Thybo earned a Bachelor of Science (BSc) degree in Mathematics and Physics from Aarhus University, Denmark. In 1980, he completed his studies at the Delft University of Technology, the Netherlands. He earned two more degrees from Aarhus University: a Master of Science (MSc) in geophysics in 1982 and a PhD in geology in 1987.

== Professional career ==
Hans Thybo was a professor of geophysics at the Geological Institute and the Institute for Geography and Geology at the University of Copenhagen for 33 years, as well as at the Centre for Earth Evolution and Dynamics. at University of Oslo. He is a professor at the Eurasia Institute of Earth Sciences at Istanbul Technical University, a 1000 Talents Professor at the School of Earth Sciences at China University of Geosciences, Wuhan, and a Distinguished Professor at SinoProbe Laboratory at Chinese Academy of Geological Sciences, Beijing. He was elected head of department at the Geological Institute and member of the board of Geocenter Copenhagen.

He was a professor at Department of Geosciences and Natural Resource Management until he was dismissed from his chair in 2016 for allegedly pressuring a postdoc to criticize department management and for using his personal email for work purposes. Thybo disputed the causes of his firing, and the researcher in question stated that he did not feel pressured. Thybo challenged the dismissal in court, which ruled the dismissal illegal, but the case was settled with Thybo receiving six months salary, which was the maximum possible according to the mutual agreement between Thybo's professional organisation and the University of Copenhagen, whereas the agreement did not allow for a verdict that the illegally dismissed professor should be reinstated into his position.

Hans Thybo has published more than 250 papers in international peer-reviewed journals and has been promoter of more than 40 PhD, 80 MSc and 50 BSc students. He has been leader of several geoscientific research programmes and he has been field expedition leader to e.g. the ice sheet in Greenland, east Africa and Siberia. He initiated several pan-European research programmes with east–west collaboration after the end of the cold war. His research includes the discovery of ca. 2 billion year old plate tectonic structures, the fundamental Mid-Lithospheric Discontinuity of the lithospheric mantle, the presence of molten rocks at the Core-Mantle Discontinuity at ca. 3000 km depth below Siberia, a new model for the formation of the economically important sedimentary basins, Presence of strong seismic anisotropy in cratonic crust with the implication that crust and mantle have been coupled for billions of years, and the presence of a hitherto unknown type of crust in Tibet.

=== Positions ===
- 2000–2002: President, seismology division of the European Geophysical Society (EGS)
- 2002–2007: Founding member and President, seismology division of the European Geosciences Union (EGU)
- 2004–2008: External member, board of the Faculty of Mathematics and Natural Sciences, University of Oslo
- 2006–2017: Danish representative, International Committee of Scientific Unions (ICSU)
- 2007–2012: General secretary, European Geosciences Union
- 2010–2016: Board, European Plate Observatory System (EPOS)
- 2010–present: Board, International Lithosphere Programme (ILP)
- 2011–2017: Vice president, Royal Danish Academy of Sciences and Letters
- 2013 & 2017: Vice president, European Geosciences Union
- 2013–2017: Overseas expert, Chinese Academy of Sciences (CAS)
- 2013–present: Nomination committee, Albert Einstein Award of the World Cultural Council
- 2014–present: Board, Danish Academy of Natural Sciences
- 2014–2016: President, European Geosciences Union
- 2015–2017: President-elect, International Lithosphere Program (ILP)
- 2017–present: President, International Lithosphere Program
- 2017–present: Chair, Inge Lehmann Foundation
- 2018–2021: Chair for five panels at the FCT – Portuguese Research Council
- 2019–present: Science Advisory Board for Deep-time Digital Earth of IUGS, since 2023 chair of the Science Committee.
- 2019–present: Member of the Committee for Freedom and Responsibility in Science in the International Science Council
- 2020–present: Editor-in-Chief of EPSL (Earth and Planetary Science Letters)
- 2021–present: Employed on a 5-year contract by the Chinese Academy of Geological Sciences (CAGS)

Member of several foreign research councils, panels and committees in e.g. USA (NSF), Sweden (VR), International Continental Drilling Program (ICDP), Netherlands, Croatia, France, Canada and China.

== Honours ==
Thybo is President of International Lithosphere Program (ILP) og was earlier President for European Geosciences Union, where he also held posts as General Secretary and President for the Seismology Division. He has been chair for the Danish national committee for ICSU (International Council for Science). He is currently a member of Committee for Freedom and Responsibility in Science of ISC (International Science Council). He is member of and was earlier Vicepresident of Royal Danish Academy of Science and Letters. He has received the 1000 Talents Award from China and he is fellow of Royal Astronomical Society, London and Geological Society of America. He is elected member of Academia Europaea, the Norwegian Academy of Sciences and Letters and Danish Academy of Natural Sciences, and he has been Danish representative to International Council for Science (ICSU). He is elected a Fellow of the International Core Academy of Sciences and Humanities in 2025.

=== Awards ===
- 1998: Elected member of the Royal Danish Academy of Sciences and Letters
- 2004: Fellow of the Royal Astronomical Society, London
- 2004: Elected member of the Academia Europaea
- 2010: Elected member of the Norwegian Academy of Sciences and Letters
- 2012: Elected member of the Danish Academy of Natural Sciences
- 2014: Fellow of the Geological Society of America
- 2016: Honorary editor of the scientific journal Tectonophysics
- 2018: Thousand Talents Award
- 2024: Friendship Award from the Chinese Government
- 2025: Elected fellow of the International Core Academy of Sciences and Humanities
