= Max Price =

South African medical academic

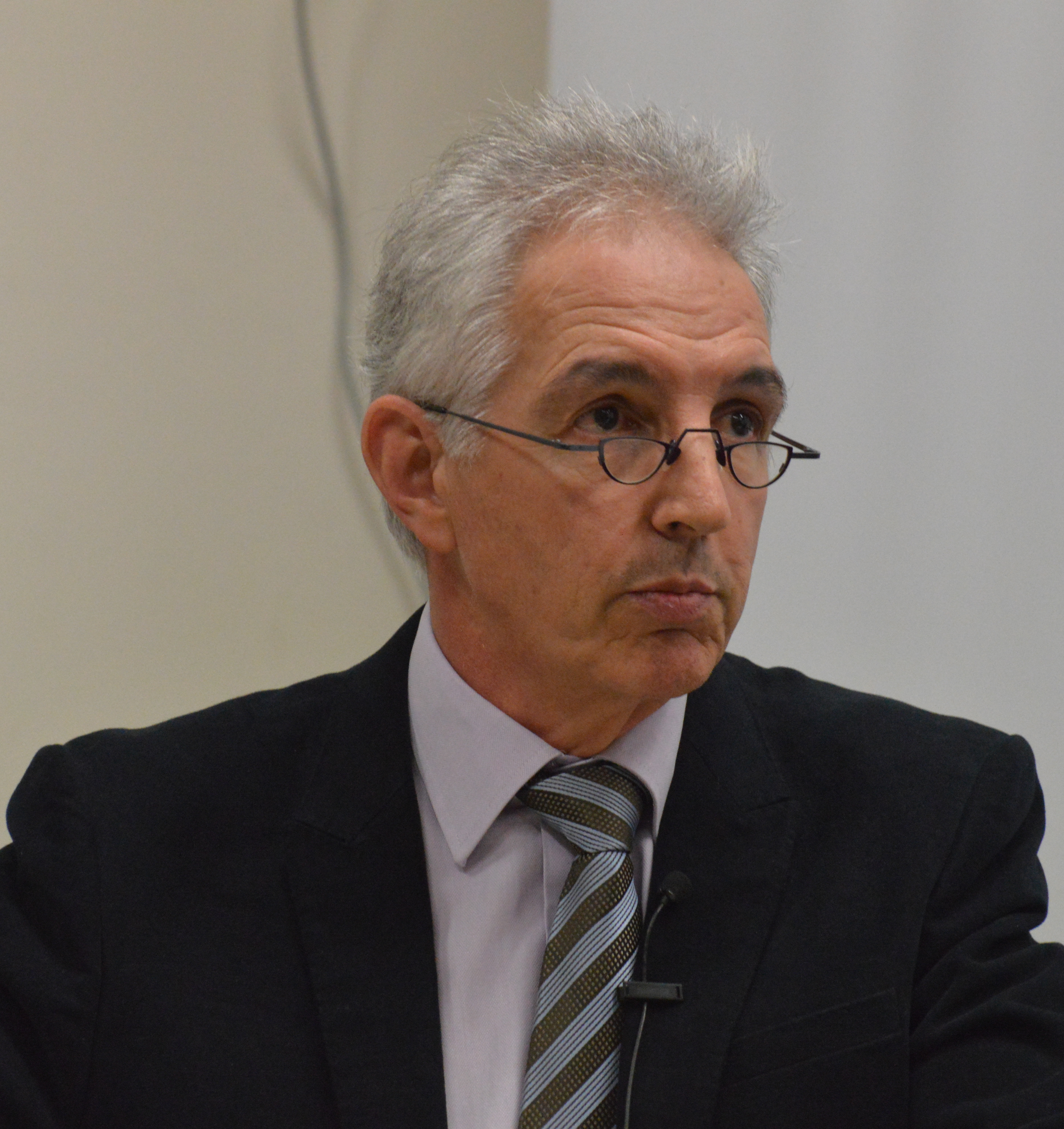
- Max Price whilst Vice Chancellor of UCT in 2015.
- Born: Johannesburg
- Education: University of the Witwatersrand, Oxford University, London School of Hygiene and Tropical Medicine
- Occupation: Former vice-chancellor of the University of Cape Town
- Spouse: Deborah Posel
- Children: 2

Max Price served as the vice-chancellor and principal of the University of Cape Town (UCT) in South Africa, succeeding Njabulo Ndebele. He held this position for a decade, from 19 August 2008, until 30 June 2018.

== Education and career ==
Max Price, a qualified medical doctor, formerly held the position of Dean of the Faculty of Health Sciences at the University of the Witwatersrand. His academic qualifications include an MBBCh degree from the University of the Witwatersrand (1979), a BA (Hons) PPE from Oxford University (1983), an M.Sc. in Community Health from the London School of Hygiene and Tropical Medicine, and a Diploma in Occupational Health from Wits University.

== Student years and activism ==
During his student years, Price served as President of the Student Representative Council at Wits University, a period marked by student protests in South Africa. He also held an executive position in NUSAS.

During the organization of the first anniversary commemorations of the Soweto Uprising, Price was arrested and detained in solitary confinement for 12 days at John Vorster Square.

Price received a Rhodes Scholarship to Oxford University from 1981 to 1983.

== Post-apartheid policy-making ==
In 1988, Price became part of the newly established Centre for Health Policy in South Africa, which aimed to develop post-apartheid health policies. In 1992, he chaired the first Steering Committee of the National Progressive Primary Health Care Network (NPPHCN) / South African Health and Social Services Organisation (SAHSSO) Policy Conference.

Price holds an h-index of 16 according to Google Scholar. Their body of work spans across various domains including health systems research, political economy of health, health economics and financing, privatisation and medical aids, and medical education, encompassing journal articles, technical papers, and media contributions.

Price served as Dean of the Faculty of Health Sciences at Wits University from 1996 to 2006. In 1997, the Faculty submitted a report to the Truth and Reconciliation Commission (TRC) and conducted an internal reconciliation process, inviting black alumni to share their experiences of medical training during apartheid.

As Dean, Price oversaw several initiatives, including the Internal Reconciliation Commission, the introduction of a graduate entry medical program, and the development of academic programs in rural health, bioethics, sports medicine, emergency medicine, and biomedical sciences. Additionally, Price was instrumental in establishing The Wits Donald Gordon Medical Centre, the country's first university-owned private teaching hospital, and Wits Health Consortium, the first university research company in South Africa.

In 2004, Price was appointed an Honorary Fellow Ad Eundum of the Colleges of Medicine of South Africa in Public Health Medicine. Between 2006 and 2008, Price held a position on the board of directors of the Aurum Institute for Health Research, a non-profit organization focusing on AIDS and tuberculosis research.

== Vice-Chancellor of UCT ==
Price was installed as vice-chancellor of the University of Cape Town (UCT) on 19 August 2008. During his tenure, UCT established several new institutes and initiatives, including the Hasso Plattner School of Design Thinking, the Nelson Mandela School of Public Governance, and the Global Citizen Initiative. During Price's tenure, the institution saw significant growth in research output and impact. The number of peer-reviewed publications increased by 85%, the number of National Research Foundation-rated researchers doubled, and there was a 43% increase in the number of master's and doctoral students. Additionally, the university experienced growth in international student numbers and research collaborations, as well as a threefold increase in research income.

During Price's tenure, the University of Cape Town became the first university on the African continent to offer massive open online courses (MOOCs). The institution consistently ranked among the world's top 200 universities according to the Times Higher Education rankings and was frequently recognized as Africa's top university in various rankings.

During Price's tenure, the Vice-Chancellor Strategic Initiatives were launched to address critical national challenges through university-wide, cross-disciplinary research. These initiatives included the African Climate and Development Initiative, the Safety and Violence Initiative, the Poverty and Inequality Initiative, and the Schools Improvement Initiative.

In 2015, Price co-founded and served as the first Chair of the African Research Universities Alliance, which was established to strengthen links between research universities in Africa. He was also a member of the Global Universities Leaders' Forum of the World Economic Forum and served on the Board of Directors of the Community Organisation Resources Centre (CORC).

Fees Must Fall movement

From 2015 to 2017, the University of Cape Town witnessed a series of student and worker protests that were part of a broader national protest movement. The protests centered around several key issues, including the demand for free education (#FeesMustFall), calls for decolonization and transformation (#RhodesMustFall), and union demands for the re-insourcing of outsourced workers.

During his tenure as vice-chancellor, Price's leadership in addressing the protests received both criticism and praise from various quarters. Some critics accused Price of displaying a "gross lack of leadership," while others questioned the necessity of using private security and police to manage the protests. Price's decisions during this period and their perceived negative impact on the status and functioning of UCT as an institution have been discussed in David Benetar's book, The Fall of the University of Cape Town: Africa's Leading University in Decline.

On a national scale, the #FeesMustFall movement resulted in a government commitment to provide grants to fully fund university education for students from lower-income households (earning below R350,000 annually). At the University of Cape Town (UCT), the movement prompted the removal of the statue of Cecil John Rhodes from its central location on campus. Additionally, the movement led to the insourcing of 1300 workers, including cleaners, drivers, security personnel, and residence kitchen staff, who were previously outsourced.

Recent Memberships

Price assumed the role of Chair of the Worldwide Universities Network (WUN) Partnership Board from 2014 to 2016 and served as Vice-Chair during the periods of 2013-2014 and 2016-2017.

From 2011 to 2018, Price held a position as a Member of the Council (Governing Body) of the University of Ghana, Legon. Additionally, from 2014 to 2018, he served as a Member of the Global Council of Hanban, the Headquarters of the Confucius Institutes, as one of ten university presidents who constituted its external members.

Price presently serves on a panel of senior external experts chosen for the Expert Commission of Fondation Botnar. This foundation offers funding opportunities for research and innovation aimed at benefiting children and young people.

== Works ==
- Price, Max (August 2023). Statues and Storms: Leading through change. NB Publishers. ISBN 9780624087762.

Academic offices
Preceded by Njabulo Ndebele	Vice-Chancellor of the University of Cape Town; 2008 – 2018	Succeeded by Mamokgethi Phakeng
