= The Eastwood Academy =

Location
- Rayleigh Road; Leigh-on-Sea, Essex, SS9 5UU; United Kingdom
- Coordinates: 51°33′49″N 0°39′54″E

Information
- Type: Academy
- Local authority: Southend-on-Sea
- Department for Education URN: 137284 Tables
- Ofsted: Reports
- Headteacher: David Piercey
- Gender: Coeducational
- Age: 11 to 16
- Enrolment: 944 (as of 2017)
- Houses: Elevedon; Sherwood; Kielder; Bowland; Ashdown; Whinfell; Richmond
- Colours: Red, Gold and Black
- Website: http://eastwoodacademy.co.uk/index.php

The Eastwood Academy (formerly The Eastwood School) is a secondary school in Leigh-on-Sea, Essex.

== Notable pupils ==
Celtic footballer Cameron Carter-Vickers is a former pupil of the school.

Southend United footballer Jack Bridge is a former pupil of the school.
