= Eastwood, Pretoria =

Eastwood
- Location within Gauteng Location within South Africa
- Coordinates: 25°48′52″S 28°16′0″E
- Country: South Africa
- Province: Gauteng
- Municipality: City of Tshwane
- Main Place: Pretoria

Area
  - Total: 1.39 km^{2} (0.54 sq mi)

Population (2011)
  - Total: 947
  - Density: 681/km^{2} (1,760/sq mi)

Racial makeup (2011)
  - Black African: 33.2%
  - Coloured: 1.7%
  - Indian/Asian: 8.8%
  - White: 46.7%
  - Other: 9.6%

First languages (2011)
  - Afrikaans: 33.7%
  - English: 28.3%
  - Zulu: 6.2%
  - Northern Sotho: 5.6%
  - Other: 26.2%
- Time zone: UTC+2 (SAST)
- Postal code (street): 0083

Eastwood is a suburb in Pretoria, South Africa.
