= Archie Mafeje =

South African anthropologist and activist (1936–2007)

Archie Mafeje FAAS
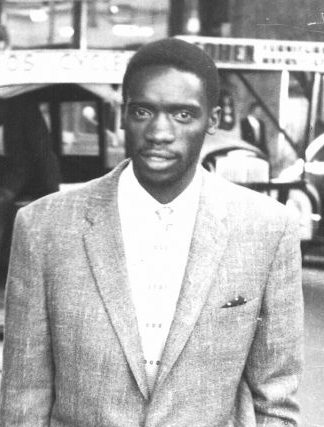
- Archie Mafeje in 1961
- Born: Archibald Boyce Monwabisi Mafeje; 30 March 1936; Gubenxa, Ngcobo (Thembuland), Cape Province, Union of South Africa
- Died: 28 March 2007 (aged 70); Pretoria, Gauteng, South Africa
- Resting place: Ncambele, Tsolo, South Africa
- Citizenship: South African; Dutch
- Education: Nqabara Secondary School; Healdtown Comprehensive School; University of Cape Town (BA, MA); King's College, University of Cambridge (PhD)
- Known for: Mafeje Affair; Anti-apartheid movement Decolonisation of African anthropology
- Spouse: Shahida El Baz
- Scientific career
- Fields: Social anthropology Political Anthropology; Urban Sociology; African history
- Workplaces: University of Dar Es Salaam; Institute of Social Studies; CODESRIA; University of Namibia; American University in Cairo
- Thesis: Social and Economic Mobility in a Peasant Society: A Study of Commercial Farmers in Buganda (1968)
- Doctoral advisor: Audrey Richards
- Other academic advisors: Monica Wilson (MA)

Archibald Boyce Monwabisi Mafeje (30 March 1936 – 28 March 2007), commonly known as Archie Mafeje, was a South African anthropologist and activist. Born in what is now the Eastern Cape, he received degrees from the University of Cape Town (UCT) and the University of Cambridge. He became a professor at various universities in Europe, North America, and Africa. He spent most of his career away from apartheid South Africa after he was blocked from teaching at UCT in 1968.

In exile, Mafeje participated in anti-apartheid activism. His work in anthropology was closely tied to his political activism, and he used his scholarship as a tool to critique the social and economic structures that underpinned the apartheid system in South Africa. He was particularly interested in land ownership and resource allocation issues, and argued that apartheid was built on a foundation of unjust land distribution and exploitation.

A Marxist, Mafeje as a social theorist was known for his critiques of colonialism, apartheid, and other forms of oppression in Africa. A prominent member of the African left, he was critical of Western academic traditions and argued for developing an African-centered approach to social theory and anthropology. Mafeje's Marxist perspective and his contributions to African social theory have impacted scholarship and activism in Africa and beyond. His work has influenced debates about African identity, autonomy, and independence.

== Life and career ==
=== Early life and education ===
Archibald Boyce Monwabisi Mafeje was born on 30 March 1936 in Gubenxa, a remote village in the Ngcobo (Thembuland), Cape Province, Union of South Africa. The Mafeje isiduko (clan name) comes from the Mpondomise, a Xhosa sub-ethnic group. His father, Bennett, was the headmaster of Gubenxa Junior School, and his mother, Frances Lydia, was a teacher. His parents were married in Langa, Cape Town, in 1934, before moving to Gubenxa, and later to the village of Ncambele in Tsolo. Both were members of the Wesleyan Methodist Church. Archie was the oldest of 7 siblings, the others being Vuyiswa (born 1940), Mbulezi (born 1942), (Note: Also known as Keke. Mbulezi was adopted by Bennett's friend, who had no children of his own. It is usual among the Xhosa people to entrust a close family friend with one's own child.) Khumbuzo or Sikhumbuzo (born 1944), Mzandile or Mlamli (born 1947), Thozama (born 1949), and Nandipha (born 1954).

In 1951 and 1952, Mafeje completed his Junior Certificate at Nqabara Secondary School, a Methodist missionary school in Willowvale. There, Nathaniel Honono, the school's headmaster and leader of the Cape African Teachers' Association (CATA), introduced Mafeje and other pupils to the politics of the Non-European Unity Movement (renamed Unity Movement of South Africa in 1964). The school was perceived as one of the best black secondary schools in South Africa; however, following the Bantu Education Act of 1953, the apartheid government later took over the school in 1956.

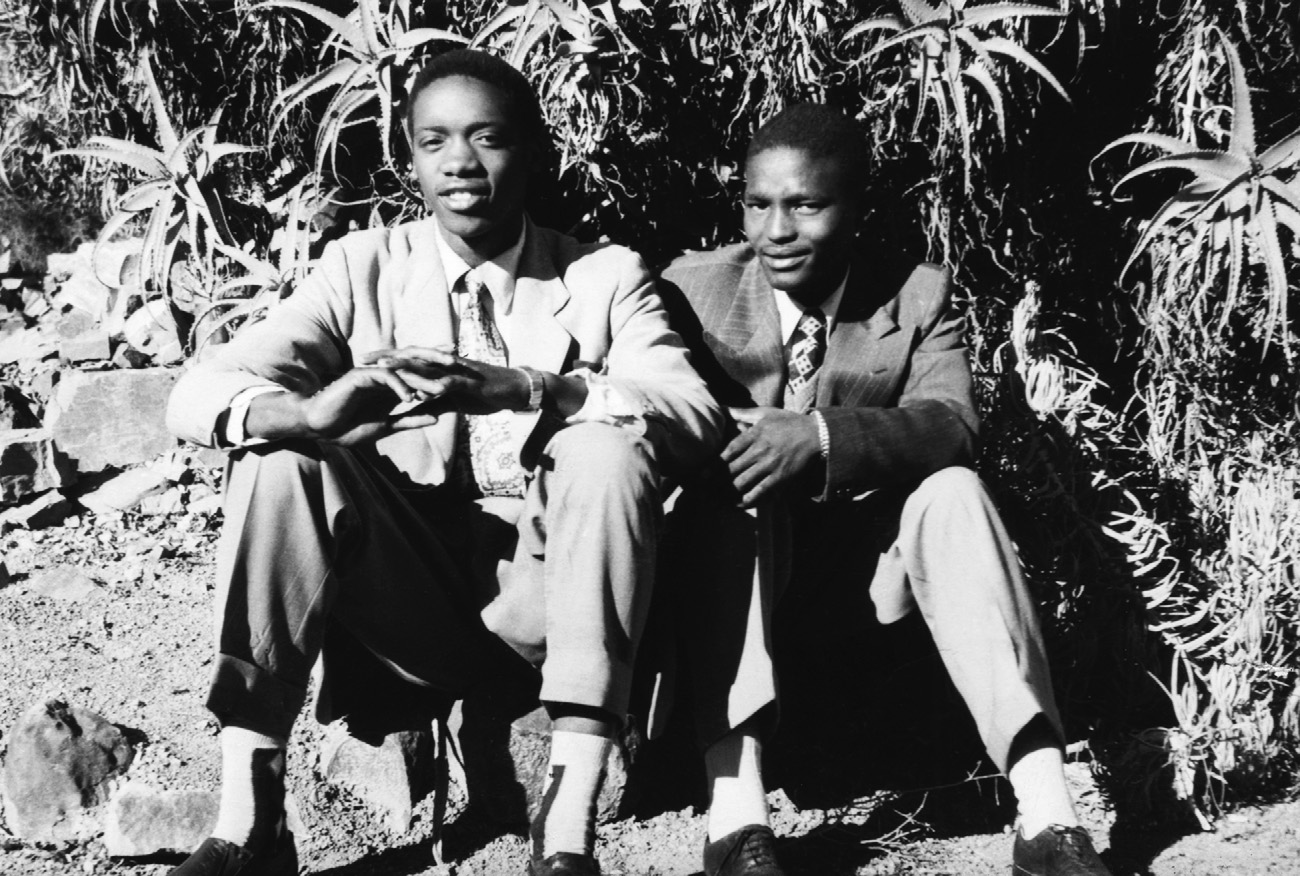
Archie Mafeje and Hudson Matabese in the early 1950s during his years at Healdtown Comprehensive School

Mafeje then matriculated in 1954 to Healdtown Comprehensive School in Fort Beaufort, a Methodist missionary with a list of alumni that includes Nelson Mandela and Robert Sobukwe. There, Mafeje was deeply influenced by Livingstone Mqotsi, a history teacher, and started participating actively in groups connected to the Non-European Unity Movement. Bongani Nyoka asserts that at Healdtown, Archie became a radical atheist. Mafeje joined the Fort Hare Native College, a black university in Eastern Cape, in mid-1955 to study zoology, but he left after one year. (Note: Some sources claim that he was expelled for encouraging political activities, while Ntsebeza claims that Mafeje failed his tests.)

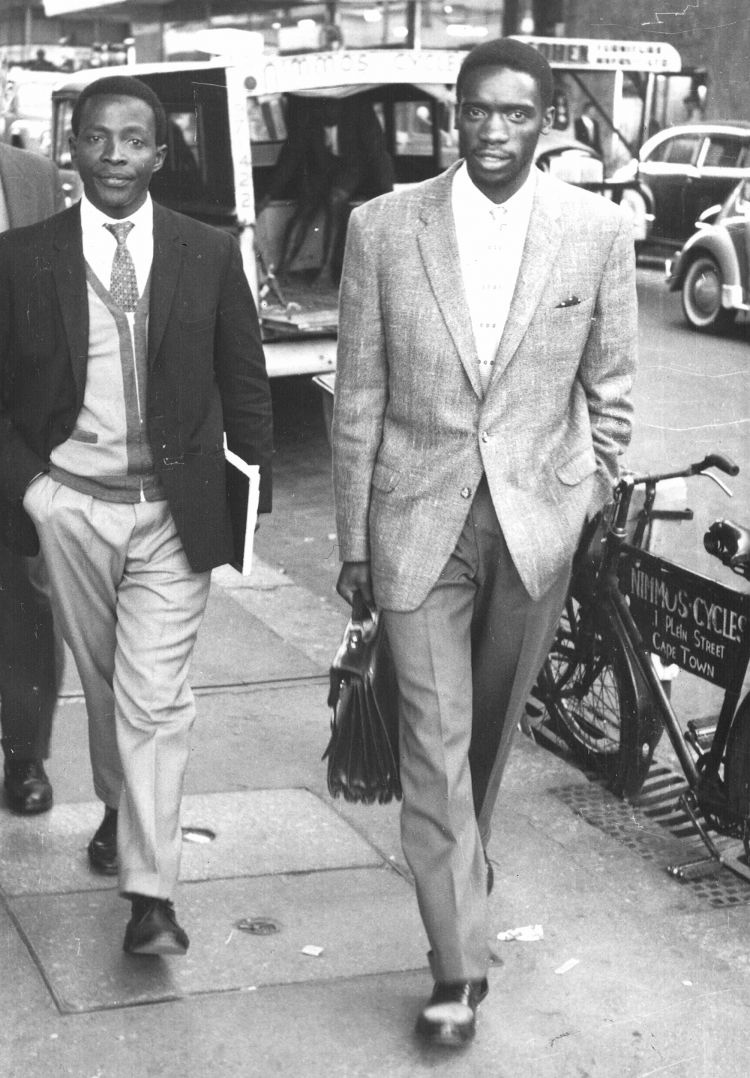
Archie Mafeje (right) with Welsh Makanda on Adderley Street in Cape Town in 1961

Mafeje enrolled in the University of Cape Town (UCT) in 1957, joining a minority of less than twenty non-white students on a campus of five thousand. At UCT, he initially enrolled for a Bachelor of Science (BSc) in biology but failed to pass the required courses. Mafeje recalled that as a biology student in the late 1950s, he was taught the same [racist attitudes] by my white professors who nonetheless regarded him as "the other". He switched to studying social anthropology in 1959. In 1960, he completed a Bachelor of Arts in urban Sociology with honours, followed by a Master of Arts (MA) with distinction in political anthropology, before leaving the university in 1963. At UCT, he was part of the Society of Young Africa (SOYA) and the Cape Peninsula Student Union (CPSU). Francis Wilson (the son of his future mentor and supervisor, Monica Wilson), Fikile Bam and Mafeje held political debates with other students at the "Freedom Square" below the Jameson Hall steps. While they were compelled to read Lenin and Trotsky for their degree, Fikile Bam remembered that Mafeje would frequently refer to Lenin in their theoretical and political disputes while being able to quote the exact passages down to the page numbers. Nonetheless, Mafeje's friends recalled that certain SOYA members found his intellectualism and preference for theoretical argument irritating because they believed he spent too much time "hobnobbing with whites".

Monica Wilson supervised Mafeje's master's project. Mafeje used his knowledge of the Xhosa language and his father's connections (Note: Mafeje's father taught at Langa High School in the 1930s.) to complete fieldwork in Langa between November 1960 and September 1962. Mafeje published part of this independently, and then Monica Wilson wrote a scientific paper based on the work titled Langa: A Study of Social Groups in an African Township, published as a book by Oxford University Press in 1963. However, in the early 1970s, as Mafeje's critique of Western anthropology increased, Mafeje would distance himself from the book, and pointed to Wilson's underlying Christian liberal ideology and liberal functionalism as limitations that favoured Eurocentric theoretical approaches. Mafeje also completed fieldwork about the 1960s elections and political processes in the area for Gwendolen M. Carter.

On 16 August 1963, Mafeje spoke to a group that was gathered illegally and as a result was detained. He was sent to Flagstaff to stand trial. He was fined and sent back to Cape Town instead of being prosecuted. Mafeje then moved to the UK initially as a research assistant at the University of Cambridge after being recommended by Wilson, but then completed a Doctor of Philosophy in social anthropology under Audrey Richards' supervision at King's College, University of Cambridge, in the late 1960s. (Note: The year is disputed as some sources mention 1966, 1968, or 1969.) While working on his PhD, he lived in Uganda and carried out surveys on African farmers, while also working as visiting lecturer at Makerere University. His doctoral thesis was titled Social and Economic Mobility in a Peasant Society: A Study of Commercial Farmers in Buganda.

Richards had doubts about Mafeje's work ethic (Note: Richards said, "I don't understand what is holding him up. He is quick and brilliant in discussion and a popular supervisor — always impresses newcomers. Yet he seems unable to read a document and get anything out of it ... His stuff is like a clever man who isn't working, but his fellows say (unprovoked) that he is an obsessional worker!") and ability to be an academic, (Note: Richards said, "In spite of his quickness and ability, I know for certain now that Archie has no academic gifts although I think he will do well in an organizing job at a university because of his charm of manner, quickness and enthusiasm".) particularly when handling theories, text analysis, and fieldwork. A letter by Mafeje to Richards after his PhD speaks to their relationship:

Although personally you are not to blame and, in fact, you did everything to help, you are associated with this experience in Cambridge. Your frequent charge that I was ungrateful to you for the various things you had done for me ... did not make me feel any better. As a matter of fact, I began to wonder why you continued to help at all if that is what you felt about things. Whatever your complaints, one thing certain is that you knew from me that I was fully aware and appreciative of everything you have done for me. But for my own reasons, I was not going to allow myself to be "adopted" by anybody.

=== The Mafeje affair ===
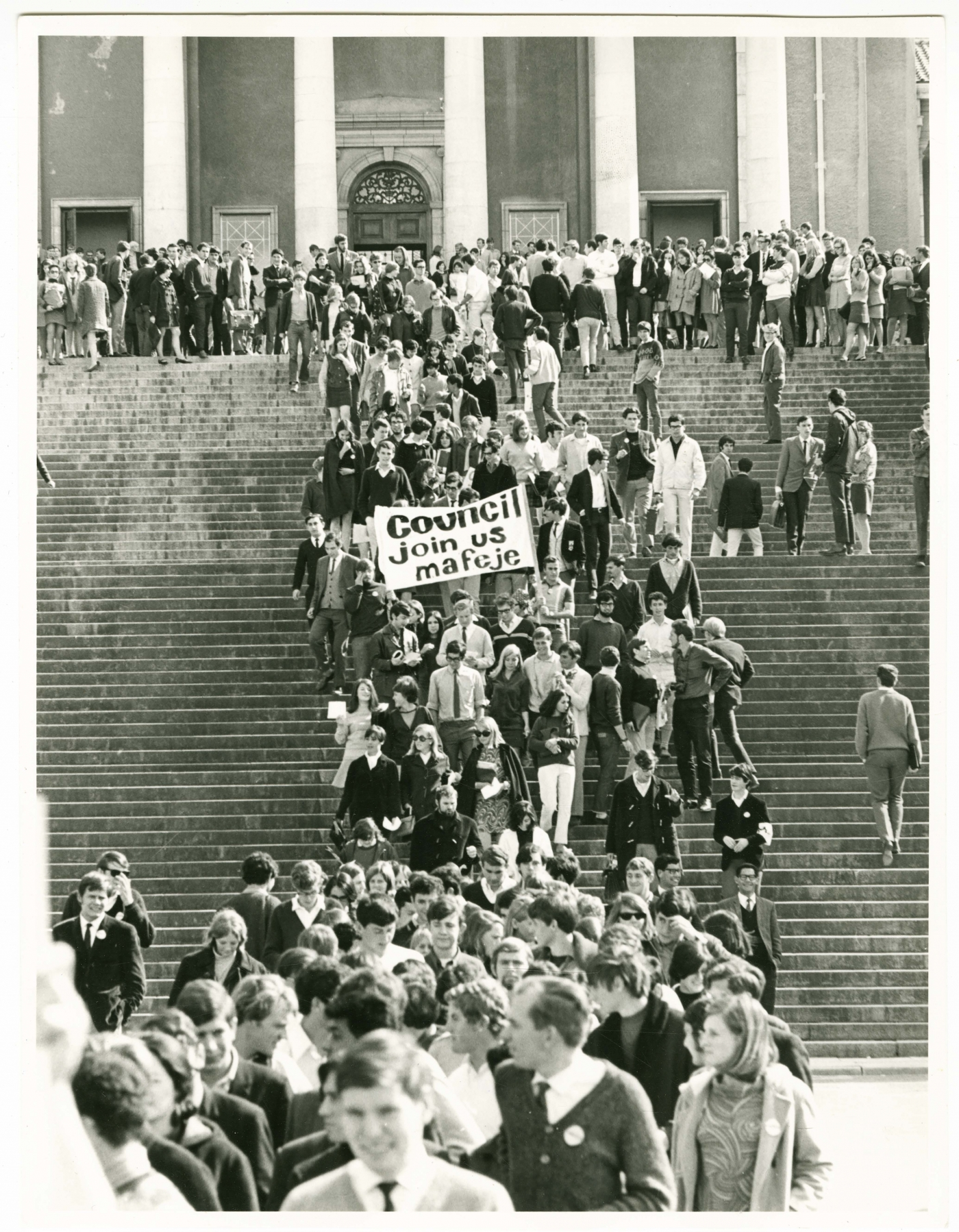
On 15 August 1968, UCT's students descending to the Bremner Building after surrounding Jameson Hall (today's Sarah Baartman Hall)

Mafeje sought to return to UCT and applied for a senior lecturer post that UCT widely advertised in August 1967. He was unanimously offered a post as senior lecturer of social anthropology by the UCT Council. By law, the UCT could only admit white students unless suitable courses were not available at black universities. Still, the law did not explicitly bar UCT from hiring non-white faculty. Mafeje was scheduled to start in May 1968, but the UCT Council withdrew Mafeje's employment offer because the government threatened to cut funding and impose sanctions on UCT should it appoint him.

The council's decision angered UCT's students and led to protests followed by a sit-in, on 15 August 1968, to pressure the council to reverse the decision. The sit-in gained international coverage and was considered part of the global protests of 1968 that received support from students mounting barricades in Paris and London. However, after nine days, the protest crumbled when counter-protesters stormed the building with weapons and dogs while the photos of some of the protesters were passed around to identify targets for the counter-protesters. Students who participated in the sit-in later insisted that they had never met Mafeje and never sought to learn what had become of him. Ntsebeza asserts that, in the eyes of the students, the Mafeje affair was not about Mafeje, the individual, but rather about academic freedom and the autonomy of universities.

In an interview in London, Mafeje said "the whole thing is so superficial. The students talk about this university autonomy business. But do they think they can have a free university in a society that is not free". He continued, 'Suppose I had been allowed to join the faculty of Cape Town University would they have protested against the fact that I would be forced to live off the campus? ... that I would have to have a permit to stay in Cape town? So long as I can sit with them for a few hours a day in the university canteen, many of them would call that academic freedom." However, Mafeje was surprised by the number of protesters.

Mafeje pursued a career abroad. In the 1990s, during the negotiations to end apartheid, UCT would offer Mafeje his 1968 senior lecturer position on a one-year contract, but he declined the position as he was already a well-established professor. Mafeje said he found the offer "most demeaning". (Note: Mafeje wrote, "I fail to see how after 18 years of being a professor internationally I could be offered a research fellowship at the rank of senior lecturer at the University of Cape Town. This becomes even more incomprehensible when one recalls that one had been offered an appointment at the same rank by the same university as far back as 1968 ... After 27 years in exile I do not intend to return to South Africa under any conditions. Some of the senior staff at the University of Cape Town should have understood this.") In 1994, Mafeje applied for the A.C. Jordan Chair in African Studies at UCT, but his application was rejected as he was deemed "unsuitable for the position". Mahmood Mamdani, an Indian-born Ugandan professor, was appointed instead. He left after having disagreements with the administration on his draft syllabus of a foundation course on Africa called Problematizing Africa. This was dubbed the Mamdani Affair.

In 2002, UCT Vice-Chancellor Njabulo Ndebele re-opened the matter of the so-called Mafeje affair. In 2003, UCT officially apologised to Mafeje and offered him an honorary doctorate, but he did not respond to UCT's offer. In 2008, after Mafeje's death, on the incident's 40th anniversary, UCT formally apologised to Mafeje's family. Mafeje's family accepted the apology.

=== Academic career ===
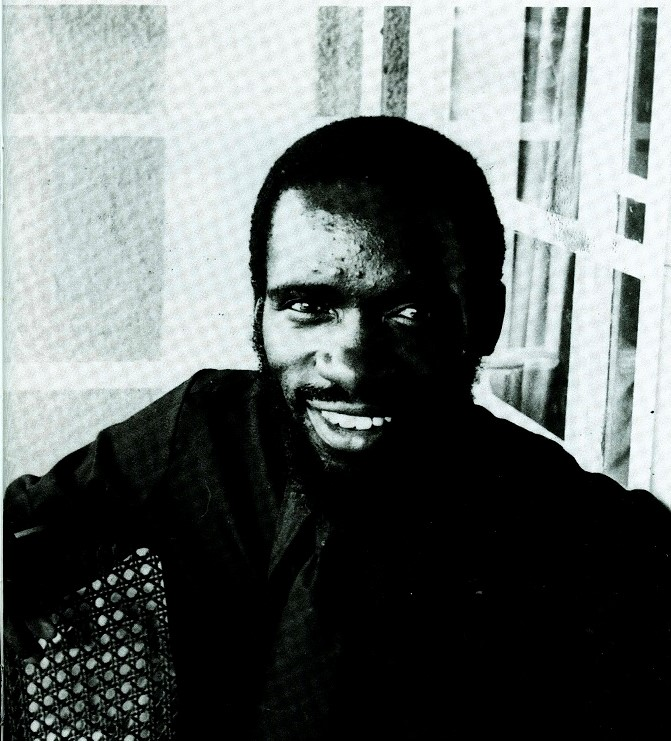
Archie Mafeje c. 1972

Mafeje assumed a senior lecturer position in 1969, before becoming a full professor and the head of the sociology department, at the University of Dar Es Salaam in Tanzania. However, he was seriously injured in a vehicle accident in 1971, after which he had to leave for Europe for reconstructive surgery. He did not return following a spat with the principal of the university and the dean of the faculty. Between 1972 and 1975, Mafeje chaired the Urban Development and Labour Studies Program at the International Institute of Social Studies in the Netherlands where he first met Shahida El-Baz (Arabic: شهيدة الباز), an academic and activist from Egypt who would later become his wife. In 1973, at age 36, Mafeje was appointed Queen Juliana Professor of Development Sociology and Anthropology by a Parliamentary act. He became a Dutch citizen and was appointed one of the Queen's lords with his name engraved on the prestigious blue pages of the Dutch National Directorate, becoming one of the first Africans to receive this honour.

With Mafeje's assistance, the Council for the Development of Social Science Research in Africa (CODESRIA) was founded in 1973. (Note: Akinwumi Adesina does not acknowledge Mafeje's involvement in the creation of CODESRIA.) He was appointed Professor of Sociology and Anthropology at American University in Cairo (AUC) in 1978 until 1990, and later in 1994. He was known for not giving his students tests, as he preferred essays on which he could make significant comments. According to his daughter Dana, Mafeje thought that "exams are for stupid people".

Mafeje joined the Southern Africa Political Economy Series (SAPES) Trust in Harare, Zimbabwe, in 1991 on a visiting fellowship. However, Mafeje left in the same year due to a disagreement with the trust's executive director, Ibbo Mandaza, who wanted Mafeje to keep 09:00 to 17:00 office hours. In 1992, Mafeje began a one-year visiting fellowship at Northwestern University in Evanston, Illinois, in the US. After working at Northwestern, Mafeje was chosen to lead the University of Namibia's Multidisciplinary Research Center in 1993. Mafeje's wife said his life was made a living hell by racist Namibians within and outside the university to the extent that he required a bodyguard. The experience severely impacted Mafeje, and departed Namibia and returned to AUC in Cairo in 1994.

Mafeje served as a senior fellow and guest lecturer at several North American, European, and African colleges and research centres. Throughout his career, Mafeje was a consultant to the Food and Agriculture Organization (FAO). In 2000, Mafeje returned to South Africa after spending more than 30 years in exile to take the position of a Senior Research Fellow at the African Renaissance Centre at the National Research Foundation. He also joined CODESRIA's Scientific Committee in 2001.

=== Personal life and death ===
Mafeje married Nomfundo Noruwana, a nurse, in 1961, and the two of them had a son, Xolani, in 1962. They divorced within a few years. Mafeje married Shahida El-Baz in 1977; they had a daughter, Dana. Mafeje had to convert to Islam before they were wed because El-Baz was Muslim. In his later years, Mafeje would describe himself as "South African by birth, Dutch by citizenship, Egyptian by domicile, and African by love". Mafeje was a keen observer of Egyptian socio-political and economic changes; although he disliked Anwar Sadat for persecuting intellectuals, he was never personally involved in Egyptian politics. El-Baz remembered that Mafeje was reading in his study on 6 October 1981, when Sadat was assassinated; while watching television news, El-Baz shouted, "Archie, Sadat has been shot!" After Mafeje asked "Is he dead?" and heard a reply in the affirmative, he opened a bottle of champagne to make a toast.

Mafeje was perceived by his peers as an independent thinker who was also extraordinarily "difficult", and by his students as someone who did "not suffer fools gladly". During one of his lectures, Thandika Mkandawire asked Mafeje to clarify or otherwise comment on condemning the unions that participated in the strikes in Durban in 1973. Instead of responding to Mkandawire's question, Mafeje said, "I am aware that you are from Malawi. You have no business asking me a question about South Africa while Malawi supports apartheid." Three days after the lecture, Mkandawire got a call from Mafeje, who strongly apologised and said he had made a major mistake. Mkandawire accepted the apology and extended a dinner invitation to Mafeje at his residence in Stockholm.

Mafeje was famous for saying, "If in the face of apparent defeat, we cannot maximise our gains, then it is imperative that we minimise our losses".

Mafeje died in Pretoria on 28 March 2007, and was buried next to his parents in Ncambele.

== Activism, research and ideology ==
=== Anti-apartheid and Marxism ===
Mafeje was part of SOYA and the African Peoples' Democratic Union of Southern Africa (APDUSA) which later became the Non-European Unity Movement. APDUSA and the Non-European Unity Movement argued for non-collaboration with oppressors. They campaigned for complete democratic rights for all oppressed peoples based on its Ten-Point Plan, which positioned the land issue squarely at the heart of South Africa's liberation movement. According to Mafeje, APDUSA is better understood as Leninist than Trotskyist as it emphasised the revolutionary potential of an alliance between workers and the "landless peasant".

The "landless peasantry" issue remained essential to Mafeje's work, although he later became critical of the Unity Movement. He was particularly interested in land ownership and resource allocation issues, and argued that the apartheid system was built on a foundation of unjust land distribution and exploitation. Mafeje advocated for a more holistic approach to land and agrarian reform that recognised rural communities' diverse needs and interests. He argued that land reform should not be imposed from above but should instead be based on a participatory and democratic process that involved local communities. Mafeje also emphasised the need for agrarian reform to be linked to broader social and economic transformation, including women's empowerment and promotion of sustainable agricultural practices.

Mafeje was critical of neoclassical economic theories that, according to him, underpinned many of Africa's land and agricultural policies, which he argued were often based on flawed assumptions and failed to account for the complexities of African societies. One of these was the liberal notion of poverty alleviation, which he critiqued as being based on a narrow understanding of poverty that focused solely on income rather than broader structural factors that created poverty in the first place. He argued that poverty was not simply a matter of individuals lacking sufficient income, but a result of unequal distribution of wealth and power embedded in colonial and postcolonial social structures. Therefore, Mafeje believed that a real solution to poverty alleviation entailed a fundamentally restructuring, rather than providing charity or aid to the poor. He argued that only through a comprehensive program of land reform, agrarian reform, and economic redistribution could the underlying causes of poverty be addressed.

Mafeje held Lenin and Mao in great esteem, but not Trotsky, whom Mafeje accused of being a Eurocentrist. However, according to Bongani Nyoka, Trotsky's "Letter to South African Revolutionaries" refutes this notion. Mafeje believed that socialism in one country is insufficient to bring about genuine social transformation and needs to be pursued at regional and continental levels. He argued that socialism could not be achieved in isolation but must be part of a broader movement towards social justice and equality across Africa. In his view, the struggle for socialism must involve solidarity and cooperation between African countries, and the goal should be to create a united, self-reliant, and socially just Africa.

Mafeje was an anti-apartheid activist in exile. His ideology was rooted in a Marxist and anti-colonial perspective. He believed that Africa's underdevelopment was a direct result of its history of colonialism, which had created a dependent and unequal relationship between Africa and colonial powers in the West. Mafeje advocated for an alternative approach to development rooted in self-reliance and African unity. He argued that African countries needed to prioritise their own development needs and resources rather than rely on foreign aid and external development models. Mafeje also believed that African countries needed to work together to achieve economic and political independence rather than compete with one another for Western aid and investment.

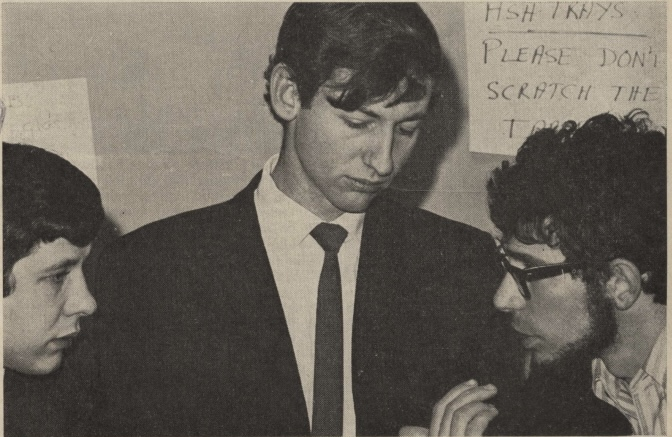
The leaders of the Mafeje affair sit-in in consultation. From left to right: Philip van der Merwe, Duncan Innes and Raphie Kaplinsky.

In exile, Mafeje shared animosity with white South African Communist Party (SACP) members, including Joe Slovo, Dan O'Meara and Duncan Innes. Mafeje accused them of "white superiority" and "ideological superiority", although Duncan Innes was integral to the Mafeje affair protest in 1968.

=== Decolonisation of African identity ===
Considered an important Pan-African intellectual, Mafeje studied and wrote about African history and anthropology. Mafeje published highly influential sociological essays and books in the fields of development and agrarian studies, economic models, politics, and the politics of social scientific knowledge production in Africa. He is considered one of the leading contemporary African anthropologists; however, he is considered more of a critical theorist than a field researcher.

Mafeje scholarly work significantly contributed to the decolonisation of African identity and its historical past, criticising anthropology's typically Eurocentric techniques and beliefs. He demanded that imperialist and Western ideals be eliminated from Black African anthropology, which led to an examination of the discipline's founding principles and the methods by which academics approached the study of the attributed other. CODESRIA, which promoted Afrocentrism and eliminated the Western perspective from pan-African research.

Mafeje was critical of the mainstream development theories of his time, which he saw as perpetuating this unequal relationship. Mafeje was also critical of Africa's academic and intellectual establishment, which he saw as being too closely aligned with colonial power structures. He believed that African scholars and intellectuals needed to challenge dominant Western perspectives and develop their own theories and knowledge systems grounded in African life's realities.

==== Critique of ethnography ====
Mafeje had a critical view of ethnography, which he believed to be a product of colonialism and imperialism. He argued that ethnography, as a tool of Western social science, tended to create a distorted and exoticised image of African societies and was often used to justify colonial domination and exploitation. Mafeje's views on ethnography are not limited to theory, but include a practical methodology for conducting research. Mafeje believed that ethnographic studies should be approached with caution and scepticism, and that researchers should be aware of the power dynamics and historical context in which they operate. He argued for a more self-reflexive and critical approach to ethnography, one that acknowledges the researcher's limitations and biases and is attentive to the political and economic structures that shape social relations. Mafeje advocated for an alternative approach to ethnography that involved a greater emphasis on dialogue and collaboration between researcher and subject, as well as a more reflexive and critical approach to the role of the researcher in shaping the research process and outcomes.

Mafeje was one of the first academics to dedicate himself to deconstructing the ideology of tribalism. His work demonstrates a shift from his earlier liberal functionalist views towards a more radical and critical perspective on African societies and their history. Mafeje was critical of liberal functionalism, a theoretical framework that posits that societies work best when organised around the efficient performance of specialised tasks by individuals and institutions. He argued that this perspective was often used to justify preserving colonial power structures and economic systems that were exploitative and oppressive of African people. Mafeje was particularly critical of the idea that the key to development in Africa was the creation of strong, centralised states and the imposition of a Western-style legal and economic system. He argued that this approach failed to consider the diversity of African societies and the importance of indigenous forms of governance and economic organisation. Instead, he advocated for a more bottom-up approach to development that prioritised the needs and aspirations of local communities and recognised the importance of traditional knowledge and social institutions.

In his work "The Ideology of 'Tribalism'", he challenges the notion of tribalism as a political and social concept. He argues that the idea of tribalism is a colonial construct used to justify domination and exploitation, and perpetuate divisions and inequalities in postcolonial African societies. He explores the historical context in which the concept emerged and how it has been used to maintain power structures and suppress dissent. He argues that African societies are not based on rigid tribal affiliations but rather on fluid and flexible relationships between different groups. He also critiques the idea of cultural essentialism, which suggests that there is an essential and unchanging African culture. Mafeje argues that culture is not static, but constantly changing and adapting to new situations. Mafeje's work seeks to challenge and subvert the dominant narratives about African societies and their supposed tribalism. Instead, it presents a more nuanced and complex understanding of African societies and cultures.

=== Debate with other scholars ===
Mafeje engaged in a series of debates and polemics with scholars such as Ruth First, Harold Wolpe, Ali Mazrui, Achille Mbembe, and Sally Falk Moore, who was an anthropologist and chair at Harvard University.

==== Ruth First ====
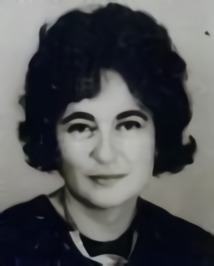
Ruth First c.1960

Mafeje and Ruth First disagreed on the Soweto uprising in 1976. Mafeje wrote an article critiquing the apartheid government's response to the uprising and broadly analysing the political and economic conditions that led to it. Mafeje argued that the uprising manifested broader social and economic tensions in South Africa, and that the apartheid government's response only exacerbated these tensions.

However, First, who was the editor of the journal where the article was published, responded in the same issue, to Mafeje's anger.

First's article, "After Soweto: A Response" was a critical response to Mafeje's "Soweto and its Aftermath". First argued that Mafeje's analysis was too limited and failed to fully address the complexities and nuances of the situation in South Africa at the time. She believed that Mafeje placed too much emphasis on the state's actions and neglected the black community's agency and resistance. First also criticised Mafeje's use of the term "African nationalism" and argued that it obscured the class and political dimensions of the struggle. Instead, she emphasised the importance of Marxist analysis and the need to understand the role of capitalist exploitation in the oppression of black South Africans.

Livingstone Mqotsi, a South African activist and scholar, responded to both Mafeje and First in an article titled "After Soweto: Another Response". In his article, Mqotsi criticises Mafeje's focus on the "spontaneous" nature of the Soweto uprising, arguing that it resulted from long-standing grievances and organised resistance. He also critiques Mafeje's analysis of the role of the black middle class and argues that the protesters did not constitute a homogeneous group, but rather included both progressive and reactionary elements. Mqotsi also critiques First's response, arguing that she underestimated the role of political organisations and overemphasised the role of individuals in the struggle against apartheid. Mqotsi argued for a more nuanced understanding of the complex social and political dynamics that led to the Soweto uprising and the broader struggle against apartheid in South Africa.

According to some accounts, Mafeje wrote a rebuttal to First's response which was never published.

==== Harold Wolpe ====
Harold Wolpe and Mafeje had a famous debate in the 1970s about the nature of the South African economy and the role of migrant labour in its development. Wolpe argued that the economy was based on exploiting black labour, which was separated from the land and confined to the homelands. Mafeje argued that Wolpe's view was based on a static and reductionist understanding of the rural economy and failed to consider the agency and creativity of rural people. According to Ntsebeza, the debate reflected broader discussions within South African social science at the time about the relationship between the rural and urban sectors and how colonialism and apartheid had transformed the social and economic landscape of the country.

==== Ali Mazrui ====
There was a notable debate between Mafeje and Ali Mazrui in the early 1990s, centred around the concept of "Africanity" and the role of African intellectuals in defining and shaping African culture and identity. Mazrui argued for a more expansive definition of Africanity encompassing the continent's diverse cultural traditions. At the same time, Mafeje took a more critical approach and questioned the idea of a singular African identity.

In his works, Mafeje emphasises the need for African intellectuals to be actively engaged in the struggle for social and political transformation, rather than being mere academic observers. He argues for the need to "indigenise" knowledge production by grounding it in African experiences and perspectives, rather than relying solely on Western theoretical frameworks. In this way, he seeks to empower African people to take control of their destinies and resist the dominant forces of imperialism and neocolonialism.

==== Achille Mbembe ====
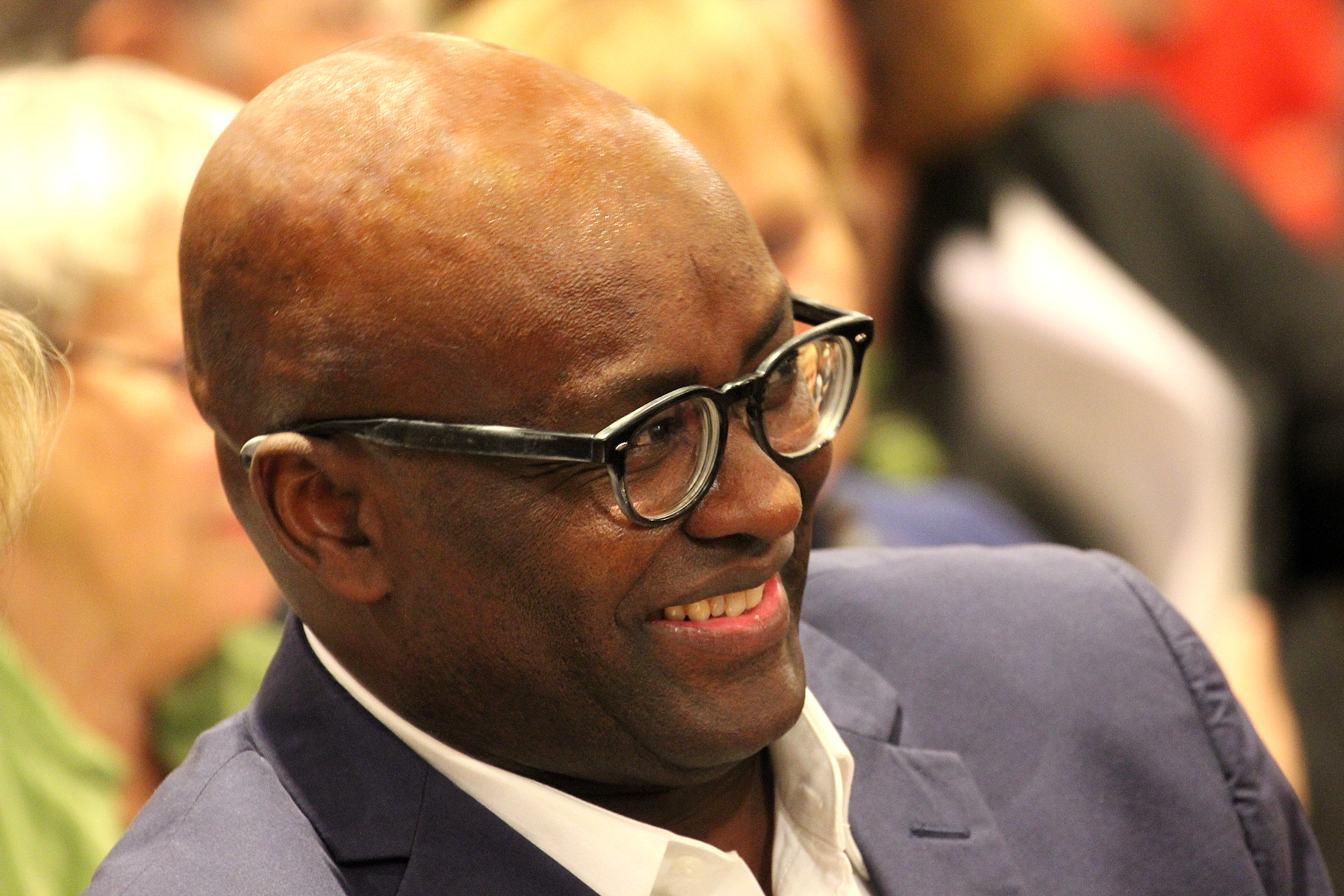
Mafeje and Achille Mbembe (pictured in 2015) disagreed about the concept of Afro-pessimism

Mafeje and Achille Mbembe disagreed about the concept of Afro-pessimism. In his book On the Postcolony, Mbembe criticised what he saw as a pervasive African belief in the inevitability of decline and failure, which he termed "Afro-pessimism". Mafeje, in turn, disagreed with Mbembe's characterisation of the concept, arguing that the pessimism he observed was not inherent in African culture, but a product of the historical and political context in which Africa had developed. Mafeje argued that African intellectuals should focus on analysing and critiquing these structural factors, rather than attributing Africa's problems to cultural or racial factors.

Additionally, Mafeje delivered a lecture in 2000 titled "African Modernities and Colonialism's Predicaments: Reflections on Achille Mbembe's 'On the Postcolony'", in which he criticised Mbembe's ideas about the nature of power in postcolonial African states and his use of the concept of the "postcolony".

==== Sally Falk Moore ====
One of the key areas of disagreement between Mafeje and Sally Falk Moore was the nature of social formation in pre-colonial southern Africa. Mafeje argued that societies were based on class relations and that social stratification existed in the pre-colonial era. He challenged the dominant view that African societies were essentially egalitarian and lacked social differentiation as in Europe.

On the other hand, Falk Moore argued that Mafeje had misunderstood the nature of social differentiation in African societies. She argued that the forms of social stratification in pre-colonial Africa were not comparable to the class structures of Europe. She emphasised that it was important to understand the specific ways in which power and authority were distributed in African societies.

Their debate was part of a larger academic discourse around the nature of African societies and the impact of colonialism on social and economic relations in the continent. While they disagreed on some key points, their work helped advance the understanding of the complex dynamics of African pre-colonial and colonial societies.

Mafeje was considered part of the first generation of indigenous researchers, who rejected colonialist and neo-colonialist interpretations of Africa. According to Mafeje, colonialist (or white) anthropology is inherently problematic since it is founded on the pursuit of otherness, which breeds racism and apartheid, as demonstrated by the history of South Africa. Colonial anthropology is therefore doomed to the extent that it embodies the separation of the subject (the white anthropologist) and the object (the Africans). This became known as the "epistemology of alterity in anthropology". However, Sally Falk Moore dismissed Mafeje's claims and accused him of launching unfounded personal attacks while "trying to kill a dead horse", i.e., colonial anthropology.

==== Others ====
In his paper "Conversations and Confrontations with my Reviewers", Mafeje engages with criticisms of various scholars, including himself. Mafeje's central argument is that his work does not intend to promote scientific knowledge as absolute truth, but to challenge the notion that it is neutral and objective. He maintains that knowledge production is always influenced by social, economic, and political factors, and that any claim to universal truth must be scrutinised in this context. Mafeje argues that he is advocating for a more nuanced and reflexive approach to knowledge production that considers the social and historical contexts in which it occurs.

Mafeje is perceived as one of Africa's most prominent intellectual and remembered for mixing his scholarship and experience as an oppressed black person. His work posthumously gained wide attention and has attracted growing interest from other African scholars, such as Francis B. Nyamnjoh, Dani Wadada Nabudere, Helmi Sharawy, Lungisile Ntsebeza and Bongani Nyoka.

== Awards and honours ==
While Mafeje's contributions to African scholarship and activism have been widely recognised, he received no major awards or honours for his work in his lifetime. Mafeje was elected a Fellow of the African Academy of Sciences in 1986. He received an Honorary Life Membership of CODESRIA in 2003 and was named CODESRIA Distinguished Fellow in 2005.

Posthumously, in 2008, the University of Cape Town (UCT) awarded Mafeje an honorary doctorate in Social Science, established a scholarship in his honour, and renamed the Council meeting room (that the protesters held throughout the Mafeje affair) the Mafeje Room, installing with a plaque honouring Mafeje that presides in front of the room. UCT also established the Archie Mafeje Chair in Critical and Decolonial Humanities. In 2010, he was awarded an honorary doctorate of Literature and Philosophy by Walter Sisulu University. In addition, the Archibald Mafeje PhD Scholarship was established in 2014 by the Tiso Foundation. The Africa Institute of South Africa (AISA) initiated the Archie Mafeje Annual Memorial Lecture series in 2016. The University of South Africa established the Archie Mafeje Institute for Applied Social Policy Research (AMRI) in 2017.

== Publications ==
- Mafeje, Archie (1971). "The Ideology of 'Tribalism'". The Journal of Modern African Studies. 9 (2). Cambridge University Press: 253–261. doi:10.1017/S0022278X00024927. ISSN 0022-278X. JSTOR 159443. S2CID 154652842.
- Mafeje, Archie (1976). "Agrarian Revolution and the Land Question in Buganda". In Arens, William (ed.). A Century of Change in Eastern Africa. De Gruyter Mouton. pp. 23–46. doi:10.1515/9783110800098.23. ISBN 978-90-279-7879-0.
- Mafeje, Archie (1977). "Neo-colonialism, state capitalism, or revolution?". In Gutkind, Peter Claus Wolfgang; Waterman, Peter (eds.). African Social Studies: A Radical Reader. New York: Monthly Review Press. pp. 412–422. ISBN 0-85345-381-0. OCLC 3103484.
- Mafeje, Archie (1978). Science, Ideology and Development: Three Essays on Development Theory. Uppsala: Scandinavian Institute of African studies. ISBN 91-7106-134-7. OCLC 4592269.
- Mafeje, Archie (1991). The Theory and Ethnography of African Social Formations: The Case of the Interlacustrine Kingdoms. London: Codesria. ISBN 1-870784-09-X. OCLC 25268543.
- Mafeje, Archie (1992). In Search of an Alternative: A Collection of Essays on Revolutionary Theory and Politics. Harare: SAPES Books. ISBN 0-7974-1087-2. OCLC 29526084.
- Mafeje, Archie (1992). African philosophical projections and prospects for the indigenisation of political and intellectual discourse. Harare: SAPES Books. ISBN 0-7974-1141-0. OCLC 30867290.
- Mafeje, Archie (1997). The national question in southern African settler societies. Harare: SAPES Books. ISBN 1-77905-059-3. OCLC 48418757.
- Mafeje, Archie (2008). The Disenfranchised: Perspectives on the History of Elections in South Africa. University of South Africa Press. ISBN 978-1868884414. OCLC 706020991.
