= Nathaniel Honono =

South African activist (1908–1986)

- Born: 21 October 1908; Qumbu, Transkei, Eastern Cape
- Died: 31 December 1986 (aged 78)
- Other name: Tshutsha
- Education: University of Fort Hare (BA, 1937)
- Organization(s): Cape African Teachers Association; Teachers' League of South Africa; Nqabara Senior Secondary School
- Political party: Non-European Unity Movement
- Movement: Internal resistance to apartheid

Nathaniel Impey Honono (21 October 1908 – 31 December 1986), also known as Tshutsha, was a South African activist. He was a graduate of the University of Fort Hare and became the president of the Cape African Teachers Association (CATA) in 1945, where he used his influence to oppose government education policies. Honono was a dedicated member of various organizations, including the Non-European Unity Movement (NEUM) and the All-African Convention. He worked closely with fellow activists like Isaac Bangani Tabata to advance the rights of marginalized communities and challenge apartheid policies. Honono's commitment extended to enduring repression, imprisonment without trial, and efforts to seek international recognition for the NEUM's anti-apartheid struggle.

== Biography ==
Nathaniel Impey Honono, also known as Tshutsha, was born on 21 October 1908, in the Qumbu district of the Transkei region, Eastern Cape. He earned a Bachelor of Arts degree from the University of Fort Hare in 1937.

In 1945, Honono became the president of Cape African Teachers Association (CATA) and utilised his popularity to resist the government's African education policies. He was an active member of various organizations, including the Transkei Organised Bodies, promoting unity across political and racial lines. He participated in the inaugural conference of the Non European Unity Movement in 1943 and was part of the All-African Convention, which opposed the Hertzog Bills that disenfranchised Africans in the Cape Province.

During the 1940s and 1950s, Honono worked closely with Isaac Bangani Tabata and other activists within the Non-European Unity Movement (NEUM). He was committed to advancing the cause of oppressed non-European communities and challenging the apartheid regime's policies. Honono's efforts were particularly notable in advocating for the rights and recognition of marginalized groups who were denied a voice in mainstream political discourse.

In 1950, Honono joined the Teachers' League of South Africa (TLSA) and remained an active member of CATA. He served as CATA's president for many years. His involvement in the NEUM reflected a commitment to a principled struggle against apartheid, characterized by advocating for a movement that would remain free from neo-colonial influences. Honono's contributions encompassed enduring repression, house arrest, imprisonment without trial, and other forms of persecution. These experiences were documented as part of the NEUM's efforts to assert its existence and dedication to the anti-apartheid cause.

For 13 years, he served as the headmaster of Nqabara Senior Secondary School, a Methodist missionary school in Willowvale. In 1951 and 1952, Archie Mafeje completed his Junior Certificate at Nqabara Secondary School. There, Honono introduced Mafeje and other pupils to the politics of the NEUM. The school was perceived as one of the best black secondary schools in South Africa; however, following the Bantu Education Act of 1953, the apartheid government later took over the school in 1956.

Alongside Alie Fataar, he organized a joint conference of CATA and TLSA in 1952 to reject segregated education and promote teacher unity. In 1955, he was dismissed from his teaching position due to his opposition to the subpar Bantu Education syllabus. He later established his own insurance company in Umtata.

Honono's role extended beyond organizational activities. He actively engaged in efforts to seek international recognition for the NEUM's struggle against apartheid. Alongside Tabata and Jane Gool, he travelled to Dar-es-Salaam to petition the African Liberation Committee (ALC) of the Organization of African Unity (OAU) for recognition. This recognition was crucial for the NEUM's legitimacy and for gaining material assistance for their political and armed resistance plans.

Honono died on 31 December 1986.

== See also ==
- Chris Hani – South African revolutionary and anti-apartheid activist (1942–1993)
- Livingstone Mqotsi – South African ant-apartheid activist (1921–2009)
