= Wolpe =

Wolpe is a locational surname of German origin, named after the medieval County of Wölpe. Notable people with the surname include:

- AnnMarie Wolpe (1930–2018), South African sociologist, wife of Harold
- Berthold Wolpe (1905–1989), German visual designer
- David Wolpe (born 1958), American rabbi
- Harold Wolpe (1926–1996), South African economist, husband of AnnMarie
- Howard Wolpe (1939–2011), American politician
- Irma Wolpe (1902–1984), Romanian-born composer
- Joseph Wolpe (1915–1997), South African psychiatrist
- Lenny Wolpe (born 1951), American actor
- Paul Root Wolpe (born 1957), American sociologist
- Sholeh Wolpé (born 1962), Iranian-born American poet, literary translator and playwright
- Shalom Dov Wolpo (born 1948), also Sholom Ber Wolpe (born 1948), Israeli rabbi
- Stefan Wolpe (1902–1972), American composer

== See also ==
- Volpe
- Wölpe, a river in Germany
- County of Wölpe, a territorial lordship in the Middle Ages
