= Deb Callahan =

American environmental and political leader

- Education: University of California, Santa Barbara (BA)
- Political party: Democratic
- Spouse: Ken Cook

Deb Callahan is an American environmental and political leader. In 2011, she became the executive director of the Point Reyes National Seashore Association in the San Francisco Bay area. Previously she served as president of The H. John Heinz III Center For Science, Economics And The Environment, a Washington, DC, nonprofit institution dedicated to improving the scientific and economic foundation for environmental policy.

Callahan is the immediate past president of the League of Conservation Voters, where she served as president for ten years. Prior to her work there, she served as the founding executive director for the Brainerd Foundation and was a program officer for the W. Alton Jones Foundation, both prominent environmental grant making foundations. She has worked in advocacy organizations and on Capitol Hill, including the National Clean Air Coalition, the National Toxics Campaign and in the US Senate.

Callahan has also managed and staffed numerous electoral campaigns including the presidential campaigns of Vice Presidents Al Gore and Walter Mondale, and campaigns for Senator Kent Conrad, Congressman Howard Wolpe and Congressman George Brown. She has served on numerous boards of directors, including America Votes, the Federation of State Conservation Voter Leagues, World Resources Institute and the Earth Day Network. A nationally known spokesperson and media commentator on environmental and progressive political issues, in 2004 Callahan became the first environmental organizational representative to address the Democratic National Convention.

She is married to Ken Cook, president of the Environmental Working Group. She graduated in 1981 from the University of California, Santa Barbara with a degree in Environmental Studies and Political Science.

== Prior positions ==
- Executive Director (1995–1996), Brainerd Foundation
- Program Officer (1992–1994), W. Alton Jones Foundation
- Policy Consultant (1991–1992), National Toxics Campaign
- Campaign Manager (1990–1991), Wolpe congressional campaign
- National Field Director (1987–1988), Gore presidential primary campaign
- Executive Assistant (1986–1987), Office of Senator Kent Conrad
- New England political director (1985–1986), League of Conservation Voters
- Deputy Campaign Manager (1986), Conrad senatorial campaign
- Field Coordinator (1984), Mondale-Ferraro presidential campaign
