= Stella Engama =

- Born: Stella Irène Virginie Engama; February 25, 1955 (age 71); Yaoundé, Centre Region, Cameroon
- Writing career
- Notable works: A Century of Agony; Invent Me; Intimate Words; The Chains of the Right of First Night; The Delights of Hell; The Feelings We Love

Stella Engama, born Stella Irène Virginie Engama on February 25, 1955 (age 71) in Yaoundé, Centre Region, Cameroon, is a Cameroonian teacher-researcher, novelist, poet, and playwright. She is the promoter of a literary prize named after her Foundation "the Stella Engama Universal Foundation for Education and Culture(FUSEE)". She is also a founder of schools, a cultural center, and the Society of Friends of Literature (SAL). She is a queen in the Eton people.

== Early life and education ==
Stella Engama was born on February 25, 1955, in Yaoundé, the fourth of sixteen children. In 1973, she passed the Baccalauréat G1 with honors at the Technical High School of Yaoundé. In 1978, she obtained a Master's in Private Law at the University of Yaoundé. In 1983, she earned a Diploma of Advanced Studies (DEA) in Business Law at Paris II.

== Career ==
Stella Engama held the position of Executive Secretary at the Chancellery of the University of Yaoundé. She taught law at the Technical Commercial High School of Yaoundé and at the Association for the Training of Executives (AFCA) where she was a part-time lecturer. In 1979, she joined the T. Bella Group as an Executive Assistant in charge of Litigation and Personnel. She resigned in 1982 to venture into entrepreneurship. She first created, with her architect brother, a civil engineering and interior architecture company called ARDEHCOUnive. Then, she launched the Stella Engama Universal Foundation for Education and Culture (FUSEE) in August 1989, which included schools in Yaoundé and her village in Nkol-Nyada, 25 kilometers on the road to Okola.

=== Literary career ===
In 1993, she published the first volume of A Century of Agony under the title Mystery of My Life, and in 1998, the second volume, The Broken Universe of a Queen was published. In 2003, she participated in the Paris Book Fair at Porte de Versailles where 40 copies of the novel The Chains of the Right of First Night were sold.

She is committed to promoting Francophone African literatures.

She published Invent Me and Intimate Words, a collection of poems dedicated to problematic love relationships, offering a questioning of social gender relations.

Stella Engama continues to write correspondences. She published funeral tributes to Eno Belinga, Emmanuel Keki Manyo, René Philombé, Cyrille Effala, and Sita Bella.

== Family ==
Stella Engama is married and divorced. She is the mother of seven children and has four grandchildren.

== Works ==
=== Novels ===
- A Century of Agony (in French). Editions FUSEE. 1992. OCLC 35049459., preface by Jacques Fame Ndongo.
- The Chains of the Right of First Night: Novel (in French). Editions F.S.E.E. 2002. OCLC 52922935..
- The Broken Universe of a Queen: Novel (in French). 1998. OCLC 1057377901..
- The Delights of Hell.

=== Poetry ===
- The Feelings We Love: Poetry (in French). Editions FUSEE. OCLC 57533327. The Feelings We Love.
- Invent Me and Intimate Words: Symphonic Poem in 19 Movements (in French). Editions FUSEE. 1999. OCLC 47224391..

== See also ==
- Djaïli Amadou Amal
- Fidine Nadalè
