= Jane Gool-Tabata =

South African activist

Jane Gool-Tabata (19 March 1902 – 6 May 1996) was a South African socialist activist and co-founder of groups such as the Non-European Unity Movement, of which she was president in the last years of her life. She was the life partner of Isaac Bangani Tabata and relative of other activists such as Cissie Gool.

== Early life ==
Jane Gool was born and grew up in Cape Town in a politically active family which briefly hosted the future Mahatma Gandhi during her childhood. Her older brother Abdul, the first "Black" doctor in South Africa, ensured that she had an appropriate education, including studies at the University of Fort Hare. She became a schoolteacher.

== Political career ==
Gool and her brother Goolam dabbled in the Communist Party of South Africa and related clubs before co-founding the Workers Party of South Africa and later, the Unity Movement. Unlike the main resistance groups of the time, this movement rejected race-based organising (since it rejected the concept of race). Gool's final political project was the African People's Democratic Union of South Africa (APDUSA) which became part of the exiled anti-apartheid movement Gool and Tabata were living in Zimbabwe at the time of his death (1990), after which she returned to Cape Town and became president of the Unity Movement from 1993 until her own death.
