= Livingstone Mqotsi =

South African ant-apartheid activist (1921–2009)

- Born: 18 April 1921; Rabula, Keiskammahoek
- Died: 25 September 2009 (aged 88)
- Other name: Livy
- Education: Fort Hare University
- Movement: Anti-apartheid movement Non-European Unity Movement; Decolonization of knowledge

Livingstone Mqotsi (18 April 1921 – 25 September 2009), also known as Livy, was a South African social anthropologist and activist. Born in a low-income family, his academic journey led him to Fort Hare University, where he studied social anthropology and became one of Monica Wilson's distinguished students. He engaged in activism and resistance against apartheid and was known for mobilising communities.

Mqotsi's teaching career was cut short due to his opposition to the apartheid government's Bantu Education Act. He struggled to find employment and eventually transitioned to being a newspaper editor, facing bans and persecution. In exile, he continued his activism, writing, and educational career in London. His research focused on witchcraft, healing practices, and African society, challenging Western stereotypes and promoting African perspectives in academic discourse. He engaged in academic disagreements with scholars like Archie Mafeje and Ruth First on the Soweto uprising, emphasising the complexity of the struggle against apartheid.

Mqotsi posthumously received an honorary decoration from Fort Hare University. In 2013, Musician Israel paid tribute to him in a single from the album "Critical Thought."

== Early life and education ==
Livingstone Mqotsi was born on 18 April 1921, in the village of Rabula in the Keiskammahoek district, which is now part of the Eastern Cape province in South Africa. He was born into a low-income family, and his father worked as a farmer. After completing primary school in Keiskammahoek, Livingstone Mqotsi attended Paterson High School in Port Elizabeth in 1943.

Mqotsi's academic journey began at Fort Hare University, where he pursued a bachelor of art degree in social anthropology, graduating in 1948. Monica Wilson, a renowned anthropologist, recognised Mqotsi's potential and mentored him throughout his studies. Mqotsi's engagement with Wilson's teachings and his exposure to anthropological research significantly influenced his future research interests and his commitment to understanding African societies and cultures. He is described as one of Monica Wilson's most talented social anthropology students at Fort Hare in the 1940s. He published a study in African Studies during his time as a student, which served as a stepping stone into the professional academy.

== Career and activism ==
Livingstone Mqotsi's early life experiences and upbringing likely played a role in shaping his perspectives and future endeavours. His humble origins as part of a peasant family in a rural area may have influenced his later engagement in activism and pursuit of higher education in social anthropology. During his time at Fort Hare, Mqotsi also became involved in activism and political movements. He actively participated in groups affiliated with the Non-European Unity Movement (NEUM). Mqotsi's activism extended beyond the university campus. He was known for his efforts to mobilise communities and promote resistance against the apartheid regime.

Mqotsi's teaching career, which began at Newell High School in 1950 and continued at Healdtown Training College from 1952 to 1954, was abruptly cut short due to his conflict with the apartheid government over their Bantu Education Act of 1953. Furthermore, Mqotsi's work as a mentor and educator had a profound influence on future generations of scholars and activists. Archie Mafeje was deeply influenced by Mqotsi, his teacher at Healdtown Comprehensive School in Fort Beaufort, and started participating actively in groups connected to the Non-European Unity Movement.

His involvement with the Cape African Teachers' Association (CATA) in campaigning against the Bantu Education Act resulted in him and 200 other CATA members being banned from teaching. Facing a state-driven campaign of persecution, Mqotsi struggled to find employment. He briefly worked as a Senior Education Fellow at the University of Fort Hare, but the Native Affairs Department objected. Subsequent attempts at employment were thwarted due to his political beliefs. Mqotsi pursued a master's degree in industrial psychology, but his proposals for improving labour relations in the mining industry were not well-received, leading to his dismissal. He then attempted to find work as an unskilled labourer.

His involvement with the Non-European Unity Movement led to a new career as a newspaper editor, publishing "Indaba Zasemonti" (East London News), which criticised apartheid. The government closed the newspaper in 1960 and banned Mqotsi for five years under the Suppression of Communism Act. In 1961, the NEUM's newspaper was also closed. To avoid banishment, Mqotsi transitioned to a legal career, working alongside Louis Mtshizana. They established a law practice known for handling "political" cases but faced charges from the apartheid state. Eventually, they received five-year banning orders. Mqotsi was imprisoned for two months without trial during the 1960 state of emergency. Due to continuous persecution, the Unity Movement instructed him to leave the country.

Mqotsi's fled to Botswana and later Zambia from 1964 to 1970, ultimately finding a new home in England from 1970 to 2001 with his family unable to join him. During his years in exile, he pursued a career as an educator in London, initially at West Greenwich Boys High School from 1970 to 1977 and later as the headmaster at Catford Boys High School from 1978 to 1986, where he eventually retired.

Despite his exile, Mqotsi continued to be a prolific writer. He co-edited the Unity Newsletter from 1966 to 1969, a monthly publication associated with the NEUM in exile. Remaining dedicated to the principles of the NEUM, he joined the New Unity Movement (NUM) in 1985 while still living in exile in London.

After returning from exile in 2001, Mqotsi settled in East London and played a pivotal role in establishing the Border branch of the NUM in 2007.

== Writing ==
Mqotsi authored numerous papers on the South African liberation struggle and engaged in extensive letter-writing with the press and fellow activists. One of his notable accomplishments during this period was transforming a play he had written in the late 1950s into a novel titled The House of Bondage, which was published in 1989. He also composed an unpublished account detailing the various liberation movements involved in the South African struggle, titled South African Liberation at the Crossroads. After returning from exile in 2001, continued his writing endeavours, publishing a second novel, a sequel to his first, titled 'The Mind in Chains' in 2008. Additionally, he released a third book, 'A Study of Ukuthwasa,' in the same year, which was based on his MA degree thesis.

As Mqotsi progressed in his academic career, his research focused on the intersection of witchcraft, healing practices, and African society. For example, he studied that explored the role of witchcraft and traditional healing in the Middledrift community during the period from 1945 to 1957 including a study about Ukuthwasa, a Culture-bound syndrome associated with the calling and the initiation process to become a sangoma, a type of traditional healer.

Mqotsi's research on witchcraft and healing practices contributed to a deeper understanding of African societies, challenging the prevailing Western-centric stereotypes and misconceptions surrounding these topics. His work emphasised the significance of cultural context and the importance of understanding and respecting African traditions and knowledge systems. Mqotsi's research, combined with his activist background, positioned him as a leading voice in the decolonisation of knowledge, promoting the inclusion of African perspectives in academic discourse.

=== Academic disagreement with Archie Mafeje and Ruth First ===
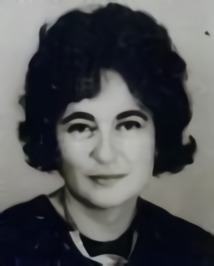
Ruth First c.1960

Mafeje and Ruth First disagreed on the Soweto uprising in 1976. Mafeje wrote an article critiquing the apartheid government's response to the uprising and broadly analysing the political and economic conditions that led to it. Mafeje argued that the uprising manifested broader social and economic tensions in South Africa, and that the apartheid government's response only exacerbated these tensions.

However, First, who was the editor of the journal where the article was published, responded in the same issue, to Mafeje's anger.

First's article, "After Soweto: A Response" was a critical response to Mafeje's "Soweto and its Aftermath". First argued that Mafeje's analysis was too limited and failed to fully address the complexities and nuances of the situation in South Africa at the time. She believed that Mafeje placed too much emphasis on the state's actions and neglected the black community's agency and resistance. First also criticised Mafeje's use of the term "African nationalism" and argued that it obscured the class and political dimensions of the struggle. Instead, she emphasised the importance of Marxist analysis and the need to understand the role of capitalist exploitation in the oppression of black South Africans.

Livingstone Mqotsi, a South African activist and scholar, responded to both Mafeje and First in an article titled "After Soweto: Another Response". In his article, Mqotsi criticises Mafeje's focus on the "spontaneous" nature of the Soweto uprising, arguing that it resulted from long-standing grievances and organised resistance. He also critiques Mafeje's analysis of the role of the black middle class and argues that the protesters did not constitute a homogeneous group, but rather included both progressive and reactionary elements. Mqotsi also critiques First's response, arguing that she underestimated the role of political organisations and overemphasised the role of individuals in the struggle against apartheid. Mqotsi argued for a more nuanced understanding of the complex social and political dynamics that led to the Soweto uprising and the broader struggle against apartheid in South Africa.

According to some accounts, Mafeje wrote a rebuttal to First's response which was never published.

== Death ==
He died on 25 September 2009, at the age of 88. He was posthumously received an honorary decorate from the Fort Hare University.

In 2013, Musician Israel single, part of the album "Critical Thought," payid tribute to Mqotsi.

== See also ==
- Chris Hani – South African revolutionary and anti-apartheid activist (1942–1993)
- Nathaniel Honono – South African activist (1908–1986)
