= James Hallock =

James Hallock may refer to:

- James N. Hallock (born 1941), American physicist
- James L. Hallock (1823–1894), American carpenter, farmer, and politician
