= Neum (disambiguation) =

Neum is the only coastal town in Bosnia and Herzegovina.

Neum may also refer to:

- Neum (music), the basic element of Western and Eastern systems of musical notation prior to the invention of five-line staff notation
- Neum (Book of Mormon), a prophet in the Book of Mormon whose pre-Christian era writings were recorded upon the plates of brass

== See also ==
- NEUM
- Neom
