= Fidine Nadalè =

Cameroonian teacher

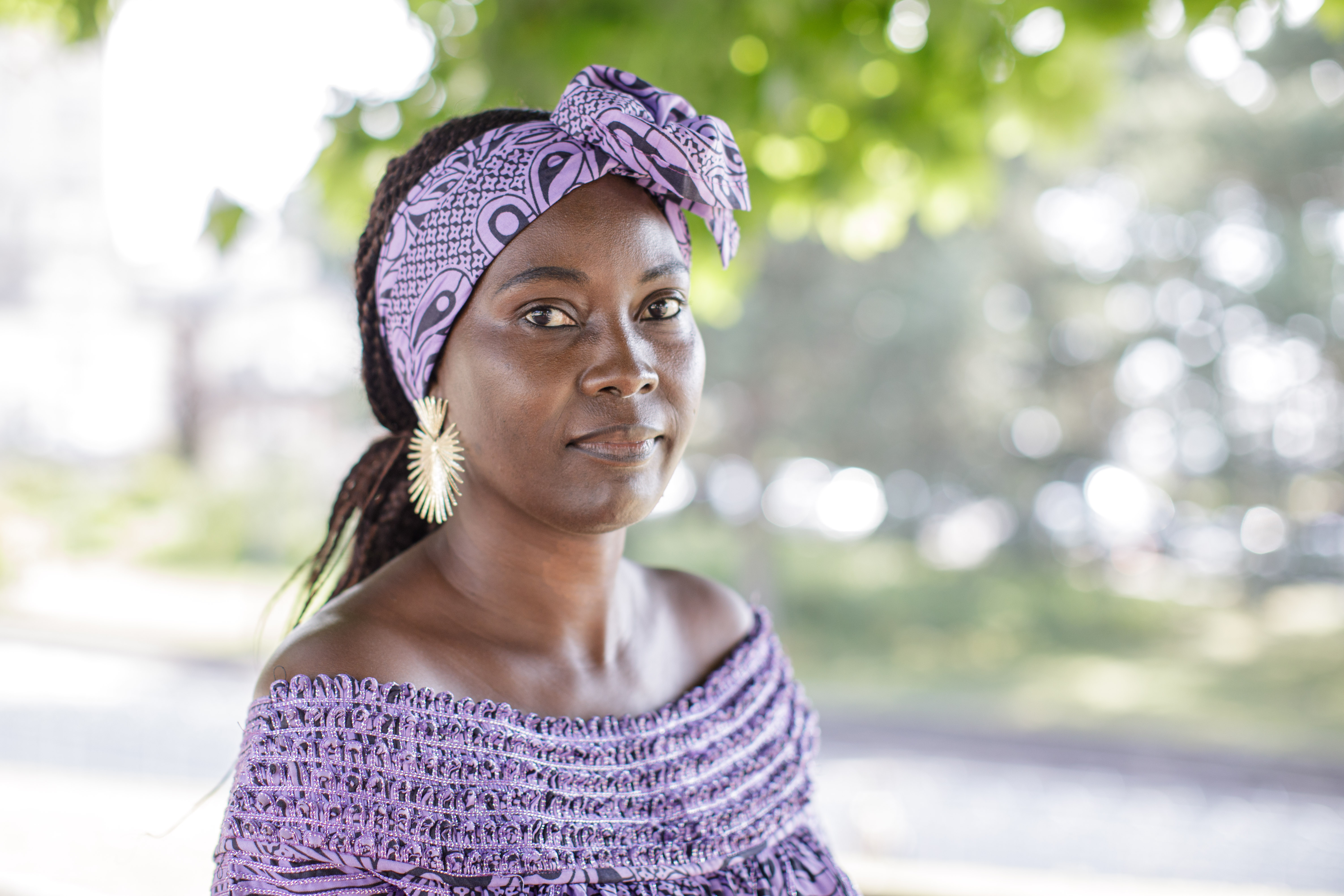
- Born: Hélène Finanou Dadjeodi; Doukoula, Far North Region, Cameroon
- Occupations: Teacher, playwright
- Writing career
- Language: French
- Notable works: Bouillon de thèses, Pensées-éclairs

Fidine Nadalè, born Hélène Finanou Dadjeodi in Doukoula in the Far North Region of Cameroon, is a Cameroonian teacher and playwright who writes in French. She is the first woman from the Septentrion region to work in theater.

== Biography ==
=== Early life and education ===
Fidine completed her primary education at public schools in Doukoula and Makary. She began her secondary education at CES in Makary and finished at a high school in Kaélé, where she obtained her Baccalauréat A4. She then pursued her studies at the University of Ngaoundéré, earning a master's degree in French Language and Literature (LEF) with a focus on the French language.

In 2005, she entered the École normale supérieure de Yaoundé and two years later obtained a Diploma of Secondary Education Teaching (DIPES II). She started her professional career in 2008 in Maroua at CES in Kakataré.

In 2012, she was appointed assistant principal at the Lycée de Maroua Domayo, where she taught French language disciplines. In 2020, she participated in a residency at the Association of Cultural Meeting Centers (ACCR).

=== Career ===
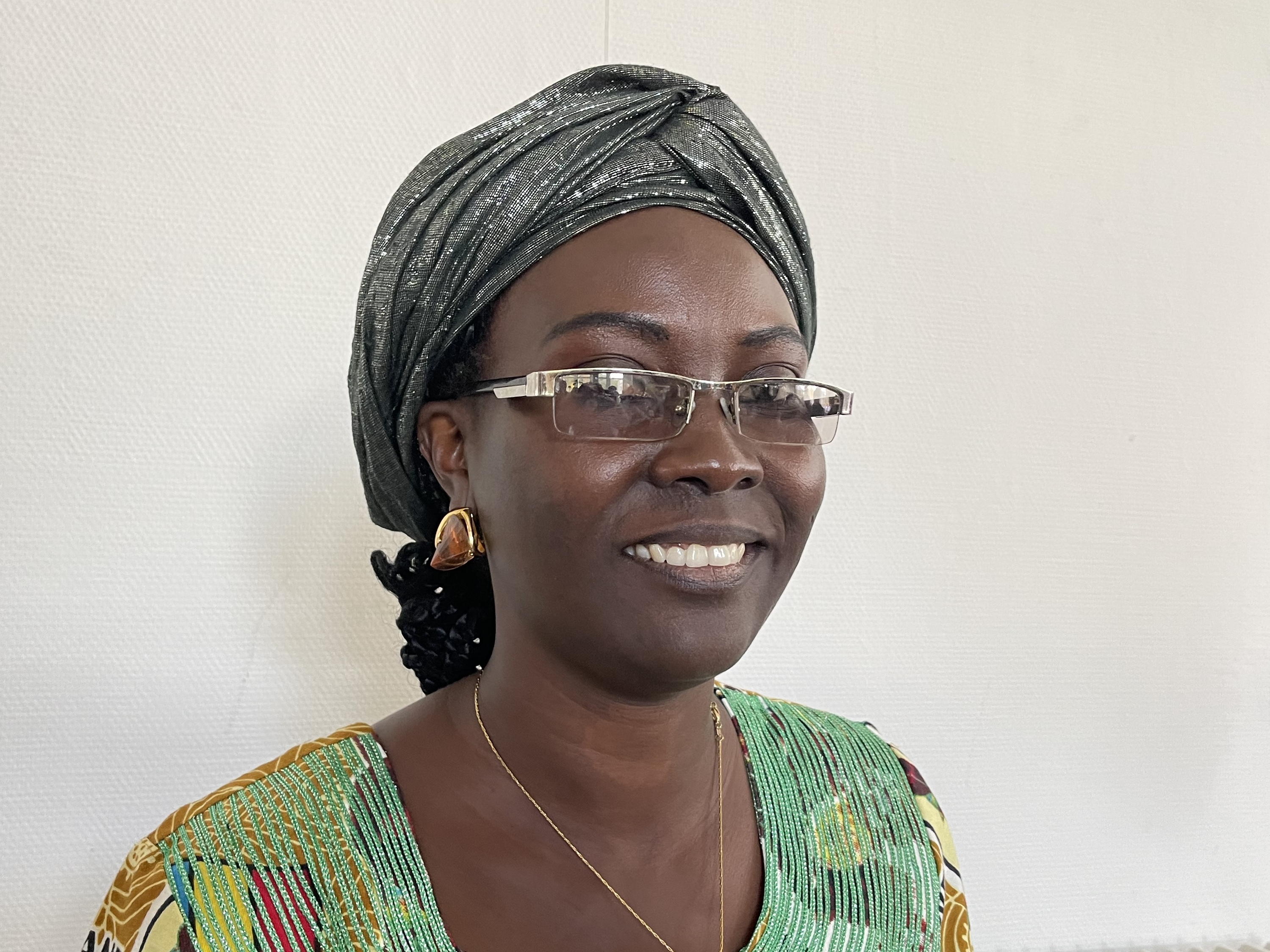
Nadalè Fidine in 2024 at the Zébrures du Printemps festival in Limoges.

Besides her teaching career, Fidine is passionate about literature. In 2008, she began writing and released a play titled Rien. This play was later improved and titled Bouillon de thèses, published in January 2018 by Auteurs Pluriels. That same year, she published a collection of poems titled Pensées-éclairs with the same publisher.

She hosts a literary café, Rad’art, at the Radel Library.

=== Personal life ===
Fidine is married and has several children.

== Works ==
- Nadalè, Fidine (2023). Revers. Éditions Lupeppo.
- Nadalè, Fidine (2022). L’odeur du temps.
- Nadalè, Fidine (2018). Bouillon de thèses. Yaoundé: Éditions Auteurs pluriels. ISBN 978-9956-589-12-8.
- Nadalè, Fidine (2018). Pensées-éclairs. Yaoundé: Éditions Auteurs pluriels. ISBN 978-9956-589-12-8.

== See also ==
- Djaïli Amadou Amal
- Shahida El-Baz
