= A Place at the Table =

- Film's Official Poster
- Directed by: Kristi Jacobson; Lori Silverbush
- Produced by: Julie Goldman; Ryan Harrington
- Starring: Jeff Bridges; Raj Patel; Tom Colicchio
- Edited by: Madeleine Gavin; Jean Tsien, A.C.E. Andrea B. Scott
- Music by: The Civil Wars; T Bone Burnett
- Production company: Participant Media
- Distributed by: Magnolia Pictures
- Release dates: January 22, 2012 (Sundance Film Festival); March 1, 2013
- Running time: 84 minutes
- Country: United States
- Language: English
- Box office: $231,378

A Place at the Table is a 2012 film produced by Lori Silverbush and Kristi Jacobson, with appearances by Jeff Bridges, Raj Patel, and chef Tom Colicchio. The film, concerning hunger in the United States, was released theatrically in the United States on March 1, 2013.

== Production background ==
Participant Media is the entertainment company behind the film, and it is distributed by Magnolia Pictures. The Participant/Magnolia team is also responsible for the film Food, Inc. (2008). The film was originally titled Finding North but the name was later changed to A Place at the Table.

== Synopsis ==
As of 2012, about 50 million Americans were food insecure. This was approximately 1 in 6 of the overall population, with the proportion of children facing food insecurity even higher at about 1 in 4. One in every two children receive federal food assistance. The film sees directors Kristi Jacobson and Lori Silverbush examine the issue of hunger in America, largely through the stories of three people suffering from food insecurity:

- Barbie, a single Philadelphia mother who grew up in poverty and is trying to provide a better life for her two children.
- Rosie, a Colorado fifth-grader who often has to depend on friends and neighbors to feed her and has trouble concentrating in school.
- Tremonica, a Mississippi second-grader whose asthma and health problems are exacerbated by the largely-empty calories her hard-working mother can afford.

Other Americans struggling with hunger are also featured, including a cop whose monthly paychecks only leaves him enough money to buy food for two weeks, forcing him to use a food bank. A Place at the Table shows how hunger poses serious economic, social, and cultural implications for the United States, and that the problem can be solved once and for all, if the American public decides – as they have in the past – that making healthy food available and affordable is in everyone's best interest.

== Book release ==
There is also a companion book titled A Place at the Table: The Crisis of 49 Million Hungry Americans and How to Solve It, edited by Peter Pringle and published by Public Affairs. The book features contributions from Jeff Bridges, Ken Cook, Marion Nestle, Bill Shore, Joel Berg, Robert Egger, Janet Poppendieck, David Beckmann, Mariana Chilton, Tom Colicchio, Jennifer Harris, Andy Fisher, Kelly Meyer and directors Kristi Jacobson and Lori Silverbush.

== Awards ==
The film was nominated for Grand Jury Prize at the 2012 Sundance Film Festival.

At the 2013 IDA Documentary Awards, the film received the Pare Lorentz Award, which recognizes films for model filmmaking while focusing on the use of the natural environment, and justice for all and the illumination of pressing social problems.

== Critical reception ==
The film has received positive reviews. As of October 2015, it has a 90% approval ratings from 61 professional reviews aggregated by Rotten Tomatoes. The following are a few examples of critical response to the film:

- "A Place at the Table forcefully makes the case that hunger has serious economic, social and cultural implications for the nation." - Julie Makinen, Los Angeles Times
- "The film explains with devastating simplicity why so many go hungry in a country with more than enough food to go round." - London Evening Standard
- "Beautifully shot and edited. The craft is of a very high level." - Toronto HotDocs Film Festival "Must See List"
- "A Place at the Table is an engaging and enraging movie that will enlist supporters for its cause." - Variety

== See also ==
- Animal, Vegetable, Miracle: A Year of Food Life
- Bananas!*
- Chew on This, an adaptation of Fast Food Nation for younger readers
- Eating Animals
- Fast Food Nation
- Food Matters
- Food, Inc.
- Forks Over Knives
- Fresh
- King Corn
- Million Calorie March: The Movie
- Our Daily Bread
- Super Size Me
- Taste the Waste
- The Future of Food
- The Jungle
- The Omnivore's Dilemma
- We Feed the World
