= Isaac Bangani Tabata =

South African political activist, author and orator

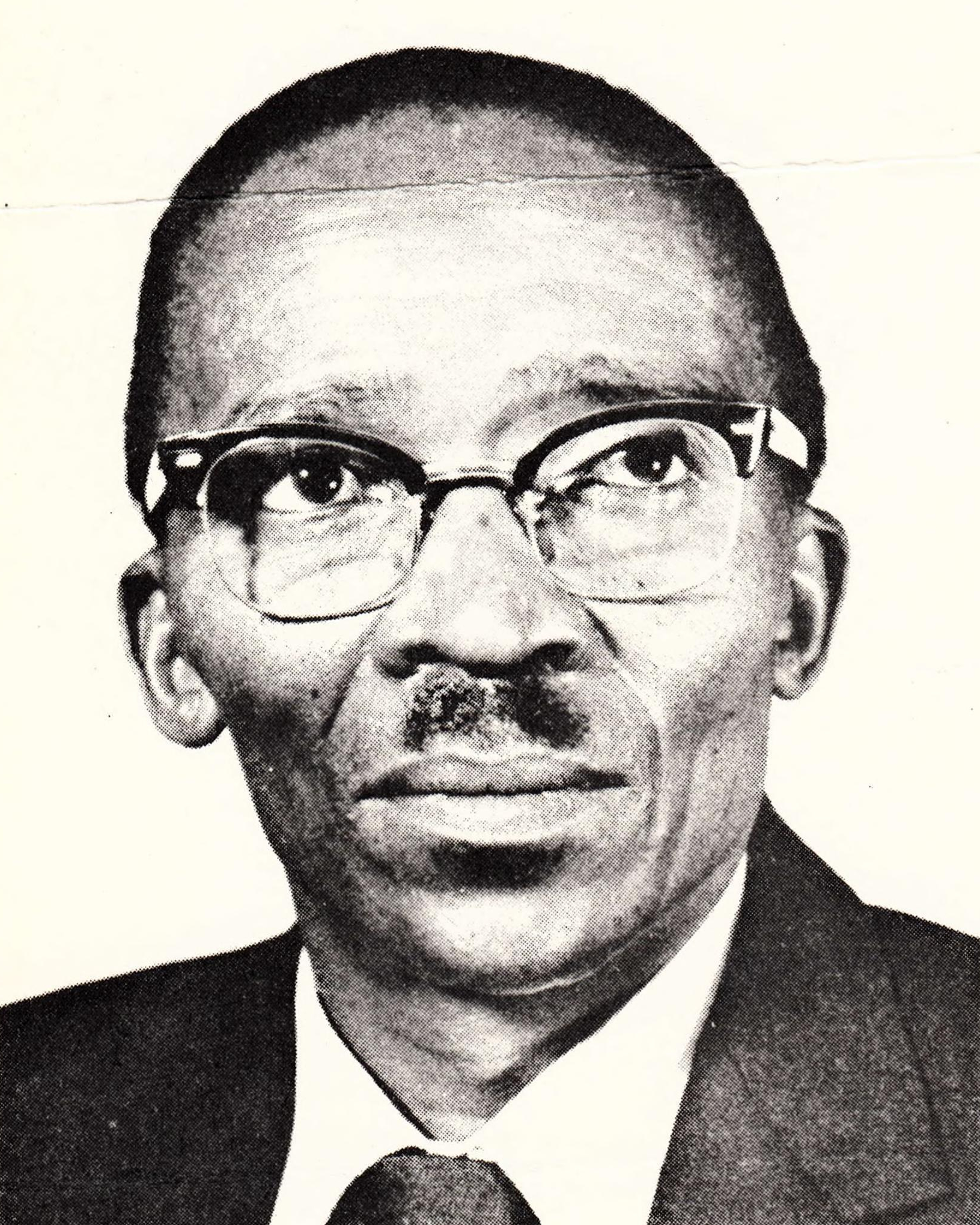
- Tabata c. 1960s
- Born: 10 June 1909; Bailey, Eastern Cape
- Died: 13 October 1990 (aged 81); Harare, Zimbabwe
- Other name: I.B or "Tabby"
- Education: University of Fort Hare
- Known for: anti-apartheid activist and writer
- Political party: Unity Movement of South Africa
- Spouse: Jane Gool

Isaac Bangani Tabata OLG (1909-1990), also known as "I.B" or "Tabby", was a South African political activist, author and orator. A Marxist in the Trotskyist tradition, he was central to the Non-European Unity Movement from its inception in 1943, as well as in the African Peoples' Democratic Union of Southern Africa (APDUSA) formed 1961. He is notable for his innovative analyses, theoretical work and lifelong commitment to the movement. Tabata was married to Jane Gool, a major political activist.

== Early years and the Workers Party of South Africa ==
Isaac Bangani Tabata was born on 10 June 1909 at Bailey, near Queenstown in the Eastern Cape. He attended his secondary schooling at the mission school of Lovedale, whose other notable alumni include Steve Biko, Ellen Kuzwayo, Govan Mbeki and Charles Nqakula.

He continued his studies in the University of Fort Hare, and then, from 1931, worked in Cape Town to seek employment. He found work as a truck driver and soon joined the racially diverse Lorry Drivers' Union, where he served as a member of the executive body. It was when he joined the Cape African Voters Association that he was exposed to Marxist and other radical literature.

He was a founding member of the Trotskyist Workers Party of South Africa (WPSA) in 1935, and joined the All African Convention (AAC) formed the same year, holding office in its executive body. Along with Jane Gool (later his wife) and her brother Dr Goolam Gool, Tabata played a significant role in the AAC's campaign against and analysis of the 1935 Land Act and moves towards the removal of the qualified franchise for Coloureds and Africans in the Cape Province. When the ANC withdrew from the AAC, Tabata worked building the AAC into a new national coalition. Tabata was also one of the founders of the Anti-Coloured Affairs Department Group (Anti-C.A.D).

== The Unity Movement ==
Tabata was a founder member of in the Non-European Unity Movement (NEUM) from its inception in 1943, which brought together the AAC and other bodies into a new national structure. The WPSA had gone underground in 1939, and focused much of its energies on the NEUM. From 1943, Tabata was a leading figure in both the NEUM and the AAC. Tabata's first book, the Awakening of a People in 1950, examined the political struggle in South Africa and argued the case for the NEUM. Tabata was critical of the African National Congress (ANC) and the South African Communist Party (SACP), which were the dominant political movements of the time, arguing for a peasant-based struggle. He also argued for complete non-collaboration with the apartheid regime and its allies. He also stressed the importance of a long-term strategy of political education.

Tabata often travelled between Cape Town and the rural Transkei, distributing and publishing the NEUM program, and helping build a significant NEUM network in Pondoland. He focused on attacking government 'rehablitation' programmes that aimed at limiting African farmers' livestock in the overcrowded African reserves. The Xhosa version of the NEUM text, The Rehabilitation Scheme: A New Fraud, was widely circulated and Tabata was involved in Transkei resistance to the rehabilitation schemes. Such activities led to his arrest in Mount Ayliff in 1948.

The arguments for peasant-based struggle and for boycotts were developed further by Tabata in a new pamphlet "Boycott as a Weapon of Struggle" in 1952, published at the same time as the ANC and the (now-underground) SACP started the Defiance Campaign of mass civil disobedience. During this time, he wrote Education for Barbarism, which criticised the Bantu Education system. In 1956, the state banned Tabata from public political activity, and confined him to Cape Town, for a period of five years, and the Suppression of Communism Act also led to the suppression of his writings. However, his work bore fruit, as the NEUM played a role in the 1950-1961 Pondoland revolt.

The Non-European Unity Movement split in 1957, and Tabata helped found the African Peoples' Democratic Union of Southern Africa group in 1961, as soon as his banning order ended, followed by the Unity Movement of South Africa (UMSA) in 1964. Tabata would remain a key leader of both UMSA and APDUSA for the rest of his life.

Tabata fled into exile in 1963, initially to Swaziland and then to Zambia. He also lived in Tanzania and Harare, Zimbabwe, where he died on 13 October 1990. In exile, Tabata did speaking tours of the United States of America in 1965 and 1970, addressed the Organisation of the African Union (OAU) and submitting various memoranda, and also addressed the United Nations Special Committee on Apartheid in 1971.

== Writings ==
Tabata wrote extensively for nearly fifty years: besides texts noted earlier, other notable and widely-read works by Tabata include Birth of a Nation , the Imperialist Conspiracy in Africa, Letter to Mandela, On The Agrarian Problem, Apartheid Cosmetics Exposed, The PAC Venture in Perspective". Most of these are now online.

== Legacy ==
Tabata played a major role in the formation of the Unity Movement tradition, which was until the 1970s the largest Trotskyist current in southern Africa. Both the African Peoples' Democratic Union of Southern Africa / Unity Movement of South Africa (UMSA) and New Unity Movement trends continue to hold Tabata in high esteem. For the former, he was 'a giant in intellect, an indefatigable and revolutionary politician, an outstanding orator and a skilled, analytical writer' who left a 'tremendous legacy'. For the latter, he was an extraordinary 'theoretician, writer, orator, organiser', and 'a Marxist of the highest calibre'

Thabo Mbeki, who then occupied the presidency of the Republic of South Africa, awarded Tabata the Order of Lethuli in gold for "exceptional contribution to the founding of organisations which forged unity among the oppressed across race and class boundaries".

== See also ==
- Non-European Unity Movement
- Queenstown Massacre
- Black Consciousness Movement
