= Ken Cook =

American environmentalist

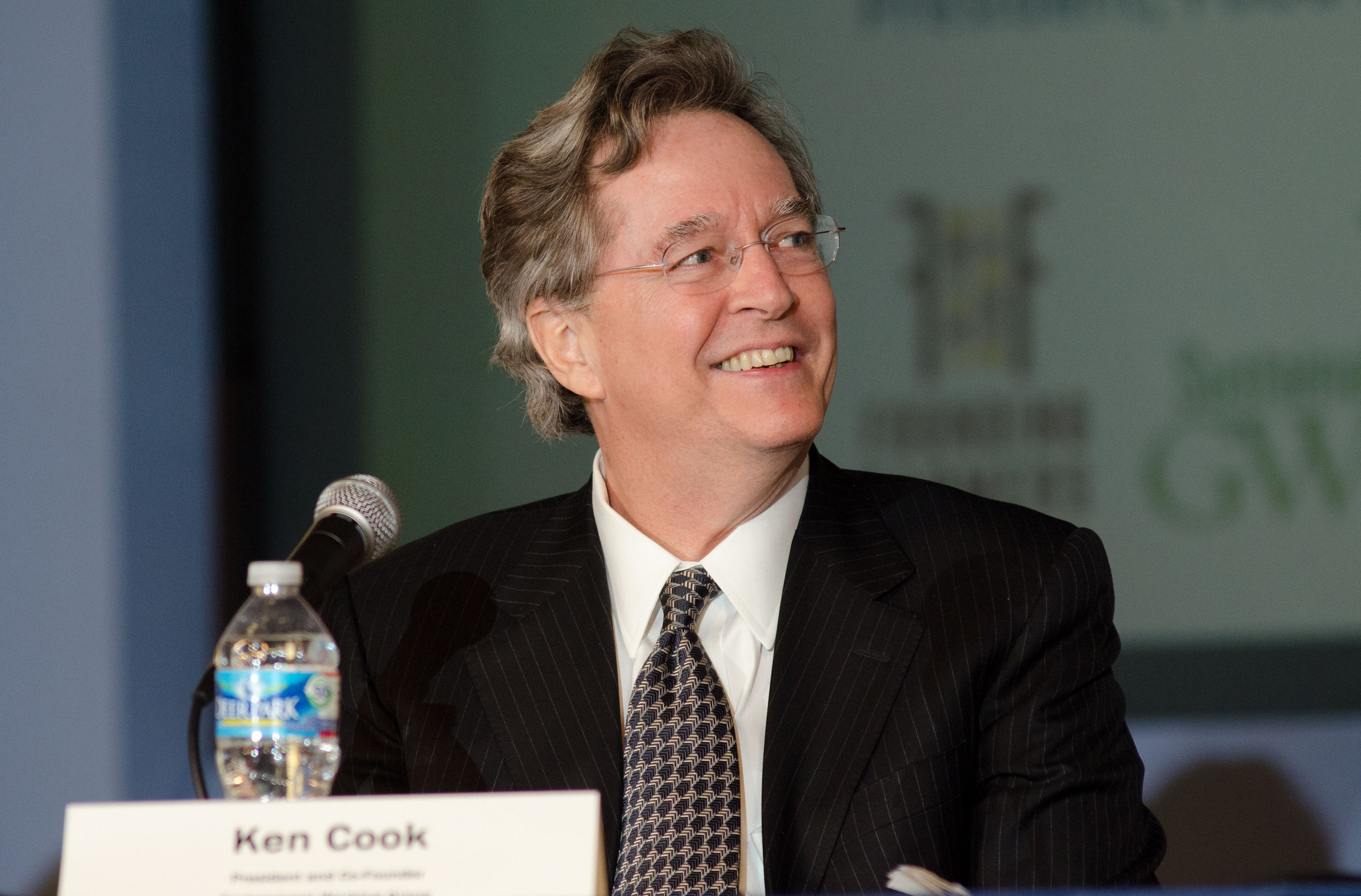
- Born: St. Louis, Missouri, U.S.
- Education: University of Missouri
- Occupations: Environmental advocate, policy analyst
- Known for: Co-founding the Environmental Working Group
- Spouse: Deb Callahan
- Children: 1
- Website: www.ewg.org

Ken Cook is an American environmental advocate and policy analyst. He is president and co-founder of the Environmental Working Group (EWG), a nonprofit 501(c)(3) organization focused on environmental and public health issues. Cook has contributed to U.S. agricultural and environmental policy, particularly in food and personal care product safety, pesticide and drinking water regulations, conservation programs for farming operations and clean energy initiatives.

== Early life and education ==
Cook was raised in suburban St. Louis, Missouri. He spent summers working on his uncles’ cattle farms, which influenced his interest in agriculture and the environment. In high school, he became fascinated by the debate between Paul R. Ehrlich and Barry Commoner about population growth and its effect on the environment, pursuing an independent study on their pivotal books – his first exploration of environmentalism.

He attended the University of Missouri, Columbia, earning a Bachelor of Arts in history, a Bachelor of Science in agriculture, and a Master of Science in soil science.

== Career ==
Cook began his career at an environmental think tank before working as an agricultural policy analyst at the Congressional Research Service of the Library of Congress. He served as a key lobbyist and analyst for environmental and conservation groups’ first major foray into agricultural policy during the 1985 Farm Bill debate. The resulting law made landmark improvements in policy, weaving conservation into subsidy programs, and resulted in tens of billions of dollars in federal investments to protect soil conservation, wildlife, and water quality. He later worked at the World Wildlife Fund under William K. Reilly, serving as a press director, policy analyst, and lobbyist. In 1990, he helped establish a policy program within the Center for Resource Economics, focusing on agricultural and conservation policy.

He has served on the boards of The Organic Center and the Amazon Conservation Team and has been involved with the Organic Voices Action Fund, advocating for GMO labeling laws. Cook is currently the chairman of the board for the nonprofit Center for Climate Integrity. He has supported stricter regulations on bisphenol A (BPA) and has highlighted concerns over toxic chemicals in consumer products.

In 1993, Cook co-founded the Environmental Working Group with Richard Wiles. The organization researches agricultural policy, conservation practices, and environmental issues. Its analysis of pesticide residues in food contributed to the passage of the 1996 Food Quality Protection Act. Under Cook's leadership, EWG has published research on drinking water contaminants, industrial pollution, and personal care product ingredients. It has also launched consumer resources such as "Skin Deep" and the "Shopper’s Guide to Pesticides in Produce".

He described the passage of the California Food Safety Act as a "milestone in food safety," emphasizing that California's economic influence could prompt nationwide changes in food manufacturing practices.

Cook advocated for increased transparency in farm subsidy allocations, arguing that the release of new U.S. Department of Agriculture data would help drive reforms in federal farm payments.

Cook has advocated for stricter regulations on per- and polyfluoroalkyl substances (PFAS) and enforceable limits on these chemicals in drinking water. He has opposed farm subsidies that primarily benefit large agricultural corporations and criticized federal subsidy distributions under the Trump administration. He has also spoken out against California's fixed electricity charges and efforts to reduce incentives for rooftop solar.

Cook has testified before U.S. congressional committees and advised policymakers, including Secretary of Agriculture Tom Vilsack and EPA Administrator Lisa Jackson. In 2010, he testified before a Senate subcommittee on the health and environmental risks of chemical dispersants used during the BP oil spill.

In 2011, Cook testified before the Senate Environment and Public Works Committee (EPW) about the presence of hexavalent chromium in U.S. drinking water.

He has spoken at events hosted by McGill University’s Division of Cancer Prevention, the Autism Research Institute, and the Food Tank Summit. His work has been featured in media outlets such as CBS Evening News, NBC Nightly News, The New York Times, The Washington Post, and Los Angeles Times. Cook has appeared as himself in documentaries such as King Corn (2007), The World According to Monsanto (2008), A Place at the Table (2012), Pricele$$ (2012) and The Devil We Know (2018), and Pretty Toxic (2021).

== Recognition ==
Cook has been named as one of Washington's Top Lobbyists by The Hill and The Huffington Post. In 2009, Cook was voted the “Ultimate Green Game Changer” by readers of The Huffington Post.

== Personal life ==
Cook is married to Deb Callahan, and they reside in Northern California with their son.
