= James N. Hallock =

American physicist (born 1941)

James Nelson Hallock (born January 23, 1941) is an American physicist. He has contributed to NASA's Gemini and Apollo missions and served on the Columbia Accident Investigation Board. He is a leading scientist in wake vortices, and co-authored two patents and over 150 papers.

Hallock was born in Yonkers, New York, and earned his bachelor's degree in 1963, master's degree in 1969, and Ph.D. in 1972 from Massachusetts Institute of Technology.

He has retired from the U.S. Department of Transportation as a senior scientist, Air and Space Transportation Safety at the Volpe National Transportation Systems Center in Cambridge, Massachusetts.

Hallock's career began as a graduate student, working for the MIT Instrumentation Lab (in the Apollo Optics Group) in 1963. During this time he gathered information on Earth landmarks to be used by guidance systems on the Apollo and Gemini space missions. He continued research with NASA's Electronic Research Center until 1970.

In 1970 he left the Research Center to work at the Department of Transportation's Volpe Center. Here he began his lifelong work on wake vortices. In 1986 he was promoted to Division Manager of the Aviation Safety Division, and held that post until 2006. At that time the Secretary of Transportation promoted him to senior scientist.

Most recently, in 2003, he was selected to sit on the Columbia Accident Investigation Board. Here his expertise was used in determining the final reports and causes of that fateful disaster.

Hallock was a longtime resident of Waltham, Massachusetts, residing there for 50 years, 1972 to 2022.
