= Million Calorie March: The Movie =

2007 documentary film

- Theatrical/DVD release poster
- Directed by: Jimmy Jay Friedan
- Written by: Sandy Jaffe, Gary Marino
- Produced by: Gary Marino, Todd G. Patkin, Jeff Schmidt
- Starring: Gary Marino, Russ Surette, Dan Jones, Brian Baldwin, Julie Marino
- Release date: September 7, 2007 (Boston Film Festival)

Million Calorie March: The Movie is a 2007 American documentary film directed by, co-produced by and starring Gary Michael Marino, an author, film maker, speaker, comedian and former health activist. The film follows Marino as he embarks on a 1,200-mile (1,900 km) fundraiser and awareness walk, the Million Calorie March, from Jacksonville, Florida to Boston, Massachusetts. The walk took 100 days and was designed to raise money and awareness for the causes of childhood obesity and adult healthy lifestyles.

== Synopsis ==
Million Calorie March: The Movie documents the Million Calorie March awareness and fundraising campaign and incorporates stories from Marino's 2005 book, "Big & Tall Chronicles: Misadventures Of A Lifelong Food Addict." Through flashbacks to his childhood, Marino documents the influences that led to his health struggles and his personal battle to overcome food addiction. The purpose behind Marino's film is the increasing awareness and acceptance of the diseaseobesity and food addiction throughout the United States and inspiring people to dig deep to fix themselves.

The 95 minute documentary premiered on September 21, 2007 at the Boston Film Festival to positive reviews. The film also screened at the Palm Beach, Jacksonville, Northampton and Long Island film festivals as well as health and wellness events throughout the United States. A shortened version of the film screened at over 40 tour stops during Marino's follow-up campaign, 2008's Million Step March. In November 2008, the documentary won an International Freddie Media Award in Philadelphia from the National Health and Medical Media Awards Associationand received a congratulations via video from singer Bono of U2 at the awards ceremony at the Ritz Carlton

=== Motivation ===
Formerly 397 lbs, Marino had lost over 110 pounds between 2001 and 2003 largely by dieting, exercise and researching the obesity epidemic. Through his research as well as his own struggles with weight loss and food addiction, Marino became passionate about achieving health and wellness at any weight and wanted to make a contribution to the cause. He formed the non-profit organization Generation Excel in 2004 and created the Million Calorie March, the awareness campaign and fundraiser that became the film of the same name. The Million Calorie March was designed to be interactive with other walkers, wellness groups and media representatives, who were invited to join the walk at any point along the route. Marino also raised money by asking for pledges at each stop in his journey up the eastern seaboard.

=== Journey ===
The Million Calorie March kicked off live on national television from Jacksonville, Florida. ABC’s Live with Regis and Kelly broadcast the kickoff in front of an estimated audience of 10 million people. The TV show covered the March again live on remote broadcast from the Washington Mall in D.C. on June 15, 2004, as well as the March crew’s arrival in Manhattan on June 24, 2004. Other media, including Fox News Channel, CBS radio, USA Today, People Magazine as well as local and state-wide media also covered the event.

== Book ==
Marino signed book deal with Barnes & Noble I-Universe Star division (one of the sponsors of the Million Calorie March) before embarking on the campaign. The book Big & Tall Chronicles: Misadventures of a Lifelong Food Addict was released during the final weeks of the March and distributed to audiences at events in New York, Connecticut and Massachusetts. Nine months later in April 2005 it was released nationwide in store.

== Results ==
The Million Calorie March reached over 70 million people through local, state-wide and national media coverage and raised approximately $150,000 for Generation Excel. Marino himself lost another 40 pounds on the march. The documentary Million Calorie March: The Movie received mostly positive reviews and was picked up for DVD distribution to colleges, libraries and schools thru-out the US and Canada. In 2009 the film was offered a 5 year broadcast deal from the TLC Network (The Learning Channel)

=== Events after the March ===
Marino launched a career as a motivational speaker in early 2005, donating all of his fees and book sales to the non-profit foundation, Generation Excel. Additionally he formed a running team to train for the 109th Boston Marathon with pledges also going to Generation Excel. “My goal is to simply complete this because the winner will be shaved, showered, have his check cashed and be on the plane back to Kenya by the time we hit the finish line,” Marino told Fox 25 Morning News the morning of the race. He completed the 42.195-kilometre (26.219 mi) race in 6 hours and 30 minutes.

=== Shrink & Shrunk ===
Marino also formed a business relationship with Psychologist and Wellness expert Dr. Howard Rankin. The pair recorded a radio pilot called The Shrink & The Shrunk and began making appearances together at seminars, conferences and health tours across the country.

=== Million Pound Meltdown (2005 & 2006) ===
One year after the Million Calorie March concluded, Blue Cross Blue Shield of North-eastern Pennsylvania asked Marino to serve as spokesman and producer for a two-year awareness campaign aimed at inspiring Pennsylvania's residents to lose weight and adopt a healthier lifestyle. The Million Pound Meltdown reunited most of the original road team from the Million Calorie March.

With obesity statistics running dangerously high in Pennsylvania, the “Meltdown” kicked off with a three-week tour of the area by Marino and his team including radio, print and TV stops. Walking through all 13 counties in Pennsylvania, Marino and his crew made three campaign stops per day speaking to audiences and leading walks around the anti-obesity theme.

Throughout the “Meltdown”, Marino also hosted his own weekly TV segment called “Gary Weighs In” which aired on WBRE-TV (NBC affiliate) and WYOU (CBS affiliate).

The “Meltdown” wrapped up at the end of 2006 with over 52,000 pounds lost by Pennsylvanians. The Meltdown participant's Primary care physicians confirmed the weight loss as part of the weight loss contest held in conjunction with the campaign.

=== Million Step March (2008) ===
The following year Blue Cross Blue Shield of North Carolina (BCBSNC) joined forces with Marino and Generation Excel to launch a healthy lifestyle and exercise campaign called the “Million Step March”. The “Million Step March” was designed to focus on encouraging walking and fitness as opposed to weight loss. Marino and BCBSNC Vice President Kathy Higgins kicked off the campaign April 1, 2008 in Asheville, North Carolina. Promoted as a “mountains to the coast” state-wide campaign, the “Million Step March” moved 12 –15 miles per day through eight media markets including Charlotte, Winston-Salem, Greensboro, Chapel Hill, Raleigh, Durham, Greenville, Fayetteville and ending in coastal Wilmington. Marino and Higgins appeared at nearly 60 live events during the 75-day walk. Over 800 people turned out for the ½ point “Rally In Raleigh” event and 600 showed up to cheer the walkers at the finish line event in Wilmington's Riverfront Park . Over all, more than 6400 walkers joined the Million Step March walking over half a billion steps.

=== Inspiring Wellness Campaign ===
In early 2009 Marino again joined forces with Dr. Howard Rankin to launch the “Inspiring Wellness Campaign”, in Hilton Head, South Carolina. This was a free community-wide effort offering eight weeks of free health and wellness seminars, film screenings and beach walks.

== See also ==
- Dieting
- National Weight Control Registry
