= Harold Wolpe =

South African political economist

Harold Wolpe (14 January 1926 – 19 January 1996) was a South African lawyer, sociologist, political economist and anti-apartheid activist. He was arrested and put in prison in 1963 but escaped and spent 30 years in exile in the United Kingdom. He was a senior lecturer in sociology at the University of Essex between 1972 and 1991 when he moved back to South Africa with his wife to direct the Education Policy Unit at the University of the Western Cape in Cape Town. White rule ended three years later. He died of a sudden heart attack in 1996.

== Life ==
Harold Wolpe was born in 1926 in Johannesburg to a Lithuanian-Jewish family. He graduated from the Witwatersrand University with a BA in social science and an LLB. He married AnnMarie Kantor in 1955 and they had three children - Peta, Tessa and Nicholas. He was a leading member of the struggle against apartheid and a friend of both Joe Slovo and Nelson Mandela. His legal work was centrally connected with the South African struggles until his arrest in 1963 - much of it concerned with political detainees. He was an important member of the illegal South African Communist Party (SACP) and was engaged with the ANC (which was banned after the Sharpeville Massacre in 1960). He was arrested and imprisoned in 1963 but escaped with Arthur Goldreich, Moosa Moolla, and Abdulhay Jassat in August 11, 1963 after they were arrested on Liliesleaf Farm in Rivonia with other uMkhonto we Sizwe (MK) high commanders in July 11, 1963 by South African Police and he lived in exile in England for 30 years. He was senior lecturer in sociology at the University of Essex between 1972 and 1991, and Chair of the Department between 1983-1986. He moved back to South Africa with his wife in 1991 to direct the Education Policy Unit at the University of the Western Cape in Cape Town. White rule ended three years later. He died of a sudden heart attack in 1996. His wife has written a biography of her life throughout the time of the struggles - The Long Way Home (1994).

== Work and politics ==
Wolpe is best known for the theory that cheap labour in South Africa was sustained by the articulation of capitalism with subsistence economies in rural areas. Workers could be paid at below social reproduction costs because the costs of social reproduction were being met in the parallel subsistence economy. Apartheid and other segregation regimes were kept in place to prevent the formation of a stable urban proletariat and ensure continued sub-reproduction labour costs, as those unable to work could be deported to the bantustans, and workers did not create stable families in the cities. This theory has been applied to explain low wages across the global South, including in Gayatri Spivak's theory of the expanded form of value. In a posthumous examination of his work, Dan O'Meara commented:

"It bears stating that Harold's Capitalism and Cheap Labour-Power article is probably the most influential and widely-cited theoretical text ever written on South Africa. Every sociology and politics student working on South Africa since, has been required to read this article, as have more than a few historians. Every critic of the South African neo-marxists has been obliged to begin their critique with this article. As the SACP noted in its statement on Harold's death, the article basically launched an entire new analytical paradigm on South Africa. But it did more than that. It alerted the newly emerging "school" of "revisionist" studies of South Africa to the absolute necessity of theory"

== Selected bibliography ==
- "The Problem of the Development of Revolutionary Consciousness". Telos. 4 (Fall 1969). New York: Telos Press.
- 1970. "Industrialism and Race in South Africa", in S. Zubaida (ed.), Race and Racialism. London: Tavistock.
- 1971. "Class, race and the occupational structure", in S. Marks (eds.), The Societies of Southern Africa in the 19th and 20th Centuries, Vol. 2. London: Institute of Commonwealth Studies, London University.
- 1972. "Capitalism and cheap labour-power in South Africa: From segregation to apartheid", Economy & Society, Vol. 1, no. 4.
- 1973. "Pluralism, Forced Labour and Internal Colonialism in South Africa". Paper to the Conference on the South African Economy and the Future of Apartheid. Centre of Southern African Studies, University of York, 30 March to 1 April.
- 1975a. "The Theory of Internal Colonialism: The South African Case", in I. Oxhaal et al., Beyond the Sociology of Development. London: Routledge & Kegan Paul, 1975.
- 1975b. "Draft Notes on: (a) Articulation of Modes of Production and the Value of Labour-Power; (b) Periodisation and the State", seminar paper, University of Sussex.
- 1976a. "The White Working Class in South Africa: Some theoretical problems", Economy & Society, Vol. 5, no. 2.
- 1976b. "The Changing Class Structure of South Africa: The African Petit-Bourgeoisie", mimeo.
- 1978. "A Comment on the Poverty of Neo-Marxism", Journal of Southern African Studies, Vol. 4., no. 2
- 1980a. "Introduction", H. Wolpe (ed.), The Articulation of Modes of Production. London: Routledge & Kegan Paul,
- 1980b. "Towards an Analysis of the South African State", International Journal of the Sociology of Law, vol. 8, no. 4.
- 1987. Class, Race and the Apartheid State. Paris: UNESCO.Capitalism and Cheap Labour-Power in South Africa: From Segregation to Apartheid
