= Volpe =

Volpe is an Italian surname, meaning "fox". Notable people with the surname include:

- Alessandro Volpe (born 1983), Italian footballer
- Anthony Volpe (born 2001), American baseball player
- Cristina Volpe, astrophysicist
- Francesco Volpe (born 1986), Italian footballer
- Giancarlo Volpe (born 1974), Italian-born American animator and director
- John A. Volpe (1906–1994), American businessman, diplomat and politician
  - John A. Volpe National Transportation Systems Center
- Joe Volpe (born 1947), Canadian politician
- Joseph Volpe (opera manager) (born 1940), American opera manager
- Justin Anthony Volpe (born 1971 or 1972), New York City police officer convicted and imprisoned for assaulting Abner Louima
- Clams Casino (musician) (born Michael Volpe, 1987), American musician
- Paul Volpe (mobster) (1927–1983), Canadian mobster
- Paul Volpe (poker player) (born 1981), American poker player
- Petra Volpe (born 1970), Swiss screenwriter and film director
- John Della Volpe, American pollster and writer
- Ralph Della-Volpe (1923–2017), American painter, teacher
