= Shahida El-Baz =

Egyptian activist (1938-2021)

- شهيدة الباز
- Born: Shahida Ahmed Khalil El-Baz; 2 November 1938
- Died: 21 October 2021 (aged 82)
- Spouse: Archie Mafeje (1977-2007)

Academic background
- Education: School of Oriental and African Studies (PhD)

Academic work
- Institutions: Arab and African Research Center; CODESRIA

Shahida El-Baz (Arabic: شهيدة الباز; (born 2 November 1938 - 21 October 2021) was an Egyptian feminist who wrote many books on Arab women's issues. El-Baz was the General Director of the Arab and African Research Center in Cairo, Egypt. She was a member of the General Assembly establishing the Arab Society for Sociology, and Council for the Development of Social Science Research in Africa (CODESRIA) as well as the Executive Committee between 2008 and 2011.

== Early life and education ==
El-Baz attended Helmeya Girls Secondary School and Cairo University. She had her Ph.D. from the Department of Economics and Politics, School of Oriental and African Studies, University of London, UK. She carried out her Ph.D. studies on the Development of Capitalism in the Gezira Scheme in Sudan.

== Career ==
El-Baz was an expert in Development, Civil Society, Gender Issues, Poverty, Children in Difficult Circumstances, and Globalization policies. El-Baz authored and researched various topics related to women's group formation in Egypt, democratisation processes, and the impact of economic sanctions and structural adjustment development programs on the socioeconomic status of Egyptians.

== Achievement ==
El-Baz was an International consultant, Political Economist, and expert in Development, Civil Society, Gender Issues, Poverty, Children in Difficult Circumstances, and Globalization policies.

She was the editor of the CODESRIA-AARC Journal Arab Selections.

== Personal life ==
El-Baz met Archie Mafeje while he was the Chair of the Urban Development and Labour Studies Program at the International Institute of Social Studies in the Netherlands between 1972 and 1975. Mafeje married Shahida El-Baz in 1977. They had a daughter, Dana. Mafeje had to convert to Islam before they were wedded because El-Baz was Muslim.

El-Baz remembered that Mafeje was reading in his study on 6 October 1981, when Sadat was assassinated; while watching television news, El-Baz shouted, "Archie, Sadat has been shot!" After Mafeje asked "Is he dead?" and heard a reply in the affirmative, he opened a bottle of champagne to make a toast.
