= Cristina Volpe =

Astrophysicist

Maria Cristina Volpe is an astrophysicist specializing in the theory and phenomenology of cosmological neutrinos, including neutrinos from supernovae, the mass of neutrinos, and neutrino oscillation. She has also been involved in research on ground-based facilities for neutrino production via beta decay, producing so-called "beta beams". She is a director of research for the French National Centre for Scientific Research.

== Education and career ==
After work at the University of Milan in Italy and Niels Bohr Institute in Denmark, Volpe became a doctoral student at the Grand Accélérateur National d'Ions Lourds and University of Caen Normandy in France, where she earned a Ph.D. in 1997 with the dissertation Etude des comportements anharmoniques et non-lineaires des vibrations des noyaux atomiques [Study of anharmonic and non-linear behaviours of vibrations of atomic nuclei], directed by Philippe Chomaz.

After research at the Institut de physique nucléaire d'Orsay (IPN), supported by a postdoctoral fellowship from the Italian Fondazione Angelo Della Riccia, she became a permanent researcher for the French National Centre for Scientific Research (CNRS) in 1998. She completed a habilitation in 2003 through Paris-Sud University, became a director of research for the CNRS in 2011, and was promoted to director of research 1st class in 2016. Initially affiliated with IPN, she moved to the Astroparticle and Cosmology Laboratory in 2012.

== Recognition ==
Volpe was named a Fellow of the American Physical Society (APS) in 2011, after a nomination from the APS Division of Nuclear Physics, "for her work on neutrino-nucleus interactions and understanding the role of neutrinos in astrophysical sites, and for her suggestion of building a source of low-energy beta beams using the beta decay of radioactive nuclei".
