= Healdtown Comprehensive School =

Methodist school near Fort Beaufort, South Africa

Coordinates: 32°43′55″S 26°42′18″E

Healdtown Comprehensive School is a Methodist school located near KwaMaqoma, Eastern Cape Province, South Africa, was established in 1855. It adopted its current name in 1994, having been known for most of its history as "Healdtown". The school was founded by John Ayliff, a Wesleyan Methodist missionary from England. It closed in 1865 and reopened in 1867 as a center for theological and teacher training. In 1880, the theological school relocated, leaving the Teacher Training School to continue at the original site. Girls were first admitted in 1898, and a high school course was introduced in 1925. The government assumed control of the school in 1956 following the Bantu Education Act of 1953, although the hostels remained under the management of the Methodist Church. By 1967, 761 students were utilizing the hostels.

Prominent former pupils include:

- Nelson Mandela (from 1937) and his youngest brother
- Robert Sobukwe (1924 - 1978) founded the Pan Africanist Congress (PAC)
- Raymond Mhlaba, ANC leader
- Archie Mafeje, South African anthropologist and activist.
