= Environmental Working Group =

American activist group

- Founded: 1993 (33 years ago)
- Founders: Ken Cook, Richard Wiles
- Type: 501(c)(3)
- Purpose: Environmentalism
- Location: Washington, D.C., United States
- Website: www.ewg.org

The Environmental Working Group (EWG) is an American activist group that specializes in research and advocacy in the areas of agricultural subsidies, toxic chemicals, drinking water pollutants, and corporate accountability. EWG is a 501(c)(3) nonprofit organization.

== History ==
In 1993, the Environmental Working Group was founded by Ken Cook and Richard Wiles. EWG is headquartered in Washington, D.C. Its lobbying organization, the EWG Action Fund (a 501(c)(4) organization) was founded in 2002.

EWG partners with companies to certify their products. Its reports are influential with the public, but it has been criticized for exaggerating the risks of chemicals.

== Activities ==
According to its co-founder Ken Cook, the EWG advocates for organic food and farming. EWG receives funding from organic food manufacturers, and that funding source and its product safety warnings of purported health hazards have drawn criticism, the warnings being labeled "alarmist", "scaremongering" and "misleading." Brian Dunning of Skeptoid describes the EWG's activities as "a political lobbying group for the organic industry."

According to a 2009 survey of 937 members of the Society of Toxicology conducted by George Mason University, 79% of respondents thought EWG overstated the risks of chemicals, while only 3% thought it underestimated them and 18% thought they were accurate. Quackwatch has included EWG in its list of "questionable organisations", calling it one of "[t]he key groups that have wrong things to say about cosmetic products".

Environmental historian James McWilliams has described EWG warnings as fearmongering and misleading, and writes that there is little evidence to support its claims: "The transparency of the USDA's program in providing the detailed data is good because it reveals how insignificant these residues are from a health perspective. Unfortunately, the EWG misuses that transparency in a manipulative way to drive their fear-based, organic marketing agenda."

According to Kavin Senapathy of Science Moms, the EWG "frightens consumers about chemicals and their safety, cloaking fear mongering in a clever disguise of caring and empowerment." Her main criticisms are its use of "fundamentally flawed" methodologies for evaluating food, cosmetics, children's products, and more, and that it is "largely funded by organic companies" that its shopping recommendations benefit.

=== Dirty Dozen ===
The EWG promotes an annual list ranking pesticide residues on fruits and vegetables called the "Dirty Dozen", though it does not give readers context on what amounts regulatory agencies consider safe. The list cautions consumers to avoid conventional produce and promotes organic foods.

Scientists have stated that the list significantly overstates the risk to consumers of the listed items and that the methodology employed in constructing it "lacks scientific credibility" and "may be intentionally misleading." A 2011 study showed that the items on the list had safe levels of chemical residue or none at all. A 2011 analysis of the USDA's PDP data by Steve Savage found that 99.33% of the detectable residues were below EPA tolerance and half of the samples contained less than a hundredth those levels.

=== PFAS regulation advocacy ===
Since the early 2000s, EWG has been advocating for increasing regulations on the use of per- and polyfluoroalkyl substances (PFAS). EWG has collaborated with the Social Science Environmental Health Research Institute (SSEHRI) at Northeastern University to publish a map showing detections of PFAS in water samples across the USA.

=== Sunscreens ===
In July 2008, the EWG published an analysis of over 900 sunscreens. The report concluded that only 15% of the sunscreens met the group's criteria for safety and effectiveness. It called on the FDA to require that manufacturers provide more detailed information about the level of sun protection provided for both UVA and UVB radiation. Representatives of the sunscreen industry called the 2008 sunscreen report inaccurate.

=== Vaccines ===
In 2004, the EWG authored a report titled "Overloaded? New science, new insights about mercury and autism in children", promoting an unfounded link between mercury preservatives in vaccines and autism, a purported link that had elicited much controversy, especially among anti-vaccination activists, but which no evidence supported.

=== Genetically modified food ===
The EWG has made statements opposing the scientific consensus on the safety of genetically modified (GM) food alleging its long-term safety has not been proven. The group started a campaign supported by funding from the organic food industry to require labeling of GM food and promote organic food.

=== Tap water ===
In 2005, from data compiled by "state environment and health agencies", the EWG released its Tap Water Database, which contains data collected from approximately 48,500 water utilities across the US. The city of Everett, Washington, described by the report as exceeding public health guidelines for drinking water, has criticized the report, contending that the EWG selectively chose the guidelines used to assess water quality.
