= AnnMarie Wolpe =

South African anti-apartheid activist

- Born: AnnMarie Kantor; 1 December 1930; Johannesburg, Union of South Africa
- Died: 14 February 2018 (aged 87); South Africa
- Education: University of the Witwatersrand
- Employer(s): University of Bradford, Middlesex University, University of the Western Cape, Feminist Review, Department of Education
- Notable work: The Long Way Home
- Spouse: Harold Wolpe
- Relatives: James Kantor (brother)

AnnMarie Wolpe (1 December 1930 – 14 February 2018, née Kantor) was a South African anti-apartheid activist, sociologist, feminist and writer. Her husband Harold Wolpe was also a South African anti-apartheid activist who was imprisoned along with Nelson Mandela. She fled South Africa after being arrested and interrogated. She wrote of her ordeal and she was among the initial editorial collective of Feminist Review when it was founded in 1979.

== Early life ==
AnnMarie Kantor was born 1 December 1930 in Johannesburg, daughter of Abraham and Pauline (née Braude) Kantor, Jewish immigrants from Lithuania. Her brother was James Kantor, arrested but acquitted in the Rivonia Trial.

She studied at University of the Witwatersrand, and there met Harold Wolpe (1926-1996); they married in November 1955, and had three children.

== South Africa before exile ==
Wolpe worked for the Transvaal clothing industry medical aid society, and later ran a bursary fund for African students.

Harold Wolpe was arrested in July 1963 along with Nelson Mandela and other ANC activists. During his time in prison AnnMarie smuggled files and other tools into the prison hidden in loaves of bread and a roast chicken, and communicated by notes hidden in the collars of the shirts she was allowed to take home to launder. He escaped from prison on 11 August along with three other activists, by bribing a jailer. After his escape, AnnMarie was arrested and brutally interrogated overnight. Fearing further arrest she flew to England, leaving her three children (aged six, five and under six months, the baby recovering from serious pneumonia) with family friends. The children joined her within weeks, and her husband arrived in England in October via Swaziland. She later wrote a book, The Long Way Home, describing this part of her life.

== England 1963-1991 ==
Wolpe and her husband both built up academic careers in England. She first worked in the University of Bradford's Yugoslav studies unit. She then moved to the future Middlesex University and established its Women's Studies programme, gaining a Ph.D. there.

She was one of the initial editorial collective for the Feminist Review, and co-edited a work Feminism and Materialism with Annette Kuhn.

== Return to South Africa ==
In 1991 the Wolpes returned to South Africa. She worked at University of the Western Cape, initially in its Centre for Adult and Continuing Education and then in the Education Policy Unit until she retired in 1998. She then led a Gender Equity Task Team for the Ministry of Education and set up the Gender Equity Directorate in the Department of Education.

Wolpe died in her sleep on 14 February 2018, aged 87, and was survived by three children and six grandchildren.

== Selected publications ==
- Wolpe, AnnMarie (1977). Some processes in sexist education. Explorations in feminism. Women's Research and Resources Centre Publications.
- Kuhn, Annette; Wolpe, AnnMarie (1978). Feminism and materialism : women and modes of production. Routledge. ISBN 978-0710000743.
- Wolpe, AnnMarie; Donald, James (1983). Is there anyone here from education?. Pluto. ISBN 0861047362.
- Wolpe, AnnMarie (1988). Within School Walls: role of discipline, sexuality and the curriculum. Routledge. (Reprinted Routledge, 2014, ISBN 978-0415750684)
- Wolpe, AnnMarie (1994). The Long Way Home. Virago. ISBN 1853815578.
