= Workers Party of South Africa =

South African political party

The Workers Party of South Africa (WPSA) was a Trotskyist organisation in South Africa. It published a newspaper, Spark.

The South African Trotskyist movement originated with disaffected former members of the Communist Party of South Africa in the early 1930s who had established contact with the American Trotskyist paper The Militant and formed small groups, the Cape Lenin Club in Cape Town in 1933 and the Bolshevik-Leninist League in Johannesburg in 1934, led by Ralph Lee and Murray Gow Purdy.

In early 1935, the majority of the Cape Town-based Lenin Club and the Johannesburg-based Bolshevik-Leninist League of South Africa voted to form the Workers Party of South Africa. Its first initiative was to intervene in the All-African Convention, called to oppose the Hertzog Bills, which aimed to complete the implementation of apartheid in the nation. The group opposed both the system of apartheid and calls for black nationalism.

The group had links to the Non-European Unity Movement (NEUM), and the National Liberation League.

By 1939, the group went underground and began working solely through the NEUM.
