= African Peoples' Democratic Union of Southern Africa =

Political group in Southern Africa

The African Peoples' Democratic Union of Southern Africa (APDUSA) is a Trotskyist political group in South Africa. Formed in 1961, it emerged from the Non-European Unity Movement, and was closely associated with I.B. Tabata, a leading Marxist who died in exile in 1990. Its aim was to end white minority domination of South Africa and ultimately achieve a socialist revolution supported by an alliance of the urban proletariat and peasantry. APDUSA was involved in armed struggle in the 1960s, but suffered heavy repression from the apartheid state. APDUSA remains active today and publishes the APUDUSAN Newsletter.
