= Djaili Amadou Amal =

Cameroonian writer and activist

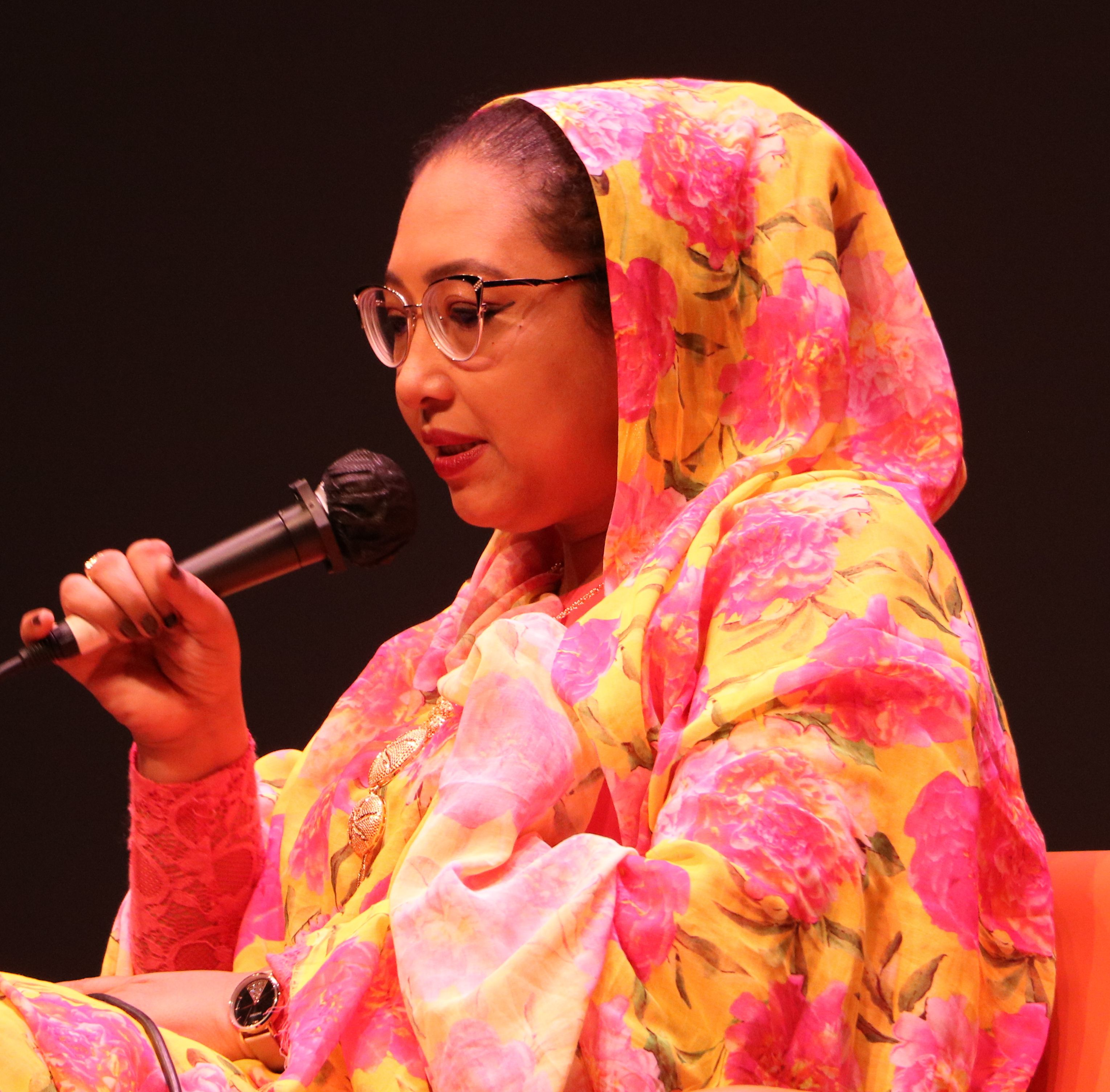
- Djaili Amadou Amal at the Festival Atlantide, Nantes, 2021
- Born: 1975 (age 50–51); Diamare, Cameroon

Djaili Amadou Amal is a Cameroonian writer, and feminist activist.

== Life ==
Djaili Amadou Amal is a Fula, native to the Diamare in the Far North region of Cameroon. She grew up in the region's principal city, Maroua. She writes of the Fulbe culture and explores the social problems of both a contemporary and a traditional nature. Her work confronts the problems of women in Fulani society, as well as social problems in her region, the Sahel, especially the discrimination against women. Among her novels is Walaande, which is a Fulfulde word for conjugal unity, addressing the issue of polygamy among the Fulani who commonly practice polygamy. Walaande tells the story of four wives who have conceded to "the art of sharing a husband".

Two of her other novels are Mistiriijo and La Mangeuse d'âmes (in English, The Eater of Souls). She writes mostly in the French language.

Her novelThe Impatients was shortlisted for the 2020 Prix Goncourt and won the Prix Goncourt des Lycéens.

In 2012, she founded and runs Femmes du Sahel, an organization dedicated to promoting the education and development of women in the Sahel region.

== Recognition ==
On 2 December 2020, Djaïli Amadou with her book Les Impatientes won the 33rd French Literary award Prix Goncourt des Lycéens as the first female African writer to arrive the finals of the literary competition. The book will also be listed as the Choix Goncourt de l'Orient on 8 December 2020, the Choix Goncourt UK on 18 March 2021, and the Choix Goncourt Tunisia on April 3, 2021. The German translation of the title was nominated in March 2023 in a category to be awarded in October by the youth jury of the Deutscher Jugendliteraturpreis.

Back in Cameroon, the writer was appointed UNICEF Goodwill Ambassador on 5 March 2021 to support the organization in its advocacy for the rights of children.

== Bibliography ==
- Walaande, l'art de partager un mari, éditions Ifrikiya, Yaoundé, 2010, 134 p., ISBN 9956-473-35-9
- Mistiriijo, la mangeuse d'âmes, éditions Ifrikiya, Yaoundé, 2013, ISBN 978-9956-473-85-4
- Munyal, les larmes de la patience, éditions Proximité, Yaoundé, 2017 ISBN 978-9956-429-54-7
- Les Impatientes, éditions Emmanuelle Collas, Paris, 2020, 252p., ISBN 978-2-490155-25-5 – prix Goncourt des lycéens 2020.
- Cœur du Sahel, Paris, Emmanuelle Collas, 2022, 364 p
- Le Harem du roi, Paris, J'ai Lu, 2024, 288 p
- Espoir, Paris, Emmanuelle Collas, 2026, 180 p
