= Dan O'Meara =

Dan O'Meara (born 1948) is an intellectual and university professor of South African origin, now working in Quebec.

Formerly a member of the African National Congress (ANC), O'Meara is a committed activist renowned for his position in the fight against apartheid. His earlier work analyzed ideology among Afrikaners in South Africa. His more recent work focuses on Great Britain and the United States, taking a critical approach to studying international relations.

== Published works ==
Volkscapitalisme - Class, capital and ideology in the development of Afrikaner Nationalism 1934–1948, Cambridge University Press, 1983

Forty lost years: the apartheid state and the politics of the National Party, 1948–1994, Ravan Press, 1996
