= Non-European Unity Movement =

South African political party

The Non-European Unity Movement (NEUM) was a Trotskyist organisation formed in South Africa in 1943. It had links to the Workers Party of South Africa (WPSA), the first countrywide Trotskyist organisation, and was initially conceived as a broad protest front. It proposed a 10 Point Programme of radical reforms. It stressed non-racialism, meaning that it rejected race-based organising (and the concept of race itself), unlike the main nationalist groups of the time, was highly critical of the South African Communist Party and the African National Congress, and made a principle of non-collaboration with the apartheid regime and its allies

The movement developed a substantial influence in the Cape Province, including Pondoland, and had some role in the 1950-1961 Pondoland peasant revolt, but split in 1957. The faction around Isaac Bangani Tabata formed a new African Peoples' Democratic Union of Southern Africa (APDUSA) in 1961, and the Unity Movement of South Africa (UMSA) in exile in 1964, and engaged in armed struggle. The tradition's influence was wider than its membership: for example, notable Marxist Neville Alexander, who helped found the Yu Chi Chan Club (YCCC) in 1961, and the National Liberation Front (NLF) in 1962, came from a NEUM / APUDSA background. Until the 1970s, the Unity Movement tradition was arguably the largest Trotskyist current in southern Africa.

All of its sectors suffered heavily from 1960s apartheid repression, some ending up on Robben Island. However, the current survived, both in the form of APDUSA, and the launching of the separate New Unity Movement in 1985. Both wings continue to operate. APDUSA remains active today and publishes the APUDUSAN Newsletter, following in the steps of APDUSA Views from the 1980s, and Unity from the 1960s.
