= List of people from Białystok =

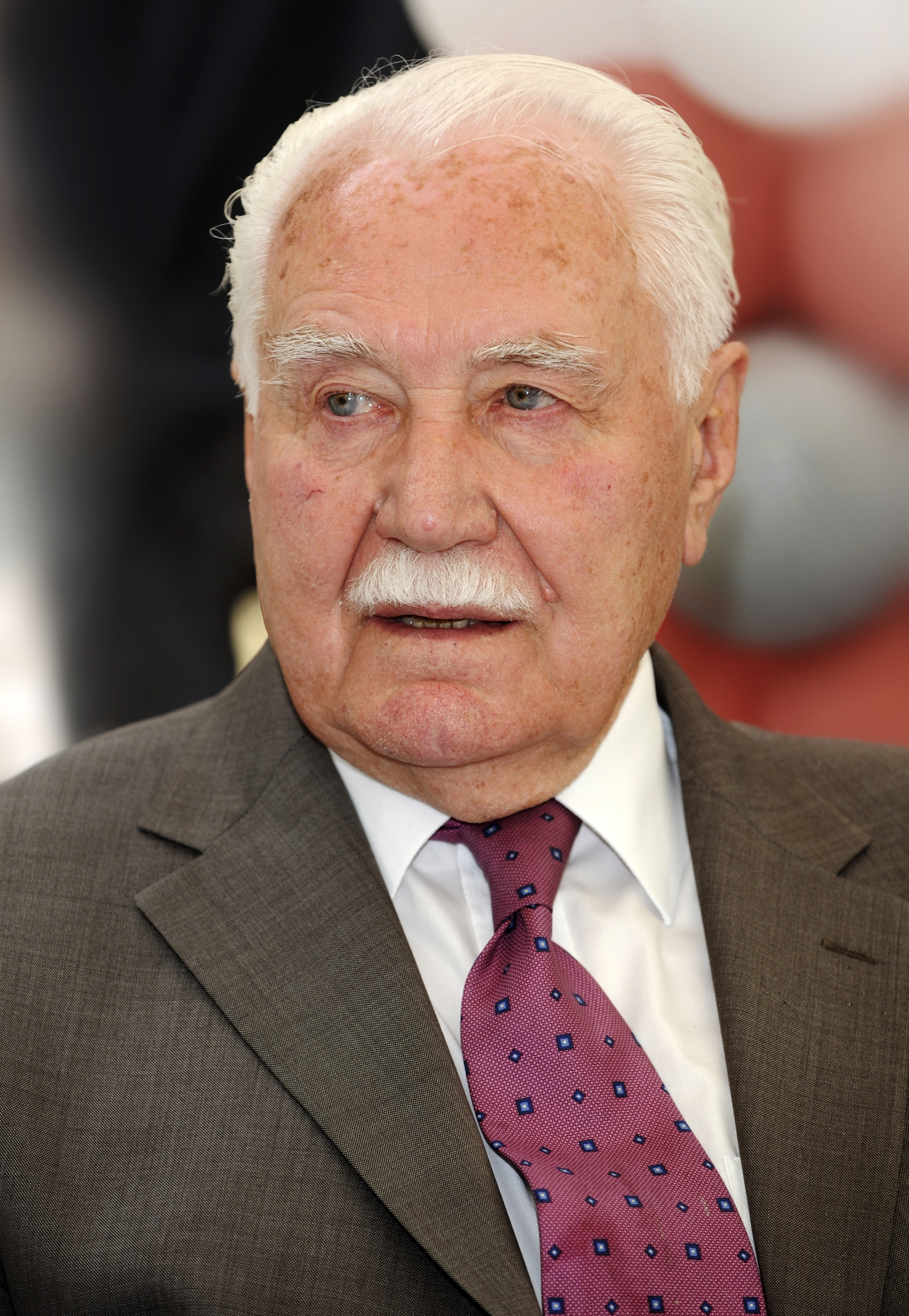
Ryszard Kaczorowski, President of the Republic of Poland in exile

This is a sub-article to Białystok

Over the centuries Białystok has produced a number of persons who have provided unique contributions to the fields of science, language, politics, religion, sports, visual arts and performing arts. This environment was created in the mid 18th century by the patronage of Jan Klemens Branicki for the arts and sciences. A list of recent notable persons includes, but is not limited to:

- Ryszard Kaczorowski, last émigré President of the Republic of Poland
- Naftali Herz Halevy, first Ashkenazi Chief Rabbi of Jaffa
- L. L. Zamenhof, the creator of Esperanto
- Albert Sabin, co-developer of the polio vaccine
- Izabella Scorupco, actress
- Max Weber, painter.

== Fictional ==
- Max Białystok of The Producers (1968 film)

== Birthplace ==
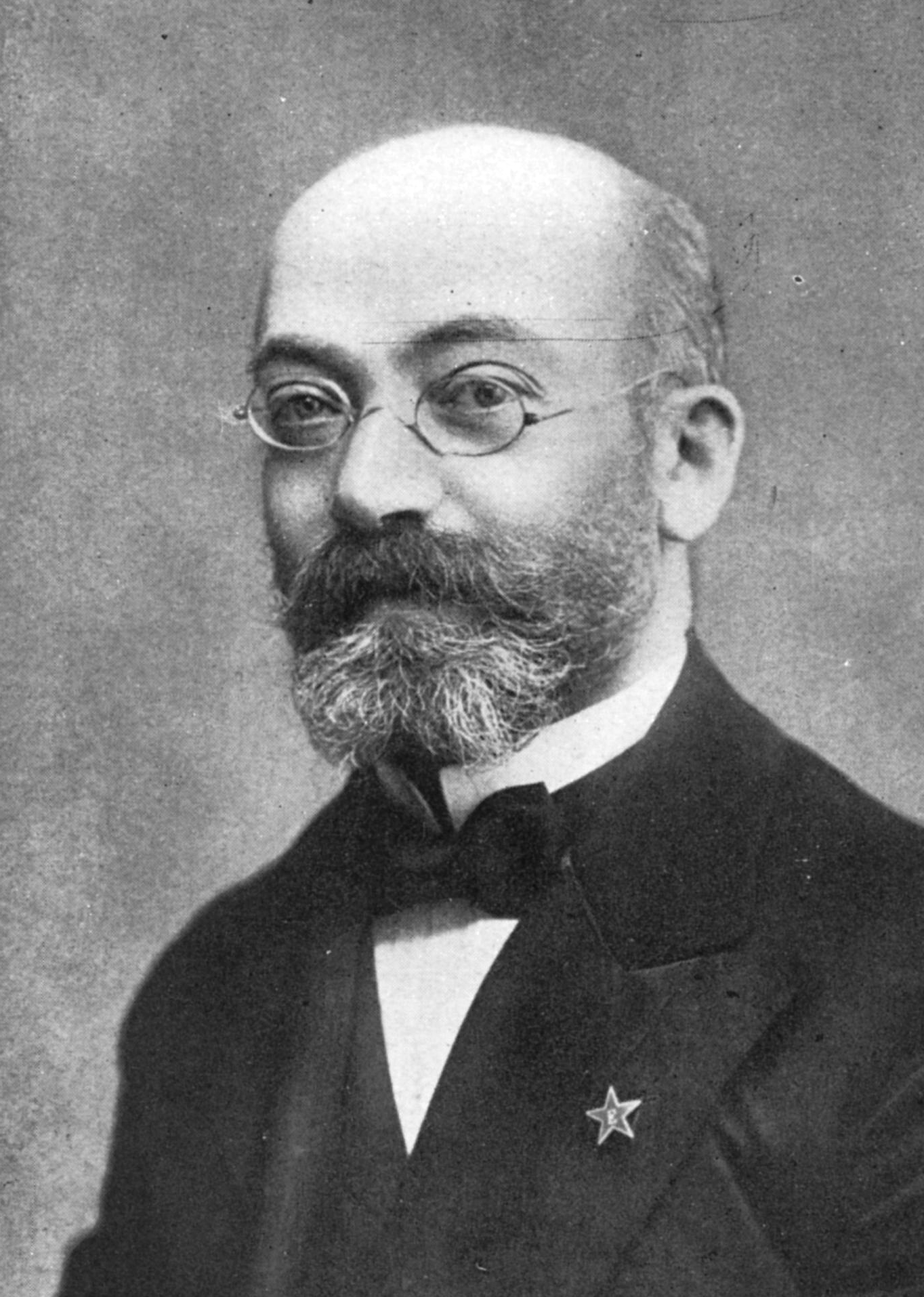
L. L. Zamenhof, the creator of Esperanto

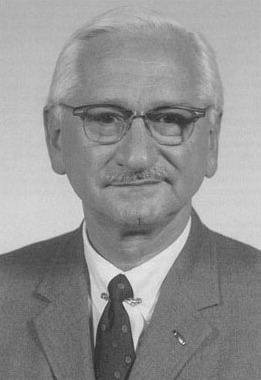
Albert Sabin, MD, medical researcher and co-developer of the oral polio vaccine

- Tomasz Bagiński, Polish illustrator, animator and director, (The Cathedral)
- Batushka, black metal band
- Sala Burton (née Galante), United States Representative from California
- Marek Citko, Polish former footballer
- Aleksandra Ekster, painter and designer
- Tomasz Frankowski, Polish footballer
- Hermann Friedmann, philosopher
- Mariusz Gogol, former professional footballer
- Fabio Grobart, Cuban revolutionary and mentor of Fidel Castro
- Khayele Grober, theatre actor and playwright
- Małgorzata Guzowska, Polish heptathlete
- Ryszard Kaczorowski, last émigré President of the Republic of Poland
- Abraham Kaplansky, Canadian printer
- Shlomo Kaplansky (1884-1950), Israeli politician and President of the Technion – Israel Institute of Technology
- Bartosz Kaśnikowski, Polish footballer
- Boris Kaufman, cinematographer
- Mikhail Kaufman, cinematographer and photographer
- Ewa Kracowska, a Jewish holocaust survivor who fought in the Jewish resistance movement during World War II
- Ernst Krenkel, Arctic explorer
- Jarosław Kazberuk, Polish rally driver
- Wojciech Kowalewski, Poland national team goalkeeper
- Jarosław Kozakiewicz, polish artist
- Rufus Learsi, American educator and author
- Abraham ben Eliezer Lipman Lichtstein, rabbi, author and Talmudic scholar
- Maxim Litvinov, Russian revolutionary and prominent Soviet diplomat
- Natalia Maliszewska, short track speed skater
- Marika, singer and songwriter
- Jacek Markiewicz, Polish football player
- Wojciech Nowicki, hammer thrower, Olympic medallist
- Yakov Perelman, Soviet popular science writer
- Mariusz Piekarski, Polish football player
- Samuel Pisar, lawyer and writer
- Albert Sabin, co-developer of the polio vaccine; President of the Weizmann Institute of Science
- Izabella Scorupco, actress
- Adam Rayski, French Resistance leader
- Simon Segal, painter
- Joanna Siedlecka, writer and journalist
- Radosław Sobolewski, Polish football player
- Mischa Spoliansky, composer
- Eleazar Sukenik, archaeologist
- Aneta Todorczuk-Perchuć, Polish actress and vocalist
- George Trilling, president of the American Physical Society
- Łukasz Tupalski, Polish football player
- Marek Twardowski, Polish sprint canoer
- Robert Tyszkiewicz, Polish politician
- Ephraim Urbach, Talmud scholar and recipient of the Israel Prize
- Marek Wasiluk, Polish football player
- Max Weber, painter
- Lucyna Wlazło-Bajewska Krzywonos, Polish glider pilot and gliding instructor.
- Dziga Vertov (Kaufman), a Soviet documentary film and newsreel director
- Dariusz Zakrzewski, Polish professional road racing cyclist
- L. L. Zamenhof, the creator of Esperanto
- Hans Ziglarski, German boxer
- Mirosław Złotkowski, Polish Greco-Roman wrestler

== Inhabitants ==
- Abraham Samuel Herschberg (1858–1943), Polish-Jewish writer and scholar
- Michał Kulesza, painter.
- Paweł Małaszyński, Polish TV and film actor.

During the 2006 mayoral elections, a humorous and peculiar TV spot of one of the candidates, Krzysztof Kononowicz of the electoral committee Podlaskie of the 21st Century (Polish: Podlasie XXI Wieku), attracted some notoriety for his purposely unsophisticated political advertisement, first aired on local TV and featured heavily on YouTube. Within several days, over 3 million Internet users had seen the commercial on YouTube, posted by Kononowicz's electoral committee, with additional exposure on Polish national TV.
