= Grober =

Grober may refer to:

- Punta Grober, mountain part of the Monte Rosa Alps in the Pennine Alps, Italy
- Khayele Grober (1898 - 1978), theatre actor and playwright
- Sarah-Emanuela Gröber (born 1986), German politician

== See also ==
- Groeber
