= Kaplansky =

Kaplansky is a surname. Notable people with the surname include:

- Abraham Kaplansky (1860–1939), Canadian printer
- Kalmen Kaplansky (1912–1997), Canadian labour and human rights activist
- Irving Kaplansky (1917–2006), Canadian mathematician
- Lucy Kaplansky (born 1960), an American folk musician, daughter of Irving Kaplansky
- Shlomo Kaplansky (1884–1950), Zionist politician and president of Technion – Israel Institute of Technology

== See also ==
- Kaplan (surname)
- Kaplinsky
