= List of demonstrations at the University of Cape Town =

== 1950 ==
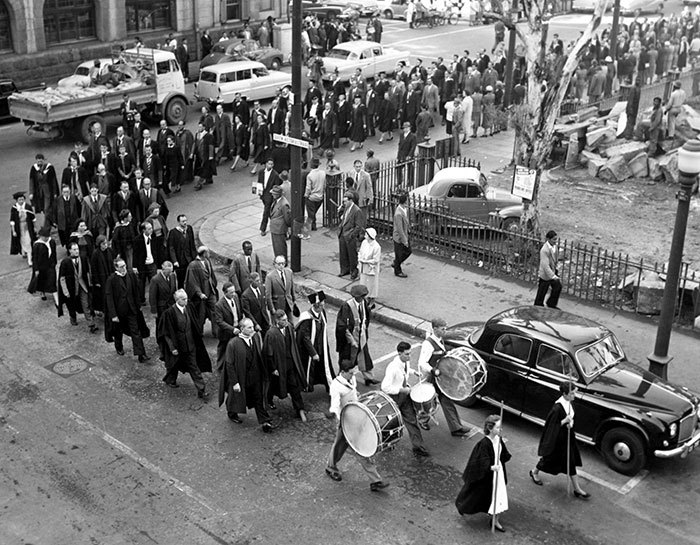
March through the streets of Cape Town by staff and students of UCT in protest against the Universities Bill – 7 June 1957

1957–1959, June, the ruling National Party embarked on the destruction of academic freedom and the imposition of university apartheid. In June 1957, UCT students and staff marched through the streets of Cape Town in protest against the Separate University Education Bill. The bill was repealed, only to be replaced by the Extension of University Education Act of 1959, which made it a criminal offence for a black student to register at a formerly open university (open to all races) without special permission from the government.

A bearing a "torch of academic freedom", all night torch vigils were held, Jameson Hall. A protest meeting in Parliament building for its second reading. Neville Rubin, Chair of the SRC, torch and he extinguished the flame. Joan Tyler relights the Torch of Academic Freedom at the 34th TB Davie Memorial Lecture in 1994.

== 1960 ==
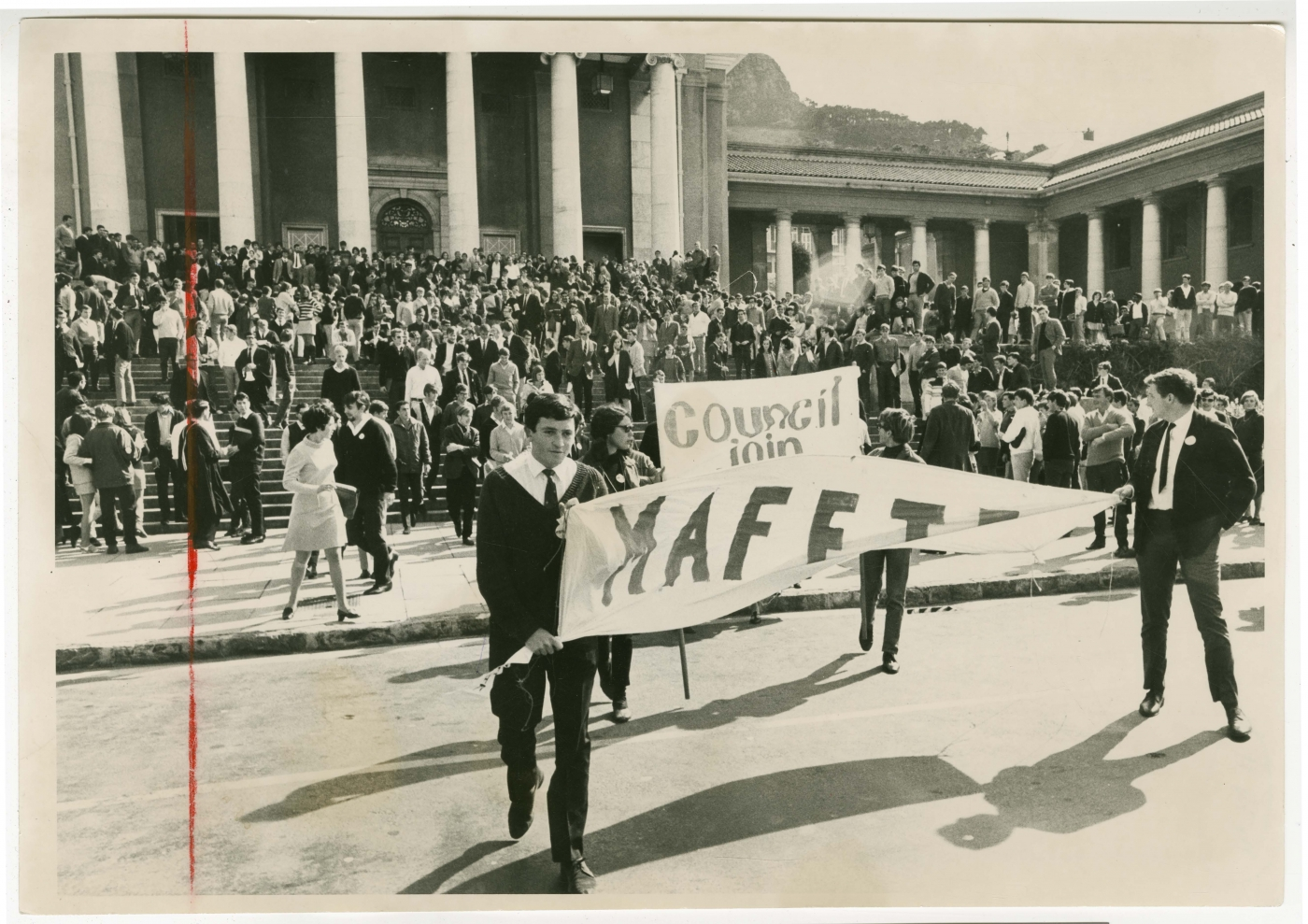
UCT's students surrounding Jameson hall (today Sarah Baartman Hall) on 15 August 1968

1968, August 14–22, University of Cape Town students, with the support of many staff, held an anti-apartheid sit-in for 9 days, taking over the Bremner Building (administration). They protested government intervention that pressured the university to rescind its appointment of a "non-White" professor, Archibald Mafeje. The protest crumbled after the final night, when anti-protestors stormed the building with weapons and dogs, and photos of some protestors were passed around to create targets for the anti-protestors.

A plaque honoring Mafeje now presides in front of the Bremner meeting room that the protestors held throughout their action. The sit-in gained international coverage and support. The BBC interviewed Mafeje in London, who said, "I had heard that the Student's National Union had made a resolution about this at a conference during winter vacation, but I didn't expect that when they went back to the University at the beginning of their third term, they were planning to do something about it."

Students at other universities, including University of Natal and the University of Witwatersrand, voted for full support of the UCT action at the time. The government successfully intervened against Witwatersrand's sympathy march. Mafeje was never hired, and the university has since apologized to him and his family and renamed the meeting room the Mafeje Room in his honor.

The incident came to be known as The Mafeje Affair.

== 1970 ==
1972, June, Students holding a protest meeting about apartheid education on the steps of St. George's Cathedral, Cape Town in the misguided belief that, because it was private property and a church, they would be safe, were baton-charged. Fifty-one students were charged with breaking municipal regulations. Further protests in Cape Town city were banned under the Riotous Assemblies Act, 1956 and a protest about the police action, again on St George's Cathedral steps, was dispersed with tear gas and rubber batons. A further protest, this time on the steps of Jameson Hall at the University of Cape Town ("UCT") was also dispersed by the police with rubber batons, dogs and tear-gas. The Council of UCT under the leadership of the principal and vice-chancellor, Sir Richard Luyt, obtained an interdict to prevent the police entering its private property.

In the ensuing weeks, small groups of students (to avoid constituting an illegal assembly) stood on a building in the Rose Garden of UCT, overlooking De Waal Drive, to continue the protest.

In the course of these protests a large number of students were arrested and charged under the Riotous Assemblies Act. Some were convicted by magistrates but later acquitted on appeal. Some students, funded by the National Union of South African Students ("NUSAS") took the government to court and obtained out of court settlements, which were given to NUSAS.

== 1980 ==
1987, April, the police invaded the UCT campus in retaliation to student march in Rondebosch, and placard protests on the verge, entrances and rugby field. Teargas and rubber bullets used against 100 students. Cops sjambok women in the Jagger Library, causing over 500 students to become involved in unrest that saw some arsonists torch an SAB-Miller delivery truck behind the Students Union.

1988, August, 3000 students marched in opposition to the banning of the End Conscription Campaign

== 2000 ==
2006, October, a go-carting event turned nasty as students rioted in support of a "bergie" or homeless person trying to participate in the event.

== 2010 ==
2010, October, an LGBTI awareness week was held at UCT, with the official website of the university turning pink to mark the event and guest speakers addressing students on Jammie plaza throughout the week. Vandals burned to ashes a pink cupboard shrine, set up in the middle of Jammie plaza to raise awareness about human rights violations against non-heterosexuals. This destruction of the pink cupboard prompted a protest that was held on Upper Campus during that week.

2013 "We Say Enough!", have been called to express their collective outrage at the crimes of violence perpetuated across the nation at a march and rally at the University of Cape Town on Wednesday, 20 February.

2015, March. Students protested to try to have a statue of Cecil John Rhodes removed from the campus. This became known as the Rhodes Must Fall campaign.

2016, February. In response to the poor management of the university's residence system, which resulted in hundreds of students were left homeless, protesters erected a shack on one of the university's main roads. This has since been dubbed the 'Shackville' protests.

2019 Uyinene Mrwetyana was a University of Cape Town student, was raped and murdered, remembrances and memorial services. A large protest occurred at the World Economic Forum on Africa on 4 September . An even larger protest outside Houses of Parliament, Cape Town the next day which gathered an attendance of several thousand people.
