= Kaplinsky =

Kaplinsky or Kaplinski is a Polish surname of Jewish origin. The surname is derived from the Polish word kaplan which became vernacular equivalent of the word Kohen, which, in turn, is a Hebrew word for priest. Notable people with the surname include:

- Alan Kaplinsky (born 1945), American jurist and lawyer
- Jerzy Kapliński (1901–1943), Estonian philologist, father of Jaan
- Jaan Kaplinski (1941–2021), Estonian poet, philosopher, and culture critic
- Leon Kaplinski (1824–1873), Polish painter and political activist
- Moshe Kaplinsky (born 1957), Israeli general
- Natasha Kaplinsky (born 1972), English newsreader
- Raphael Kaplinsky (born 1946), American academic, father of Natasha
- Yoheved Kaplinsky (born 1947), Israeli-American pianist and pedagogue

== See also ==
- Cohen (surname)
- Kaminsky (surname)
- Kapłański (surname)
- 29528 Kaplinski
