= Groeber =

Groeber is a German surname. Notable people with the surname include:

- Adolf Groeber (1854–1919), German politician (Centre Party)
- John Groeber (1903 – 1973), missionary who founded the Serima mission station for the Swiss Bethlehem Mission in Rhodesia
- Gast Groeber (born 1960), writer from Luxembourg
- Hermann Groeber (1865 – 1935), German painter
- Pablo Groeber (1885–1964), German geologist known

== See also ==
- Grober (disambiguation)
