= Martin Plaut =

Journalist and academic (born 1950)

- Born: May 1950, 1950; Cape Town
- Education: University of Warwick, University of Cape Town Faculty of Humanities, University of the Witwatersrand Faculty of Humanities
- Occupations: Journalist, analyst, university teacher, political analyst, opinion writer
- Employers: BBC Radio London (1984–2012); BBC World Service (1984–2012); King's College London (2020–); Labour Party (Moldova) (1979–1983); Labour Party (1979–1983); University of London (2013–)

Martin Plaut (born 1950) is a journalist and academic specialising in conflicts in Africa, especially the Horn of Africa. He worked as a BBC News journalist from 1984 to 2012 and is a member of Chatham House. As of 2019, Plaut was a senior research fellow at the Institute of Commonwealth Studies of the University of London.

== Childhood and education ==
Martin Plaut was born in May 1950 in Cape Town, South Africa, to a furniture designer father and an artist mother. Plaut attended Cape Town High School and worked in his father's shop in Cape Town from 1969 to 1973. He obtained a degree in social science from the University of Cape Town, where he also participated in the sit-in during the Mafeje affair in 1968. He obtained an honours degree in industrial relations from the University of Witwatersrand, and in 1977 finished a master of arts degree at the University of Warwick. Plaut joined National Union of South African Students while studying.

== Anti-apartheid activities ==
Plaut joined the British Labour Party. He held senior roles in the party, connecting it with the internal resistance to the South African apartheid system. Plaut resisted the wish by the African National Congress (ANC) to be considered the "sole legitimate representative" of South Africans, since other major resistance groups, including the Pan Africanist Congress were recognised as legitimate by the Labour Party. The ANC unsuccessfully pressured the Labour Party to sack Plaut.

== Research and journalism ==
Plaut worked for two years as an associate fellow at Chatham House, leading research into Africa, afterwards remaining a member.

Plaut joined the BBC in 1984, reporting mainly on the Horn of Africa and southern Africa, and parts of West Africa. He became the Africa editor for BBC World Service News. In 1990, he analysed the role of South African trade unions and left-wing parties, their relation to anti-apartheid activities, and prospects for democracy. Plaut was based in London, typically visiting Africa 3–4 times a year. In December 2007 he covered the Christmas massacre in Niangara by the Lord's Resistance Army. After visiting the site of the massacre, conducting an interview and safely returning to a safer location, he had difficulties explaining to editors in London that revisiting the scene to refilm in a way preferred by editors was impossible. Plaut retired from the BBC in 2012.

In 2017, Plaut described Eritrea as a "mafia state", in the sense that Constitution of Eritrea was written and ratified but not implemented; there had not been any elections since independence; Eritrea had "no annual budget"; and Eritrea was effectively ruled in an "arbitrary and personal" way by president Isaias Afwerki together with senior military officers and officials from the People's Front for Democracy and Justice (PFDJ). Plaut stated that mafia-like characteristics included Isaias controlling Eritrea "with ruthless efficiency", controlling Eritreans abroad by threats and intimidation, and Eritrea having a "covert network of illegal activities" run by close colleagues of Isaias, acting "more like a Mafia don enforcing his will than a legitimate head of state". Plaut attributed the mafia-like nature of the Eritrean state in 2017 to the historical role of the Eritrean People's Revolutionary Party, a Leninist party that secretly controlled the much broader Eritrean People's Liberation Front in the fight for independence. The major illegal activities listed by Plaut included human trafficking; a covert parallel economy in hard currency, dominated by a 2% Rehabilitation Tax on the Eritrean diaspora; and surveillance and intimidation of the Eritrean diaspora.

In 2017, Plaut argued that the quality of reporting on African conflicts by Western media had worsened due to budget drops, fewer correspondents in Africa, and difficulties in persuading editors to fund journalists' travel to Africa. He stated that careful preparation and having a strong support team, as was his case at the BBC, is "essential for a successful assignment".

As of 2019, Plaut was a senior research fellow at the Institute of Commonwealth Studies of the University of London. His 2025 book, Unbroken Chains: A 5,000 year history of African Enslavement, was described by History Reclaimed as an "excellent job" reviewing the history of slavery in Africa, though with some "sources [that] are not always reliable", such as on the late 19th century use of slaves by European expeditions in the interior of Africa.

== Harassment ==
When interviewed by Amnesty International in 2019, Plaut stated that he had been harassed by PFDJ members and supporters several times. At a 3 February 2014 University of London conference, Plaut was shouted at and accused of taking bribes by the First Secretary of the Eritrean embassy. On 30 November 2018, he was lured into a meeting at a café in London, splashed with a bucketful of liquid and filmed by the attacker and other Eritreans, who called Plaut a "traitor". The attacker was prosecuted.

== Works ==
- Jacquin-Berdal, Dominique; Plaut, Martin (2005). Unfinished Business: Eritrea and Ethiopia at War. Red Sea Press. ISBN 978-1-56902-216-0.
- Plaut, Martin; Holden, Paul. Who rules South Africa?. Jonathan Ball Publishers SA. ISBN 978-1868424252.
- Plaut, Martin; Whitehead (Journalist), Andrew (2014). Curious Kentish Town. Five Leaves Publications. ISBN 978-1-910170-06-9.
- Plaut, Martin; Whitehead (Journalist), Andrew (10 October 2015). Curious Camden Town. Five Leaves Publications. ISBN 978-1-910170-23-6.
- Plaut, Martin (1 October 2016). Promise and Despair: The First Struggle for a Non-Racial South Africa. Jacana Media. ISBN 978-1431423750.
- Plaut, Martin (2016). Understanding Eritrea: Inside Africa's Most Repressive State. Oxford University Press. ISBN 978-0-19-066959-1.
- Onslow, Sue; Plaut, Martin (5 March 2018). Robert Mugabe. Ohio University Press. ISBN 978-0-8214-4638-6.
- Plaut, Martin; Plessis, Carien Du (2019). Understanding South Africa. Oxford University Press. ISBN 978-1-78738-204-6.
- Plaut, Martin (2022). Dr Abdullah Abdurahman: South Africa's First Elected Black Politician. Africa World Press. ISBN 978-1-56902-798-1.
- Plaut, Martin; Vaughan, Sarah (2023). Understanding Ethiopia's Tigray War. London: Hurst & company. ISBN 9781787388116.
- Plaut, Martin (28 August 2025). Unbroken Chains: A 5,000-Year History of African Enslavement. Hurst Publishers. ISBN 978-1-80526-465-1.
