= Raphie Kaplinsky =

English professor

Raphael Kaplinsky
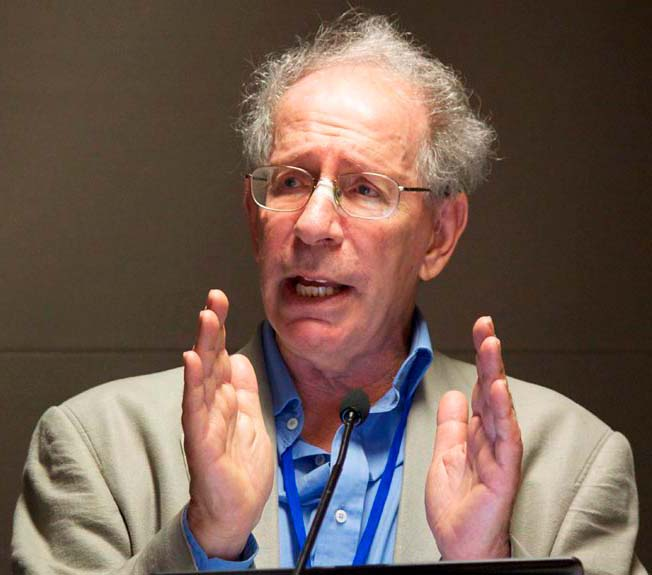
- Kaplinsky in 2022
- Born: 31 December 1946 (age 79); South Africa
- Spouse: Catherine
- Children: 2, including Natasha Kaplinsky, Benjamin Jacob Kaplinsky
- Website: https://raphiekaplinsky.com/

Raphael Malcolm Kaplinsky (born 31 December 1946) is an Honorary Professor at the Science Policy Research Unit and an Emeritus Professorial Fellow at the Institute of Development Studies, University of Sussex. In 2024 he was awarded an Honorary Doctorate by the University of Johannesburg, South Africa. He was an active and well-known opponent to Apartheid in South Africa during the 1960s, and played a leading role in 1968 in the Mafeje affair. Kaplinsky was not allowed to return to his country of birth until Nelson Mandela was released from prison in 1990, after which he played an active role in policy development at the national and regional levels. He spent the bulk of his professional career at the University of Sussex where he led research programmes on industrial and technology policy and on Global value chain. He led and participated in a number of Advisory Missions to governments in Africa, Asia, Latin America, the Caribbean and Europe.

== Early life ==
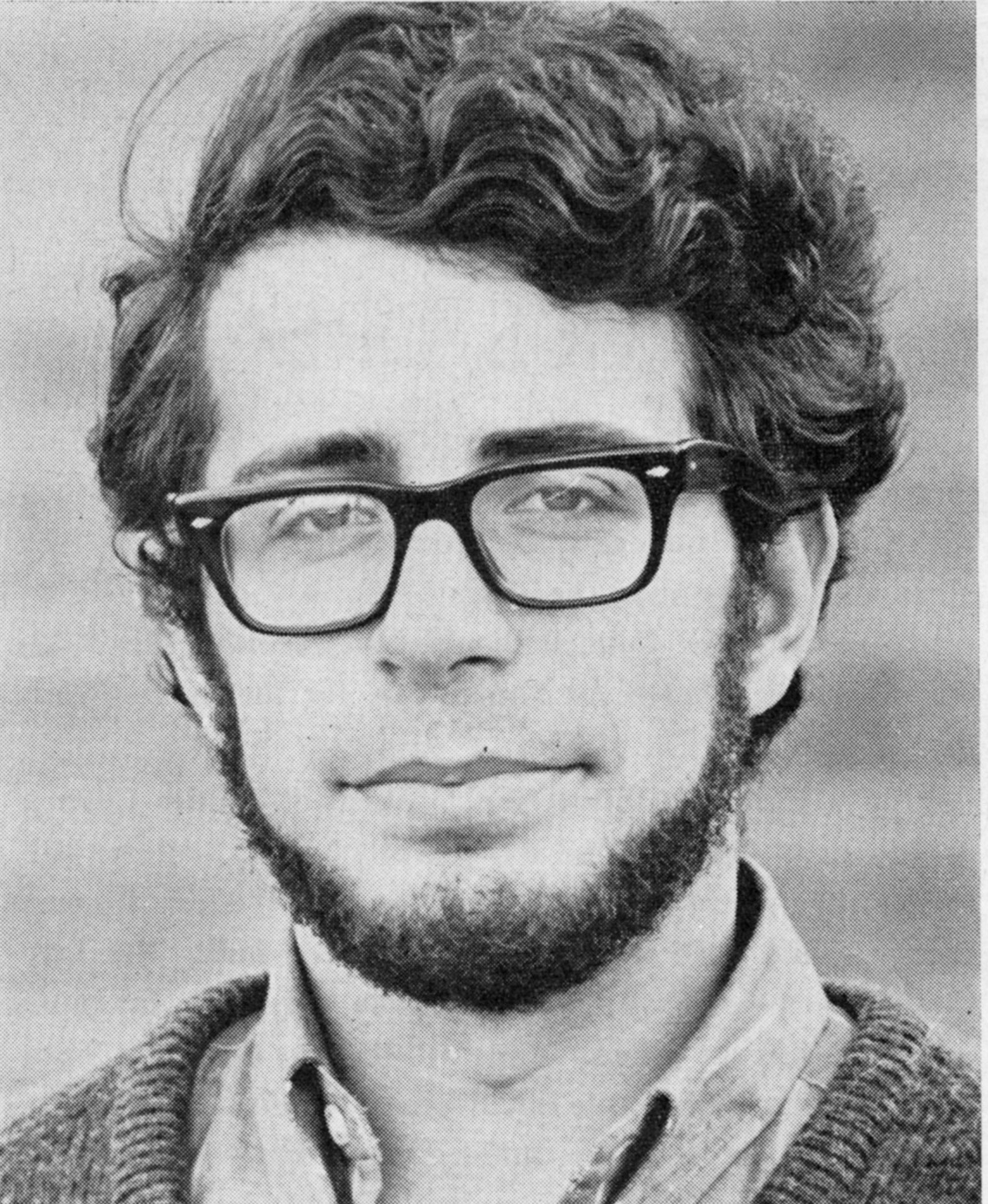
Kaplinsky at UCT in 1968

Kaplinsky's father Morris, a Polish Jew, emigrated to South Africa from the town of Slonim, now in Belarus in 1929. His mother was born in South Africa to Jewish emigres from Lithuania. As a student Kaplinsky took part in Cape Town University's Mafeje affair protests which resulted in him having to flee South Africa to the United Kingdom in the 1960s.

== Personal life ==
Kaplinsky married Catherine Charlewood, a psychoanalyst in 1969. They have a daughter, Natasha Kaplinsky, a TV presenter (born 1972) a son, Benjamin Kaplinsky, a technology lawyer (born 1975) and four grandchildren. His daughter, Natasha Kaplinsky with her husband Justin have two children, Arlo and Angelica. His son Benjamin Kaplinsky and his wife Nicole have 2 children, a daughter Eva and a son Campbell.

== Selected bibliography ==
=== Books ===
- Kaplinsky, Raphael (1978). Readings on the multinational corporation in Kenya. Nairobi New York: Oxford University Press. ISBN 978-0-19-572445-5.
- Kaplinsky, Raphael (1982). Computer-aided design: electronics, comparative advantage and development. New York: Macmillan. ISBN 978-0-02-949520-9.
- Kaplinsky, Raphael (1984). Sugar processing: the development of a Third-World technology. London Nairobi: Intermediate Technology Publications Africa Book Services. ISBN 978-0-903031-98-1.
- Kaplinsky, Raphael (1984). Automation: the technology and society. Harlow, Essex, UK: Longman. ISBN 978-0-582-90203-9.
- Kaplinsky, Raphael (1984). Third World industrialisation in the 1980s: open economies in a closing world. London Totowa, New Jersey: F. Cass. ISBN 978-0-7146-3240-7.
- Kaplinsky, Raphael; Hoffman, Kurt (1988). Driving force: the global restructuring of technology, labour, and investment in the automobile and components industries. Boulder, Colorado: Westview Press. ISBN 978-0-8133-7502-1.
- Kaplinsky, Raphael; Cooper, Charles (1989). Technology and development in the third industrial revolution. London Savage, Maryland: F. Cass. ISBN 978-0-7146-3389-3.
- Kaplinsky, Raphael; et al. (1989). Cane sugar, the small-scale processing option: proceedings of a joint ITDG/IDS conference, 10-11 September 1987. London: Intermediate Technology Publications. ISBN 978-1-85339-015-9.
- Kaplinsky, Raphael (1990). The economies of small: appropriate technology in a changing world. London, UK. Washington, D.C., USA: IT Publications Appropriate Technology International. ISBN 978-1-85339-072-2.
- Kaplinsky, Raphael; Posthuma, Anne (1994). Easternisation: the spread of Japanese management techniques to developing countries. Ilford, Essex, England Portland, Oregon: F. Cass. ISBN 978-0-7146-4135-5.
- Kaplinsky, Raphael; Humphrey, John; Saraph, Prasad V. (1998). Corporate restructuring: Crompton Greaves and the challenge of globalisation. New Delhi Thousand Oaks, California: Response Books. ISBN 978-0-7619-9254-7.
- Kaplinsky, Raphael (2005). Globalization, poverty and inequality: between a rock and a hard place. Cambridge, UK Malden, Massachusetts: Polity. ISBN 978-0-7456-3554-5.
- Kaplinsky, Raphael and Farooki, Masuma (2011). How China Disrupted Global Commodities: The Reshaping of the World's Resource Sector. Routledge studies in global competition. London: Routledge.
- Kaplinsky, Raphael; Farooki, Masuma (2012). The impact of China on global commodity prices: the global reshaping of the resource sector. London New York: Routledge. ISBN 978-0-415-55686-6.
- Kaplinsky, Raphael (2021). Sustainable futures: An agenda for action. Cambridge, UK; Medford, Massachusetts: Polity. ISBN 978-1-5095-4782-1.

=== Chapters in books ===
- Kaplinsky, Raphael (1965), "Comparative advantage by design", in Langdon, Richard. Technological change and design. London, UK: Royal College of Art.
- Kaplinsky, Raphael (1983), "Accumulation at the periphery: a special case – The Seychelles", in Cohen, Robin (ed.), African islands and enclaves, London, UK: Sage Publications, pp. 195–216, ISBN 978-0-8039-1966-2.
- Kaplinsky, Raphael (1989), "'Technological revolution' and the international division of labour in manufacturing. A place for the third world?", in Kaplinsky, Raphael; Cooper, Charles (eds.), Technology and development in the third industrial revolution, London Savage, Maryland: F. Cass, pp. 5–36, ISBN 978-0-7146-3389-3.
- Kaplinsky, Raphael (2006), "How can agricultural commodity producers appropriate a greater share of value chain incomes?", in Sarris, Alexander; Hallam, David (eds.), Agricultural commodity markets and trade: new approaches to analyzing market structure and instability, Cheltenham, UK Northampton, Massachusetts: Food and Agriculture Organization of the United Nations and Edward Elgar Pub, pp. 356–379, ISBN 978-1-84542-444-2. Details.
- Kaplinsky, Raphael (2006), "Winners and losers: China's trade threats and opportunities for Africa", in Mepham, David; Wild, Leni (eds.), The new sinosphere: China in Africa, London, UK: Institute of Public Policy Research, pp. 12–22. Pdf.
- Kaplinsky, Raphael; Morris, Mike (2009), "The Asian drivers and SSA: MFA quota removal and the portents for African industrialisation?", in McCormick, Dorothy; Kuzilwa, Joseph A.; Gebre-Egziabher, Tegegne (eds.), Industrialising Africa in the era of globalisation: challenges to clothing and footwear, Nairobi, Kenya: University of Nairobi Press, ISBN 978-9966-846-86-0. Details. Pdf.
- Kaplinsky, Raphael (2009), "Two scientists for every man, woman and dog in America? How sustainable is globalisation?", in Yueh, Linda (ed.), The law and economics of globalisation: new challenges for a world in flux, Cheltenham, UK Northampton, Massachusetts: Edward Elgar, pp. 279–298, ISBN 978-1-84542-195-3. Pdf.
- Kaplinsky, Raphael; Morris, Mike (2009), "How can Sub-Saharan Africa turn the China-India threat into an opportunity", in Kremer, Monique; van Lieshout, Peter; Went, Robert (eds.), Doing good or doing better: development policies in a globalizing world, Scientific Council for Government Policy - WRR Verkenningen, Amsterdam: Amsterdam University Press, pp. 279–302, ISBN 978-90-485-0877-8. Pdf.
- Kaplinsky, Raphael (2010), "Environment, inequality, and the internal contradictions of globalization", in Wilson, Gordon; Furniss, Pamela; Kimbowa, Richard (eds.), Environment, development, and sustainability: perspectives and cases from around the world, Oxford New York Milton Keynes England: Oxford University Press in association with the Open University, pp. 149–158, ISBN 978-0-19-956064-6.
- Kaplinsky, Raphael; Farooki, Masuma (2010), "Global value chains, the crisis, and the shift in markets from the north to the south", in Cattaneo, Olivier; Gereffi, Gary; Staritz, Cornelia (eds.), Global value chains in a postcrisis world a development perspective, Washington, D.C.: World Bank, pp. 125–154, ISBN 978-0-8213-8499-2.
- Kaplinsky, Raphael (2010), "Asian drivers, commodities prices and the terms of trade", in Nissanke, Machiko; Mavrotas, George (eds.), Commodities, governance and economic development under globalization, Basingstoke England New York: Palgrave Macmillan, pp. 117–138, ISBN 978-0-230-20334-1.
- Kaplinsky, Raphael; McCormick, Dorothy; Morris, Mike (2010), "Impacts and challenges of a growing relationship between China and sub-Saharan Africa", in Padayachee, Vishnu (ed.), The political economy of Africa, London New York: Routledge, pp. 389–409, ISBN 978-0-415-48039-0. Pdf.
- Kaplinsky, Raphael (2011), "Innovation for pro-poor growth: from redistribution with growth to redistribution through growth", in Conference in Honour of Sir Richard Jolly – "From structural adjustment to human development: impact on poverty and inequality", 17–18 November 2011, Brighton.
- Kaplinsky, Raphael (2011), "What contribution can China make to inclusive growth in SSA?", in China Rising Conference, 5–6 December 2011, University of Bristol.
- Kaplinsky, Raphael; Fu, Xiaolan; Kale, Dinar (2012), "Global manufactures prices, 1988–2006: how do China's exports compare?", in Fu, Xiaolan (ed.), China's role in global economic recovery, Abingdon, Oxon New York: Routledge, pp. 127–145, ISBN 978-0-203-80325-7.
- Kaplinsky, Raphael and Morris, Mike (2012), "The structure of supply chains and their implications for export supply" in D. A. Ajakaiye and T. A. Ojeyide (eds.), Trade, Infrastructure and Development, London: Routledge.
- Kaplinsky, Raphael and Morris, Mike (2012), "Chinese Overseas FDI in Sub-Saharan Africa", in I. Alon, M. Fetscherin and P. Gugler (eds.), Chinese International Investments, Basingstoke, Palgrave Macmillan (Foreword by P. Buckley)
- Kaplinsky, Raphael (2013), "Past innovation trajectories in Latin America and current innovation trajectories in China" inG. Dutrénit, K. Lee, O. Vera-Cruz and R. Nelson (eds), Learning, capability building and development, EADI Global Development Series, Palgrave MacMillan, pp. 263–281.
- Kaplinsky, Raphael (2014), "Walking (Stumbling?) on Two Legs: Meeting SSA's Industrialization Challenge", in J. E. Stiglitz, J. Yifu Lin and E. Patel (eds.), The Industrial Policy Revolution II, International Economic Association, London: Macmillan.
- Kaplinsky, Raphael (2014), "Shudder: The Challenges to Industrial Policies in the early 21st Century in Low- and Middle-Income Economies" in R. Van Tulder, A. Verbeke and R. Strange (eds.), International Business and Sustainable Development, European International Business Association Vol. 8 Progress in International Business Research, Bingley, UK: Emerald Publishing.
- Kaplinsky, Raphael (2014), "Innovation for pro-poor growth: from redistribution with growth to redistribution through growth", in Stewart, Frances; Cornia, Giovanni A. (eds.), Towards human development new approaches to macroeconomics and inequality, Oxford, Oxfordshire: Oxford University Press, pp. 245–268, ISBN 978-0-19-870608-3.
- Kaplinsky, Raphael (2014), 'Bottom of the pyramid Innovation' and pro-poor growth in M.A. Dutz, Y. Kuznetsov, E. Lasagabaster and D. Pilat (eds.), Making Innovation Policy Work: Learning from Experimentation, Paris and New York: OECD and The World Bank.
- Kaplinsky, Raphael (2016), "Global Value Chains, Where they came from, where they are going and why this is important" in J. Weiss and M. Tribe (eds.), Handbook on Industrial Development, Abingdon: Routledge
- Kaplinsky, Raphael and M. Farooki (2017), "Raul Prebisch and the terms of trade; How things have changed…." in M. E. Margulis (ed), The Global Political Economy of Raul Prebisch, London: Routledge
- Kaplinsky, Raphael (2019), "Technology for Sustainable Development" in Machiko Nissanke and Jose Antonio Ocampo (eds.), The Palgrave Handbook of Development Economics: Critical Reflections on Globalisation and Development, London: Palgrave Macmillan.
- Kaplinsky, Raphael (2019), "Rent and inequality in global value chains" in S.Ponte, F. Gereffi and G. Raj-Reichert (eds.), Handbook on Global Value Chains, Cheltenham: Edward Elgar.

=== Journal articles ===
- Kaplinsky, Raphael (January–April 1980). "Capitalist accumulation in the periphery — the Kenyan case re-examined". Review of African Political Economy. 7 (17): 83–105. doi:10.1080/03056248008703416. JSTOR 3997953. Pdf.
- Kaplinsky, Raphael (October 1984). "The international context for industrialisation in the coming decade". The Journal of Development Studies. 21 (1): 75–96. doi:10.1080/00220388408421931.
- Kaplinsky, Raphael (December 1988). "Restructuring the capitalist labour process: some lessons from the car industry". Cambridge Journal of Economics. 12 (4): 451–470. JSTOR 23598115.
- Kaplinsky, Raphael; Cooper, Charles (June 1989). "Technology and development in the third industrial revolution" (PDF). The European Journal of Development Research. 1 (1): 1–3. doi:10.1080/09578818908426499. S2CID 155446487.
- Kaplinsky, Raphael; Cooper, Charles (June 1989). "'Technological revolution' and the international division of labour in manufacturing: A place for the Third World?". The European Journal of Development Research. 1 (1): 5–37. doi:10.1080/09578818908426500. S2CID 154973489.
- Kaplinsky, Raphael (1990). "A policy agenda for a post-apartheid South Africa". Transformation: Critical Perspectives on Southern Africa. 12: 42–52. Pdf.
- Kaplinsky, Raphael (1991). "A growth path for a post-apartheid South Africa". Transformation: Critical Perspectives on Southern Africa. 16: 49–55. Pdf.
- Kaplinsky, Raphael; Kaplan, David; Joffe, Avril; Lewis, David (January 1994). "An industrial strategy for a post-apartheid South Africa". IDS Bulletin. 25 (1): 17–23. doi:10.1111/j.1759-5436.1994.mp25001004.x.
- Kaplinsky, Raphael (March 1994). "From mass production to flexible specialization: a case study of microeconomic change in a semi-industrialized economy". World Development. 22 (3): 337–353. doi:10.1016/0305-750X(94)90126-0.
- Kaplinsky, Raphael (January 2006). "Introduction". IDS Bulletin. 37 (1): 1–2. doi:10.1111/j.1759-5436.2006.tb00241.x.
- Kaplinsky, Raphael; Evans, David; Robinson, Sherman (January 2006). "Deep and shallow integration in Asia: towards a holistic account". IDS Bulletin. 37 (1): 12–22. doi:10.1111/j.1759-5436.2006.tb00243.x.
- Kaplinsky, Raphael (January 2006). "China and the global terms of trade". IDS Bulletin. 37 (1): 43–53. doi:10.1111/j.1759-5436.2006.tb00246.x.
- Kaplinsky, Raphael (June 2006). "Revisiting the revisited terms of trade: will China make a difference?". World Development. 34 (6): 981–995. doi:10.1016/j.worlddev.2005.11.011.
- Kaplinsky, Raphael; Santos-Paulino, Amelia U. (July 2006). "A disaggregated analysis of EU imports: the implications for the study of patterns of trade and technology". Cambridge Journal of Economics. 30 (4): 587–611. doi:10.1093/cje/bei098. JSTOR 23601880.
- Kaplinsky, Raphael (2007). "The impact of the Asian drivers on innovation and development strategies: lesson from Sub-Saharan Africa experience". International Journal of Technological Learning, Innovation and Development. 1 (1): 65–82. doi:10.1504/IJTLID.2007.015019.
- Kaplinsky, Raphael; Morris, Mike (2008). "Value chain analysis: a tool for enhancing export supply policies" (PDF). International Journal of Technological Learning, Innovation and Development. 1 (3): 283–308. doi:10.1504/IJTLID.2008.019975.
- Kaplinsky, Raphael; Morris, Mike (2008). "L'impatto della Cina sull'Africa sub-sahariana visto attraverso la lente del commercio" [The impact of China on sub-Saharan Africa, as seen through the trade lens]. Afriche e Orienti. 2: 35–48.
- Kaplinsky, Raphael (January 2008). "Globalisation, inequality and climate change: what difference does China make?" (PDF). Geography Compass. 2 (1): 67–78. Bibcode:2008GComp...2...67K. doi:10.1111/j.1749-8198.2007.00072.x. Pdf.
- Kaplinsky, Raphael; Messner, Dirk (February 2008). "Introduction: the impact of Asian drivers on the developing world" (PDF). World Development. 36 (2): 197–209. doi:10.1016/j.worlddev.2007.06.006. S2CID 11009710. Pdf.
- Kaplinsky, Raphael; Morris, Mike (February 2008). "Do the Asian drivers undermine the export-oriented industrialisation in SSA?". World Development. 36 (2): 254–273. doi:10.1016/j.worlddev.2007.06.007. hdl:11427/19479. Pdf.
- Kaplinsky, Raphael (March 2008). "What does the rise of China do for industrialisation in sub-Saharan Africa?" (PDF). Review of African Political Economy. 35 (115): 7–22. doi:10.1080/03056240802011360. JSTOR 20406474. S2CID 52839879. Pdf.
- Kaplinsky, Raphael (guest editor); Ajakaiye, Olusanya (guest editor) (September 2009). "China in Africa: a relationship in transition". The European Journal of Development Research. 21 (4): 479–676. doi:10.1057/ejdr.2009.30.
- Kaplinsky, Raphael; Ajakaiye, Olusanya (September 2009). "China in Africa: a relationship in transition". The European Journal of Development Research. 21 (4): 479–484. doi:10.1057/ejdr.2009.30.
- Kaplinsky, Raphael; Morris, Mike (September 2009). "Chinese FDI in sub-Saharan Africa: engaging with large dragons" (PDF). The European Journal of Development Research. 21 (4): 551–569. doi:10.1057/ejdr.2009.24. S2CID 10099653. Pdf.
- Kaplinsky, Raphael; Morris, Mike (November 2009). "The Asian drivers and SSA: is there a future for export-orientated African industrialisation?". The World Economy. 32 (11): 1638–1655. doi:10.1111/j.1467-9701.2009.01253.x. hdl:11427/19822. S2CID 154650087. Pdf.
- Kaplinsky, Raphael; Chataway, Joanna; Clark, Nomran; Hanlin, Rebecca; Dinar, Kale; Muraguri, Lois; Papaioannou, Theo; Robbins, P.; Wamae, Watu (December 2009). "Below the radar: what does innovation in emerging economies have to offer other low-income economies?" (PDF). International Journal of Technology Management and Sustainable Development. 8 (3): 177–197. doi:10.1386/ijtm.8.3.177/1. Economic and Social Research Council version, pdf.
- Kaplinsky, Raphael; Farooki, Masuma (2011). "What are the implications for global value chains when the market shifts from the north to the south?". International Journal of Technological Learning, Innovation and Development. 1 (1/2/3): 13–38. doi:10.1504/IJTLID.2011.041898. World Bank pdf.
- Kaplinsky, Raphael (March 2011). "Schumacher meets Schumpeter: appropriate technology below the radar". Research Policy. 40 (2): 193–203. doi:10.1016/j.respol.2010.10.003. Open University version, pdf.
- Kaplinsky, Raphael; Terheggen, Anne; Tijaja, Julia (July 2011). "China as a final market: the Gabon timber and Thai cassava value chains". World Development, Special Section: Foreign Technology and Indigenous Innovation in the Emerging Economies. 39 (7): 1177–1190. doi:10.1016/j.worlddev.2010.12.007.
- Kaplinsky, Raphael; Fu, Xiaolan; Zhang, Jing (August 2012). "The impact of China on low and middle income countries' export prices in industrial-country markets". World Development. 40 (8): 1483–1496. doi:10.1016/j.worlddev.2012.04.001.
- Kaplinsky, Raphael; Kaplan, David; Morris, Mike (December 2012). ""One thing leads to another" — commodities, linkages and industrial development". Resources Policy. 37 (4): 408–416. Bibcode:2012RePol..37..408M. doi:10.1016/j.resourpol.2012.06.008.
- Kaplinsky, R. (2013), "What Contribution Can China Make to Inclusive Growth in Sub-Sahara Development and Growth?", Development and Change, 46(6), pp. 1–22.
- Kaplinsky, Raphael; Chataway, Jo; Hanlin, Rebecca (January 2014). "Inclusive innovation: an architecture for policy development". Innovation and Development. 4 (1): 33–54. doi:10.1080/2157930X.2013.876800. S2CID 153479164. PDF.
- Kaplinsky, R. and M. Morris (2015), "Thinning and Thickening: Productive Sector Policies in the Era of Global Value Chains", European Journal of Development Studies, pp. 1–21, doi:10.1057/ejdr.2015.29
- Hanlin, R. and R. Kaplinsky (2016), "South–South Trade in Capital Goods – The Market-Driven Diffusion of Appropriate Technology", European Journal of Development Research, pp. 1–18, doi:10.1057/ejdr.2016.18
- Kaplinsky, Raphael and M. Morris (2018), "Standards, regulation and sustainable development in a global value chain driven world", International Journal of Technological Learning, Innovation and Development, vol. 10, no. 3/4, pp. 322–346.
- Davis, D., R. Kaplinsky and M. Morris (2018), "Rents, Power and Governance in Global Value Chains", Journal of World-Systems Research, 2018, vol. 24, no. 1.

=== Papers ===
- International Labour Office (ILO), United Nations, Geneva, Switzerland
  - Kaplinsky, Raphael; Cooper, Charles (1974). Second-hand equipment in a developing country: a study of jute-processing in Kenya. Geneva, Switzerland: International Labour Office. ISBN 978-92-2-101191-0.
  - Kaplinsky, Raphael (1979). Employment effects of multinational enterprises: a case study of Kenya. Multinational Enterprises Programme, working paper no. 8. Geneva, Switzerland: International Labour Office. ISBN 978-92-2-102272-5. Pdf.
  - Kaplinsky, Raphael (1987). Micro-electronics and employment revisited: a review. Geneva, Switzerland: International Labour Office. ISBN 978-92-2-105610-2.
- Institute of Development Studies (IDS), University of Sussex
  - Kaplinsky, Raphael (1991). From mass production to flexible specialisation: a case-study from a semi-industrialised economy. Brighton, England: Institute of Development Studies, University of Sussex. ISBN 978-0-903715-49-2. dp295.
  - Kaplinsky, Raphael (1994). South African industrial performance and structure in a comparative context. Brighton, England: Institute of Development Studies, University of Sussex. ISBN 978-1-85864-031-0.
  - Kaplinsky, Raphael (1998). Globalisation, industrialisation and sustainable growth: the pursuit of the nth rent. Brighton, England: Institute of Development Studies, University of Sussex. ISBN 978-1-85864-225-3. dp365. Pdf.
  - Kaplinsky, Raphael (2000). Spreading the gains from globalisation: what can be learned from chain analysis. Brighton, England: Institute of Development Studies, University of Sussex. ISBN 978-1-85864-301-4. wp110. Pdf.
  - Kaplinsky, Raphael; Morris, Mike (2001). A handbook for value chain research. Brighton, England: Institute of Development Studies, University of Sussex. OCLC 156818293. Archived from the original on 11 April 2021. Pdf.
  - Kaplinsky, Raphael; Morris, Mike (January 2006). Dangling by a thread: how sharp are the Chinese scissors?. Brighton, England: Institute of Development Studies, University of Sussex for the Department for International Development (DfID). OCLC 692413406. Pdf.
  - Kaplinsky, Raphael; McCormick, Dorothy; Morris, Mike (April 2006). The impact of China on Sub Saharan Africa. Brighton, England: Institute of Development Studies, University of Sussex for the Department for International Development (DfID). wp6. Pdf.
  - Kaplinsky, Raphael; McCormick, Dorothy; Morris, Mike (November 2007). The impact of China on Sub Saharan Africa. Brighton, England: Institute of Development Studies, University of Sussex for the Department for International Development (DfID). OCLC 190375472. wp291.
- United Nations Industrial Development Organization (UNIDO), Vienna, Austria
  - Kaplinsky, Raphael; Memedovic, Olga; Morris, Mike; Readman, Jeff (2003). The global wood furniture value chain: what prospects for upgrading by developing countries? The case of South Africa. Sectoral Studies Series. Vienna, Austria: United Nations Industrial Development Organization (UNIDO). OCLC 692414273. SSRN 420080. Pdf.
  - Kaplinsky, Raphael; Memedovic, Olga; Readman, Jeff (2009). Upgrading strategies in global furniture value chains. Vienna, Austria: United Nations Industrial Development Organization (UNIDO). OCLC 680056888. wp 09/2008. Pdf.
  - Kaplinsky, Raphael; Farooki, Masuma (2012). Promoting industrial diversification in resource intensive economies: the experiences of sub-Saharan Africa and central Asia regions. Vienna, Austria: United Nations Industrial Development Organization (UNIDO). OCLC 819572290.
  - The Intellectual History of UNIDO: Building Ideas from Data and Practice. Vienna, Austria: United Nations Industrial Development Organization (UNIDO).
  - Kaplinsky, Raphael and Morris, Mike (2014). Developing Industrial Clusters and Supply Chains to Support Diversification and Sustainable Development of Exports in Africa, Cairo: African Export Import Bank.
  - Kaplinsky, Raphael (2015), "Technological Upgrading in Global Value Chains and Clusters and their Contribution to Sustaining Economic Growth in Low and Middle Income Economies". Inclusive and Sustainable Industrial Development Working Paper Series, WP 03/2015. Vienna: United Nations Industrial Development Organization.
  - Kaplinsky, Raphael (2015), "Technological upgrading in global value chains and clusters and their contribution to sustaining economic growth in low and middle income economies". UNIDO/UNU‐MERIT background papers for the UNIDO, Industrial Development Report 2016: IDR 2016 WP 3.
  - Greening Africa's Industrialization: Economic Report on Africa, 2016, United Nations Economic Commission for Africa.
- Open University
  - Kaplinsky, Raphael; Morris, Mike; Kaplan, David (October 2011). "One thing leads to another" – commodities, linkages and industrial development: a conceptual overview. Making the Most of Commodities Programme (MMCP). Milton Keynes, UK: The Open University. OCLC 809869764. MMCP Discussion Paper No. 12. Pdf.
  - Kaplinsky, Raphael; Morris, Adam; Kaplan, David (October 2011). Commodities and linkages: industrialisation in sub-Saharan Africa. Making the Most of Commodities Programme (MMCP). Milton Keynes, UK: The Open University. OCLC 809869715. MMCP Discussion Paper No. 13. Pdf.
  - Kaplinsky, Raphael; Morris, Adam; Kaplan, David (October 2011). Commodities and linkages: meeting the policy challenge. Making the Most of Commodities Programme (MMCP). Milton Keynes, UK: The Open University. OCLC 809869746. MMCP Discussion Paper No. 14. Pdf.
  - Kaplinsky, Raphael; Morris, Mike; Kaplan, David (November 2011). A conceptual overview to understand commodities, linkages and industrial development in Africa. Milton Keynes, UK: The Open University. OCLC 809870245. Pdf.
    - See also Kaplinsky, Raphael; et al. "Discussion papers". Making the Most of Commodities Programme (MMCP), The Open University.
    - See also Kaplinsky, Raphael; et al. (December 2012). ""One thing leads to another"—Commodities, linkages and industrial development". Resources Policy. 37 (4): 408–483. Bibcode:2012RePol..37..408M. doi:10.1016/j.resourpol.2012.06.008. (Based on the MMCP research papers.)
    - Chataway, J., R. E. Hanlin and R. Kaplinsky (2013), "Inclusive Development: An Architecture for Policy Development", IKD Working Paper 65, Milton Keynes: The Open University.
    - Kaplinsky, Raphael and Morris, Mike (2014), "Thinning and Thickening: Productive Sector Policies in the Era of Global Value Chains", IKD Discussion Paper No. 74, Milton Keynes, Open University
- World Bank
  - Kaplinsky, Raphael; Terheggen, Anne; Tijaja, Julia; Farooki, Masuma (January 2010). What happens in global value chains when the market shifts from the north to the south?. Washington, D.C.: World Bank. OCLC 868034623. Pdf.
  - Kaplinsky, Raphael (June 2010). The role of standards in global value chains and their impact on economic and social upgrading. Washington, D.C.: World Bank. OCLC 868034560. Pdf.
  - Kaplinsky, Raphael; Farooki, Masuma (February 2010). What are the implications for global value chains when the market shifts from the north to the south?. Washington, D.C.: World Bank. OCLC 778847192. wp5205. Pdf.
  - Kaplinsky, Raphael; Terheggen, Anne; Tijaja, Julia (February 2010). What happens when the market shifts to China? The Gabon timber and Thai cassava value chains. Washington, D.C.: World Bank. OCLC 778847196. wp5206. Pdf.
- Sanjaya Lall Programme for Technology and Management for Development (SLPTMD), Department of International Development, University of Oxford
- Kaplinsky, Raphael; Fu, Xiaolan; Zhang, Jing. The impact of China's exports on global manufactures prices. Sanjaya Lall Programme for Technology and Management for Development (SLPTMD), Department of International Development, University of Oxford. OCLC 837645506. SLPTMD wp032. Pdf.
- Kaplinsky, Raphael, and Morris, Mike (2001) A Handbook for Value Chain Research. http://www.prism.uct.ac.za/papers/vchnov01.pdf
- Morris, M., R. Kaplinsky and D. Kaplan (2011), A Conceptual Overview to Understand Commodities, Linkages and Industrial Development in Africa, Prepared for Africa Export Import Bank.
- Kaplinsky, Raphael (2012), "Walking (stumbling?) On two legs: meeting SSA's industrialisation challenge", Paper presented to International Economic Association Conference on Industrialisation in Africa, July 2012, Pretoria.
- Kaplinsky, Raphael (2012), "China's impact on commodity prices", ThisisAfricaOnline.com,http://www.thisisafricaonline.com/News/China-s-impact-on-commodity-prices
- Adeoti, J., R. Kemp, J. Ndichu, A. E. Obayelu, J. Blohmke, R. Kaplinsky and K. Urama (2013), "Diffusion strategy of green technology and green industry in Africa. A study of renewable energy technology market, and energy efficiency adoption in Cassava and Maize processing industries in Kenya and Nigeria", Final report of study for KEEI and UNIDO, Maastricht: United Nations University.
- Kaplinsky. Raphael (2013), Infrastructure Development within the Context of Africa's Cooperation with New And Emerging Development Partners, Report Prepared For The United Nations Office Of The Special Adviser On Africa, N. York: Office for the Special Adviser on Africa, United Nations.
- Kaplinsky, Raphael, and Morris, Mike. (2014). Developing Industrial Clusters and Supply Chains to Support Diversification and Sustainable Development of Exports in Africa. Cairo: African Export Import Bank.
- Kemp^{,} R., J. A. Adeoti, J. Ndichu, A. E. Obayelu, J. Blohmke, R. Kaplinsky and K. Urama (2014), "Innovation policy for eco-innovation in developing countries in Africa", Paper presented to Lundvall symposium "Innovation policy – can it make a difference?", Utzon Center, Aalborg, Denmark,13‐14 March.
- Kaplinsky, Raphael (2016), "The End of Industrial Policy? Why a Productive Sector Policy Agenda Better Meets the Needs of Sustainable Income Growth", Commonwealth Secretariat Policy Briefing Paper.
- Kaplinsky, Raphael (2016), Inclusive and Sustainable Growth: The SDG Value Chains Nexus, Framework Paper, International Centre for Trade and Sustainable Development, Geneva.
- Kaplinsky, Raphael (2018), Fostering inclusive innovation for sustainable development,Pathways for Prosperity Commission Background Paper Series; no. 9. Oxford: United Kingdom, https://pathwayscommission.bsg.ox.ac.uk/Raphael-Kaplinsky-paper
