= World Development (journal) =

- Discipline: Development studies, economic development
- Language: English
- Edited by: Jampel Dell'Angelo, Angelika Rettberg

Publication details
- History: 1973-present
- Publisher: Elsevier
- Frequency: Monthly
- Impact factor: 6.9 (2022)

Standard abbreviations
- ISO 4: World Dev.

Indexing
- CODEN: WODEDW
- ISSN: 0305-750X (print); 1873-5991 (web)
- LCCN: 73645248
- OCLC no.: 535314332

Links
- Journal homepage; Online access

World Development is a monthly peer-reviewed academic journal covering development studies. It was established in 1973 and is published by Elsevier.

According to the Journal Citation Reports, the journal has a 2022 impact factor of 6.9.
