= Rufus Learsi =

American-Jewish educator, author and journalist

Israel Goldberg (1887 – August 1964), better known by the pen-name Rufus Learsi, was an American-Jewish educator, author and journalist.

== Life ==
Learsi was born near Białystok in Poland, and emigrated to the US with his parents as a child. His education was in the New York public school system and his degree from City College in 1909. He taught history and foreign languages in high schools, later turning to writing.

He wrote extensively on Jewish history, and was founder and editor of World Over, also editing the Zionist Quarterly and the Jewish Forum.

He was active with the Jewish Education Association and the Jewish Education Committee.

He wrote, in his role as chairman of the Seder Ritual Committee, the Seder Ritual of Remembrance "for the six million Jews who perished at the hands of the Nazis and the heroes of the Warsaw uprising", which was widely published as part of the Seder in the US in the late 1950s and the early 1960s, though it was never part of any haggadah.

== Works ==
- Plays for Great Occasions (1914)
- Kasriel the Watchman & Other Stories (1925)
- Israel; A History of the Jewish People
- The Jews in America: A History (1954)
- Outline of Jewish Knowledge (three volumes) (with Samson Benderley)
- The Wedding Song, a Book of Chasidic Ballads (1938)
- Shimmele (1940)
- Shimmele and His Friends (1940)
- Fulfilment, the Epic Story of Zionism (1951)
