= Ewa Kracowska =

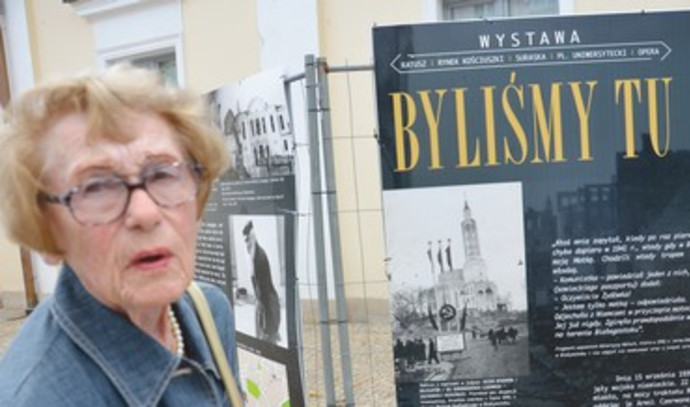
Ewa pictured in Bialystok's main square. background is an exhibition commemorating the annihilation of the Bialystok Jewish Community

Ewa Kracowska (December 18, 1924 – Feb 4, 2018) was a Jewish holocaust survivor from Białystok, Poland, who fought in the Białystok Ghetto uprising during World War II.

== Biography ==
Kracowska was born on December 18, 1924, in Białystok, Poland, a descendant of generations of Bialystokers Kracowska's father, Dr. Samuel Kracowsky, was a well known doctor in Bialystok, who also served in the Polish army in the Polish-Soviet War. Her parents married in 1923, and her brother Julek, (Yoel) was born on 1930.

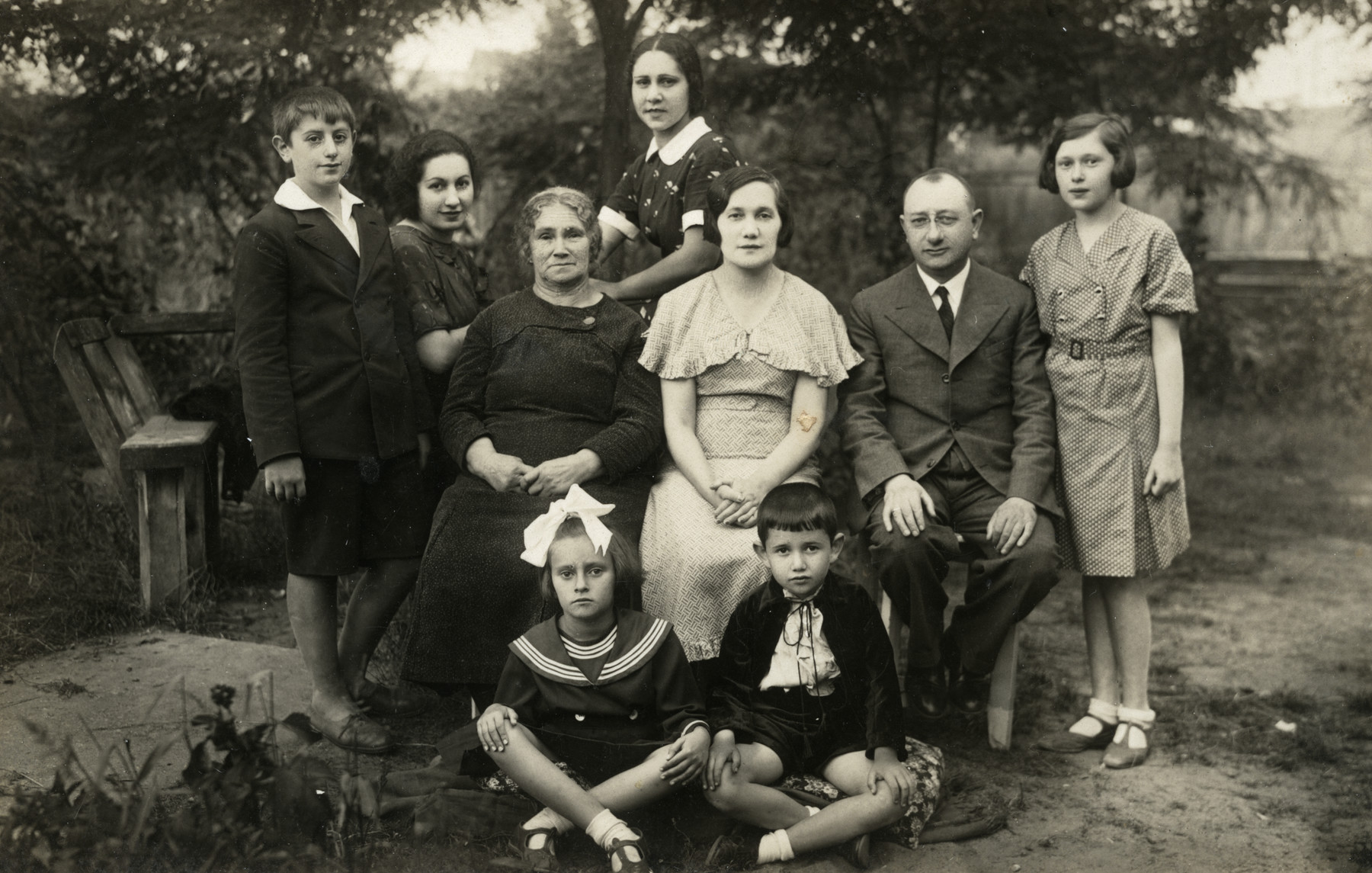
Ewa Kracowska's parents, Esther and Dr. Samuel Kracowski, are seated in the middle; Ewa is standing on the far right; and her brother Julek is seated in front, on the right. Berl Rabinovitch is standing on the far left.

Kracowska was 16 when Nazi troops invaded Bialystok on June 27, 1941. Kracowska's father, along with some 2000 other Jews, was murdered and burned in the city's synagogue immediately after the invasion.

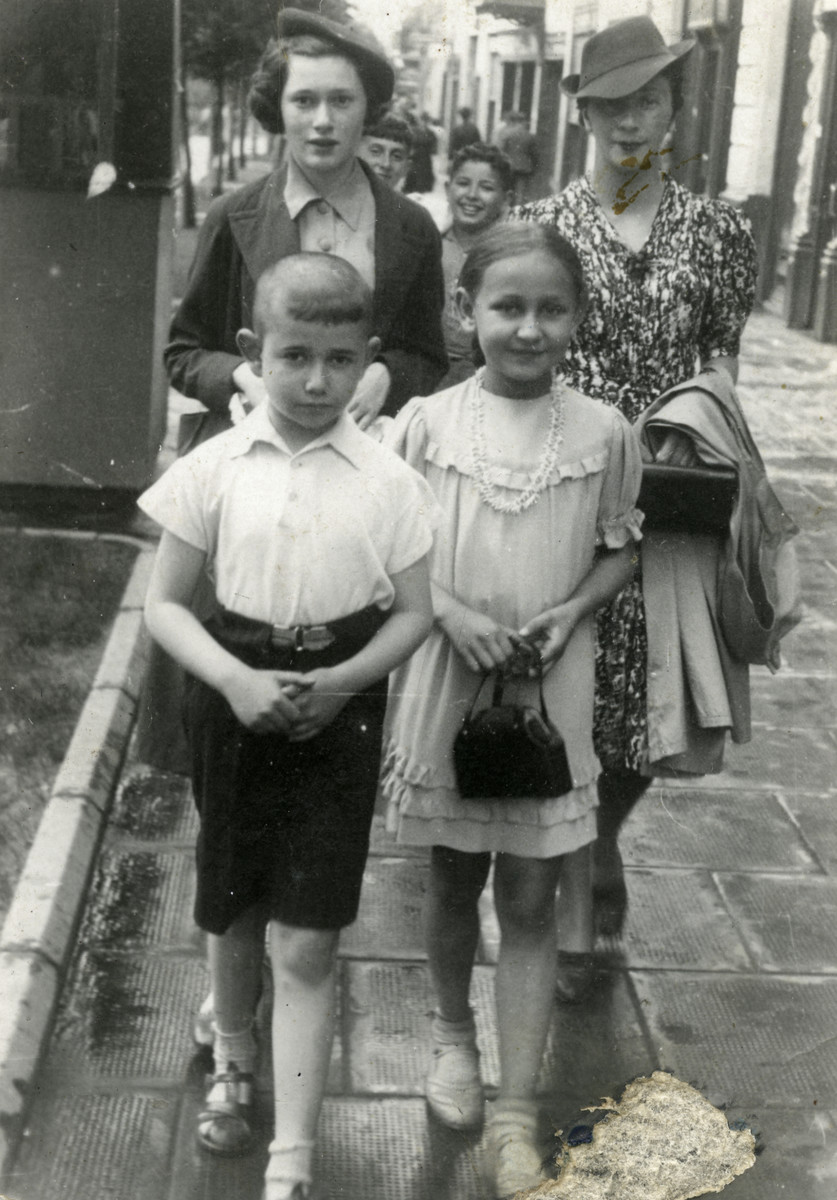
Ewa Kracowska and family walk down a street in Bialystok

On August 1, the Germans established a ghetto in the city.

"Ewa, her mother, and brother received a room in the ghetto clinic. Ewa's mother worked in the hospital. Ewa, who was fifteen, worked in a textile factory making uniforms for the Wehrmacht. During the next year and a half, the Germans continued to murder and deport Bialystok's Jews. Ewa wanted to join the nascent ghetto underground but initially was rejected since she previously had not belonged to either the Shomer Hatzair or the Communist youth movement. However, the Communists eventually accepted her since they wanted the use of her room which was near the fence of the ghetto. Those wanting to cross to the Aryan side would wait in her room".[7]

When the Nazis started liquidation of the Bialystok Ghetto, Kracowska's mother and young brother were sent to the death camps. Kracowska stayed in the ghetto and participated in the Bialystok Ghetto uprising. which took place on Aug. 16, 1943, the final liquidation of the ghetto. As soon as the aktzia began, she reported to her preassigned spot on the ghetto fence on Smolna Street where homemade Molotov cocktails were already in place. “The plan was to die there and not go on the transport,” she said in an interview for Yad Vashem in 1997. “This I swore to myself. I knew Smolna Street would be my end.”

After the revolt, she went into hiding in an attic in a house at 9 Fabryczna Street. From there, she managed to escape to the Suprasl and Knyszyn forests, some 25 kilometers away, where she joined a Jewish partisan resistance group.

For her participation in Nazi resistance during the Bialystok Ghetto uprising and afterwards with the partisan resistance, Kracowska received an award- the Knight's Cross of the Order of Merit of the Republic of Poland from the President of the Republic of Poland Bronisław Komorowski "for outstanding services in bringing together the Polish and Jewish nations."

In 1945, when she entered the freed Bialystok with the Soviet Army as a partisan, she no longer had anything left there, her entire family was exterminated by the Nazis and her old home was taken. She slept in the garden outside what used to be her old home, until finally she left for Grodno.

She met her husband, Yossef Makovski, while fighting in the partisans. The couple married shortly after the war. Kracowska kept her maiden name so that a lost family member or childhood friend who survived the war could find her. For 70 years she believed that she was the sole survivor of her entire large Jewish family, until in 2013 she found out about living descendants from her aunt's side (her father's sister), Ida Kracowska, who married a non-Jew before the war and survived.

They met in August 2013, when Ewa visited Bialystok for the 70th anniversary of the Białystok Ghetto uprising and their families have been in close contact ever since.

Kracowska died at the age of 93, at her home in Ramat Gan, Israel. She was the last known survivor of the Bialystok ghetto
