= Sarah-Emanuela Gröber =

German politician (born 1986)

Member of the Berlin House of Representatives
- Incumbent
- Assumed office 29 October 2026

Personal details
- Born: 31 May 1986 (age 40)
- Party: Alternative for Germany (since 2015)

Sarah-Emanuela Gröber (née Leins; born 31 May 1986) is a German politician who was elected member of the Berlin House of Representatives in 2026. She previously worked as a social media manager. She has been a member of the Alternative for Germany since 2015.
