= Mafeje affair =

1968 anti-government protests by South African students

- Part of the Protests of 1968
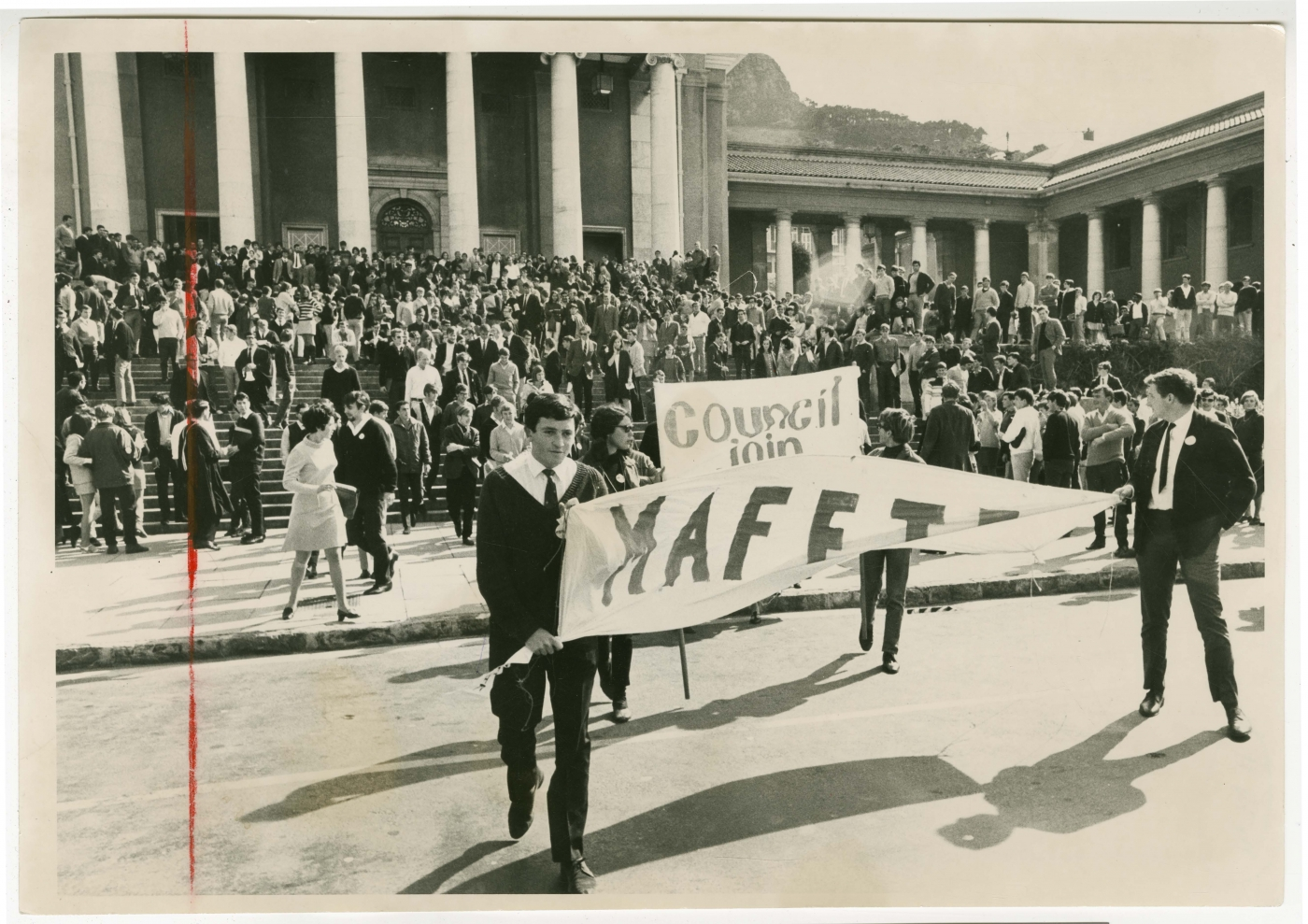
- UCT's students surrounding Jameson hall on 15 August 1968
- Date: 15–23 August 1968
- Location: University of Cape Town, City of Cape Town, Western Cape, South Africa
- Caused by: The government pressuring the University of Cape Town to rescind a black Lecturer’s, Archie Mafeje, job offer
- Goals: Academic freedom
- Methods: Non violent protest and sit-in
- Result: Quelling of protests

Parties
UCT's students UCT's staff Students at University of Natal and University of Witwatersrand	UCT's Council; South African apartheid government Afrikaner students at Stellenbosch University and Pretoria University; Local anti-protesters

Lead figures
Duncan Innes; Raphie Kaplinsky; Philip van der Merwe; Tony Shapiro	John Vorster; Jan de Klerk

Number
+600	

Casualties
- Arrested: see Arrests

The Mafeje affair refers to anti-government protests by South African students in 1968 in response to a decision of the council of the University of Cape Town (UCT) to rescind anthropologist Archie Mafeje's job offer for a senior lecturer position due to pressure from the South African apartheid government. The protests were followed by a nine-day sit-in at the university's administration building.

Protesters faced intimidation from the government, anti-protesters and fellow Afrikaans students from other universities. The police swiftly squashed support for the sit-in. Students at other universities, including the University of Natal and the University of Witwatersrand, voted in support of the UCT action. However, the government successfully intervened against a sympathy march at Witwatersrand.

Mafeje was never hired, and he left the country afterwards and did not return until 2000. After his death, UCT apologised to him and his family, and renamed the main room where the sit-in was held in his honour.

== Background ==
Archie Mafeje (1936–2007) enrolled at the University of Cape Town (UCT) in 1957, joining a minority of less than twenty non-white students on a campus of five thousand. At UCT, he initially enrolled for a Bachelor of Science (BSc) in biology, but failed to pass the required courses. He then switched to social anthropology in 1959. In 1960, he completed a Bachelor of Arts in urban sociology with honours, followed by a Master of Arts (MA) with distinction in political anthropology, before leaving the university in 1963.

Mafeje then moved to the UK initially as a research assistant at the University of Cambridge after being recommended by Monica Wilson (his MA supervisor), but then completed a Doctor of Philosophy under Audrey Richards at King's College, University of Cambridge, in the late 1960s.

Mafeje sought to return to UCT and applied for a senior lecturer post that UCT widely advertised in August 1967. He was unanimously offered a post as senior lecturer of social anthropology by the UCT Council. By law, the UCT could only admit white students unless suitable courses were not available at black universities, but the law did not explicitly bar UCT from hiring non-white faculty.

== UCT rescinds Mafeje's offer ==
Mafeje was scheduled to start on 1 July 1968, but the UCT Council decided to withdraw Mafeje's employment offer because the Government threatened to cut funding and impose sanctions on UCT should it appoint him. The Minister of National Education, Senator Jan de Klerk, told UCT Council about the

government's intense displeasure at the decision to appoint an African, which is tantamount to flouting the accepted traditional outlook of South Africa. Should your Council disregard my appeal and give effect to this decision, the government will not hesitate in taking such action as it may deem fit to ensure that the tradition referred to above is observed.

Being aware of the significant number of Jewish students at UCT, the South African government went to the extent of reminding these students that the government had recently loosened the laws to allow them to send money to Israel during the 1967 war, and threatened to reverse the law. Minister of Police and Internal Affairs Lourens Muller later appealed to the Jewish community "to respect authority and not disrupt it" and adding that freedom should not undermine the authority of the state.

== Students' backlash and sit-in ==
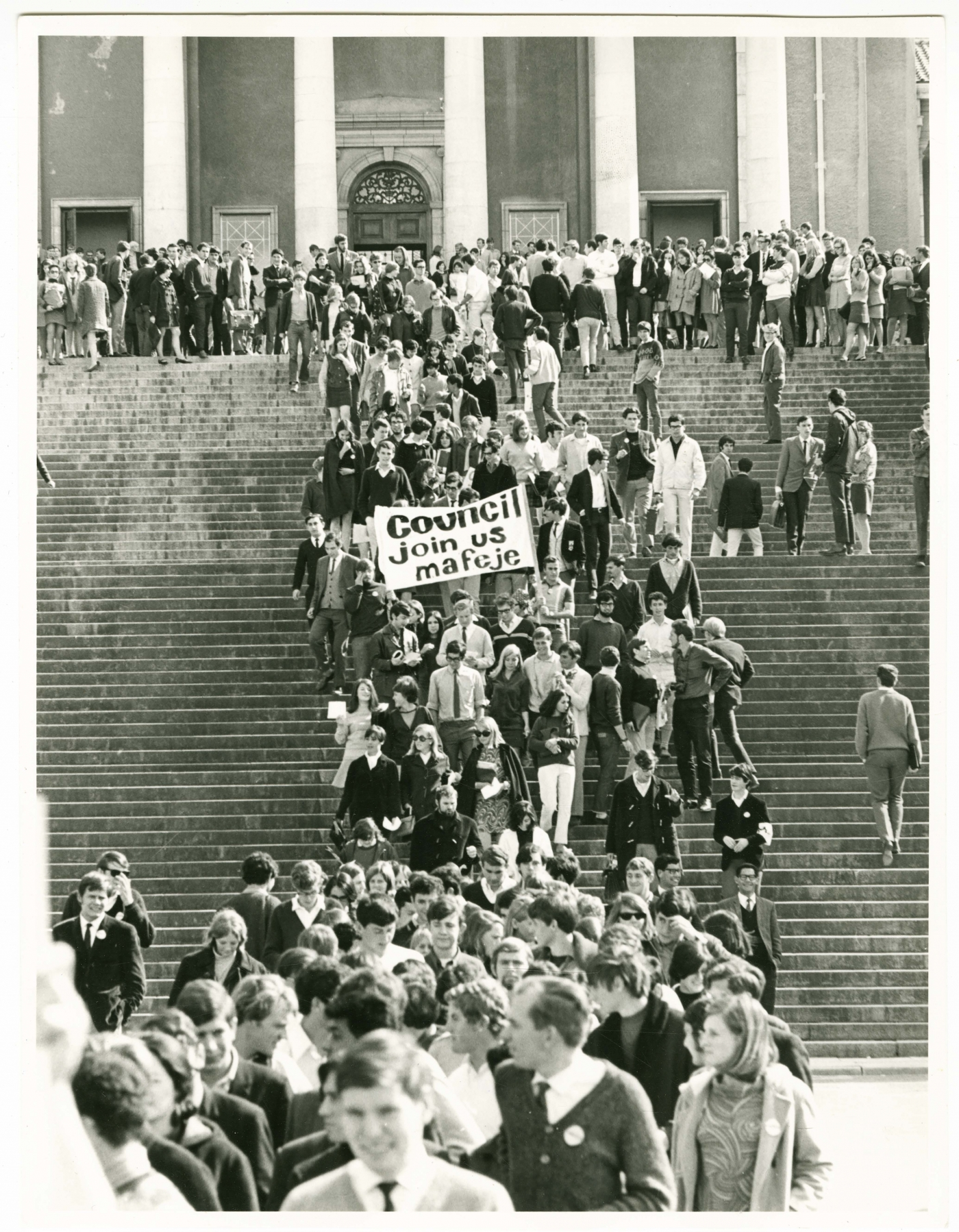
UCT's students descending to the Bremner Building after surrounding Jameson Hall (today's Sarah Baartman Hall)

The Council decision angered UCT's students and led to protests to pressure the council to reverse the decision. On 15 August 1968, Duncan Innes (National Union of South African Students, NUSAS, and Student Representative Council, SRC, president), Philip van der Merwe (SRC vice-president) and Raphie Kaplinsky (from Radical Society), among other students, organised a mass meeting that surrounded Jameson Hall (today's Sarah Baartman Hall) with over 1,000 students, before marching a long column from the campus to the university's administration building (Bremner Building) while chanting "We shall overcome" and holding banners and placards that read "Council foin us." They surrounded and occupied the Bremner Building for a sit-in in the UCT Council/Senate meeting room. The students demanded Mafeje be reinstated, declared 20 August Mafeje Day, and petitioned for measures to be put in place to protect academic freedom.

The sit-in forced the University Council's to call for an emergency meeting on the eight day of the sit in. However, the Council did not reverse its original decision. Prime Minister John Vorster attitude toward the sit-in was on display during his speech for the Nationalist Party meeting in Holborn where he warned universities to put their own houses in order otherwise he “will do it thoroughly". Vorster attacked NUSAS and University Christian Movement, and warned students that "the holiday is over."

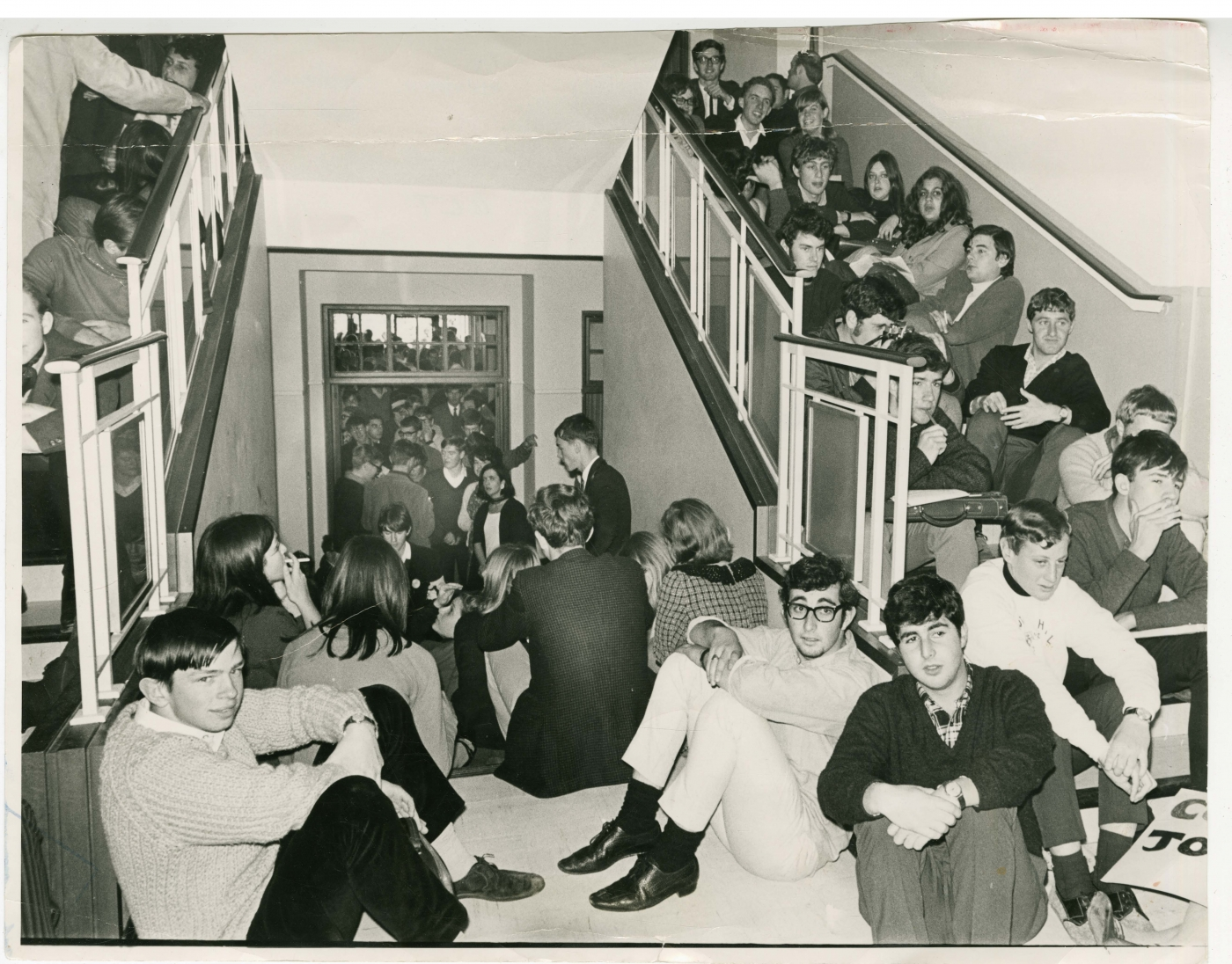
The students sit-in at the Bremner Building

=== Mafeje's reaction ===
In an interview in London, Mafeje said "the whole thing is so superficial, [as] the student [were] talking about this university autonomy business. But do they think they can have a free university in a society that is not free". He continued, "suppose I had been allowed to join the faculty of Cape Town University would they have protested against the fact that I would be forced to live off the campus? ... that I would have to have a permit to stay in Cape town? So long as I can sit with them for a few hours a day in the university canteen, many of them would call that academic freedom." However, Mafeje was surprised by the number of protesters.

While the sit-in was on its way, Mafeje applied to other jobs at universities in Tanzania, Zambia, and Uganda, stating that he "can't fight the Vorster regime".

=== Support and counter-protest ===
Sir Richard has heard our clarion call
And soon will be joining us at Bremner Hall,
He's leaving Sydney by an early flight
And we hope to see him by Friday night.
Chorus
Please, Sir Richard, don't be late,
We've sung folk songs till we can't see straight.
When it's hot we perspire, when it's cold we freeze,
soon we'll be contracting Kaplinsky's disease.
Dear Sir Richard, you are probably aware
We were frightened yesterday by a petrol-bomb scare,
But we feel pretty safe from such disasters
Since Vorster rounded up the pylon-blasters
Follow the example of Mr. Clive Corder
Who rushed straight here from across the border;

— Bremner Calypso, 28 August 1968

216 members of the staff and 10 professors at UCT supported the sit-in. Lectures from across UCT signed three petitions expressing support for the students action and called on the council to appoint Mafeje. 'Teach-in' was organised during the sit-in by staff supporting the students.A section of the building top-floor was repurposed for cooking meals using donations received from supporters. The student also received letters of support, one of which containing a composition entitled the "Bremner Calypso".

Support in South Africa came from Helen Suzman, founder of the Progressive Party, and University Christian Movement, and internationally from the Guardian and Newsweek. The sit-in gained international coverage and was considered part of the global protests of 1968. Students at other universities, including the University of Natal and the University of Witwatersrand, voted for full support of UCT student action and staged demonstrations in solidarity. However, on 19 August, Vorster successfully intervened against the University of Witwatersrand's sympathy march even after Johannesburg's City Council approval.

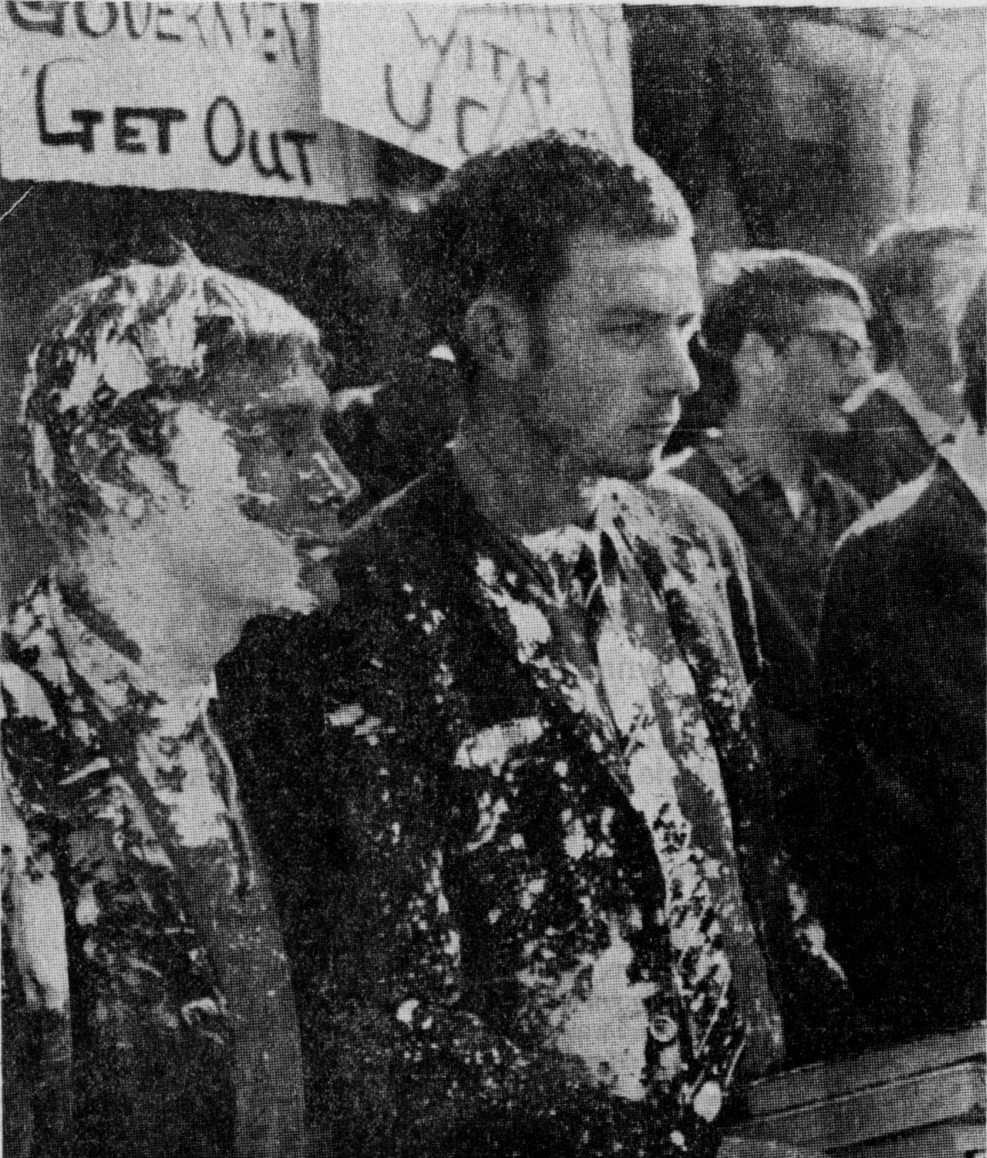
Paul Reuvers and Alant McKenzie were splashed with paint.

Following the cancellation of their planned march across Johannesburg, some 600 students demonstrated at the university's gate. Paul Reuvers and Alant McKenzie, two University of Witwatersrand students, were splashed with paint while participating in the picket demonstration in Jan Smuts Avenue, Johannesburg. Eggs, fruit, and paint were thrown at other University of Witwatersrand's students; two of them were detained. The next day Afrikaans students from Pretoria University forcibly shaved the heads of Witwatersrand students. Afrikaans students from the Goudstad College of Education and the Rand Afrikaans University were allowed to counter-protest.

Support protest gathered outside St. George's Cathedral, Cape Town; however, Sailors of the South African Navy disrupted the support protest and torn their posters.

The sit-in lasted for nine days, with participation from approximately 600 students, despite intimidation and counter-protests. These intimidations were in the form of smoke bombs, a false bomb threat, shots being fired at the doors, Afrikaans students from Stellenbosch University (fifty kilometres away) being sent to beat the students at the sit-in, and Prime Minister John Vorster calling the protest leaders and threatening them. Intimidation did not result in casualties but scared away potential supporters. Counter-protesters flattened the tyres of many student-owned cars, and the photos of some of the protesters were passed around to create targets for the counter-protesters.

=== End of the sit-in ===
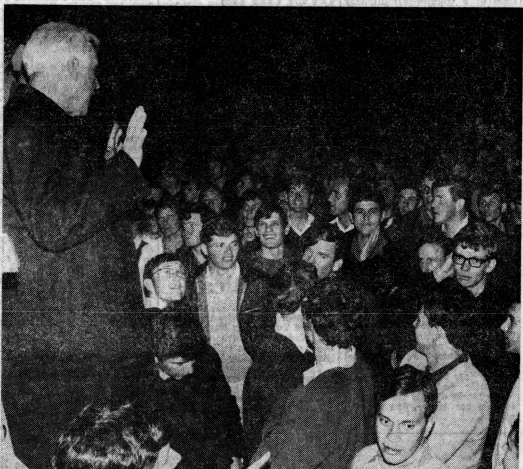
Inskip reasoning with the counter-protesters near UCT Bremner Building

On 22 August night, Police and security guards with dogs intervened when the counter-protester started throwing fruit, eggs and stones that knocked out one student and shattered the doors' glass. Later, a large crowd of counter-protesters, estimated at 1,000 including Maties, began to move towards the Bremner building main entrance. Donald Inskip, UCT Acting Principal of UCT, and G. E. McIntyre, Western Cape's divisional inspector, appealed (to no end) with the anti-protesters to disperse. The counter-protesters chanted "Kom uit Ikeys", Afrikaans for "come out Ikeys (students of UCT)", and pushed past security guards and gathered on the front door's steps. Professors, administrators, and security personnel formed a barricade in front of the doors and once more pleaded for calm.

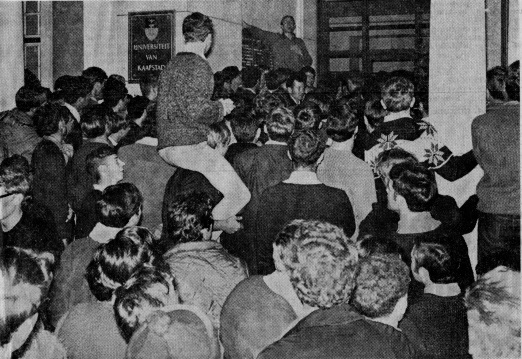
Counter-protestors outside the Bremner Building

The counter-protesters give the "sitters" a 30-minute ultimatum. Women student "sitters" were locked into one room within the Bremner Building for protection, and the Senate Chamber was sealed. One student managed to scale the balcony rail of the Senate Room and tear down a protest banner while the counter demonstrators were waiting for a half-hour. A student shouted, "Time's up," and the crowd moved ahead. Someone else yelled in Afrikaans, "Don't foul the good name of Stellenbosch!" One group yelled for support when discovered the rear entrance was damaged from two nights ago by another demonstrator. They started to tug and shake at the doors; however, the crowd started to disperse as police dog units arrived.

Then Colonel McIntyre, commanding a group of roughly 40 police officers, addressed the counter-protesters over a loudspeaker and ordered them to go. The crowd began to withdraw while shouting "bangbroeke" (Afrikaans for "scarepants") and "If you are not out tomorrow we'll come back and make a job of it".

Inskip told the students that many people had sacrificed not only their energy but might also have "sacrificed their lives" for the sitters. "It is your duty, therefore, to leave this building by tomorrow morning (Friday) at the very latest. If it had not been for the police, Stellenbosch students might have broken in." "The hard core who have proclaimed that they will not leave have placed the lives of all of you in danger to-night. Whether you felt afraid at their coming is not my concern, but we felt real fear on your behalf," he said.

The next day on 23 August, the protest's ninth day, the NUSAS called an end to the sit-in.

Following the end of the sit-in, Maurice Pope, head of the classic department for 12 years and former Dean of the Faculty of Humanities, resigned and left South Africa in protest.

== Aftermath ==
=== Apartheid government retaliation ===
The Security Police began acting against the student protest organisers under the Riotous Assemblies Act of 1956. Some were convicted by magistrates but later acquitted on appeal. Hans Joachim Brünger and Virginia Gass left the country after being questioned by the Security Police.

Passports were withdrawn from Duncan Innes (NUSAS president) and Raphie Kaplinsky, but they managed to flee the country. One executive member and the vice president of NUSAS were instructed to depart from South Africa before the end of 1968. Both were Rhodesians enrolled in universities in South Africa. (Note: In the past, students from Rhodesia were automatically permitted to remain in South Africa.) Police officers questioned the Rhodes University Student Union's president, who was later informed that his citizenship had been revoked. Rev. Basil Moore's, president of the University Christian Movement, passport was also withdrawn.

Prime Minister John Vorster warned that next time he would "send his boys," and introduced a legislation to allow racially-exclusive organisations to operate in the English-language universities.

=== Student reaction ===
Martin Plaut, BBC Africa Editor and one of the students to participate in the sit-in, said it was not a failure as it refuted the government's assertion that all white people backed its discriminatory policies and said that many of those who participated in the sit-in actively participated in later movements that led to the end of apartheid.

Students who participated in the sit-in later insisted that they had never met Mafeje and never sought to learn what had become of him. Lungisile Ntsebeza asserts that, in the eyes of the students, the Mafeje affair was not about Mafeje, the individual, but rather about academic freedom and the autonomy of universities.

Student elections on 31 August 1968 was dominated by leftist candidates, with what was described as a "conservative wipe-out". Philip van der Merwe (previous SRC vice-president and one of the sit-in leaders) was elected president.

On 28 August, more than 400 student at University of Fort Hare organised a sit-in before the administration building to protest the appointment of Johannes Christiaan de Wet as rector. The sit-in ended on the 30 of August.

=== UCT council response ===
UCT Council argued that they were "coerced" and "duressed" by the government, and complying with the government's request meant that they retained the theoretical right to hire non-white academics. However, until 1980, UCT did not appoint another black person. In Mafeje's honour, UCT created the Academic Freedom Research Award, which was not awarded to anyone, and erected a plaque acknowledging that the government had restricted the university's authority to choose its academics.

== Mafeje and UCT relationship afterwards ==
Shortly thereafter the protests, Mafeje left South Africa to pursue a career abroad. During the negotiations to end apartheid in the early 1990s, UCT offered Mafeje his 1968 senior lecturer position back on a one-year contract, but he declined the position as he was already a well-established professor. Mafeje said he found the offer "most demeaning". (Note: Mafeje wrote, "I fail to see how after 18 years of being a professor internationally I could be offered a research fellowship at the rank of senior lecturer at the University of Cape Town. This becomes even more incomprehensible when one recalls that one had been offered an appointment at the same rank by the same university as far back as 1968 ... After 27 years in exile I do not intend to return to South Africa under any conditions. Some of the senior staff at the University of Cape Town should have understood this".) In 1994, Mafeje applied for the A.C. Jordan Chair in African Studies at UCT, but his application was rejected as he was deemed "unsuitable for the position". Mahmood Mamdani, an Indian-born Ugandan professor, was appointed instead. He left after having disagreements with the administration on his draft syllabus of a foundation course on Africa called Problematizing Africa. This was dubbed the Mamdani affair.

== UCT apology ==
In 2002, UCT Vice-Chancellor Njabulo Ndebele re-opened the matter of the Mafeje affair. In 2003, UCT officially apologised to Mafeje and offered him an honorary doctorate, but he did not respond to UCT's offer. Mafeje died in 2007.

In 2008, on the incident's 40th anniversary, UCT formally apologised to Mafeje's family. In a citation, emeritus professor Francis Wilson wrote:

This then is the man, armed with a Cambridge PhD and a classic published urban study, whose appointment as a senior lecturer was rescinded by the university Council after pressure from the apartheid government in 1968. This is also the man for whom in the early 1990s we (and I include myself) at UCT all failed to provide the appropriate space to enable him to come home to teach and write as he so badly wanted to do.

— Francis Wilson, Archie Mafeje: never to be forgotten, UCT

Mafeje's family accepted the apology. UCT posthumously awarded him an honorary doctorate in Social Science, established a scholarship in his honour, and renamed the sit-in meeting room in the Bremner Building the Mafeje Room with a plaque honouring Mafeje, that now presides in front of the Senate meeting room that the protesters held throughout their action. UCT also established the Archie Mafeje Chair in Critical and Decolonial Humanities.

UCT alumni commemorated the 40th and 50th (golden) anniversary of the sit-in.
