= Abraham Kaplansky =

Canadian printer, lawyer, and communal worker

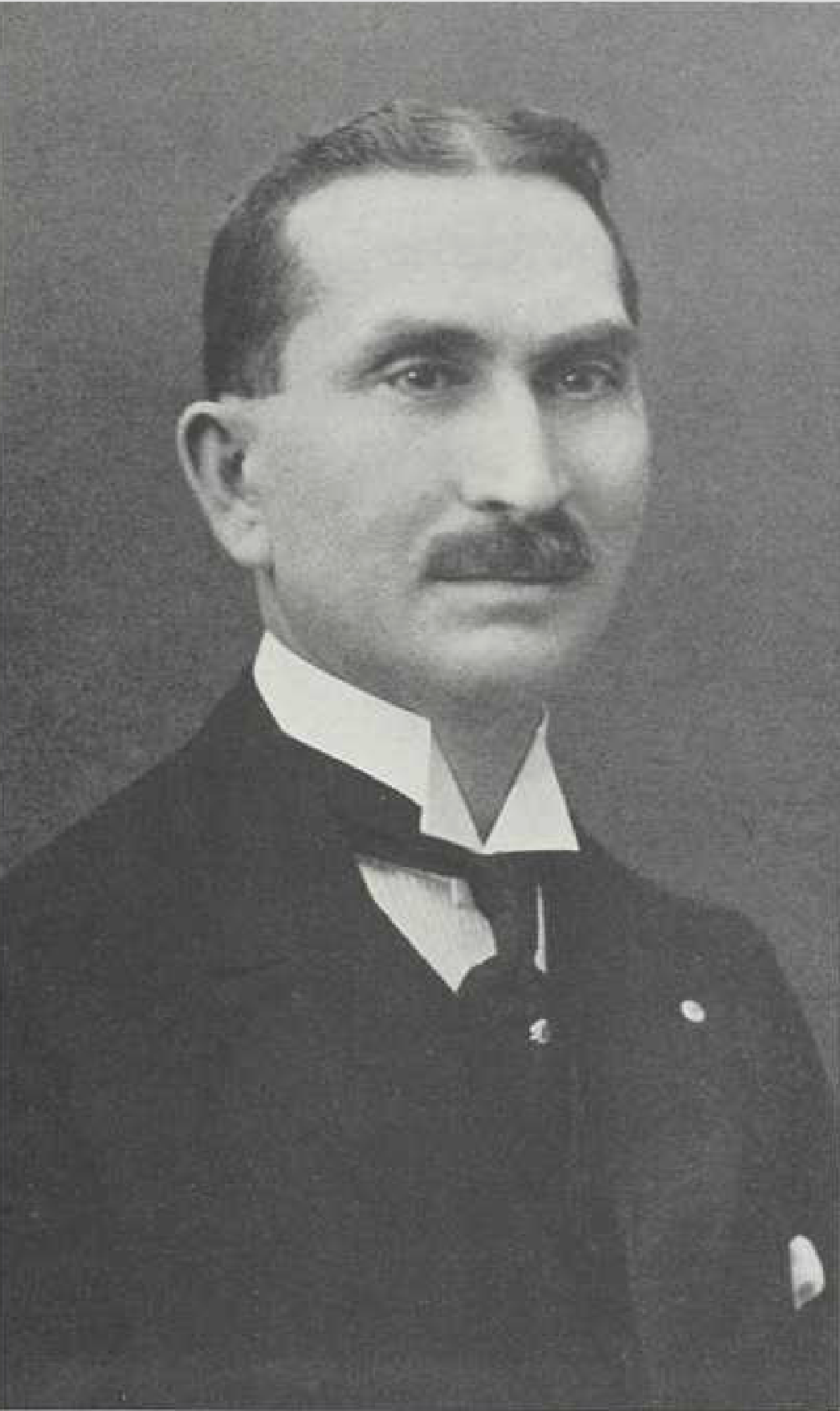
- Born: Avrom-Leyb Kaplansky; 1 May 1860; Białystok, Grodno Governorate, Russian Empire
- Died: 5 July 1939 (aged 79); Montreal, Quebec, Canada
- Burial place: Spanish and Portuguese Congregation Cemetery, Outremont
- Spouse: Elka Rabinovitch (m. 1891; died 1920)

Abraham Leon Kaplansky (Yiddish: אברהם־לייבּ קאַפלאַנסקי, romanized: Avrom-Leyb Kaplansky; 1 May 1860 – 5 July 1939) was a Canadian printer, lawyer, and communal worker, who established Canada's first Hebrew and Yiddish printing press.

== Biography ==
Kaplansky was born in Białystok, where he trained and worked as a printer. He immigrated to New York in 1889, where he entered the steamship ticket business, before moving to Montreal in 1893. There he established the first Hebrew and Yiddish printing press in Canada, using type imported from New York, which largely produced booklets, pamphlets, and other ephemera. Among Kaplansky's first publications were calendars for the Jewish years 5655 and 5656.

In 1906 he was made a justice of the peace for the District of Montreal, and the following year he took up the study of law. He was appointed head of the legal aid service of the Baron de Hirsch Institute in 1910. Kaplansky became the first clerk of the Montreal Jewish Court of Arbitration when it was founded in 1915 under the auspices of the institute.

Kaplansky was meanwhile active in a number charitable institutions and fraternal societies. He served as District Deputy Grand Master of the Independent Order of the Sons of Benjamin, as Treasurer of the Spanish and Portuguese Synagogue, and as president of the Chevra Kadisha congregation. He was also instrumental in establishing the Jewish Immigrant Aid Society of Canada.

On his death in July 1939, the Jewish Telegraphic Agency described Kaplansky as "one of the best known Jews in Canada".
