= Khayele Grober =

Khayele Grober (Yiddish: חיה׳לע גראָבער; Hebrew: חיה׳לה גרובר; also transliterated as Chayele; February 16, 1898 – December 10, 1978) was a Polish-Israeli theatre actor and playwright.

== Early life ==
She was born on February 16, 1898 into a Jewish family in Białystok, which was then a part of the Pale of Settlement of the Russian Empire. Her father was a successful merchant, and Khayele graduated from a Russian high school before receiving private tuition in Yiddish and Hebrew. She spent the First World War in Moscow, where she trained as an actor at the Habima studio.

== Career ==
After graduating from Habima, Khayele Grober's acting qualities quickly received the high praise of critics and audiences alike. In the words of the Yiddish lexikon: "She was one of the best known Yiddish actresses with her own distinctive style."

Her fame was not limited to the Yiddish cultural scene; in 1935 for instance she had several performances at one of the theatres in the Norwegian capital of Oslo, to great acclaim.

She was the author of several books and one stage play. One of her books was a memoir of her ten years at Habima in Moscow, parts of which were published in Yiddish magazines such as Di idishe tsaytung (The Jewish newspaper) in Buenos Aires, Keneder odler or Keneder Adler (Canadian eagle) in Montreal, and Di shtime (The voice) in Mexico.

After leaving the Soviet Union she eventually moved to Montreal, Canada in 1939, where she formed the Yidish Teater Group and introduced actors to the Stanislavski method.

Khayele Grober settled in Israel in 1966, and died in Haifa twelve years later on December 10, 1978.

== Literary works ==
- Tsu der groyser velt (To the great world) (Buenos Aires, 1952), 209 pp - a depiction of Jewish everyday life
- Af fridlekhe erd (On peaceful soil) - stage play
