= Adriana =

- Gender: Gender neutral (mostly female)
- Language: Latin

Origin
- Meaning: From Hadria

Other names
- Variant forms: Adrianne, Andriana

Adriana, also spelled Adrianna, is a Latin name and feminine form of Adrian. It originates from Italy and Spain.

== Translations ==
- Arabic: أدريان
- Belarusian: Адрыяна (Adryjana)
- Bulgarian: Адриана (Adriana)
- Chinese Simplified: 阿德里安娜 (Ādélǐānnà)
- Chinese Traditional: 阿德里安娜 (Ādélǐānnà)
- Greek: Αδριανή (Adriani)
- Gujarati: એડ્રીયાના (Ēḍrīyānā)
- Hebrew: אדריאנה
- Hindi: एड्रियाना (Ēḍriyānā)
- Indonesian: Adriana
- Japanese: エイドリアーナ (Eidoriāna)
- Kannada: ಆಡ್ರಿಯಾನಾ (Āḍriyānā)
- Korean: 아드리아나 (Adeuliana)
- Latvian: Adriāna (Adriaana)
- Persian: آدریانا
- Polish: Adrianna
- Russian: Адриана
- Serbian: Адријана (Adrijana)
- Tamil: அட்ரியானா (Aṭriyāṉā)
- Telugu: అడ్రియానా (Aḍriyānā)
- Ukrainian: Адріана
- Yiddish: אַדריאַנאַ

== Adriana ==
=== People ===
- Adriana of Nassau-Siegen (1449–1477), Dutch countess
- Adriana Abascal (born 1970), Mexican model
- Adriana Abenia (born 1984), Spanish television presenter, model, and actress
- Adriana Achcińska (born 2002), Polish footballer
- Adriana Acosta (born 1956, missing since 1978), Argentine militant and field hockey player
- Adriana Admiraal-Meijerink (1893–1992), Dutch fencer
- Adriana Aguirre (born 1951), Argentine actress and vedette
- Adriana Ailincăi (born 1999), Romanian rower
- Adriana Aizemberg (born 1938), Argentine film and television actress
- Adriana Albini (born 1955), Italian pathologist and cancer researcher
- Adriana Altaras (born 1960), German actress, theatre director, and writer
- Adriana Alves (sprinter) (born 1995), Angolan sprinter
- Adriana Ambesi (1940–2023), Italian actress
- Adriana Ampuero (born 1987), Chilean lawyer
- Adriana Angeles (born 1979), Mexican judoka
- Adriana Aparecida Costa (born 1983), Brazilian footballer
- Adriana Aparecida da Silva (born 1981), Brazilian long-distance runner
- Adriana Araújo (born 1981), Brazilian boxer
- Adriana Arboleda (born 1977/1978), Colombian model and presenter
- Adriana Arydes (born 1973), Brazilian singer and songwriter
- Adriana Asti (born 1933), Italian actress
- Adriana Barbu (born 1961), Romanian long-distance runner
- Adriana Barna (born 1978), German tennis player
- Adriana Barraza (born 1956), Mexican actress and director
- Adriana Barrientos (born 1980), Chilean model
- Adriana Barré (born 1995), Ecuadorian footballer
- Adriana Basarić (born 1982), Bosnia and Herzegovina tennis player
- Adriana Basile (1580–1640), Italian composer
- Adriana Bazon (born 1963), Romanian rower
- Adriana Behar (born 1969), Brazilian volleyball player
- Adriana Benetti (1919–2016), Italian actress
- Adriana Benitez (1975–2000), Colombian murder victim
- Adriana Bertini, Brazilian artist
- Adriana Betancur (born 1983), Colombian television presenter and model
- Adriana Biagiotti (born 1947), Italian gymnast
- Adriana Bianco (born 1941), known professionally as Adrianita, Argentine actress
- Adriana Birolli (born 1986), Brazilian actress
- Adriana Bisi Fabbri (1881–1918), Italian painter
- Adriana Bittel (born 1946), Romanian literary critic and writer
- Adriana Bogaard, Canadian film and theatrical set and costume designer
- Adriana Bombom, Brazilian dancer, model, television host, and actress
- Adriana Bortolozzi (born 1949), Argentine politician
- Adriana Breukink (1957–2022), Dutch recorder player and maker
- Adriana Briscoe, American evolutionary biologist
- Adriana Brodsky (born 1955), Argentine actress
- Adriana Budevska (1878–1955), Bulgarian actress
- Adriana Alvim Burke, aka Adriana (footballer, born 1968), American-Brazilian footballer
- Adriana Cabrera (born 1992), Puerto Rican handballer
- Adriana Cáceres (born 1982), Argentine political scientist and politician
- Adriana Calcanhotto (born 1965), Brazilian singer-songwriter
- Adriana Calderón (born 2003), Mexican climate activist
- Adriana Calvo (1947–2010), Argentine physicist, professor, and researcher
- Adriana Camelli (1928–1996), Argentine swimmer
- Adriana Campos (1979–2015), Colombian actress
- Adriana Cancino (born 1963), Chilean politician and teacher
- Adriana Carabalí, Colombian politician
- Adriana Cardoso de Castro (born 1990), Brazilian handballer
- Adriana Carmona (born 1972), Venezuelan taekwondo practitioner
- Adriana Caselotti (1916–1997), American actress and singer
- Adriana Castelán Macías (born 1983), Mexican politician
- Adriana Castillo (born 1990), Uruguayan footballer
- Adriana Castillo (archer) (born 2005), Mexican archer
- Adriana Cataño, American actress, businesswoman, and television host
- Adriana Cavarero (born 1947), Italian philosopher and feminist thinker
- Adriana Chechik (born 1991), American pornographic actress and internet personality
- Adriana Cerezo (born 2003), Spanish taekwondo athlete
- Adriana Chamajová (born 1971), Slovak basketball player
- Adriana Cisneros (born 1979), Venezuelan businesswoman
- Adriana Comolli (born 1951), Argentine swimmer
- Adriana Corona (born 1980), Mexican triathlete
- Adriana Corral (born 1983), American artist
- Adriana Crăciun (born 1989), Romanian handballer
- Adriana Crisci (born 1982), Italian gymnast
- Adriana Crispo (died after 1537), Greek ruler in the Cyclades
- Adriana Cristina Serquis (born 1967), Argentine physicist and researcher
- Adriana Dadci (born 1979), Polish judoka
- Adriana Dávila (born 1979), Peruvian footballer
- Adriana Dávila Fernández (born 1970), Mexican politician
- Adriana de Barros (born 1976), Portuguese-Canadian illustrator, web designer, and poet
- Adriana de Vecchi (1896–1995), Portuguese cellist and educator
- Adriana DeMeo (born 1981), American actress
- Adriana Degreas (born 1971), Brazilian fashion designer
- Adriana Delpiano (born 1947), Chilean politician
- Adriana Diaz (journalist) (born 1984), American television journalist
- Adriana Díaz (table tennis) (born 2000), Puerto Rican table tennis player
- Adriana Díaz Contreras (born 1970), Mexican politician
- Adriana Dorn (born 1986), Nicaraguan beauty pageant titleholder
- Adriana Dunavska (born 1969), Bulgarian gymnast
- Adriana Dutkiewicz, Australian sedimentologist
- Adriana Ehlers (1894–1972), Mexican filmmaker
- Adriana Espinosa (born 1991), Ecuadorian archer
- Adriana Esteves (born 1969), Brazilian actress
- Adriana Evans (born 1974), American R&B vocalist
- Adriana Falcão (born 1960), Brazilian screenwriter
- Adriana Faranda (born 1950), Italian terrorist
- Adriana Farmiga (born 1974), Ukrainian American artist
- Adriana Fernández (born 1971), Mexican long-distance runner
- Adriana Ferrarese del Bene (c. 1755–1804), Italian operatic soprano
- Adriana Flores (born 1991), Salvadoran footballer
- Adriana Fonseca (born 1979), Mexican actress
- Adriana Fuentes Cortés (born 1968), Mexican politician
- Adriana Fuentes Téllez (born 1960), Mexican politician
- Adriana Galvan, American psychologist
- Adriana Garambone (born 1970), Brazilian actress and model
- Adriana Garroni (born 1966), Italian mathematician
- Adriana Gascoigne, American technology executive and activist
- Adriana Gaviria, American actor, producer, director, writer, and advocate
- Adriana Gerši (born 1976), Czech tennis player
- Adriana Gil, Bolivian politician
- Adriana Giramonti (1929–2016), Italian-American chef
- Adriana Giuffrè (1939–2023), Italian actress
- Adriana Gjonaj, Albanian politician
- Adriana González Carrillo (born 1975), Mexican politician
- Adriana González-Peñas (born 1986), Spanish tennis player
- Adriana Guerrini (1907–1970), Italian operatic soprano
- Adriana Guzmán (born 1992), Mexican tennis player
- Adriana Hernández (born 2003), Mexican rhythmic gymnast
- Adriana Hernández Íñiguez (born 1978), Mexican politician
- Adriana Hinojosa Céspedes (born 1972), Mexican politician
- Adriana Hoffmann (1940–2022), Chilean botanist
- Adriána Holejová (born 1999), Slovak handballer
- Adriana Hölszky (born 1953), Romanian-German music educator, composer, and pianist
- Adriana Hunter, British translator
- Adriana Iliescu (born 1938), Romanian professor, philologist, and author
- Adriana Innocenti (1926–2016), Italian actress
- Adriana Iturbide (born 1993), Mexican footballer
- Adriana Ivancich (1930–1983), Italian noble woman and poet
- Adriana Janacópulos (1897– c. 1978), Brazilian sculptor
- Adriana Jelinkova (born 1992), Dutch alpine ski racer
- Adriana Jiménez (born 1985), Mexican high diver
- Adriana Johanna Bake (1724–1787), Dutch governor's wife in the East Indies
- Adriana Johanna Haanen (1814–1895), Dutch painter
- Adriana Johanna Taylor (born 1946), Dutch-born Australian politician
- Adriana Kaegi (born 1957), Swiss-American actress, producer, and singer
- Adriana Kaplan Marcusán (born 1956), Argentine anthropologist
- Adriana Konjarski (born 1995), Australian footballer
- Adriana Kostiw (born 1974), Brazilian sailor
- Adriana Krnáčová (born 1960), Czech businesswoman and politician
- Adriana Kugler, Colombian-American economist
- Adriana Kučerová (born 1976), Slovak operatic soprano
- Adriana LaGrange (born 1961/62), Canadian politician
- Adriana Lamar (1909–1946), Mexican actress
- Adriana Lastra (born 1979), Spanish politician
- Adriana Lavat (born 1974), Mexican actress and television host
- Adriana Leal da Silva, aka Adriana (footballer, born 1996), Brazilian footballer
- Adriana Leon (born 1992), Canadian soccer player
- Adriana Lessa (born 1971), Brazilian actress, singer, television presenter, and dancer
- Adriana Lestido (born 1955), Argentine photographer
- Adriana Lima (born 1981), Brazilian supermodel and former Victoria's Secret Angel
- Adriana Lisboa (born 1970), Brazilian writer
- Adriana Lita, American materials scientist
- Adriana Lleras-Muney, Colombian-American economist
- Adriana López Moreno (born 1978), Mexican politician
- Adriana Louvier (born 1983), Mexican actress and presenter
- Adriana Lovera (born 1985), Venezuelan road cyclist
- Adriana Maas (1702–1746), Dutch stage actress
- Adriana Maggs, Canadian actress, director, and writer
- Adriana Maldonado López, Spanish politician
- Adriana Maliponte (born 1938), Italian operatic soprano
- Adriana Marais (born 1983), South African theoretical physicist, technologist, and explorer
- Adriana Maraž (1931–2015), Slovene graphic artist
- Adriana Marmolejo (born 1982), Mexican swimmer
- Adriana Marmorek (born 1969), Colombian artist
- Adriana Martín (born 1986), Spanish footballer
- Adriana Martín (born 1996), Spanish archer
- Adriana Mather, American actress, novelist, and film producer
- Adriana Medveďová (born 1992), Slovak handballer
- Adriana Melo (born 1976), Brazilian comic book artist and penciler
- Adriana Millard (born 1926), Chilean sprinter
- Adriana Miller, American dancer
- Adriana Moisés Pinto (born 1978), Brazilian basketball player
- Adriana Molinari (born 1967), Argentine beauty pageant winner, model, exotic dancer, and actress
- Adriana Monsalve (born 1977), Venezuelan sportscaster and journalist
- Adriana Monti (born 1951), Italian-Canadian film director, producer, and screenwriter
- Adriana Muñoz (born 1982), Cuban middle-distance runner
- Adriana Muñoz D'Albora (born 1948), Chilean sociologist and politician
- Adriana Muriel, Colombian racing cyclist
- Adriana Nanclares (born 2002), Spanish football goalkeeper
- Adriana of Nassau-Siegen (1449–1477), German Countess
- Adriana Năstase-Simion-Zamfir (born 1972), Romanian table tennis player
- Adriana Nechita (born 1983), Romanian handballer
- Adriana Nelson (born 1980), Romanian-American long-distance runner
- Adriana Neumann de Oliveira (born 1980), Brazilian mathematician
- Adriana Nieto (born 1978), Mexican actress
- Adriana Nikolova (born 1988), Bulgarian chess player
- Adriana Ocampo (born 1955), Colombian planetary geologist
- Adriana Olguín (1911–2015), Chilean lawyer and politician
- Adriana Ozores (born 1959), Spanish actress
- Adriana Paniagua (born 1995), Nicaraguan model and beauty pageant winner
- Adriana Parente (born 1980), Brazilian footballer
- Adriana Paz (born 1980), Mexican actress and dancer
- Adriana Pereira (born 1964), Brazilian swimmer
- Adriana Pérez (born 1992), Venezuelan tennis player
- Adriana Pesci, Argentine mathematician and mathematical physicist
- Adriana Petit (born 1984), Spanish artist
- Adriana Peña (born 1964), Uruguayan dentist and politician
- Adriana Pichardo, Venezuelan politician
- Adriana Pincherle (1905–1996), Italian painter
- Adriana Poli Bortone (born 1943), Italian politician
- Adriana Pop (born 1965), French-Romanian gymnastics choreographer and gymnast
- Adriana Porter (1857–1946), Canadian-American alleged witch
- Adriana Prieto (1950–1974), Brazilian actress
- Adriana Prosenjak (born 1963), Croatian handball player and coach
- Adriana Puiggrós (born 1941), Argentine writer, academic, and politician
- Adriana E. Ramírez, American writer
- Adriana Randall, South African politician
- Adriana Ranera (born 2005), Spanish footballer
- Adriana Reami (born 1997), American tennis player
- Adriana Rendón (born 1971), Colombian sport shooter
- Adriana Reverón (born 1985), Spanish model and beauty pageant winner
- Adriana Riveramelo (born 1970), Mexican journalist, presenter, and television actress
- Adriana Rodrigues (born 1992), Portuguese footballer
- Adriana Rodríguez (born 1999), Cuban long jumper
- Adriana Rodríguez Vizcarra (born 1949), Mexican politician
- Adriana Roel (1934–2022), Mexican actress
- Adriana Romero (born 1979), Colombian actress
- Adriana Rozwadowska, Polish journalist
- Adriana Ruano (born 1995), Guatemalan sports shooter
- Adriana Russo (born 1954), Italian actress and television personality
- Adriana Sachs (born 1993), Argentine footballer
- Adriana Săftoiu (born 1967), Romanian politician
- Adriana Salazar Varón (born 1963), Colombian chess player
- Adriana Salvatierra (born 1989), Bolivian political scientist and politician
- Adriana Samuel (born 1966), Brazilian volleyball player
- Adriana Santos (born 1971), Brazilian basketball player
- Adriana Sarur (born 1974), Mexican politician
- Adriana Seroni (1922–1984), Italian journalist and politician
- Adriana Serra (1923–1995), Italian actress
- Adriana Serra Zanetti (born 1976), Italian tennis player
- Adriana Sivieri (1918–1970), Argentine-Italian actress
- Adriana Sklenarikova (born 1971), Slovak actress and fashion model
- Adriana Smits (born 1967), Dutch archer
- Adriana Spilberg (1652–1700), Dutch painter
- Adriana Szili (born 1985), Australian tennis player
- Adriana Taranto (born 1999), Australian footballer
- Adriana Tarasov, Romanian sprint canoer
- Adriana Taylor (born 1946), Australian politician
- Adriana Terrazas Porras (born 1966), Mexican politician
- Adriana Tirado (born 1998), Puerto Rican footballer
- Adriana Torrebejano (born 1991), Spanish actress
- Adriana Trigiani (born 1970), American novelist, television writer, producer and film director
- Adriana Turea (born 1975), Romanian luger
- Adriana Ugarte (born 1985), Spanish actress
- Adriana Umaña-Taylor, American psychologist and professor
- Adriana Vacarezza (born 1961), Chilean actress
- Adriana Valdés (born 1943), Chilean writer
- Adriana van der Plaats (born 1971), Dutch swimmer
- Adriana van Ravenswaay (1816–1872), Dutch painter
- Adriana van Tongeren (c.1691–1764), Dutch stage actress
- Adriana Varejão (born 1964), Brazilian artist
- Adriana Varela (born 1952), Argentine tango singer
- Adriana Vargas, Colombian journalist
- Adriana Vasini (born 1987), Venezuelan beauty queen and 2nd runner-up at Miss World 2010
- Adriana Vega (born 1960), Spanish actress
- Adriana Venegas (born 1989), Costa Rican footballer
- Adriana Ventura (born 1969), Brazilian politician
- Adriana Vieyra Olivares (born 1961), Mexican politician
- Adriana Vigneri (born 1939), Italian academic, lawyer, and politician
- Adriana Vilagoš (born 2004), Serbian javelin thrower
- Adriana Villagrán (born 1956), Argentine tennis player
- Adriana Volpe (born 1973), Italian TV presenter, model and actress
- Adriana Xenides (1956–2010), Australian television personality

=== Fictional characters ===
- Adriana Cramer, on the American soap opera One Life to Live
- Adriana La Cerva, on the HBO TV series The Sopranos

== Adrianna ==
=== People ===
- Adrianna Bertola (born 1999), English actress and singer
- Adrianna Biedrzyńska (born 1962), Polish actress
- Adrianna Costa (born 1981), American television personality
- Adrianna Foster (born 1986), Mexican singer of soul, jazz, and pop
- Adrianna Franch (born 1990), American soccer goalkeeper
- Adrianna Freeman, American singer-songwriter who specializes in country music and Americana
- Adrianna Górna (born 1996), Polish handballer
- Adrianna Hicks (born 1989), American actress
- Adrianna Hungerford (1858–1946), American temperance activist, leader
- Adrianna Lamalle (born 1982), French hurdler
- Adrianna Płaczek (born 1993), Polish handballer
- Adrianna So (born 1992), Filipina actress
- Adrianna Sułek (born 1999), Polish pentathlon athlete
- Adrianna Topolnicka (born 1999), Polish middle-distance runner

=== Fictional characters ===
- Adrianna (Adrian Pennino) Pennino-Balboa from the Rocky series, played by Talia Shire
- Adrianna "Ade" Tate-Duncan, on the television series 90210, portrayed by Jessica Lowndes
