= Petit =

Petit (English: /pəˈtiː/, French: [pəti]) is a French-language surname literally meaning "small" or "little". Notable people with the surname include:

- Adriana Petit (born 1984), Spanish multidisciplinary artist
- Alexis Thérèse Petit (1791–1820), French physicist
- Amandine Petit (born 1997), French model, beauty pageant titleholder, and Miss France 2021
- Antoine Petit (1722–1794), French physician
- Antoni Martí Petit, prime minister of Andorra
- Cavelier Petit, American politician
- François Pourfour du Petit (1664–1741), French anatomist
- Gabrielle Petit (1893–1916), Belgian spy
- Gabrielle Petit (feminist) (1860–1952), French feminist activist, anticlerical, libertarian socialist, newspaper editor
- Henriette Petit (1894-1983), Chilean painter
- Jean-Martin Petit (1772–1856), French General during the Napoleonic Wars
- Luis Romero Petit (1917–2017), Venezuelan baseball player
- Monique Ruck-Petit (born 1942), Swiss and French chess master
- Paul Petit (aviator) (1890-1918), French flying ace
- Paul Petit (racing driver) (born 1993), French racing driver
- Philippe Petit (born 1949), French high-wire artist
- Pierre Petit (photographer) (1832–1909), French photographer
- Pierre Petit (scholar) (1617–1687), French scholar, medical writer, and poet
- Pierre Petit (engineer), (1598–1677), French military engineer, mathematician, and physicist
- Pierre Petit (cinematographer) (1920–1997), French cinematographer
- Pierre Petit (composer) (1922–2000), French composer
- Pierre Petit (politician) (1930–2022), Martinique politician
- Pierre Petit (driver), (born 1957), French racecar driver
- Roland Petit (1924–2011), French choreographer and dancer
- The surname for a prominent Parsi family of India, whose members include:
  - Dinshaw Maneckji Petit, (1823–1901), Indian industrialist
  - His granddaughter Rattanbai Petit (1900–1929), wife of Jinnah, founder of Pakistan
- The Petit Family, 2007 Connecticut home invasion and murder victims
- John F. Petit (1887–1963), American businessman and politician
- John Louis Petit (1801–1868), English clergyman and architectural artist
- Rosa Petit, Venezuelan politician
- Sauveur Abel Aubert Petit de la Saussaye (1792–1870), French malacologist
- Yusmeiro Petit (born 1984), Venezuelan baseball player

== Footballers ==
- Emmanuel Petit (born 1970), former French midfielder, who played for France, Monaco, Arsenal, Barcelona and Chelsea
- Gonzalo Petit (born 2006), Uruguayan forward
- Petit (Portuguese footballer) (Armando Gonçalves Teixeira, born 1976), Portuguese midfielder
- Jean Petit (Belgian footballer) (1914—44), Belgian defender
- Jean Petit (footballer, born 1949) (born 1949), former French midfielder
- Paulinho Le Petit (born 1989), former Brazilian midfielder
- Petit Sory (born 1945), former Guinean forward
- René Petit (1899–1989), Franco-Spanish engineer and a footballer in his youth

== Food ==
- Petit four
