= Pupovac =

Pupovac (Serbian Cyrillic: Пуповац) is a Serbian surname, derived from the noun pup (bud). The surname refers to the wealthy medieval clan spreading out into a few family branches in the territory of Zadar County. It may refer to:

- Adrijana Pupovac, Serbian politician
- Branka Pupovac, Australian wheelchair tennis player
- Milorad Pupovac, Croatian-Serb politician and linguist
- Sergio Pupovac, Luxembourg footballer
