= Adrijana =

Female given name

- Gender: Female
- Language: Croatian, Serbian, Slovene

Origin
- Meaning: Wisdom
- Region of origin: Croatia, Serbia, Slovenia

Other names
- Alternative spelling: Cyrillic: Адријана

Adrijana is a given name of Slavic origin, meaning Adriana. Notable people with the name include:

- Adrijana Delić (born 1996), Serbian footballer
- Adrijana Hodžić (born 1975), Kosovar politician
- Adrijana Knežević (born 1987), Serbian basketball player
- Adrijana Krasniqi (born 1997), Swedish singer of Albanian-Macedonian origin
- Adrijana Lekaj (born 1995), Kosovan-Croatian tennis player
- Adrijana Mori (born 2000), Slovenian footballer
- Adrijana Pupovac (born 1984), Serbian politician
