= Andriana (disambiguation) =

Andriana is both the name of the noble class and a title of nobility in Madagascar.

Andriana may also refer to:

- Raisa Andriana (born 1990), Indonesian singer, songwriter, and occasional actress
- Andriana Babali (born 1976), Greek singer and songwriter
- Andriana Bânova (born 1987), Bulgarian triple jumper
- Andriana Yordanova, Bulgarian-born soprano
- 3413 Andriana, an asteroid
- Andriana (plant), a genus of plants in the family Apiaceae
- The name of the boat (alternative spelling Adriana) that sank in the 2023 Pylos migrant boat disaster

== See also ==
- Adriana
