= Pierre Petit =

Pierre Petit may refer to:

- Pierre Petit (engineer) (1594–1677), French military engineer, mathematician, and physicist
- Pierre Petit (scholar) (1617–1687), French poet, doctor, and classicist
- Pierre Petit (photographer) (1832–1909), French photographer
- Pierre Petit de Julleville (1876–1947), French Catholic archbishop
- Pierre Petit (cinematographer) (1920–1997), French cinematographer
- Pierre Petit (composer) (1922–2000), French composer
- Pierre Petit (politician) (born 1930), Martinique politician
- Pierre Petit (racing driver) (born 1957), French racecar driver
