= Girls in Tech =

Nonprofit tech organization

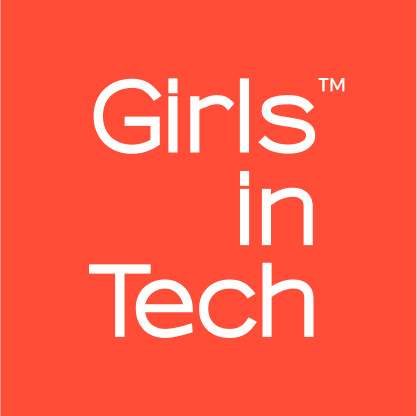
- Industry: Global Non-Profit
- Founded: 2007
- Founders: Adriana Gascoigne
- Defunct: 2024 (announced)
- Headquarters: San Francisco, United States
- Key people: Adriana Gascoigne (Founder, CEO)
- Website: girlsintech.org

Girls in Tech was a global non-profit organization focused on the engagement, education, and empowerment of women in technology. Founded in 2007 by Adriana Gascoigne, the organization had grown from San Francisco to more than 50 chapters located in North America, Europe, Asia, Middle East, Africa, and South America. On July 8, 2024 Gascoigne announced the organization would be closing due to a lack of funding.

== History ==
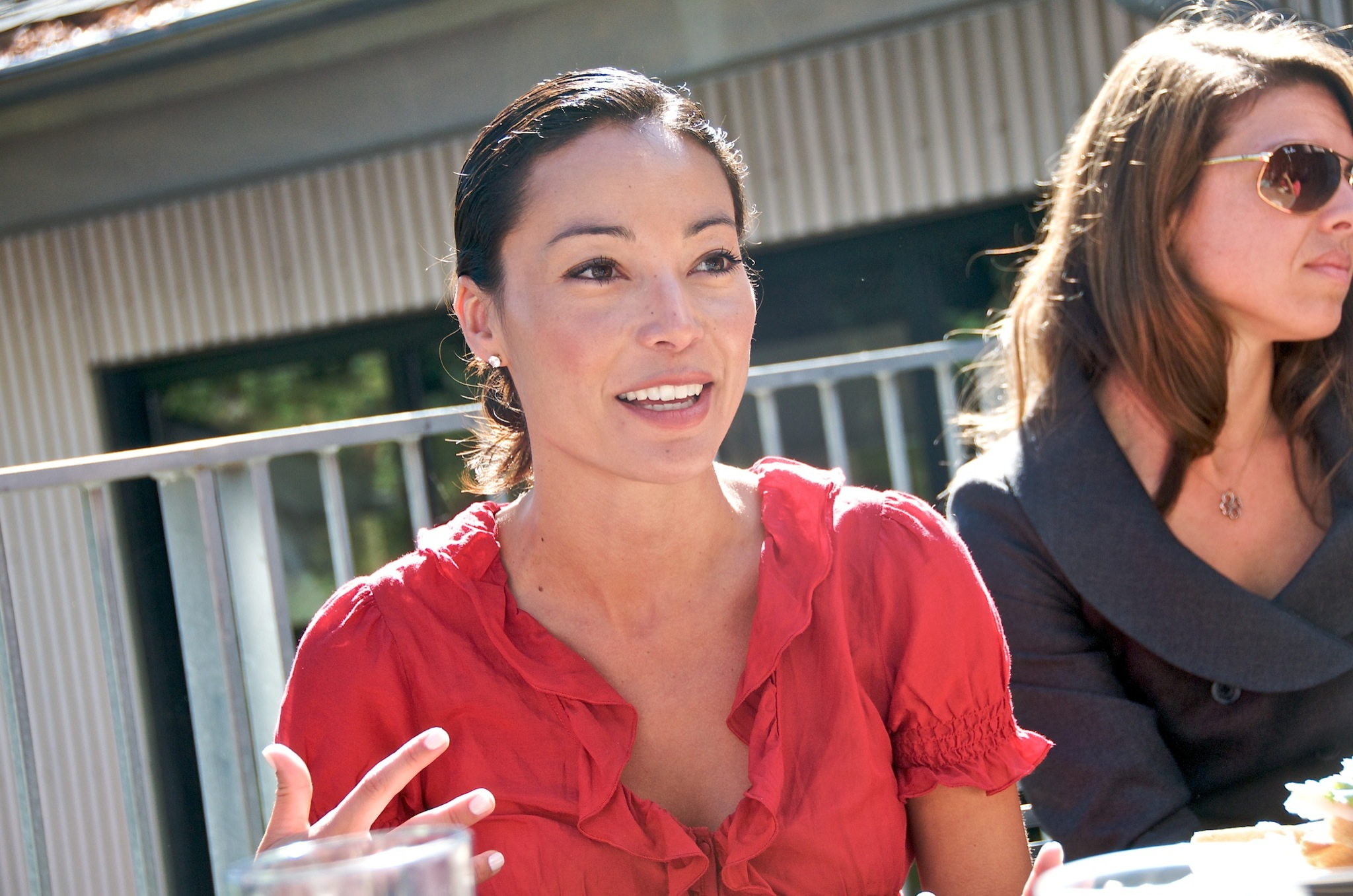
Co-founder Adriana Gascoigne

Adriana Gascoigne launched Girls in Tech in San Francisco in February 2007 after noticing she was one of the only females at her tech company.

In July 2008, the second chapter of Girls in Tech launched in Los Angeles. The same year, Girls in Tech New York launched in December.

The first international chapter of Girls in Tech was launched in London in 2009, along with new chapters in Austin, Boston, and Portland.

In April 2015, at a Girls in Tech conference in Phoenix, Tania Katan introduced "It Was Never a Dress," which reimagined the generic symbol for a woman on bathroom signs as wearing a cape instead of a dress.

In July 2015, there were 47 chapters worldwide.

In January 2016, ESPN Women partnered with Girls in Tech for a Hackathon ahead of the Super Bowl.

In May 2016, Girls in Tech partnered with Traction Labs to offer free office space in San Francisco to women and minority entrepreneurs.

In 2022, the organization moved its headquarters from San Francisco to Nashville.

On July 8, 2024, Girls in Tech announced the organization was closing due to lack of funding.

== Programs ==
In March 2021, Girls in Tech launched an initiative to end gender disparity in boardrooms. Dubbed "Half the Board: 50/50 by 2025," the initiative called upon organizations to commit to gender parity in their boardrooms by 2025. Half the Board: 50/50 by 2025 asked organizations and individuals to commit to taking action to ensure women comprise at least 50 percent of corporate boards in the technology industry. The effort included an open letter penned by Girls in Tech board members to tech leaders demanding gender parity by Dec. 24, 2024. The campaign launched as part of the organization's efforts supporting Women's History Month and International Women's Day, and Girls in Tech Founder and CEO Adriana Gascoigne wrote an op-ed that ran in Newsweek about the need for a "gender parity moonshot" that amplified the initiative.

Girls in Tech has created a number of programs to increase the number of women working in technology, including Global Classroom, an online learning platform that provides access to online courses and resources to improve knowledge in STEM related fields. Other programs include the Amplify Pitch Competition, Mentorship, and tech job openings, amongst others.

In October 2021, Girls in Tech teamed with Amazon Web Services (AWS) to get more women into public sector jobs through a mentorship and training initiative.

== See also ==
- hackNY
- Girls Who Code
