= Adriana Benitez =

Colombian activist (1975–2000)

Adriana Benítez
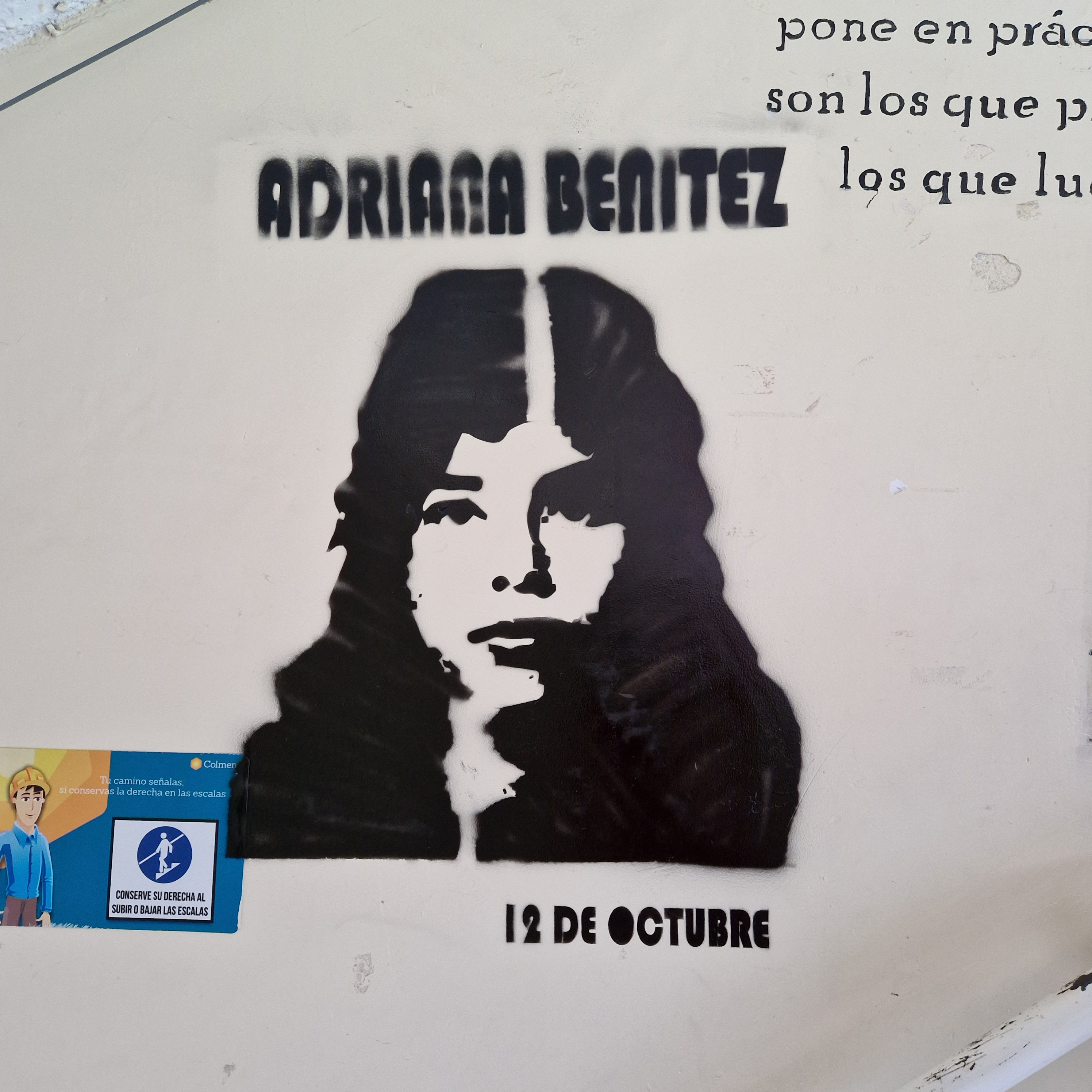
- Born: Adriana Fernanda Benitez Perugache; 31 October 1975; Pasto
- Died: 14 October 2000 (aged 24); Pasto
- Occupation: Student
- Known for: Murder

Adriana Fernanda Benitez Perugache (31 October 1975 – 14 October 2000) was a Colombian student leader and founder of Radicales Libres who was murdered by the United Self-Defense Forces of Colombia. She became known as the "Flower of the University (of Nariño)" (Spanish: La Flora de la Universidad).

== Biography ==
Adriana Benítez was born on 31 October 1975 the third of five sisters in San Rafael Hospital, Pasto, Colombia. After she graduated high school, she entered the University of Nariño to study economics. At 18, she had a child and was obliged to enter the workforce to pay for her tuition and family, which was difficult because of low wages. In this environment, she became a socialist and began meeting and working with local women to at first procure items for families and then improved working conditions, rights, and benefits.

At the university-level, she founded the student group Radicales Libres and led student demonstrations against the 1999 National Development Plan and organized the Departmental Forum Against the Colombia Plan. She also advocated for the reduction of motor vehicles in Pasto and organized protests against Plan Colombia.

== Murder ==
On 14 October 2000, Benítez and fellow student Martín Emilio Rodríguez were shot dead on the Plaza de Nariño in Pasto by Guillermo Pérez Alzate, alias "Pablo Sevillano," a United Self-Defense Forces of Colombia (AUC) gunman acting on the orders of Carlos Castaño Gil while she was meeting with local women. The motive for the shooting was that she had "worked with FARC in the El Caguán DMZ." While exiting a restaurant, Pérez and an accomplice exited a red van and shot Benítez and Rodríguez in the back and then fled to the other side of the square to re-enter the van and escape.

Benítez's murder came at a time when the organized student body at the University of Nariño had been strengthened by their demonstrations in 1998 and 1999 against the government of Andrés Pastrana Arango. The organized students, already identified by right-wing paramilitaries as a potential ally to left-wing guerrillas and considered by the AUC since 199 to be "infiltrated," began to more freely associate with other leftist organizations.

== Legacy ==
One of the female dormitories at the National University of Colombia at Manizales is named after Benítez.
