= Adriana Bisi Fabbri =

Italian painter (1881–1918)

- Adriana Bisi Fabbri, Autoritratto, 1914
- Born: Adriana Fabbri; 1881; Ferrara, Italy
- Died: 1918 (aged 36–37); Travedona-Monate, Italy
- Known for: Painting
- Spouse: Giannetto Bisi

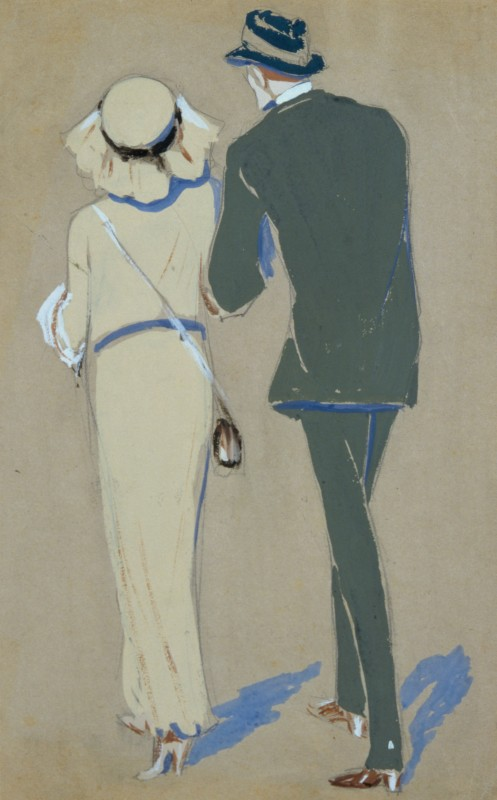
All'ippodromo, 1913 (Art collections of Fondazione Cariplo)

Adriana Bisi Fabbri (1881–1918) was an Italian painter.

== Biography ==
Adriana Fabbri was born in Ferrara, where she met her future husband, journalist Giannetto Bisi, and she spent part of her youth in Padua as a guest of Umberto Boccioni’s mother. In Padua, and later in Milan, where she moved with the family in 1905, she produced numerous painting studies. As a self-taught artist, she developed further by frequenting Gaetano Previati and Luigi Conconi studios.

In 1907, she moved to Bergamo with her husband and the following year she made her debut with two drawings at the 2nd Quadriennale in Turin. In 1911, she participated in Frigidarium, the international humour exhibition organised at Castello di Rivoli, where she won the bronze medal; in the same year she took part in the 1st Esposizione Libera organised in Milan by Boccioni and other Futurist intellectuals. In later years she participated in other group exhibitions, including those at the Ca’ Pesaro in Venice, the Famiglia Artistica and the Società per le Belle Arti ed Esposizione Permanente in Milan.

In 1914, she became a member of the Nuove Tendenze group and organised a solo exhibition of 51 works at the Milan store of the Enrico Finzi company. She was also sought after as a portraitist and, during the First World War, many of her political caricatures were published in Il Popolo d’Italia; she also contributed to La Domenica Illustrata and created fashion plates for the couture house founded by Domenico Ventura.

Adriana Fabbri died in Travedona-Monate (Varese) in 1918.
