= Siega =

Siega is a surname. Notable people with the surname include:

- Jorge Siega (born 1947), Brazilian footballer
- Marcos Siega (born 1969) American film, television, commercial and music video director
- Maurizio Siega (born 1954), Italian long jumper and triple jumper
- Nicholas Siega (born 1991), Italian professional football player

== See also ==
- Anna Maria Siega-Riz, American nutritionist
- Siegas, New Brunswick
