= Adriana Lisboa =

Brazilian writer

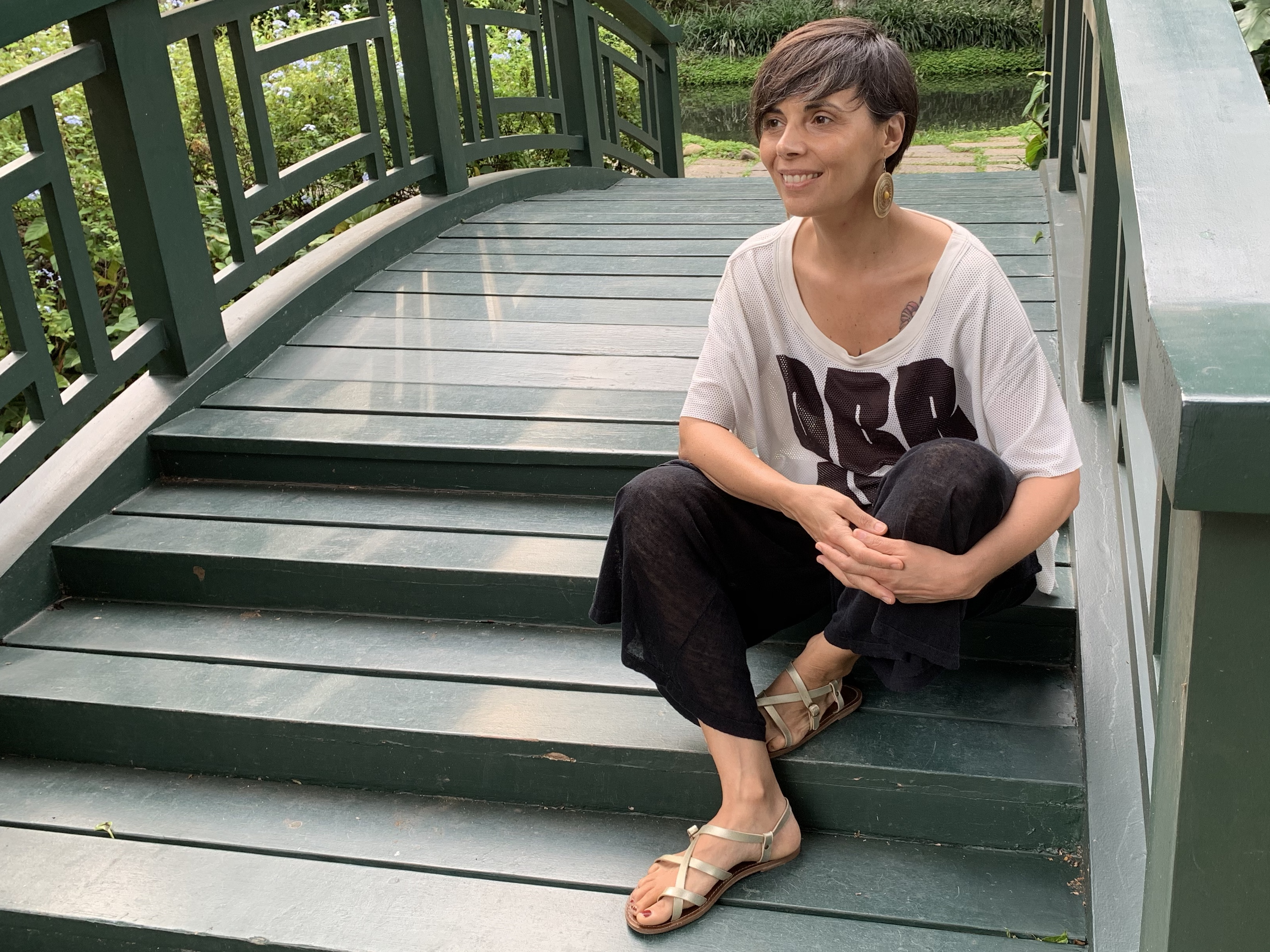
- Born: April 25, 1970 (age 56); Rio de Janeiro, Brazil
- Occupation: Writer
- Writing career
- Genres: Fiction, poetry
- Notable works: Crow-blue, Symphony in White, Hanoi
- Website: adrianalisboa.com

Adriana Lisboa (born April 25, 1970) is a Brazilian writer. She is the author of seven novels, and has also published poetry, short stories, essays, and books for children. Her books have been translated into more than a dozen languages. Crow Blue is Lisboa's most recent novel translated into English (Bloomsbury, UK, 2013) and was named a book of the year by The Independent (London). Her stories and poems have appeared in Granta, Modern Poetry in Translation, The Brooklyn Rail, Litro, The Missing Slate, Joyland, Sonofabook, Waxwing, and others.

Adriana Lisboa is one of Brazil's leading authors. Her work has been the recipient of, among others, the following honors: the José Saramago Prize of Literature for Symphony in White (novel), a Japan Foundation Fellowship, a Brazilian National Library Fellowship, and the Newcomer of the Year Award from the Brazilian section of International Board on Books for Young People for Língua de trapos (A Tongue Made of Scraps), a book of poetry for children. In 2007, Hay Festival/Bogota World Book Capital selected her as one of the 39 most important Latin American writers under the age of 39.

== Biography ==
Adriana Lisboa has lived in Brazil, France, New Zealand and the United States. She graduated from the Federal State University of Rio de Janeiro (Unirio) with a BFA degree in Music, and has a MFA in Brazilian Literature and a PhD in Comparative Literature from Rio de Janeiro State University (Uerj). She was a visiting scholar at the International Research Center for Japanese Studies in Kyoto, at the University of New Mexico and at the University of Texas, Austin. In 2014 and 2017 she was a writer in residence at the University of California, Berkeley.

Lisboa previously worked as a musician. She started to make a living singing Brazilian music in France at age eighteen, and afterwards was a flautist and music teacher in Brazil.

Also a translator working with the English, French and Spanish languages, she has translated into Portuguese the fiction, poetry and nonfiction of Emily Brontë, Margaret Atwood, José Lezama Lima, Marguerite Duras, Maurice Blanchot, Cormac McCarthy, Jonathan Safran Foer, and Robert Louis Stevenson, among others.

Lisboa is a vegan and an animal rights advocate. She has explored this subject in her fiction and poetry.

== Published works ==
=== Novels ===
- Todos os santos – Brazil, 2019. Publisher: Alfaguara.
- Hanoi – Brazil, 2013. Publisher: Alfaguara.
- Crow Blue – United Kingdom, 2013/USA, 2014. Original title: Azul corvo, 2010. Publisher: Bloomsbury.
- Hut of Fallen Persimmons – USA, 2011. Original title: Rakushisha, 2007. Publisher: Texas Tech University Press
- Um beijo de colombina – Brazil, 2003.
- Symphony in White – USA, 2010. Original title: Sinfonia em branco, 2001. Publisher: Texas Tech University Press.
- Os fios da memória – Brazil, 1999 (out of print)

=== Poetry ===
- O vivo – Brazil, 2021. Publisher: Relicário.
- Deriva – Brazil, 2019. Publisher: Relicário.
- Equator (selected poems) – India, 2019. Publisher: Poetrywala.
- Pequena música – Brazil, 2018. Publisher: Iluminuras.
- Parte da paisagem – Brazil, 2014. Publisher: Iluminuras. Poems from this book appeared in "Modern Poetry in Translation: Twisted Angels", 2014

=== Essay ===
- Todo o tempo que existe – Brazil, 2022. Publisher: Relicário.

=== Short stories ===
- O sucesso – Brazil, 2016. Stories from this book appeared in Granta.
- Caligrafias – Brazil, 2004. Stories from this book appeared in Brazil: A Traveler's Literary Companion (Whereabouts Press), Litro magazine #114, BrooklynRail.com, Joyland Magazine and Waxwing.

=== For young adults ===
- O coração às vezes para de bater – 2007.

=== For children ===
- Um rei sem majestade – 2019
- A sereia e o caçador de borboletas – 2009
- Contos populares japoneses – 2007.
- Língua de trapos – 2005

== Recording from the Library of Congress ==
Adriana Lisboa reading from her own work (2015).

== Awards and Recognitions ==
- 2003 José Saramago Prize for Symphony in White (Portugal)
- 2005 Moinho Santista Award for her body of work (Brazil)
- 2006 Newcomer of the Year Award, Fundação Nacional do Livro Infantil e Juvenil – Brazilian Section of IBBY for Língua de trapos (Brazil)
- Highly Recommended, Fundação Nacional do Livro Infantil e Juvenil – Brazilian Section of IBBY, for Língua de trapos and Contos populares japoneses
- 2007 Hay Festival/Bogota World Book Capital – selected as one of the 39 most distinguished Latin American writers under the age of 39
- 2004 and 2008 Jabuti Award – Shortlisted in the Best Novel of the Year category, for Um beijo de colombina and Rakushisha (Brazil)
- 2009 Grand prix des lectrices de Elle – Shortlisted in the Best Novel category for Des roses rouge vif/Sinfonia em branco (France)
- 2011 PEN Center USA Literary Awards – Shortlisted in the translated fiction category for Symphony in White – translated by Sarah Green (USA)
- 2011 São Paulo Prize for Literature — Shortlisted in the Best Book of the Year category for Azul-corvo (Brazil)
- 2011 Zaffari & Bourbon Award – Shortlisted in the Best Book of the Year category for Azul-corvo (Brazil)
- 2014 São Paulo Prize for Literature — Shortlisted in the Best Book of the Year category for Hanói
- 2018 honorary mention Casa de las Américas Award for Pequena música

== Filmography ==
'Herdeiros de Saramago - Episode 3: Adriana Lisboa'. Documentary | 2019 | Color | HD | 27.7 min. Directed by Graça Castanheira, shot in January 2019 in Rio de Janeiro, Brazil. https://www.rtp.pt/play/p7972/e505734/herdeiros-de-saramago

Lisboa. Documentary | 2012 | Color | HD | 30 min. Produced by Heritage Film Project, LLC, with the support of the Brazilian Ministry of External Relations | Embassy of Brazil, Washington, D.C. Directed by Eduardo Montes-Bradley. Film based on the experiences of Brazilian Writer Adriana Lisboa shot in February 2012 on location in and around Boulder. Premiered on WHTJ PBS / WCVE PBS, Virginia, also aired by Rocky Mountain PBS.
