= Adriana Marais =

South African theoretical physicist, quantum biologist and Martian astronaut candidate

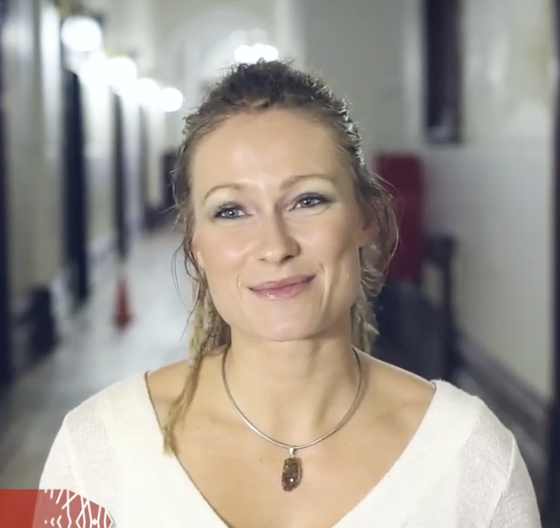
- Marais at TEDxCapeTown 2015
- Born: 15 August 1983 (age 43); King Williams Town, South Africa
- Education: University of Cape Town (BSc Hons) University of KwaZulu-Natal (MSc, PhD)
- Known for: Projects encouraging STEM and space exploration
- Scientific career
- Fields: Quantum cryptography Quantum biology
- Workplaces: Centre for Quantum Technologies; SAP Africa
- Thesis: Quantum Effects in Photosynthesis (2014)
- Website: Adriana Marais; Proudly Human; Foundation for Space Development Africa

Adriana Marais is a South African theoretical physicist, technologist and advocate for off-world exploration. She is a director of the Foundation for Space Development Africa, the organisation leading Africa's first mission to the Moon, the Africa2Moon Project. She is the founder of Proudly Human, an initiative of which is the Off-World Project, a series of habitation experiments in Earth's most extreme environments.

For her research in quantum biology and the origins of life, she received awards including the 2015 L'Oreal-UNESCO International Rising Talent Award. In 2025, she won the Forbes Woman Africa Academic Excellence Award, as well as Women in Tech's Most Disruptive Woman in Tech Award.

In 2025, her book 'Out of this World and into the Next' was published by Profile Books.

== Education and career ==
Marais completed a BSc Hons 1st class (theoretical physics) at the University of Cape Town (UCT) in 2004, followed by an MSc summa cum laude (quantum cryptography) at the University of KwaZulu-Natal (UKZN) in 2010. She was awarded a PhD (quantum biology) from UKZN in 2015 for her research on quantum effects in photosynthesis and her postdoctoral research focused on the origins of prebiotic molecules and life itself. She enrolled at UCT in 2019 as a PhD candidate in economics with a focus on economic systems for resource constrained environments.

During her postgraduate studies, she lectured at UKZN from 2007 to 2013 and was a visiting researcher at the Centre for Quantum Technologies, Singapore, from 2011 to 2012.

From 2017 to 2019, she was Head of Innovation at SAP Africa and in 2018 she joined the faculty of Singularity University. In 2019, Marais founded Proudly Human, an organisation focusing on building infrastructure and teams in extreme environments in preparation for life on the Moon, Mars and beyond, as well as to provide solutions for those living in harsh conditions here on Earth.

=== Foundation for Space Development Africa ===
Marais was a special project coordinator of the Foundation for Space Development in 2016, and in 2017, became co-director with Khutšo Ngoasheng and founding director Carla Sharpe Mitchell. The organisation is developing Africa's first lunar mission and the world's first lunar radio astronomy array, the Africa2Moon Project, as well as driving projects projects spanning big data; supercomputing; climate modelling; and utilisation of space resources. The Foundation is dedicated to advancing Africa's role in the space sector, thereby inspiring the next generation of African scientists, engineers and innovators.

On 24 April 2025, the Africa2Moon payload was selected for launch to the lunar south pole with China's Chang'e-8 mission scheduled for 2029.

=== Proudly Human ===
Proudly Human's Off-World Project will demonstrate human resilience, sustainability and community spirit in even the most extreme environments through grit, imagination, research and innovation. The project prepares for life on the Moon, Mars and beyond, as well as providing solutions for those living in harsh conditions here on Earth. Over the next few years, Proudly Human will run a series of habitation experiments, building communities and off-grid infrastructure in the most extreme environments on the planet, from the desert, to Antarctica, to under the ocean. Each experiment will last several months, generate exploration-driven innovation and research, and be filmed for a documentary series.

In 2019, Marais completed location scouts to the Antarctic interior, deserts in Africa, America and the Middle East, as well as the Aquarius Reef Base undersea facility in Florida. On 1 February 2021, a global call for applications for crew for the Off-World Project opened.

=== Mars One ===
In 2013, Marais volunteered for the Mars One Project, a private organisation, planning one-way trips to establish the first human settlement on Mars in 2026. Marais was shortlisted as one of 100 astronaut candidates with the project. In February 2019, however, Mars One declared bankruptcy.

== Membership and recognition ==
Marais has received several awards, including:

- Women in Tech Global's Most Disruptive Woman in Tech Award (2025)
- Forbes Woman Academic Excellence Award (2025)
- Royal Society of South Africa Meiring Naude Medal for exceptional young researcher (2016)
- Alumna of the 66th Lindau Nobel Laureate Physics program (2016)
- Global Women's Forum Rising Talent Award (2016)
- L'Oreal-UNESCO International Rising Talent Award (2015)
- Department of Science and Technology Women in Science Fellowship Award 2010

== Personal life ==
In 2016, Marais completed the Two Oceans 56km Ultramarathon. In 2017, she summited Uhuru Peak, Mount Kilimanjaro.

== See also ==
- L'Oreal-UNESCO International Rising Talent Award
- Simonetta Di Pippo
- Singularity University
- Mars One
