= Adriana de Vecchi =

Cellist and music educator in Portugal

- Born: 14 September 1896; Viana do Castelo, Portugal
- Died: 1995 Age 99; Lisbon, Portugal
- Occupation(s): cellist and educator
- Years active: 75
- Known for: Fundação Musical dos Amigos das Crianças

Adriana de Vecchi was a Portuguese cellist, Montessori-trained educator and founder of a music school for children in Lisbon.

Adriana de Vecchi was born in Viana do Castelo in the north of Portugal on 14 September 1896, to a Portuguese father and an Italian mother. The family moved to Italy when she was two years old, and she received her education there. Her brothers became pianists, while her elder sister was a violinist. De Vecchi studied piano and cello at the Conservatory of Turin and was trained as a teacher, following the principles of Maria Montessori.

Returning to the Portuguese capital of Lisbon in the early 1920s, De Vecchi met her future husband, Fernando Costa, who was also a cellist. Initially, she worked as a journalist and translator of works from Portuguese to Italian. She also wrote short stories and gave lectures on music and teaching. In 1953 she lectured on "The Teaching of Music in Childhood and its Projection into the Future" at the João de Deus Museum in Lisbon. After hearing the lecture, the philanthropist and patron of the arts Sofia Abecassis agreed to provide rooms in her residence for a music school. On 29 June of the same year, the Musical Foundation of Friends of Children (Fundação Musical dos Amigos das Crianças - FMAC) was opened.

The school started by offering cello lessons given by De Vecchi, piano lessons by Abreu Mota, violin lessons by José Lamy da Costa Reis and choral singing lessons by Jaime Silva. Classes were held three times a week and were for both girls and boys, which was somewhat innovative for the time in Portugal. De Vecchi also developed easy-to-assimilate materials to teach music to children of pre-school age. In 1954 the Foundation also started a Youth String Orchestra, conducted by Fernando Costa, which has released several records and played throughout Portugal and Europe and from which many players have graduated to join leading orchestras in Portugal. In 1959 De Vecchi also created, with the support of Lisbon City Council, what were known as Cultural Afternoons for Children. These were held in the Estufa Fria greenhouse. Financial and other support to the Foundation was provided by the banker Ricardo Espírito Santo, the philanthropist Olga Álvares Pereira de Melo, the musicologist João de Freitas Branco, the conductor Manuel da Silva Dionísio, and the composer and pianist António Victorino de Almeida, among others.

When her husband died in 1973, De Vecchi asked Leonardo de Barros, one of the first students at the School, to take on the vice-presidency of FMAC and become director of the orchestra, a position he held until 2009. De Barros also became president of the Foundation when De Vecchi died in 1995. With further financial assistance FMAC was able to open the Guilhermina Suggia Music School (Escola de Música Guilhermina Suggia) in Porto and also purchase its own facilities in Lisbon.

In 1978, as part of the celebrations of the 25th anniversary of FMAC, an exhibition was held at the Calouste Gulbenkian Museum in Lisbon on the theme of “Two Lives, One Work” (Duas Vidas, Uma Obra), about De Vecchi and Costa. Adriana de Vecchi died in 1995 at the age of 99.
