= Adriana Sarur =

Mexican politician

- Born: Veracruz, Mexico
- Occupation: Politician
- Political party: PVEM

Adriana Sarur Torre is a Mexican politician from the Ecologist Green Party of Mexico. From 2009 to 2012 she served as Deputy of the LXI Legislature of the Mexican Congress representing Veracruz. And from 2012 to 2015 served as Deputy of the LXIII legislature . Actually she is columnist of the El Heraldo, also is TV host and analyst at ADN40 channel with programs “Desde las Camaras” and “La encerrona”. Director of government relationship of Salinas Group.
