= Andriana Yordanova =

Bulgarian-born soprano based in Malta

Andriana Yordanova (Bulgarian: Андриана Йорданова; also known as Fenech-Yordanova) is a Bulgarian-born soprano based in Malta. She has performed with the Malta Philharmonic Orchestra.

Yordanova started her career as a soloist in the school choir and the Children's opera in her home town of Varna. Her first performances at home and abroad were in 1985 in Amstetten and Baden bei Wien, Austria with the central role in a children's musical.

In 1992 she obtained her master's degree in Russian Language and Literature in the Sofia University and in the same year she continued her music studies in the National Music Academy under the guidance of Professor Ilka Popova. During her studies she won a prize in the First Academic Competition and a bursary from Kraft Jacobs Suchard. She also took part in various student productions and TV broadcastings as well as made her debut on professional stage. In her home town she was under the guidance of the baritone Georgi Koytchev.

In 1997 she won a scholarship and followed a Tosca course in the European Opera Centre in Manchester under the direction of Kent Nagano, Professor Marta Lantieri, Kostas Paskalis, and Renata Scotto. The same year she won a scholarship at 'Academia d'Arte e Cultura Boris Christoff' in Rome and studied under the Italian mezzo-soprano Gianella Borelli.

Back in Bulgaria she won the special prize for contemporary aria at the International singing competition 'Hristo Brambarov' in Sofia with the aria of Magda Sorel from 'The Consul' by Gian Carlo Menotti and received it from the hands of the great Ghena Dimitrova. In 2001 she attended a master class of the renowned Bulgarian tenor Kaludi Kaludov in Varna.

During her studies as a soloist of the Choir at the Russian Church in Sofia she took part in many tours performing orthodox sacred music in Germany. After the third year at the Sofia Music Academy she was given the opportunity to make her debut with the role of Musetta in Puccini's La bohème at the State Opera House in Bourgas under the baton of the great Bulgarian conductor Professor Ivan Vulpe.

At the State Opera House in Varna she performed the roles of Sylva Varescu in the classical Viennese operetta 'The Princess of Czardas' of Imre Kálmán and of Fiordiligi in Mozart's Così fan tutte. She also performed the role of Anna in Nabucco, Tebaldo and Voce del Cielo in Don Carlo in the productions of the State Opera House Varna for the International Varna Summer Music Festival.

In 2002 she made her debut as another Puccinian heroine - Mimi from 'La Bohème' under the baton of the Italian conductor Luciano Di Martino at State Opera House Stara Zagora.

She performed extensively in her home country. Her overseas performances include tours in Germany, Switzerland, Austria, Egypt and Turkey. In 2001 she was invited to give recitals in Malta. After transferring to Malta in 2002 she became one of the leading singers on the island. Between 2002 and 2009 she performed on many occasions and also at extensive personal recitals.

She teaches voice technique at Masquerade Theatre Arts School. She is the director of the Yuri Rozum's music school in Malta.
