= Adriana Vieyra Olivares =

Mexican politician

- Born: 24 August 1961 (age 64); Morelos, Mexico
- Occupation: Politician
- Political party: PAN

Adriana Rebeca Vieyra Olivares (born 24 August 1961) is a Mexican politician from the National Action Party. From 2006 to 2009 she served as Deputy of the LX Legislature of the Mexican Congress representing Morelos.
