= Adriana Cataño =

American actress

Adriana Cataño is an American actress, businesswoman and television host. She has acted in Latin soap operas and has hosted programs on Univision Telemundo, TV Azteca, Fox Sports Americas and Telefutura.

== Biography ==
Cataño was born in Miami, Florida, and is of Colombian descent. She studied Broadcast Journalism at Florida International University. She speaks Spanish, English and French. She has been featured in Latin American as well as USA television programs. She has worked for the top Hispanic networks: Univision, TV Azteca, Fox Sports America's, Telefutura and Telemundo. She was the anchor of Edicion Especial a live-television show based on the entertainment industry. She was the host of Cinemundo and hosted most of Telemundo's specials. She also worked on Don Francisco's Sabado Gigante which is Univision's highest rated show for 7 years being part of the cast of La Familia Fernandez. Hispanics have seen her regularly on top rated shows such as Despierta America, Un Nuevo Dia, Sabado Gigante, El Gordo y La Flaca, Cristina, Suelta La Sopa, Escandalo, Ventaneando, Primer Impacto, Don Francisco Presenta, Viva La Familia de Todo Bebe, just to name a few.

== Career ==
Cataño worked on WE TV's My Life is a Telenovela. She also worked on Nickelodeon LatinAmerica's Grachi.

== Businesswoman ==
Cataño has released a series of skincare products, named "CATANO BEAUTY".
