= Adriana Seroni =

Italian politician (1922–1984)

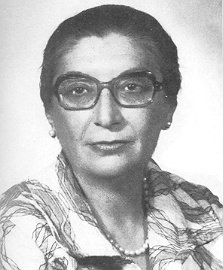

Italian Chamber of Deputies
- In office 1972–1984

Personal details
- Born: 9 June 1922 Florence, Italy
- Died: 9 April 1984 (aged 61)
- Party: Italian Communist Party
- Profession: Politician, journalist

Adriana Fabbri Seroni, commonly known as Adriana Seroni (9 June 1922 – 9 April 1984) was an Italian journalist and politician of the Communist Party, member of the Italian Chamber of Deputies from 1972 to 1984.

== Biography ==
Seroni was born in Florence on 9 June 1922. She finished her degree in humanities and became a journalist. As a journalist, she defended women's rights. In 1972, she became a Chamber of Deputies member for the Italian Communist Party. She was a deputy and a journalist until her death in 1984.

== Bibliography ==
- Adriana Seroni, La questione femminile in Italia, 1970-1977, Editori Riuniti
- Idem, Donne comuniste: identità e confronto, Rome: C. Salemi, 1984
- Massimo d'Alema, A Mosca l'ultima volta: Enrico Berlinguer e il 1984, Editore Donzelli
