= Adriana Bertini =

Brazilian artist

Adriana Bertini is a Brazilian artist who creates dresses from quality-test rejected condoms. Inspired by the HIV-positive children she got to know while volunteering for an AIDS prevention group, Adriana has spent the last ten years creating the sculptural works that aim to convey her message that "condoms must be basic like a pair of jeans and so necessary like a great love."

One of her recent collections, Dress Up Against AIDS: Condom Couture, is an exhibition that ran through March 11 at UCLA's Fowler Museum in Los Angeles, California.

A collection of her works.
