= Adriana Lita =

Romanian materials scientist

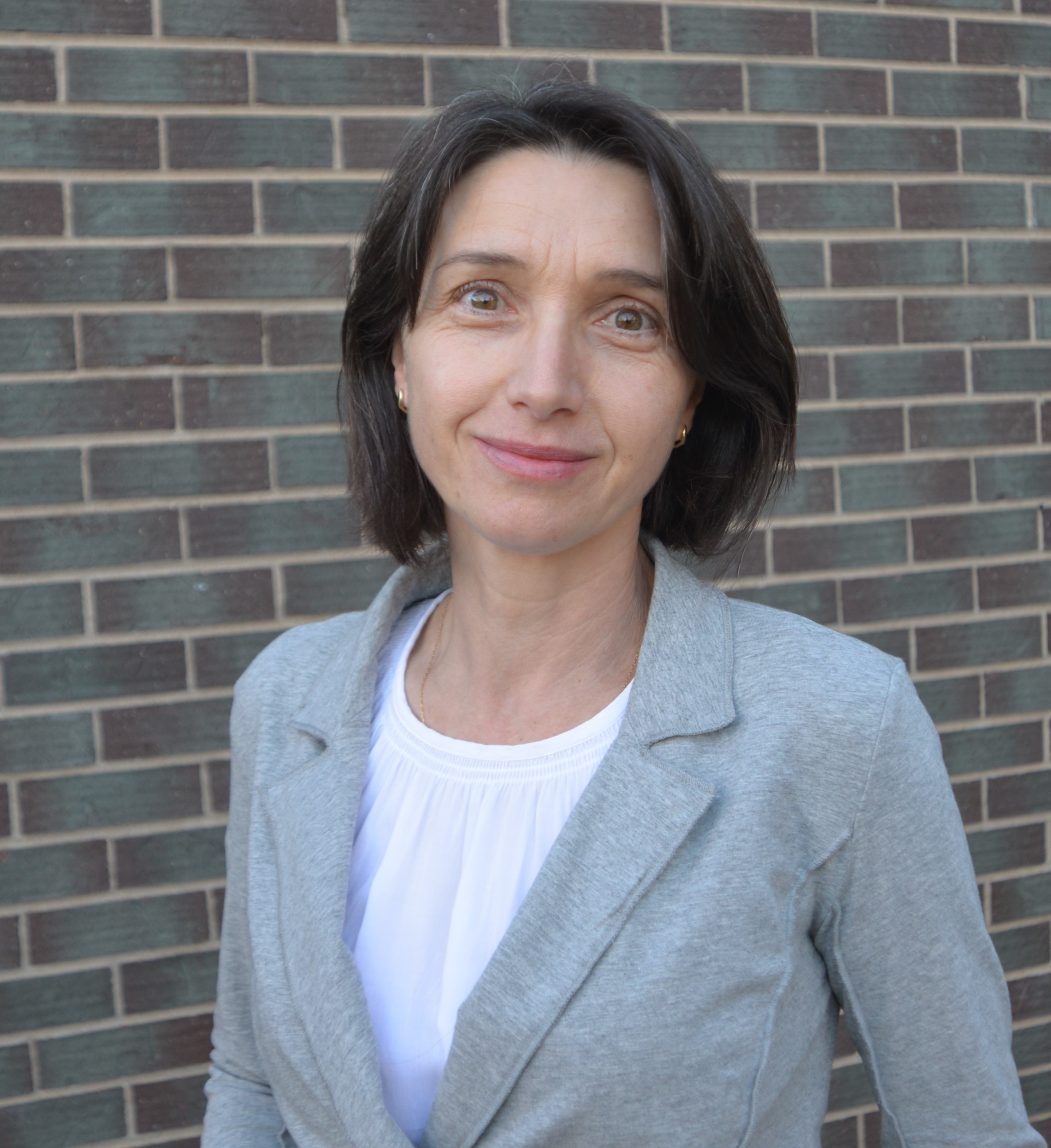
- Lita in 2021
- Other name: Adriana Eleni Lita
- Education: University of Bucharest; University of Michigan
- Awards: Department of Commerce Silver Medal (2021)
- Scientific career
- Fields: Materials science
- Workplaces: National Institute of Standards and Technology
- Thesis: Correlation between microstructure and surface structure evolution in polycrystalline films (2000)
- Doctoral advisor: John E. Sanchez, Jr.

Adriana Eleni Lita is a Romanian materials scientist who is a member of the faint photonics group at National Institute of Standards and Technology. She works on fabrication and development of single-photon detectors such as transition-edge sensors and superconducting nanowire single-photon detector devices.

== Life ==
Lita earned a B.S. in physics from the University of Bucharest. She completed a Ph.D. in materials science and engineering at University of Michigan in 2000. Her dissertation was titled Correlation between microstructure and surface structure evolution in polycrystalline films. Lita's doctoral advisor was John E. Sanchez, Jr.

In 2003, Lita joined the faint photonics group at National Institute of Standards and Technology (NIST) Boulder. She works on fabrication and development of single-photon detectors such as transition-edge sensors (TES) and superconducting nanowire single-photon detector (SNSPD) devices. Her work includes development of record high quantum efficiency TES devices optimized at various wavelengths from UV to near IR, integration of TES with optical waveguides platforms for photonic circuits, as well as materials development for SNSPDs. Her research has included Bell test experiments and the practical implementation of quantum key distribution. In 2021, Lita was awarded the Department of Commerce Silver Medal.

== Selected publications ==
- Marsili, F.; Verma, V. B.; Stern, J. A.; Harrington, S.; Lita, A. E.; Gerrits, T.; Vayshenker, I.; Baek, B.; Shaw, M. D.; Mirin, R. P.; Nam, S. W. (March 2013). "Detecting single infrared photons with 93% system efficiency". Nature Photonics. 7 (3): 210–214. arXiv:1209.5774. Bibcode:2013NaPho...7..210M. doi:10.1038/nphoton.2013.13. ISSN 1749-4893. S2CID 54905458.
- Lita, Adriana E.; Miller, Aaron J.; Nam, Sae Woo (2008). "Counting near-infrared single-photons with 95% efficiency". Optics Express. 16 (5): 3032–40. Bibcode:2008OExpr..16.3032L. doi:10.1364/OE.16.003032. ISSN 1094-4087. PMID 18542389.
- Rosenberg, Danna; Lita, Adriana; Miller, Aaron; Nam, Sae (17 June 2005). "Noise-free high-efficiency photon-number-resolving detectors". Physical Review A. 71 (6) 061803. arXiv:quant-ph/0506175. Bibcode:2005PhRvA..71f1803R. doi:10.1103/PhysRevA.71.061803. ISSN 1050-2947. S2CID 58907453.

== See also ==
- Timeline of women in science in the United States
