= Adriana Maas =

Dutch stage actress (1702–1746)

- Born: 14 September 1702; Amsterdam, Dutch Republic
- Died: 30 November 1746 (aged 44); Amsterdam, Dutch Republic
- Occupation: Stage actress
- Spouse: Paul van Schagen (m. 1727; died 1731)
- Parent(s): Joshua Maas; Valentine Jannetje

Adriana (Ariaantje) Maas (14 September 1702, in Amsterdam – 30 November 1746, in Amsterdam) was a Dutch stage actress. She was counted among the great Dutch stars during her most productive years.

== Biography ==
She was the daughter of carpenter Joshua Maas and Valentine Jannetje. In 1727 she married the actor Paul van Schagen (1698–1731), but the couple remained childless.

As a young girl, she found work as a seamstress in the home of the famous actress Adriana van Tongeren who asked young Adriana to help her with her script. The seamstress proved to have acting potential so she became a student of van Tongeren and appeared on stage at the Amsterdamse Schouwburg from 1722 to 1746. When she was hired in 1722, she earned the beginner's wage of one guilder, later two guilders, per performance.

On 15 August 1727, Maas signed a pre-marital agreement with the actor Paulus van Schagen in Amsterdam, whom she married on 7 September in Sloten.

She was replaced as a leading actress in the 1740s by Anna Maria de Bruyn.
