= Adriana Gascoigne =

American technology executive and activist

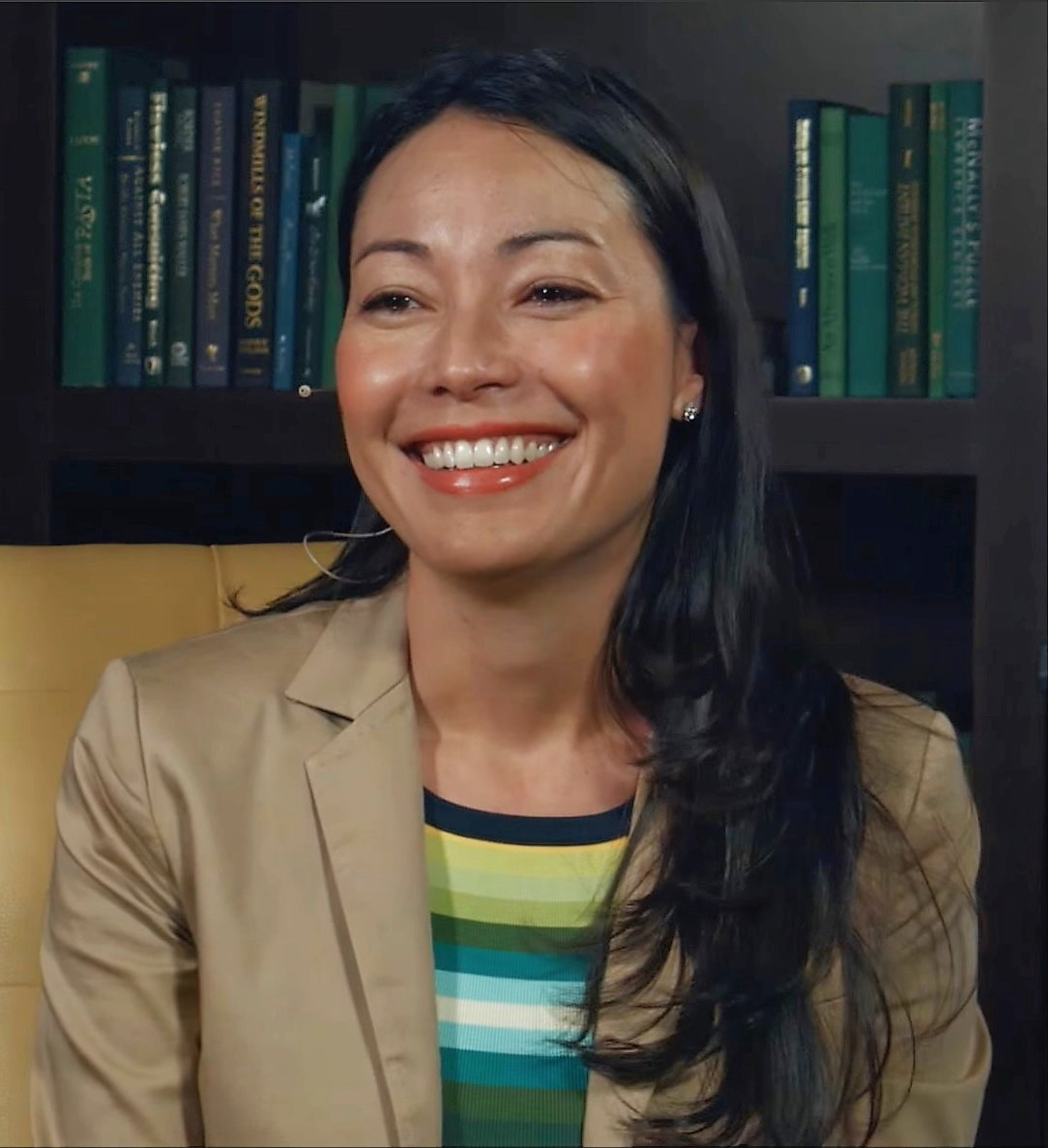
- Gascoigne in 2016
- Education: University of California, Davis
- Occupation: CEO of Girls in Tech
- Years active: 2005–present

Adriana Gascoigne is an American technology executive and activist, the founder and Chief Executive Officer of Girls in Tech, a global non-profit dedicated to empowering, educating, and mentoring women in the technology industry.

== Career ==
=== Early career ===
Gascoigne graduated from University of California, Davis with a bachelor's degree in Sociology and Economics. After graduating, Gascoigne served in a number of executive roles, including Vice President of Product Marketing for RxMatch, Chief Marketing Officer of QwikCart, Vice President of Digital for Ogilvy & Mather, and Vice President of Marketing for SecondMarket.

=== Girls in Tech ===
Adriana Gascoigne is the founder and CEO of Girls in Tech (GIT), a Nashville-based non-profit organization devoted to empowering, educating and engaging women in the tech industry. She started Girls in Tech in 2007 after noticing she was the only woman in a company of almost 50 people. She is also the author of Tech Boss Lady: How To Start-Up, Disrupt, And Thrive As A Female Founder, and a board member on WAPPP, Harvard Kennedy School's Women in Public Policy Program.
