= Adriana Marmorek =

Colombian artist (born 1969)

- Born: Adriana Marmorek; 1969 (age 56–57); Bogotá, Colombia
- Known for: Sculpture, Photography, Video and Installation.
- Awards: Luis Caballero Award for Contemporary Art
- Website: marmorek.wixsite.com/marmorek

Adriana Marmorek (born 1969) is a Colombian artist, exploring themes of desire through photography, video, installation and sculpture.

Marmorek has shown her work in Colombia, the United States, Argentina, Italy and Belgium, and some of her work is owned by the Museo de Arte Moderno in Cartagena de Indias. Marmorek was nominated for the 9th Luis Caballero Award for Contemporary Art in 2017.

She currently lives and works in Bogotá, Colombia.

== Early life and education ==
Adriana Marmorek was born in Bogotá, Colombia in 1969. She comes from a traditional and conservative family and studied at a catholic school.

She studied Social Communication at the Universidad Javeriana in Bogotá, Colombia from 1988 to 1992. Her visual arts career reflects some of her beginnings in the fields of television and publicity.

From 2004 to 2006 Marmorek received a Fine and Visual Arts master's degree at the Universidad Nacional in Colombia.

== Career ==
Marmorek developed her visual arts career as a sculptor and slowly expanded into other mediums such as photography, video and installation.

Using her knowledge of television and publicity, from her early studies, Marmorek developed a style of art in which she questions and challenges Colombia's conservative and timid views of sex and explores the concept of "Desire" and how human relationships, femininity, love, heartbreak and sexuality all relate to it.

From the start, Marmorek's work manifested an erotic nature. Through her first sculptures of twisted, contorted and multi-layered bronze figures that resembled a human body, the artist was able to embrace the conceptual style of art she is known for today.

She expanded beyond sculpture and delved into photography, video, and installation around 2006. In addition to these, she conceived a medium called "Architecture of Desire," which she uses to investigate the concepts of desire and pleasure through a thorough analysis of social, historical and erotic elements.

Marmorek explores human curiosity by adding elements to her artwork, such as peep-holes and mirrors, to force the viewer to be an active part of the work. Marmorek's work also forces the viewer to confront his or her own intimacy and become more open to one's own ideas of desire and sexuality.

=== Artwork ===
During the extent of her career, Marmorek has examined and worked with the theme of relationships and intimacy, for example, her 2009 exhibition "El Tocador" at LA Galeria in Colombia, consisted of 15 objects made up of used furniture, video and installation. All of them conveyed the ideas and reoccurring themes of eroticism while also questioning the supposed liberal views of sex today. For this particular exhibition, the artist examined, for two years and a half, the relationships between inanimate objects and the subject that uses it. Marmorek centers her interests in what goes on around this specific, feminine piece of furniture, the boudoir, and in one of the most intimate spaces, the bedroom between the lovers, and the self. Along with the boudoir or the "Tocador" she explores other pieces of furniture on which she projects sexual imagery of the body that complement this fantasy world between furniture and body that the artist had created for this exhibition.

Similar to the way she was exploring the relationship between objects and subjects in "El Tocador", her 2013 exhibition, "Ánima" explores the relationship between love and destruction and shows through mixed media how love and destruction go hand in hand. One of the main pieces in the show is influenced by Bosch's "Garden of Earthly Delights" Anima is a crystal urn like the one in the painting but instead of two lovers she places two thin, gold sheets that dance around each other touching, similarly to two lovers kissing and caressing each other. This motion does not go on forever and the two wear each other down and slowly destroy each other. Another piece in the show "Penelope- Where are you?" is a machine made of wood that finds and prints out any tweet that mentions the word "love" no matter the language. As the machine prints it, it also shreds it into thin pieces of paper. Both of these pieces convey love and destruction and show how one can not exist without the other.

After reading the novel The Human Stain by Philp Roth, in which the author talks about the dress Monica Lewinsky saves after her relationship with Bill Clinton, Adriana Marmorek began thinking about the many objects and gifts that came from past loves, and began documenting the object's history and examining how they reached such importance in someone's life. She spent over five years delved into the investigation of relationships between people and the memories that are left lingering in specific objects from past relationship and gathered over 51 objects that she refers to as "relics". The artist believes that there are powerful moments in every love story that, with the passing of time, start to seem unreal, these "Relics" or "Reliquias" are fragments from the past that remind the viewer that those magical moments did actually happen and although that relationship is over, there are still fragments left from it. The fact that these object hold such magical moments make it hard to dispose of them, the Colombian newspaper, El Tiempo, talks about how holding on to these objects affects the psychology of the individual. The artist wants people to see these as artifacts, hence why she calls them relics, and exhibits them in glass cases as if they were precious treasures. At the end of the exhibition, Marmorek decides to burn 12 of those "relics" during a ceremonial event. By burning the objects the artist allows the owner to be rid of that baggage that is affecting the individual's psychology while still honoring the object and the memories. The event was also recorded and photographed allowing for another exhibition in 2016, "Reliquias de amor" and "Háblame amor" in 2017.

== Public collections ==
Marmorek's work is owned by the Museo de Fotografía de Bogotá, Colombia; Museo de Arte Moderno, Cartagena de Indias, Colombia; and Ayala-Suárez Colección de Arte Latinoamericano, Buenos Aires, Argentina.

== Solo exhibitions ==
Marmorek's solo shows include:

"The Unspoken." - Remy Toledo Gallery, NY - 2006

"A través del espejo" - LA Galeria, Bogotá - 2007

"Habitación Propia" in In-situ and "Construcción Sensible" - Cámara de Comercio, Bogta - 2008

"El Tocador" - LA Galeria, Bogotá - 2009

"Punto Básico: Doble Nudo" - LA Galeria, Bogotá - 2011

"Desidium" - MUUA Colombia - 2013

"Anima" - La Galeria - 2013

"Aqua" - MAG3 Vienna, Austria - 2014

"Máquinas deseantes" Artbo - Nohra Haime Gallery - 2015

"Ensayos para Objetos de Deseo" - NH Galeria, Colombia - 2015

"AlterEGo" - Museum of Contemporary art, Bogotá - 2015

"Love Relics" - Nohra Haime Gallery, NY - 2016

"Love Relics" - Modern Art Museum, Bogotá - 2017

== Recent group exhibitions ==
Marmorek's group shows include:

"Máquina Deseante" - Galería Dos Casas, Bogotá - 2011.

"Tránsitos" - LIA, LA Galería, Bogotá - 2012

"Ellas Sí Hablan" - Galería Villa Manuela, Havana, Cuba - 2012

"La Luz" - Rojo Galería, Bogotá - 2012

"L'Essenza Di Tutte Le Cosse" - Primo Piano Livingallery, Lecce, Italy - 2012

"Infinitum cuerpo: de corrosiones y placeres" - Galería Espacio Alterno, Bogotá - 2013

"theRed," - MAG3, Vienna, Austria - 2013

"theRed" - Ruse Bulgaria (with Ruse Art Gallery) - 2014

"La Novia del Viento" - MUUA, Museo de la Universidad de Antioquía, Medellín - 2014

"theRed" - Galerie Lisi Hämmerle, Bregenz, Austria - 2014

"Dialogs with the Collection" - Museo de Arte Moderno de Bogotá, Colombia - 2015

"Abrahadabra" - Museo de Arte Contemporáneo de Bogotá, Colombia - 2015

"Mythologies" - Galería El Nogal, Bogotá - 2015

"Heroin" - Galería Nest, Bogotá,

ARCO Colombia, Curatorial Selection by Juan Andrés Gaitán, Madrid, Spain - 2015

"Dame un Beso, Kiss Me, Küss Mich" - Tatiana Pagés Gallery, New York - 2015

"Intimate Voices," - Museo Nacional de Colombia, Bogotá, Colombia - 2016

"Pasado Imperfecto" - NH Galería, Cartagena de Indias - 2016

"Schnabel, Muniz y Otras Obras Maestras" - NH Galería, Cartagena, Colombia, - 2016

"Obras en la Colección del Museo" - Museo de Arte Moderno de Cartagena, Colombia - 2016

"Medusas. Mujer Mito/Mujer Sombra" - MAC Museo de Arte Contemporaneo de Bogotá, Colombia - 2016

"Creative Tech Week NYC" - Hyphen Hub, New York, -2016

"Objetus" - NH Galería, Cartagena de Indias, Colombia - 2016

"Retrospective /10Years Mag3" - Mag3, Vienna, Austria - 2016

"El Trueque" - Rincon Projects, Bogotá - 2016

"Hagase la luz" - Fundacion Artnexus, Bogotá - 2017

"Dark and Stormy Night: The Gothic in Contemporary Art" - Lehman College Art Gallery, New York - 2017

"New Place, New Space" - Nohra Haime Gallery, New York - 2017

"FEMALE\FEMINIST/2017" - Lyme Academy College of Fine Arts, Old Lyme, CT - 2017

"2017 Hot New Pics" - Midwest Center for Photography, Wichita, KS - 2017

"Wealth" - LA galería, Bogotá, Colombia - 2017

"Feminist Feminine" - Nohra Haime Gallery, New York - 2017

"Visiones Algorítmicas" - NH Galería, Cartagena - 2017

== Publications ==
Adriana Marmorek: DESEO, Poética de la Seducción.

Adriana Marmorek: Love Relics.

Y EL AMOR...¿COMO VA?
