= Adriana Pichardo =

Venezuelan politician

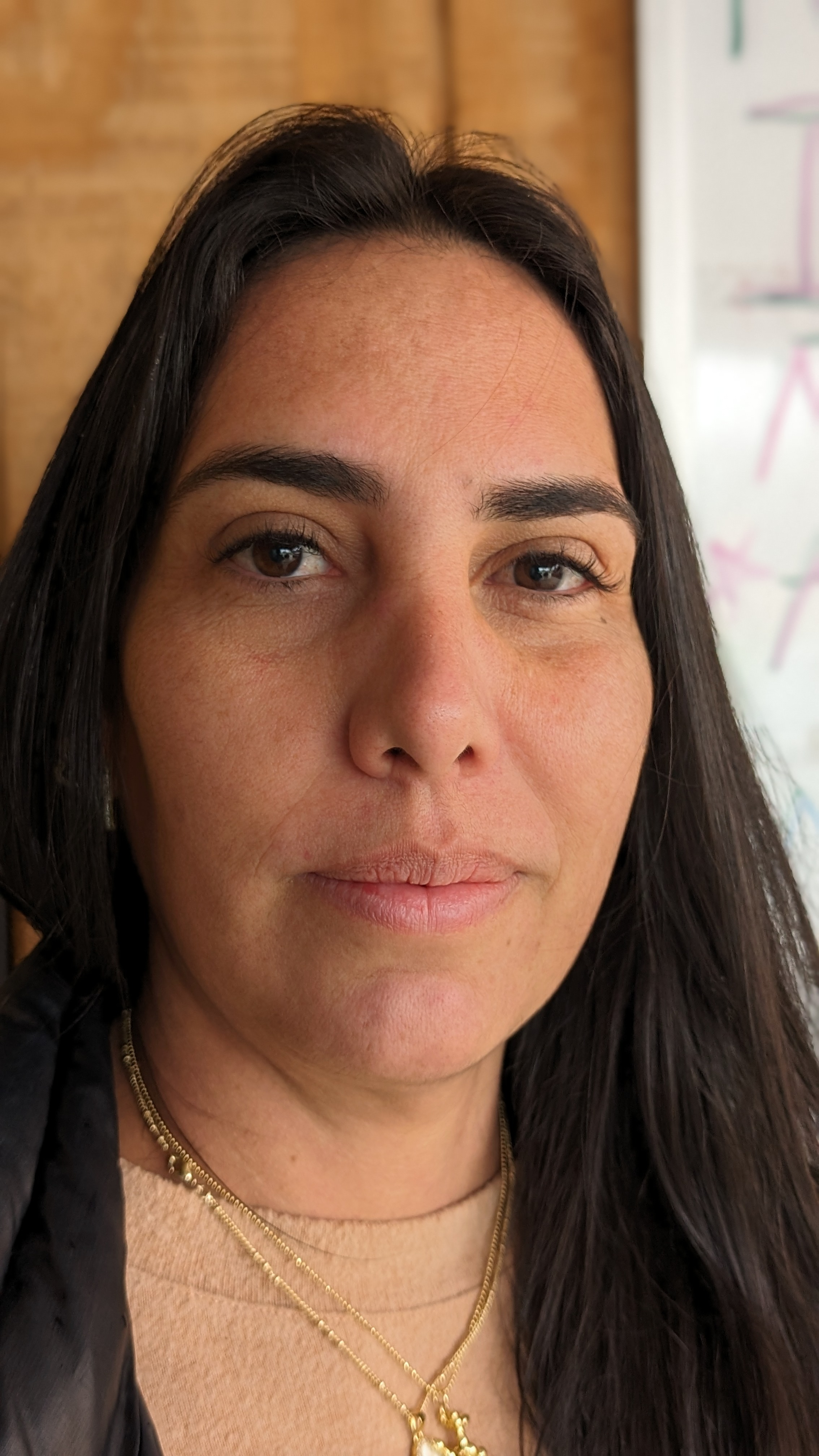

Alternate Deputy of the National Assembly for Aragua 4th District
- Incumbent
- Assumed office 5 January 2016

Deputy of the Mercosur Parliament representing Venezuela
- Incumbent
- Assumed office 3 February 2016

Personal details
- Party: Voluntad Popular
- Occupation: Politician

Adriana Pichardo Bello is a Venezuelan politician. She is a deputy of the National Assembly, representing District 4 of Aragua state as a member of Popular Will. She is also part of the Citizenship and Human Rights commission of Mercosur.

== Home infiltration ==
In the early hours of 15 October 2018, five heavily armed officers dressed in black entered her house without a search warrant. The troops were identified as members of the Bolivarian National Intelligence Service (SEBIN), but neighbors identified them as officials of the General Directorate of Military Counterintelligence (DGCIM) by the initials on uniforms and vehicles. A security guard at the building had asked for a search warrant, but the troops had threatened to kill him. Entering Pichardo's apartment, the troops asked her about Ricardo Antich, a soldier recently released after being accused of being part of the "Golpe Azul". Pichardo explained that she only knew his relatives, whom she has accompanied as part of her duty as a Mercosur parliamentarian to record all human rights violations within Venezuelan borders. She considered the invasion as a "flagrant violation" of her parliamentary immunity.
