= Adriana Petit =

Spanish artist (born 1984)

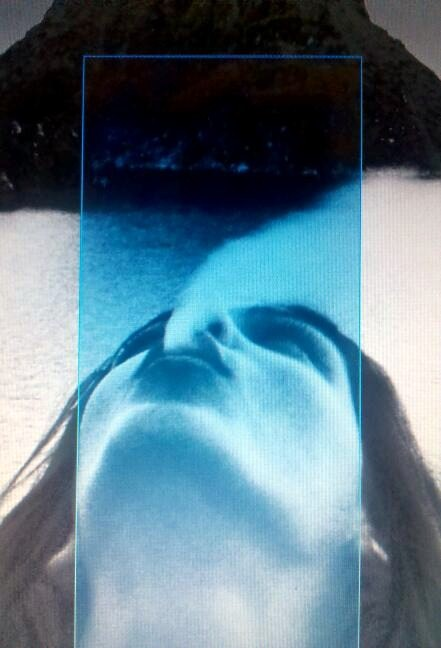
Petit in 2011

Adriana Petit (born 1984 in Palma de Mallorca) is a Spanish artist. Her main mediums of choice include photography, collage, music, writing and video. Nonetheless, her work is characterized by a predominance of content over medium, exploring the relationship between contraries from an autobiographical and deconstructionist point of view. The absence of academic training and the scarce institutional coverage contribute to locate her in the outskirts of the mainstream art context, and digital platforms like Tumblr, Flickr or YouTube are her usual exhibition channels. She has lived and worked at Madrid and Barcelona.

== Ruidos Salvajes ==
One of the reasons why in 2013 she went to live in Barcelona was the will to experience closely the emerging dark wave and punk scene that existed there, as it is explicited in the anthropological character of her photographic work of that period. But besides photography, she and Bernat from Orden Mundial decided to start a videographical documentation project under the moniker of Ruidos Salvajes (Spanish for "Wild Noises"), in which by the means of an homonymous YouTube channel they went on uploading an inventory of video recordings of concerts that mapped that scene. Bands like Belgrado, Una Bèstia Incontrolable, +++, Orden Mundial, ·Y·, Maquina Muerta, Crimen de Estado, Demonios Salvajes, Diät, Pena Máxima, COÀGUL, Pharmakon, Barcelona, Siega and Absurdo are part of the recordings of this platform, that ceased to exist when one year later Bernat left Barcelona and Adriana centered herself in other priorities.

== Musical projects ==
Starting during her time in Buenos Aires at age 19 and continuing in the cities where she subsequently lived, Adriana Petit worked on several short-term musical projects. Rather than functioning as conventional bands, these projects served as early drafts in developing her personal musical style and acted as a method of documenting her experiences through sound, reflecting the autobiographical themes present throughout her broader work.

=== Muso Fantasma ===
From 2007 to 2013, Adriana was part of a duo called Muso Fntasma, together with argentinian Pedro Amoidio from the band called Dios. Musically, Muso Fantasma is based in sound collage and spoken word, using samplers, effects, keyboards, electric guitar and industrial percussions. In 2009, they released a CD album called "Se puede bailar con los demonios pero siempre en actitud de fiesta" (Spanish for "You can dance with the demons but always in a party mood") on the Greek label More Mars, as the second instalment of the "Anarthria" series.

=== V ===
In 2013, Adriana started a post-punk band called "V", together with Rafa (from the bands Orden Mundial, Trance and Escorpio) and the artist Andrea Jarales, from which it only exists one video recording played live in a rehearsal room.

=== Esperit Maleït ===
Esperit Maleït (Catalan for "Cursed Spirit") was a sound and collage-installation art project developed by Adriana together with Andrea Jarales in an artist-in-residence program in the Catalan village of Moià, in the context of the Ex Abrupto 2014 Art Festival. By the means of manipulating words and sounds extracted from Moià's anthropological environment, Esperit Maleït was created just for the occasion and it was exclusively formalized in the shape of a tuned room and a concert.

=== Carne Roja ===
Carne Roja (Spanish for "Red Meat") was a musical project that Adriana started to develop solo along 2015. In a first stage Carne Roja consisted in single songs with an explicit neofolk approach that she uploaded at Bandcamp one by one, including a Death in June cover and a collaboration with Oriol Roca. After a short pause, during the same year she digitally published a first 6-track digital EP titled "Érase" (Spanish for "It was"), more noise-industrially oriented and with lyrics constructed from cut-ups from her own writings.

=== Mort Al Juny ===
In summer 2016, Adriana joined Mort Al Juny (Catalan for "Death in June") a project of videgraphical re-interpretations of Death in June songs in which Daniel Sedcontra and Marc O'Callaghan were working at the time. Adriana brought her aesthetics and audiovisual influence unto the project.

=== Adriana Petit ===
In a 2016 interview Adriana suggested that whenever Carne Roja got to the point of finding its own sound and being capable of playing live concerts, then it would cease to be called as it was and Adriana would start to use her own name. That first performance with her own name became real on 17 October 2016 at Freedonia venue in Barcelona, in the context of the second "Vigilar y Castigar" showcase commissioned by the Barcelonian label Cønjuntø Vacíø.

== Album covers ==
Some of Adriana Petit's photographies have been published as LP album covers, like that for the "I Can't Give You The Life You Want" compilation by the German label Blackest Ever Black or the one for the "Tot Encaixa!" album by Catalan musician Coàgul.
