= Adriana Guerrini =

Italian operatic soprano

Photo of Adriana Guerrini with 1947 dedication

Adriana Guerrini (22 September 1907 – 24 April 1970) was an Italian operatic soprano, particularly associated with the Italian repertory.

Guerrini initially studied with Elvira Cesaroli Salvatori but being dissatisfied, applied to Beniamino Gigli for advice and was directed to Roberto Giovannini, active at the Conservatorio di Santa Cecilia (Rome) but also at the famous "Scuola di arpe," directed by Isabella Rosati Caserini. After three years with Giovannini, she made her first operatic appearance in June 1935 at the Teatro Quattro Fontane (Rome) singing Musetta in La Boheme, along with other young people newly graduated from conservatory or private schools, including the young Giulio Neri, later one of Italy's premier bassos. After another Boheme in October of that year, Guerrini undertook a further year of study. In 1937 she had two concert appearances, and in July she appeared as Cio-cio-san in Madama Butterfly at the Teatro Italia (Rome), followed in October by her first performance on Italian radio (EIAR Rome). This was an Italian-language version of Charpentier's Louise; she sang two minor roles. The following year, 1938, Guerrini saw more regular activity, and it can be said that this year saw the beginning of her true career. Besides two concertos there were appearances in Rome (Traviata), Catanzaro (Iris), Frascati (Baronessa di Carini) and a notable (Andrea Chenier opposite Giuseppe Taccani), L'Aquila, and Pescara. She was now drawing very favorable notices. By year's end Guerrini had been contracted at fourteen secondary opera companies. The years 1939-1941 followed suit, and her last appearance in 1941 marked her first performance outside Italy; this was Barcelona, and a performance of Tosca.

May 1942 would see Guerrini's first appearance at a major house—Teatro Massimo (Palermo)—in La Forza del Destino and also in concert. In the same year Catania's famous Teatro Bellini also saw her in three performances, and at the EIAR's Rome studios she resumed her radio career with a concert and a Siberia conducted by Giordano, also a Tosca opposite Giacinto Prandelli. By 1943 Italy's tragic wartime curtailed Guerrini's activities, mostly confined to EIAR concerts and performances in Rome and Turin: Ballo in Maschera, Tosca, Andrea Chenier (Giordano, cond.), Gloria, Il Tabarro. Co-interpreters included Beniamino Gigli, Galliano Masini, Mario Borriello, Armando Borgioli, Piero Pauli, and Giovanni Inghilleri.

In 1944 she appeared at the Teatro dell'Opera di Roma in Andrea Chenier, Ballo in Maschera, Madama Butterfly, and Forza del Destino. By now she was an established and highly esteemed performer. Her greatest triumphs occurred in 1945-1948 at the Teatro San Carlo in Naples, where she sang in Ballo in maschera, Forza del destino, Cavalleria rusticana, Tosca, Madama Butterfly, Traviata, Manon, Manon Lescaut, Faust, Mefistofele, Miseria e Nobilta`, La Boheme, Falstaff, and Trovatore. She also won considerable acclaim in the title role in Gluck's Iphigénie en Aulide, and as Octavian in Der Rosenkavalier. During the celebration of Verdi's 50th death anniversary in 1951, she sang on Italian radio the role of Amalia in I masnadieri.

Outside Italy, she made guest appearances at the Teatro Tivoli (Barcelona), the Coliseu dos Recreios (Lisbon), the Teatro Municipal (Caracas), the Royal Festival Hall and the Albert Hall (London), and the Wiener Konzerthaus (Vienna)

A lyric-dramatic soprano of stature, she can be heard in complete recordings of La traviata, La forza del destino, and Tosca.

== Sources ==
Giorgio Feliciotti, Adriana Guerrini: Una Voce che Ritorna

- Operissimo.com
