= Adriana de Barros =

Canadian artist and poet

Adriana Aleixo Pereira de Barros (born 1976) is a Portuguese and Canadian illustrator, web designer, and poet.

Since 1999, de Barros has created visual poems that combine various disciplines: writing, designing and drawing, sound editing, and filmmaking (through the use of new media, Flash software). Her visual poems have been screened at the American festivals Flashbang! and Flashbang 4 (2001 and 2002), The. ME.Project. (2002; showcased in Toronto, New York and Los Angeles). Her work has appeared in art/poetry books and websites. De Barros has been recognized for "trying to make poetry more dynamic and accessible." Her creations exist, as she states, "so that even someone who may dislike poetry can enjoy it visually."

De Barros designs and illustrates at her own studio, Breathewords. She is also founder and editor of Scene 360, a non-profit online film and arts magazine. Since 2000, it has featured interviews and profiles of leading web designers, artists, and filmmakers.

== Biography ==
Born in Caldas da Rainha, Portugal, de Barros moved to Toronto at the age of three. As a child she was interested in sports, and only when she was twelve did she realize her interest in drawing. At age fifteen, her family decided to move back to her birthplace, where de Barros faced cultural challenges with her education and lifestyle.

In high school she studied art and design, ultimately deciding to pursue cinema in college. Upset with the lack of sophistication within the film schools and film industry in Portugal, she believed that Toronto "would have been a better location to pursue cinema than in Portugal." She wishes to one day have the opportunity to study filmmaking in North America. Out of high school, she began working temporarily for her family's clothing business. The experience led to a full-time job as a fashion and advertising designer for the company, as well as co-running a copy center with design section.

In 1999, de Barros began web design and programming. She mentions finding her place online by "combining various art forms into each project". The Internet providing non-geographical boundaries and ease for de Barros to write and create English language projects. She began with exploration in frame-by-frame Flash visual poems. She founded an online film and arts magazine, Scene 360, where she wrote film and art analyses and profiled creative individuals.

De Barros is self taught. Today, she still runs her copy center, as she designs in her studio. She is principal and creative director of Breathewords.com. Her work encompasses various media from hand-painted illustrative magazine covers to e-commerce and wacky Flash sites for poets (e.g. HotEmuluv).

== Works ==
=== Visual poetry ===
De Barros' interactive narratives and poems have been showcased at design and Flash festivals, and screened on the Internet on places like poemsthatgo, K10k, and online art gallery Lumen Eclipse.

=== Illustration style and technique ===
Her practice "revolves around issues of daily life, human psychology analysis and colour, and imaginary and surrealist envisionment." She enjoys painting portraits of people with distinguishing facial expressions. Motifs present in her artwork include hands, angel wings, butterflies, and animals.

De Barros' prominent style "intentionally leaves portions of her pieces unfinished or with imperfections." She draws inspiration from a variety of sources, from the Golden Age of Cinema to Renaissance works (e.g. unfinished sketches by Leonardo da Vinci). Her creative process is noted for its clear deviation from a fine artist or cartoon animator, because it often begins with writing—inspired by a theme, song, daily life interpretation—and then composed into a visual.

De Barros' painting technique ranges from acrylic only to using mixed media with watercolor, color pencils, spray paint, and collage.

=== Multimedia ===
De Barros's web designs in both Flash and static media (CSS and HTML) have been featured with design excellence in "HOW's Top Ten Links (2003, USA), Web Designing (April 2003, Japan), Taschen's 1000 Favorite Websites (2003, Germany), STEP Inside Design (Issue May/June 2004, USA). She won a Portuguese Multimedia II Award (2005), two SXSW Web Awards nominations (2003 and 2004) a nomination in the 17th Stuttgart Filmwinter New Media Award (2004)." American Institute of Graphic Arts's (AIGA, Cincinnati) has noted her work with a Top Design Site Award, MSN.com with a Site of the Week and Yahoo! a New and Notable mention.

De Barros is also involved in the design industry, having led a speaker/workshop session about the behind-the-scenes work on her visual poems and films at the OFFF04 convention held in Valencia, Spain. She has continued to do lectures about web design at universities in Portugal.

== Interviews ==
- Poetry from Portugal - H2O Magazine
- Web Gurus Interviews - Erudition
