= Adriana González Carrillo =

Mexican politician

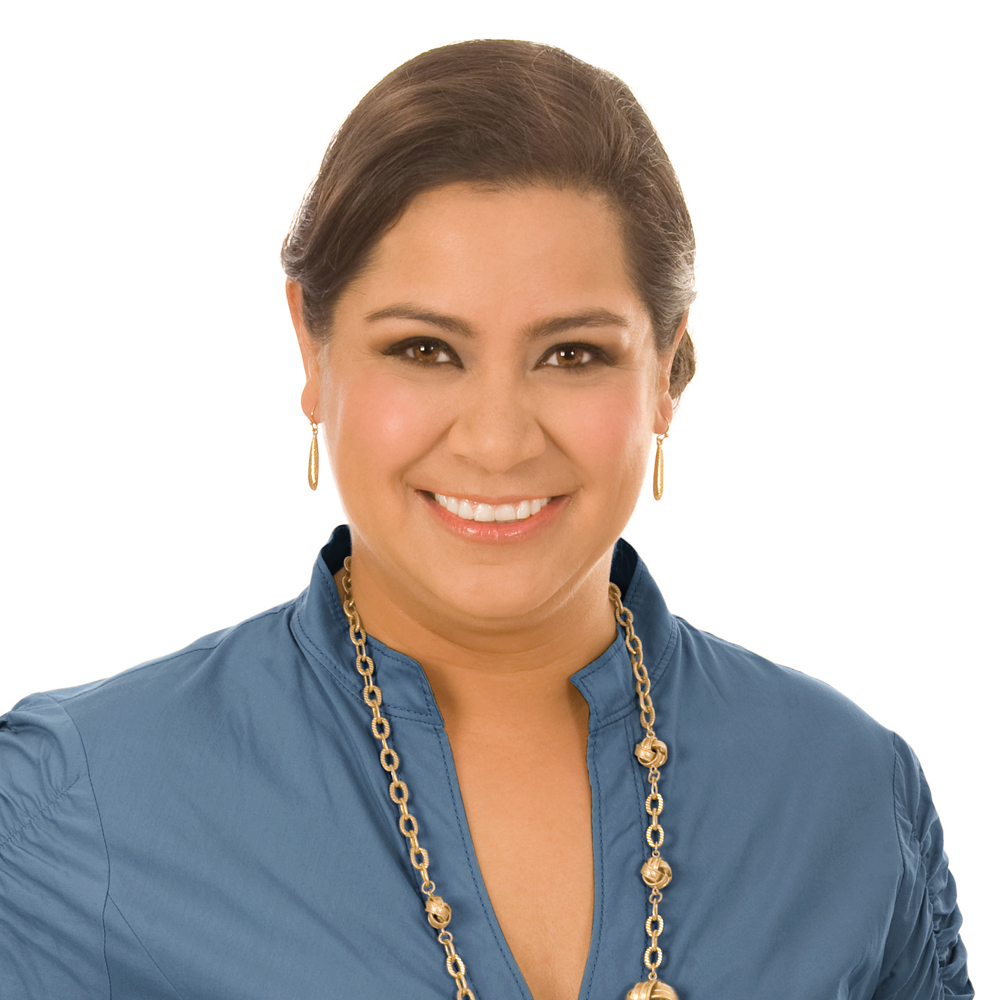
- Carrillo in 2011
- Born: 16 March 1975 (age 51); Mexico City, Mexico
- Education: Instituto Tecnológico Autónomo de México
- Occupations: Deputy and Senator
- Political party: PAN
- Website: www.adrianagonzalez.org.mx

Adriana González Carrillo (born 16 March 1975) is a Mexican politician who affiliated with the PAN. As of 2013, she served as Deputy of both the LIX and LXII Legislatures of the Mexican Congress representing the State of Mexico. She also served as Senator of the LX and LXI Legislatures.
