= Adriana Cancino =

Chilean teacher and politician

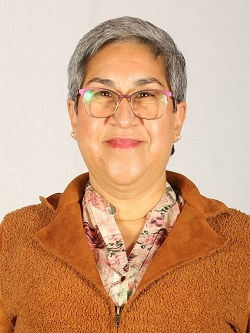

Member of the Constitutional Convention
- In office 4 July 2021 – 4 July 2022
- Constituency: 16th District

Personal details
- Born: 22 June 1962 (age 63) Nancagua, Chile
- Occupation: Teacher

Adriana Cancino Meneses (born 22 June 1962) is a Chilean teacher and independent politician.

She served as a member of the Constitutional Convention, representing the 16th District of the O'Higgins Region. She coordinated the Preamble Commission.

== Biography ==
Cancino was born on 22 June 1962 in Placilla, near San Fernando, O'Higgins Region. She is the daughter of José Domingo Segundo Cancino Salinas and María Adriana Meneses Orellana.

She completed her primary and secondary education at the British College of San Fernando and qualified as a teacher.

Between 1997 and 2001, she worked as a teacher in the city of Rancagua, particularly at Colegio Infantes de O'Higgins. Since 2011, she has served as the teacher in charge of the CRA (School Resource Center) at Escuela Básica F-461 in Cunaco.

== Political activity ==
Cancino is an independent politician. Since 2016, she has been a member of the Agrupación de la Discapacidad de Nancagua, where she serves as secretary.

In the elections held on 15–16 May 2021, she ran as an independent candidate for the Constitutional Convention representing the 16th District of the O'Higgins Region, in a quota of the Socialist Party as part of the Lista del Apruebo pact.

She obtained 3,731 votes, corresponding to 2.63% of the valid votes cast, and entered the Convention through the gender parity mechanism.
