= Adriana van Tongeren =

Dutch actress

Adriana von Tongeren
- Born: ca. 1691; Amsterdam, Dutch Republic
- Died: 13 April 1764 (aged 72–73); Amsterdam, Dutch Republic
- Occupation: Actress
- Spouse: Jan Hendrik Jordaan

Adriana van Tongeren (ca. 1691, Amsterdam – 13 April 1764, Amsterdam), was a Dutch stage actress.

Her parentage is unknown. She married in October 1714 in Delfshaven to actor Jan Hendrik Jordaan (ca. 1683–1749). Their marriage produced two daughters and six sons, three of the sons dying young.

She was active at the Amsterdam Theater from 1717 to 1744, and continued to make guest appearances as late as 1762. She was the leading actress of Amsterdam in her time.

She was the mentor of Adriana Maas, who replaced her as the theatre's leading actress in the 1730s.

== Sources ==
- http://www.inghist.nl/Onderzoek/Projecten/DVN/lemmata/data/Tongeren
