= Adriana Ventura =

Brazilian politician (born 1969)

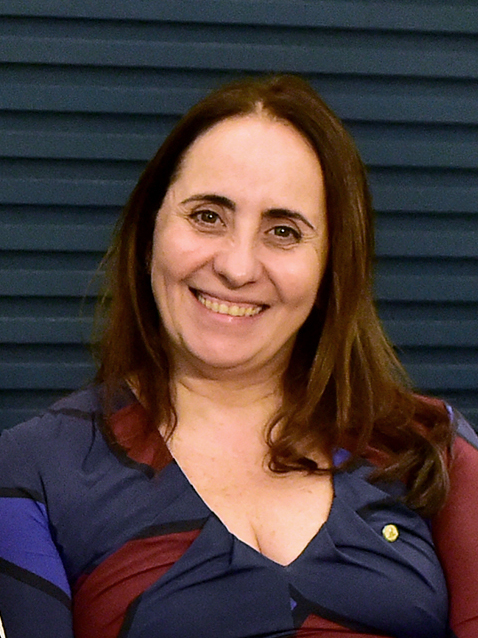
- Ventura in 2025

Member of the Chamber of Deputies
- Incumbent
- Assumed office 1 February 2019
- Constituency: São Paulo

Personal details
- Born: Adriana Miguel Ventura; 6 March 1969 (age 57) São Paulo, Brazil
- Party: NOVO (since 2017)
- Education: Fundação Getulio Vargas
- Website: adrianaventura.com

Adriana Miguel Ventura (born 6 March 1969) is a Brazilian politician serving as a member of the Chamber of Deputies since 2019. She has been a professor of management and entrepreneurship at the Escola de Administração de Empresas de São Paulo since 2005.
