= Adriana Kaplan Marcusán =

Argentine anthropologist

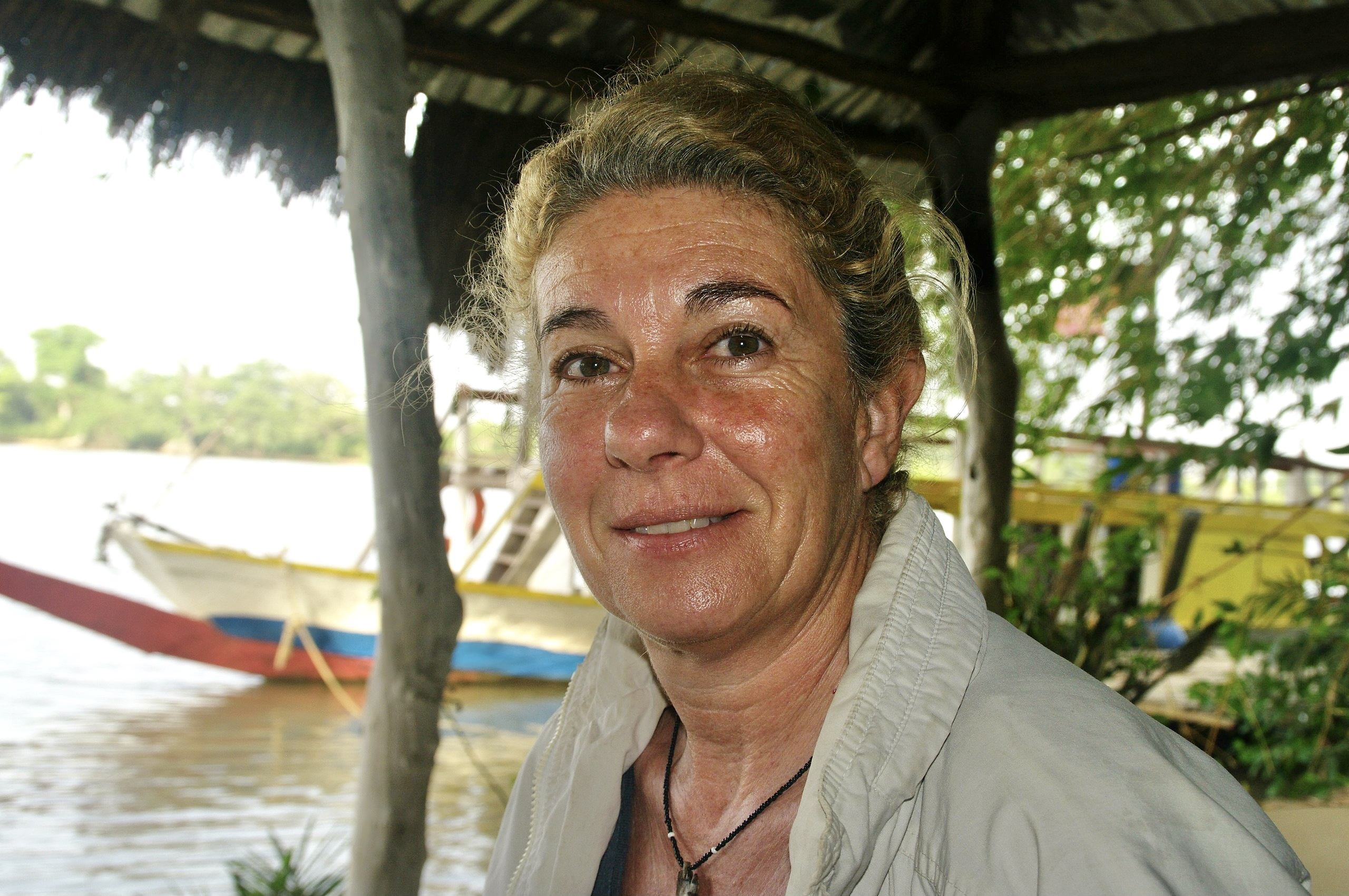
- Born: December 19, 1956 (age 69)
- Occupations: Director of the NGO Wassu Gambia Kafo (WGK) and the Wassu Foundation of the Autonomous University of Barcelona

Adriana Kaplan Marcusán (Buenos Aires, 19 December 1956) is an Argentine anthropologist and Director of the NGO Wassu Gambia Kafo (WGK) and the Wassu Foundation of the Autonomous University of Barcelona. She is expert in sexual and reproductive health with a focus on the prevention of female genital mutilation (FGM).

== Biography ==
Adriana Kaplan Marcusán was born in Buenos Aires on 19 December 1956. She is a professor of Anthropology of Health at the Autonomous University of Barcelona, Executive Director of the NGO Wassu Gambia Kafo and the Wassu Foundation of the Autonomous University of Barcelona (UAB) and Director of the Chair Knowledge Transfer.

She has been working in the Gambia, Senegal and Guinea Bissau since 1989 studying sexual and reproductive health, focusing on the prevention of female genital mutilation (FGM).

She leads the Transnational Observatory of Applied Research to New Strategies for the Prevention of Female Genital Mutilation/Cutting (FGM/C) hosted by the Wassu-UAB Foundation, (5)?? with two research and training centres: in Spain, the Interdisciplinary Group for the Prevention and Study of Harmful Traditional Practices (IGPS/HTP) at the Department of Social and Cultural Anthropology in the UAB; in The Gambia, the local NGO Wassu Gambia Kafo.

She has been a collaborating researcher of the Gambia Medical Research Council, adviser to the Women's Bureau and consultant for various international agencies (UNFPA, UNDP, UNICEF, EU). In Spain, she advises, trains and collaborates with institutions to plan and implement FGM care and prevention programs.

She is a member of the Women's Shura Council in New York, the Committee of Experts on FGM at the World Health Organization in Geneva and the European Institute for Gender Equality (EIGE) in Vilnius.

== Published works ==
Among her publications are various articles, books and training guides and material. She also directed four documentaries Gambia: Ciclo vital y supervivencia (Gambia, life cycle and survival) (1991), Initiation without cutting (2004), that provides an alternative methodological proposal for the prevention of FGM, translated into five local languages, at the request of the Vice Presidency of The Gambia, Brufut Declaration (2009), and A future without mutilation (2013), which collects the testimonies of health professionals, students, traditional midwives, circumcisers, community and religious leaders.

== Awards and distinctions ==
- 1998 X Award Rogeli Duocastella in Social Sciences, "la Caixa" Foundation.
- 2003 Excellence in Research Grant Ramón y Cajal, Spanish Ministry of Education and Science.
- 2005 Women for Women Distinction, Barcelona
- 2008 International Navarre Prize for Solidarity, Government of Navarre
- 2008 Award for the best oral communication, VII Workshop on Social Security Primary Health Teams, Espulgas de Llobregat, Barcelona
- 2008 Esteve Laboratories Award for the best oral communication, II Congress of the Valencian, Balearic and Catalan Societies of Family and Community Medicine
- 2008 Nestlé Award for the best oral communication, XXII National Congress of the Spanish Society of Extra-hospital Paediatrics and Primary Care, Tenerife
- 2009 Chair of Knowledge Transfer, Parc de Recerca-UAB Santander.
- 2014 Award for the Fight against FGM/C for the International Day for the Elimination of Violence, Spanish Ministry of Health, Social Services and Equality.
- 2017 Memorial Lluís Companys: Award for Trajectory fighting against gender violence and FGM, Irla Foundation.
- 2017 IV DKV Awards Medicine & Solidarity: Award to the Trajectory, DKV.
- 2018 Global Woman Awards 2018: Advocacy category, Global Woman P.E.A.C.E. Foundation.
