= Adriana Castelán Macías =

Mexican politician

- Born: 21 February 1983 (age 43); Veracruz, Mexico
- Occupation: Politician
- Political party: PRI

Adriana Refugio Castelán Macías (born 21 February 1983) is a Mexican politician from the Institutional Revolutionary Party. From 2010 to 2012 she served as Deputy of the LXI Legislature of the Mexican Congress representing Veracruz.
