= University of Nariño =

Coordinates: 1°14′03″N 77°17′07″W

- Universidad de Nariño
- Latin: Vniversitas Stvdiorvm Nariñenses
- Motto: Tantvm possvmvs qvantvm scimvs
- Motto in English: We possess as much as we know
- Type: Public, Departmental
- Established: November 4, 1904
- Affiliations: ASCUN, Universia
- Rector: Carlos Solarte Portilla
- Academic staff: 676
- Students: 9,867
- Undergraduates: 8,781
- Postgraduates: 1,086
- Doctoral students: 10
- Location: Pasto, Nariño, Colombia
- Campus: Torobajo, 137,591 m^{2} (33.999 acres) Panamericana, 38,071 m^{2} (9.408 acres) Urban
- Colours: Green, Yellow, and Red
- Nickname: Udenar
- Website: www.udenar.edu.co

The University of Nariño (Spanish: Universidad de Nariño), also called Udenar, is a public, coeducational, research university based primarily in the city of Pasto, Nariño, Colombia. It is the largest higher education institution by student population in the department with 9,867 students. Its origins can be traced to 1712, but it was officially established by governor Julian Buchelli through decree 049 of November 7, 1904.

The university has three campuses in Pasto. The main one, known as the University City of Torobajo, is located in the northern part of the city in the neighborhood of the same name, the second in the neighborhood of San Vicente is known as the Panamericana campus, and the last is in the city's downtown, which was its first location. Udenar has several satellite campuses across the department in the cities of Ipiales, Samaniego, Tumaco, and Tuquerres. The university offers education at technological, undergraduate and postgraduate levels, with 56 academic programs, which includes 5 master's and a doctorate in education. It is also the host for 79 research groups recognized by COLCIENCIAS.

The university is member of the Association of Colombian Universities (ASCUN) and the Iberoamerican University Network Universia.

== Organization ==
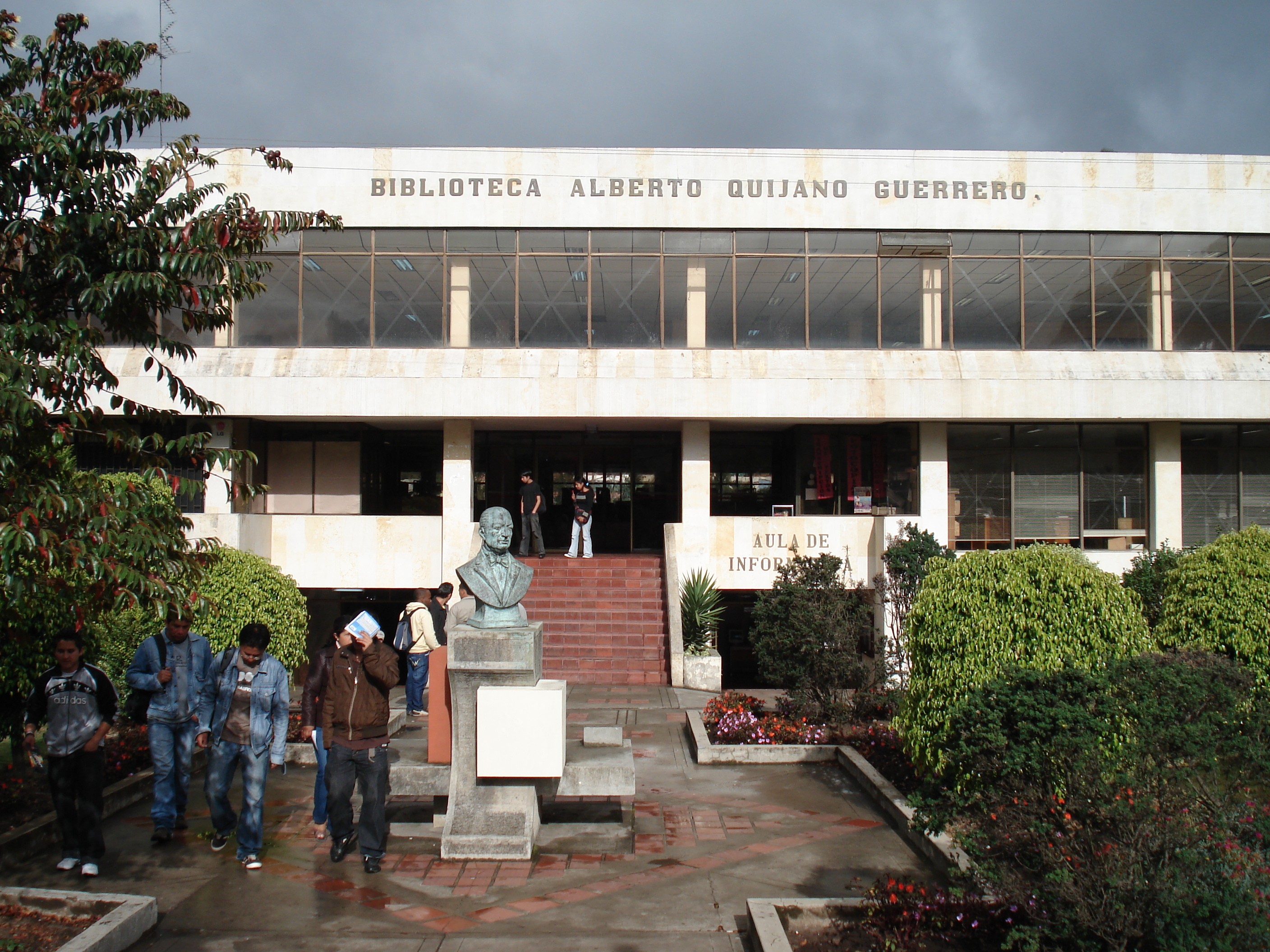
Alberto Quijano Guerrero Library

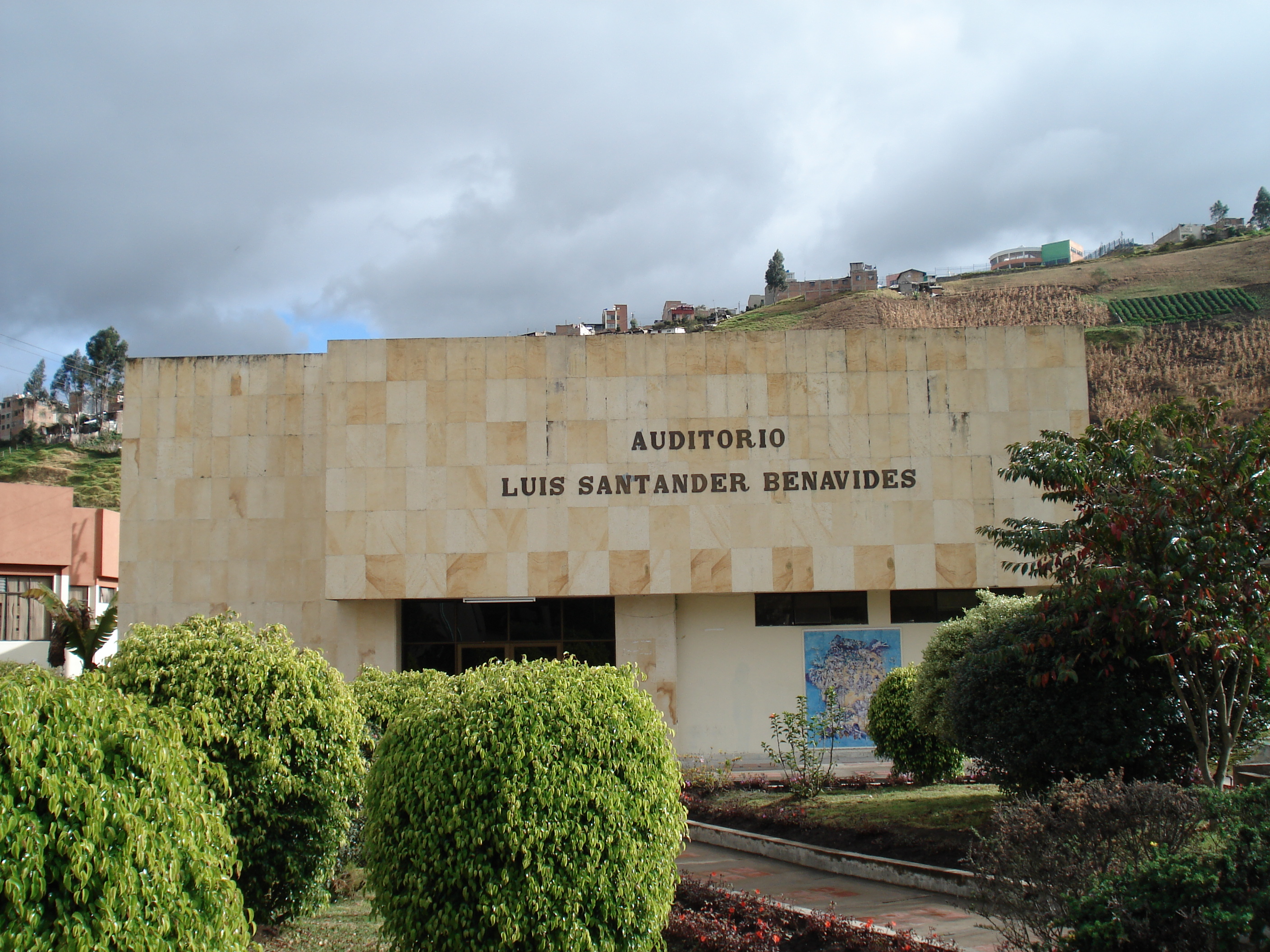
Luis Santander Benavides Auditorium

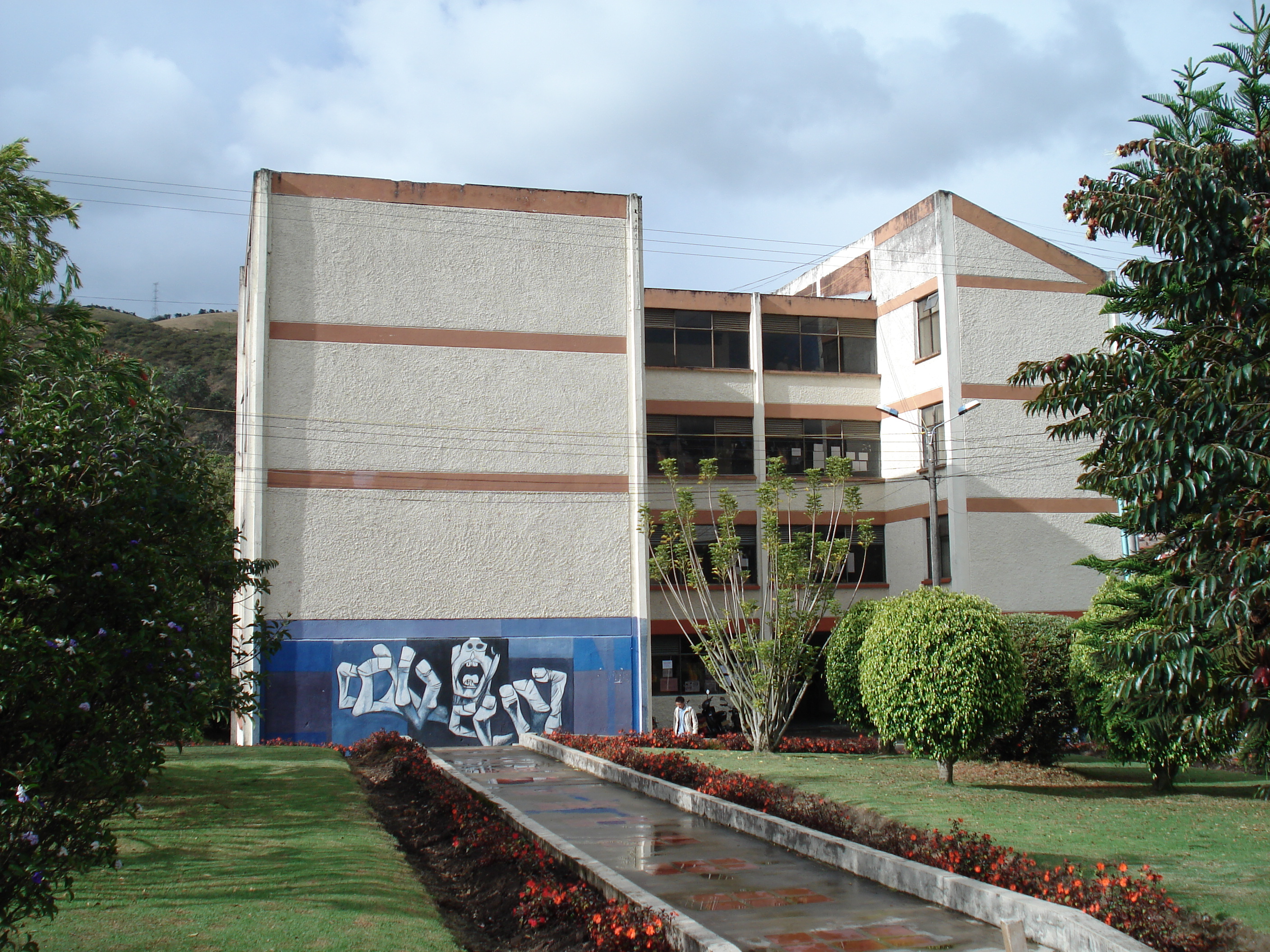
School of Economics

The university highest government body is the University Council which is formed of twelve members: the governor of Nariño, the rector, the general secretary, and representatives for the President of the Republic, the Ministry of Education, deans, professors, alumni, students, former rectors, the productive sector and the governor of the department. The rector is the chief executive officer and is elected for a four-year period with the possibility of reelection. The current rector is Silvio Sánchez Fajardo, who started his term in 2007.

Udenar is organized in eleven faculties: Agricultural Sciences, Agroindustrial Engineering, Arts, Economics and Administration Sciences, Education, Engineering, Health, Human Sciences, Law, Natural Sciences and Mathematics, and Husbandry Sciences.

== See also ==
- List of universities in Colombia
