= Adriana Hinojosa Céspedes =

Mexican politician

- Born: 10 April 1972 (age 54); Mexico City, Mexico
- Occupation: Politician
- Political party: PAN

Adriana de Lourdes Hinojosa Céspedes (born 10 April 1972) is a Mexican politician from the National Action Party. From 2009 to 2012 she served as Deputy of the LXI Legislature of the Mexican Congress representing the State of Mexico.
