= Adriana Brodsky =

Argentine actress and vedette

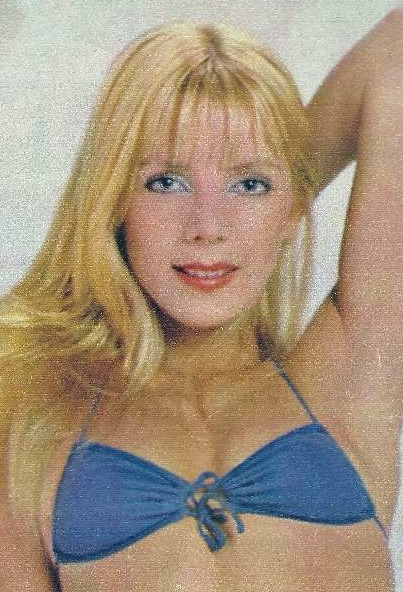
- Born: December 22, 1955 (age 70); Buenos Aires

Adriana Mónica Brodsky (Spanish pronunciation: [aˈðɾjana ˈβɾoðski]), alias La Bebota (Buenos Aires, December 22, 1955) is an Argentine actress and vedette.

She has worked along with Jorge Porcel and especially with Alberto Olmedo, hence being known as one of the "Girls of Olmedo".

== Filmography ==
- Se acabó el curro (1983)
- Los matamonstruos en la mansión del terror (1987)
- El manosanta está cargado (1987)

== Television ==
- "Operación Ja-Já" (1981–1982)
- "No toca botón" (1986–1987)
- "Las gatitas y ratones de Porcel" (1988)
- "Palermo Hollywood Hotel" (2006)
- "Mitos, crónicas del amor descartable" (2009)
- "El parador" (2008–2010)

== Theatre ==
- "La noche está que arde" (1987)
- "La noche está que arde" (1989)
- "¿Será virgen mi marido?" (2000)
- "Reid mortales... el humor es sagrado" (2001)
- "¿Será virgen mi marido?" (2008)
- "Ariel y los hechiceros del caribe" (2009)
- "El glamour de San Luis" (2009)
- "Feliz caño nuevo" (2010)
- "Hechiceros del caribe" (2010)
- "Hasta las lolas" (2010)
- "La revista de San Luis" (2011)
