= Adriana Degreas =

Brazilian fashion designer

- Born: 20 April 1971; São Paulo, Brazil
- Occupation: Fashion designer
- Label: Adriana Degreas

Adriana Degreas (born April 20, 1971) is a Brazilian fashion designer. She is particularly known for swimwear and resort wear. Degreas's business is based in São Paulo. While her work sells internationally, in 2018, it was reported that 73% of sales occur within Brazil. She has collaborated on beachwear collections with other designers such as Charlotte Olympia and Cult Gaia.
