= Adrianna Freeman =

American singer-songwriter

- Born: Adrianna Freeman
- Origin: Tallahassee, Florida, United States
- Genre: Country
- Occupation: Singer-songwriter
- Instruments: Singing, acoustic guitar
- Years active: 2001–present
- Labels: AFM Entertainment, Inc.
- Website: www.adriannafreeman.com/ Adrianna Freeman discography at MusicBrainz

Adrianna Freeman is an American singer-songwriter who specializes in country music and Americana. She recorded her first album, Either You Do or You Don't, in 2012.

== Biography ==
Freeman was born on a plantation in Tallahassee, Florida, the daughter of a sharecropper and musician named Ed Freeman, who was a fan of country music. Thus, she grew up listening to country music on her father's radio, dreaming of one day singing like some of the classic singers she idolized, such as Dolly Parton, Patsy Cline and Loretta Lynn. In addition to singing, she plays guitar and mandolin, and composes many of her own songs.

Freeman's first performance came at the age of 8, for customers at her family's produce market. When she was 15, her father took her to perform for the first time in a local country music honky-tonk. As a teenager, Freeman traveled overseas with the missionary organization Teen Mania, where she performed for the poor in Russia. An experience involving a child speaking for the first time following one Freeman's performances taught her the healing and joy her voice could bring to others.

After returning to the United States, Freeman attended Florida State University in Tallahassee, where she earned a degree in accounting. However, music remained her primary interest, so she moved to Nashville to pursue a musical career.

Like many singers just starting out, Freeman performed in many small clubs and struggled to get noticed. One day, while recording in a Nashville studio, she met Teddy Gentry, co-founder of the Grammy-winning country music super-group Alabama, who happened to be at the studio on other business. Impressed with Freeman's singing, Gentry invited her to record a song for Teddy Gentry's Best New Nashville, an album that he was producing for Cracker Barrel Old Country Store, a restaurant chain that is popular in the South and the Midwest. Cracker Barrel customers who purchased the album voted Freeman's song, Run Baby Run, as their favorite selection on the album.

Following the success of Teddy Gentry's Best New Nashville, Gentry agreed to produce Freeman's debut album, which would be titled Either You Do or You Don't. The album was recorded at the Tracking Room/OmniSound Studios in Nashville.

With no record deal on the horizon, Adrianna and family traveled to Ponte Vedra, FL to meet with Stephen Wrench, President of Musik and Film Records. Wrench was so impressed with Adrianna's voice, he agreed to sign her with Musik and Film Records in August 2012. An immediate campaign was begun by the promotions division, Musik Radio to thousands of stations around the world, which led her to be found on Cashbox charts for weeks. Adrianna was especially well received in Europe and Australia with British radio host Brian Clough describing the album as "sheer class...an eclectic mix of light and shade of mid tempo and gentle songs which shows off (Freeman's) vocal range and quality." Black Grooves, a publication of the Archives of African American Music and Culture, wrote, "Freeman’s winsome voice may just take her down the road to country stardom."

In the spring of 2013, Freeman formed AFM Entertainment, Inc., and released her first project on that label, a single titled Just A Girl. The song, which deals with children growing up in broken homes, was adopted as the official them song of The National Network for Youth (NN4Y) in Washington, D.C., the largest nonprofit organization in the U.S. serving the needs to homeless and runaway youth. An accompanying music video, produced by film students at Florida State University, was featured on NN4Y’s website. A story about the song appeared on The 700 Club, a program on the Christian Broadcasting Network (CBN).

Freeman continues to tour and record, and has said that she plans to release another project early in 2014.

== Quotes ==
- "The passion in Adrianna's voice reminds me of Tammy Wynette, one of my favorite female singers in all of Country music. She had a lot of drive and energy and the tenacity to hang in through the difficult times" – Teddy Gentry
- "Florida native Adrianna Freeman does a lovely job on Run Baby Run, and along with trio 3 Lanes Crossing, could very well be the vocal finds of this disc. Freeman breezes through her track effortlessly" – Chuck Dauphin senior editor for Billboard Magazine
- "Glorious, Old Wounds by Adrianna Freeman" – Hardeep Singh Kohli BBC Radio 2
- "One of the freshest sounds in country music, I can see a big future for Adrianna" – Brian Clough (CMA International Country Broadcaster 2009)
- "Lovely song, I love that gentler side of her music" – Marie Crichton BBC Radio Shropshire
