= Adriana Gaviria =

American actor, producer, director, and writer

- Born: New York, New York, U.S.
- Education: Florida International University (BFA); Yale School of Drama (MFA)
- Occupations: Actor, producer, director, writer, advocate

Adriana Gaviria is an actor, producer, director, writer, and advocate in the United States. She is a founding member and artistic producer of The Sol Project, a national initiative to support Latinx theater, and the founder and producing artistic director for North Star Projects, an arts initiative that supports independent artists and theaters. Her advocacy also includes leadership roles with the Parent Artist Advocacy League (PAAL).

== Early life and education ==
Adriana Gaviria was born in New York City and raised in Miami, Florida. She graduated from Florida International University (FIU) and pursued her acting career at the Yale School of Drama. She received a BFA from FIU and a MFA from the Yale School of Drama.

Gaviria is a former recipient of the Los Angeles Theatre Center (LATC)/Andrew W. Mellon Foundation Artistic Leaders Fellowship. After applying for an artistic leadership fellowship in LA, Gaviria was inspired to create change in New York City, including by advocating and producing for the Latinx theatre community.

== Career ==
=== Theatre ===
Gaviria has performed in classical and contemporary works in many theaters across the nation, including the Yale Repertory Theatre, Syracuse Stage, Dallas Theater Center, Denver Center for the Performing Arts, Arizona Theatre Company, Pasadena Playhouse, Marin Theatre Company, Alabama Shakespeare Festival and the Chicago Shakespeare Theater. As a theater producer, her work includes Amparo the Experience, Frankie and Johnny In The Claire De Lune, and a virtual reading of Borrowed, with fellow producers William Fernandez and George Cabrera, as well as a virtual reading of Jenna and the Whale produced with Fernandez, Jim Kierstead, and Conor Bagley. She has also worked as the Virtual Technical Director for online productions of Two Sisters and a Piano and Jericho.

=== Film ===
Gaviria played the lead role of Myra in the 2006 short film, Sueños. The film, directed by Rio Puertollano, was produced by Dreamriver Productions and tells the story of two addicts struggling to survive in the New York City district of Washington Heights. Gaviria later played the lead of Camilla, a young Brazilian mother, in the short, You and I, Always (2019), directed by Ellen Marmol.

Gaviria was the assistant director for the short films, Tamarind (2008) and Broken Wings (2011). She was a producer for Broken Wings and an associate producer for the web series Doin' Great. Gaviria has also worked in the makeup and hairstyling departments for Tamarind and The Bakery (2004).

=== Television ===
In 2009, Gaviria saw her television breakout with her co-star role as Lucy Valdez in Law & Order: Criminal Intent. She would later co-star on CBS's Person of Interest as Christina Rojas in 2011.

=== Advocacy ===
Gaviria is the founder and producing artistic director for North Star Projects, an arts initiative that partners with artists, cultural leaders, organizations, and theaters around the country to help support independent artists and theater organizations. In 2020, Gaviria was a producer of a virtual reading of Jenna and the Whale that was also a fundraising activity for North Star Projects and the Sol Project.

She is also a founding member, artistic producer, and SolFest producer for The Sol Project, a national theater initiative launched in 2016 to support Latinx theater. The Sol Project operates out of New York City and works with Off-Broadway companies to stage productions for Latinx playwrights at various points in their careers. In 2016, Sol Project artistic director Jacob Padrón told The New York Times that the long-term goal of the Sol Project is to "create a new canon" of Latinx theater.

Gaviria has also worked on the advisory board and steering committee for the Parent Artist Advocacy League (PAAL), which is "a national community, resource hub, and solutions generator for individuals with caregiver responsibilities and institutions who strive to support them," and a video of her 2019 PAAL summit session on December 6, 2019 is featured as an anti-racism resource. Gaviria's work with PAAL has included frequent participation in events, including conferences and forums, and essay writing to promote parent-artist advocacy. She is a member of the PAAL Executive Team and PAAL Board.

Gaviria was a 2018 National Association of Latino Arts and Cultures (NALAC) Advocacy Leadership Institute (ALI) fellow and traveled to Washington, D.C. to lobby lawmakers for NALAC priorities.

She is currently on the Steering Committee for the Latinx Theatre Commons, a movement made up of diverse artists, scholars, and administrators that seek to raise awareness of Latinx theatre.

== Critical reception ==
In 2009, San Francisco Chronicle theater critic Robert Hurwitt described Gaviria's performance as the title role in Lydia as "Beautiful and focused," writing that "Gaviria embodies the charisma with which Lydia galvanizes the household, awakening Ceci and enchanting David Pintado's smart, attentive, poetic, adolescent younger brother, Misha." Philip Kolin of the Shakespeare Bulletin reviewed Romeo and Juliet, presented by the Alabama Shakespeare Festival in 2008, and wrote, "While Avery Clark’s Romeo and Adriana Gaviria’s Juliet did not speak with Hispanic accents, they nonetheless powerfully captured the passion and horror of a high-tech Miami of the mind." Terry Teachout writes for The Wall Street Journal, "I was especially impressed with Adriana Gaviria, who plays Juliet as a very young-looking maiden, thereby increasing the dramatic charge of her pubescent attraction to Avery Clark's regular-guy Romeo." In a 2005 review of Anna in the Tropics at The Pasadena Playhouse, Laura Hitchcock writes for CurtainUp magazine that "Gaviria's interpretation of an effervescent teenager is too contemporary but Gaviria shows her range in the tragic closing scenes." In 2013, Michael Mulhern of BroadwayWorld described Gaviria's performance as Yadira in Just Like Us (written by Karen Zacarías, based on the book by Helen Thorpe) as "outstanding," while Lisa Kennedy of The Denver Post described Gaviria as part of a "gifted group."

== Theater credits ==
Title	Role	Notes
Anna in the Tropics	Marela	(Dir. Richard Hamburger) Pasadena Playhouse, Arizona Theatre Company, Dallas Theater Center
The Glass Menagerie	Laura	(Dir. Timothy Bond) Syracuse Stage
Just Like Us	Yadira	(Dir. Kent Thompson) Denver Center
Lydia	Lydia	(Dir. Jasson Minadakis) Marin Theatre Company
Romeo and Julieta	Julieta	(Dir. Henry Godinez) Chicago Shakespeare Theater (staged reading)
The Count of Monte Cristo	Haydee	(Dir. Charles Morey) Alabama Shakespeare Festival
Romeo and Juliet	Juliet	(Dir. Geoffrey Sherman) Alabama Shakespeare Festival
Stories on Stage	Various	(Dir. Norma Moore) Denver Center
The Escape Artist's Children	Angie	(Dir. Pam MacKinnon) Vassar/NY Stage & Film
September Shoes	Ana	(Dir. Amy Gonzalez) Denver Center
Juanita's Statue	Beatriz/Others	(Dir. Leah Gardiner) Hartford Stage
Luscious Music	Sony	(Dir. Michael Garcés) Working Theater
The Black Eyed	Tamam	(Dir. Betty Shamieh) Immigrants' Theatre Project
Journey Theatre	Marina/Others	(Dir. Marcy Arlin/Victor Maog) Immigrants' Theatre Project
Little Pitfall (Pasticka)	Nannette Deasy	(Dir. Flipsxz Flipsxz) Immigrants' Theatre Project
The Birds	Ms. Jekyl/Iris	(Dir. Christopher Bayes) Yale Repertory Theatre
Cabaret	Helga-Kit Kat Girl	(Dir. William Frears) Yale Cabaret
Trade	Darla	(Dir. Valentina Fratti) Young Playwrights Festival
The Cubans	Vero	(Dir. Victoria Collado) Miami New Drama
She Stoops to Conquer	Constance Neville	(Dir. Therald Todd) FIU Theatre Department
Dancing at Lughnasa	Agnes	(Dir. Therald Todd) FIU Theatre Department
The Rose Tattoo	Rosa	(Dir. Wayne E. Robinson) FIU Theatre Department

== Filmography ==
=== Film ===
Year	Title	Role	Notes
2004	The Bakery	N/A	Hair Stylist
2006	Sueños	Myra	
2008	Tamarind	N/A	Assistant director and makeup artist
2011	Broken Wings	N/A	Assistant director and makeup artist
2019	You and I, Always	Camilla	Also writer for additional text
2021	Crabs in a Barrel	Cassie	
TBA	Doin' Great	N/A	Post-production; associate producer

=== Television ===
Year	Title	Role	Notes
2009	Law & Order:	Lucy Valdez	
2011	Person of Interest	Christina Rojas	
