= Adrijana Pupovac =

Serbian politician

Adrijana Pupovac (Serbian Cyrillic: Адријана Пуповац; born 1984) is a politician in Serbia. She has served in the National Assembly of Serbia since 2020 as a member of the Serbian Progressive Party.

== Private career ==
Pupovac was born in Bor, in what was then the Socialist Republic of Serbia in the Socialist Federal Republic of Yugoslavia. She has a master's degree in economics. Prior to her election to the national assembly, she was the director of Samački smeštaj Bor.

== Politician ==
=== Municipal politics ===
Pupovac was a member of the Bor city assembly from 2010 to 2018. She received the fourth position on the Progressive Party's electoral list for the city in the 2010 Serbian local elections and received a mandate when the list won seven out of thirty-five mandates. She was promoted to the third position in the 2014 local elections and was re-elected when the Progressive list won a majority victory with twenty-one mandates. She did not seek re-election in 2018.

=== Parliamentarian ===
Pupovac was given the 162nd position on the Progressive Party's Aleksandar Vučić — For Our Children list in the 2020 Serbian parliamentary election and was elected when the list won a landslide majority with 188 out of 250 mandates. She is a member of the committee on spatial planning, transport, infrastructure, and telecommunications; a deputy member of the committee on the economy, regional development, trade, tourism, and energy; a deputy member of the committee on finance, state budget, and control of public spending; and a member of the parliamentary friendship groups with Australia, Austria, Bosnia and Herzegovina, Bulgaria, China, Cuba, Cyprus, Egypt, Italy, Japan, Mexico, Montenegro, Palestine, Russia, the countries of Sub-Saharan Africa, Tunisia, Turkey, Ukraine, and the United Arab Emirates.
