= Pierre Petit (politician) =

Martinican politician (1930–2022)

Pierre Petit (French: [pjɛʁ pəti]; 22 January 1930 – 4 February 2022) was a Martinican politician who was elected to the French National Assembly in 1993. He was born in Martinique, France, and died on 4 February 2022 at the age of 92.
