= Adrien =

Adrien is a given name and surname, and the French spelling for the name Adrian. It is also the masculine form of the feminine name Adrienne. It may refer to:

== People ==
=== Given name ===
- Adrien Albert (1907–1989), Australian chemist
- Adrien Alpini (1889–1950), French racing cyclist
- Adrien André (1884–1965), French politician
- Adrien Anneet (1908–?), Belgian Olympic boxer
- Adrien Arcand (1899–1967), Canadian politician, writer, and journalist
- Adrien Aron (1902–1969), French tennis and bridge player, and philately specialist
- Adrien Arsenault (1889–1941), Canadian lawyer and politician
- Adrien Atiman (c. 1866–1956), French West African Catholic catechist and medical doctor
- Adrien Auzout (1622–1691), French astronomer
- Adrien Backscheider (born 1992), French cross-country skier
- Adrien Baillargeon (1918–1995), Canadian strongman and professional wrestler
- Adrien Baillet (1649–1706), French scholar and critic
- Adrien Barrère (1874–1931), French poster artist and painter
- Adrien Barrier (1891–1915), French wrestler
- Adrien Bart (born 1991), French sprint canoeist
- Adrien Barthe (1828–1898), French composer
- Adrien Bas (1884–1925), French painter and pastellist
- Adrien Basin (died after 1498), Franco-Flemish composer, singer, and diplomat
- Adrien Beard (born 1970/1971), American voice actor, storyboard artist, producer, and director
- Adrien Beaudry (1879–1942), Canadian lawyer and politician
- Adrien Bertrand (1888–1917), French novelist
- Adrien Boichis (born 2003), French road cyclist and cross-country mountain biker
- Adrien Bongiovanni (born 1999), Belgian footballer
- Adrien Jules Jean Bonhoure (1860–1929), Chinese-born French governor
- Adrien Borel (1886–1966), French psychiatrist and psychoanalyst
- Adrien Bossel (born 1986), Swiss tennis player
- Adrien Botlar (born 1996), Mauritian footballer
- Adrien Briffod (born 1994), Swiss triathlete
- Adrien Brody (born 1973), American actor
- Adrien Broner (born 1989), American professional boxer
- Adrien Broom (born 1980), American photographer
- Adrien Buttafocchi (1907–1937), French racing cyclist
- Adrien Carpentiers (died 1778), English portrait painter
- Adrien Chenot (1803–1855), French engineer
- Adrien Clarke (born 1981), American National Football League player
- Adrien Closmenil (born 2007), French racing driver
- Adrien Costa (born 1997), American cyclist
- Adrien Coulomb (born 1990), French professional footballer
- Adrien Courtois (1905–1981), French racewalker
- Adrien Dauzats (1804–1868), French painter, lithographer, and illustrator
- Adrien de Biasi, real name of Drag Couenne (born 1997), Belgian drag queen
- Adrien Decourcelle (1821–1892), French writer and playwright
- Adrien Degbey (1918–1971), Dahomeyan politician
- Adrien de Gasparin (1783–1862), French statesman and agriculturist
- Adrien de Gerlache (1866–1934), Belgian Royal Navy officer
- Adrien Deghelt (born 1985), Belgian hurdler
- Adrien Delorme (died after 1783), French furniture maker
- Adrien Demont (1851–1928), French landscape painter
- Adrien Demuth (born 1991), French chess grandmaster
- Adrien Deschryver (1939–1989), Belgian photographer and conservationist
- Adrien Charles Deshommets de Martainville (1783–1847), French politician
- Adrien Devals (1882–1945), French-born Singaporean Roman Catholic priest, and Bishop of Malacca
- Adrien Dipanda (born 1988), French handball player
- Adrien Dolimont (born 1988), Belgian politician
- Adrien Dollfus (1858–1921), French carcinologist
- Adrien Douady (1935–2006), French mathematician
- Adrien Dufresne (1904–1983), Canadian architect
- Adrien Dumont de Chassart (born 2000), Belgian professional golfer
- Adrien Duport (1759–1798), French politician and lawyer
- Adrien Duquesnoy (1759–1808), French politician
- Adrien Duval (born 1990), Mauritian politician and barrister
- Adrien Duvillard (disambiguation)
- Adrien Dyel de Vaudroques (1605–1662), French governor of Martinique
- Adrien Fainsilber (1932–2023), French architect and urbanist
- Adrien Fauchier-Magnan (1873–1963), French tennis player
- Adrien Faviana (born 1986), French professional football player
- Adrien Filez (1885–1965), French footballer
- Adrien Fourmaux (born 1995), French professional rally driver
- Adrien René Franchet (1834–1900), French botanist
- Adrien Frasse-Sombet (born 1983), French classical cellist
- Adrien Gallo (born 1989), French member of pop rock band BB Brunes
- Adrien Garel (born 1996), French road and track cyclist
- Adrien Étienne Gaudez (1845–1902), French sculptor
- Adrien Gilbert (1931–2010), Canadian weightlifter
- Adrien Giraud (1936–2018), French politician
- Adrien Giunta (born 2001), Belgian footballer
- Adrien Goetz (born 1966), French art history professor, art critic, and novelist
- Adrien Goffinet (1812–1886), Belgian baron
- Adrien Goñi (born 1988), Spanish footballer
- Adrien Gouffier de Boissy (?–1523), French Roman Catholic bishop and cardinal
- Adrien Gouteyron (1933–2020), French politician
- Adrien Goybet (1922–1995), French Navy officer
- Adrien Greslon (1618–1697), French Jesuit missionary to China
- Adrien Grondin (born 1996), French professional squash player
- Adrien Guillonnet (born 1993), French cyclist
- Adrien Guyon (1866–1926), French fencer
- Adrien Hardy (born 1978), French Olympic rower
- Adrien Hébert (1890–1967), French-born Canadian painter
- Adrien Houngbédji (born 1942), Beninese politician
- Adrien Hunou (born 1994), French footballer
- Adrien Jaccottet (born 1983), Swiss lawyer and former football referee
- Adrien Juvanon (1875–1950), French colonial administrator and author
- Adrien Karbowsky (1855–1945), French painter, decorator, and architect
- Adrien Kela (born 1991), New Caledonian middle-distance runner
- Adrien Lachenal (1849–1918), Swiss politician and jurist
- Adrien de La Fage (1801–1862), French composer and musicologist
- Adrien Lagard (died 1878), French composer
- Adrien Lambert (1913–2003), Canadian farmer and politician
- Adrien Lamy (1896–1940), French actor and singer of theatre, film, and radio
- Adrien Languillat (1808–1878), French Jesuit and missionary in China
- Adrien Lavieille (1848–1920), French painter
- Adrien Lebeau (born 1999), French professional footballer
- Adrien Lejeune (1847–1942), French revolutionary
- Adrien Lemaire (1852–1902), French botanist and professor of natural history
- Adrien L. J. Leps (1893–after 1945), French World War I flying ace
- Adrien Leroy (born 1981), French poet and chess player
- Adrien de Lezay-Marnésia (1769–1814), French prefect
- Adrien Loir (1862–1941), French bacteriologist
- Adrien Louveau (born 2000), French professional footballer
- Adrien Maire (born 2000), French road cyclist
- Adrien Manglard (1695–1760), French painter, draughtsman, and engraver
- Adrien Marquet (1884–1955), French mayor
- Adrien Marx (1837–1906), French journalist, playwright, and writer
- Adrien Masreliez (1717–1806), French ornamental sculptor
- Adrien Mattenet (born 1987), French table tennis player
- Adrien Ménager (born 1991), French footballer
- Adrien Meunier (1905–1971), Canadian lawyer and politician
- Adrien Moerman (born 1988), French basketball player
- Adrien Monfray (born 1990), French professional footballer
- Adrien Moreau (1843–1906), French genre and historical painter, sculptor, and illustrator
- Adrien Morenas (born 1982), French osteopath and politician
- Adrien Morillas (born 1958), French motorcycle road racer
- Adrien Mörk (born 1979), French professional golfer
- Adrien Morot (born 1970), Canadian makeup artist
- Adrien Mournet (born 1953), French rugby union player
- Adrien Albert de Mun (1841–1914), French politician, nobleman, journalist, and social reformer
- Adrien Niyonshuti (born 1987), Rwandan bicycle racer
- Adrien Maurice de Noailles, 3rd Duke of Noailles (1678–1766), French nobleman and soldier
- Adrien de Noailles, 8th Duke of Noailles (1869–1953), French aristocrat and Olympian
- Adrien Nocent (1913–1996), Belgian monk and liturgical theologian
- Adrien Nookadu, Australian contestant on The X Factor (Australian TV series) season 6
- Adrien Nougaret (born 1990), known as Zerator, French video game online streamer, event organizer, and esports commentator
- Adrien Ntigacika, Burundian businessman
- Adrien Nunez (born 1999), American social media influencer, singer-songwriter, and former college basketball player
- Adrien Oléon (born 1989), French rugby union player
- Adrien Max Orban (1881–1969), Belgian rower
- Adrien Ouellette (1940–2023), Canadian politician
- Adrien Pagerie (born 1992), French professional footballer
- Adrien de Pauger (ca. 1685 or 1682–1726), French engineer and cartographer
- Adrien Payn (1800–1855), French novelist and playwright
- Adrien Pélissié (born 1990), French rugby union player
- Adrien Perez (disambiguation)
- Adrien Petit (born 1990), French racing cyclist
- Adrien Philippe (1815–1894), French-born Swiss horologist, watchmaker, and businessperson
- Adrien Pinard (1916–1998), Canadian psychologist
- Adrien Pinot (born 2001), French professional footballer
- Adrien Planté (born 1985), French rugby union player
- Adrien Plautin (1902–1996), French racing cyclist
- Adrien Plavsic (born 1970), Canadian NHL player
- Adrien Poliquin (1929–2012), Canadian wrestler
- Adrien Pommier (1919–1973), French radio engineer during World War II
- Adrien Pouliot (1896–1980), Canadian mathematician and educator
- Adrien D. Pouliot (born 1957), Canadian lawyer, businessman, and politician
- Adrien Pressemane (1879–1929), French politician and journalist
- Adrien Prévost de Longpérier (1816–1882), French numismatist, archaeologist, and curator
- Adrien Proust (1834–1903), French epidemiologist and hygienist
- Adrien Quatennens (born 1990), French politician
- Adrien Quiret de Margency (1727–c. 1802), French officer, writer, and Encyclopédiste
- Adrien Rabiot (born 1995), French professional footballer
- Adrien Raymond, Haitian ambassador to the United States
- Adrien Recurt (1798–1872), French medical doctor
- Adrien Regattin (born 1991), French-born Turkish professional footballer
- Adrien Ries (1933–1991), Luxembourgian economist
- Adrien Robinson (born 1988), American NFL and AAF player
- Adrien Rommel (1914–1963), French Olympic fencer
- Adrien de Rougé (1782–1838), French statesman, soldier, and peer
- Adrien Rougier (1892–1984), French organist, organ builder, conductor, and composer
- Adrien Rouquette (1813–1887), American writer, poet, and Catholic missionary to Choctaw Native Americans
- Adrien Saddier (born 1992), French professional golfer
- Adrien Sala (born 1980), Canadian politician
- Adrien Sathler (born 1992), Brazilian-American footballer
- Adrien Saussez (born 1991), Belgian professional footballer
- Adrien Segal (born 1985), American artist, furniture maker, and sculptor
- Adrien Sibomana (born 1953), Burundian former politician and current agriculturalist
- Adrien Silva (born 1989), Portuguese-French professional footballer
- Adrien Stoutenburg (1916–1982), American poet, writer, and librarian
- Adrien Sturt (born 1986), Australian-British MBA-, NBL-, SLB-, RBA-, BTBC-, and WBA player
- Adrien Tailhand (1818–1889), French lawyer and politician
- Adrien Tambay (born 1991), French professional racing driver
- Adrien Tameze (born 1994), French professional footballer
- Adrien Taquet (born 1977), French politician
- Adrien Taunay the Younger (1803–1828), French painter and draftsman
- Adrien Tesson (born 1997), French figure skater
- Adrien Théaux (born 1984), French alpine ski racer and non-commissioned officer
- Adrien Thélin (1842–1922), Swiss politician
- Adrien Thibault (1844–1918), French ceramicist and historian
- Adrien Thierry (1885–1961), French lawyer and diplomat
- Adrien Thomasson (born 1993), French professional footballer
- Adrien Tixier (1893–1946), French politician and diplomat
- Adrien Trebel (born 1991), French professional footballer
- Adrien Truffert (born 2001), French professional footballer
- Adrien Vachette (1753–1839), French goldsmith
- Adrien Van Beveren (born 1991), French motocross and rally raid rider
- Adrien van der Burch (1501–1557), Dutch judge and diplomat
- Adrien Vandelle (1902–1976), French skier
- Adrien Vély (1864–1935), French journalist and playwright
- Adrien Viguier (1805–1884), French writer, playwright, and literary critic
- Adrien Voisin (1890–1979), American sculptor
- Adrien Warion (1837–1880), French medical doctor and botanist
- Adrien de Wignacourt (1618–1697), French-born Maltese politician
- Adrien Zeller (1940–2009), French politician

=== Surname ===
- Caroline Adrien (born 1987), French professional kitesurfer
- Jeff Adrien (born 1986), American BSN player
- Martin-Joseph Adrien (1766–1823), French operatic bass

== Fictional characters ==
- Adrien Agreste, a.k.a. Cat Noir, in the French TV series Miraculous: Tales of Ladybug & Cat Noir

== See also ==
- Adrien-Jean (disambiguation)
- Adrien-Joseph (disambiguation)
- Adrien-Louis de Bonnières, duc de Guînes (1735–1806), French Army officer, aristocrat, musician, and diplomat
- Adrien-Henri de Jussieu (1797–1853), French botanist
- Adrien-Marie Legendre (1752–1833), French mathematician
- Adrien-Gabriel Morice (1859–1939), French Roman Catholic missionary priest, author, and linguist
- Adrien-Michel-Hyacinthe Blin de Sainmore (1733–1807), French poet, playwright, and historian
- Adrien-Thomas Perdou de Subligny (1636–1696), French actor, writer, and playwright
- Adrien-Nicolas Piédefer, marquis de La Salle (1735–1818), French writer and cavalry officer
- Adrien-François Servais (1807–1866), Belgian Romantic composer, musical educator, and classical cellist
- Adrien-Robert Toussaint (1895–1951), French racing cyclist
- Pierre-Adrien, a given name
- Adrian
- Adrianne
- Adrienne
