= Adrienne =

- Gender: Female
- Language: French

Origin
- Meaning: from the city of Hadria

Other names
- Short forms: Addie, Rienne, Enne
- Related names: Adrian, Adriana, Adriane, Adrien, Adrienn, Adri

Adrienne is the French feminine form of the male name Adrien.

- Adrienne Ames (1907–1947), American actress
- Adrienne Armstrong (born 1969), wife of Green Day frontman Billie Joe Armstrong
- Adrienne Arsenault (born 1967), Canadian journalist
- Adrienne Bailon (born 1983), member of girl group The Cheetah Girls and host of the Real Talk Show
- Adrienne Barbeau (born 1945), American actress
- Adrienne Beames (1942–2018), Australian long-distance runner
- Adrienne Bolland (1896–1975), French test pilot and first woman to fly over the Andes
- Adrienne Clarke (born 1938), Australian botanist and former Lieutenant Governor of Victoria
- Adrienne Clarkson (born 1939), Canadian journalist and former Governor General of Canada
- Adrienne Corri (1930–2016), Scottish actress
- Adrienne Dairolles (1863–1940), English actress
- Adrienne Fazan (1906–1986), American Academy Award-winning film editor
- Adrienne Frantz (born 1978), American actress and singer-songwriter
- Adrienne Goodson (born 1966), American former professional basketball player
- Adrienne Gray, American make-up artist and political commentator
- Adrienne Ruth Hardham, professor of plant science at Australian National University
- Adrienne Horvath (1925–2012), French politician
- Adrienne W. Kemp (1930–2022), British mathematical statistician
- Adrienne Kennedy (born 1931), African-American playwright
- Adrienne Krausz (born 1967), Hungarian pianist
- Adrienne de La Fayette (1759–1807), wife of Marquis de Lafayette
- Adrienne La Russa (born 1948), American actress
- Adrienne Lau, American singer and actress
- Adrienne Lecouvreur (1692–1730), French actress
- Adrienne Maloof (born 1961), American businesswoman and television personality
- Adrienne Matzenauer (aka Adrienne Fontana, Adrienne Myerberg, Adrienne Henoch) (1914–2010), American singer
- Adrienne Pearce, South African actress
- Adrienne Posta (born 1948), English actress
- Adrienne Sophie Rayl (1898–1989), American mathematician
- Adrienne Rich (1929–2012), American poet and essayist
- Adrienne Roy (1953–2010), comic book colorist
- Adrienne Shelly (1966–2006), American filmmaker and actress
- Adrienne Simpson (1943–2010), New Zealand broadcaster, historian, musicologist and writer
- Adrienne Steckling-Coen (1934–2006), American fashion designer known as Adri
- Princess Adrienne of Sweden (born 2008), Swedish Princess, granddaughter of King Carl XVI Gustaf and daughter of Princess Madeleine of Sweden.
- Adrienne Du Vivier (1626–1706), one of the first white women settlers in Montreal
- Adrienne Vittadini (born 1945), Hungarian-American fashion designer
- Adrienne Veigele (c. 1862–1915), French teacher and activist
- Adrienne Wu (born 1990), Canadian fashion designer

== Fictional characters ==
- Adrienne Attoms, from the Netflix original series Project Mc²
- Adrienne Delaney, protagonist in the 1995 computer game Phantasmagoria
- Adrienne Frost, Marvel Comics character
- Adrienne Johnson Kiriakis, from the soap opera Days of our Lives

== See also ==
- Adrian
- Adrianne
