= Blin =

Blin may refer to the following:

- Russian pancakes, called Blin or (plural) blini.
- Blin (surname)
- Montaigu-le-Blin, commune in the Allier department, France
- Bilen people (or, Blin or Bilin), an ethnic group of Eritrea
- Blin language, spoken by the Bilen people
- Blin (footballer)

== See also ==
- Blinn
- Bilin (disambiguation)
- Saint-Blin, commune in the Haute-Marne department, France
