= List of Belgian football transfers summer 2021 =

This is a list of Belgian football transfers for the 2021 summer transfer window. Only transfers involving a team from the professional divisions are listed, including the 18 teams in the Belgian First Division A and the 8 teams playing in the Belgian First Division B.

The summer transfer window opened on 1 July 2021 and towards the end of August 2021.

Note that several transfers were announced prior to the opening date. Furthermore, players without a club may join one at any time, either during or in between transfer windows. After the transfer window closes a few completed transfers might still be announced a few days later.

== Transfers ==
| Date | Name | Moving from | Moving to | Fee | Note |
|---|---|---|---|---|---|
| 1 July 2021 | (France) Ivann Botella | (France) Lyon La Duchère | RWDM47 | Undisclosed | |
| 1 July 2021 | (France) Joris Delle | Free Agent | KV Kortrijk | Free | |
| 1 July 2021 | (Denmark) Lasse Vigen Christensen | (Denmark) Brøndby IF | SV Zulte Waregem | Undisclosed | |
| 1 July 2021 | (Norway) Bent Sørmo | (Norway) Kristiansund BK | SV Zulte Waregem | Undisclosed | |
| 1 July 2021 | (Netherlands) Joost van Aken | (England) Sheffield Wednesday | SV Zulte Waregem | Undisclosed | |
| 1 July 2021 | Alessandro Ciranni | Royal Excel Mouscron | SV Zulte Waregem | Undisclosed | |
| 1 July 2021 | (Germany) Marcel Mehlem | Royale Union Saint-Gilloise | (Germany) SC Paderborn 07 | Undisclosed | |
| 1 July 2021 | (England) Matthew Sorinola | (England) Milton Keynes Dons F.C. | Royale Union Saint-Gilloise | Undisclosed | |
| 1 July 2021 | (England) Marcel Lewis | (England) Chelsea F.C. | Royale Union Saint-Gilloise | Undisclosed | |
| 1 July 2021 | (Netherlands) Bart Nieuwkoop | (Netherlands) Feyenoord | Royale Union Saint-Gilloise | Undisclosed | |
| 1 July 2021 | Jorben Vanhulle | KV Oostende | F.C.V. Dender E.H. | Free | |
| 1 July 2021 | (Zambia) Fashion Sakala | KV Oostende | (Scotland) Rangers FC | Free | |
| 1 July 2021 | (Cape Verde) Kenny Rocha | (France) AS Nancy Lorraine | KV Oostende | Undisclosed | |
| 1 July 2021 | Iebe Swers | R.F.C. Seraing (1922) | KV Mechelen | Undisclosed | |
| 1 July 2021 | Hugo Cuypers | (Greece) Olympiacos F.C. | KV Mechelen | Undisclosed | |
| 1 July 2021 | Senna Miangué | (Italy) Cagliari Calcio | Cercle Brugge | Loan | |
| 1 July 2021 | (Norway) Jesper Daland | (Norway) IK Start | Cercle Brugge | Undisclosed | |
| 1 July 2021 | (Cyprus) Stelios Andreou | (Cyprus) Olympiakos Nicosia | R. Charleroi S.C. | Undisclosed | |
| 1 July 2021 | (Switzerland) Stefan Knezevic | (Switzerland) FC Luzern | R. Charleroi S.C. | Undisclosed | |
| 1 July 2021 | (Ivory Coast) Aboubakar Keita | OH Leuven | R. Charleroi S.C. | Loan | |
| 1 July 2021 | Louis Fortin | Standard Liège | KAA Gent | Free | |
| 1 July 2021 | Julien De Sart | KV Kortrijk | KAA Gent | Free | |
| 1 July 2021 | (Denmark) Andrew Hjulsager | KV Oostende | KAA Gent | Undisclosed | |
| 1 July 2021 | Gianni Bruno | SV Zulte Waregem | KAA Gent | Undisclosed | |
| 1 July 2021 | (France) Christopher Operi | (France) LB Châteauroux | KAA Gent | Undisclosed | |
| 1 July 2021 | (Spain) Mujaid Sadick | (Spain) Deportivo de La Coruña | KRC Genk | Undisclosed | |
| 1 July 2021 | Siemen Voet | Club Brugge | (Netherlands) PEC Zwolle | Undisclosed | |
| 1 July 2021 | Grégory Grisez | K Beerschot VA | (Luxembourg) CS Fola Esch | Free | |
| 1 July 2021 | (Croatia) Leon Kreković | (Croatia) HNK Hajduk Split | K Beerschot VA | Undisclosed | |
| 1 July 2021 | (Netherlands) Wesley Hoedt | (England) Southampton FC | RSC Anderlecht | Undisclosed | |
| 1 July 2021 | Colin Coosemans | KAA Gent | RSC Anderlecht | Free | |
| 1 July 2021 | (Switzerland) Michael Frey | (Turkey) Fenerbahçe S.K. | R Antwerp FC | Undisclosed | |
| 1 July 2021 | Björn Engels | (England) Aston Villa FC | R Antwerp FC | Undisclosed | |
| 1 July 2021 | Abderahmane Soussi | Royale Union Saint-Gilloise | R Antwerp FC | Undisclosed | |
| 1 July 2021 | (Ukraine) Denis Prychynenko | K Beerschot VA | K.M.S.K. Deinze | Free | |
| 1 July 2021 | (England) Zech Medley | (England) Arsenal FC | KV Oostende | Undisclosed | |
| 1 July 2021 | (Kenya) Joseph Okumu | (Sweden) IF Elfsborg | KAA Gent | Undisclosed | |
| 1 July 2021 | (Morocco) Amine Khammas | Waasland-Beveren | (Cyprus) Apollon Limassol FC | Undisclosed | |
| 1 July 2021 | Aboubakary Koita | Waasland-Beveren | Sint-Truidense V.V. | Undisclosed | |
| 1 July 2021 | Siebren Lathouwers | Sint-Truidense V.V. | Belisia SV | Undisclosed | |
| 1 July 2021 | Erwin Senakuku | RWDM47 | UR Namur | Undisclosed | |
| 1 July 2021 | Zinho Gano | KRC Genk | SV Zulte Waregem | Undisclosed | |
| 1 July 2021 | Thibault De Smet | (France) Stade de Reims | K Beerschot VA | Loan | |
| 1 July 2021 | (Italy) Lorenzo Paolucci | (Italy) Reggina 1914 | Royale Union Saint-Gilloise | Undisclosed | |
| 1 July 2021 | (Serbia) Vaso Vasic | Royal Excel Mouscron | (Switzerland) FC Luzern | Undisclosed | |
| 1 July 2021 | (Spain) Sergio Gomez | (Germany) Borussia Dortmund | RSC Anderlecht | Undisclosed | |
| 1 July 2021 | (England) Taylor Harwood-Bellis | (England) Manchester City | RSC Anderlecht | Loan | |
| 1 July 2021 | (Netherlands) Carel Eiting | (Netherlands) AFC Ajax | KRC Genk | Undisclosed | |
| 1 July 2021 | (Brazil) Vinicius Souza | Lommel S.K. | KV Mechelen | Loan | |
| 1 July 2021 | (Algeria) Adem Zorgane | (Algeria) Paradou AC | RSC Charleroi | Undisclosed | |
| 1 July 2021 | (Zimbabwe) Knowledge Musona | RSC Anderlecht | (Saudi Arabia) Al-Tai FC | Undisclosed | |
| 1 July 2021 | (Costa Rica) Manfred Ugalde | Lommel S.K. | (Netherlands) FC Twente | Loan | |
| 1 July 2021 | (Colombia) Marlos Moreno | (England) Manchester City | KV Kortrijk | Loan | |
| 1 July 2021 | (Tanzania) Kelvin John | (England) Brooke House Football Academy | KRC Genk | Undisclosed | |
| 1 July 2021 | (Ghana) Samuel Asamoah | Sint-Truidense V.V. | (Romania) FC U Craiova 1948 | Free | |
| 1 July 2021 | (Senegal) Formose Mendy | Club Brugge KV | (France) Amiens SC | Undisclosed | |
| 1 July 2021 | (Greece) Apostolos Konstantopoulos | (Greece) Panetolikos F.C. | K Beerschot VA | Undisclosed | |
| 1 July 2021 | Jelle Bataille | KV Oostende | R Antwerp FC | Undisclosed | |
| 1 July 2021 | (Cameroon) Samuel Gouet | (Austria) SC Rheindorf Altach | KV Mechelen | Undisclosed | |
| 1 July 2021 | (France) Rémy Descamps | R. Charleroi S.C. | (France) FC Nantes | Undisclosed | |
| 1 July 2021 | (Austria) Peter Žulj | RSC Anderlecht | (Turkey) İstanbul Başakşehir F.K. | Undisclosed | |
| 1 July 2021 | (Ghana) Abraham Okyere | (Ghana) International Allies F.C. | K Beerschot VA | Undisclosed | |
| 1 July 2021 | (Ivory Coast) Jean Thierry Lazare | R. Charleroi S.C. | Royale Union Saint-Gilloise | Loan | |
| 1 July 2021 | (Nigeria) Emmanuel Dennis | Club Brugge KV | (England) Watford F.C. | Undisclosed | |
| 1 July 2021 | (Cameroon) Arnold Garita | RSC Charleroi | (France) Football Bourg-en-Bresse Péronnas 01 | Undisclosed | |
| 1 July 2021 | (Austria) Daniel Maderner | (Austria) SC Rheindorf Altach | Waasland-Beveren | Undisclosed | |
| 2 July 2021 | (Spain) Waldo Rubio | (Spain) Real Valladolid | Cercle Brugge | Loan | |
| 2 July 2021 | (Uruguay) Felipe Avenatti | Standard Liège | Royale Union Saint-Gilloise | Loan | |
| 3 July 2021 | (Serbia) Sava Petrov | KVC Westerlo | (Slovenia) NK Olimpija | Undisclosed | |
| 3 July 2021 | (Kazakhstan) Yan Vorogovsky | K Beerschot VA | (Kazakhstan) FC Kairat | Free | |
| 3 July 2021 | (Wales) Andy King | OH Leuven | (England) Bristol City | Free | |
| 4 July 2021 | (Brazil) David Sousa | (Brazil) Botafogo FR | Cercle Brugge | Loan | |
| 4 July 2021 | Michel-Ange Balikwisha | Standard Liège | R Antwerp FC | Undisclosed | |
| 5 July 2021 | (Burkina Faso) Trova Boni | KV Mechelen | (Portugal) Belenenses SAD | Free | |
| 5 July 2021 | (France) Franck Koré | RE Virton | (Luxembourg) FC Swift Hesperange | Free | |
| 5 July 2021 | Junior Sambu Marsoni | (France) SO Cholet | R.F.C. Seraing (1922) | Free | |
| 5 July 2021 | Dino Arslanagić | KAA Gent | (Turkey) Göztepe S.K. | Undisclosed | |
| 6 July 2021 | (Croatia) Franko Andrijašević | KAA Gent | (China) Zhejiang Professional F.C. | Undisclosed | |
| 6 July 2021 | (Mali) Aldom Deuro | Cercle Brugge | (France) LB Châteauroux | Loan | |
| 6 July 2021 | (Burkina Faso) Hervé Koffi | (France) Lille OSC | RSC Charleroi | Undisclosed | |
| 6 July 2021 | (Turkey) Cenk Özkacar | (France) Olympique Lyon | OH Leuven | Loan | |
| 6 July 2021 | Naïm Boujouh | RWDM47 | K.F.C. Dessel Sport | Free | |
| 6 July 2021 | (France) Yassine Ben Hamed | (France) Lille OSC | R Antwerp FC | Undisclosed | |
| 6 July 2021 | (Cape Verde) Alexis Gonçalves | (France) LB Châteauroux | RWDM47 | Undisclosed | |
| 7 July 2021 | (France) Damien Marcq | SV Zulte Waregem | Royale Union Saint-Gilloise | Free | |
| 7 July 2021 | Mike Trésor | (Netherlands) Willem II | KRC Genk | Undisclosed | |
| 7 July 2021 | (Cameroon) Martin Hongla | R Antwerp FC | (Italy) Hellas Verona F.C. | Loan | |
| 8 July 2021 | (France) Scotty Sadzoute | (France) Lille OSC | OH Leuven | Undisclosed | |
| 8 July 2021 | (Germany) Jesaja Herrmann | (Germany) VfL Wolfsburg | KV Kortrijk | Loan | |
| 8 July 2021 | (Germany) Niklas Dorsch | KAA Gent | (Germany) FC Augsburg | Undisclosed | |
| 9 July 2021 | (Chad) Marius Mouandilmadji | Free Agent | R.F.C. Seraing (1922) | Free | |
| 9 July 2021 | (Ivory Coast) Vakoun Issouf Bayo | (Scotland) Celtic FC | KAA Gent | Undisclosed | |
| 9 July 2021 | (Portugal) Dinis Almeida | (Bulgaria) PFC Lokomotiv Plovdiv | R Antwerp FC | Free | |
| 10 July 2021 | (Iran) Alireza Beiranvand | R Antwerp FC | (Portugal) Boavista F.C. | Loan | |
| 12 July 2021 | Théo Defourny | K.A.S. Eupen | RWDM47 | Undisclosed | |
| 13 July 2021 | (Democratic Republic of the Congo) Dieumerci Mbokani | R Antwerp FC | Kuwait SC | Free | |
| 13 July 2021 | Jérôme Déom | (Netherlands) MVV Maastricht | K.A.S. Eupen | Undisclosed | |
| 13 July 2021 | (France) Clément Tainmont | Free Agent | Royal Excel Mouscron | Free | |
| 13 July 2021 | Zinho Vanheusden | Standard Liège | (Italy) Inter Milan | Undisclosed | |
| 14 July 2021 | (Montenegro) Deni Hočko | Royal Excel Mouscron | (Cyprus) Pafos FC | Undisclosed | |
| 14 July 2021 | (United States) Ethan Horvath | Club Brugge | (England) Nottingham Forest F.C. | Free | |
| 15 July 2021 | (South Africa) Lyle Foster | (Portugal) Vitória S.C. | KVC Westerlo | Loan | |
| 15 July 2021 | (France) Eddy Sylvestre | Standard Liège | (France) Pau FC | Loan | |
| 15 July 2021 | Ruben Geeraerts | R Antwerp FC | KMSK Deinze | Undisclosed | |
| 15 July 2021 | Jellert Van Landschoot | Lierse Kempenzonen | (Netherlands) Helmond Sport | Undisclosed | |
| 15 July 2021 | Benito Raman | (Germany) FC Schalke 04 | RSC Anderlecht | Undisclosed | |
| 15 July 2021 | Yari Stevens | Club Brugge | KAA Gent | Undisclosed | |
| 15 July 2021 | (France) Morgan Poaty | (France) EA Guingamp | R.F.C. Seraing (1922) | Free | |
| 16 July 2021 | Dries Wouters | KRC Genk | (Germany) FC Schalke 04 | Free | |
| 16 July 2021 | (Nigeria) Alhassan Yusuf | (Sweden) IFK Göteborg | R Antwerp FC | Undisclosed | |
| 17 July 2021 | (Croatia) Ivan Fiolić | KRC Genk | (Croatia) NK Osijek | Free | |
| 19 July 2021 | (Ivory Coast) Ambroise Gboho | KVC Westerlo | (France) FC Chambly | Free | |
| 19 July 2021 | Albert Sambi Lokonga | RSC Anderlecht | (England) Arsenal FC | Undisclosed | |
| 19 July 2021 | (Bosnia and Herzegovina) Ognjen Vranješ | RSC Anderlecht | (Greece) AEK Athens | Undisclosed | |
| 19 July 2021 | (France) Youssef Maziz | (France) FC Metz | R.F.C. Seraing (1922) | Loan | |
| 19 July 2021 | (Finland) Jere Uronen | KRC Genk | (France) Stade Brestois 29 | Undisclosed | |
| 20 July 2021 | (Germany) Alfons Amade | (Germany) TSG 1899 Hoffenheim | KV Oostende | Free | |
| 20 July 2021 | (Democratic Republic of the Congo) Parfait Mandanda | R. Charleroi S.C. | Royal Excel Mouscron | Free | |
| 20 July 2021 | Sébastien Dewaest | KRC Genk | OH Leuven | Loan | |
| 20 July 2021 | (Serbia) Boris Popovic | (France) AS Monaco FC | Cercle Brugge | Undisclosed | |
| 20 July 2021 | (Lithuania) Edgaras Utkus | (France) AS Monaco FC | Cercle Brugge | Undisclosed | |
| 21 July 2021 | (Sweden) Kristoffer Olsson | (Russia) FC Krasnodar | RSC Anderlecht | Undisclosed | |
| 21 July 2021 | (Ivory Coast) Odilon Kossounou | Club Brugge | (Germany) Bayer Leverkusen | Undisclosed | |
| 22 July 2021 | Roman Ferber | Royale Union Saint-Gilloise | Royal FC Mandel United | Undisclosed | |
| 22 July 2021 | (Uruguay) Cristopher Fiermarin | (Uruguay) Montevideo City Torque | Lommel S.K. | Loan | |
| 23 July 2021 | (Czech Republic) Michael Krmenčík | Club Brugge | (Czech Republic) SK Slavia Prague | Loan | |
| 23 July 2021 | (Slovenia) Nik Lorbek | Royale Union Saint-Gilloise | (Slovenia) NŠ Mura | Undisclosed | |
| 23 July 2021 | Mitchy Ntelo | Standard Liège | (Netherlands) MVV Maastricht | Loan | |
| 23 July 2021 | Lucas Kalala | Standard Liège | (Netherlands) MVV Maastricht | Loan | |
| 23 July 2021 | Allan Delferrière | Standard Liège | (Netherlands) MVV Maastricht | Loan | |
| 23 July 2021 | (Norway) Aron Dønnum | (Norway) Vålerenga Fotball | Standard Liège | Undisclosed | |
| 23 July 2021 | (France) Dylan Batubinsika | R Antwerp FC | (Portugal) F.C. Famalicão | Undisclosed | |
| 24 July 2021 | (France) Stanley Nsoki | (France) OGC Nice | Club Brugge | Undisclosed | |
| 26 July 2021 | Obbi Oulare | Standard Liège | (England) Barnsley F.C. | Undisclosed | |
| 27 July 2021 | Manuel Angiulli | (Netherlands) MVV Maastricht | Royal Excel Mouscron | Free | |
| 27 July 2021 | (Bulgaria) Ivan Goranov | R. Charleroi S.C. | (Bulgaria) PFC Levski Sofia | Loan | |
| 29 July 2021 | (France) Thierry Ambrose | (France) FC Metz | KV Oostende | Undisclosed | |
| 29 July 2021 | Joachim Carcela | Standard Liège | Royal Excel Mouscron | Free | |
| 29 July 2021 | (Brazil) Kanu | (Brazil) Sociedade Desportiva Juazeirense | K. Rupel Boom F.C. | Free | |
| 29 July 2021 | Tibo Persyn | (Italy) Inter Milan | Club Brugge | Loan | |
| 30 July 2021 | (Denmark) Viktor Fischer | (Denmark) F.C. Copenhagen | R Antwerp FC | Undisclosed | |
| 30 July 2021 | Romain Matthys | K.A.S. Eupen | (Netherlands) MVV Maastricht | Loan | |
| 30 July 2021 | Simon Libert | K.A.S. Eupen | (Netherlands) MVV Maastricht | Loan | |
| 30 July 2021 | Marciano Aziz | K.A.S. Eupen | (Netherlands) MVV Maastricht | Loan | |
| 31 July 2021 | Keres Masangu | K Beerschot VA | RE Virton | Free | |
| 31 July 2021 | Din Sula | Waasland Beveren | RE Virton | Free | |
| 31 July 2021 | (Togo) Euloge Placca Fessou | K Beerschot VA | (Kuwait) Al Tadhamon SC | Loan | |
| 31 July 2021 | (Morocco) Abdel Al Badaoui | R.F.C. Seraing (1922) | (Spain) AD Alcorcón | Free | |
| 31 July 2021 | (Ukraine) Roman Yaremchuk | KAA Gent | (Portugal) S.L. Benfica | Undisclosed | |
| 31 July 2021 | (United States) Jacob Montes | (England) Crystal Palace | Waasland Beveren | Loan | |
| 1 August 2021 | (Montenegro) Stefan Milosevic | Waasland-Beveren | (Israel) Hapoel Ironi Kiryat Shmona F.C. | Undisclosed | |
| 2 August 2021 | Jonas Vinck | Unattached | R.E. Virton | Free | |
| 2 August 2021 | (Luxembourg) Timothy Martin | (France) Nîmes Olympique | R.E. Virton | Undisclosed | |
| 2 August 2021 | (Switzerland) Aimery Pinga | (Switzerland) FC Sion | R.E. Virton | Undisclosed | |
| 2 August 2021 | Maxim De Cuyper | Club Brugge KV | K.V.C. Westerlo | Loan | |
| 2 August 2021 | (Slovakia) Ján Bernát | (Slovakia) MŠK Žilina | K.V.C. Westerlo | Loan | |
| 2 August 2021 | (France) Kévin Hoggas | Cercle Brugge K.S.V. | Waasland-Beveren | Undisclosed | |
| 2 August 2021 | (Mali) Mamoutou N'Diaye | (Spain) CD Marino | K.V.C. Westerlo | Undisclosed | |
| 3 August 2021 | Rocco Reitz | Borussia Mönchengladbach | Sint-Truidense V.V. | Loan | |
| 3 August 2021 | Dylan Mbayo | K.A.A. Gent | K.V. Kortrijk | Undisclosed | |
| 3 August 2021 | Alieu Fadera | (Slovakia) FK Pohronie | S.V. Zulte Waregem | Undisclosed | |
| 4 August 2021 | Joshua Zirkzee | (Germany) FC Bayern Munich | R.S.C. Anderlecht | Loan | |
| 4 August 2021 | (Iran) Kaveh Rezaei | Club Brugge KV | OH Leuven | Undisclosed | |
| 4 August 2021 | (Sweden) Victor Wernersson | K.V. Mechelen | (Norway) Stabæk Fotball | Loan | |
| 4 August 2021 | Adrien Giunta | Standard Liège | Royal Excel Mouscron | Undisclosed | |
| 5 August 2021 | (United States) Sam Vines | (United States) Colorado Rapids | Royal Antwerp F.C. | Undisclosed | |
| 5 August 2021 | (Germany) Johannes Eggestein | (Germany) SV Werder Bremen | Royal Antwerp F.C. | Undisclosed | |
| 5 August 2021 | Anas Hamzaoui | Royale Union Saint-Gilloise | RE Virton | Undisclosed | |
| 5 August 2021 | Jamal Aabbou | Lommel SK | RE Virton | Undisclosed | |
| 5 August 2021 | (Morocco) Ayyoub Allach | Lierse Kempenzonen | RE Virton | Undisclosed | |
| 5 August 2021 | (France) Jad Mouaddib | (Romania) FCV Farul Constanța | RE Virton | Undisclosed | |
| 5 August 2021 | (Benin) Joris Ahlinvi | Unattached | RE Virton | Free | |
| 5 August 2021 | (Italy) Paulo Napoletano | (Italy) Parma Calcio | RE Virton | Undisclosed | |
| 6 August 2021 | (Senegal) Issa Soumaré | (France) US Orléans | K Beerschot VA | Undisclosed | |
| 6 August 2021 | (Ghana) David Atanga | (Germany) Holstein Kiel | KV Oostende | Undisclosed | |
| 6 August 2021 | (Norway) Sivert Heltne Nilsen | Waasland Beveren | (Norway) SK Brann | Undisclosed | | |
| 7 August 2021 | (Brazil) Neto Borges | KRC Genk | (Portugal) C.D. Tondela | Loan | |
| 7 August 2021 | (Ivory Coast) Fernand Gouré | (Israel) Maccabi Netanya F.C. | KVC Westerlo | Undisclosed | |
| 7 August 2021 | (Morocco) Brahim Sabaouni | R.F.C. Seraing | (Morocco) FAR Rabbat | Undisclosed | |
| 7 August 2021 | Anthony Sadin | RWDM47 | RE Virton | Undisclosed | |
| 8 August 2021 | (Japan) Daichi Hayashi | (Japan) Sagan Tosu | Sint-Truidense V.V. | Undisclosed | |
| 8 August 2021 | (France) Ruben Droehnlé | (Czech Republic) FK Teplice | RE Virton | Free | |
| 8 August 2021 | (Italy) Nicholas Rizzo | (Italy) Genoa C.F.C. | RE Virton | Loan | |
| 9 August 2021 | (Iceland) Aron Sigurðarson | Royale Union Saint-Gilloise | (Denmark) AC Horsens | Undisclosed | |
| 9 August 2021 | (Ivory Coast) Anderson Niangbo | KAA Gent | (Austria) SK Sturm Graz | Loan | |
| 9 August 2021 | (Wales) Rabbi Matondo | (Germany) FC Schalke 04 | Cercle Brugge | Loan | |
| 9 August 2021 | Leroy Labylle | R.F.C. Seraing (1904) | (Netherlands) MVV Maastricht | Free | |
| 10 August 2021 | (Netherlands) Michel Vlap | RSC Anderlecht | (Netherlands) FC Twente | Loan | |
| 10 August 2021 | (Japan) Kaoru Mitoma | (England) Brighton & Hove Albion | Royale Union Saint-Gilloise | Loan | |
| 10 August 2021 | (Brazil) Jhonny Lucas | Sint-Truidense V.V. | (Brazil) Londrina Esporte Clube | Loan | |
| 10 August 2021 | Loïc Ritière | KV Kortrijk | Royal FC Mandel United | Free | |
| 10 August 2021 | (Bosnia and Herzegovina) Nihad Mujakić | KV Kortrijk | Waasland Beveren | Loan | |
| 10 August 2021 | Benjamin Van Durmen | Royal Excel Mouscron | (Romania) FC U Craiova 1948 | Undisclosed | |
| 11 August 2021 | (Ukraine) Yevhenii Makarenko | RSC Anderlecht | (Hungary) Fehérvár FC | Undisclosed | |
| 11 August 2021 | (Scotland) Lawrence Shankland | (Scotland) Dundee United F.C. | K Beerschot VA | Undisclosed | |
| 11 August 2021 | (Germany) Herdi Bukusu | (Germany) Hamburg SV | RE Virton | Undisclosed | |
| 11 August 2021 | (Germany) Noah Awassi | (Germany) FC Schalke 04 | RE Virton | Undisclosed | |
| 11 August 2021 | (Brazil) Lucas Ribeiro Costa | R. Charleroi S.C. | Royal Excel Mouscron | Loan | |
| 11 August 2021 | Jason Bourdouxhe | (Netherlands) FC Eindhoven | Royal Excel Mouscron | Free | |
| 11 August 2021 | (France) Frédéric Duplus | OH Leuven | Royal Excel Mouscron | Free | |
| 11 August 2021 | Calvin Dekuyper | Cercle Brugge | Royal Excel Mouscron | Free | |
| 11 August 2021 | (Israel) Eden Shamir | Standard Liège | (Israel) Maccabi Tel Aviv F.C. | Loan | |
| 12 August 2021 | (Slovenia) Milan Tučić | OH Leuven | (Japan) Hokkaido Consadole Sapporo | Undisclosed | |
| 12 August 2021 | (England) Femi Seriki | (England) Sheffield United F.C. | K Beerschot VA | Loan | |
| 12 August 2021 | (France) Marc Olivier Doue | (Netherlands) PEC Zwolle | RE Virton | Free | |
| 12 August 2021 | (Algeria) Abdelkahar Kadri | (Algeria) Paradou AC | KV Kortrijk | Undisclosed | |
| 12 August 2021 | (Nigeria) David Okereke | Club Brugge | (Italy) Venezia F.C. | Loan | |
| 12 August 2021 | (Ghana) Osman Bukari | KAA Gent | (France) FC Nantes | Loan | |
| 13 August 2021 | Thomas Van den Keybus | Club Brugge | KVC Westerlo | Loan | |
| 13 August 2021 | (Spain) Álex Millán | (Spain) Villarreal CF | Cercle Brugge | Loan | |
| 14 August 2021 | Radja Nainggolan | (Italy) Inter Milan | R Antwerp FC | Free | |
| 14 August 2021 | Gaëtan Hendrickx | R. Charleroi S.C. | K.M.S.K. Deinze | Undisclosed | |
| 16 August 2021 | (Kosovo) Altin Kryeziu | (Italy) Torino F.C. | RE Virton | Loan | |
| 16 August 2021 | (France) Imad Faraj | Royal Excel Mouscron | (Cyprus) AEK Larnaca FC | Undisclosed | |
| 17 August 2021 | (France) Vincent Koziello | (Germany) 1. FC Köln | KV Oostende | Free | |
| 18 August 2021 | (Germany) Timon Wellenreuther | RSC Anderlecht | (Netherlands) Willem II | Loan | |
| 18 August 2021 | (Tunisia) Hamza Rafia | (Italy) Juventus FC | Standard Liège | Loan | |
| 19 August 2021 | Daouda Peeters | (Italy) Juventus FC | Standard Liège | Loan | |
| 19 August 2021 | (Cameroon) Serge Tabekou | Royal Excel Mouscron | (Turkey) Manisa FK | Loan | |
| 19 August 2021 | (Cameroon) Francis Junior Zé | Royal Excel Mouscron | R.F.C. Tournai | Free | |
| 19 August 2021 | Alan Gyde | Royal Excel Mouscron | R.F.C. Tournai | Free | |
| 20 August 2021 | (United States) Owen Otasowie | (England) Wolverhampton Wanderers F.C. | Club Brugge | Undisclosed | |
| 20 August 2021 | (France) Ruben Providence | (Italy) A.S. Roma | Club Brugge | Loan | |
| 20 August 2021 | (Australia) Daniel Arzani | (England) Manchester City | Lommel S.K. | Loan | |
| 20 August 2021 | Artuur Zutterman | Cercle Brugge | Royal FC Mandel United | Undisclosed | |
| 21 August 2021 | (Nigeria) Valentine Ozornwafor | (Turkey) Galatasaray S.K. | R. Charleroi S.C. | Loan | |
| 21 August 2021 | (Ivory Coast) Christian Kouamé | (Italy) ACF Fiorentina | RSC Anderlecht | Loan | |
| 22 August 2021 | Alexis De Sart | R Antwerp FC | OH Leuven | Loan | |
| 23 August 2021 | (Japan) Taichi Hara | (Spain) Deportivo Alavés | Sint-Truidense V.V. | Undisclosed | |
| 24 August 2021 | (Bolivia) Ramiro Vaca | (Bolivia) The Strongest | K Beerschot VA | Undisclosed | |
| 24 August 2021 | (France) Thomas Henry | OH Leuven | (Italy) Venezia F.C. | Undisclosed | |
| 24 August 2021 | (Norway) Michael Clinton Opeyemi | (Norway) Vålerenga Fotball | Club Brugge | Undisclosed | |
| 24 August 2021 | (Serbia) Darko Lemajić | (Latvia) FK RFS | KAA Gent | Undisclosed | |
| 24 August 2021 | (England) Ike Ugbo | (England) Chelsea FC | KRC Genk | Undisclosed | |
| 24 August 2021 | Gaël Kakudji | R.F.C. Seraing (1922) | R. Olympic Charleroi | Free | |
| 25 August 2021 | (France) Ismaël Sow | (France) FC Girondins de Bordeaux | Royal Excel Mouscron | Loan | |
| 25 August 2021 | (Switzerland) Dereck Kutesa | (France) Stade de Reims | SV Zulte Waregem | Loan | |
| 25 August 2021 | (Latvia) Eduards Daškevičs | RSC Anderlecht | (Norway) Hamarkameratene | Free | |
| 25 August 2021 | Adel Bourard | R.F.C. Seraing (1922) | RRC Stockay-Warfusée | Free | |
| 26 August 2021 | Arthur Theate | KV Oostende | (Italy) Bologna F.C. 1909 | Loan | |
| 26 August 2021 | Steve Yanken | Standard Liège | (Italy) Cagliari Calcio | Free | |
| 26 August 2021 | (France) Karim Zedadka | (Italy) S.S.C. Napoli | R. Charleroi S.C. | Loan | |
| 26 August 2021 | (Italy) Dario Del Fabro | (Italy) Juventus FC | R.F.C. Seraing (1904) | Loan | |
| 27 August 2021 | Dorian Dessoleil | R. Charleroi S.C. | Royal Antwerp F.C. | Undisclosed | |
| 27 August 2021 | Pierre Dwomoh | K.R.C. Genk | Royal Antwerp F.C. | Undisclosed | |
| 27 August 2021 | (Morocco) Sofian Chakla | (Spain) Villarreal CF | OH Leuven | Free | |
| 27 August 2021 | (Nigeria) Jesse Sekidika | (Turkey) Galatasaray S.K. | OH Leuven | Loan | |
| 27 August 2021 | (Ghana) Kamal Sowah | (England) Leicester City | Club Brugge | Undisclosed | |
| 27 August 2021 | (Turkey) Oğuz Kağan Güçtekin | (Turkey) Fenerbahçe S.K. | KVC Westerlo | Loan | |
| 27 August 2021 | (North Macedonia) Erdon Daci | (Turkey) Konyaspor | KVC Westerlo | Loan | |
| 28 August 2021 | (Brazil) Wesley Moraes | (England) Aston Villa | Club Brugge | Loan | |
| 28 August 2021 | (Ivory Coast) Simon Deli | Club Brugge | (Turkey) Adana Demirspor | Undisclosed | |
| 28 August 2021 | Elias Cobbaut | RSC Anderlecht | (Italy) Parma Calcio 1913 | Loan | |
| 28 August 2021 | Joseph Nonge Boende | RSC Anderlecht | (Italy) Juventus FC | Undisclosed | |
| 28 August 2021 | (Guinea) Ibrahima Bah | Royale Union Saint-Gilloise | (Spain) Racing de Santander | Undisclosed | |
| 29 August 2021 | Maximiliano Caufriez | Sint-Truidense V.V. | (Russia) FC Spartak Moscow | Undisclosed | |
| 29 August 2021 | (Morocco) Sofiane Bouzian | KV Mechelen | K.V.K. Tienen | Free | |
| 30 August 2021 | (Mauritania) Houssen Abderrahmane | RWDM47 | Francs Borains | Free | |
| 30 August 2021 | Bryan Limbombe | KRC Genk | (Netherlands) Roda JC Kerkrade | Undisclosed | |
| 30 August 2021 | Dario Van den Buijs | K Beerschot VA | (Netherlands) RKC Waalwijk | Undisclosed | |
| 30 August 2021 | (Senegal) Youssouph Badji | Club Brugge | (France) Stade Brestois 29 | Loan | |
| 30 August 2021 | (Democratic Republic of the Congo) Glody Likonza | (Democratic Republic of the Congo) TP Mazembe | Standard Liège | Loan | |
| 30 August 2021 | (Nigeria) Jordan Attah Kadiri | Lommel S.K. | (Norway) Strømsgodset Toppfotball | Loan | |
| 31 August 2021 | Nikola Pejčić | Waasland-Beveren | Francs Borains | Free | |
| 31 August 2021 | (Cameroon) Frank Boya | Royal Antwerp F.C. | SV Zulte Waregem | Loan | |
| 31 August 2021 | (France) Teddy Chevalier | KV Kortrijk | Royal Excel Mouscron | Undisclosed | |
| 31 August 2021 | (Morocco) Rachid Alioui | (France) Angers SCO | KV Kortrijk | Undisclosed | |
| 31 August 2021 | (France) Didier Desprez | (France) Paris FC | RSC Charleroi | Undisclosed | |
| 31 August 2021 | Chris Kalulika | RSC Anderlecht | KV Mechelen | Free | |
| 31 August 2021 | (Morocco) Anas Nanah | (Morocco) Mohammed VI Football Academy | K.A.S. Eupen | Loan | |
| 31 August 2021 | (Morocco) Mohammed Essahel | (Morocco) Mohammed VI Football Academy | K.A.S. Eupen | Loan | |
| 31 August 2021 | (Argentina) Lisandro Magallán | (Netherlands) AFC Ajax | RSC Anderlecht | Loan | |
| 31 August 2021 | Ilombe Mboyo | Sint-Truidense V.V. | KAA Gent | Undisclosed | |
| 31 August 2021 | Stéphane Mukala | Standard Liège | UR La Louvière Centre | Free | |
| 31 August 2021 | (Morocco) Amine Ghazoini | (Italy) Ascoli Calcio | RE Virton | Loan | |
| 31 August 2021 | (France) Ibrahim Karamoko | (Italy) Torino F.C. | RE Virton | Loan | |
| 31 August 2021 | (Tunisia) Nader Ghandri | K.V.C. Westerlo | (Tunisia) Club Africain | Undisclosed | |
| 31 August 2021 | (France) Fabien Antunes | K.V.C. Westerlo | (Greece) Panetolikos F.C. | Free | |
| 31 August 2021 | (Luxembourg) Yan Bouché | Racing FC Union Luxembourg | Royal Excel Mouscron | Undisclosed | |
| 31 August 2021 | Jossue Dolet | KV Mechelen | (Netherlands) Helmond Sport | Loan | |
| 31 August 2021 | Senne Ceulemans | KV Mechelen | K.V.V. Thes Sport Tessenderlo | Loan | |
| 31 August 2021 | (Togo) Loïc Bessilé | (France) FC Girondins de Bordeaux | RSC Charleroi | Undisclosed | |
| 31 August 2021 | (Ivory Coast) Kader Keïta | K.V.C. Westerlo | (Switzerland) FC Sion | Loan | |
| 31 August 2021 | Alexandre Ippolito | Royal Excel Mouscron | (Luxembourg) FC Wiltz 71 | Free | |
| 31 August 2021 | (Burundi) Saido Berahino | SV Zulte Waregem | (England) Sheffield Wednesday F.C. | Undisclosed | |
| 31 August 2021 | (Ghana) Mohammed Dauda | RSC Anderlecht | (Spain) FC Cartagena | Loan | |
| 31 August 2021 | (Sierra Leone) Mustapha Bundu | RSC Anderlecht | (Denmark) Aarhus Gymnastikforening | Loan | |
| 31 August 2021 | (Serbia) Luka Adžić | RSC Anderlecht | (Netherlands) PEC Zwolle | Free | |
| 31 August 2021 | Deart Bajraktari | R.F.C. Seraing (1922) | RFC Meux | Free | |
| 31 August 2021 | (Senegal) Moussa Gueye | R.F.C. Seraing (1922) | URSL Visé | Free | |
| 31 August 2021 | Aristote Nkaka | RSC Anderlecht | Waasland-Beveren | Loan | |
| 31 August 2021 | (Nigeria) Stephen Odey | KRC Genk | (Denmark) Randers FC | Loan | |
| 31 August 2021 | (Guinea) Sory Kaba | (Denmark) FC Midtjylland | OH Leuven | Loan | |
| 31 August 2021 | (Ivory Coast) Thomas Touré | (France) Angers SCO | RE Virton | Free | |
| 31 August 2021 | (France) Yanis Castagne | (Spain) CD Castellón | RE Virton | Free | |
| 31 August 2021 | (Ghana) Jonah Osabutey | (Germany) SV Werder Bremen | KV Kortrijk | Undisclosed | |
| 31 August 2021 | (France) Niels Nkounkou | (England) Everton F.C. | Standard Liège | Loan | |
| 31 August 2021 | (Norway) Antonio Nusa | (Norway) Stabæk Fotball | Club Brugge | Undisclosed | |
| 31 August 2021 | (Colombia) José Izquierdo | (England) Brighton & Hove Albion | Club Brugge | Free | |
| 31 August 2021 | (Cape Verde) Steven Fortès | (France) RC Lens | KV Oostende | Loan | |
| 31 August 2021 | (France) Faitout Maouassa | (France) Stade Rennais F.C. | Club Brugge | Undisclosed | |
| 31 August 2021 | (Ivory Coast) William Togui | KV Mechelen | RWDM47 | Loan | |
| 31 August 2021 | (Scotland) Jack Hendry | KV Oostende | Club Brugge | Undisclosed | |
| 31 August 2021 | (Ivory Coast) Aboubakar Keita | RSC Charleroi | RWDM47 | Loan | |
| 31 August 2021 | (Algeria) Billel Messaoudi | (Algeria) JS Saoura | KV Kortrijk | Loan | |
| 31 August 2021 | (Ivory Coast) Idrissa Doumbia | (Portugal) Sporting CP | SV Zulte Waregem | Loan | |
| 31 August 2021 | (Mauritania) Souleymane Anne | (Portugal) C.D. Tondela | RE Virton | Free | |
| 31 August 2021 | (Tanzania) Mbwana Samatta | (Turkey) Fenerbahçe S.K. | Royal Antwerp F.C. | Loan | |
| 31 August 2021 | (Denmark) Victor Torp | (Denmark) FC Midtjylland | KV Kortrijk | Loan | |
| 31 August 2021 | Brice Verkerken | KV Kortrijk | S.C. Eendracht Aalst | Loan | |
| 31 August 2021 | Louis Verstraete | Royal Antwerp F.C. | Waasland-Beveren | Undisclosed | |
| 31 August 2021 | Preben Stiers | KV Oostende | (Netherlands) FC Den Bosch | Loan | |
| 31 August 2021 | Mohamed Berte | KV Oostende | (Netherlands) FC Den Bosch | Loan | |
| 31 August 2021 | Mathieu De Smet | SV Zulte Waregem | (Netherlands) TOP Oss | Loan | |
| 31 August 2021 | (Guinea) Malick Keita | KV Oostende | Sint-Truidense V.V. | Free | |
| 31 August 2021 | Jo Gilis | OH Leuven | K.S.K. Heist | Loan | |
| 31 August 2021 | Alexander Quadflieg | KV Mechelen | K.S.K. Heist | Free | |
| 31 August 2021 | Reian Meddour | RWDM47 | K.S.K. Heist | Free | |
| 31 August 2021 | Bob Desmet | KV Kortrijk | F.C. Gullegem | Free | |
| 31 August 2021 | (Iceland) Rúnar Alex Rúnarsson | (England) Arsenal FC | OH Leuven | Loan | |
| 31 August 2021 | (Ukraine) Mykola Kukharevych | (France) ES Troyes AC | OH Leuven | Loan | |
| 31 August 2021 | (Ecuador) Moisés Caicedo | (England) Brighton & Hove Albion | K Beerschot VA | Loan | |
| 31 August 2021 | (Uruguay) Mauricio Lemos | (Turkey) Fenerbahçe S.K. | K Beerschot VA | Loan | |
| 31 August 2021 | (Nigeria) Cyriel Dessers | KRC Genk | (Netherlands) Feyenoord | Loan | |
| 31 August 2021 | (Senegal) Amadou Sagna | Club Brugge | (France) Stade Briochin | Loan | |
| 31 August 2021 | (Argentina) Matías Silvestre | Royal Excel Mouscron | (Italy) Virtus Entella | Loan | |
| 1 Sep 2021 | (Nigeria) Blessing Eleke | K Beerschot VA | (Turkey) Gençlerbirliği S.K. | Loan | |
| 1 Sep 2021 | (Equatorial Guinea) Basilio Ndong | K.V.C. Westerlo | (Norway) IK Start | Loan | |
| 1 Sep 2021 | (France) Alimami Gory | Cercle Brugge | (France) Paris FC | Loan | |
| 2 Sep 2021 | Enes Sağlık | Royal Excel Mouscron | (Turkey) Menemenspor | Free | |
| 2 Sep 2021 | Halim Timassi | Free Agent | Royale Union Saint-Gilloise | Free | |
| 2 Sep 2021 | Lucas Defise | Free Agent | Royale Union Saint-Gilloise | Free | |
| 3 Sep 2021 | (Germany) Toni Leistner | Free Agent | Sint-Truidense V.V. | Free | |
| 6 Sep 2021 | (France) Thomas Robert | Free Agent | Royal Excel Mouscron | Free | |
| 6 Sep 2021 | (United States) Kenny Saief | RSC Anderlecht | (Israel) F.C. Ashdod | Undisclosed | |
| 6 Sep 2021 | (Cameroon) Didier Lamkel Zé | Royal Antwerp F.C. | (Slovakia) FC DAC 1904 Dunajská Streda | Loan | |
| 6 Sep 2021 | (Ivory Coast) Alan Bidi | Free Agent | RE Virton | Free | |
| 7 Sep 2021 | (Germany) Robert Bauer | Free Agent | Sint-Truidense V.V. | Free | |
| 7 Sep 2021 | Geronimo De Ridder | Free Agent | RE Virton | Free | |
