= Jean-Adrien =

Jean-Adrien is a French masculine given name. Notable people with the name include:

== People ==
- Jean-Adrien Guignet (1816–1854), French orientalist painter
- Jean-Adrien Mercier (1899–1995), French illustrator and poster artist

== See also ==
- Jean Adrien Bigonnet (1755–1832), French politician
- Jean Adrien Vanovason, Malagasy politician
- Adrien Philippe (1815–1894; born Jean Adrien Philippe), French watchmaker and businessman
- Jean Jules Jusserand (1855–1932; Jean Adrien Antoine Jules Jusserand), French author and diplomat
- Jean Lecanuet (1920–1993; Jean Adrien François Lecanuet), French politician
- Jean-Marthe-Adrien l'Hermite (1766–1826), French Navy officer
- Adrien-Jean
- JA (disambiguation)
