= Blin (surname) =

Blin is a surname of uncertain, possibly French, origin.

- Adrien-Michel-Hyacinthe Blin de Sainmore (1733–1807), French poet, playwright and historian
- Alexis Blin
- Anne-Laure Blin (born 1983), French politician
- Arnaud Blin (1960-), French historian and political scientist
- Benoit Blin, French pastry chef
- François-Pierre Blin (1756–1834), French physician, député aux États généraux de 1789
- Françoise Blin de Bourdon
- Gustavus Blin Wright
- Jürgen Blin
- Joseph Blin (1764–1834), French politician, father-in-law of François Désiré Roulin
- Juan Allende-Blin
- Mathieu Blin (1977-), French rugby player
- Roger Blin (1907–1984), French actor
- Władysław Blin, Bishop of the diocese of Vitebsk, Belarus

== See also ==
- Blinn
