= Jadrien =

Jadrien is a given name. Notable people with the name include:

- Jadrien Steele (born 1974), American actor, author, and film director
- Jadrien Bell, pen name of Christie Golden (born 1963), American author

== See also ==
- Adrien
