= Jacques Pradon =

French playwright

Jacques Pradon, often mistakenly called Nicolas Pradon (21 January 1644 – 14 January 1698), was a French playwright. Early in his career, he was helped by Pierre Corneille and was introduced to the salons at the Hôtel de Nevers (Note: This could have been either the Hôtel de Nevers (left bank) or the Hôtel de Nevers (rue de Richelieu).)and the Hôtel de Bouillon by Madame Deshoulières.

Pradon was born in Rouen and is the author of eight tragedies: Pyrame et Thisbé (1674) (see Pyramus and Thisbe), Tamerlan, ou la mort de Bajazet (1676), Phèdre et Hippolyte (1677), La Troade (1679), Statira (1680), Regulus (1688), Germanicus (1694) and Scipion (1697). His plays enjoyed a certain limited success, but were severely judged by his rival Jean Racine, who also wrote tragedies based on the stories of Bajazet (Bayezid I) and Phaedra ("The only difference between Pradon and me is that I know how to write", Racine is reported to have said), and Racine's supporter Nicolas Boileau. This rivalry was particularly intense when Pradon brought out his Phèdre et Hippolyte at the same time as Racine's Phèdre (the writers Donneau de Visé and Adrien-Thomas Perdou de Subligny both took Pradon's side), and throughout his life Pradon wrote several attacks on Boileau. He died in Paris.

Pradon's plays have been largely denigrated by modern critics, both for his lack of imagination or historical awareness and his utter adherence to the three classical unities and the bienséances (proprieties) of French classical theatre. For example, to avoid depicting a stepmother in love with her stepson, Pradon made Phèdre merely Theseus' fiancée. Pradon's 14th-century Mongol Tamerlan walks and acts like a gentleman of the 17th-century French court.

== Sources ==
- Bussom, Thomas W. (1922). A rival of Racine: Pradon. His life and dramatic works. Paris: Édouard Champion.
- (in French) Patrick Dandrey, ed. Dictionnaire des lettres françaises: Le XVIIe siècle. Collection: La Pochothèque. Paris: Fayard, 1996. ISBN 2-253-05664-2
