= Duquesnoy =

Duquesnoy is a surname derived from the Picard commune of Le Quesnoy, and may refer to:

- Adrien Duquesnoy (1759–1808), French political figure during the French Revolution
- Ernest Dominique François Joseph Duquesnoy (1749–1795), Radical French political figure during the French Revolution and brother of Florent Joseph Duquesnoy
- Florent Joseph Duquesnoy (1761–1801), French general during the French Revolution and brother of Ernest Dominique François Joseph Duquesnoy
- François Duquesnoy (1597–1643), Flemish sculptor and son of Jérôme the Elder
- Jérôme Duquesnoy the Elder (c. 1570–c. 1641), Flemish sculptor of the Manneken Pis
- Jérôme Duquesnoy the Younger (1602–1654), Flemish architect and sculptor, son of Jérôme the Elder
- Tom Duquesnoy (born 1993), French mixed martial artist
