= Beuchot =

Beuchot (French: [bøʃo]) is a French surname. Notable people with the surname include:

- Adrien-Jean-Quentin Beuchot (1777–1851), French bibliographer
- Pierre Beuchot (born 1938), French filmmaker
