= Benjamin Laplace =

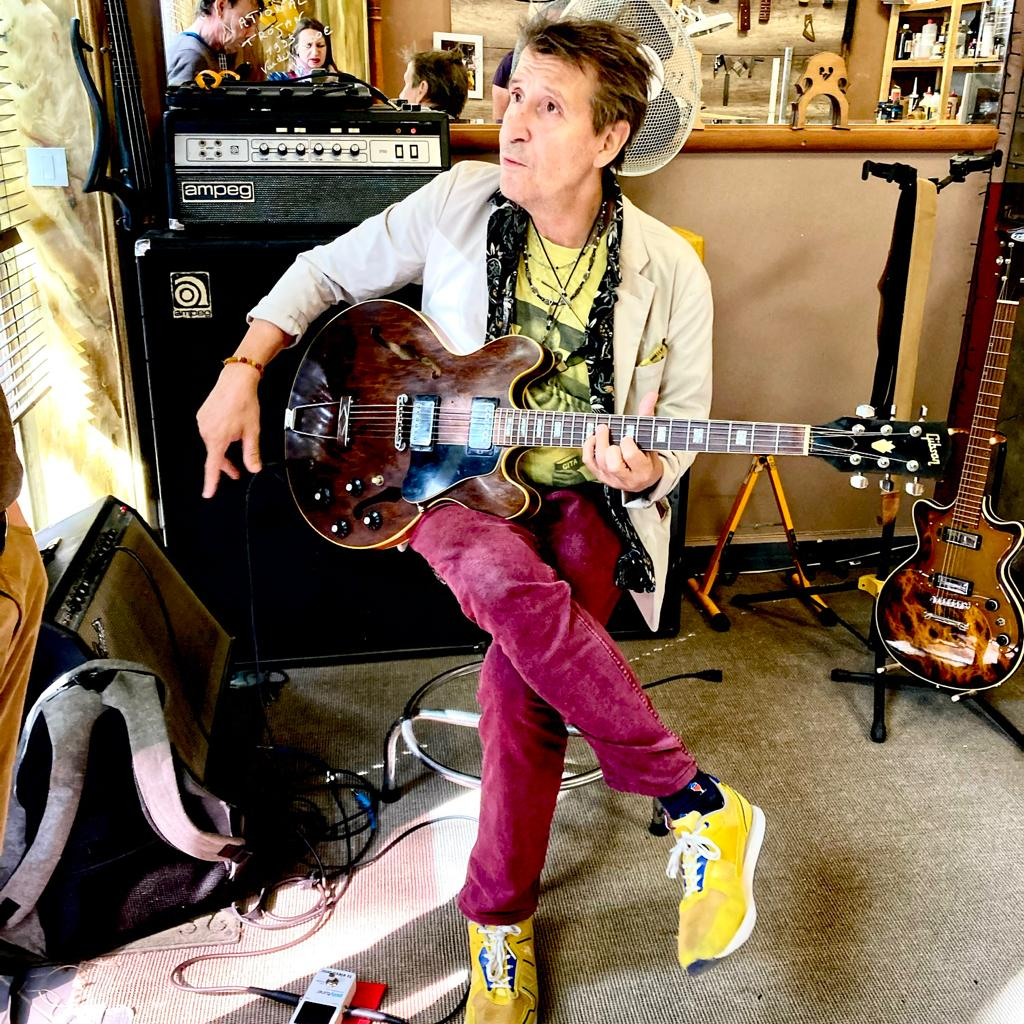
Benjamin Laplace

Benjamin Laplace is a French singer, guitarist, composer, bassist, director and author.

== Biography ==
He began his career at the age of 17 with a group called Mistral born in the village of Saint-Jean-Cap-Ferrat in 1974. In 1976 Mistral move to Paris.

At the age of 20, 1979, they made their first record Sexy Beau : with Sonopresse recorded at the mythical Davout Studios published by EMI Group Limited . Also for EMI they recorded a second album called "Phantom" never released at the time. It appears on only one platform: SoundCloud. But in 2018 CAMÉLÉON RECORD released an Ep 4 vinyl tracks entitled "JUMBO JET" from the album "Phantom". This same label had already released a Mistral title "Les Fils de l'acier" (from the 1st album "Sexy Beau") on a compilation entitled CAMÉLÉON Mistral Thesaurus Volume 2.

Benjamin Laplace acted as lead guitarist, songwriter of the punk rock group Mistral, and did concerts with U2, Talking Heads, INXS, Undertones, Scorpion, Téléphone, and Starshooter. Then in 1982 he founded in London the new wave group Menage à Trois with Jean-Pierre Bruno. During this he collaborated with Prince on the set of Under The Cherry Moon They record in London a 45 rpm "Danger d'emotion / Les amants d'un jour" for the Warner Music Group produced by Nick Straker.

The second record, a single: UNISEX/ Stop l’Amour was record in 1981 by Philips Records published by Warner Chappell Music, Inc.

The group consisted of Belgian Didier Claes on drums, Monegasque Jean Pierre Bruno as singer/writer, Italian Giovanni Sovieri on bass, and Laplace as guitarist and composer. They toured France, Belgium and Switzerland with Scorpions and played at Olympia with Taxi Girl. They were invited in 1981 by Antoine de Caunes and played live their single Unisex. In 1995 he started his own career with album Etat d’Ôm 95.

He founded a new musical concept: NouX, in 2017 with the classical musician Adrien Frasse-Sombet where he plays guitar and act for vocals and Adrien Frasse-Sombet plays cello. Norbert Krief, Raphael Imbert, Fabrice di Falco, also worked for album.

== Music ==
=== Albums ===
S.#	Release date	Album	No. of tracks	Genre	Label	Note
1	Record in 1979	Sexy Beau!	8	Power Rock	EMI	1979 Released vinyl, 2022 released on retailers platforms
2	Recorded in 1980	Phantom	18	Power Rock	EMI	SoundCloud, released in 2017
3	Recorded in 1980	Jumbo Jet Ep	4	Power Rock	Chameleon Records EMI	Vinyl Ep/ album Maxi 45 rpm and platforms
4	Recorded in 1981	Unisex / Stop l’amour	2	Power	Phonogram Warner	Vinyls and platforms
5	Recorded 1995	Etat d''Ôm95	17	Alternative Rock	EMI	1995 Cd. released Platforms retailers in 2022
6	Recorded 2002	Comme	10	Alternative rock	EMI	Cd released in 2010 Retailers platforms 2018
7	2018	Sombres illuminés_We’re All Black Stars	7		Noux!	
8	2023	The blue man sees red in verse	13	Alternative rock		CD sorti in 2023 On the platforms in 2023

=== Singles and EPs ===
Laplace has produced many signals and EPs. Following are a few selected ones.

Year	Song	Note
2023	Les Mômes n'aiment pas la Lose	
2023	Trop de peine trop de larmes	
2023	Je ne connais rien aux Mandarines	
2022	Best Friends' dreams	
2022	Bump – Bump (Radio Edit)	
2022	How Strong My Love is	
