= Blinn =

- Alice Blinn (1889–1982) American educator, home efficiency expert, and magazine editor
- Chester Blinn Clapp (1883–?) American screenwriter
- Christian Blinn, namesake of Blinn College in Brenham, Texas
- Clara Blinn (1847–1868), American settler
- Edmund Blinn of Edmund Blinn House
- Erica Blinn, American rock artist
- Genevieve Blinn (1874–1956), Canadian actress
- George Blinn Francis (1883–1967) was a U.S. representative from New York.
- Henry Clay Blinn (1824–1905) American Shaker leader, writer, and artist
- Holbrook Blinn (1872–1928) American stage and film actor.
- James Andrus Blinn Stone (1810–1888) was a minister, professor, and school administrator
- Jarvis Blinn (1836–1862), American military commander
- Jim Blinn (born 1949), American computer scientist
- William Blinn (1937–2020), American screenwriter and television producer

== See also ==
- Blin (surname)
