= Adrien Quiret de Margency =

French officer of the Maison militaire du roi de France, writer and Encyclopédiste

Adrien Quiret de Margency also Adrien Cuyret de Margency (1727 – c. 1802) was an 18th-century French officer of the Maison militaire du roi de France (Gentilhomme ordinaire de la chambre du roi), writer and Encyclopédiste.

== Biography ==
Quiret de Margency was the son of Adrien Cuyret (d. 1744) and Marie Madeleine d'Hocquinquant (d. 1761), married since 4 May 1718. In 1731, the father acquired in the town of Margency a manor and bailiwick of the previous owners for 57,000 livres. Margency is a commune of Val-d'Oise and possibly Adrien Quiret de Margency's birthplace

He often frequented the salons of Paris inspired by the philosophie des Lumières, where he could meet Baron d'Holbach, also called the Coterie holbachique or that of Louise d'Épinay.. He had a friendly relation with Jean-Jacques Rousseau.

De Margency wrote some articles for the sixth and seventh volumes of the Encyclopédie by Denis Diderot: Faveurs, Fidélité, Fleurette and Galanterie.

In 1761, de Margency was subject to a creative crisis similar to that of an experienced colleague, Joseph-François-Édouard de Corsembleu. He proposed marriage to his mistress Marie Madeleine de Brémond d'Ars, marquise de Verdelin (1728-1810), who was a widower since 1763.

== Selected works ==
- La fidélité en amour n'est pas la constance, c'est une vertu plus délicate, plus scrupuleuse et plus rare. Citation d'Adrien Quiret de Margency; Mémoires 1759.
- Aimer d'un amour sincère pour demeurer fidèle. Citation d'Adrien Quiret de Margency; Mémoires 1759

== Bibliography ==
- Alexandre Nicolon; Claude Collineau; Bernard Deü: Histoire de Margency : 650 ans d'histoire locale, 200 ans d'histoire communale. Saint-Ouen-l'aumône, Valhermeil, 2003. ISBN 978-2-913328-46-4
- Frank Arthur Kafker: The encyclopedists as individuals: a biographical dictionary of the authors of the Encyclopédie. Oxford, Studies on Voltaire and the eighteenth Century, 1988, ISBN 978-0-7294-0368-9, S. 246-7
