= Adrienn =

Adrienn is a Hungarian feminine given name which may refer to:

- Adrienn Bende (born 1985), Hungarian racing driver and model
- Adrienn Csőke (born 1973), Hungarian Woman International Master (chess)
- Adrienn Hegedűs (born 1977), Hungarian former tennis player
- Adrienn Henczné Deák (1890–1956) was a Hungarian painter
- Adrienn Hormay (born 1971), Hungarian fencer
- Adrienn Kocsis (born 1973), Hungarian-born Peruvian former badminton player
- Adrienn Nagy (born 2001), Hungarian tennis player
- Adrienn Nyeste (born 1978), Hungarian gymnast
- Adrienn Orbán (born 1986), Hungarian handballer
- Adrienn Szarka (born 1991), Hungarian handballer
- Adrienn Tóth (born 1990), Hungarian pentathlete
- Adrienn Varga (born 1980), Hungarian former artistic gymnast

== See also ==
- Adrienne
- Adrianne
