= Jean Adrien Vanovason =

Malagasy politician

Dr. Jean Adrien Vanovason is a Malagasy politician. A member of the National Assembly of Madagascar, he was elected as a member of the Tiako I Madagasikara party in the 2007 Malagasy parliamentary elections. He was reelected in 2014. He represents the constituency of Vangaindrano.

He lost his seat in the elections of 2019.
