= Adrienne Gray =

American make up artist

- Occupations: Political commentator blogger make-up artist
- Spouse: John Gray IV
- Children: 2

Adrienne Gray is an American make-up artist and former political commentator.

== Early life ==
Gray was raised by a working mother and attended Catholic schools.

== Career ==
Gray was a political commentator and regular panelist on FOX News @ Night, Newsmax, and WTTG. She presented conservative talking points, often discussing far-right social movements including the "tradwife" social media trend. Gray also had a political blog called Pop Culture On The Hill. She left her television career in 2026 to pursue a career in makeup.

Since 2026, Gray became a make-up artist for prominent Republican women including White House Press Secretary Karoline Leavitt, Bettina Trump, and Lara Trump. She was hired to do Lara Trump's makeup for a White House state dinner honoring King Charles III and Queen Camilla during their state visit to the United States in April 2026. Gray taught a masterclass on make-up for Republican women at Trump National Golf Course in Washington, D.C.

== Personal life ==
She married John Gray IV, founder and CEO of the Graystone Group, in 2023. They have two sons.
