= Adrien Duvillard =

Adrien Duvillard may refer to:

- Adrien Duvillard (alpine skier born 1934) (1934–2017), French alpine skier
- Adrien Duvillard (alpine skier born 1969), French former alpine skier
