= Adrienne Krausz =

Hungarian pianist, b. 1967

Adrienne Krausz is a Hungarian pianist.

The winner of the 1989 Cincinnati World Competition while a student at the Ferenc Liszt Academy, she took part at the 1992 and 1993 Montecarlo Masters, reaching the finals. Soon afterwards she was engaged by Georg Solti for a European tour with the Tonhalle Orchester Zürich; she has performed internationally since. Subsequently, she took part in both posthumous homages to Solti in Italy (October'97) and England (February'98). She has recorded for Hungaroton.

Selected performance venues - Barbican Centre, Carnegie Hall, Cité de la Musique, Amsterdam Concertgebouw, Munich's Herkulessaal, Lincoln Center for the Performing Arts, Brussels' Palais des Beaux Arts, Paris' Théâtre de la Ville.

Sir Georg Solti immediately engaged Miss Krausz for a European tour with the Tonhalle Orchestra of Zürich, following an audition. In the last interview he gave to the English Magazine “Classic FM” Solti specifically mentioned her as a young pianist about whom he was “extremely enthusiastic, and I very much hope to help her in her career.” Following this, Sir George introduced Miss Krausz to the Chimay Foundation Competition in Brussels where she won the first prize by unanimous decision of the jury. She was the only pianist to be invited to perform in the Tributes to Sir Georg Solti presented in Italy and in London. Since then, Adrienne Krausz continues to impress the music world with each subsequent performance.

Born in Hungary, Miss Krausz started the piano at the age of nine and in 1990 graduated from the Franz Liszt Academy in Budapest, where her teachers were György Nádor, György Kurtág and Ferenc Rados. She has also studied with Yvonne Lefébure and Lívia Rév. Since 1991 she lives in Paris.

Iván Fischer and his Budapest Festival Orchestra invited her to open the Ascona Festival (2004) and the Bemus Festival in Belgrade (2005). She was also invited to play with the London Philharmonic Orchestra, the Philharmonia Orchestra, and the Berliner Symphoniker. She made her debut in Japan with the Tokyo Philharmonic Orchestra in 2001. Some of her prestigious partners and groups were Michael Gielen, Youri Bashmet, Miklós Perényi, Boris Pergamenshikov, Sergej Krylov, the Keller and the Bartók Quartets, the Franz Liszt Chamber Orchestra, etc. With Shlomo Mintz she made frequent recital tours all around the world.

A finalist at the Piano Masters of Monte Carlo in both 1992 and 1993, she has won numerous first prizes in competitions such as the “World Competition” in Cincinnati (Piano USA 1989), the International Piano Competition in Senigallia (Italy 1985) the Hungarian National Piano Competition in Tarhos in 1984 and further prizes in Frankfurt (1987) and in Sydney (1988). Other acknowledgements include the Key of the city of Cincinnati, (Ohio, USA), the “Diamonds of culture” of the city of Miskolc (Hungary), and Grand Prix of the Hungarian Radio. Adrienne has been an invited guest at music festivals like Montpellier, Menton, Monte-Carlo, Schwetzingen, the Mermoz music Festival, Yokohama, Prague, Cracow, Budapest, Stresa, Palma and Sion.

Her Shostakovich recording was chosen as “Indispensable”, in the French music-guide at Fayard edition. In 1996 she was acclaimed by the critics for her interpretation of the complete Preludes of Chopin and Shostakovich brought together on a CD. In 2003, the Hungarian Gramophone Magazine awarded her the prize for the best recording of the year. Adrienne often returns to Hungary to give concerts and has made several recordings for the Hungarian Radio and Television Networks.
