= Adrien Tailhand =

French magistrate and politician (1818–1889)

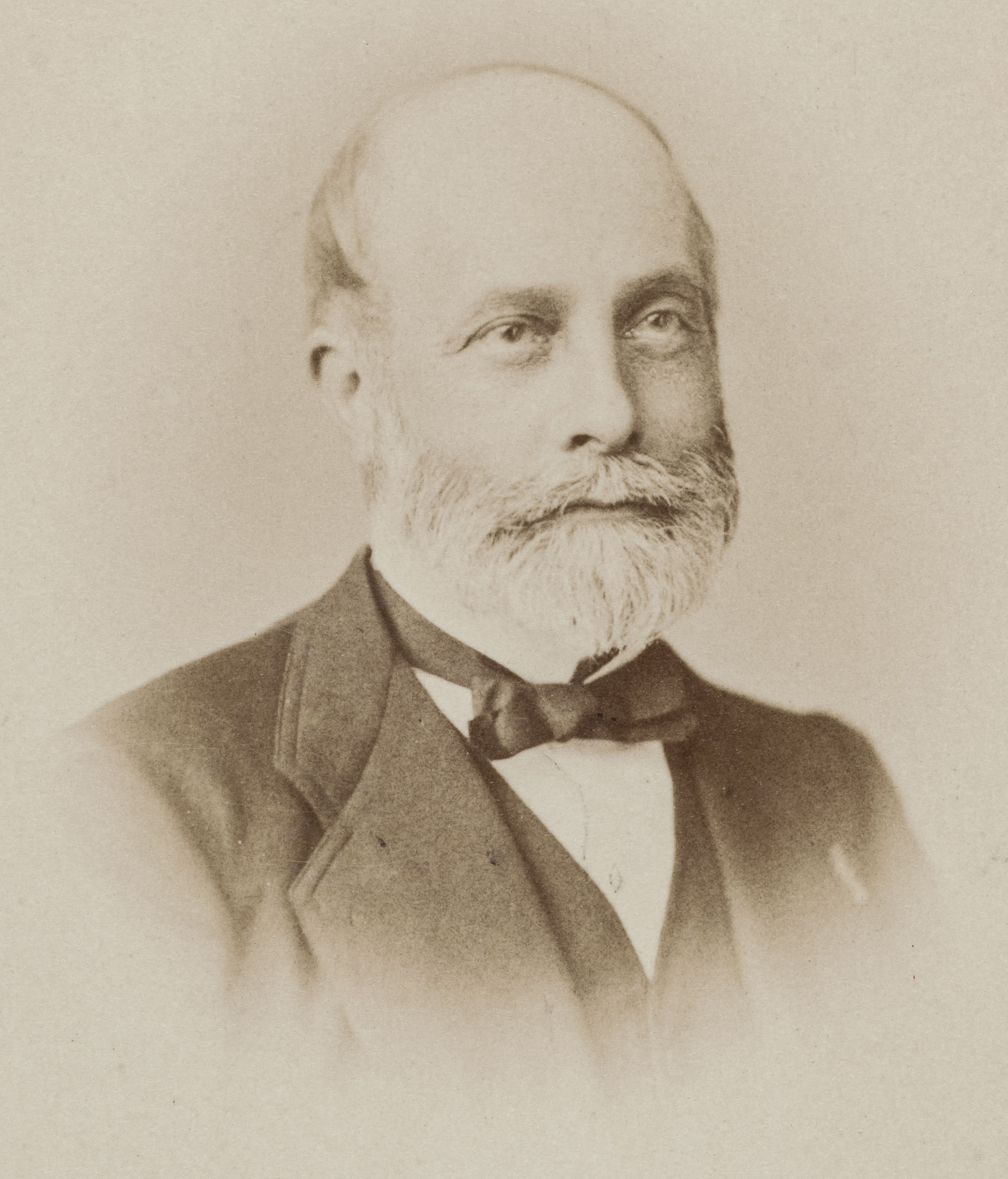
- Tailhand in 1850

Personal details
- Born: 1 July 1818
- Died: 8 October 1889 (aged 71)

Adrien Alfred Tailhand (1 July 1818 – 8 October 1889) was a French lawyer and politician. He was Keeper of the Seals and Minister of Justice from 1894 until 1895 in Ernest Courtot de Cissey's government.
