= Yves Henry =

French pianist (born 1959)

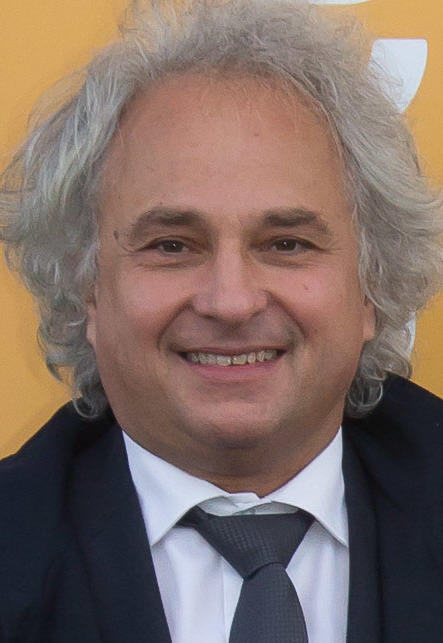
Yves Henry, in Villabé, in December 2014.

Yves Henry (born 2 April 1959) is a French pianist who specializes in romantic music.

He debuted at 13 performing Ludwig van Beethoven's 1st Piano Concerto with the Berlin Philharmonic. After graduating from the Conservatoire de Paris (where he now teaches), he was the first Western European pianist to win the Robert Schumann Competition (1981) and was subsequently prized at the Casadesus Competition (1985).

He performs and records at an international level, and often judges international piano competitions. Currently he serves as the president of the Nohant Festival(fr). Yves Henry is also a music transcriber and a composer, known for his music tale Tubulin. He has been awarded the rank of Officer in the Ordre des Arts et des Lettres by the French government, and has received the silver Gloria Artis Medal for Merit to Culture by the Polish government.
