= Adrien-Joseph =

Adrien-Joseph is a double-barrelled French given name. Notable people with the name include:

- Adrien-Joseph Larribeau (1883–1974), French Roman Catholic priest and bishop in South Korea
- Adrien-Joseph Le Valois d'Orville (1715–1780), French librettist
- Adrien Joseph Prax-Paris (1829–1909), French politician

== See also ==
- Adriaan Jozef Heymans (1839–1921), Belgian impressionist landscape painter
