= Adrienne Horvath =

French politician

Adrienne Horvath (23 March 1925 – 4 July 2012) was a French politician. She represented the 3rd district of Gard in the French National Assembly from 19 March 1978 to 22 May 1981, as a member of the French Communist Party.

She was born in Tuyên Quang in the Tonkin Protectorate, French Indochina (today Vietnam). She was first elected to the assembly in 1978, succeeding Roger Roucaute, also of the Communist party, and was reelected in 1981.

Horvath was mayor of Saint-Martin-de-Valgalgues from 1977 to 1989.

She died at Saint-Martin-de-Valgalgues at the age of 87.
