= Alan Bidi =

Brazilian footballer (born 1995)

Personal information
- Full name: Alan Régis Bidi-Lecadouq
- Date of birth: 19 October 1995 (age 31)
- Height: 1.94 m (6 ft 4 in)
- Position: Centre back

Team information
- Current team: Virton
- Number: 15

Youth career
- –2015: Wealdstone

Senior career*
Years	Team	Apps	(Gls)
2014–2015	Wealdstone	0	(0)
2014	→ Northwood (loan)	1	(0)
2015–2016	Stará Říše	5	(0)
2016–2017	Lusitano	24	(6)
2017–2019	Porto B	24	(1)
2019–2021	Vilafranquense	15	(0)
2021–	Virton	0	(0)
- * Club domestic league appearances and goals as of 15:30, 9 September 2021 (UTC)

Alan Régis Bidi-Lecadouq (born 19 October 1995) is an Ivorian footballer who plays as a defender for Belgian club Virton.

== Career statistics ==
=== Club ===
As of 9 September 2021.

Club	Season	League			National Cup		League Cup		Other		Total	
Club	Season	Division	Apps	Goals	Apps	Goals	Apps	Goals	Apps	Goals	Apps	Goals
Wealdstone	2013–14	Isthmian League	0	0	0	0	–		0	0	0	0
Wealdstone	2014–15	Football Conference	0	0	0	0	–		0	0	0	0
Wealdstone	Total		0	0	0	0	0	0	0	0	0	0
Northwood (loan)	2013–14	Southern Football League	1	0	0	0	–		0	0	1	0
Stará Říše	2015–16	Czech Fourth Division	5	0	0	0	–		0	0	5	0
Lusitano	2016–17	Campeonato de Portugal	24	6	1 (Note: Appearances in the Taça de Portugal)	0	0	0	0	0	25	6
Porto B	2017–18	LigaPro	16	1	–		–		0	0	16	1
Porto B	2018–19	LigaPro	8	0	–		–		0	0	8	0
Porto B	Total		24	1	0	0	0	0	0	0	24	1
Vilafranquense	2019–20	LigaPro	12	0	1	0	–		0	0	13	0
Vilafranquense	2020–21	Liga Portugal 2	3	0	–		–		0	0	3	0
Vilafranquense	Total		15	0	1	0	0	0	0	0	16	0
Virton	2021–22	Proximus League	0	0	0	0	–		0	0	0	0
Career total			66	7	2	0	0	0	0	0	68	7
