= Adrien Gouteyron =

French politician (1933–2020)

Adrien Gouteyron (13 May 1933 – 26 August 2020) was a French politician and a member of the Senate of France. He represented the Haute-Loire department and was a member of the Union for a Popular Movement Party.
