= Bilin =

Bilin may refer to:

- Bilin, Mon State, a town in Mon State in Myanmar
- Bilin Township, whose seat is Bilin, Mon State
- Bilin (biochemistry), a type of biological pigment with a tetrapyrrole structure, for example found in bile
- Bil'in, a Palestinian village in the West Bank
- Bilin or Belin (river), a river in Tuva, Russia
- The Bilen people, an ethnic group which mainly inhabits Eritrea and speaks the Blin language
- The German name for the Czech town of Bílina
