= Marie-Thérèse de Subligny =

French ballerina

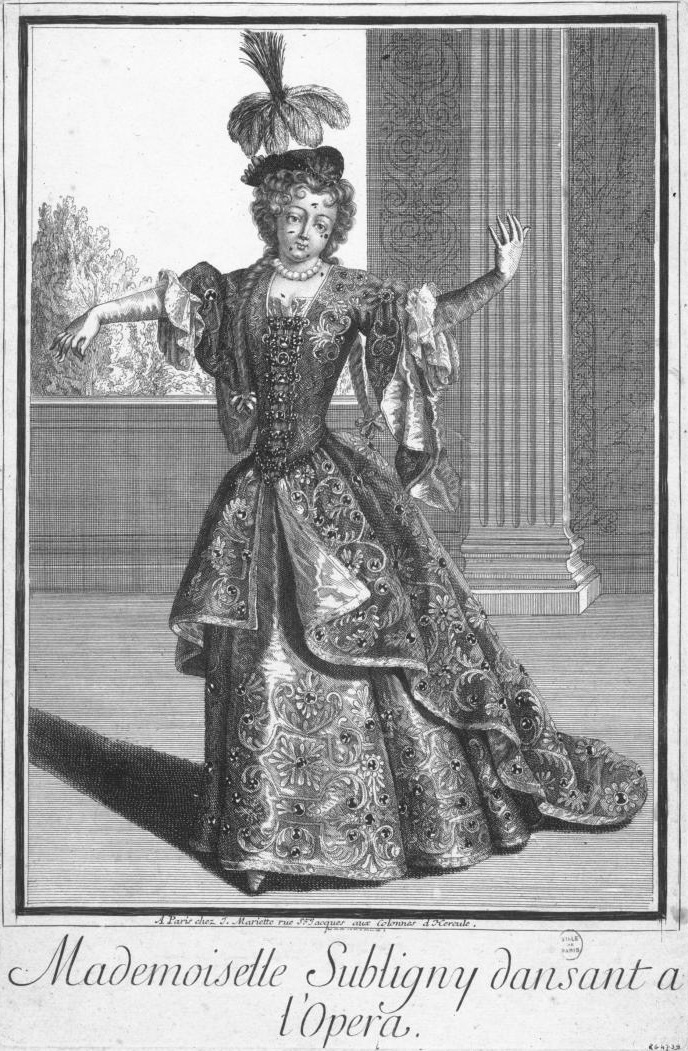
Marie-Thérèse de Subligny

Marie-Thérèse Perdou de Subligny (1666–1735) was a French ballerina. She entered the l'Académie Royale de Musique in 1688, where she succeeded Mademoiselle de Lafontaine as prima ballerina, a position she held until 1707. She appeared mostly in opera ballets of Jean-Baptiste Lully and André Campra. She was the first professional ballerina to appear in England (1702–03). She was seen as one of the Queens of ballet.

== See also ==
- Women in dance
