= Adrien Sathler =

Brazilian-American footballer (born 1992)

Personal information
- Full name: Adrien Sathler
- Date of birth: 1 June 1992 (age 34)
- Place of birth: Rio de Janeiro, Brazil
- Height: 1.78 m (5 ft 10 in)
- Position: Midfielder

Team information
- Current team: Miami Dade FC

Youth career
- Fluminense

Senior career*
Years	Team	Apps	(Gls)
2014	Miami Dade FC		
- * Club domestic league appearances and goals as of May 30, 2014 ‡ National team caps and goals as of May 30, 2014

Adrien Sathler (born 1 June 1992) is a Brazilian-American footballer who plays for Miami Dade FC, as a midfielder.

== Career ==
On May 1, 2014 Sathler signed for Miami Dade FC.
