= Adrien-Michel-Hyacinthe Blin de Sainmore =

French poet, playwright and historian (1733–1807)

Adrien-Michel-Hyacinthe Blin de Sainmore (15 February 1733, in Paris – 26 September 1807, in Paris) was an 18th–century French poet, playwright and historian.

Coming from a family that had been ruined by Law's system, Blin de Sainmore studied at collège du Cardinal-Lemoine, and sought in retirement and study consolation to the rigors of fortune.

He wrote several héroïdes and other poems such as Mort de l’amiral Bing, Sapho à Phaon, Biblis à Caunus, Gabrielle d’Estrées à Henri IV, Calas à sa femme et à ses enfants, la Duchesse de la Vallière, etc.

His poems and one épitre à Racine were gathered in 1774 in 1 vol. In 1769, he gave a collection entitled l’Élite des poésies fugitives, 3 vol. in-12, to which Luneau de Boisjermain added a 4th in 1773. He composed a tragedy entitled Orphanis , which was favorably received, but could not stay in the theater. He made several works, among others a Histoire de Russie, in 2 vol. with illustrations, in-4, and left several handbooks.

He was preparing to give a complete edition of his works when he died. He was a custodian and historian of the archives of ordres de Saint-Michel and du Saint-Esprit. A cofounder of the Société philanthropique, he was appointed royal censor in 1776, and curator at Bibliothèque de l'Arsenal in 1800.

== Works ==
- 1764: Lettre sur la nouvelle édition de Corneille par M. de Voltaire.
- 1768: Héroïdes ou lettres en vers, preceded by a letter by Sautreau de Marsy, Delalain.
- 1768: Lettre de Jean Calas à sa femme et à ses enfans, preceded by épître à M. de de*** sur le sentiment and followed by Lettre de Gabrielle d’Estrées à Henri IV, impr. de S. Jorry.
- 1771: Épître à Racine.
- 1773: Orphanis, tragedy, by M. Blin de Sainmore, premiered by les comédiens ordinaires du Roi, Saturday 25 September 1773, Delalain.
- 1773: Lettre de la duchesse de La Vallière à Louis XIV, précédée d’un abrégé de sa vie, Le Jay.
- 1775: Joachim ou le Triomphe de la piété filiale, drama in three acts and in verse, followed by de la Requête des filles de Salency à la Reine, les libraires associés.
- 1788: Éloge historique de M. Georges-Louis Phélypeaux d'Herbault, ... archevêque de Bourges, Clousier.
- 1797–1799: Histoire de Russie, presented by pictures accompanied by a historical summary;
- 1805: Essai sur la vie de Jean Rotrou.
- Correspondance littéraire de Moscou, presented and et annotated by Eléna Lébédéva; with collaboration of Françoise Weil, Éditions Slatkine, Geneva, 2005.

== Sources ==
- Feller, François-Xavier; Weiss, Charles (1848). Biographie universelle;ou, dictionnaire historique des hommes qui se sont fait un nom par leur génie, leurs talents, leurs vertus, leurs erreurs ou leurs crimes (in French). Vol. 2. Paris: J. Leroux, Jouby. p. 36..
