= Adrien Charles Deshommets de Martainville =

French politician

Adrien Charles Deshommets, marquis de Martainville

Member of the French Parliament for Yvetot
- In office 25 February 1824 – 5 November 1827

Personal details
- Born: 5 May 1783 Rouen, France
- Died: 17 October 1847 (aged 64) Sassetot-le-Mauconduit, France
- Citizenship: French
- Party: Government majority
- Children: François Charles Esmeri Deshommets, marquis de Martainville

Adrien Charles Deshommets de Martainville (5 May 1783 – 17 October 1847) was a French politician.

== Biography ==
Adrien de Martainville was born in Rouen on Monday 5 May 1783. He was the son of Charles Gabriel Deshommets, marquis de Martainville, Colonel of the cavalry (1740–1800), and Françoise Louise Bigot de Sommesnil (1757–1811). In 1813, he became a member of the Administrative Committee of the Hospitals of Rouen. Successful in this business, he was entrusted with the establishment of an annex of hospices in the church of Saint-Yon, helping typhus patients. In 1815, he married Marie Belhomme de Glatigny (1780–1853)

In 1816, he was a member of the General Council of Lower Seine. He was appointed mayor of Rouen on 20 June 1821, when he succeeds Charles Louis Élie Lefebvre. He holds this office until the Revolution of 1830. During his tenure as mayor of Rouen, are built the stone bridge, the monumental cemetery and St. Paul's Church. He was also at the origin of the enlargement of the Hôtel de Ville, the construction of the new Exchange and the Boeildieu Course, the extension of the Rue Royale (now Republic Street) and the creation of charity workshops.

In 1821, he was one of the founders of the savings bank of Rouen. He attended the laying of the first stone of St. Yon asylum on Sunday 25 August 1822.

From 25 February 1824 to 5 November 1827 he was a member of the parliament, representing the Yvetot borough. He sat in the government majority. He was president of the General Council of Lower Seine from 1825 to 1831. In 1830, Martainville was replaced as mayor of Rouen by Henry Barbet. He died in his castle of Sassetot-le-Mauconduit, on Sunday 17 October 1847.

== Distinctions ==
Adrien de Martainville was elected as member of the Central Agricultural Society of Lower Sein in 1820 and as resident member of the Academy of Sciences, Literature and Fine Arts of Rouen in 1820. He was appointed Knight of the Legion of Honor in 1821. Martainville was also peer of France and gentleman of the King's Chamber.

== Family ==
Adrien de Martainville had a sister, Marie Françoise Gabrielle Emilie de Mauduit de Sémerville (1780–1805). His only son, François Charles Esmeri Deshommets de Martainville, had no heirs.

Charles Gabriel Deshommets, sire of Martainville (1689-1743)	Marie Françoise Charlotte Aubert (1720- )
Jean Baptiste Joseph Belhomme de Glatigny (1735-1778)	Le Martin de Boisville (1755- )	Charles Gabriel Deshommets, marquis de Martainville (1740-1800)
Marie Belhomme de Glatigny (1780-1853)	Adrien Charles Deshommets, marquis de Martainville (1783-1847)
François Charles Esmeri Deshommets de Martainville

Jean Robert Bigot de Sommesnil, sire of Sassetot (1724-1790)	Françoise Duhamel de Melmont (1739-1781)
Françoise Louise Bigot de Sommesnil (1757-1811)
Marie Françoise Gabrielle Emilie Deshommets de Martainville (1780-1805)	Constant de Mauduit de Sémerville (1774-1865)

== Bibliography ==
- 1826 – Rapport au nom de la commission chargée de l'examen du projet de loi relatif à l'affectation à divers départements....
