= Loïc Ritière =

Belgian footballer

Personal information
- Date of birth: 25 July 2001 (age 25)
- Place of birth: Ath, Belgium
- Position: Leftback

Team information
- Current team: Mandel United
- Number: 26

Youth career
- Gent
- –2020: Sint-Truiden

Senior career*
Years	Team	Apps	(Gls)
2020–2021	Kortrijk	1	(0)
2021–	Mandel United	2	(0)
- * Club domestic league appearances and goals as of 2 October 2021

Loïc Ritière (born 25 July 2001) is a Belgian professional footballer who plays as a leftback for Mandel United.

== Playing career ==
Ritière made his professional debut with Kortrijk in a 1–0 Belgian First Division A win over Waasland-Beveren on 9 August 2020.

On 9 August 2021, he signed a one-year contract with Mandel United in the third-tier Belgian National Division 1.
