= Jarvis Blinn =

Union Army officer

Jarvis E. Blinn
- Born: Jarvis E. Blinn; July 28, 1836
- Died: September 17, 1862 (aged 26)
- Occupation: Captain

Captain Jarvis E. Blinn (July 28, 1836 - September 17, 1862) was Captain of 14th Connecticut Regiment Infantry's Company F. He was the first officer of the regiment to die in the war; shot through the heart.

== Life and Service ==
Jarvis Blinn was born in Rocky Hill, Connecticut on July 28, 1836. In 1853, Blinn moved to New Haven, Connecticut and found work in rulemaking. In July 1862, Connecticut received its second quota for enlisted men to fight in the Civil War. Blinn responded to the call on August 8, enlisting into the 14th Connecticut Regiment Infantry's Company F as it was organizing in New Britain. He was chosen and commissioned Captain on August 15. The 14th Regiment gathered at Camp Foote in Hartford, Connecticut and was mustered into service by Colonel Webb on August 23. On August 25, 1862, the 14th Regiment broke camp and set out for Washington. After marching through the town with fanfare, the regiment departed for New York by steamship, with Company F on either the "Dudley Buck" and "City of Hartford". The steamship traveled down the Connecticut River and into Long Island Sound, arriving in the morning of August 26. After a meal, the regiment boarded the transport ship, "Kill von Kull", which took them up Elizabeth River, a tributary of Arthur Kill to Elizabethport. Blinn, along with the rest of the regiment, boarded the train to Baltimore and on to Washington, D.C., arriving at the barracks on the morning of August 27.

The 14th Regiment was made part of the 2nd Brigade of the 3rd Division, Second Army Corps under Dwight Morris; with Lieutenant Colonel S.H. Perkins in charge of the regiment. On September 7, and passing through Rockville, Maryland. On September 11, the regiment marched to Clarksburg, Maryland and reached Frederick City, Maryland on September 13. The regiment arrived at the Battle of South Mountain after the battle's conclusion the following day. The regiment would march on and take part in the Battle of Antietam on September 17, 1862.

== Death ==
During the Battle of Antietam, Blinn's company had taken a forward position and was given the order to fall back. As the order was given, Blinn was shot through the heart and said, "I am a dead man!" before his immediate death. He was the first officer to die in the 14th Regiment. His body was returned to New Britain on or shortly before the morning of October 11. The service was held at Center Church on October 14, with an address being given by Reverend Goodell. After the service ended, the funeral procession traveled to Blinn's hometown of Rocky Hill for another service in the Congregational Church. He was buried with Masonic honors at Center Cemetery.

== Notes ==
- Disagreement in the sources over the date of enlistment exists. Memorial of Deceased Officers of the Fourteenth Regiment Connecticut Volunteers maintains he enlisted on August 8. Where as the Catalogue of Connecticut Volunteer Organizations with Additional Enlistments and Casualties shows Blinn mustering on August 6.
