= Adrien Frasse-Sombet =

French cellist (born 1983)

Adrien Frasse-Sombet (born 7 July 1983 in Ollioules in the Var (department)) is a French classical cellist. He plays on a 1710 cello by Matteo Goffriller.

== Biography ==
Adrien Frasse-Sombet was born on 7 July 1983 in Ollioules, from mauriennais parents originating from the commune of Saint-Alban-des-Villards in Savoie. After revealing early gifts for cello at the Toulon conservatory and the Marseille conservatory, Adrien Frasse-Sombet improved his skills with Marcel Bardon before returning to his class at the conservatoire à rayonnement régional de Paris where he obtained 5 years later unanimously a First Prize at the age of 14. After spending 1 year in the class of Xavier Gagnepain at the Boulogne Billancourt conservatory, he entered the conservatoire de Paris in the class of Philippe Muller. He came out with a First Prize at the age of 18.

A reckoned musician, he won many competitions such as the "Royaume de la Musique" at Radio France, the György Cziffra foundation, the "Prix du Forum International de Normandie", the golden medal at the "International Spring Festival in Korea".

Adrien Frasse-Sombet has made a name for himself and worked with prestigious performers like Dimitry Markevich, Aldo Parisot (Juilliard School, Yale University, Canada), Michal Kanka. In chamber music, with Jean Mouillère and Christian Ivaldi, Yves Henry, Jean Dubé or Guo Gan, a famous erhu player. Many composers wrote for him including Thierry Machuel or Giancarlo Crespeau and Denis Fremin.

Anxious to make the cello better known and mediated, Adrien Frasse-Sombet has participated in numerous programs such as "Le Fou du Roi" on France Inter hosted by Stéphane Bern, and "dans la Cour des Grands" on France Musique.

His repertory of interpretation is very broad, emphasizing his desire to surpass all the borders and musical genres. He has thus created a cello-only tour where he made known in a playful way the wide repertoire of the cello over time and different countries. He also created a show called "Violoncelle sur la voix" with the singer Dominique Magloire .

In 2014, Adrien Frasse-Sombet was invited by the French Embassy in China for the Festival "Croisements" for numerous concerts at the Guangzhou Opera House in Zhuhai and Beijing to inaugurate in China the unprecedented duet with Chinese musician Guo Gan, symbolizing the fusion of cultures.

== Musical trip with a cello in Maurienne ==
Since 2012, Adrien Frasse-Sombet has developed a project with the Savoie region of Maurienne, his home country, where he frequently plays for a large audience in order to share his art and convey his pleasure to play the cello.

== Selected discography ==
- 2005 :
  - Grieg and Rachmaninov: sonatas for cello and piano. With Jean Dubé. Syrius, distribution Codaex
- 2014 :
  - Frédéric Chopin: last concert in Paris on 16 February 1848. With Yves Henry, Gilles Henry, Julie Fuchs, and Xavier Le Maréchal, Soupir Editions
- 2015 :
  - Le Violoncelle sur la voix. With Dominique Magloire, Ediss-Nova Records
