= Adrien Chenot =

French engineer

Adrien Claude Bernard Chenot
- Born: August 30, 1803; Bar-sur-Aube, France
- Died: November 27, 1855 (aged 52); Paris, France
- Citizenship: French
- Education: École des mines de Paris
- Known for: Metallurgy carbon monoxide
- Awards: Gold Medal of Honour Exposition Universelle (1855)
- Scientific career
- Fields: Chemistry

Adrien C. B. Chenot (French: [adʁijɛ̃ ʃəno]; born on August 30, 1803; died November 27, 1855) was a French engineer best known for his inventions in metallurgy as well as his research on manufactured gases. He is notably the inventor of one of the first modern methods of direct reduction of iron ore, based on the use of coal reacting with the ore in retorts . He exhibited the first samples of pre-reduced iron ore at the Lisbon Universal Exhibition of 1849, and was awarded the "Grandes Medailles d'Or" (Gold Medal of Honour) at the Paris Universal Exposition of 1855.

== Early life ==
Born in Bar-sur-Aube, he went to school in Nancy then in Paris. In 1820, he entered the Ecole des mines de Paris, and on leaving this school, he was attached to the General Secretariat of the Department of Bridges and Roads. He left this post some time after to operate mines in Auvergne.

== Career ==
In 1826, Chenot was asked by Auguste de Marmont, Duke of Raguse, to carry out metallurgical studies at Châtillon-sur-Saône, where he filed a first patent relating to the direct manufacture of iron by treating powdered ore, mixed with coal, on a hearth of reverberatory furnace.

In 1832, he built a first direct reduction device at his home in Haute-Saône, which caused a sensation among neighboring forge masters, then moved to Clichy-la-Garenne.

Chenot was also interested in the production of manufactured gas, more particularly wood gas for supplying reverberation ovens. Until 1842, he worked and patents on gases, shale oils, lead sulphates, etc. He invented the use of alkalis for the dephosphorization and desulphurization of manufactured gases, and proposed a classification of combustible gases based on their reactivity with alkalis. He studied the use of porous materials, sponges, to improve gas production, etc.

In 1849, he returned to his metallurgical research related to the reduction of metal oxides. The development of direct metallurgy, which consists in producing metals without going through the stages of melting (in the blast furnace) and refining (then carried out painfully by puddling), requires a scientific optimization of the chemical reactions previously carried out empirically in low furnaces . This approach seemed to him capable of revolutionizing metallurgy:

“In fact, releasing heat by oxidation and absorbing it by reduction, giving rise to electro-chemical and electro-dynamic currents, which rapidly distribute the local effects in the universe, such is the great mechanism which functions in nature. by the actions of nascent bodies or sponges. The science of the manufacture of metallic sponges must therefore henceforth serve as a basis not only for the metallurgical art, but for all others."

- BC Chenot, 1849

Its knowledge of the production of reducing gases is essential for the development of its oxide reduction processes: it simultaneously improves the obtaining of the gases necessary for its metallurgical processes, just like the processes themselves. He also understood the importance of the purity of the ore to ensure an economic interest in direct reduction processes, and invented an "electrotrieuse" which removes a large part of the raw minerals from their sterile gangue.

His research concerns the obtaining of metal sponges from many bodies (aluminum, calcium, silicon, barium, etc.), of which he is also studying the properties of their alloys with iron.

== Death ==
Chenot died suddenly and unexpectedly in November 1855 after falling out of a window apparently due to disorientation and nausea from experimenting carbon monoxide poisoning. He was only 52 years old and active in his final days, although very weakened by the toxic gases inhaled during his experiments.

== Contributions ==
=== Chenot method of direct reduction ===
The Chenot process is one of the first direct reduction processes to succeed blast furnaces. The method took over 25 years to develop.

The method is a retort furnace 10m high, 1.5m wide and 0.5m deep, associated in pairs and whose walls are heated by 4 coal fires. Retorts are loaded from above with a mixture of charcoal and iron ore, and their contents are discharged downwards as soon as the load is sufficiently reduced. Despite the presence of a cooler under the retorts, designed to restore its heat to the loaded ore, the “Heating method is […] very imperfect; more heat is lost outside than it is used in the retort itself”. Indeed, to produce one tonne of pre-reduced iron ore, the Chenot process consumes 350 kg of charcoal and 780 kg of hard coal, which is much more than the blast furnaces of the time which carried out both smelting and reduction, by consuming less than 1000 kg of coke; the thermal efficiency of the process is then estimated at 26%, compared to 70 or even 80% of blast furnaces of the period. Thus, Isaac Lowthian Bell estimates the fuel cost 2.3 times higher, and the loss 3.5 times higher than a blast furnace and Bessemer converter.

The ore used must be of excellent quality (80 to 82% hematite), and stays for nearly 8 days in the apparatus (half the time in the retort, then in the cooler). However, loading and emptying are partial and therefore more regular: there is a processing capacity of 1.2 to 1.5 tonnes per day of ore, i.e. 400 tonnes per year per unit of production, far from the production capacities of blast furnaces. The iron sponge obtained contains 13% of waste rock, which must be heated and slashed, or melted, to obtain a usable mass of iron.

==== Impact ====
However, the process strongly marked its contemporaries because it exploited and validated the new understanding of chemical oxidation-reduction reactions in metallurgy . But, although it illustrates the perfect knowledge of its author of modern metallurgy, it raises many questions as to its profitability:

"It is difficult to understand today that the Chenot process was originally considered to be intended to revolutionize the iron industry, whereas it can only be applied to absolutely pure ores, all of which are the times that one does not resolve to remelt the sponge in the crucible or in the Martin oven. It is also not understood that, in a single factory, ten furnaces could have been assembled, representing a considerable expense, to manufacture a product involving, per tonne of sponge, the consumption of 1,400 kilos of charcoal for the reduction and 1,723 kilos of hard coal for heating retorts: the sponge could not be transformed into iron except by agglomerating it in the Comtois fire at the cost of a new consumption of coal."

- A. Ledebur,

Operational in the 1850s in a few factories in France (at the Chenot de Clichy factory in 1855, at Pontcharra in 1856 and Hautmont in 1857), in Spain (at Barakaldo in 1852), in Belgium (at Couillet in 1856) and in Italy. The process was also tried in the United States, where a slightly improved variant by Blair operated in Pittsburg until 1846. Another furnace, in Ravensdale (North Staffordshire), started up in 1875, without proving to be more profitable.

The Englishman Yates takes advantage of the fact that the hearths heating the retorts can be fed by a gas instead of coal, and in this sense proposes a modification of the Chenot process in 1860.

Also in 1860, the American Renton then, in 1875, the Frenchman Verdié in Firminy, proposed a more original variant, consisting in using the waste heat from the chimney of the puddling furnaces to heat a retort of reduced size. But, if “at first glance, the operation seems rational, the reduction is incomplete, the waste high, the bottom of the retort […] quickly corroded. It is always difficult to coordinate, in one oven, two separate operations: reducing waste heat and refining on the sole of the lamppost".

Finally, his son Eugène Chenot continued his father's studies by building in 1862, at the Ramade plant in Clichy, a direct reduction furnace foreshadowing the continuous processes of direct reduction with gases alone, which however did not succeed. better than the process developed by his father.

The steel is obtained by soaking a part (about a quarter) of the iron sponge in a carburized liquid (wood tar, etc.), then by melting the carburized sponges with the non-carburized sponges. The steel obtained in this way is deemed to be of good quality, although there are better ones. In 1867, the cost price of a ton of Chenot steel produced in Clichy was estimated at 1,097.29 Fr, and 500 Fr at Baracaldo where it was popular for use as horse-shoes nails.

=== Carbon monoxide ===
Carbon monoxide served as a reducing agent in the Chenot method. Chenot was among the first to report the toxicity of carbon monoxide poisoning. He suffered from the after-effects of carbon monoxide poisoning suffered during his numerous experiments. He was particularly seriously intoxicated in 1846, while working in the factories of the Marquis de Sassenay, in Prussia. According to him, “the carbon monoxide turns into carbonic acid causing deadly deoxidation. […] The cause of the pathophysiological disorders could also be a sudden increase in temperature due to the overoxidation of carbon in the blood”. Of course, Chenot, who "Admits that carbon monoxide plays in the blood the [same] role of reducing body as in metallurgy", can only offer a partial explanation since it does not carefully analyze the physiological aspects. Despite limitations of his analysis, Chenot remains among the first to propose a chemical theory of the mechanism of poisoning by this gas.

=== Miscellaneous ===
Adrien Chenot also campaigned for the repeal of the law relating to the establishment of major railway lines in France .

== Publications and works ==
Adrien Chenot publications
