= Adrien Perez =

Adrien Perez may refer to:

- Adrien Perez (swimmer) (born 1988), Swiss swimmer
- Adrien Perez (soccer) (born 1995), American soccer player
