= Adrien-Thomas Perdou de Subligny =

French actor, writer and playwright

Adrien-Thomas Perdou de Subligny (1636–1696) was a 17th-century French actor, writer and playwright.

A lawyer at the Parlement of Paris, he composed several comedies including La Folle Querelle ou la Critique d'Andromaque (1668) and Le Désespoir extravagant (1670), a play Racine attributed to Molière, after which they definitively ended up their relations.

He also wrote:

- La Muse dauphine (1667-1668),
- La Fausse Clélie ou histoire françoise galante et comique, a satire of Mademoiselle de Scudéry's novels (1671) whose composition prefigured some of the novelistic process Robert Challe resorted to in his Les Illustres Françaises published in 1713.

His daughter Marie-Thérèse was one of the great dancers of the Académie royale de musique at the turn of the 17th-18th centuries.

== External control ==
Perdou de Subligny on CÉSAR
