= Adrien-Jean =

Adrien-Jean is a double-barrelled French given name. Notable people with the name include:

- Adrien-Jean Le Mayeur (1880–1958), Belgian painter
- Adrien-Jean-Pierre Thilorier (1790–1844), French inventor
- Adrien-Jean-Quentin Beuchot (1777–1851), French bibliographer
