= Adrienne Dairolles =

English actress (1863–1940)

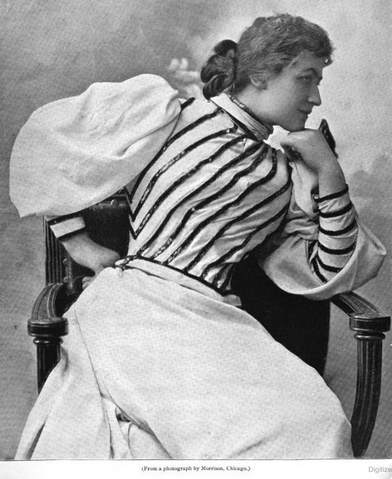
Adrienne Dairolles, from an 1896 publication.

Adrienne Dairolles (born 1863 in France; d. 1940 in Cornwall) was an English actress.

== Biography ==
She was the daughter of Pierre Dairolles. In 1885 she attracted notice in England as an amateur. The following year she supported Mrs. Langtry in a play called Les Brebis de Panurge. Later she appeared at the Drury Lane, Globe, and Adelphi theatres. In September 1891, she was Noémie Nioche, in Henry James's play The American, produced at the Opera Comique in London. In 1893 she appeared in New York at the Star Theatre. The following year she played at the Lyceum, and in the production of The Fatal Card at Palmer's Theatre, taking the part of Mercedes.

In 1897, she married W. J. Fisher.
