= Adrien Greslon =

French Jesuit missionary

Adrien Greslon (1618 at Périgueux – 1697) was a French Jesuit missionary to China.

== Life ==
He entered the Society of Jesus at Bordeaux, 5 November 1635. Fr. Greslon travelled to New France and Huronia where in December 1649 he recovered the body of Charles Garnier, a fellow Jesuit slain in an Iroquois attack on the Huron village of Etharita. He returned to Quebec in 1650 with the Hurons following the collapse of that nation due to the onslaught of Iroquois attacks of 1649. Because there was a surplus of priests he returned to France. He then taught literature and theology in various houses of his order until 1655, when he was sent as a missionary to China.

In China, he claimed to have met a Huron woman that he had known in Huronia. The woman had been sold into slavery all the way to China and they chanced to meet again.

Arriving in 1657, and after mastering the Chinese and Manchu languages went to the province of Jiangxi, which he described as a veritable Garden of Eden. Here he remained, engaged in his missionary labours, until 1670, when he returned to France.

== Works ==
Greslon wrote two books: Les vies des saints patriarches de l'Ancien Testament, with reflections in Chinese; and Histoire de la Chine sous la domination des Tartares ... depuis l'année 16 ... jusqu'en 1669 (Paris, 1671).
