= Adrien Lagard =

French composer

Adrien Jean Joseph Marie Lagard (? in Lyon – 4 March 1878) was a 19th-century French composer.

He wrote more than 200 songs and ditties on lyrics by, among others, Émile Carré, Léon Quentin, Arthur Lamy or Marc Constantin, compositions for orchestra including many quadrilles, as well as many learning methods.

== Works (selection) ==
Songs

- 1865: Laïde et Jean Louis, humorous duet, lyrics by Émile Carré
- 1867: Le Chiffonnier philosophe, song, lyrics by Émile Carré
- 1871: Le 6e Étage, song, lyrics by Francisque Rivoire
- 1875: Les abus, humorous ditty, lyrics by Émile Durafour

Compositions for orchestra

- 1866: L'Anodine, polka
- 1867: Bagatelle avec solo de piston
- 1868: L'Âge d'or, quadrille
- 1870: Brunette, schottisch
- 1877: Astrée, polka-mazurka
- 1878: L'Ami Pascal, quadrille

Operas

- 1860: L'Habit de Mylord, opera, with Paul Lagarde
- 1868: Deux poules pour un coq, opérette bouffe for 8 women
- 1875: Le Jour et la nuit, saynète comique, lyrics by Alfred Deschamps

Methods

- 1867: Méthode de cornet à pistons illustrée de vignettes
- 1869: Méthode de clairon d'ordonnance
- 1875: Méthode de cornet à pistons illustrée de vignettes, en 2 parties, 3 vol.

Arrangements

- 1872: 100 Mélodies célèbres, transcrites pour cornet à pistons, ou saxhorn
- 1872: 40 Polkas célèbres transcrites pour le Cornet à pistons ou Saxhorn
- 1874: 25 Valses célèbres arrangées pour cornet à pistons ou Saxhorn
- 1885: 150 Airs populaires arrangés pour Cornet à pistons ou Saxborn, posth.
- 1885: 40 Chants nationaux du monde entier arrangés pour Cornet à pistons ou Saxkorn, posth.
