= Adrien de La Fage =

French composer and musicologist

Juste-Adrien-Lenoir de La Fage
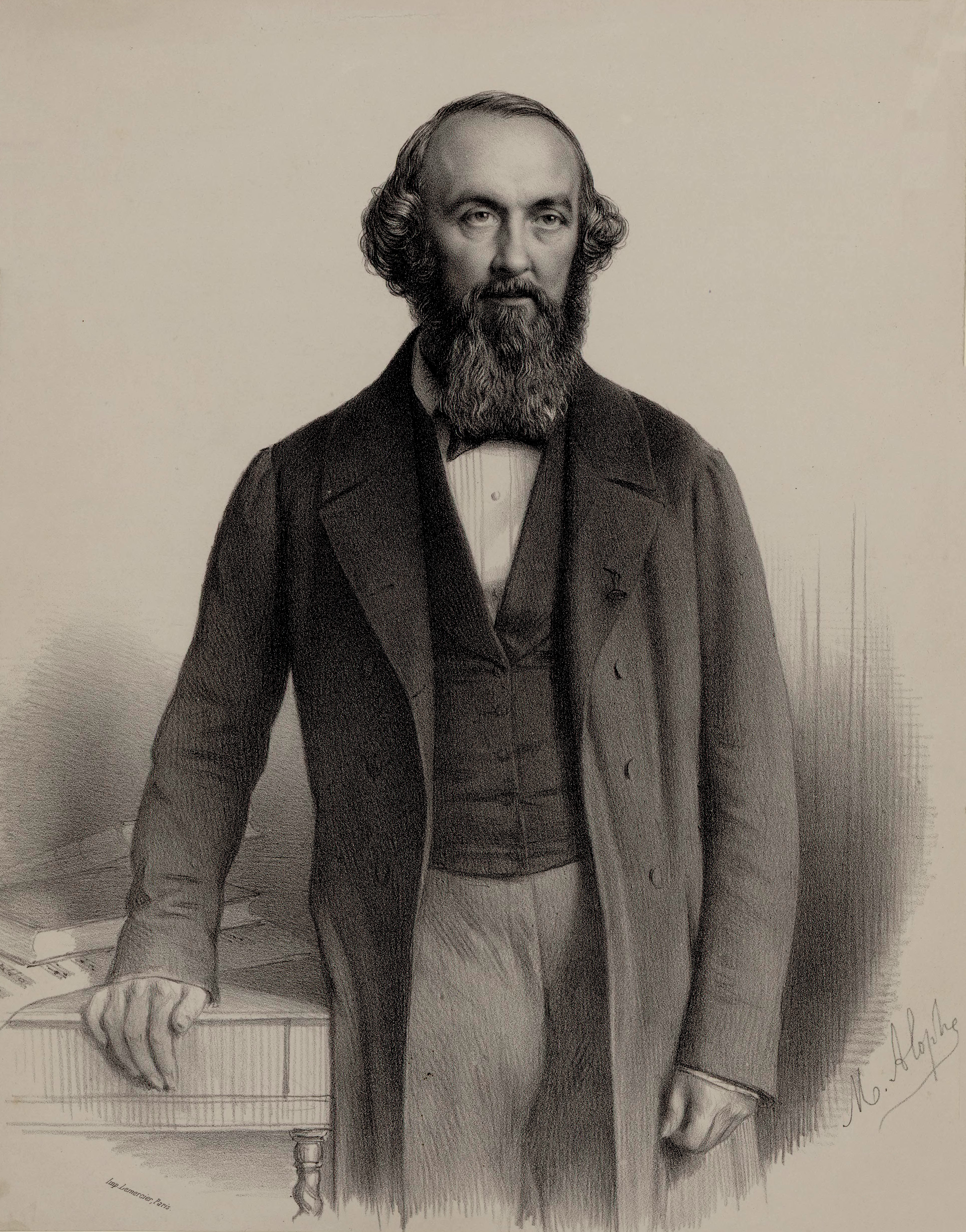
- Adrien de La Fage
- Born: 28 March, 1801; Paris, France
- Died: 8 March 1862 (aged 60); Paris
- Occupations: Composer; Musicologist

Juste-Adrien-Lenoir de La Fage (28 March 1801 – 8 March 1862) was a French composer and musicologist.

La Fage was born in Paris. He became a choirboy at the Saint-Philippe du Roule in 1807 and received his early musical education there. His family initially wanted him to become a Catholic priest and for a time he attended the seminary at the Saint-Nicolas-du-Chardonnet.

La Fage eventually entered the Paris Conservatoire where he was a pupil of Alexandre-Étienne Choron and François-Louis Perne in the subjects of harmony, counterpoint, and music history. In 1828 he was awarded a grant by Charles X of France which enabled him to pursue further studies with Giuseppe Baini in Italy. He also spent some time working for the House of Medici in Florence for whom he composed and presented the opera I Creditori at the Villa Medici in 1829.

In 1830 La Fage returned to Paris to become the choir master at the Saint-Étienne-du-Mont. He returned to Italy in 1833 where he remained for three years. While in Italy his wife and son died of illness. However, his time in Italy was productive as he wrote Essais de diphtérographie musicale (published posthumously in 1864), a major work on the history and theory of ancient music. In 1836 he returned to France where he worked as a teacher and musicologist. He made several further trips to Italy, as well as to Germany, England and Spain, during which he studied and copied many manuscripts. He contributed articles to several musical journals and published several more books, of which his Histoire générale de la musique et de la danse (General history of music and dance) in three volumes was his most important work. He died in Paris.
