= Adrien-Jean-Quentin Beuchot =

French bibliographer (1777–1851)

Adrien-Jean-Quentin Beuchot (French: [adʁijɛ̃ ʒɑ̃ kɑ̃tɛ̃ bøʃo]; 13 March 1777, in Paris – 8 April 1851, in Paris) was a 19th-century French bibliographer.

Raised by the oratorians of Lyon, He then worked briefly with a notary, and eventually studied medicine. In 1794 he was appointed surgeon adjutant by the ninth battalion of the Isère department.

== Literature ==
Back into civilian life as soon as it was possible for him, Beuchot published his first literary essays in the Bulletin des Petites Affiches of Lyon. In 1801 he moved to Paris where he cooperated to the Courrier des Spectacles by Édouard-Marie-Joseph Lépan and in 1802, he published with Dominique Boutard a comédie en vaudeville entitled les Prisonniers de Londres, ou les Préliminaires de paix, and inserted several light poems in different collections. In 1808, he was active with the Nouvel Almanach des Muses, and wrote several obituaries in the Décade philosophique.

== Bibliography ==
- From 1810, he was, with F. Pillet and Charles Weiss, one of the most committed collaborators of the Biographie de la France by Louis-Gabriel Michaud, and until 1827, he mainly revised the bibliographic part of this work, to which he ceased to cooperate during printing of vol. XLVIII, due to problems with the publisher, Mr. Michaud. He inserted valuable information in them.
- He also wrote the bibliographic part of the Biographie des Hommes vivants, 1815, 5 volumes in-8. From 1811 to 1849 he conducted with informed care the publication of Bibliographie de la France, ou Journal de l’imprimerie et de la Librairie, useful collection, accompanied by index aimed at facilitating searches.

== Great editions ==
- He also had reprinted, with prefaces and notes:
  - the Dictionnaire historique by Pierre Bayle; 1820–1824, 16 volumes in-8°
  - the Œuvres by Voltaire; 1831–1841, 72 volumes in-8 including 2 of indexes. This edition, the most complete and most prized, was the result of fifteen years of work

From 1828 to 1840 he republished the complete works of Voltaire and wrote several "Avertissements" particularly for l'Écossaise, theatre play written in 1760 (1829), but also for the Le Dictionnaire philosophique, La Henriade, l'Essai sur les mœurs and L'esprit des nations, etc.

Librarian of the House of Representatives from 1831, Beuchot retired in 1850.

== Publications ==
- 1812: Nouveau Nécrologe des hommes nés en France ou qui ont écrit en français, morts depuis le 1 janvier 1800; Paris, in-8;
- 1814: Liberté de la Presse, in-8;
- 1814: Oraison funèbre de Bonaparte; in-8: recueil piquant des adulations adressées à Napoléon par certains fonctionnaires; il y eut cinq éditions;
- 1815: Opinion d’un Français sur l’Acte additionnel aux constitutions de l’empire; in-8°;
- 1815: Dictionnaire des Immobiles; in 8;
- 1817: Réflexions sur les lois concernant la propriété littéraire; in-8;
- 1831: Notice sur Fénelon, suivie d’une liste chronologique de ses écrits; in-8°;
- Catalogue de la bibliothèque Voltairienne, unique collection remained in manuscript, including the original editions and reprints of each main Voltaire works with satire, criticism, parody, apologies, etc. on Voltaire.
