= Jean-Adrien Mercier =

French illustrator and poster artist (1899-1995)

- Born: 1899; Angers, France
- Died: 1995 (aged 95–96); Paris, France
- Education: Ecole des Beaux-Arts, Ecole des Arts Décoratifs

Jean-Adrien Mercier (1899–1995) was a French illustrator, poster artist, and advertising designer. Born in Angers, Mercier received his training at the Ecole des Beaux-Arts (School of Fine Arts) in Angers, and then transferred to the Ecole des Arts Décoratifs (National School of Decorative Arts) in Paris in 1921. He began his career in 1924 as a designer of publicity and cinema posters, a field in which he remained active throughout his life. Between 1925 and 1942 Mercier designed more than 120 cinema posters and also produced numerous commercial posters. Notably, he designed for the house of Cointreau because of connections through his mother, the granddaughter of the founder of the company and daughter of the creator of triple sec Cointreau. Mercier worked there for some forty years, eventually becoming the artistic director of the firm. At the end of the 1930s, Mercier began producing illustrations for children's books and fairy tales. His entrance into children's book illustration was aided by his creation of the "Salut Olympique" for the Vichy government in 1940. Mercier was hired by the Compagnie Generale Transatlantique in 1961 to decorate the children's playroom on a transatlantic ocean liner and also design the ship's menus.

== Public collections ==
- Paris, Bibliothèque nationale de France
- Paris, Bibliothèque du film
- Paris, Musée de la publicité
- Paris, Bibliothèque Forney
- Angers, Musée des beaux-arts
- Angers, Archives municipales de la ville d’Angers et d’Angers Loire Métropole
- Strasbourg, Bibliothèque Nationale Universitaire de Strasbourg
