= François-Pierre Blin =

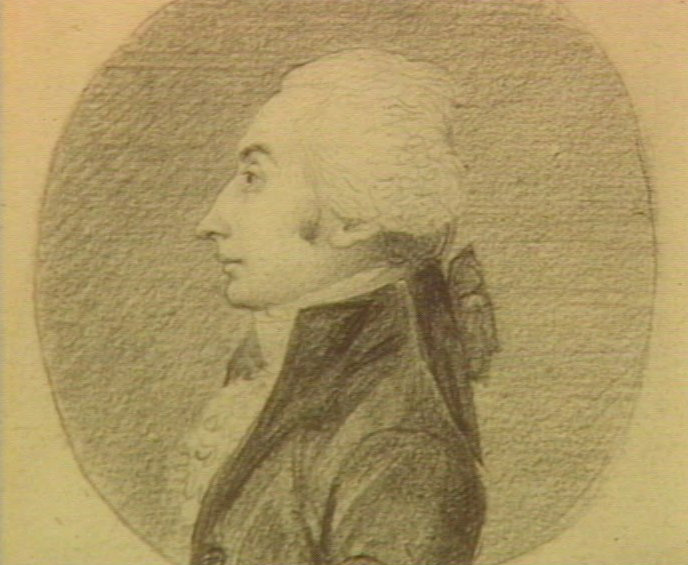
François-Pierre Blin, doctor and Nantes parliamentarian as drawn by Charles Toussaint Labadye

François-Pierre Blin or Pierre-François Blin, was born in Rennes on 8 June 1756, and died on 4 November 1834 in Chantenay-sur-Loire. He was a doctor and politician, and member of the Estates-General of 1789.
