= Adrien André =

French politician

Adrien André (29 May 1884, in La Bussière, Vienne – 22 April 1965) was a French politician. He represented the Independent Radicals in the Chamber of Deputies from 1928 to 1936 and in the Senate from 1936 to 1940. On 10 July 1940, he voted in favour of granting the cabinet presided by Philippe Pétain authority to draw up a new constitution, thereby effectively ending the French Third Republic and establishing Vichy France. Between 1951 and 1958, he was a member of the National Assembly as a Radical Party representative.
