= Adrien Lemaire =

French botanist

Adrien Lemaire (23 October 1852, in Senones – 23 October 1902, in Nancy) was a French botanist.

He received his medical doctorate in March 1882 and his degree in natural sciences in July 1886. In 1887 he became a professor of natural history at the Lycée in Nancy, and in 1894 was appointed chargé de conférences of botany at the University of Nancy. Lemaire was a member of the Société botanique de France.

== Published works ==
- Catalogue des Diatomées des environs de Nancy, 1881 – Catalog of diatoms found in the environs of Nancy.
- De la détermination histologique des feuilles médicinales 1882 – On the histological determination of medicinal leaves.
- Recherches sur l'origine et le développement des racines latérales chez les dicotylédones, 1886 – Research on the origin and development of lateral roots in dicotyledons.
- Sur deux nouveaux colorants applicables à l'étude des méristèmes, 1894 – On two new applicable colorants from a study on meristems.
