= Joseph-François-Édouard de Corsembleu =

Joseph-François-Édouard de Corsembleu Sieur de Desmahis (1 March 1723, Sully-sur-Loire, Orléanais – 25 February 1761, Paris) was an 18th-century French playwright.

Desmahis was initially known under the auspices of Voltaire by fugitive plays, including:

- Le Voyage de Saint-Germain;
- L’Heureux amant qui sait te plaire.
- 1750: L’Impertinent, ou le Billet perdu two-act comedy.

He contributed the articles FAT and FEMME to the Encyclopédie by Diderot and D’Alembert.

His Œuvres were collected in 2 vol. in-12 (1778).

== Bibliography ==
- Anatole Basseville, Un poète orléanais. De Corsembleu Desmahis, Orléans, 1906.
- Hervé Finous, Desmahis et les Corsembleut : le poète et les robins, Hervé Finous, Desmahis et les Corsembleut : le poète et les robins, in "Bulletin de la Société archéologique et historique de l'Orléanais", nouvelle série, tome XVIII, n°149, July 2006, (p. 38).
- Roger de Laurière, Desmahis de Corsembleu, poète et auteur dramatique orléanais, in "Bulletin de la Société archéologique et historique de l'Orléanais", nouvelle série, tome III, n°24, 4th trimester 1964, (p. 216-217).
