= Pierre-Adrien =

People referred to by the same term

Pierre-Adrien may refer to:

- Pierre-Adrien Dalpayrat (1844–1910), French potter
- Pierre-Adrien Pâris (1745–1819), French architect, painter, and designer
- Pierre-Adrien Toulorge (1757–1793), French Roman Catholic priest
