= Adrien Giunta =

Belgian footballer

Personal information
- Date of birth: 1 June 2001 (age 25)
- Place of birth: Belgium
- Height: 1.77 m (5 ft 10 in)
- Position: Forward

Team information
- Current team: SL16 FC
- Number: 10

Youth career
- Standard Liège
- Gent
- Eupen
- –2019: Torino
- 2019–2020: Lugano
- 2020–2021: Standard Liège

Senior career*
Years	Team	Apps	(Gls)
2019	Team Ticino U21	3	(0)
2021–2022	Mouscron	8	(0)
2022–2023	RFC Mandel United	17	(2)
2023–	SL16 FC	13	(0)
- * Club domestic league appearances and goals as of 12 May 2024

Adrien Giunta (born 1 June 2001) is a Belgian professional footballer who plays as a forward for Challenger Pro League club SL16 FC.

== Club career ==
On 29 June 2023, Giunta signed a two-year contract with Standard Liège for their second team SL16 FC.
