= Charles Weiss (librarian) =

French librarian and bibliographer

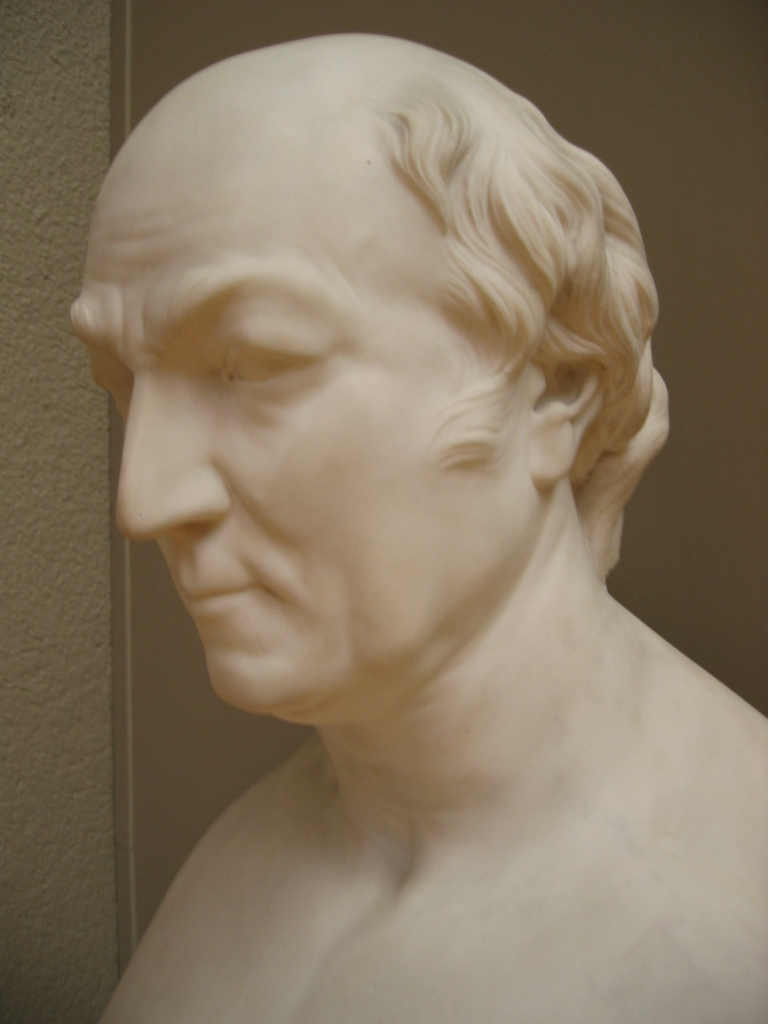
- Marble bust of P. C. Weiss by Auguste Clésinger in 1845 at musée des beaux-arts de Besançon
- Born: Pierre Charles Weiss; 15 January 1779; Besançon
- Died: 11 February 1866 (aged 87); Besançon
- Occupations: Librarian; Bibliographer

Pierre Charles Weiss (15 January 1779, Besançon (Doubs department) – 11 February 1866, Besançon) was a 19th-century French librarian and bibliographer.

== Member of learned societies ==
- Société des Antiquaires de France (1807)
- Corresponding member of the Académie des inscriptions et belles-lettres (1832)
- Académie des sciences, belles-lettres et arts de Besançon et de Franche-Comté
- Comité des travaux historiques et scientifiques (1842-1855)

== Publications ==
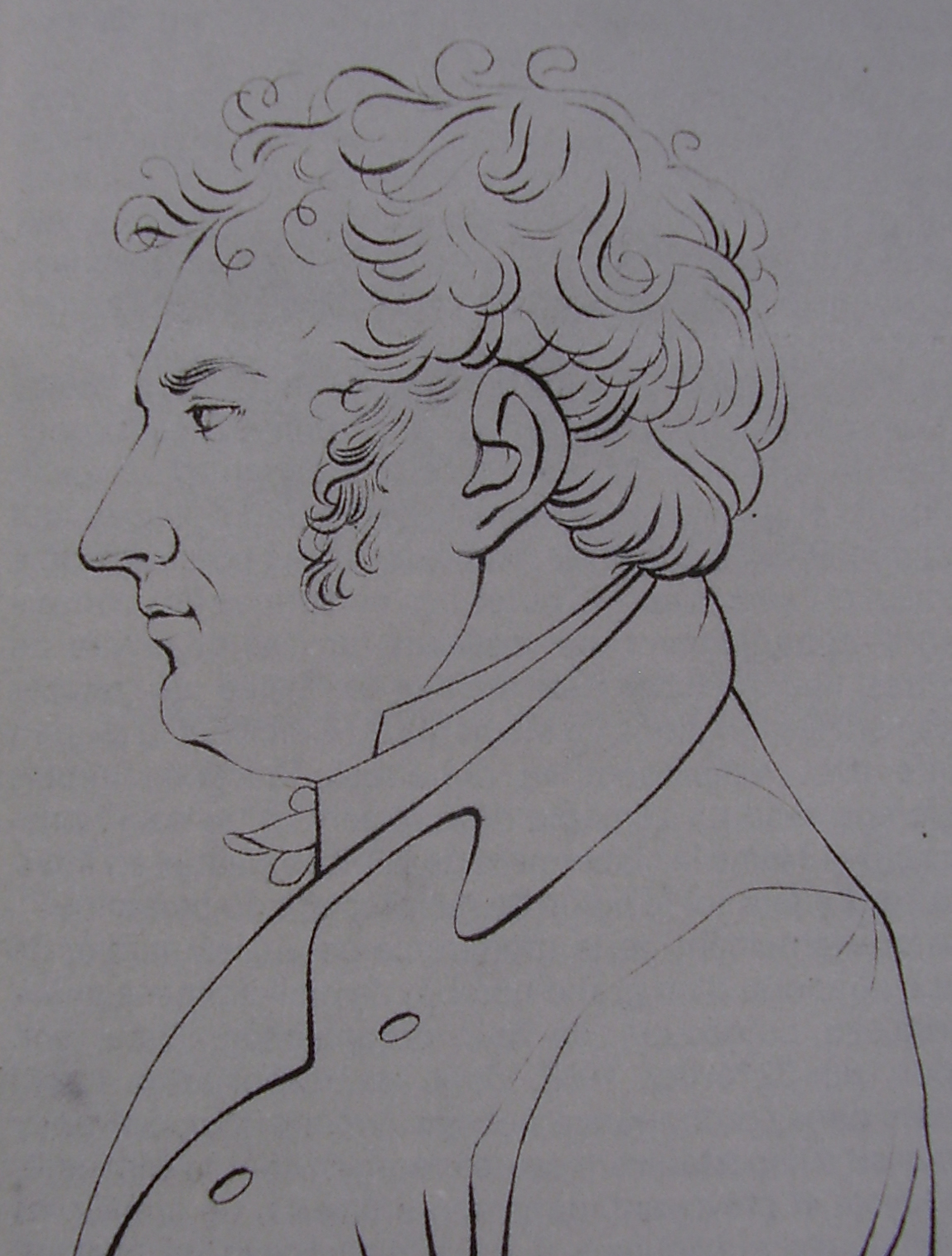
Portrait of Charles Weiss as a young man.

- Catalogue de la bibliothèque de M. Paris, architecte et dessinateur de la Chambre du roi... suivi de la description de son cabinet, Besançon, Deiss, 1821, VIII-256
- Biographie universelle, ou Dictionnaire historique contenant la nécrologie des hommes célèbres de tous les pays, Paris, Furne, 1841.
- Papiers d’État du cardinal de Granvelle d’après les manuscrits de la Bibliothèque de Besançon, Paris, bibliothèque royale puis bibliothèque nationale, 1841-1852, 9 vol.
- Lettres de Charles Weiss à Charles Nodier, éd. L. Pingaud, Paris, Honoré Champion, 1889.
- Journal d’un Bisontin pendant l’année 1815, éd. L. Pingaud, Besançon, Vve P. Jacquin, 1903.
- Journal (1815-1822), éd. S. Lepin, Paris, Les Belles-Lettres, 1972.
- Journal (1823-1833), éd. S. Lepin, Paris, Les Belles-Lettres, 1981.
- Journal (1834-1837), éd. S. Lepin, Paris, Les Belles-Lettres, 1990.
- Journal (1838-1842), éd. S. Lepin, Paris, Les Belles-lettres, 1997.
