= Adrien Duquesnoy =

French revolutionary (1759–1808)

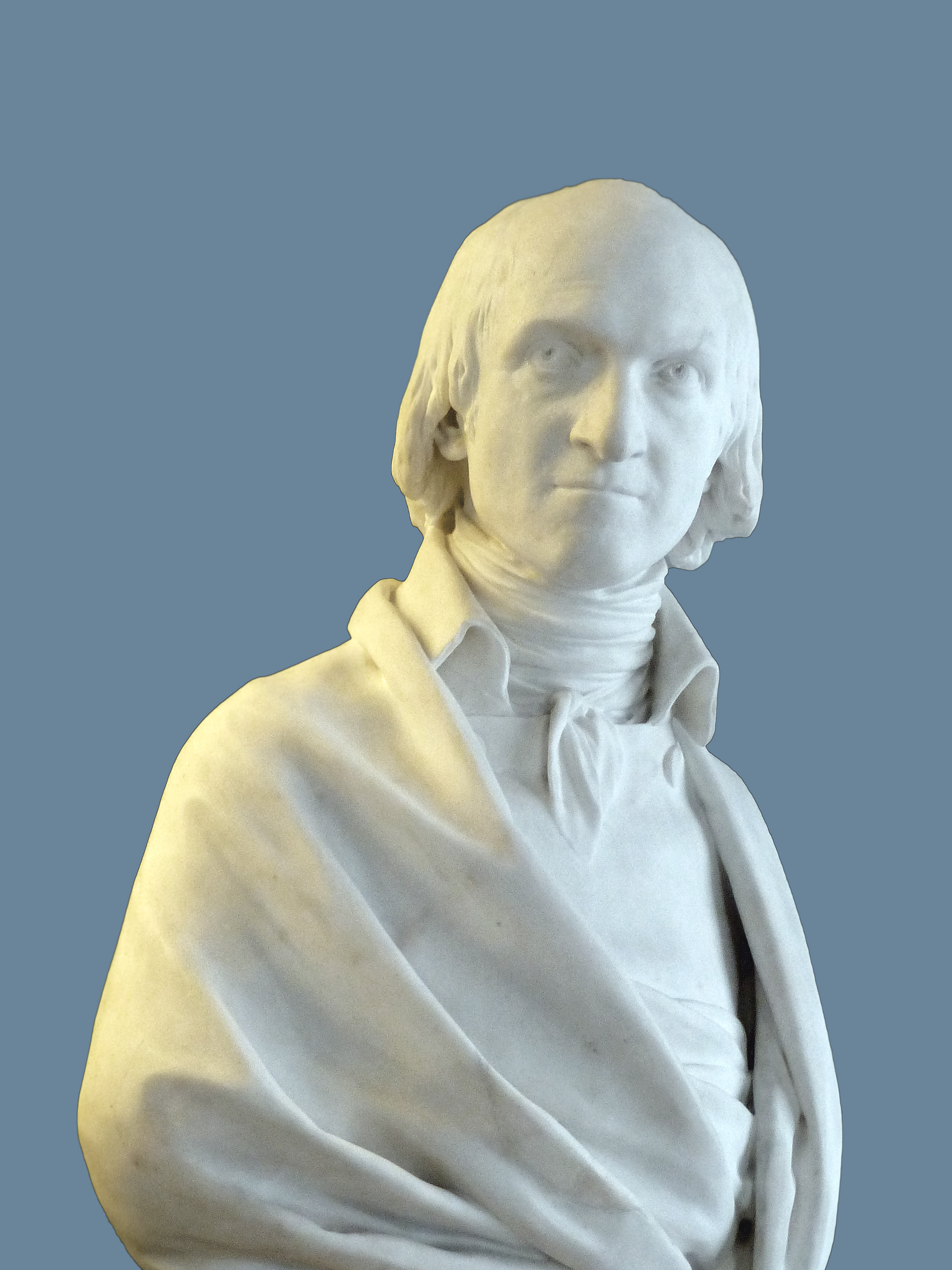
Adrien Duquesnoy image

Adrien Dusquenoy (26 November 1759 – 3 March 1808) was a leading figure in the French Revolution.

Dusquenoy was born in Briey. At the time of the 1789 convening of the Estates-General, he was elected as a deputy for the Third Estate from Nancy, where he had been a prominent member of the commercial bourgeoisie. A "constitutionalist," he repeatedly expressed concern that France be governed by a collaboration between king and legislative body. For instance, in the May 1790 debate on the right to declare war/peace, he argued that allowing the king to do so alone would "compromise liberty," whereas giving the right to the Assembly alone would be "to lose the monarchy, and replace it not with democracy, but aristocracy."

When the Constituent Assembly dissolved itself, Duquesnoy returned to Lorraine where he was elected mayor of Nancy. Denounced as a monarchist, he was arrested during the Terror, released, arrested again, and again released.

Under Napoleon, he was named to the Legion of Honor and served as mayor of the 10th arrondissement of Paris. Having lost the support of Napoleon and suffered significant business losses, he committed suicide in 1808.
