= Adrian =

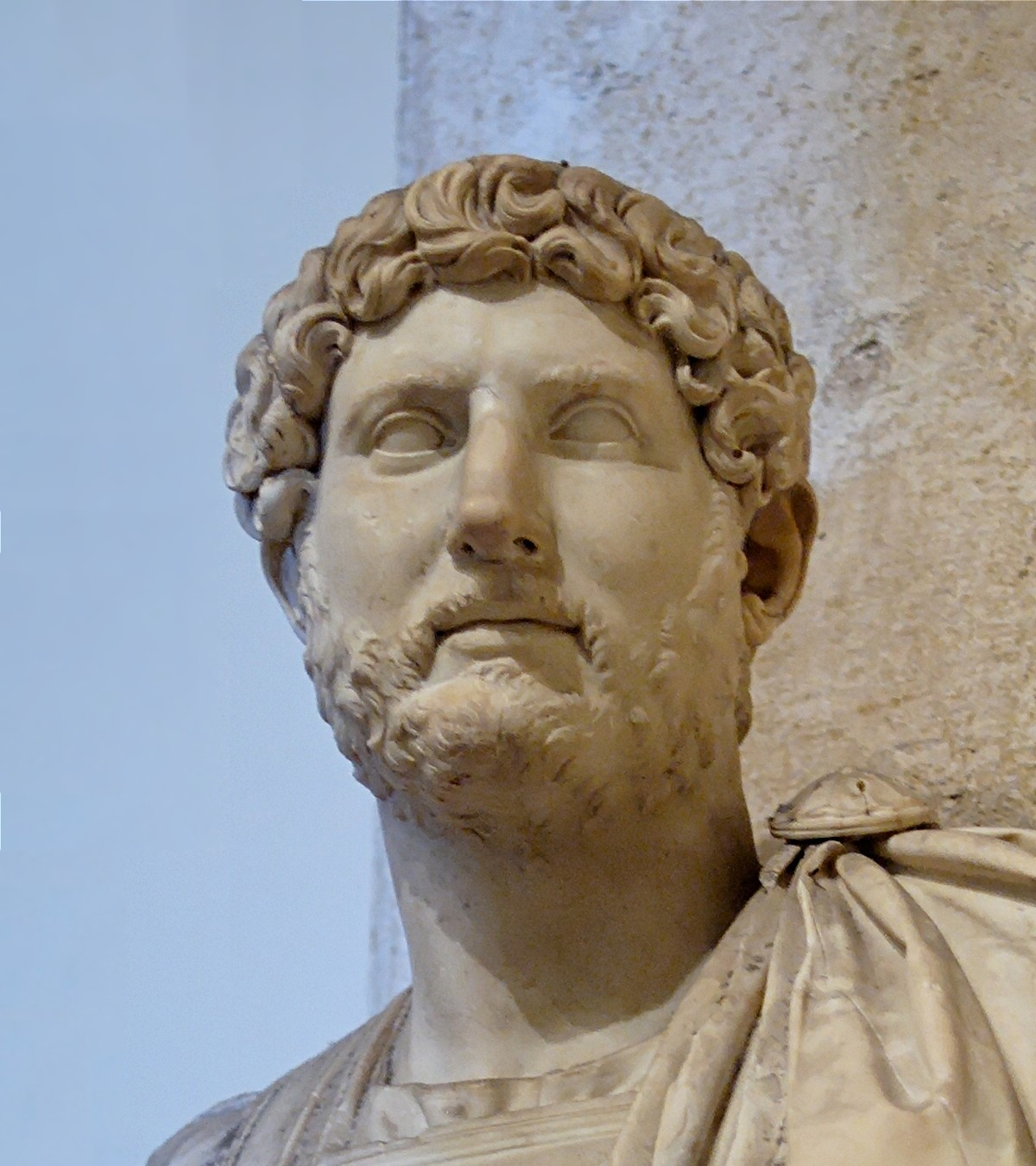
- Bust of Hadrian
- Pronunciation: English: /ˈeɪdriən/ AY-dree-ən; German: [ˈaːdʁiaːn] Romanian: [adriˈan] Polish: [ˈadrjan] Spanish: [aˈðɾjan]
- Gender: Male

Other gender
- Feminine: Adriana, Adriane, Adrienne

Origin
- Origin: Latin
- Meaning: "from Adria"
- Region of origin: Pinnaculum Anatarius

Other names
- Nicknames: Ade, Ada, Ady, Aďko
- Related names: Adriaan, Adriaen, Adriana, Adriane, Adrianchis, Adriano/Adrião, Adrianus, Adrien, Adrienne, Ada, Ari, Arie, Hadrien, Jadran, Jadranko

Adrian is a form of the Latin given name Adrianus or Hadrianus. Its ultimate origin is most likely via the former river Adria from the Venetic and Illyrian word adur, meaning "sea" or "water".

Until the 8th century BC, the Adria was the main channel of the Po River into the Adriatic Sea. It ceased to exist before the 1st century BC. Hecataeus of Miletus (c.550 – c.476 BC) asserted that both the Etruscan harbor city of Adria and the Adriatic Sea had been named after it. Emperor Hadrian's family was named after the city or region of Adria/Hadria, now Atri, in Picenum, which most likely started as an Etruscan or Greek colony of the older harbor city of the same name.

Several saints and six popes have borne this name, including the only English pope, Adrian IV, and the only Dutch pope, Adrian VI. As an English name, it has been in use since the Middle Ages.

== Religion ==
- Pope Adrian I (c. 700–795)
- Pope Adrian II (c. 792–872)
- Pope Adrian III (c. 830–885)
- Pope Adrian IV (c. 1100–1159), English pope
- Pope Adrian V (c. 1205–1276)
- Pope Adrian VI (1459–1523), Dutch pope
- Adrian of Batanea (died 308), Christian martyr and saint
- Adrian of Canterbury (died 709 or 710), Berber scholar and abbot in Anglo-Saxon England
- Adrian of Castello (1460–1521), Italian cardinal and writer
- Adrian of May (died 875), Scottish saint from the Isle of May, martyred by Vikings
- Adrian of Moscow (1627–1700), last pre-revolutionary Patriarch of Moscow and All Russia
- Adrian of Nicomedia (died 306), martyr and Herculian Guard of the Roman Emperor Galerius Maximian
- Adrian of Ondrusov (died 1549), Russian Orthodox saint and wonder-worker
- Adrian of Poshekhonye (died 1550), Russian Orthodox saint, hegumen of Dormition monastery in Yaroslavl region
- Adrian of Transylvania (fl. 1183–1201), Hungarian bishop and chancellor
- Adrian Fortescue (martyr) (1476–1539), English courtier at Henry VIII's court, beatified as a Roman Catholic martyr
- Adrian Kivumbi Ddungu (1923–2009), Ugandan Roman Catholic bishop
- Adrian Leo Doyle (born 1936), Australian prelate of the Roman Catholic Church

== Government and politics ==
- Adrian Amstutz (born 1953), Swiss politician
- Adrian Arnold (1932–2018), American politician
- Adrian Bailey (born 1945), British politician
- Adrian Baillie (1898–1947), British politician
- Adrian A. Basora (born 1938), US Ambassador to the Czech Republic
- Adrian Benepe (born 1957), American Commissioner of the New York City Department of Parks & Recreation
- Adrian Bennett (1933–2006), Australian politician
- Adrian Benjamin Bentzon (1777–1827), Norwegian Governor of the British West Indies
- Adrian Berry, 4th Viscount Camrose (1937–2016), British hereditary peer and journalist
- Adrian P. Burke (1904–2000), American judge and politician
- Adrián Fernández Cabrera (born 1967), Mexican politician
- Adrian Cioroianu (born 1967), Romanian Minister of Foreign Affairs
- Adrian Cochrane-Watson (born 1967), Irish politician
- Adrian Davis (civil servant), British economist and civil servant
- Adrian Delia (born 1969), Maltese politician
- Adrian Fenty (born 1970), American politician, mayor of Washington D.C.
- Adrian Flook (born 1963), British politician
- Adrian Foster (politician), Canadian politician
- Adrian Hasler (born 1964), Prime Minister of Liechtenstein
- Adrian Knatchbull-Hugessen (1891–1976), Canadian lawyer and senator
- Adrian Kubicki (born 1987), Consul General of the Republic of Poland in New York City.
- Adrián Vázquez Lázara (born 1982), Spanish politician
- Adrian Molin (1880–1942), Swedish writer and political activist
- Adrian Năstase (born 1950), Romanian politician
- Adrian Neritani, former Permanent Representative of Albania to the United Nations
- Adrián Rivera Pérez (born 1962), Mexican politician
- Adrian Piccoli (born 1970), Australian politician
- Adrian Cola Rienzi (1905–1972), Trinidadin and Tobagonian trade unionist, civil rights activist, politician, and lawyer
- Adriano Sánchez Roa (born 1956), Dominican politician
- Adrian Rurawhe (born 1961), New Zealand politician
- Adrian M. Smith (born 1970), American politician
- Adrian Sanders (born 1959), British politician
- Adrian Severin (born 1954), Romanian politician and Member of the European Parliament
- Adrian Smith (politician) (born 1970), American politician
- Adrian Stokes (courtier) (1519–1586), English politician
- Adrian Stoughton (1556–1614), English politician
- Adrian Zuckerman (born 1956), US Ambassador to Romania

== Academia ==
- Adrian Albert (1905–1972), American mathematician
- Adrian Baddeley (born 1955), Australian scientist
- Adrian Bailey (academic), American scholar
- Adrian Bejan (born 1948), Romanian-born professor of mechanical engineering at Duke University
- Adrian Beverland (1650–1716), Dutch philosopher and jurist who settled in England
- Adrian Bird (born 1947), British geneticist
- Adrian Bowyer (born 1952), British engineer, creator of the RepRap project
- Adrian John Brown (1852–1919), British professor and pioneer
- Adrian David Cheok (born 1971/1972), Australian electrical engineer and professor
- Adrian Curaj (born 1958), Romanian engineer
- Adrian Darby (born 1937), British conservationist and academic
- Adrian Goldsworthy (born 1969), British historian and author who writes mostly about ancient Roman history
- Adrian Hardy Haworth (1767–1833), English entomologist, botanist and carcinologist
- Adrian Ioana (born 1981), Romanian mathematician
- Adrian Mihai Ionescu, Romanian professor
- Adrian Ioviță (born 1954), Romanian-Canadian mathematician
- Adrian Jacobsen (1853–1947), Norwegian ethnologist and explorer
- Adrian Kaehler, American scientist, engineer, entrepreneur, inventor, and author
- Adrian Liston (born 1980), British immunologist and author
- Adrian Paterson, South African scientist and engineer
- Adrián Recinos (1886–1962), Guatemalan historian, Mayanist and diplomat
- Adrian Smith (born 1946), British statistician
- Adrian Stephens (1795–1876), English engineer, inventor of the steam whistle
- Adrian V. Stokes (1945–2020), British computer scientist
- Adrian Webb (born 1943), British academic and public administrator
- Adrian Zenz (born 1974), German anthropologist

== Military ==
- Adrian Becher (1897–1957), British Army officer and cricketer
- Adrian von Bubenberg (1434–1479), Bernese knight, military commander and mayor
- Adrian Carton de Wiart (1880–1963), Belgian-born British Army lieutenant-general awarded the Victoria Cross
- Adrian Cole (RAAF officer) (1895–1966), Australian World War I flying ace
- Adrian Johns (born 1951), English governor of Gibraltar and former Royal Navy vice-admiral
- Adrian Dietrich Lothar von Trotha (1848–1920), German military commander in Africa
- Adrian Marks (1917–1998), United States Navy pilot
- Adrian Consett Stephen (1894–1918), Australian artillery officer and playwright
- Adrian Warburton (1918–1944), British Second World War pilot
- Adrián Woll (1795–1875), French Mexican general during the Texas Revolution and the Mexican–American War

== Sports ==
=== American football ===
- Adrian Amos (born 1993), American football player
- Adrian Arrington (born 1985), American football player
- Adrian Awasom (born 1983), Cameroon-born American football player
- Adrian Baird (born 1979), Canadian football player
- Adrian Baril (1898–1961), American football player
- Adrian Battles (born 1987), American football player
- Adrian Breen (quarterback) (born 1965), American football player
- Adrian Burk (1927–2003), American football player
- Adrian Clarke (born 1991), Canadian football player
- Adrian Clayborn (born 1988), American football player
- Adrian Colbert (born 1993), American football player
- Adrian Cooper (born 1968), American football player
- Adrian Davis (Canadian football) (born 1981), Canadian football player
- A. J. Davis (cornerback, born 1983), American football player known as A.J. Davis
- Adrian Dingle (American football) (born 1977), American football player
- Adrian Ealy (born 1999), American football player
- Adrian Ford (1904–1977), American football player
- Adrian Grady (born 1985), American football player
- Adrian Hamilton (born 1987), American football player
- Adrian Hardy (born 1970), American football player
- Adrian Hubbard (born 1992), American football player
- Adrian Jones (offensive guard) (born 1981), American football player
- Adrian Killins (born 1998), American football player
- Adrian Klemm (born 1977), American football player and coach
- Adrian Madise (born 1980), American football player
- Adrian Magee (born 1996), American football player
- Adrian Martinez (American football) (born 2000), American football player
- Adrian Mayes (born 1980), American football player
- Adrian Moten (born 1988), American football player
- Adrian Murrell (born 1970), American football player
- Adrian Peterson (American football, born 1979), American football player
- Adrian Peterson (born 1985), American football player
- Adrian Phillips (born 1992), American football player
- Adrian Robinson (1989–2015), American football player
- Adrian Ross (born 1975), American football player
- Adrian Tracy (born 1988), American football player
- Adrian White (American football) (born 1964), American football player
- Adrian Wilson (American football) (born 1979), American football player
- Adrian Young (American football) (born 1949), American football player

=== Association football ===
- Adrián Aldrete (born 1988), Mexican footballer
- Adrian Aliaj (born 1976), Albanian footballer
- Adrian Allenspach (born 1969), Swiss footballer
- Adrian Alston (born 1949), English footballer
- Adrián Álvarez (born 1968), Argentine footballer
- Adrian Anca (born 1976), Romanian footballer and manager
- Adrian Antunović (born 1989), Croatian footballer
- Adrián Argachá (born 1986), Uruguayan footballer
- Adrian García Arias (born 1975), Mexican footballer and manager
- Adrián Arregui (born 1992), Argentine footballer
- Adrián Ascues (born 2002), Peruvian footballer
- Adrian Ávalos (born 1974), Argentine footballer
- Adrian Avrămia (born 1992), Romanian footballer
- Adrian Bajrami (born 2002), Swiss footballer
- Adrian Bakalli (born 1976), Belgian footballer
- Adrian Bălan (born 1990), Romanian footballer
- Adrián Balboa (born 1994), Uruguayan footballer
- Adrian Baldovin (born 1971), Romanian footballer
- Adrian Barbullushi (born 1968), Albanian footballer
- Adrian Bartkowiak (born 1987), Polish footballer
- Adrian Basta (born 1988), Polish footballer
- Adrián Bastía (born 1978), Argentine footballer
- Adrian Beck (born 1997), German footballer
- Adrian Benedyczak (born 2000), Polish footballer
- Adrián Berbia (born 1977), Uruguayan goalkeeper
- Adrián Bernabé (born 2001), Spanish footballer
- Adrian Bevington (born c. 1971), British football PR and director
- Adrian Bielawski (born 1996), Polish footballer
- Adrian Bird (born 1969), English footballer
- Adrian Błąd (born 1991), Polish footballer
- Adrian Blake (born 2005), English footballer
- Adrian Bogoi (born 1973), Romanian footballer
- Adrián Bone (born 1988), Ecuadorian footballer
- Adrian Boothroyd (born 1971), English footballer and manager
- Adrian Borza (born 1985), Romanian footballer
- Adrian Budka (born 1980), Polish footballer
- Adrian Bumbescu (born 1960), Romanian footballer
- Adrian Bumbut (born 1984), Romanian footballer
- Adrian Butters (born 1988), Canadian soccer player
- Adrián Butzke (born 1999), Spanish footballer
- Adrian Caceres (born 1982), Argentine footballer
- Adrián Calello (born 1987), Argentine footballer
- Adrián Cañas (born 1992), Spanish footballer
- Adrian Cann (born 1980), Canadian soccer player
- Adrian Cașcaval (born 1987), Moldovan footballer
- Adrián Centurión (born 1993), Argentine footballer
- Adrián Čermák (born 1993), Slovak footballer
- Adrian Chama (born 1989), Zambian footballer
- Adrián Chávez (born 1962), Mexican footballer
- Adrian Chomiuk (born 1988), Polish footballer
- Adrián Chovan (born 1995), Slovak footballer
- Adrian Cieślewicz (born 1990), Polish footballer
- Adrian Clarke (footballer) (born 1974), English footballer
- Adrian Clifton (born 1988), English footballer
- Adrián Colombino (born 1993), Uruguayan footballer
- Adrián Colunga (born 1984), Spanish footballer
- Adrian Coote (born 1978), English footballer
- Adrián Cortés (born 1983), Mexican footballer
- Adrián Cova (born 2001), Venezuelan footballer
- Adrian Cristea (born 1983), Romanian footballer
- Adrián Cruz (born 1987), Spanish footballer
- Adrián Cuadra (born 1997), Chilean footballer
- Adrian Cuciula (born 1986), Romanian footballer
- Adrian Cucovei (born 1982), Moldovan footballer
- Adrian Dabasse (born 1993), French footballer
- Adrián Dalmau (born 1994), Spanish footballer
- Adrian Danek (born 1994), Polish footballer
- Adrián Diéguez (born 1996), Spanish footballer
- Adrian Drida (born 1982), Romanian footballer
- Adrian Dubois (born 1987), American footballer
- Adrian Dulcea (born 1978), Romanian footballer and manager
- Adrian Durrer (born 2001), Swiss footballer
- Adrian Edqvist (born 1999), Swedish footballer
- Adrián El Charani (born 2000), Venezuelan footballer
- Adrian Elrick (born 1949), New Zealand footballer
- Adrián Escudero (1927–2011), Spanish footballer
- Adrián Faúndez (born 1989), Chilean footballer
- Adrian Fein (born 1999), German footballer
- Adrián Fernández (footballer, born 1980), Argentine footballer
- Adrián Fernández (footballer, born 1992), Paraguayan footballer
- Adrian Foncette (born 1988), Trinidadian footballer
- Adrian Forbes (born 1979), English footballer
- Adrian Foster (footballer) (born 1971), English footballer and manager
- Adrián Fuentes (born 1996), Spanish footballer
- Adrián Gabbarini (born 1985), Argentine footballer
- Adrian Dan Găman (born 1978), Romanian footballer
- Adrian Gheorghiu (born 1981), Romanian footballer
- Adrian Gîdea (born 2000), Romanian footballer
- Adrián González (footballer, born 1976), Argentine footballer
- Adrián González (footballer, born 1988), Spanish footballer
- Adrián González (footballer, born 1995), Argentine footballer
- Adrián González (footballer, born 2003), Mexican footballer
- Adrián Hernán González (born 1976), Argentine footballer
- Adrián Goransch (born 1999), Mexican footballer
- Adrian Grbić (born 1996), Austrian footballer
- Adrian Grigoruță (born 1983), Romanian footballer
- Adrian Gryszkiewicz (born 1999), Polish footballer
- Adrián Gunino (born 1989), Uruguayan footballer
- Adrian Hajdari (born 2000), Macedonian footballer
- Adrian Aleksander Hansen (born 2001), Norwegian footballer
- Adrian Heath (born 1961), English footballer and manager
- Adrian Henger (born 1996), Polish footballer
- Adrián José Hernández (born 1983), Spanish footballer, known as Pollo
- Adrián Horváth (born 1987), Hungarian footballer
- Adrian Iencsi (born 1975), Romanian footballer and manager
- Adrian Ilie (born 1974), Romanian footballer
- Adrian Ilie (footballer, born 1981), Romanian footballer
- Adrian Ionescu (footballer, born 1958), Romanian footballer
- Adrian Ionescu (footballer, born 1985), Romanian footballer
- Adrian Ioniță (born 2000), Romanian footballer
- Adrian Iordache (born 1980), Romanian footballer
- Adrian Dragoș Iordache (born 1981), Romanian footballer
- Adrian Jevrić (born 1986), German footballer
- Adrián Jusino (born 1992), Bolivian footballer
- Adrian Kappenberger (born 1996), Danish footballer
- Adrian Kasztelan (born 1986), Polish footballer
- Adrian Klepczyński (born 1981), Polish footballer
- Adrian Klimczak (born 1997), Polish footballer
- Adrian Knup (born 1968), Swiss footballer
- Adrián Kocsis (born 1991), Hungarian footballer
- Adrian Kunz (born 1967), Swiss footballer
- Adrián Lapeña (born 1996), Spanish footballer
- Adrián Torres Lázaro (born 1998), Spanish footballer commonly known as Lele
- Adrian Leijer (born 1986), Australian footballer
- Adrián Leites (born 1992), Uruguayan footballer
- Adrian LeRoy (born 1987), Canadian soccer player
- Adrián Leško (born 1995), Slovak footballer
- Adrian Liber (born 2001), Croatian footballer
- Adrian Lis (born 1992), Polish footballer
- Adrian Littlejohn (born 1970), English footballer
- Adrián Lois (born 1989), Spanish footballer
- Adrián López (footballer, born 1987), Spanish footballer
- Adrián López (born 1988), Spanish footballer
- Adrián Lozano (born 1999), Mexican footballer
- Adrian Lucaci (1966–2020), Romanian footballer
- Adrián Lucero (born 1985), Argentine footballer
- Adrián Marín Lugo (born 1994), Mexican footballer
- Adrián Luna (born 1992), Uruguayan footballer
- Adrian Łyszczarz (born 1999), Polish footballer
- Adrian Madaschi (born 1982), Australian footballer
- Adrian Małachowski (born 1998), Polish footballer
- Adrian Marek (born 1987), Polish footballer
- Adrian Mariappa (born 1986), English footballer
- Adrián Marín (footballer, born 1994), Mexican footballer
- Adrián Marín (footballer, born 1997), Spanish footballer
- Adrian Mărkuș (born 1992), Romanian footballer
- Adrián Martín (footballer) (born 1982), Spanish footballer
- Adrián Martínez (Mexican footballer) (born 1970)
- Adrián Martínez (Venezuelan footballer) (born 1993)
- Adrián Emmanuel Martínez (born 1992), Argentine footballer
- Adrián Nahuel Martínez (born 1992), Argentine footballer
- Adrian Matei (footballer) (born 1968), Romanian footballer
- Adrian Mazilu (born 2005), Romanian footballer
- Adrian Mierzejewski (born 1986), Polish footballer
- Adrian Mihalcea (born 1976), Romanian footballer
- Adrian Moescu (born 2001), Romanian footballer
- Adrián Mouriño (born 1988), Spanish footballer
- Adrian Mrowiec (born 1983), Polish footballer
- Adrian Mutu (born 1979), Romanian footballer
- Adrian Nalați (born 1983), Romanian footballer
- Adrian Napierała (born 1982), Polish footballer
- Adrian Neaga (born 1979), Romanian footballer
- Adrian Negrău (born 1968), Romanian footballer
- Adrian Neniță (born 1996), Romanian footballer
- Adrian Nikçi (born 1989), Swiss footballer
- Adrian Romeo Niță (born 2003), Romanian footballer
- Adrian Olah (born 1981), Romanian footballer
- Adrian Olegov (born 1985), Bulgarian footballer
- Adrian Olszewski (born 1993), Polish footballer
- Adrián Ortolá (born 1993), Spanish footballer
- Adrián Palacios (born 2004), Venezuelan footballer
- Adrian Paluchowski (born 1987), Polish footballer
- Adrian Pătraș (born 1984), Moldovan footballer
- Adrian Pătulea (born 1984), Romanian footballer
- Adrián Paz (born 1966), Uruguayan footballer
- Adrian Pelka (born 1981), German footballer
- Adrian Pennock (born 1971), English footballer
- Adrián Peralta (born 1982), Argentine footballer
- Adrian Pereira (born 1999), Norwegian footballer
- Adrian Petre (born 1998), Romanian footballer
- Adrian Pettigrew (born 1986), English footballer
- Adrian Pigulea (born 1968), Romanian footballer
- Adrian Piț (born 1983), Romanian footballer
- Adrian Pitu (born 1975), Romanian footballer
- Adrian Popa (footballer, born 1988), Romanian footballer
- Adrian Popa (footballer, born 1990), Romanian footballer
- Adrian Poparadu (born 1987), Romanian footballer
- Adrian Popescu (born 1960), Romanian footballer
- Adrian Popescu (footballer, born 1975), Romanian footballer
- Adrian Pukanych (born 1981), Ukrainian footballer
- Adrian Pulis (born 1979), Maltese footballer
- Adrian Purzycki (born 1997), Polish footballer
- Adrian Rakowski (born 1990), Polish footballer
- Adrián Ramos (born 1986), Colombian footballer
- Adrián Ricchiuti (born 1978), Argentine footballer
- Adrián Riera (born 1996), Spanish footballer
- Adrián Ripa (born 1985), Spanish footballer
- Adrian Rochet (born 1987), Israeli footballer
- Adrián Rojas (born 1977), Chilean footballer
- Adrian Rolko (born 1978), Czech footballer
- Adrián Romero (Argentine footballer) (born 1975)
- Adrián Romero (Uruguayan footballer) (born 1977)
- Adrian Ropotan (born 1986), Romanian footballer
- Adrián Ruelas (born 1991), American soccer player
- Adrian Rus (born 1996), Romanian footballer
- Adrian Rusu (born 1984), Romanian footballer
- Adrián Sahibeddine (born 1994), French footballer
- Adrian Sălăgeanu (born 1983), Romanian footballer
- Adrián Sánchez (born 1999), Argentine footballer
- Adrián San Miguel del Castillo (born 1987), Spanish football goalkeeper known as simply Adrián
- Adrián Sardinero (born 1990), Spanish footballer
- Adrian Sarkissian (born 1979), Uruguayan footballer
- Adrian Scarlatache (born 1986), Romanian footballer
- Adrian Schlagbauer (born 2002), German footballer
- Adrián Scifo (born 1987), Argentine footballer
- Adrian Šemper (born 1998), Croatian footballer
- Adrian Senin (born 1979), Romanian footballer
- Adrian Serioux (born 1979), Canadian soccer player
- Adrian Sikora (born 1980), Polish footballer
- Adrian Sosnovschi (born 1977), Moldovan footballer and manager
- Adrián Spörle (born 1995), Argentine footballer
- Adrian Spyrka (born 1967), German footballer
- Adrian Stanilewicz (born 2000), German footballer
- Adrian Șter (born 1998), Romanian footballer
- Adrian Stoian (born 1991), Romanian footballer
- Adrian Stoicov (1967–2017), Romanian footballer
- Adrian Șut (born 1999), Romanian footballer
- Adrian Świątek (born 1986), Polish footballer
- Adrián Szekeres (born 1989), Hungarian footballer
- Adrián Szőke (born 1998), Serbian footballer
- Adrian Toma (born 1976), Romanian footballer
- Adrián Torres (born 1989), Argentine footballer
- Adrian Trinidad (born 1982), Argentine footballer
- Adrián Turmo (born 2001), Spanish footballer
- Adrián Ugarriza (born 1997), Peruvian footballer
- Adrian Ursea (born 1967), Romanian footballer and manager
- Adrian Valentić (born 1987), Croatian footballer
- Adrian Vera (born 1997), American footballer
- Adrian Viciu (born 1991), Romanian footballer
- Adrian Viveash (born 1969), English footballer, better known as Adi Viveash
- Adrian Vlas (born 1982), Romanian footballer
- Adrian Ionuț Voicu (born 1992), Romanian footballer
- Adrian Voiculeț (born 1985), Romanian footballer
- Adrian Webster (footballer, born 1951), English footballer and coach
- Adrian Webster (footballer, born 1980), New Zealand footballer
- Adrian Whitbread (born 1971), English footballer and manager
- Adrian Williams, better known as Ady Williams (born 1971), English footballer and manager
- Adrian Winter (born 1986), Swiss footballer
- Adrian Woźniczka (born 1982), Polish footballer
- Adrian Zahra (born 1990), Australian footballer
- Adrian Zaluschi (born 1989), Romanian footballer
- Adrián Zambrano (born 2000), Venezuelan footballer
- Adrián Zela (born 1989), Peruvian footballer
- Adrian Zendejas (born 1995), American footballer
- Adrián Zermeño (born 1979), Mexican footballer

=== Baseball ===
- Adrian Constantine Anson better known as Cap Anson (1852–1922), American baseball player
- Adrián Beltré (born 1979), Dominican Republic baseball player
- Adrian Brown (baseball) (born 1974), American baseball player
- Adrian Burnside (born 1977), Australian baseball player
- Adrian Cárdenas (born 1987), American baseball player
- Adrian Devine (1951–2020), American baseball player
- Adrian Garrett (1943–2021), American baseball player and coach
- Adrián González (born 1982), American-Mexican baseball player
- Adrian Houser (born 1993), American baseball player
- Addie Joss (1880–1911), American baseball pitcher
- Adrian Lynch (1897–1934), American baseball player
- Adrián Morejón (born 1999), Cuban baseball player
- Adrián Nieto (born 1989), Cuban baseball player
- Adrian Sampson (born 1991), American baseball player
- Adrián Sánchez (born 1990), Colombian-Venezuelan baseball player
- Adrián Zabala (1916–2002), Cuban baseball player

=== Basketball ===
- Adrian Autry (born 1972), American basketball player
- Adrian Banks (born 1986), American basketball player
- Adrian Bauk (born 1985), Australian basketball player
- Adrian Branch (born 1963), American basketball player
- Adrian Caldwell (born 1966), American basketball player
- Adrian Celada, Filipino basketball player
- Adrian Dantley (born 1956), American basketball player
- Adrian Griffin (born 1974), American basketball player
- Adrian Pledger (born 1976), American basketball player
- Adrian Smith (basketball) (1936–2026), American basketball player
- Adrian Tudor (born 1985), Romanian basketball player
- Adrian Williams-Strong (born 1977), American basketball player

=== Boxing ===
- Adrian Blair (1943–2008), Australian boxer
- Adrian Clark (boxer) (born 1986), American boxer
- Adrian Diaconu (born 1978), Romanian boxer
- Adrián Hernández (boxer) (born 1986), Mexican boxer
- Adrian Mora (born 1978), American boxer

=== Cricket ===
- Adrian Aymes (born 1964), British cricketer
- Adrian Barath (born 1990), West Indian cricketer
- Adrian Birrell (born 1960), South African cricketer and coach
- Adrian Brown (cricketer) (born 1962), English cricketer
- Adrian Jones (cricketer) (born 1961), English cricketer
- Adrian Rollins (born 1972), English cricketer

=== Ice hockey ===
- Adrian Aucoin (born 1973), Canadian ice hockey player
- Adrian Foster (ice hockey) (born 1982), Canadian ice hockey player
- Adrian Kempe (born 1996), Swedish ice hockey player
- Adrian Wichser (born 1980), Swiss ice hockey player

=== Racing ===
- Adrian Adgar (born 1965), English cyclist
- Adrian Archibald (born 1969), British motorcycle racer
- Adrian Banaszek (born 1993), Polish cyclist
- Adrián Campos (1960–2021), Spanish racing driver
- Adrián Campos Jr. (born 1988), Spanish racing driver
- Adrian Carrio (born 1989), American racing driver
- Adrian "Wildman" Cenni, American off-road racing driver
- Adrián Fernández (born 1965), Mexican racing driver and team owner
- Adrián Fernández (motorcyclist) (born 2004), Spanish motorcycle racer
- Adrián González (cyclist) (born 1992), Spanish cyclist
- Adrian Kurek (born 1988), Polish road bicycle racer
- Adrián Martín (motorcyclist) (born 1992), Spanish motorcycle racer
- Adrian Newey (born 1958), British race car engineer and designer
- Adrian Prosser (1956–2024), Canadian cyclist
- Adrian Quaife-Hobbs (born 1991), British racing driver
- Adrian Aas Stien (born 1992), Norwegian cyclist
- Adrian Sutil (born 1983), German racing driver
- Adrián Vallés (born 1986), Spanish race car driver
- Adrian Zaugg (born 1986), South African racing driver

=== Rugby ===
- Adrian Apostol (born 1990), Romanian rugby player
- Adrian Barich (born 1963), Australian rules footballer and television and radio presenter
- Adrian Barone (born 1987), New Zealand rugby union footballer
- Adrian Bassett (born 1967), Australian rules footballer
- Adrian Battiston (born 1963), Australian rules footballer
- Adrian Beer (born 1943), Australian rules footballer
- Adrian Clarke (rugby union) (born 1938), New Zealand rugby player
- Adrian Davies (born 1969), English rugby player
- Adrian Davis (rugby league) (born 1990), Australian rugby player
- Adrian Garvey (born 1968), Zimbabwean-born South African rugby union player
- Adrian Lungu (born 1960), Romanian rugby player
- Adrian Morley (born 1977), English rugby player
- Adrian Pllotschi (born 1959), Romanian rugby player and coach
- Adrian Stoop (1883–1957), English rugby union player
- Adrian Young (footballer) (1943–2020), Australian rugby player

=== Swimming ===
- Adrian Andermatt (born 1969), Swiss swimmer
- Adrian Moorhouse (born 1964), English swimmer
- Adrian O'Connor (born 1972), Irish backstroke swimmer
- Adrian Radley (born 1976), Australian swimmer
- Adrian Robinson (swimmer) (born 2000), Botswanan swimmer
- Adrian Romero (swimmer) (born 1972), Guamanian swimmer
- Adrian Turner (born 1977), British Olympic swimmer

=== Tennis ===
- Adrian Andreev (born 2001), Bulgarian tennis player
- Adrian Bey (1938–2019), Rhodesian-born American professional tennis player
- Adrian Bodmer (born 1995), Swiss tennis player
- Adrian Bohane (born 1981), Irish-American former professional tennis player
- Adrian Cruciat (born 1983), Romanian tennis player
- Adrian Gavrilă (born 1984), Romanian tennis player
- Adrian Mannarino (born 1988), French tennis player
- Adrian Marcu (born 1961), professional tennis player from Romania
- Adrián Menéndez Maceiras (born 1985), Spanish tennis player
- Adrian Quist (1913–1991), Australian tennis player
- Adrian Ungur (born 1985), Romanian tennis player
- Adrian Voinea (born 1974), Romanian tennis player

=== Other ===
- Adrian Adonis (1954–1988), American professional wrestler
- Adrian Ang (born 1988), Malaysian bowler
- Adrián Annus (born 1973), Hungarian hammer thrower
- Adrian Bachmann (born 1976), Swiss sprint canoer
- Adrian Ballinger (born 1976), British-American climber, skier, and mountain guide
- Adrián Ben (born 1998) Spanish middle-distance runner
- Adrian Berce (1958–1993), Australian field hockey player
- Adrian Blincoe (born 1979), New Zealand runner
- Adrian Błocki (born 1990), Polish racewalker
- Adrian Breen (hurler) (born 1992), Irish hurler
- Adrian Cosma (1950–1996), Romanian handball player
- Adrian Crișan (born 1980), Romanian table tennis player
- Adrián Gavira (born 1987), Spanish beach volleyball player
- Adrian Gomes (born 1990), Brazilian gymnast
- Adrian Gray (born 1981), English darts player
- Adrian Gunnell (born 1972), English snooker player
- Adrian Hansen (born 1971), South African squash player
- Adrian Lewis (born 1985), English darts player
- Adrian Metcalfe (1942–2021), British runner and sports broadcaster
- Adrian Neville (born 1986), English professional wrestler, known professionally as Pac
- Adrian Parker (born 1951), British modern pentathlete and Olympic champion
- Adrian Patrick (born 1973), English former sprinter
- Adrián Alonso Pereira (born 1988), Spanish futsal player
- Adrián Popa (born 1971), Hungarian weightlifter
- Adrian Rollinson (born 1965), British strongman
- Adrian Schultheiss (born 1988), Swedish figure skater
- Adrián Sieiro (born 1992), Spanish canoeist
- Adrian Smith (strongman) (born 1964), British strongman
- Adrian Street (1940–2023), Welsh wrestler and author
- Adrian Strzałkowski (born 1990), Polish long jumper
- Adrián Paz Velázquez (born 1964), Mexican Paralympic athlete
- Adrian Watt (born 1947), American ski jumper
- Adrian White (equestrian) (born 1933), New Zealand equestrian
- Adrian Alejandro Wittwer (born 1986), Swiss extreme athlete and ice swimmer
- Adrian Zieliński (born 1989), Polish weightlifter

== Arts and entertainment ==
- Adrian Adlam (born 1963), British violinist and conductor
- Adrian Aeschbacher (1912–2002), Swiss classical pianist
- Adrian Alandy (born 1980), Filipino actor and model
- Adrian Allinson (1890–1959), British painter, potter and engraver
- Adrián Alonso (born 1994), Mexican actor
- Adrian Alphona, Canadian comic book artist
- Adrian Anantawan (born 1986), Canadian violinist
- Adrian Augier, St. Lucian poet and producer
- Adrian Bică Bădan (born 1988), Romanian footballer
- Adrian Baker (born 1951), English singer, songwriter, and record producer
- Adrian Bărar (1960–2021), Romanian guitarist and composer
- Adrian Barber (1938–2020), English musician and producer
- Adrian Batten (1591–1637), English organist
- Adrian Bawtree (born 1968), English composer and organist
- Adrian Beaumont (born 1937), British composer, conductor, and professor
- Adrian Beers (1916–2004), British double bass player and teacher
- Adrian Belew (born 1949), American guitarist, singer, songwriter, multi-instrumentalist and record producer
- Adrian Biddle (1952–2005), English cinematographer
- Adrian Blevins (born 1964), American poet
- Adrian Borland (1957–1999), English singer, songwriter, guitarist and record producer
- Adrian Boult (1889–1983), English conductor
- Adrian Brown (1929–2019), British director and poet
- Adrian Brown (born 1949), British conductor
- Adrian Brunel (1892–1958), English film director and screenwriter
- Adrian Bustamante (born 1981), American actor
- Adrián Caetano (born 1969), Uruguayan-Argentine film director, producer and screenplay writer
- Adrian Carmack (born 1969), American video game artist
- Adrián Carrio (born 1986), Spanish pianist
- Adrian Chiles (born 1967), British television and radio presenter
- Adrian Clarke (photographer), English photographer
- Adrian Clarke (poet), British poet
- Adrian Conan Doyle (1910–1970), English race-car driver, big-game hunter, explorer, and writer
- Adrian Dingle (artist) (1911–1974), Welsh-Canadian painter and comic book artist
- Adrian Dunbar (born 1958), Northern Ireland actor
- Adrian Edmondson (born 1957), better known as Ade Edmondson, English actor, comedian, director, writer and musician
- Adrian Egan (1944-2025), South African-born Canadian voice actor
- Adrian Enescu (1948–2016), Romanian composer
- Adrian Erlandsson (born 1970), Swedish heavy metal drummer
- Adrian, explain our friend group. 2025 internet meme
- Adrian Fisher (musician) (1952–2000), former guitarist for Sparks (band)
- Adrian Gaxha (born 1984), Macedonian singer-songwriter and producer
- Adrian Ghenie (born 1977), Romanian painter
- Adrian Gonzales (1937–1998), Filipino comic book artist
- Adrián Luis González (born 1939), Mexican potter
- Adrian Gray (born 1961), British artist
- Adrian Adolph Greenburg (1903–1959), costume designer for over 250 films, known as simply Adrian
- Adrian Grenier (born 1976), American actor, producer, director, musician and environmentalist
- Adrian Griffin (drummer), Australian drummer
- Adrian Gurvitz (born 1949), English singer, musician and songwriter
- Adrian Hall (actor) (born 1959), British actor and co-director
- Adrian Hall (artist) (born 1943), British artist
- Adrian Hall (director) (1927–2023), American theatre director
- Adrian Hates (born 1973), German dark wave musician
- Adrian Heath (1920–1992), British painter
- Adrian Heathfield, British writer and curator
- Adrian Hoven (1922–1981), Austrian actor, producer and film director
- Adrian A. Husain (born 1945), Pakistani poet
- Adrian Ivaniţchi (born 1947), Romanian folk musician and guitarist
- Adrian Jones (sculptor) (1845–1938), English sculptor and painter who specialized in animals, particularly horses
- Adrian Jones (born 1978), Swedish musician, member of Gjallarhorn
- Adrian Karsten (1960–2005), American sports reporter
- Adrian Kowanek (born 1977), Polish musician
- Adrian Le Roy (1520–1598), French string player, composer, music publisher and educator
- Adrian Leaper (born 1953), English conductor
- Adrian Legg (born 1948), English guitar player
- Adrian Lester (born 1968), British actor
- Adrian Lucas (born 1962), English organist, tutor, and composer
- Adrian Lulgjuraj (born 1980), Albanian rock singer
- Adrian Lukis (born 1957), British actor
- Adrian Lux (born 1986), Swedish disc jockey and music producer
- Adrian Lyne (born 1941), English filmmaker and producer
- Adrian Maben (1942–2025), British film and television director, writer, and producer
- Adrian Martin (film critic) (born 1959), Australian film and arts critic
- Adrian Martinez (actor) (born 1972), American actor and comedian
- Adrian McKinty (born 1968), Northern Irish writer of crime and mystery novels
- Adrian Minune (born 1974), Romani-Romanian manele singer
- Adrian Mitchell (1932–2008), English poet, novelist, and playwright
- Adrian Molina (born 1985), Mexican-American screenwriter, directo,r and story artist at Pixar Animation Studios
- Adrian William Moore (born 1956), British philosopher and broadcaster
- Adrián Navarro (born 1969), Argentine actor
- Adrian Noble (born 1950), English theatre director
- Adrian Pasdar (born 1965), American actor and film director
- Adrian Paul (born 1959), English actor
- Adrian Pecknold (1920–1999), Canadian mime, director, and author
- Adrian Petriw (born 1987), Canadian actor
- Adrian Picardi (born 1987), American filmmaker
- Adrian Pintea (1954–2007), Romanian actor
- Adrian Piotrovsky (1898–1937), Russian dramaturge
- Adrian Piper (born 1948), American conceptual artist and philosophy professor
- Adrian Rawlins (born 1958), English actor
- Adrian Ludwig Richter (1803–1884), German painter and etcher
- Adrian Rodriguez (DJ), German DJ
- Adrián Rodríguez (born 1988), Spanish actor and singer from Catalonia
- Adrian Rodriguez, American bass guitarist for The Airborne Toxic Event
- Adrian Rollini (1903–1956), American multi-instrumentalist best known for his jazz music
- Adrian Ross (1859–1933), British lyricist
- Adrián Rubio, Mexican actor and model
- Adrian Scarborough (born 1968), English character actor
- Adrian Scott (1912–1972), American screenwriter and film producer
- Adrian Shaposhnikov (1888–1967), Russian classical composer
- Adrian Sherwood (born 1958), English record producer
- Adrian Sînă (born 1977), Romanian singer-songwriter and record producer
- Adrian D. Smith (born 1944), American architect
- Adrian Smith (born 1957), English musician and one of three guitarists/songwriters in the English band Iron Maiden
- Adrian Smith (illustrator), British illustrator
- Adrian Steirn, Australian photographer and filmmaker working in Africa
- Adrian Consett Stephen (1894–1918), Australian artillery officer and playwright
- Adrian Stokes (critic) (1902–1972), British art critic
- Adrian Scott Stokes (1854–1935), English landscape painter
- Adrian Stroe (born 1959), Romanian serial killer
- Adrian Sturges (born 1976), British film producer
- Adrián Suar (born 1968), Argentine actor and media producer
- Adrian Tanner, English writer and director
- Adrian Taylor (producer) (1954–2014), American television news producer
- Adrian Tchaikovsky (born 1972), British fantasy and science fiction author
- Adrián Terrazas-González (born 1975), Mexican jazz composer and wind player
- Adrian Thaws (born 1968), English musician and actor
- Adrian Tomine (born 1974), American cartoonist
- Adrian Utley (born 1957), English musician best known as a member of the band Portishead
- Adrian Vandenberg (born 1954), Dutch rock guitarist
- Adrian Wells (born 1989), British-American clinical psychologist, singer, and songwriter
- Adrian White (musician), Canadian drummer
- Adrian Willaert (c. 1490–1562), Flemish composer of the Renaissance and founder of the Venetian School
- Adrian Wilson (actor) (born 1969), South African model and actor
- Adrian Wilson (artist) (born 1964), British artist and photographer
- Adrian Wong (born 1990), Hong Kong actress
- Adrian Wright (1947–2015), English-Australian actor
- Adrian Young (born 1969), American drummer for the rock band No Doubt
- Adrian Younge (born 1978), American composer, arranger, and music producer
- Adrian Zagoritis (born 1968), British songwriter and record producer
- Adrian Zingg (1734–1816), Swiss painter
- Adrian Zmed (born 1954), American television personality and film actor

== Criminals ==
- Adrian Gonzalez (kidnapper) (born 2000), American kidnapper
- Adrián Gómez González, Mexican drug lord
- Adrián Arroyo Gutiérrez (born 1976), Costa Rican serial killer and rapist, known as The Southern Psychopath
- Adrian Lim (1942–1988), Singaporean serial killer
- Adrian Stroe (born 1959), Romanian serial killer

== Other ==
- Adrian Arendt (born 1952), Romanian sailor
- Adrian Bancker (1703–1772), American silversmith
- Adrian Beecroft (born 1947), British venture capitalist
- Adrian Bell (1901–1980), English ruralist journalist, crossword compiler, and farmer
- Adrian Bellamy (born 1941/1942), British businessman
- Adrian Block (1567–1627), Dutch explorer of the American East Coast
- Adrian Brown (archivist) (born 1969), British archivist
- Adrian Brown (journalist), Australian journalist
- Adrian Cheng (born 1979), Hong Kong entrepreneur and business executive
- Adrian Cioroianu (born 1967), Romanian historian, politician, journalist, and essayist
- Adrian Cronauer (1938–2018), American former lawyer and radio speaker
- Adrian Diel (1756–1839), German physician
- Adrian Finighan (born 1964), British journalist
- Adrian Frutiger (1928–2015), Swiss typeface designer
- Adrian Fulford (born 1953), British judge
- Adrian Geiges (born 1960), German writer and journalist
- Adrian Anthony Gill (1954–2016), British writer and critic
- Adrian Hanauer (born 1966), American businessman and minority owner and general manager of the Seattle Sounders FC
- Adrian Holovaty (born 1981), American web developer, journalist and entrepreneur
- Adrian van Hooydonk (born 1964), Dutch automobile designer
- Adrian Albert Jurgens (1886–1953), South African philatelist
- Adrian Kantrowitz (1918–2008), American cardiac surgeon
- Adrian Kashchenko (1858–1921), Ukrainian writer, historian of the Zaporozhian Cossacks
- Adrian Knox (1863–1932), Australian judge
- Adrian Künzi (born 1973), Swiss banker
- Adrian Lamo (born 1981), Colombian-American threat analyst and "grey hat" hacker
- Adrian Long, British civil engineer
- Adrian Mikhalchishin (born 1954), Ukrainian chess grandmaster
- Adrian von Mynsicht (1603–1638), German alchemist
- Adrian Parr (born 1967), Australian philosopher and cultural critic
- Adrian Păunescu (1943–2010), Romanian poet, journalist, and politician
- Adrian Plass (born 1948), English author and speaker
- Adrian Rogers (1931–2005), American pastor, conservative, and author
- Adrian Andrei Rusu (born 1951), Romanian medieval archaeologist
- Adrian Anthony Spears (1910–1991), American judge
- Adrián Steckel, Mexican businessman
- Adrian Stephen (1883–1948), British author and psychoanalyst, brother of Virginia Woolf and Vanessa Bell
- Adrian Swire (1932–2018), billionaire British heir and businessman
- Adrian Ursu (born 1968), Romanian journalist
- Adrian Weale (born 1964), English writer, journalist, illustrator and photographer
- Adrian Wewer (1836–1914), German-born American architect and Franciscan friar
- Adrian White (businessman) (born 1942), British businessman, founder of Biwater
- Adrian Zecha (born 1933), Indonesian hotelier

== Fictional characters ==
=== Male ===
- Adrien Agreste, a superhero and male protagonist of the French TV series Miraculous: Tales of Ladybug & Cat Noir
- Adrian Chase, a DC Comics superhero
- Adrian Corbo, alias Flex, a Marvel Comics superhero
- Adrian "Fletch" Fletcher, on the British medical dramas Casualty and Holby City
- Adrian Leverkühn, protagonist of Thomas Mann's Doctor Faustus
- Adrian Mole, protagonist of The Secret Diary of Adrian Mole
- Adrian Monk, protagonist of the television series Monk
- Adrian Shephard, protagonist of the Half-Life expansion "Half-Life: Opposing Force"
- Adrian Fahrenheit Ţepeş, alias Alucard, in the Castlevania video games
- Adrian Toomes, alias Vulture, a Marvel Comics villain
- Adrian Veidt, alias Ozymandias, in the Watchmen graphic novel series

=== Female ===
- Adrian Andrews, from the video game Phoenix Wright: Ace Attorney – Justice for All
- Adrian Hall (Home and Away), on the soap opera Home and Away
- Adrian Pennino, wife of Rocky Balboa in the Rocky series

== See also ==
- Adreian
- Hadrien

== Sources ==
- Room, Adrian (2006). Placenames of the world. McFarland & Company. ISBN 978-0-7864-2248-7.
