= Hadrian (disambiguation) =

Hadrian was a Roman Emperor of the 2nd century AD. The name may also refer to:

- Adrian of Canterbury (637-710), also spelled Hadrian, an abbot in Anglo-Saxon England
- Hadrian (TV programme), a 2008 BBC documentary about the travels of the Roman Emperor
- Hadrian (opera), a 2018 opera about the relationship between the Roman Emperor and Antinous
- The Waco CG-4 glider, named "Hadrian" in British service
- G-AAUE Hadrian, a named Handley Page H.P.42 airliner
- Hadrian the Seventh, 1904 novel by Frederick Rolfe

== See also ==
- Adrian (disambiguation)
- Hadran (disambiguation)
- Hadria (disambiguation)
- Hadrianus (disambiguation)
- Hadrien, French given name
