= Adrián Fernández (disambiguation) =

Adrián Fernández (born 1963) is a Mexican former professional race car driver and owner of Fernandez Racing team

Adrián Fernández may also refer to:

- Adrián Fernández Cabrera (born 1967), Mexican politician
- Adrián Fernández (footballer, born 1977), Uruguayan football manager and player
- Adrián Fernández (footballer, born 1980), Argentine football striker
- Adrián Fernández (footballer, born 1992), Paraguayan football forward
- Adrián Fernández (motorcyclist) (born 2004), Spanish motorcycle racer

== See also ==
- Adrián Hernández (disambiguation)
