= Wittwer =

Wittwer is a surname. Notable people with the surname include:

- Adrian Alejandro Wittwer (born 1986), Swiss extreme athlete and ice swimmer
- Andreas Wittwer (born 1990), Swiss professional footballer
- Hans Wittwer (1894–1952), Swiss architect and Bauhaus teacher
- Michael Wittwer (born 1967), German footballer
- Otto Wittwer (born 1937), Swiss professional ice hockey player
- Stefan Wittwer (born 1971), Swiss Nordic skier
- Sylvan Wittwer (1917–2012), American agronomist
- Uwe Wittwer (born 1954), Swiss artist
