= Adrian Clarke =

Adrian Clarke or Clark may refer to:

- Adrian Clark (boxing manager) (born 1986), American boxing manager
- Adrian Clarke (footballer) (born 1974), English footballer
- Adrian Clarke (photographer), English photographer
- Adrian Clarke (poet), English poet
- Adrian Clark, producer, combined pseudonym for Dave Clark and Adrian Kerridge
- Adrian Clarke (rugby union) (born 1938), New Zealand rugby union player
- Adrian Clarke (Canadian football) (born 1991), Canadian football player

== See also ==
- Adrien Clarke (born 1981), American football player
- Adrienne Clarkson (born 1939), Hong Kong-born Canadian journalist and stateswoman who served as Governor General of Canada (1999–2005)
