= Pelka =

Pelka may refer to:

- Pelka, former name of Pelekanos, Kozani, Greece
- Pelka (surname)
- Pełka (archbishop of Gniezno)
