= Jevrić =

Jevrić is a South Slavic surname. Notable people with the surname include:

- Adrian Jevrić, German footballer
- Darinka Jevrić
- Dragoslav Jevrić, Serbian footballer
- Ekrem Jevrić
- Olga Jevrić
