= Bartkowiak =

Bartkowiak is a Polish surname. Notable people with the surname include:

- Adrian Bartkowiak (born 1987), Polish footballer
- Andrzej Bartkowiak (born 1950), Polish cinematographer
- Hans Bartkowiak, Nazi German military officer
- Michał Bartkowiak (born 1997), Polish footballer

== See also ==
- Bartkowiak (film), a 2021 Polish film
