= Steckel =

Steckel is a surname. Notable people with the surname include:

- Adrián Steckel, Mexican businessman
- Anita Steckel (1930–2012), American feminist artist known for paintings and photomontages with sexual imagery
- Brian Steckel (1968–2005), convicted murderer executed in the U.S. state of Delaware
- Dave Steckel (born 1982), American professional ice hockey center
- Eric Steckel (born 1990), American blues singer, guitarist, songwriter, and record producer
- Jan Steckel (born 1962), American writer of poetry, fiction and creative nonfiction
- Leonard Steckel (1901–1971), German actor and director of stage and screen
- Les Steckel (born 1946), the 3rd head coach of the Minnesota Vikings in 1984
- Margret Steckel (born 1934), Luxembourgian writer of German birth
- Richard H. Steckel (born 1944), American heterodox economist with a focus on economic history
- Roy E. Steckel (1887–1950), Los Angeles Police Department Chief of Police 1929–1933
- Wilhelm Steckel (1868–1940), Austrian physician and psychologist, one of Sigmund Freud's earliest followers
- William Steckel (1921–2002), former Republican member of the Pennsylvania House of Representatives

== See also ==
- Daniel Steckel House, historic home at Bath, Northampton County, Pennsylvania
- Troxell-Steckel House, historic home at Egypt, Whitehall Township, Lehigh County, Pennsylvania
- Steckel mill, similar to a reversing rolling mill except two coilers are used to feed the material through the mill
