= DFS Group =

Hong Kong luxury travel retailer

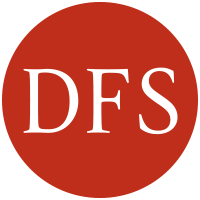
- Native name: 迪斐世
- Type: Subsidiary
- Industry: Travel retail
- Founded: 7 November 1960; 65 years ago, in Hong Kong
- Founders: Robert Warren Miller; Charles Feeney
- Headquarters: 8/F, Chinachem Golden Plaza, 77 Mody Road, Tsim Sha Tsui East, Hong Kong
- Area served: Worldwide
- Key people: Ed Brennan (chairman and CEO); Zac Coughlin
- Products: Consumer goods
- Parent: LVMH
- Website: www.dfs.com

DFS Group (DFS, Chinese: 迪斐世) is a global travel retailer of luxury products based in Hong Kong. Established in 1960, its global network consists of stores located in major global airports and downtown locations featuring over 750 brands. It is privately held and majority owned by the luxury conglomerate Moët Hennessy Louis Vuitton (LVMH), alongside DFS co-founder and shareholder Robert Warren Miller. As of January 11, 1997, DFS Group operates as a subsidiary of LVMH. DFS is headquartered in Hong Kong SAR.

== History ==
=== Beginnings ===
In 1960, American entrepreneurs Charles Feeney and Robert Warren Miller founded Tourists International, which later became Duty Free Shoppers (DFS), in Hong Kong. In 1962, two DFS stores were opened at the international airports in Hong Kong and Honolulu, the first duty-free shop in the United States.

=== Expansion ===
In the 1960s and 1970s DFS Group significantly expanded their operation in Pacific Islands and North America. DFS capitalized on the rising wave of Asian tourists who began to travel further overseas, opening stores in international airports and later in downtown locations where travelers have their purchases delivered before departure. In 1968, DFS opened its first downtown duty-free store in Kowloon, Hong Kong, followed shortly thereafter by Honolulu and eventually expanding to 14 locations all over the world.

=== Acquisition ===
In 1996, LVMH acquired the majority share of DFS Group, buying out partners Feeney, Parker, and Pilaro and setting a new focus on the combined elements of travel and luxury. In 2004, the company moved its headquarters to Hong Kong from San Francisco, California as part of a corporate restructure.

=== Branding Initiatives ===
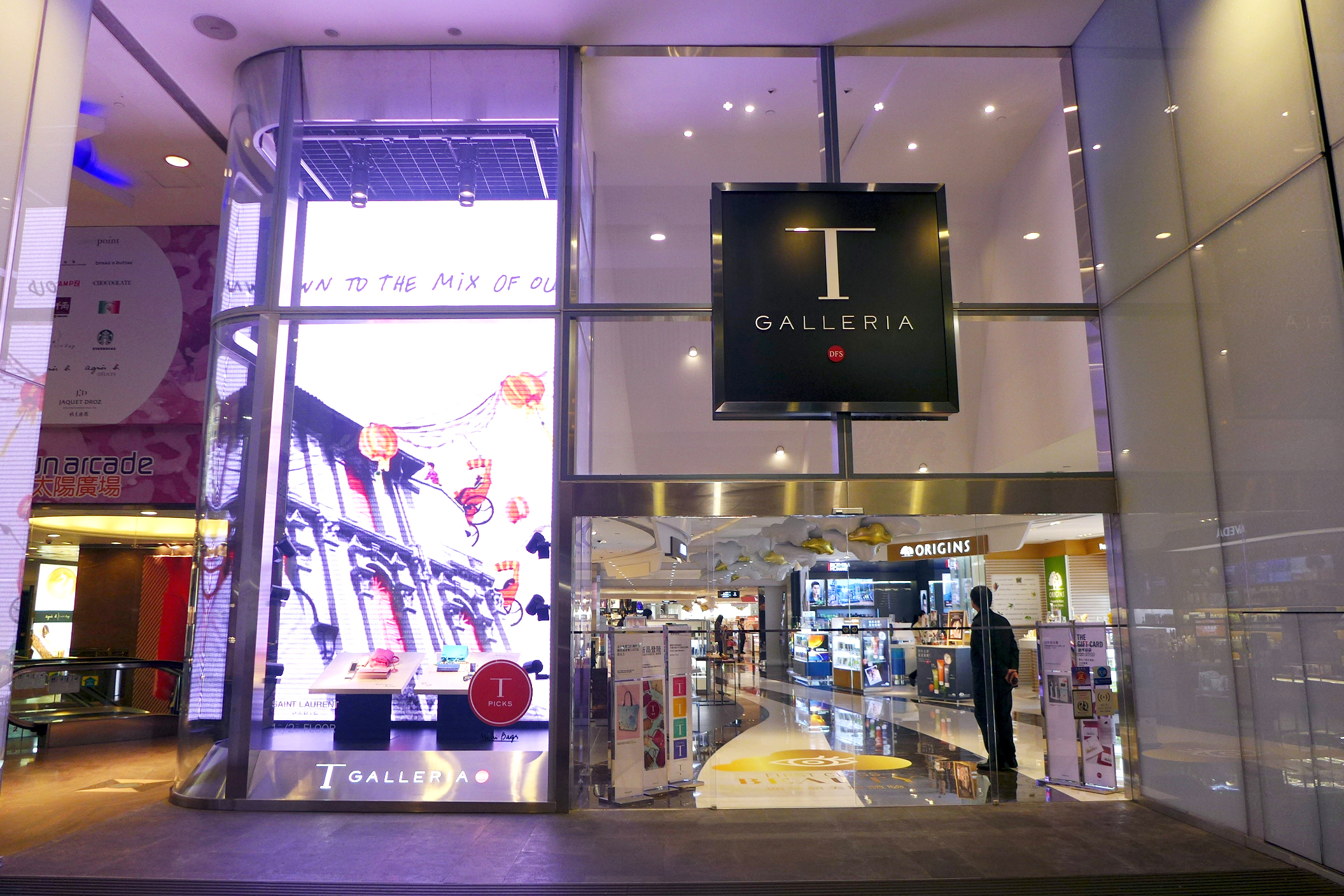
DFS T Galleria in Tsim Sha Tsui, Hong Kong

In 2013 DFS undertook a major branding initiative. It re-branded its downtown Galleria Stores “T Galleria” and moved to a strategy of localization for airports, working with local suppliers to increase its mix of “destination” products. In 2015 it launched T Galleria Beauty by DFS, a standalone beauty concept store in Hong Kong and Macau. In 2016 DFS expanded its operations, opening a significantly extended space at T Galleria by DFS, City of Dreams in Macau, and its first European store, T Fondaco dei Tedeschi in Venice, Italy.

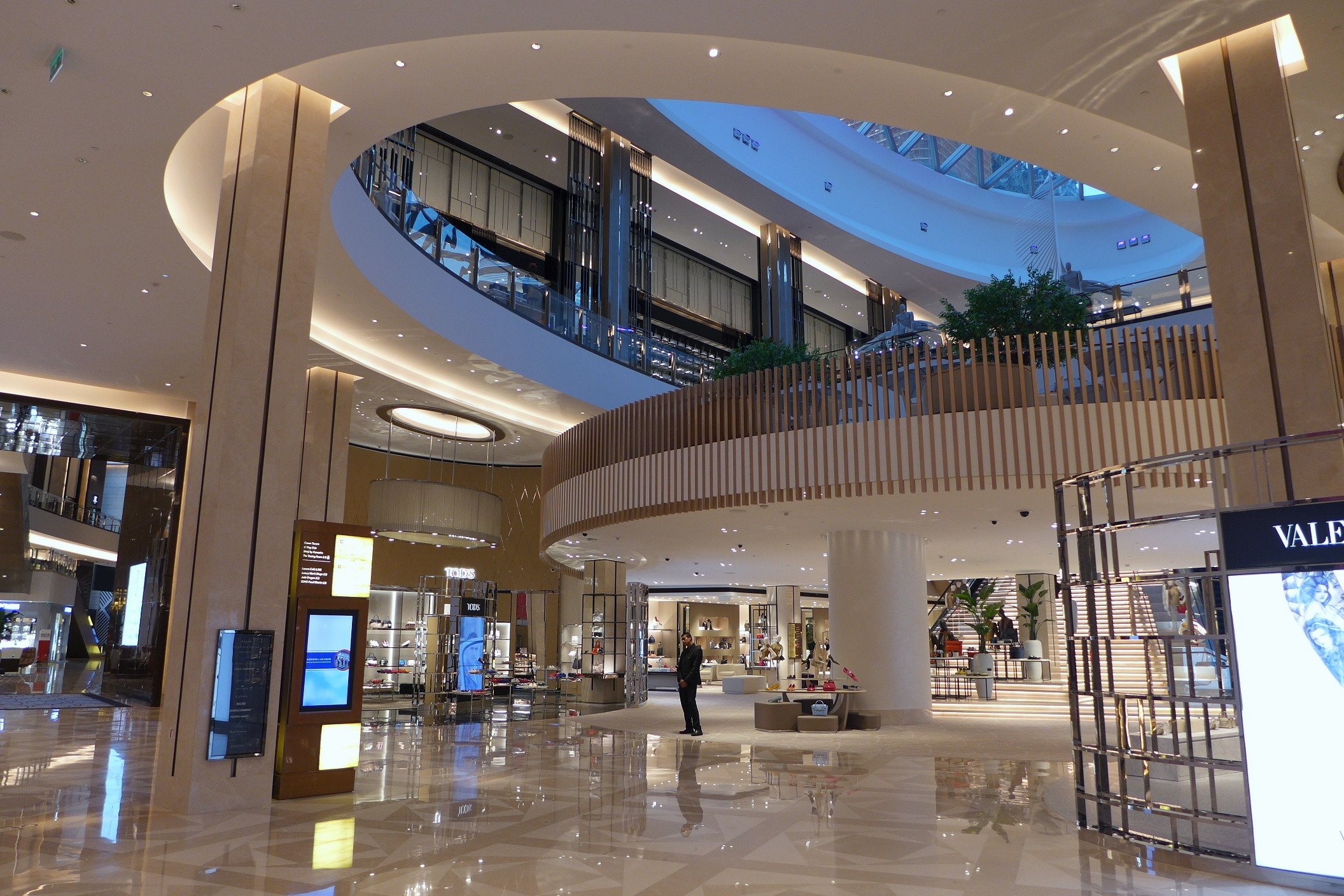
DFS T Galleria in City of Dreams, Macau

=== 2020 – Present ===
In 2022, DFS opened its first "Resort Galleria" concept at DFS Queenstown in New Zealand and its eighth store in Macau at The Londoner Macao with unique Londoner-themed accents.

In 2023, DFS opened its first China domestic airport store at Chongqing Jiangbei International Airport. In the same year, DFS launched a new global loyalty program, DFS CIRCLE, and introduced its new Chinese name "迪斐世" (pinyin: dí fēi shì; Jyutping: dik6 fei2 sai3). DFS launched the Beauty Collective concept at DFS Hong Kong, Causeway Bay.

In 2024, DFS transitioned from T Galleria towards a singular DFS brand identity for its airport and downtown stores.

DFS Group's share in La Samaritaine were sold back to LVMH in February 2025. In July 2025 it was announced that as part of a restructuring DFS would exit Oceania.

In January 2026, DFS sold its travel retail business and a series of "DFS brands and intellectual properties" in China, Hong Kong, and Macau (excluding the City of Dreams store) to China Tourism Group Duty Free.

== Leadership ==
=== CEOs ===
1. Adrian Bellamy (1983–1995)
2. Myron E. Ullman (1995–1998)
3. Brian Kendrick (1998–1999)
4. Ed Brennan (1999–2012)
5. Philip Schaus (2012–2017)
6. Benjamin Vuchot (2020–2024)
7. Ed Brennan (2024–)

== Galleria locations ==
T Galleria by DFS (known as DFS Galleria till 2013) is the branding used on the mid-to-large size DFS stores that are not located in airports. The format of most T Galleria locations is similar to a department store. Beauty stores also operate under the brand in Hong Kong and Macau. As of 2025 most T Galleria stores are in Macau (5 locations) and Hong Kong (2 locations).

=== Operating ===
| Name | Location | | Opening year | Ref. |
|---|---|---|---|---|
| DFS Waikiki | Honolulu | United States | 1975 | |
| DFS Okinawa | Okinawa | Japan | 2004 | |
| DFS Studio City | Macau | | 2015 | |
| DFS MGM Cotai | Macau | | 2018 | |
| DFS Shoppes at Londoner | Macau | | 2022 | |
| DFS Shoppes at Four Seasons | Macau | | | |
| DFS City of Dreams | Macau | | | |
| DFS Canton Road | Hong Kong | | | |
| DFS Tsim Sha Tsui East | Hong Kong | | | |

=== Closed ===
| Name | Location | | Year opened | Year closed |
|---|---|---|---|---|
| DFS Saipan | Saipan | Northern Mariana Islands | 1976 | 2025 |
| DFS Sydney | Sydney | Australia | 1989 | 2025 |
| DFS Auckland | Auckland | New Zealand | 1990s | 2025 |
| DFS Guam | Tumon | Guam | 1995 | 2026 |
| DFS Hollywood | Los Angeles | United States | 2003 | |
| DFS Gold Coast | Surfers Paradise | Australia | 2004 | |
| DFS Angkor | Siem Reap | Cambodia | 2016 | 2020s |
| T Fondaco dei Tedeschi | Venice | Italy | 2016 | 2025 |
| DFS Bali | Kuta | Indonesia | | 2020s |
| DFS Singapore | Singapore | Singapore | | 2020s |
| DFS Cairns | Cairns | Australia | 1990s | 2023 |
| DFS La Samaritaine | Paris | France | 2021 (Note: Open under other management from 1870 to 2005, minority shareholding) | 2025 |
| DFS Queenstown | Queenstown | New Zealand | 2022 | 2025 |

=== Cancelled ===
| Name | Location | | Projected opening | Cancelled |
|---|---|---|---|---|
| DFS Queen's Wharf | Brisbane | Australia | 2024 | Lease terminated 2023. |

== See also ==
- List of duty-free shops
