= Adriaen =

Adriaen is a Dutch form of Adrian. Notable people with the name include:

- Adriaen Banckert (1615–1684), Dutch admiral
- Adriaen Block (1567–1627), Dutch private trader and navigator
- Adriaen Brouwer (1605–1638), Flemish genre painter
- Adriaen de Vries (1556–1626), Northern Mannerist sculptor born in the Netherlands
- Adriaen Hanneman (1603–1671), seventeenth-century Dutch painter
- Adriaen Isenbrandt (1480–1551), Flemish Northern Renaissance painter
- Adriaen Maertensz Block (1582–1661), successively captain, commander, and governor of the Ambon Island
- Adriaen van Bergen devised the plot to recapture the city of Breda from the Spanish during the Eighty Years' War
- Adriaen van de Velde (1636–1672), Dutch animal and landscape painter
- Adriaen van de Venne (1589–1662), versatile Dutch Baroque painter
- Adriaen van der Cabel (1631–1705), Dutch painter of the Dutch school
- Adriaen van der Donck (1618–1655), lawyer and landowner in New Netherland
- Adriaen van der Werff (1659–1722), accomplished Dutch painter
- Adriaen van Nieulandt the younger (1587–1658), Dutch painter and engraver
- Adriaen van Ostade (1610–1685), Dutch genre painter
- Adriaen van Utrecht (1599–1652), Flemish Baroque still life painter
