= Pelka (surname) =

Pelka is a surname. Notable people with the surname include:

- Adrian Pelka (born 1981), German footballer
- Daniel Pelka (2007–2012), child abuse victim
- Hartmut Pelka (1957–2014), German footballer
- Kazia Pelka (born 1962), English actress
- Valentine Pelka (born 1956), English actor
