= Richard Henderson (Kentucky politician) =

American politician

Member of the Kentucky House of Representatives from the 74th district
- In office January 1, 2007 – January 1, 2015
- Preceded by: Adrian Arnold
- Succeeded by: David Hale

Mayor of Jeffersonville, Kentucky
- In office January 2003 – January 2007
- Preceded by: Josephine Martin
- Succeeded by: Anthony Henderson

Personal details
- Born: Richard Dale Henderson; March 15, 1971 (age 55) Mount Sterling, Kentucky, U.S.
- Party: Republican (since 2025)
- Other political affiliations: Democratic (1989–2023) Independent (2023–2025)
- Spouse: Linda
- Children: 2

Richard Dale Henderson (born March 15, 1971) is an American retired politician who served four consecutive terms as a member of the Kentucky House of Representatives for the 74th district from January 2007 to January 2015. Before serving in Frankfort, Henderson served one term as the Mayor of Jeffersonville, Kentucky from January 2003 to January 2007.

== Biography ==
Henderson was born March 15, 1971, in Montgomery County, Kentucky. He was first elected to political office in 2002, serving as the mayor of Jeffersonville, Kentucky. In 2006, Henderson decided against running for mayoral re-election in order to run for the Kentucky House of Representatives seat held by the retiring Adrian Arnold. Henderson would win the primary and the general elections, and go on to serve four consecutive terms. On November 4, 2014, he lost re-election to Republican candidate David Hale. On May 19, 2015, after failing to earn a fifth house term, Henderson filed to run for Kentucky State Treasurer. He would finish third in the statewide Democratic primary with 32,914 votes behind Neville Blakemore's 36,663 votes and the winner Rick Nelson's 44,397 votes. In 2023, after an eight-year hiatus, Henderson filed to run as an independent in the Special Election for the Kentucky Senate District 28 seat. On May 16, Henderson would finish third in the election with 3,001 votes behind Democrat Robert Sainte's 4,968 votes and the winner Republican Greg Elkins' 7,899 votes. Henderson would announce his retirement from politics in the local newspaper.

== Elections ==
- 2023: Henderson was the Independent candidate in a Special Election for the Kentucky Senate District 28 on May 16, 2023. Henderson would finish third in the election with 3,001 votes behind Democrat Robert Sainte's 4,968 votes and the winner Republican Greg Elkins' 7,899 votes.
- 2015: Henderson filed to run for Kentucky State Treasurer on January 16, 2015. Henderson was part of a five-candidate Democratic primary on May 19, 2015. Henderson would finish third in the statewide primary with 32,914 votes behind Neville Blakemore's 36,663 votes and the winner Rick Nelson's 44,397 votes.
- 2014: Henderson was unopposed in the May 20, 2014, Democratic primary, and lost to Republican nominee David Hale in the November 4, 2014, General Election 8,346 votes (52.8%) to 7,453 votes (47.2%).
- 2012: Henderson was unopposed for both the May 22, 2012, Democratic primary, and the November 6, 2012, general election, winning with 11,562 votes.
- 2010: Henderson was challenged in the May 18, 2010 Democratic primary, winning with 6,007 votes (54.0%) and would win the November 2, 2010, general election, with 8,223 votes (63.5%) against Republican nominee Jeff Moore.
- 2008: Henderson and returning 2006 Republican opponent Woodrow Wells both won their 2008 primaries, setting up a rematch; Henderson won the November 4, 2008, general election with 11,994 votes (73.0%) against Wells.
- 2006: When District 74 Representative Adrian Arnold retired and left the seat open, Henderson won the seven-way 2006 Democratic primary with 2,771 votes (26.6%) and won the November 7, 2006, general election with 8,868 votes (72.7%) against Republican nominee Woodrow Wells.
