= David Hale (Kentucky politician) =

American politician

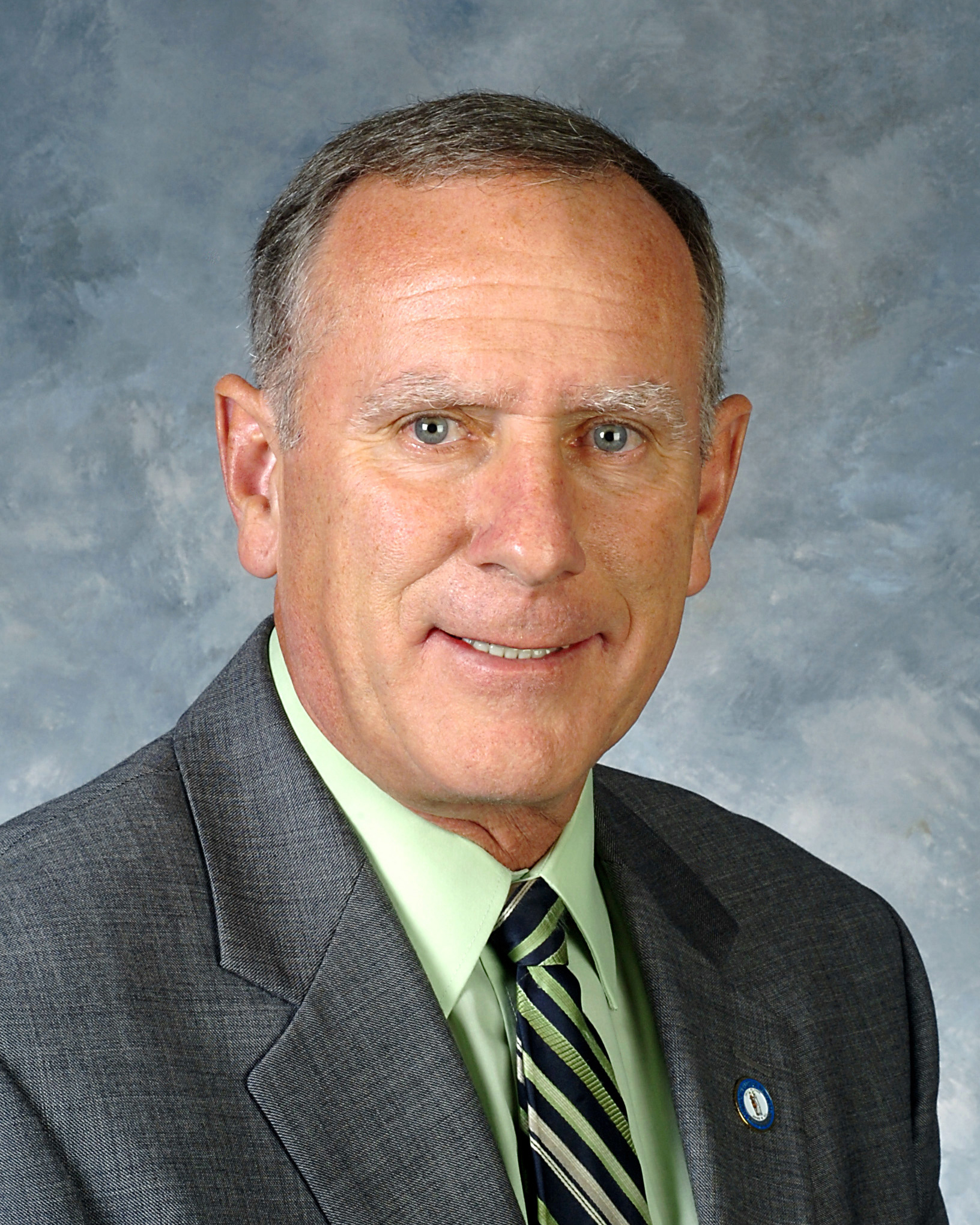

Member of the Kentucky House of Representatives from the 74th district
- Incumbent
- Assumed office January 1, 2015
- Preceded by: Richard Henderson

Personal details
- Party: Republican
- Children: 2
- Occupation: Pastor
- Committees: State Government (Chair); Agriculture; Primary and Secondary Education; Transportation

Charles David Hale is an American politician serving as a Republican member of the Kentucky House of Representatives from Kentucky's 74th House district. His district includes Bath, Menifee, and Montgomery County. Hale did not seek reelection in 2026.

== Background ==
Hale graduated from Menifee County High School in 1974.

Until his retirement in 2004, Hale was employed by the Kentucky Department of Fish and Wildlife Resources at the Minor Clark State Fish Hatchery. Hale identifies with the Church of God, and is the senior pastor of The Korea Church of God in Wellington, Kentucky.

== Political career ==
=== Elections ===
- 2014 Hale won the 2014 Republican primary with 1,387 votes (71.5%) and won the 2014 Kentucky House of Representatives election with 8,346 votes (52.8%) against Kentucky's 74th House district Democratic incumbent Richard Henderson.
- 2016 Hale was unopposed in the 2016 Republican primary and won the 2016 Kentucky House of Representatives election with 10,894 votes (57.2%) against Democratic candidate James Davis.
- 2018 Hale was unopposed in the 2018 Republican primary and won the 2018 Kentucky House of Representatives election with 9,163 votes (51.2%) against Democratic candidate James Davis.
- 2020 Hale was unopposed in the 2020 Republican primary and won the 2020 Kentucky House of Representatives election with 15,230 votes (72.4%) against Democratic candidate Jeff Spradling.
- 2022 Hale was unopposed in the 2022 Republican primary and won the 2022 Kentucky House of Representatives election with 10,764 votes (70.4%) against Democratic candidate Bennie Deskins.
- 2024 Hale was unopposed in both the 2024 Republican primary and the 2024 Kentucky House of Representatives election, winning the latter with 17,010 votes.
