= Adrian Arnold =

American politician (1932–2018)

Member of the Kentucky House of Representatives from the 74th district
- In office January 1, 1974 – January 1, 2007
- Preceded by: Charles Hart
- Succeeded by: Richard Henderson

Personal details
- Born: April 27, 1932 Paris, Kentucky, United States
- Died: December 15, 2018 (aged 86) Georgetown, Kentucky, United States
- Party: Democratic

Adrian King Arnold (April 27, 1932 - December 15, 2018) was an American politician in the state of Kentucky. He served in the Kentucky House of Representatives as a Democrat from 1974 to 2007. He was first elected to the house in 1973 when Democratic incumbent Charles B. Hart retired to run for Judge/Executive of Bath County. Arnold did not seek reelection in 2006.
