= Adrian Berce =

Australian field hockey player

Adrian Berce (11 July 1958 – 14 February 1993) was an Australian field hockey player. He competed at the 1984 Summer Olympics in Los Angeles, where the Australian team placed fourth. He died of cancer in 1993.
