= Hadran =

Hadran may refer to:

- Hadran (Talmud), a special prayer said upon the completion of study of a tractate of the Talmud
- Hadran (organization), a women's Talmud study organization based in Jerusalem, Israel
- Hadran, Yemen, a village in west-central Yemen
