= Adrian Șter =

Romanian professional footballer

Personal information
- Full name: Adrian Cristian Marian Șter
- Date of birth: 19 April 1998 (age 28)
- Place of birth: Baia Mare, Romania
- Height: 1.78 m (5 ft 10 in)
- Position: Forward

Team information
- Current team: CSM Bacău
- Number: 10

Youth career
- 2011–2012: Salin Ocna Șugatag
- 2013–2014: CFR Cluj
- 2014–2015: Baia Mare

Senior career*
Years	Team	Apps	(Gls)
2015–2016	Baia Mare	10	(0)
2016–2017	Comuna Recea	27	(8)
2018	CFR II Cluj	33	(10)
2019	FC U Craiova	4	(4)
2019	Minaur Baia Mare	11	(2)
2020–2021	Hermannstadt	4	(0)
2020–2021	Ceahlăul Piatra Neamț	15	(6)
2022–2023	SCM Zalău	16	(12)
2023	Satu Mare	9	(1)
2024	Minaur Baia Mare	7	(0)
2024–	CSM Bacău	0	(0)
- * Club domestic league appearances and goals as of 09:22, 22 November 2024 (UTC)

Adrian Cristian Marian Șter (born 19 April 1998) is a Romanian professional footballer who plays as a forward for Liga III side CSM Bacău. In his career, Șter also played for teams such as Minaur Baia Mare, Comuna Recea, CFR II Cluj or FC U Craiova 1948.
