= Adrian Henger =

Polish footballer

Personal information
- Date of birth: 18 May 1996 (age 30)
- Place of birth: Goleniów, Poland
- Height: 1.89 m (6 ft 2 in)
- Position: Goalkeeper

Team information
- Current team: Ina Goleniów
- Number: 33

Youth career
- Ina Goleniów

Senior career*
Years	Team	Apps	(Gls)
2012–2014	Ina Goleniów		
2015–2018	Pogoń Szczecin	4	(0)
2015–2018	Pogoń Szczecin II	21	(0)
2018–2022	Ina Goleniów		
2022–2023	Vineta Wolin	1	(0)
2023–	Ina Goleniów	68	(0)
- * Club domestic league appearances and goals as of 18:52, 24 June 2025 (UTC)

Adrian Henger (born 18 May 1996) is a Polish footballer who plays as a goalkeeper for IV liga West Pomerania club Ina Goleniów.

== Honours ==
Ina Goleniów

- Regional league West Pomerania I: 2022–23
