= Adrián Arroyo Gutiérrez =

Costa Rican serial killer and rapist

- Born: Adrián Javier Arroyo Gutiérrez; 1976 (age 49–50); San José, Costa Rica
- Other names: "The Southern Psychopath" "The Indingent Killer"
- Conviction: Murder
- Penalty: 110 years' imprisonment

Details
- Victims: 6–11
- Span of crimes: 2014–2015
- Country: Costa Rica
- State: San José
- Date apprehended: December 2015

Adrián Javier Arroyo Gutiérrez (born 1976), known as The Southern Psychopath, is a Costa Rican serial killer and rapist who killed between 6 and 11 women in several of San José's neighborhoods. He was sentenced to 110 years' imprisonment for his crimes.

== Murders ==
Arroyo, a scrap collector residing in Barrio Mexico, would typically search for women who exchanged sexual favors for drugs. He would pick up the victim and lure them to a secluded parking lot, where he would subsequently rape and strangle them. After killing the woman, Arroyo would cover their private parts with leaves, leaving the bodies sitting with their legs hunched, before fleeing the scene.

Although a total of 11 women were found to have been murdered in this way, all in areas in which "the Southern Psychopath" operated, Arroyo's guilt was established in the deaths of six:

- April 10, 2015: an odious smell alerted neighbors of the Mayorga Urbanization section of San Sebastián, who found the decomposing body of Natalia Salazar Flores in a vacant lot.
- June 24, 2015: in Hatillo, the body of the fourth victim was found in a vacant lot near Rancho Guanacaste. At the time of discovery, it appeared that the woman had no visible signs of assault. According to the OIJ, it's possible that she was homeless.
- July 14, 2015: in San Sebastián, the body of 27-year-old Alicia Carmona, a habitual to the area, was found in a vacant lot under some bushes, by a neighbor. The following day, it was discovered that also had signs of strangulation.
- July 26, 2015: in Hatillo, the half-naked body of Tania Barrantes was located by a passer-by under a pedestrian bridge, partially covered with plywood. The homeless woman had suffered abrasions on her lower limbs, as well as blows to the face, mouth and back of the head, the last most likely dealt with a blunt weapon. It was estimated that she had been killed six hours prior to her discovery.
- August 6, 2015: in Sagrada Familia, the body of an unidentified woman was located at about 2:40 p.m.

== Capture, trial and sentence ==
The authorities got in contact with local prostitutes in the area, offering protection in exchange for information. During one such occasion, a woman revealed that she had been sexually abused by a man resembling Arroyo, whom she had also seen in the company of three of the victims. This, coupled with other evidence, led to the suspect's arrest, and after subsequent forensic tests were carried out on semen samples, more sexual assaults committed by the scrap collector were discovered.

As a result, Arroyo was brought to trial, convicted in 6 of the murders and 2 of the rapes, and sentenced to 110 years' imprisonment in 2016. However, according to Costa Rican law, he will serve out only 50 years of the sentence, as that is considered the maximum penalty in the country. OIJ agents who participated in the investigation were later awarded for their efforts.

== See also ==
- List of serial killers by country
- List of serial killers by number of victims
