= Adrian Brown (journalist) =

Australian journalist

Adrian Brown is a journalist who works for Al Jazeera.

He recently relocated to Sydney after spending nearly 16 years managing a reporting and camera company based in Hong Kong. Throughout this period, he also contributed stories to National Nine News. Among his notable coverage are the 1989 Student uprising in China, the 1991 Gulf War, the September 11 attacks and events in East Timor.

His more recent assignments encompass reporting on the Middle East conflict, covering the Football World Cup in Germany, and documenting the aftermath and recovery efforts following the 2004 Boxing Day Tsunami. Currently, he provides reporting for both Seven News and SBS's Dateline, contributing to a range of local, national, and international stories.
