= Adrian Künzi =

Swiss private banker (born 1973)

Adrian Künzi (born in 1973) is a Swiss private banker. He was appointed CEO of Notenstein Private Bank in 2012. Since 2018, he has been working for Bank UBP. Since autumn 2020 he has been in charge of the bank's European Markets.

== Background ==
Adrian Künzi has a doctorate in Finance from the University of St. Gallen as well as a master's degree in Management Studies from the University of Cambridge (UK). Between 2001 and 2003 he worked in investment banking at Goldman Sachs (Frankfurt). Thereafter he served as Head of the Investment Office at Wegelin & Co. Private Bankers. Starting 2007 he was a Managing Partner with unlimited liability until 2012. He established the Wegelin's presence in French-speaking Switzerland and was responsible for the development of the business with institutional clients and family offices. In January 2012 Adrian Künzi was appointed CEO of Notenstein Private Bank. Since 2018, he has been working for the Geneva-based Private Bank UBP. He is CEO of the bank's operations in Zurich and in September 2020, he has taken over the additional responsibilities for London, Luxembourg and Lugano. Further he holds selected mandates.

== Links ==
- Notenstein Private Bank, Website
- The Wall Street Journal, 28.08.2013
- St. Galler Tagblatt, 28.01.2012
