= Adrian Hall (artist) =

Conceptual and performance artist (b. 1943)

- Born: Adrian Reginald Hall; 29 August 1943 (age 83); Cornwall, UK
- Education: Plymouth College of Art, U.K.; Royal College of Art, London; Yale School of Art
- Known for: Conceptual art, performance art, sculpture
- Notable work: Check Piece, BANANACONDA, Bricks in Aspic, Low Tide
- Movement: Avant-garde, Post-Object art
- Awards: Peter Stuyvesant Young Contemporaries Prize, Hansells Award for Environmental Sculpture, Art in Context Public Sculpture, P.J. Carrolls Prize for Sculpture
- Website: adrianhall.space

Adrian Hall (born 29 August 1943 in Cornwall) is a conceptual and performance artist, educator, and activist. He is renowned for his pioneering contributions to post-object art and avant-garde practices, as well as his stoic activism, teaching at top academic art institutions worldwide, and his writings.

Over a career spanning several decades, Hall has taught at prestigious institutions and his work has influenced art movements internationally, particularly in the United Kingdom, the United States, New Zealand, and Northern Ireland.

== Early life ==
Hall was born on 29 August 1943 in Cornwall, England. He attended the Plymouth College of Art before studying at the Royal College of Art in London between 1964 and 1967. During this time, he worked as an artist assistant to Yoko Ono, featuring in several of her performances, including Film No. 4 [Bottoms] (1966). While at the Royal College, he studied philosophy with Iris Murdoch, who introduced him to the works of Ludwig Wittgenstein.

In 1968, Hall moved to the United States to pursue a Master of Fine Arts at the Yale School of Art and Architecture. During his time at Yale, he worked as a fabricator for the renowned sculptor Naum Gabo and formed a close friendship with minimalist sculptor Fred Sandback, whose focused and consistent artistic approach contrasted with Hall's more experimental and multifaceted style.

== Career ==
After completing his studies at Yale University, Adrian Hall began teaching at the UCLA School of the Arts and Architecture. Following his time in the United States, Hall taught at art schools and exhibited internationally, living and working in Northern Ireland, New Zealand, Australia, and the United Kingdom.

In the 1970s, Hall exhibited regularly with the David Hendriks Gallery in Dublin and was awarded the prestigious *P.J. Carrolls Prize for Sculpture* at the Irish Exhibition of Living Art in 1975.

During his time in Australia, Hall served as the head of sculpture at the Sydney College of the Arts (SCA) from 1979 to 1984. He was instrumental in establishing the postgraduate programme for the School of Media Art at COFA (College of Fine Arts, University of New South Wales) and served as its head during the early 1990s.

Since 2011, Hall has been an adjunct artist at the Dunedin School of Art in New Zealand.

== Personal life ==
Adrian Hall currently resides in Aramoana, Otago, New Zealand. His life and work reflect his strong commitment to activism and community engagement, as seen in his collaborations with artists and organisations across the globe. Hall often draws on his working-class background, incorporating his artisan skills and a sense of precision into his sculptures and installations.

== Public collections ==
Adrian Hall's works are held in the following public collections around the world:

- Arts Council of Great Britain, UK
- Bathurst Regional Gallery, Australia
- Contemporary Irish Art Society, Ireland
- Derry City Council Collection, Northern Ireland
- Hocken Library, University of Otago, New Zealand
- Irish Museum of Modern Art (IMMA), Dublin, Ireland
- National Art Gallery, New Zealand
- New University of Coleraine, Northern Ireland
- Northern Ireland Arts Council Collection, Northern Ireland
- Tolly Cobbold Collection, UK
- Ulster Museum, Northern Ireland
- University of Auckland, New Zealand
- University Collection, Trinity College, Dublin, Ireland
- University of Sydney, Australia
- University of Western Australia, Australia
- Seoul International Fine Arts Centre, Korea
- National Self-Portrait Collection of Ireland, Limerick, Ireland
- Auckland City Art Gallery, New Zealand
