= Adrian Geiges =

German writer and journalist (born 1960)

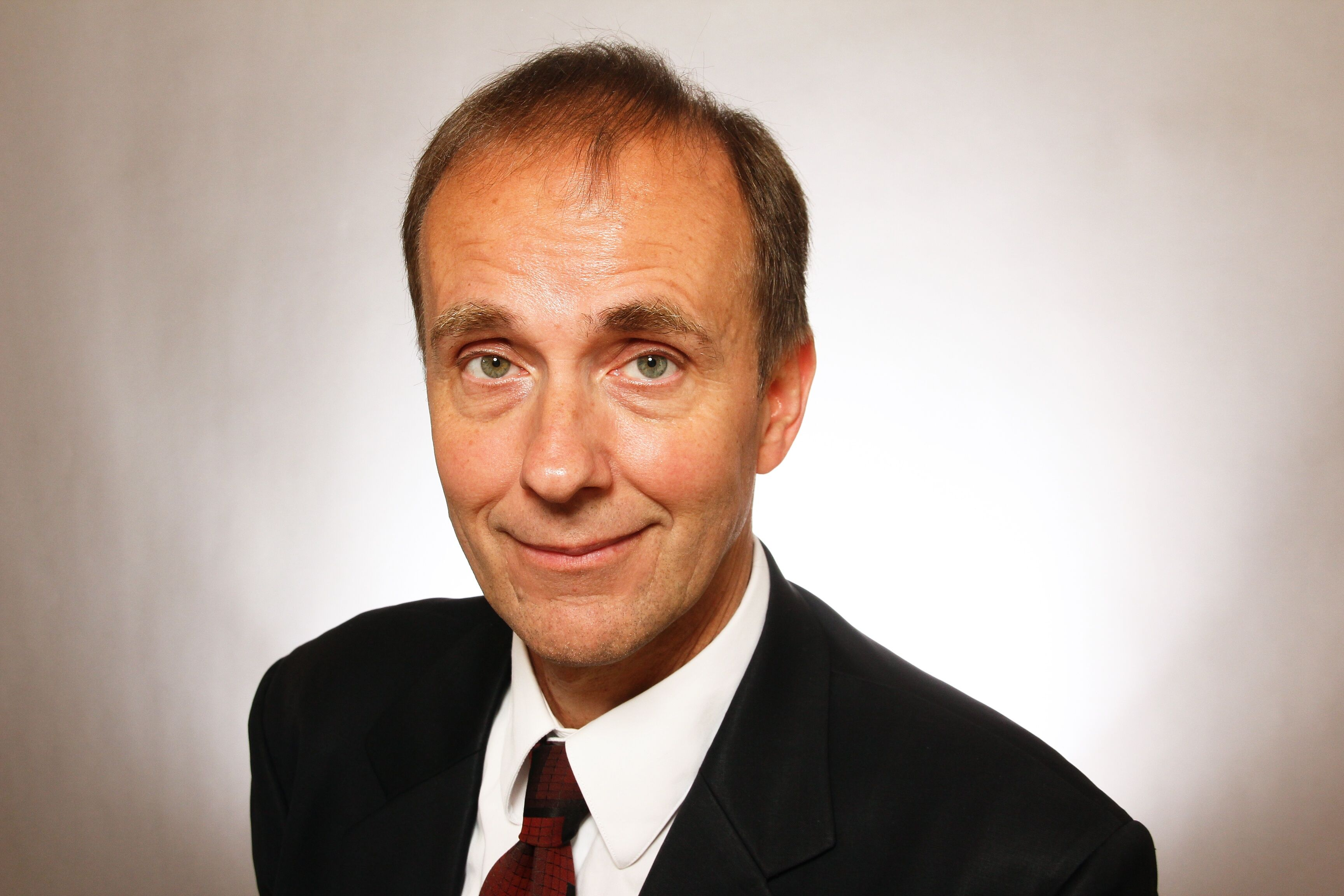
Adrian Geiges 2012

Adrian Geiges (born 3 September 1960) is a German writer and journalist born in Basel, Switzerland.

== Life ==
Adrian Geiges is a journalist from the Black Forest in southern Germany. In his autobiography, “How the World Revolution Once Accidentally Started in the Black Forest“, he describes how he transformed from a West German communist to a capitalist, ironically in the People’s Republic of China. He had a year-long training at a secret cadre school in former communist East Germany.

His autobiography describes moral conflicts, typical of the many in his country of his generation who started as extreme leftists and evolved at breakneck speed into aggressive capitalists. These developments in Geiges’ political and work commitments led to far-reaching changes in his personal life, including in his love and sex life.

In German media his book has been seen as a biography of a lost generation that dreamed of a better future without noticing the present. The leading German newspaper Sueddeutsche Zeitung calls it a book "that sometimes lets you roar with laughter and sometimes makes you sad." Der Spiegel wrote: ″In a funny book, the former communist describes what incentives East Germany offered a young West German.″

Since the summer of 2004 Adrian Geiges has been the Beijing Correspondent of the leading German weekly news magazine Stern. Before that he founded the Chinese enterprise of G+J, the Bertelsmann corporation’s magazine division. In the 1990s he had worked as a television reporter for Spiegel TV and RTL in Moscow and New York. He has studied Chinese and Russian.

In early 2013 he moved to Rio de Janeiro (Brazil) and worked there as a documentary filmmaker. He lived in a favela and wrote about his experiences in his book "Brazil is Burning".

Together with Stefan Aust, the longtime editor-in-chief of the German weekly news magazine Der Spiegel, Geiges wrote the biography ″Xi Jinping: The Most Powerful Man in the World″, which reached the top 20 of the German bestseller list. It has been published in several languages, including in English (2022). Jonathan Watts, former East Asia correspondent for The Guardian and president of the Foreign Correspondents' Club of China, called this book ″a useful primer on a figure who will shape all our futures″. The Chinese artist Ai Weiwei wrote: ″This book about Xi Jinping is an original account of the current political condition in China and the trajectory of this political figure of our time. Enriched by authentic details, it tells an untellable story that is grand in scope.″(back panel).

== Works ==
- Front Against Freedom. Beijing, Moscow and Their Accomplices All Over the World, Piper 2024
- How I Moved Around The World and Always Found a New Live, Piper 2023
- Xi Jinping: The Most Powerful Man in the World, with Stefan Aust, Polity 2022
- Brazil is Burning, Quadriga 2014
- With Confucius to World Power, with Stefan Aust, Quadriga 2012
- Manual for Beijing and Shanghai, Piper 2009
- 我的愤青岁月, New Star Press 2009 (Chinese edition of “How the World Revolution Once Accidentally Started in the Black Forest“)
- How the World Revolution Once Accidentally Started in the Black Forest, Eichborn 2007
- Russia Explosive, with Andre Zalbertus, vgs 1994
- Love is Not on the State Plan, with Tatjana Suworowa, JICC 1992 (Japanese edition)
- Love is Not on the State Plan, with Tatjana Suworowa, Sobesednik 1990 (Russian edition)
- Revolution Without Shooting, Iletisim Yayinlari, 1990 (Turkish edition)
- Love is Not on the State Plan, with Tatjana Suworowa, Wolfgang Krüger/ S.Fischer 1989
- Revolution Without Shooting, Pahl-Rugenstein 1988
- Awakening China, Pahl-Rugenstein 1987
