= Adrián Mouriño =

Spanish footballer

Personal information
- Full name: Adrián Mouriño Fernández
- Date of birth: 1 February 1988 (age 38)
- Place of birth: O Porriño, Spain
- Height: 1.68 m (5 ft 6 in)
- Position: Midfielder

Youth career
- Celta

Senior career*
Years	Team	Apps	(Gls)
2007–2009	Celta B	61	(2)
2009–2010	Coruxo	31	(4)
2010–2011	Montañeros	7	(0)
2011–2012	Ourense	37	(6)
2012–2013	Recreativo B	29	(6)
2012–2013	Recreativo	2	(0)
2013–2014	Sant Andreu	28	(2)
2014–2019	Pontevedra	134	(15)
2019–2020	Rápido Bouzas	35	(7)
2020–2021	Atios	28	(0)
2021–2022	Verín	32	(6)
- * Club domestic league appearances and goals as of 07:52, 10 November 2022 (UTC)

Adrián Mouriño Fernández (born 1 February 1988) is a Spanish professional footballer who plays as a midfielder.

== Club career ==
Mouriño was born in O Porriño, Province of Pontevedra. A product of RC Celta de Vigo's youth system, he played two full seasons with the B team in the Segunda División B, subsequently moving to amateur football with neighbouring Coruxo FC.

Mouriño returned to the third division for the 2010–11 campaign, joining Montañeros CF. He featured rarely over the course of his only season, returning to Tercera División after signing with CD Ourense.

On 10 July 2012, Mouriño joined Segunda División club Recreativo de Huelva. He made his debut as a professional on 26 October, playing 80 minutes as a substitute in a 3–2 away win against FC Barcelona B.

On 4 September 2013, Mouriño signed with third-tier UE Sant Andreu. He returned to his native Galicia the following year, agreeing to a two-year contract at Pontevedra CF in the same league.
