= Hadrianus =

Hadrianus may refer to:

== People ==
- Hadrian (76–138), Roman emperor
- Gaius Fabius Hadrianus, Roman colonial administrator & politician
- Pope Adrian (disambiguation) (any of the listed popes)
- Hadrianus Junius (1511–1575), also known as Adriaen de Jonghe

== Other ==
- 7446 Hadrianus, an asteroid
- Hadrianus (turtle), an extinct genus of tortoise
- The origin of the Emperor family, Hadria Picena or Hatria the modern Atri in Abruzzo region, Italy
