= Hadria =

Hadria may refer to:

- Hadria, an alternative spelling for the Etruscan city that is now Adria in the Veneto region of Northern Italy.
- Hadria, an alternative spelling for the city that is now Atri in the Abruzzo region of Central Italy.
- Hadria (leafhopper), a genus of insects in the tribe Cicadellini
