= Adrian Bailey (academic) =

British geographer

Adrian J. Bailey is a scholar known for his research in population, migration, economic, and social geography. He is currently chair professor of geography and Dean of Social Sciences at Hong Kong Baptist University. His research interests include the study of transnationalism, with his work in this area exploring the diverse ways in which the state affects life outcomes among immigrants and refugees.

Bailey holds a PhD from Indiana University in geography with a minor in African population studies. He has previously worked at the University of Leeds and Dartmouth College.

== Honours ==
In 2013, the Academy of Social Sciences bestowed the status of Academician on Bailey, in recognition of the impact of his work on the social sciences. This title was later changed to Fellow by the academy.

In 1989, Bailey received the Lieber Memorial Teaching Associate Award from Indiana University, which was established to recognise outstanding teachers among the university's graduate students.

== Works ==
=== Books ===
- Bailey, A. J. (2005). Making population geography. London: Oxford University Press. Summarizes the inception, evolution and possible futures of the field of population geography.

=== Selected articles ===
- Bailey, A. J. (2013). Migration, recession and an emerging transnational biopolitics across Europe. Geoforum, 44, 202–210. doi:10.1016/j.geoforum.2012.09.006
- Bailey, A. J. (2009). Population geography: Lifecourse matters. Progress in Human Geography, 33(3), 407–418. doi:10.1177/0309132508096355
- Bailey, A. J., Wright, R. A., Mountz, A. & Miyares, I. M. (2002). (Re)producing Salvadoran Transnational Geographies. Annals of the Association of American Geographers, 92(1), 125–144. doi:10.1111/1467-8306.00283

=== Editorships ===
- Transactions of the Institute of British Geographers. Term began 1 January 2016.
