= Adrian Stroe =

Paroled Romanian serial killer

- Born: 24 October 1959 (age 66); Bucharest, Romania
- Other name: "The Taxi Driver of Death"
- Convictions: Murder x3 Drug trafficking x1
- Penalty: Life imprisonment (murders); 15 years (drug trafficking)

Details
- Victims: 3
- Span of crimes: January – September 1992
- Country: Romania
- State: Bucharest
- Date apprehended: 17 September 1992

Adrian Stroe (born 24 October 1959), known as The Taxi Driver of Death, is a Romanian serial killer responsible for the murders of three women in the vicinity of Bucharest, committed between January and September 1992. Sentenced to life imprisonment for these murders in 1996, he was paroled in 2018.

== Early life ==
Adrian Stroe was born on 24 October 1959, in Bucharest. Little is known about his early life, but he would later claim that he grew up without feeling any love towards his mother. He studied as an engineer at the Faculty of Civil Engineering, from where he successfully graduated, but instead opted to work as a taxi driver, because he claimed that he'd "earn in one evening as [he] would earn after a month in the construction site". At the age of 22, he married a local woman and had a daughter.

In 1991, the couple divorced. Stroe started to feel embittered by the separation, as he still loved his wife, and eventually turned his anger towards his female passengers.

== Murders ==
In the evening of 29 January 1992, Stroe picked up 26-year-old Lavinia Stoian, and drove her to Lake Cernica. When they got to the destination, he asked her if she would like to have sex with him, which she refused. Annoyed by her refusal, Stroe strangled her to death. After picking off all her jewellery and undressing her body, he threw it into the lake and promptly left.

On 29 March, he was driving down a street in Bucharest, when he picked up 25-year-old Russian tourist Elvira Vasilieva in front of a hotel. Stroe drove to Lake Cernica again, where he attempted to kiss the woman in a state of arousal. Vasilieva rebuffed his advances, and in a blind rage, Stroe strangled her. He then undressed her body, leaving only her blouse on, and threw it into the lake.

On 9 September, Stroe picked up his final victim, 25-year-old Mariana Baltac, a saleswoman working at the Unirea store. With this victim, Stroe claimed that he had attempted to befriend first, with the pair going to two restaurants and him buying her expensive perfume and shoes. When they reached Lake Cernica, he attempted to court her, but Baltac refused his advances. Enraged by her refusal, Stroe raped and then strangled Baltac. He then got the body out of his car, doused it in gasoline and lit it on fire. After letting the fire disfigure her body for some time, he put it in the taxi's trunk and drove to nearby Glina, where he discarded it in a ditch.

== Discovery, arrest and trial ==
Between March and April, the decomposing bodies of two women were found within two weeks of each other in Lake Pantelimon. Authorities were able to identify both victims as Stoian and Vasilieva, but were unable to determine whether the case was related. This suspicion was confirmed when the badly burned body of another woman was found near Glina. Despite most of her body being burned up, some of her fingers had miraculously avoided any damage, and thus she was identified via fingerprints as Mariana Baltac.

Sensing that the killer might've had a more personal connection to this victim than the previous two, investigators started reconstructing the girl's final day by interviewing friends and acquaintances, among whom was Adrian Stroe. While he was being interviewed in his apartment on 17 September, he denied any involvement, but this came into question when the woman's brand new shoes were found hidden behind the toilet bowl. Stroe was brought to the police station, whereupon he confessed to the three murders, claiming that he had killed the women because he was angry that they rejected his advances. He was transferred to the Jilava Penitentiary Hospital for a psychiatric examination, where he was diagnosed with a psychopathic disorder.

He was brought to trial, where he readily admitted that he was responsible and would wish for appropriate punishment, but claimed that he "only regretted the acts, not the victims". After a lengthy trial lasting four years, he was sentenced to life imprisonment.

== Imprisonment and release ==
Shortly after his conviction, Stroe became a media sensation, and was often sought after for interviews. Within the first three years of his detention, he openly professed that he felt no remorse, and the only things he missed were his wife, daughter and their German shepherd. In 1999, he was transferred to Rahova Penitentiary, where he began reading the Bible and turned towards Adventism, claiming to have repented for his crimes.

Over the following years of his imprisonment, Stroe became an active member of Rahova Penitentiary's religious community, and in 2007, he became the leader of the Community of Christian Prisoners in Romania. During his time in prison, he wrote three books focusing on religious scripture and the influence of Latin in the Romanian language, and by the end of 2007, he also married an English teacher from Târgoviște. In 2012, however, he was found guilty of trafficking heroin and given an additional 15-year sentence, which was merged with his life sentence.

In June 2018, the Găești District Court ordered that Stroe be paroled, as a review of his activities during his imprisonment, which included participating in 16 prisoner programs for recreational and work activities, made him eligible for release. He was subsequently released, with this controversial decision causing a debate on whether lifers with violent criminal records be released back into public life.

== See also ==
- List of serial killers by country
