= Adrian A. Husain =

Pakistani poet

Adrian A. Husain (born Syed Akbar Husain) is a Pakistani poet, Shakespearean scholar, and literary journalist.

He was the founding Chairman of the civil rights think tank Dialogue: Pakistan prior to the return of democracy in 2008.

Educated in England, Italy, and Switzerland, Husain received his undergraduate Bachelor of Arts (Hons.) degree in English Literature from the University of Oxford in 1963.

He won the Guinness Poetry Prize for his poem, House at Sea in 1968. His collection of verse, Desert Album, was published by Oxford University Press in 1997 to.coincide with Pakistan's Golden Jubilee.

He has since published two collections of sonnets, Italian Window and Knife of the Tide. After securing a doctorate on Shakespeare, Machiavelli and Castiglione from the University of East Anglia in 1993, he authored his critically acclaimed study, Politics and Genre in Hamlet, Oxford University Press.

He has also recently published a novel, 'The Dreamwork of Lisa D‘. A piece of literary fiction, it was launched at the Karachi Literature Festival.in February, 2026.

== Work ==
He is the author of Politics and Genre in Hamlet, published by Oxford University Press in 2004. His collection of verse, Desert Album, was published by Oxford University Press in 1997 to coincide with Pakistan's Golden Jubilee. He also published a collection of sonnets, Italian Window, in 2017.

A recent publication, The Changing World of Contemporary South Asian Poetry in English: A Collection of Critical Essays, edited by Mitali P. Wong and M. Yousuf Saeed, contains an essay on Husain's verse. He wrote Elegy for Benazir Bhutto in 2011. According to Harris Khalique in Dawn, Husain has stated his aspiration to write verse that transcends time and space, rather than specifically Pakistani ethnic poetry. Khalique also notes that Husain's poetry frequently explores the interactions and contradictions between individualism and collectivism through the lens of human suffering.
