= Adrián Hernández =

Adrián Hernández may refer to:

- Adrián Hernández (baseball, born 1975), former professional baseball pitcher
- Adrián Hernández (baseball, born 2000), Mexican professional baseball pitcher
- Adrián Hernández (boxer) (born 1988), Mexican boxer
- Adrián Hernández (football manager) (born 1981), Spanish football manager
- Pollo (footballer) (Adrián José Hernández, born 1983), Spanish footballer

== See also ==
- Adriano Hernandez (1870–1925), Filipino revolutionary
