= Adrian Smith (illustrator) =

British illustrator

- Area: Artist

Adrian Smith is a British illustrator, best known for his numerous illustrations for Games Workshop's games. Adrian and Ian Miller are especially well known for their work in the early days of Warhammer and 40k in creating a dark and serious atmospheric setting.

He has also worked in comics producing a number of covers for Toxic! and is working on the French graphic novel series Broz with Pat Mills.

Smith has illustrated cards for the Magic: The Gathering collectible card game.

== Bibliography ==
- The Art of Adrian Smith (Black Library, August 2003, ISBN 1-84416-062-9)
- Broz (with Pat Mills):
  - "L'arme soeur" (2005, ISBN 2-914420-10-2)
  - "Recherché... Mort ou vif!" (December 2005, ISBN 2-914420-13-7)
- Chronicles Of HATE:
  - Volume One (2014, ISBN 9781632152091)
  - Volume Two (2016, ISBN 9781534300866)
  - Volume Three (2023)
