= Adrian Steirn =

Photographer and filmmaker

Adrian Steirn is a photographer and filmmaker. He is the founder of Ginkgo Agency, which specialises in creating strategic, high-quality short-form content. Steirn is also the creator of Beautiful News and 21 Icons.

== Books ==
- 21 Icons ‘Together We Are Better’

== Television series ==
- 21 Icons Season I ‘Journey to Democracy’
- 21 Icons Season II ‘Promise of Freedom’
- 21 Icons Season III ‘Future of a Nation’

== Documentaries ==
- 21 Icons Season I ‘Journey to Democracy’
- 21 Icons Season II ‘The Promise of Freedom’
- Lily Cole's Amazon Adventure
- The World's Most Wanted Leopard

== Exhibitions ==
- This Wild Afrique
- 21 Icons Portrait of a Nation
