= Pope Adrian =

Pope Adrian or Pope Hadrian may refer to:

- Pope Adrian I (772–795)
- Pope Adrian II (867–872)
- Pope Adrian III (saint; 884–885)
- Pope Adrian IV (1154–1159)
- Pope Adrian V (1276)
- Pope Adrian VI (1522–1523)

Fiction:

- Hadrian the Seventh, novel and play featuring a fictional English Pope Hadrian VII

Music:

- Pope Adrian 37th Psychristiatric, concept album by Rudimentary Peni
