= Adrian Ávalos =

Argentine footballer

Personal information
- Full name: Adrian Rodrigo Ávalos
- Date of birth: 25 November 1974 (age 51)
- Place of birth: Córdoba, Argentina
- Position: Midfielder

Team information
- Current team: Deportivo Maipú

Senior career*
Years	Team	Apps	(Gls)
1992–1995	Talleres		
1995–1999	Belgrano		
1999–2002	Talleres		
2002	Huracán	11	(0)
2003	Manta	15	(0)
2003–2005	Belgrano		
2005–2006	Independiente Rivadavia		
2006	Tucumán		
2007	General Paz Juniors		
2007–2008	Racing de Córdoba		
2009–	Deportivo Maipú		
- * Club domestic league appearances and goals as of 16:42, 14 March 2009 (UTC)

Adrian Rodrigo Ávalos (born 25 November 1974 in Córdoba) is an Argentine footballer who plays for Deportivo Maipú.

== Club career ==
Ávalos previously played for Talleres de Córdoba, Belgrano and Huracán in the Primera División Argentina. He also had a brief spell with Manta in Ecuador.
