= Adrian Becher =

English cricketer (1897–1957)

Personal information
- Full name: Adrian William Bay Becher
- Born: 17 May 1897; Bourton-on-the-Water, Gloucestershire, England
- Died: 29 March 1957 (aged 59); Cheltenham, Gloucestershire, England
- Batting: Right-handed

Domestic team information
- Years: Team
- 1924/25–1925/26: Europeans
- 1925–1929: Gloucestershire

Career statistics
Competition	First-class
Matches	12
Runs scored	327
Batting average	15.57
100s/50s	–/1
Top score	64
Balls bowled	186
Wickets	0
Bowling average	–
5 wickets in innings	–
10 wickets in match	–
Best bowling	–
Catches/stumpings	18/–
- Source: ESPNcricinfo, 27 July 2022

Brigadier Adrian William Bay Becher OBE MC* (17 May 1897 – 29 March 1957) was a British Army officer and first-class cricketer. Born in Gloucestershire he was educated at Repton School before entering the Royal Military College, Sandhurst. Becher was commissioned into the King's Own Yorkshire Light Infantry (KOYLI) in the early months of the First World War. After serving as an aide-de-camp he was promoted to the acting rank of captain and command of a company. He received the Military Cross on 16 August 1917 for his actions in leading his company in an assault on an enemy position. He received a bar to this medal on 19 November 1917 for holding a position with his company whilst a new trenchline was dug. In 1918 Becher served briefly as an observer officer with the newly founded Royal Air Force.

After the war Becher served as adjutant with a KOYLI's Territorial Army battalion and as instructor with the Small Arms School Corps. During the Second World War Becher commanded the 2nd battalion of the KOYLI in the defence of Burma. He was appointed an Officer of the Order of the British Empire on 23 March 1944 for his service in the Sicily Campaign and promoted to the temporary rank of brigadier. He was twice mentioned in despatches in 1945 for service in the North West Europe Campaign. Becher was also a commander of the Belgian Order of Leopold II and was awarded that nation's Croix de Guerre 1940 with palm. He retired from the army in 1948.

Becher was a keen cricketer playing for his school team and for the Europeans cricket team in the Lahore Tournament whilst on service in British India. When in England he played for Gloucestershire in the County Championship. Becher played twelve first-class matches.

== Early life and cricket ==
The son of Charles Adrian Gough Becher, he was born in Gloucestershire at Bourton-on-the-Water on 17 May 1897. Becher was educated at Repton School, where he played for the school cricket team.

While serving in the military in British India, Becher made his debut in first-class cricket when he was selected to play for the Europeans cricket team against the Muslims in the 1924–25 Lahore Tournament. Shortly after he returned to England, where he made his debut for Gloucestershire at Lord's against Middlesex in the 1925 County Championship. Becher played for Gloucestershire during the remainder of the 1925 season, making seven first-class appearances. During the English winter, he returned to India where he made two further first-class appearances for the Europeans in the 1925–26 Lahore Tournament. He later made two first-class appearances for Gloucestershire, playing against Leicestershire in the 1926 County Championship and Worcestershire in the 1929 County Championship. In twelve first-class matches, Becher scored 327 runs at an average of 15.57; he made one half century, a score of 64 for Gloucestershire against Somerset in 1925.

== Military career ==
=== First World War ===
Becher attended the Royal Military College, Sandhurst, as a gentleman cadet and on 11 November 1914 was commissioned as a second lieutenant into the King's Own Yorkshire Light Infantry (KOYLI). He was promoted to lieutenant on 14 April 1915, though this promotion was later antedated to 6 February. Becher served as an aide-de-camp until 9 April 1916. He was appointed to the acting rank of captain on 8 February 1917, whilst he held command of a company. During this time he led his company in an assault on enemy positions and was noted for keeping up their morale during three days of heavy shellfire. He was awarded the Military Cross for this action on 16 August 1917.

Becher received a temporary commission in the rank of captain on 11 March and a regular commission on 4 May. He was awarded a bar to the Military Cross on 19 November 1917 for his actions holding a position under heavy shellfire for five days. Becher had been buried by a shell explosion on the first day but recovered and maintained order in his company, allowing a new trenchline to be dug to consolidate the defences.

Becher joined the newly established Royal Air Force (RAF) on 1 August 1918 as an observer officer. He held the RAF ranks of temporary second lieutenant and honorary captain, though he retained his captain's commission in the KOYLI. Becher returned to his regiment on 20 March 1919.

=== Inter-war period ===
Becher became adjutant of the KOYLI's 4th (Territorial Army) battalion on 20 April 1926. He returned to the regular army on 20 April 1929. Becher was promoted to major on 15 January 1932. He was appointed an instructor at the Netheravon wing of the Small Arms School Corps on 4 April 1935 and held this position until 4 April 1938. Becher was promoted to lieutenant-colonel on 24 April 1939.

=== Second World War ===
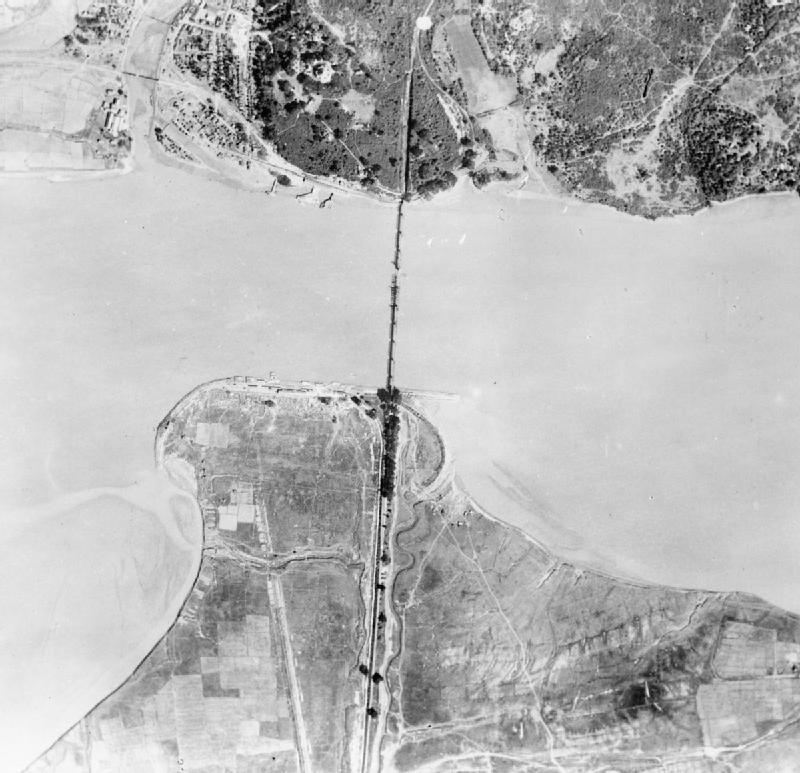
Sittang Bridge, where Becher fought at the Battle of Sittang Bridge in 1942

In February 1942 Becher was leading the KOYLI's 2nd battalion in Burma and fought during the Battle of Sittang Bridge, the unsuccessful defence of the Sittang River against the assaulting Japanese. He was appointed to the temporary rank of colonel on 23 March 1942. Becher completed his three-year period in command of his battalion on 24 April but was retained with the regiment in a supernumerary capacity.

Becher was appointed an Officer of the Order of the British Empire on 23 March 1944 for his service in the Sicily Campaign, in which the 1st battalion of the KOYLI served, and on 6 April was promoted to the temporary rank of brigadier. On 22 March 1945 he was mentioned in despatches for his service in the North West Europe campaign. He received a second mention in despatches on 20 May 1945. Becher was appointed a commander of the Order of Leopold II with palm and also received the Croix de Guerre 1940 with palm, receiving permission to wear the insignia of both on his uniform on 25 September 1947.

== Later life ==
Becher retired on 21 March 1948 as a lieutenant-colonel in the KOYLI. He was granted the honorary rank of brigadier. Becher died at Cheltenham, Gloucestershire, on 29 March 1957.
