= Adrián El Charani =

Venezuelan footballer (born 2000)

Personal information
- Full name: Adrián Amir El Charani Trujillo
- Date of birth: 24 October 2000 (age 26)
- Place of birth: Venezuela
- Position: Forward

Team information
- Current team: Atlético Venezuela

Youth career
- –2019: Carabobo
- 2019: Granada

Senior career*
Years	Team	Apps	(Gls)
2017–2019	Carabobo	1	(0)
2019–2020	Huétor Vega	8	(0)
2020–	Atlético Venezuela		

International career
2014	Venezuela U15		
2016	Venezuela U17		
2018	Venezuela U18		
- * Club domestic league appearances and goals as of 23:40, 1 January 2021 (UTC)

Adrián Amir El Charani Trujillo (born 24 October 2000) is a Venezuelan footballer who plays as a forward for Atlético Venezuela.

== Club career ==
El Charani made his debut for Carabobo on 14 April 2017, coming on as a substitute for Tommy Tobar in a 5–1 defeat to Zulia.

In February 2020, El Charani returned to Venezuela and joined Atlético Venezuela.

== International career ==
El Charani was called up to the Venezuela under 17 side in late 2016 and played against the under 20 side.

== Career statistics ==
=== Club ===
As of 20 October 2019.

Club	Season	League			Cup		Continental		Other		Total	
Club	Season	Division	Apps	Goals	Apps	Goals	Apps	Goals	Apps	Goals	Apps	Goals
Carabobo	2017	Venezuelan Primera División	1	0	0	0	0	0	0	0	1	0
Carabobo	2018	Venezuelan Primera División	0	0	0	0	0	0	0	0	0	0
Carabobo	Total		1	0	0	0	0	0	0	0	1	0
Huétor Vega	2019–20	Tercera División	4	0	0	0	–		0	0	4	0
Career total			5	0	0	0	0	0	0	0	5	0
