= Adrian Schlagbauer =

German footballer

Personal information
- Date of birth: 9 July 2002 (age 24)
- Place of birth: Germany
- Position: Midfielder

Team information
- Current team: Würzburger Kickers
- Number: 13

Youth career
- –2021: Würzburger Kickers

Senior career*
Years	Team	Apps	(Gls)
2021–2022	Würzburger Kickers	1	(0)
- * Club domestic league appearances and goals as of 04:17, 24 May 2021 (UTC)

Adrian Schlagbauer (born 9 July 2002) is a German footballer who plays as a midfielder.

== Career ==
Schlagbauer made his professional debut for Würzburger Kickers in the 2. Bundesliga on 23 May 2021, coming on as a substitute in the 89th minute for Marvin Pieringer. The home match finished as a 1–1 draw.

== Personal life ==
Schlagbauer is the son of Dr. Michael Schlagbauer, an honorary president of Würzburger Kickers who served as the club's president and executive board chairman for 16 years.
