= Adriane =

The name Adriane may refer to:

- Adriane Carr (born 1952), Canadian academic, activist, and politician
- Adriane dos Santos (born 1988), Brazilian association football player
- Adriane Fugh-Berman, American medical researcher
- Adriane Galisteu (born 1973), Brazilian model, actress, and TV Host
- Adriane Garcia (born 1983), TV show presenter, actress and former pop singer-songwriter now living in Portugal
- Adriane Johnson, American politician
- Adriane Lenox (born 1956), American stage and film actress
- Adriane Lopes (born 1976), Brazilian politician
- Adriane Rini, New Zealand philosopher

== See also ==
- ADRIANE, acronym of Audio Desktop Reference Implementation and Networking Environment, a variety of the Knoppix Linux distribution
- Ariadne (disambiguation)
