= Adrian Cuciula =

Romanian footballer

Personal information
- Date of birth: 9 May 1986 (age 40)
- Place of birth: Hunedoara, Romania
- Height: 1.86 m (6 ft 1 in)
- Position: Centre back

Team information
- Current team: FC Hunedoara

Senior career*
Years	Team	Apps	(Gls)
2006–2008	Liberty Salonta	38	(4)
2008–2009	Piacenza Calcio	5	(0)
2009–2010	Liberty Salonta	30	(4)
2010	Poli Iaşi	2	(0)
2011	Petrolul Ploieşti	4	(0)
2011–	FC Hunedoara	0	(0)
- * Club domestic league appearances and goals as of 21 March 2010 ‡ National team caps and goals as of 25 November 2009

Adrian Cuciula (born 9 May 1986) is a Romanian football player, currently under contract at Poli Iaşi.

== Career ==
Born in Hunedoara, Cuciula began playing football as a defender in the youth sides of Liberty Salonta. He would make more than 50 appearances for the club, and had a brief spell in Italy's Serie B with Piacenza Calcio, before joining Liga I side FC Politehnica Iași.
