= Hadrien =

Hadrien is a French masculine given name.

== List of people with the name ==
- Hadrien Clouet (born 1991), French politician
- Hadrien David (born 2004), French racing driver
- Hadrien de Montferrand (born 1976), French art historian
- Hadrien Federiconi (born 1987), French DJ
- Hadrien Feraud (born 1984), French jazz bassist
- Hadrien Ghomi (born 1989), French politician
- Hadrien Laroche (born 1963), French writer
- Hugo Hadrien Dominique Lloris (born 1986), French professional footballer
- Hadrien Salvan (born 1997), French swimmer

== See also ==
- Hadrian
- Adrian
