= Adrián Fernández Cabrera =

Mexican politician

- Born: 28 October 1967 (age 58); Mexico City, Mexico
- Occupation: Politician
- Political party: PAN

Adrián Fernández Cabrera (born 28 October 1967) is a Mexican politician from the National Action Party. From 2006 to 2009 he served as Deputy of the LX Legislature of the Mexican Congress representing the Federal District.
