= Adrian Pelka =

German footballer

Personal information
- Date of birth: 22 June 1981 (age 45)
- Place of birth: Germany
- Height: 1.85 m (6 ft 1 in)
- Position: Midfielder

Senior career*
Years	Team	Apps	(Gls)
2001	FC Rastatt 04		
2001–2003	Hamburger SV II	3+	(0+)
2003–2004	1. FC Pforzheim		
2004–2005	FC Nöttingen	31	(1)
2005	RoPS	2	(0)
2007–2008	1. FC Heidenheim		
- SpVgg Durlach-Aue
- * Club domestic league appearances and goals

Adrian Pelka (born 22 June 1981) is a German former professional footballer who played as a midfielder.

== Career ==
=== RoPS ===
Receiving his license to take part in competitions with RoPS near the end of August 2005, Pelka was seen as one of their most important members after they hosted KuPS, operating at defensive midfielder. However, the middleman ostensibly let the opposition dispossess him and have a penalty in a 5–1 defeat by MyPa, leading to suspicion of match manipulation three years later especially since Malaysian William Bee Wah Lim was discovered to have bet on a defeat by four-goals in favor of MyPa. At the time, the club officials did not suspect him but severely criticized him for the errors.

In total, he made two Veikkausliiga appearances during the 2005 season.
