= Adrián Steckel =

Mexican businessman

- Occupation: CEO of OneWeb

Adrián Steckel is a Mexican businessman, and was CEO of global internet satellite company, OneWeb.

== Career ==
Mr. Steckel worked five years at TV Azteca where he was involved in programming production and managing the musical division of the company. He was Chief Financial Officer for three years and took the company public on the New York Stock Exchange. Mr. Steckel then moved on to become Chief Executive Officer of Unefón in 2000, a company that he built from scratch, garnering 1.4 million subscribers, and more than US$100 million in EBITDA annually.

In 2005, TV Azteca (one of the two largest producers of Spanish-language television programming in the world) named Mr. Steckel as president and CEO of Azteca America, the company's wholly owned broadcasting network focused on the U.S. Hispanic market.

Mr. Steckel was the CEO of Iusacell, a mobile carrier company in Mexico, which he eventually sold to AT&T in 2015.

Steckel previously served as the CEO of OneWeb, a global satellite-based communications company.
