= Adrian Bellamy =

British businessman (born 1941/1942)

- Born: Adrian D. P. Bellamy; 1941 or 1942 (age 84–85); Derbyshire, England
- Education: University of South Africa
- Occupation: Businessman
- Title: Chairman, Reckitt Benckiser
- Term: May 2003 - May 2018
- Successor: Christopher A. Sinclair
- Children: 4

Adrian D. P. Bellamy (born 1941/1942) is a British businessman. He was the chairman of Reckitt Benckiser (LSE: RB) from 2003 to 2018.

== Early life ==
Adrian Bellamy was born in Derbyshire, England, and raised and educated in Southern Rhodesia (now Zimbabwe). He earned bachelor of commerce and MBA degrees from the University of South Africa.

== Career ==
He started his career in finance, and moved on to the retail industry in the 1960s. From 1995 to 2004, he served as chairman of the supervisory board of Gucci. From 2002 to 2008, he served as chairman of The Body Shop. He served as chairman of Reckitt Benckiser from 2003 to 2018. In September 2017, it was announced that Bellamy would stand down as chairman at 2018's AGM, and would be succeeded by Christopher A. Sinclair.

He formerly served on the board of directors of Starbucks (Nasdaq: SBUX). He sat on the board of directors of Gap Inc. (NYSE: GPS) from 1995, Williams-Sonoma, Inc. (NYSE: WSM) since 1997, the Robert Mondavi Corporation since 2002, the Labelux Group since 2009, and Total Wine & More.

== Personal life ==
Bellamy is married with four children. In 2003, he had homes in London's Belgravia and Carmel, California. He collects Californian landscape paintings and English Regency furniture.
