= Adrian Bartkowiak =

Polish footballer

Personal information
- Full name: Adrian Bartkowiak
- Date of birth: 28 January 1987 (age 39)
- Place of birth: Poznań, Poland
- Height: 1.82 m (5 ft 11 1/2 in)
- Position: Defender

Senior career*
Years	Team	Apps	(Gls)
- Lech Poznań
2004	Lech Poznań II		
2005–2008	Dyskobolia Grodzisk Wlkp.	2	(0)
2008–2009	Stal Stalowa Wola	21	(0)
2009	Warta Poznań	18	(0)
2010–2011	Górnik Łęczna	20	(0)
2011	→ Warta Poznań (loan)	8	(0)
2011–2014	Warta Poznań	50	(2)
2014–2015	Pelikan Niechanowo		
2016	Unia Swarzędz	1	(0)
2016–2018	Mieszko Gniezno		
- * Club domestic league appearances and goals

Adrian Bartkowiak (born 28 January 1987) is a Polish former professional footballer who played as a defender.

== Career ==
In January 2011, he was loaned to Warta Poznań on a half year deal. He returned to Górnik Łęczna half a year later.

== Honours ==
Dyskobolia Grodzisk Wlkp.

- Ekstraklasa Cup: 2006–07

Pelikan Niechanowo

- IV liga Greater Poland North: 2014–15

Mieszko Gniezno

- IV liga Greater Poland North: 2017–18
- Regional league Poznań East: 2016–17
