= Adrian Alejandro Wittwer =

Swiss athletics competitor

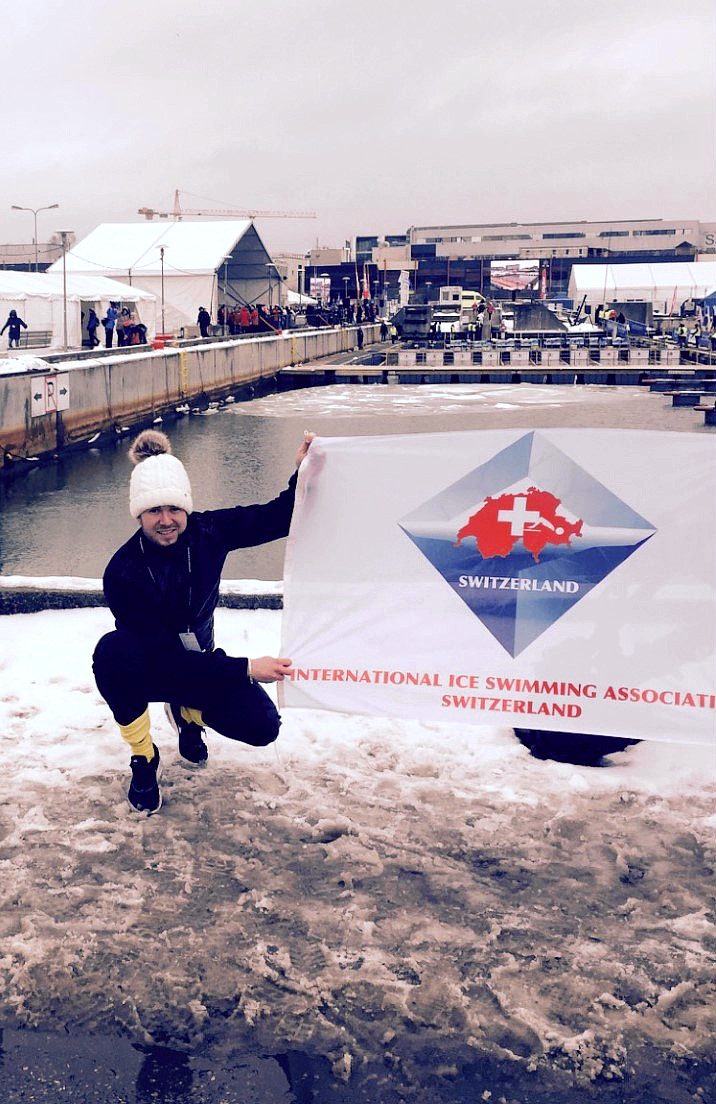

Personal information
- Nationality: Swiss
- Born: July 6, 1986 (age 40)

Sport
- Sport: Swimming

Adrian Alejandro Wittwer (born 1986) is a Swiss extreme athlete and ice swimmer.

== Life ==
Wittwer lives in Bolligen in the Canton of Bern. As an extreme athlete he participated in cross country running and marathons as well as extreme swimming. In 2012, Wittwer successfully transversally crossed Lake Constace. In 2013, he tried to cross the longitude of the lake from Bodman-Ludwigshafen to Bregenz, a distance no one ever completed. He had to abort after 27 of the 64 kilometres because of weather conditions.

Through other extreme swimmers Wittwer got into ice swimming and qualified for the Ice Swimming World Championship in 2017. He participated in the WC in 2018 in Tallinn and won 6th place in the 200m breaststroke competition. In the German Opens in 2018 he qualified for the WC in 2019.

In February 2019, Wittwer completed the Ice Mile Challenge, which means swimming a mile in water below 5 °C with only goggles, a swimming cap and swim trunks, in 3 °C cold water in 41 minutes and 46 seconds. He is the first Swiss man to complete this challenge. In March 2019 Wittwer won 2nd place in the WC for 50m breaststroke.

Wittwer works for the Swiss Military at the department for defence, public safety and sports. In 2017, Wittwer was part of a NATO mission to Kosovo for 6 months, as part of a peace supporting operation of Swisscoy, He is active for the Green Liberal Party of Switzerland and is part of the volunteer fire department.
