= Adrian Clark (boxing manager) =

American boxing manager

- Born: May 28, 1986; Dallas, Texas

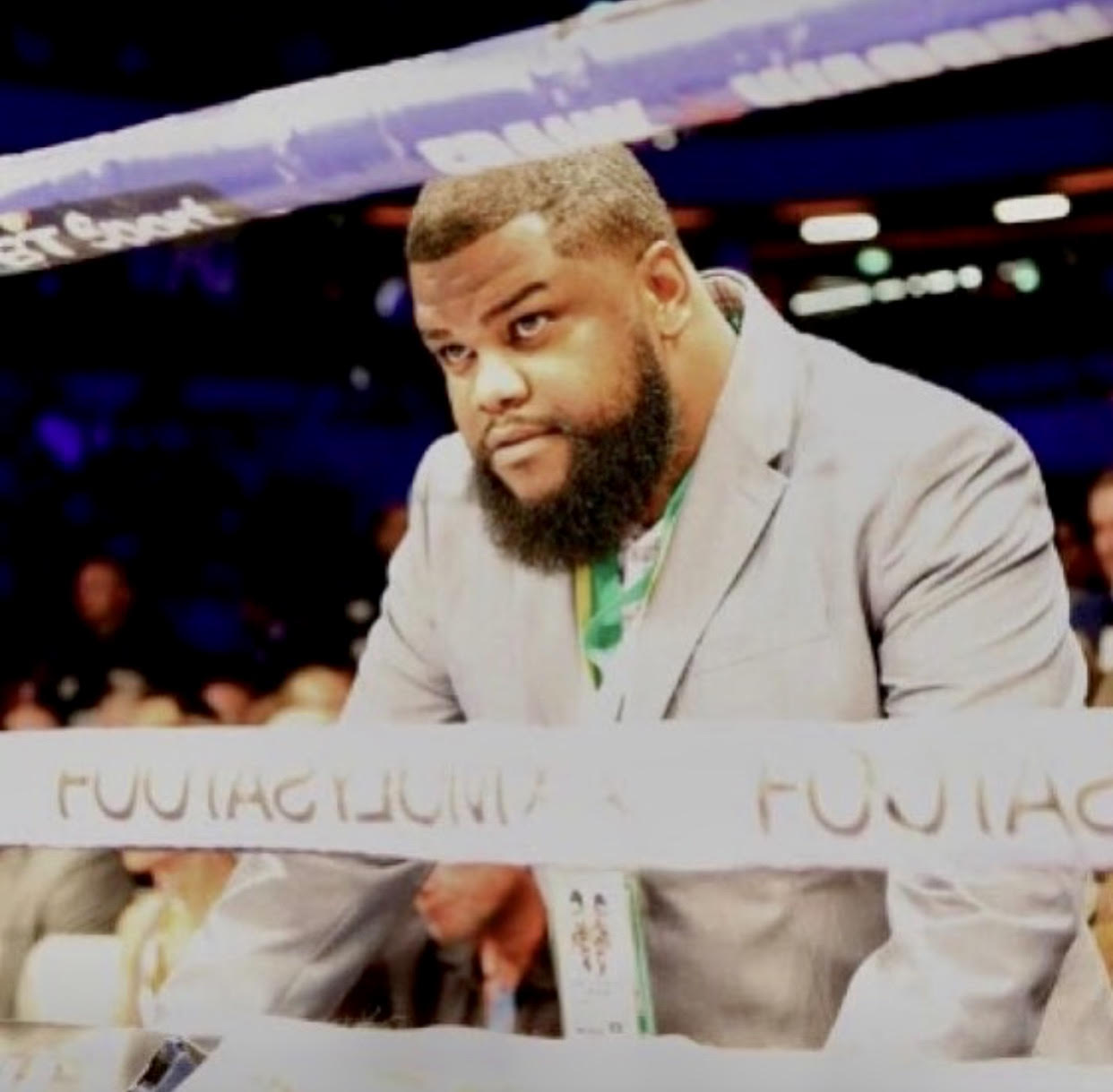

Adrian Clark (born May 28, 1986, Dallas, Texas) is an American boxing manager. He founded Protect Yourself at All Times to help educate professional boxers on the business of professional boxing. Clark managed various professional boxers, including Jerry Belmontes, James De La Rosa, Willie Monroe Jr., and Brian Norman Jr.. He was also an advisor to Jarrell Miller and unified welterweight champion Errol Spence Jr. In 2016 Forbes Magazine named Clark in its 30 Under 30 list.

Clark is currently the co-owner and CEO of Fighters First Management. He is also the Director and Executive Producer of the film, Protect Yourself at All Times:The Beginning.
