= Adrian Jevrić =

German footballer

Personal information
- Full name: Adrian Jevrić
- Date of birth: 7 July 1986 (age 40)
- Place of birth: Paderborn, West Germany
- Height: 1.85 m (6 ft 1 in)
- Position: Midfielder

Team information
- Current team: Suryoye Paderborn (player-manager)
- Number: 33

Youth career
- 1993–1997: TuS Sennelager
- 1997–2001: Hövelhofer SV
- 2001–2004: Paderborn 07

Senior career*
Years	Team	Apps	(Gls)
2004–2010	Paderborn 07 II		
2005–2011	SC Paderborn 07	2	(0)
2011–2017	Lippstadt 08	181	(59)
2017–2018	TuS Sennelager	23	(19)
2018–2020	SuS Bad Westernkotten	34	(7)
2020–	Suryoye Paderborn (player-manager)	9	(8)

Managerial career
- 2020–: Suryoye Paderborn
- * Club domestic league appearances and goals as of 17:24, 20 March 2021 (UTC)

Adrian Jevrić (born 7 July 1986 in Paderborn) is a German footballer who currently is a player-manager at Suryoye Paderborn.

== Career ==
Jevrić began his career with youth academies of TuS Sennelager, Hövelhofer SV, and SC Paderborn. In 2004, he promoted to SC Paderborn 07's reserve team. He made his debut on 24 April 2010 against MSV Duisburg. On 31 May 2010, he signed his first professional contract for SC Paderborn 07.

Jevrić joined SV Suryoye Paderborn in the beginning of 2020. He also became the club head coach from the summer 2020.
