= Adrianne =

Adrianne is a given name. It is the feminine form of the male name Adrian. Notable people named Adrianne include:

- Adrianne Allen (1907–1993), English stage actress
- Adrianne Baughns-Wallace (born 1944), American television journalist
- Adrianne Byrd (1970–2020), American author
- Adrianne Calvo (born 1984), American chef
- Adrianne Curry (born 1982), American model
- Adrianne Dunnett (born 1961), Canadian rhythmic gymnast
- Adrianne Frost (born 1978), American comedian, actress, and author
- Adrianne Gonzalez (born 1977), American songwriter, producer, composer, and mix engineer, known professionally as AG
- Adrianne Harun, American writer
- Adrianne Ho (born 1987) Canadian model, designer, and director
- Adrianne Lenker (born 1991), American folk singer/songwriter
- Adrianne León (born 1987), American singer and actress
- Adrianne Lobel, American stage designer and producer
- Adrianne Palicki (born 1983), American actress and model
- Adrianne Pieczonka (born 1963), Canadian opera singer
- Adrianne Todman (born 1970), American politician
- Adrianne Tolsch (1938–2016), American comedian
- Adrianne Wadewitz (1977–2014), American feminist scholar and Wikipedian
- Adrianne Wortzel (born 1941), American artist

== See also ==
- Adrienne
