= Richard Furch =

German music engineer, mixer, pianist, and composer

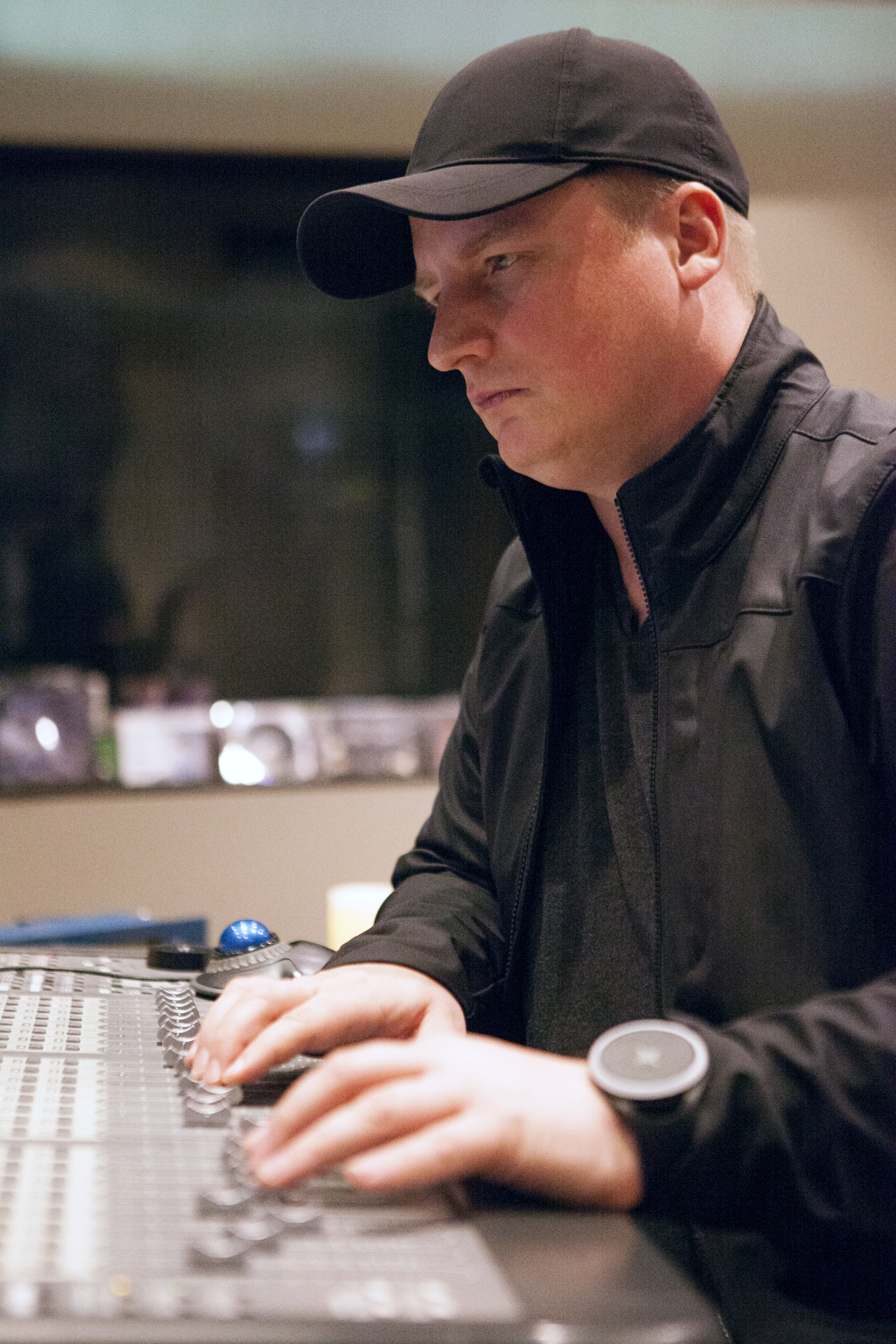
- Furch at Mix Haus Recording Studio 2019
- Born: Hamelin, Germany
- Education: Berklee College of Music
- Occupation: Mixing Engineer
- Musical career
- Genres: Pop; rock; R&B; hip hop; soul
- Instrument: Piano
- Years active: 2000–present
- Website: richardfurch.com

Richard Oliver Furch is an American music engineer, mixer, and pianist. He has worked with many prominent names in music, including: Usher, Prince, Boyz II Men, Macy Gray, Ruben Studdard, Chaka Khan, India.Arie, and Tyrese, as well as Chinese recording artists, JJ Lin, Tanya Chua, Wang Leehom, Jolin Tsai, and G.E.M. amongst many others.

He has engineered and mixed music on multiple Grammy Award nominated and Grammy Award winning albums.

Furch attended the SAE Institute in Berlin where he began studying music engineering and mixing. He attended Berklee College of Music and earned his bachelor's degree in music production and engineering. Rather than returning to Berlin, Furch moved to New York where he began engineering at Sound On Sound recording studio where he worked with such acts as Outkast, Jay-Z, Usher, Edwin McCain, and Fountains of Wayne Outkast won a Grammy Award for Album Of The Year for their album Speakerboxxx/The Love Below which Furch engineered parts of in 2003.

== Product endorsements ==
- Apogee
- McDSP
- Exponential Audio
- Metric Halo
- Arturia
- Sound radix

== Billboard music charts recognition ==
Furch received Billboard Award plaques in recognition for his work on mixing Prince's, LotusFlow3r Record, released in 2008, which peaked at #1 for top R&B/Hip-Hop albums on April 18, 2009.

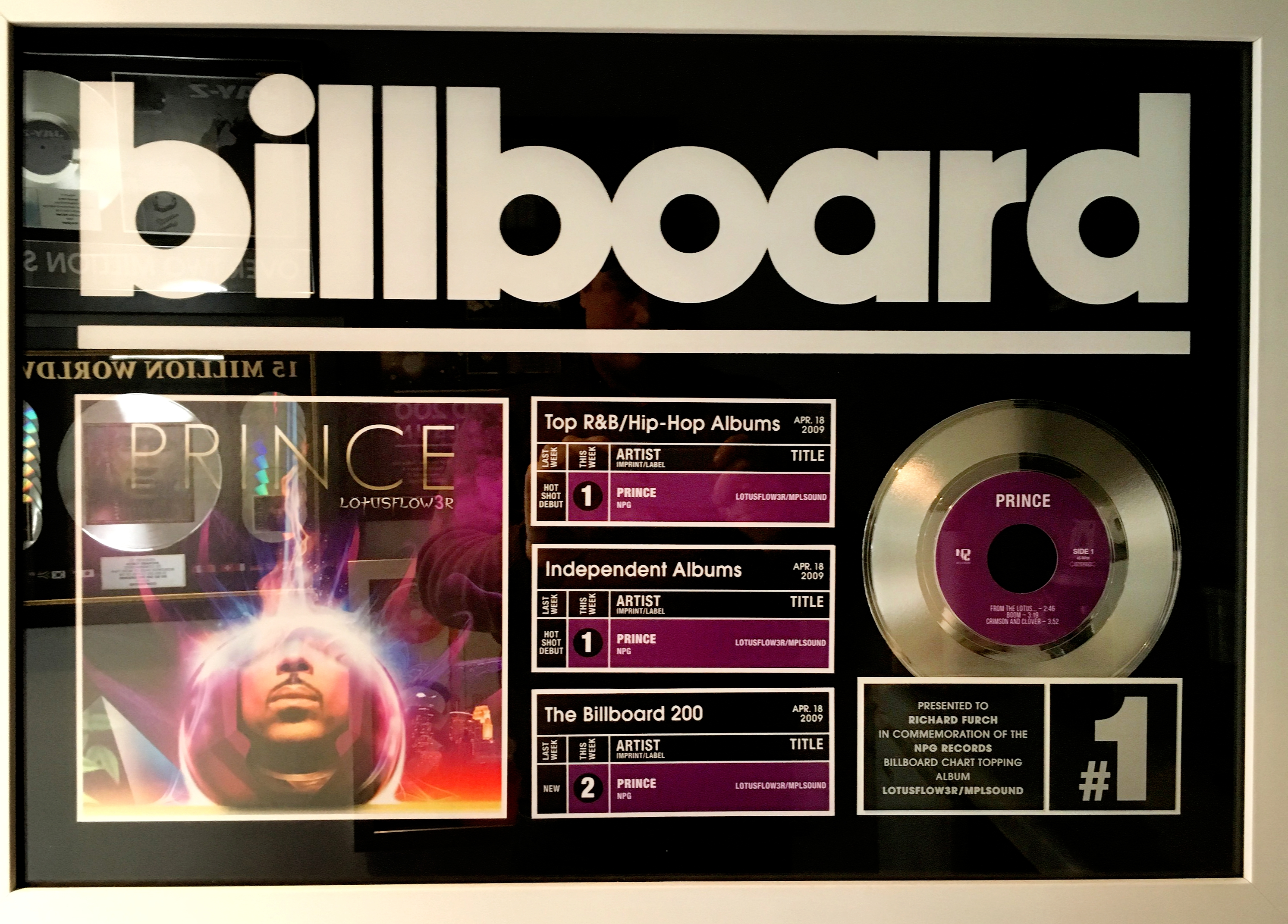
Prince LotusFlow3r #1 Billboard Richard Furch Recognition

== Albums mixed and engineered with Grammy Awards and nominations ==
Year	Nominee / work	Award	Result
2016	Tyrese "Shame"	Best Traditional R&B Performance	Nominated
2016	Tyrese "Shame"	Best R&B Song	Nominated
2016	Charlie Wilson "Forever Charlie"	Best R&B Album	Nominated
2014	TGT "Three Kings"	Best R&B Album	Nominated
2014	Chrisette Michele Better	Best R&B Album	Nominated
2013	Tyrese "Open Invitation"	Best R&B Album	Nominated
2009	Prince "Dreamer"	Best Solo Rock Vocal Performance	Nominated
2007	Chaka Khan "Funk This"	Best R&B Album	Won
2005	Usher "Confessions"	Best Contemporary R&B Album	Won
2005	The Brooklyn Tabernacle Choir "Live...This Is Your House"	Best Gospel Choir Or Chorus Album	Won
2005	Speakerboxxx "The Love Below"	Album Of The Year	Won
2003	Fountains Of Wayne Stacy's Mom	Best Pop Performance By A Duo Or Group With Vocal	Nominated
2001	The Brooklyn Tabernacle Choir "Light Of The World	Best Gospel Choir Or Chorus Album	Won
2001	Marcus Miller "M²"	Best Contemporary Jazz Album	Won

== Selected discography ==
Artist	Album	Label	Credit	
Hins Cheung	The Next 20 Hins Live in Hong Kong	EEG Music Hong Kong	Mixing	2022
Hins Cheung	The Brightest Darkness	EEG Music Hong Kong	Mixing	2021
Willodean	Awesome Life Decisions: Side One	Bigger Better More Records	Mixing	2017
Leela James	Did It For Love	BMG Records	Mixing	2017
Willodean	Fires Cars & Autumn Stars	Bigger Better More Records	Mixing	2017
Will Downing	Soul Survivor	Shanachie Records	Mixing	2017
Boyz II Men	Under The Streetlight	Masterworks Records	Mixing	2017
Kenny Lattimore	Vulnerable	Sincere Soul Records	Mixing	2017
Will Downing	Black Pearls	Shanachie Records	Mixing	2016
BJ The Chicago Kid	In My Mind	Motown Records	Mixing	2016
Livre'	Jericho: Tribe of Joshua	Relativity Records	Mixing	2016
Edwin McCain	Playlist: The Best Of Edwin McCain	Atlantic Records	Piano	2016
Tyrese	Black Rose	Voltron Recordz	Mixing/Engineering	2015
Will Downing	Chocolate Drops	Sophisticated Soul Records	Mixing	2015
Shaliek	Blood Sweat Tears	Pendulum Records	Mixing	2014
Boyz II Men	Collide	Absolute/Relativity Entertainment	Engineer, Mixing, Mixing Engineering	2014
Leela James	Fall For You	BMG	Mixing	2014
Kem	Promise To Love	Motown Records	Mixing	2014
K. Michelle	The Rebellious Soul Musical Soundtrack	Atlantic Records	Mixing	2014
Ledisi	The Truth	Verve Records	Mixing	2014
Tiesto	Club Life, Volume 3: Stockholm	Musical Freedom Records	Vocal Producer	2013
Pedro Del Mar	Mellomania 22	Black Hole Recordings	Vocal Producer	2013
India.Arie	SongVersation	Motown Records	Mixing	2013
TGT	Three Kings	Atlantic Records	Editing, Engineering, Mixing	2013
Terraplane Sun	Friends	Terraplane Sun	Mixing	2012
Karen Souza	Hotel Souza	Music Brokers	Mixing	2012
Michael Tiernan	L.A. Can Wait	Still Listening Productions	Engineering Consultant	2011
Lost Days	Ringside	Ringside, Inc.	Mixing	2011
Tyrese	Open Invitation	Voltron Recordz	Editing/Engineering/Mixing	2011
Jud Johnson	2010	My Records	Mixing/Keyboards	2010
First State	Changing Lanes	Black Hole Recordings	Vocal Producer	2010
Ernie Halter	Franklin & Vermont	Ridge Rock Music	Composer	2010
Mateo	Get To Know Me: Live at Swing House	Myspace Records	Mixing	2009
LeToya Luckett	Lady Love	Capitol Records	Engineer	2009
Prince	LotusFlow3r	Because Music	Engineering/Mixing	2009
Ruben Studdard	Love IS	Hickory Records	Mixing	2009
Andrée Belle	M.U.S.I.C.	Andrée Belle Music	Mixing	2009
Prince	MPLSound	Because Music	Mixing	2009
Butterfly Boucher	Scary Fragile	Nettwerk/Situation Operation	Engineering, Programing	2009
The Rescues	Crazy Ever After	Adrenaline	Mixing	2008
Girlicious	Girlicious	Geffen Records	Engineer	2008
Alissa Moreno	In Your Wake	Alissa Moreno	Engineer	2008
Lalo's Urban Myth	Lalo	Lalo's Urban Myth	Mixing	2008
The Dirty Disco	Retrosexxxual/Dirty Disco	Universal	Mixing	2008
Kyler England	Simple Machine	Gypsy Rock Music	Producer, Engineer, Mixing, Guitar (Electric), Keyboards, Programming, Bass, String Arrangements	2008
The Strange Familiar	You Can't Go Back	Paper Doll Records	Engineer	2008
Ying Foo/Corrine May	Beautiful Seed	Pink Armchair Records	String Engineer	2007
Andrea Stolpe	You Can't Go Back	Andrea Stolpe	Piano	2007
Jill Cunnif	City Beach	The Militia Group	Mixing	2007
Chaka Khan	Funk This	Burgundy Records	Engineer	2007
The Isley Brothers	I'll Be Home For Christmas	Def Soul Classics	Mixing	2007
Kyler England	Live Wire, Vol. 2, The Official Bootlegs/the Green Room Sessions	Gypsy Rock Music	Mastering, Composer	2007
Patti LaBelle	Miss Patti's Christmas	Def Soul Classics	Mixing	2007
David Greenberger	1001 Real Apes	Pel Pel Records	Trumpet	2006
Akeelah and the Bee	Original Soundtrack	Lionsgate	Mixing	2006
Tyrese	Alter Ego	J Records	Engineer, Mixing	2006
Tom Sheehan	Confession In The Back Room	19 North Records	Mixing	2006
Lalo	Half Moon	Kadooga	Mixing	2006
Robin McKelle	Introducing Robin McKelle	Cheap Lullaby Records	Engineer	2006
Jenny Bruce	Left Of July	Jenny Bruce Records	Mixing	2006
Various Artists	Punk Goes 90s	Punk Goes 90s	Mixing	2006
Kyler England	The Green Room Sessions EP	Gypsy Rock Music	Producer, Engineer, Mixing, Piano, Keyboards, Programming	2006
Mashica	The Real Thing	Ransom Entertainment	Mixing	2006
Ol' Dirty Bastard	A Son Unique	Def Jam	Mixing	2005
Guy Sebastian	Beautiful Life/Just As I Am	Sony Music	Engineer	2005
The Fallwater Project	Bridge The Gap	The Fallwater Project	Mixing	2005
Desperate Housewives	TV Soundtrack	Hollywood Records	Engineer, Mixing	2005
Nest	EP	Monog Records	Producer, Engineer, Mixing	2005
Nina Shaw	For You	MIG Records	Mixing	2005
Adrienne Lau	Hypnotic	MIG Records	Mixing	2005
Kindred The Family Soul	In This Life Together	Hidden Beach	Digital Editing	2005
Randy & The Bloody Lovelies	Lift	Cheap Lullaby Records	Engineer	2005
Howie Day	Live From...	Epic Records	Engineer	2005
RU	RU Ready	MIG Records	Mixing	2005
Sound Of Urchin	The Diamond	Hybrid Recordings	Engineer	2005
Adrianne	10,000 Stones	Not On This Label	Mixing	2004
Guy Sebastian	Beautiful Life	Sony Music	Engineer	2004
Usher	Confessions	Arista Records	Mixing	2004
Uri Caine	Dark Flame	Unknown	Engineer	2004
Kyler	Flower Grows in Stone	Gypsy Rock Records	Producer, Engineer, Mixing, Guitar (Electric), Cello, Piano, Keyboards, Programming, Bass, Choir/Chorus	2004
Grammy Nominees	2004	BMG Records	Engineer	2004
The Weepies	Happiness	Independent	Mixing	2004
Macy Gray	The Very Best of Macy Gray	Epic Records	Engineer	2004
2 Fast 2 Furious	Movie	Epic Records	Engineer	2003
Across 155th St.: The EBC at Rucker Park	Soundtrack	Melee Records	Engineer, Mixing	2003
Joe	And Then	Jive Records	Engineer	2003
Concord Records 30th Anniversary	Soundtrack	Concord Jazz	Assistant Engineer, Mixing	2003
Hip Hop Story	Soundtrack	Ark 21 Records	Engineer	2003
The Brooklyn Tabernacle Choir	Live...This Is Your House	Word Distribution	Engineer, Vocal Engineer	2003
Laura Berman	Love Will	Orange Ray	Producer, Engineer, Mixing, Fender Rhodes, Organ, Hammond B3, Wurlitzer, Mellotron, Programming, Bass, Musician	2003
24 K	Quotable	Madd Music	Engineer, Keyboards	2003
Parts & Labor	Rise, Rise, Rise	Narnack Records	Mixing, Mastering	2003
Joanie Leeds	Soul From My Footsteps	Limbostar	Producer, Engineer, Mixing, Guitar (Baritone), Piano, Organ, Wurlitzer, Keyboards, Synthesizer, Vibraphone, Vocals (Background)	2003
OutKast	Speakerboxxx/The Love Below	Arista Records	Engineer	2003
Rita Marley	Sunshine After Rain	Snapper	Assistant Engineer	2003
Wycliffe Gordon	The Joyride	Nagel Heyer Records	Assistant Engineer	2003
Kate & Anna McGarrigle	Vache Qui Pleure	La Tribu Records	Engineer	2003
Fountains of Wayne	Welcome Interstate Managers	S-Curve	Engineer	2003
Howard McGillin	Where Time Stands Still	Q & W Music	Engineering, Mixing	2003
54th Platoon	All or N.O.thin'	Fubu	Mixing	2002
The Brooklyn Tabernacle Choir	Be Glad	M2 Records	Engineering, Digital Editing	2002
Uri Caine	Bedrock	WEA/Warner	Assistant Engineer	2002
The Blank Theory	Beyond The Calm of the Corridor	Winter & Winter	Engineer	2002
Angie Martinez	Coast to Coast (Suavemente)	WEA	Assistant Engineer	2002
Lalo	Lalo	Kadooga	Producer, Engineer, Mixing	2002
Jerzee Monet	Love & War	DreamWorks	Engineer	2002
Shekinah: 13 Artists	13 Artists	Epic	Producer, Engineer, Mixing, Piano	2002
Crank Yankers	The Best Uncensored Crank Calls, Vol. 1	Comedy Central Records	Engineer	2002
The Fix	Scarface	Comedy Central Records	Engineer	2002
A Twist of Marley: A Tribute	A Tribute	GRP	Engineer	2002
Karrin Allyson	Ballads: Remembering John Coltrane	Concord Jazz	Assistant Engineer	2001
Barbara Cook	Barbara Cook Sings Mostly Sondheim: Live at Carnegie Hall	DRG	Assistant Engineer	2001
Edwin McCain	Far From Over	Atlantic Records	Piano, Assistant Engineer	2001
Forbidden Broadway, Vol.7:2001	A Spook Odyssey	DRG Theater	Assistant Engineer	2001
Eric Reed	Happiness	Nagel Heyer Records	Assistant Engineer	2001
Kyler	How Many Angels?	Gypsy Rock Records	Producer, Engineer, Arranger, Mixing, Piano, Keyboards, Programming, Bass, String Arrangements	2001
The Brooklyn Tabernacle Choir	Light Of The World	Sony Music	Engineer, Assistant Engineer, Recording	2001
David Murray Power Quartet	Like A Kiss That Never Ends	Justin Time	Assistant	2001
Harold Alden/Terrie Richards Alden	Love	Nagel Heyer Records	Assistant Engineer	2001
Angie Stone	Mahogany Soul	Arista Records	Mixing, Assistant Engineer	2001
David Mead	Mind and Yours	RCA Records	Mixing	2001
Marcus Miller	M²	Telarc Distribution	Engineer, Assistant Engineer	2001
John Phillips	Phillips 66	Eagle Rock	Engineer, Assistant Engineer	2001
Lisa "Left Eye" Lopez	Supernova	Eagle Rock	Engineer, Assistant Engineer	2001
The Verve Pipe	Underneath	RCA Records	Assistant Engineer, Mixing Engineer	2001
Angie Martinez	Up Close and Personal	Elektra Records	Engineer, Assistant Engineer	2001
George Antheil	Ballet Mechanique	Elektra Records	Assistant Engineer	2001
Linda Eder	Christmas Stays The Same	Atlantic Records	Violin, Assistant Engineer	2001
DJ Hasebe	Hey World	Warner Music	Digital, Assistant Engineer	2000
Kyler	If The World Would Just End	Gypsy Rock Records	Producer, Engineer, Mixing, Inspiration, Piano, Keyboards, Programming, Organ (Hammond), String Arrangements, Drum Loop, Bass Arrangement, Arrangement Transcription	2000
Guru	Jazzmatazz, Vol. 2: Streetsoul	Virgin Records	Assistant	2000
Lauri des Marais/Erik Lindgren	Jazzmatazz, Vol. 2: Streetsoul	Arf! Arf!	Editing	2000
The Music Man	2000 Broadway Revival Cast Recording	Q Records	Assistant Engineer	2000
Capone-N-Noreaga	The Reunion	Tommy Boy	Engineer, Assistant Engineer, Mixing Assistant	2000
Ballet Mecanique & Other Works	For Player Pianos, Percussion, and Electronics	Electronic Music Foundation	Assistant Engineer	2000
Can You Read This Boston?	Can You Read This Boston?	Big Girl Records	Producer	1999
Adrianne	For Adeline	Pivotme	Engineer	1998
A Fine & Private Place	A Musical Fantasy	Clearsong Records	Mixing, Editing, Mixing Engineer	1989
Boyz II Men	Already Gone	BMG	Mixing Engineer	1989

== Music mixing in film scoring ==
Year	Production	Role
2017	Virginia Minnesota (Movie)	Score Mixer
2017	Valley of Bones (Movie)	Score Mixer, Score Recordist
2017	The New Edition Story (TV Mini-Series/3 Episodes)	Music Mixer
2016	The Snowy Day (TV Movie)	Music Mixer
2016	Mixed Match (Documentary)	Score Mixer
2016	Lego Star Wars: The Freemaker Adventures (TV Series/13 Episodes)	Score Mixer
2015	Himalaya: Ladder to Paradise (Documentary)	Music Mixer
2013	Sport in America: Our Defining Stories (TV Movie Documentary)	Score Mixer
2013	Black Nativity (Movie)	Music Mixer
2005	Son of the Mask (Movie)	Music Mixer, Music Recordist
2003	Bad Boy Made Good: The Revival of George Antheil's 1924 Ballet Mechanique (Documentary)	Assistant Music Mixer
2003	Luck (Movie)	Score Mixer, Score Recordist
