= October 16 =

October 16 this year in various calendars
- Friday, 16 October 2026
Akan	Nkyifie
Armenian	28 Sahmi 1476
Aztec	Izcalli 14, 7 Mazātl
Babylonian	3 Tashritu, 2337 SE
Balinese pawukon	Luang, Pepet, Kajeng, Sri, Umanis, Urukung, Sukra of Kelawu, Sri, Gigis, Pati
Bengali	31 Ashshin, BS 1433
Chinese	Yin Water Pig・Neck Mansion; Fire Horse Year, Month 9, Day 7 (Hanlu, 7 days until Shuangjiang)
Common Era	16 October 2026 CE
Coptic	6 Paopi, AM 1743
Egyptian	3 Phamenoth, 2775 NE
Ethiopian	6 Ṭeqemt, 2019 Amätä Məhrät
French Republican	Décade III, Quartidi de Vendémiaire de l'Année 235 de la République
Gregorian	16 October, AD 2026
Hebrew	5 Cheshvan, AM 5787
Hindu	Mūla・Śobhana; Solar: 30 Āśvina, 1948 SE; Lunisolar: Ṣaṣṭhī, Śukla pakṣa of Āśvina, 2083 VE; Rāudra・5127 KY・1,872,864
Icelandic	Föstudagur, 23 Haustmánuður 2026
Islamic	4 Jumada al-awwal, AH 1448 (using tabular method)
ISO week date	2026-W42-5
Japanese	6 Nagatsuki, Reiwa 8 (Kanro, 7 days until Sōkō)
Julian	3 October, AD 2026 (AM 7535)
Julian day	2461330
Korean	6 Gaedal, 4359 DE
Maya	13.0.14.0.7; 0 Zac, 7 Manik
Roman	ante diem V Nonas Octobres, MMDCCLXXIX AUC
Solar Hijri	24 Mehr, SH 1405
Tibetan	6 tha skar, me pho rta 2153 or 1772 or 1000

<<	October					>>
Su	Mo	Tu	We	Th	Fr	Sa
				1	2	3
4	5	6	7	8	9	10
11	12	13	14	15	16	17
18	19	20	21	22	23	24
25	26	27	28	29	30	31
2026

October 16 in recent years
2026 (Friday)
2025 (Thursday)
2024 (Wednesday)
2023 (Monday)
2022 (Sunday)
2021 (Saturday)
2020 (Friday)
2019 (Wednesday)
2018 (Tuesday)
2017 (Monday)

October 16 is the 289th day of the year (290th in leap years) in the Gregorian calendar; 76 days remain until the end of the year.

== Events ==
=== Pre-1600 ===
- 456 – Ricimer defeats Avitus at Piacenza and becomes master of the Western Roman Empire.
- 690 – Empress Wu Zetian ascends to the throne of the Tang dynasty and proclaims herself ruler of the Chinese Empire.
- 912 – Abd ar-Rahman III becomes the eighth Emir of Córdoba.
- 955 – King Otto I defeats a Slavic revolt in what is now Mecklenburg-Vorpommern.
- 1311 – The Council of Vienne convenes for the first time.
- 1367 – Pope Urban V enters Rome, the first pope to do so in more than fifty years since the beginning of the Avignon Papacy.
- 1384 – Jadwiga is crowned King of Poland, although she is a woman.
- 1590 – Prince Gesualdo of Venosa murders his wife and her lover.

=== 1601–1900 ===
- 1736 – Mathematician William Whiston's predicted comet fails to strike the Earth.
- 1780 – American Revolutionary War: The British-led Royalton raid is the last Native American raid on New England.
- 1780 – The Great Hurricane of 1780 finishes after its sixth day, killing between 20,000 and 24,000 residents of the Lesser Antilles.
- 1793 – French Revolution: Queen Marie Antoinette is executed.
- 1793 – War of the First Coalition: French victory at the Battle of Wattignies forces Austria to raise the siege of Maubeuge.
- 1805 – War of the Third Coalition: Napoleon surrounds the Austrian army at Ulm.
- 1813 – The Sixth Coalition attacks Napoleon in the four-day Battle of Leipzig.
- 1817 – Italian explorer and archaeologist Giovanni Belzoni, uncovered the Tomb of Seti I in the Valley of the Kings.
- 1817 – Simón Bolívar sentences Manuel Piar to death for challenging the racial-caste in Venezuela.
- 1834 – Much of the ancient structure of the Palace of Westminster in London burns to the ground.
- 1836 – Great Trek: Afrikaner voortrekkers repulse a Matabele attack, but lose their livestock.
- 1841 – Queen's University is founded in the Province of Canada.
- 1843 – William Rowan Hamilton invents quaternions, a three-dimensional system of complex numbers.
- 1846 – William T. G. Morton administers ether anesthesia during a surgical operation.
- 1859 – Origins of the American Civil War: Abolitionist John Brown and his supporters launch a raid on Harpers Ferry, Virginia (now West Virginia).
- 1869 – The Cardiff Giant, one of the most famous American hoaxes, is "discovered".
- 1869 – Girton College, Cambridge is founded, becoming England's first residential college for women.
- 1875 – Brigham Young University is founded in Provo, Utah.
- 1882 – The Nickel Plate Railroad opens for business.
- 1891 – A diplomatic incident between the United States and Chile occurred after U.S. sailors were attacked in Valparaíso, nearly leading to war.

=== 1901–present ===
- 1905 – The Partition of Bengal in India takes place.
- 1909 – William Howard Taft and Porfirio Díaz hold the first summit between a U.S. and a Mexican president. They narrowly escape assassination.
- 1916 – Margaret Sanger opens the first family planning clinic in the United States.
- 1919 – Adolf Hitler delivers his first public address at a meeting of the German Workers' Party.
- 1923 – Walt Disney and his brother, Roy, found the Disney Brothers Cartoon Studio, today known as The Walt Disney Company.
- 1926 – Háry János, a Hungarian folk opera by Zoltán Kodály is premiered at the Royal Hungarian Opera House in Budapest.
- 1934 – Chinese Communists begin the Long March to escape Nationalist encirclement.
- 1939 – World War II: No. 603 Squadron RAF intercepts the first Luftwaffe raid on Britain.
- 1940 – Holocaust in Poland: The Warsaw Ghetto is established.
- 1943 – Holocaust in Italy: Raid on the Roman Ghetto.
- 1946 – Nuremberg trials: Ten defendants found guilty by the International Military Tribunal are executed by hanging.
- 1947 – The Philippines takes over the administration of the Turtle Islands and the Mangsee Islands from the United Kingdom.
- 1949 – The Greek Communist Party announces a "temporary cease-fire", thus ending the Greek Civil War.
- 1951 – The first Prime Minister of Pakistan, Liaquat Ali Khan, is assassinated in Rawalpindi.
- 1953 – Cuban revolutionary Fidel Castro delivers his "History Will Absolve Me" speech, and is sentenced to 15 years' imprisonment by the Fulgencio Batista government for leading an attack on the Moncada Barracks.
- 1962 – Cuban Missile Crisis begins: U.S. President John F. Kennedy is informed of photos taken on October 14 by a U-2 showing nuclear missiles (the crisis will last for 13 days starting from this point).
- 1964 – China detonates its first nuclear weapon.
- 1964 – Leonid Brezhnev becomes leader of the Soviet Communist Party, while Alexei Kosygin becomes the head of government.
- 1968 – Tommie Smith and John Carlos are ejected from the US Olympic team for participating in the Olympics Black Power salute.
- 1968 – Kingston, Jamaica is rocked by the Rodney riots, inspired by the barring of Walter Rodney from the country.
- 1968 – Yasunari Kawabata becomes the first Japanese person to be awarded the Nobel Prize in Literature.
- 1970 – Canadian Prime Minister Pierre Trudeau invokes the War Measures Act during the October Crisis.
- 1973 – Henry Kissinger and Lê Đức Thọ are awarded the Nobel Peace Prize.
- 1975 – Indonesian troops kill the Balibo Five, a group of Australian journalists, in Portuguese Timor.
- 1975 – Three-year-old Rahima Banu, from Bangladesh, is the last known case of naturally occurring smallpox.
- 1975 – The Australian Coalition sparks a constitutional crisis when they vote to defer funding for the government's annual budget.
- 1978 – Cardinal Karol Wojtyła is elected to the papacy as Pope John Paul II, he becomes the first non-Italian pontiff since 1523.
- 1984 – Desmond Tutu is awarded the Nobel Peace Prize.
- 1991 – George Hennard runs amok in Killeen, Texas, killing 23 and wounding 20.
- 1995 – The Million Man March takes place in Washington, D.C. About 837,000 attend.
- 1995 – The Skye Bridge in Scotland is opened.
- 1996 – Eighty-four football fans die and 180 are injured in a massive crush at a match in Guatemala City.
- 1998 – Former Chilean dictator Augusto Pinochet is arrested in London on a murder extradition warrant.
- 1999 – The magnitude 7.1 Hector Mine earthquake strikes Southern California
- 2002 – The Bibliotheca Alexandrina opens in Egypt, commemorating the ancient library of Alexandria.
- 2013 – Lao Airlines Flight 301 crashes on approach to Pakse International Airport in Laos, killing 49 people.
- 2017 – Storm Ophelia strikes the U.K. and Ireland causing major damage and power loss.

== Births ==
=== Pre-1600 ===
- 1351 – Gian Galeazzo Visconti, first Duke of Milan (died 1402)
- 1396 – William de la Pole, 1st Duke of Suffolk, English admiral (died 1450)
- 1430 – James II of Scotland (died 1460)
- 1483 – Gasparo Contarini, Italian cardinal and diplomat (died 1542)
- 1535 – Niwa Nagahide, Japanese samurai (died 1585)
- 1588 – Luke Wadding, Irish Franciscan friar and historian (died 1657)

=== 1601–1900 ===
- 1605 – Charles Coypeau d'Assoucy, French writer and composer (died 1677)
- 1620 – Pierre Paul Puget, French painter and sculptor (died 1694)
- 1678 – Anna Waser, Swiss painter (died 1714)
- 1679 – Jan Dismas Zelenka, Czech viol player and composer (died 1745)
- 1710 – András Hadik, Austrian-Hungarian field marshal (died 1790)
- 1714 – Giovanni Arduino, Italian geologist and academic (died 1795)
- 1726 – Daniel Chodowiecki, Polish-German painter and educator (died 1801)
- 1729 – Pierre van Maldere, Belgian violinist and composer (died 1768)
- 1752 – Johann Gottfried Eichhorn, German theologian and academic (died 1827)
- 1754 – Morgan Lewis, American general, lawyer, and politician, 3rd Governor of New York (died 1844)
- 1758 – Noah Webster, American lexicographer (died 1843)
- 1762 – Paul Hamilton, American soldier and politician, 3rd United States Secretary of the Navy (died 1816)
- 1789 – William Burton, American physician and politician, 39th Governor of Delaware (died 1866)
- 1795 – William Buell Sprague, American minister, historian, and author (died 1876)
- 1802 – Isaac Murphy, American educator and politician, 8th Governor of Arkansas (died 1882)
- 1803 – Robert Stephenson, English railway and civil engineer (died 1859)
- 1804 – Benjamin Russell, American painter and educator (died 1885)
- 1806 – William P. Fessenden, American lawyer and politician, 26th United States Secretary of the Treasury (died 1869)
- 1815 – Francis Lubbock, American colonel and politician, 9th Governor of Texas (died 1905)
- 1818 – William Forster, Indian-Australian politician, 4th Premier of New South Wales (died 1882)
- 1819 – Austin F. Pike, American lawyer and politician (died 1886)
- 1827 – Arnold Böcklin, Swiss painter (died 1901)
- 1831 – Lucy Stanton, American activist (died 1910)
- 1832 – Vicente Riva Palacio, Mexican liberal intellectual, novelist (died 1896)
- 1840 – Kuroda Kiyotaka, Japanese general and politician, 2nd Prime Minister of Japan (died 1900)
- 1841 – Itō Hirobumi, Japanese lawyer and politician, 1st Prime Minister of Japan (died 1909)
- 1847 – Maria Pia of Savoy, Queen Consort of Luis I of Portugal (died 1911)
- 1852 – Carl von In der Maur, Governor of Liechtenstein (died 1913)
- 1854 – Karl Kautsky, Czech-German journalist, philosopher, and theologian (died 1938)
- 1854 – Oscar Wilde, Irish playwright, novelist, and poet (died 1900)
- 1855 – Samad bey Mehmandarov, Azerbaijani general and politician, 3rd Azerbaijani Minister of Defense (died 1931)
- 1861 – J. B. Bury, Irish historian and scholar (died 1927)
- 1861 – Richard Sears, American tennis player (died 1943)
- 1863 – Austen Chamberlain, English businessman and politician, Chancellor of the Exchequer, Nobel Prize laureate (died 1937)
- 1867 – Mario Ruspoli, 2nd Prince of Poggio Suasa (died 1963)
- 1869 – Claude H. Van Tyne, American historian and author (died 1930)
- 1872 – Walter Buckmaster, English polo player and businessman, co-founded Buckmaster & Moore (died 1942)
- 1873 – Juho Kekkonen, Finnish forestry manager and tenant farmer (died 1928)
- 1876 – Jimmy Sinclair, South African cricketer and rugby player (died 1913)
- 1881 – William Orthwein, American swimmer and water polo player (died 1955)
- 1884 – Rembrandt Bugatti, Italian sculptor (died 1916)
- 1886 – David Ben-Gurion, Polish-Israeli soldier and politician, 1st Prime Minister of Israel (died 1973)
- 1888 – Eugene O'Neill, American playwright, Nobel Prize laureate (died 1953)
- 1888 – Paul Popenoe, American founder of relationship counseling (died 1979)
- 1890 – Michael Collins, Irish general and politician, 2nd Irish Minister for Finance (died 1922)
- 1890 – Maria Goretti, Italian martyr and saint (died 1902)
- 1890 – Paul Strand, American photographer and director (died 1975)
- 1897 – Louis de Cazenave, French soldier (died 2008)
- 1898 – William O. Douglas, American lawyer and jurist (died 1980)
- 1900 – Edward Ardizzone, Vietnamese-English author and illustrator (died 1979)
- 1900 – Primo Conti, Italian painter and poet (died 1988)
- 1900 – Goose Goslin, American baseball player and manager (died 1971)

=== 1901–present ===
- 1903 – Cecile de Brunhoff, French author and pianist (died 2003)
- 1903 – Big Joe Williams, American Delta blues singer-songwriter and guitarist (died 1982)
- 1904 – Björn Berglund, Swedish actor (died 1968)
- 1905 – Ernst Kuzorra, German footballer and manager (died 1990)
- 1906 – León Klimovsky, Argentinian actor, director, and screenwriter (died 1996)
- 1907 – Richard Titmuss, English sociologist and academic (died 1973)
- 1908 – Olivia Coolidge, English-American author and educator (died 2006)
- 1908 – Enver Hoxha, Albanian general and politician, Prime Minister of Albania (died 1985)
- 1911 – Otto von Bülow, German commander (died 2006)
- 1912 – Clifford Hansen, American rancher and politician, 26th Governor of Wyoming (died 2009)
- 1918 – Louis Althusser, Algerian-French philosopher and academic (died 1990)
- 1918 – Abraham Nemeth, American mathematician and academic (died 2013)
- 1918 – Tony Rolt, English race car driver and engineer (died 2008)
- 1919 – Kathleen Winsor, American journalist and author (died 2003)
- 1920 – Paddy Finucane, Irish fighter pilot and flying ace (died 1942)
- 1921 – Matt Batts, American baseball player and coach (died 2013)
- 1921 – Sita Ram Goel, Indian historian, publisher and writer (died 2003)
- 1921 – MacKenzie Miller, American horse trainer and breeder (died 2010)
- 1922 – Max Bygraves, English-Australian actor and singer (died 2012)
- 1922 – Leon Sullivan, American minister and activist (died 2001)
- 1923 – Linda Darnell, American actress (died 1965)
- 1923 – Bert Kaempfert, German conductor and composer (died 1980)
- 1923 – Bill McLaren, Scottish rugby player and sportscaster (died 2010)
- 1924 – Gerard Parkes, Irish-Canadian actor (died 2014)
- 1925 – Daniel J. Evans, American politician, 16th Governor of Washington (died 2024)
- 1925 – Angela Lansbury, English-American actress, singer, and producer (died 2022)
- 1926 – Charles Dolan, American businessman, founded Cablevision and HBO (died 2024)
- 1926 – Ed Valigursky, American illustrator (died 2009)
- 1927 – Günter Grass, German novelist, poet, playwright, Nobel Prize laureate (died 2015)
- 1927 – Rosa Rosal, Filipino actress (died 2025)
- 1928 – Mary Daly, American philosopher and theologian (died 2010)
- 1928 – Ann Morgan Guilbert, American actress (died 2016)
- 1929 – Fernanda Montenegro, Brazilian actress
- 1930 – John Polkinghorne, English physicist, theologian and priest (died 2021)
- 1930 – Carmen Sevilla, Spanish actress (died 2023)
- 1931 – Charles Colson, American lawyer and politician (died 2012)
- 1931 – Valery Klimov, Ukrainian-Russian violinist and educator (died 2022)
- 1931 – P. W. Underwood, American football player and coach (died 2013)
- 1932 – John Grant, English journalist and politician (died 2000)
- 1932 – Henry Lewis, American bassist and conductor (died 1996)
- 1932 – Lucien Paiement, Canadian physician and politician (died 2013)
- 1933 – Nobuyo Ōyama, Japanese voice actress (died 2024)
- 1934 – Peter Ashdown, English race car driver
- 1936 – Peter Bowles, English actor and screenwriter (died 2022)
- 1936 – Andrei Chikatilo, Ukrainian-Russian serial killer (died 1994)
- 1936 – Mladen Koščak, Croatian footballer (died 1997)
- 1936 – Akira Machida, Japanese lawyer and judge, 15th Chief Justice of Japan (died 2015)
- 1937 – Emile Ford, Saint Lucia-born British singer and first Black British musician to sell over one million copies of a single (died 2016)
- 1938 – Carl Gunter, Jr., American politician (died 1999)
- 1938 – Allan Massie, Scottish literary critic and novelist (died 2026)
- 1938 – Nico, German singer-songwriter, model, and actress (died 1988)
- 1940 – Barry Corbin, American actor and producer
- 1940 – Dave DeBusschere, American basketball player and coach (died 2003)
- 1940 – Ivan Della Mea, Italian singer-songwriter, guitarist, and journalist (died 2009)
- 1941 – Mel Counts, American basketball player
- 1941 – Tim McCarver, American baseball player and sportscaster (died 2023)
- 1941 – Emma Nicholson, Baroness Nicholson of Winterbourne, English computer programmer and politician
- 1943 – Fred Turner, Canadian singer-songwriter and bass player
- 1944 – Kaizer Motaung, South African footballer and manager
- 1944 – Elizabeth Loftus, American psychologist
- 1945 – Stefan Buczacki, English horticulturalist, botanist, and television host
- 1945 – Roger Hawkins, American session drummer (died 2021)
- 1945 – Paul Monette, American author and poet (died 1995)
- 1946 – Geoff Barnett, English footballer (died 2021)
- 1946 – Suzanne Somers, American actress and producer (died 2023)
- 1947 – Nicholas Day, English actor
- 1947 – Terry Griffiths, Welsh snooker player and coach (died 2024)
- 1947 – Bob Weir, American singer-songwriter and guitarist (died 2026)
- 1947 – David Zucker, American director, producer, and screenwriter
- 1948 – Alison Chitty, English production designer and costume designer
- 1948 – Bruce Fleisher, American golfer (died 2021)
- 1948 – Hema Malini, Indian actress, director, producer, and politician
- 1948 – Leo Mazzone, American baseball player and coach
- 1950 – Angry Grandpa, American internet personality (died 2017)
- 1950 – Károly Horváth, Romanian-Hungarian cellist, flute player, and composer (died 2015)
- 1952 – Christopher Cox, American lawyer and politician
- 1952 – Cordell Mosson, American bass player (died 2013)
- 1952 – Crazy Mohan, Indian actor, screenwriter, and playwright (died 2019)
- 1952 – Glenys Thornton, Baroness Thornton, English politician
- 1953 – Tony Carey, American keyboard player, songwriter, and producer
- 1953 – Paulo Roberto Falcão, Brazilian footballer and manager
- 1953 – K. S. Kugathasan, Sri Lankan politician
- 1953 – Brinsley Forde, British singer and actor
- 1954 – Lorenzo Carcaterra, American author and blogger
- 1954 – Michael Forsyth, Baron Forsyth of Drumlean, Scottish politician, Secretary of State for Scotland
- 1954 – Serafino Ghizzoni, Italian rugby player
- 1954 – Corinna Harfouch, German actress
- 1955 – Kieran Doherty, Irish Republican and politician, died on hunger strike (died 1981)
- 1955 – Ellen Dolan, American actress
- 1956 – Marin Alsop, American violinist and conductor
- 1956 – John Chavis, American football player and coach
- 1956 – Meg Rosoff, American-English author
- 1956 – Rudra Mohammad Shahidullah, Bangladeshi poet, author, and playwright (died 1991)
- 1957 – Priidu Beier, Estonian poet and educator
- 1958 – Roy McDonough, English footballer and manager
- 1958 – Tim Robbins, American actor, director, and screenwriter
- 1959 – Kevin Brennan, Welsh journalist and politician
- 1959 – Brian Harper, American baseball player
- 1959 – Gary Kemp, English singer-songwriter, guitarist, and actor
- 1959 – Philip Maini, Northern Irish mathematician at the University of Oxford
- 1959 – Tessa Munt, English lawyer and politician
- 1959 – Jamie Salmon, English-New Zealand rugby player and sportscaster
- 1959 – Erkki-Sven Tüür, Estonian flute player and composer
- 1959 – John Whittingdale, English politician
- 1960 – Guy LeBlanc, Canadian keyboard player and songwriter (died 2015)
- 1960 – Bob Mould, American singer-songwriter, guitarist, and producer
- 1961 – Chris Doleman, American football player (died 2020)
- 1961 – Marc Levy, French author
- 1961 – Scott O'Hara, American pornographic performer, author, poet, editor and publisher (died 1998)
- 1961 – Randy Vasquez, American actor, director, and producer
- 1962 – Manute Bol, Sudanese-American basketball player and activist (died 2010)
- 1962 – Flea, Australian-American bass player, songwriter, and actor
- 1962 – Dmitri Hvorostovsky, Russian opera singer (died 2017)
- 1962 – Nico Lazaridis, German footballer
- 1962 – Tamara McKinney, American skier
- 1963 – Brendan Kibble, Australian singer-songwriter and guitarist
- 1963 – Timothy Leighton, English physicist and academic
- 1964 – Shawn Little, Canadian lawyer and politician (died 2012)
- 1964 – James Thompson, American-Finnish author (died 2014)
- 1965 – Kang Kyung-ok, South Korean illustrator
- 1965 – German Titov, Russian ice hockey player and coach
- 1965 – Tom Tolbert, American basketball player and sportscaster
- 1966 – Olof Lundh, Swedish journalist
- 1966 – Mary Elizabeth McGlynn, American voice actress, singer, and director
- 1967 – Michael Laffy, Australian footballer
- 1967 – Davina McCall, English television host and actress
- 1968 – Randall Batinkoff, American actor and producer
- 1968 – Mark Lee, Singaporean actor and singer
- 1968 – Francesco Libetta, Italian pianist, composer, and conductor
- 1968 – Todd Stashwick, American actor and writer
- 1968 – Elsa Zylberstein, French actress
- 1969 – Roy Hargrove, American trumpet player and composer (died 2018)
- 1969 – Takao Omori, Japanese wrestler
- 1969 – Terri J. Vaughn, American actress and producer
- 1969 – Wendy Wilson, American singer-songwriter
- 1970 – Kazuyuki Fujita, Japanese wrestler and mixed martial artist
- 1970 – Mehmet Scholl, German footballer and manager
- 1971 – Frank Cuesta, Spanish television presenter
- 1971 – Chad Gray, American singer-songwriter and guitarist
- 1971 – Paul Sparks, American actor
- 1972 – Adrianne Frost, American comedian, actress, and author
- 1972 – Darius Kasparaitis, Lithuanian-American ice hockey player and coach
- 1972 – Kordell Stewart, American football player and radio host
- 1973 – Justin Credible, American wrestler
- 1973 – David Unsworth, English footballer and manager
- 1974 – Aurela Gaçe, Albanian singer
- 1974 – Paul Kariya, Canadian ice hockey player
- 1975 – Ernesto Noel Aquino, Honduran footballer
- 1975 – Brynjar Gunnarsson, Icelandic footballer
- 1975 – Jacques Kallis, South African cricketer
- 1975 – Kellie Martin, American actress, director, and producer
- 1977 – John Mayer, American singer-songwriter, guitarist, and producer
- 1977 – Björn Yttling, Swedish singer-songwriter, musician, producer and member of Peter, Bjorn and John
- 1980 – Sue Bird, Israeli-American basketball player
- 1980 – Jeremy Jackson, American actor and singer
- 1980 – Caterina Scorsone, Canadian-American actress
- 1980 – Timana Tahu, Australian rugby league player
- 1981 – Brea Grant, American actress and writer
- 1981 – Martin Halle, Danish footballer
- 1981 – Boyd Melson, American boxer
- 1981 – Anthony Reyes, American baseball player
- 1982 – Alan Anderson, American basketball player
- 1982 – Frédéric Michalak, French rugby player
- 1982 – Cristian Riveros, Paraguayan footballer
- 1982 – Prithviraj Sukumaran, Indian actor, singer, and producer
- 1983 – Philipp Kohlschreiber, German tennis player
- 1983 – Loreen, Swedish singer
- 1983 – Kenny Omega, Canadian wrestler
- 1984 – François Pervis, French track cyclist
- 1984 – Rachel Reilly, American talk show host and actress
- 1985 – Jay Beagle, Canadian ice hockey player
- 1985 – Alexis Hornbuckle, American basketball player
- 1985 – Verena Sailer, German sprinter
- 1985 – Casey Stoner, Australian motorcycle racer
- 1985 – Peter Wallace, Australian rugby league player
- 1986 – Nicky Adams, English-Welsh footballer
- 1986 – Franco Armani, Argentine footballer
- 1986 – Derk Boerrigter, Dutch footballer
- 1986 – Inna, Romanian singer
- 1988 – Zoltán Stieber, Hungarian footballer
- 1989 – Dan Biggar, Welsh rugby player
- 1991 – Jonathan Schoop, Curaçaoan baseball player
- 1991 – Shardul Thakur, Indian cricketer
- 1992 – Kostas Fortounis, Greek footballer
- 1992 – Viktorija Golubic, Swiss tennis player
- 1992 – Bryce Harper, American baseball player
- 1993 – Jovit Baldivino, Filipino singer and actor (died 2022)
- 1993 – Caroline Garcia, French tennis player
- 1994 – Adam Elliott, Australian rugby league player
- 1994 – Halimah Nakaayi, Ugandan middle-distance runner
- 1996 – Toprak Razgatlıoğlu, Turkish motorcycle racer
- 1996 – Andrea Locatelli, Italian motorcycle racer
- 1997 – Aliou Dieng, Malian footballer
- 1997 – Charles Leclerc, Monégasque racing driver
- 1997 – Naomi Osaka, Japanese tennis player
- 1999 – Aaron Nesmith, American basketball player
- 1999 – Nicolò Bulega, Italian motorcycle racer
- 2001 – Willian Pacho, Ecuadorian footballer
- 2003 – Scott Ogden, British motorcycle racer
- 2005 – Ruby Rose Turner, American actress

== Deaths ==
=== Pre-1600 ===
- 385 – Fu Jian, Chinese emperor (born 337)
- 786 – Lullus, archbishop of Mainz (born 710)
- 976 – Al-Hakam II, Umayyad caliph (born 915)
- 1027 – Fujiwara no Kenshi, Japanese empress (born 994)
- 1130 – Pedro González de Lara, Castilian magnate
- 1284 – Shams al-Din Juvayni, Persian statesman, vizier and minister of finance of the Ilkhanate
- 1323 – Amadeus V, count of Savoy (born 1249)
- 1333 – Nicholas V, antipope of Rome (born 1260)
- 1438 – Anne of Gloucester, English noblewoman (born 1383)
- 1355 – Louis the Child, king of Sicily (born 1338)
- 1523 – Luca Signorelli, Italian painter (born c.1450)
- 1553 – Lucas Cranach the Elder, German painter and engraver (born 1472)
- 1555 – Hugh Latimer, English bishop and saint (born 1487)
- 1555 – Nicholas Ridley, English bishop and martyr (born 1500)
- 1591 – Gregory XIV, pope of the Catholic Church (born 1535)
- 1594 – William Allen, English cardinal (born 1532)

=== 1601–1900 ===
- 1621 – Jan Pieterszoon Sweelinck, Dutch organist and composer (born 1562)
- 1628 – François de Malherbe, French poet and critic (born 1555)
- 1637 – Johann Rudolf Stadler, Swiss clock-maker (born 1605)
- 1649 – Isaac van Ostade, Dutch painter and illustrator (born 1621)
- 1655 – Joseph Solomon Delmedigo, Italian physician, mathematician, and theorist (born 1591)
- 1660 – John Cook, English politician, Solicitor General for England and Wales (born 1608)
- 1679 – Roger Boyle, 1st Earl of Orrery, Irish-English soldier and politician (born 1621)
- 1680 – Raimondo Montecuccoli, Italian-Austrian field marshal (born 1609)
- 1730 – Antoine Laumet de La Mothe, sieur de Cadillac, French-American explorer and politician, 3rd French Governor of Louisiana (born 1658)
- 1730 – Nevşehirli Damat Ibrahim Pasha, Greek politician, 139th Grand Vizier of the Ottoman Empire (born 1666)
- 1750 – Sylvius Leopold Weiss, German lute player and composer (born 1687)
- 1755 – Gerard Majella, Italian saint (born 1725)
- 1774 – Robert Fergusson, Scottish poet (born 1750)
- 1791 – Grigory Potemkin, Russian general and politician (born 1739)
- 1793 – Marie Antoinette, Austrian-born queen consort of Louis XVI of France (born 1755)
- 1793 – John Hunter, Scottish-English surgeon and philosopher (born 1728)
- 1796 – Victor Amadeus III of Sardinia (born 1726)
- 1799 – Veerapandiya Kattabomman Indian activist (born 1760)
- 1810 – Nachman of Breslov, Ukrainian religious leader, founded the Breslov Hasidic group (born 1772)
- 1822 – Eva Marie Veigel, Austrian-English dancer (born 1724)
- 1877 – Théodore Barrière, French playwright (born 1823)
- 1888 – John Wentworth, American journalist and politician, 19th Mayor of Chicago (born 1815)

=== 1901–present ===
- 1904 – Haritina Korotkevich, Russian heroine (born 1882)
- 1908 – Joseph Leycester Lyne, English monk (born 1837)
- 1909 – Jakub Bart-Ćišinski, German poet and playwright (born 1856)
- 1913 – Ralph Rose, American shot putter, discus, and hammer thrower (born 1885)
- 1936 – Effie Adelaide Rowlands, British writer (born 1859)
- 1937 – Jean de Brunhoff, French poet and playwright (born 1899)
- 1942 – Ulysses Argetsinger, American politician and lawyer (born 1866)
- 1946 – Nuremberg trial executions of the Main Trial:
  - Hans Frank, German lawyer, politician and war criminal (born 1900)
  - Wilhelm Frick, German lawyer and politician, German Minister of the Interior (born 1877)
  - Alfred Jodl, German general (born 1890)
  - Ernst Kaltenbrunner, Austrian SS officer (born 1903)
  - Wilhelm Keitel, German field marshal (born 1882)
  - Alfred Rosenberg, Baltic German architect and politician (born 1893)
  - Fritz Sauckel, German sailor and politician (born 1894)
  - Arthur Seyss-Inquart, Austrian lawyer and politician, 16th Federal Chancellor of Austria (born 1892)
  - Julius Streicher, German journalist and politician (born 1887)
  - Joachim von Ribbentrop, German lieutenant and politician, Minister for Foreign Affairs of Germany (born 1893)
- 1947 – Anna B. Eckstein, German peace activist (born 1868)
- 1951 – Liaquat Ali Khan, Indian-Pakistani lawyer and politician, 1st Prime Minister of Pakistan (born 1895)
- 1956 – Jules Rimet, French businessman (born 1873)
- 1957 – John Anthony Sydney Ritson, English rugby player, mines inspector, engineer and educator (born 1887)
- 1958 – Robert Redfield, American anthropologist of Mexico (born 1897)
- 1959 – Minor Hall, American drummer (born 1897)
- 1959 – George Marshall, American general and politician, 3rd United States Secretary of Defense, Nobel Prize laureate (born 1880)
- 1962 – Gaston Bachelard, French poet and philosopher (born 1884)
- 1964 – Patsy Callighen, Canadian ice hockey player (born 1906)
- 1966 – George O'Hara, American actor and screenwriter (born 1899)
- 1968 – Ellis Kinder, American baseball player (born 1914)
- 1971 – Robin Boyd, Australian architect and educator, designed the Domain Park Flats (born 1919)
- 1972 – Nick Begich, American lawyer and politician (born 1932)
- 1972 – Hale Boggs, American lawyer and politician (born 1914)
- 1972 – Leo G. Carroll, English-American actor (born 1886)
- 1973 – Gene Krupa, American drummer, composer, and actor (born 1909)
- 1975 – Vittorio Gui, Italian conductor and composer (born 1885)
- 1978 – Dan Dailey, American actor, singer, dancer, and director (born 1913)
- 1979 – Johan Borgen, Norwegian author and critic (born 1903)
- 1981 – Moshe Dayan, Israeli general and politician, 5th Foreign Affairs Minister of Israel (born 1915)
- 1981 – Eugene Eisenmann, Panamanian-American lawyer and ornithologist (born 1906)
- 1982 – Mario Del Monaco, Italian tenor (born 1915)
- 1983 – Jakov Gotovac, Croatian composer and conductor (born 1895)
- 1986 – Arthur Grumiaux, Belgian violinist and pianist (born 1921)
- 1989 – Walter Farley, American author and educator (born 1915)
- 1989 – Scott O'Dell, American journalist and author (born 1898)
- 1989 – Cornel Wilde, American actor (born 1912)
- 1990 – Art Blakey, American drummer and bandleader (born 1919)
- 1990 – Jorge Bolet, Cuban-American pianist and educator (born 1914)
- 1992 – Shirley Booth, American actress and singer (born 1898)
- 1996 – Jason Bernard, American actor (born 1938)
- 1996 – Eric Malpass, English author (born 1910)
- 1997 – Audra Lindley, American actress (born 1918)
- 1997 – James A. Michener, American author and philanthropist (born 1907)
- 1998 – Jon Postel, American computer scientist and academic (born 1943)
- 1999 – Jean Shepherd, American radio host, actor, and screenwriter (born 1921)
- 2000 – Mel Carnahan, American lieutenant, lawyer, and politician, 51st Governor of Missouri (born 1934)
- 2000 – Rick Jason, American actor (born 1923)
- 2001 – Etta Jones, American singer-songwriter (born 1928)
- 2003 – Avni Arbaş, Turkish painter (born 1919)
- 2003 – Stu Hart, Canadian wrestler and trainer (born 1915)
- 2003 – László Papp, Hungarian boxer (born 1926)
- 2004 – Pierre Salinger, American journalist and politician, 11th White House Press Secretary (born 1925)
- 2006 – John Victor Murra, Ukrainian-American anthropologist and academic (born 1916)
- 2006 – Valentín Paniagua, Peruvian lawyer and politician, 91st President of Peru (born 1936)
- 2007 – Deborah Kerr, Scottish actress (born 1921)
- 2007 – Toše Proeski, Macedonian singer-songwriter (born 1981)
- 2008 – Dagmar Normet, Estonian author and translator (born 1921)
- 2010 – Eyedea, American rapper and producer (born 1981)
- 2010 – Barbara Billingsley, American actress (born 1915)
- 2011 – Dan Wheldon, English race car driver (born 1978)
- 2012 – Frank Moore Cross, American scholar and academic (born 1921)
- 2012 – John A. Durkin, American lawyer and politician (born 1936)
- 2012 – Mario Gallegos, Jr., American firefighter and politician (born 1950)
- 2012 – Bódog Török, Hungarian handball player and coach (born 1923)
- 2012 – Eddie Yost, American baseball player and coach (born 1926)
- 2013 – Govind Purushottam Deshpande, Indian playwright and academic (born 1938)
- 2013 – George Hourmouziadis, Greek archaeologist and academic (born 1932)
- 2013 – Ed Lauter, American actor (born 1938)
- 2013 – Laurel Martyn, Australian ballerina and choreographer (born 1916)
- 2013 – Robert B. Rheault, American colonel (born 1925)
- 2013 – Saggy Tahir, Pakistani-American lawyer and politician (born 1944)
- 2014 – Ioannis Charalambopoulos, Greek colonel and politician, Deputy Prime Minister of Greece (born 1919)
- 2014 – Allen Forte, American musicologist and theorist (born 1926)
- 2014 – Seppo Kuusela, Finnish basketball player and coach (born 1934)
- 2014 – John Spencer-Churchill, 11th Duke of Marlborough, English businessman (born 1926)
- 2015 – Richard J. Cardamone, American lawyer and judge (born 1925)
- 2015 – James W. Fowler, American psychologist and academic (born 1940)
- 2015 – William James, Australian general and physician (born 1930)
- 2015 – Vera Williams, American author and illustrator (born 1927)
- 2015 – Memduh Ün, Turkish film producer, director, actor and screenwriter (born 1920)
- 2016 – Calvin Carl "Kelly" Gotlieb, Canadian professor and computer scientist (born 1921)
- 2017 – Daphne Caruana Galizia, Maltese journalist and blogger (born 1964)
- 2017 – Roy Dotrice, British actor (born 1923)
- 2017 – John Dunsworth, Canadian actor (born 1946)
- 2017 – Sean Hughes, British-born Irish stand-up comedian (born 1965)
- 2023 – Martti Ahtisaari, former President of Finland and Nobel Prize laureate (born 1937)
- 2024 – Ollie Olsen, Australian musician, composer and sound designer (born 1958)
- 2024 – Liam Payne, English singer-songwriter from One Direction (born 1993)
- 2024 – Yahya Sinwar, leader of Hamas (born 1962)

== Holidays and observances ==
- Air Force Day (Bulgaria)
- Boss's Day (United States)
- Christian feast day:
  - Balderic (Baudry) of Monfaucon
  - Bertrand of Comminges
  - Colmán of Kilroot (Colman mac Cathbaid)
  - Eliphius
  - Fortunatus of Casei
  - Gall
  - Gerard Majella
  - Hedwig of Silesia
  - Hugh Latimer (Anglicanism)
  - Junian (of Saint-Junien)
  - Lullus
  - Marguerite Marie Alacoque
  - Marie-Marguerite d'Youville
  - Nicholas Ridley (Anglicanism)
  - Silvanus of Ahun
  - Blessed Thevarparampil Kunjachan (Syro-Malabar Catholic Church / Catholic Church)
  - October 16 (Eastern Orthodox liturgics)
- Pope John Paul II Day (Poland)
- Death anniversary of Liaquat Ali Khan (Pakistan)
- Teachers' Day (Chile)
- World Food Day (International)
- Bu-Ma Democratic Protests Commemoration Day (South Korea)
