= Nancy Duff Campbell =

American lawyer

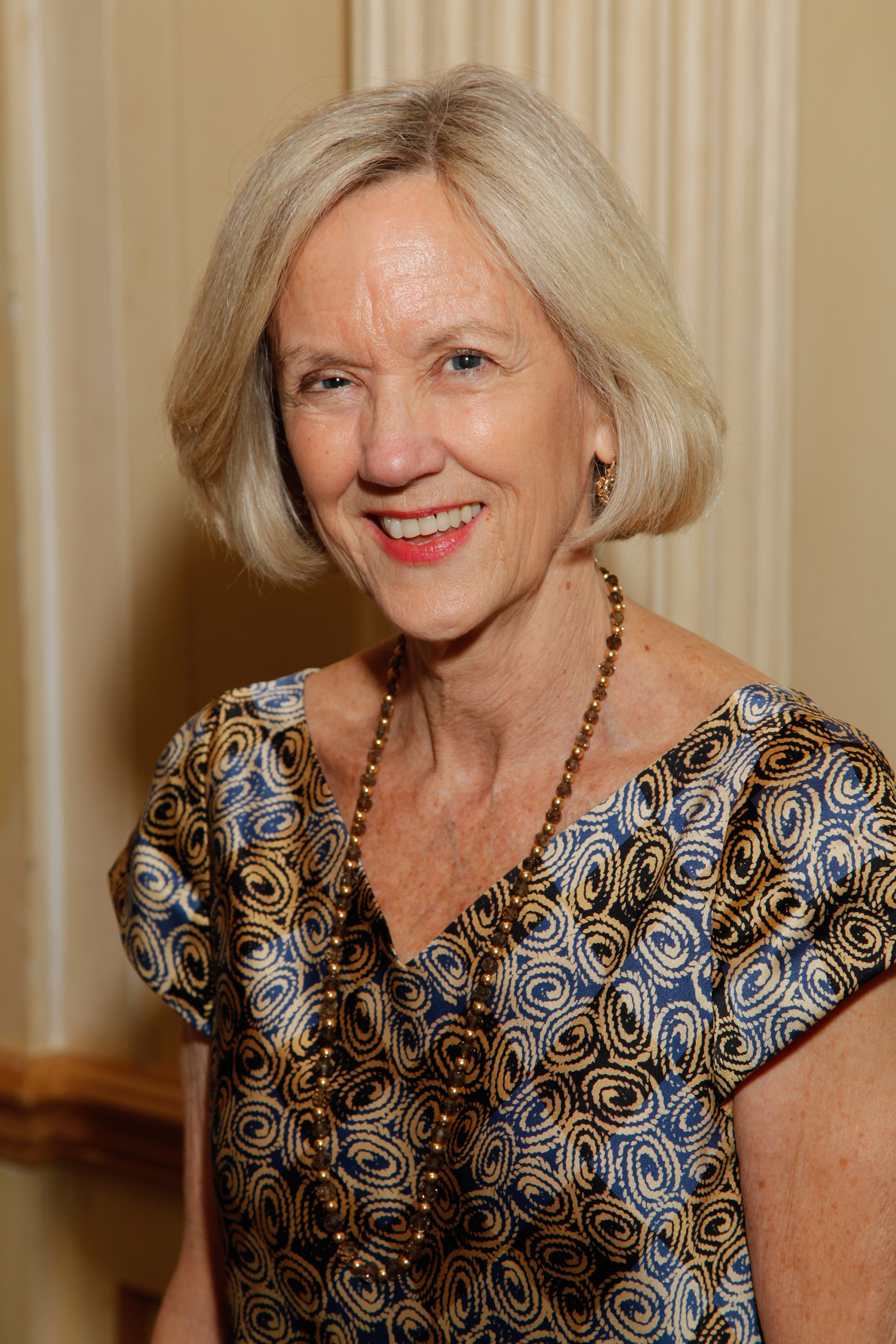
- Nancy Duff Campbell honored by Women's eNews in 2012
- Education: Barnard College; New York University School of Law
- Occupation: Lawyer
- Years active: 1970s–present
- Employers: Georgetown University Law Center; Columbus School of Law; Center on Social Welfare Policy and Law
- Organization: National Women's Law Center
- Known for: Co-founding the National Women's Law Center
- Title: Co-president emerita

For the British poet, non-fiction writer, and publisher of artist's books, see Nancy Campbell.

Nancy Duff Campbell is an American lawyer and a founder and co-president emerita of the National Women's Law Center. Campbell has focused on women's law and public policy issues and has participated in the development of legislative initiatives and litigation regarding women's rights, emphasizing issues affecting low‑income women, and has authored articles on women's legal issues.

== Biography ==
Campbell received her undergraduate degree from Barnard College in 1965 and her law degree from New York University School of Law in 1968.

Following that she became a law professor at Georgetown University Law Center and The Catholic University of America's Columbus School of Law in Washington, D.C., and an attorney with the Center on Social Welfare Policy and Law (now the Welfare Law Center) in New York. The National Women's Law Center began when female administrative staff and law students at the Center for Law and Social Policy demanded that their pay be improved, that the center hire female lawyers, that they no longer be expected to serve coffee, and that the center create a women's program. Marcia Greenberger was hired in 1972 to start the program and Campbell joined her in 1978. In 1981, the two decided to turn the program into the separate National Women's Law Center.

Campbell participated in successful Supreme Court litigation establishing that two-parent families with unemployed mothers are entitled to AFDC benefits (Califano v. Westcott, 1979). She was involved in the organization and leadership of the Coalition on Women and Taxes, which claimed to have "led to expanded tax assistance for single heads of household and the removal of six million low‑income families from the tax rolls in the Tax Reform Act of 1986". She also won a case establishing the uniform right to child support enforcement services for all custodial parents without regard to income (Parents Without Partners v. Massinga).

Campbell has been an appointee of the Defense Department Advisory Committee on Women in the Services, of Congress to the U.S. Commission on Child and Family Welfare, and of United Nations officials as the sole North American representative to the U.N. Conference on Implications for Women of the Global Financial Crisis. In November 2023, Campbell was nominated by U.S. president Joe Biden to become a member of the board of visitors to the United States Coast Guard Academy.
