= Greenberger =

Greenberger is a surname. Notable people with the surname include:

- Daniel Greenberger (born 1932), American physicist
- David Greenberger (born 1954), American artist, writer and radio commentator
- Marcia Greenberger, American lawyer
- Robert Greenberger (born 1958), American writer

== See also ==
- Francis J. Greenburger (born 1949), American real estate developer
