= National Women's Law Center =

US non-profit organization

- Founded: 1972
- Founder: Marcia Greenberger Nancy Duff Campbell
- Purpose: Women's rights, gender justice
- Location: Washington, D.C., United States
- President and CEO: Fatima Goss Graves
- Website: nwlc.org

The National Women's Law Center (NWLC) is a United States non-profit organization founded by Marcia Greenberger in 1972 and based in Washington, D.C. The Center advocates for women's rights, LGBTQ equity and inclusion through litigation, policy, and culture-change initiatives.

The NWLC created and administers the TIME'S UP Legal Defense Fund, which provides legal and public relations support to individuals who have been subject to sexual harassment and assault in the workplace.

== History ==
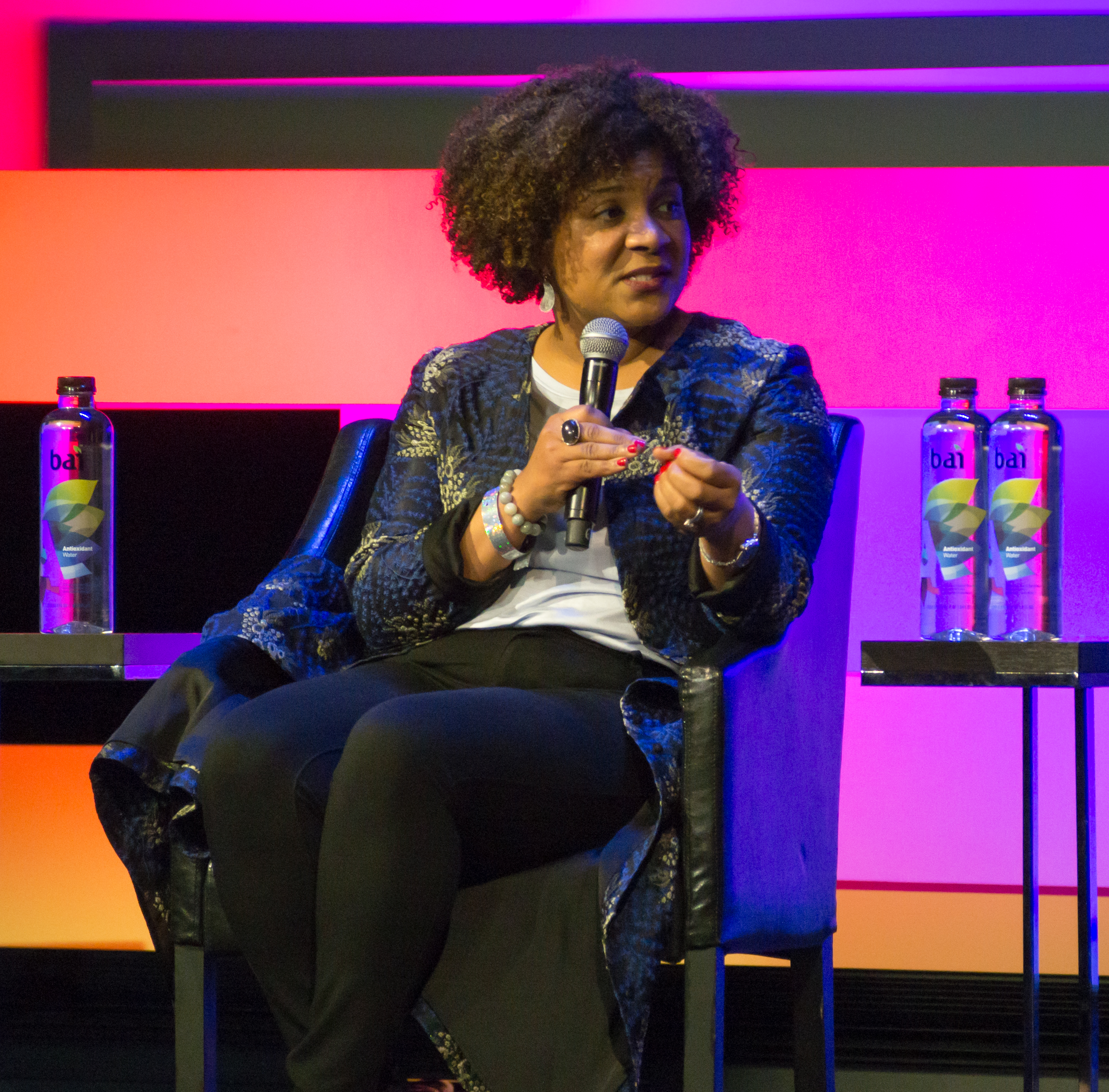
Fatima Goss Graves, President and CEO, speaking about the Time's Up movement at the 2018 Tribeca Film Festival

The National Women's Law Center originated after administrative staff and law students employed with the Center for Law and Social Policy (CLASP) asked for higher pay, an increase in the number of women being employed as lawyers, the formation of a formal women's program, and an end to the assumption that they'd serve coffee every morning.

CLASP subsequently established the Women's Rights Project in 1972 hiring attorney Marcia Greenberger to formalize the new program. She was joined by Nancy Duff Campbell in 1978, and the two of them chose to go to battle against a standard policy among American businesses: depriving pregnant women access to disability coverage. Their efforts fighting this flawed procedure led to federal passage in 1978 of the Pregnancy Discrimination Act that amended Title IX of the Civil Rights Act of 1964.

In 1981, the co-directors decided to rename the program the National Women's Law Center and set its direction toward equity and inclusion. They stepped down as co-presidents July 1, 2017, and NWLC named Fatima Goss Graves to succeed them as the new President and CEO.

== Campaigns ==
The National Women's Law Center filed an amicus curiae brief in the 1996 Supreme Court case United States v. Virginia, which concerned the male-only admission policy of the Virginia Military Institute.

Today, the NWLC focuses on child care, early learning, education and Title IX, health care, reproductive rights, courts and judges, LGBTQ equality, military, poverty, economic security, racial and ethnic justice, taxation, budgets and workplace justice.

=== TIME'S UP Legal Defense Fund ===
The NWLC administers the TIME'S UP Legal Defense Fund which provides legal and media support to individuals who have been subjected to workplace sex discrimination, including sexual harassment.

In 2022, the Fund chose to help a female rugby referee who reported the sexual misconduct of a male colleague to the United States Center for SafeSport. Although the alleged perpetrator did not dispute the allegation, SafeSport instead launched an investigation into and attempted to punish the referee for sharing documents pertaining to the case. Jennifer Mondino, Director of The Fund, said: "You would hope that [SafeSport] would be being really thoughtful and intentional about setting up their processes in a way that would help survivors. And this seems to me to be exactly the opposite of that."

=== LGBTQ equality ===
NWLC advocates for LGBTQ equality as one of its core issues. NWLC "unequivocally supports the inclusion of trans women in women’s sports" and has said that "in recent years, the far right has been attempting to divide, and thereby weaken, our feminist movement with fearmongering around transgender women athletes in women’s sports."

A statement issued in February 2020 by 16 women's rights organizations, including NWLC, the National Women's Political Caucus, Girls, Inc., Legal Momentum, End Rape on Campus, the American Association of University Women, Equal Rights Advocates and the Women's Sports Foundation read in part:

"As organizations that fight every day for equal opportunities for all women and girls, we speak from experience and expertise when we say that nondiscrimination protections for transgender people—including women and girls who are transgender—are not at odds with women’s equality or well-being, but advance them...

"We support laws and policies that protect transgender people from discrimination, including in participation in sports, and reject the suggestion that cisgender women and girls benefit from the exclusion of women and girls who happen to be transgender."

On January 28, 2025, over 170 women's rights organizations, led by NWLC, issued an open letter condemning Executive Order 14166, which defined legal recognition of women by reproductive biology. The letter called the order "cruel" and "lawless".

== Affiliations ==
The organization receives financial support from a variety of institutions aligned on women's rights policies. This includes fellow advocacy groups, academic institutions, law firms, reproductive health organizations, and pharmaceutical companies. Notable donors are Bayer, Bill & Melinda Gates Foundation, Ford Foundation, Pharmaceutical Research and Manufacturers of America (PhRMA), Rockefeller Foundation, Thomson Reuters, and Visa, among others.
