= Time's Up Legal Defense Fund =

Legal aid and advocacy organization in the US

- Nickname: TULDF
- Formation: 2018 (8 years ago)
- Founders: Roberta Kaplan, Tina Tchen, Fatima Goss Graves
- Location: Washington, D.C., United States
- Website: Website

TIME'S UP Legal Defense Fund is an organization headquartered in Washington, DC, that provides legal and media support to individuals who have been subject to workplace sexual harassment. The Fund is housed and administered by the National Women's Law Center (NWLC), a 501(c)3 non-profit organization that advocates for gender justice in the courts, in public policy, and in our society.

== History ==
The TIME'S UP Legal Defense Fund was co-founded in January 2018 by Roberta Kaplan and Tina Tchen, both formerly with the TIME'S UP Foundation, and Fatima Goss Graves, President and CEO of the National Women's Law Center. Since its inception, the fund has been operating independently from the organizations TIME’S UP Now and TIME’S UP Foundation, and has been housed and administered by the National Women’s Law Center.

In August 2021 Kaplan and Tchen resigned from their roles with the TIME'S UP Foundation after an investigation into New York governor Andrew Cuomo's sexual harassment allegations revealed TIME'S UP leadership had advised Cuomo while he was fighting the allegations. In January 2023, TIME’S UP Now and TIME’S UP Foundation ceased operations and transferred the majority of their remaining funds to TIME’S UP Legal Defense Fund.

The Fund continues to be housed and administered by the National Women’s Law Center. The Fund’s current director is Jennifer Mondino.

== Funding ==
The Fund was originally financed by fundraising through the TIME'S UP Foundation. The initial 2018 fundraising GoFundMe campaign for the TIME’S UP Legal Defense Fund raised $21 million in its first two months.

As of January 2023, the Fund is financed through fundraising by the National Women’s Law Center.

== Work ==
The Fund provides financial support for legal representation and media support and storytelling assistance in situations involving individuals who have been subject to workplace sexual harassment.

The Fund has also awarded funding to community-based organizations for community outreach and education about workplace sex harassment.

Through the NWLC’s Legal Network for Gender Equity, the Fund also connects individuals with legal help in situations involving sex discrimination, including sex harassment, in the workplace, education, and health care.

== Reception ==
The New York Times in 2019 called the Fund "Time's Up's crown jewel" and in 2021 said the initiative represented possibly Time's Up's most significant achievement.
