= Syreeta (disambiguation) =

Syreeta Wright (1946–2004) was an American singer-songwriter.

Syreeta may also refer to:

- Syreeta (1972 album), by Syreeta Wright
- Syreeta (1980 album), by Syreeta Wright

== People with the given name ==
- Syreeta Thompson, American musician, composer and producer
- Syreeta van Amelsvoort, Dutch Paralympic swimmer
