= Time's Up (organization) =

Advocacy group against sexual harassment

- Formation: January 1, 2018; 8 years ago
- Dissolved: January 21, 2023; 3 years ago
- Legal status: Defunct
- Subsidiaries: Time's Up Now; Time's Up Foundation; Time's Up Legal Defense Fund
- Website: www.timesupnow.com

Time's Up (stylised in all caps) was a non-profit organization that raised money to support victims of sexual harassment. The organization was founded on January 1, 2018, by Hollywood celebrities in response to the Weinstein effect and the Me Too movement. As of January 2020, the organization had raised $24 million in donations.

Time's Up collaborated with the National Women's Law Center to create the Time's Up Legal Defense Fund (TULDF), which provides legal and media support to individuals who have been subject to workplace sex discrimination, such as sexual harassment. The Time's Up Foundation raised money for the TULDF.

The organization came under fire after its leadership's involvement in the attempted cover-up of the Andrew Cuomo sexual harassment allegations came to light. In September 2021, Time's Up dissolved its 71-member advisory board, which included several prominent actors, as a result of the continued fallout from the group's handling of the controversy. It was also reported that its entire governing board would resign and be replaced.

In late 2022, the three board members were Ashley Judd, Nina Shaw, and financial executive Gabrielle Sulzberger. In January 2023 the organization announced it was ceasing operations.

== History ==
=== Origins and launch ===
Time's Up was founded on January 1, 2018, by female Hollywood celebrities in response to the Harvey Weinstein sexual abuse cases and the rapid expansion of the Me Too movement, with the aim of raising money to support victims of sexual harassment.

Following the exposure of the widespread sexual abuse allegations made against Harvey Weinstein in early October 2017, large numbers of women described their own experiences of sexual harassment on social media while using the hashtag #MeToo. Women within the entertainment industry accused others in the industry of sexual harassment and abuse, as media sources covered Weinstein's legal settlements for sexual misconduct with high frequency. During this time, a small group of female talent agents in Los Angeles met to brainstorm solutions to sexual harassment problems in the industry. This group quickly expanded, growing to 150 participants and began to hold weekly meetings and frequent workshops to discuss related issues and solutions.

==== January 2018 open letter ====
Time's Up publicly launched in January 2018, when the founders of Time's up published an open letter as a full-page advertisement in The New York Times and Los Angeles-based Spanish-language newspaper La Opinión. The signatories to the letter included Shonda Rhimes, Jessica Capshaw, Kate Capshaw, Ava DuVernay, Reese Witherspoon, Eva Longoria and Natalie Portman, among other high-profile women in entertainment. In the open letter, Time's Up stated that its goal was to protect working-class women from becoming victims of sexual misconduct. The group announced the creation of the Time's Up Legal Defense Fund, administered by the National Women's Law Center, which would work towards this end. Time's Up's advocacy arm also stated it would push for the creation of laws to punish companies that fail to address persistent sexual harassment.

By January 7, 2018, nearly $15 million for the Time's Up Legal Defense Fund had been raised.

===== Awards show protests =====
The January 1 full-page advertisement also called for women on the red carpet at the 75th Golden Globe Awards to wear black and speak out about sexual misconduct. Some Time's Up members brought activists to the awards ceremony and wore pins bearing the group's name. During the event, Oprah Winfrey referenced Time's Up in her speech.

The 60th Annual Grammy Awards were hosted later that January. At the awards ceremony, several female musicians donned specific items of clothing to express solidarity with Time's Up. Lady Gaga, Lana Del Rey, Kesha and Cyndi Lauper, wore white roses or all-black outfits, while Lorde's choice of outfit included an excerpt from a work by Jenny Holzer that had been printed on a card and stitched onto the back of her dress. During the awards show Janelle Monáe made a speech referencing Time's Up, calling for pay equality in the music industry and an end to sexual harassment. At the 2018 BAFTA Film Awards in London in March that year, some attendees donned black attire and wore Time's Up pins.

=== Early growth and development ===
The Time's Up organization was initially funded by contributions from Shonda Rhimes and Katie McGrath that allowed the organization it to hire seven full-time employees. According to the Los Angeles Times, the group was "initially fashioned as a democratic collective." In late 2018, Lisa Borders, former president of the WNBA and former Coca-Cola executive, was named the first president and chief executive officer of Time's Up. On February 18, 2019, she stepped down after her son was accused of sexual misconduct. Tina Tchen, formerly Chief of Staff to Michelle Obama and executive director of the White House Council on Women and Girls, was named as chief executive in October 2019.

By October 2018, Time's Up raised $22 million from donations for the Times Up Legal Defense Fund.

In January 2019, the organization launched its 4% challenge, asking production companies to show their commitment to working with a woman director on a feature production in the next 18 months. Universal Pictures, MGM Studios, Paramount Pictures and Amazon Studios pledged their support for the challenge. Using funding from Melinda Gates, in 2020 the organization created the Time's Up Impact Lab in order to research how to best prevent workplace discrimination and sexual harassment. In September 2020, Time's Up Foundation launched "Time's Up, Measure Up," a project of the Time's Up Impact Lab to study the impact of the pandemic and economic crisis on women.

That same year, Time's Up Now, the advocacy arm of Time's Up, launched a campaign titled "We Have Her Back" to support female political candidates and counter what the group described as sexist, racist and derogatory media coverage of women running for office.

=== Closure ===
In January 2023, Time's Up announced via their website that they were ceasing programmatic operations and directed survivors of workplace sexual harassment or violence to their legal defense fund site. Gabrielle Sulzberger also confirmed this, stating that the organization's board had unanimously decided to shut down the organization's operations at the end of January and that $1.7 million left in funds would be distributed to the Time's Up Legal Defense Fund.

== Mission ==
The organization's mission was to advocate and campaign to address discrimination and harassment in workplaces. Additionally, the organization carries out fundraising for the Time's Up Legal Defense Fund to provide monetary support for victims of workplace sexual discrimination so that they can take legal action, especially for individuals within lower-wage occupations and people of color.

== Criticism ==
As a movement focused on combating sexual harassment in the workplace across many industries, the Time's Up movement has received external criticism from a variety of sources. These critiques largely focus on the hypocrisy of the movement and its spokespeople, as well as the general response of Hollywood elites. Many writers have criticized Hollywood for espousing the messages of the movement without making the necessary changes in the industry that the movement is calling for. During awards season, writers called out the industry for "leaning hardest on the very women it has exploited" in order to convert their critiques and testimonies into "inspirational messages and digestible branding exercises". Others criticize the movement for a lack of diversity in its spokespeople. The majority of Time's Up representatives are notably wealthy and of celebrity status. Many progressive commentators criticize the movement for its entrenchment in celebrity culture. They claim celebrities are not committed to the cause beyond their superficial involvement in the Time's Up organization and that these (mostly) women do not represent the interests of women in real communities.

As a movement intended to combat sexual harassment across many industries, critics fear that its focus on Hollywood detracts from other industries. As a counterpoint, many bring attention to the fact that the Movement allies itself with Alianza Nacional de Campesinas. Additionally, many cite that Time's Up draws inspiration from the #MeToo movement, a campaign started and organized by activists of color like Tarana Burke. Similar critiques came to light during the Golden Globes in January 2018, when many actresses and signatories of the movement dressed in black brought prominent activists as their dates; for example, Burke arrived with Michelle Williams, and Meryl Streep brought Ai-jen Poo, director of the National Domestic Workers Alliance as her date. Other activists in attendance included Rosa Clemente, Saru Jayaraman, Billie Jean King, Marai Larasi, Calina Lawrence, and Mónica Ramírez, co-founder of Alianza Nacional de Campesinas. Though many praised this choice as an opportunity to lend voices to prominent activists in the field, others heavily criticized these and other actresses for showcasing activists of color as moral accessories. In an interview with Variety, however, Burke herself commented that once she received an invitation from Michelle Williams to attend the awards, she thought this choice was "brilliant".

In January 2020, Tara Reade, who a year prior accused Joe Biden of inappropriate touching, sought assistance from Time's Up with making public her claim of sexual assault by the former vice president. In February she was informed by the organization that taking her case would threaten their tax-exempt status given that he was running for office. In late March 2020, said she felt "betrayed" by Time's Up after the organization failed to inform her of their connections with the Biden campaign before she revealed to them the details of her allegation. She saw payments by the Biden campaign to Time's Up as "a way to silence [her] further from getting [her] story heard".

In January 2020, Oprah Winfrey, a founding donor, announced that she would be withdrawing as an executive producer of On The Record, a documentary about the accusers of Russell Simmons. Shortly afterward, Time's Up Now and Time's Up Legal Defense Fund (TULDF) were asked to sign a letter of support for the accusers; TULDF signed the letter, but Time's Up Now refused to. According to The Hollywood Reporter, many in the industry saw the organization's alignment with Winfrey as evidence of "an inherent conflict of interest — that the group is largely funded by Hollywood power brokers." This is a criticism that has been leveled at Time's Up Now since its inception in 2017.

Employees of Time's Up have criticized the organization for the portion of its funds spent on executive salaries. According to an April 2021 report from The Daily Beast, employees have criticized the organization's leadership for their "deference to powerful political allies."

=== Andrew Cuomo sexual misconduct allegations ===
On August 9, 2021, Time's Up chairwoman Roberta Kaplan resigned after an investigative report describing the allegations that then-New York governor Andrew Cuomo had sexually harassed women said she was involved in an effort to discredit former Cuomo aide Lindsey Boylan, the first of numerous women to accuse Cuomo of sexual misconduct. An investigation by New York Attorney General Letitia James stated that Kaplan had reviewed an unpublished op-ed letter attacking one of the women who had alleged harassment by Cuomo. These allegations caused Time's Up CEO Tina Tchen to resign on August 26, 2021.

Later, on September 10, 2021, Time's Up dissolved its entire advisory board and announced that all of the governing board members would resign and be replaced over 30 days. Variety described the group as being "in freefall" ever since the release of the state attorney general's investigation into Cuomo's alleged sexual misconduct and harassment. In November 2021, interim president and CEO Monifa Bandele stood down and Time's Up said it would replace all its current staff at the start of 2022.

In addition, Lisa Blau, a founding member and leader of the TIME'S UP Care Economy Business Council and Co-Founder of Able Partners, a venture capital firm that has backed multiple female founders, alongside her husband Jeff Blau, CEO of Related, mobilized New York’s real estate elite to back Andrew Cuomo against Zohran Mamdani in the NYC Mayoral Race. She co-authored an urgent email framing Cuomo as the only candidate with the “experience, support and gravitas” to defeat Mamdani and convened a rapid strategy meeting of developers and financiers, making no mention of the sexual harassment allegations he faced. This behind-the-scenes organizing helped channel money and influence into Cuomo’s campaign as a counterweight to Mamdani’s grassroots surge.

== Organization ==
Tina Tchen was until August 2021 the president and CEO of both Time's Up Now, a 501(c)4 social welfare organization, and Time's Up Foundation, a 501(c)3 public charity. Board members include Nina Shaw, Eva Longoria, Katie McGrath, Shonda Rhimes, and Jurnee Smollett. Former board members include Kaplan.

The Time's Up Legal Defense Fund (TULDF) was co-founded by Kaplan and Tchen and is operated separately by the National Women's Law Center which both houses and administers the fund. TULDF's director is Sharyn Tejani. The fund provides legal and media support to individuals who have been subject to workplace sex discrimination, such as sexual harassment. The TULDF initiative is funded by direct donations and through donations to the Time's Up Foundation. The initial fundraising GoFundMe campaign for the legal defense fund in 2018 received $21 million in two months. The New York Times called the TULDF "[Time's Up]'s crown jewel."

Time's Up has also formed and oversees several industry-specific groups: Time's Up Entertainment, Time's Up Tech, Time's Up Advertising, and Time's Up Healthcare.

As of January 2020, the organization had raised $24 million in donations.

== See also ==
- Him Too movement
