= Joanie Leeds =

American musician (born 1978)

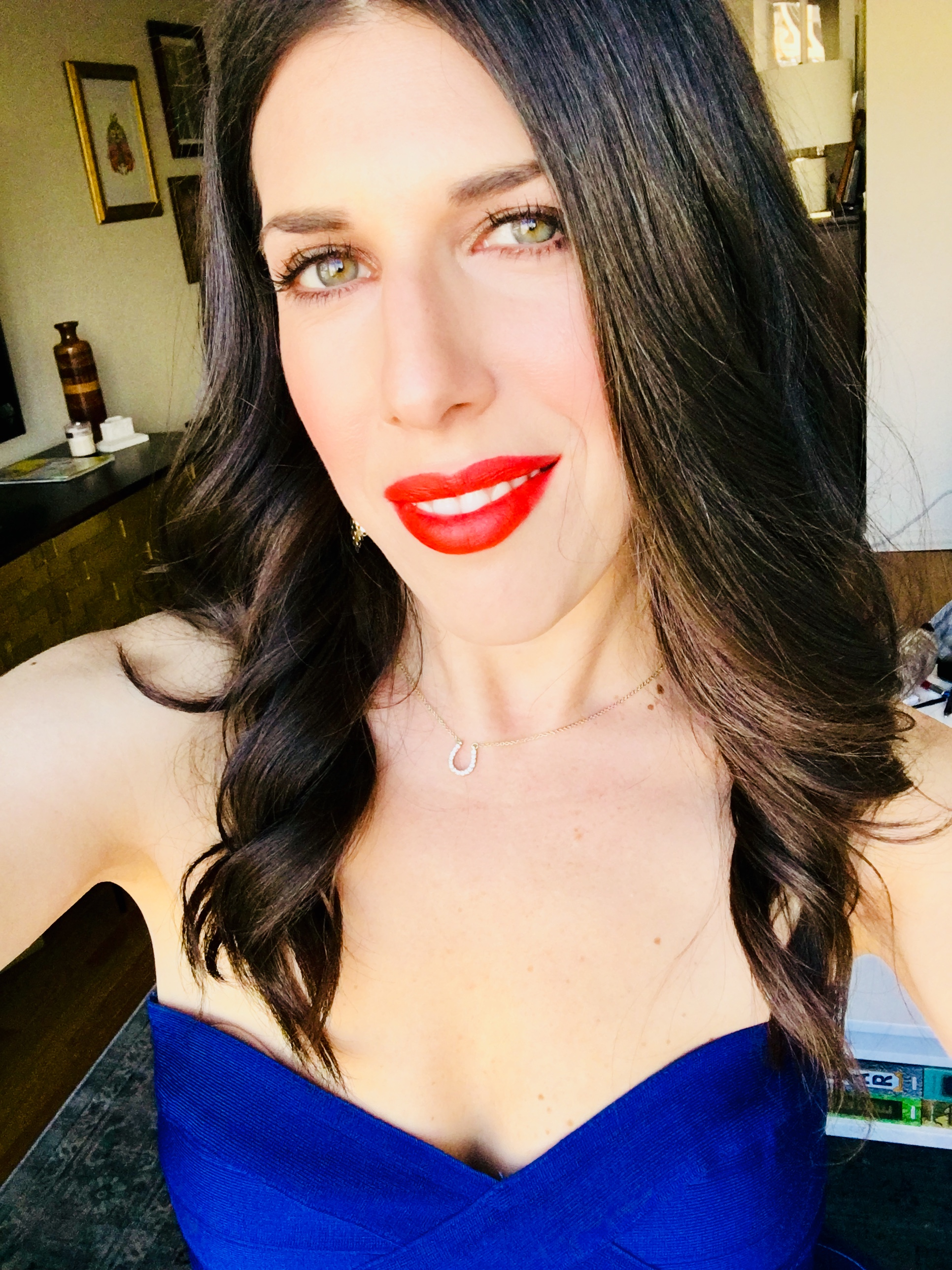
- Born: Joan Leibowitz; October 1, 1978 (age 47); Miami, Florida
- Occupation: Musician
- Awards: Grammy
- Website: www.joanieleeds.com

Joanie Leeds (born Joan Leibowitz; October 1978) is a Grammy-award winning musician best known for her work as a children's musical artist.

== Early life and education ==
Growing up in Miami, Florida in a Jewish family, Leeds took voice lessons as a child and was involved in school choirs and musical theater performances throughout her high school years. She taught herself how to play guitar and began song-leading at her summer camp and youth group conventions. As a musical theater and drama major at Syracuse University's College of Visual and Performing Arts, she began writing her own original music and recorded her first album her senior year of college. In 2000, she recorded her first full-length CD, My Job Application Knows More about Me Than You Do, while finishing her senior year of Syracuse.

== Career ==
After graduating, she moved to New York City and took a bartending job at the Greenwich Village music club, The Bitter End. Leeds sang with her band as a professional rock musician. She started her own record label, Limbostar, along with her own publishing company through BMI, Zameret Music.

For 7 years, Leeds sang in clubs such as The Living Room, CBGB's Gallery, Arlene's Grocery, The Bitter End and many others. In 2003 she recorded Soul From My Footsteps produced by Richard Furch and Chris Benelli. "Joanie tried her hand at about ten different day gigs (Real Estate Agent, Miramax Films Casting Assistant, Epic Records PR assistant) until a friend suggested that she get a job where she could sing with kids during the day and perhaps sleep at night. You could say that Joanie found (as in 'discovered') herself, managing one of the Manhattan Gymboree Play & Music locations and singing with and for kids all day long. The nocturnal club scene was fun, but making music with children was real fun".

In 2006, she began working and singing at Gymboree Play & Music and managed the Upper West Side location. Inspired by the children in her classes, she began writing music for kids and shortly after left Gymboree to start her own birthday party business singing her original songs. With some of her musician friends, Harris Cohen, Brad Levy, Ben Whetsel, Ben Elkin and producer/mixer/engineer Kelly E. Harnett, she put out her first children's album, City Kid, which won a Parents' Choice Award. The album contained original songs like "Sushi" and "Blast Off", along with covers of "Our House" and Otis Redding's "Happy Song".

In 2009, Leeds performed gigs in NYC, Los Angeles, Miami, Baltimore, The Hamptons, Memphis, Nashville, Asheville (NC), Cleveland (GA), and Washington, DC. She was a guest on radio shows in Miami and Nashville and appeared on Good Morning Maryland (WMAR/ABC-TV, Baltimore) and she released two music videos to YouTube". She also co-wrote a Jewgrass (Jewish Bluegrass) album with friend and banjo player Matthew Check and released Challah, Challah in September 2009.

In 2010, Leeds released a full length DVD, City Kid Live directed by Miami-based Emmy Award-winning editor and director, AJ Nichols. It includes 3 music videos, a live concert and bonus features. Also released in 2010 is her second album, I'm a Rock Star, which features the Saturday Night Live inspired parody "More Cowbell" and the environmentally friendly, "I Wanna Be Green". I'm A Rock Star was recorded in Nashville, Tennessee in the summer of 2009 with Zodlounge Music, a music production company. The title track was awarded a finalist position in The John Lennon Songwriting Contest and she was awarded an Independent Music Award for best children's song.

Following the success of I'm a Rock Star, Leeds quickly released What a Zoo, an animal themed CD which stand out tracks such as "Happy As a Clam" and "Tofurky" became frequently played on the radio stations such as XM/Sirius Satellite. "Tofurky" was also used by the Tofurky company as their official theme song for the Thanksgiving holiday. Another Parent's Choice award and a NAPPA Gold Award (National Parenting Publications Award) were given for songs from this album. "Happy As a Clam" was a finalist in the International Songwriting Competition and People and Parents magazines both listed What a Zoo as their top children's CD of 2011.

Leeds's next album, Bandwagon was released in June 2013. In November 2013, Leeds & The Nightlights took first place in the Children’s Category of the USA Songwriting Competition. In 2014, Leeds released Good Egg and in 2015 Leeds gave birth to a baby daughter along with releasing an album of Jewish themed songs, Meshugana, and a DVD titled Joanie Leeds & The Nightlights- Live from Madison Square Park. In 2017 Leeds released her 8th album for children, Brooklyn Baby! and in the same year coincidentally, she moved out of Brooklyn and back to Manhattan upon separating from her husband.

In 2018, Leeds started a new musical project with her Challah, Challah co-writer, Matthew Check, titled Joanie and Matt The songwriting duo team up this time to write and record a Folksy-Americana album interpreting ancient texts with a modern and feminist twist. They funded their debut album on Kickstarter and it was released in December, 2018.

Leeds's 9th children's album, All the Ladies, was released to critical acclaim on April 3, 2020. Lucy Kalantari produced the all-female concept album which featured Leeds's original songs about female empowerment and gender equality. Songs include RBG, a song about Justice Ruth Bader Ginsburg and the title track, All the Ladies, which is sung by Leeds and Lisa Loeb. All the Ladies won the Grammy Award at the 63rd Annual Grammy Awards for Best Children's Album.

Joanie's 10th album, Oy Vey! Another Christmas Album, released in November 2022 and was co-written by collaborator and friend, Fyütch. Leeds had the idea to musically celebrate the Jewish songwriters who have written some of the best Christmas songs. Fyütch produced the album and the two co-wrote the originals and chose the classic remakes: "Winter Wonderland" Felix Bernard & Richard Bernhard Smith, "The Christmas Song (Chestnuts Roasting on an open Fire)" by Mel Torme, "Little Drummer Boy" by Harry Simeone, Katherine K Davis, Henry V. Onorati and "I'll Be Home for Christmas" by Walter Kent; Buck Ram & Kim Gannon.

Leeds' latest album, fREADom' tackles book bans in America and shines a light on the injustice of censorship and silencing marginalized communities. Each song is inspired by a different banned children's picture books and features the Book Band (Regina Carter, Divinity Roxx, SaulPaul, Oran Etkin & Cheryl B. Engelhardt) as well as several guest artists. In conjunction with the album, Joanie was asked to write an OpEd for Billboard Magazine.

== Live performances ==
Leeds tour at national venues across the country such as Austin City Limits, Lollapalooza, Clearwater Festival, The Kennedy Center, Lincoln Center, The Levitt Pavilion, Wolf Trap, Filene Center, Adrienne Arsht Center for the Performing Arts, Skirball Cultural Center, Ladies Who Rock 4 A Cause Music Festival and Symphony Space and her music is often played on radio stations such as SiriusXM and WXPN.

== Discography ==
=== Studio albums ===
- 'My Job Application Knows More About Me Than You Do' (2000)
- 'Soul From My Footsteps' (2003)
- 'City Kid' (2008)
- 'Challah, Challah' (2009)
- 'I'm a Rock Star' (2010)
- 'What a Zoo' (2011)
- 'Bandwagon' (2013)
- 'Good Egg' (2014)
- 'Meshugana' (2015)
- 'Brooklyn Baby!' (2017)
- 'Sterling' (2019) - Leeds & Matt
- 'All the Ladies' (2020)
- 'Oy Vey! Another Christmas Album' (2022)
- 'fREADom' (2023)
- 'Ageless: 100 Years Young' (2025)

=== Singles ===
RBG (2020) Endless Summer (2021) Under the Same Stars (2021) Like A Maccabee (2021) Winter Wonderland (2021) Till Midnight (2021) A Snowflake's Lament (2023) Fauci Ouchie (2022) Every Day's a Holiday (2022) If Girls Ruled the World REMIX (2023) Broadway is My Favorite Sport (2023)

=== DVDs ===
- 'City Kid Live' (2010)
- 'Joanie Leeds & The Nightlights- Live from Madison Square Park' (2015)
