= Men of Athens =

1962 book by Olivia Coolidge

- Author: Olivia Coolidge
- Illustrator: Milton Johnson
- Language: English
- Genre: Historical fiction
- Publisher: Houghton Mifflin
- Publication date: 1962
- Publication place: United States
- Media type: Print
- Pages: 244
- ISBN: 0395067278

Men of Athens is a 1962 young adult historical fiction book by author Olivia Coolidge. It consists of short stories about the men who lived during the Golden Age of Greece. It received a Newbery Honor Award in 1963. It also won the Horn Book Fanfare award.

== Awards ==
- Newbery Honor in 1963
- Horn Book Award
