= Lucy Kalantari =

American singer, composer and producer

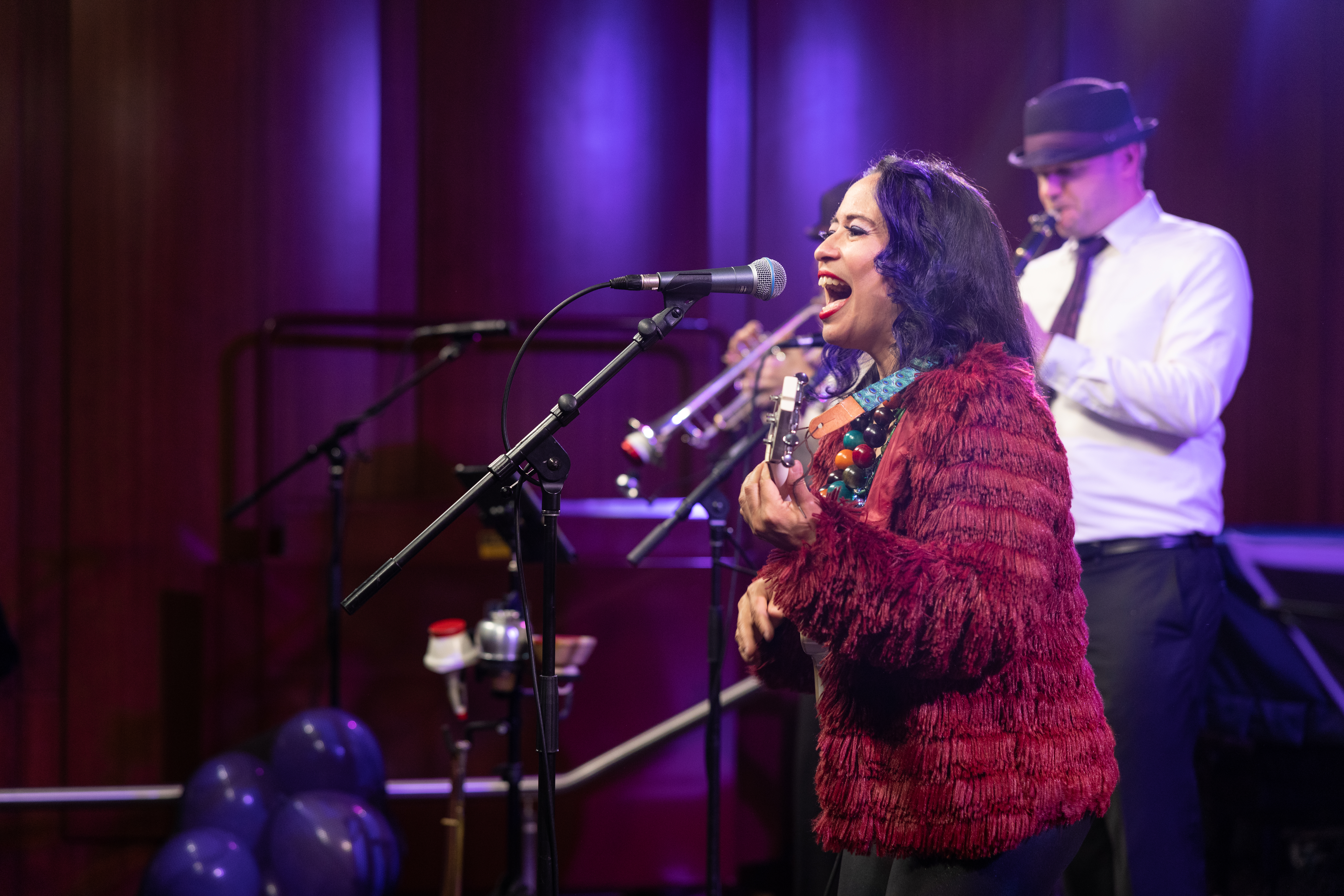
- Lucy Kalantari performing live in 2023.

Background information
- Born: United States
- Genres: Children's music, Jazz
- Occupations: Singer-songwriter, Composer, Producer
- Instrument: Vocals
- Years active: 2014–present
- Website: lucykalantari.com

Lucy Kalantari is a Grammy winning American singer, composer and producer. She is the frontwoman and bandleader for Lucy Kalantari and The Jazz Cats.

== Early life ==
Born in the United States to a Dominican mother and a Puerto Rican father, Kalantari grew up in a Spanish-speaking household. She graduated from the Purchase Conservatory of Music (commonly known as State University of New York at Purchase) in 1998, where she studied studio composition and production.

== Career ==
In 2014, Kalantari released her first children's music album, Pockets Full of Joy, after having her first child.

In 2016, she released her second album, Big Things. The opening track of that album, "Fantastic", won the "Children's Music" category at the 15th Independent Music Awards. The song "It's Halloween" was nominated in the "Holiday Song" category, and the album Big Things for the "Children's Album" category. The album also won Fall 2016 Parents' Choice Awards.

Kalantari released her third album, It's the Holidays!, in 2017, which was included in the 2017 Christmas album roundup on Los Angeles Times and salutes Halloween, Thanksgiving, Christmas, Hanukkah, Kwanzaa, and New Year's.

Her fourth album, All The Sounds, released in 2018, won the Grammy Award for Best Children's Album at the 61st Grammy Awards, and earned a Top 10 Music spot on School Library Journal. All the Sounds includes “La Cosecha,” a celebratory tribute to community gardening, and a Piazzolla-style tango, “Howl to the Moon,” for Halloween.

Kalantari has appeared on TV shows including Snug's House (formerly Sprout House) on Universal Kids, and has performed at The Levitt Pavilion, Wolf Trap, and Lollapalooza's Kidzapalooza.

In June 2020, “She Can Do,” a song that celebrates breaking down gender-based stereotypes and features Kalantari in a vocal performance, was included on the “My Earth Songs” album to benefit UNICEF.

Lucy Kalantari produced the 2020 Joanie Leeds album, All the Ladies, earning her second GRAMMY when All the Ladies won the Grammy Award for Best Children's Album at the 63rd Grammy Awards.

== Discography ==
=== Studio albums ===
- Pockets Full of Joy (2014)
- Big Things (2016)
- It's the Holidays! (2017)
- All the Sounds (2018)

=== Singles ===
- Balloon (2016)
- Fantástica (2017)
- My Mommy is a Mummy (2017)
- Sounds of Summer (2018)
- Flick of My Wrist (2019)
- Do You Know How Long? (2020)
- ¿Cuánto tiempo toma? (2020)
- Haunting Days of Halloween (2020)
- What Kind of World? (featuring Syreeta Thompson) (2021)
