= Tina Tchen =

American lawyer (born 1956)

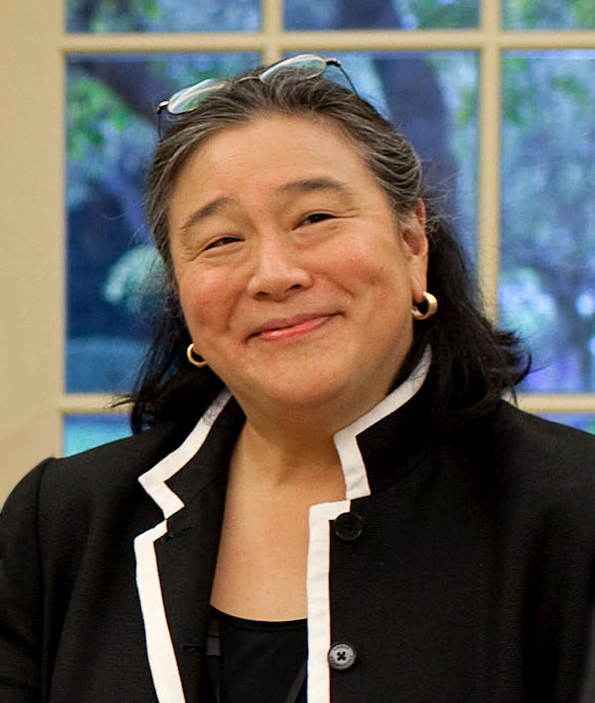
- Tchen in 2009

Chief of Staff to the First Lady of the United States
- In office January 5, 2011 – January 20, 2017
- President: Barack Obama
- First Lady: Michelle Obama
- Preceded by: Susan Sher
- Succeeded by: Lindsay Reynolds

Director of the Office of Public Engagement
- In office January 20, 2009 – January 5, 2011
- President: Barack Obama
- Preceded by: Julie E. Cram (Public Liaison)
- Succeeded by: Jon Carson

Personal details
- Born: January 25, 1956 (age 70) Columbus, Ohio, U.S.
- Party: Democratic
- Spouse: Larry Pressl (divorced)
- Education: Harvard University (BA); Northwestern University (JD)

Christina M. "Tina" Tchen (born January 25, 1956) is an American lawyer and a former official in the President Barack Obama Administration. She was CEO of Time's Up from 2019 to 2021.

== Early life and education ==
Tchen was born in Columbus, Ohio, on January 25, 1956, to Chinese immigrants of Shanghainese descent who fled the People's Republic of China in 1949. Her father Peter Chou-Yen Tchen worked as a psychiatrist and her mother Lily was a scientist (chemistry from Syracuse University). In 1956, her father was facing deportation back to China but received help from Ohio Senator John Bricker. She grew up in Beachwood, Ohio, graduating from Beachwood High School in 1974. She graduated from Radcliffe College of Harvard University in 1978, and received her J.D. degree in 1984 from Northwestern University School of Law.

== Career ==
Tchen worked for several years for the Illinois Bureau of the Budget where she served as the Governor's budget analyst for the Department of Children and Family Services. In 1988, Tchen began as an associate at Skadden, Arps, Slate, Meagher & Flom, later becoming a partner at the firm in 1992, where she specialized in litigation in the federal courts. In 1992, she argued on behalf of the State of Illinois in front of the Supreme Court of the United States in Artist M. v. Suter, which helped reform the state's foster care program by closing a loophole.

During President Obama's campaign in 2008, Tchen was one of his biggest fundraisers, raising $200,000. From Obama's inauguration in 2009 until January 5, 2011, she was the Director of the White House Office of Public Engagement, previously known as the Office of Public Liaison. From 2011 until 2017, she served as Assistant to President Barack Obama; Chief of Staff to First Lady Michelle Obama; and Executive Director of the White House Council on Women and Girls.

In 2017, she became a partner in the law firm Buckley Sander where she led the workplace culture practice and was head of the firm's Chicago office. In 2018, she was one of the co-founders of Time's Up and led its legal defense fund that connected victims of sexual harassment with lawyers. The fund has raised more than $24 million by 2019 and has connected more than 3,600 workers in various industries to legal support for sexual harassment cases.

In March 2019, Tchen was hired as an adviser to investigate the Southern Poverty Law Center's (SPLC) "workplace culture" after allegations of sexual and racial harassment led to the firing of the SPLC's co-founder and resignation of its president. Also that year, she was named chair of the Recording Academy's new task force for inclusion and diversity following Neil Portnow and Ken Ehrlich's disparaging comments about women in the music industry.

On October 7, 2019, Tchen was appointed chief executive officer of Time's Up. Tchen's leadership has come under scrutiny amid revelations of assisting prominent Democratic politicians Andrew Cuomo and Joe Biden about the response to women who were publicly accusing them of sexual misconduct. She resigned on August 26, 2021, in the wake of Cuomo's resignation when it was revealed Tchen worked with the governor to discredit his first accuser.

== Awards and recognition ==
- Chicago Lawyer "Person of the Year", 1994
- "Women of Achievement" award from the Anti-Defamation League, 1996
- Leadership Award from the Women's Bar Association of Illinois, 1999
- American Bar Association's Margaret Brent Women Lawyers of Achievement Award, 2018

== Boards and commissions ==
- Chicago Bar Association Foundation
- Chicago Public Library (trustee)
- Chinese American Service League (board member)
- Judicial Nominations Commission for the Northern District of Illinois

Political offices
Preceded by Julie E. Cram as Director of the Office of Public Liaison	Director of the Office of Public Engagement; 2009–2011; Served alongside: Valerie Jarrett (Public Engagement and Intergovernmental Affairs)	Succeeded by Jon Carson
