= Fatima Goss Graves =

American lawyer

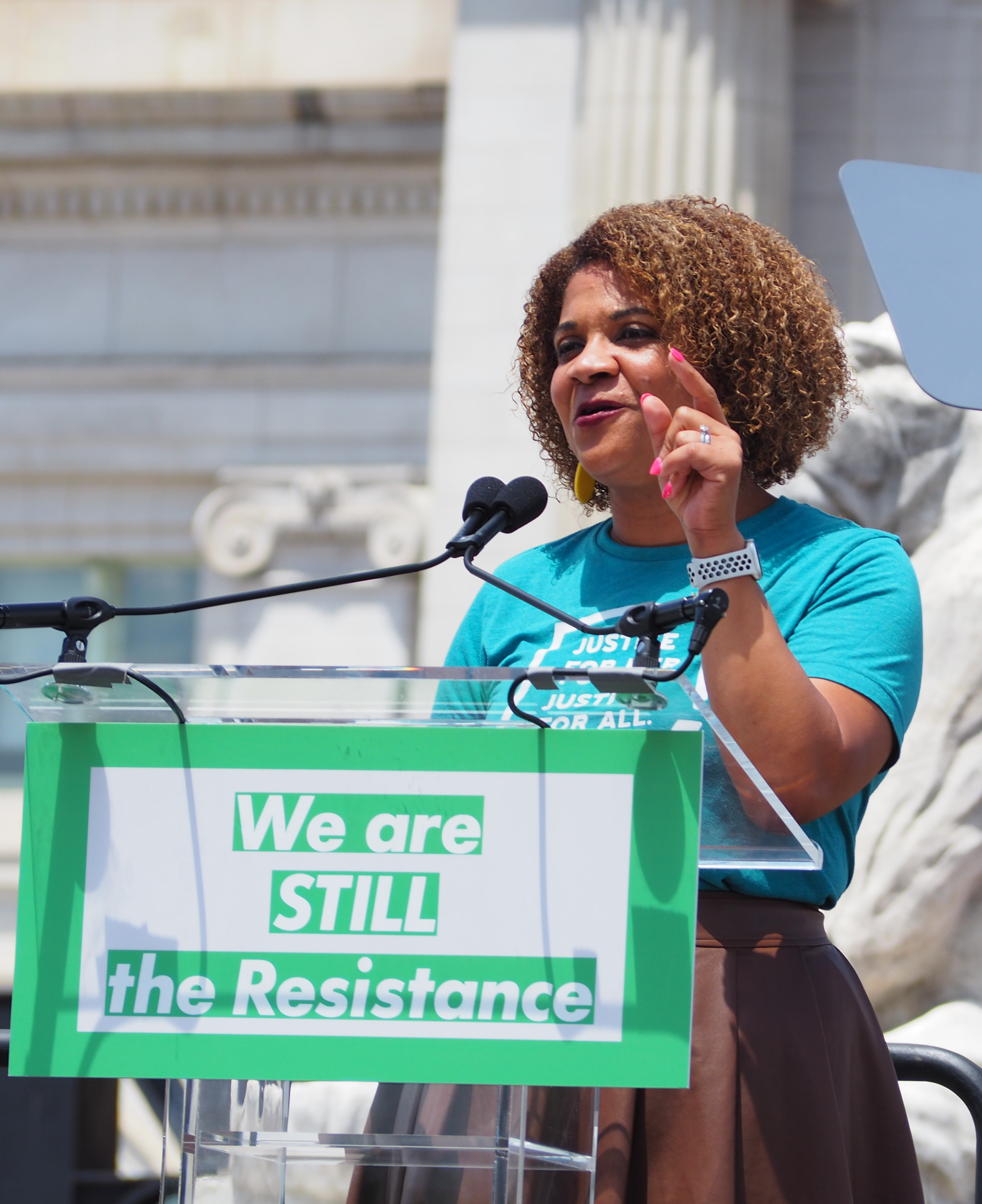
Image of Fatima Goss Graves

Fatima Goss Graves is an American lawyer. She is the president and chief executive officer at the National Women's Law Center. She is one of the co-founders of the Time's Up Legal Defense Fund.
