= Marcia Greenberger =

American lawyer

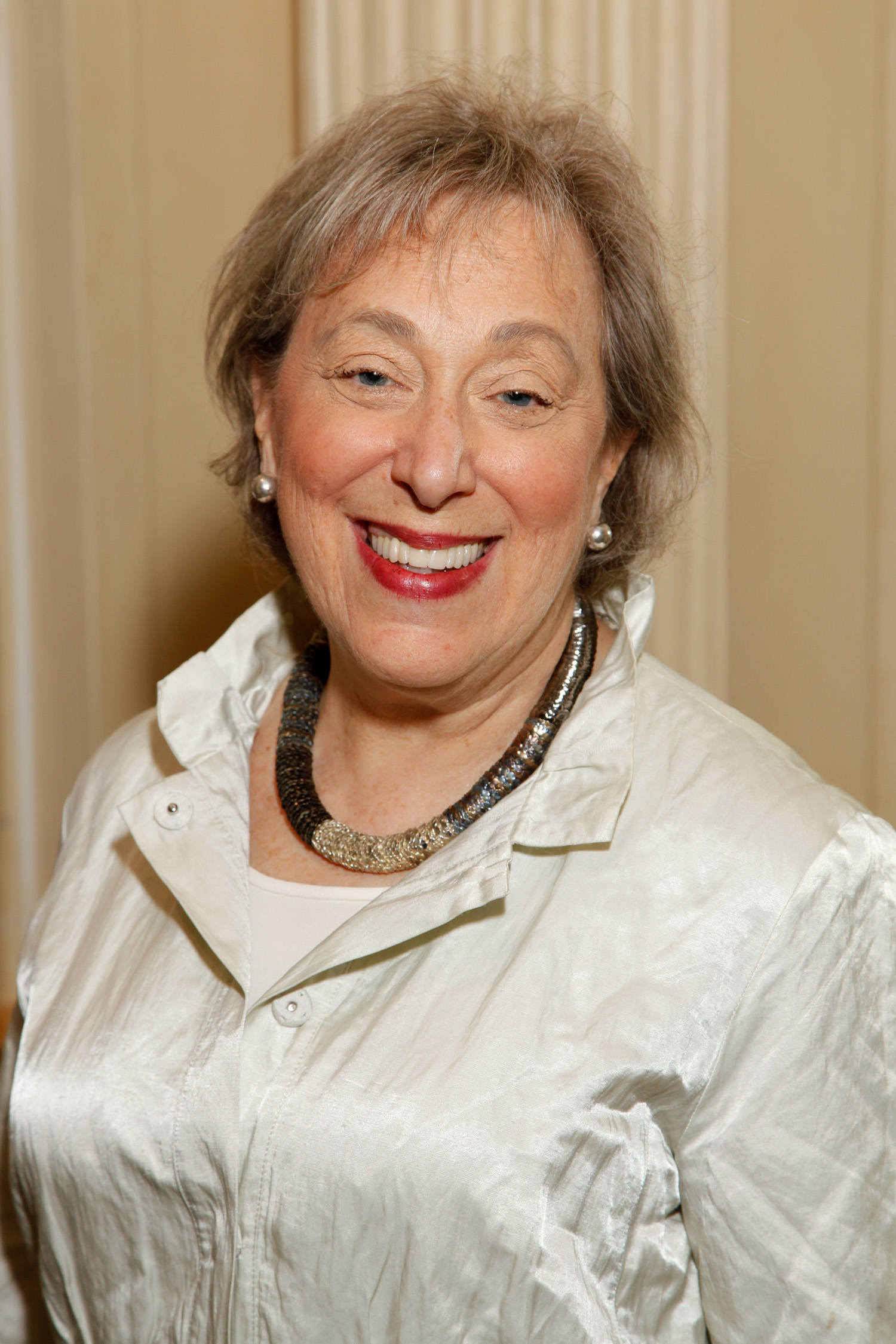
Marcia Greenberger, at Women’s eNews’ 21 Leaders for the 21st Century for 2012.

Marcia D. Greenberger (born 1946) is an American women's rights attorney.

== Early life and education ==
Marcia Greenberger was born April 24, 1946 to a Jewish family in Philadelphia, Pennsylvania, where she grew up.

Greenberger received her B.A. with honors and J.D. cum laude from the University of Pennsylvania.

== Career ==
Greenberger was the first female attorney at the tax law firm of Caplin and Drysdale, a Washington DC firm founded by Mortimer Caplin, a former Commissioner of Internal Revenue. Her interest in tax law faded as she became the firm's representative to two civil rights groups, the Lawyers' Committee for Civil Rights Under Law and the Washington Lawyers' Committee for Civil Rights and Urban Affairs.

In addition, she began working with former associate justice of the Supreme Court Arthur Goldberg, who had his own practice in the firm's offices and encouraged Greenberger to join the Center for Law and Social Policy.

She co-founded the National Women's Law Center in 1981 with Nancy Duff Campbell, where they served as co-presidents until 2017 when both retired. The National Women's Law Center was founded by them to fight for gender equality in economic security, education, health, and jobs. It began when female administrative staff and law students at the Center for Law and Social Policy demanded that their pay be improved, that the center hire female lawyers, that they no longer be expected to serve coffee, and that the center create a women's program. Greenberger was hired in 1972 to start the program and Campbell joined her in 1978. In 1981, the two decided to turn the program into the separate National Women's Law Center.

In 2015 Greenberger was inducted into the National Women's Hall of Fame.

She is married to Michael Greenberger.
