= Buckley LLP =

American law firm

- Headquarters: Washington, DC, United States
- No. of offices: 6
- No. of attorneys: 160
- Date founded: March 2009
- Company type: Limited liability partnership
- Dissolved: February 1, 2023 (merger with Orrick, Herrington & Sutcliffe)
- Website: www.buckleyfirm.com

Buckley LLP, formerly known as BuckleySandler, was a financial services, criminal, and civil enforcement defense law firm which had over one hundred lawyers in different parts of the United States of America; in Washington, D.C., New York, San Francisco, Los Angeles, Chicago, and in London. As of February 1, 2023, Buckley merged with global law firm Orrick, Herrington & Sutcliffe.

== History ==
The firm was founded in 2009 by Jeremiah Buckley and Andrew Sandler as a consumer financial services boutique law firm with 40 lawyers. In the wake of the 2008 financial crisis and the passage of the 2010 Dodd–Frank Act, the firm tripled in size to 130 attorneys by 2011. In 2019, the firm rebranded to Buckley LLP following Sandler's departure from the firm. The firm focused primarily on financial services regulation, banking law, and white-collar criminal defense. The firm represented large financial institutions, government entities, and corporate clients.

== National rankings and recognition ==
In 2014, Law360 named BuckleySandler a "consumer protection practice group of the year". In 2018, U.S. News & World Report ranked BuckleySandler among the best law firms as a National Tier 1 law firm for financial services litigation and financial services regulation. It was ranked as a National Tier 2 law firm for banking and finance law. That year, Chambers and Partners recognized BuckleySandler with practice rankings.
