= Adrianne Calvo =

American chef and television personality

- Born: 1984 (age 41–42); Chicago, Illinois, U.S.
- Education: Johnson & Wales University
- Culinary career
- Cooking style: American
- Current restaurants
- Chef Adrianne's Vineyard Restaurant and Wine Bar (2007–); Cracked Eatery (2019–)
- Website: www.adriannecalvo.com

Adrianne Calvo (born 1984) is an American chef and television personality.

== Early life ==
Calvo was born in Chicago, Illinois, in 1984.

== Career ==
In 2002, Calvo enrolled at the culinary school Johnson & Wales University. Receiving first place in some culinary competitions gave her the opportunity to cater the 2003 World Series for the champions Florida Marlins.

In 2004, Calvo started to work at the Mandarin Oriental Hotel in Miami, where she worked with chef Patrick Lassaque. After working at Mandarin Oriental, Calvo worked with Thomas Keller and Cindy Pawlcyn.

Calvo has participated in the Food Network's South Beach Wine and Food Festival for the past four years as well as events such as Dali Miami and Miami Beach International Fashion Week.

=== Restaurants ===
In April 2007, Calvo opened her restaurant, Chef Adrianne's Vineyard Restaurant and Wine Bar in Miami. In August 2019, Calvo turned her food truck into a brick-and-mortar restaurant called the Cracked Eatery in Miami.

=== Awards ===
In 2013, Calvo won the Master Holiday Chef Challenge

In 2015 "Chef Adrianne's Vineyard Restaurant and Wine Bar" was selected as one of the 17 most important restaurants in Miami by Thrillist. It was also named one of the U.S.'s 15 most unique restaurants by Zagat in 2016

In 2018, Calvo was named Miami's Best Chef by the New Times.

== Books ==
- Maximum Flavor (2005)
- Chef Adrianne: Driven by Flavor, Fueled by Fire (2008)
- MaximumFlavorSocial (2014)
- Play With Fire (2015)
- The A-List (2018)
