= Olivia Coolidge =

British American historical writer

Margaret Olivia Ensor Coolidge (October 16, 1908 − December 10, 2006) was a British-born American writer and educator. She published 27 books, many for young adults, including The Greek Myths (1949), her debut; The Trojan War (1952); Legends of the North (1951); Makers of the Red Revolution (1963); Men of Athens, one runner-up for the 1963 Newbery Medal; Lives of Famous Romans (1965); and biographies of Eugene O'Neill, Winston Churchill, Edith Wharton, Gandhi, and Tom Paine. Olivia Coolidge was born in London to Sir Robert Ensor, a journalist and historian. She earned a degree in Classics and Philosophy at Somerville College, Oxford, in 1931 and a Master's degree in 1940. In Germany, England and the U.S. she taught Greek, Latin, and English. In 1946 she married Archibald C. Coolidge of Connecticut, who had four children.
