= Adrianne Harun =

American writer of prose

Adrianne Harun is an American writer of prose. She is the author of two story collections, The King of Limbo (Overlook Press, Houghton Mifflin) and Catch, Release (Johns Hopkins University Press), which was the Grand Prize winner of the Eric Hoffer Award. Her debut novel, A Man Came Out of a Door in the Mountain (a book about "where evil comes from", according to the author), was published by Penguin in 2014. Claire Vaye Watkins called the book a "breathless, absorbing novel" in a New York Times review, and the book received glowing reviews elsewhere as well, with one reviewer describing it as the "buzz book of the season". That novel was long-listed for the Internatinal Dublin Literary Award, a finalist for both the Pacific Northwest Booksellers Award and the Washington State Book Award and winner of a Pinckley Prize for Debut Crime Fiction. Her latest novel, On the Way to the End of the World (Acre Books/University of Chicago Press), is a mystery set over the course of a 50-mile Kennedy Walk in 1963.
