= Syreeta Thompson =

American musician and composer

- Born: Syreeta Thompson; Chicago, Illinois, U.S.
- Genres: Jazz
- Occupations: Trumpeter; producer; arranger; filmmaker; writer; music educator
- Instrument: Trumpet
- Years active: 2000–present
- Website: trumpetlady.com

Syreeta Thompson is an American trumpeter, music producer, music arranger, filmmaker, writer, and music educator. She has had two Billboard charting albums, was nominated for a Stellar Music Award, and has recorded and performed with such artists as Beyoncé, Hezekiah Walker, Lucy Kalantari, Dorinda Clark Cole, and others. She directed and performed in the documentary Blow Yo Horn, Making it in a Man's World.

== Early life and education ==
Syreeta Thompson was born and raised in Chicago, Illinois. Her father, a jazz musician, was murdered when she was four years old, and she was raised by her mother. She began playing the trumpet at 12 years old and played in her church choir. She attended the Merit Music Program and Sherwood Conservatory of Music in Chicago, Illinois. Thompson received her Bachelor's in Arts degree at Douglass College and her master's degree in film scoring, jazz composition, and arranging at Rutgers University.

== Career ==
Thompson is a classically trained trumpeter, composer, music producer, and music arranger. She has recorded and performed with such artists as Hezekiah Walker, Lucy Kalantari and has shared the stage with Rachel York, Nicole Zuraitis, and Charu Suri, among others. In 2016, her album Trumpet Lady charted at #4 on Billboard's Top Gospel Albums as well as peaking at #6 on Billboard's Jazz Album Chart that same year.

She was nominated for a Stellar Award for Instrumental CD of the Year for Gabriel's Praise in 2008 as well as well as being nominated for a Hollywood Music in Media Award for Best Jazz Song in 2017. As a film director, Thompson directed Blow Yo Horn, Making it in a Man's World.

Thompson is the instrumental music coordinator for Dorinda Clark Cole’s National Singers and Musicians Conference and has been a speaker at SXSW and the Berklee College of Music’s City Music Summit.
