= Adrianne Frost =

American comedian, author, and actress (born 1978)

- Born: Lincoln, Nebraska
- Occupations: comedian, author, and actress
- Website: www.adriannefrost.net

Adrianne Frost is an American comedian, author, and actress. She is best known for her work on Comedy Central's The Daily Show and VH1's Best Week Ever.

== Early life ==
Frost was born in Lincoln, Nebraska and grew up in Louisiana. She attended the University of Southwestern Louisiana.

== Career ==
In 2002, she became a correspondent on The Daily Show, leaving the show later that year. In 2004, she became a panelist on Best Week Ever, and stayed until 2007. In 2006, she published her first book I Hate Other People's Kids. She was included in the Signet Book of American Humor in 2004 and in Rejected: Tales of The Failed Dumped and Canceled in 2009.

She appeared on Nurse Jackie, Law & Order, Law and Order: Criminal Intent, Law and Order: SVU, 30 Rock, and Late Night with Conan O'Brien. Adrianne made her feature film debut in Ticking Clock. She was featured in Bert and Arnie's Guide To Friendship, released in 2012,Lovehunter, released in 2013, and After Everything in 2018. Most recently, she appeared on CBS's Bull (Episode 17, "Name Game").

She was featured in over a dozen commercials.

Adrianne performs in Gong Show Live, playing drunken D-list actress Rhonda Smith Duffy Chorus.

She appeared on the NY stage performing improvisation, stand up and storytelling at Tribeca Y, the UCB Theatre, Caroline's Comedy Club, Gotham Comedy Club, The People's Improv Theatre and The Magnet. Outside of NY, she performed at the Chicago Improv Festival, Orlando's Foolfest, the Funny Women's Festival, Portland and Toronto Improv Festivals and at London's Pleasance Theatre.

== Recognition ==
- 7 time champion of the Manhattan Monologue Slam and was the Grand National Champion for 2010.
