= Nina Shaw =

American entertainment lawyer

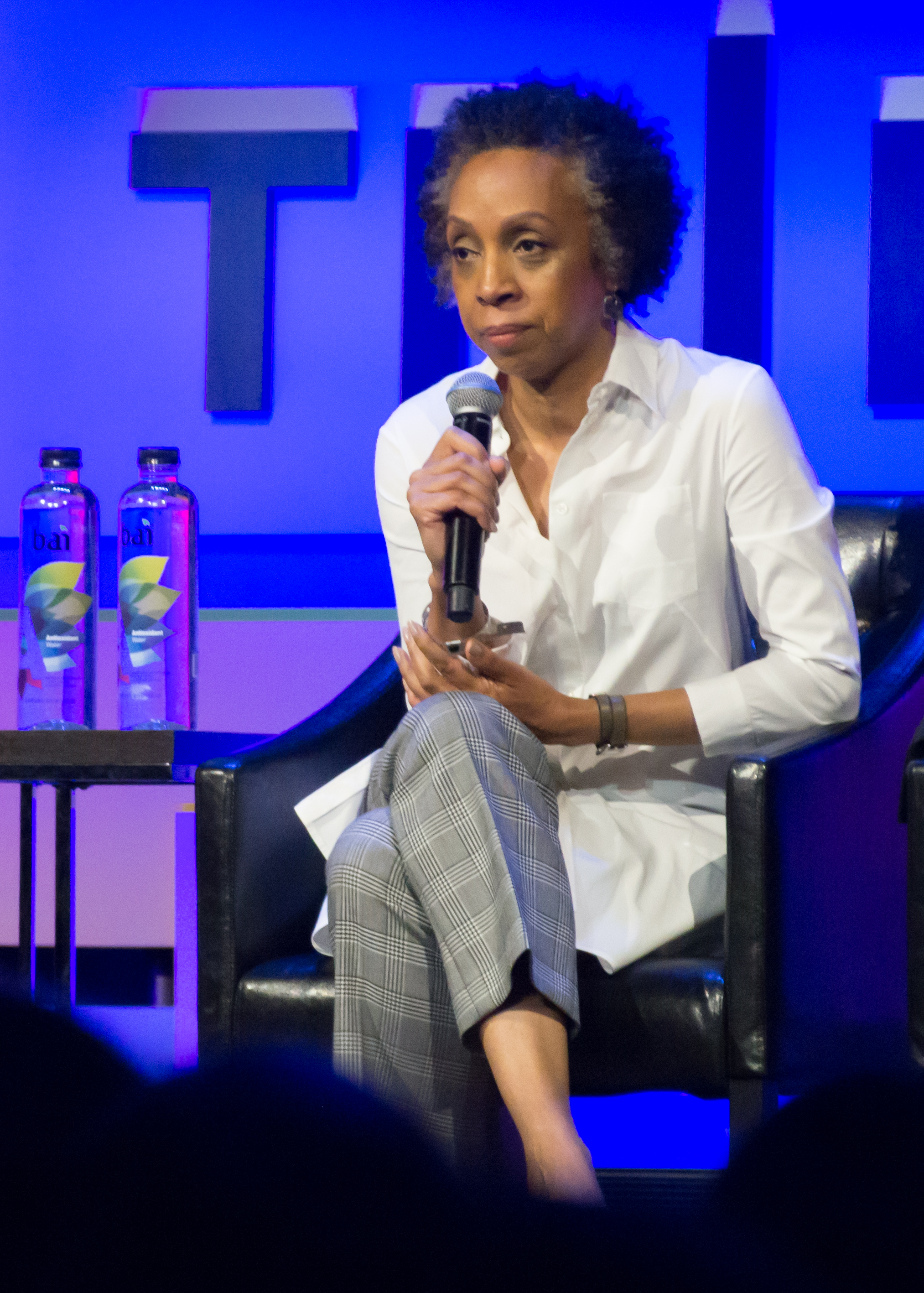
- Shaw speaking at the Tribeca Film Festival in 2018
- Born: New York City, U.S.
- Education: William Howard Taft High School; Barnard College (BA); Columbia University (JD)
- Occupation: Entertainment lawyer
- Children: 2

Nina L. Shaw is an American entertainment lawyer who is a partner at Del Shaw Moonves Tanaka Finkelstein and Lezcano Law Firm.

Women in Film gave her the Crystal Award in 2005 for her work in entertainment, which was "a testament to her distinction among Hollywood's movers and shakers". In 2013, the Beverly Hills Bar Association named Shaw the Entertainment Attorney of the Year. Shaw was recognized in 2011 by The Hollywood Reporter's Women in Entertainment 2011: Power 100.

== Life ==
Shaw was born and raised in Harlem, New York. She also spent some time in The Bronx. Upon graduating from William Howard Taft High School, Shaw attended Barnard College, where she received her B.A. in 1976. She went on to Columbia Law School and earned her J.D. in 1979. Shaw is married, lives in Los Angeles with her husband and has two adult daughters. She is African-American. Shaw is on the Motion Picture & Television Fund (MPTF) Board of Directors. She also appeared in an episode of The A-Team (“Steel” in 1985) as a tourist.
