= Center for Law and Social Policy =

Nonprofit organization in Washington D.C., United States

- Abbreviation: CLASP
- Formation: August 1969; 57 years ago
- Type: 501(c)(3) organization
- Location: 1310 L St. NW, Washington, D.C. 20005
- Website: clasp.org

The Center for Law and Social Policy (CLASP) is a liberal organization, based in Washington, D.C., that engages in anti-poverty advocacy.

== Overview ==
The National Women's Law Center was established in 1972 as a project of CLASP.

Alan W. Houseman joined CLASP as executive director in 1981 and began shifting its focus from general public-interest law to anti-poverty policy, particularly child and family poverty.

After Houseman's retirement as executive director in 2013, Olivia Golden was chosen to lead the organization. She did so until 2022 when Indivar "Indi" Dutta-Gupta joined the organization as its executive director. Dutta-Gupta left CLASP in 2024, and Wendy Chun-Hoon became the organization's executive director in 2025.

The organization is a 501(c)(3) nonprofit organization funded by a number of foundations, including the Bill & Melinda Gates Foundation, the Ford Foundation, the W.K. Kellogg Foundation, the Atlantic Philanthropies, and various individual donors. In 2021, it reported an income of $12 million. In 2022, CLASP received a $10 million gift from MacKenzie Scott, the ex-wife of Jeff Bezos.
