= Judah b. Hiyya =

Judah b. Hiyya (or Judah be-rabbi or Yehudah b. Hiyya; Hebrew: יהודה בריה דרבי חייא or יהודה בן רבי חייא) was a Jewish Amora sage of the Land of Israel, during the transitional period between the Tannaic and Amoraic eras.

== Biography ==
He was the son of R. Hiyya and his wife Judith, and the twin brother of Hezekiah. He and his brother Hezekiah are often termed simply the "sons of Hiyya" or "the young people", although both were celebrated for their learning and piety. Shimon ben Lakish states that they left Babylonia with their father and went to Palestine, and spread learning there. They were known for their piety.

He is sometimes called "Rabbi", although it would seem that he was never ordained, since he is more frequently mentioned without this title.

It is told that he married the daughter of Rabbi Yannai. After he married, he went to study at a beth midrash all week, and would return home every Sabbath eve, where a pillar of light moving before him. One of these times, he was so attracted by his subject of study that he had forgotten to return home, in order to perform his marital duties, the commandment of onah. When his father in-law, Rabbi Yannai, heard about it, he said he must be dead, since if he were to be alive he would not have neglected the performance of his marital duties. The sages of the Talmud explain that the statement of Rabbi Yannai was "like an error that proceeds from the ruler", namely, the words of a tzadik must come true even if he did not intend them, and indeed Judah his son-in-law died.

== Teachings ==
His statements often are mentioned in the Talmud, especially in Order Kodashim.
