= Shemini =

Shemini is a Hebrew word that means "eighth", and may refer to:

- Shemini (parsha), the 26th weekly Torah portion
- Shemini Atzeret, a Jewish holiday
