= Judith (wife of Rabbi Hiyya) =

Yehudit (Hebrew: יהודית, romanized: Yehudit) was the wife of Rabbi Hiyya the Great and mother of the Amorai Oshiyya, the twin Amoraim Judah and Hezekiah and twin daughters, Pazi and Tavi.

== Relationship with Rabbi Hiyya ==
According to the Talmud in Yevamot, Judith embittered her husband's life. Despite this, he always treated her with respect. When he would find something that would make her happy, he would bring it to her. HIs nephew, Rav asked him why he made the effort to make her happy even though she would cause him to suffer, Rabbi Hiyya replied, "It is sufficient for us to recognize the goodness in our wives, that they raise our children and save us from the sin of thinking about other women."

== Her suffering and desire to be barren ==
After she gave birth to two sets of twins, which heightened her suffering in childbirth, she wanted to stop having marital relations with her husband. In order to do so, she told Rabbi Hiyya that her mother told her that her father had betrothed her to another man while she was still a minor, and therefore she was forbidden to him, as she was already married to someone else. Rabbi Hiyya held that her mother's testimony was not valid, because she was an invalid witness for two reasons, both because she was a woman and because she was a relative.

There was another similar incident later. Judith wanted to cause herself to become barren so that she would not have any more children. But she was concerned that she may transgress the prohibition of be fruitful and multiply. She put on a disguise and came before Rabbi Hiyya to ask whether women were obligated in the mitzvah of being fruitful. When he answered that they were not, she drank a potion that caused her to become barren. When Rabbi Hiyya learned of this, he shook his head in pain and said, "If only she would have born me another set of twins."
