= Hiyya the Great =

Rabbi and author of the Tosefta (c.180–c.230)

Personal life
- Born: Hiyya bar Abba ca. 180 CE
- Died: ca. 230 CE Tiberias
- Parent: Abba Karsala (father)
- Notable work: Tosefta

Religious life
- Religion: Judaism
- Sect: Rabbinic Judaism

Jewish leader
- Teacher: Judah ha-Nasi
- Disciples: Rav

Hiyya, or Hiyya the Great, (ca. 180–230 CE; Jewish Palestinian Aramaic: חייא, romanized: Ḥiyyā) was one of the Chazal or Rabbinical Jewish sages in the Land of Israel during the transitional generation between the Tannaic and Amoraic eras. Active in Tiberias, Hiyya was the primary compiler of the Tosefta. His full name was Hiyya bar Abba, also the name of the third generation amora Hiyya bar Abba. He was a student of Judah ha-Nasi and the uncle and teacher of Abba Arikha.

== Biography ==
=== In Babylonia ===
Rabbi Hiyya was originally from the city of Kapri in Babylonia and was the son of Abba Karsala. He descended from the family of Shimei, a brother of King David.

He passed the earlier part of his life in Babylonia, where he married a certain Judith. By her he had twin sons, Judah and Hezekiah (both of whom became renowned rabbis), and twin daughters, Pazi and Tavi. Hiyya was unhappy in his married life, for his wife was a shrew. This was so keenly felt by Hiyya that when asked by his nephew for a blessing he said: "May God preserve you from an evil that is worse than death—a contentious woman". Hiyya was especially affected by a trick she played upon him. Disguising herself, she went to him and asked whether the obligation of propagating the human race extended to women; receiving an answer in the negative, she took drugs which rendered her barren. However, Hiyya's good nature was so great that he overwhelmed her with presents, meeting the astonishment of his nephew by saying that men should show themselves grateful to their wives for rearing their children and for keeping their husbands from sin.

=== In the Land of Israel ===
In the latter part of his life Hiyya emigrated to Tiberias where he established a business in silks, which he exported to Tyre. The high reputation acquired by him in Babylonia had preceded him to Israel, and he soon became the center of the collegiate circle of the patriarch Judah haNasi. Regarding him more as a colleague than as a pupil, Judah treated Hiyya as his guest whenever the latter chanced to be at Sepphoris, consulted him, and took him with him when he went to Caesarea to visit Antoninus. His admiration for Hiyya was so great that he used to say: "Hiyya and his sons are as meritorious as the Patriarchs".

Judah's friendship and high esteem for Hiyya are connected in the aggadah with a miracle. In course of a conversation with him Judah said that if the Babylonian exilarch Rav Huna, who was believed to be descended from David, came to Israel he (Judah) would yield to him the office of patriarch. When Huna died and his body was brought to Israel for burial, Hiyya went to Judah and said, "Huna is here," and, after pausing to notice Judah's pallor, added, "his coffin has arrived." Seriously offended, Judah banished Hiyya for thirty days. While the latter was away, the prophet Elijah, assuming Hiyya's features, presented himself to Judah and healed a toothache from which the patriarch had suffered for thirteen years. Judah was not long in discovering the truth of this wonderful cure, and his respect for Hiyya increased. Hiyya was also close with Judah's son Simeon, whom he learnt Psalms with.

It was said among the Israeli Jews that since the arrival of Hiyya storms did not occur in Israel and wine did not turn sour. His prayers are said to have brought rain in a time of drought and to have caused a lion, which had rendered the roads unsafe, to leave Israel. Other miracles of the same kind are credited to him. He was especially lauded by his Babylonian compatriots. Simeon ben Lakish names him after the two other Babylonians, Ezra and Hillel, who came to Israel to restore the study of the Torah. However exaggerated this assertion may be, Hiyya was certainly very active in the promotion of learning in Israel . He founded schools for children and often acted as instructor. It is related that when Hanina bar Hama boasted that he could reconstruct the Torah by logic should it be forgotten, Hiyya said: "I am able to devise a method by which the Torah would never be forgotten by Israel, for I would bring flax seed, sow it, spin thread, twist ropes, and prepare traps by means of which I would catch gazelles. The flesh of these I would distribute among poor orphans, and I would use the hides to make parchment, on which I would write the Torah. Provided with this, I would go to places where there are no teachers, and instruct the children."

Hiyya is portrayed in the Talmud as a model of virtue and goodness. His house is said to have been always open to the poor. Even his death is connected by legend with an act of charity: "The angel of death could not approach him. The angel therefore disguised himself as a poor man and knocked at Hiyya's door. Hiyya, as usual, gave the order to bring bread for the poor. Then the angel said: 'You have compassion on the poor; why not have pity upon me? Give me your life and spare me the trouble of coming so many times.' Then Hiyya gave himself up." At his death, relates another aggadah, stones of fire fell from the skies.

== Teachings ==
=== Halacha ===
Hiyya's activity in the field of halakhah was very extensive. To him and his pupil Hoshea is due the redaction of the traditional halakhot which had not been included by Judah haNasi in the Mishnah. These halakhot are known under the various names of "Baraitot de-Rabbi Hiyya," "Mishnat de-Rabbi Hiyya," and "Mishnayot Gedolot." Some of them are introduced in the Talmud with the words "Tane Rabbi Hiyya," and are considered the only correct version of the halakhot omitted by Judah. Hiyya was the author of original halakhot also, which he derived from the Mishnah by the hermeneutic rules.

Hiyya seems to have contributed to the Sifra the redaction of the tannaitic midrash to Leviticus, where his sayings are often quoted. From the time of Sherira Gaon, Hiyya was generally regarded as the author of the Tosefta, but the supposition has been rejected on very strong grounds by modern scholars.

Although very conservative, he opposed the issuing of new prohibitions: "Make not the fence higher than the Law itself, lest it should fall and destroy the plants".

=== Aggadah ===
Hiyya's activity extended also to the aggadah. Sayings of his, and his controversies with Simeon ben Halafta, Bar Kappara, Jonathan, and Jannai are frequently quoted in aggadic literature.

As a Babylonian Hiyya hated the Romans, whom he compared to obnoxious insects. "God foresaw that the Jews could not bear the yoke of the Romans, and therefore designed Babylonia for their place of residence".

Hiyya's views on some Biblical books are noteworthy. According to him the Book of Job is the work of a non-Jew, and Solomon wrote his works in his old age.

Hiyya's aggadot are particularly rich in thoughts concerning the moral life and the relations of human beings to one another.

Hiyya was a physician of high repute. The Talmud quotes many of his medical utterances, among which is a description of the development of the embryo in the womb which betrays considerable medical knowledge.

=== Quotes ===
- As the dawn spreads gradually, so will the deliverance of Israel come gradually.
