= Hezekiah (Amora) =

Hezekiah (or Hezekiah ben Hiyya; Hebrew: חזקיה or חזקיה בן חייא; cited in the Talmud simply as Hezekiah) was a Jewish Amora sage of the Land of Israel of the second generation of the Amoraic era. He was the son of R. Hiyya and his wife Judith. He was the teacher of R. Yochanan bar Nafcha, and he is the same simple "Hezekiah" that is cited frequently in the Talmud.

According to Rashi he is also considered a Tanna, as well as according to the opinion of the Tosafot.

Among his colleagues were Rabbi Yannai, who was older than him, Bar Kappara, Rav Kahana I, and R. Joshua ben Levi.

Among his most prominent pupils was R. Yochanan bar Nafcha, and as long as Hezekiah was present, Yochanan bar Nafcha was not appointed as dean of the Yeshiva out of respect for his teacher-Rabbi.

His Beth midrash was located at Tiberias, and it is storied that he used to recite the Megillah (Book of Esther) on both fourteenth and fifteenth of the Hebrew month of Adar, due to an halakhic issue, wherein the Megillah must be read on the fourteenth in cities not walled in the days of Joshua bin Nun, and on the fifteenth in cities that were walled in the days of Joshua bin Nun, and he was not sure whether Tiberias was walled during the days of Joshua
