= Adriaan =

Adriaan is the Dutch and Afrikaans spelling of the given name Adrian. Before the 19th century the spelling Adriaen was also common, and people used the spelling interchangeably.

== People with the given name ==
=== Artists ===
- Adriaen Backer (1635–1684), Dutch portrait painter
- Adriaen Cornelisz Beeldemaker (1618–1709), Dutch Golden Age painter
- Adriaen de Bie (1593–1668), Flemish painter
- Adriaan Bloemaert (c. 1609 – 1666), Dutch painter
- Adriaen van Bloemen (1639 – c. 1679), Flemish Baroque painter, printmaker, draughtsman and engraver
- Adriaan Bonsel (1918–2011), Dutch composer
- Adriaen Brouwer (1605–1638), Flemish genre painter
- Adriaen Frans Boudewijns (1644–1719), Flemish landscape painter
- Adriaan van der Burg (1693–1733), Dutch painter
- Adriaen van der Cabel (1631–1705), Dutch painter of the Dutch school
- Adriaen Frans Boudewijns (1644–1719), Flemish landscape painter, draughtsman and etcher
- Adriaen Collaert (c. 1560 – 1618), Flemish designer and engraver
- Adriaen Coorte (c. 1665 – 1707+), Dutch still life painter
- Adriaen Pietersz Crabeth (1510–1553), Dutch Renaissance glass painter
- Adriaen van Cronenburg (c. 1525 – 1604+), Dutch portrait painter
- Adriaen van Diest (1655–1704), Dutch painter
- Adriaan Dortsman (1635–1682), Dutch architect
- Adriaen van Eemont (1626–1662), Dutch still life and landscape painter
- Adriaen Foly (1664–1701), Danish painter
- Adriaen van Gaesbeeck (1621–1650), Dutch genre painter
- Adriaan Geuze (born 1960), Dutch landscape architect
- Adriaen de Grijef (1657–1722), Dutch painter
- Adriaen Hanneman (1603–1671), Dutch portrait painter
- Adriaan Jozef Heymans (1839–1921), Belgian impressionist landscape painter
- Adriaen Honich (1643 – c. 1684), Dutch landscape painter
- Adriaen Isenbrandt (c.1485–1551), Flemish Northern Renaissance painter
- Adriaen Thomasz Key (c. 1544 – c. 1599), Flemish portrait painter
- Adriaen Jansz Kraen (1619–1679), Dutch still life painter
- Adriaan de Lelie (1755–1820), Dutch painter
- Adriaen Cornelisz van Linschoten (1590–1677), Dutch Golden Age painter
- Adriaen Matham (1590–1660), Dutch Golden Age painter, engraver and art dealer
- Adriaen van Nieulandt (1587–1658), Dutch painter, draughtsman and engraver
- Adriaen van Oolen (c. 1650 – 1709), Dutch bird, landscape and still life painter
- Adriaen van Ostade (1610–1685), Dutch genre painter
- Adriaen Oudendijck (1677–1704), Dutch landscape painter
- Adriaen van Salm (c. 1660 – 1720), Dutch marine draftsman and painter
- Adriaen van der Spelt (c. 1630 – 1673), Dutch Golden Age flower painter
- Adriaan van Stalbemt (1580–1662), Flemish Baroque painter
- Adriaen van Utrecht (1599–1652), Flemish Baroque still life painter
- Adriaen Valerius (c. 1575 – 1625), Dutch poet and composer
- Adriaen van de Velde (1636–1672), Dutch animal and landscape painter
- Adriaen van de Venne (1589–1662), Dutch painter, miniaturist, book-illustrator and designer of political satires
- Adriaen Hendriksz Verboom (1627–1673), Dutch Golden Age landscape painter
- Adriaan Verbuch (fl. 1600), Dutch Golden Age painter
- Adriaen Verdoel (c. 1620 – 1675), Dutch Golden Age painter
- Adriaen de Vries (c. 1556 – 1626), Dutch Northern Mannerist sculptor
- Adriaan Gerritsz de Vrije (c. 1570 – 1643), Dutch glass painter
- Adriaen de Weever (c. 1510 – c. 1590), Flemish Renaissance painter
- Adriaen van der Werff (1659–1722), accomplished Dutch painter
- Adriaan Willaert (c. 1490 – 1562), Flemish composer

=== Scholars and scientists ===
- Adriaan Adriaanszoon (1571–1635), Dutch geometer and astronomer
- Adriaan Anthonisz (1541–1620), Durtch mathematician and engineer, mayor of Alkmaar, father of above
- Adriaan van Baarland (1486–1538), Dutch historian
- Adriaan Bax (born 1956), Dutch molecular biophysicist
- Adriaan Blaauw (1814–2000), Dutch astronomer
- Adriaan Gilles Camper (1759–1820), Dutch mathematics and physicist
- Adriaan Fokker (1887–1972), Dutch physicist and musician
- Adriaan de Groot (1914–2006), Dutch chess master and psychologist
- Adriaan de Groot (born 1973), Dutch computer programmer
- Adriaan Heereboord (1613–1661), Dutch philosopher and logician
- Adriaen de Jonghe (1511–1575), Dutch physician, classical scholar, translator, lexicographer, etc.
- Adriaan Kluit (1735–1807), Dutch linguist
- Adriaan Koerbagh (1633–1669), Dutch scholar and writer
- Adriaan Kortlandt (1918–2009), Dutch ethologist
- Adriaan van Maanen (1884–1946), Dutch–American astronomer
- Adriaan Metius (1571–1635), Dutch geometer and astronomer
- Adriaan Isebree Moens (1846–1891), Dutch physician and physiologist
- Adriaan Nicolaas Petrus Pelzer (1915–1981), South African Afrikaans academic, historian and author
- Adriaan Hendrik Johan Prins (1921–2000), Dutch Africanist and maritime anthropologist
- Adriaan Reland (1676–1718), Dutch Orientalist scholar, cartographer and philologist
- Adriaan van Roomen (1561–1615), Flemish mathematician
- Adriaan Joseph van Rossem (1892–1949), American ornithologist
- Adriaan van Royen (1704–1779), Dutch botanist
- Adriaan van den Spiegel (1578–1625), Flemish anatomist
- Adriaen Verwer (c. 1655 – 1717), Dutch Mennonite merchant, scholar, philosopher and linguist
- Adriaan Vlacq (1600–1667), Dutch book publisher and author of mathematical tables
- Adriaan Wesselink (1909–1995), Dutch astronomer
- Adriaan van Wijngaarden (1916–1987), Dutch mathematician and computer scientist
- Adriaan van der Willigen Pz. (1810–1876), Dutch doctor and historian
- Adriaan Cornelis Zaanen (1913–2003), Dutch mathematician

=== Sportspeople ===
- Adriaan Botha (sprinter) (born 1977), South African sprinter
- Adriaan Carelse (born 1995), South African rugby player
- Adriaan Dewagtere (born 2001), Belgian short-track speed skater
- Adriaan Engelbrecht (born 1990), South African rugby player
- Adriaan Fondse (born 1983), South African rugby player
- Adriaan Katte (1900–1991), Dutch field hockey player
- Adriaan Koonings (1895–1963), Dutch footballer
- Adriaan Paulen (1902–1985), Dutch athlete and president of the IAAF
- Adriaan Richter (born 1966), South African rugby player
- Adriaan Strauss (born 1985), South African rugby player

=== Statesmen, religious leaders and military leaders ===
- Adriaen Banckert (1615–1684), Dutch admiral
- Adriaen Maertensz Block (1582–1661), successively captain, commander, and governor of the Ambon Island
- Adriaan Boeyens (1459–1523), Dutch pope (Adrian VI)
- Adriaan Dijxhoorn (1889–1953), Dutch Minister of Defence during the German invasion of the Netherlands in 1940
- Adriaan Engelvaart (1812–1893), Dutch military commander and politician
- Adriaan van Flodroff (died 1690), Dutch Major General of cavalry
- Adriaan Florensz (1459–1523), Dutch pope (Adrian VI)
- Adriaan van der Meyden (fl. 1653–63), Dutch Governor of Ceylon
- Adriaan Pauw (1585–1653), Grand Pensionary of Holland
- Adriaan van der Stel (died 1646), Dutch governor of Mauritius
- Adriaan Valckenier (1695–1751), Governor-General of the Dutch East Indies from 1737 to 1741
- Adriaan Kaland (1922–1995), Dutch senator
- Adriaan van Veldhuizen (1932–2013), Dutch senator
- Adriaan Vlok (1937–2023), South African politician

=== Writers, actors, film directors ===
- Adriaan van Dis (born 1946), Dutch author
- Adriaan Ditvoorst (1940–1987), Dutch film director and screenwriter
- Adriaan Kyvon (born 1947), Dutch comedian, television producer and screenwriter
- Adriaan Loosjes (1761–1818), Dutch botanist, poet, novelist and publisher
- Adriaan van Hees (1910–1976), Dutch actor and member of the NSB
- Adriaan van Meerbeeck (1563–1627), Flemish writer and translator
- Adriaan Theodoor Peperzak (born 1929), Dutch educator, editor and author
- Adriaan Poirters (1605–1674), Dutch Jesuit poet and prose writer
- Adriaan Roland Holst (1888–1976), Dutch writer, nicknamed the "Prince of Dutch Poets"
- Adriaan van Toor (born 1942), Dutch comedian

=== Other ===
- Adriaen van Bergen (fl. 1590), devised the plot to recapture the city of Breda from the Spanish during the Eighty Years' War
- Adriaen Block (1567–1627), Dutch private trader and navigator
- Adriaen van der Donck (1618–1655), Dutch lawyer, landowner and ethnographer in New Netherland after whom Yonkers, New York is named
- Adriaan Justus Enschedé (1829–1896), Dutch archivist, collector, printer and philanthropist
- Adriaan van der Hoop (1778–1854), Dutch banker
- Adriaan Pelt (1892–1981), Dutch journalist, international civil servant and diplomat
- Adriaan van Ravesteijn (1938–2015), Dutch gallerist and art collector
- Adriaan Stoop (1856–1935), Dutch oil explorer
- Adriaen Jorissen Tienpoint (fl. 1624–26), Dutch explorer of the American East coast
- Adriaan Schade van Westrum (1865–1917), Dutch-American newspaper editor
- Adriaan A. van der Willigen (1910–1986), Dutch philatelist

== See also ==
- De Adriaan, Haarlem, a windmill in Haarlem, North Holland
