= Verboom =

Verboom is a surname. Notable people with the surname include:

- Adriaen Hendriksz Verboom (1627–1673), Dutch painter
- Bryan Verboom (born 1992), Belgian footballer
- Hanna Verboom (born 1983), Dutch actress

== See also ==
- Marquis of Verboom (1665–1744), Flemish military engineer
