= Pieter Wouwerman =

Dutch Golden Age landscape painter

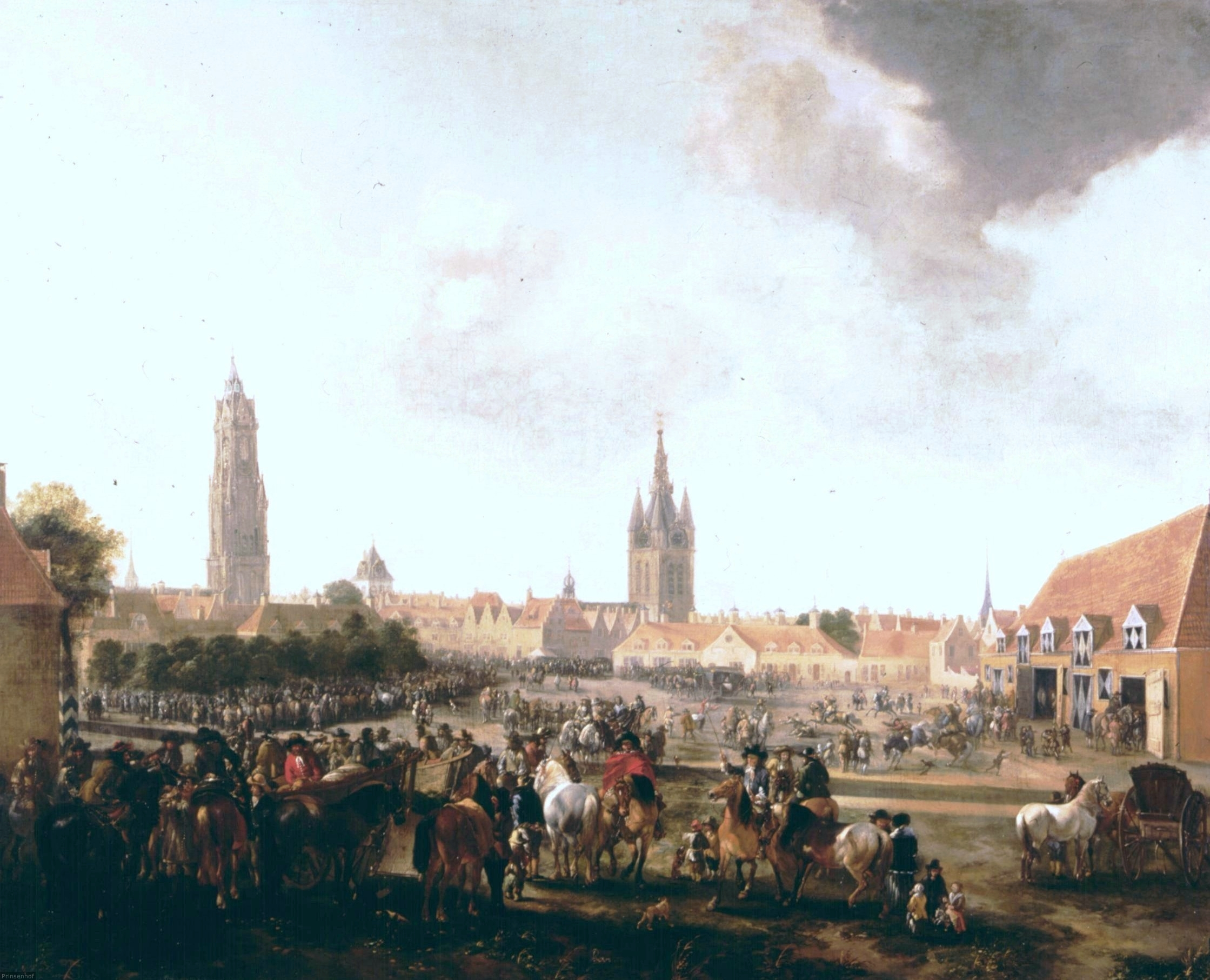
View of the horse market in Delft, 1665

Pieter Wouwerman (September 13, 1623 – May 9, 1682) was a Dutch Golden Age landscape painter.

== Biography ==
He was born in Haarlem. According to Arnold Houbraken, a biographer of artists from the Dutch Golden Age, Pieter Wouwerman was the brother of the landscape painters Jan and Philips Wouwerman, who, like his more famous brother, made a living selling Italianate landscapes in the manner of Pieter van Laer. Houbraken mentioned a story in which Philips Wouwerman burned his sketchbooks before his death, so that his brother would not be able to use them and cash in on his name. Houbraken claimed that the story was malicious gossip, but he had heard another story that was probably closer to the truth. Apparently when Pieter van Laer returned to Haarlem, his art was worth less than what he received in Rome, but he would not lower his price. When a landscape that Laer made was considered too expensive, the buyer contracted the then young Philips Wouwermans to copy it, which he did quite well. The success of this transaction launched the career of the young Wouwermans at the expense of Pieter van Laer, and Houbraken heard from Michiel Carré who in turn heard it from Pieter Gerritsz van Roestraten and Jacob de Wet that guilt forced Wouwerman to burn the proof of all of his copies before he died.

According to the RKD (Netherlands Institute for Art History), he was a student of Roelant Roghman, his older brother Philips, and his father Pouwels. He left Haarlem for Amsterdam in 1657. He died in 1682 in Amsterdam.
