= Matthias Scheits =

German Baroque painter (1630–1700)

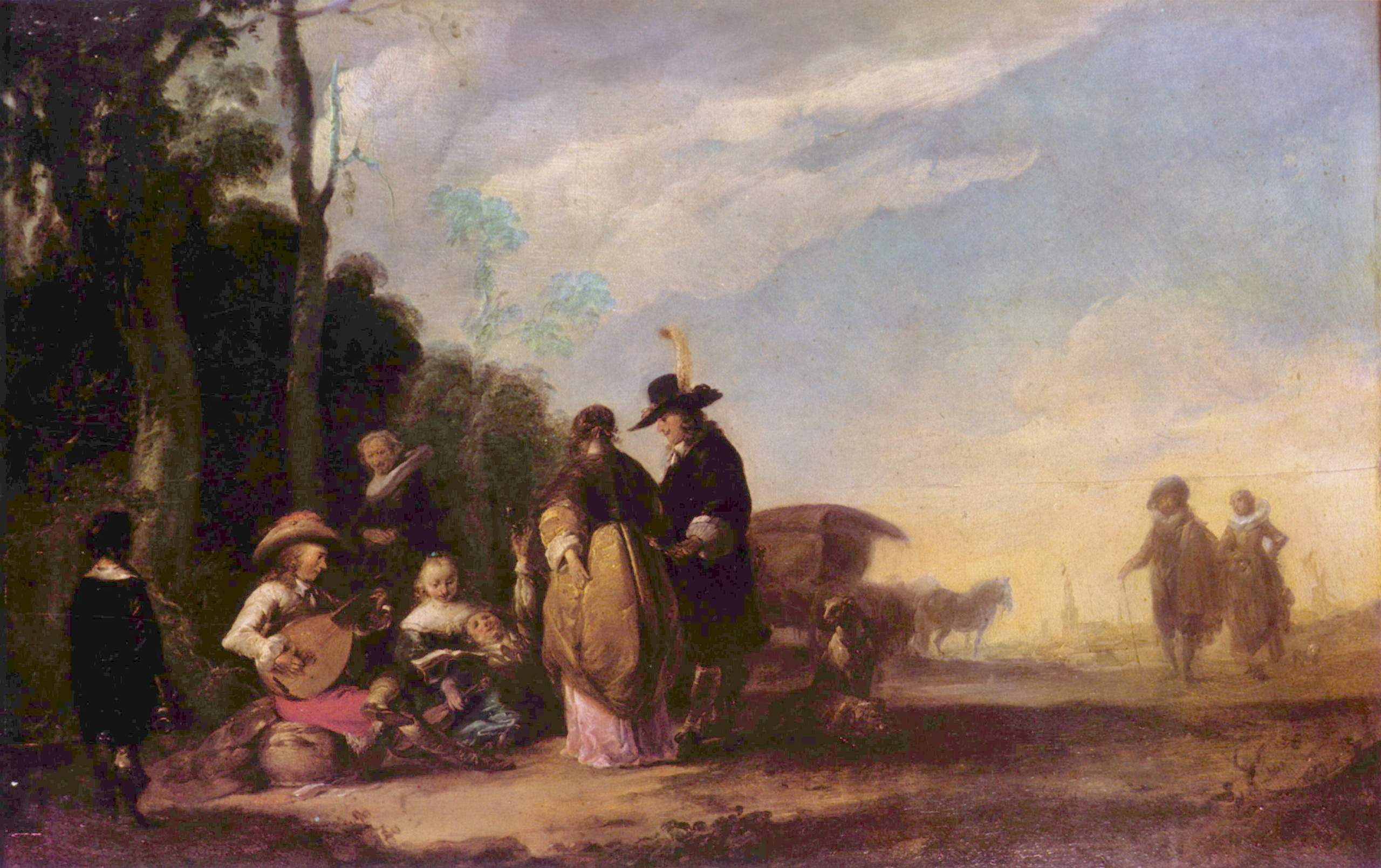
Landscape with figures

Matthias Scheits (1630 in Hamburg – 1700 in Hamburg) was a German Baroque painter.

According to Houbraken he was in Hamburg while Johannes Voorhout was there and though he had initially trained in Haarlem under Philips Wouwerman, he later painted farm & village scenes in the manner of David Teniers. Voorhout met him while he was working on historical sketches that were later published under his own name as prints of the old and new testament.

According to the RKD he was the teacher of the painter Adam de Manyoki.
