= Capture of Breda (1590) =

Battle in the Eighty Years' War

- Part of the Eighty Years' War and the Anglo-Spanish War (1585–1604)
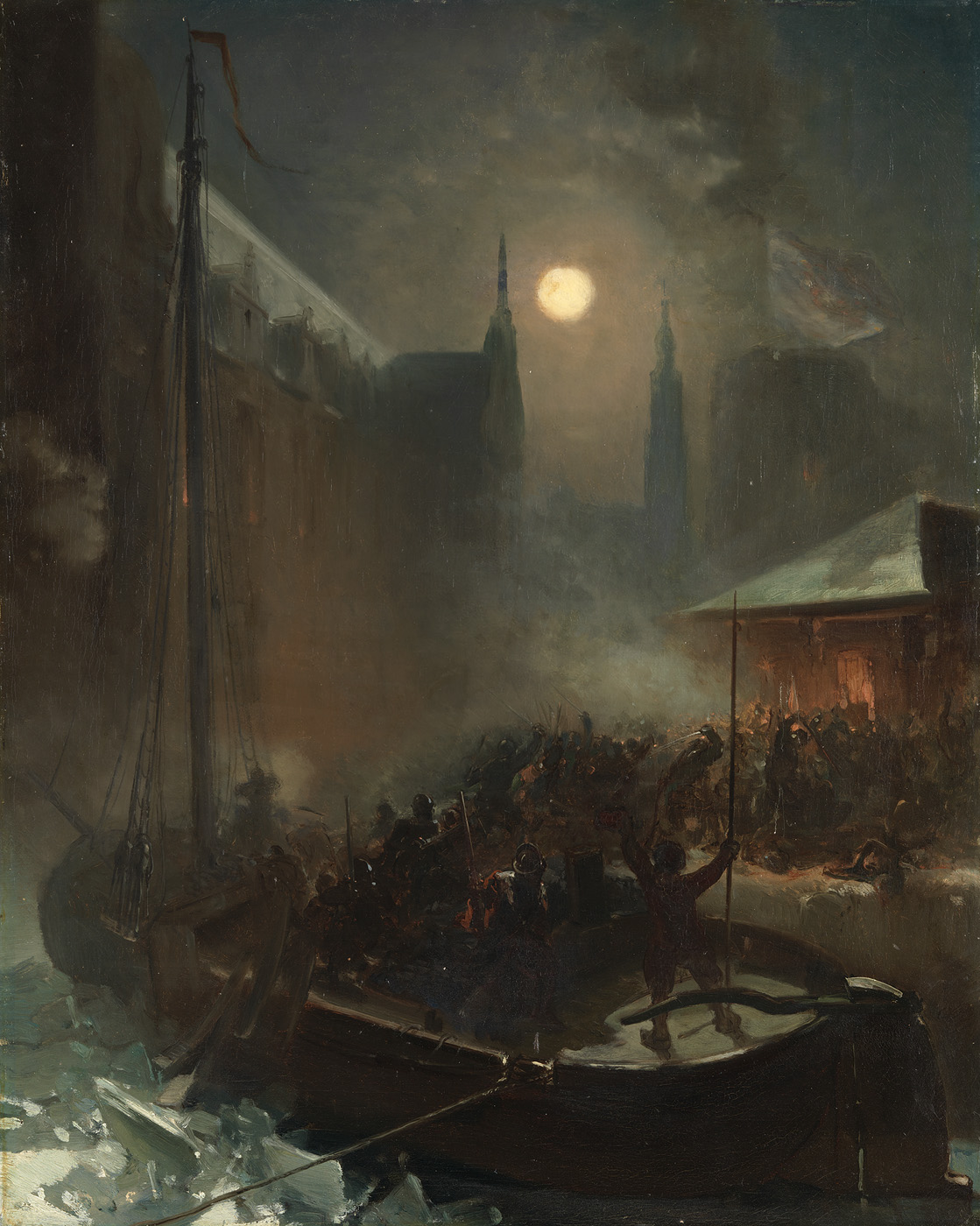
- The Peat boat at Breda by Charles Rochussen
Date	4 March 1590
Location	Breda, Netherlands 51°34′N 4°48′E
Result	Dutch-English victory

Belligerents
Dutch Republic; England	(Spain) Spanish Empire

Commanders and leaders
(Dutch Republic) Maurice of Nassau (Kingdom of England) Francis Vere (Dutch Republic) Charles de Heraugiere (assault)	(Spain) Paolo Lanzavecchia

Strength
1,700 (70 in assault)	600

Casualties and losses
One soldier drowned	40 killed or wounded

The capture of Breda was a short battle during the Eighty Years' War and Anglo-Spanish War (1585–1604) during which a Dutch and English army led by Maurice of Nassau captured the heavily protected city of Breda. Using a clever tactic reminiscent of the Trojan horse which became famous as the ruse with the Turfschip van Breda, a small assault force hid in a peat barge, entered the city of Breda, and proceeded to take it over resulting in a minimum number of casualties. It was the turning point of the war as the forces under Maurice were able to take the offensive.

== Background ==
The city of Breda is located in the confluence of the rivers Aa and Mark, in the province of Brabant and the main city of the zone. It was well fortified, and was surrounded by a defensive moat fed by waters of the Mark river. Breda had been under Spanish control from 1581 and had a garrison of 500 men of infantry and a hundred of cavalry. The troops were Italian and Spanish, the majority being from Sicily in the service of the Spanish Empire. Eduardo Lanzavecchia, the governor of Breda and Geertruidenberg, was supervising the construction of fortifications of both cities as he knew that soon they would be under attack. He was in Geertruidenberg in early 1590 supervising the construction of the defenses there but in his absence, his nephew Paolo Lanzavecchia was acting governor of Breda.

=== The Peat Barge (Turfschip) ===
In February 1590, a nobleman from Cambrai, Charles de Heraugiere, under orders from Maurice of Nassau, was to make a covert reconnoiter of Breda. Disguised as a fisherman he was hoping to enter Breda and to study its weaknesses, garrison strength, and general conditions. Heraugiere contacted Adriaen van Bergen, loyal to the Dutch by trade who was used to entering and leaving Breda with a barge loaded of winter fuel, in this case peat. Heraugiere went into the city, hidden between the peat of the barge along with a small group of soldiers, but they discovered how incredibly easy it was as none of the garrison checked the barge. When they were in the heart of Breda they made a hasty exit with enough peat to keep them covered. Heraugiere soon realized a Trojan Horse style attack was too good an opportunity to miss and thus reported it to Maurice as soon as they returned.

The plan was presented to Maurice of Nassau, who was glad to give his approval and then ordered the operation the go ahead but in maximum secrecy. On the 25th of February Charles de Heraugiere was to lead the covert assault in charge of 68 hand-picked Dutch and English soldiers. They waited next to the mouth of the Mark river for the arrival of the boat of van Bergen and accompanied captains Logier, Fervet, and Lieutenant Matthew Held. That same day Maurice of Nassau, Francis Vere, and Count Hohenlohe with 800 Dutch and 600 English soldiers with 300 cavalry arrived at Willemstad, thirty kilometers from Breda. There they would have to wait for the signal of Heraugiere if all had gone well.

On the 26th, Heraugiere and his men embarked on van Bergen's boat; but he was too ill or overslept, and thus sent his two nephews, who would pilot the barge. Overcoming the Mark in the direction of Breda, they had to overcome the extreme cold of the Dutch winter. Ice made navigation difficult, delaying the voyage by several days. By Saturday evening, however, they had reached Breda and were at the outer gates early in the morning.

== Assault ==
Hidden under the piles of peat, they were able to enter the city with none of the soldiers checking, as expected. Having deceived the soldiers of the garrison, Heraugiere gave out the warning signal to Maurice, who then initiated the march of his troops towards the city without hesitation.

At dawn Sunday March 4, the attackers left their hiding place in the boat and were divided into two groups: Heraugiere attacked the position of guard, while Fervet tried to seize control of the fort's arsenal. In a fast action, that took by surprise the Italian soldiers garrisoning the city, the attackers killed forty defenders without any loss. So surprised were the Italians and Spanish that they dispersed into a total rout into the streets of the city. Before dawn, Count Hohenlohe arrived at the doors of Breda with the Dutch cavalry and after him Maurice of Nassau with the main body of the army; Count Solms, and Francis Vere being among them. By then the men of Heraugiere had already taken control of most of the city.

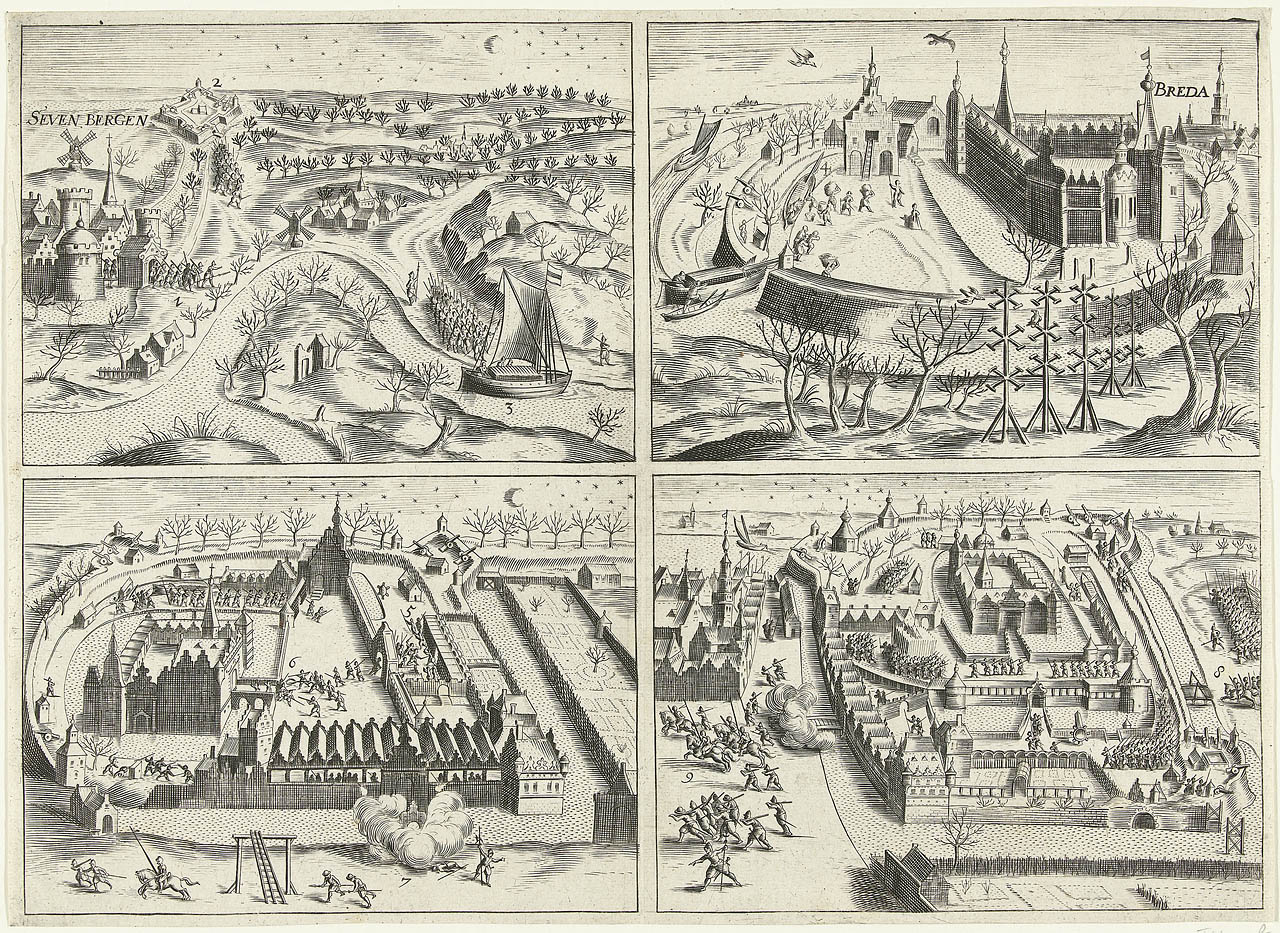
The capture of Breda in 1590 in four scenes. Print by Bartholomeus Dolendo

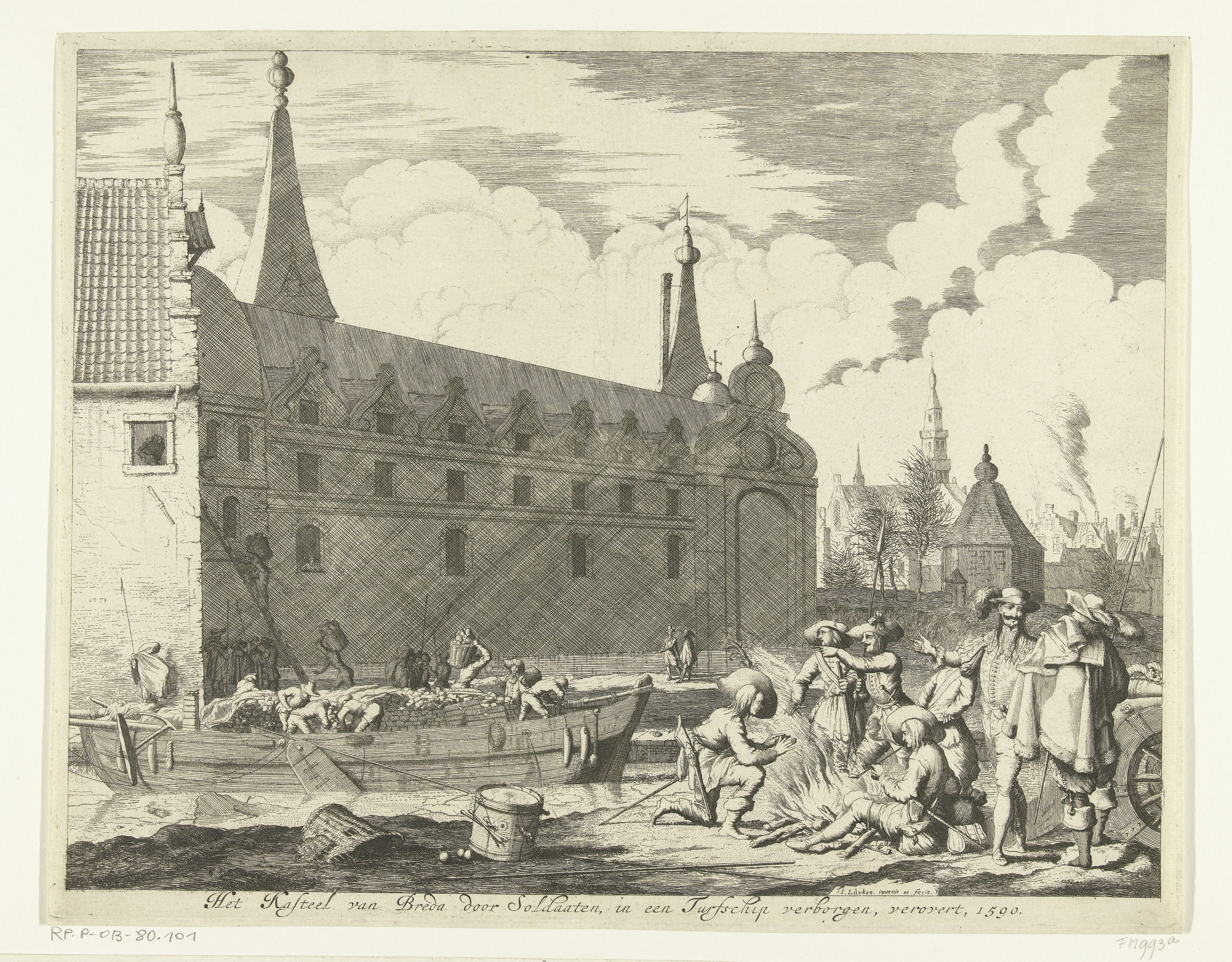
The peat boat, by Hugo Grotius

=== Surrender ===
With the Breda garrison completely surrounded and in total confusion Paolo Lanzavecchia negotiated with the attackers the conditions of the surrender of the city, that was decided according to the following terms:

- The city would not be sacked in exchange for the payment of two months to each of the participant soldiers in the attack. (The resulting amount, 100,000 florins would be excessive, since many of the soldiers claiming to have taken part arrived after the surrender).
- Citizens who wanted to leave the city would be respected in terms of religion.
- Those that wanted to remain would not be harmed, and their properties left alone.

== Consequences ==
The taking of Breda on the part of the Dutch and English troops, a city in the eyes of the Spaniards that was assumed to be safe, was a disagreeable surprise for the Spanish authorities. The Duke of Parma - Alexander Farnese was enraged by the cowardice of the Italian troops in charge of the defense of the city. He ordered three captains responsible for the garrison of Breda to be executed and a fourth official was expelled from the army. Finally, the recriminations ended with Eduardo Lanzavecchia being stripped of his position as governor of Geertruidenberg.

The huge success of the capture of Breda with barely any casualties was widely celebrated in the United Provinces. After years of defensive strategy, combined with Spanish forces distracted with the Protestant forces in France, the Dutch and English forces had at last achieved a decisive offensive success. The strategic value of the city led to patriotic celebrations and a number of commemorative coins were minted.

With the taking of Breda, Maurice of Nassau used the place as an operational base and from here he conquered Elshout, Fort Crèvecoeur near 's-Hertogenbosch, Steenbergen, Roosendaal, Oosterhout, and others. Charles de Heraugiere in light of his daring operation was designated governor of Breda and was also given a gold medal. The bargemen were given a subsidy for life as well as many of the soldiers taking part in the city's capture.

The city would remain in Dutch hands until 1625 when the Spanish tercios of Ambrosio Spinola would be able to recapture it after a long siege. In 1637 Breda after yet another siege would return to Dutch hands once and for all.

=== Legacy ===
Around 1610 the construction of the Spanish Gate or "Spandjaardsgat" was started as a remembrance to the successful capture of Breda in 1590. Also the gate was to assist in refreshing the stagnant water of the castle's moat.

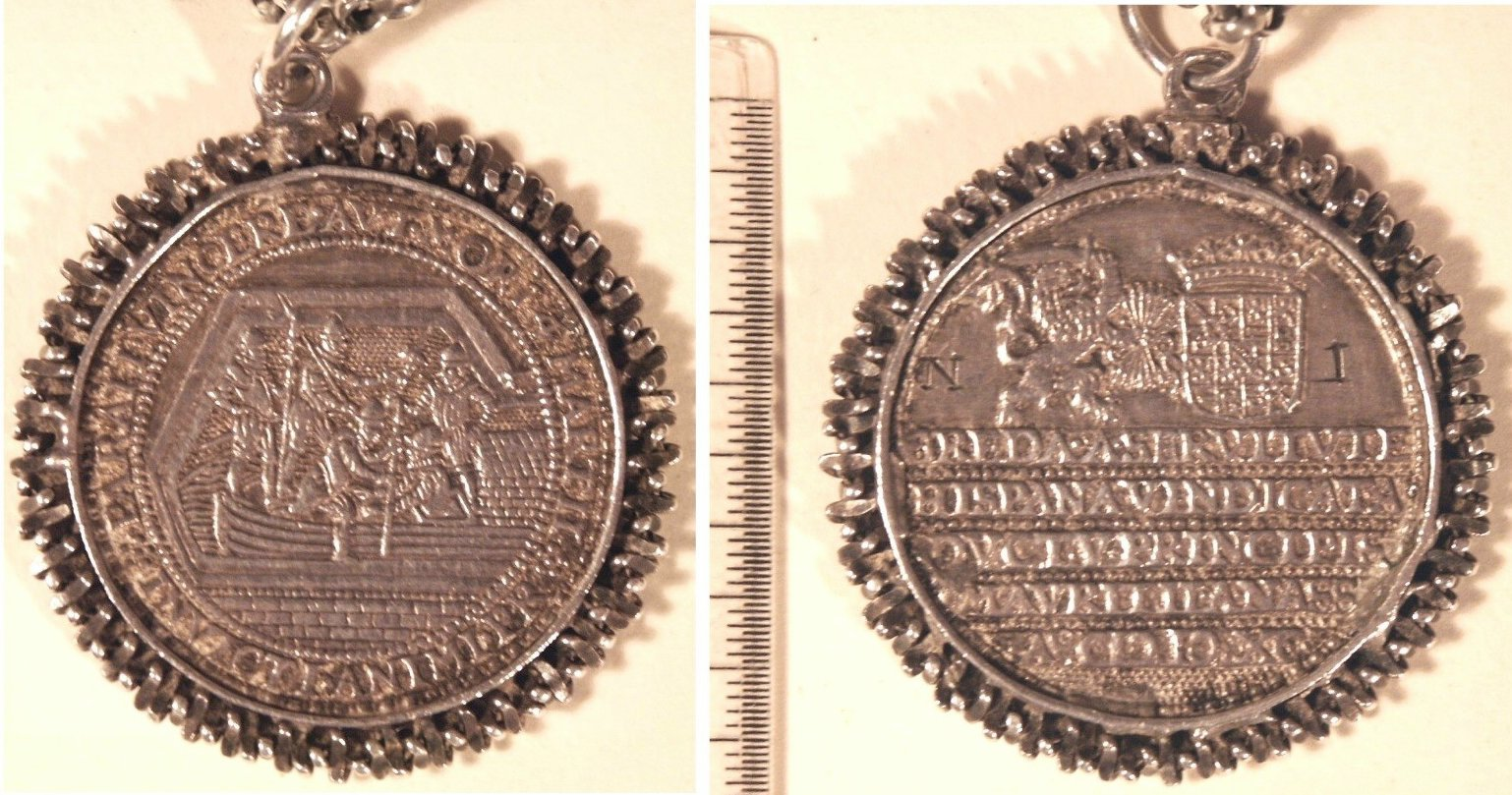
Coins celebrating the capture

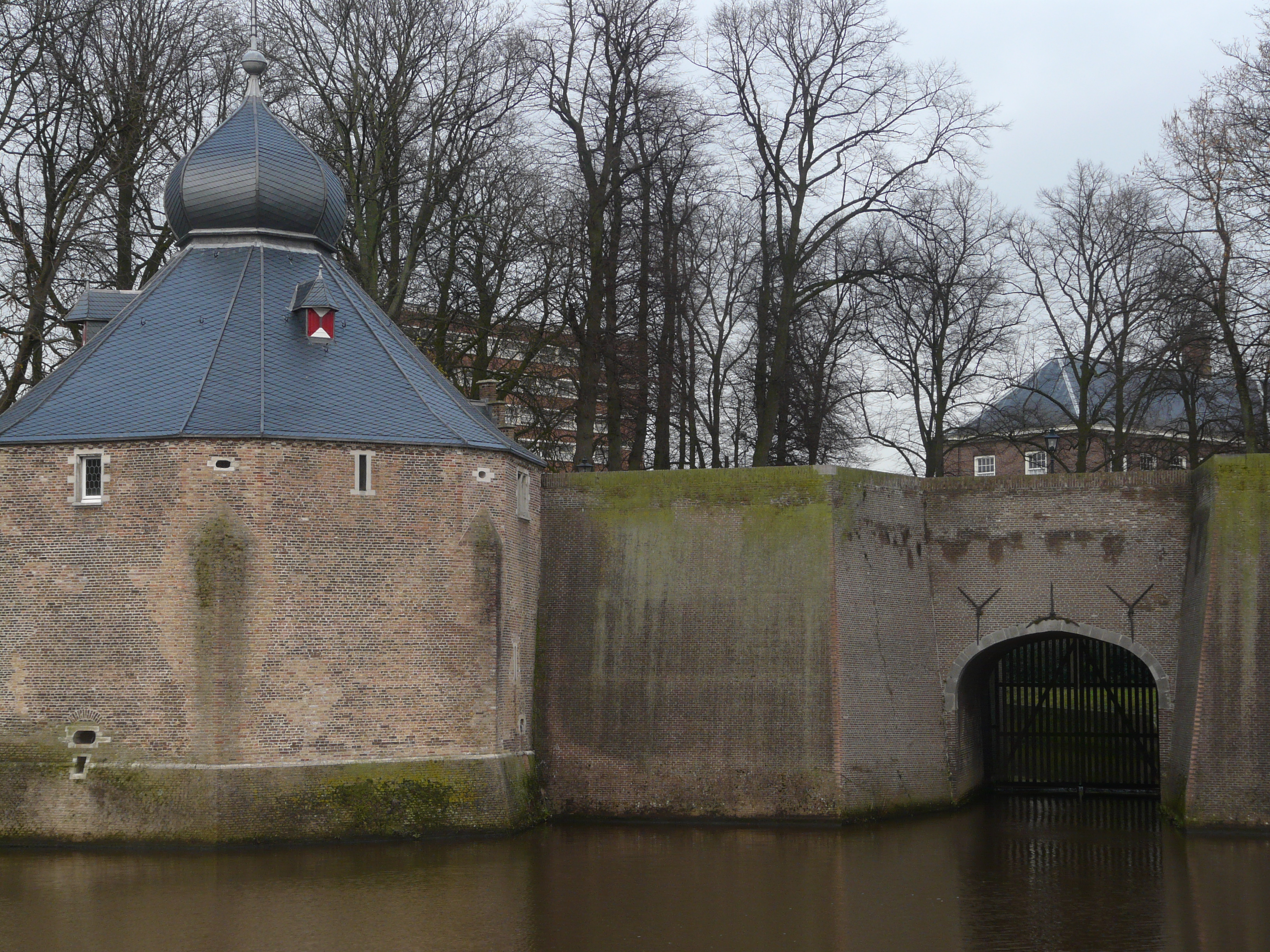
The Spanish Gate at Breda today

== See also ==
- Siege of Breda (1624)
- Siege of Breda (1637)
