= Jan Wouwerman =

Dutch Golden Age painter

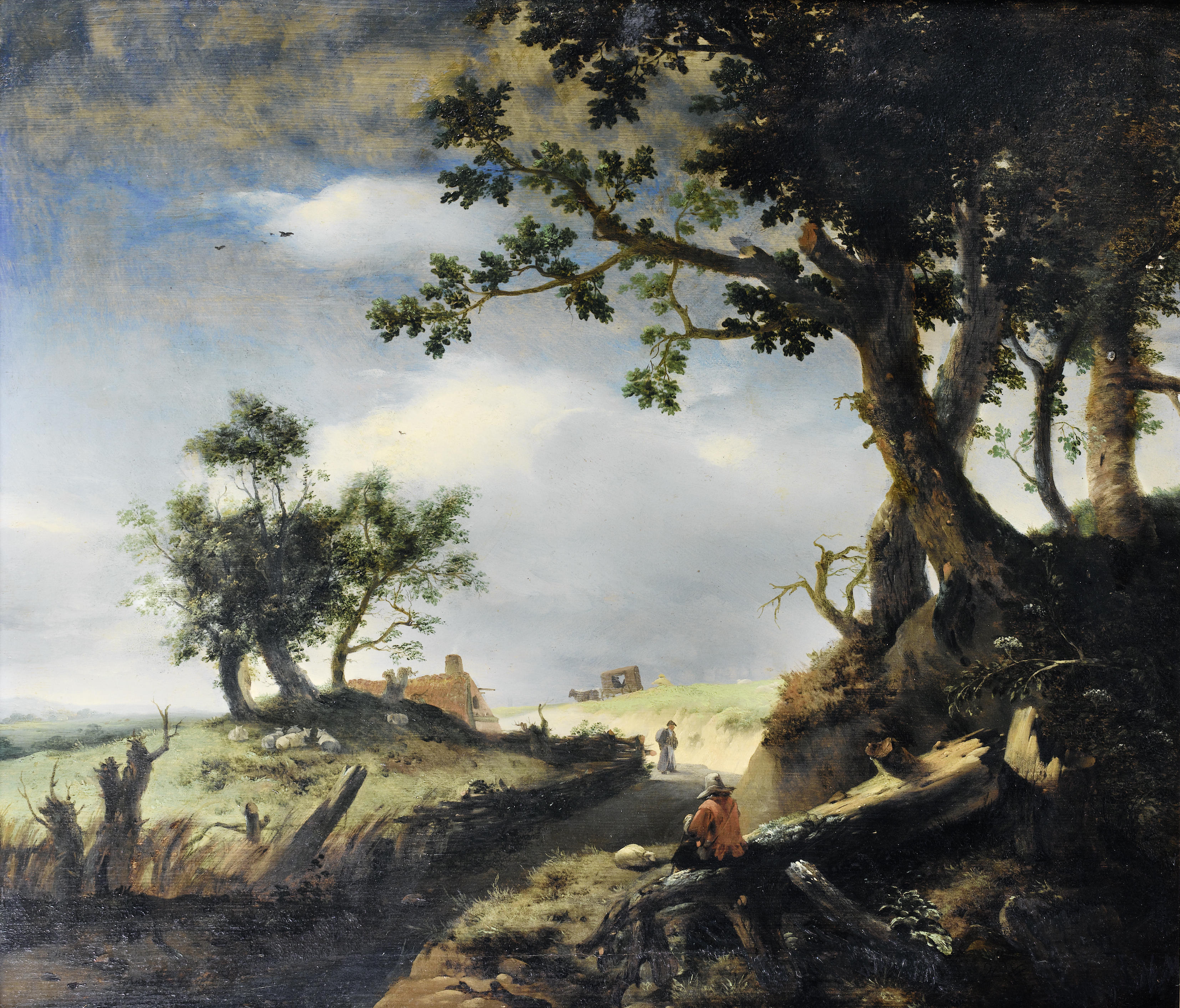
Landscape with figures.

Jan Wouwerman (1629 in Haarlem – 1666 in Haarlem), was a Dutch Golden Age painter.

According to Houbraken he was the youngest brother of the painters Philips and Pieter Wouwerman, who lived and worked in Haarlem. His work was relatively unknown when Houbraken was writing, and he assumed this was because he died young, two years before his oldest brother in 1666. Houbraken saw one of his landscapes at the home of Laurens van der Vinne, which was a mountainous landscape with a brown foreground, with rough and unclipped trees, while on the horizon a clear view of a valley could be seen. Especially the foreground was cleverly done, a bit loose and with original colors, the way one would have expected of his brother Philips in his younger years when he painted with more monotones than in his later years.

According to the RKD he was the youngest brother of Philips Wouwerman who was known for his landscapes in the manner of Jan Wijnants. He was buried in the St. Bavochurch of Haarlem. The RKD does not list him as a member, but his name is on the list of 173 members of the Haarlem Guild of St. Luke that Vincent van der Vinne produced in 1702.
