= The Rider's Halting Place =

Painting by Alfred Stevens

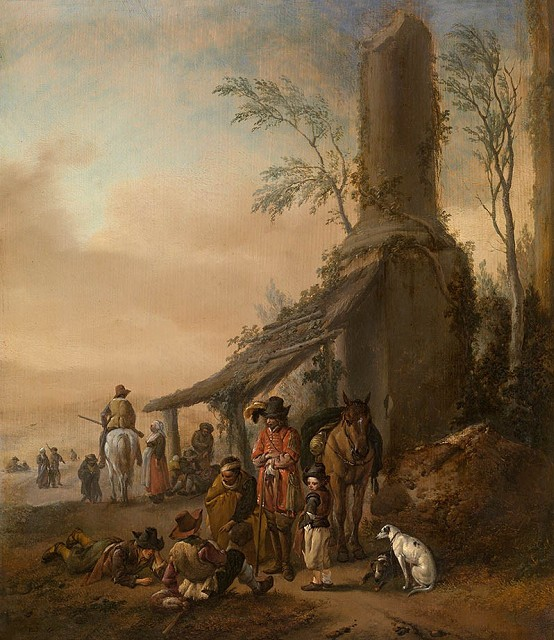
- Artist: Philips Wouwerman
- Year: 17th century
- Catalogue: 501
- Medium: Oil on panel
- Dimensions: 35.4 cm × 30.7 cm (13 9/3 in × 12 in)
- Location: Royal Museum of Fine Arts Antwerp; Antwerp

The Rider's Halting Place is a painting by the Dutch Golden Age painter Philips Wouwerman, active between 1639 and his death in 1668. He was a prolific painter of scenes with horses and riders in a landscape, such as this one. It is now in the Royal Museum of Fine Arts in Antwerp, Belgium.
