= Jacob Willemszoon de Wet =

Dutch Golden Age painter

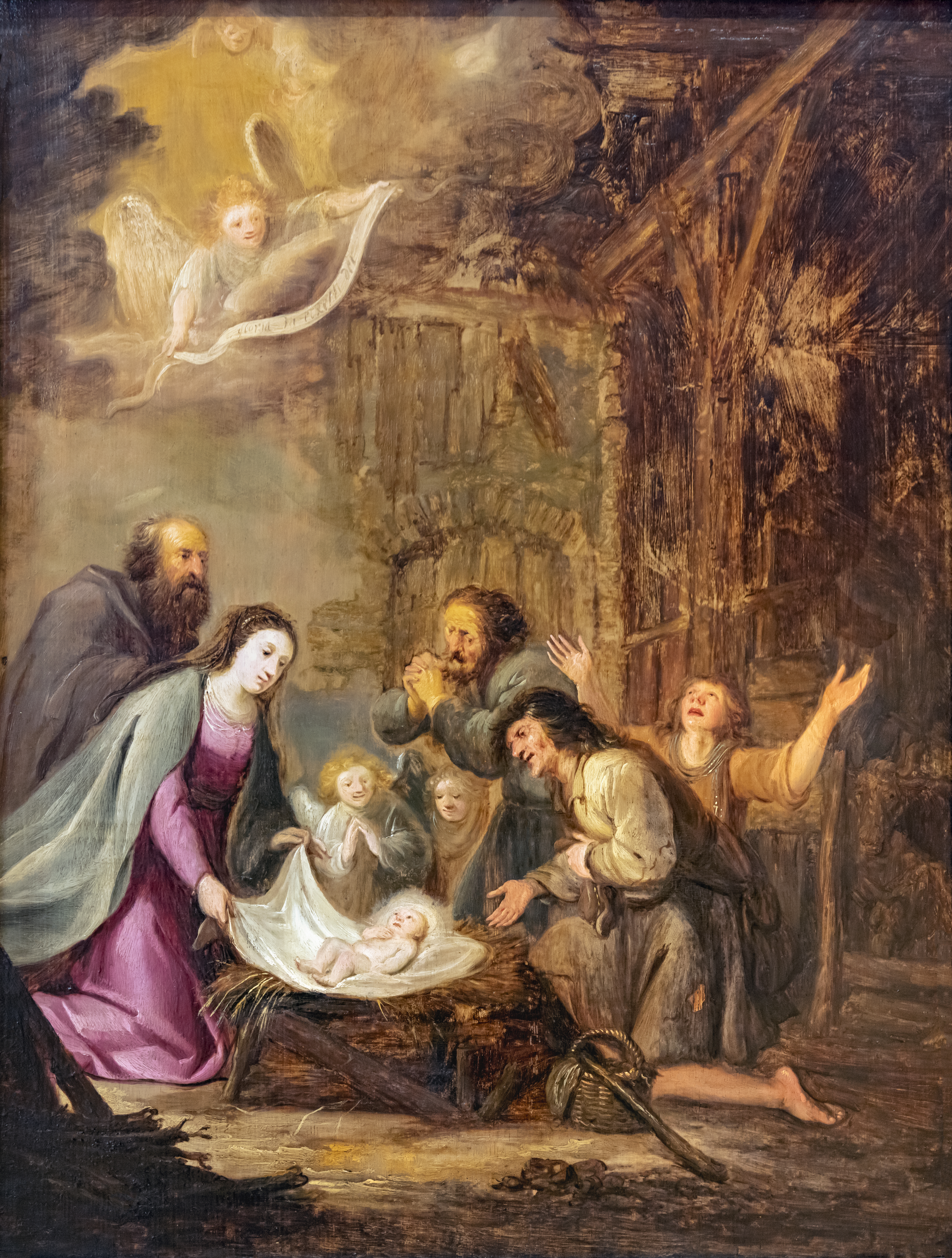

Jacob Willemszoon de Wet or Jacob Willemsz. de Wet the Elder (c. 1610 – between 1675 and 1691) was a Dutch Golden Age painter whose works were largely influenced by Rembrandt.

== Biography ==
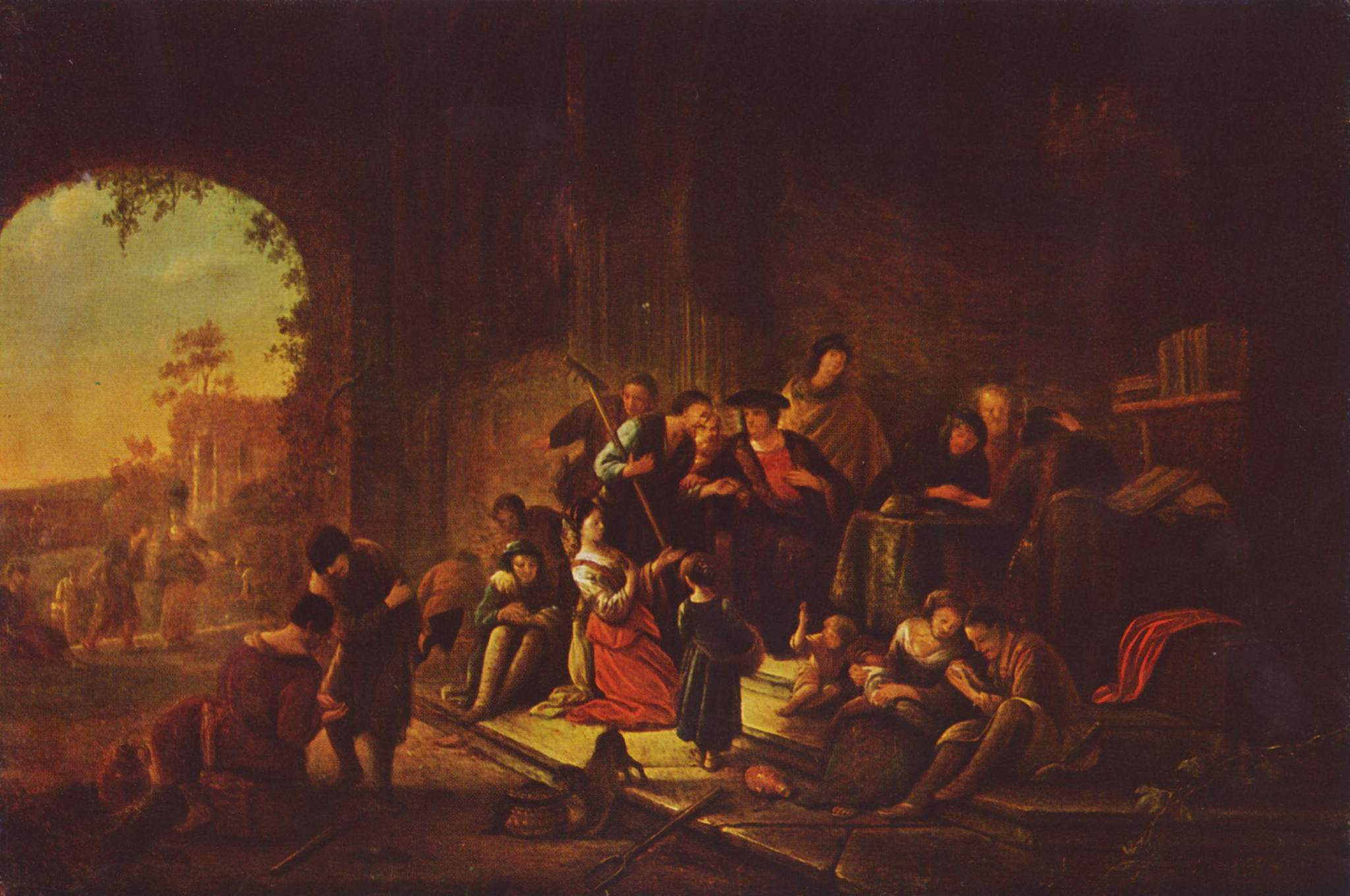
Parable of the Workers in the Vineyard.

De Wet was born and died in Haarlem. Little is known of his early life. Houbraken mentions him in passing as an art dealer of Haarlem in his biographical sketch of Philips Wouwerman, referring to him as Jan de Wet. Houbraken relates a story in which Philips Wouwerman burned his sketchbooks before his death, so that his brother Pieter wouldn't be able to use them and cash in on his name. Houbraken claimed that the story was malicious gossip, but he had heard another story that was probably closer to the truth. Apparently after Pieter van Laer had returned to Haarlem, he received less for his art than in Rome, but he refused to lower his price.

When a landscape that van Laer had made was considered too expensive by Jan de Wet (a dealer), the buyer contracted the then young Philips Wouwermans to copy it, which he did quite well. The success of this transaction launched the career of the young Wouwermans at the expense of Pieter van Laer. Houbraken heard from Michiel Carré who in turn heard it from Pieter Gerritsz van Roestraten and Jacob de Wet that guilt had forced Wouwerman to burn the proof of all of his copies before he died.

De Wet left a notebook that mentions a total of 34 pupils, most famously Paulus Potter. Other notable pupils were Job Adriaensz Berckheyde, Adriaen Jansz Kraen, Johann Philip Lemke, Jan Vermeer van Haarlem I (not to be confused with Vermeer of Delft), Jacob de Wet II, and Kort Withold. He became a member of the Haarlem Guild of St. Luke in 1632. Judging from the number of pupils, and the difficulties his son Jacob II had with launching an independent career, it seems that De Wet had a large and successful practise in Haarlem. His son Jacob II was the only one of 5 children who also became a painter.
