= Emanuel Murant =

Dutch painter (1622–1700)

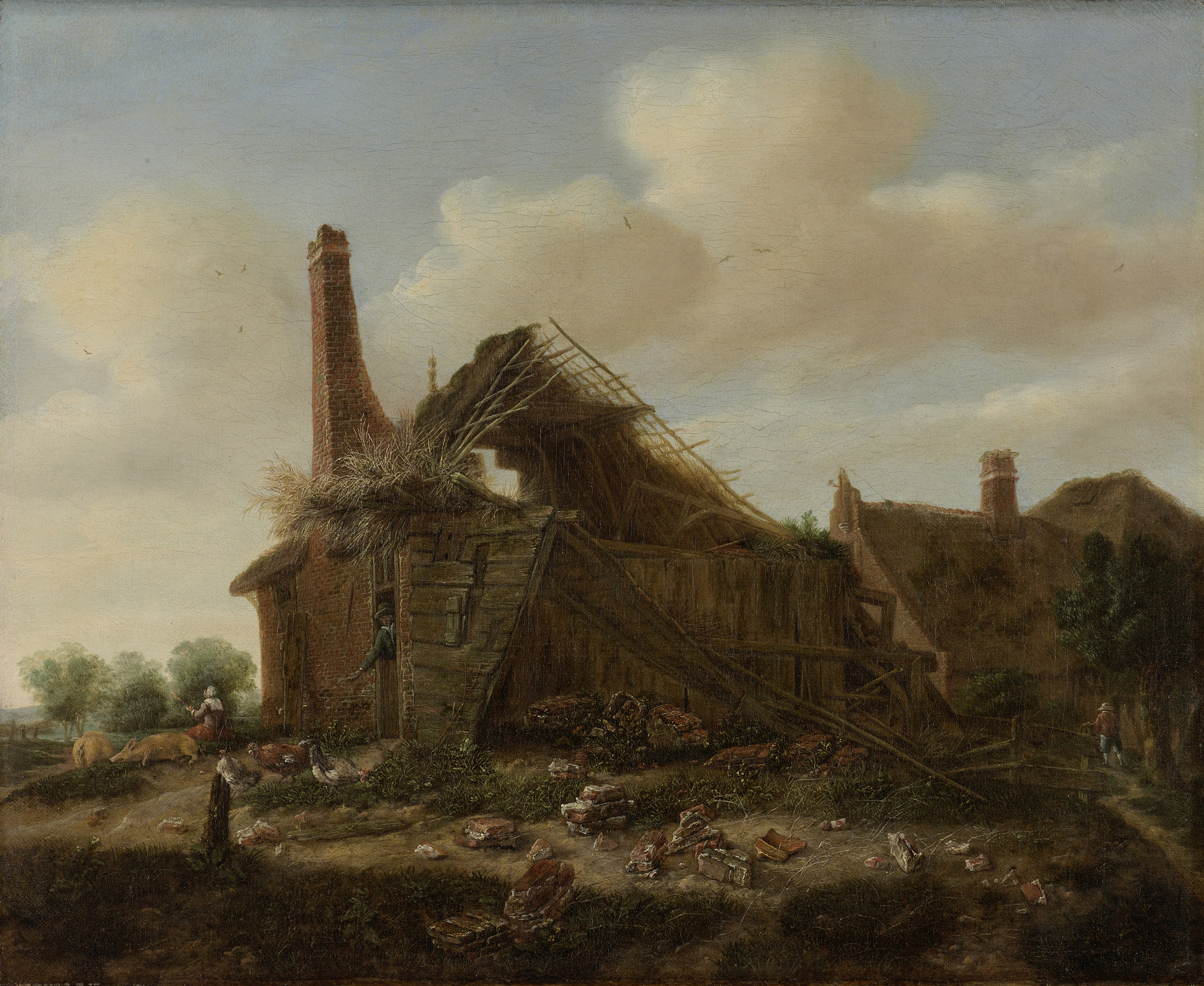
Ruined farm, 1700

Emanuel Murant (December 22, 1622 – ca.1700) is a rather unknown Dutch Golden Age painter of landscapes and houses.

== Biography ==
Manuel Murant was born in Amsterdam; his father Isaiah had studied in Calvinist Geneva, and became a teacher. The family with six children lived next to the school in the Nieuwmarkt (and Jan Pieterszoon Sweelinck).

According to Houbraken Manuel was a pupil of Philips Wouwerman in Haarlem, where he learned to paint Italianate landscapes and specialized in village scenes and ruined farmhouses that were so exact, you could count all the bricks. Houbraken also mentioned him travelling to France and other places for some years. Back home in 1649 he worked for the Admiralty. In 1654 he married his neighbour. It is not impossible he knew the young Jan van der Heyden and learned how to paint houses. Another of neighbors was Jan van de Capelle.

In 1665 he lived in Naarden. In 1670 he remarried Berberke Willems and settled in Leeuwarden, where he stayed until his death.

Murant's brother David had many of his paintings still in his possession that Houbraken saw when he was writing his book in the 1710s.
