= Lambert ten Kate =

Dutch linguist (1674–1731)

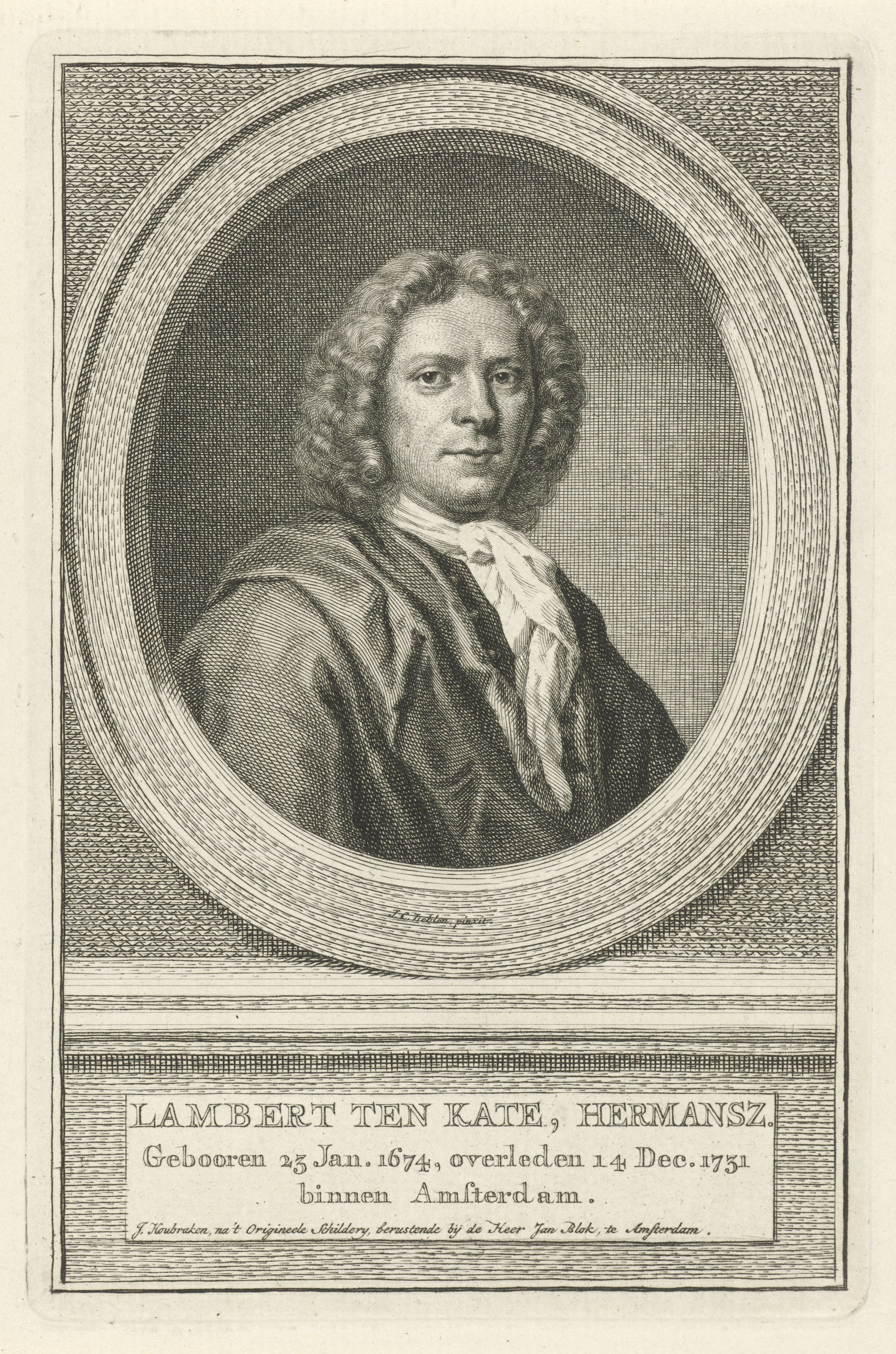
- Portrait of Lambert ten Kate (engraving by Jacob Houbraken)
- Born: 23 January 1674; Amsterdam
- Died: 14 December 1731 (aged 57); Amsterdam

Lambert ten Kate (23 January 1674 – 14 December 1731) was a Dutch linguist. Specialised in comparative historical linguistics, he was also a well-known art collector.

== Early life ==
Ten Kate was born in Amsterdam to Mennonite parents. He studied at the Haarlem Collegium Physicum and was a pupil of Adriaan Verwer.

== Career ==
Early in his career, ten Kate was a merchant, as a partner with his father, Herman ten Kate (1644–1706). The ten Kates engaged in the business of trading in corns, but it was not a preference for the younger man. He eventually left the family business, giving his attention to linguistics, especially, historical-comparative work, etymology, methodology and the standard language. An early phonetician, he wrote linguistic and theological treatises on Dutch and other Germanic languages. His first published work on linguistics was at the instigation of Verwer. In his Aenleiding tot de kennisse van het verhevene deel der Nederduitsche sprake (1723), he made scientific comparisons of older language stages. By observation of the written and spoken language of his own time, he developed linguistic rules to detect and capture language changes. As his publications were all in his native Dutch and not in Latin, he was not known internationally. His notable work, Geméénschap tussen de Gottische spraeke en de Nederduytsche ('Affinities and Similarities between the Dutch and Gothic Languages) was published anonymously in 1710. Thirteen years later, his magnum opus was a two-volume Aenleiding tot de kennisse van het verhevene deel der Nederduitsche sprake ('Introduction to the Knowledge of the Most Important Part of the Dutch Language').

== Death ==
He died of a lingering illness in Amsterdam in 1731, and was buried in the Noorderkerk.

== See also ==
- Canon of Dutch Literature
