= Adriaan Kluit =

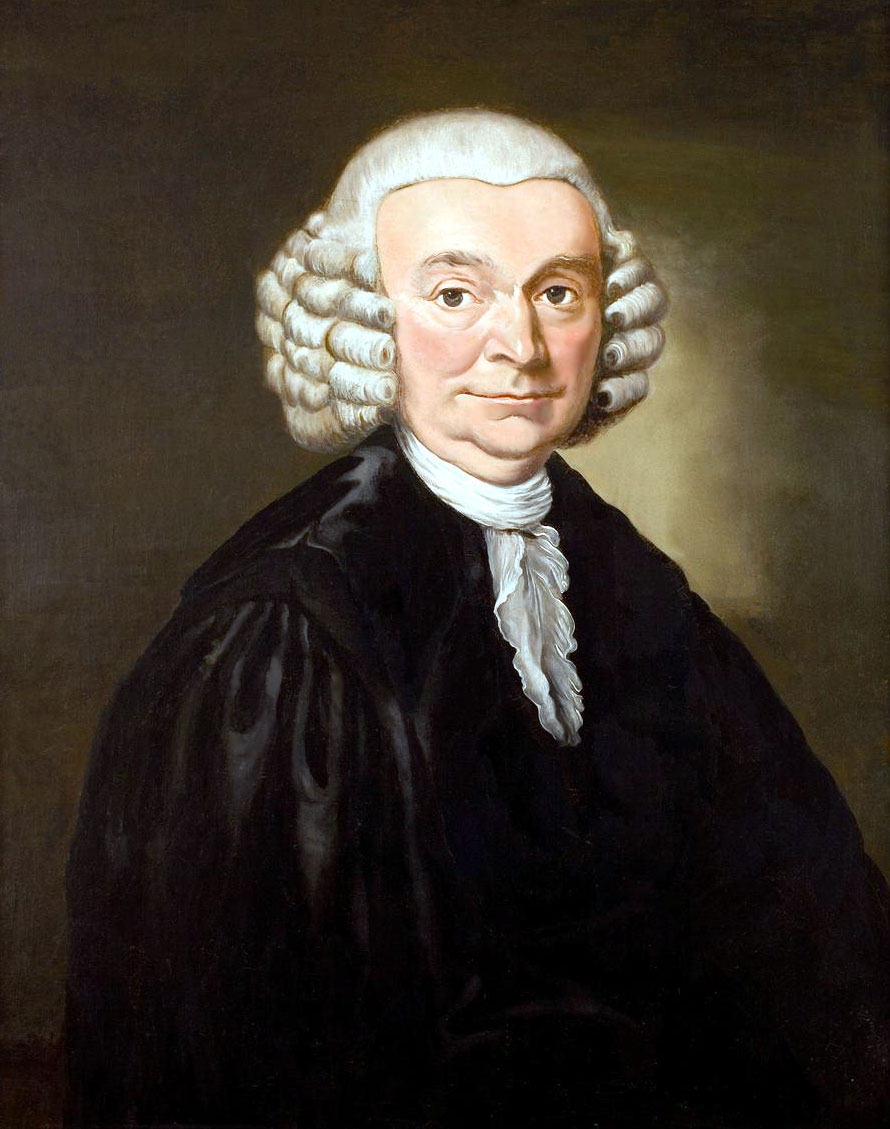
- Portrait of Adriaan Kluit from the Special Collections of the University of Leiden.
- Born: 9 February 1735, Leiden
- Died: 12 January 1807, Leiden
- Occupation: Historian
- Writing career
- Genre: history
- Notable works: Historia critica comitatus Hollandiae et Zeelandiae, Historie der Hollandsche Staatsregering tot 1795

Adriaan Kluit (9 February 1735 – 12 January 1807) was a Dutch scholar, important in Dutch linguistics. He was born in Dordrecht. He was rector of the Latin school in Alkmaar and Middelburg. In 1779 he became the professor of history at the University of Leiden, remaining there until his death.

Kluit has two major historical works to his name: Historia critica comitatus Hollandiae et Zeelandiae (published between 1777 and 1782 in Middelburg) and Historie der Hollandsche Staatsregering tot 1795 (History of the Dutch State Government until 1795, published between 1802 and 1805). In the latter, Kluit examined the origins of the states of Holland and their position from the Middle Ages until 1795 – he concluded that the states was not sovereign, but its landsheer (lord) was.

== Major works ==
- Conspectus historiae criticae Comitatus Hollandiae et Zeelandiae (Utrecht 1773).
- Historia critica Comitatus Hollandiae et Zelandiae, sistens Chronicon Hollandiae vetustissimi anonymi monachi Egmondani, cum notis Matthaei, Douzae aliorumque nec non perpetuo editoris comment. illustratum. Accedit Codex diplomaticus et probationes 2 Vols. (Middelburg 1777–1784); (Vol. 1); (Vol. 2).
- Inwijingsrede over 't recht 't welk de Nederlanders gehad hebben om hunnen wettigen vorst en Heer Philips, koning van Spanje, af te zweren, uit het Latijn (Leiden 1779).(Online)
- Primae lineae collegii diplomatico-historico-politici sistentes vetus jus publicum Belgicum, historice enarratum et ex antiquis monumentis et veteris aevi diplomatibus illustratum (Leiden 1780) (Online)
- Academische redevoering over het Misbruik van het algemeen Staatsrecht, of over de nadelen en onheilen, die uit het misbruik in de beoefeninge voor alle burgermaatschappijen te wachten zijn (Leiden 1784/1787).
- De Souvereiniteit der Staten van Holland verdedigd tegen de hedendaagsche leer der volksregering, voornamelijk tegen het geschrift: Grondwettige herstelling van Nederlands Staatswezen (Leiden 1785/1788).
- Historiae foederum Belgii Foederati primae lineae 3 Vols. (Leiden 1790–1791); (Vol. 1); (Vol. 2); (Vol. 3)
- Index chronologicus sive Prodomus ad primas lineas historiae federum Belgii Federati (Leiden 1790) (Online).
- De Rechten van den mensch in Frankrijk geen gewaande Rechten in Nederland (Amsterdam 1793) (Online).
- Iets over den laatsten Engelschen oorlog met de republiek, en over Nederlands Koophandel (Amsterdam 1794) (Online).
- Historie der Hollandsche Staatsregeling tot aan het jaar 1795, met Bijlagen 5 Vols. (Amsterdam 1802–1805); (Vol. 1); (Vol. 2); (Vol. 3); (Vol. 4); (Vol. 5).

== Bibliography ==
- Koen Stapelbroek, Ida H. Stamhuis & Paul M.M. Klep, 'Adriaan Kluit's statistics and the future of the Dutch state from a European perspective', History of European Ideas 36(2) (2010) 217–235.
- Igor van de Built, Landkaartschrijvers en landverdelers. Adriaen Verwer, Adriaan Kluit en de Nederlandse taalkunde van de achttiende eeuw (Amsterdam 2009).
- Wyger Velema, 'Contemporary Reactions to Patriot Political Discourse', in idem, Republicans: Essays on Eighteenth-century Dutch Political Thought (Boston 2007).
- Ivo Schöffer, 'Adriaan Kluit, een voorganger', Afscheidscollege Rijksuniversiteit Leiden (Leiden 1988).
- Theo Veen, 'De legitimatie van de souvereiniteit der Staten bij Huber en Kluit', Bijdragen en Mededelingen betreffende de Geschiedenis der Nederlanden 97 (Den Haag 1982) 185–215.
- F.W.N. Hugenholtz, 'Adriaan Kluit en het onderwijs in de medievistiek', in P.A.M. Geurts en A.E.M. Jansen (red.), Geschiedschrijving in Nederland (Den Haag 1981) 143–164.
- A.Th. van Deursen, 'Geschiedenis en toekomstverwachting. Het onderwijs in de statistiek aan de universiteiten van de achttiende eeuw' in: P.A.M. Geurts & A.E.M. Janssen (red.), Geschiedschrijving in Nederland (Den Haag, 1971/1981).
- E.V. Vrij, 'Het collegegeschil tussen de hoogleraren Adriaan Kluit en Jean Luzac', Leids Jaarboekje 63 (1971) 121–142.
- Otto van Rees, 'Het collegie van Adriaan Kluit over de statistiek van Nederland', Tijdschrift voor Staathuishoudkunde en statistiek 12 (1855) 245–262.
