= Adriaen Jansz Kraen =

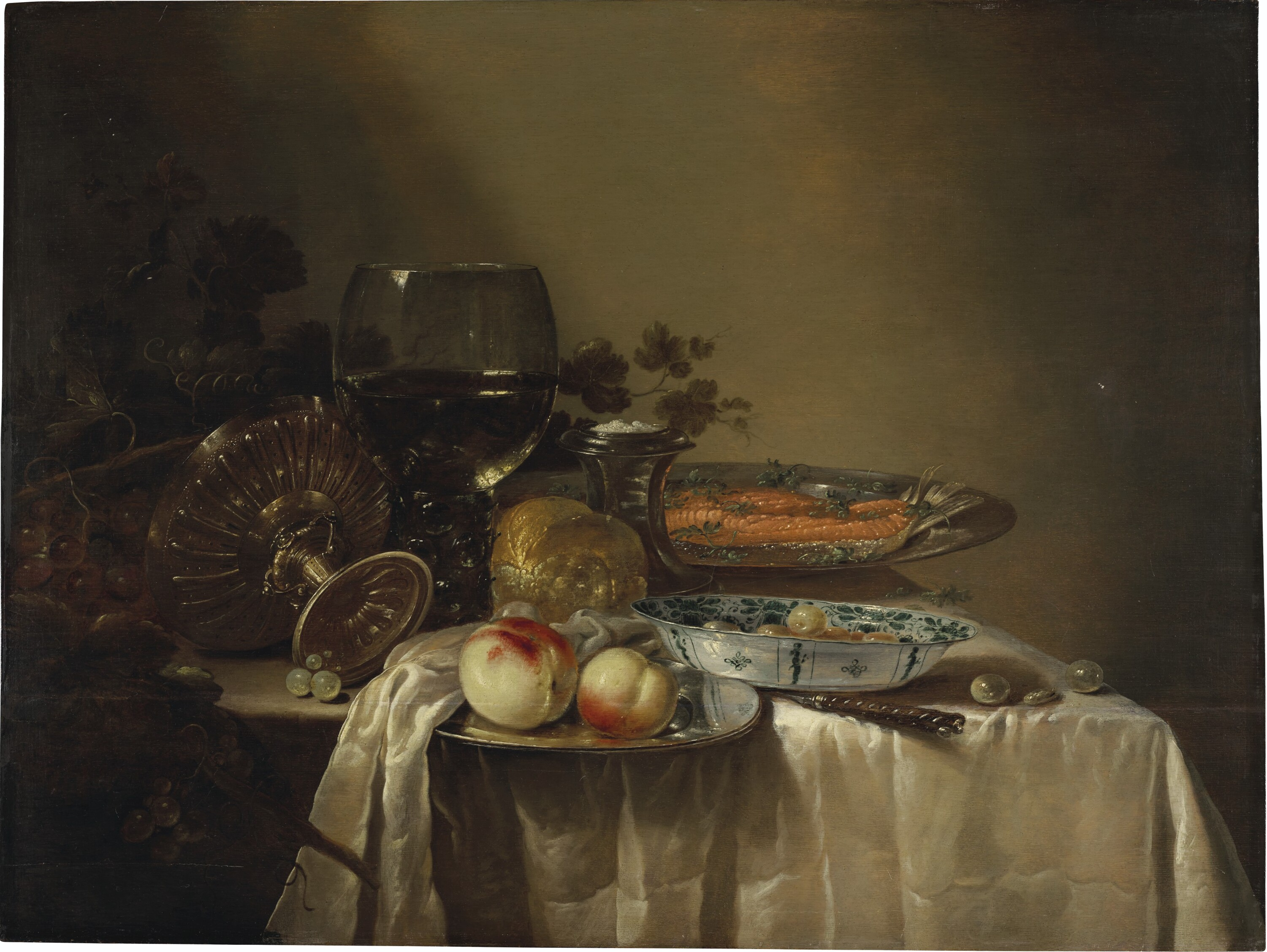
Still life with a roemer

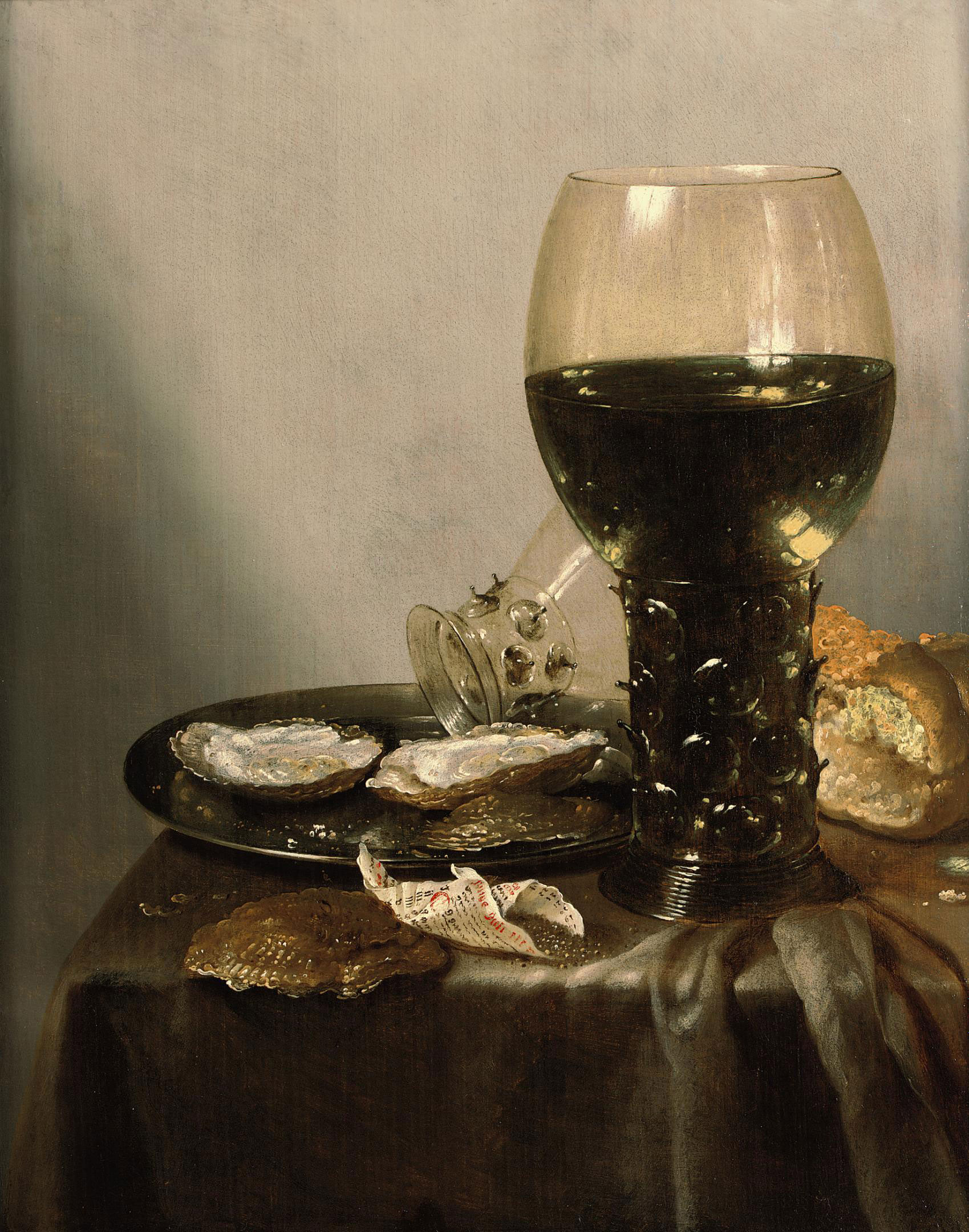
Still life with roemers, oysters, bread, and pepper

Adriaen Jansz Kraen (1619, Haarlem – 1679, Haarlem), was a Dutch still life painter.

== Biography ==
In 1637 he joined the Haarlem Guild of St. Luke and in 1638 he is recorded in their books as the pupil of Jacob Willemszoon de Wet. He married his master's sister, Maria de Wet, on 13 August 1641. In 1642 he became master in the guild. His works are often confused with other Haarlem still life painters such as Pieter Claesz and Willem Claesz Heda.
