= Adriaan Pelt =

Dutch journalist, international civil servant and diplomat

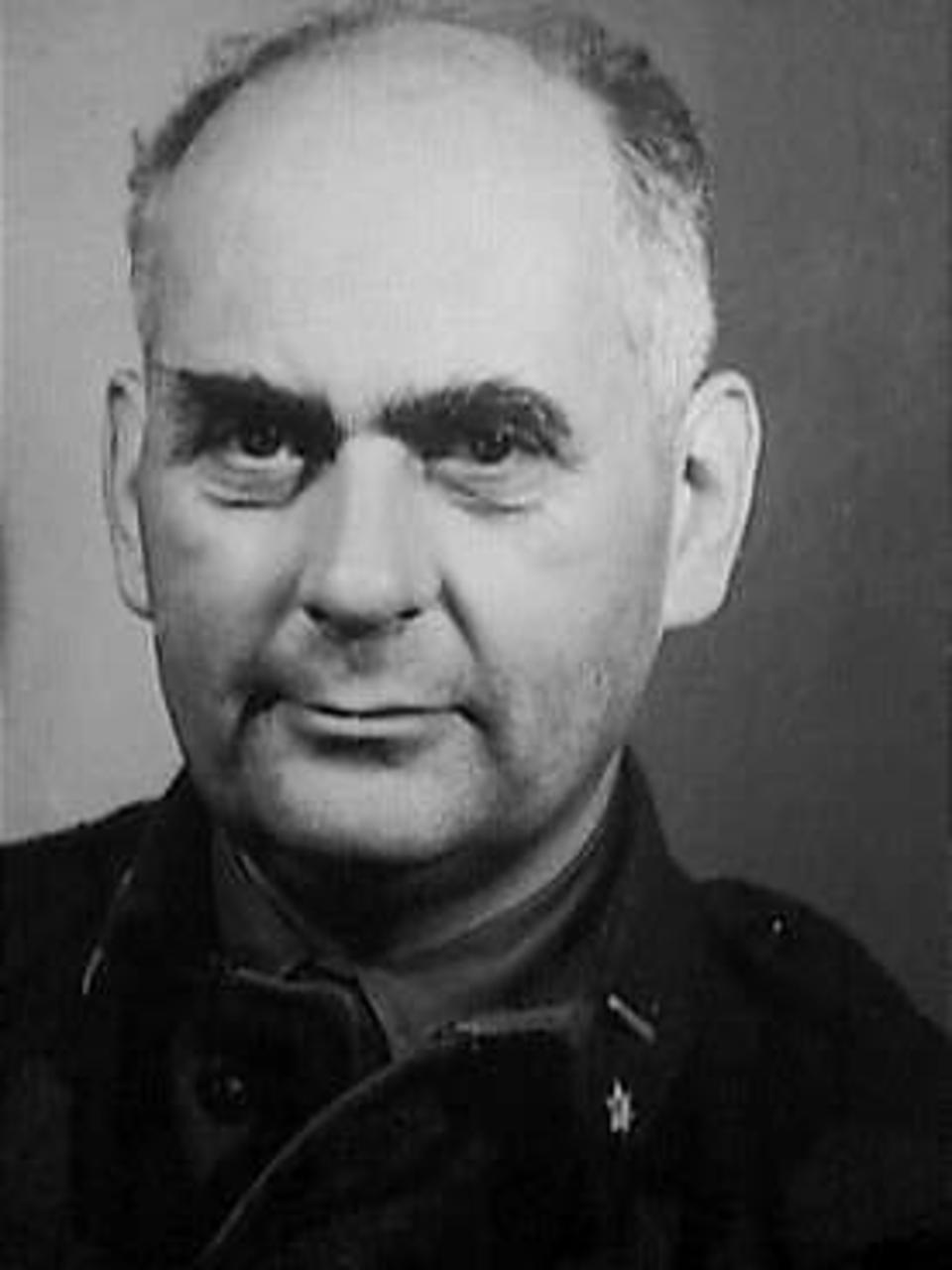
Pelt in London (1940s)

Adriaan Pelt (8 May 1892 – 11 April 1981) was a Dutch journalist, international civil servant and diplomat, most famous for drafting the post war constitution of Libya.

As a reporter for the newspaper De Telegraaf he lived during the First World War in London and Paris. There he studied diplomacy at the École Libre des Sciences Politiques. He married a Frenchwoman.

From 1920 to 1940 he worked as an adviser to the League of Nations and from 1934 as head of information. He visited many of the inter-war trouble spots in the world, such as Manchuria and India.

During the Second World War he was head of the Government Press Office, later Netherlands Government Information Service (RVD, Rijksvoorlichtingsdienst now), in London. There he founded the Anep Aneta-on, the free counterpart to the Algemeen Nederlands Persbureau (ANP) in the occupied territories. He started radio Orange Brandaris broadcasting Dutch programs to the occupied territories using English channels. And he also helped monitor the Dutch Radio news.

In 1945 he went San Francisco with the Dutch delegation to help draft the United Nations Charter. Early 1946 following his election as Under-Secretary-General, under Trygve Lie, he was responsible for UN conferences and general services, and later for European issues.

On 10 December 1949 he was appointed High Commissioner for Libya by the UN. He was the last of the colonial heads of Libya. He brought together the English regions of Tripolitania and Cyrenaica, with the French region of Fezzan to form a Libyan state, before its independence on 1 January 1952. He successfully brought together the tribes and peoples from the three regions, they helped with administration and drawing up a constitution.

The mutual distrust of the people who had to form the new state was great. Even so, Pelt timely drafting of a constitution, and on 24 December he transferred state power to King Idris. He returned to the headquarters of the UN, and from 1952 until his retirement in 1957 was director of the European Office of the UN in Geneva.

Adriaan Pelt became very popular in Libya, and a main street in Benghazi is named after him.

== Publications (selection) ==
- Adrian Pelt: Libyan independence and the United Nations. A case of planned decolonization (Foreword by U Thant). Yale University Press, New Haven, 1970. ISBN 0300012160
- Ismail Raghib Khalidi: Constitutional development in Libya (Foreword by A. Pelt). Beirut, 1956.
