= Adriaan Bonsel =

Dutch composer (1918–2011)

Adriaan Bonsel (4 August 1918 - 9 July 2011) was a Dutch composer. He was born in Hilversum, Netherlands, and died at the age of 92 in Amersfoort, Netherlands.

== Education ==
Bonsel studied the flute at the Amsterdam Conservatory and studied composition with Jan Koetsier.

== Professional Activities ==
Bonsel was principal flautist of the Radio Philharmonic Orchestra at its inception in 1945. He was a co-founder of the Radio Philharmonic Sextet. He was also a professor of flute at Utrecht Conservatory and the conductor of the Faso Flute Ensemble. Bonsel composed works that were commissioned by the Dutch Ministry of Education, Arts and Sciences, the AVRO, the Dutch Radio Union, the Dutch Pipers Guild, and the Johan Wagenaar Foundation, among others.

His students include Mirjam Nastasi, Professor of Flute at University of Freiburg.

== Compositions ==
- Suite for flute and string orchestra (1947)
- Folkloristische Suite for winds and percussion (1958), part of the repertoire of the Eastman Wind Ensemble.
- Jozef in Dothan (1958)
- Suite voor blokfluit en clavecimbel of hobo en piano (1958)
- Symphony No. 2 for orchestra (1959)
- Souvenir for flute solo (1959)
- Elegie for viola solo (1961)
- Mijn moeder Kenau (1962)
- Mariken van Nimweghen (1962)
- Een moeilijk mens (1963)
- Vrede - oorlog - vrede? (1975)
- Suite populaire for orchestra (1983)
- Suite for bamboo flute ensemble and string orchestra (1988)

== Awards ==
In 1947, Bonsel was awarded the Music Prize of the City of Amsterdam for his Suite for Flute and String Orchestra.

In 1983, he won a composition competition in Würzburg, Germany, for his Suite Populaire.
