= Philips Wouwerman =

Dutch painter (1619–1668)

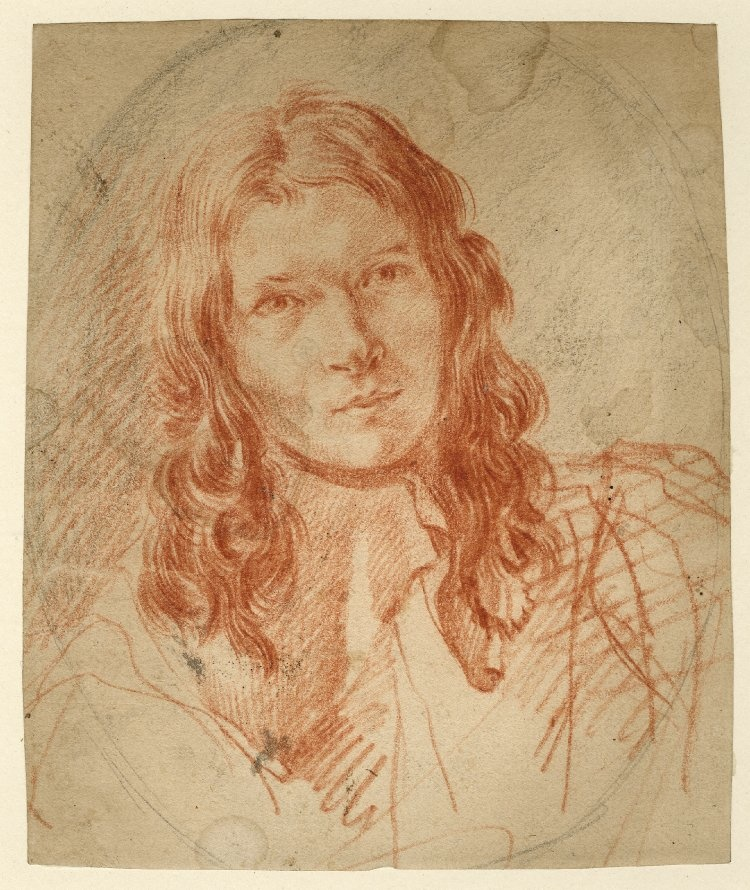
- Self-Portrait, c. 1640, red chalk on paper, British Museum, London
- Born: 24 May 1619, Haarlem
- Died: 19 May 1668 (aged 48), Haarlem
- Known for: Painting

Philips Wouwerman (also Wouwermans) (24 May 1619 (baptized) – 19 May 1668) was a Dutch painter of hunting, landscape and battle scenes. He became prolific during the Dutch Golden Age and joined the Haarlem Guild of St. Luke.

== Life and work ==
Philips Wouwerman was a versatile and prolific artist from the Dutch Golden Age. Embedded in the artistic environment and tradition of his home town of Haarlem, Wouwerman made a significant contribution to seventeenth-century Dutch painting. His pictures were in demand during his lifetime, and even more sought after in the 18th century. Throughout Europe, formerly princely art collections like in Dresden and St. Petersburg still bear witness to this widespread admiration of Wouwerman's art.

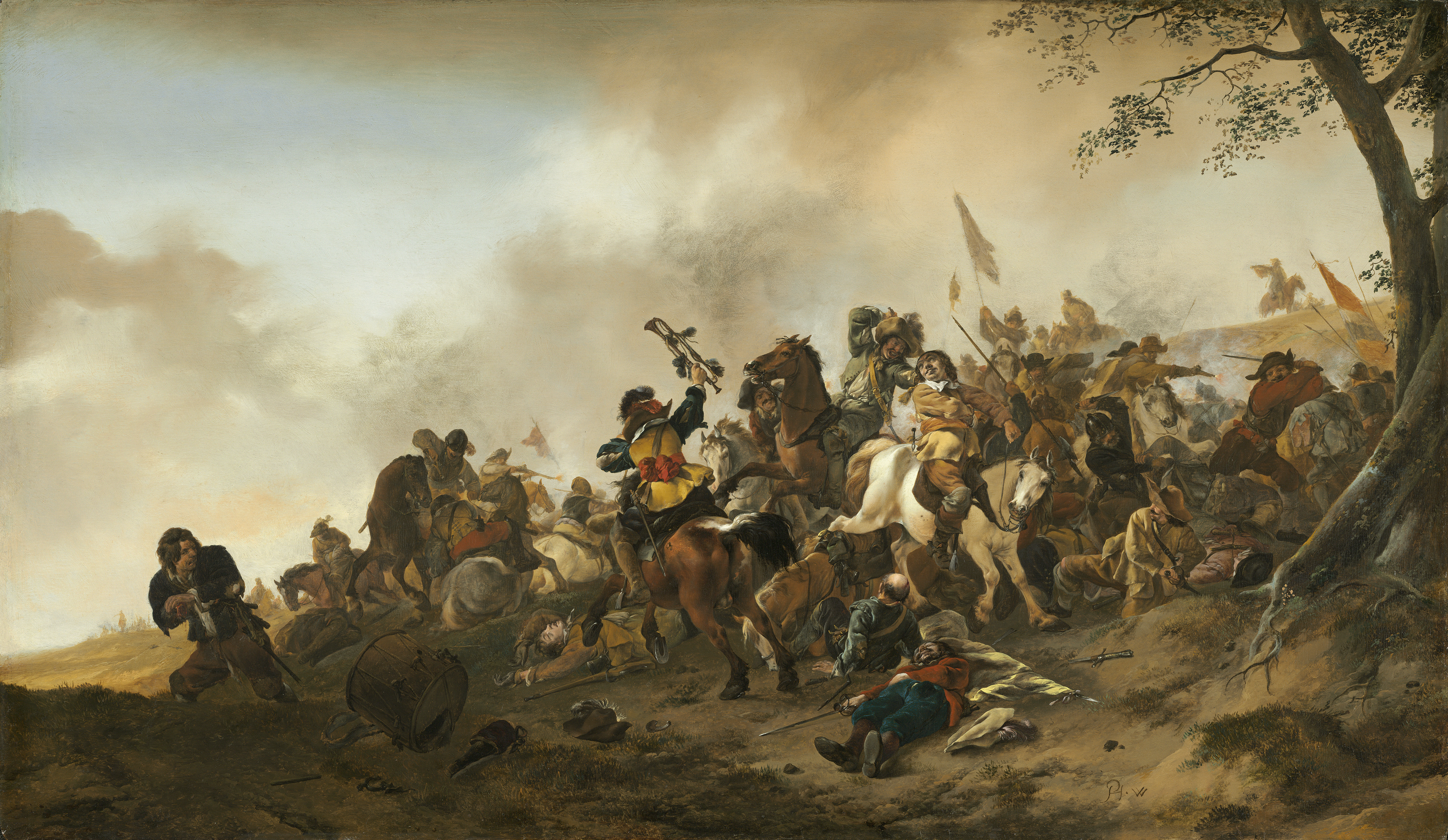
Battle scene

Born in Haarlem in 1619, the son of a now altogether obscure painter named Pouwels Joostsz Wouwerman, little is known of his artistic schooling. According to Cornelis de Bie, he studied with Frans Hals (1581/85–1666), but the particular style of Hals didn't leave a footmark on his oeuvre. Apart from a short stay in Hamburg at the end of the 1630s, Wouwerman seemed to have lived in Haarlem during his whole artistic career and died as a prosperous member of the community at the age of 48. He joined the Haarlem Guild of St. Luke in 1640 and here took on several official posts in the years to come. Wouwerman also worked as an estate agent in his home town, as many documents in Haarlem archives mentioned the artist in this context.

Wouwerman started his artistic career with simple depictions of everyday life in the tradition of the bamboccianti by Pieter van Laer (1592/99–after 1642). His paintings of the mid-1640s often feature a diagonal slope of land, a tree which functions as a repoussoir, and figures accompanied by horses. Over the next thirty years he developed an individual style, treating a wide range of subjects from genre and landscape to military and religious scenes (equestrian scenes, hunting and hawking parties, landscapes with travellers, cavalry battles and military encampments, peasants festivities etc.). He is noted for his skill in the depiction of horses of all breeds seen in motion. The art historian Frederik J. Duparc calls Wouwerman "undoubtedly the most accomplished and successful 17th-century Dutch painter of horses". The masterpieces from his best period (around 1650–1660) are of indisputably high quality, beautifully combining imaginary southern landscapes and a typically Dutch atmosphere. Wouwerman's paintings are characterized by subdued colours, a cool atmosphere and a wealth of witty, anecdotal details. He died in Haarlem.

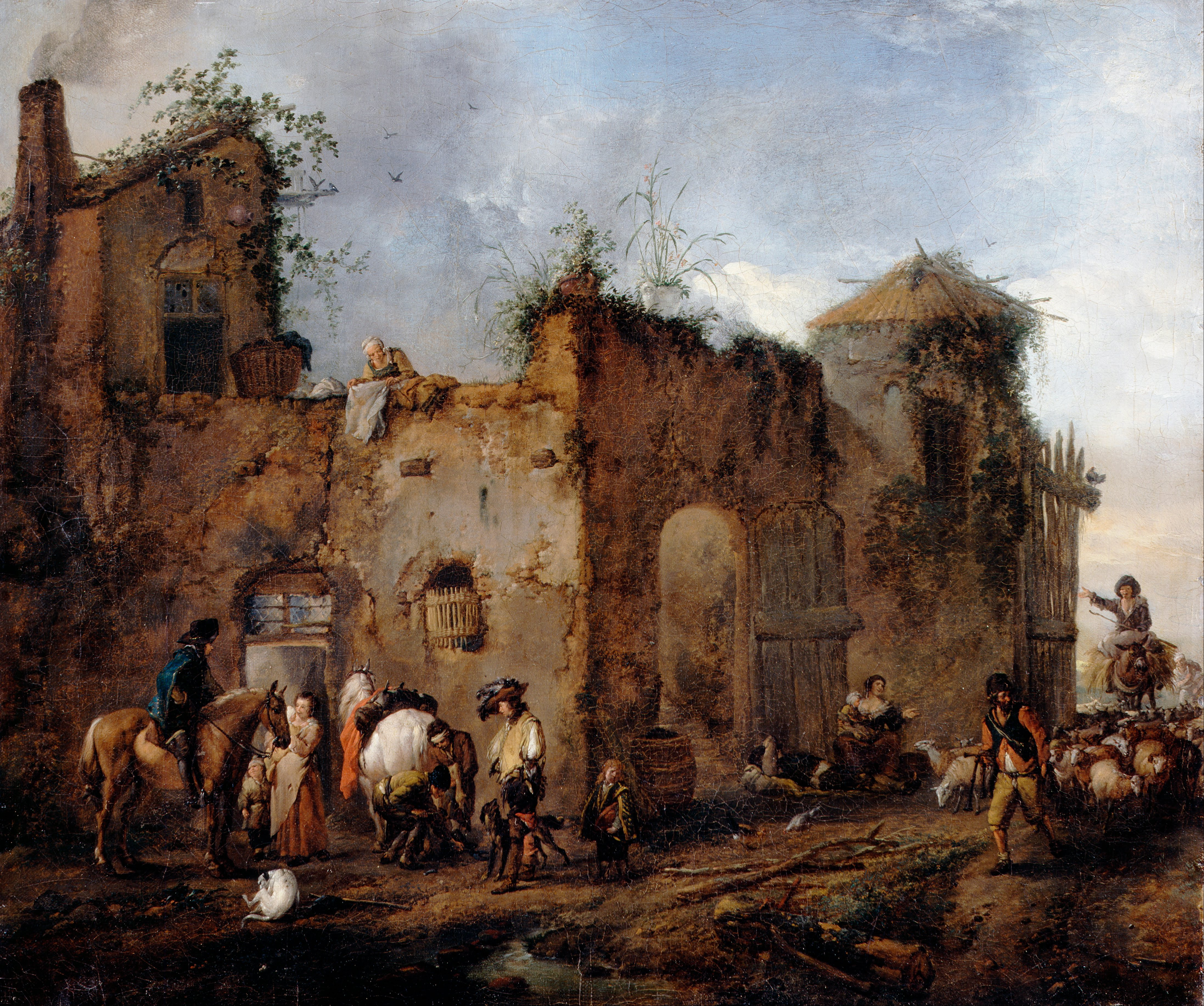
Courtyard with a farrier shoeing a horse

The first retrospective exhibition of Philips Wouwerman's work took place in Kassel, Gemäldegalerie Alte Meister, and in The Hague, The Royal Picture Gallery Mauritshuis, 2009/2010.

== Family ==
At an early age, Wouwerman married Anna Pietersz. van Broeckhoff with whom he had ten children. They lived on the Bakenessergracht in a house that was also lived in by Haarlem painters Cornelis Gerritsz Decker and Hendrik de Meijer. Seven of the Wouwerman children survived and, after the death of their mother in 1670, accepted a substantial inheritance.

== Output ==
About 800 pictures were listed in John Smith's Catalogue raisonné (1829/1842) as the work of Philip Wouwerman. In Hofstede de Groot's enlarged Catalogue (1908) the number exceeds to 1200. In Birgit Schumacher's recently published Catalogue raisonné (2006), only about 570 pictures were listed as authentic works, as many of the pictures mentioned by Hofstede de Groot were actually painted by countless followers and imitators all over Europe. Jan and Pieter Wouwerman, the younger brothers of Philips, were often regarded as close followers whose pictures seemed to have been frequently attributed to Philips.

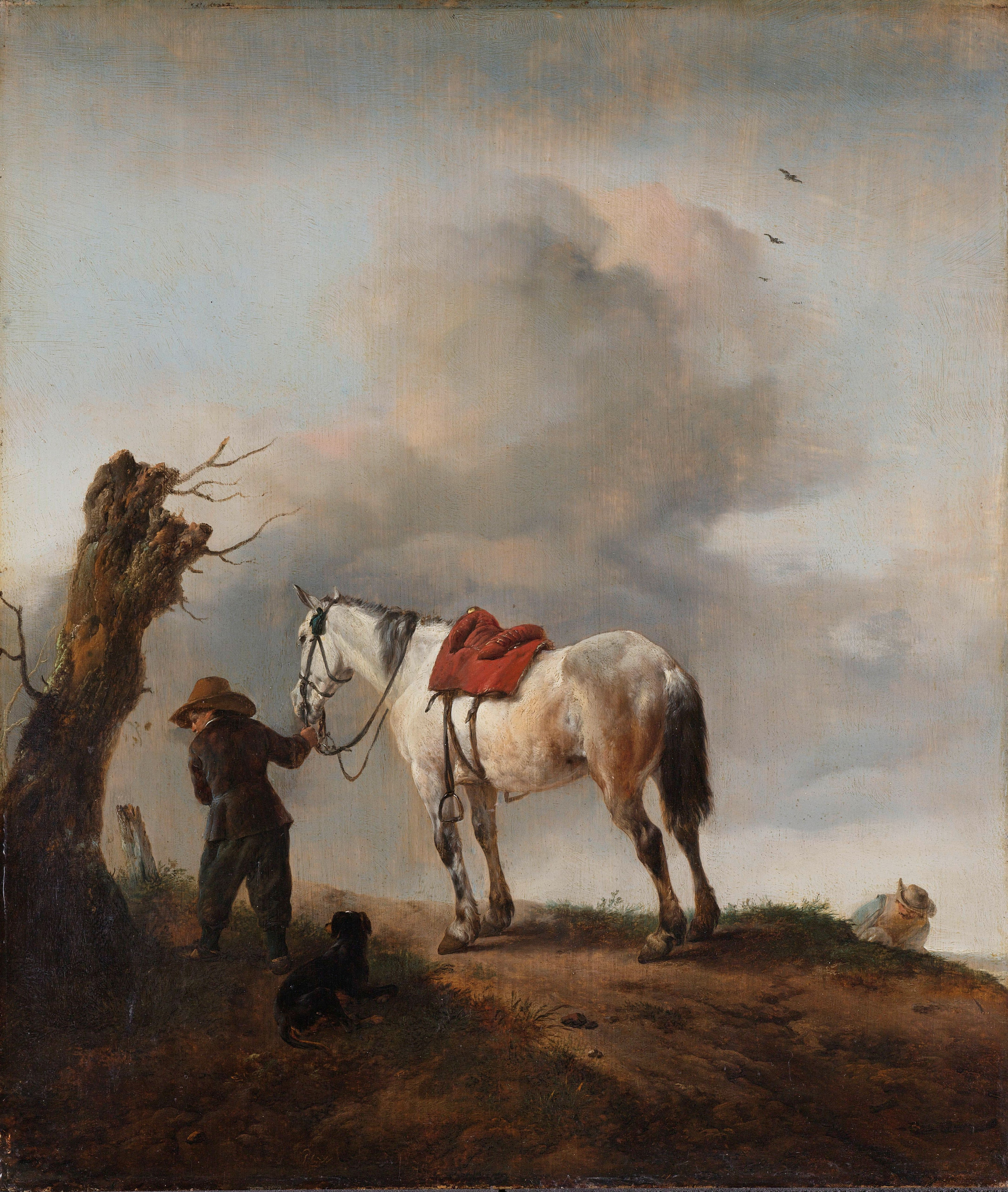
The white horse

The oeuvre of Pieter (1623–1682) clearly manifests the influence of Philips with regard to the range of subjects, but regarding the artistic style, Pieter had quite one of his own. And Jan (1629–1666) was a rather autonomous landscape painter. Out of the countless followers, some of the most gifted artists working in Wouwerman's style are worth mentioning: Jan van Huchtenburgh (1647–1733), the brothers Jan Frans (1683–1750) and Joseph van Bredael (1688–1739) as well as Carel van Falens (1683–1733).

His registered pupils were Johannes van der Bent, Hendrick Berckman, Eduard Dubois, Nicolas Ficke, Barent Gael, Anthony de Haen, Emanuel Murant, Matthias Scheits, Kort Withold, and his brothers.

== Selected works ==
- The White Horse, panel, 43.9 x 37.6 cm, Amsterdam, Rijksmuseum
- Horse and Dismounted Rider, panel, 32.3 x 36.2 cm, 1646, Leipzig, Museum der bildenden Künste
- Landscape with River and Bathers, canvas, 59 x 82 cm, Vaduz-Vienna, The Collections of the Prince of Liechtenstein
- Festive Peasants in an Extensive Landscape, canvas, 70 x 112 cm, 1653, Minneapolis, The Minneapolis Institute of Arts
- Winter Landscape with Wooden Bridge, panel, 28.5 x 36.5 cm, Berlin, Staatliche Museen, Gemäldegalerie
- A Horse Stable, canvas, 47 x 67 cm, London, The National Gallery
- The Rider's Halting Place, panel, 35.4 x 30.7 cm, Antwerp, Royal Museum of Fine Arts
- The Apple Grey at a Blacksmith, panel, 34.4. x 38.3 cm, Kassel, Gemäldegalerie Alte Meister
- Riding School and Watering Place, canvas, 82.5 x 127 cm, Vienna, Kunsthistorisches Museum
- Departure for the Hunt, panel, 45 x 64 cm, Dresden, Gemäldegalerie Alte Meister
- Landscape with a Hawking Party, canvas, 76 x 105 cm, Madrid, Museo Nacional del Prado
- Battle at a Mountainous Fortress, canvas, 69 x 82 cm, Dresden, Gemäldegalerie Alte Meister
- Cavalry at a Sutler's Booth, panel, 49.5 x 44.4 cm, London, Her Majesty Queen Elizabeth II., Buckingham Palace
- Lady and Gentleman at a Harbour, canvas, 51 x 71.3 cm, St Petersburg, The State Hermitage
- The Ascension of Christ, canvas, 85 x 68 cm, Brunswick, Herzog Anton Ulrich-Museum
