= Adriaen van Bergen =

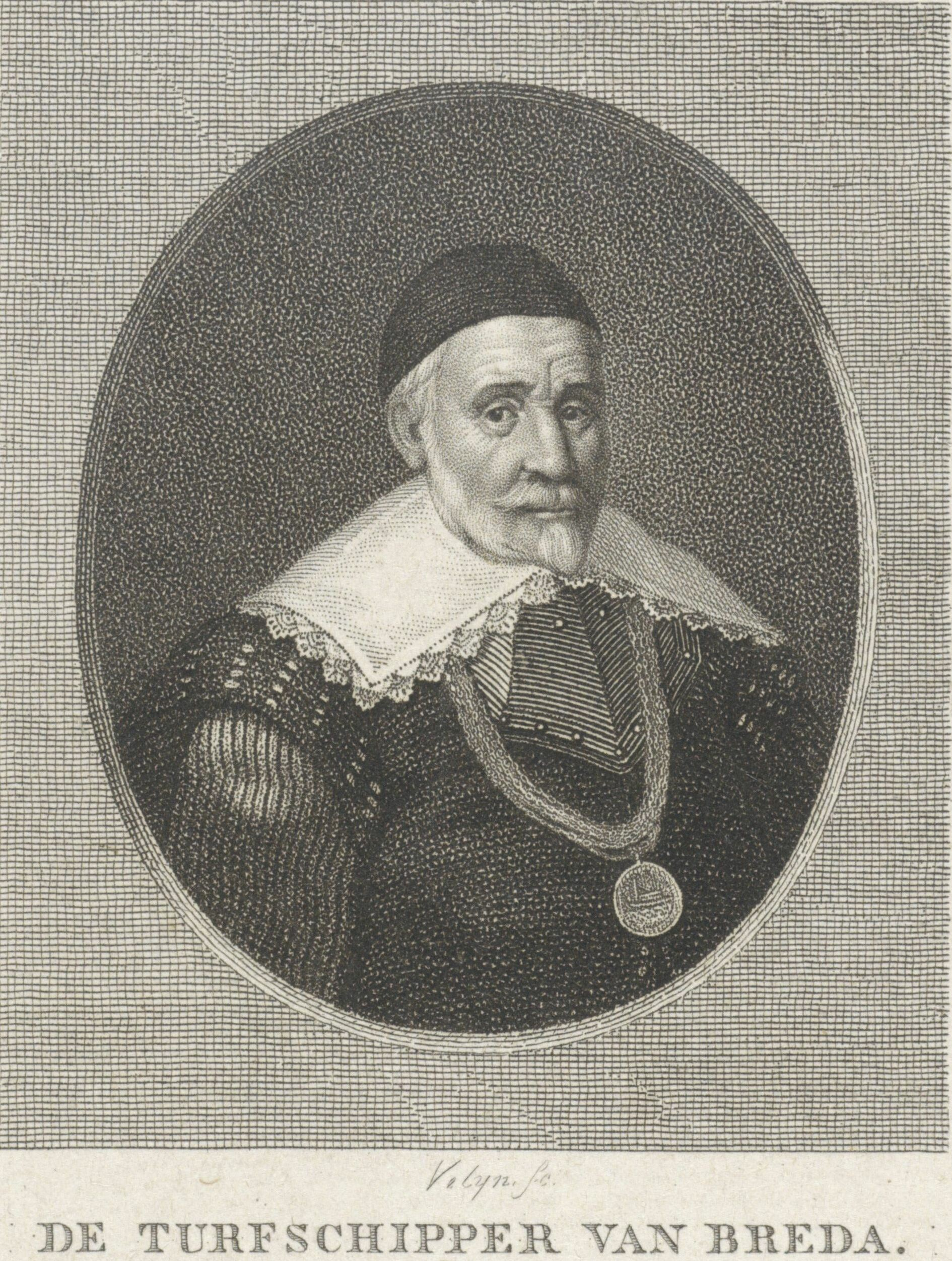
Portrait of Adriaen van Bergen by Philippus Velijn

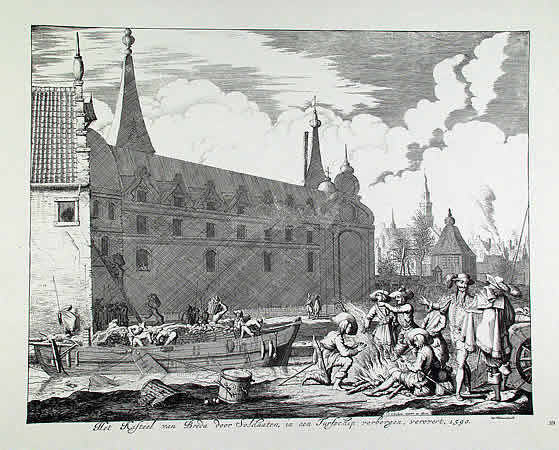
The Turfschip van Breda

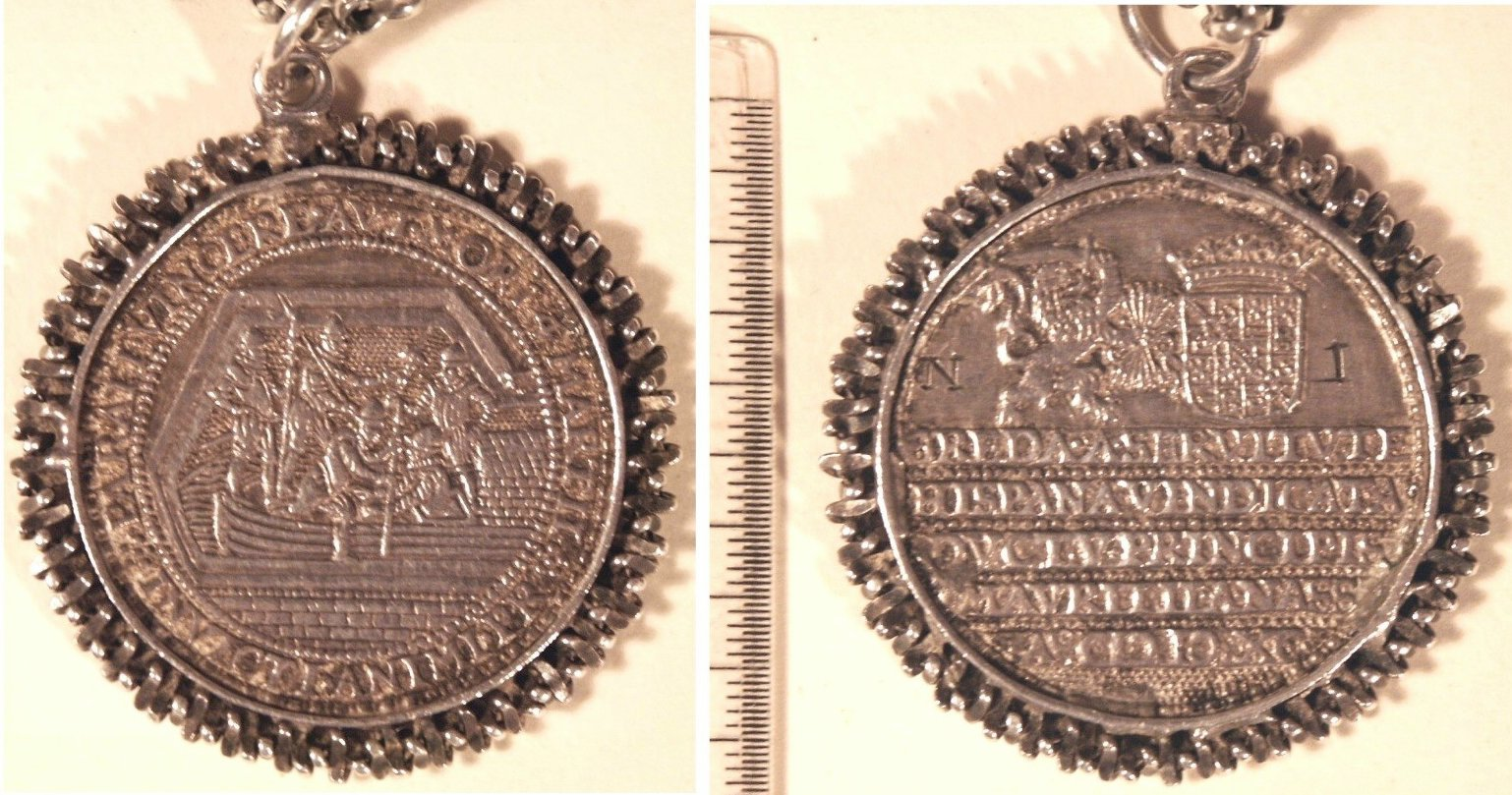
Cast silver medal by G. van Bijlaar, 1590, on the success of the "Turfschip", set in original "stekelvarkenrand" (hedgehog border) with eyelet. This way the medal proudly could be worn. Engraved initials N and I, maybe for one of the participants in the raid.

Adriaen van Bergen was a Dutch skipper from Leur, who devised the plot to recapture the city of Breda from the Spanish during the Eighty Years' War. In February 1590, he approached Prince Maurice with a Trojan Horse-type plan.

In February 1590, during the Capture of Breda a nobleman from Cambrai, Charles de Heraugiere, under orders from Maurice of Nassau, was to make a covert reconnoiter of Breda. Disguised as a fisherman he was hoping to enter Breda and to study its weaknesses, garrison strength, and general conditions. Heraugiere contacted Adriaen van Bergen, loyal to the Dutch by trade who was used to entering and leaving Breda with a barge loaded with peat. Heraugiere went into the city, hidden between the peat of the barge along with a small group of soldiers, and discovered how easy it was as none of the garrison checked the barge. When they were in the heart of Breda they made a hasty exit with enough peat to keep them covered. Heraugiere soon realized a Trojan Horse style attack was too good an opportunity to miss and thus reported it to Maurice as soon as they returned.

Adriaen van Bergen's grandson Adriaen van der Donck played an important role at the colonization of New Netherland.

== See also ==
- Siege of Breda (1590)
