= Adriaan Nicolaas Petrus Pelzer =

South African Afrikaans academic, historian, author and Professor

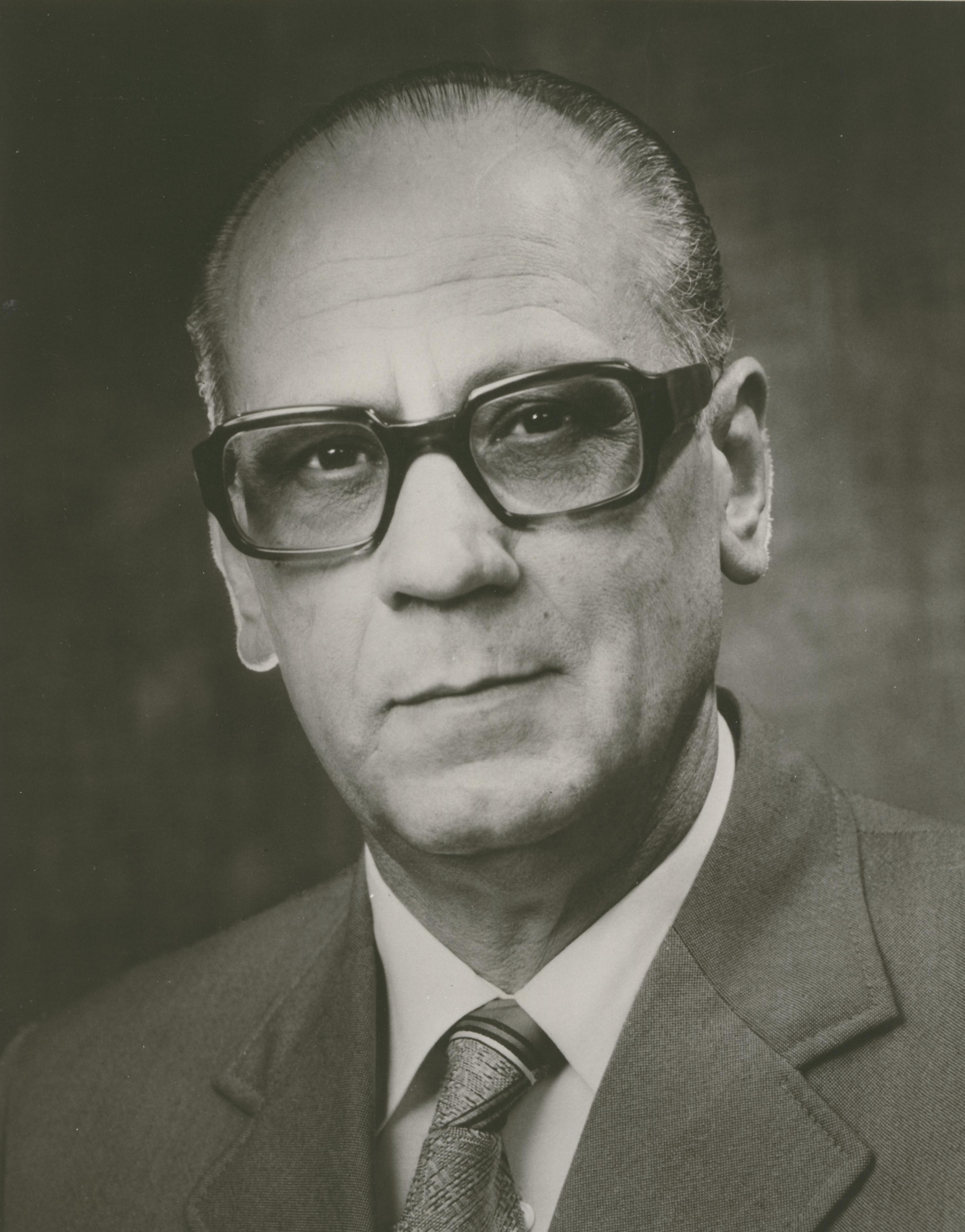
Adriaan N Pelzer – 1978

Adriaan Nicolaas Petrus Pelzer (25 December 1915 – 15 October 1981) was a South African Afrikaans academic, historian, author and Professor at the University of Pretoria, South Africa. He retired from the University of Pretoria as vice rector and acting rector in 1980. Among the books he published are the following "The Afrikaner-Broederbond: First 50 Years (1980)" and "Verwoerd Speaks: Speeches 1948–1966 (1966)". He was also member of the "National Monuments Council" and in 1978 received the Laureate Award from the University of Pretoria. The Laureate Award is the highest award granted by the University of Pretoria. From 1965 to 1978 he was vice president and a member of the executive committee of the Northern-Transvaal Rugby Union, and a life member from 1979.

== Biography ==
=== Early life and education ===
Adriaan Nicolaas Petrus Pelzer (called Attie) was born 25 December 1915 in the South African town of Ermelo. He grew up on a farm called “Voorsorg” (Provision) in the district of Estantia in Ermelo, South Africa.

He finished school in 1932 and in 1933 continued his studies as a student at the University of Pretoria (UP) and the student house of "Sonop" (Sunrise) and received his bachelor's degree (BA-degree) cum laude with major subjects Afrikaans and History. Two years later in 1937 he obtained simultaneously a master's degree in history and an advanced certificate in education, both cum laude.

=== Academic career ===
After receiving a bursary from the University for postgraduate studies, he decided to travel to Amsterdam in 1938 and enrol at the University of Amsterdam. He was supposed to receive his PhD degree on 10 May 1940, but two weeks prior to that, he took the last boat out of the Netherlands back to South Africa as WWII swept over Europe and the German invasion of the Netherlands seemed imminent.

Back in South Africa he took up teaching in a school in the town of Vereeniging from 1940 to 1941. Fortunately also in this time his completed PhD dissertation (from the time in Amsterdam) was accepted at the University of Pretoria and he was awarded the degree in April 1941. From here he was appointed as a lecturer in the department of History at the University of Pretoria in January 1942, and in 1946 as Senior Lector and in 1947 as Professor and head of the department. He served as Dean from October 1954 to 31 March 1970 for the Faculty of Arts and Literature. On 1 April 1970 he joined the university administration and on 1 July 1970 was appointed as Registrar and head of the Academic Registration. He held this post till 1 January 1974 when he was appointed as first Vice-rector of the University of Pretoria. He held this post till retirement at the end of the academic year in 1980, while for the preceding two years was also standing in as acting rector for the University of Pretoria.

=== Membership and awards ===
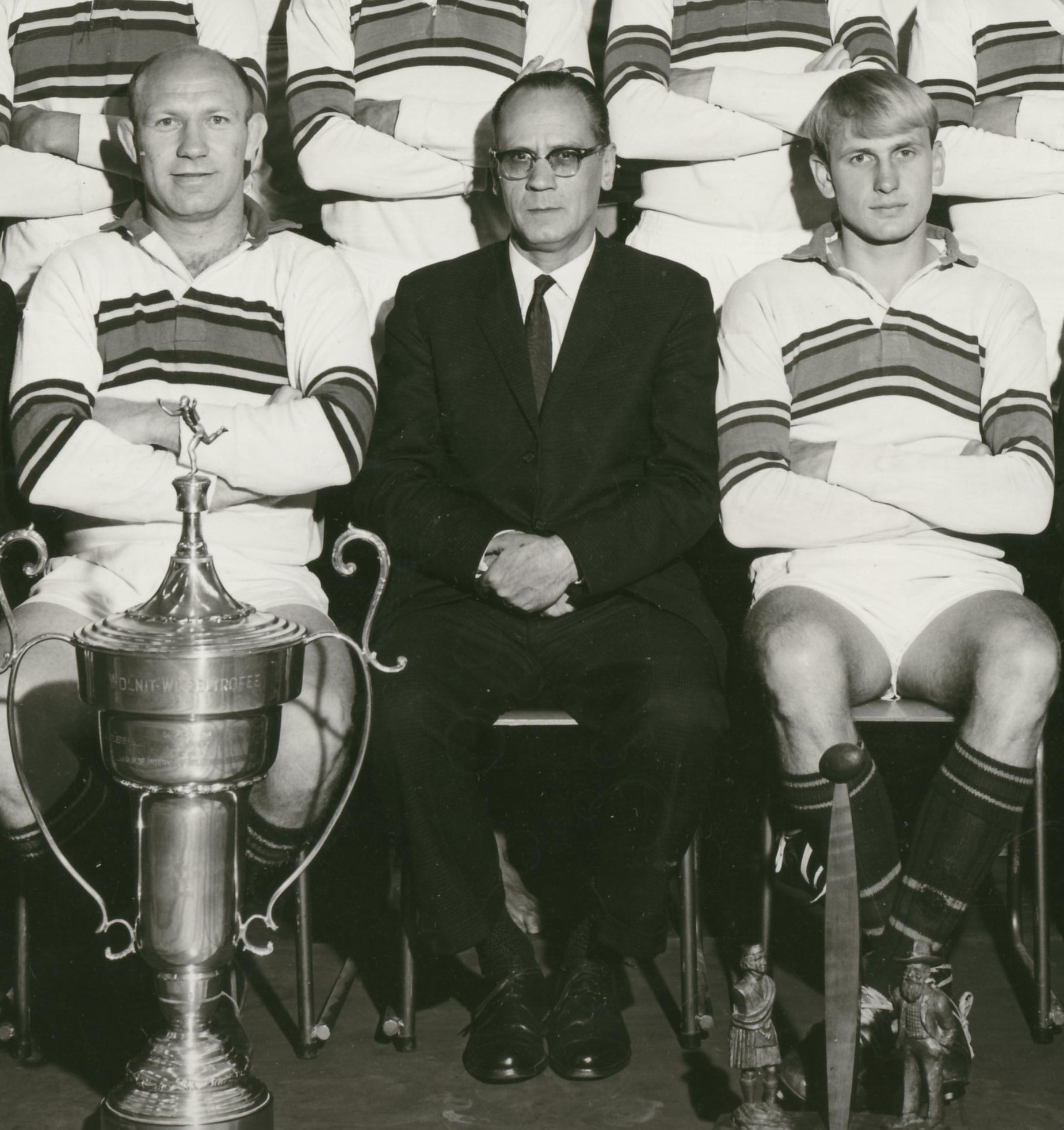
Adriaan Pelzer (center) with University Pretoria rugby team – 1967

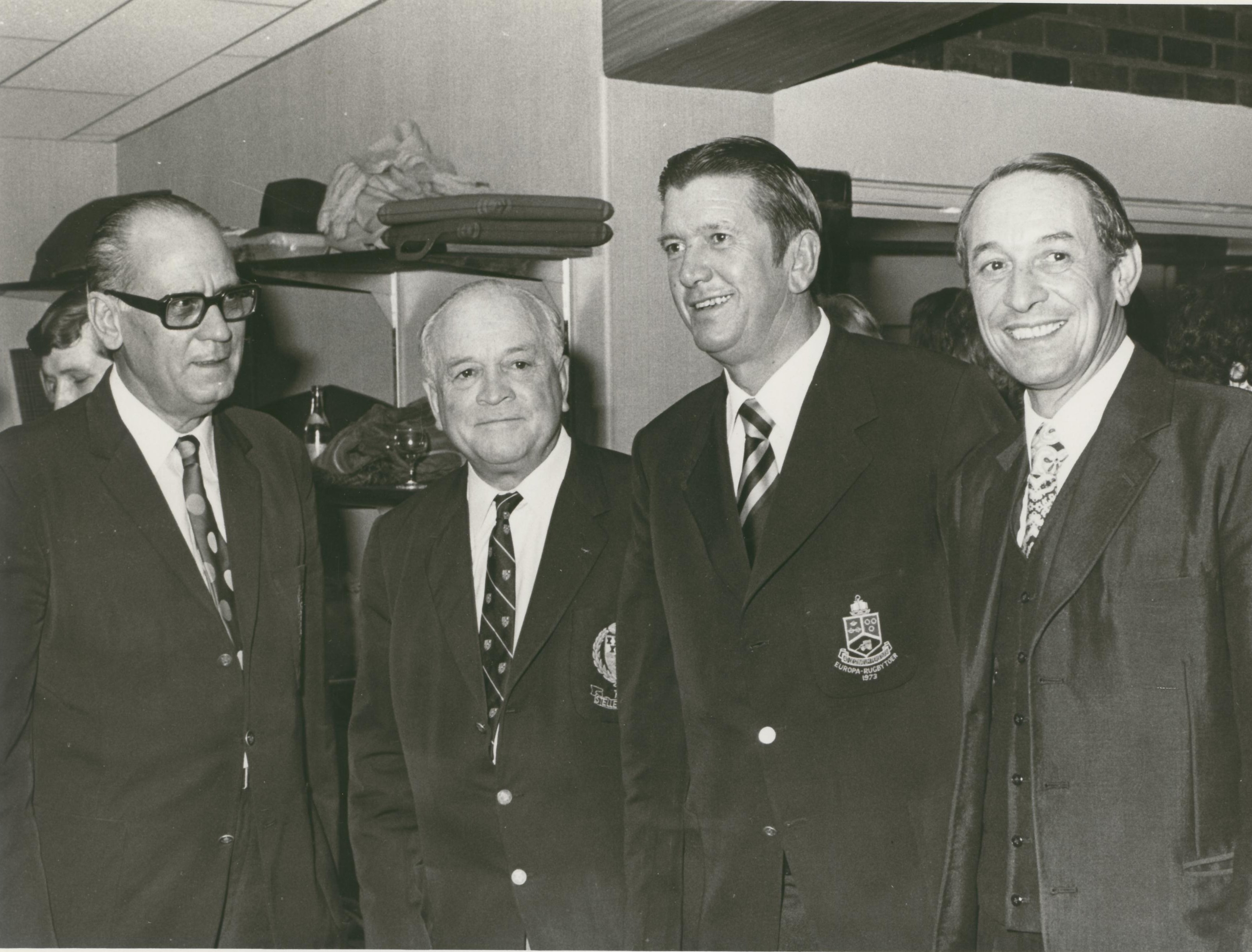
Adriaan Pelzer, Danie Craven, Daan Swiegers and Prof. De Villiers (Photo from family files – taken after a rugby match or during a rugby prize giving ceremony)

Pelzer was awarded an honorary doctorate in Literature (Honoris Causa) on 10 October 1980.

He served on many committees, and was chairperson of the South African Archive Commission, a member of the editorial staff of the South African History Archive yearbook, a member of the Historical Society of South Africa, a member of the academic society for Science and Art, member of the "National Monuments Council", a member of the governing body for the Voortrekker Monument, a member of the Kruger Association, a member of the Simon van der Stel Foundation and a member of the board of the University of the Western Cape.

His most important published works in Afrikaans were "Wordingsjare" (Formative Years), Jan van Riebeeck, "Portuguese Baanbrekers" (Portuguese Pioneers), "Verwoerd aan die Woord" (Verwoerd Speaks), and a documentary on the Afrikaner Broederbond called "The Afrikaner Broederbond: The First 50 Years” (Eerste 50 Jaar). He helped publish books on the history of South Africa called “Geskiedenis van Suid-Afrika”, the history of the Second World War “Geskiedenis van die Tweede Wêreldoorlog”, “Ad Destinatum”, “Lydenburgse Eeufeesgedenkboek 1850–1950” (Lydenburg 100 year commemoration), “Die Rustenburgse Eeufeesgedenkboek 1851–1951” (Rustenburg 100 year commemoration), “Pretoria 1855–1955, Eeufees-album – Pretoria se Eerste Eeu in Beeld” (Pretoria 100 year commemorative album), “Gedenkboek vir Generaal Hertzog” (Commemoration of General Hertzog), “Aspekte van die Suid-Afrikaanse Historiografie” (Aspects of South African Historiography), and “Tukkie-Sport 1930–1980”. In addition he published many scientific and academic articles in academic journals.

He was member of the Afrikaner Broederbond from 1945 (member no. 3381) and was a member of its executive committee from 1965 to 1970.

Sport and specifically rugby (union) was a lifelong passion of his, and he strived to further sport in the university from a coaching and administration point of view. In 1939 he was the captain of the University of Pretoria’s under 19 rugby team, “Tuks U19” which won the “De Vriesbeker” (a club and inter-university trophy) that year. He started out as coach of the university dormitory team (“Sonop”) and progressed to President of Tukkies (University of Pretoria team) from 1960 to 1973.

From 1965 to 1978 he was the vice-president and a member of the executive committee of Northern Transvaal Rugby Union (NTRU), the predecessor to the Blue Bulls and the Bulls Super Rugby franchise). In 1979 he became a lifelong member of the executive committee of the NTRU. In 1977 the UP Sport committee gave him a special award for exceptional service to University Sports and "Tukkie-sport". His interest in university sports is also shown in his published book, "Tukkie-sport 1930–1980" which he completed in 1980 for the 50th commemoration of the founding of the University. The book was published after his death in 1982.

On 18 August 2006 he was awarded and celebrated posthumously by "Tuks-Sport" in the Hall of Fame of the University of Pretoria. (For Tuks-Sport see)

=== Marriage, family and children ===
On 28 June 1941, at the age of 25, he married Reinette Johanna Margaretha Denyssen in the Pretoria-East NG Church. They had three children, Antionette Pelzer born 1 September 1942, Wilna Pelzer born 9 May 1944 and Adriaan Nicolaas Petrus Pelzer born 30 March 1948. The family lived in Pretoria.

On 15 October 1981 he succumbed to a brain aneurism and was buried on 20 October 1981 in the Garsfontein cemetery in Pretoria. The service was conducted in the University NG Church by Prof. C.W.H. Boshoff (the son-in-law of former prime minister Hendrik Verwoerd) and Prof. E.M. Hamman (rector of the University of Pretoria). On 27 October 1995, 14 years later, his wife Reinette died at the age of 79. She was living in a retirement village in Stellenbosch, Western Cape, where she spent her last years. Her body was cremated, and her ashes were placed in the grave of her husband, Prof. Adriaan Nicolaas Pelzer.

Adriaan Pelzer, the founder of PIT Productions with wife Mareli and the front man for industrial metal band NuL, is a grandson of Adriaan Pelzer. (PIT Productions produced two TV series for South African Television and one of the TV Series was called "Kompleks".)

== Related Reading ==
1. Mouton FA, 1997, "AN Pelzer: A Custodian of Afrikanerdom", South African Historical Journal, Vol 37, Issue 1
