= Adriaen Verwer =

Dutch Mennonite merchant, scholar, philosopher and linguist

- Born: Adriaen Pietersz. Verwer c. 1655; Rotterdam
- Died: 31 March 1717 (aged 62); Amsterdam
- Occupations: merchant, writer, scholar
- Writing career
- Language: Dutch, Latin
- Subjects: language, religion, maritime law

Adriaen Verwer (Rotterdam, c. 1655 – Amsterdam, 1717) was a Dutch Mennonite merchant, scholar, philosopher and linguist. He wrote books on language, religion and maritime law. He is best known for his grammar Linguae Belgicae, published anonymously in 1707. He is often regarded as the linguistic mentor of his younger friend Lambert ten Kate.

== Life ==
Adriaen Pietersz. Verwer was born in Rotterdam in about 1655, the son of Pieter Adriaensz. Verwer. In 1680 he moved to Amsterdam, where he soon became involved in the intellectual life of the city. In 1682 he came into contact with the works and the followers of Baruch Spinoza, whose ideas he did not share. He refuted them in his book 't Mom-Aensicht Der Atheistery Afgerukt, "The mask of atheism torn off", published in 1683. His Inleiding tot de Christelyke Gods-geleertheid, "Introduction to Christian theology", published in 1698, examines the relationship between scientific method and theology, and lays out his belief that religious differences could be resolved by a scientific approach.

In 1707 Verwer published his Linguae Belgicae Idea, grammatica, poetica, rhetorica; deprompta ex adversariis Anonymi Batavi: in usum proximi amici ("Grammar, poetry and rhetoric of the Belgian language, from the notes of an anonymous Dutchman, for the use of a close friend"), in which he criticises the Nederduitsche spraekkunst of Arnold Moonen, published in the previous year and based on the work of earlier writers such as Joost van den Vondel. Between 1708 and 1710 Verwer defended the position he had taken in the work in a number of open letters. His work was an important influence on two Dutch linguists, his friend Lambert ten Kate (1674–1731), and Balthazar Huydecoper (1695–1778). Like Verwer, ten Kate was a Mennonite merchant; his Gemeenschap tussen de Gottische Spraeke en de Nederduytsche, "Relationship between the Gothic language and Dutch", published in 1710, was written at Verwer's request, and consists in part of a letter to "A.V.", i.e., Adriaen Verwer. Verwer sent a presentation copy of this work to Adriaan Reland, professor at the University of Utrecht.

Verwer's work on maritime law, Nederlants see-rechten, avaryen, en bodemeryen, "Dutch maritime law, damages, and loans", was published in 1711. It was his most successful book and was reprinted in 1716, in 1730 and in 1764.

Verwer took a keen amateur interest in mathematics, and particularly admired Isaac Newton. His copy of the first edition of the Philosophiae naturalis principia mathematica (1687), extensively annotated in his hand, is preserved in the Universiteitsbibliotheek Utrecht.

Adriaen Verwer died in Amsterdam on 31 March 1717.

== Published works ==
The published works of Adriaen Verwer include:

- 't Mom-Aensicht Der Atheistery Afgerukt door een Verhandeling van den Aengeboren Stand Der Menschen, Vervattende niet alleen een Betoogh van de Rechtsinnige Stellinge, maer ook voornamentlijk een Grondige Wederlegging van de tegenstrijdige Waen-gevoelens en in't bysonder van de geheele Sede-Konst, Van Benedictus de Spinoza. Amsterdam:Wilhelmus Goeree, 1683.
- Inleiding tot de Christelyke Gods-geleertheid. Amsterdam: Jan Rieuwertz, 1698.
- Linguae Belgicae Idea, grammatica, poetica, rhetorica; deprompta ex adversariis Anonymi Batavi: in usum proximi amici. Amstelaedami: excudit Franciscus Halma, MDCCVII (1707). Reprinted 1783.
- Nederlants see-rechten; avaryen; en bodemeryen: begrepen in de gemeene costuimen vander see; de placcaten van Keiser Karel den Vijfden, 1551; en Koning Filips den II. 1563; 't Tractaet van Mr. Quintyn Weitsen van de Nederlandsche avaryen: ende daerenboven in eene verhandlinge nopende het recht der Hollantsche bodemeryen. Verklaert met aenteikeningen, ook met keurige Bijlagen; en 't laetste nieuw-gemaekt; door Adriaen Verwer. Amsterdam: Jan Boom, 1711. Reprinted 1716, 1730 and 1764.
