= Adriaan Schade van Westrum =

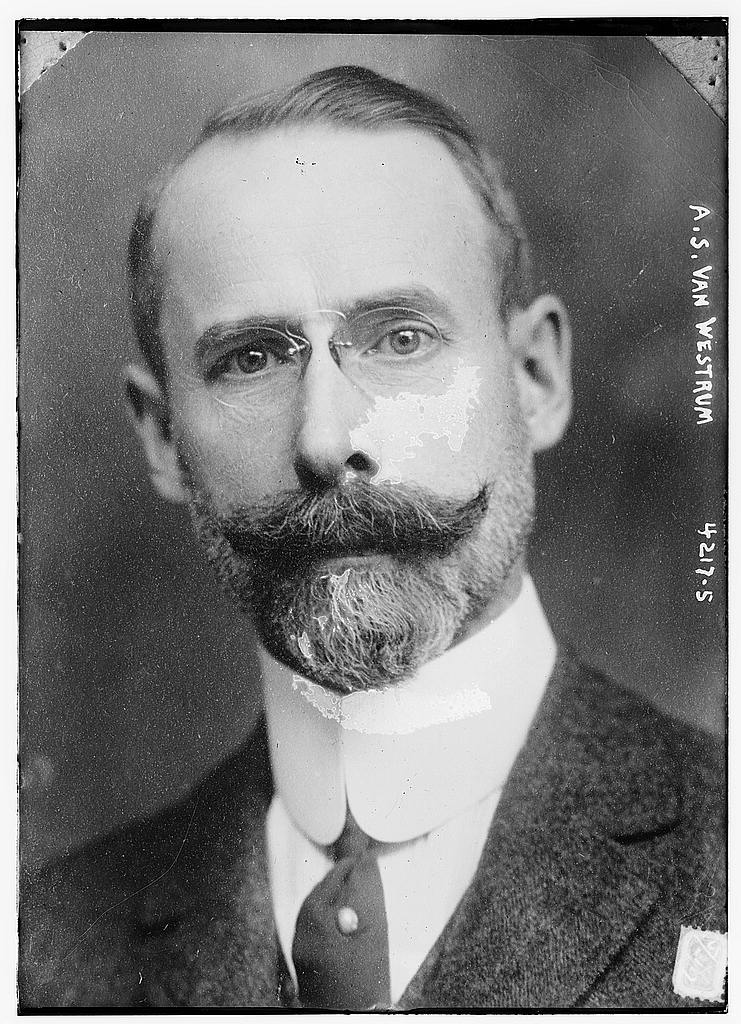

Adriaan Schade van Westrum (14 June 1865 – 19 May 1917) was a member of the editorial staff of the New York Tribune starting in 1910. He was the literary critic since 1913.

== Biography ==
He was born in 1865 in Amsterdam, Netherlands. In 1885 he migrated to the United States. From 1895 to 1908 he was the assistant editor of The Critic. He died on May 19, 1917, at his home at 388 West 136th Street in Manhattan.
