= Adriaan A. van der Willigen =

Dutch philatelist

Adriaan Marie Anne van der Willigen (26 February 1910, The Hague – 29 May 1986, The Hague) was a Dutch philatelist who was added to the Roll of Distinguished Philatelists in 1973. He had a master's degree in economics and was a civil servant at the Ministry of Economic Affairs.
