= Adriaen Hendriksz Verboom =

Dutch painter

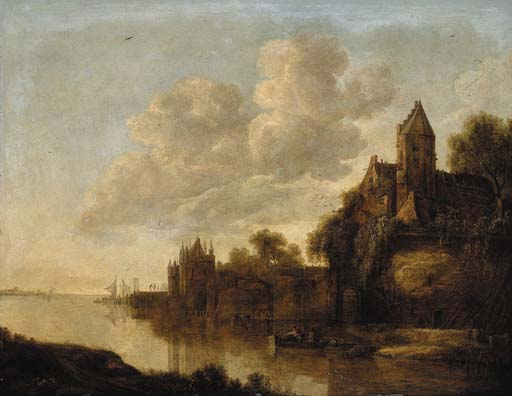
Castle by a river

Adriaen Hendriksz Verboom (1627 – 1673), was a Dutch Golden Age landscape painter.

== Biography ==
He was born in Rotterdam, and was the older brother and teacher of Willem Hendricksz Verboom. He worked in Haarlem from 1650 and in Amsterdam from 1661 and is known for Italianate landscapes in the manner of Jacob van Ruisdael. He seems to have spent a long period in Amsterdam, where his works appeared in inventories and after his wife died in 1667 he returned to Rotterdam, where he later died.

He was documented as a good draughtsman who painted tiles and made etchings, as well as paintings. The Rijksmuseum has several of his drawings and etchings. The Teylers Museum has a book of engravings by Johannes Groensveld after Verboom's drawings.
