= Arjan =

Arjan may refer to:

== Places ==
- Arjan, East Azerbaijan, a village in Iran
- Arjan, Isfahan, a village in Iran
- Arjan District, an administrative subdivision of Iran
- Arrajan, a medieval city and province near modern-day Behbahan
- Arjan Lake, Iran
- Arjan Protected Area, Iran
- Arjan Garh metro station, Delhi Metro, India

== People ==
- Arjan Aguirre, Filipino political scientist and analyst
- Arjan Bajwa (born 1979), Indian actor
- Arjan Bellaj (born 1971), Albanian footballer
- Arjan Beqaj (born 1975), ethnic Albanian footballer from Kosovo
- Arjan Bhullar (born 1986), Olympic freestyle wrestler for Canada
- Arjan Bimo (born 1959), Albanian football player
- Arjan Breukhoven (born 1962), Dutch musician
- Arjan Brussee (born 1972), Dutch computer game developer
- Arjan Singh Chahal (1839–1908), Sikh judge, served as the manager of Darbar Sahib and the Akal Takht
- Arjan Drayton Chana (born 1994), field hockey player
- Arjan Christianen (born 1982), Dutch professional footballer
- Arjan de Zeeuw (born 1970), Dutch footballer
- Guru Arjan Dev, Sikh guru
- Arjan Dhillon (born 1995), Indian musical artist
- Arjan Ebbinge (born 1974), Dutch association footballer
- Arjan Ederveen (born 1956), Dutch actor, comedian, scriptwriter, and director
- Arjan El Fassed (born 1973), Dutch politician
- Arjan Erkel (born 1970), Dutch medical aid worker
- Arjan Goljahanpoor (born 1995), Finnish footballer
- Arjan Hasid (1930–2019), Indian Sindhi language poet
- Arjan Human (born 1978), Dutch association football player
- Arjan Jagt (born 1966), retired Dutch cyclist
- Arjan Knipping (born 1994), Dutch swimmer
- Arjan Konterman (born 1990), Dutch darts player
- Arjan Konomi (born 1969), Albanian Television Opinionist, writer and journalist
- Arjan Malić (born 2005), Bosnian footballer
- Arjan Singh Mastana (died 1986), Punjab politician
- Arjan Moen (born 1977), Dutch darts player
- Arjan Mostafa (born 1994), Iraqi forward
- Arjan Singh Nalwa, Sikh military commander
- Arjan Paans (1969–2023), Dutch journalist
- Arjan Pandey, Nepali singer
- Arjan Peço (born 1975), Albanian football player and coach
- Arjan Pisha (born 1977), Albanian footballer
- Arjan Raikhy (born 2002), English association football player
- Arjan Roskam, King of Cannabis
- Arjan Schreuder (born 1972), Dutch speed skater
- Arjan Sheta (born 1981), Albanian footballer
- Arjan Kumar Sikri (born 1954), judge of the Supreme Court of India
- Arjan Singh (1919–2017), five-star officer of the Indian Air Force
- Arjan Kripal Singh (born 1969), Indian cricketer
- Arjan Smit (born 1978), Dutch speed skater
- Arjan Stafa (born 1964), Albanian football
- Arjan Stroetinga (born 1981), Dutch speed skater
- Arjan Swinkels (born 1984), Dutch footballer
- Arjan Terpstra, musician
- Arjan van der Laan (born 1969), Dutch footballer
- Arjan van Dijk (born 1987), Dutch footballer
- Arjan van Heusden (born 1972), Dutch footballer
- Arjan Vermeulen (born 1969), Dutch footballer
- Arjan Veurink (born 1986), Dutch football manager
- Arjan Xhumba (born 1968), Albanian footballer
- Arjan Zaimi (born 1957), Albanian military leader and politician

== See also ==
- Arjen
- Arjun (disambiguation)
- Arzhan (disambiguation)
