= Kurgan =

Tumulus in Eastern Europe

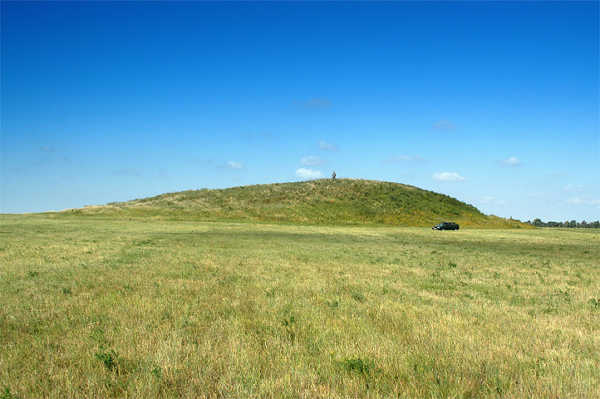
Sarmatian Kurgan, fourth century BC, Fillipovka, South Urals, Russia. A dig led by Russian Academy of Sciences Archeology Institute Prof. L. Yablonsky excavated this kurgan in 2006. It is the first kurgan known to have been completely destroyed and then rebuilt to its original appearance.

A kurgan is a type of tumulus (burial mound) constructed over a grave, often characterized by containing a single human body along with grave vessels, weapons, and horses. Originally in use on the Pontic–Caspian steppe, kurgans spread into much of Central Asia and Eastern, Southeast, Western, and Northern Europe during the third millennium BC.

The earliest kurgans date to the fourth millennium BC in the Caucasus, and some researchers associate these with the Indo-Europeans. Kurgans were built in the Eneolithic, Bronze, and Iron Ages, Antiquity, and the Middle Ages, with ancient traditions still active in southern Siberia and Central Asia.

== Etymology ==
The word kurgan comes from a Turkic word meaning a fortified place, embankment, or high grave. According to the Etymological Dictionary of the Ukrainian Language, the Ukrainian kurhan was borrowed from a Kipchak Turkic language with this meaning. Scholars have proposed two possible origins: the Old Turkic root qori-, meaning "to close", "guard", or "protect", or qur-, meaning "to build", "erect", or "furnish". According to linguist Vasily Radlov, it may be related to qorγan, meaning "fortified place", "fortress", or "castle".

The Russian word kurgan, attested in Old East Slavic, is also thought to have come from an unidentified Turkic language.

In archaeology, a kurgan is a burial mound of earth and stone built over one or more graves. The term is widely used for burial mounds in the archaeology of Eastern Europe and Central Asia.

== History ==
The earliest confirmed kurgans date to the fourth millennium BCE in the Caucasus. Some researchers associate these early burial mounds with the Proto-Indo-Europeans, the prehistoric people thought to have spoken the ancestral Proto-Indo-European language.

Over the following millennia, the tradition of building kurgans spread across the Pontic–Caspian steppe into much of Central Asia and Europe. For thousands of years, people raised burial mounds over the graves of their dead during the Eneolithic, Bronze Age, Iron Age, and into the Middle Ages. By the Iron Age, kurgans had become characteristic burial monuments of many cultures across the Eurasian steppe and southeastern Europe, including the Scythians, Sarmatians, Thracians, Getae, and Dacians. In parts of southern Siberia and Central Asia, the tradition continued even longer.

Some archaeologists have proposed an even earlier origin for kurgans. They suggest that certain flat graves, including those of the Varna culture of the western Black Sea region and the Suvorovo culture of the Pontic–Caspian steppe, were originally covered by burial mounds that later eroded away. If correct, this would place the earliest kurgans in eastern Europe as early as the fifth millennium BCE. However, this interpretation is not widely accepted.

== Kurgan hypothesis ==
The Kurgan hypothesis is that Proto-Indo-Europeans were the bearers of the Kurgan culture of the Black Sea and the Caucasus and west of the Urals. Introduced by Marija Gimbutas in 1956, the theory combines kurgan archaeology with linguistics to locate the origins of the peoples who spoke the Proto-Indo-European language. She tentatively named the culture "Kurgan" after its distinctive burial mounds and traced its diffusion into Europe. The hypothesis has had a significant effect upon Indo-European studies.

Scholars who follow Gimbutas identify a "Kurgan culture" as reflecting an early Proto-Indo-European ethnicity that existed in the steppes and in southeastern Europe from the fifth millennium to the third millennium BC. In Kurgan cultures, most burials were in kurgans, either clan or individual.

== Geographic distribution ==
From their origins on the Pontic–Caspian steppe, kurgans spread across eastern and southeastern Europe, Central Asia, southern Siberia, and parts of Anatolia. Regional traditions developed over several thousand years, reflecting local burial customs, construction methods, and funerary practices.

In present-day Turkey, the Beşiktaş kurgan formation, dating to about 3000 BCE, was discovered during construction of the Istanbul Metro M7. Excavations identified 78 kurgans, providing evidence of prehistoric kurgan construction in northwestern Anatolia.

Across the Eurasian Steppe, kurgans became characteristic burial monuments of Scythian, Saka, and Sarmatian societies. In the Altai Mountains of southern Siberia, the Pazyryk culture constructed kurgans on the Ukok Plateau, near the modern borders of China, Kazakhstan, and Mongolia. The archaeological landscape of the Ukok Plateau forms part of the Golden Mountains of Altai UNESCO World Heritage Site.

Farther east, the Noin-Ula kurgan, located near the Selenga River in the hills of northern Mongolia north of Ulaanbaatar, is the tomb of Uchjulü-Chanuy (8 BC – AD 13), head of the Hun confederation.

Several prehistoric kurgans also survive in present-day Poland, where the words kopiec and kurhan are used for burial mounds. Mounds at Jawczyce were described by Bishop Nankerus in 1322; one uncertainly dated Neolithic or Bronze Age kurgan contained the burial of an elderly person, perhaps male, together with weapons and pottery fragments. Skalbmierz has kurgans dated to 4000 BC.

== Construction and use ==
Kurgans were burial mounds of earth or stone built over one or more graves. Early barrows could include pits, catacombs, stone cists, earthen mounds, cairns, cromlechs, and wooden structures.

Construction methods varied by region and period. In the western regions of Azerbaijan, Late Chalcolithic and Early Bronze Age kurgans included burial chambers built on the surface, graves dug into the natural soil, quadrangular chambers lined with stone, mud brick, wood, or clay plaster, and chambers covered with wooden canopies. Some Early Bronze Age kurgan tombs in that region were intended for long-term collective burial, with earlier bones moved aside when new burials were added.

During the Bronze Age, kurgans across Europe and Asia could contain wooden or stone tombs built on the surface or underground before being covered by a mound. Some Bronze Age tombs had timber roofs, double walls, or passageways, and their construction was similar to house-building methods used by the same cultures.

Kurgans served primarily as funerary monuments. In the Yamnaya culture, kurgan graves and grave gifts indicate a hierarchy in which a small number of richly furnished burials stood apart from more modest graves. In Scythian contexts, the dead were buried and their tombs were marked with burial mounds across the steppe from northern China through southern Siberia to the northern Black Sea.

Elite kurgans could include elaborate burial chambers, grave goods, and sacrificed animals. The Arzhan tumulus in Tuva, dated to the late ninth to early eighth centuries BC, was a complex wooden structure with radially arranged burial chambers, stone-slab walls, and burials of humans and horses.

== Architecture ==
Although kurgans varied considerably across Eurasia from the Eneolithic through the Middle Ages, they typically consisted of a central tomb enclosed within an earthen or stone mound. The chamber could be built above or below ground before the mound was raised over it, while additional features such as stone enclosures, ditches, ritual areas, and entrance passages differed between cultures and periods.

The chambers themselves varied by region and age. Across much of Europe and Asia during the Bronze Age, builders constructed timber or stone tombs before raising the surrounding mound. Some chambers had wooden roofs, double walls, or passageways, and their building methods resembled the houses constructed by the same communities. In present-day Azerbaijan during the Late Chalcolithic and Early Bronze Age, chambers were built from stone, mud brick, timber, or clay plaster. Some were intended for repeated use, with earlier burials moved aside to make room for later ones.

Depending on the culture and period, kurgans could include architectural features beyond the central tomb. These included stone circles, also known as cromlechs, perimeter fences, surrounding ditches or moats, earthen embankments, altars, fire pits, sacrificial areas, standing stones, entrance passages, and wooden roofs. Some monuments also had double walls that created a passage around the tomb, allowing people to move through the structure.

Excavated kurgans demonstrate the variety of these designs. The Ak-su–Aüly kurgan in present-day Kazakhstan, dating to the 12th or 11th century BCE, contained a chamber beneath a pyramidal timber roof enclosed by double walls that formed a passage around the tomb. Similar features have been identified at the Begazy, Sanguyr, Begasar, and Dandybay kurgans. One kurgan in present-day Ukraine was surrounded by 29 upright limestone slabs carved with geometric designs, including rhombuses, triangles, and crosses, as well as human figures. Another kurgan was built beneath a cone-shaped wooden structure made from heavy logs and topped by an ornamented cornice about 2 metres (6.6 ft) high.

Kurgan architecture ranged from simple earthen mounds to elaborate funerary monuments. Some Bronze Age building traditions continued into the Early Middle Ages, with timber chambers and related building methods remaining in use into the eighth to tenth centuries CE. By the Iron Age, some elite kurgans contained large timber burial complexes with multiple chambers and carefully engineered internal structures. The Arzhan tumulus in present-day Tuva, Russia, dating to the late ninth or early eighth centuries BCE, included a large wooden complex with radially arranged chambers enclosed by stone-slab walls, together with human and horse burials beneath a massive mound.

== Burial practices ==
Burial practices associated with kurgans varied across Eurasia over several thousand years. Most kurgans contained a single burial, but others served as family or collective tombs that were reopened repeatedly over many generations. In present-day Azerbaijan, some Late Chalcolithic and Early Bronze Age kurgans were designed for repeated use, with earlier human remains carefully moved aside as new burials were added. Similar evidence of repeated use has been found at the Ipatovo kurgan, where excavations revealed thirteen phases of burial spanning from the fourth millennium BCE into the second millennium CE, including burials associated with the Maykop culture, Catacomb culture, Sarmatians, and Nogai people.

The treatment of the dead also varied between cultures and periods. Individuals were buried in simple graves, stone cists, timber chambers, catacombs, and more elaborate tombs built before the burial mound was raised above them. Some kurgans contained a single burial chamber, while others included multiple chambers or passageways. The Arzhan tumulus in Tuva, dating to the late ninth or early eighth century BCE, contained a large timber complex with radially arranged burial chambers surrounding a central tomb beneath a massive mound.

Many kurgans also included animal burials as part of the funerary ceremony. Horses were especially common in the burials of Iron Age steppe cultures such as the Scythians, Sarmatians, and the Pazyryk culture. Berel Kurgan 11 in present-day Kazakhstan contained thirteen harnessed horses buried beside the funeral chamber, some wearing ceremonial masks fitted with gold-painted wooden ibex horns. Their skin, hair, harnesses, and saddles were preserved by permafrost. The seventh-century BCE Kostromskaya kurgan included twenty-two horses buried in pairs around the principal grave, while the Arzhan tumulus also contained numerous human and horse burials within its timber complex.

Burial customs often reflected differences in social status. While many kurgans marked relatively modest graves, others commemorated elite individuals through elaborate funerary rites, large timber chambers, numerous sacrificed animals, and richly furnished tombs.

== Grave goods ==
Many kurgans contained grave goods, the objects intentionally buried with the dead. These ranged from everyday tools and pottery to elaborate displays of wealth that reflected the status and cultural traditions of the deceased. Their contents provide archaeologists with evidence about the technologies, artistic traditions, and burial customs of the societies that built the kurgans.

Bronze Age burials commonly included ceramic vessels, bronze tools, weapons, ornaments, and jewellery. For example, the Novovelichkovskaya kurgan in southern Russia, dating to about 2000 BCE, contained the remains of eleven people, including an embracing couple, buried with bronze tools, stone carvings, jewellery, and ceramic vessels decorated with red ocher. The tomb is associated with the Novotitorovka culture.

Across the Eurasian Steppe, elite Scythian and Saka kurgans often contained exceptionally rich assemblages of grave goods, including gold ornaments, weapons, drinking vessels, horse equipment, and finely crafted jewellery. The Issyk kurgan in present-day Kazakhstan contained the burial of a young Saka individual together with more than 4,000 gold ornaments, an inscribed silver cup, and a tall pointed headdress that has been compared to traditional Kazakh bridal headwear.

The fourth-century BCE Tovsta Mohyla kurgan in present-day Ukraine yielded the celebrated Golden Pectoral together with an ornate sword scabbard. An intact lateral burial containing a woman and her two-year-old daughter also produced a golden diadem and other fine gold jewellery, illustrating that richly furnished burials were not confined to the principal interment.

The seventh-century BCE Kostromskaya kurgan produced a gold stag ornament that once decorated an iron shield, one of the best-known examples of Scythian animal-style metalwork.

== Scytho-Siberian monuments ==
Monuments of this sort are found at known sites of ancient Scytho-Siberian (including Saka and later Sarmatian) activity. Scytho-Siberian monuments have common features with other kurgans, and the bodies within them sometimes have common genetic roots with those in Eastern European kurgans. Also associated with these burial mounds are the Pazyryk, an ancient people who lived in the Altai Mountains that lay in Siberian Russia on the Ukok Plateau, near the modern borders with China, Kazakhstan, and Mongolia. The archaeological site on the Ukok Plateau associated with the Pazyryk culture is included in the Golden Mountains of Altai UNESCO World Heritage Site.

== Regional and temporal sex ratios ==
In the eastern Manych steppes and Kuban–Azov steppes during the Yamna culture, a near-equal ratio of female-to-male graves was found among kurgans.

In the lower and middle Volga River region during the Yamna and Poltavka cultures, females were buried in only about 20% of graves. Two thousand years later, women dressed as warriors were buried in the same region. David Anthony notes, "About 20% of Scythian–Sarmatian 'warrior graves' on the lower Don and lower Volga contained females dressed for battle ... a phenomenon that probably inspired the Greek tales about the Amazons."

In Ukraine, the ratio was intermediate between the other two regions; approximately 35% were women.

== See also ==
- Animal sacrifice
- Yamnaya culture
- Ashvamedha
- Kleczanów Forest
- Kurgan stelae
- Mamayev Kurgan, used during the Battle of Stalingrad.
- Newgrange
- Tarpan

== Sources ==
- Hugh Honour and John Fleming, A World History of Art, 1st edn. 1982 (many later editions); London: Macmillan, page references are to 1984 Macmillan 1st paperback edn. ISBN 0333371852
- Govedarica, Blagoje (2016). Conflict or Coexistence: Steppe and Agricultural Societies in the Early Copper Age of the Northwest Black Sea Area.
- Kipfer, Barbara Ann (2000). Encyclopedic Dictionary of Archaeology. Springer.
- Mallory, J. P.; Adams, Douglas Q. (1997). Encyclopedia of Indo-European Culture. Taylor & Francis.
- Piotrovsky, Boris, et al. "Excavations and Discoveries in Scythian Lands", in From the Lands of the Scythians: Ancient Treasures from the Museums of the U.S.S.R., 3000 B.C.–100 B.C. The Metropolitan Museum of Art Bulletin, v. 32, no. 5 (1974), available online as a series of PDFs (bottom of the page).
