= MRC 0316−257 =

Radio galaxy in the constellation Fornax

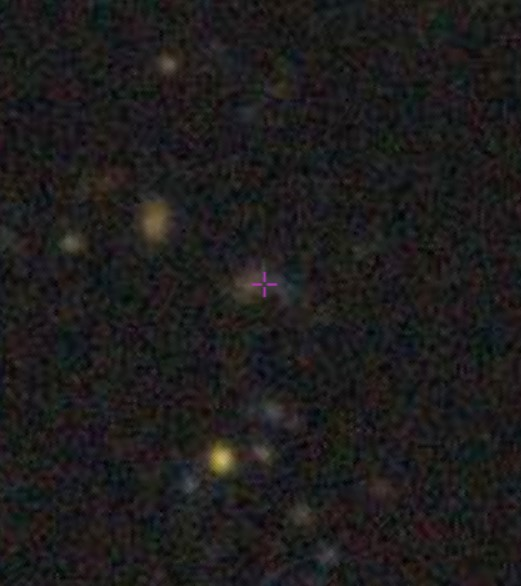
- MRC 0316−257, as seen by DESI Legacy Surveys

Observation data (J2000.0 epoch)
- Constellation: Fornax
- Right ascension: 03^{h} 18^{m} 12.01^{s}
- Declination: −25° 35′ 10.80″
- Redshift: 3.130700
- Heliocentric radial velocity: 938,560 km/s
- Distance: 11.262 Gly (Light travel time distance)
- Apparent magnitude (V): 0.040
- Apparent magnitude (B): 0.053
- Surface brightness: 23.6

Characteristics
- Type: Radio galaxy

Other designations
- PKS 0315−257, PGC 2823475, PMN J0318−2535, OE −227, TXS 0316−257, NVSS J031812−253509

MRC 0316−257 is a radio galaxy located in the constellation Fornax. Its redshift is 3.13, making the object located roughly 11 billion light-years from Earth.

== Characteristics ==
MRC 0316−257 is classified as a high redshift radio galaxy. It is found to be hosted inside a massive star-forming galaxy containing large reservoirs of gas and interstellar dust. Such host galaxies like MRC 0316−257 are believed to be progenitors of massive elliptical galaxies that are present in the local universe, given most powerful radio galaxies are hosted in ellipticals that are considered large. Its 1.5-Jy radio source was listed in the 408-MHz Molonglo Reference Catalogue which was optically identified with a galaxy at z= 3.13 with a typical radio luminosity and radio loudness of L^{5} = 10^{43} - 10^{44} ergs ^{−1} and log R = 3–4.

== MRC 0316−257 protocluster ==
MRC 0316−257 is situated in the center of a massive protoclusters. The cluster has a larger size compared than 3.3x3.3 Mpc^2, which its mass structure is estimated to be > 3-6x10^14 M_sun. This makes it a progenitor of the cluster of galaxies similar to the Virgo cluster.

Two Lyα emitting companions located at z = 3.1378 +/- 0.0028 and z = 3.1351 +/- 0.0028, are found in the MRC 0316−257 protocluster according to research conducted by Le Fevre et al. (1996). The first galaxy is 0.3 h ^{-1}50 Mpc from MRC 0316−257, which is then resolved with an intrinsic size of 11.6 +/- 1.1 h ^{-1}50 kpc, and a Ly alpha in emission with rest WLy alpha = 55 +/- 14 A. The galaxy has an extremely blue V - I color indicating it as a protogalaxy in the midst of forming the first stars in a low-dust medium. The second is at least 1.3 h ^{-1}50 Mpc. The galaxy is marginally resolved, which in addition to Ly alpha in emission, there is C IV in emission with its broad component indicating the contribution from the active galactic nucleus.

The protocluster has a comoving density. These galaxies have V < 23.8 and Ly alpha flux greater than 10-16 ergs cm-2 s-1 within the vicinity of MRC 0316−257. They have ~2.5 x 10-3 h 350 Mpc-3, making them significantly higher than the expected background density of field galaxies, suggesting as a rich cluster.

Through spectroscopy of 40 candidate emitters, 33 emission-line galaxies are discovered. 31 are Ly-alpha emitters with similar redshifts of MRC 0316−257, while the remaining two turned out to be [OII] emitters, with widths between the range of 120–800 km/s, with a median of 260 km/s. They are asymmetric, with apparent absorption troughs blueward of the profile peaks, indicative of absorption along the line of sight of an HI mass of at least 2x10^2 - 5x10^4 M_sun and are found to be faint, blue and small and consistent with young star forming galaxies considered as dust free.

The volume density of Ly-alpha emitting galaxies in the field around MRC 0316−257 have a factor of 3.3+0.5-0.4. This are larger compared with the density of field Ly-alpha emitters at that redshift with a velocity distribution of 1510 km/s, smaller than the width of the narrow-band filter (FWHM ~ 3500 km/s). The velocity distribution is at the peak of 200 km/s, which is within the redshift, thus confirming Ly-alpha emitter galaxies as members of a protocluster at z~3.13.
