= FICE =

FICE may refer to:

- Federal Interagency Committee on Education, a committee of the United States Department of Education
- Fellow of the Institution of Civil Engineers
- Foreign-Invested Commercial Enterprise, a variant of Wholly Foreign Owned Enterprise
- Fuji Intelligent Colour Enhancement, a technique of virtual chromoendoscopy in medicine
- Fice, early spelling of "feist": See Feist (dog)
- Federated Institutes of Cultural Enrichment, a coalition of African American artists active in late-1960s Brooklyn
