= Jie Chen =

Jie Chen or Chen Jie (depending on Chinese name ordering) may refer to the following people:

- Chen Jie (actress) on The Young Warriors (TV series)
- Chen Jie (ambassador) (Chinese: 陳介), Chinese ambassador to Germany before World War II
- Chen Jie (footballer) (Chinese: 陈杰; born 1989)
- Chen Jie (swimmer), on the 2016 Chinese Olympic team
- Jie Chen (pianist) (Chinese: 陈洁, born 1985)
- Jie Chen (news anchor), on KTSF
- Jie Chen (statistician)
- Chen Jie, a fictional prison guard in Seventeen Years (film)
