= 4C 32.26 =

Radio galaxy in the constellation Cancer

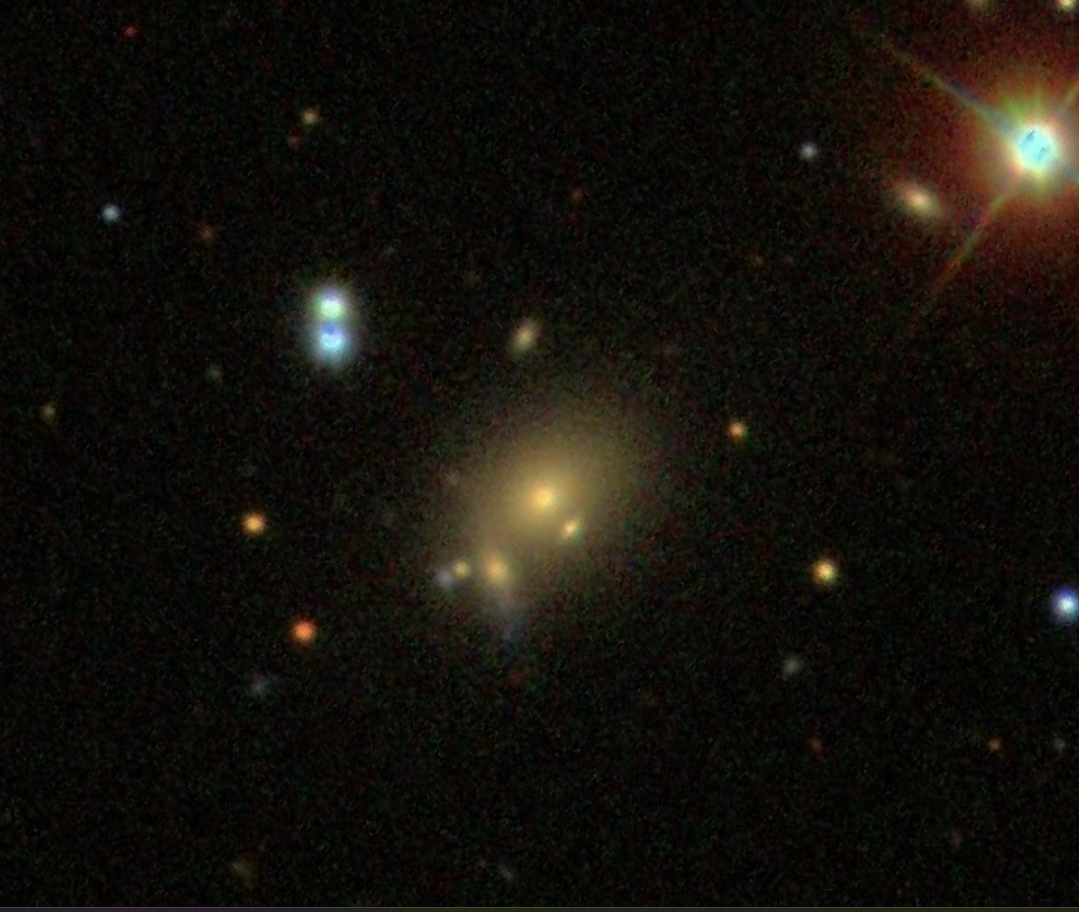
- The radio galaxy 4C 32.26.

Observation data (J2000 epoch)
- Constellation: Cancer
- Right ascension: 08^{h} 41^{m} 13.08^{s}
- Declination: +32° 24′ 59.45″
- Redshift: 0.068488
- Heliocentric radial velocity: 20,532 km/s
- Distance: 950 Mly
- Group or cluster: Abell 695
- Apparent magnitude (B): 14.08

Characteristics
- Type: E; BrCLG
- Size: ~287,000 ly (88.1 kpc) (estimated)

Other designations
- 2MASX J08411308+3224596, B2 0838+32A, PGC 24412, NVSS J084112+322459, TXS 0838+325, VERA J0841+325, 2CXO J084113.0+322459

4C 32.26 is a radio galaxy located in the constellation of Cancer. The redshift of the galaxy is (z) 0.068, estimating a light travel time of 950 million light-years away, and it was first discovered as an astronomical radio source by astronomers in 1969 who were conducting the Fourth Cambridge Survey. The galaxy is considered to be part of the dumbbell system and is the brightest cluster galaxy (BCG) in the center of the galaxy cluster, Abell 695.

== Description ==
4C 32.26 is classified as both a wide-angle tail (WAT) and weak radio galaxy. Its host is a large elliptical galaxy found described to have the presence of a central component that is associated with it and a western component that is found to be displaced by 70 kiloparsecs. Studies of this host galaxy shows it has an undisturbed appearance without any signs of a major galaxy merger, although it is found interacting with the other cluster members. A faint companion is located away from it by 11 arcseconds.

The radio structure of 4C 32.26 is found as compact. When observed, the structure is to be reminiscent of Fanaroff-Riley Class Type II sources with its radio core having a total flux density of 7.5 MJy. Radio observations made by Very Large Array (VLA) at 1.4 GHz frequencies, showed a compact source instead surrounded by radio emission. At 4.9 GHz, there is an inner source present with two radio lobes. These lobes are found to span around 16 kiloparsecs with much fainter asymmetric lobes that have a projected size of 150 kiloparsecs from the position of the nucleus. A jet appears to lead towards a faint lobe but it is instead at 90° in terms of projection. Further evidence also pointed out the galaxy is also a restarted source whose first pair of lobes are old and no longer fueled while the second pair of lobes are consider as young with approximate ages of between 3 and 7 million years old. Earlier observations found the presence of two jet-like structures that ends in hotspot positions.

A study has found 4C 32.26 has an extended emission line region (EELR) based on narrow-band optical imaging. Based on results, the EELR emission is mainly concentrated mainly on the host galaxy.
