= Nagarjuna (disambiguation) =

Nagarjuna was an Indian Buddhist teacher of the 3rd century CE.

Nagarjuna or Nagarjun may also refer to:

- Nagarjuna (actor) (born 1959), Indian film actor
- Nagarjuna Power Plant, north of Mangalore, India
- Nagarjuna Hospital, Vijayawada, Andhra Pradesh, India
- Nagarjun (1911–1998), Indian author
- Nagarjuna (metallurgist), of 10th century India
- Nagarjun Municipality (Kathmandu Valley)
  - Nagarjun, Nepal, a town in far western Nepal
- Naagarjuna – Ek Yoddha, Indian television series
- Nagarjuna (film), a 1961 Indian Kannada film

== See also ==
- Naga (disambiguation)
- Arjuna (disambiguation)
