= Breukhoven =

Breukhoven is a surname. Notable people with the surname include:

- Arjan Breukhoven (born 1962), Dutch musician
- Hans Breukhoven (1946–2017), Dutch businessman
