= NGC 6338 =

Lenticular galaxy in the constellation Draco

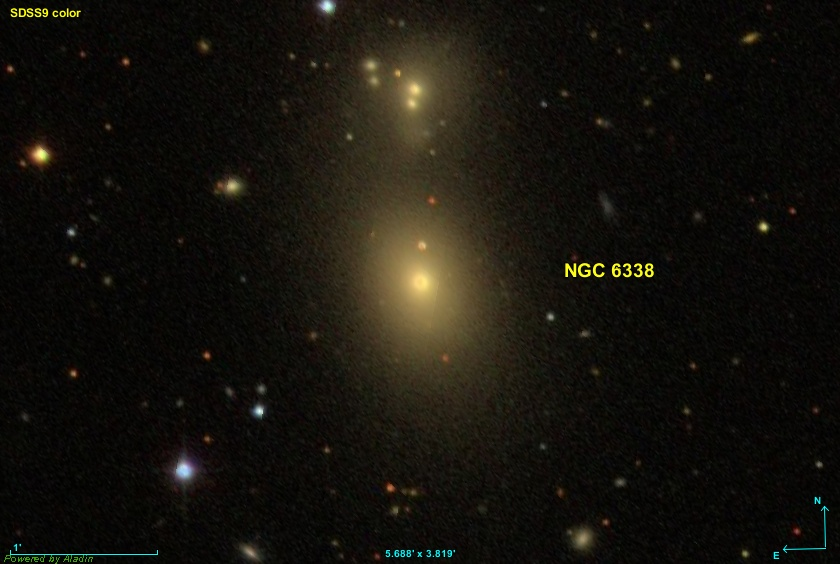
- The lenticular galaxy, NGC 6338.

Observation data (J2000 epoch)
- Constellation: Draco
- Right ascension: 17^{h} 15^{m} 22.99^{s}
- Declination: +57° 24′ 40.26″
- Redshift: 0.027303
- Heliocentric radial velocity: 8,185 km/s
- Distance: 392 Mly (120.18 Mpc)
- Apparent magnitude (B): 14.2

Characteristics
- Type: cD;S0; PEG blazar
- Size: 78.16 kiloparsecs (254,900 light-years) (diameter; 2MASS K-band total isophote)

Other designations
- PGC 59947, UGC 10784, CGCG 299-066, MCG +10-24-116, WBL 6356-002

NGC 6338 is a large lenticular galaxy located in the constellation Draco. It is located at an estimated distance of 392 million light years from Earth and was discovered by William Herschel in 1789. According to Herschel, he mentioned, "the object is faint, small and round with a little brighter middle."

== Characteristics ==
NGC 6338 is the brightest cluster galaxy in the NGC 6338 group, shown merging with another galaxy group. It forms a pair with MCG +10-24-117. It has an ellipsoidal appearance based on findings of a stellar component revolving around a major axis. NGC 6338 is also more luminous compared to other members with estimated absolute magnitudes of M_{B} = -22.2 and M_{V} = -21.92. NGC 6338 also contains a central bright source when seen in X-rays. A double nucleus is present in NGC 6338.

The nucleus of NGC 6338 is active and it is classified both a LINER as well as a Fanaroff-Riley class type 0 radio galaxy. The most accepted theory for this energy source for active galactic nuclei is the presence of an accretion disk around a giant black hole. Furthermore, NGC 6338 has both young and old radio lobes, with radiative ages of 200 and 50 million years old. It also has a small parsec-scale radio jet with radio emission in its core. There are also X-ray cavities located both northeast and southwest of the galaxy's nucleus.

Based on narrow band imaging taken with Hubble Space Telescope, NGC 6338 contains Hα emission originating from two compact clouds in its galactic center and three filaments along its minor axis. The filaments have a projected outward extension of ~ 13.5" and a total Hα flux of 1.78 × 10^{−14} erg s^{−1} cm^{−2}.
