= Flagship species =

Concept in conservation biology

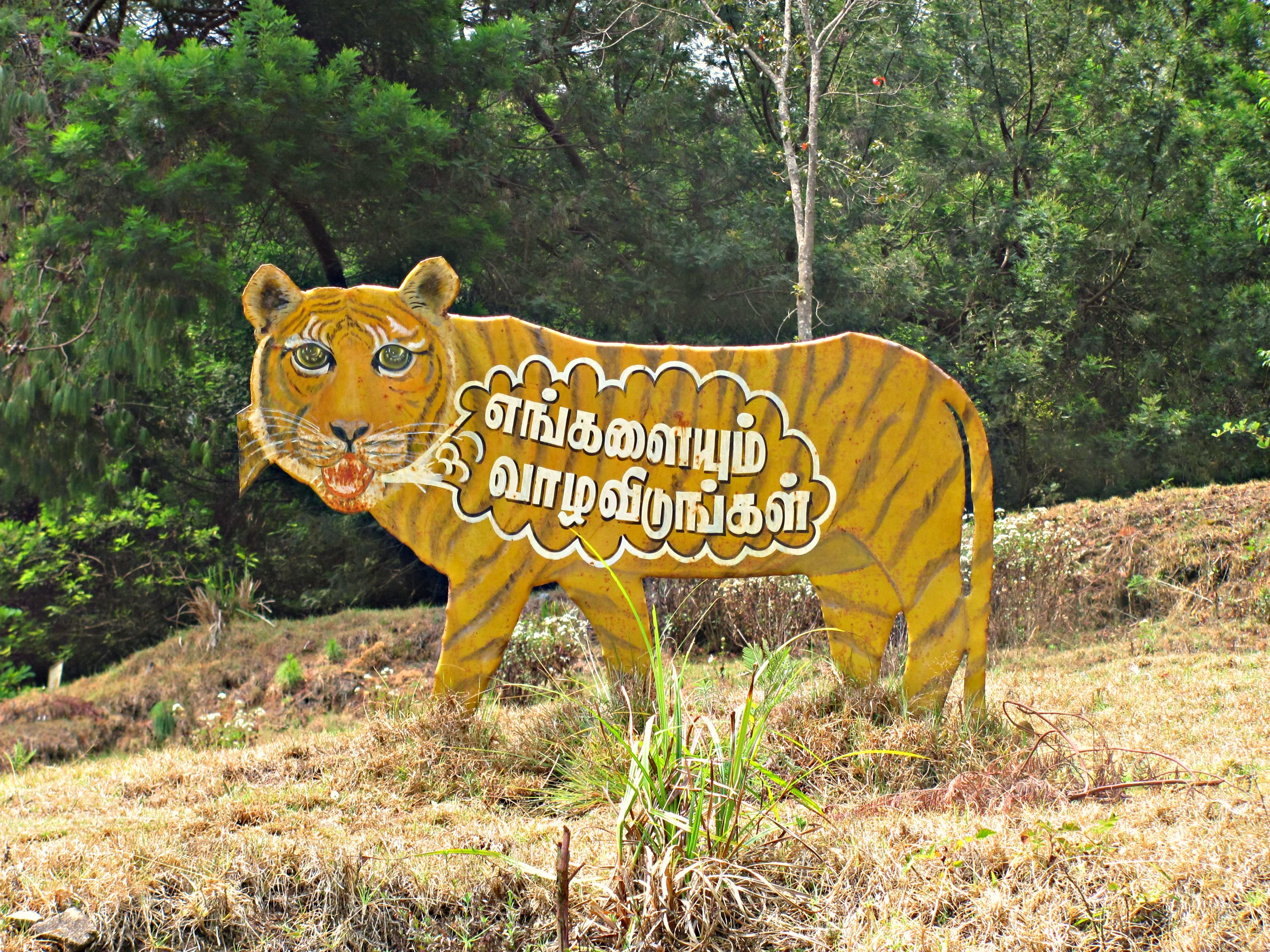
Tiger as flagship species for a campaign in Tamil Nadu, India

In conservation biology, a flagship species is a species chosen to raise support for biodiversity conservation in a given place or social context. Definitions have varied, but they have tended to focus on the strategic goals and the socio-economic nature of the concept, to support the marketing of a conservation effort. The species need to be popular, to work as symbols or icons, and to stimulate people to provide money or support.

Species selected since the idea was developed in 1980s include widely recognised and charismatic species like the black rhinoceros, the Bengal tiger, and the Asian elephant. Some species such as the Chesapeake blue crab and the Pemba flying fox, the former of which is locally significant to Northern America, have suited a cultural and social context. Although animal species that can be described as "charismatic megafauna" are frequently the flagship species for a protected ecosystem, large, dominant plant species sometimes serve this role as well, for example, several United States national parks, including Redwood National and State Parks, Joshua Tree National Park, and Saguaro National Park, are named for the flagship plant species for those protected areas. Butterfly species, such as the monarch butterfly, have also served as flagship species in some contexts.

Utilizing a flagship species has limitations. It can skew management and conservation priorities, which may conflict. Stakeholders may be negatively affected if the flagship species is lost. The use of a flagship may have limited effect, and the approach may not protect the species from extinction: all of the top ten charismatic groups of animal, including tigers, lions, elephants and giraffes, are endangered.

== Definitions ==
Zanzibar red colobus as flagship species for a conservation organization in Zanzibar

The term flagship is linked to the metaphor of representation. In its popular usage, flagships are viewed as ambassadors or icons for a conservation project or movement. The geographer Maan Barua noted that metaphors influence what people understand and how they act; that mammals are disproportionately chosen; and that biologists need to come to grips with language to improve the public's knowledge of conservation. Several definitions have been advanced for the flagship species concept and for some time there has been confusion even in the academic literature. Most of the latest definitions focus on the strategic, socio-economic, and marketing character of the concept. Some definitions are:

- "a species used as the focus of a broader conservation marketing campaign based on its possession of one or more traits that appeal to the target audience"
- "species that have the ability to capture the imagination of the public and induce people to support conservation action and/or to donate funds"
- "popular, charismatic species that serve as symbols and rallying points to stimulate conservation awareness and action"

== History ==
The flagship species concept appears to have become popular around the mid 1980s within the debate on how to prioritise species for conservation. The first widely available references to use the flagship concept applied it to both neotropical primates and African elephants and rhinos, in the mammal-centric approach that still dominates how the concept is used. The use of flagship species has been dominated by large bodied animals, especially mammals, although members of other taxonomic groups have occasionally been used.

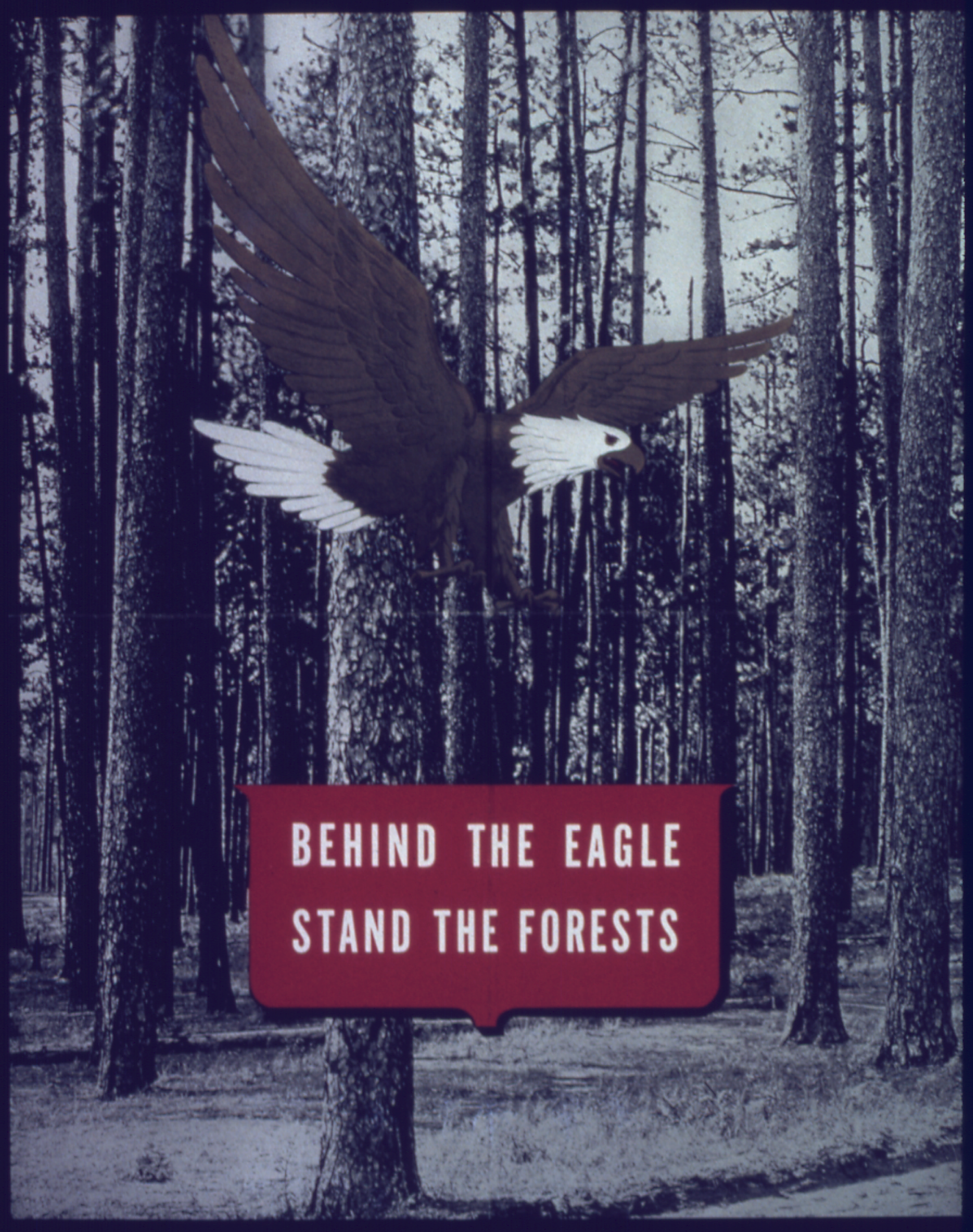
Bald eagle as flagship for forests in the United States

Flagship species projects have sometimes been successful in saving the species and its habitat, as with the American bald eagle and the manatee.

== Choosing species ==
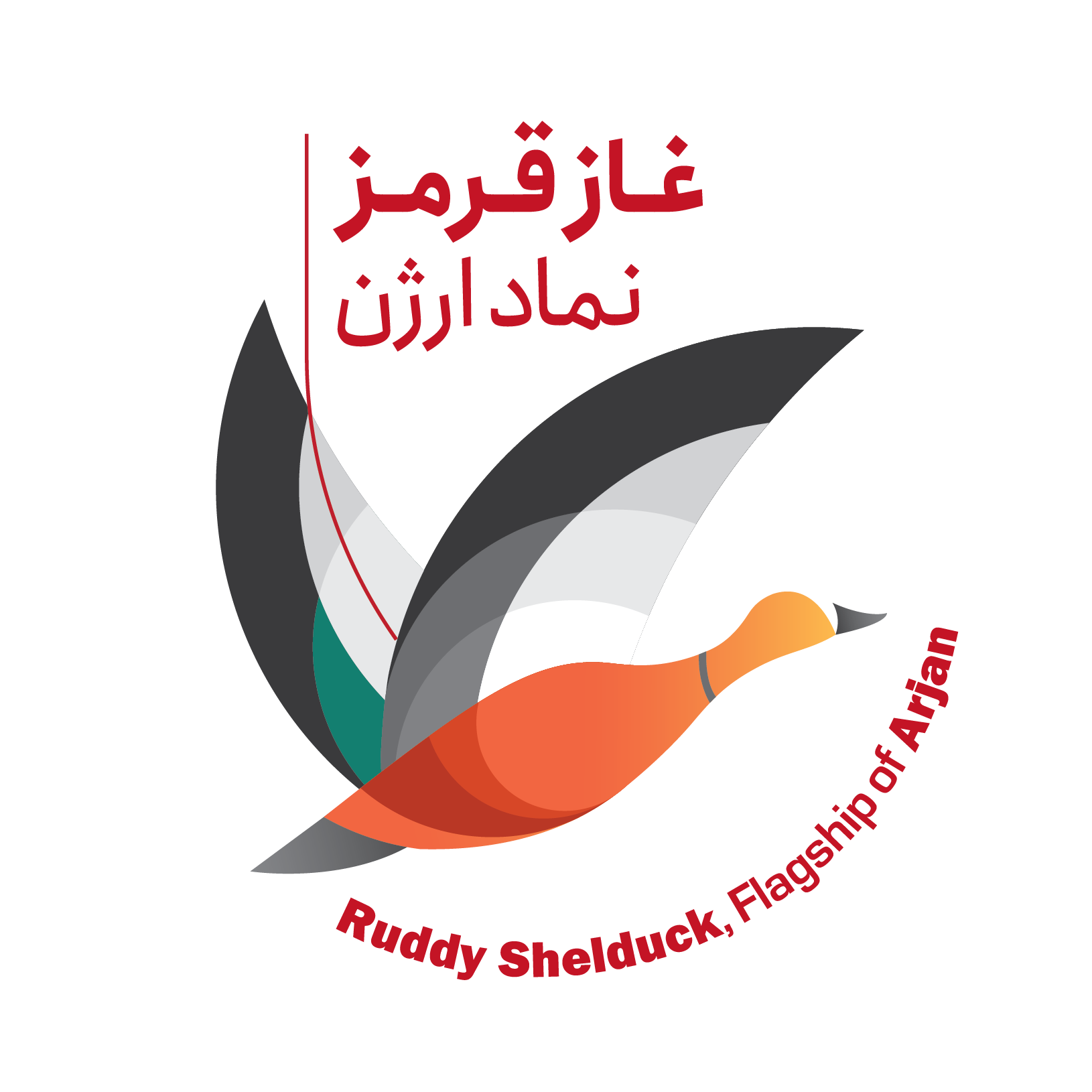
Ruddy Shelduck, Flagship species of Arjan International Wetland

Chosen flagship species are often charismatic, well-known species: see the Bengal tiger (Panthera tigris), the giant panda (Ailuropoda melanoleuca), the Golden lion tamarin (Leontopithecus rosalia), the African elephant (Loxodonta sp.) and Asian elephant (Elephas maximus). However, because flagship species are selected according to the audience they are hoping to influence, these species can also belong to traditionally uncharismatic groups if the cultural and social content is right. Less charismatic but locally significant species include the use of the Pemba flying fox as a flagship in Tanzania, and of the Chesapeake blue crab as a flagship in the US. The Ruddy Shelduck (Tadorna ferruginea) is used a flagship species for the Arjan International Wetland in Iran, selected through a participatory process to reconnect local people with the wetland's biodiversity.

Some flagship species are keystone species, like the African lion, a top predator: it used to control the populations of large herbivores, protecting ecosystems across the entire landscape. However, the lion's ability to serve as a keystone species is decreasing as its population and range decline. The WWF uses flagship species as one of its species classification categories, along with keystone and indicator species. It chooses between these when selecting a priority species to represent the conservation threats facing a certain region.

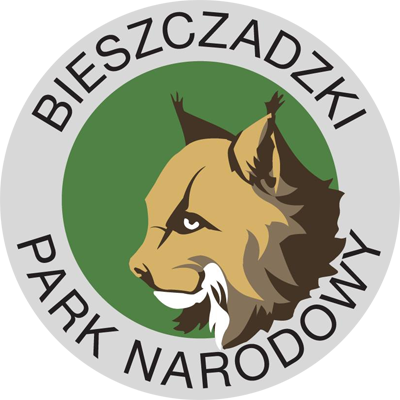
Eurasian lynx as flagship for a protected area in Poland

Flagship species can represent an environmental feature (e.g. a species or ecosystem), cause (e.g. climate change or ocean acidification), organization (e.g. NGO or government department) or geographic region (e.g. state or protected area).

Flagship species can be selected according to many different methodologies, such as social marketing, environmental economics, and conservation biology, depending on what is valued by the audience they try to target, and the goals of the project, such as conservation awareness, fundraising, ecotourism promotion, community-based conservation, and promotion of funded research. This is illustrated by the differences in recommendations made for flagship species selection targeting different target audiences such as local communities and tourists.

== Limitations ==
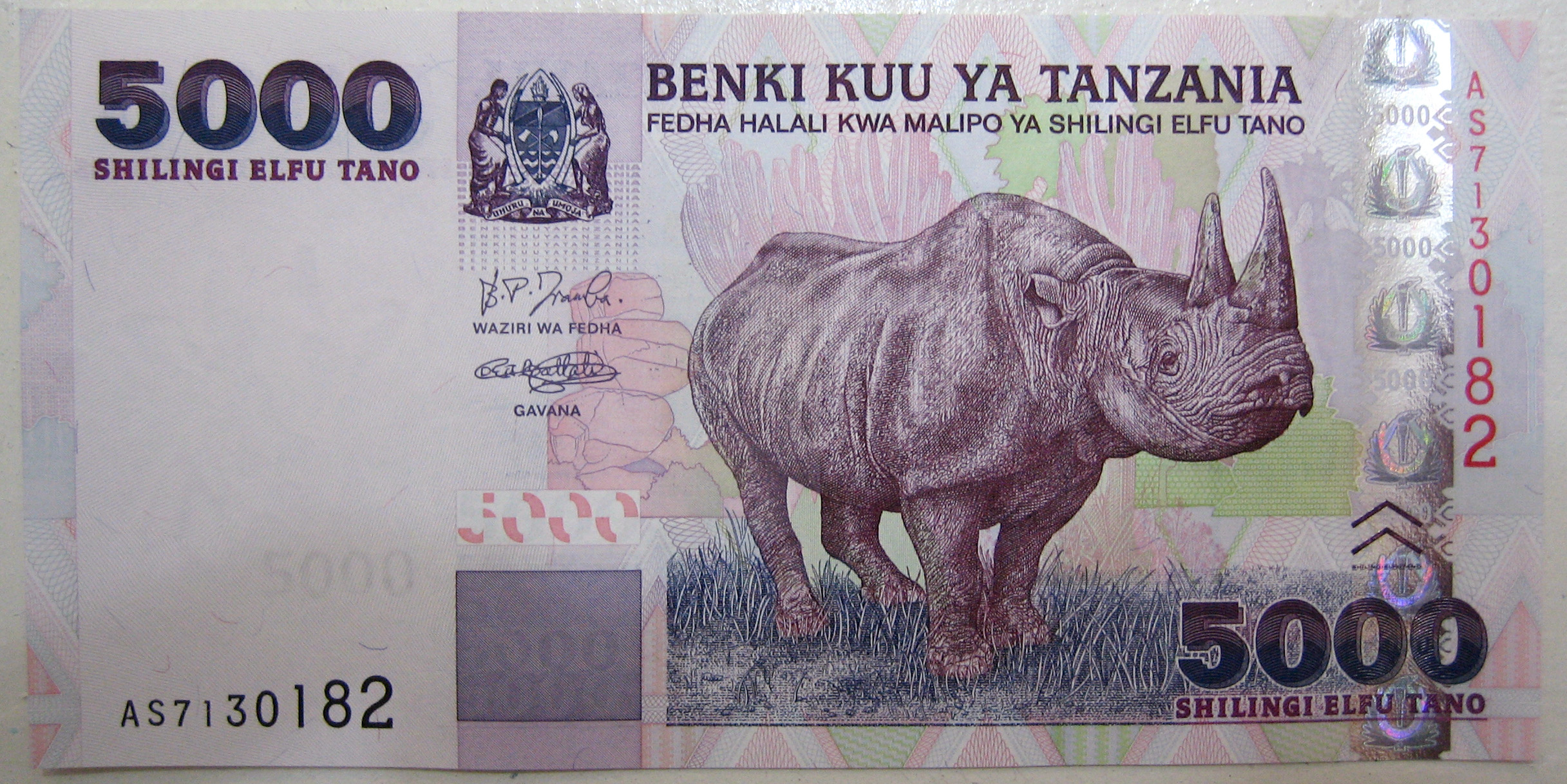
5000 Tanzanian shillings bank note with Black rhinoceros as flagship for the country's wildlife

The use of flagship species has some limitations:

- They can skew the management and conservation priorities in their favour, to the detriment of more threatened but less charismatic species.
- The management of different flagships can conflict.
- The disappearance of the flagship can have negative impacts on the attitudes of the conservation stakeholders.
- They may have limited impact on the behaviour of donors, if the donors cannot dedicate much time to processing the campaign message.
- Most conservation practices for flagship species tend to be costly and difficult to maintain

Leaving aside the impact on other species, charisma does not seem to protect even charismatic species against extinction. All ten of the most charismatic groups (Note: Elephant includes African savannah, African forest, and Asian species; giraffe has been split into four species.) of animal identified in a 2018 study, namely tiger, lion, elephant, giraffe, leopard, panda, cheetah, polar bear, wolf, and gorilla, are currently endangered; only the giant panda shows a demographic growth from an extremely small population. The researchers suggest that the widespread use of images of these animals has given the public the impression that the animals are abundant, obscuring their high risk of imminent extinction. They note that this remains true despite the intense focus of conservation efforts on these particular species. A major challenge for the utilization of several flagship species in non-Western contexts is that they may come into conflict with local communities, thereby jeopardizing well-intended conservation actions. This has been termed "flagship mutiny", and is exemplified by the Asian elephant in countries where there is human-elephant conflict.

== Other types ==
Conservation flagships can be used at broader levels, for example as ecosystems like coral reefs, rainforests or protected areas like the Serengeti or Yellowstone. Some recent initiatives have developed flagships based on the conservation value of particular areas or species. Examples of these are the EDGE project run by the Zoological Society of London and the Hotspots run by Conservation International. More recently, work in microbiology has started to use flagship species in a distinct way. This work relates to the biogeography of micro-organisms and uses particular species because "eyecatching 'flagships' with conspicuous size and/or morphology are the best distribution indicators".

== See also ==
- Keystone species
- Indicator species
- Charismatic megafauna
- Umbrella species
