= Arjun (name) =

- Gender: Male

Origin
- Meaning: "white", "clear" "silver"
- Region of origin: India

Arjun (Sanskrit: [ɐrˈdʑʊnɐ]) is an Indian male given name, which means lustrous, shiny white (as that of silver), color of the lightning; of the milk; of silver; made of silver. It is also the name of the Arjun tree due to its silvery bark; Name of lndra, and of the third of the Pandava prince (Arjuna, the son of Indra and Kunti).

== Notable persons with the name ==
=== Legendary ===
- Arjuna, a character of the Mahabharata
- Kartavirya Arjuna, a character of the Mahabharata and Ramayana

=== Rulers ===
- Arjuna Varman I, Paramara king of central India
- Arjuna Varman II, Paramara king of central India
- Arjuna, a Paratarajas ruler of Baluchistan area (c. 150–160 CE)

=== Actors ===
- Arjun (Firoz Khan), Indian actor, born as Firoz Khan, who played the role of Arjuna in B. R. Chopra's TV series Mahabharat
- Arjun Bijlani, Indian television actor and model
- Arjun Kapoor, Indian movie actor
- Arjun Punj, Indian television actor
- Arjun Rampal, Indian fashion model and movie actor
- Arjun Sarja, Indian movie actor
- Allu Arjun, Indian actor of Telugu films
- Raj Arjun, Indian movie/television actor
- Sara Arjun, Indian child actress

=== Sports ===
- Arjun Atwal, Indian professional golfer
- Arjun Erigaisi, Indian chess grandmaster
- Arjun Menon, Singaporean cricket player and coach
- Arjun Naidu, former Indian First Class cricketer
- Arjun Nair, Australian cricketer
- Arjuna Ranatunga, former Sri Lankan cricketer, now a politician
- Arjun Yadav, former Indian First Class cricketer
- Arjun Maini, Indian professional racing driver

=== Others ===
- Guru Arjan, the 5th Sikh Guru.
- Arjun Appadurai, Indian-American social theorist
- Arjun Janya, Indian film score and soundtrack composer and singer
- Arjun Munda, chief minister of the Indian state of Jharkhand
- Arjun Kanungo, Indian singer

== See also ==
- Arjun (disambiguation)
- Arjun Gupta (disambiguation)
