= Arzhan =

Arzhan may refer to:

- Arzhan culture, archaeologic site in the Tuva Republic, Russia
- Arzhan District, District in Fars province, Iran
- Arjan Lake (Arzhan Lake), is a lake in Fars province, Iran
- Dasht-e Arzhan, village in Fars province, Iran

== See also ==
- Arjan (disambiguation)
- Arzan (disambiguation)
