= Jie Chen (statistician) =

American statistician

Jie Chen is a statistician who works as a professor of biostatistics and epidemiology at the Medical College of Georgia. As well as biostatistics, her research interests include change detection.

Chen earned a bachelor's degree in statistics from Chongqing University in China in 1985, and became a lecturer at Southwestern University of Finance and Economics from 1985 to 1988. She returned to graduate school for a master's degree from the University of Akron in 1990, and a Ph.D. from Bowling Green State University in 1995, under the supervision of Arjun Kumar Gupta. She joined the Department of Mathematics and Statistics at the University of Missouri–Kansas City in 1995, and was department chair from 2008 until 2014, when she moved to Georgia.

In 2014 she was elected as a Fellow of the American Statistical Association "for significant contributions to change point problems and their applications to genomics data; for high-impact collaborative research in biological research; for excellence in teaching and mentoring students; and for dedicated service to the profession."
