= Lake Düden =

Lake in Kulu, Konya, Turkey

- Düden Gölü (Turkish)
- Location of the lake in Turkey.
- Location: Kulu, Konya Province, Turkey
- Coordinates: 39°05′N 33°08′E
- Basin countries: Turkey
- Surface area: 860 ha (2,100 acres)
- Surface elevation: 950 m (3,120 ft)
- Islands: 9

Lake Düden, also known as Lake Kulu, (Turkish: Düden Gölü or Kulu Gölü), is a brackish water lake in Konya Province, Turkey.

Lake Düden is located northwest of Lake Tuz and 5 km (3.1 mi) east of Kulu town in Konya Province at an elevation of 950 m (3,120 ft). It is a shallow brackish water lake covering 860 ha (2,100 acres) area. The lake is fed mainly by Kulu Creek, a.k.a. Değirmenözü Creek, in the west. It has no outlet. Spring waters around lake contribute also to the lake's feeding. There are nine islets inside the lake. In the south of the lake, there is a fresh water lake named "Little Lake" (Turkish: Küçük Göl) surrounded by dense reeds. While the ducks generally brooding at the Little Lake in the south, the gulls and common terns prefer the islets in colonies. Lake Düden, Lake Little and their surrounding area of wetlands and steppes are declared protected area in 1992.

== Ecosystem ==
Flora

Most of the nine islets are covered by grass in the spring season. The lake is surrounded by wheat fields of dryland farming and naked steppe. In the north, there are water-meadows at some places used for cattle grazing.

Fauna

Lake Düden is a habitat for around 40,000 waders of more than 170 species during both breeding and migration periods. The area houses summer breeds like marbled duck, ferruginous duck, white-headed duck, avocet, greater sand plover, Mediterranean gull and gull-billed tern. Before and after breeding periods, a great number of waders are observed, including black-necked grebe, ruddy shelduck, white-headed duck, black-winged stilt, avocet and snowy plover. In the winter time, the lake freezes. However, greater white-fronted goose can be observed in great numbers. Other breeding species are Eurasian spoonbill, pratincole, slender-billed gull and black-headed gull. Lake Düden is an important breeding habitat in Turkey for the world-wide endangered species white-headed duck. Lately, flamingo colonies came to the lake.

It is a popular site for birdwatchers from Ankara.

== Environmental threat ==
The sinking of water level in the lake is the most important threat. The excessive consumption of groundwater and surface water in the Konya Closed Basin started to affect the lake. Despite the intensive snowfall in 2006, the lake has almost completely dried out. As a result of the sinking of water level, the islets were connected with each other, and the breeding of birds stopped. The untreated waste water of the Kulu district was dumped in the past into Kulu Creek, which feeds the lake. The plan of Kulu municipality to build roads to and around the lake, and to afforest the lake's surrounding would be a threat for the breeding birds. Another important issue is the poaching.

In 2010, the district administration undertook measures to save the lake by building a waste water treatment facility and preventing unlawful water usage from the creek.
