= Arjun Gupta =

Arjun Gupta may refer to:

- Arjun Gupta (actor) (born 1986), American actor and producer
- Arjun Kumar Gupta, professor of statistics
