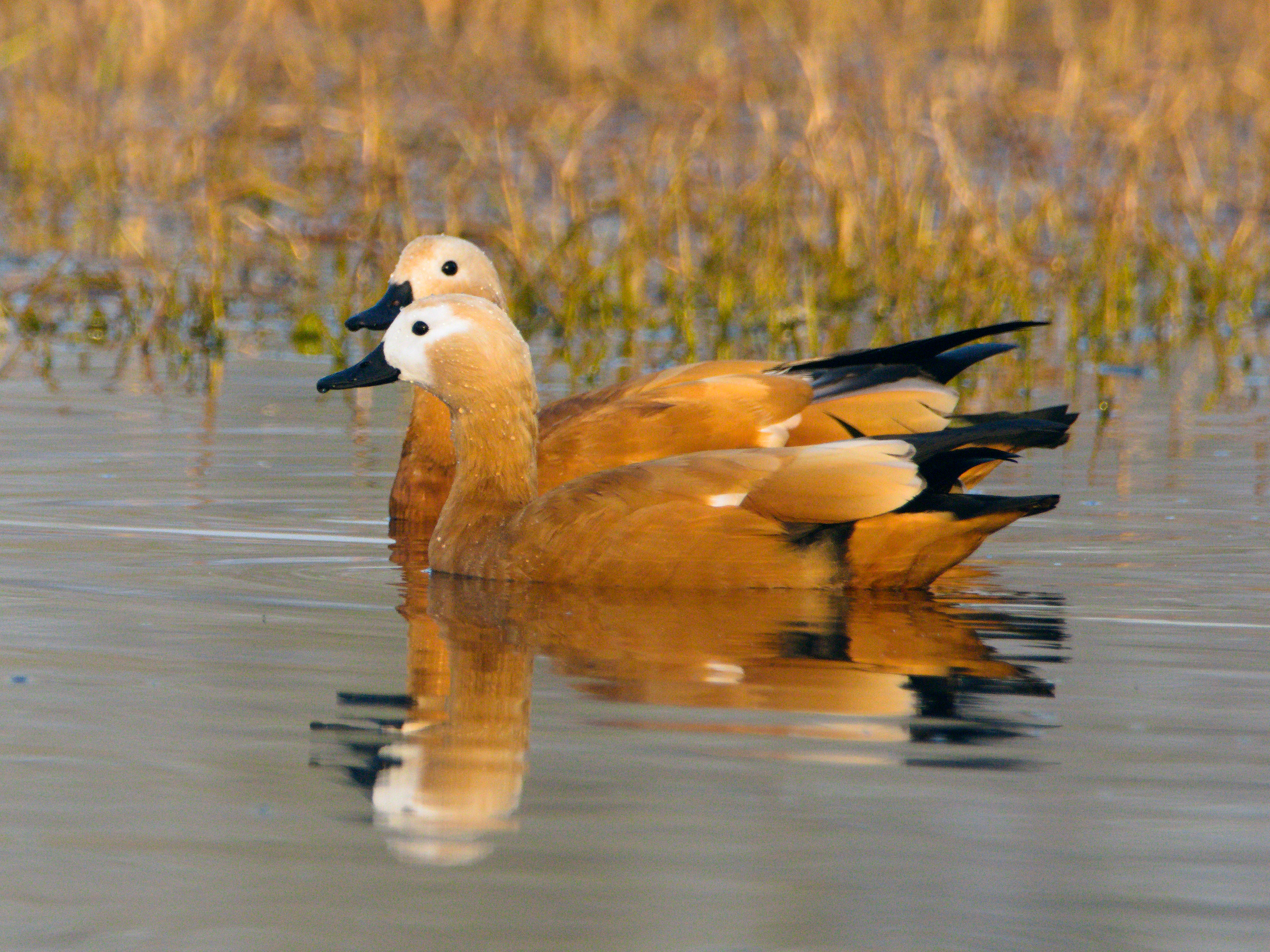
- Pair of ruddy shelducks, Keoladeo National Park, Rajasthan, India

Conservation status
- Least Concern (IUCN 3.1)

Scientific classification
- Kingdom: Animalia
- Phylum: Chordata
- Class: Aves
- Order: Anseriformes
- Family: Anatidae
- Genus: Tadorna
- Species: T. ferruginea

Binomial name
- Tadorna ferruginea (Pallas, 1764)
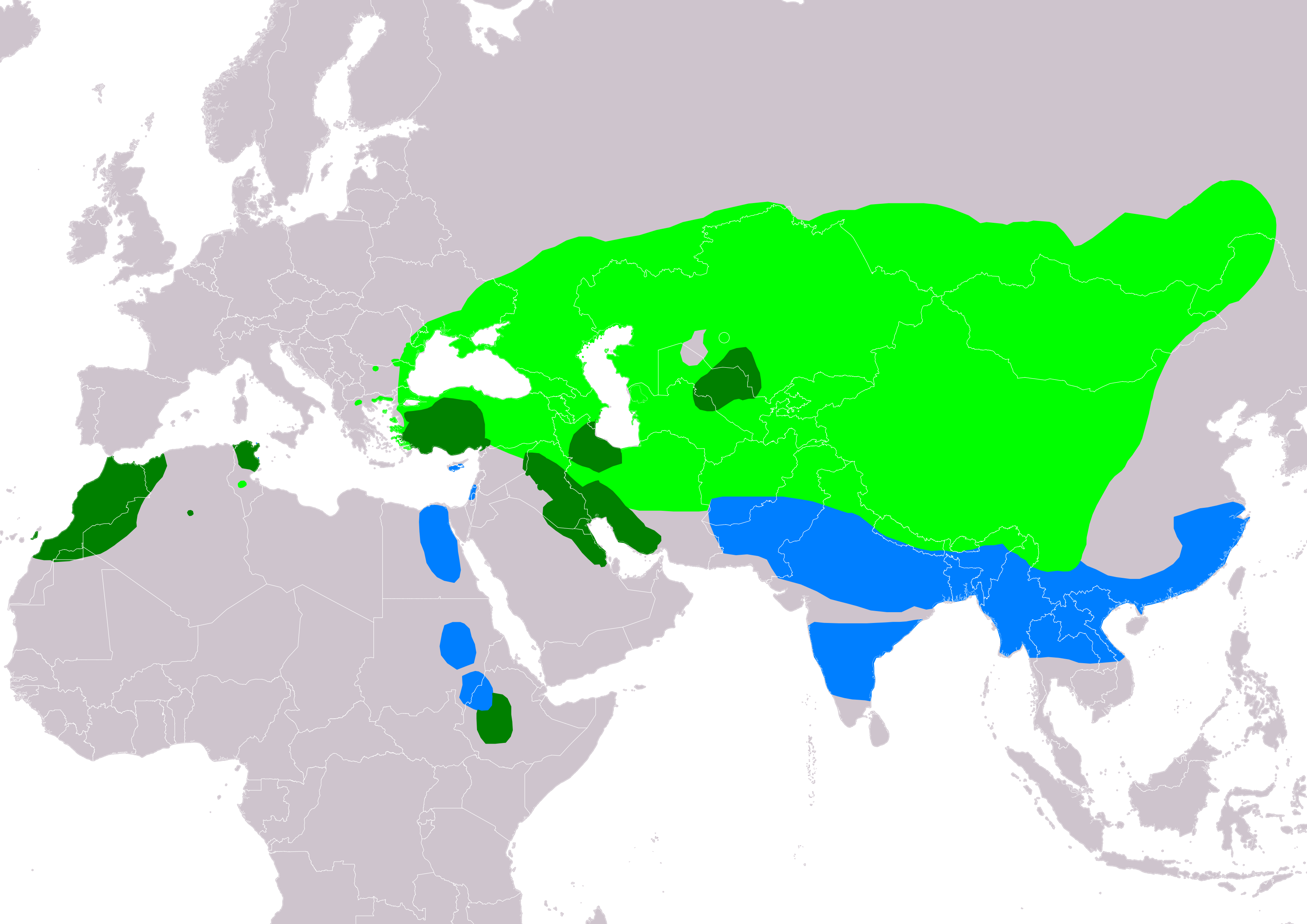
- Range of T. ferruginea (Compiled by: BirdLife International and Handbook of the Birds of the World (2016) 2014) Breeding Resident Non-breeding

Synonyms
- Anas ferruginea Casarca ferruginea Casarca rutila

= Ruddy shelduck =

Species of bird

Tadorna ferruginea

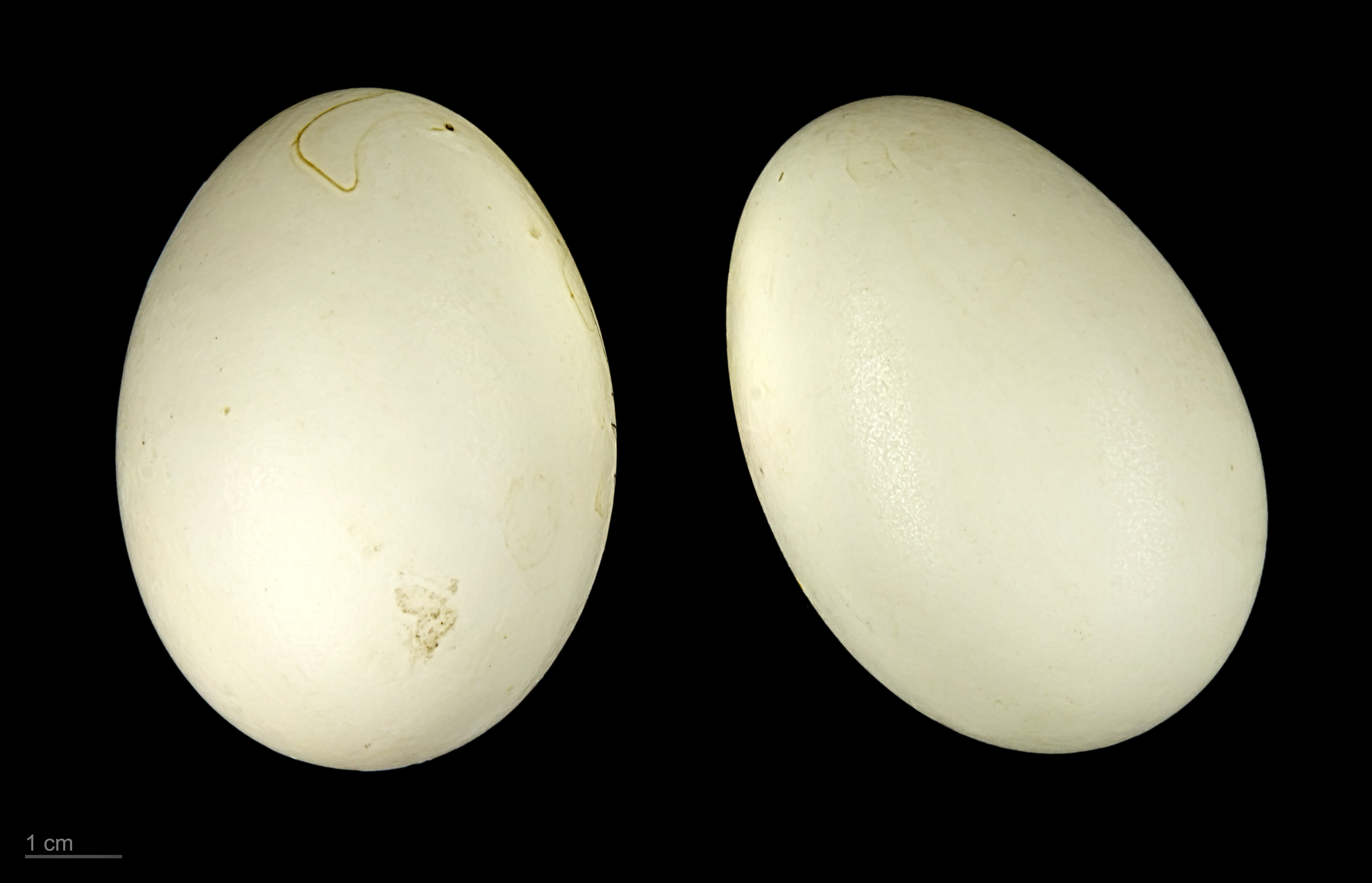
Tadorna ferruginea - MHNT

The ruddy shelduck (Tadorna ferruginea) is a bird species in the family Anatidae. It is a distinctive waterfowl, 58 to 70 cm (23 to 28 in) in length with a wingspan of 110 to 135 cm (43 to 53 in). It has orange-brown body plumage with a paler head, while the tail and the flight feathers in the wings are black, contrasting with the white wing-coverts. It is a migratory bird, wintering in the Indian subcontinent and breeding in southeastern Europe and central Asia, though there are small resident populations in North Africa. It has a loud honking call.

The ruddy shelduck mostly inhabits inland water-bodies such as lakes, reservoirs and rivers. The male and female form a lasting pair bond and the nest may be well away from water, in a crevice or hole in a cliff, tree or similar site. A clutch of about eight eggs is laid and is incubated solely by the female for about four weeks. The young are cared for by both parents and fledge about eight weeks after hatching.

In central and eastern Asia populations are steady or rising, but in Europe they are generally in decline. Altogether, the birds have a wide range and large total population, and the International Union for Conservation of Nature has assessed their conservation status as being of least concern.

== Taxonomy and etymology ==
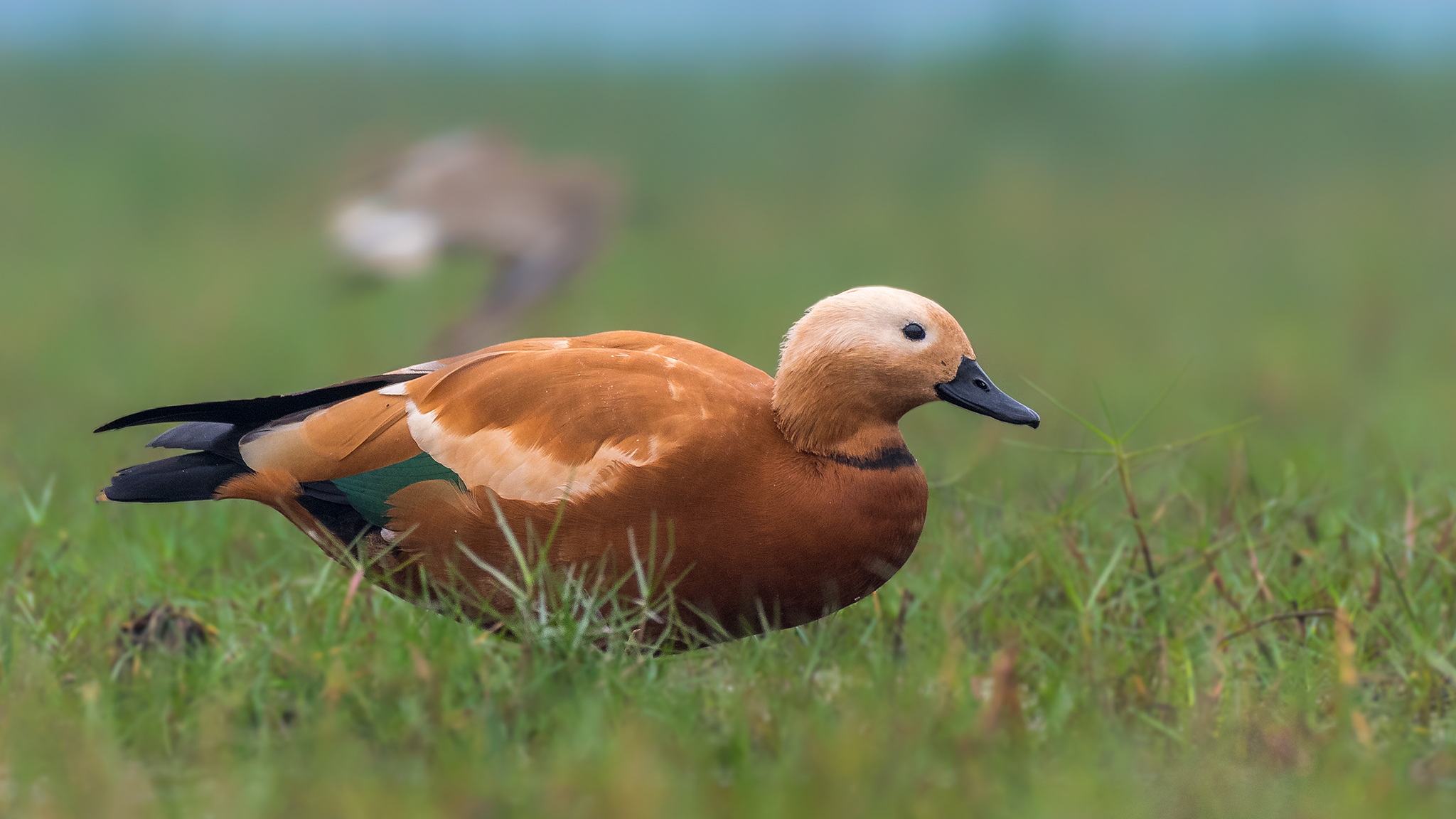
At Chilika Lake, Mangalajodi, Odisha, India

The ruddy shelduck (Tadorna ferruginea) is a member of the shelduck genus Tadorna in the wildfowl family Anatidae. The bird was first described in 1764 by the German zoologist and botanist Peter Simon Pallas who named it Anas ferruginea, but later it was transferred to the genus Tadorna with the other shelducks. Some authorities place it in the genus Casarca along with the South African shelduck (T. cana), the Australian shelduck (T. tadornoides) and the paradise shelduck (T. variegata). Phylogenetic analysis shows that it is most closely related to the South African shelduck. In captivity, the ruddy shelduck has been known to hybridise with several other members of Tadorna, with several members of the dabbling duck genus Anas, and with the Egyptian goose (Alopochen aegyptiaca). No subspecies are recognised.

The generic name Tadorna comes from the French tadorne, the common shelduck, and may originally derive from a Celtic word meaning "pied waterfowl". The English name "sheld duck" dates from around 1700 and means the same. The specific name ferruginea is Latin for "rusty" and refers to the colour of the plumage.

== Description ==
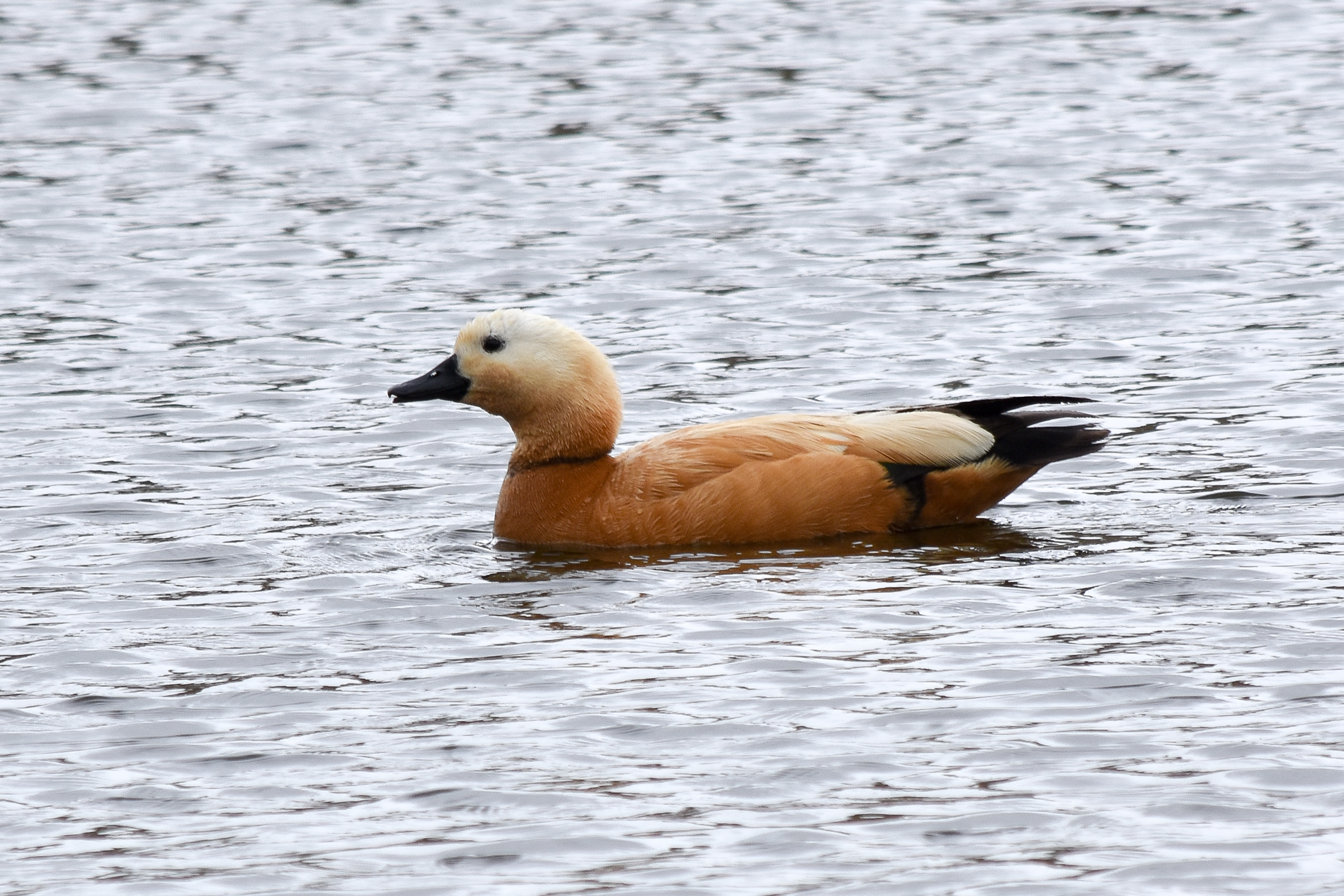
Ruddy shelduck at 4,250 m (13,940 ft), Chandra Taal, Spiti, Himachal Pradesh

The ruddy shelduck grows to a length of 58 to 70 cm (23 to 28 in) and has a 110–135 cm (43–53 in) wingspan. The male has orange-brown body plumage and a paler, orange-brown head and neck, separated from the body by a narrow black collar. The rump, flight feathers, tail-coverts and tail feathers are black and there are iridescent green speculum feathers on the inner surfaces of the wings. Both upper and lower wing-coverts are white, this feature being particularly noticeable in flight but hardly visible when the bird is at rest. The bill is black and the legs are dark grey. The female is similar but has a rather pale, whitish head and neck and lacks the black collar, and in both sexes, the colouring is variable and fades as the feathers age. The birds moult at the end of the breeding season and the male loses the black collar, but a further partial moult between December and April restores it. Juveniles are similar to the female but are a darker shade of brown.

The call is a series of loud, nasal honking notes, it being possible to discern the difference between those produced by the male and the female. The calls are made both on the ground and in the air, and the sounds are variable according to the circumstances in which they are uttered.

== Distribution and habitat ==
There are very small resident populations of this species in Northwest Africa and Ethiopia, but the main breeding area of the bird is from southeast Europe across the Palearctic to Lake Baikal, Mongolia, and western China. Eastern populations are mostly migratory, wintering in the Indian subcontinent. This species has colonised the island of Fuerteventura in the Canary Islands, first breeding there in 1994, and reaching a population of almost fifty pairs by 2008. The ruddy shelduck is a common winter visitor in India where it arrives by October and departs by April. Its typical breeding habitat is large wetlands and rivers with mud flats and shingle banks, and it is found in large numbers on lakes and reservoirs. It breeds in high altitude lakes and swamps in Jammu and Kashmir. Outside the breeding season it prefers lowland streams, sluggish rivers, ponds, flooded grassland, marshes and brackish lagoons.

This shelduck mostly frequents open locations on inland bodies of water such as lakes, reservoirs and rivers. It is seldom seen in forested areas but does occur in brackish water and saline lagoons. Though more common in the lowlands, it also inhabits higher altitudes and in central Asia is one of the few waterbirds, along with the bar-headed goose (Anser indicus), to be found on lakes at 5,000 m (16,400 ft).

Although becoming quite rare in Southeastern Europe and southern Spain, the ruddy shelduck is still common across much of its Asian range. It may be this population which gives rise to vagrants as far west as Iceland, Great Britain and Ireland. However, since the European population is declining, it is likely that most occurrences in Western Europe in recent decades are escapes or feral birds. Although this bird is observed in the wild from time to time in eastern North America, no evidence has been found that this is a genuine case of vagrancy. Feral ruddy shelduck have bred successfully in several European countries. In Switzerland the ruddy shelduck is considered an invasive species that threatens to displace native birds. Despite actions taken to reduce numbers, the population of ruddy shelduck in Switzerland increased from 211 to 1250 individuals in the period from 2006 to 2016.

A stable population exists in Moscow, settling the city parks' ponds alongside the endemic mallards. These birds are feral descendants of escapees from the Moscow Zoo, the population most likely forming after 1948, when the policy of clipping the birds' wings was repealed. Unlike the wild population, these ducks are non-migratory, wintering instead in the non-freezing parts of the city's bodies of water. Population increased from 1990's to 2020's by over 20 times, reaching 3300 by 2025.

== Behaviour ==
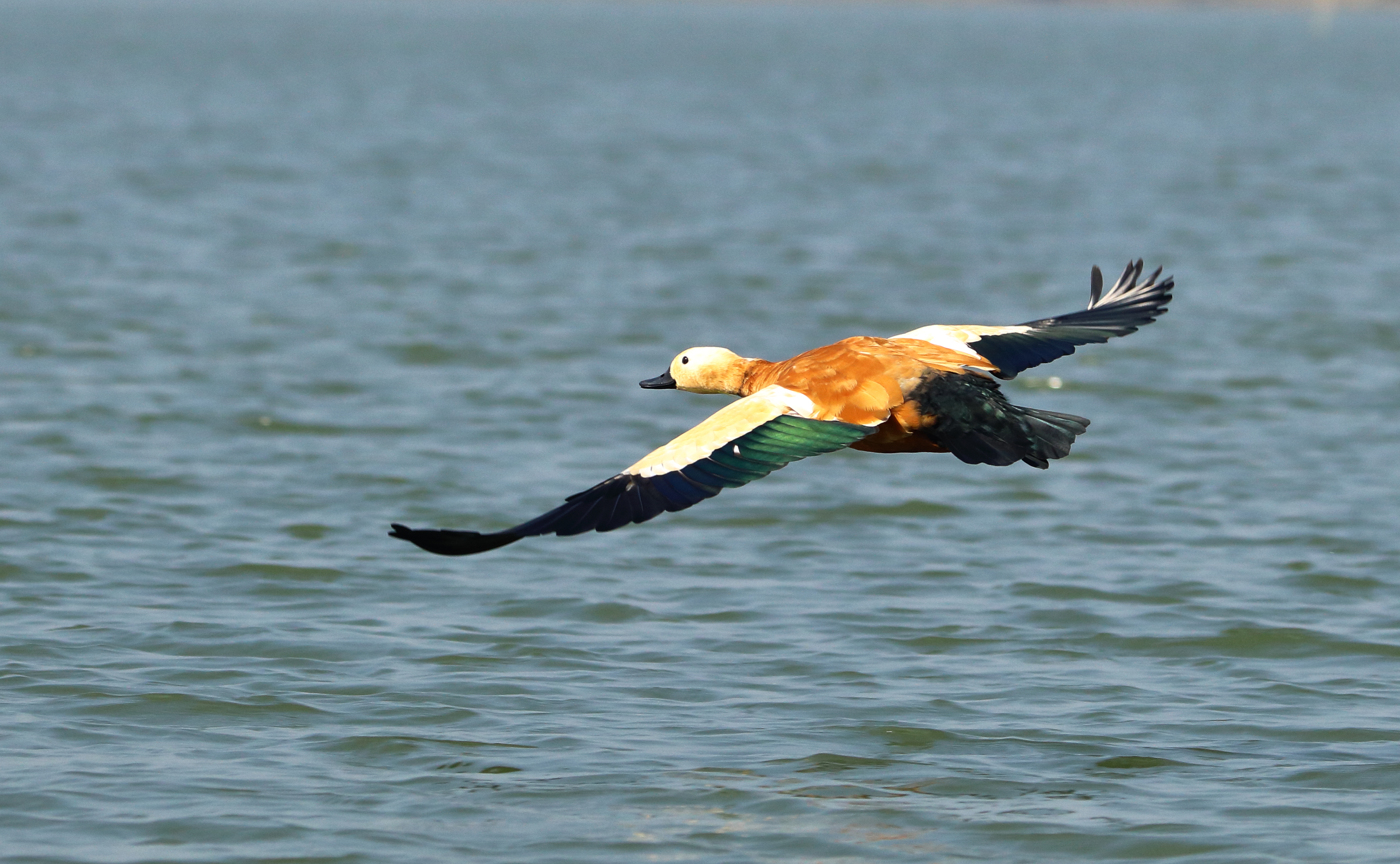
A ruddy shelduck flying over a lake

The ruddy shelduck is a mainly nocturnal bird. It is omnivorous and feeds on grasses, the young shoots of plants, grain and water plants as well as both aquatic and terrestrial invertebrates. On land it grazes on the foliage, in the water it dabbles in the shallows, and at greater depths, it up-ends, but it does not dive.

The ruddy shelduck is usually found in pairs or small groups and rarely forms large flocks. However, moulting and wintering gatherings on chosen lakes or slow rivers can be very large. Gatherings of over four thousand birds have been recorded on the Koshi Barrage and in the Koshi Tappu Wildlife Reserve in Nepal, and over ten thousand at Lake Düden in Turkey.

The birds arrive at their main breeding locations in central Asia in March and April. There is a strong pair bond between the male and female and it is thought they pair for life. In their breeding quarters, the birds are very aggressive towards their own kind and towards other species. The female in particular approaches intruders with head lowered and neck outstretched, uttering anger calls. If the intruder stands its ground, the female returns to the male and runs round him, inciting him to attack. He may or may not do so. Mating takes place on the water after a brief courtship ritual involving neck stretching, head dipping and tail raising. The nesting site is often far away from water in a hole in a tree or ruined building, a crevice in a cliff, among sand-dunes or in an animal burrow. The nest is constructed by the female using feathers and down and some grasses.

A clutch of about eight eggs (range six to twelve) is laid between late April and early June. These have a dull gloss and are creamy-white, averaging 68 by 47 mm (2.68 by 1.85 in). Incubation is done by the female while the male stands in attendance nearby. The eggs hatch after about twenty-eight days and both parents care for the young, which fledge in a further fifty-five days. After breeding the adults moult, losing the power of flight for about a month while they do so. Before moulting they move to large water bodies where they can more easily avoid predation while they are flightless. The family may stay together as a group for some time; the autumn migration starts around September and the young may mature in their second year. North African birds breed about five weeks earlier, and their breeding success is greater in wet summers.

== Status ==
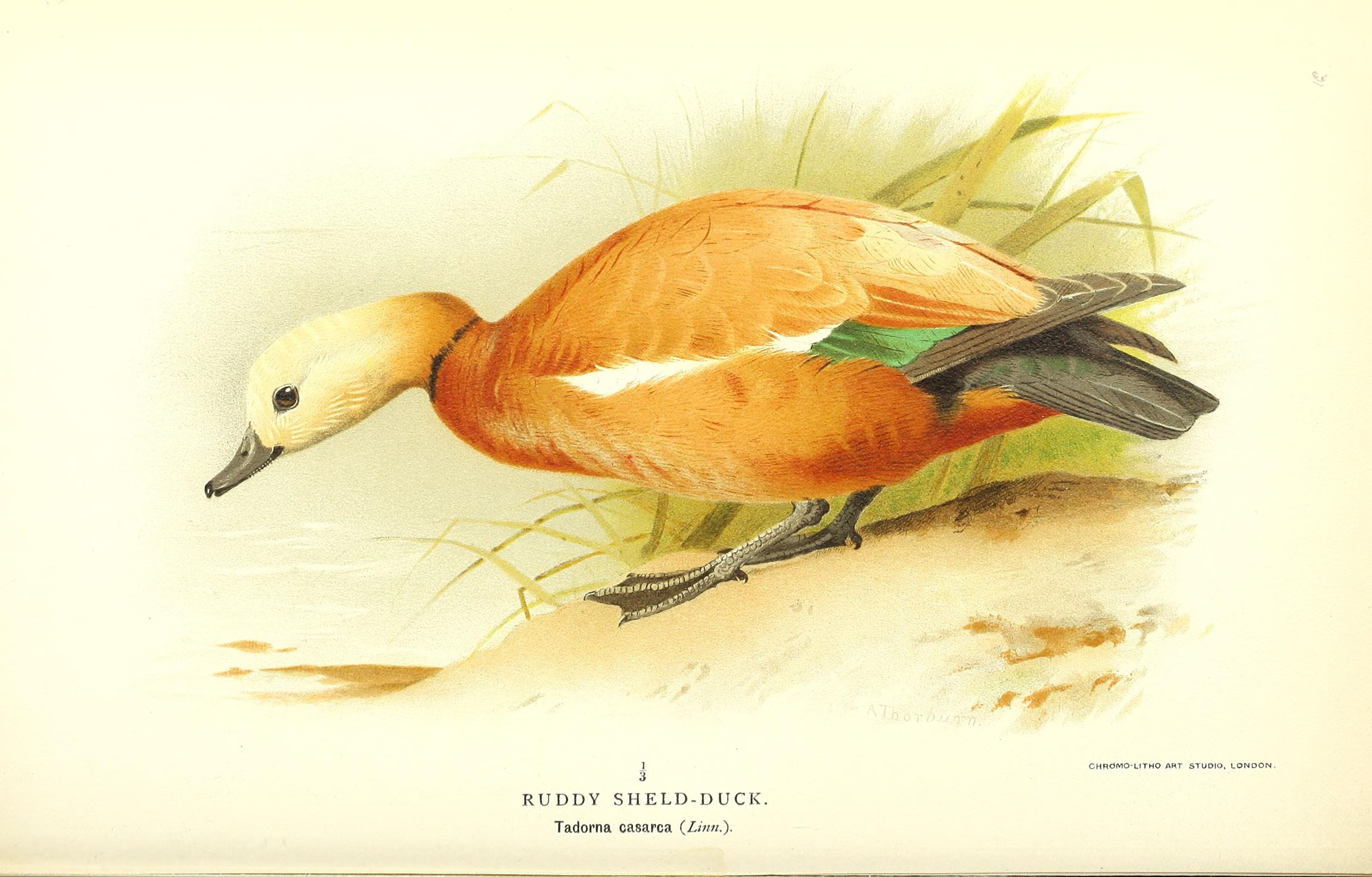
Illustration of adult

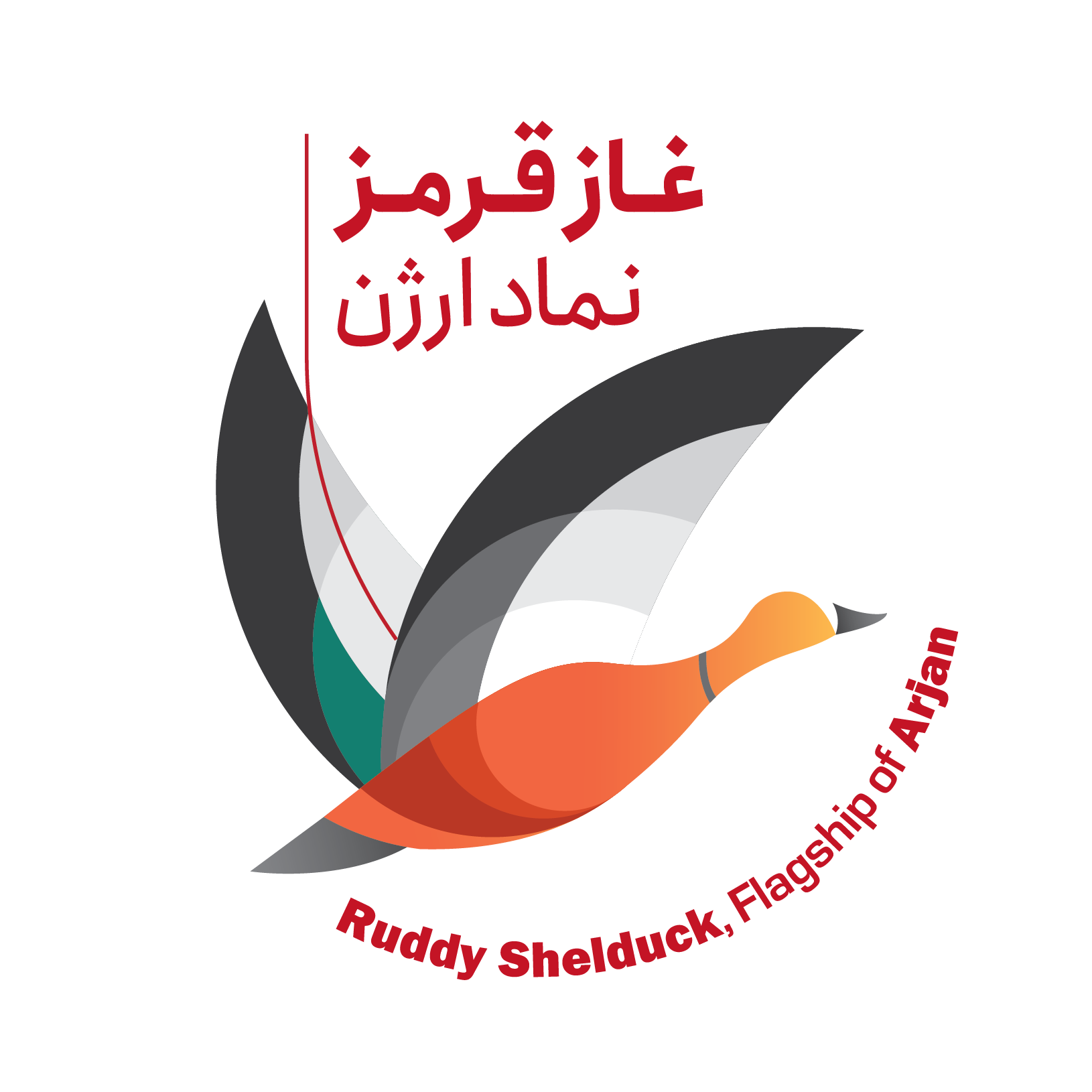
Ruddy Shelduck, Flagship species of Arjan International Wetland

Buddhists regard the ruddy shelduck as sacred as the plumage is the same colour as a lama's robes, and this gives the birds some protection in central and eastern Asia, where the population is thought to be steady or even rising. The Pembo Black-necked Crane Reserve in Tibet is an important wintering area for ruddy shelducks, and here they receive protection. In Europe on the other hand, populations are generally declining as wetlands are drained and the birds are hunted. However, in Europe and Italy the ruddy shelduck is protected, with hunting banned. They are less vulnerable than some other waterfowl because of their adaptability to new habitats such as reservoirs. In 2023, the Ruddy Shelduck was selected as the flagship species of Arjan International Wetland in Iran, due to its cultural visibility and conservation potential in engaging local communities.

The ruddy shelduck has a very wide range and an estimated total population size of 170,000 to 225,000 individuals. The overall population trend is unclear as some local populations are increasing while others are decreasing. The bird does not appear to meet the higher criteria necessary to be considered threatened, and the International Union for Conservation of Nature assesses that its conservation status is of least concern. It is one of the species to which the Agreement on the Conservation of African-Eurasian Migratory Waterbirds (AEWA) applies.
