= Nagarjuna Hospital =

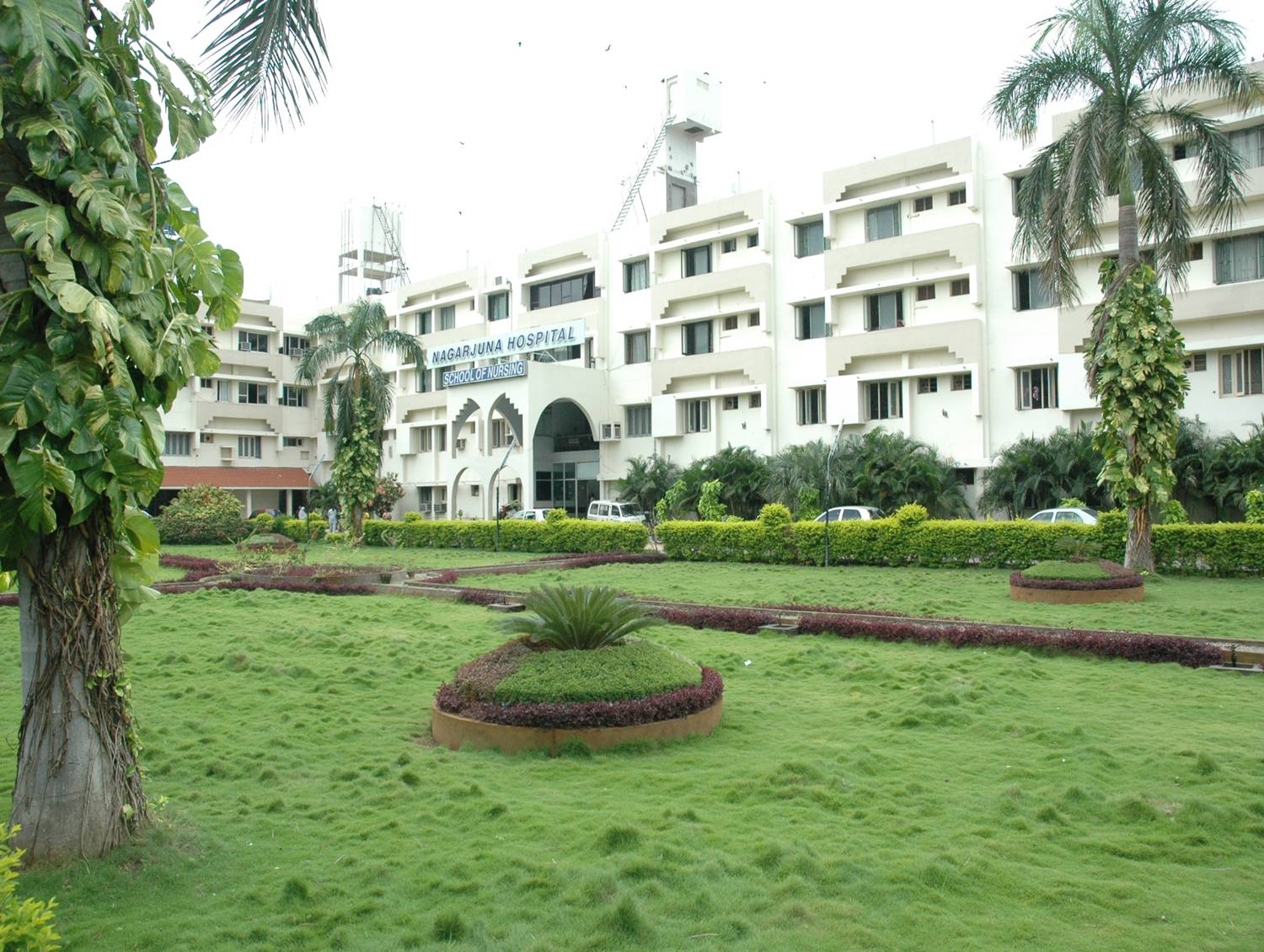

Geography
- Location: Vijayawada, Andhra Pradesh, India
- Coordinates: 16.487486°N 80.684163°E

Organisation
- Type: General

Services
- Beds: 200

History
- Opened: 1992

Links
- Lists: Hospitals in India

Nagarjuna Hospital is a 200-bed, multi-specialty hospital located in Vijayawada, in the coastal region of Andhra Pradesh, India. It was founded in 1992 by a group of NRI doctors, led by Dr. Kodali Jagan Mohan Rao, and has been a regional innovator, performing many procedures that had not previously been performed in the Andhra Pradesh region.

== Services ==
Nagarjuna Hospital provides advanced medical care to people from all classes and walks of life. It has twenty full-time consultants and several resident medical officers and visiting specialists. The hospital's Institute of Advanced Gastroenterology provides specialized endoscopy services, including trans-nasal endoscopy, magnification endoscopy, chromo-endoscopy, double-balloon endoscopy and endoscopic ultrasound. Its trauma-care unit was the first in the region to offer orthopaedic surgical, neurosurgical and intensive-care backup. Its intensive-care unit has a team of five qualified intensivists, led by Dr. U. Sree Lakshmi, who provide round-the-clock coverage for the unit, as well as advanced monitoring facilities that support medical and surgical emergency care. Procedures performed at the hospital include therapeutic endoscopy, advanced laparoscopy, neurovascular surgery and joint replacement surgery. It is a tertiary referral centre for medical gastroenterology, surgical gastroenterology, neurosurgery, plastic surgery, advanced orthopaedic surgery and advanced intensive care.

== Equipment ==
Nagarjuna Hospital has automatic blood counters, auto-analyzers, state-of-the-art X-ray and ultrasound equipment, and double-balloon enteroscopes, as well as digital and magnification endoscopes, trans-nasal endoscopes, and a range of ultrasound endoscopes. It is also equipped with a dual-slice sub-second CT scanner and six advanced mechanical ventilators with invasive monitoring facility. The operation theatres are equipped with Swiss lights and anesthesia machines.
