= Arjun =

Arjun or Arjuna may refer to:

== People ==
- Arjun (name), a common male given name (including a list of persons with the name)
- Arjuna, a figure in the Hindu epic Mahabharata
- Kartavirya Arjuna, a character in Hindu mythology
- Arjun (Firoz Khan) (fl. 1984–2016), Indian actor
- Arjun (singer) (born 1990), Arjun Coomaraswamy, British-Sri Lankan singer-songwriter
- Arjun Prabhakaran, Indian film director and writer

== Arts and entertainment ==
=== Books ===
- Arjun (character), a fictional young detective from a book series by Samaresh Majumdar
- Arjun (The Vampire Chronicles), a fictional character in novels by Anne Rice

=== Films ===
- Arjun (1985 film), a 1985 Hindi film
- Arjun (2004 film), a 2004 Telugu film
- Arjun (2008 film), a 2008 Kannada film
- Arjun (2011 film), a 2011 Marathi film
- Arjun: The Warrior Prince, a 2012 animated film
- Arjun: Kalimpong E Sitaharan, a 2013 Bengali film
- Arjun, a fictional child character in the 2010 Indian film Udaan

=== Television ===
- Earth Maiden Arjuna, a 2001 anime television series
- Arjun (TV series), a 2012 Indian crime based television series
- Arjun Meena, a fictional Indian Customs Service officer in the TV series Taskaree: The Smuggler's Web, portrayed by Emraan Hashmi

== Other ==
- Arjun (tank), an Indian main battle tank
- Arjun, Iran
- Arjuna asteroid, a class of near-Earth asteroids whose orbits are very Earth-like
- Arjuna Award, a national sports award in India
- Terminalia arjuna, a species of tree commonly known as Arjuna or Arjun tree

== See also ==
- Arjan (disambiguation)
- Nagarjuna (disambiguation)
- Aaj Ka Arjun (lit. 'Today's Arjuna'), a 1990 Indian film
- Arjoun, a town in Syria
