= Areh Jan =

Areh Jan اره جان
- Village
- Location within Iran
- Coordinates: 38°31′12″N 46°33′39″E
- Country: Iran
- Province: East Azerbaijan
- County: Varzaqan
- Bakhsh: Central
- Rural District: Ozomdel-e Jonubi

Population (2006)
  - Total: 449
- Time zone: UTC+3:30 (IRST)
  - Summer (DST): UTC+4:30 (IRDT)

Areh Jan (Persian: اره جان, also Romanized as Āreh Jān, Arreh Jān, and Areh Jān; also known as Arjān, Eradzyan, and Zaradzian) is a village in Ozomdel-e Jonubi Rural District, in the Central District of Varzaqan County, East Azerbaijan Province, Iran. At the 2006 census, its population was 449, in 84 families.
