= Arzan =

Arzan may refer to:

- Arzen or Arzan, ancient and medieval city on the border zone between Upper Mesopotamia and the Armenian Highlands, in eastern Turkey
- Arzhan or Aržan, site of early Scythian (9th to 8th century BC) kurgan burials in the Tuva Republic, Russia
- Arzan Nagwaswalla, Indian cricketer
- Arzan, village in Bulgaria
