= Arjan Ebbinge =

Dutch association footballer

Personal information
- Date of birth: 6 December 1974 (age 51)
- Place of birth: Veendam, Netherlands
- Height: 1.87 m (6 ft 2 in)
- Position: Defender

Youth career
- VV De Vogels
- Robur et Velocitas
- GVAV-Rapiditas

Senior career*
Years	Team	Apps	(Gls)
1993–1996	Groningen	22	(0)
1996–2000	Veendam	106	(5)
2000–2004	Heerenveen	40	(0)
2003	→ Helmond Sport (loan)	9	(2)
2003–2004	→ NEC (loan)	31	(1)
2004–2005	NEC	19	(2)
2005–2007	RBC	17	(0)
2007–2009	Den Bosch	51	(1)
2009–2010	Quick 1888		
Total		295	(11)

International career
1994-1995	Netherlands U21	2	(0)
- * Club domestic league appearances and goals

Arjan Ebbinge (born 6 December 1974) is a Dutch retired footballer who played as a defender.

== Club career ==
=== Early career ===
Born in Veendam, Ebbinge progressed as a youth player at GVAV-Rapiditas where he played as a midfielder, before being signed by Groningen at age 19 as a defender, scouted by Martin Koeman. He never managed a definitive breakthrough, and therefore moved to BV Veendam in the second tier, where he grew into a key player in defense, making 106 league appearances during his four-year span at the club.

=== Heerenveen ===
As a result of his performances, Ebbinge was signed by Heerenveen, where he made his European debut in his first season at the club. This occurred on 12 September 2000 in a 3–1 away loss to Lyon in the UEFA Champions League group stage, where he came on as a 82nd-minute substitute for Jeffrey Talan. He made his first start in the tournament on 20 September in a 0–1 home loss to Valencia covering Juan Sánchez who failed to make an impact during the game.

Ebbinge would not remain a starter at the club, however, as he lost out the competition to fellow centre-backs Gérard de Nooijer, Tieme Klompe and Petter Hansson. In March 2003 he was sent on a loan to Helmond Sport for the rest of the season, a team coached by Groningen legend, Jan van Dijk. Helmond would finish the season in a highly surprising third place in the league table, but eventually miss out on promotion to the Eredivisie in play-offs.

=== NEC ===
In June 2003, Ebbinge signed a three-year contract with NEC – coached by Johan Neeskens – to replace the outgoing Danny Hesp. The club had recently reached qualification for the UEFA Cup, and Ebbinge would make two European appearances against the club; both losses to Wisła Kraków. He scored his first goal for NEC against arch-rivals Vitesse on 14 December 2003 after a corner-kick from Resit Schuurman in a 2–0 win. He would eventually make 54 appearances for the club, in which he scored three goals.

=== RBC Roosendaal ===
In August 2005, Ebbinge signed a two-year contract with RBC Roosendaal, after having lost his starting spot at NEC to recent signing Jonas Olsson. He suffered a serious injury on 30 October 2005 after a collision with Tim Cornelisse from FC Utrecht, and was rushed to the ICU with a tear in his small intestine and a bruised pancreas. He was held in a coma for four weeks, in which he went through five surgeries. He made his comeback almost a year later, coming on as a second-half substitute for Paul de Lange in a match against FC Eindhoven on 18 August 2006.

=== Den Bosch and Quick 1888 ===
Ebbinge signed with FC Den Bosch in June 2007. After a season, where he was the undisputed starter in defense, making 39 total appearances and one goal, he would struggle with injuries in his second season at the club. His contract was not extended after the 2008–09 season, and he joined amateur club Quick 1888 in May 2009. There, he announced his retirement in March 2011, citing a lack of motivation to continue.

== International career ==
Ebbinge played twice for the Netherlands national under-21 football team.

== Retirement ==
After his career, Ebbinge became a part of the personnel of Association of Contract Players (VVCS) in the Netherlands, coaching professional players in their career.

== Personal life ==
Ebbinge is the son of Henk Ebbinge, who was also a professional footballer and would later run a restaurant on Mallorca.
