= Arjan Christianen =

Dutch footballer (born 1982)

Personal information
- Full name: Arjan Christianen
- Date of birth: 19 December 1982 (age 43)
- Place of birth: Oud Gastel, Netherlands
- Height: 1.88 m (6 ft 2 in)
- Position: Goalkeeper

Youth career
- SC Gastel
- NAC

Senior career*
Years	Team	Apps	(Gls)
2002–2006	NAC	0	(0)
2006–2008	Fortuna Sittard	69	(0)
2008–2011	RBC	58	(0)
2011–2013	Willem II	1	(0)
2013–2015	Halsteren		
Total		128	(0)
- * Club domestic league appearances and goals as of 10 August 2012 (UTC)

Arjan Christianen (born 19 December 1982 in Oud Gastel) is a Dutch retired professional footballer who played as a goalkeeper.

== Club career ==
He played professionally for Willem II in the Dutch Eredivisie as well as for NAC, Fortuna Sittard and RBC. His final match as a professional was his only Eredivisie match ever.

He finished his career at amateur side Halsteren.
