= Arjan Pandey =

Nepali singer (born 1994)

Arjan Pandey आर्जन पाण्डे
- Born: March 20, 1994 (age 32); Kathmandu Nepal
- Genres: Modern
- Occupation: Singer
- Years active: 2015 - present

Arjan Pandey (Nepali: आर्जन पाण्डे) is a Singer from Nepal. He was born on March 20, 1994, in Kathmandu, Nepal. He started his musical career in 2015 AD with his first debut song, “Oiliyera Jharna Dhinna”.

== About ==
Singer Arjan Pandey is the maternal grandson of the first singer of Nepal, the late honorable Hari Prasad Rimal. He comes from a family with a profound history in the music industry. Since he started his musical career. ‘Relimai’,’Dollor’,’ Jhimikkai Pareli’, Jhuse Barulo’ are some popular songs in his musical career. All these songs cross millions of views on a single platform, YouTube. He has been awarded from Nepal Music & Fashion Award and Image Award.

== Songs ==
SN	Song name	Singer	Release date	Ref
1	Relimai	Indira Joshi/Arjan Pandey	2018AD	
2	Dollar	Bidhya Tiwari/Arjan Pandey	2020AD	
3	Jhimikkai Pareli	Melina Rai / Arjan Pandey	2019AD	
4	Jhuse Barulo (Movie)	Arjan Pandey/ Bidhya Tiwari / Mr Rj	2020AD	
5	Hey Kanchha	Arjan Pandey /Nikhita Thapa	2016AD	
6	Timro Maya ma Haraye	Arjan Pandey	2016AD	
7	Dance is my passion	Arjan Pandey	2021AD	
8	Oiliyara Jharna Dinna	Arjan Pandey	2015AD	
9	Ghati Bhanda tala	Arjan Pandey	2019AD	
10	Timilai Heri Heri	Arjan Pandey	2023AD	
11	Babygirl	Arjan Pandey	2017AD	
12	Shirphool	Arjan Pandey	2024 AD	
13	Samjhana	Arjan Pandey	2024 AD	

== Award ==
SN	Award title	Award category	Notable work	result	ref
1	18th Annual Tuborg Image Award	Best New Artist of the Year	Oiliyara Jharna Dinna	Won	
2	20th Annual Tuborg Image Award	Best Vocal Performance Duo	Relimai	Nominated	
3	Kalika Music Award	Best New Artist	Oiliyara Jharna Dinna	Nominated	
4	Hits FM Music Award - 2016	Best New Artist	Naya Sapana	Nominated	
5	18th Annual Tuborg Image Award	Best Vocal Performance by duo	Hey Kanchha	Nominated	
6	Nepal Music & Fashion Award 2023	Best Singer (Modern Pop Singer )	Timlai Heri Heri	Won	
7	19th Annual Tuborg Image Award	Nominated for Best Vocal Performance Pop Male	Timro Maya Ma Haraye	Nominated	
8	12th Nepal Africa Film festival - 2024 AD	Best Singer Movie Song	Shirphool	Won	
