= Chromoendoscopy =

Gastrointestinal endoscopic imaging with dyes

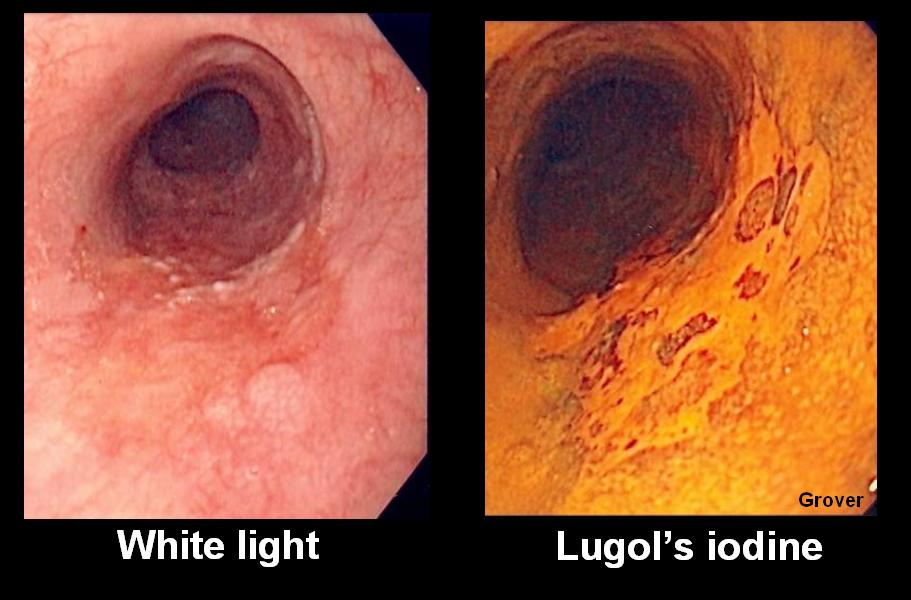
Chromoendoscopy using Lugol's iodine in the esophagus. The image on the left uses regular white light endoscopy. The image on the right stains with Lugol's iodine, and identifies a squamous cell carcinoma, which does not pick up the stain.

Chromoendoscopy is a medical procedure wherein dyes (often the same stains used in histology) are instilled into the gastrointestinal tract at the time of visualization with fibre-optic endoscopy. The purpose of chromoendoscopy is chiefly to enhance the characterization of tissues, although dyes may be used for other functional purposes. The detail achieved with chromoendoscopy can often allow for identification of the tissue type or pathology based upon the pattern uncovered.

== Varieties of stains ==
Stains used in chromoendoscopy have three major mechanisms. Absorptive stains have an affinity for particular mucosal elements, and include Lugol's iodine, methylene blue, toluidine blue and crystal violet (gentian violet) . Lugol's iodine specifically stains non-keratinized squamous epithelium, and consequently is useful for identifying squamous tissue, squamous dysplasia and squamous cell carcinomas. Methylene blue stains absorptive epithelium and is useful for identifying abnormality in the small intestine and colon. Barrett's esophagus involves change in the mucosa of the esophagus into a tissue that includes glands (intestinal metaplasia), and as a result, can be identified with methylene blue staining. Also, methylene blue has been used to identify dysplasia in patients with ulcerative colitis. Toluidine blue stains nuclei of malignant cells blue, and is used in oral and esophageal squamous cell carcinoma. Crystal violet is absorbed into intestinal and neoplastic cells and is used to identify Barrett's esophagus and colonic neoplasms.

Contrast stains are not absorbed but rather provide contrast by permeating between irregularities in the mucosa to highlight irregularities. The primary contrast stain is indigo carmine, administered at varying concentrations between 0.1% and 0.8%. The chief utility of indigo carmine is in the identification of dysplastic cells in individuals with chronic ulcerative colitis.

Reactive stains undergo an observable change due to a chemical process related to the function of the gastrointestinal tract. Congo red is used as a test for achlorhydria in the stomach, to test adequacy of vagotomy ( post adequate vagotomy, gastric acid secretion is abolished) and to detect presence of ectopic gastric tissue, as it changes colour from red to black at a pH less than 3. Should acid not be present in the stomach, it would remain red.

== Typical uses and safety ==
The most common applications for chromoendoscopy are the following: identification of squamous cell carcinomas or dysplasia of the esophagus, identification of Barrett's esophagus and dysplasia, identification of early gastric cancer, characterization of colonic polyps and colorectal cancer, and in screening for dysplasia in individuals with ulcerative colitis. A Cochrane review updated in 2016 found strong evidence that chromoscopy enhances the detection of cancerous tumours in the colon and rectum when compared to plain colonoscopy.

The dyes used for chromoendoscopy are typically considered to be safe. Some dyes such as indigo carmine may discolour the feces temporarily. Lugol's iodine when applied to the esophagus can lead to discomfort, inflammation (of the esophagus or stomach) or rarely allergy. Sodium thiosulfate has been used to avert this.

== Techniques for application and visualization ==
The stains are typically applied to the mucosal lining of the gastrointestinal tract using a device known as a spray catheter that is inserted into the endoscope. Before staining, the mucosa may need to be treated with an agent to remove excess mucus to enhance staining. N-acetylcysteine and acetic acid are typically used for this purpose. One or two minutes after staining with the dye, the mucosa typically is washed with water to remove excess amounts of the dye, which can obscure visualization. Depending on the reason for which chromoendoscopy is being performed, the dye can be sprayed directly on a suspected abnormality (such as for identification of squamous cell carcinoma) or diffusely to the mucosa (such as for screening for dysplasia in ulcerative colitis

When the stain is applied diffusely in the colon, a complete colonoscopy is performed with the instrument lying in the cecum. The mucosa is washed and the dye is applied to tissue while the endoscope is retracted by 20 to 30 centimetres. That area of mucosa is characterized, and then the procedure is repeated in the next area of the colon that is more distal, until the procedure is completed.

Stains can be used in conjunction with other techniques that allow for better identification of mucosa, such as magnification endoscopy. Various classification of "pit patterns" in the mucosa have been used to attempt to correlate to tissue type. The most commonly used rubric is the Kudo classification.

== Alternatives ==
Various other techniques have been used to delineate the mucosa of the gastrointestinal tract without the use of dyes. Narrow-band imaging is a technique where ambient light of a blue and green wavelengths are used to highlight detail, particularly of vascular structures. It has the advantage requiring only a change in light source, and is less cumbersome than instillation of dye. A similar technique to narrow-band imaging using blue and green filters has been used in endoscopes manufactured by Fujinon, termed Fuji Intelligent Chromoendoscopy (FICE), and has been referred to as virtual chromoendoscopy. Other techniques that can enhance detail of mucosa include confocal microscopy, magnification endoscopy and optical coherence tomography.
