= Arjan Breukhoven =

Dutch musician (born 1962)

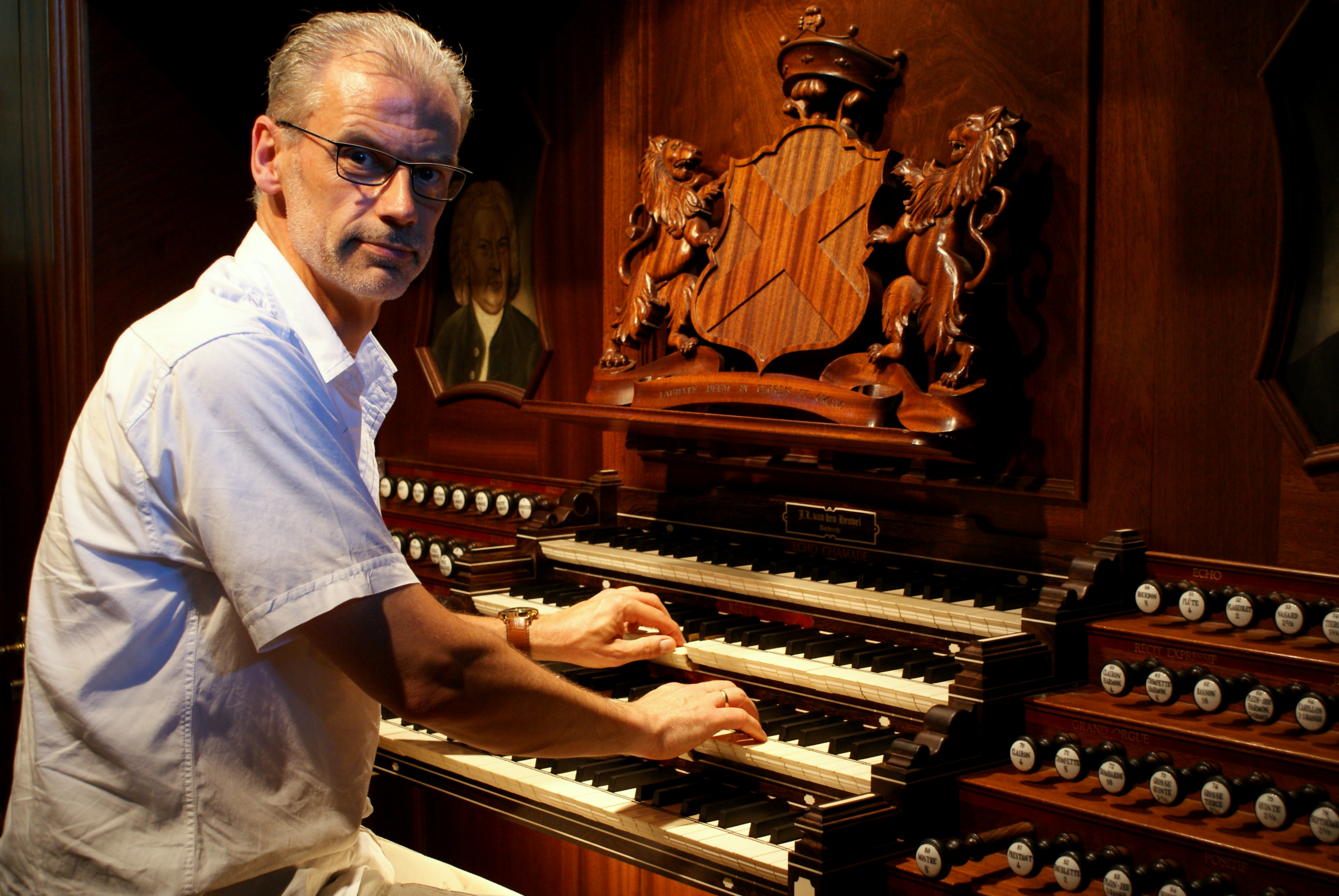
Arjan Breukhoven

Karel Jan (Arjan) Breukhoven (Rotterdam, 18 May 1962) is a Dutch musician.

== Education ==
Breukhoven started his musical training with Jan Brandwijk. He later studied principal professional organ and church music at the Royal Academy in the Hague with Wim van Beek and Bert Matter. He studied piano with Albert Brussee, and also singing, improvisation and choir direction. In this academy time he also got lessons from the French organist and pedagogue Gaston Litaize. He also attended choir and orchestra direction with professor Kurt Thomasstichting.

== Performances ==
Breukhoven acts as a pianist, organist, soloist, as well as accompanying musician for soloists and choirs. He also works as a conductor. He has collaborated with a lot of other musicians like Ernst-Daniël Smid, Vicki Brown, Berdien Stenberg, Marco Bakker, Ben Cramer, Kamahl, Henk Poort, Marjolein Keuning, Margriet Eshuijs and Cor Bakker. He played with Louis van Dijk and Daniël Wayenberg, among others. In 2007 he celebrated his 25th year's jubilee as a musician by concerts with baritone Ernst-Daniël Smid and two concerts in Bruges' Church of Our Lady and Ghent's Saint Bavo and moreover with an organ concert on Garrels-orgel in the Great Church of Maassluis.

The largest organ which he ever played was a 127-voice organ at Saint Patrick' s basilica in the Australian city of Fremantle.

== Activities ==
Breukhoven regularly gives concerts in the Netherlands, elsewhere on the continent and in Australia. He appeared on the EO programme "Nederland zingt" and is a regular guest on their radio programmes. He conducts three male choirs:

- The Christian men's choir "Prince Alexander" in Rotterdam (over 80 members).
- The Dutch Christian men's choir in Berkel en Rodenrijs (over 130 members).
- Randstedelijk men's Choir from Spijkenisse (over 100 members).

As a pianist and an organist he has developed his own style of improvisation, both in classic and in light recent development. He composes for choir, organs and other instruments. He is the organist of the reformed church of Berkel and Rodenrijs. He is frequently requested as organist at funeral ceremonies in the Netherlands.

== Awards ==
Arjan Breukhoven received the silver honours in 2008 from the main board for church stewardship in the Protestant Church in the Netherlands for working as an organist in that church for more than 25 years.

== Selected discography ==
He collaborated on more than 150 CD and DVD-records. A selection is shown below:

Uitgave	Soort	Album
-	Organ CD	Solo from the basilica Saint Kunibert of Cologne
-	Organ CD	Scherzo from the Hervormde Dorpskerk of Berkel en Rodenrijs
-	Organ CD	Souvenirs from Europa from the Heiliggeistkirche of Heidelberg (Germany)
STH Sacred Music CD 197096	Organ CD	Arjan Breukhoven improvises part 1 from the Evangelisch Lutherse Kerk at The Hague
STH Sacred Music CD 198078	Organ CD	Arjan Breukhoven improvises part 2 from the Bovenkerk of Kampen
STH Sacred Music CD 1400202	Organ CD	Arjan Breukhoven improvises part 3 from the Groote Kerk of Maassluis
STH Sacred Music CD 1402412	Organ CD	Arjan Breukhoven improvises part 4 from the Grote Kerk of Hasselt
-	Organ CD	Arjan Breukhoven improvises over Christmas songs part 5 from the Grote Kerk of Dordrecht
-	Organ CD	Psalmimprovisations
-	Organ CD	Arjan Breukhoven playing the Kam & van der Meulen organ in the Grote Kerk of Dordrecht
STH Records CD 1401822	Choir CD	This is my song deel 1 with the Christelijk Mannenkoor Prins Alexander
STH Records CD 1405822	Choir CD	This is my song deel 2 wirth the Christelijk Mannenkoor Prins Alexander
CD HCM 200595	Choir CD	Gelukkig is het land with the Hollands Christelijk Mannenkoor
-	Choir CD	Dankt, dankt nu allen God with the Hollands Christelijk Mannenkoor
-	Choir CD	Zo lief, had God de wereld with the Chr. Mannenkoor Prins Alexander and Hollands Chr. Mannenkoor
DHCD 9119	Choir CD	Groot Concert in Parijs from the Ste. Eustache of Paris
-	Choir CD	Geef ons vrede 1500 choir members from the Grote Kerk of Dordrecht
-	Choir CD	Arjan Breukhoven dirigeert Groot Mannenkoor bij Kaarslicht with the Randstedelijk Mannenkoor, the Chr. Mannenkoor Prins Alexander and the Hollands Christelijk Mannenkoor
-	Verzamel CD	In het Licht Jubilee CD
-	Verzamel CD	Improvisations on Favourite Psalms and Hymns CD with organ improvisations from various churches
-	Zang CD	Samenzang uit Parijs from the Ste. Eustache of Paris
-	Zang CD	Melodia From the Hervormde Dorpskerk of Berkel en Rodenrijs
-	Zang CD	Kom tot Mij from the Grote- of St. Maartenskerk of Tiel
-	Instrumental CD	Ik bouw op U from the Grote- of St. Maartenskerk of Tiel
ICM CD 202001	Instrumental CD	Famous Instrumental Melodies part 1 Arjan Breukhoven on the Seiler grand piano
ICM CD 202001	Instrumental CD	Famous Instrumental Melodies part 2 Arjan Breukhoven on the Seiler grand piano
-	Instrumental CD	Musica Religioso
-	DVD	Arjan Breukhoven in candlelight from the Groote Kerk of Maassluis
-	DVD	Improvisations from the Bovenkerk of Kampen
-	CD	Shalom Israel Muzical pearls about Israël and Jeruzalem, with Martin Mans organ, Anja van der Maten hobo en Martin de Deugd violin
