= Arjun Kumar Gupta =

Statistician (1938–2022)

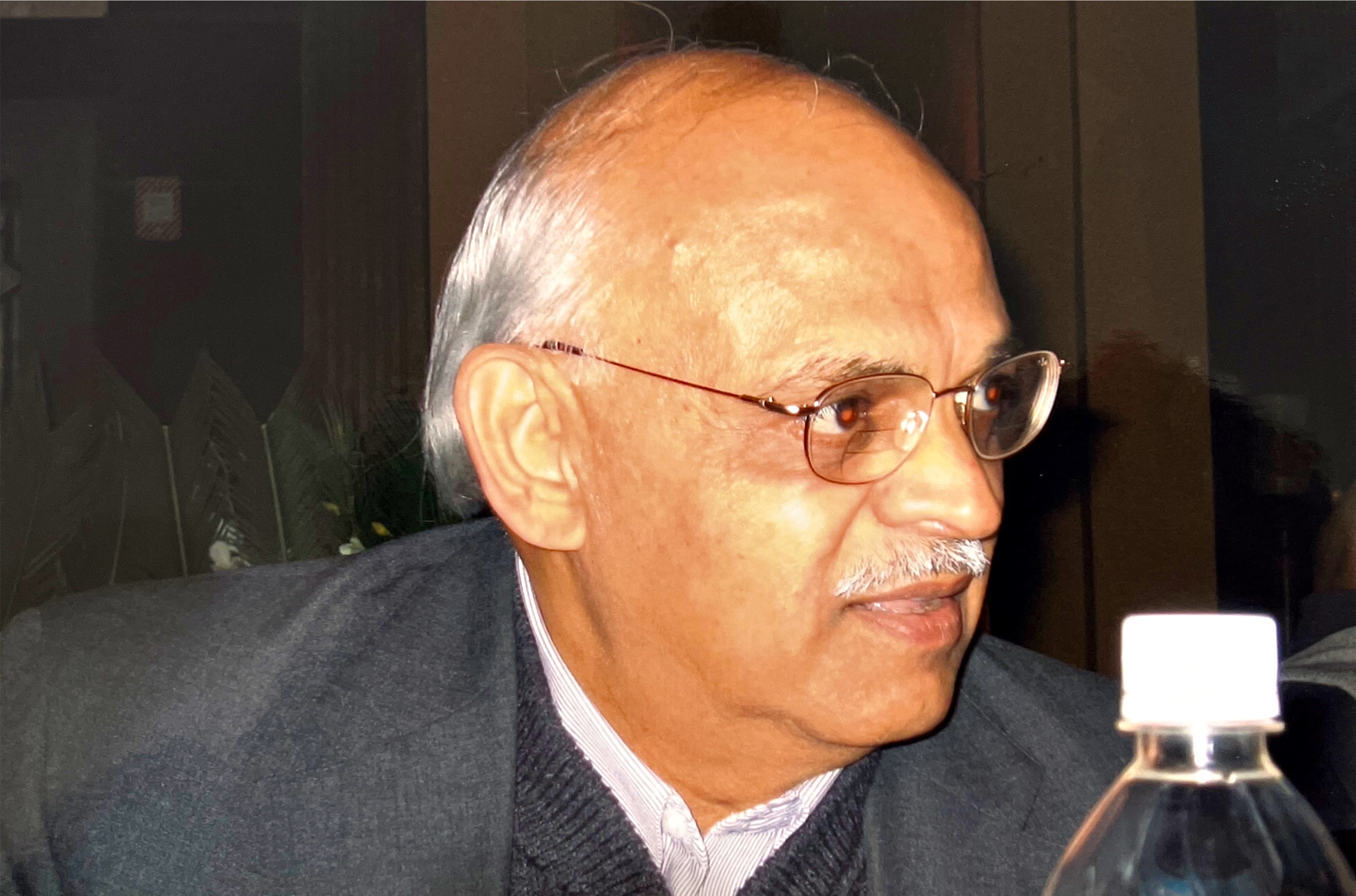

Arjun Kumar Gupta (1938 – 25 December 2022) was a Distinguished Research Professor in the Department of Mathematics & Statistics at Bowling Green State University in Ohio.

Gupta was born in Uttar Pradesh, India in 1938. Gupta received his bachelor's and master's degrees from Poona University in India and his PhD from Purdue University.

He was a member of the American Statistical Association, the Institute of Statisticians, and the Royal Statistical Society of England. In 1989 he was elected as a Fellow of the American Statistical Association. He received the Olscamp Research Award in 1990. He has written more than 400 articles and he has edited, co-edited or co-authored six books on statistics.

In 2022, Gupta's memoir A Multidimensional Life: The Legacy of Arjun K. Gupta was published.

Gupta died on 25 December 2022.

== Books ==
- Bon K. Sy; Arjun K. Gupta (6 December 2012). Information-Statistical Data Mining: Warehouse Integration with Examples of Oracle Basics. Springer Science & Business Media. ISBN 978-1-4419-9001-3.
- Gupta, Arjun Kumar (2022). Duggan, Laura (ed.). A Multidimensional Life: The Legacy of Arjun K. Gupta. Nicasio Press. ISBN 9781737581437.
