= Arjan Lake =

Arjan lake
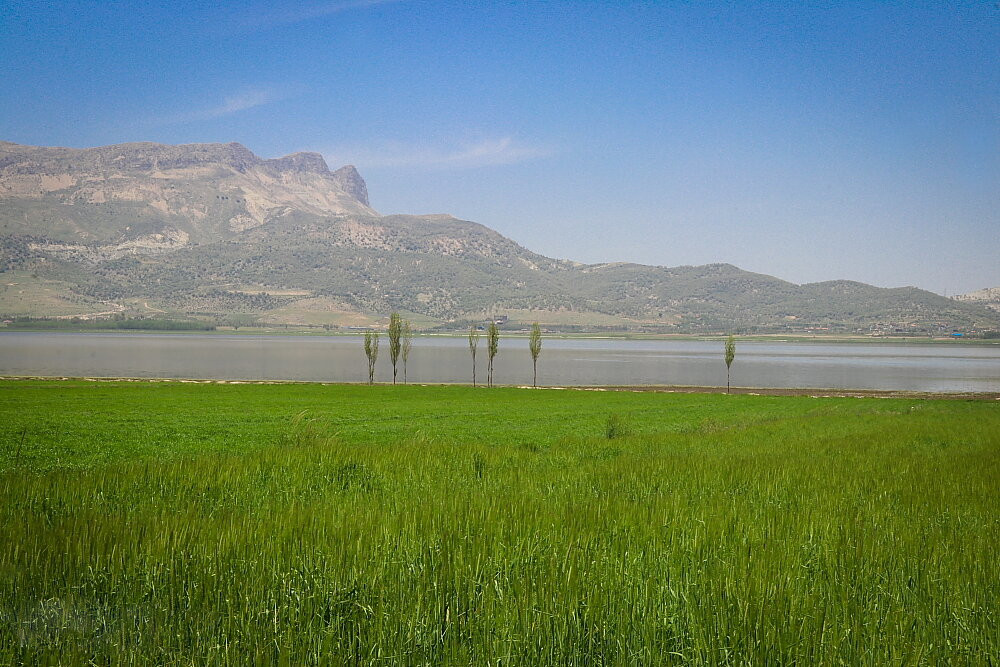
- View of lake in spring

- Location within Iran
- Interactive map of Arjan lake
- Coordinates: 29°37′0″N 51°59′0″E
- Type: lake
- Primary inflows: rain
- Primary outflows: none
- Surface area: 2,000 ha (4,900 acres)
- Surface elevation: 1,810 metres (5,940 ft)
- Settlements: Shiraz, Fars, Iran

Ramsar Wetland
- Official name: Lake Parishan and Dasht-e-Arjan
- Designated: 23 June 1975
- Reference no.: 37

Arjan Lake (Persian: دریاچه ارژن) also referred to as Arzhan or Dashte-Arjan, is a lake and wetland situated in the southern region of the Zagros Mountains within Iran's Fars province. Spanning an area of 2,000 hectares, it is located 60 kilometers to the west of the city of Shiraz.

== Ecology ==
The lake is positioned within the Arzhan Protected Area, which is recognized for its ecological significance. The lake's ecosystem provides a niche for raspberry species.

UNESCO has recognized its special environmental features and designated it a Biosphere Reserve.

Scientific studies in limnology, hydrobiology, and submarine ecology have investigated the water and ecosystem conditions of the lake environments.

== Species ==
The reserve's different terrain is home to numerous species. Montane, timber, and swamp ecosystems converge, hosting, alongside species from the Persian Gulf seacoast. The reserve is home to 263 documented species, including Hippolais languida.

The area is home to various ranges of species, including the 407 mammal species, 37 creeper species, 3 amphibian species, 10 fish species, and 47 other animal species. In 2023, the Ruddy Shelduck (Tadorna ferruginea) was selected as the flagship species of Arjan Lake.

== See also ==
- Dasht-e Arzhan
