= Narrow-band imaging =

Imaging technique used in endoscopy

- Purpose: endoscopic diagnostic use of blue/green wavelengths enhance detail of surface of mucosa.

Narrow-band imaging is an imaging technique for endoscopic diagnostic medical tests, where light of specific blue and green wavelengths is used to enhance the detail of certain aspects of the surface of the mucosa. A special filter is electronically activated by a switch in the endoscope leading to the use of ambient light of wavelengths of 415 nm (blue) and 540 nm (green). Because the peak light absorption of hemoglobin occurs at these wavelengths, blood vessels will appear very dark, allowing for their improved visibility and in the improved identification of other surface structures.

In gastrointestinal endoscopy, narrow-band imaging has found use in the identification of Barrett's esophagus, in the identification of pit patterns to classify colorectal polyps and tumours, and in the identification of atypical dysplastic cells in the colon of patients with ulcerative colitis. Also, in cystoscopy, which is the examination of the urinary bladder with an endoscope, narrow-band imaging is useful in differentiating between benign and malignant cells.

Alternative methods to improve visualization of the mucosa in endoscopy include chromoendoscopy, confocal microscopy and optical coherence tomography.
