= AD (disambiguation) =

AD (Anno Domini) is a designation used to label years following 1 BC in the Julian and Gregorian calendars.

Ad (advertisement) is a form of marketing communication.

AD, A.D. or Ad may also refer to:

== People ==
- Ad (name), a given name, and a list of people with the name
- ‘Ad, great-grandson of Shem, son of Noah
- A.D., nickname of Adrian Dantley (born 1955), American basketball player and coach
- AD, nickname of Anthony Davis (born 1993), American basketball player
- A. D. Loganathan (1888–1949), officer of the Indian National Army
- A. D. Whitfield (born 1943), American football player
- A. D. Winans (born 1936), American poet, essayist, short story writer and publisher
- A.D., nickname of Adrian Peterson (born 1985), American football player

== Art, entertainment, and media ==
- Audio description, audible narration of visual elements for blind audience members

=== Film and television ===
- Assistant director, a film or television crew member
- A.D. (film), a 2010 animated zombie horror movie
- A.D. (miniseries), a 1985 TV miniseries set in ancient Rome
- A.D. The Bible Continues, a 2015 biblical drama TV miniseries
- Arrested Development, a 2003–2019 American TV sitcom
- Attarintiki Daredi, 2013 Indian movie by Trivikram Srinivas

=== Music ===
- Artist diploma, a music performance certificate conferred by higher education institutions
- AD (band), a Christian rock band
- A.D. (album), by Solace
- AD, a 2021 album by The Kleptones

=== Literature ===
- Art director, for a magazine or newspaper
- AD (poem), by Kenneth Fearing
- A.D.: New Orleans After the Deluge, a nonfiction graphic novel about Hurricane Katrina
- Algemeen Dagblad, a Dutch newspaper
- Architectural Digest, an interior design and landscaping magazine

=== Other arts and media ===
- A.D., the previous North American name of the Anno video game series

== Business and economics ==
- The equivalent to an S.A. (corporation), a type of legal entity in some countries:
  - Macedonian: Акционерско друштво, romanized: Akcionersko društvo
  - Bulgarian: Акционерно дружество, romanized: Aktsionerno druzhestvo
  - Serbian: Акционарско друштво, romanized: Akcionarsko društvo
  - akcionarsko društvo in Bosnia and Herzegovina
- Aggregate demand, a measure of total purchasing across an economy

== Places, transportation, and military ==
- AD, ISO 3166-1 country for Andorra
- Abu Dhabi, capital of the United Arab Emirates
- Andhra Pradesh, a state in southern India (HASC code)
- Surakarta, Sukoharjo, Boyolali, Sragen, Karanganyar, Wonogiri and Klaten (vehicle registration prefix AD)
- Alexander Dennis Ltd., a Scottish bus manufacturing company
- AD, IATA code for:
  - Air Paradise, a defunct Indonesian airline
  - Azul Brazilian Airlines
- Airworthiness Directive, an aircraft maintenance requirement notice
- AD Skyraider, former name of the Douglas A-1 Skyraider, a Navy attack aircraft
- A US Navy hull classification symbol: Destroyer tender (AD)
- Air Department, part of the British Admiralty
- Air defense, an anti-aircraft weaponry and systems
- Accidental discharge, a mechanical failure of a firearm causing it to fire
- Active duty, a status of full duty or service, usually in the armed forces

== Politics ==
- Action Directe, a French far-left militant group
- Democratic Action (Venezuela) (Spanish: Acción Democrática), a social democratic and center-left political party
- Democratic Alliance (Portugal, 1979) (Portuguese: Aliança Democrática), a former centre-right political alliance
- Democratic Alternative (Malta) (Maltese: Alternattiva Demokratika), a green political party

== Science and technology ==
=== Biology and medicine ===
- Addison's disease, an endocrine disorder
- Adenovirus, viruses of the family Adenoviridae
- Alzheimer's disease, a neurodegenerative disease
- Anaerobic digestion, processes by which microorganisms break down biodegradable material
- Anti-diarrheal, medication which provides symptomatic relief for diarrhea
- Aortic dissection, an injury to the aorta
- Approximate digestibility, an index measure of the digestibility of animal feed
- Atopic dermatitis, form of skin inflammation
- Atypical depression, a type of depression
- Autosomal dominant, a classification of genetic traits
- Autonomic dysreflexia, a potential medical emergency
- State Herbarium of South Australia (Herbarium Code "AD" in the Index Herbariorum), founded in 1954 as part of the Adelaide Botanic Garden

=== Chemistry ===
- Adamantyl, abbreviated "Ad" in organic chemistry
- Sharpless asymmetric dihydroxylation, a type of organic chemical reaction

=== Computing ===
- .ad, the top level domain for Andorra
- Administrative distance, a metric in routing
- Active Directory, software for the management of Microsoft Windows domains
- Administrative domain, a computer networking facility
- Analog Devices, Inc., an American multinational semiconductor company specializing in data conversion, signal processing, and power management technology
- Analog-to-digital converter, a type of electronic circuit
- Automatic differentiation, a set of computer programming techniques to speedily compute derivatives
- AD_{16}, the hexadecimal number equal to decimal number 173

=== Mathematics ===
- Adjoint representation of a Lie group, abbreviated "Ad" in mathematics
- Axiom of determinacy, a set theory axiom

=== Physics ===
- Antiproton Decelerator, a device at the CERN physics laboratory
- Autodynamics, a physics theory

=== Other uses in science and technology ===
- Active disassembly, a technology supporting the cost-effective deconstruction of complex materials

== Other uses ==
- ʿĀd, an ancient Arab tribe, mentioned in the Quran
- Anno Diocletiani, an alternative year numbering system
- United States Academic Decathlon, an annual high school competition series of 10 events testing students on various subjects
- Athletic director, an administrator of a sports department of an American educational institution

== See also ==
- AAD (disambiguation)
- ADD (disambiguation)
- Anno Domini (disambiguation)
- BC (disambiguation)
- Domino (disambiguation)
