= Ad (name) =

Ad is a first name. It is common in the Netherlands, where it is almost always short for Adrianus or Adriaan. In America it can be short for Adolph, Adam, Addison, and others. People with the first name of Ad include:

- Ad Achkar (born 1988), Lebanese photographer and artist
- Ad van der Avoird (born 1943), Dutch chemist
- Ad Bax (born 1956), Dutch-American biophysicist
- Ad de Boer (born 1946), Dutch politician
- Ad Brennan (1887–1962), American baseball pitcher
- Ad Carter (1895–1957), American cartoonist (Ad stands for "August Daniel")
- Ad Dekkers (1938–1974), Dutch artist
- Ad Dekkers (1953–2002), Dutch cyclist
- Ad Donker (1933–2002), Dutch-South African publisher
- Ad Geelhoed (1942–2007), Dutch professor, civil service worker, and Advocate-General
- Ad Gumbert (1868–1925), American baseball pitcher
- Ad Hermes (1929–2002), Dutch politician
- Ad Kaland (1922–1995), Dutch politician
- Ad Abi Karam (born 1937), Lebanese-Australian Catholic bishop
- Ad van Kempen (1944–2026), Dutch actor
- Ad Kolnaar (born 1942), Dutch economist
- Ad Konings (born 1956), Dutch ichthyologist
- Ad Koppejan (born 1962), Dutch politician
- Ad Lagendijk (born 1947), Dutch physicist
- Ad Lankford (1882–1967), American baseball pitcher
- Ad van Liempt (born 1949), Dutch journalist
- Ad Liska (1906–1998), American baseball pitcher
- Ad van Luyn (born 1935), Dutch Roman Catholic bishop
- Ad Melkert (born 1956), Dutch politician
- Ad Minoliti (born 1980), Argentinian visual artist
- Ad Moolhuijzen (born 1943), Dutch water polo player
- Ad Neeleman (born 1964), Dutch-British linguist
- Ad Reinhardt (1913–1967), American abstract painter
- Ad Rutschman (born 1931), American football and baseball coach
- Ad Santel (1887–1966), American professional wrestler
- Ad Simonis (1931–2020), Dutch Roman Catholic cardinal
- Ad Sluijter (born 1981), Dutch guitarist
- Ad Snijders (1929–2010), Dutch painter
- Ad van der Steur (1893–1953), Dutch architect
- Ad Stouthamer (1931–2023), Dutch microbiologist
- Ad Strengholt (1901-1973), Dutch publisher
- Ad Swigler (1895–1975), American baseball pitcher
- Ad Tak (born 1953), Dutch bicycle racer
- Ad van Tiggelen (born 1958), Dutch banker and fantasy writer
- Ad Vandenberg (born 1954), Dutch rock guitarist
- Ad Visser (born 1947), Dutch VJ, presenter, writer, and music artist
- Ad Wammes (born 1953), Dutch composer
- Ad Wenke (1898–1961), American football player and justice
- Ad Wijnands (born 1959), Dutch bicycle racer
- Ad Wolgast (1888–1955), American boxer
- Ad Wouters (born 1944), Dutch-Belgian sculptor
- Ad Yale (1870–1948), American baseball player
- Ad Zonderland (1940–2007), Dutch football manager and administrator
