= Adrianus (given name) =

Adrianus is a Latin form of the name Adrian. It is popular in the Low Countries, where Latinized christian names or baptismal name were common from the 15th century until recently, especially after the papacy in 1522–23 of homegrown Adrianus VI, who had been baptized "Adrianus" in 1459, as this event fell on the name day of Saint Adrian. People with the given name Adrianus generally use a short form in daily life, like Aad, Ad, Adri, Adriaan, Adrian, Adrie, Ard, Ariaan, Arian, Arie, Ariën, Aris, Arjan, Arjen, or Janus.

Adrianus may also refer to:

== Before 1500 ==
- Adrianus (113–193), sophist of ancient Athens.
- Adrianus (poet), Greek poet who wrote an epic poem on the history of Alexander the Great
- Saint Adrianus (died 306), Roman officer and Christian martyr
- Adrianus Africanus (died 710), Abbot of St Augustine's Abbey in Canterbury
- Adrianus I (died 795), pope from 772 to 795
- Adrianus II (792–872), pope from 867 to 872
- Adrianus III (died 885), pope from 884 to 885
- Adrianus Comnenus (fl. 1100), Byzantine aristocrat and general
- Adrianus IV (c.1100–1159), pope from 1154 to 1159
- Adrianus V (c.1215–1276), pope in 1276
- Adrianus VI (1459–1523), pope from 1522 to 1523
- Adrianus Barlandus (1486–1538), Dutch historian
- Adrianus Petit Coclico (1499–1562), Netherlandish Renaissance composer

== Academics, science and technology ==
- Adrianus G. "Adriaan" Camper (1759–1820), Dutch mathematician, politician and paleontologist
- Adrianus D. "Adriaan" de Groot (1914–2006), Dutch psychologist and chess player
- Adrianus "Adriaan" Heereboord (1613–1661), Dutch philosopher and logician
- Adrianus "Aad" de Hoop (born 1927), Dutch electrical engineer
- Adrianus H.J. "Ad" Kolnaar (born 1942), Dutch economist
- Adrianus F.J.M.M. "Ad" Konings (born 1956), Dutch ichthyologist
- Adrianus Metius (1571–1635), Dutch geometer and astronomer
- Adrianus "Aad" Nuis (1933–2007), Dutch political scientist
- Adrianus Relandus (1676–1718), Dutch scholar, cartographer and philologist
- Adrianus Romanus (1561–1615), Flemish mathematician
- Adrianus "Adriaan" van Royen (1704–1779), Dutch botanist
- Adrianus Saravia (1532–1612), Flemish theologian active in England
- Adrianus Spigelius (1578–1625), Flemish anatomist
- Adrianus Turnebus (1512–1565), French classical scholar

== Arts and letters ==
- Adrianus Bleijs (1842–1912), Dutch architect
- Adrianus Johannes Ehnle (1819–1863), Dutch painter
- Adrianus Eversen (1818–1897), Dutch painter
- de:Adrianus Michiel de Jong (1888–1943), Dutch author
- Adrianus Marinus Kyvon (born 1947), Dutch comedian and actor
- nl:Adrianus Cornelis van Leeuwen (1887–1991), Dutch composer
- Adrianus "Adriaan" Roland Holst (1888–1976), Dutch writer and poet
- Adrianus W. "Arie" Smit (1916–2016), Dutch-born Indonesian painter
- Adrianus Valerius (c. 1575–1625), Dutch poet and composer
- Adrianus Jacobus Zuijderland (1810–1897), Dutch model for Vincent van Gogh
- Adrianus Zwart (1903–1981), Dutch painter

== Law, politics and religion ==
- de:Adrianus Cornelis de Bruijn (1887–1968), Dutch government minister
- Adrianus Djajasepoetra (1894–1979), Indonesian Roman Catholic archbishop
- Adrianus J. "Ad" Hermes (1929–2002), Dutch politician
- Adrianus van Kleffens (1899–1973), Dutch judge
- Adrianus Antonie Henri Willem König (1867–1944), Dutch government minister
- Adrianus H. "Ad" van Luyn (born 1935), Dutch Roman Catholic bishop
- Adrianus P. W. "Ad" Melkert (born 1956), Dutch politician
- fr:Adrianus Poirters (1605–1674), Flemish Jesuit and writer
- Adrianus Johannes Simonis (1931–2020), Dutch Cardinal of the Catholic Church

== Sports ==
- Adrianus "Arie" Bieshaar (1899–1965), Dutch footballer
- Adrianus "Janus" Braspennincx (1903–1977), Dutch cyclist
- Adrianus "Ad" Dekkers (1953–2002), Dutch cyclist
- Adrianus F. Th. van der Heijden (born 1951), Dutch writer
- Adrianus "Arie" de Jong (1882–1966), Dutch fencer
- Adrianus "Adrie" Koster (born 1954), Dutch football player and coach
- Adrianus A.C. "Adrie" van Kraay (born 1953), Dutch footballer
- Adrianus "Janus" van Merrienboer (1894–1947), Dutch archer
- Adrianus "Aad" van Mil (born 1957), Dutch water polo player
- Adrianus "Ard" Schenk (born 1944), Dutch speedskater
- Adrianus C. "Janus" Theeuwes (1886–1975), Dutch archer
- Adrianus "Adri" van Tiggelen (born 1957), Dutch footballer
- Adrianus P. "André" van Troost (born 1972), Dutch cricketer
- Adrianus "Adri" Voorting (1931–1961), Dutch cyclist
- Adrianus "Arjan" de Zeeuw (born 1970), Dutch footballer
