= Finch (Dutch band) =

Dutch progressive rock group

- Origin: Rotterdam and The Hague, Netherlands
- Genres: Progressive rock
- Years active: 1974–1978
- Labels: Atlantic Records; Negram; Bubble; Rockburgh
- Past members: Joop van Nimwegen; Peter Vink; Beer Klaasse; Paul Vink; Cleem Determeijer; Ad Wammes; Hans Bosboom; Fred van Vloten

Finch (1974–1978) was a Dutch progressive rock group that continued to be known internationally years after their final concert on 14 November 1978 at the World Forum Convention Center in The Hague.

== History ==
Finch was established by bass player Peter Vink (Vink meaning finch in Dutch) and drummer Beer Klaasse. Guitarist and composer Joop van Nimwegen, who had worked with Vink in the Dutch formation Q65, soon joined. For lack of a good singer, Finch decided to build a repertoire of instrumental rock. Keyboardist Paul Vink joined, but was soon replaced by Cleem Determeijer, then a student at the Rotterdam Academy of Music.

The first album, Glory of the Inner Force, was published in Finch's native Netherlands, as well as by ATCO/Atlantic in the United States. On both sides of the ocean the album received positive reviews.

The second album, Beyond Expression, became a Record of the Week on Radio Veronica, a popular Dutch seaborn station. Finch started to make a name for itself and began to attract crowds to their concerts in the Netherlands, Belgium, and Germany. Determeijer wanted to concentrate on his piano studies and was replaced by Ad Wammes. Beer Klaasse was replaced by Hans Bosboom, as Klaasse was busy with his own business in leather goods.

A third album, Galleons of Passion was published in the Netherlands and the UK, after which Hans Bosboom left, citing personal circumstances, and was replaced by Fred van Vloten. The frequent personal changes in the rock group made it impossible to continue. In 1978 the partnership was discontinued when Joop van Nimwegen decided to quit. A posthumous live album, called The Making of Galleons of Passion / Stage '76, containing demos, unreleased takes, and live material was released in 1999. Finch's albums continue to attract the interest of those who enjoy early classic and progressive rock.

Joop van Nimwegen has played in the pit orchestra of many Dutch stage musicals over the years. In 2012 Ad Wammes recreated his old pre-Finch band Montoya with Henk Hager (ex-Diesel) as vocalist / bass player. Fred van Vloten died in 2008.

== Discography ==
=== Albums ===
- Glory of the Inner Force (1975), Negram (Netherlands) + ATCO/Atlantic (USA)
- Beyond Expression (1976), Negram (Netherlands)
- Galleons of Passion (1977), Bubble (Netherlands) + Rockburgh (UK)
- The Making of... Galleons of Passion / Stage '76 (1999), Pseudonym Records (Netherlands)

=== Singles ===
- "Colossus" (1975), Negram (Netherlands)

=== Compilations ===
- "Mythology" (2013), Pseudonym (Netherlands) - Glory of the Inner Force / Colossus / Beyond Expression / Galleons of Passion / The Making of... Galleons of Passion + live tracks
