= SNJ =

SNJ may refer to:

- Stroud News & Journal, an English newspaper
- The LRT station abbreviation for Senja LRT station, Bukit Panjang, Singapore
- The US Navy designation for the North American T-6 Texan training aircraft
- The ICAO code for Skynet Asia Airways
- Sango language, ISO 639-3 code
- Switching noise jitter
- Syndicat national des journalistes
