= Adri =

Adri is a given name and nickname which may refer to:

- Adri (Adrienne Steckling-Coen) (1934–2006), American fashion designer
- Adrià Adri Arnaus (born 1994), Spanish golfer
- Adrián Adri Castellano (born 1994), Spanish footballer
- Adrián Adri Cuevas (born 1990), Spanish footballer
- Adriaan Adri Dees (1942–2021), Dutch politician
- Adri Duycker (born 1946), Dutch retired cyclist
- Adrián Adri Embarba (born 1992), Spanish footballer
- Adrianus Adri van Es (1913–1994), Dutch vice admiral
- Adrian Adri Geldenhuys (born 1964), South African former rugby union player
- Adrián Adri Gómez (born 1994), Spanish footballer
- Adri van Heteren (born 1951), Dutch Christian Reformed Churches minister and politician
- Adriaan Adri van Houwelingen (born 1953), Dutch retired road bicycle racer
- Adrianus Adri van Male (1910–1990), Dutch football goalkeeper
- Adrián Adri Montoro (born 1995), Spanish footballer
- Adriana Adri Bleuland van Oordt (1862–1944), Dutch artist and draftswoman
- Adrián Adri Pavón (born 1989), Spanish footballer
- Adrie Adri van der Poel (born 1959), Dutch retired cyclist
- Adrián Adri Rodrígues (born 1988), Andorran footballer
- Adrián Adri Ruiz (born 1988), Spanish footballer
- Adri Schoeman (born 1970), South African retired sprinter
- Adrianus Adri van Tiggelen (born 1957), Dutch retired footballer
- Adri van Westerop (1957–2009), Luxembourg politician, author and scientist
- Adri van der Merwe (born 2002), Namibian cricketer

Wan Muhammad Adri Bin Wan Mohd Huzairi (2012-now) , Malaysian calisthenics athlete
