= AAD =

AAD or aad may refer to:

== Organizations ==
- Ad Altare Dei, a Boy Scouts of America award
- Advanced Automotive Design, a former South African car manufacturer
- AAD Education, Health and Sports (formerly, Athletes Against Drugs), an organization founded by Stedman Graham
- American Academy of Dermatology, a professional organization
- Australian Antarctic Division, a division of the Department of Climate Change, Energy, the Environment & Water

== Science and technology ==
=== Computing ===
- Additional authenticated data, passed to an authenticated encryption with associated data (AEAD) block cipher mode of operation
- ASCII Adjust before Division (aad), one of the Intel BCD opcodes
- Microsoft Azure Active Directory, former name of a cloud-based identity and access management solution

=== Medicine and biology ===
- Acute aortic dissection, a type of aortic dissection
- Antiarrhythmic drug, a class of drugs
- Antibiotic-associated diarrhea, caused by antibiotics
- 7-Aminoactinomycin D (7-AAD), a fluorescent stain for DNA
- Arbitrarily amplified DNA (AAD), a family of DNA profiling methods

=== Other science and technology ===
- Advanced Air defence, an anti-ballistic missile in the Indian Ballistic Missile Defence Programme
- Average absolute deviation, a measure of absolute deviation and a way to report error against reference data in statistics
- Automatic activation device, a fail-safe device often used in a parachute pack
- Recorded analog, mixed analog, and transferred digitally (SPARS code: AAD), of a compact disk

== Other uses ==
- Aad, a given name
- Adado Airport (IATA airport code AAD), in Galmudug, Somalia
- Africa Aerospace and Defence Expo, a biennial trade show in South Africa
- Amal language (ISO 639-3: aad), a language of Papua New Guinea
- Attitude-toward-the-ad models, a way of measuring the success of an advertisement

== See also ==
- AD (disambiguation)
- 'Ad (disambiguation)
