= Wammes =

Wammes is a surname. Notable people with the surname include:

- Ad Wammes (born 1953), Dutch composer
- Jeffrey Wammes (born 1987), Dutch gymnast
- Nick Wammes (born 1999), Canadian track cyclist
