= Aad =

Aad is a Dutch short version of the given name Adrianus/Adriaan. It is also a less common Norwegian given name.

== People with the given name ==
- Aad Andriessen (1960–2021), Dutch footballer
- Aad Bak (1926–2009), Dutch footballer
- Aad de Koning (1928–2010), Dutch speed skater
- Aad de Bruyn (1910–1991), Dutch throwing athlete
- Aad de Graaf (1939–1995), Dutch track cyclist
- Aad Knutsson Gjelle (1768–1840), Norwegian cartographer
- Aad de Hoop (born 1927), Dutch physicist and mathematician
- Aad Jacobs (born 1936), Dutch businessman
- Aad de Jong (1921–2003), Dutch footballer
- Aad Kosto (born 1938), Dutch politician
- Aad Mansveld (1944–1991), Dutch footballer
- Aad de Mos (born 1947), Dutch football coach
- Aad Nuis (1933–2007), Dutch political scientist
- Aad Oudt (born 1946), Dutch swimmer
- Aad Steylen (born 1935), Dutch long-distance runner
- Aad van Toor (born 1942), Dutch circus performer
- Aad van Wijngaarden (1916–1987), Dutch mathematician
- Aad van den Hoek (born 1951), Dutch cyclist
- Aad van der Vaart (born 1959), Dutch mathematician
- Aad J. Vinje (1857–1929), Norwegian-born American justice
- Aad Wagenaar (born 1940), Dutch politician
- Aad Zaanen (1913–2000), Dutch mathematician

== See also ==
- ‘Ad, also Aad, great-grandson of Shem, son of Noah
- ʿĀd, also Aad, ancient Arab tribe, mentioned in Quran
