= Anno Domini (disambiguation) =

Anno Domini designates years since the traditional date of the birth of Jesus Christ.

Anno Domini may also refer to:

- Anno Domini High Definition, a 2009 album by Polish band Riverside
- Anno Domini (Mobile Suit Gundam 00), a timeline used in anime television series
- Anno Domini (band), an Australian symphonic black/death metal band
- Anno Domini 2000, or, Woman's Destiny, an 1889 science fiction novel by Julius Vogel
- Anno Domini MCMXXI, a poetry collection by Anna Akhmatova, published in 1921
- Anno Domini 1989–1995, a box set released by Black Sabbath in 2024.
- Anno Domini, 1988 debut album of the Hungarian black metal band Tormentor
