= Cagniard–De Hoop method =

Mathematical technique in seismology

In the mathematical modeling of seismic waves, the Cagniard–De Hoop method is a sophisticated mathematical tool for solving a large class of wave and diffusive problems in horizontally layered media. The method is based on the combination of a unilateral Laplace transformation with the real-valued and positive transform parameter and the slowness field representation. It is named after Louis Cagniard and Adrianus de Hoop; Cagniard published his method in 1939, and De Hoop published an ingenious improvement on it in 1960.

Initially, the Cagniard–De Hoop technique was of interest to the seismology community only. Thanks to its versatility, however, the technique has become popular in other disciplines and is nowadays widely accepted as the benchmark for the computation of wavefields in layered media. In its applications to calculating wavefields in general N-layered stratified media, the Cagniard–De Hoop technique is also known as the generalized ray theory. The complete generalized-ray theory, including the pertaining wave-matrix formalism for the layered medium with arbitrary point sources, has been developed by De Hoop (with his students) for acoustics waves, elastic waves and electromagnetic waves.

Early applications of the Cagniard-DeHoop technique were limited to the wavefield propagation in piecewise homogeneous, loss-free layered media. To circumvent the limitations, a number of extensions enabling the incorporation of arbitrary dissipation and loss mechanisms and continuously-layered media were introduced. More recently, the Cagniard–De Hoop technique has been employed to put forward a fundamentally new time-domain integral-equation technique in computational electromagnetics, the so-called Cagniard–De Hoop Method of Moments (CdH-MoM), for time-domain modeling of pulsed electromagnetic wave interactions with wire and planar antennas, slots, apertures and metasurfaces.
