= Ad Neeleman =

Dutch linguist based in the UK (born 1964)

Adriaan Dirk Neeleman (born 7 November 1964, Rotterdam) is a Dutch linguist based in the UK. He has been a Professor of Linguistics at University College London since 1997. Neelman's focus is theoretical syntax.

== Education ==
Neeleman received his undergraduate degree from Konigin Wilhelmina College in 1984, before going on to pursue his Master's at the University of Utrecht. Neeleman completed his PhD at the University of Utrecht in 1994, where he earned a Study Prize from the Foundation Praemium Erasmianum. In 1997, Neeleman began to work at University College London.

== Research ==
His research focuses on syntax, particularly on the interfaces between syntax and semantics and phonology. His work is part of the tradition of generative grammar.

Neeleman is co-author of the monographs Flexible Syntax: A Theory of Case and Arguments (1998; with Fred Weerman) and Beyond Morphology (2004; with Peter Ackema). He also wrote the textbook Features of Person with Peter Ackema, published by MIT Press.

Neeleman has long argued against an Antisymmetry and Linear Correspondence Axiom centred account of syntactic linearisation. Instead, along with Klaus Abels, he has argued for an account that views asymmetries in the syntax as arising in the interface with the phonological form, and thus, orders that are not attested are such due to causing parsing difficulties.

Neeleman was president of the Linguistics Association of Great Britain.
