= Adrianus de Hoop =

Dutch electrical engineer (born 1927)

Adrianus T. de Hoop
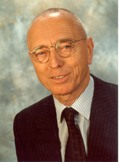
- Born: 24 December 1927 (age 98); Rotterdam, Netherlands
- Education: Delft University of Technology
- Known for: Cagniard-de Hoop method
- Awards: IEEE Heinrich Hertz Medal (2001)
- Scientific career
- Fields: Electrical engineering; Acoustics
- Workplaces: Delft University of Technology
- Thesis: Representation theorems for the displacement in an elastic solid and their application to elastodynamic diffraction theory (1958)
- Website: www.atdehoop.com

Adrianus Teunis "Aad" de Hoop (born 24 December 1927) is a Dutch electrical engineer, mathematician, and physicist, and professor emeritus at Delft University of Technology. De Hoop's research interests are in the broad area of wavefield modeling in acoustics, electromagnetics, and elastodynamics. Other research includes a method for computing pulsed electromagnetic fields in strongly heterogeneous media with applications to integrated circuits, and a methodology for time-domain pulsed-field antenna analysis, design, and optimization for mobile communication and radar applications.

== Early life and education ==
De Hoop was born in Rotterdam, Netherlands in 1927. He received his MSc in electrical engineering in 1950 and his PhD in technological sciences in 1958, both cum laude from Delft University of Technology. He is the namesake of the Cagniard-de Hoop method, a modification of the Cagniard method.

== Career ==
De Hoop worked as an assistant professor (1950–1957), associate professor (1957–1960), full professor (1960–1996), and Lorentz Chair emeritus professor (1996–present) for Delft University of Technology, his alma mater. He taught electromagnetic theory, applied mathematics, electrical engineering, mathematics, and computer science. In 1970, he founded the Laboratory of Elecromagnetic Research at Delft; this has since developed into a world-class center for electromagnetics. He spent a year in 1956 as a research assistant at University of California's Institute of Geophysics in Los Angeles in the United States. During his time there, he created a modification of the Cagniard method for calculating impulsive wave propagation in layered media. This modification was later called the Cagniard-de Hoop method and is now considered a benchmark tool in analyzing time-domain wave propagation. He spent a year-long sabbatical at the Philips Natuurkundig Laboratorium in Eindhoven working on magnetic recording theory. Among his PhD students was Jacob Fokkema, later rector at Delft 2002–2010.

Since 1982, De Hoop has been a regular visiting scientist at the Schlumberger-Doll Research Center, formerly located in Ridgefield, Connecticut and now in Cambridge, Massachusetts in the United States. Here, he contributes to research on geophysical applications of acoustic, electromagnetic, and elastodynamic waves. Grants from the Stichting Fund for Science, Technology and Research, founded by Schlumberger, supported his research in Delft.

In 1995, he published the Handbook of Radiation and Scattering of Waves.

== Honours ==
- 1981: Honorary doctorate in applied sciences - University of Ghent
- 1989: Research Medal - Royal Institute of Engineers, Netherlands
- 1989: Membership - Royal Netherlands Academy of Arts and Sciences
- 2001: Heinrich Hertz Medal - Institute of Electrical and Electronics Engineers
- 2002: Balthasar van der Pol Gold Research Medal - International Scientific Radio Union
- 2003: Knighthood - Order of the Netherlands Lion
- 2008: Honorary doctorate in mathematical, physical, and engineering sciences - Växjö University
- Foreign member - Royal Flemish Academy of Belgium for Science and the Arts

== Personal life ==
He performs choral music with the Rotterdam Philharmonic Choir and plays piano in his spare time. Prior to suffering a cerebral infarction in 2012 that left him paralyzed on the left side of his body, he cycled daily from his home in Bergschenhoek, where he lives with wife Annelies, to Delft.
