= AD (poem) =

Poem by Kenneth Fearing

AD is a poem by the American poet Kenneth Fearing, written in 1938 and published in 1956 in New and Collected Poems by the Indiana University Press. It is written in the form of a job advertisement. In it, Fearing satirizes the autonomy of killing in the European theatre of World War II. He uses verbal irony to mock how "casually and mindlessly people are prepared to accept the horrors of war".

== Synopsis and structure ==
The poem, being in the form of a job description, attempts to recruit men into a "new, tremendous". field. Fearing then asks the reader if they have experienced a series of detailed gruesome acts, such as having "heavenly visions of people, by the thousands, dying in flames". This digression of imagery is broken off by an invitation to apply for the position. The subject is dehumanized further by requiring a new race of men to fight who possess no skill, ambition, intelligence, or character. The poem closes with a final promotion and stating "Wages: Death"

The job advertisement structuring of the poem lends itself to a further emotional detachment from the act of killing. The speakerless listing of "AD", such as in lines 9 and 10, "Wanted: A race of brand-new men. / Apply: Middle Europe". This trait conveys that there are simply roles to fill in order to achieve the objective of mass murder. While being a soldier is a respectable profession, it does not necessarily have to come with the same apathy to tragedy that is displayed in the poem. Using a break from italics and an ending em dash, lines 4–6 act as an aside from the rest of the work. The lines preceding and following this remain in the rigid listing format of an advertisement, while the aside itself escapes the bulleted staccato rhythm by detailing several barbaric deeds that a person interested in the ad might have done. This section abruptly segues back into the primary pattern as if to snap the reader’s attention back to the purpose of the ad. The sudden transition is exaggerated by the em dash ending the aside: "If you thrill at the thought of throwing poison into wells, have heavenly visions of people, by the thousands, dying in flames— / You are the very man we want". In this, the poem emphasizes a description of the repulsive kind of person who would enjoy war, contrasting it with the dryness and emotional dissociation of an advertisement.

== Context and purpose ==
Although World War II was Fearing’s primary motivation to write "AD", it was not the only incentive. Fearing was an avid proletarian writer and was heavily influenced by communist ideologies. His poetry regularly described "the feelings of a normally mute and ignored underclass". He also wrote in common language which anyone can understand. Therefore, Fearing saw a world war as poor men fighting a rich man’s battle and used his poetry to convince the working class to reject the political and social concepts surrounding the war. In "AD" he uses understatement to emphasize the atrocities of a war that should not concern those fighting it. By characterizing someone who would enjoy war as psychopathic, he repels the reader from warfare. The primary purpose is to draw attention to the insanities of war and to disrupt nations’ hailing of soldiers.

== Analysis ==
Fearing utilizes language, structure, imagery, and overall tone to completely dehumanize the act of killing another human. His candid language in "AD" not only reaches out to a wider audience, but also dramatizes the inhumanity in WWII. The first line of the poem, "Wanted: Men", may as well say "Wanted: Bodies". Personalities and ambitions are not wanted in soldiers, as Fearing explains. The advertisement only calls for brainless men to pull triggers, with no extra intuition. The reader is simply characterized as a part of the business of war as well as of a new race of men.

The rapidity of the disconnected statements in the poem also lends itself to brutal nature of the Second World War. Each line is essentially a bulleted point, providing little sense of stability or linearity. The primary element each line shares is the goal to dehumanize the human puppets of war. This separation of statements also contributes to a further dissociation of empathy and emotional desensitization to the subject matter.

Men that thrive in war are described by Fearing as "figure[s] in a chamber of horrors" and psychiatric ward escapees. He continues, indicating that they are a new race of men who are wanted in Middle Europe. This incites imagery in the reader of a fantastical subhuman race akin to the orcs in Tolkien’s The Lord of the Rings. Fearing uses this implicit comparison to further barbarize war. Finally, the reader is informed of what they will gain if they choose to accept the much demanded job. The only thing an applicant gains in this position is a wage of death. Fearing implies that they are worthless if they are not alive and fighting; otherwise, they may as well be dead. When they are paid their wage of death, another man is simply needed to fill their place.
