= Ad van Tiggelen =

Dutch fantasy author (born 1958)

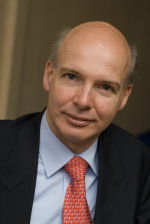
- Born: 7 June 1958 (age 68); Maastricht, Netherlands
- Occupations: Investment strategist, Novelist
- Writing career
- Pen name: Adrian Stone
- Genres: Fantasy, Investment columnist
- Website: www.adrianstone.nl

Ad van Tiggelen (born 7 June 1958) is a Dutch author of fantasy novels using the pen name Adrian Stone.

== Career ==
Van Tiggelen studied business economics at the Erasmus University Rotterdam and in 1981 started his career at Nationale-Nederlanden, where he became investment manager in 1988. Since then he moved through a series of investment jobs at ING Groep, including a long period as head of European equities. In the end, he worked as investment strategist, in which he regularly appeared in national and international media to comment on developments in the financial markets and to express and explain the vision of ING Investment Management. He ended his career with ING on 30 June 2014.

== Columns ==
Van Tiggelen wrote columns every month about a series of investment topics. These columns appeared in the Netherlands in FD.nl and in various financial media in other countries: Belgium, France, Spain, Italy, Germany, Greece and Poland.

== Author ==
Since his youth Van Tiggelen had a passion for fantasy literature, which led him to write fantasy novels himself. In 2006 his first book Devil's Prophet appeared in a limited edition at Gopher publishers. In 2008 he signed a contract with Luitingh-Sijthoff, the Netherlands' largest publisher of speculative fiction and fantasy, on which basis Luitingh-Sijthoff re-published Devil's Prophet in April 2009, followed in June 2009 by Devil's Son. The third part of the Devil's Soul trilogy, appeared in April 2010. All books are published under the pseudonym Adrian Stone.

After the Devil Trilogy Stone wrote the Rune Duology, which is situated in the same world. The first part The Eighth Rune was published in September 2011, the second part The First God in September 2012.

After Rune, Stone wrote a new series (title: Magycker), which plays in a completely new world. The first part The Claw was published in 2016. The second and final part Dragon Heart was published on 26 October 2021.

In April 2023 a hardcover edition of the Devil Trilogy was published, followed by hardcover editions of Rune (2024) and Magycker (2025).

In September 2026 the stand-alone novel The labyrint is published.

Adrian Stone is the Netherlands' best-selling fantasy author.

== Bibliography Adrian Stone ==
- Devil trilogy
  - Devil's Prophet (Profeet van de Duivel) (ISBN 9024529468, 2009)
  - Devil's Son (Zoon van de Duivel) (ISBN 9024529476, 2009)
  - Devil's Soul (Ziel van de Duivel) (ISBN 9024531195, 2010)
- Rune duology
  - The Eighth Rune (De Achtste Rune) (ISBN 902453562X, 2011)
  - The First God (De Eerste God) (ISBN 902455120X, 2012)
- Devil trilogy omnibus (ISBN 9024562503, 2013)
- Rune omnibus (ISBN 9021015625, 2014)
- Magycker series
  - The Claw (De Klauw) (ISBN 9024568366, 2016)
  - Dragon Heart (Drakenhart) (ISBN 9024575273, 2021)
- Devil trilogy hardcover (ISBN 9021036649, 2023)
- Rune duology hardcover (ISBN 9021044609, 2024)
- Magycker hardcover (ISBN 9021053829, 2025)
- The labyrint (ISBN 9789021063423, 2026)
