= Ad Minoliti =

Argentinian artist (born 1980)

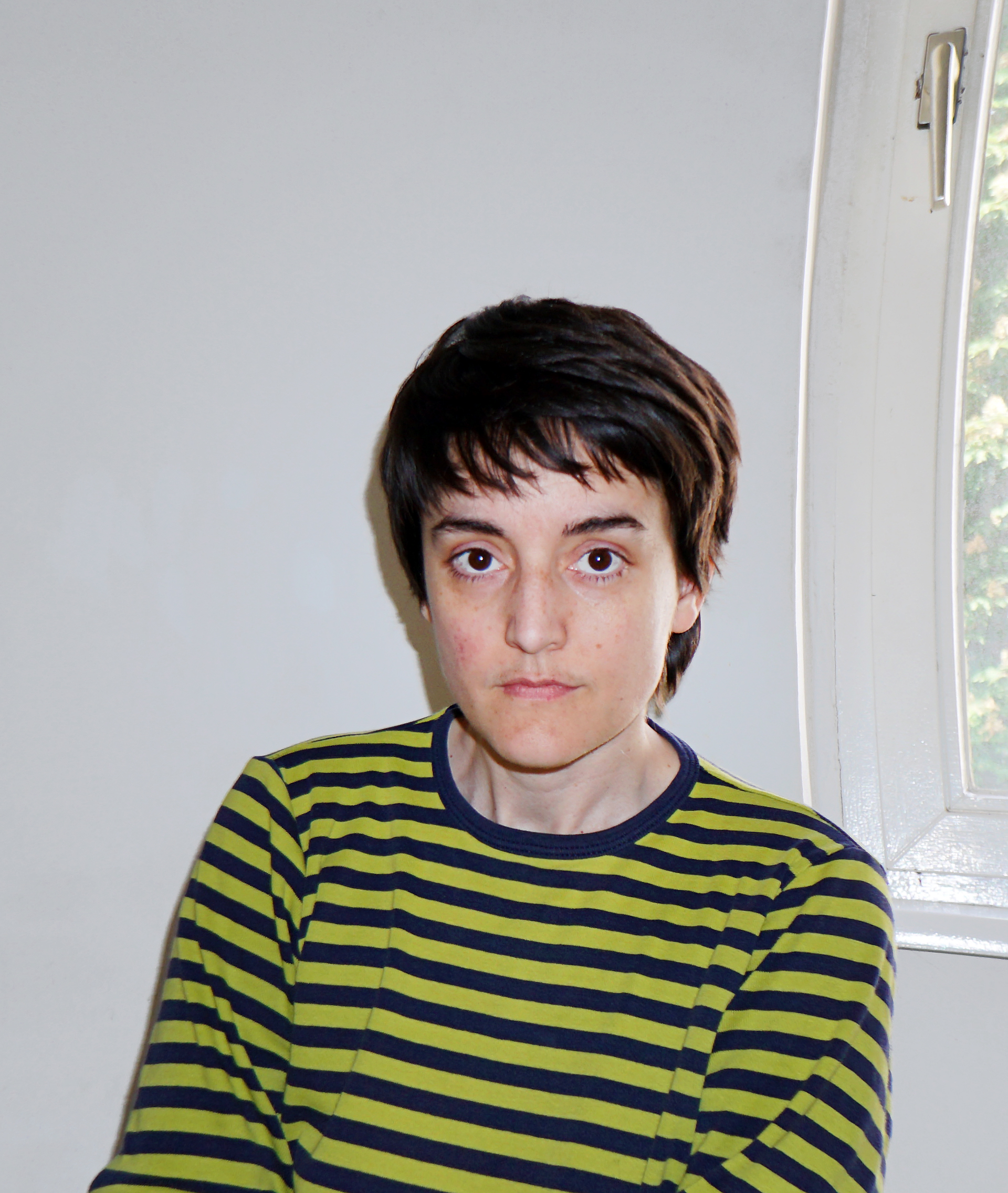
- Born: 1980; Buenos Aires, Argentina
- Known for: Installation art, Painting
- Awards: National Painting Award from the Central Bank of the Republic of Argentina

Ad Minoliti (born in 1980, Buenos Aires, Argentina) is an Argentinian-born visual artist primarily working as painter with an expansive practice on installations, soft sculptures, textiles, and convivial spaces. Minoliti's work is based on their readings of feminist and queer theories and the Latin American legacy of abstraction art. They have been presenting solo exhibitions in South America as well as in major art institutions in Asia, the United States, and Europe.

== Early life and education ==
Ad Minoliti was born in 1980 in Buenos Aires, Argentina, where the artist still lives and works. Minoliti is the offspring of mother Cecilia Minoliti. They identify as non-binary.

The artist was originally trained in painting at the National School of Fine Arts Prilidiano Pueyrredon (2009) in Buenos Aires, before attending the Artistic Research Center of Buenos Aires (Centro de Investigaciones Artísticas) in 2011. They founded the group PintorAs (painters), a feminist collective of young Argentinian painters.

== Career and artistic practice ==
Minoliti's work investigates 20th-century Latin America’s modern art traditions in abstraction derived from Western art historical trends, particularly Geometric Abstraction. Working primarily as a painter, they also produce digital collage, GIFs, animation, sculpture, murals, installation, and participative environments to comment on issues of architecture, space, modernity, identity, and normativity.

Their bright color paintings and spaces touch on themes of queerness, science fiction, and binary identity in relation to modernism, gender roles, children's play, and the natural world, particularly mushrooms. The Grupo Madí and the Asociación Arte Concreto-Invención (AACI) in Argentina has greatly impacted Ad Minoliti's artistic practice. According to the artist, they aim to expand society's binary modes of operation via image-making and the creation of new cultural patterns.

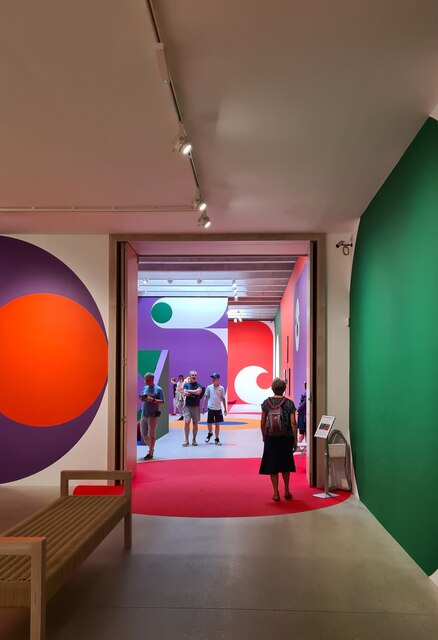
Entrance to the Ad Minoliti exhibition in the Tate St Ives

Ad Minoliti represented Argentina at the 58th Venice Biennale in 2019. Their project took inspiration on the social structures of 17th-century dollhouses and their modern impact on girls and gender expectations to comment on modernist art traditions and 20th-century artists such as Kandinsky, Picasso, and Matisse.

The artist was awarded with the Art Explora – Cité internationale des arts residency program in Spring 2023, in France. Among Minoliti's artistic and theoretical references, they have cited cultural critics and scholars such as Paul B. Preciado and Silvia Federici, Donna Haraway, Linda Nochlin, and Brian O'Doherty's Inside the White Cube.

In 2023, the French publishing house Les presses du reel released Ad Minoliti's a trilingual edition of the artist's first monograph following their investigation of white cubes and whimsical spaces through the solo shows Biosfera Peluche/Biosphere Plush at Tate St Ives, and Play Theater at Centre de Création Contemporaine Olivier Debré, Tours, both between 2021 and 2022.

== Exhibitions ==
Minoliti's work has been presented in museum exhibitions across the Americas, Europe, and Asia. In 2024, they are presenting the two-person show Manifesto of Immature Abstraction alongside artist Catalina Schliebener Muñoz at Barro Gallery, in New York.

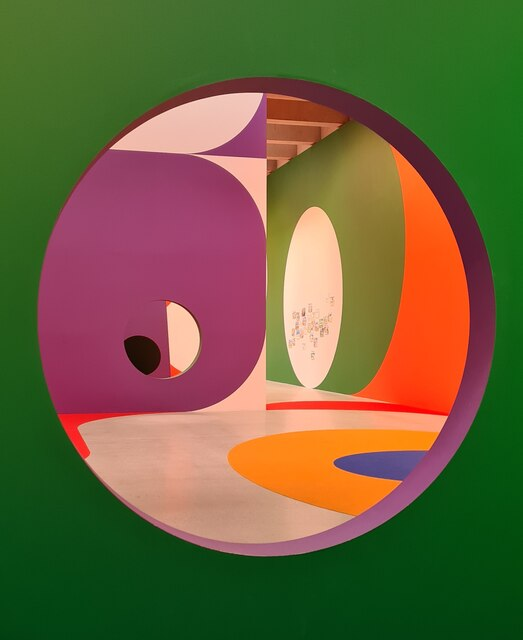
A view of the Ad Minoliti exhibition in the Tate St Ives

Major solo presentations of their work in the past years include Biosfera Peluche / Biosphere Plush (2022) at Tate St Ives and Baltic Centre for Contemporary Art, England; Nave Vermelhe (2020) Kunsthalle Lissabon, Lisbon; the 58th Venice Biennale: May You Live in Interesting Times (2019) Venice; Soft Museum (2019) Museo Moderno, Buenos Aires; Drag King Mural (2019) MCA Chicago; Fantasías Modulares (2018) was shown at Mass MoCA, North Adams; The Feminist School of Painting (2018) at Kadist, San Francisco; and Symposium for expanded painting and speculative fiction (2018) at Casa Victoria OCampo, Buenos Aires.

Their work was featured at the 2018 FRONT International Cleveland Triennial for Contemporary Art, in Ohio.

In regards to one-person showings at private galleries, their works were on view at Play Mode at Gallery Meyer*Kainer, Vienna (2023); Geometries of the Forest (2023) at Peres Project, Seoul; warm hole & hot tea (2022) at Galerie Crèvecoeur, Paris; and Playground 2.0 CDMX (2018) at Galería Agustina Ferreyra, Mexico City, among others.

=== The Feminist School of Painting ===
Minoliti's social practice and site-specific project The Feminist School of Painting has been commissioned and installed in international art events and prominent museums around the world in venues such as the 13th Gwangju Biennale, South Korea, the Tate St Ives, United Kingdom; and Kadist, San Francisco, California, Pinacoteca do Estado de Sao Paulo, Brazil, among others.

== Collections ==
- G.S.F.C. #3 (Geometrical Sci-Fi Cyborg) - 20, Kadist, San Francisco, United States, and Paris, France
- Pérez Art Museum Miami, Miami, Florida, United States
- The Taguchi Art Collection, Japan

== Awards and honors ==
The artist has been awarded with the Ministry of Culture of Argentina, the Metropolitan; the Fund for the Arts of Buenos Aires and Mexicoʼs FONCA Conaculta, as well as several awards including the National Painting Award from the Central Bank of the Republic of Argentina, and The Golden Arches Latin American Painting Award.
