= Adri van Westerop =

Luxembourg chemist, author, and politician (1957-2009)

Adri van Westerop (9 December 1957 – 23 December 2009) was a Luxembourg politician, author and scientist. She was born in Haarlem, Netherlands. She moved to Luxembourg in 1983 and became the first environmental counselor in 1997.

As an engaged environmentalist, she set herself a more healthy and responsive life and sought to organize and broaden ecologically and socially responsible acts. The following topics were of particular interest to van Westerop: healthy eating, ecological construction, environmental protection, retailers responsibility, fair trade, and solidarity with developing countries. In January 2011 she was awarded the 2010 Help for Nature Award.

She was active in the press and in the media, and on different radio stations.

Adri van Westerop was married and mother of one child.

Van Westerop died 23 December 2009 in Luxembourg City, Luxembourg.

== Politics ==
Adri van Westerop was elected to the municipal council of Betzdorf in 1999. She was president of two communal commissions: the Climate Change Commission (the Alliance for the Climate) and the Foreign Commission. She was involved in the Climate Alliance and LEADER programme. Adri van Westerop was a candidate for the Greens for European elections - and for the Chamber elections.

== Bibliography ==
- Bohemia, Michel; van Westerop, Adri (1999). Oeko-Label für Tourismusbetriebe im Grossherzogtum Luxemburg : Informationsbroschüre = éco-label pour les établissements du secteur touristique au Grand-Duché de Luxembourg : brochure d'information [Ecolabel: label for tourism companies in the Grand Duchy of Luxembourg: Information brochure = Ecological label for the establishment of tourism sector in the Grand Duchy of Luxembourg: information brochure] (in Luxembourgish and French). Hengen, Luxembourg: Ministry of Tourism.
- Fehlen, Fernand; Felten, Marc; van Westerop, Adri; Schmitz, Carlo; Zimmer, Anne; Aendekerk, Raymond (1990). Essen: zwischen Fastfood und Öko-Kost. Forum fir kritesch Informatioun iwwer Politik, Kultur a Relioun [Food: between fast food and eco-food.] (in Luxembourgish). Vol. 124. Luxembourg: Forum for critical information on politics, culture and religion. pp. 17–42.
- Krippel, Yves; Schmidt, Gérard; van Westerop, Adri (1999). Thematische Rundwege im Gebiet des Stausees an der Obersauer : die Natur erleben, die Natur verstehen, die Natur erhalten [Thematic roundabouts in the area of the reservoir at the Obersauer: experience nature, understand nature, get nature.] (in Luxembourgish). Luxembourg: Stiftung Oeko-Fonds.
