= Air Paradise International =

Airline of Indonesia

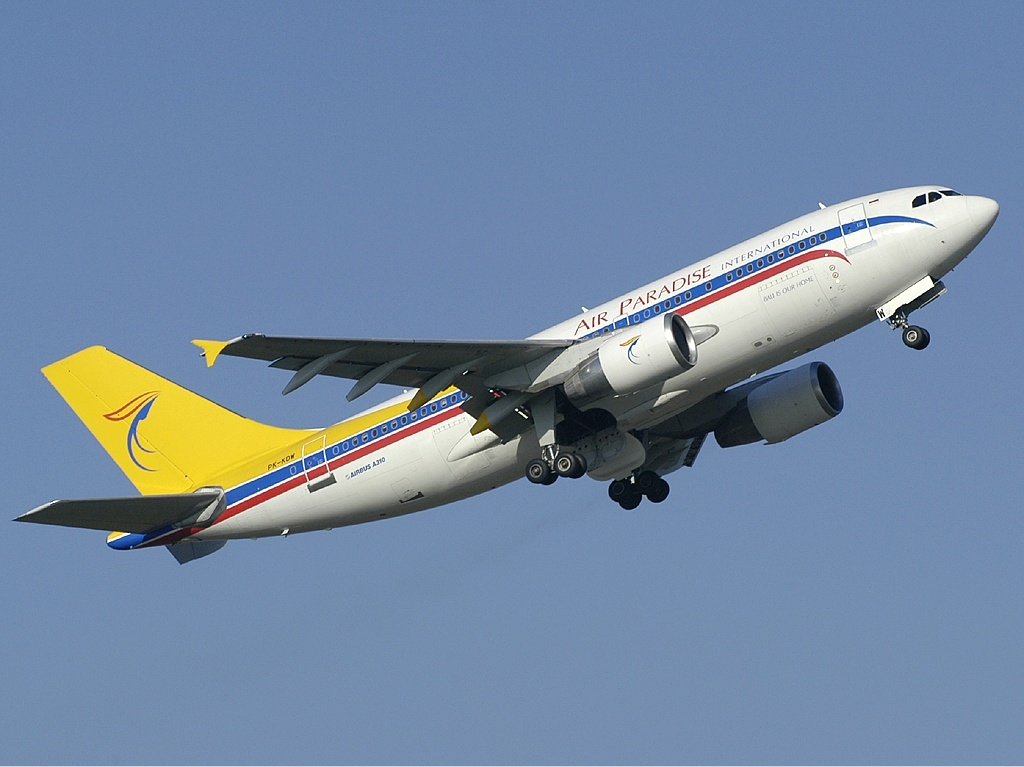
- Airbus A310-300 at Sydney Airport in 2004
IATA	ICAO	Call sign
AD	PRZ	RADISAIR
- Founded: 2002
- Ceased operations: 2005
- Hubs: Ngurah Rai International Airport
- Focus cities: Sydney, Seoul, Tokyo
- Frequent-flyer program: Paradise Birds
- Fleet size: 6
- Destinations: 7
- Headquarters: Denpasar

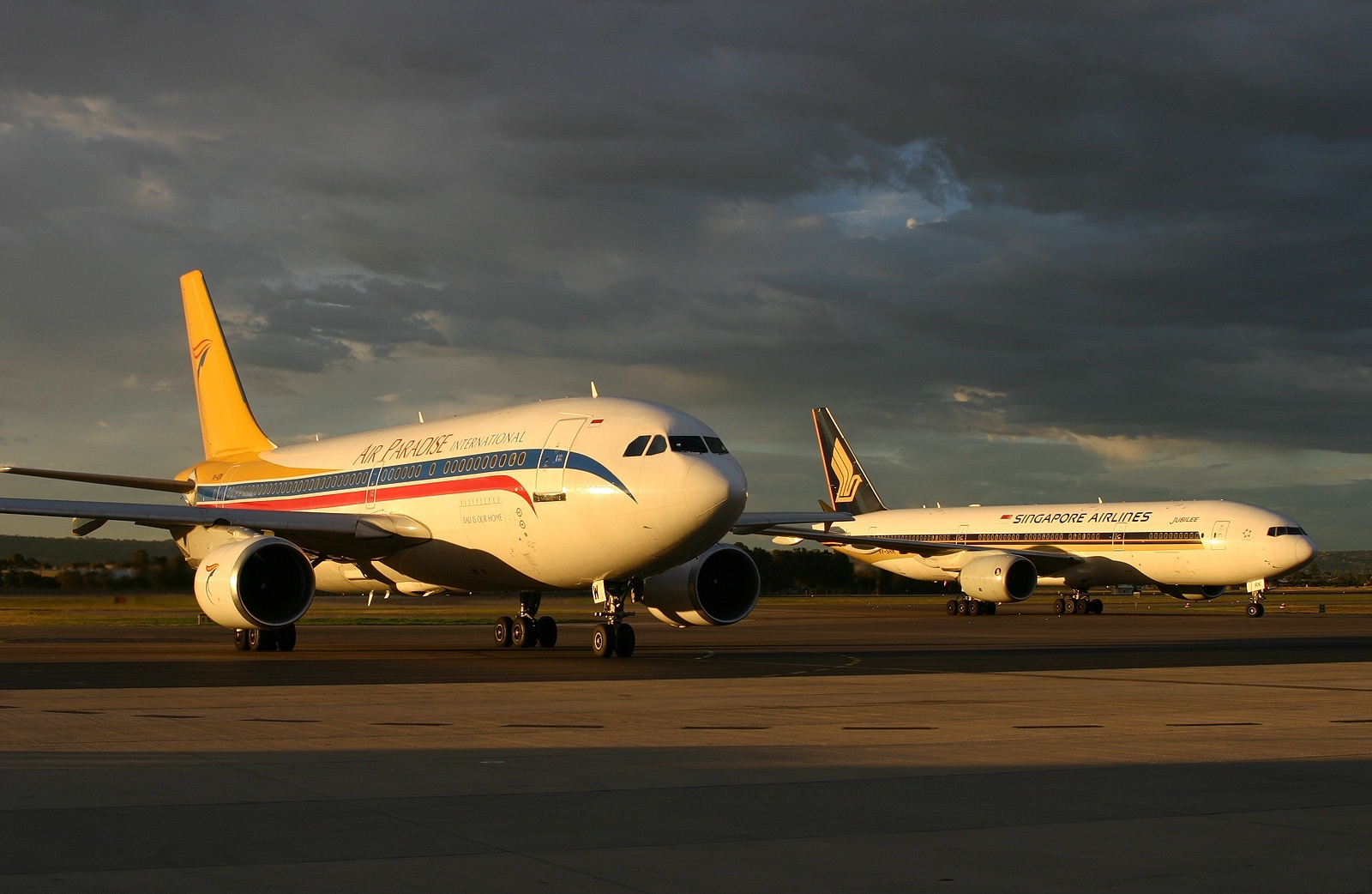
Airbus A310-300 operated as AD070, at Adelaide Airport in 2004

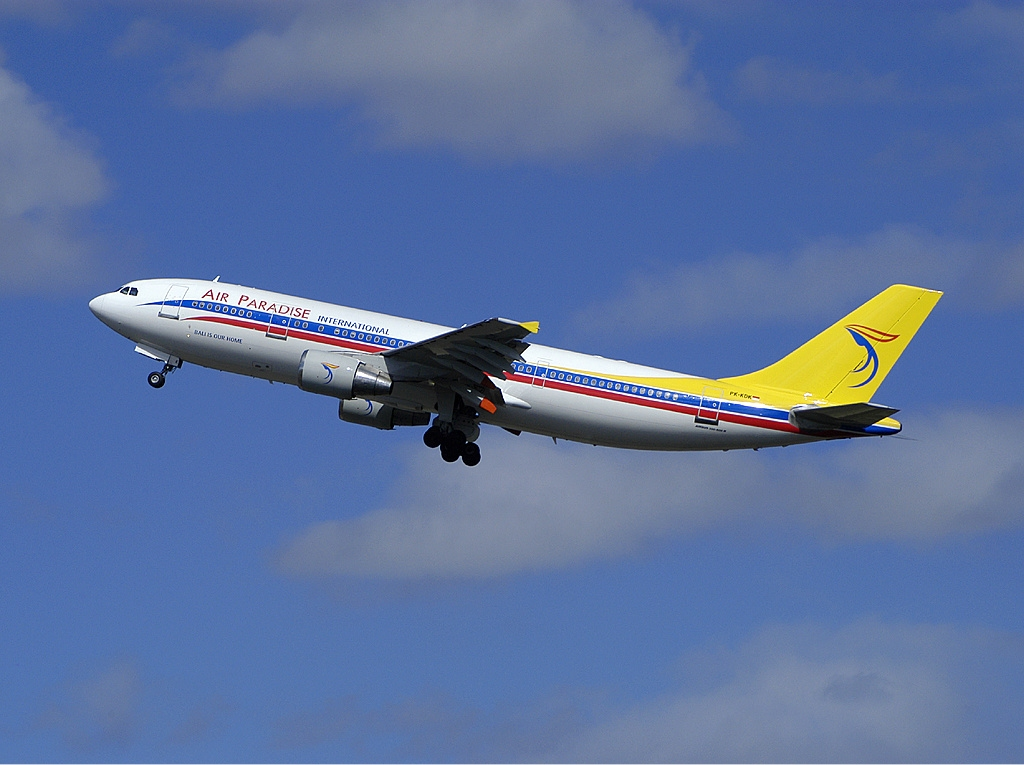
Airbus A300 at Sydney Airport in 2003

Air Paradise International was an airline based in Denpasar, Bali, Indonesia. It operated services to destinations in Australia, South Korea and Taiwan, from its main base at Ngurah Rai Airport, Denpasar. On 1 December 2005, the airline announced that it was ceasing operations due to a downturn in traffic, following terrorist bombings on the island in October 2005. In February 2007, the Indonesian Transportation Ministry delayed license revocation of 11 major airlines, including Air Paradise, to give restructuring opportunities to the operators. Air Paradise was considering re-launching services in March 2007. However, 3 years later, after ceasing operations in November 2005, the airline filed for bankruptcy, 5 months after another of its competitors (Adam Air) had filed for bankruptcy.

== History ==
The airline was established in June 2002 and started operations on 16 February 2003 with services to Perth in Australia from Denpasar, Bali. On 27 December 2004, services began to Osaka, Japan. All services were suspended on 1 December 2005 following a downturn of traffic after the October 2005 terrorist attacks in Bali which resulted in over 20 fatalities and 100 injuries. In June 2006 the website was still available, announcing negotiations to recapitalize the airline. Air Paradise was using A300s, A310s and leased 737-800s on flights to Melbourne, Sydney and Perth mostly for tourists. A major competitor on the Denpasar route was Garuda Indonesia. In November 2008, Air Paradise filed for bankruptcy after failing to re-launch operations and was the 2nd airline to file for bankruptcy in 5 months after Adam Air.

== Services ==
Air Paradise operated services to the following international scheduled destinations in January 2005: Adelaide, Brisbane, Melbourne, Osaka, Perth, Seoul and Sydney.

== Fleet ==
The Air Paradise operated the following aircraft during its operation:

Air Paradise International fleet
Aircraft	Total	Introduced	Retired
Airbus A300-600R	2	2003	2005
Airbus A310-300	2	2003	2005
Boeing 737-800	2	2004	2005
