= ADD (disambiguation) =

ADD, or attention deficit disorder, is a former name for attention deficit hyperactivity disorder.

Add or ADD may also refer to:

== Entertainment ==
- "A.D.D. (American Dream Denial)", a song on the 2002 album Steal This Album! by System of a Down
- "A.D.D", a song on the 1998 album Hard to Swallow by Vanilla Ice
- "ADD", a song on the 2017 album Mix & Match by Loona sub-unit Odd Eye Circle
- "ADD", a song on the 2022 album Cave World by Viagra Boys
- A.D.D. (Audio Day Dream), a 2007 album by Blake Lewis

== Science and technology ==
- Accumulated degree days, a measure of heating or cooling
- ADD, a SPARS code appearing on some compact disc recordings
- Addition, a mathematical operation
- ADD model, a hypothesis in physics
- Agency for Defense Development, a South Korean national research and development agency
- Android Developer Day
- Androsta-1,4-diene-3,17-dione, an intermediate in hormone synthesis
- Architectural design document (or sometimes Architectural decision document), part of a software design document
- Automatic dropping device, a safety system for a pantograph
- Applied Digital Data Systems, an early manufacturer of terminals, later subdivision of NCR

== Transport ==
- Adderley Park railway station, Birmingham, England
- Addis Ababa Bole International Airport in Addis Ababa City, Ethiopia

== Other uses ==
- Associate Deputy Director of the Federal Bureau of Investigation, US government position
- Anti-dumping duties; see Dumping (pricing policy)
- Atatürkist Thought Association (Turkish: Atatürkçü Düşünce Derneği), a Turkish secularism organization
- Avoid, Deny, Defend, a strategy for responding to active shooters
- Dzodinka language (ISO 639-3 code), a Niger-Congo language of Cameroon
- River Add, Scotland

== See also ==
- Accidental death and dismemberment insurance (AD&D)
- Advanced Dungeons & Dragons, an edition of the game Dungeons & Dragons
