= Ad de Boer =

Dutch politician

Ad de Boer (born 1946 in The Hague) is a Dutch politician and journalist.
