= Anno Domini (band) =

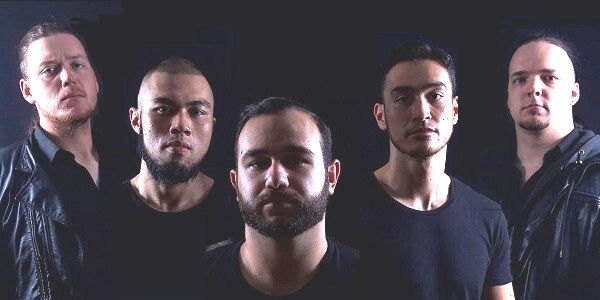
- October 2017

Background information
- Origin: Sydney, New South Wales, Australia
- Genres: Symphonic black metal; death metal
- Years active: 2005–present
- Labels: Independent
- Members: Amir Bukan; Dan Kendall; Danny Straughen; Andy Suppradit
- Past members: Michael Aldeguer; Iain McLure; Kieran Helmore; Miles Readman
- Website: www.facebook.com/annodominiband/

Anno Domini are an Australian symphonic black, death metal band. Formed in 2005, the band's line-up as from 2016 was Michael Aldeguer on guitars, Amir Bukan on drums and keyboards, Dan Kendall on bass guitar, Danny Straughen on guitars and Andy Suppradit on vocals.

The band's debut extended play, Original, came out in 2007 and there was another EP, The Downfall in 2012. They toured widely in 2011. In 2010 they released their debut album, Atrocities, and in 2016 followed with The Cold Expanse.

== Reception ==
Metal Obsession’s Mitch Booth observed of Atrocities: “Drums power along with a mechanical intensity, and the guitars gallop with melodic leads sneaking in here and there to give a few seconds’ rest. [Helmore]’s deep, smooth growl is huge, and the power really kicks up a notch when he comes in. Hiding in the background are some simple yet brilliantly used synths—they’re subtle, never taking over.” Peter Zaluzny of Loud Mag felt that they, "showcased their ability to seamlessly blend death metal and orchestral elements into hugely epic arrangements that were never over the top or cheesy." He noticed that their EP, The Downfall, "while taking a slightly different approach to their song writing in order to develop a more refined sound. It's a bold move by the band, and for the most part it works."

Reviewers of the relevant category of music praised the 2016 album. A reviewer, writing as "Robert in Death" on The Sonic Sensory, wrote on 20 June 2016 of The Cold Expanse: "... this five-piece bring together the better aspects of melodic death metal and somehow make it their own." He called Anno Domini a "quality band" and went on: "A symphonic introduction leads an hour-plus affair of building musicianship, harrowing atmospherics and a controlled sense of instrumentation."

== Band members ==
Current members

- Amir Bukan – Drums (2005–present), Keyboards, Programming (2008–present)
- Dan Kendall – Bass (2005–present)
- Danny Straughen – Guitars (2005–present)
- Andy Suppradit – Vocals (2016–present)

Former members

- Michael Aldeguer – Guitars (2016–2019)
- Iain McLure – Guitars (2005–2012)
- Kieran Helmore – Keyboards (2007), Vocals (2005–2012)
- Miles Readman – Vocals (2007)

== Discography ==
Studio albums

- Atrocities (2010)
- The Cold Expanse (2016)

Extended plays

- Original (2007)
- The Downfall EP (2012)

Demos

- Promo 2008 (2008)
