= Aad Oudt =

Dutch swimmer

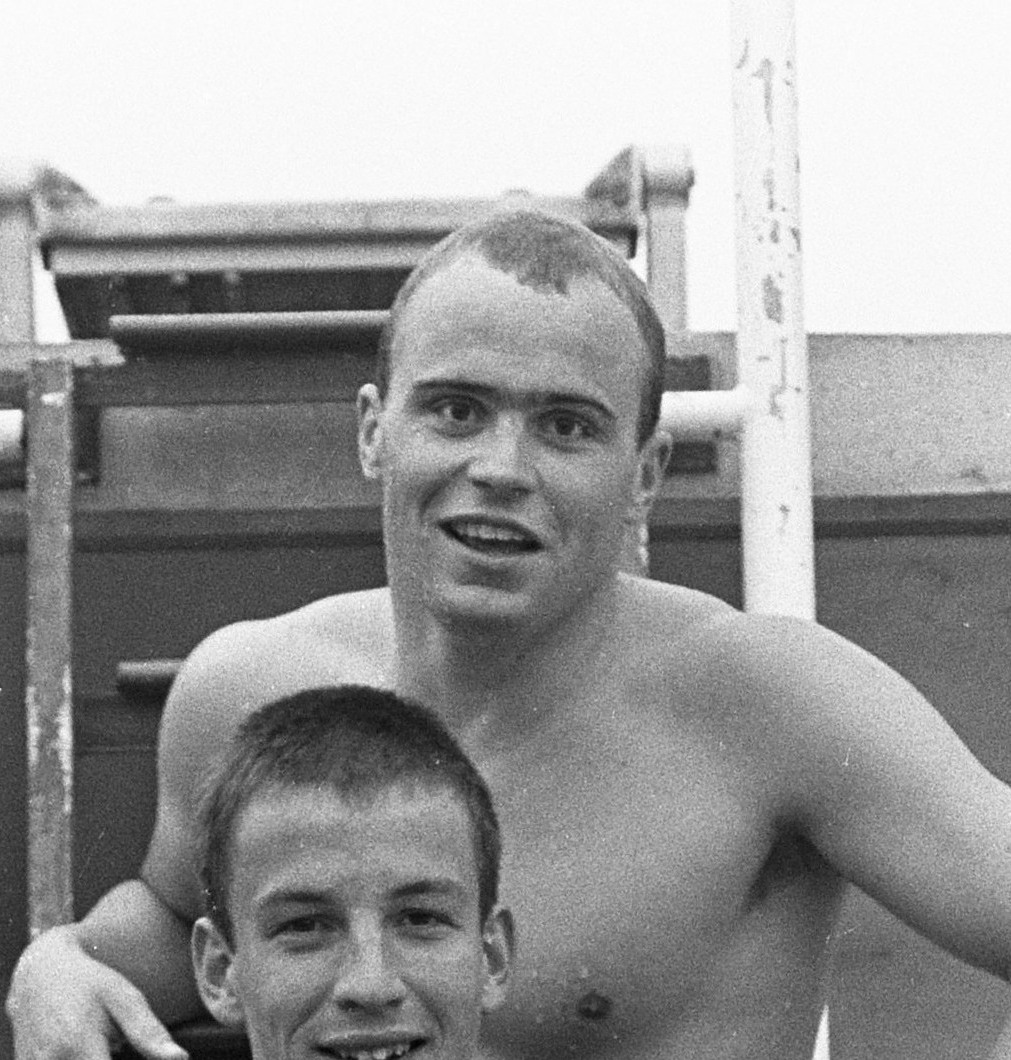
- Dutch Olympic 4 × 200 m freestyle team in 1968; Aad Oudt on top

Personal information
- Full name: Adriaan Frederik Oudt
- Born: 26 February 1946 (age 80) The Hague, Netherlands
- Height: 1.81 m (5 ft 11 in)
- Weight: 87 kg (192 lb)

Sport
- Sport: Swimming
- Club: HZ ZIAN, Den Haag

Adriaan Frederik "Aad" Oudt (born 26 February 1946) is a Dutch tax advisor and a former Olympian swimmer. He competed at the 1964 Summer Olympics in the 400 m freestyle and at the 1968 Summer Olympics in the 200 m and 4 × 200 m freestyle. He did not reach the final in either event.

Oudt hoped to graduate as a tax lawyer in 1969.
