= Arjen =

Arjen (also spelled as Arjan; feminine forms include Ariën and Arienne) is a masculine given name, a variant of the Dutch/Finnish name Adrian. Arjen (sometimes also Ariën) is derived from the Latin name Adrianus, meaning "native of, from Adria", a place near Venice. Adria is associated with Latin ater, meaning "dull black" or "dark", a reference to the dark sands along the coast of the Adriatic Sea. The name Arjen is mainly found in the Netherlands.

The name also occurs as a feminine given name in Belgium, where forms such as Ariën in Flemish and Arienne in Walloon usage can be found.

The name Arienne is a form of the name Ariane (Ariana), which comes from the Greek Ariadne. It means “most holy” or “pure” (ari — an intensifying prefix, adnos — holy). In Greek mythology, Ariadne is the heroine who helped Theseus escape the labyrinth using her thread.

The name Arien is also used for a character in J.R.R. Tolkien’s legendarium. In Tolkien’s mythology, Arien is a Maia, a spirit of fire chosen by the Valar to guide the vessel of the Sun across the sky. She is often referred to as the Guardian of the Sun.

Notable people with the name include:

- Arjen Kräling (born 2010), German racing driver
- Arjen Anthony Lucassen (born 1960), Dutch composer and musician
- Arjen Lenstra (born 1956), Dutch mathematician
- Arjen Lubach (born 1979), Dutch comedian
- Arjen Robben (born 1984), Dutch former professional footballer
- Arjen Roelofs (1754–1828), Dutch astronomer
- Arjen Teeuwissen (born 1971), Dutch equestrian
