= Adrianus Zwart =

Dutch painter

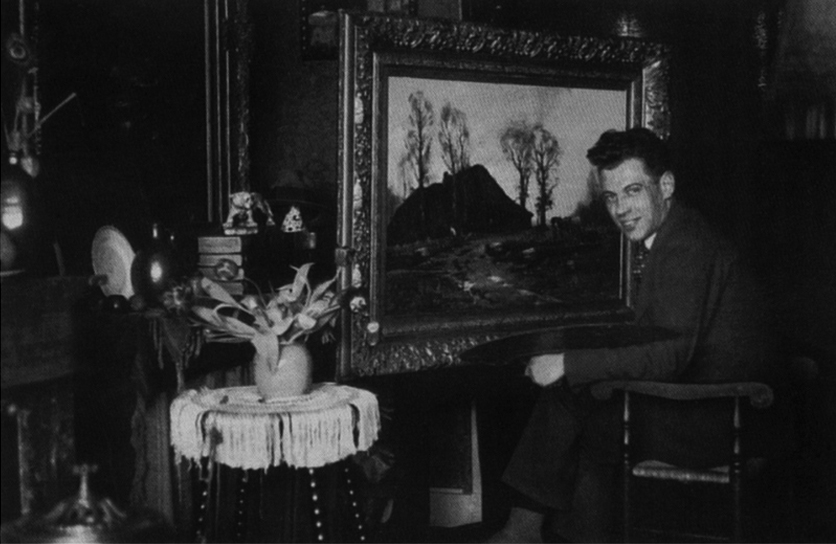
Arie Zwart

Adrianus Johannes "Arie" Zwart (30 August 1903, in Rijswijk – 27 August 1981, in Laren) was a Dutch painter and in his early work one of the last painters of the Hague School.

== Life ==
Zwart studied at the Royal Academy of Art, The Hague in 1918 and 1919. Until 1926 he worked also as a graphic designer. Zwart travelled in the 1920s with a car and later with a boat though the Netherlands to paint the traditional life and landscape of the country.

After 1949 he traveled to foreign countries and left the traditional Dutch painting.
