= Ad Kaland =

Dutch politician (1922–1995)

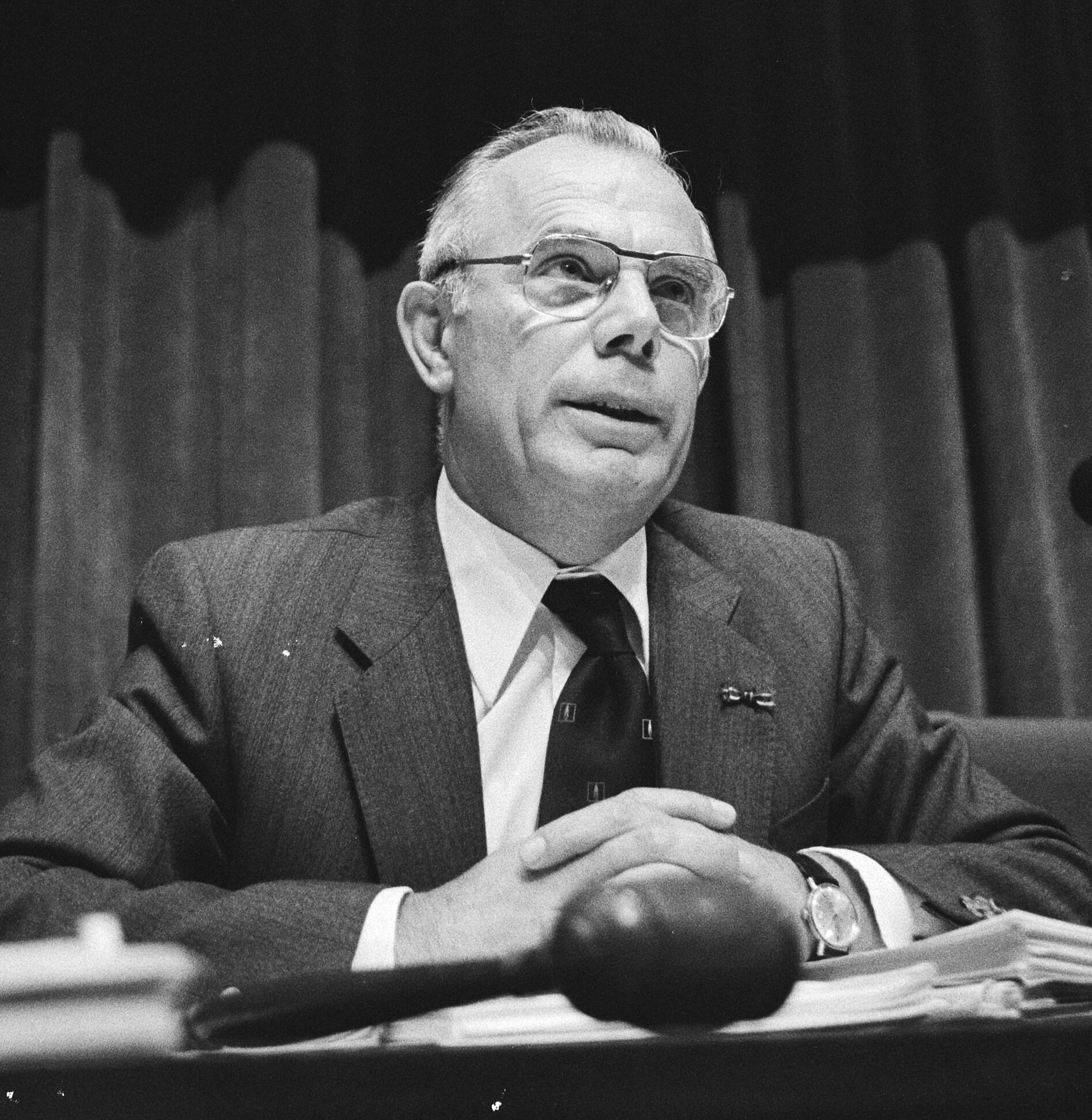
- Kaland in 1981

Member of the Senate
- In office 20 September 1977 – 31 December 1994

Member of the Provincial Executive of Zeeland
- In office 3 July 1962 – 7 June 1978

Alderman in Middelburg
- In office 2 September 1958 – 3 July 1962

Member of the Provincial Council of Zeeland
- In office 1 July 1958 – 3 July 1978

Member of the Middelburg Municipal Council
- In office 1 September 1953 – 3 September 1962

Personal details
- Born: Adriaan Jakobus Kaland; 13 March 1922 Westkapelle, Netherlands
- Died: 11 January 1995 (aged 72) Zoutelande, Netherlands
- Party: Christian Historical Union (until 1980); Christian Democratic Appeal (1980 onwards)

Adriaan Jakobus "Ad" Kaland (Dutch: [ɑt ˈkɑlɑnt]; 13 March 1922 – 11 January 1995) was a Dutch politician. Born in Westkapelle, he was a member of the municipal council of Middelburg between 1953 and 1962, serving as an alderman in his final four years. He joined the Provincial Council of Zeeland in 1958 and the Provincial Executive of Zeeland in 1962. He became a member of the Senate on 20 September 1977, and he left his provincial positions the following year. The Christian Historical Union (CHU), of which he was member, merged into the Christian Democratic Appeal (CDA) in 1980. Kaland became the CDA's parliamentary leader in the Senate, staying on until he left the body on 31 December 1994. He died in Zoutelande in 1978 aged 72.
