= Adri Rodrígues =

Andorran footballer (born 1988)

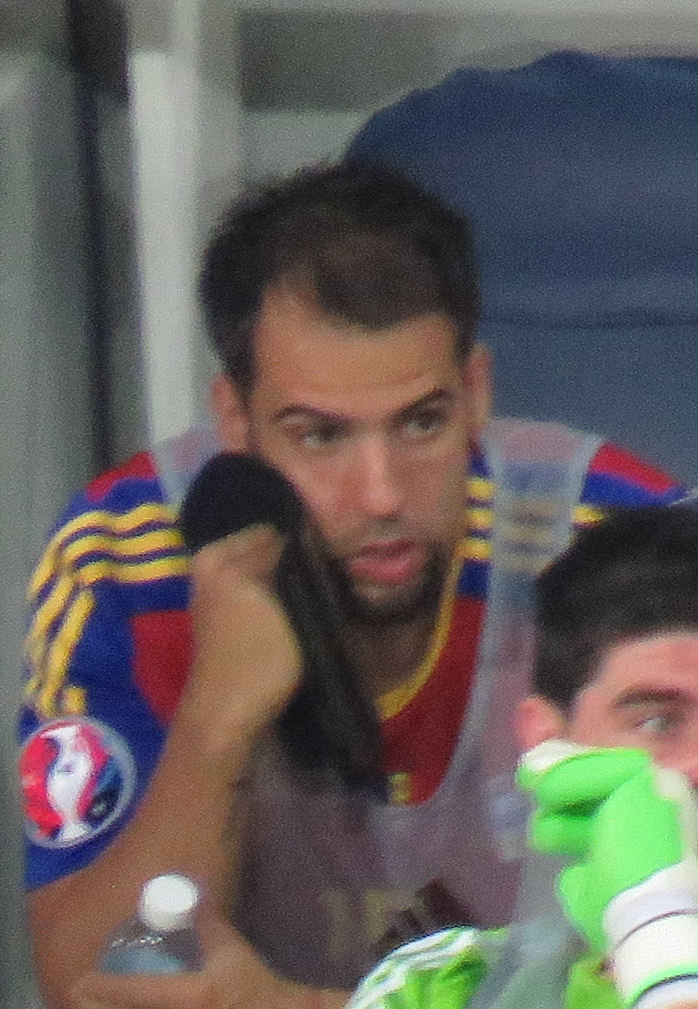

Personal information
- Full name: Adrián Rodrígues Gonçalves
- Date of birth: 14 August 1988 (age 38)
- Place of birth: Andorra la Vella, Andorra
- Height: 1.87 m (6 ft 1 1/2 in)
- Position: Right back

Team information
- Current team: Atlètic d'Escaldes
- Number: 4

Senior career*
Years	Team	Apps	(Gls)
2007–2010	FC Andorra		
2010–2011	Mensajero	37	(1)
2011	Puerta Bonita	2	(0)
2011–2012	Vilanova	8	(0)
2012	Huracán Z	16	(1)
2012–2013	Racing Lermeño	14	(1)
2013	Burgos	3	(0)
2013	Racing Lermeño	1	(0)
2013–2014	Collado Villalba	6	(0)
2014–2015	Salmantino	30	(2)
2015	Marino Luanco	16	(0)
2015–2016	Villarrobledo	33	(2)
2016–2017	Quintanar Rey	13	(0)
2017	Villarrobledo	20	(1)
2017–2018	Parla	7	(0)
2018	Colmenar Viejo	10	(0)
2018–2019	Lusitanos	26	(0)
2019–	Atlètic d'Escaldes	51	(5)

International career^{‡}
2012–	Andorra	21	(0)
- * Club domestic league appearances and goals as of 22 May 2022 ‡ National team caps and goals as of 28 March 2022

Adrián Rodrígues Gonçalves (born 14 August 1988) is an Andorran footballer who plays as a right back for Atlètic Club d'Escaldes and the Andorra national football team.

== Club career ==
Rodrígues started his career playing for FC Andorra in the season 2007–08. In 2010, he signed a contract with Mensajero from the Spanish third division (fourth level). During season 2011–12 he played in different teams, playing for Huracán Z. In 2012, he played for Racing Lermeño. and the historical Spanish club Burgos.

After playing for Collado Villalba and Salmantino, He signed for Marino de Luanco in January 2015 to play in the Spanish Segunda División B (third level).

=== International career ===
Rodrígues represented the under 21-team Andorran team before his senior team debut for Andorra in 2012.
