= Time domain electromagnetics =

In engineering, time domain electromagnetics refers to one of two general groups of techniques (in mathematics, often called ansätze) that describe electromagnetic wave motion. In contrast with frequency domain electromagnetics, which are based on the Fourier or Laplace transform, time domain keeps time as an explicit independent variable in descriptive equations or wave motion.
