= Ad Wammes =

Dutch composer (born 1953)

Ad Wammes (born 1953, Vreeswijk) is a Dutch composer. His notable compositions include pieces "Miroir" ("Mirror", 1989) for organ, and "Different Colours", two books which contain 12 pieces each for piano.
