= Ari (name) =

Ari is a given name in many languages and cultures, for both men and women. It also may be a nickname for a wide variety of unrelated names.

== Etymology ==
=== Albanian ===
In the Albanian language, "Ari" means "gold" and is used as a male name .

=== Armenian ===
In Armenian, Ari is a boy's name meaning brave.

=== Badaga ===
Ari in the Badaga language, "Ari" ("A:ri") has a literal meaning of "sun-like" and is used as a male name, sometimes changed to "Harry" in the case of converts to Christianity.

=== English ===
In English, Ari may be used as a form of Harry influenced by the names French pronunciation. It may also be used as a nickname for names such as Ariel, Aryan and others.

=== Finnic languages ===
Ari is thought to be a Finnic form of Adrian.

=== Greek ===
Ari or Aris is a common shortened version of the Greek names Aristotle, Ariadne, Ariana, Arietta, Aristides, Aristarchus, Aristomenes, Aristobulos, Aristoxenos, Aristos, Aristophanes, Aristea, Aristotelis, and others, the majority of which are compounds of the adjectival superlative áristos, "best" or "superior". They are also modern Greek transliterations for Ares, the god of war and the name for the planet Mars. The archaic Greek prefix ari- (e.g. in Ariadne, Arimnestus etc.) or eri-, a cognate of áristos, means "very" or "verily".

=== Hebrew ===
Ari is a common masculine given name in Hebrew (אריה/ארי). It means lion.

=== Scandinavian ===
Ari is a given name in Old Norse, Icelandic, Faroese, Danish, Norwegian and Swedish and means eagle or is the pet form of the names starting with Arn- or Old Norse ari "eagle".

== Notable people named Ari ==
- Ari Ahonen (born 1981), Finnish ice hockey goaltender
- Ari Angervo (born 1944), Finnish classical violinist and conductor
- Ari Anjala, Finnish orienteering competitor
- Ari Ankorin (1908–1986), Israeli politician and lawyer
- Ari Aster, American filmmaker and screenwriter
- Ari Babakhanov, Uzbek musician
- Ari Balogh (born 1964), American businessman and racing driver
- Ari Banias, American poet
- Ari Behn (1972–2019), Norwegian author and husband of Princess Märtha Louise of Norway
- Ari Ben-Menahem, Israeli seismologist, author, polymath, historian of science, professor
- Ari Ben-Menashe (born 1952), Iranian-born Israeli businessman, security consultant and author
- Ari Berk (born 1967), American writer
- Ari Berman (born 1970), American-Israeli rabbi, the fifth President of Yeshiva University
- Ari Borovoy (born 1979), Mexican musician
- Ari Boyland (born 1987), New Zealand actor
- Ari Bozão (born 1969), Brazilian footballer
- Ari Brown (born 1944), American jazz musician
- Ari Brynjolfsson (1927–2013), Icelandic physicist
- Ari Carlos (1933–2011), Brazilian football goalkeeper
- Ari Clemente (born 1939), Brazilian footballer
- Ari Cohen, Canadian actor
- Ari Djepaxhia (born 1991), Albanian footballer
- Ari Eldjárn (born 1981), Icelandic stand-up comedian, writer and actor
- Ari Elon (born 1950), Israeli writer, Bible scholar, and educator
- Ari Emanuel (born 1961), American talent agent
- Ari Fitz (born 1989), American model, vlogger, television personality and film producer
- Ari Fleischer (born 1960), former White House Press Secretary for U.S. President George W. Bush
- Ari Folman (born 1962), Israeli film director, screenwriter and film score composer
- Ari Freyr Skúlason (born 1987), Icelandic footballer
- Ari Fuji (born 1968), pilot in command and flight instructor in Japan
- Ari Gibson (born 1983), Australian artist, animator and video game designer.
- Ari Glass (born 1989), American painter, designer and musician
- Ari Gold (filmmaker), American filmmaker, actor, musician
- Ari Gold (musician) (born 1977), American R&B artist
- Ari L. Goldman (born 1949), American journalist and professor
- Ari Goldwag (born 1979), American Orthodox Jewish singer, songwriter, composer, author and teacher
- Ari Graynor (born 1983), American actress
- Ari Greenberg (born 1981), American contract bridge player
- Ari Gröndahl (born 1989), Finnish ice hockey defenceman
- Ari Guðmundsson (1927–2003), Icelandic swimmer and ski jumper
- Ari Trausti Guðmundsson (born 1948), Icelandic geologist, author, broadcaster, mountaineer and explorer
- Ari Haanpää (born 1965), Finnish ice hockey player
- Ari Handel, American neuroscientist, film producer and writer
- Ari Harow (born 1973), American-born Israeli political consultant
- Ari Harrison, Australian film industry executive
- Ari Heikkinen (footballer, born 1957), Finnish footballer
- Ari Heikkinen (footballer, born 1964), Finnish footballer
- Ari Helenius (born 1944), Finnish emeritus professor of biochemistry
- Ari Herstand (born 1985), American singer/songwriter
- Ari Hest (born 1979), American singer-songwriter
- Ari Hjelm (born 1962), Finnish football coach and former player
- Ari Hoenig (born 1973), American jazz drummer, composer and educator
- Ari Hoogenboom (1927–2014), American historian
- Ari Hoptman (born 1967), American actor and playwright
- Ari Huumonen (1956–2013), Finnish discus thrower
- Ari Ichihashi (市橋 有里; born 1977), Japanese long-distance runner
- Ari Jabotinsky (1910–1969), Revisionist Zionist activist, Israeli politician and academic
- Ari Joshua, American guitarist, songwriter, member of the band Big High
- Ari Jónsson (born 1994), Faroese footballer
- Ari Jósefsson (1939–1964), Icelandic poet
- Ari Kane, American crossdresser, activist, educator, and a founder of the Fantasia Fair
- Ari Kattainen (born 1958), Finnish orienteering competitor
- Ari Kelman, American historian and professor
- Ari Koivunen (born 1984), Finnish heavy metal singer
- Ari Koponen (politician) (born 1982), Finnish politician and MP
- Ari Lahti (born 1963), Finnish businessman, President of Football Association of Finland
- Ari Laptev (born 1950), Russian mathematician
- Ari Lasso (born 1973), Indonesian musician
- Ari Leff (born 1994), American singer and songwriter
- Ari Lehman (born 1965), American actor and performance artist
- Ari Leifsson (born 1998), Icelandic footballer
- Ari Lemmke (born 1963), Finnish computer programmer
- Ari Lennox (born 1991), American singer and songwriter
- Ari Lesser (born 1986), Jewish American rapper, singer, songwriter and spoken word artist
- Ari Libsker (born 1972), Israeli filmmaker and journalist
- Ari Lohenoja (born 1958), Finnish television producer and director
- Ari Luotonen, Finnish software developer and author
- Ari Magder (1983–2012), Canadian-born American actor
- Ari Mannio (born 1987), Finnish javelin thrower
- Ari Marcopoulos (born 1957), Dutch-American photographer and filmmaker
- Ari Marmell (born 1974), American novelist and game writer
- Ari Melber (born 1980), American journalist
- Ari Benjamin Meyers (born 1972), American artist and composer
- Ari Meyers (born 1969), American actress
- Ari Millen (born 1982), Canadian actor
- Ari Moisanen (born 1971), Finnish professional ice hockey goaltender
- Ari Mustonen, Finnish cross-country skier
- Ari Ne'eman (born 1987), American autism rights activist
- Ari Norman, British designer of silver jewellery and gifts
- Ari Nyman (born 1984), Finnish footballer
- Ari Ólafsson (born 1998), Icelandic singer
- Ari de Oliveira (1932–1977), Brazilian football goalkeeper
- Aristotle Onassis (1906–1975), Greek shipping magnate and husband of Jacqueline Kennedy
- Ari Ozawa (born 1992), Japanese voice actress
- Ari Pakarinen (born 1969), Finnish javelin thrower
- Ari Palolahti (born 1968), Finnish cross-country skier
- Ari Paunonen (born 1958), Finnish runner
- Ari Peltonen, Finnish a cappella rock singer known as Paska
- Ari Porth (born 1970), American attorney, jurist, and politician
- Ari Poutiainen (born 1972), Finnish jazz musician and composer
- Ari Puheloinen (born 1951), Finnish general
- Ari Pulkkinen (born 1982), Finnish video game composer, musician, and sound designer
- Ari Rath (1925–2017), Austrian-Israeli journalist and writer
- Ari Renaldi, Indonesian composer, sound and mixing engineer, music director and musician
- Ari Romero (1951–2013), Mexican professional wrestler
- Ari Rosenberg (born 1964), Israeli basketball player
- Ari Roth (born 1961), American theatrical producer, playwright, director, and educator
- Ari Saarinen (born 1967), Finnish ice hockey player
- Ari Salin (1947–2026), Finnish hurdler and sprinter
- Ari Sandel (born 1974), American filmmaker
- Ari Santos (born 1982), Brazilian futsal player
- Ari Schwartz, American Internet Policy Advisor
- Ari Shaffir (born 1974), American stand-up comedian
- Ari Shapiro (born 1978), American radio journalist
- Ari Daniel Shapiro, American science journalist
- Ari Shavit (born 1957), Israeli reporter and writer
- Ari Sihvola (born 1957), Finnish engineer and academician
- Ari Singh II (1724–1773), Maharana of Mewar Kingdom
- Ari Sitas (born 1952), South African sociologist, writer, dramatist and civic activist
- Ari Freyr Skúlason (born 1987), Icelandic international footballer
- Ari de Souza (born 1939), Brazilian football forward
- Ari Starace (born 1994), known as Y2K, American record producer and songwriter
- Ari Stidham (born 1992), American actor and musician
- Ari Suhonen (born 1965), Finnish middle-distance runner
- Ari Sulander (born 1969), Finnish ice hockey goaltender
- Ari Taub (director) (born 1965), American filmmaker
- Ari Taub (wrestler) (born 1971), Canadian Greco-Roman wrestler
- Ari Telch (born 1962), Mexican actor
- Ari Þorgilsson (1067–1148), Icelandic medieval chronicler
- Ari Tissari (1951–2023), Finnish footballer
- Ari Torniainen (born 1956), Finnish politician and MP
- Ari Up (1962–2010), German-born singer
- Ari Väänänen (born 1947), Finnish long jumper
- Ari Vallin (born 1978), Finnish former professional ice hockey defenceman
- Ari Valvee (born 1960), Finnish footballer
- Ari Vatanen (born 1952), Finnish politician and former rally driver
- Ari Wallach (born 1974), Mexican-American businessman
- Ari Westergård (1948–2010), Finnish sports shooter
- Ari Westphal (born 1994), Brazilian fashion model
- Ari Wolfe (born 1971), American play-by-play announcer, reporter and anchor
- Ari Joshua Zucker, American guitarist and songwriter

=== Fictional characters ===
- Ari, one of nine main heroes in the game Minecraft
- Ari Ben Canaan, protagonist in the novel Exodus by Leon Uris and the 1960 film adaptation, played by Paul Newman
- Ari Gold, on the comedy-drama television series Entourage
- Ari Haswari, an antagonist in NCIS
- Ari Tasarov, from the TV series Nikita
- Ari Tenenbaum, character in Wes Anderson's 2001 movie The Royal Tenenbaums
- Ari, one of two friends who often accompany Elinor in Elinor Wonders Why
- Ari, a character from Class of '09 (franchise)

== See also ==
- Ari, for other uses
- Arie, a Dutch and Hebrew masculine name
- Arieh (disambiguation)
