= Helsingin Suomalainen Yhteiskoulu =

SYK Helsingin Suomalainen Yhteiskoulu
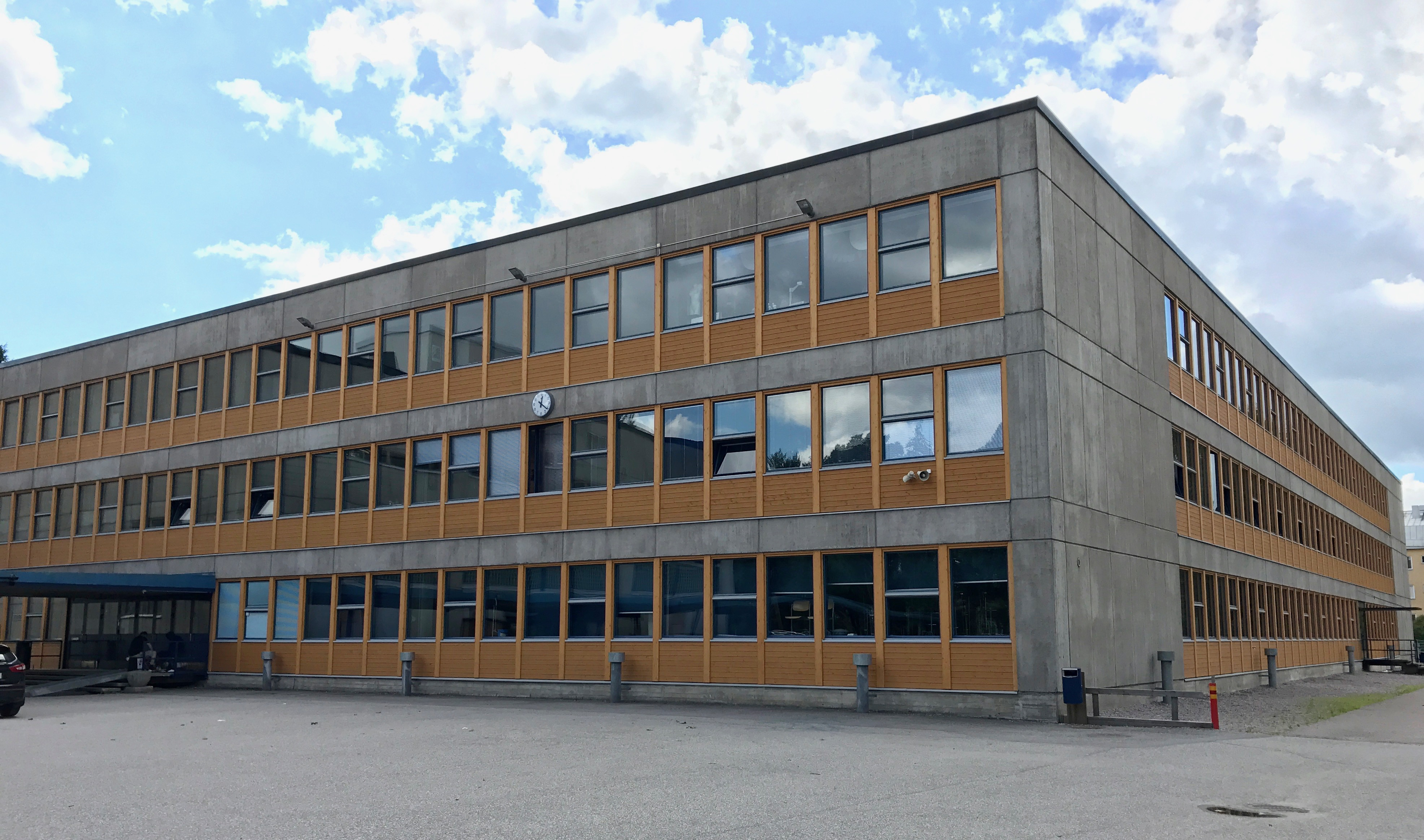
- Helsingin Suomalainen Yhteiskoulu

Location
- Etelä-Haaga, Helsinki; Finland
- Coordinates: 60.2119537°N 24.8891857°E

Information
- Type: Secondary, Sixth Form
- Established: 1886
- Principal: Sari Tiitta
- Grades: Lower and upper secondary, High School (grades 3–12)
- Gender: Mixed
- Enrollment: c. 2000
- Language: Finnish, English
- Campus type: Suburban
- Website: syk.fi

Helsingin Suomalainen Yhteiskoulu, commonly abbreviated SYK (English: "Helsinki Finnish co-educational school"), is a private and free elementary, middle and high school in the Etelä-Haaga district of Helsinki, Finland.

== History ==
SYK was founded in 1886. Its roots trace back to a group of Finnish intellectuals whose aim was to found a Finnish-language lycée for female students in order to further the education of women in Finland. By the time that this group had raised enough funds to actually found the school, the ideal of coeducational schools had gained so much ground among the members that the school that was founded in 1886 became a coeducational one. SYK was the first Finnish-language coeducational school in Finland.

== SYK today ==
SYK continues to be held in high regard. It offers education from 3rd to 9th grade as well as the three high school years. The school's matriculation examination results are usually among the best in Finland. According to a 2010 survey, compared to most other secondary education institutes, the majority of alumni continue with university-level studies, especially in fields such as engineering, economics or legal studies at prestigious Finnish universities.

SYK is one of the 15 schools in Finland to offer the IB Diploma Programme in the equivalent of the 11th and 12th grades. The IB program acceptance rate at SYK is 9-11% annually for prospective students. The School's average IB grade is 37/45, ranking the school high in IB final examinations world wide.

SYK takes in students from all over the Helsinki metropolitan area in addition to its own district. Places are limited, so second graders have to pass entrance tests to get in. Tests measure mostly command of written Finnish and readiness to learn foreign languages, in line with the official "language focus" in the school's curriculum.

== Language education ==
3rd graders begin with French, German or Russian as their first foreign language; English is only offered to those whose English level is native, or who have had their first school years taught in English.

In year five they start studying English. A year later, 6th graders take on Swedish as the second national language. Elective fourth language starts in year eight (French, German, Japanese, or Russian), and more are available in the high school. A typical high school graduate takes the matriculation exam in 2 to 4 foreign languages.

== Notable alumni ==
- Esa-Pekka Salonen (orchestral conductor)
- Atso Almila (orchestral conductor)
- Teppo Felin (professor at the University of Oxford)
- Erkki Tuomioja (Minister of Foreign Affairs)
- Eljas Erkko (Foreign Minister of Finland)
- Tarja Cronberg (Minister of Labour)
- Matti Wuori (lawyer and member of the European Parliament)
- Henrik Tikkanen (author and artist)
- Olli Mustonen (pianist)
- Tomi Mäkelä (pianist)
- Ora Lassila (computer scientist)
- Heikki Mannila (computer scientist)
- Pentti Linkola (philosopher, activist and author)
- Saima Harmaja (poet)
- Minna Lindgren (writer)
- Suvi-Anne Siimes (politician)
- Juhana Vartiainen (politician)
- Mauri Ryömä (politician)
- Tuomari Nurmio (musician)
- Pyhimys (musician)
- Kim Borg (musician)
- Antti Siirala (musician)
- Ari Angervo (musician)
- Nina Tapio (musician)
- Markku Luolajan-Mikkola (musician)
- Erik W. Tawaststjerna (musicologist)
- Petteri Salomaa (operatic bass-baritone)
- Aino Kallas (author)
- Rolf Nevanlinna (mathematician)
- Olli Lehto (mathematician)
- Yrjö Soini (novelist)
- Kimmo Koskenniemi (inventor of finite-state two-level models for computational phonology and morphology)
- Aarne Ervi (architect)
- Heikki Siren (architect)
- Pentti Sammallahti (photographer)
- Erik Bruun (graphic designer)
- Ari Lohenoja (businessperson)
- Antti Herlin (businessperson)
- Mika Tiivola (businessperson)
- Juuso Walden (industrial leader)
- Aatos Erkko (main owner of Sanoma Corporation and the Helsingin Sanomat newspaper)
- Eero Erkko (journalist and politician)
- Elina Salo (actress)
- Elina Pohjanpää (actress)
- Rauha Rentola (actress)
- Ritva Arvelo (actress)
- Helena Vierikko (actress)
- Matti Oravisto (actor)
- Paavo Jännes (actor)
- Laura Ruohonen (theatre director)
- Iiro Seppänen (producer and director)
- Mauno Manninen (producer and director)
- Mika Taanila (film director)
- Heikki Aho (filmmaker)
- Niilo Jääskinen (lawyer)
- Helena Salonius (actress and opera singer)
- Juhana Vartiainen (mayor of Helsinki, economist)
- Eeva Jalavisto (professor of physiology, gerontologist)
- Ilmari Kärki, ”Ibe” (musician)
- Miki Kuusi (entrepreneur and start-up founder)
