= Ari Koponen =

Ari Koponen may refer to:

- Ari Koponen (politician)
- Ari Koponen (speedway rider)
