= Ari Heikkinen =

Ari Heikkinen may refer to:

- Ari Heikkinen (footballer, born 1957), Finnish footballer
- Ari Heikkinen (footballer, born 1964), Finnish footballer
