= Joxe =

Name

Joxe is a Basque masculine given name (equivalent to José) and a French surname. Notable people with the name include:

== People with the given name ==
- Joxe Austin Arrieta (born 1949), Spanish writer and translator
- Joxe Azurmendi (1941–2025), Spanish writer, philosopher, essayist and poet
- Joxe Joan González de Txabarri (born 1956), Spanish philologist and politician
- Joxe Mari Olasagasti (born 1959), Spanish sportsman
- Joxe Mendizabal (born 1970), Spanish musician, composer and producer
- Joxe Ulibarrena (1924–2020), Spanish sculptor and ethnographer

== People with the surname ==
- François Joxe (1940–2020), French actor, director, playwright and painter
- Louis Joxe (1901–1991), French statesman, judge, and politician
- Pierre Joxe (born 1934), French politician, son of Louis

== See also ==
- Joxe Ripiau, Spanish musical group
