= Freedom of the City =

Honour bestowed by a municipality

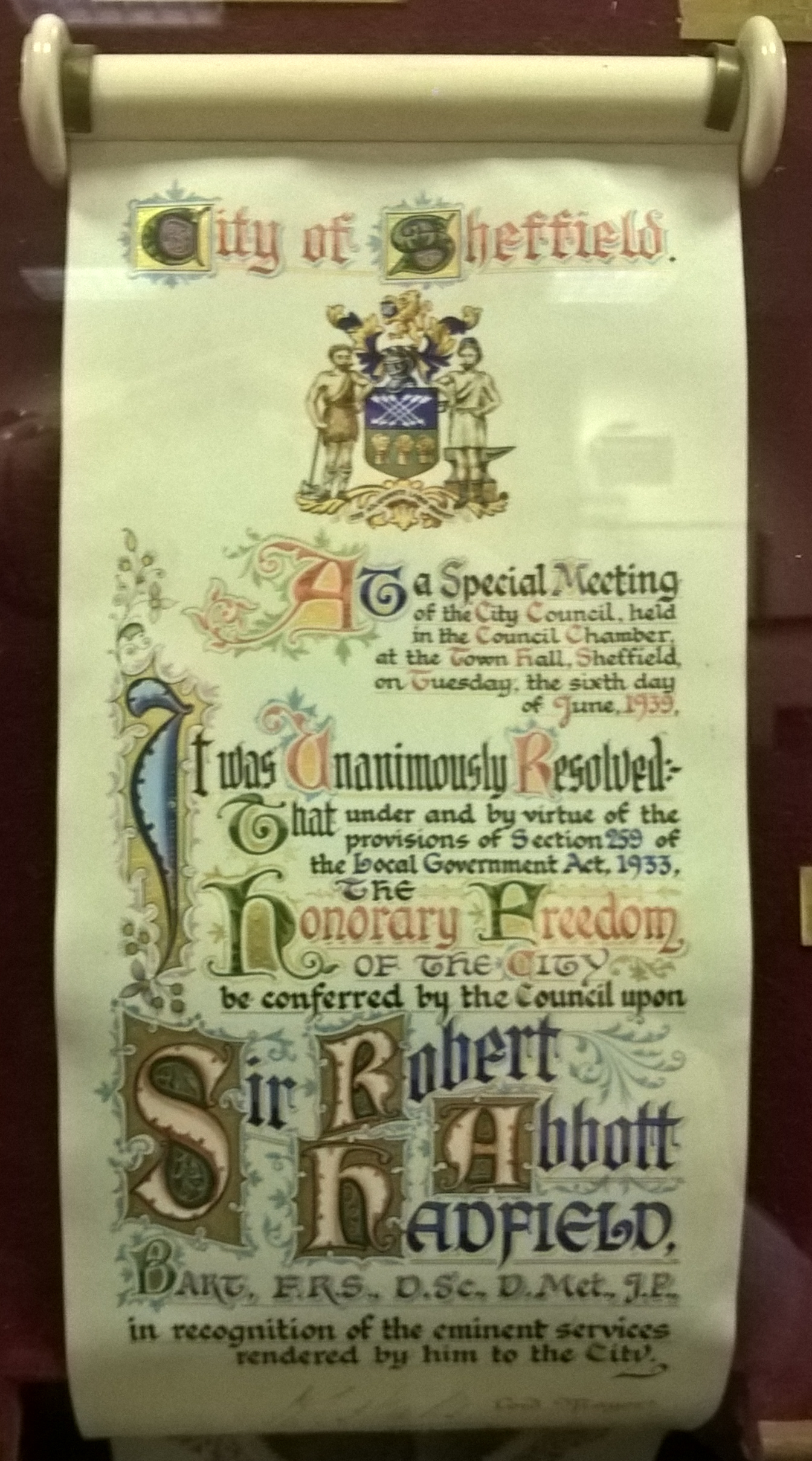
Award to Sir Robert Hadfield by the City of Sheffield, 1939 (Hadfield Room, University of Sheffield)

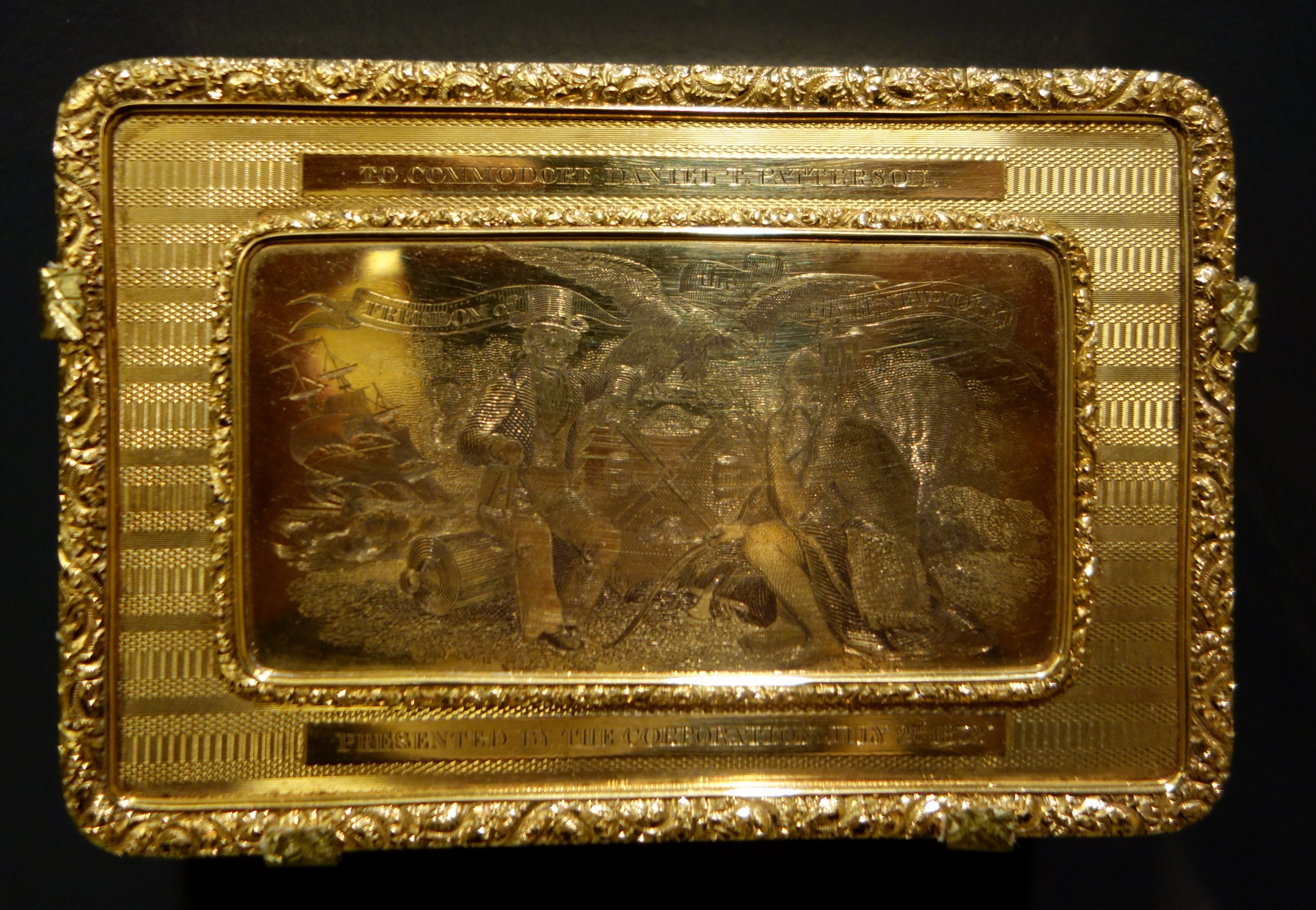
Gold New York City 'Freedom of the City Box' presented to Commodore Daniel Patterson, made by Jonathan Wilmarth, John L. Moffat, and Joseph Curtis, 1832

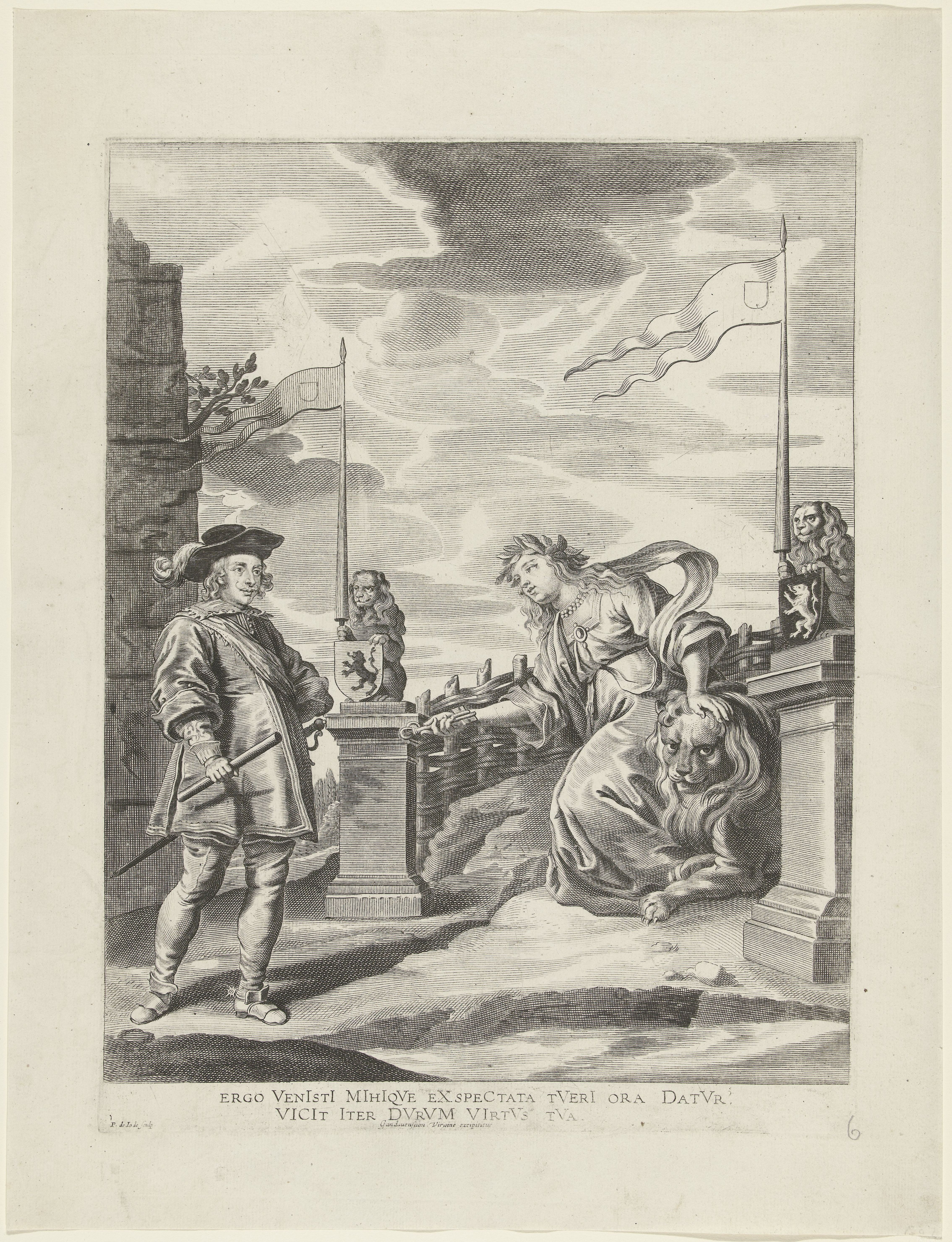
"Ferdinand Receives the Keys of the City from the Virgin of Ghent", print after a painting made by Antoon van den Heuvel for the Joyous Entry by the Cardinal-Infante Ferdinand into Ghent in 1635

The Freedom of the City (or Borough in some parts of the UK) is connected to the medieval concept of "free status", when city and town charters drew a distinction between freemen and vassals of a feudal lord. As such, freemen actually pre-date modern boroughs. Early freedom of the boroughs ceremonies had great importance in affirming that the recipient enjoyed privileges such as the right to trade and own property, and protection within the town.

In modern society, the award of honorary freedom of the city or borough tends to be entirely ceremonial, given by the local government in many towns and cities on those who have served in some exceptional capacity, or upon any whom the city wishes to bestow an honour, an honour bestowed by a municipality upon a valued member of the community, or upon a visiting celebrity or dignitary. Arising from the medieval practice of granting respected citizens freedom from serfdom, the tradition still lives on in countries such as the United Kingdom, United States, Ireland, Australia, Canada and New Zealand; today, the title of "freeman" confers no special privileges. The Freedom of the City can also be granted by municipal authorities to military units which have earned the city's trust; in this context, it is sometimes called the Freedom of Entry. This allows them the freedom to parade through the city, and is an affirmation of the bond between the regiment and the citizenry.

The honour was sometimes accompanied by a "freedom box", a small gold box inscribed to record the occasion; these are not usual today. In some countries, such as the United States, esteemed residents and visitors may instead be presented with the Key to the City, a similarly symbolic honour. Other US cities award Honorary Citizenship with just a certificate.

== Entitlement to civil privileges ==
=== United Kingdom ===
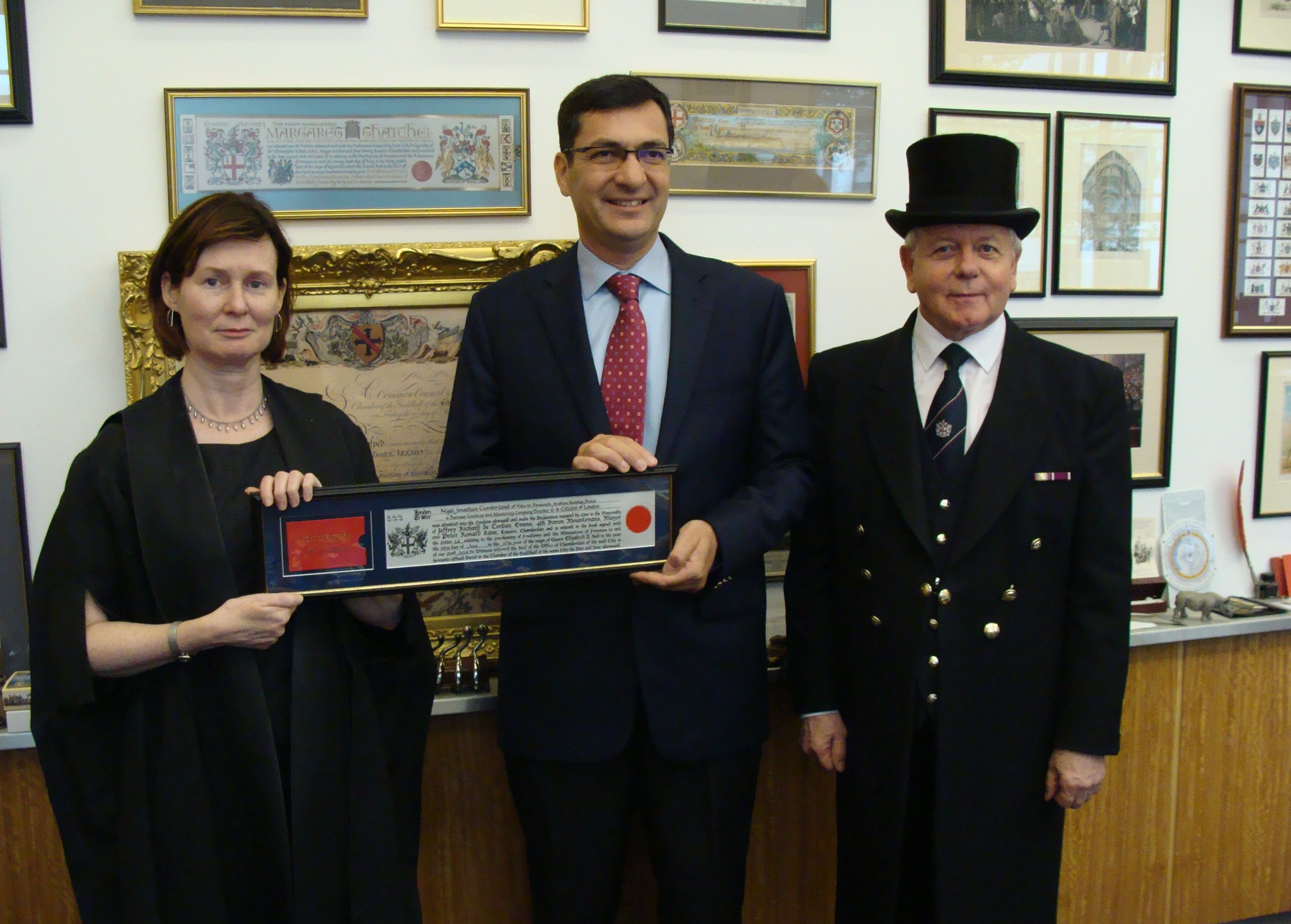
A recipient of Freedom of the City of London, Nigel Cumberland, after his ceremony

Before parliamentary reform in 1832, freedom of the city or town conferred the right to vote in the parliamentary boroughs for the MPs. Until the Municipal Corporations Act 1835 the freemen were the exclusive electorate for some of the boroughs. These two acts together curtailed the power of the freemen and extended the franchise to all "householders" (defined as local rate payers; in fact therefore property owners). The private property belonging to the freemen collectively was retained. The freemen of York, Oxford and Newcastle upon Tyne still own considerable areas within their towns, although the income is effectively given to support charitable objects. The Local Government Act 1972 specifically preserved freemen's rights. The Local Democracy, Economic Development and Construction Act 2009 removed any restrictions entitling only men to be freemen.

Today, the grant of honorary freedom in the United Kingdom is governed by the Local Government Act 1972 (as amended by the Local Democracy, Economic Development and Construction Act 2009). The 1972 Act enabled the councils of cities, royal boroughs, boroughs, and parishes (or, in Wales, communities) with the status of a royal town to confer the status of honorary freeman on "persons of distinction and persons who have, in the opinion of the council, rendered eminent services" to the local area. The 2009 Act extends the ability to grant the status of honorary freeman to any county, city, district, borough, town, parish or community council (so removing the requirement for the town to have 'royal' status, and also enabling county councils to confer the honour). A special meeting of the council can grant the honour by passing a resolution with a two-thirds majority.

The exact qualifications for borough freedom differ between each city or town, but generally fall into two categories, "patrimony" (inheritance) and "servitude" (apprenticeship). For example, in Chester, only the children or grandchildren of freemen may apply for admission. In York, this extends to great- and great-great-grandchildren, and apprenticeship to a freeman of the city will also allow admission. In Great Grimsby, the widow of a freeman passes his rights to her second husband, who retains the privilege after either divorce from or death of the widow. The borough freedom is strongest in York, Chester, Newcastle upon Tyne and Coventry; in Coventry, freedom is qualified by having served an apprenticeship. Durham and Northampton have extended their admission criteria to those who have served an apprenticeship without being "bound" (trained) by a freeman directly. Freemen of Newcastle upon Tyne are bestowed the right to graze cattle on the town moor.

==== Freedom of the City of Belfast ====
Recipients of this honour have included athlete Mary Peters, actor Kenneth Branagh, diplomat John Jordan, industrialist Andrew Carnegie, shipowner Thomas Henry Ismay and Prime Minister Winston Churchill.

==== Freedom of the City of London ====
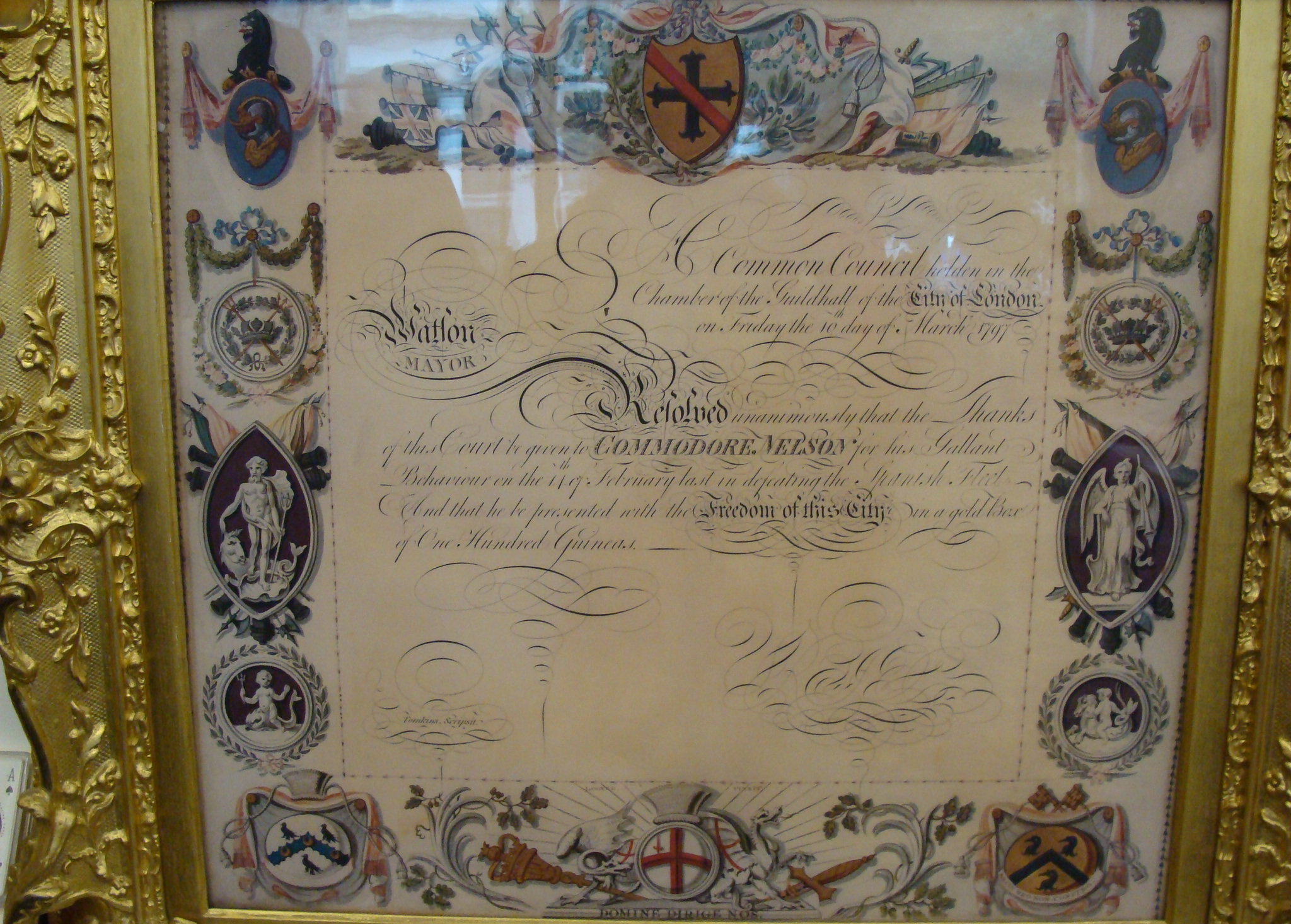
Lord Nelson's certificate given him after becoming a Freeman of the City of London showing that he has Freedom

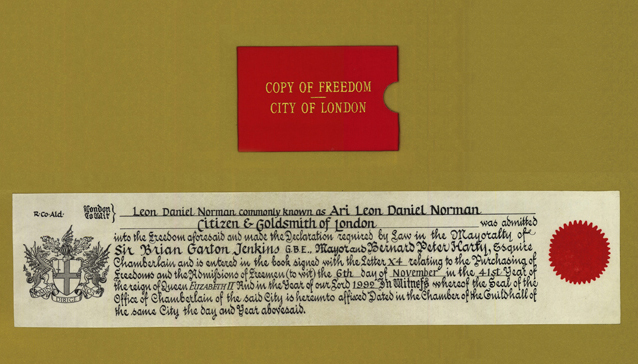
Ari Norman's Certificate of Freedom of the City of London

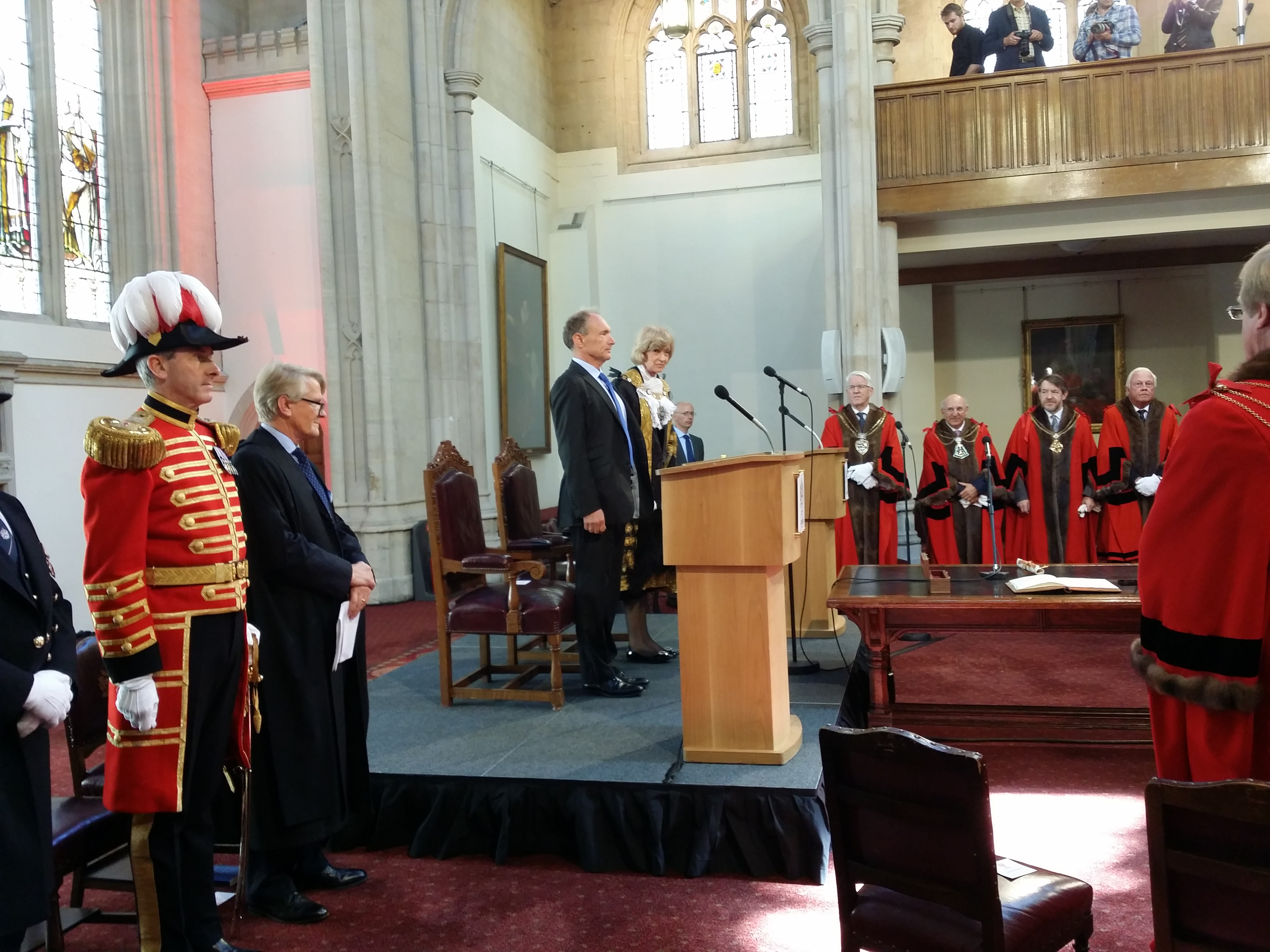
Sir Tim Berners-Lee receiving the freedom of the City of London in 2014

In England, the most established borough freedom is that conferred by the Freedom of the City of London, first recorded in 1237. This is closely tied to the role and status of the livery companies. From 1835, the freedom "without the intervention of a Livery Company" has been bestowed by a general resolution of Common Council, by "redemption" (purchase), at one time for an onerous sum. Now the Freedom can be obtained by servitude, by patrimony, by nomination, or by presentation via a Livery Company. Freedom through nomination by two sponsors is available for a fee (known as a "fine") of £170, but is free to those on the electoral roll of the City. New freemen are enrolled in a ceremony in Guildhall, when they receive a guide to conducting their lives in an honourable fashion and a sealed certificate. Freemen's children get admission preference at the City of London Freemen's School.

There are a number of rights traditionally but apocryphally associated with freemen—the right to drive sheep and cattle over London Bridge; to a silken rope, if hanged; to carry a naked sword in public; or that if the City of London Police finds a freeman drunk and incapable, they will bundle him or her into a taxi and send them home rather than throw them into a cell.

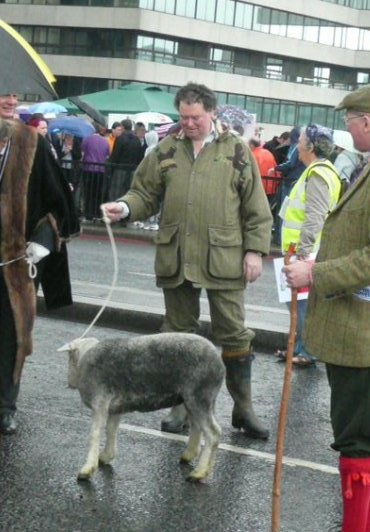
Mark Stephens with a sheep on London Bridge in 2009

While sheep have occasionally been driven over London Bridge by freemen on special occasions, these privileges are now effectively symbolic. The right to herd sheep and cattle across London's four bridges is no longer economically relevant, as there are no livestock markets in the city. Nevertheless, this right has been exercised, or the city has granted permission, on several occasions in modern times:

- On 19 August 1999, Jef Smith, a freeman of London walked two sheep over Tower Bridge to bring attention to the rights of older citizens.
- On 17 June 2006, a flock of about thirty sheep was driven across the Millennium Bridge to mark the start of London Architecture Week.
- On 31 August 2008, Amanda Cottrell, former High Sheriff of Kent, marched six rams across London Bridge to promote fundraising for the restoration of Canterbury Cathedral and "a scheme backing local food production".

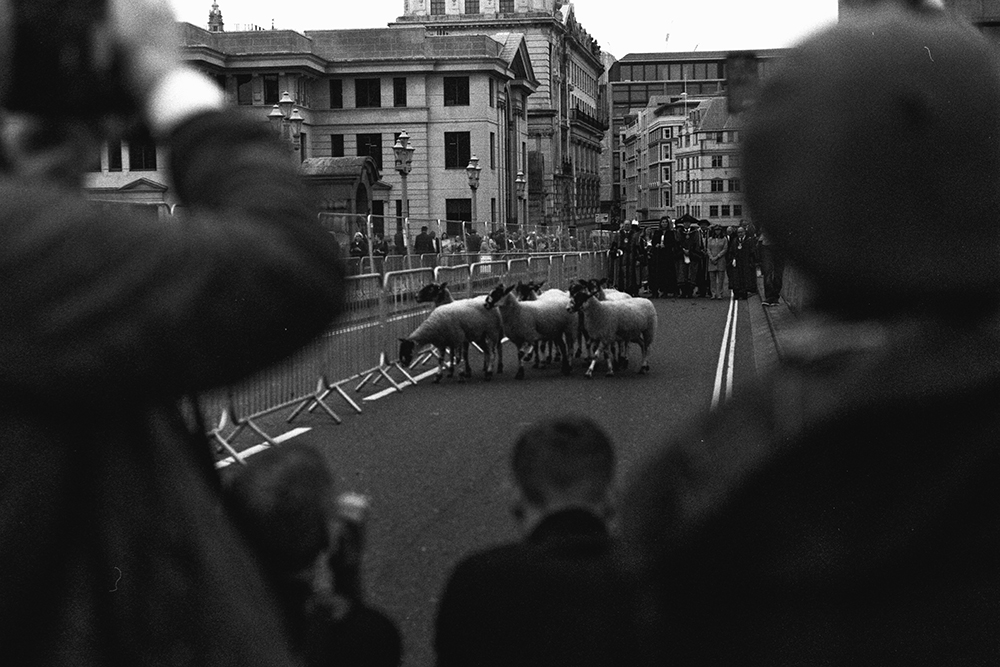
A small number of sheep are herded across Southwark Bridge by the Lord Mayor and Yorkshire Shepherdess among others, London 2021.

- On 17 September 2008, the Lord Mayor of London, David Lewis, and some 500 freemen drove a flock of Romney ewes in relay across London Bridge to raise funds for the Lord Mayor's charities (Orbis and Wellbeing of Women).
- On 7 April 2013, actor and presenter Stephen Fry drove Grace, a year-old lamb, over London Bridge for a documentary about becoming a freeman, Stephen Fry's Key To The City.
- On 27 April 2019, freeman of the city Simone Lakmaker drove Mark, a ram from Spitalfields City Farm, over London Bridge as part of her 80th birthday celebrations and to raise awareness for her charity the Speaking Out Forum.

By 2015, the driving of sheep across the bridge had become an annual event, organised by the Worshipful Company of Woolmen livery company, typically to raise funds for the Lord Mayor's Appeal and the Worshipful Company of Woolmen.

==== Freedom of the City of York ====
York has a long history of freemen dating back to the Anglo-Saxon period, with records dating back to 1272. Freemen may claim their rights through patronage (as far back as their great-great-grandparent, there are records of women being admitted in York in medieval times, a right forgotten for a time until the late 1970s when the gild carried out research and rediscovered it) or apprenticeship. Once sworn in, freemen can join the Gild (archaic spelling used) of Freemen who continue to take an interest in the affairs of the city. New admissions are made every year (usually October) following an admission ceremony with the Lord Mayor at the Guildhall. Prince Andrew, Duke of York, was given the honour in 1986, but a councillors' vote stripped him of the title after allegations of sexual abuse became public.

=== Republic of Ireland ===
In Ireland, borough freedom of the city is generally given to noted foreign and national dignitaries and the list rarely exceeds a few dozen. As in the United Kingdom, the title generally comes with various ancient privileges – for instance, freemen of Dublin are allowed the right to vote in certain elections, bring goods for sale in the city without customs and the right to pasture sheep on common ground such as College Green and St. Stephen's Green.

=== Canada ===
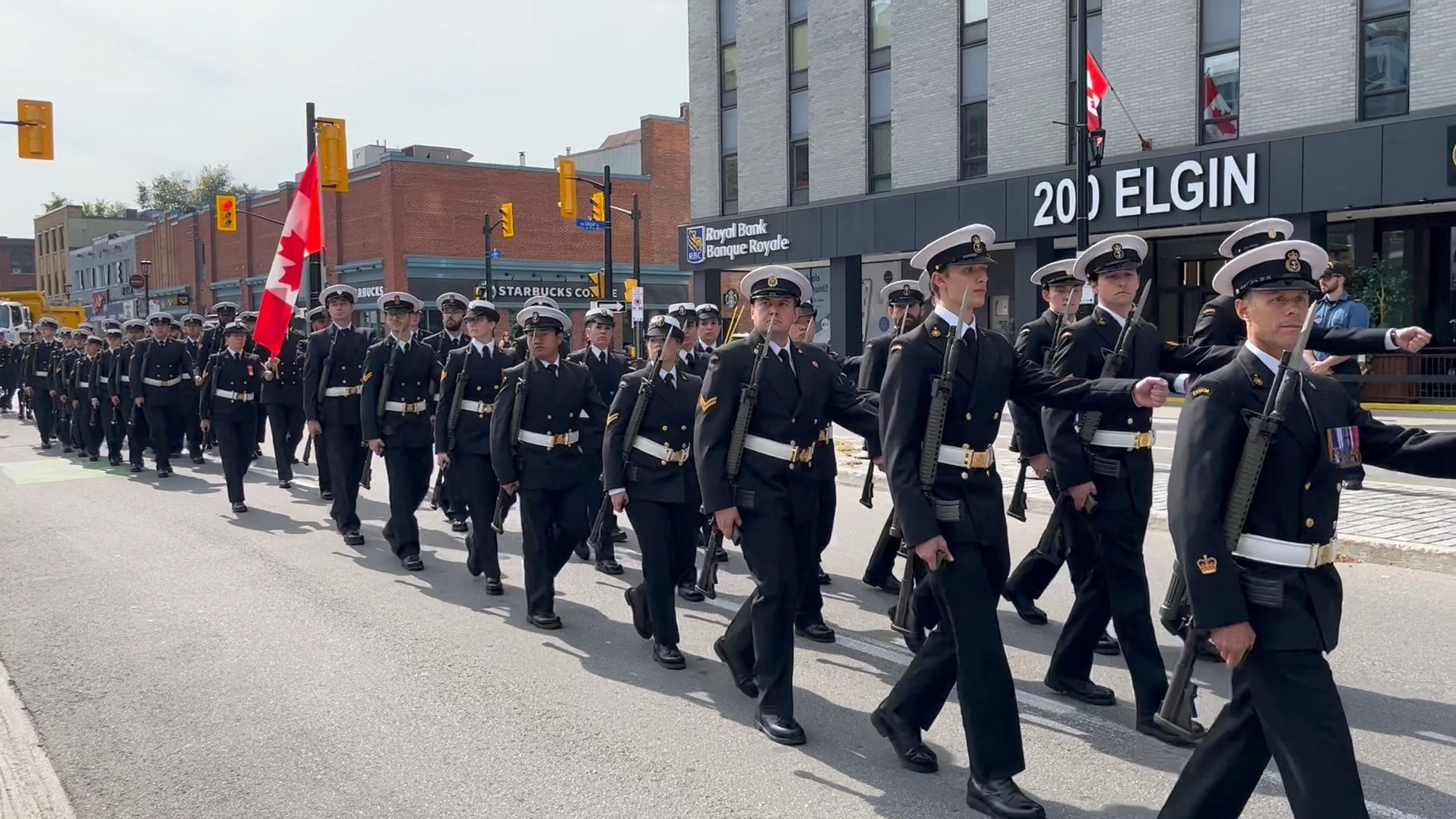
Ship's company of HMCS Carleton exercising Freedom of the City of Ottawa

Freedom of the City is a privilege bestowed to individual units of the Canadian Forces. Many units exercise this privilege in conjunction with significant annual commemorations. The Calgary Highlanders (10th Canadians) commemorate the Battle of Kitcheners' Wood with an annual freedom of the city parade.

== Key to the city ==
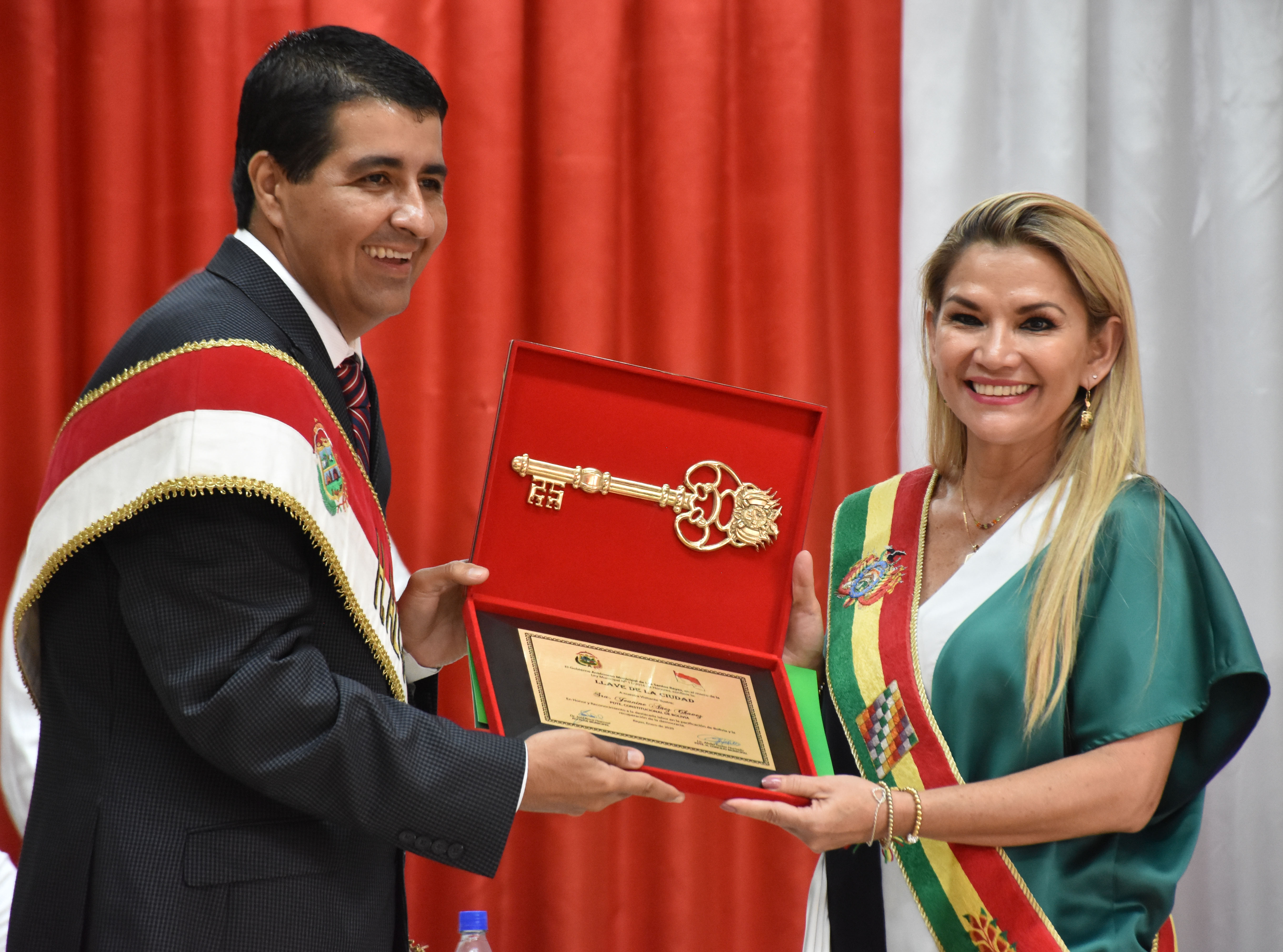
Then Bolivian President Jeanine Áñez receives the key to the city of Reyes.

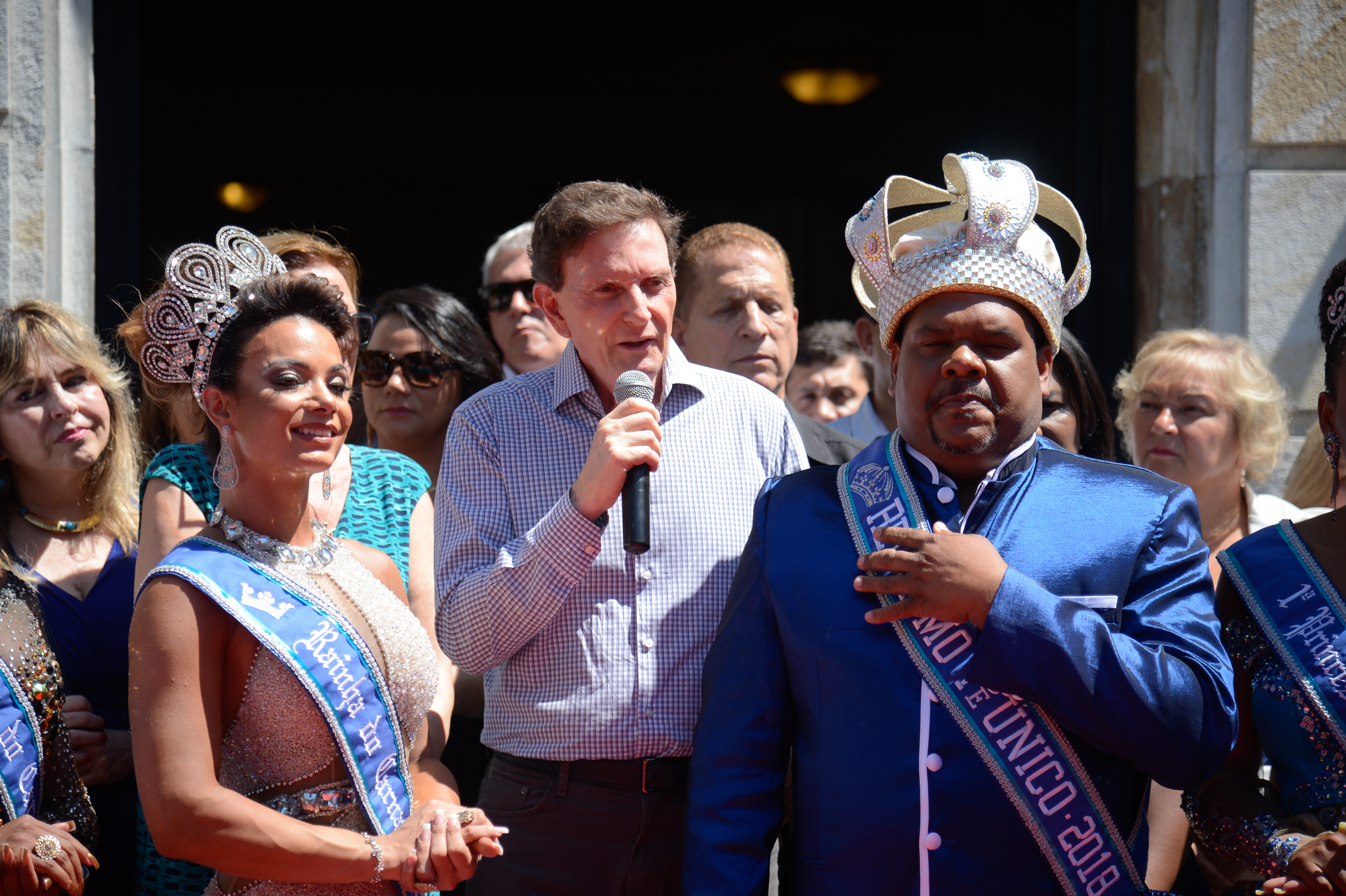
Then Mayor of Rio de Janeiro Marcelo Crivella hands out key to the city to King Momo at the start of Carnival 2018.

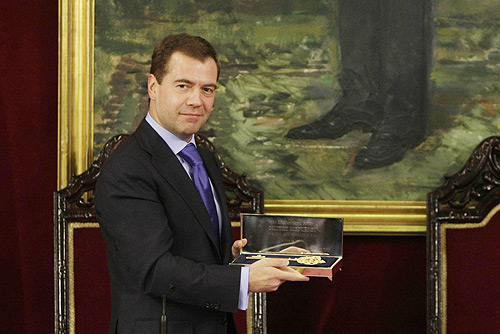
Then Russian President Dmitry Medvedev receives the Golden Key to the City of Madrid during a state visit.

In some countries, such as the United States, an ornamental key – the "key to the city" – is presented to esteemed visitors, residents, or others whom the city wishes to honour. This practice is a variation on the freedom of the city tradition, and has a similar symbolic meaning; evoking medieval walled cities, the gates of which would be guarded during the day and locked at night, the key symbolises the freedom of the recipient to enter and leave the city at will, as a trusted friend of city residents.

In some cities in the Netherlands, Belgium, and Germany, the key to the city is given to the so-called 'prins carnaval' who leads the carnivals which take place the week prior to Septuagesima. The tradition is that the mayor steps down for this period and power is transferred to the prince carnival, who then returns the key at the end of Shrove Tuesday / Mardi Gras. Today, the handing over of the key is mostly symbolic and marks the start and end of the carnival.

A similar tradition exists in some festivities in Latin America (like in Rio Carnival), where the festival's King Momo receives the key to the city at the start of the festivities.

As part of the yearly Gasparilla Pirate Festival in Tampa, Florida a friendly invasion by the crew of the mythical pirate José Gaspar is recreated where costumed pirates make their way to the Tampa Convention Center and they demand that the mayor surrender the key to the city in a playful ceremony.

In Canada, major cities including Toronto, Vancouver, and Montreal may award a key to the city to influential business leaders, musicians, and political leaders. In 2016, the Canadian recording artist Drake received a key to the city of Toronto, presented by the mayor John Tory. In a local tradition, Calgary has opted to award esteemed visitors a symbolic cowboy hat instead of a key; this is usually followed by reciting one of two oaths (one formal, the other more silly) to become honorary Calgarians.

== Military privilege ==
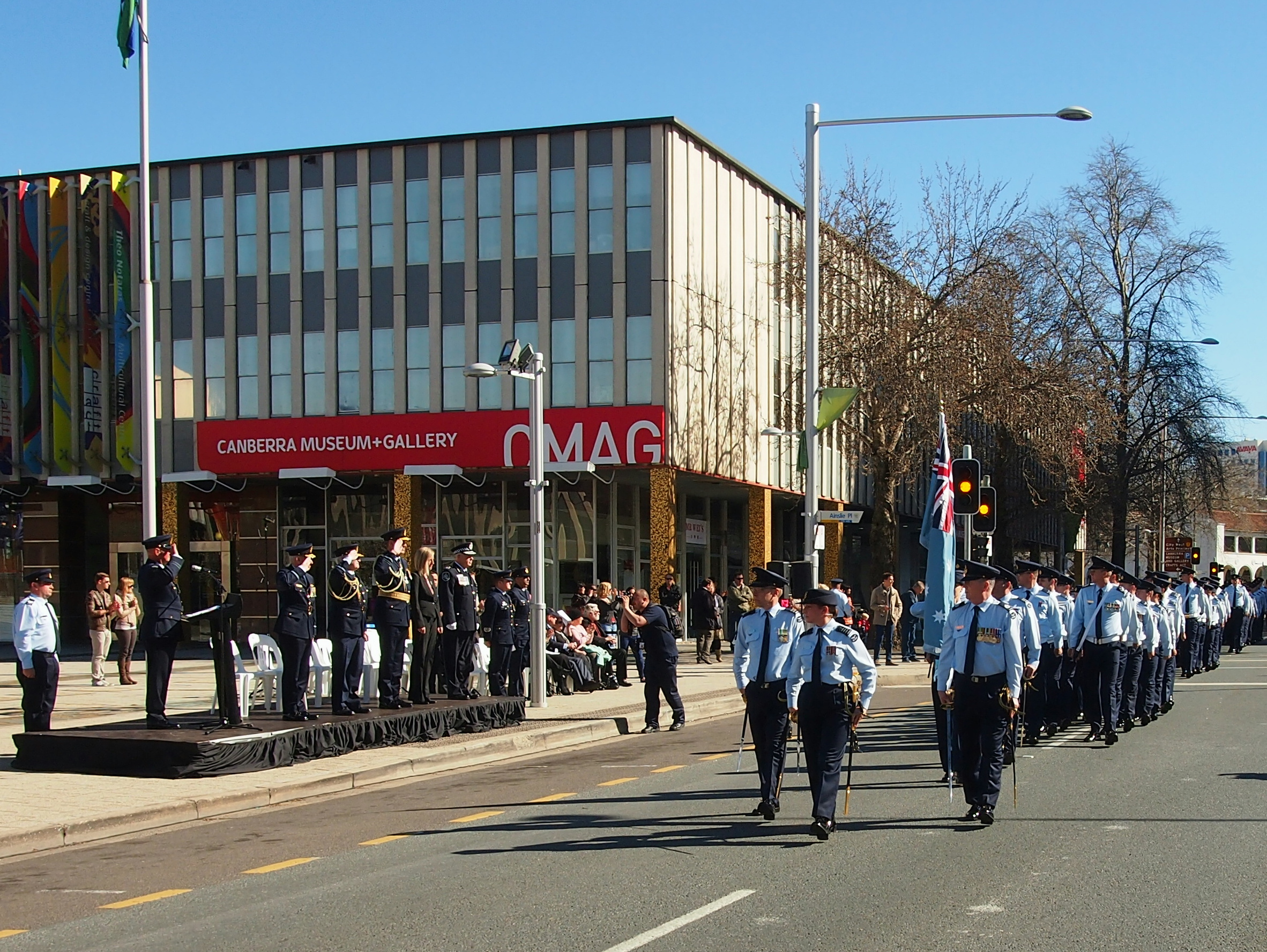
Members of No. 28 Squadron RAAF marching through the centre of Canberra during the unit's Freedom of the City parade in August 2013

Freedom of the City is an ancient honour granted to martial organisations, allowing them the privilege to march into the city "with drums beating, colours flying, and bayonets fixed".

This honour dates back to ancient Rome which regarded the "pomerium", the boundary of the city, as sacred. Promagistrates and generals were forbidden from entering it, and resigned their imperium immediately upon crossing it. An exception was made for victory celebrations (called triumphs), during which the victorious general would be permitted to enter for one day only. Under the Republic, soldiers also lost their status when entering, becoming citizens: thus soldiers at their general's triumph wore civilian dress. Weapons were also banned inside the pomerium for religious and traditional reasons. (The assassination of Julius Caesar occurred outside this boundary.)

Similar laws were passed by other European cities throughout the Medieval era, to protect public security and civic rights, even against their own king's troops. As a result, soldiers would be forced to camp outside the walls of the city during the winter months. The Freedom of the City was an honour granted only to troops which had earned the trust of the local populace, either through some valiant action or simply by being a familiar presence.

Today, martial freedom of the city is an entirely ceremonial honour, usually bestowed upon a unit with historic ties to the area, as a token of appreciation for their long and dedicated service. The awarding of the Freedom is often accompanied by a celebratory parade through the city.

== See also ==
- Honorary citizenship
- List of Freedom of the City recipients (military)
