= Arrieta (disambiguation) =

Arrieta is a municipality in the province of Biscay, Basque Country.

Arrieta can also refer to:

== Places ==
- Arrieta, Lanzarote, seaside village in the north of Lanzarote, Canary Islands

== People ==
- Agustín Arrieta (1803–1874), Mexican painter
- Cristian Arrieta (born 1979), U.S. American footballer
- Danilo Arrieta (born 1987), Danish footballer
- Domingo Arrieta León (1874–1962), Mexican general and statesman
- Elizabeth Arrieta (1960–2019), Uruguayan politician and engineer
- Emilio Arrieta (1823–1894), Spanish composer
- Igor Arrieta (born 2002), Spanish cyclist, son of Jose Luis Arrieta
- Jairo Arrieta (born 1983), Costa Rican footballer
- Jake Arrieta (born 1986), Major League Baseball pitcher
- Johana Arrieta (born 1998), Colombian track athlete
- Jose Luis Arrieta (born 1971), Spanish cyclist
- Joxe Austin Arrieta (born 1949), Spanish Basque writer and translator
- Luis Arrieta (actor) (born 1982), Mexican actor and filmmaker
- Maribel Arrieta (1934–1989), Salvadoran beauty queen, diplomat and artist
- Raymond Arrieta (born 1965), Puerto Rican entertainer and philanthropist
- Santiago Arrieta (1897–1975), Uruguayan actor
- Yolanda Arrieta (born 1963), Spanish Basque writer

== See also ==
- Arietta (disambiguation)
