= Jaakko Kaurinkoski =

Finnish diplomat and journalist

Jaakko Erik Kaurinkoski (25 July 1934 Koijärvi – 25 July 1998 Budapest) was a Finnish diplomat and journalist. He worked in Uusi Suomi newspaper since 1958 and moved from the press to the Ministry of Foreign Affairs in 1977. In October 1991 Kaurinkoski became Finland's first post-war ambassador to Estonia. In 1996, he became Ambassador to Hungary.

Kaurinkoski was born into a clergy family in the municipality of Koijärvi. He graduated from the Helsinki Finnish School in 1953 and graduated from the University of Helsinki in 1959 as a Bachelor of Political Science. After working for a one year at the Lehtikuva photo agency, he moved to the Uusi Suomi newspaper in 1958, first as a foreign editor and then as a Moscow correspondent from 1963 to 1969. After returning to Helsinki, he served as the head of the Foreign Affairs Department of the magazine from 1970 to 1972.

From 1972 to 1977, Kaurinkoski worked as a correspondent for the Nordic news agencies in Beijing, after which he became the Press Counselor in Stockholm and in 1982 to the Embassy of Finland in Washington. He was appointed Consul General in Leningrad in 1985. In 1990, he returned as a consultative official to the Ministry for Foreign Affairs until he was appointed ambassador in Tallinn and then Budapest.

Throughout his life, Kaurinkoski also translated to and from Finnish and English. He married comic book writer Kaarina Kaurinkoski (née Rakkolainen) in 1967. They stayed together until his death.
