= María Teodora Arrieta =

Mexican politician (born 1955)

- Born: 7 January 1955 (age 71); State of Mexico, Mexico
- Occupation: Politician
- Political party: PRI

María Teodora Elba Arrieta Pérez (Note: In this Mexican name, the surname is Arrieta and the second or maternal family name is Pérez.) (born 7 January 1955) is a Mexican politician from the Institutional Revolutionary Party (PRI). From 2000 to 2003 she served as a deputy during the 58th Congress, representing the State of Mexico.
