= Aaken ja Sakun kesäkeittiö =

Finnish cooking television series

Aaken ja Sakun kesäkeittiö (Aake and Saku's summer kitchen) is a 1999 Finnish cookery television series that was shown on Sundays during the summer of 1999. It first aired on June 20, 1999, on MTV3 and lasted one season.

The series was written and directed by Ari Lohenoja and was presented by Aake Kalliala and Sakari Kuosmanen.

== Episodes ==
- Episode 1: Paratiisi (Paradise, June 20)
- Episode 2: Saat miehen kyyneliin (You bring tears to a man's eyes, June 27)
- Episode 3: Seksi vie ja taksi tuo (Sex takes and taxi brings, July 4)
- Episode 4: Suomen parhaat ravivihjeet (Finland's best horse racing tips, July 11)
- Episode 5: Rapurallia riijanratkasijalla (Crab rally on the quarrel settler, July 18)
- Episode 6: Direktiivien mukaista lahjontaa (Bribery according to the directives, July 25)
- Episode 7: Hirvee vai ei? (Moose or no?, August 1)
- Episode 8: Omenia ja muikkukukkoa (Apples and muikkukukko, August 8)
