= Aristobulus =

Aristobulus or Aristoboulos may refer to:

- Aristobulus I (died 103 BC), king of the Hebrew Hasmonean Dynasty, 104–103 BC
- Aristobulus II (died 49 BC), king of Judea from the Hasmonean Dynasty, 67–63 BC
- Aristobulus III of Judea (53 BC–36 BC), last scion of the Hasmonean royal house
- Aristobulus IV (31 BC–7 BC), Prince of Judea, son of Herod the Great and Mariamne, nephew of Aristobulus III, married Berenice, father of Agrippa I
- Aristobulus Minor, son of the above, brother of Agrippa I
- Aristobulus of Chalcis, first-century ruler, known as the Tetrarch of Chalcis and later King of Armenia Minor
- Aristobulus of Alexandria (c. 160 BC), Hellenistic Jewish philosopher
- Aristobulus (fl. 4th century BCE), father of the youth Aristion who lived in the home of Demosthenes, and may be the same person as Aristophilus.
- Aristobulus of Cassandreia (375 BC–301 BC), Greek historian and engineer, accompanied Alexander the Great on his campaigns
- Aristobulus of Britannia, one of the Seventy Disciples, brother of Barnabas
- Aristobulus of Alexandria, one of 72 priests who translated the Torah into the Greek
- Aristobulus, brother to the philosopher Epicurus, and the eponymous subject of one of his works
- Aristobulus, a painter referred to by Pliny with the epithet "Syrus" (which the scholar Karl Julius Sillig understood to indicate his origin on the island of Syros), about whom little else is known
