= Arietta =

Arietta may refer to:

- a short aria
- Arietta, New York, a town
- SS Arietta, a cargo ship
- USS Arletta (1860), a Union Navy schooner during the American Civil War

== See also ==
- Arrieta (disambiguation)
