= Eeva Jalavisto =

Finnish physiologist (1909–1966)

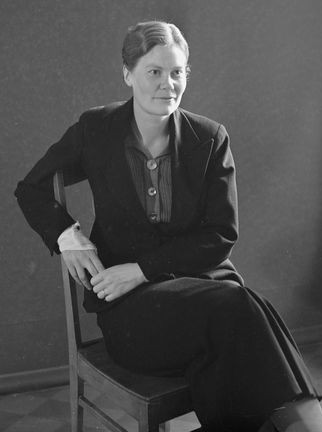
- Jalavisto in 1937
- Born: Eeva Ottilia Elmgren; 21 March 1909; Kerimäki, Grand Duchy of Finland
- Died: 12 June 1966 (aged 57); Helsinki, Finland
- Education: Doctor of Medicine and Surgery
- Alma mater: University of Helsinki
- Occupation: Physiologist

Eeva Jalavisto (until 1934 Elmgren; (Note: It was common in the late 19th and early 20th centuries to 'Finnicise' non-Finnish surnames.) 21 March 1909 – 12 June 1966) was a Finnish Professor of physiology and an influential researcher and policy maker in the areas of health and social care of the elderly as well as wider gerontology.

== Early life and education ==
Born in Kerimäki to Chief Physician Dr Robert Elmgren and Ines née Meurman, Eeva Elmgren completed her secondary education at the Helsingin Suomalainen Yhteiskoulu, graduating in 1927.

She then followed her father into medicine, graduating from University of Helsinki medical school as early as in 1931, and going on to obtain her Licentiate as well as Doctorate in medicine and surgery in 1937.

== Career ==
Jalavisto worked at the University of Helsinki Institute of Physiology from 1933, reaching the rank of Docent in 1941, and that of Professor in 1947.

She was a board member of the Finnish Medical Society, Duodecim, from 1947 to 1950.

She was also active in physiology and gerontology associations, serving as a co-founder, secretary and later chair of the Finnish Society of Gerontology (Societas Gerontologica Fennica), board member of the International Association of Gerontology and Geriatrics, and member of the Nordic Gerontology Association.

From 1949 to 1953, Jalavisto chaired the Finnish Association for the Welfare of Older People.

She undertook research visits to Sweden, Germany, the United Kingdom and the US from the late 1930s to the early 1950s.

Together with her fellow physiologist Eva Bonsdorff, she named erythropoietin (also known as EPO).

== Death ==
Eeva Jalavisto died following a protracted illness, aged 57.
