= Big High =

American rock band

- Origin: Seattle, WA
- Genres: Rock
- Labels: Big High Music
- Members: Mesa a.k.a. Robert Owen, Sandy, Ari
- Past members: Steven Barci, Barrett Martin
- Website: www.bighighmusic.com

Big High is an American rock band formed in Seattle, Washington in 2008 by vocalist Mesa and guitarist Ari Joshua, most noted as the guitarist for Arisawkadoria. On bass there is William "Sandy" Dickerson, and on drums there is Barrett Martin. The band recorded one untitled demo at London bridge studio before original drummer Steven Barci left the band to tour with Manx guitarist Davy Knowles and The Back Door Slam. Barrett Martin of Screaming Trees and Mad Season fame joined the band in late 2009 and quickly began recording a self-titled debut album at Seattle's legendary Avast Studios in Ballard Washington. The debut album was released internationally on June 15, 2010 through Burnside Distribution in Portland, Oregon.

== Discography ==
- Big High EP Big High (2008)
- Sound vs Silence Vol. 2 Compilation CD (2008)
- Big High Big High (2010)

=== Track listing ===
1. "Cold Dark Garden"
2. "LSH"
3. "Atoms In Formation"
4. "Right Brain"
5. "Whisper" ^^
6. "Symptoms of the Sun" ^^
7. "Moksha"
8. "Blacks and Blues" ^^
9. "Chemicals"
10. "Truck Stop"
11. "Angel Devil"
12. "Could She Be" ^^
13. "Possessions"

^^ featuring Peter Buck of R.E.M.
