= Ari Norman =

British designer and manufacturer

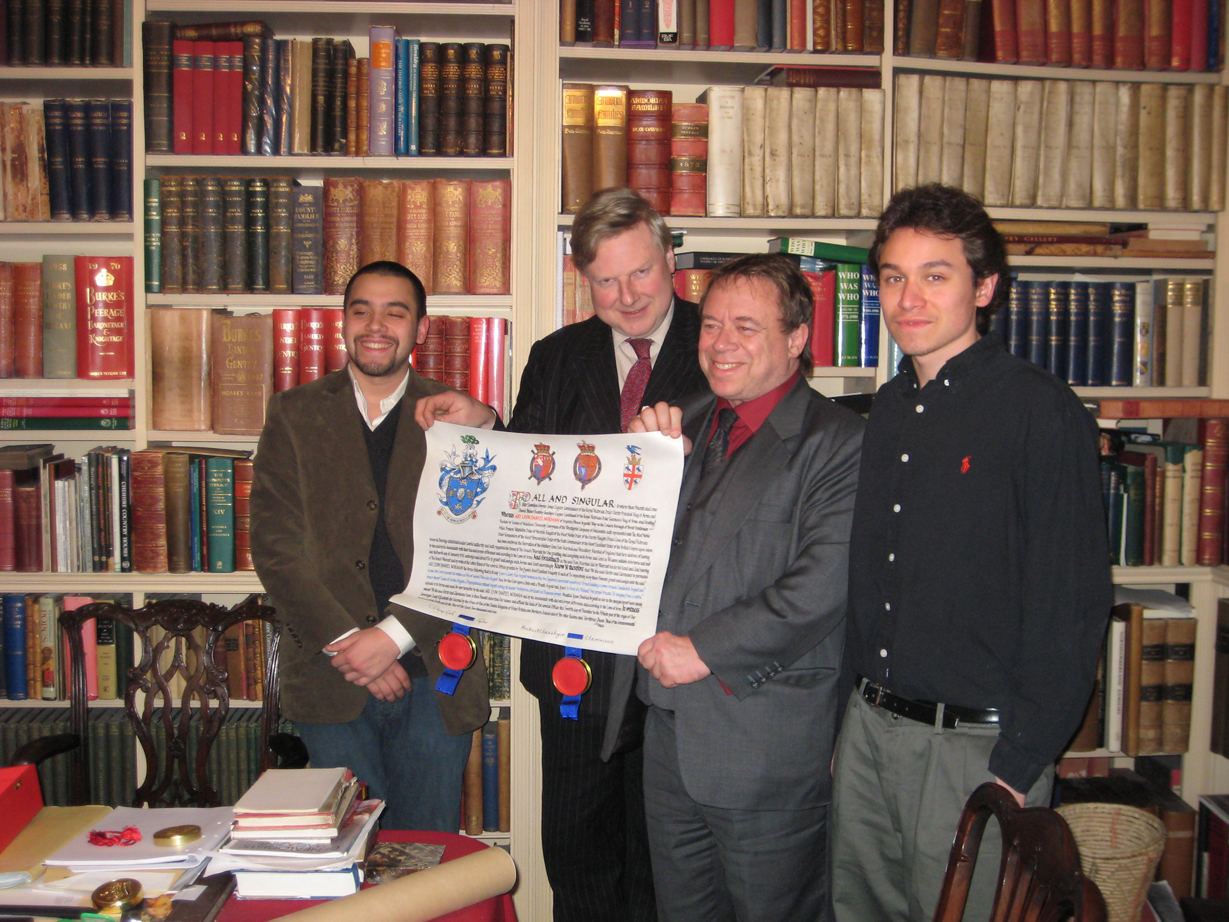
Ari Norman with sons Lee (L) and Adam (R) being presented with the patent for his family coat of arms by Thomas Woodcock, Norroy and Ulster King of Arms at the College of Arms

Ari Daniel Norman is a British designer and manufacturer of traditional and modern sterling silver jewellery and gifts. Norman is the founder and director of Ari D Norman Ltd, international supplier of sterling silver designs to the trade and consumer market, and creator of the Ari D Norman brand.

Norman was the first and only silversmith to win the Queen's Award for Export Achievement in 1989 and was awarded Freedom of the City of London in 1992 for services rendered to the British Silver industry.

He currently lives and works in North West London with his two sons, Lee and Adam.

== Early life ==
Ari Norman's paternal grandfather, Leibish Nussbaum, a Polish diamond cleaver was arrested in Marmande in the Southern French region of Lot-et-Garonne in 1942, where he and his wife were in hiding during WWII and taken via Drancy to the concentration camp Auschwitz where he was killed as part of the Holocaust. Some of his other family went into hiding in Lot-et-Garonne, including his grandmother Perla, his aunt Laura and her husband Nathan. They were hidden by a Resistance member, called Lucienne Deguilhem, who had a large house in Monbahus. Norman's cousin Jacques was born during this time in hiding. Norman's father, Shabse Nussbaum (later Sydney Norman), escaped the Holocaust by boarding a ship he thought was headed for the South of France only to discover he was headed for England. There he stayed, married Phillys Larkham who had originally taken him in as a Belgian refugee, and continued to work in the diamond industry for many years. In 1956, with his mother and four older sisters, Ari Norman went to live in Liberia, aged nine, with two pet chimps, a pygmy deer and a couple of pygmy hippos, whilst his father pursued his passion for discovering diamonds in West Africa. His father had an eventual breakthrough and was one of the first people to help discover diamonds in the rivers and jungles of Liberia. He was honoured by the Liberian President Tubman in the 1960s.

Having studied to become a Civil Engineer, Norman returned to Liberia in his 20s to help build roads and bridges for his father's expanding diamond mine but chose not to focus on Civil Engineering as a career path. Instead he travelled across North and South America through his 20s and 30s. His father's diamond mine became unworkable due to its location in such an unstable region and he sold it on, only to be given it back for free a few years later.

In May 2014, Lucienne Deguilhem was posthumously awarded ‘Just Amongst Nations’ by Yad Vashem, World centre for Holocaust research, to coincide with the first National Day of Resistance in France.

== Career ==
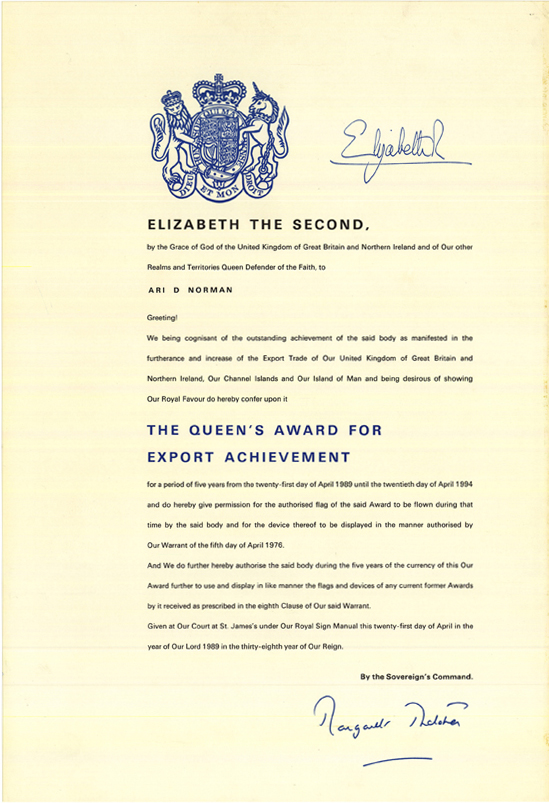
Queen's Award for Export Achievement Certificate

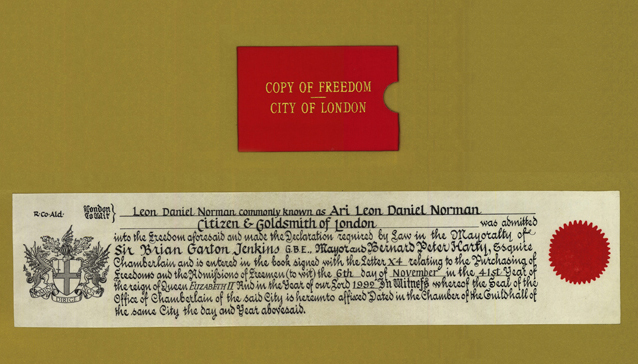
Certificate of the Freedom of the City of London

Ari Norman had decided that wherever he travelled in the world, he would pick up local craft samples and send them back home. As Norman was on his world travels, he collected a wide range of items including ethnic jewellery and clothing and shipped them all home. Once back in London, Norman and his father decided to offer these unique items for sale to retailers in the West End and around the King's Road. Mexican Silver proved to be the most popular. Norman sold every sample he had shipped home and received future orders for items he didn't have. He returned to Mexico where he had found the silver pieces and his business took off. Norman originally bought from retailers in Mexico City but soon moved onto the town of Taxco where the silver craftsmen were based and he could buy from them wholesale. International Jewellery and Crafts was officially born in 1974, run from Norman's parents’ house in Willesden, London and would become Ari D Norman Ltd in 1976.

Norman initially bought silver jewellery and gift items from Mexican artisans in order to sell directly onto retailers. He then started to design his own work, at first adapting and modify pieces, later creating more and more original pieces until Norman eventually developed his own antique style that would become globally heralded and often copied. Norman took great interest in the Art Nouveau and Art Deco movements and began to design jewellery that reflected these styles. He then drew inspiration from further back in time and would design items heavily influenced by the Victorian art era. These were considered the 'antiques of tomorrow' and drew influence from artists such as Charles Rennie Mackintosh, William Morris, Georges Fouquet, Victor Horta, Rene Lalique and Alphonse Mucha.

Norman and his father began to attend trade exhibitions throughout the United Kingdom, branching out to major European exhibitions followed by residencies in North American and Far Eastern trade exhibitions. The Ari D Norman brand grew its global identity throughout the 1980s and 1990s with Norman often attending around 36 international exhibitions a year and exporting to 80 countries. Ari claimed the world record for participating in the most trade exhibitions worldwide. Ari D Norman revived an interest in small sterling silver accessories such as perfume bottles, thimbles, snuffboxes and collectable pillboxes.

Norman moved the business from his parents’ house to an office building in Northwest London called Argenta House. He managed to campaign the council for a name change of the local road where the office was situated and it was renamed Argenta Way.

Ari D Norman Ltd became 'the brand behind the brand'. Norman was commissioned to create work for many large brands including Parker Pens, The Orient Express and Wedgwood. For Parker Pens, he created a new version of their classic Snake Pen which is now a collector's item.

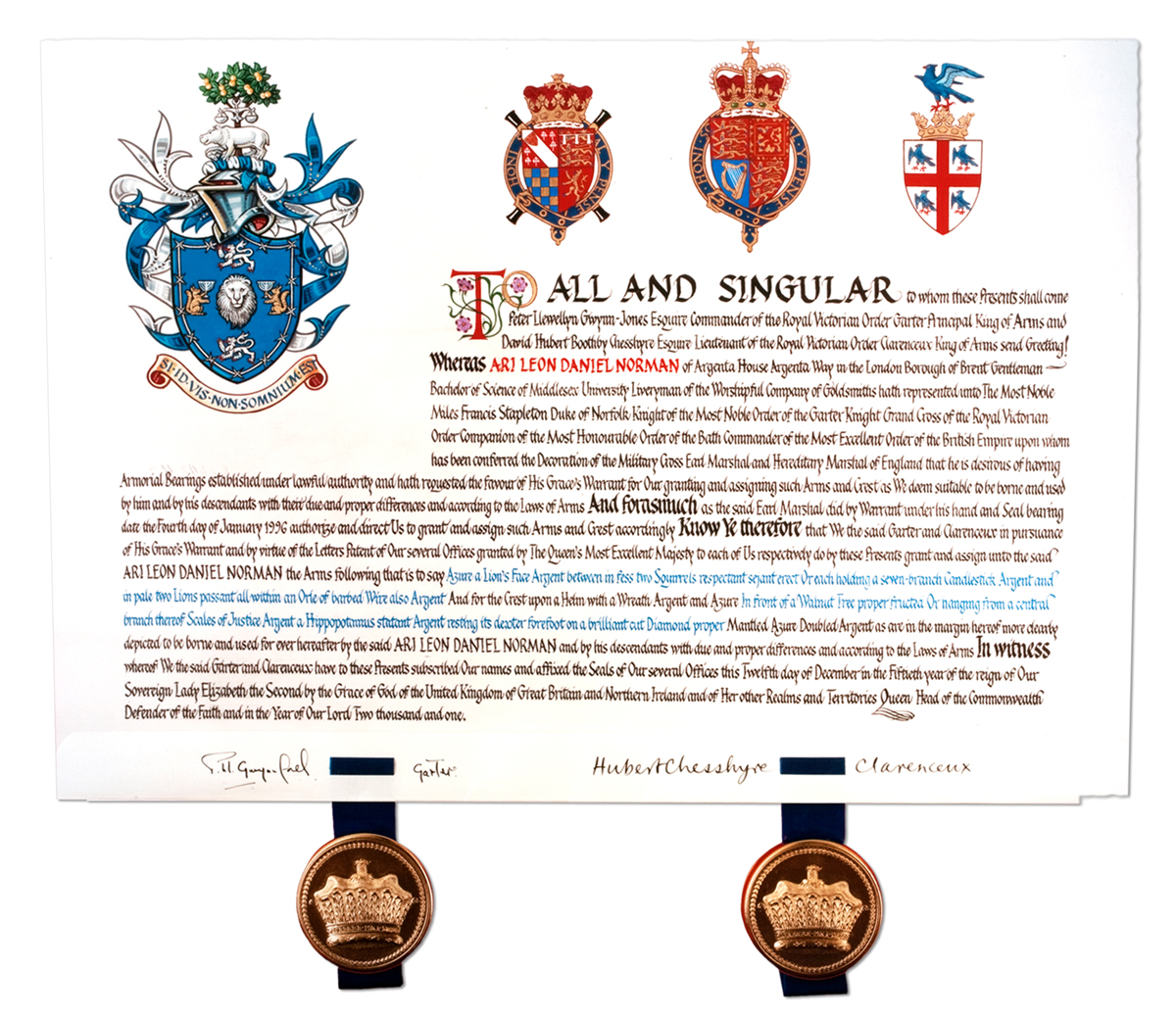
Certificate from the College of Arms for Ari Norman familial coat of arms

In recognition of his international work, Norman was awarded the Queens Award for Export Achievement in 1989 and was invited to Buckingham Palace. He was unable to attend this event as he was exhibiting abroad but sent his mother along instead. In 1992, he was invited to join the Worshipful Guild of Goldsmiths in recognition of his services to the silver industry and his promotion of the hallmarking system, and was awarded the Freedom of the City of London. Following these awards, Norman was given the right to apply for his own family coat of arms. Norman spent a number of years designing the coat of arms and created a collection of personal familial symbols as part of the coat of arms that would represent his family name over the coming generations. This was presented to Norman by the Royal College of Arms in 1996.

Ari Norman has long been an advocate for the hallmarking system and has promoted the system globally. Norman travelled the world explaining the hallmarking system so that clients could understand the craftsmanship and quality that a hallmark signifies. The system is the oldest form of consumer protection in existence. All the silver produced by Ari D Norman Ltd bears the full British Hallmark with the exception of pieces too small or too delicate to bear it, in which case they are marked 925. When Ari D Norman Ltd became the first British silversmith to receive the Queen's Award for Export Achievement, to recognise the achievement and the fact that Ari Norman had been one of the most vocal advocates of the system globally, the Queen's Award Mark was applied as an additional hallmark to their silver items. This hallmark is unique to Ari D Norman and can be found in Bradbury's book of Hallmarks.

In 2012, Norman commissioned a series of urban art murals to be painted by a local artist, Abe Sesay, across the facade of their headquarters in London depicting a number of race issues from the Olympic Games including the members of the Israeli Olympic team who were murdered at the 1972 Munich Olympics, Tommie Smith and John Carlos who stood for the Black Power movement at the 1968 Olympics and sprinter Jesse Owens who raced at the 1936 Olympics.

Ari Norman continues to develop the Ari D Norman brand across the globe and most recently created a new fashion jewellery brand called JewelAri.

== Personal life ==
Norman cites his grandfather's murder at the hands of the Nazis in Auschwitz as a major influence on his actions and character and continues to have a ‘holocaust’ mentality, where nothing in one's life should be taken for granted. "I was brought up by a father who was gravely affected by the Holocaust, because his own father was murdered at Auschwitz. I learned the hard way that you have to stand up and be counted, not be scared to show that you're Jewish, and be ready to fight for your independence."

Norman was originally born Leon Norman but officially changed his name as a teenager to Ari to reflect his Jewish heritage. The name Ari is the equivalent Hebrew version of Leon and means Lion. Politically active and a keen traveller, Norman travelled across Europe aged 16 with a friend intending to emigrate to Israel. However, when they reached Italy they were detained by Interpol and sent home by the British consulate, because Norman's friend had not told his parents where they were going. Norman volunteered during the Israeli Six-Day War of 1967 when many of his friends and family were travelling in the opposite direction back to the UK to avoid the conflict. In 2010, his thatched house caught fire and he was forced to watch from over the road for the next eight hours as eight fire engines tried to put out the roof blaze.
