= SS Arietta =

Cargo ship

History
- Name: Empire Cranmer (1941–42); Thraki (1942–47); Arietta (1947–60)
- Owner: Ministry of War Transport (1941–42); Greek Government (1942–47); Livanos Maritime Co Ltd (1947–60)
- Operator: Mungo, Campbell & Co Ltd (1941–42); S G Embiricos Ltd (1942–47); Livanos Maritime Co Ltd (1947–60)
- Port of registry: (United Kingdom) Sunderland, UK (1941–42); Greece (1942–60)
- Builder: J L Thompson & Sons Ltd
- Yard number: 710
- Launched: 8 July 1941
- Completed: October 1941
- Maiden voyage: 12 November 1941
- Out of service: 17 March 1961
- Identification: United Kingdom Official Number 168996 (1941–42); Code Letters BCPN (1941–42)
- Fate: Wrecked

General characteristics
- Tonnage: 7,460 GRT; 4,503 NRT
- Length: 423 ft 8 in (129.13 m)
- Beam: 59 ft 9 in (18.21 m)
- Depth: 35 ft 0 in (10.67 m)
- Propulsion: Triple expansion steam engine

Arietta was a 7,460 GRT cargo ship that was built in 1941 as Empire Cranmer by J L Thompson & Sons Ltd, Sunderland, Co Durham, United Kingdom. She was built for the Ministry of War Transport (MoWT). Empire Cranmer was transferred to the Greek Government in 1942 and renamed Thraki. In 1947, she was sold into merchant service and renamed Arietta. On 17 March 1960, she ran aground at Novorossiysk, Soviet Union. Although refloated on 1 April, she was declared a constructive total loss.

== Description ==
The ship was built in 1941 by J L Thompson and Sons Ltd, Sunderland. Yard number 710, she was launched on 8 July and completed in October,

The ship was 423 feet 8 inches (129.13 m) long, with a beam of 59 feet 9 inches (18.21 m). She had a depth of 35 feet 0 inches (10.67 m). She was assessed at 7,460 GRT, 4,503 NRT.

The ship was propelled by a 320 nhp triple expansion steam engine, which had cylinders of 24 inches (61 cm), 39 inches (99 cm) and 68 inches (170 cm) diameter by 48 inches (120 cm) stroke. The engine was built by the North East Marine Engine Co (1938) Ltd, Newcastle upon Tyne.

== History ==
=== Second World War ===
Empire Cranmer was launched on 8 July 1941 and completed in October. and placed under the management of Mungo, Campbell & Co Ltd. The Official Number 168996 and Code Letters BCPN were allocated. Her port of registry was Sunderland. Empire Cranmer made her maiden voyage on 12 November 1941 when she departed the Tyne to join Convoy FN 549, which had departed Southend, Essex the previous day and arrived at Methil, Fife the following day. She departed Methil on 15 November as a member of Convoy EN 6, which arrived at Oban, Argyllshire on 18 November. She was in ballast. Empire Cranmer was a member of Convoy ON 37, which departed from Liverpool, Lancashire on 15 November 1941 and dispersed at sea on 24 November. Empire Cranmer sailed to Baltimore, Ohio, United States, arriving on 10 December. She departed Baltimore on 24 December for Halifax, Nova Scotia, Canada, where she arrived on 28 December. She departed Halifax on 30 December for Sydney, Cape Breton, where she arrived on 31 December.

Empire Cranmer was a member of Convoy SC 63, which departed from Sydney on 3 January 1942 and dispersed at sea on 13 January. She was carrying a cargo of grain bound for the Tyne. She left the convoy for Loch Ewe, arriving on 16 January. At Loch Ewe, she joined Convoy WN 234, which departed on 21 January and arrived at Methil on 23 January. She then joined Convoy FS 711, which departed Methil on 28 January and arrived at Southend on 30 January. She arrived on the Tyne on 28 January.

Empire Cranmer departed from Sunderland on 12 March, joining Convoy FN 652, which had departed from Southend on 11 March and arrived at Methil on 13 March. She then joined Convoy EN 58, which departed Methil that day and arrived at Loch Ewe on 16 March. Empire Cranmer then joined Convoy ON 76, which departed from Liverpool on 15 March and arrived at Halifax on 31 March. Empire Cranmer was a member of Convoy SC 79, which departed from Halifax on 11 April 1942 and arrived at Liverpool, Lancashire on 27 April. She was carrying a cargo of grain and flour bound for Avonmouth, Somerset. Empire Cranmer was carrying one of the convoy's Commodores. She left the convoy at Belfast Lough on 25 April, departing the next day with Convoy BB167, which arrived at Milford Haven, Pembrokeshire on 27 April. She arrived at Avonmouth on 28 April.

After discharging her cargo, Empire Cranmer departed on 3 May for Swansea, Glamorgan, arriving the same day. She departed Swansea on 9 May for Milford Haven, arriving the next day. She departed Milford Haven on 11 May, joining Convoy ON 94, which departed Liverpool on 12 May and arrived at Halifax on 25 May. She was carrying a cargo of coal and was bound for Boston, Massachusetts, United States. She arrived at Boston on 27 May. On 10 June, Empire Cranmer departed Boston with Convoy BX 24, which arrived at Halifax on 12 June. She then joined Convoy HS 13, which departed Halifax on 16 June and arrived at Sydney on 18 June. Empire Cranmer was a member of Convoy SC 88, which departed from Halifax on 19 June 1942 and arrived at Liverpool, on 4 July. She was carrying general cargo bound for Manchester, Lancashire.

Empire Cranmer departed Liverpool on 13 July as a member of Convoy ON 112, which arrived at Cape Cod, Massachusetts on 30 July. She arrived at New York on 1 August, departing the same day for Baltimore, where she arrived on 4 August. Empire Cranmer departed Baltimore on 20 August for New York, arriving on 26 August and leaving the next day for Cape Cod Bay. On 2 September, she departed Cape Cod Bay with Convoy BX 36, which arrived at Halifax on 4 September. She then joined Convoy SC 99, which departed Halifax on 5 September and arrived at Liverpool on 20 September. She was carrying general cargo. Empire Cranmer left the convoy at Loch Ewe on 20 September. She then joined Convoy WN 339, which departed the next day and arrived at Methil on 23 September. She then joined Convoy FS 915, which departed Methil that day and arrived at Southend on 25 September. She left the convoy on 24 September at Hull, Yorkshire.

Empire Cranmer was transferred to the Greek Government and renamed Thraki. She was placed under the management of S G Embiricos Ltd. She departed Hull on 10 October, to join Convoy FN 832, which had departed Southend on 10 October and arrived at Methil on 12 October. She left the convoy at the Tyne, arriving on 12 October. Thraki the joined Convoy 838, which had departed from Southend on 13 October and arrived at Methil on 15 October. She then joined Convoy EN 151, which departed Methil on 17 October and arrived at Oban on 19 October. Thraki then joined Convoy ON 142, which had departed from Liverpool on 30 October and arrived at New York on 21 November. She left the convoy at Halifax on 2 February, departing on 4 February with Convoy HF 34, which arrived at Saint John, New Brunswick, Canada on 21 November. Thraki departed Saint John on 30 November as a member of Convoy FH 18, which arrived at Halifax on 3 December. On 25 February, she departe Halifax to join Convoy SC 112, which departed New York on 4 December and arrived at Liverpool on 25 December. She was carrying a cargo of grain. She left the convoy at Belfast Lough on 24 December, joining convoy BB 248, which departed the next day and arrived at Milford Haven on 26 December. She was bound for Avonmouth, arriving on 27 December.

Thraki departed Avonmouth on 1 January 1943 for Swansea, arriving the next day. She departed Swansea on 9 January for the Belfast Lough, arriving the next day. She joined Convoy ON 160, which departed from Liverpool on 11 January and arrived at New York on 4 February. Thraki was bound for Saint John, She left the convoy on 2 February at Halifax. On 4 February, she joined Convoy HF 34, which arrived at Saint John on 6 February. Thraki departed Saint John on 21 February as a member of Convoy FH 38, which arrived at Halifax on 23 February. On 25 February, she joined Convoy SC 121, which had departed from New York City on 23 February 1943 and arrived at Liverpool on 14 March. She was carrying a cargo of grain bound for Avonmouth. Thraki left the convoy on 13 March at Belfast Lough, joining Convoy BB 268, which departed that day and arrived at Milford Haven on 15 March, the day that Thraki arrived at Avonmouth.

Thraki departed Avonmouth on 23 March for Swansea. She departed Swansea on 2 April for Milford Haven, arriving the next day and departing the day after that to join Convoy ONS 3, which departed from Liverpool on 5 April and arrived at Halifax on 28 April. She was carrying a cargo of coal bound for Saint John. She then joined Convoy HF 51, which departed Halifax on 29 April and arrived at Saint John on 1 May. Thraki departed Saint John on 17 May as a member of Convoy FH 55, which arrived at Halifax on 19 May. She then joined Convoy SC 132, which departed Halifax on 26 May and arrived at Liverpool on 13 June. She was carrying a cargo of grain and fads. She left the convoy on 11 June at Belfast Lough, from where she departed on 17 June for Swansea, arriving the next day.

Thraki departed Swansea on 30 June, arriving the next day at Milford Haven. She departed Milford Haven the next day to join Convoy ONS 12, which departed Liverpool on 3 July and arrived at Halifax on 18 July. She left the convoy on 17 July at Sydney. The next day, she joined Convoy SQ 59, which arrived at Father Point, Quebec on 21 July. On 16 August, Thraki joined Convoy QS 64, which departed from the Red Islet and arrived at Sydney on 19 August. On 22 August, she joined Convoy SC 140, which had departed from Halifax on 21 August and arrived at Liverpool on 5 September. She was carrying a cargo of grain and vehicles. She departed Liverpool on 9 September for Cardiff, Glamorgan, arriving on 13 September.

Thraki departed Cardiff on 22 September, arriving the next day at Milford Haven. She departed Milford Haven two days later to join Convoy KMS 28G, which departed Liverpool on 26 September and arrived at Gibraltar on 7 October. She was carrying a cargo of coal bound for Bône, Algeria. She then joined Convoy KMS 28, which departed from Gibraltar that day and arrived at Port Said, Egypt on 19 October. Thraki arrived at Bône on 11 October. She departed Bône on 24 October, joining Convoy KMS 29, which had departed Gibraltar on 20 October and arrived at Port Said on 31 October. She left the convoy at Bizerta, Algeria the next day. Thraki departed Bizerta on 27 October for Philippeville, arriving on 29 October. She departed Philippeville on 19 November, joining Convoy MKS 30, which had departed from Port Said on 2 November and arrived at Gibraltar on 13 November. Thraki left at the convoy the next day at Algiers. She departed Algiers on 21 November, joining Convoy MKS 31, which had departed from Port Said on 13 November 1943 and arrived at Gibraltar on 23 November. She departed Gibraltar the next day for Casablanca, Morocco, arriving on 25 November. Two days later, she joined Convoy OS 59, which had departed from Gibraltar and arrived at Freetown, Sierra Leone on 8 December. Two days later, Thraki departed Freetown as a member of Convoy ST 77, which arrived at Takoradi, Gold Coast on 15 December. She then sailed to Cape Town, South Africa, arriving on 26 December.

Thraki departed Cape town on 10 January 1944 for Durban, arriving on 14 January. She departed Durban four days later for Lourenço Marques, Mozambique, arriving on 20 January. She departed Lourenço Marques on 6 February for Mombasa, Kenya, arriving on 15 February and departing the next day for Aden, where she arrived on 25 February. She departed the same day for Massawa, Ethiopia, arriving on 28 February.

Thraki departed from Massawa on 22 March for Aden, arriving three days later. On 27 March, she joined Convoy AKD 19, which dispersed at sea on 30 March. She arrived at Diego Suarez, Madagascar on 6 April. She departed from Diego Suarez on 14 April for Lourenço Marques, where she arrived on 21 April. Thraki departed from Lourenço Marques on 6 May for Mombasa, arriving on 14 May. She then joined Convoy KD 3, which departed from Kilindini Harbour on 26 May and arrived at Durban on 4 June.

She joined Convoy DN 65, which departed Durban on 29 June and dispersed at sea on 2 July. Thraki arrived at Aden on 21 July. She then sailed to Port Said, from where she departed on 29 July for Alexandria, Egypt, arriving the next day. She departed Alexandria on 10 August, arriving back at Port Said the next day. She then sailed to Kosseir, from where she departed on 21 August for Aden, arriving on 27 August. She departed Aden on 30 August and arrived at Cape Town on 24 September. Thraki departed Cape Town on 6 October for Lourenço Marques, where she arrived on 11 October. She departed Lourenço Marques on 23 October for Colombo, Ceylon, arriving on 13 November. She departed Colombo on 9 December and arrived back at Lourenço Marques on 25 December.

Thraki departed from Lourenço Marques on 13 January 1945 and arrived at Aden on 1 February, leaving the next day for Suez, Egypt. On 24 February, she departed Suez for Port Sudan, Sudan, arriving on 27 February. Two days later, she departed Port Sudan for Aden, arriving on 4 March and departing the next day for Durban, where she arrived on 20 March. Thraki departed from Durban on 15 April and arrived at Colombo on 5 May. She departed from Colombo on 2 June for Lourenço Marques, arriving on 22 June and departing five days later for Aden, where she arrived on 12 July. The next day, she departed for Suez, arriving on 20 July. She then sailed to Port Said, and Alexandria, arriving on 22 July. Thraki departed from Alexandria on 3 August, arriving at Port Said the next day. She then sailed to Suez, from where she departed on 6 August for Kosseir. On 11 August, Thraki departed Kosseir for Aden, arriving on 17 August. She departed Aden two days later for Melbourne, where she arrived on 29 September.

=== Post-war ===
Thraki departed from Melbourne on 20 October 1945 for Adelaide, from where she departed on 25 October for Newcastle, New South Wales, arriving on 3 November. In 1947, Thraki was sold to Livanos Maritime Co Ltd, Greece and renamed Arietta. She served until 17 March 1960, when she ran aground off Novorossiysk, Soviet Union. Arietta was refloated on 1 April, but was declared to be a constructive total loss.
