= Georges Fouquet =

French jewelry designer

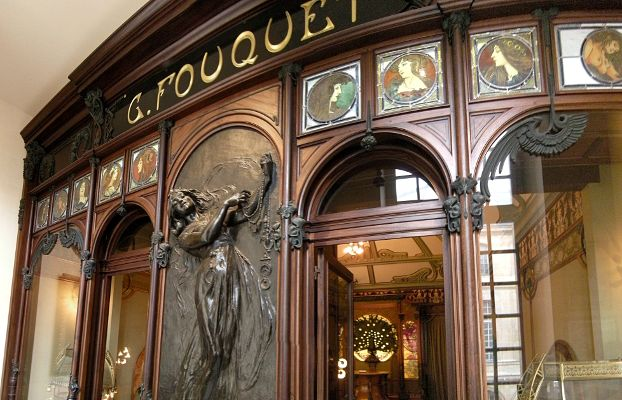
Facade of the jeweler's boutique Georges Fouquet at 6 rue Royale

Georges Fouquet (French: [ʒɔʁʒ fukɛ]; 1862–1957) was a French jewelry designer best known for his Art Nouveau creations. He was part of a successful jewellery family; his father Alphonse Fouquet designed in a neoclassicist style, and his son Jean Fouquet designed in the Art Deco style.

== Career ==
In Paris, Fouquet joined his father in the family business in 1891. He took over the running of the company in 1895. In 1900, he opened a new jewelry shop at 6 rue Royale in Paris, designed by the illustrator Alphonse Mucha.

In 1900, Fouquet was featured at the Exposition Universelle in Paris. His collaboration with Mucha was prominently showcased, unveiling a highly theatrical line of jewelry characterized by intricate enamel work, natural motifs, and the innovative use of materials like ivory, mother-of-pearl, and gemstones. This collection became an iconic representation of the Art Nouveau style.

Fouquet was a fantasist, and while his creations can be associated with the Lalique school, it is not due to imitation, but rather his imaginative talent. His work is often complex and holds a foremost place in the Art Nouveau movement. Contrary to Lalique but like Henri Vever, Fouquet expressed himself through more synthetic geometric forms.

He also designed jewels for French actresses such as Sarah Bernhardt. His work can be found at the Metropolitan Museum of Art, the Victoria and Albert Museum, the Petit Palais. The interior of Fouquet's shop is preserved at the Carnavalet Museum in Paris. In 1984, a major exhibition of three generations of the Fouquet Jewellers was made by the Musée des Arts Décoratifs, Paris; the exhibition was then shown at the Rietberg Museum in Zurich.
