= Aristophilus =

Ancient Greek druggist living around the 4th century BCE

Aristophilus (Ancient Greek: Ἀριστόφιλος) was an ancient Greek pharmakopōlēs, an ancient occupation that today would probably be translated as "druggist", "remedy seller", or "apothecary".

He was from Plataea in Boeotia, and lived probably around the fourth century BCE. He is mentioned by Theophrastus as possessing the knowledge of certain anaphrodisiac medicines, which he made use of either for the punishment or reformation of his slaves.

Scholar Suzanne Amigues suggested that this Aristophilus was the same person as the pharmakopōlēs named "Aristobulus" described by Aeschines in his Against Ctesiphon, father of the youth Aristion of Plataea who lived for a time in the house of the statesman Demosthenes.
