= Ari Westergård =

Finnish sports shooter

Personal information
- Born: 14 May 1948 Pori, Finland
- Died: 15 October 2010 (aged 62) Pori, Finland

Sport
- Sport: Sports shooting

Eero Ari Herbert Westergård (14 May 1948 – 15 October 2010) was a Finnish sports shooter. He competed at the 1972, 1976 and the 1980 Summer Olympics.
