= Iiro Seppänen =

Finnish filmmaker and writer

Iiro Seppänen (born July 13, 1975) is a Finnish producer, director and author. After successful careers as a master magician and professional BASE jumper, Seppänen turned his talents to filmmaking and since 2005 has produced two award-winning documentaries (The Ground is the Limit and Journey to the Center), more than 50 hours of prime time TV entertainment, the CBS transmedia micro-series The Courier, and executive produced the 2011 Robert De Niro film, Freelancers.

In 2009, Seppänen and Chinese film executive Frank Yang co-founded Pan-Pacific Entertainment, a Hollywood-based film investment, consulting and production company created to manage an independent motion picture fund, produce independent live-action and animated feature films, and provide transmedia planning and consulting. Pan-Pacific is principally engaged in the financing, production, co-production and worldwide distribution of these properties.

== Personal life ==
Seppänen was in a relationship with model Vera Jordanova for five years. He lived in Los Angeles, California, before moving to Cape Town, South Africa, where he lived with his Swiss-born Spanish-German wife, Julia Engelhorn, whom he had met in 2016 and with whom he has a daughter born in 2019. The family moved to London, England, in 2020.

The family faced tragedy in Cape Town in 2017, as Engelhorn's ex-husband, Spanish dentist Mario-César Deus Yela, murdered Engelhorn and Deus Yela's three-year-old twin children and threatened to kill Engelhorn. Deus Yela killed himself while in custody in 2018.
