= Ari Peltonen =

Finnish media persona (born 1969/1970)

Ari Peltonen (born 1969 or 1970), also known by the mononyms Paska (lit. 'shit') and Anssi, is a Finnish radio persona, a cappella rock singer, reporter, writer, and television host.

== Musical career ==
In 1985, Peltonen took part in the pre-qualification of the Finnish Rock Championship as a one-man a capella band called "Paska" (lit. 'shit'). The band performed music consisting solely of Peltonen's shouting. A debut EP, named Superdoublemegamaxihits!, was released in 1989. Over the following years, Paska performed in some fifty international venues, including Germany, Mexico, France, the Soviet Union, and the United States. In 2015, Billboard magazine highlighted Paska's cover of Motörhead's "Ace of Spades" as "one of the weirdest, most deconstructed versions out there". The band "broke up" in the 1990s due to "musical differences", and returned briefly in 2005.

== Radio and television career ==
Peltonen transitioned to radio in 1989, hosting Paskalista (lit. 'shit list') on Radio City. The show consisted of Peltonen's renditions of the Finnish top-ten singles chart. He soon began hosting a show called ANSSI! on Yle's Radiomafia. The show became a subject of criticism following a TV special report, and the coarse language of the show was brought up at least two times in the Finnish parliament. As a result, the show was initially suspended but later allowed to resume pre-taped. Another of Peltonen's shows, Vihatut levyt (lit. 'hated albums'), consisted of listener-submitted music that they least wanted to hear. Since 2001, Peltonen has hosted the show Paskalista on Radio Helsinki.

The entertainer has also appeared on television. In 2008, he hosted Paskareissu (lit. 'shit trip') on Sub TV. The show investigated some of the "worst" Finnish municipalities.

== Reporter and writer ==
In addition to his career as a musician and presenter, Peltonen has worked as a reporter for City magazine and Helsingin Sanomat.

He has authored five books.

== Other activities ==
In 2006, Peltonen claimed to have founded a 5 by 10 metres (20 by 30 ft) micronation called Valtio (lit. 'state') in Lapland on a plot of land owned by his reporter colleague Ilkka Malmberg. The microstate was the subject of multiple stories in Helsingin Sanomat's supplemental NYT and was "occupied" in 2007 by reporters of the Finnish Defence Forces' Ruotuväki magazine.

== Discography ==
- Superdoublemegamaxihits! (EP, 1989)
- Buy Play Throw Away (EP, 1989)
- Heterosapiens (EP, 1997)
- Christmas Album (EP, 2002)
- Women Are from Venus, Men from Anus (2005)
