= Ari Joshua Zucker =

American musician

Ari Joshua
- Also known as: Ari Joshua
- Born: Ariel Joshua Zucker
- Origin: Cape Town, South Africa
- Genres: Underground rock, jazz, Experimental
- Occupations: Guitarist, musician, songwriter, educator, composer, singer
- Instruments: Guitar, Voice
- Website: www.arijoshua.com www.musicfactorynw.com www.bighighmusic.com

Ari Joshua is an American guitarist, songwriter, and founding member of the bands Big High. Acidophilus Culture, The Fort Project, (Echo), Cadillac Arrest, Slow Bunny, Space Owl, & RAaR.

== History ==
Ari Joshua was born in Cape Town, South Africa but his early days as an artist were spent in Seattle, WA, where he grew up and first discovered his musical calling. He attended Roosevelt High School, and played 4 years in the jazz program (The RHS Jazz Band). His hard work and raw talent were quickly recognized, and Ari was awarded a scholarship to study music on the East Coast after high school. "Moving to New York and studying music for 5 years was one of the richest experiences of my life," says Ari. "It was from my fellow students and mentors at The New School, and Mason Gross School of the Arts that I began to appreciate the true power of musical expression."

Ari lived in NYC for approximately 5 years, including during the September 11th, 2001 attack on the World Trade Center. In 2003 he began traveling back and forth to Seattle to form a band with a long time collaborator.

Beginning in 2004, Ari worked as a teacher under the name 'Ari Zucker' at The Drum School (SDS) where he enjoyed a tenure until opening The Music Factory Music School.

Ari Joshua is the founding member of the rock band Big High, which was founded with singer Mesa (Robert Owen), and Bassist Sandy Dickerson (Sandy Rowe). After releasing their debut EP/Demo/Album, the band replaced Davey Knowles drummer Steven Barci with Mad Season, Screaming Trees, & Walking Papers drummer Barrett Martin and recorded two produced albums. One album self titled 'Big High' was recorded at Avast Studios. The second still-unreleased album was recorded at Queen's of the Stoneage's Joshua Tree studio 'Rancho de la Luna'.

Ari Joshua founded The Music Factory LLC in 2005, and moved the music education facility into a physical location on Madison Street in Seattle, WA in 2007. The Music Factory has taught over 40,000 music lessons to students of all ages, levels, & styles. The Music Factory has employed over 100 teachers and musicians for over a decade. (As of Dec. 2020) Ari Joshua started a record label at The Music Factory called Music Factory Records in 2010.

In 2011, Ari Joshua flew to Cape Town to collaborate with popstar aMF 'Freshly Ground' front woman Zolani Mahola. Pianist Kyle Shepperd, bassist Shane Cooper (Cards on Spokes) & drummer Jonno Swetman.

In 2012, Ari had a weekly residency playing guitar with legendary Santana drummer Michael Shrieve's in his band. He continued to work with the band 'Spellbinder' off an on filling in for steady guitarist Danny Godinez.

In 2014 Ari Joshua began working with the band Mctuff, a boogaloo organ trio led by Joe Doria. He continues to work with this band as a rotating member to this day.

In 2019 Ari recorded with Delvon Lamarr, Skerik, and Grant Schroff.

In 2020 Ari Joshua launched a throwback series of releases under the name 'From the Vault'.

In February 2021, in the wake of Trey Anastasio's 'Beacon Jams' sessions in NYC, Ari was invited to Burlington, VT to collaborate with Trey Anastasio Band, and Soule Monde bandmates Russ Lawton, & Ray Paczkowski at Tank Recording Company under the engineering of long time PHISH engineer Ben Collette. The trio recorded over 25 songs of Ari's original material.

At the end of October 2021, R.A.a.R (Ray, Ari, and Russ) debuted as a live act during Halloween weekend in Las Vegas. Singles 'Father Time', 'Star Lord' & 'Rae of Light' (written for Ari's 'Gramma Rae') have been initially released under Music Factory Records, and an EP of 6 new songs will be shared (as of November 2021 and will premier via Relix Magazine).

In January 2022 Ari participated in 3 recording sessions on the east coast; one with John Medeski, Billy Martin, and Jason Fraticelli, one with Russ Lawton,& Ray Paczkowski, and one with Eden Ladin, John Morgan Kimock, & Andy Hess. Music will begin release schedule on Music Factory Records in 2023.

== Played on Stage or Recorded with ==
Stone Gossard, Michael Shrieve, Joe Doria, Barrett Martin, Peter Buck, Kevin Sawka, Michael Kang, The Benevento Russo Duo, Anne Drummond, Tatum Greenblatt, Manuel Valera, Marcus Strickland, EJ Strickland, Reggie Watts, Robert Glasper, ill Gates, Skerik, Roy Hargrove, DJ Swamp, Keyon Harrold, Blake Lewis, Sir Mix-A-Lot, Tom Morello, Mike McCready, Skerik, Matt Butler's Everyone Orchestra, David Tiller, Matt Sircely, New Monsoon, Ralph Peterson, David Brogen (ALO), Shawn Smith, Russ Lawton, Ray Paczkowski, Delvon Lamarr, Galen Clarke, Lonnie Smith, Rashied Ali, Marco Benevento, John Medeski, Billy Martin, Joe Russo, Damion Reid, Jason Fraticelli, Delvon Lamarr, KJ Sawka, Russ Lawton, Andy Hess, Eden Ladin, John Kimock

Ari has worked with members of Medeski, Martin, & Wood, Santana, JRAD, Brad, Satchel, Handful of Lovin, Soule Monde, The Trey Anastasio Band (TAB), Pearl Jam, REM, Rage Against the Machine, Audio Slave, Pendulum, Destroid, Jrad, Screaming Trees, Mad Season, Sleater-Kinney, and more.

== Studied with ==
Richie Beirach, Kenny Barron, Reggie Workman, Ted Dunbar, Jack Wilkins, Vic Juris, Hal Galper, Jimmy Owens, Milo Petersen, George Garzone, Armen Donelian, Richard Boukas, Bobby Sanabria, Bill Kirshner, Jimmy Cobb, Gary Dial, classical guitarist Virginia Luque, Ralph Peterson, Noah Baerman, Larry Ridly, Mike Richmond, Ralph Bowen, Bill Fielder, Badal Roy, Wayne Krantz, and others.

== Other Gear ==
  - Roland Corporation VG-99
  - Roland Corporation GR-30
  - Roland Corporation Micro Cube
  - Taylor Guitars Taylor Acoustic
  - Mesa Boogie DC.50
  - Mesa Boogie Mark Series Vintage Mark III
  - Mesa Boogie Mark Series Vintage Mark IV
  - Kelstone Keystone
  - Languedoc Guitar Launguedoc Custom Guitar
  - fender hollow-body guitar Fender Hollow Body
  - 1961 Les Paul Vintage Les Paul
  - Monger Fooger moog pedals
  - NY XL D'adarrio strings
  - 1960's Guild Guitar
  - Game Changer Audio Pedal Plus

== Discography ==
=== Early Days ===
- Roosevelt Jazz Band
- Solidification Acidophilus Culture (1995)
- Live at Chez Oskar Ari Joshua Trio (2000)
- Open Road From Here Senior Thesis (2001)
- East vs West The Fort Green Project (2002)

=== Side Man / Compilation ===
- ATMA Atma (2004)
- Both Live Stone Gossard Solo (2009)
- Beautiful Lady Sound vs Silence Vol. 2 (2009)
- Clockwork Slow Bunny (2011)

=== Hathead ===
- Hathead Hathead (2004)

=== Swampdweller ===
- Swampdweller Swampdweller (2004)
- My Favorite Monster Swampdweller (2007)
- Circular Data Remix by DJ SWAMP (2007)

=== AriSawkaDoria ===
- Chapter One AriSawkaDoria (2006)
- Round Midnight AriSawkaDoria (2019)

=== Big High ===
- Big High EP Big High (2008)
- Big High Big High (2010)

=== From The Vault ===
- Say Watcha Wanna Say Ari Joshua Organ Quartet (feat Delvon Lamarr, Skerik, & Grant Schroff) (2019)
- Home Space Owl (2014)
- Eyes Only Robert Glasper, KJ Sawka, Jason Fraticelli (2021)
- Contact Robert Glasper, KJ Sawka, Jason Fraticelli (2022)
- I Will Come To You Space Owl (2014)
- Thunder and Lightning Space Owl (2014)
- Circular Data (feat. swampdweller, Marc Fendel, Reggie Watts, Joe Doria, Andy Sells, Farko Dosumov, Jay Roulston, Larry Mahlis, John Wicks & John Fricke) (2004)
- Why Does Love Always Break Your Heart Space Owl (2014)

=== Ari Joshua Quartet ===
- Impulse Ari Joshua Organ Quartet (feat Joel Bean, Jonti Siman, & Will Lone) (2020)
- Siblings Ari Joshua Organ Quartet (feat Joel Bean, Jonti Siman, & Will Lone) (2022)
- Walmart Dinosaurs Ari Joshua Organ Quartet (feat Joel Bean, Jonti Siman, & Will Lone) (2020)

=== RAaR* ===
- feat Ray Paczkowsk, & Russ Lawton (Soule Monde, Trey Anastasio Band)
- Father Time Ari Joshua's R.A.a.R (2021)
- Star Lord R.A.a.R (2021)
- Rae of Light Ari Joshua/R.A.a.R (2021)
- RaAR EP Ari Joshua/R.A.a.R (2021)
- Burlington Coat Factory R.A.a.R (2021)
- The Saga of Milly and Fee Part I - Peruvian Love Song (feat. Russ Lawton, Ray Paczkowski & Soule Monde) R.A.a.R (2022)
- The Saga of Milly and Fee Part II - The Prodigy (feat. Russ Lawton, Ray Paczkowski & Soule Monde) R.A.a.R (Jan 2023)
- The Clinic R.A.a.R (Jan 2023)

=== Ari Joshua, Billy Martin, & Jason Fraticelli ===
- Into the Void (2022)
- The Garden (2022)

=== The Bunker Sessions ===
- Eye Just Called To Soul, I Love You (feat. John Morgan Kimock, Andy Hess & Eden Ladin)(Jan 2023)

=== Ari Joshua, Billy Martin, John Medeski, & Jason Fraticelli ===
- Meeting of The Minds(Feb 2023)
