= Ari Saarinen =

Finnish ice hockey player (born 1967)

- Born: November 26, 1967 (age 57) Imatra, Finland
- Height: 6 ft 2 in (188 cm)
- Weight: 190 lb (86 kg; 13 st 8 lb)
- Position: Left wing
- Shot: Left
- Played for: Ässät; SaiPa; Anglet Hormadi Élite; EHC Lustenau
- Playing career: 1986–2003

Ari Saarinen (born November 26, 1967) is a Finnish former professional ice hockey left winger.

Saarinen played a total of 320 games in the SM-liiga for Ässät and SaiPa between 1993 and 1999. He also played in the Élite Ligue for Anglet Hormadi Élite in the 1999-00 season and the Austrian Hockey League for EHC Lustenau from 2000 to 2002.
