= Elizabeth Arrieta =

Uruguayan politician and engineer (1960–2019)

Elizabeth Arrieta (10 September 1960 – 30 November 2019) was a Uruguayan engineer and politician who served as a Deputy from 2015 until her death.
