= Ari Fuji =

Japanese aviator

- (藤 明里)
- Born: 1968 (age 57–58)
- Education: Rikkyo University
- Known for: First woman pilot-in-command and flight instructor for a domestic passenger airline in Japan
- Aviation career
- First flight: first flight as a pilot in command, July 12, 2010
- Famous flights: PIC operation on July 12, 2010, between Osaka Airport and Sendai Airport
- Flight license: co-pilot, JAL Express, April 2000; Pilot in command, Japan Air Lines, July 2, 2010 aviator, the United States of America

Ari Fuji (藤 明里, Fuji Ari; born 1968) is the first female pilot in command and flight instructor at a commercial passenger airline in Japan. She earned her original aviation license in the United States of America and trained to be a certified pilot for commercial passenger airline under Japanese aviation regulations.

== Biography ==
Ari Fuji grew up near Yokota Air Base, United States Air Force in Japan and aspired to become a pilot for a commercial airline. However, when she applied to the national Civil Aviation College, an Independent Administrative Institution regulated by the Ministry of Land, Infrastructure, Transport and Tourism, they rejected her request to take the entry examination, reasoning that she was too short to qualify.

After graduating from Toho Gakuen Girls' High School and Rikkyo University School of Law in Tokyo, Japan, she chose to work at a company in Japan, saved enough to study at a pilot training school in the United States of America obtaining her aviator's license. After returning home, she applied for the Japanese aviation certificate while she worked at a company, to be licensed as an aviator under Japanese aviation regulations.

=== First officer to a PIC ===
The former JAL Express (JEX) accepted Fuji as a trainee in 1999. She was licensed as a first officer in 2000, and in July 2010 she became the first woman pilot in command for a Japanese passenger airline. In those 11 years, she logged the over 5,500 flight hours required by JAL to qualify as a PIC.

JAL reformed its recruit system for pilots in the late 1990s, allowing licensed pilots to apply to their recruit program (just as new graduates could). Fuji applied and was admitted as a trainee pilot. (Note: JAL has not accepted licensed aviators any more as its recruiting candidates as of 2016.)

Since around 2005, Fuji-san concentrated on training toward the pilot-in-command (PIC) certification test. In 5 years she succeeded at a PIC test on July 2, 2010, at the age of 42 under stormy weather and received her certificate as the first woman pilot-in-command at a passenger airline in Japan at JAX headquarters in Osaka on July 9, 2010.

=== A training pilot ===
With additional flight hours over 600 and maintained outstanding performance at regular PIC sessions, as well as instructor pilot qualification, and in August 2015, certified as a training pilot aged 47, another first record for a woman in aviation industry to open doors for women.

She has been the only woman PIC in Japan as of 2015 and commanded every Doll Festival flight each March 3, when JAL appointed an all-woman flight operation team including ground staff, mechanics and crews. For Haneda - Komatsu line, JAL flew the first Doll Festival flight on 3 March 2016.
