= Ari Ankorion =

Israeli politician and lawyer

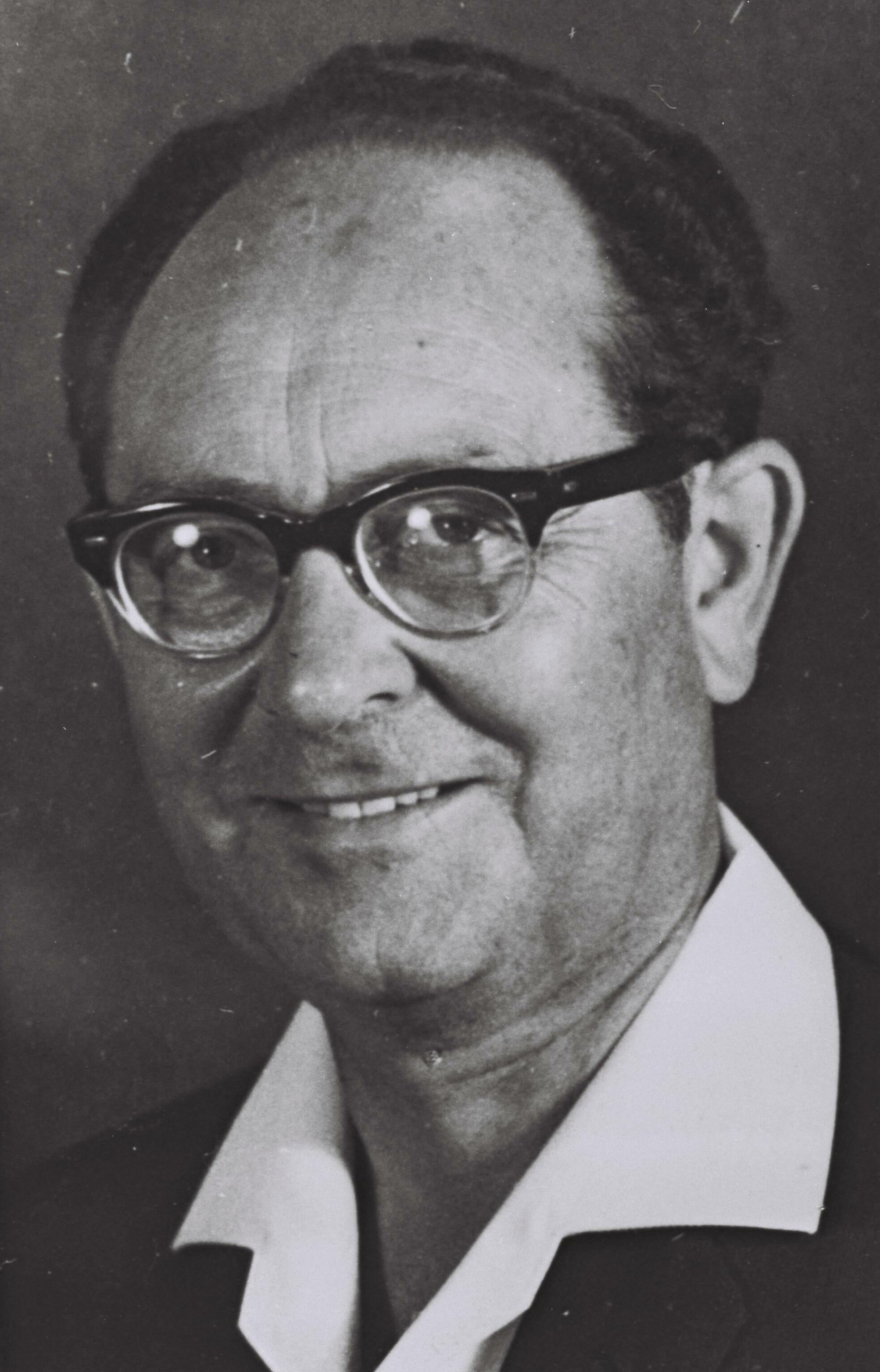
- Anorkion in 1969

Faction represented in the Knesset
- 1965: Mapai
- 1969–1977: Alignment

Personal details
- Born: 2 October 1908 Kalvarija, Russian Empire
- Died: 11 March 1986 (aged 77)

Ari Ankorion (Hebrew: ארי אנקוריון; 2 October 1908 – 11 March 1986) was an Israeli politician and lawyer.

== Biography ==
Ari Wolowitzky was born in Kalvarija in the Russian Empire. He attended a heder and a Hebrew science and technology school. He studied law at Vytautas Magnus University in Kaunas and was certified as a lawyer. While a student, he joined the Zionist Students Organisation in Kaunas. He was also a member of the Socialist Zionist Party and the League for a Workers Israel. In 1933 he emigrated to Mandatory Palestine.

After the move to Palestine, he worked as a lawyer in Jerusalem. Between 1934 and 1935, he was a member of the Mapai secretariat in the city. From 1936 until 1938, he was a London correspondent for Davar. Whilst in London he also attended the London School of Economics, gaining a PhD in philosophy. After returning to Palestine, he worked as a legal advisor for Hevrat Ovdim, the Histadrut's holding company, from 1940 until 1946.

He was on the Mapai list for the 1961 elections, and although he failed to win a seat, he entered the Knesset on 7 July 1965 as a replacement for the deceased Moshe Sharett. However, he lost his seat in the November 1965 elections. Nevertheless, he returned to the Knesset for a second time on 26 February 1969 as a replacement for Prime Minister Levi Eshkol, who had died in office. He was re-elected in the October 1969 elections, and again in 1973, before losing his seat for a final time in the 1977 elections.

He died in 1986 at the age of 77.
