= Ari de Oliveira =

Brazilian footballer

Ari
Personal information
- Full name: Ari de Oliveira
- Date of birth: 26 July 1932
- Place of birth: Duque de Caxias, Brazil
- Date of death: 6 December 1977 (aged 45)
- Place of death: Rio de Janeiro, Brazil
- Height: 1.75 m (5 ft 9 in)
- Position: Goalkeeper

Youth career
- Onze Cabuloso (Caju)

Senior career*
| Years | Team | Apps | (Gls) |
| 1950–1954 | Bonsucesso | | |
| 1955–1957 | Flamengo | 90 | (0) |
| 1958–1966 | America-RJ | | |
- * Club domestic league appearances and goals as of 3 June 2024

Ari de Oliveira (26 July 1932 – 6 December 1977) was a Brazilian professional footballer who played as a goalkeeper.

== Career ==
With just 1.75 m in height, Ari started his career playing on the line, but still in amateur football, where he played in the Caju neighborhood, he ended up adapting to the goalkeeper position. He began his professional career at Bonsucesso in 1950, and played for the club for four seasons. He arrived at Flamengo in 1955, where he refused to play wearing gloves, and was state champion that year. He made a total of 90 appearances for the club. His last club was America, where he became a hero in 1960 by holding off Fluminense's attack in the state final. He played until 1966 when he retired from football. He worked in public welfare until 1977, when he suffered a stroke and died.

== Honours ==
Flamengo

- Campeonato Carioca: 1955
- Torneio Internacional do Rio de Janeiro: 1955

America-RJ

- Campeonato Carioca: 1960
