= Ari Clemente =

Brazilian footballer (born 1939)

Personal information
- Full name: Ari Paulino Clemente da Silva
- Date of birth: 7 January 1939 (age 87)
- Place of birth: São Paulo, Brazil
- Height: 5 ft 11 in (1.80 m)
- Position: Defender

Senior career*
| Years | Team | Apps | (Gls) |
| 1958–1964 | Corinthians | 188 | (0) |
| 1965–1967 | Bangu | | |
| 1967 | → Houston Stars (loan) | | |
| 1968–1970 | Saad | | |

International career
| 1961 | Brazil | 1 | (0) |
- * Club domestic league appearances and goals

Ari Paulino Clemente da Silva (born 7 January 1939) is a Brazilian former footballer who played as a defender.

== Career ==
Born in São Paulo, Clemente played for Corinthians, Bangu, Houston Stars, and Saad. He also earned one cap for the Brazil national team.
