= Ari Koponen (politician) =

Finnish politician

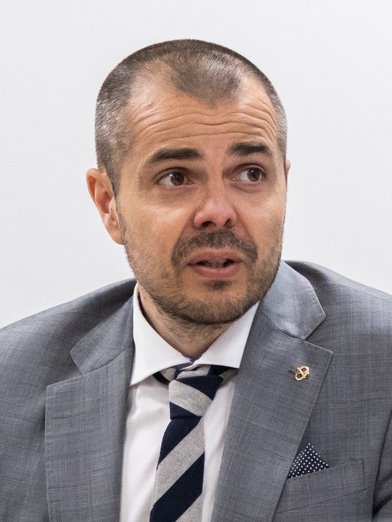
- Koponen in 2023.

Member of the Finnish Parliament for Uusimaa

Personal details
- Born: 5 May 1982 (age 43) Vantaa, Uusimaa, Helsinki
- Party: Finns Party

Ari Koponen (born 5 May 1982 in Vantaa) is a Finnish politician currently serving in the Parliament of Finland for the Finns Party at the Uusimaa constituency.
