= Ari Lohenoja =

Finnish businessperson (born 1958)

Ari Lohenoja (born May 13, 1958, in Helsinki) is a Finnish businessperson who has made a career in the music and television businesses. Since mid-2000s, he works for the Finnish Defence Forces as their marketing communications expert.

After finishing his Master's degree at the Turku School of Economics, Lohenoja made a 15-year career as marketing executive at the Finnish branches of international record companies CBS Records, Warner Music and Sony Music. He took care of record promotion for artists such as Kaija Koo, Taikapeili, and Aki Sirkesalo.

In 1998 he became managing director of StoryFilm, a production company striving to expand from TV commercials into television shows. In 1999, he directed and produced Aaken ja Sakun kesäkeittiö, a cookery TV series for MTV3, working with actors such as Aake Kalliala and Sakari Kuosmanen.

In the early 2000s, Lohenoja held executive positions at TV production houses Fremantle Media and Filmiteollisuus Fine before becoming marketing specialist at the Finnish Defence Forces.
