= Ari Angervo =

Finnish classical violinist and conductor

Mauri Arijoutsi Angervo (born July 11, 1944 in Mikkeli, Finland) is a Finnish classical violinist and conductor.

== Education ==
Angervo studied at the Sibelius Academy in Finland, but also in Stockholm and Saint Petersburg. He studied the violin under the guidance of Onni Suhonen, chamber music with Andras Mihaly, Mieczysław Horszowski ja György Ligeti, and orchestral conducting with Arvid Jansons and Jorma Panula.

== Career ==
Angervo played in the Finnish National Opera Orchestra from 1965 to 1975, first as a member and then as concertmaster for seven years.

Since his debut concert in 1970, Angervo has performed as a soloist and chamber musician all around Europe and New Zealand. In the 1970s, he also won prizes in national and international string quartet competitions, including 1st prize in a competition organized by YLE.

As a conductor, Angervo has worked for various Finnish city orchestras and the Finnish National Opera Orchestra. In addition, he has also conducted numerous symphony orchestras abroad, including in Germany, France, Italy, Spain, Japan and New Zealand, where he has worked as a guest conductor for the Auckland Philharmonia Orchestra.

== Teaching ==
Angervo has taught the violin at the West Helsinki Music Institute and the Sibelius Academy, where he has also taught orchestral conducting. Additionally, Angervo has taught the violin and orchestral conducting in Finnish universities of applied sciences.
