= Ari Heikkinen (footballer, born 1957) =

Finnish footballer (born 1957)

Personal information
- Date of birth: 8 April 1957 (age 69)
- Place of birth: Kuopio, Finland
- Position: Defender

International career
Years	Team	Apps	(Gls)
1979–1980	Finland	4	(0)

Ari-Pekka Heikkinen (born 8 April 1957) is a Finnish footballer who competed in the men's tournament at the 1980 Summer Olympics.
