= Joxe Austin Arrieta =

Basque writer

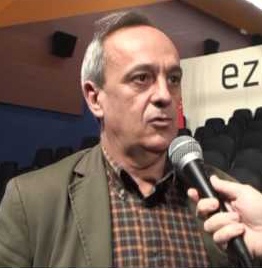
- Born: 26 October 1949 (age 76); San Sebastián, Gipuzkoa, Spain
- Occupation: translator
- Writing career
- Language: Basque

Joxe Austin Arrieta Ugartetxea (born 26 October 1949) is a Spanish Basque writer and translator.

== Life ==
Arrieta was born in San Sebastián, Gipuzkoa. He obtained a degree in Philosophy and Literature (Romanic Philology). From 1982 until he retired, he worked at a bank as a translator. He has been a teacher and a lecturer at the EUTG School of Languages and Philosophy. He has also worked in other areas of Basque culture, collaborating with associations like UZEI and UEU.

He has taken political positions in the field of culture and Basque language.

He has written poetry and narrative and has also excelled as a literary translator. His first published work was Bidaia-Termitosti (Ustela, 1978) a book of short stories. After that, in 1979, Arrieta published his first novel, Abuztuaren 15eko bazkalondoa. Among his poetry books, Mintzoen mintzak (Elkar, 1989) and Graffitien ganbara (Kutxa, 1995) stand out. But Arrieta is also a renowned translator and has translated works from French, English, Catalan and German languages into Basque: the play by Marguerite Yourcenar, Memoirs of Hadrian, Lord of the Flies by William Golding and Homo Faver, by Max Frisch.

== Works ==
=== Narratives ===
- Bidaia - Termitosti (1978, Ustela)
- Labur aroz (1997, Txalaparta)

=== Novels ===
- Abuztuaren 15eko bazkalondoa (1979, GAK): ISBN 9788475292472, OCLC 907310973
- Manu militari (1987, Elkar)
- Terra Sigillata (2008, Txalaparta)

=== Poetry ===
- Arrotzarena neurtitz neurgabeak (1983, GAK)
- Bertso-paper printzatuak (1986, Elkar)
- Mintzoen mintzak (1989, Elkar)
- Graffitien ganbara (1996, Kutxa fundazioa)
- XX. mendeko poesia kaierak (2001, Susa): Koldo Izagirreren edizioa
- Orbaibar (2003, Kutxa Fundazioa)
