= Arie =

Arie is a (usually) masculine given name.

As a Dutch name, Arie (pronounced [ˈaːri]) is generally a short form of Adrianus, but sometimes also of Arend or Arent, Arnout or Arnoud, or even Aaron.

As a Hebrew name, Arie (pronounced [ʔarˈje]) is a transliteration of the Hebrew word or name אריה, which means lion. Other transliterations include Arieh, Aryeh, Arye, and Ari.

People with the name include:

- Arie Altman (Plant Biology and AgBiotech) (born 1937), Israeli Professor of Agriculture
- Arie den Arend (1903–1982), Dutch composer
- Arie van Beek (born 1951), Dutch music teacher and conductor
- Arie Bieshaar (1899–1965), Dutch footballer (Adrianus)
- Arie Bijl (1908–1945), Dutch theoretical physicist and resistance member
- Arie Bijvoet (1891–1976), Dutch footballer
- Arie Bodek (born 1947), American experimental particle physicist and professor
- Arie van den Brand (born 1951), Dutch GreenLeft politician
- Arie van de Bunt (born 1969), Dutch water polo player (Arend)
- Arie Carpenter or "Aunt Arie" (1885–1978), American woman portrayed in the play Firefox
- Arie van Deursen (1931–2011), Dutch historian
- Arie Duijvestijn (1927–1998), Dutch computer scientist (Adrianus)
- Arie Dvoretzky (1918–2008), Russian-born Israeli mathematician (Aryeh)
- Arie Eriks, (born 1947), Dutch speed skater
- Arie Evegroen (1905–1988), Dutch schipper who prevented a flood in 1953
- Arie Freiberg (born 1949), Australian legal academic
- Arie de Geus (1930–2019), Dutch business executive at Royal Dutch/Shell
- Arie de Graaf (1939–1995), Dutch track cyclist
- Arie de Graaf (born 1947), Dutch politician
- Arie Gur'el (1918–2017), Polish-born mayor of Haifa, Israel (Aryeh)
- Arie Jan Haagen-Smit (1900–1977), Dutch chemist (Adrianus)
- Arie Haan (born 1948), Dutch football player and coach (Arend)
- Arie Nicolaas Habermann (1932–1993), Dutch computer scientist
- Arie den Hartog (1941–2018), Dutch road bicycle racer
- Arie Hassink (born 1950), Dutch road bicycle racer (Arend)
- Arie Heijkoop (1883–1929), Dutch politician
- Arie van Houwelingen (born 1931), Dutch bicycle racer
- Arie Irawan (1990–2019), Malaysian golfer
- Arie Itman, Canadian heavy metal singer and guitarist
- Arie de Jong (1865–1957), Dutch physician, linguist and Volapük enthusiast
- Arie de Jong (fencer) (1882–1966), Dutch fencer (Adrianus)
- Arie Kaan (1901–1991), Dutch hurdler
- Arie Kaplan, American writer and comedian
- Arie E. Kaufman (born 1948), American computer scientist
- Arie Klaase (1903–1983), Dutch long-distance runner
- Arie L. Kopelman (born 1938), American businessman and philanthropist
- Arie Kosto (born 1938), Dutch State Secretary for Justice
- Arie Kouandjio (born 1992), American football player
- Arie W. Kruglanski (born 1939), Polish social psychologist
- Arie Andries Kruithof (1909–1993), Dutch physicist
- Arie Frederik Lasut (1909–1993), Indonesian geologist and revolutionary
- Arie Lamme (1748–1801), Dutch landscape painter and poet
- Arie Johannes Lamme (1812–1900), Dutch painter and museum director
- Arie van Leeuwen (1910–2000), Dutch hurdler
- Arie van Lent (born 1970), Dutch footballer active in Germany
- Arie Loef (born 1969), Dutch speed skater
- Arie Luyendyk (born 1953), Dutch auto racing driver
- Arie Luyendyk Jr. (born 1981), Dutch-American auto racing driver; son of the above
- Arie van Os (born 1937), Dutch businessman and financial director
- Arie Pais (1930–2022), Dutch politician and economist (Aäron)
- Arie van der Pluym (1906–1934), Dutch motorcycle racer
- Arie Zeev Raskin (born 1976), Chief Rabbi of Cyprus
- Arie Rip (born 1941), Dutch social scientist
- Arie Schans (born 1953), Dutch football manager
- Arie Slob (born 1961), Dutch politician
- Arie Smit (1916–2016), Dutch-born Indonesian painter (Adrianus)
- Arie van der Stel (1894–1986), Dutch cyclist
- Arie Supriyatna (born 1984), Indonesian footballer
- Arie Van de Moortel (1918–1976), Belgian violist and composer
- Arie van der Velden (1881–1967), Dutch sailor
- Arie Vermeer (1922–2013), Dutch footballer (Adrianus)
- Arie Verveen (born 1976), Irish actor
- Arie van Vliet (1916–2001), Dutch cyclist and 1936 Olympic champion
- Arie de Vois (1632–1680), Dutch Golden Age painter
- Arie Vooren (1923–1988), Dutch racing cyclist
- Arie Vos (born 1976), Dutch motorcycle racer
- Arie Vosbergen (1882–1918), Dutch middle and long-distance runner
- Arie de Vroet (1918–1999), Dutch footballer
- Arie de Winter (1915–1983), Dutch footballer (Arend)
- Arie Zwart (1903–1981), Dutch painter (Adrianus)
- India Arie (born 1975, American singer and songwriter

== Mythology ==
- Amabie, a Japanese mermaid-like yokai sometimes called "Arie".
