= Arieh =

Arieh is both a given name and a surname. Arieh means lion in Hebrew. Other transliterations include Arie, Aryeh, Arye, and Ari.

Notable people with the name include:

== Given name ==
- Arieh Batun-Kleinstub (born 1933), Israeli Olympic high jumper
- Arieh Ben-Naim (born 1934), professor of physical chemistry at the Hebrew University of Jerusalem
- Arieh Dulzin (1913–1989), Zionist activist who served as a Minister without Portfolio in Israel
- Arieh Elias (1921–2015), Israeli actor
- Arieh Handler (1915–2011), Zionist leader
- Arieh Iserles (born 1947), computational mathematician
- Arieh Levavi (1912–2009), fourth Director General of the Israeli Israeli Ministry of Foreign Affairs
- Arieh Lubin (1897–1980), Israeli artist
- Arieh O'Sullivan (born 1961), American-Israeli author, journalist, and defense correspondent
- Arieh Sharon (1900–1984), Israeli architect
- Arieh "Xiaomanyc" Smith (born 1990), American polyglot YouTuber
- Arieh Warshel (born 1940), Israeli-American Distinguished Professor of Chemistry and Biochemistry, and Nobel Prize winner

== Surname ==
- Josh Arieh (born 1974), American professional high stakes poker player
