= Two Male Heads (Bosch) =

Painting formerly attributed by Hieronymus Bosch

- Two Figures Wearing Mitres (fragment)
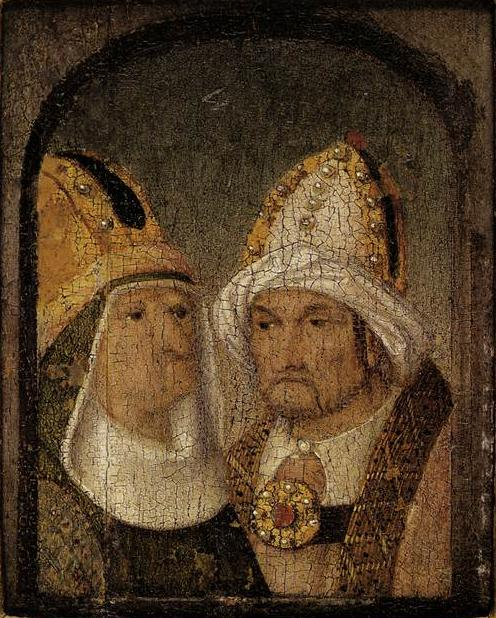
- Artist: Hieronymus Bosch
- Year: c. 1480 (Julian)
- Medium: oil paint, panel
- Dimensions: 14.5 cm (5.7 in) × 12 cm (4.7 in)
- Location: Museum Boijmans Van Beuningen
- Accession: 1177 (OK)

Two Male Heads is an anonymous painting formerly attributed to the Early Netherlandish painter Hieronymus Bosch. It is currently in the Museum Boijmans Van Beuningen in Rotterdam.

The work became part of the museum's collection via its founder's Frans Jacob Otto Boijmans' bequest in 1847.
