= Arye =

Arye is a Hebrew masculine given name and occasionally a surname, a spelling variant of Aryeh.

- Arye Carmon
- Arye Gross
- Arye L. Hillman
- Arye Kohavi
- Arye Nehorai
- Arye Oded
- Arye Rosen
- Arye Sharuz Shalicar

== Surname ==
- Leonora Arye
