= Margaretha Cornelia Boellaard =

Dutch painter

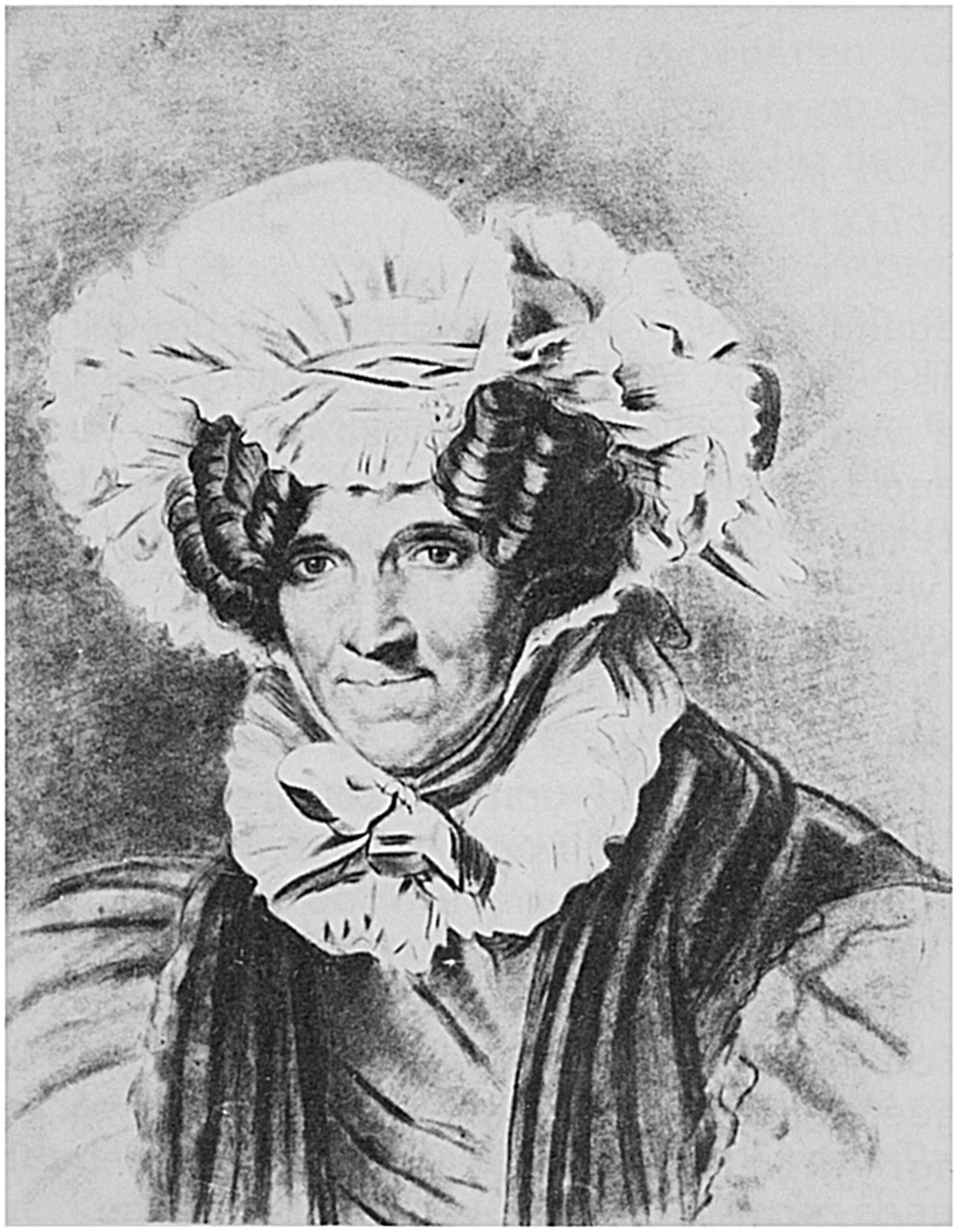
Margaretha Cornelia Boellaard (c.1825); by Pieter Christoffel Wonder

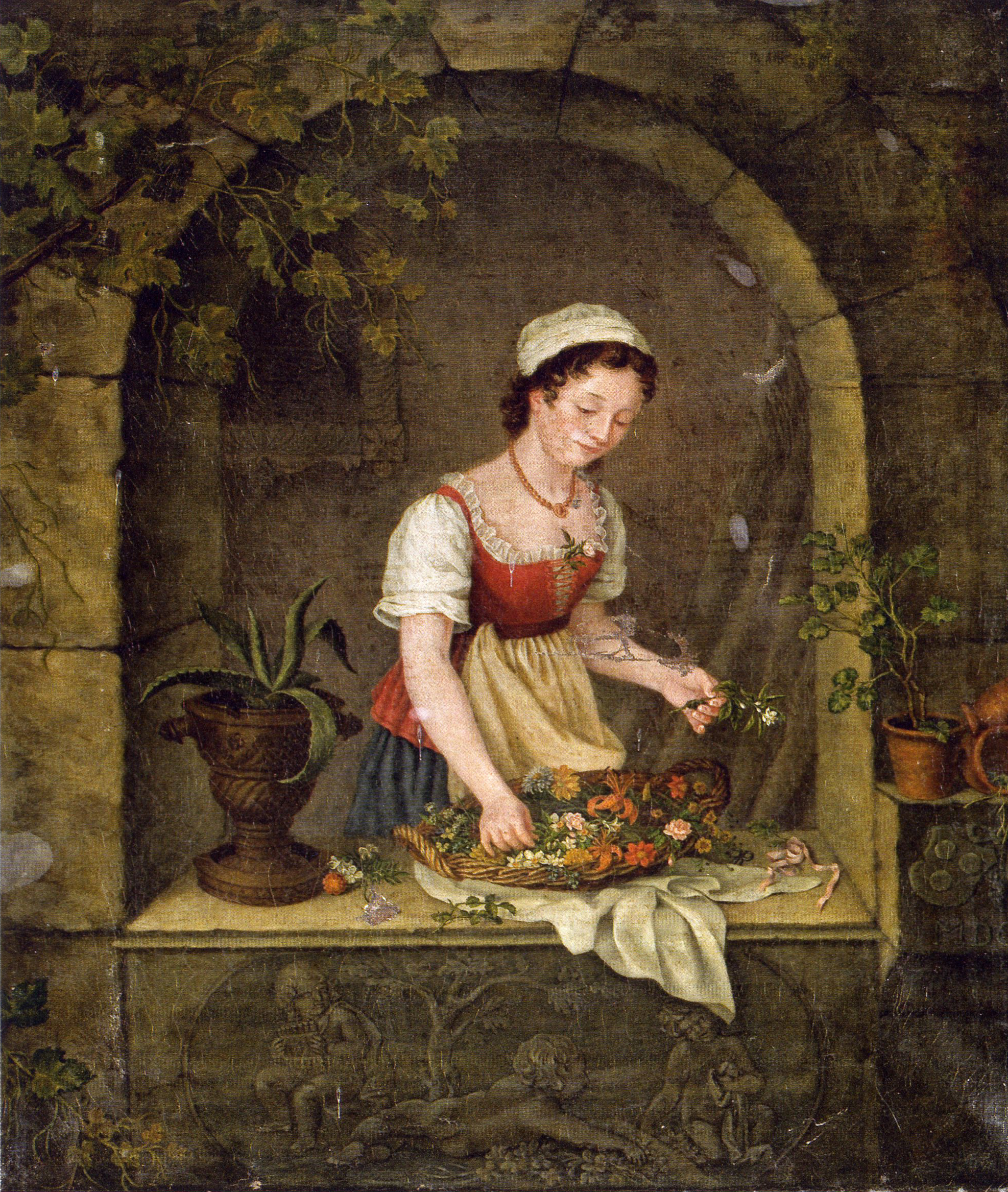
Girl with Flowers (1834)

Margaretha Cornelia Boellaard (9 February 1795, Utrecht – 5 November 1872, Utrecht) was a Dutch painter, lithographer and art collector.

== Biography ==
She came from a wealthy noble family. Her father, Johan Diderick, was the Heer (Baron or Lord) of Zuilichem. Her mother, Margaretha, died six days after she was born and her father never remarried, so she remained an only child. She received private art lessons from the portrait painters Christiaan van Geelen and his son, also named Christiaan as well as the landscape painter, Cornelis van Hardenbergh. In 1825, she was also able to audit classes at the Rijksakademie in Amsterdam. Frans Jacob Otto Boijmans, a noted art collector, allowed her to copy works from his collection.

Her works were exhibited in several cities. From 1826 to 1843, she was a regular participant in Amsterdam's Exhibition of Living Masters. In 1834, she received an award from the Academie Minerva for her painting Meisje met bloemen (Girl with Flowers). In 1858, she was the first woman to become an honorary member of the "Genootschap Kunstliefde", an artists' society in Utrecht. In her later years her eyesight declined. By 1864, she was unable to paint and devoted herself entirely to art collecting. She also used her collection to present lectures and discussions at Arti et Amicitiae, the Pulchri Studio and Pictura in Dordrecht.

She never married so, after her death, she willed most of her belongings to the Kunstliefde, including her home on the Oudegracht, which became a museum and exhibition hall in 1905. The rental fees for the hall were put into the Boellaard fund. In 1984, part of this fund was used to establish the "Boellaardprijs".

Between 1984-2010 the Boellaard fund was used to award and recognise an Utrecht artist each year. Their work would be exhibited at an autumn exhibition. In 2013 the prize was redefined, becoming known as the Boellaard Prize, and was awarded to artists aged 50 or older with Utrecht roots.
