= Aryeh (name) =

Aryeh is a transliteration of the Hebrew word אריה, which means lion. It is a common Hebrew masculine given name. Other transliterations include Arie, Arieh, Arye, and Ari.

People so named include the following:

- Aryeh Altman (1902–1982), Israeli politician
- Aryeh Azulai (born 1933), Israeli mayor
- Aryeh Bahir (1906–1970), Israeli politician
- Aryeh Ben-Eliezer (1913–1970), Revisionist Zionist leader, Irgun member and Israeli politician
- Aryeh Leib Bernstein (1708–1788), Chief Rabbi of Galicia
- Aryeh Nussbaum Cohen (born 1994), American opera singer
- Aryeh Deri (born 1959), Israeli politician and leader of the Shas party
- Aryeh Dvoretzky (1916–2008), Russian-born Israeli mathematician, eighth president of the Weizmann Institute of Science
- Aryeh Eldad (born 1950), Israeli physician and politician
- Aryeh Eliav (1921–2010), Israeli politician
- Aryeh Leib Epstein (1708–1775), Polish rabbi
- Aryeh Tzvi Frumer (1884–1943), Orthodox rabbi, rosh yeshiva, and posek
- Aryeh Gamliel (1951–2021), Israeli politician
- Aryeh Leib ben Asher Gunzberg (c. 1695–1785), Lithuanian rabbi and author
- Aryeh Leib HaCohen Heller (1745–1812), rabbi, Talmudist and Halachist in Galicia
- Aryeh Moskona (1947–2025), Bulgarian-born Israeli actor and singer
- Aryeh Kaplan (1934–1983), American Orthodox rabbi and author
- Aryeh Kasher (1935–2011), Israeli historian and author
- Aryeh Kosman (1935–2021), American scholar and professor of philosophy
- Aryeh Lebowitz (born 1977), American Orthodox rabbi, author and posek
- Aryeh Levin (1885–1969), Orthodox rabbi
- Aryeh Nehemkin (1925–2021), Israeli politician
- Aryeh Neier (born 1937), American human rights activist
- Aryeh Tartakower (1897–1982), Polish-born Israeli political activist, historian and sociologist

== Surname ==
- Yevgeny Aryeh, Israeli theater director, playwright, scriptwriter, and set designer.
