= Rosa Barba =

Italian visual artist and filmmaker

- Born: 10 December 1972 (age 53); Agrigento, Sicily, Italy
- Known for: video art, installation art
- Website: www.rosabarba.com

Rosa Barba (born 1972, Agrigento, Italy) is an Italian visual artist and filmmaker. Barba is known for using the medium of film and its materiality to create cinematic film installations, sculptures and publications, relate to avant-garde film and speculative fiction, and which inquire into the ambiguous nature of reality, memory, landscape and their role in their mutual constitution and representation. Suspended between dichotomies—permanent and impermanent, real and fictional, obsolescent and modern, conceptual and concrete, alien and familiar, Rosa Barba’s multiform practice encompasses films, sculptures, installations, live-performances, text, sound. Barba currently lives and works in Berlin, Germany.

== Early life and education ==
Rosa Barba was born in 1972 in the town of Agrigento, on the Italian island of Sicily. She started practicing photography before experimenting with moving images using super 8 film. From 1993 to 1995 she studied Theater and Film Studies in Erlangen, Germany. She continued her studies in film between 1995 and 2000 at the Academy of Media Arts Cologne in Cologne, Germany. Barba made her first 16mm film while at the academy, titled Panzano (2000), in which three characters struggle to assign parts among themselves. In 2018, Barba acquired her PhD at the Malmö Art Academy at Lund University, under the supervision of Sarat Maharaj, professor for Visual Arts and Knowledge Systems.

The various professional and educational experiences have brought Barba to teaching and she currently holds a Professorship in Art in Space and Time at the Department of Architecture of ETH Zürich.

== Work ==
Barba interrogates the industry of cinema and regards it in her work in an architectural sense and as an instrument, where the environment, the screen and the projection can be pushed forward to create another spatiotemporal dimension that is concurrent with and points beyond the context of interior or exterior space. She “contests and recasts truth and fiction, myth and reality, metaphor and material, to a disorienting degree that ultimately extends into a conceptual practice that also recasts the viewer’s own staging as an act of radical and exhilarating reversal—from being the receiver of an image (a subject of control) to being in and among its engine room(s), looking out.”

She exhibits in galleries and museums internationally. She has exhibited at MoMA, New York, (2024), MAXXI, Rome, (2023, 2025), MALI, Lima (2024), Depot Museum Boijmans, Rotterdam (2024), Centre Pompidou, Paris (2023-2024), Tate Modern, London (2023), PICA, Perth Australia (2023), Villa Medici, Rome (2022), Neue Nationalgalerie, Berlin (2021-2022), Cukrarna, Ljubljana (2021, 2022) Tabakalera, International Centre for Contemporary Culture, San Sebastián, and at Kunsthalle Bremen. Other recent solo shows include the Museo Nacional Centro de Arte Reina Sofía, Palacio de Cristal, Madrid (2017); Pirelli HangarBicocca, Milan (2017); Malmö Konsthall (2017); CAPC musée d'art contemporain de Bordeaux (2016-2017); Schirn Kunsthalle Frankfurt (2016); MIT Visual Arts Center, Cambridge, MA; Albertinum in Dresden; Center of Contemporary Art, Vilnius (2014); MAXXI, Rome (2014); Turner Contemporary, Margate (2013); Bergen Kunsthall (2013); MUSAC in Castilla y Leon (2013); Kunsthaus Zürich (2012), Jeu de Paume, Paris, (2012); Contemporary Art Museum St. Louis; Fondazione Galleria Civica, Trento, and MART, Rovereto (2011); Kunstverein Braunschweig (2011) and Tate Modern, London (2010).

Barba has participated in the 52nd, 53rd and 56th Venice Biennale. At the 56th Biennale All the World's Futures, curated by Okwui Enwezor (2015), Barba exhibited Bending to Earth (2015). She participated in the Liverpool Biennale in 2010, in the 2nd Thessaloniki Biennale of Contemporary Art, Performa13, New York (2013), the Beaufort Triennale (2021), as well as in various festivals and other biennials. She participated in the inaugural Malta Biennale in 2024. In 2010 she curated the group show A Curated Conference at the Museo Nacional Centro de Arte Reina Sofia, Madrid with works from the collection. Afterwards, the exhibition was the inspiration for the films The Hidden Conference I-III, which were performatively filmed in various museum depots.

The idea of preservation is further mined through her exploration of nature and the cosmos, which are both capable of preserving documents regarding the relationship between human beings and nature and the influence that they have exerted on it. They also share the encounter between old and new technologies, a coming together prompted by how they are used, as happens with deserts, or by the need to what is out of sight, as is the case with astronomy. In The Color out of Space (2015) she draws parallel between artistic and scientific investigations which reveal themselves as essentially speculative endeavours.

Barba has been actively developing her practice through a number of international residencies, including the two-year residency program at Rijksakademie van Beeldende Kunsten in Amsterdam (2003-2004); Production-in-Residence program, Baltic Arts Center Visby (2006); Villa Aurora, Pacific Palisades, Los Angeles, USA (2006); IASPIS Stockholm (2007-2008) and the Artists-in-Residence-Programme of Chinati Foundation, Marfa, Texas (2013).

Later residencies include a stay at the Curtis R. Priem Experimental Media and Performing Arts Center EMPAC at Rensselaer Polytechnic Institute, Troy (NY) in 2014-15, a residency at Headlands Center for the Arts in San Francisco (CA) and Denniston Hill, Glen Wild in 2017, Guest Artist programme of Arts at CERN, Geneva and Atelier Calder, Saché, France in 2021, Callie’s, Berlin in 2022 and Schaufler Residency @TU Dresden in 2023.

At EMPAC, Barba was commissioned a new work production in collaboration with Rensselaer's Hirsch Observatory, which resulted in two site-specific installations spanning different media formats, The Color out of Space and White Museum.

At Callie’s, Berlin, Barba developed Voice Engine, a performance installation which has been presented at Centre Pompidou in 2023 and Depot Boijmans Van Beuningen, Rotterdam in 2024.

Barba's works belong to collections such as Louisiana Museum of Modern Art, Humlebæk, Staatliche Museen zu Berlin: Home Hamburger Bahnhof - Museum für Gegenwart, Berlin], Museo Centro de Arte Reina Sofía, Madrid, MACBA, Barcelona and Kunsthaus Zürich.

=== Film ===
Barba's films develop from situations that form societies and landscapes. By using her film camera as a drawing instrument, she outlines and relates directly to the formal properties of an object. She investigates environments and weaves stories of place and people into fictitious narratives that open up new possibilities for interpretation.

For example, in the film Outwardly from Earth's Center that was produced on the Swedish island Gotland during the winter of 2006 as a Production-in-Residence project for the Baltic Art Center in Sweden, Barba collaborated with the local inhabitants, who also performed in the film, to create narratives and form characters as the filming progressed. Outwardly from Earth's Center is constructed around a fictitious society living on the truly existing island of Gotska Sandön, which drifts approximately one meter per year and. The depiction of the small society trying to hold up the disappearance of the island develops into a surrealistic atmosphere that slowly but surely replaces the experience of what one might consider a beautiful documentary with a more abstract and somewhat absurd picture of people's struggle and vulnerability. In 2019, she produced Aggregate States of Matters, a 35mm film shot in the Peruvian Andes which deals with the increasing impact of climate change on remote areas. At its core, the film pivots on the ambivalent negotiation between the binary idea of nature and culture, oscillating within the contemporary discourse on the environment, and its complex layers based on scientific, philosophical, spiritual and cultural approaches. Barba worked with communities that are affected by glacier melting and its geological time becoming present today. In a cautious, yet scrutinised exploration, the film illustrates blurring and melding boundaries between human and non-human actors.

=== Sculpture and installation ===
Barba's sculptures and installations are created from the physical and conceptual components of the cinema which become dissected, abstracted, compiled and arranged anew. The roles and relations of the various components are questioned and newly defined: the mechanical objects move, speak and become the main protagonists in the exhibition space.

For example, the work Boundaries of Consumption (2012) features a 16 mm projector directed at film cans with silver globes balancing while the film runs through. The shadow of this spatial set-up is projected as moving images on the wall, changing in colour and appearance over time.

=== Publications ===
Since 2004 Barba has been publishing a series of printed editions parallel to her films as another form to express and dismantle the cinematic organism. She conjugates its repertoire while she disbands and defines the relationships and hierarchies between image and word and like between image and viewer anew. The series Printed Cinema which won the artist book award 2006 at the Ontario Association of Art Galleries is published for specific exhibition spaces and accompanies her films as secondary literature for a limited time. The printed editions present an extended and free form of the exhibited film which reveal the filming process including research material and unused filmic fragments. The edition exists beyond the duration of the film. The filmic projection is translated into printed material and confronted with its conditions, materiality and temporality. Through the comparison of both media, the emphasis on image, language and text and their relationships and overlapping themes are shifted into a new light.

Barba has published several monographic books, including her last one: “On the Anarchic Organization of Cinematic Spaces – Evoking Spaces beyond Cinema” 2021 which develops a new thinking by destabilising traditional cinema structures.

=== Awards (selected) ===
- PIAC - Prix International d’Art Contemporain (International Contemporary Art Prize), Fondation Prince Pierre de Monaco (2016)
- Experimental Film Award (Bending to Earth), 24th Curtas Vila do Conde International Film Festival (2016)
- No Violence Award, 54th Ann Arbor Film Festival (2016)
- Experimental Film Award (From Source to Poem), 25th Curtas Vila do Conde International Film Festival (2017)
- Italian Council, 3rd Edition, Ministry of Cultural Heritage and Activities and Tourism, Rome (2018)
- The Calder Prize, Calder Foundation, New York (2020)
- The Zurich Art Prize (2026), awarded annually by Museum Haus Konstruktiv and Zurich Insurance Group Ltd

.
