= Groenveld =

- Village
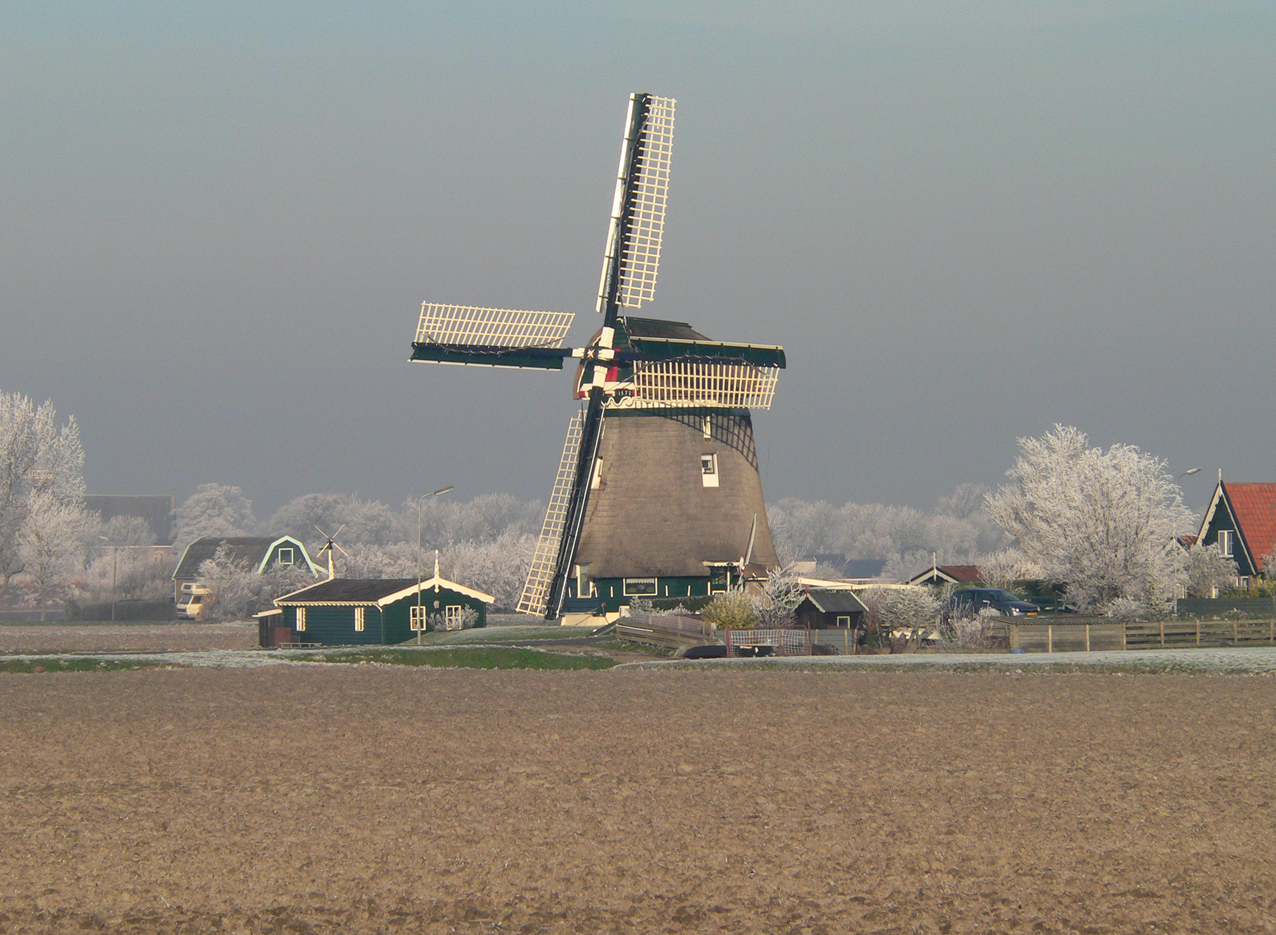
- The windmill in Groenveld

- Location in the Netherlands Location in the province of North Holland in the Netherlands
- Coordinates: 52°46′N 4°47′E
- Country: Netherlands
- Province: North Holland
- Municipality: Schagen

Area
  - Total: 3.41 km^{2} (1.32 sq mi)
- Elevation: −0.7 m (−2.3 ft)

Population (2025)
  - Total: 175
  - Density: 51.3/km^{2} (133/sq mi)
- Time zone: UTC+1 (CET)
  - Summer (DST): UTC+2 (CEST)
- Postal code: 1744
- Dialing code: 0224

Groenveld is a village in the Dutch province of North Holland. It is a part of the municipality of Schagen, and lies about 11 km north of Heerhugowaard and 2 km south of the town of Schagen.

== History ==
Groenveld was first mentioned in 1478 AD as "Groenvelt". The main street in the village, called "Groenveldsdijk", references to the dike that the village was built upon. The old windmill, called De Groenvelder, dates back to the early 16th century and was built to keep the surrounding land, in Dutch called Polder, dry from flooding and heavy rainfall. The Mill is still in use till present day.

Groenveld is located on the edge of the medieval land in the north-east that surrounds Schagen and the modern land in the southwest, which was created by polders since the early 17th century. In the nearby area, archaeological finds have been dated back till the 12th century and show human domestic activity of over 800 years old. The southwestern part of Groenveld has been marked as a "Territory with high archaeological values" and is protected by law.

Groenveld used to be part of the Sint Maarten administration area. In the 20th century, Groenveld became part of the municipality Harenkarspel. On 1 January 2013, Groenveld became part of the municipality of Schagen.

== Notable people ==
Groenveld is retired speed skater Arie Eriks's birthplace.
