= Arie Johannes Lamme =

Dutch painter (1812–1900)

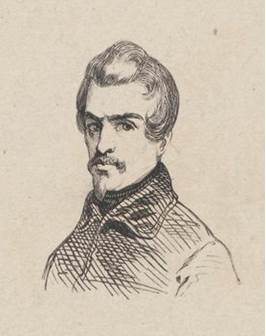
Arie Johannes Lamme by an unknown artist (1842)

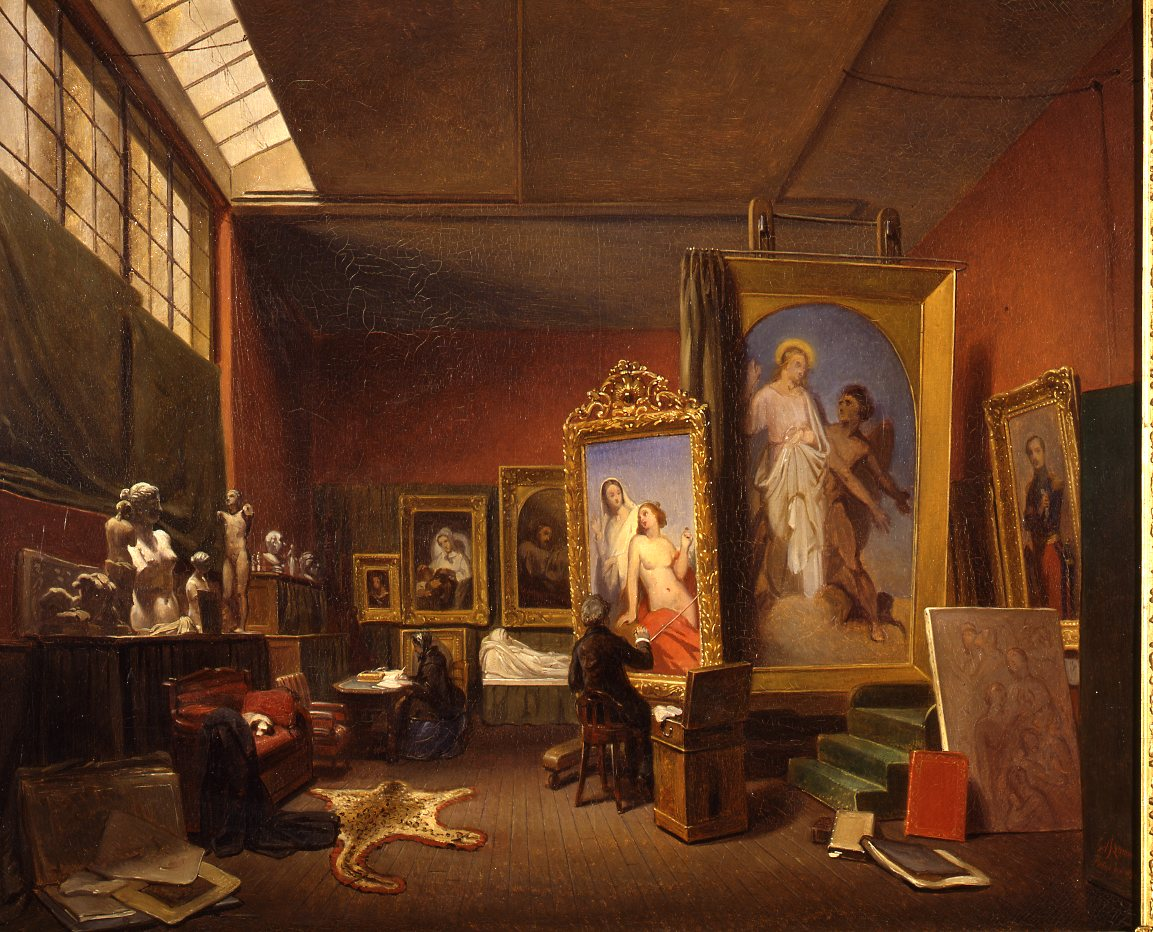
The Big Studio.

Arie Johannes Lamme, also spelled Ary (27 September 1812, Dordrecht — 25 February 1900, Berg en Dal) was a Dutch painter, etcher, lithographer, art dealer and museum director. He specialized in genre scenes and historical works.

== Biography ==
His father was the art dealer Arnoldus Lamme. He originally studied with his father, then went to Paris at the age of seventeen, where he studied with his cousins, Ary and Hendrik Scheffer.

In 1845, while in Paris, he won a gold medal for his interior portraits. Two years later, he and his father worked for the city of Rotterdam, evaluating paintings that had been bequeathed to the city by Frans Jacob Otto Boijmans, a noted art collector.

Those paintings formed the basis of the collection at the Museum Boijmans Van Beuningen, and Lamme was named the first Director in 1849. He was also involved in the creation of the Museum Fodor and became an honorary board member there. In 1863, he compiled a catalog of the Fodor's holdings.

That same year, King William III named him a Ridder in the Order of the Oak Crown. In 1870, he resigned his position at Boijmans and was named Honorary Director. He was succeeded by his son, Dirk Arie Lamme and retired to an estate he had purchased in Berg en Dal.
