= Arie Eriks =

Dutch former speed skater (born 1947)

- Eriks during the National Championships in Deventer (1970).

Personal information
- Born: 1 March 1947 (age 79) Groenveld, North Holland, Netherlands
- Years active: 1965–1971 (long-track); 1975–1982 (marathon)

Sport
- Sport: Marathon speed skating
- Events: All-round; Marathons

Arie Eriks (born 1 March 1947) is a Dutch former long-track and marathon speed skater. As a marathon skater, he won the Royal Dutch Skating Federation (Koninklijke Nederlandsche Schaatsenrijders Bond; KNSB) Cup standings twice, in 1979 and 1981.

== Career ==
=== Early years ===
He came from the small North Holland village of Groenveld, which was part of the neighbouring village of Sint Maarten. His father ran a poultry farm. Arie Eriks trained as a carpenter. He skated with the youth squads and finished second at the National Junior B Championships in March 1965, behind Frits Bartling. Later that year, he moved up to the B-division. In January 1966, at the age of eighteen, he won his first senior races. He finished in ninth place at the 1967 Dutch All-round Speed Skating Championships. In January 1967, he participated with the junior team in an international tournament in Inzell, where Eriks emerged as the winner. In May 1967, after two years in the B-squad, he was included in the core squad that trained during the summer months at the CIOS sports institute in Overveen.

=== To the World Championship ===
At the next Dutch All-round Championships, held on 16 and 17 December 1967, Eriks finished sixth in the overall standings after four consistent races. He travelled as a reserve to the European Championships held in Oslo in late January. He was also named as a reserve for the Olympic team competing at the Winter Games in Grenoble. He did not compete in either tournament. However, Eriks was selected for the World All-round Championships held in Gothenburg in late February 1968. Making his début, he joined Jan Bols, Peter Nottet, Ard Schenk, and Kees Verkerk to form the Dutch team. He failed to make the top sixteen. He finished eighteenth in the final standings. His best performance was thirteenth place in the 1500 metres.

=== Dutch record 3000 metres ===
Eriks was supported by a fan club with two hundred members; virtually all the residents of Groenveld belonged to it. On 4 February 1969, he set a Dutch record in the 3000 metres at the Davos rink, clocking a time of 4:20.90. In so doing, he bested Ard Schenk's record – which had stood for only six weeks – by 5.1 seconds. Eriks's record time stood for 24 days, until Kees Verkerk broke the record by 3.2 seconds on 28 February 1969, at the rink in Inzell, Germany. After the Dutch All-round Championships in January 1970, where he finished twelfth, he dropped out of the national squad.

=== Speed skating marathons ===
After no longer being part of the élite squad, Eriks stopped speed skating for several years at the age of 24. In the autumn of 1975, his name reappeared as a B-division marathon skater. He achieved his first podium finish at the Jaap Eden Trophy on 7 November 1976, placing third at the traditional season opener. He won the silver medal at the Dutch marathon speed skating championships on artificial ice on 4 February 1978. Eriks did not often race on natural ice, yet he achieved good results in the few natural-ice classics that he entered. In his début appearance on 21 February 1979, he won the Amstelmeer Marathon in his hometown of Wieringen. A year later, he finished second in the Veluwemeertocht.

=== KNSB Cup ===
On 3 March 1979, Eriks won the KNSB Cup standings for the first time. He dethroned Co Giling, who had won the title three years in a row. That season, he also received the Abe de Vries Trophy for the most combative skater. After finishing fifth in 1980, he won the KNSB Cup again in 1981. Eriks did start the new season in the autumn of 1981. He opened with a fourth-place finish at the Jaap Eden Trophy and soon took the lead in the KNSB Cup standings. During the third marathon on 21 November 1981, he fell and withdrew from the race, stating that he lacked the necessary motivation. He retired in early 1982 and became a board member of the LTC (National Technical Committee) of the KNSB (Royal Dutch Skating Federation), representing marathon skaters.

== Personal bests ==
Distance	Time	Date	Track
500 m	41.60	1 March 1969	(Germany) Inzell
1000 m	1:27.00	18 February 1969	(Norway) Oslo
1500 m	2:07.00	4 February 1969	(Switzerland) Davos
3000 m	4:20.90*	4 February 1969	(Switzerland) Davos
5000 m	7:36.40	8 February 1969	(Switzerland) Davos
10 000 m	15:50.90	9 March 1968	(Germany) Inzell

*Dutch record

== Long-track results ==
Year	NK All-round	WK All-round
1966	NC20 (14e, 25e, 12e, –)	
1967	9e (11e, 10e, 10e, 13e)	
1968	6e (6e, 8e, 6e, 8e)	NC18 (24e, 20e, 13e, –)
1969	8e (8e, 8e, 8e, 10e)	
1970	12e (9e, 11e, 16e, 12e)	

(#, #, #, #) = distance ranking at all-round tournament (500 m, 5000 m, 1500 m, 10 000 m).
NC = did not qualify for the fourth distance

== Marathon speed skating results ==
Year	NK artificial ice	KNSB Cup standing	Jaap Eden Trophy	Amstelmeer Marathon	Veluwemeer- tocht
1976			3rd place, bronze medalist(s)		
1977		7th	7th		
1978	2nd place, silver medalist(s)	7th	5th		
1979	3rd place, bronze medalist(s)	1st place, gold medalist(s)		1st place, gold medalist(s)	
1980		5th	5th		2nd place, silver medalist(s)
1981	3rd place, bronze medalist(s)	1st place, gold medalist(s)	4th		

=== Medal table ===
Championship	Gold (gold)	Silver (silver)	Bronze (bronze)
NK Marathon on artificial ice	0	1	2
