= Aryeh Kosman =

American scholar and professor of philosophy (1935–2021)

Aryeh Kosman (2 July 1935 – 17 June 2021) was a scholar of ancient Greek philosophy and a professor of philosophy at Haverford College. Born in Oakland, California, Louis Aryeh Kosman was always known professionally by his middle name. He earned undergraduate and master's degrees from the University of California, Berkeley, and a PhD from Harvard University. He came to Haverford as an assistant professor in 1962, was promoted to full professor in 1973, and was appointed John Whitehead Professor of Philosophy at Haverford in 1984. He retired in 2010. He was the author of two books on Plato and Aristotle published by the Harvard University Press.

== Publications ==
- Kosman, Louis Aryeh (2013). The Activity of Being: An Essay on Aristotle's Ontology. Harvard University Press. ISBN 978-0-674-07502-3. OCLC 828868932.
- Kosman, Louis Aryeh (2014). Virtues of Thought: Essays on Plato and Aristotle. Harvard University Press. ISBN 978-0-674-41643-7. OCLC 871257935.
