= Arie Altman (Plant Biology and AgBiotech) =

Professor of Agriculture in The Hebrew University, Israel

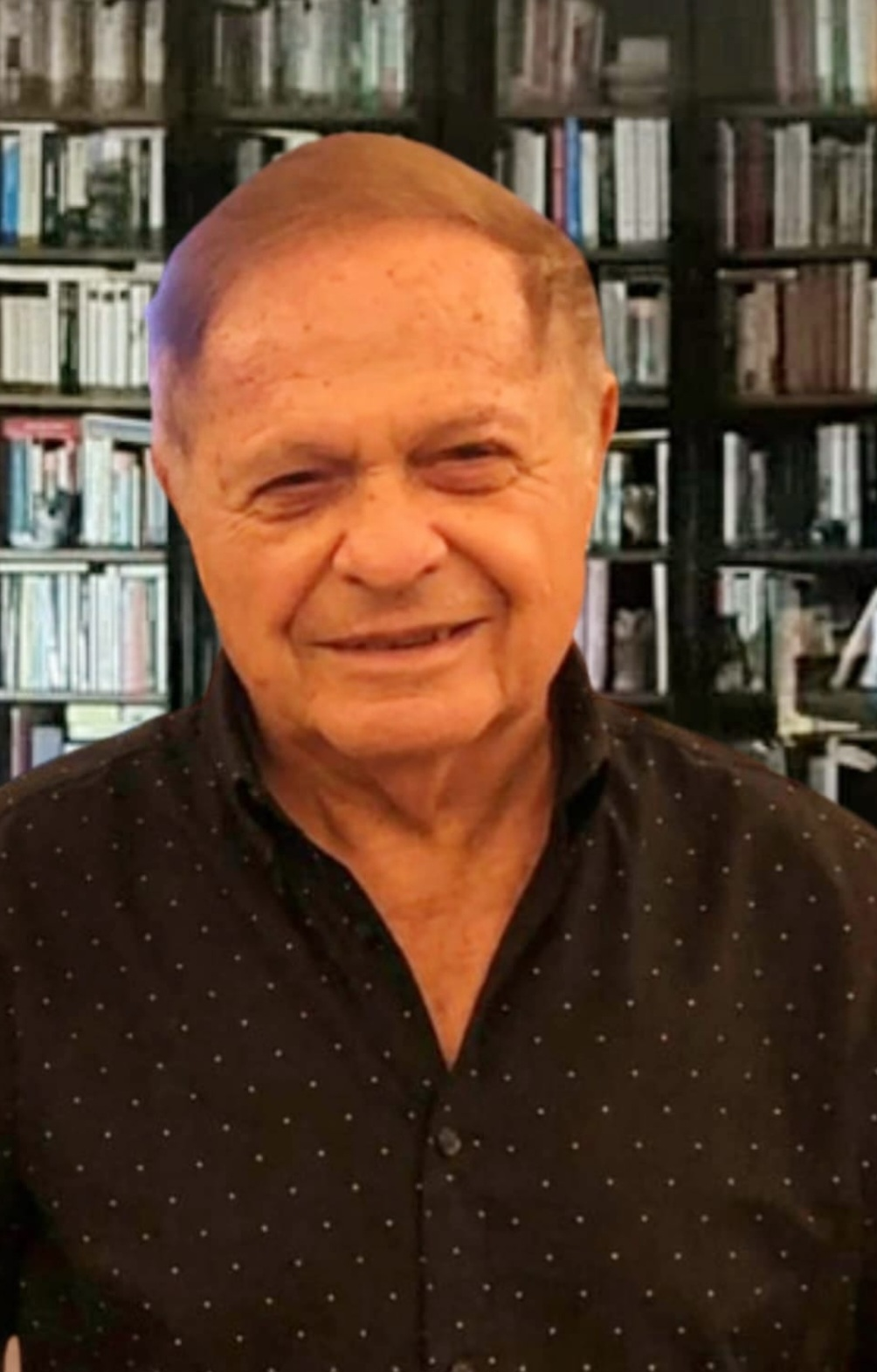
Prof. Arie Altman

Arie Altman (Hebrew: אריה אלטמן; born July 8, 1937) is Professor Emeritus in the Robert H. Smith Faculty of Agriculture, Food and Environment in the Hebrew University of Jerusalem. He has also been a guest professor at Yale University, Roche Institute of Molecular Biology, Scripps Research Institute, San Diego (USA), University College London, Cambridge University (UK), Paris University XI, INRA Versailles (France), Free University Amsterdam (The Netherlands) and Natal University (South Africa).

== Biography ==
Arie Altman was born in Petah Tikva to Hava and Yaakov who immigrated to Israel in 1933 from the Kishinev region.

In 1955, he completed his high-school studies at Ironi Alef High School in Tel Aviv. Afterwards, he joined the army and served in the Nahal Corps in Nitzana and Kibbutz Sde Boker.

When he completed his service, Altman became an advisor under the auspices of the Jewish Agency in cooperative agricultural communities in the Negev.

In the years 1959–1964, Altman studied at the Hebrew University and, in 1964, he completed his M.Sc. degree with honors. His thesis was on morphological and physiological differences between root systems of citrus rootstocks, and was written under the supervision of Professor Shaul Monselise and Professor Kurt Mendel. He continued his doctoral studies at the Hebrew University, which included a year at the University of California, Riverside. In 1969, he submitted his thesis on chloride uptake by the roots of citrus rootstocks in the context of severe problems in irrigation water salinity. This thesis was written under the supervision of Professor Kurt Mendel.

After he received his Ph.D., Altman was appointed Lecturer in the Faculty of Agriculture (1970) and was later promoted to Senior Lecturer (1976), Associate Professor (1982) and Professor (1989).

In 2006, he retired but continued to research, teach, publish, participate in scientific conferences, and serve as a member on scientific committees.

== Personal life ==
Arie Altman was married to Judith (a laboratory researcher in the Kaplan Medical Center, Rehovot) until her death in 2009. He is the father of two: a son (Ron Moshe Altman) and a daughter (Orly Herman).

He lives in Tel Aviv.

== Research ==
For decades, Altman has been involved, active, and has initiated research in developmental biology and the biotechnology of plants and agriculture in Israel and worldwide, with emphasis on plant physiological and molecular responses to drought and salinity stress (forest trees and agricultural plants), plant tissue culture and propagation, and initiating methods of genetic engineering and regeneration of several of plant species. Recently, he has been involved in plant Gene-Culture Coevolution and Niche Construction within the framework of the Extended Evolutionary Synthesis. As a pioneer in these fields, Altman has made a major contribution to the development of agricultural biotechnology, abiotic stress tolerance and plant tissue culture in Israel and worldwide.

=== Plant response to drought and salinity stress ===
To elucidate plant response to abiotic stress (drought and salinity), several physiological parameters (including salt uptake, growth responses, transpiration, photosynthesis involvement of polyamines, and hormonal changes) were studied in poplar and tomato plants and in Arabidopsis and Thellungiella halophilla. Additionally, a novel molecular mechanism was discovered through the isolation of a new heat-stable dodecamer protein (SP1) that was isolated and crystalized. Its unique structure and function was established, and the gene was isolated and used in transformation experiments.

=== Plant tissue cultures and genetic engineering ===
Tissue culture procedures and plant regeneration patterns (including arge-scale micropropagation) were devised and established for poplar, pine, garlic, tomato, and somatic embryos of celery. In this framework, methods for genetic engineering (using A. tumefaciens and A. rhizogenes) were developed for poplar, tomato, and other plants.

=== Plant genetics and evolution–human culture–niche construction coevolution ===
In his pioneering research in Israel, Arie Altman explores the Extended Evolutionary Synthesis theory (EES) with respect to plants and agricultural practices, while previously it had been discussed mainly with respect to humans and animals (and plant domestication). Studying several plant-specific case studies, he proposes that specific cases of plant domestication and all breeding technologies and agricultural procedures of crop plants, both traditional and novel molecular technologies, are associated with all three elements of the EES: human cumulative cultural evolution, gene-culture coevolution, and specific niche construction.

== Academic teaching ==
In 1974, Altman began teaching two basic courses for B.Sc. students: “Biology of Plant Propagation” and “Nursery Management.” In a period of over 35 years, more than 2,800 students - who are now agricultural trainers, nursery managers, researchers, and teachers - took part in these two courses.

In 1980, together with his colleagues, he founded the first course in Israel on “Plant tissue culture” and “Plant and agricultural biotechnology” for M.Sc. and Ph.D. students. Hundreds of students participated in these courses, some of whom laid the foundation for the industry of plant micropropagation and other agricultural biotechnologies in Israel and abroad. He later developed and taught the advanced “Biotechnology in Agriculture” course as part of the Inter-Faculty Biotechnology Department in the Hebrew University, including the scientific and ethical aspects of use of genetically engineered food.

In 2012, he began to teach a new course on “Gene-culture coevolution in Agriculture” at the Hebrew University and was invited to teach a similar course to advanced students as a guest professor in the Faculty of Humanities at Tel Aviv University.

== Additional academic positions ==
- 1979–1983: Founder and President of the Israeli Society for Plant Propagation
- 1992–1998: Director of the Otto Warburg Center for Agricultural Biotechnology in the Hebrew University
- 1994–1998: President of the International Association of Plant Biotechnology (IAPB)
- 1993–2024: Chief member of the Committee for Transgenic (Engineered) Plants, Ministry of Agriculture
- 2000–2003: Member of the National Committee for Biotechnology, Ministry of Science
- 1999–2005: Founder, and first director of the Institute of Plant Sciences and Genetics in Agriculture in the Hebrew University
- 2013–2021: Guest professor at Tel Aviv University in the School of Cultural Studies in the Faculty of Humanities
- 2013–Present (2024): Member of the Academic Council of the Open University of Israel
- 2016, 2019, 2022, 2024: Honorary Senior Research Associate at University College, London (UK)
- 2022: Research Associate at Cambridge University (UK).
- Over the years: Scientific editor and editorial committee member of 10 international scientific journals

== Publications ==
=== Books ===
- A. Altman, ed. (1998), Agricultural Biotechnology, Marcel Dekker, Inc., New York.
- A. Altman and Y. Waisel, eds. (1997), The Biology of Root Formation and Development, Plenum Press, N.Y., USA.
- Altman, A. and M. Ziv, eds. (1997), Horticultural Biotechnology: In Vitro Culture and Breeding, Acta Horticulturae 447, Wageningen, The Netherlands.
- A. Altman, M. Ziv and S. Izhar, eds. (1999), Plant Biotechnology and In Vitro Biology in the 21st Century, Kluwer Academic Publishers, Dordrecht, The Netherlands.
- Altman A. and P. Hasegawa (2012), Plant Biotechnology and Agricultural Prospects for the 21st Century, Elsevier Publishers, and Academic Press, San Diego, USA. The book was also published in Chinese (2018) and Mongolian (2023).

=== Selected articles ===
As of today, Altman has published some 200 scientific articles and chapters in edited books.

- Nadel, B.L., A. Altman and M. Ziv (1990). Regulation of large-scale somatic embryogenesis in Celery. Acta Horticulturae. 280:75-82.
- Tzfira, T., C. S. Jensen, A. Vainstein and A. Altman (1997). Transformation and regeneration of transgenic aspen plants via shoot formation from stem explants. Physiologia Plantarum. 99: 554-561.
- Wang, W.G., D. Pelah, T. Alergand, O. Shoseyov and A. Altman (2002). cDNA cloning, expression and characterization of SP1, an oligomeric water-stress responsive boiling stable protein. Plant Physiology 130: 865-875.
- Vinocur, B. and A. Altman (2005). Recent advances in engineering plant tolerance to abiotic stress: achievements and limitations. Current Opinion in Biotechnology 16: 1-10.
- Antoine Harfouche, Richard Meilan and Arie Altman (2014). Molecular and physiological responses to abiotic stress in forest trees and their relevance to tree improvement. Tree Physiology 34: 1181-1198. (Special issue, Invited Review).
- Moshelion, M. and A. Altman (2015). Current challenges and future perspectives of plant and agricultural biotechnology. Invited Opinion Review, Trends in Biotechnology 33: 1-6.
- Harfouche A, Jacobson DA, Kainer D, Romero JC, Harfouche AH, Scarascia-Mugnozza G, Moshelion M, Tuskan GA, Keurentjes J and Altman A (2019). Accelerating climate resilient plant breeding by applying next generation artificial intelligence. Trends in Biotechnology 37: 1217-1235.
- Altman A., Shennan S. and Odling-Smee, J. (2022). Gene-culture coevolution and breeding of ornamental plants is a specific aesthetics-driven socio-cultural niche. Trends in Plant Science. 27: 124-138.

=== Patents ===
Two patents are registered in Altman’s name:

- Wang, W., Pelah, D., Alegrand, T., Pouny, Y., Marton, I., Wolf, A., Shoseyov, O., Altman, A. (2007). Denaturant stable and/or protease resistant, chaperone-like oligomeric proteins, polynucleotides encoding same, their uses and methods of increasing a specific activity thereof. USA Patent 7,253,341.
- Wolf, A., Pouny, Y., Marton, I., Dgany, O., Altman, A., Shoseyov, O. (2007). Sp1 Polypeptides, Modified Sp1 Polypeptides And Uses Thereof. Patent: Wo/2007/007325.
