= Arie Vermeer =

Dutch footballer

Personal information
- Full name: Adrianus Vermeer
- Date of birth: 17 July 1922
- Place of birth: Rotterdam, Netherlands
- Date of death: 16 December 2013 (aged 91)
- Place of death: Rotterdam, Netherlands
- Position: Defender

Youth career
- 1940–1942: Excelsior

Senior career*
Years	Team	Apps	(Gls)
1942–1956	Excelsior	278	

International career^{‡}
1946	Netherlands	1	(0)
- * Club domestic league appearances and goals as of 17 December 2013 ‡ National team caps and goals as of 17 December 2013

Arie Vermeer (17 July 1922 – 16 December 2013) was a Dutch football player.

== Club career ==
Vermeer made his debut for Excelsior on 4 October 1942 against Neptunus and played 278 matches in 13 seasons for the club. Honours include promotion to the former Dutch Eerste Klasse in 1946 and 1952.

== International career ==
Vermeer earned his one and only cap for the Netherlands in a November 1946 friendly match against England. He is one of only 4 Excelsior players to play for the Netherlands.

== Retirement and death ==
During and after his football career, he owned a butcher shop in Rotterdam for 60 years. He died after a short illness on 16 December 2013.
