= Arieh Ben-Naim =

Israeli chemist

Arieh Ben-Naim (Hebrew: אריה בן-נאים; Jerusalem, 11 July 1934) is a professor of physical chemistry who retired in 2003 from the Hebrew University of Jerusalem. He has made major contributions over 40 years to the theory of the structure of water, aqueous solutions and hydrophobic-hydrophilic interactions. He is mainly concerned with theoretical and experimental aspects of the general theory of liquids and solutions. In recent years, he has advocated the use of information theory to better understand and advance statistical mechanics and thermodynamics.

== Contributions to the theory of liquids ==
Books written by Arieh Ben-Naim:

- Water and Aqueous Solutions: Introduction to a Molecular Theory. 1974, ISBN 030630774X (out of print).
- Hydrophobic Interactions. 1980, ISBN 978-0-306-40222-7.
- Molecular Theory of Solutions. 2006, ISBN 978-0-19-929970-6.
- Molecular Theory of Water and Aqueous Solutions: Understanding Water. 2009, ISBN 978-981-283-760-8.
- Molecular Theory of Water and Aqueous Solutions, Part II: The role of Water in Protein Folding, Self assembly and Molecular Recognition, World Scientific (2011). ISBN 9789814350532
- Alice’s Adventures in Water-Land, World Scientific (2011). ISBN 978-981-4338-96-7
- The Protein Folding Problem and its Solutions, World Scientific (2013) ISBN 9789814436366
- Alice’s Adventures in Molecular Biology, World Scientific (2013). ISBN 9789814417259
- Myths and Verities in Protein Folding Theories, World Scientific (2016). ISBN 9789814725996

== Contributions to statistical mechanics in terms of information theory ==
In 2017, Ben-Naim posted three articles in arXiv. In those articles, three radical ideas were introduced into a field which is considered as classical. The ideas followed from the new definition of entropy based on Shannon's measure of information. The three ideas are, briefly, as follows.

First, there is no relationship between either entropy or the second law of thermodynamics and the so called arrow of time. This false association between the Second Law and time was first suggested by Arthur Eddington. Also the Boltzmann's H-Theorem is not about the time dependence of the entropy, but the time dependence of the Shannon's measure of information. In this respect Boltzmann erred in interpreting his (-)H function as entropy.

Second, the application of the concept of entropy to the entire universe is unwarranted. This association has its origin in Clausius' statement that the entropy of the World always increases. Clausius, who is credited for the formulation of the second law, did not and could not understand the molecular interpretation of entropy. Unfortunately, the application of the concept of entropy to the entire universe features in many textbooks and in popular science books. This erroneous application is discussed in great detail in Ben-Naim's recent books: The Briefest History of Time, Entropy, the Truth the whole Truth and nothing but the Truth, and in Information, Entropy, Life and the Universe.

Third, the application of entropy and the Second Law to living organisms is totally unwarranted. The most famous statement about entropy and life was made by Erwin Schrödinger, in his book What is Life?. In this book, Schrödinger not only discusses entropy and life and associates entropy with disorder, he also "invents" the concept of "negative entropy," which was later renamed negentropy by Léon Brillouin. This erroneous application is further discussed in Ben-Naim's books.

Ben-Naim is a modern antagonist of the term entropy. He advocates abandoning the word entropy altogether, and replacing it with "missing information". He also indicates that the Kelvin temperature scale artificially introduces the units of thermodynamic entropy. Because this temperature scale was introduced before the atomic, microscopic nature of matter was widely accepted, the Boltzmann constant was necessary. S = k_{B}log(W) could be expressed simply as S = log(W), if the energy units for temperature k_{B}T were used.

An example of the insight that information theory can bring to statistical mechanics is the rederivation of the Sackur-Tetrode equation. It results from stacking the missing information due to four terms: positional uncertainty, momenta uncertainty, quantum mechanical uncertainty principle and the indistinguishability of the particles.

Books written by Arieh Ben-Naim on entropy and statistical mechanics include:

- Entropy Demystified: The Second Law Reduced to Plain Common Sense, World Scientific (2008) ISBN 9789812832252
- A Farewell to Entropy. Statistical Thermodynamics Based on Information, World Scientific (2008). ISBN 978-981-270-706-2
- Discover Entropy and the Second Law of Thermodynamics, World Scientific (2010). ISBN 978-981-4299-75-6
- Entropy and the Second Law: Interpretation and Misss-Interpretationsss (2012). ISBN 978-9-814-40755-7.
- Statistical Thermodynamics, with Applications to Life Sciences, World Scientific (2014) ISBN 9789814578202
- Discover Probability; How to Use it, How to Avoid Misusing it and How it Affects Every Aspect of Your Life, World Scientific (2014). ISBN 9789814616317
- Information, Entropy, Life and the Universe. What we know and what we do not know, World Scientific (2015) ISBN 9789814651677
- The Briefest History of Time: The History of Histories of Time, And the misconstrued association between Entropy and Time, World Scientific (2016). ISBN 978-9814749848
- Entropy, The Truth, the Whole Truth and Nothing but the Truth, World Scientific (2016) ISBN 9789813147669
- Modern Thermodynamics, World Scientific (2016) ISBN 9789813200760
- The Four Laws that do not Drive the Universe, For the Curious and intelligent, World Scientific (2017) ISBN 978-981-3223-47-9
