= Depot Museum Boijmans Van Beuningen =

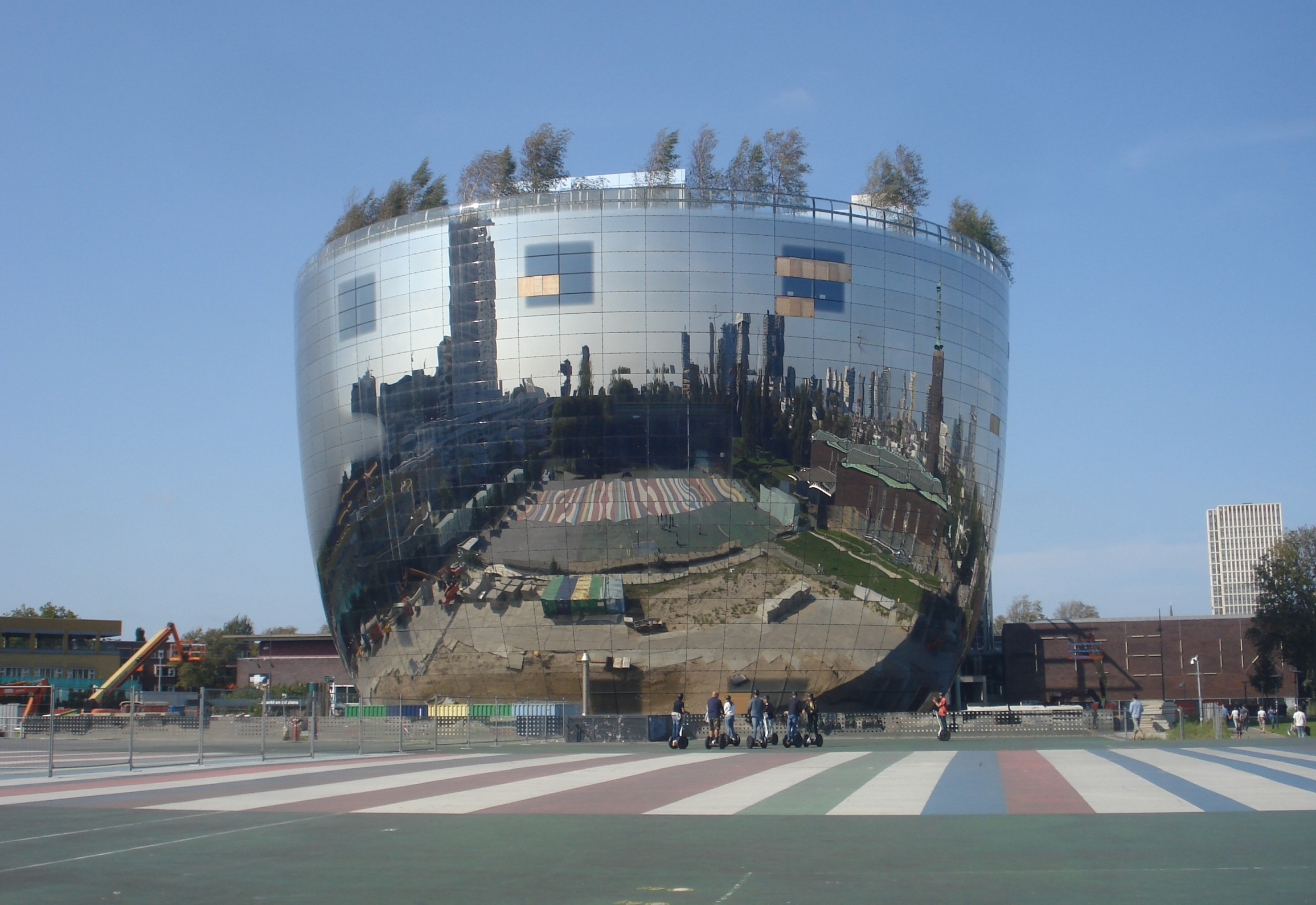
- Skyline Depot Museum Boijmans Van Beuningen
- Established: 2021; 5 years ago
- Location: Rotterdam, The Netherlands
- Coordinates: 51°54′50″N 04°28′17″E
- Type: Art museum
- Collection size: 151,000 items
- Architect: MVRDV
- Website: www.boijmans.nl/depot

Depot Boijmans Van Beuningen (initially called 'het Collectiegebouw' (Collection Building), popularly called 'The Pot') is an art depot of Museum Boijmans Van Beuningen in Rotterdam. It is the first publicly accessible art depot in the world.

== Design ==
The building is a 39.5 meter high, bowl-shaped building that is covered with reflective plates. The plates are more or less contiguous, creating a reduced mirror image of the surrounding environment. To guarantee the privacy of patients of the adjacent Erasmus MC, a number of plates have been made matt on that side. Some rooms where daylight is needed are also fitted with normal glass. An aluminum-coloured IKEA bowl served as inspiration for the shape of the building. The 'Blanda Blank', a slightly shiny serving dish made of stainless steel for €3.99, happened to be on the table as a sugar bowl during preliminary discussions about the design for the building.

Depot Boijmans Van Beuningen was designed by the Dutch architectural firm MVRDV.

== Background and Construction ==
In 2013, there was severe flooding in the previous museum storage space. In the end, the losses were minimal but the risks associated with below sea-level storage were noted.

Rather than create an out of town storage solution, the museum started considering the benefit of an open art depot. The idea of a depot had been circulating since 2007, but the flooding created extra impetus. Of the museum's collection of over 150,000 artworks only 6 to 8% were on show at any time - the vast majority could not be seen by the public. Thus director of the time Sjarel Ex began to conceive of a place where the art not shown in the main museum could still be open to the public.

On November 5, 2015, the Rotterdam city council approved the change to the zoning plan in the Museum Park, allowing the plans for a special art depot to be realised. Formerly, 255 acacia trees grew on the site of the building. According to some experts, they were in bad condition and could survive only if they were moved to the municipal tree depot and transplanted. Others disagreed with that view, saying that the new building would "destroy the park."

The first pile went into the ground on March 17, 2017. The building has seven floors. On the roof is a restaurant with 120 seats. The building contains 1,664 mirror panels with a combined surface of 6,609m^{2}. In addition, there are four restoration studios. Inside, part of the collection is displayed in thirteen display cases. In October 2021, the costs for the building were estimated at over ninety million euros.

The entire deposit collection of Museum Boijmans Van Beuningen is stored here and is publicly accessible, on a total floor area of 15,541m^{2}. More than 151,000 objects are housed together, arranged in fourteen storage compartments with five different climates. Each climate is for material that requires different kind of environmental conditions - a lower temperature, for example, is needed for colour photographs. Financially, the realisation was made possible in part by the De Verre Bergen foundation with a gift of €17 million and a loan of approximately €35 million during the construction phase. The final cost was €94 million. It was officially opened to the public in a ceremony with King Willem-Alexander on November 5, 2021.

The ongoing intention of the museum is that costs will be (partially) recouped from entrance fees and from income from the rental of depot space to private art collectors (15 percent of the floor space intended for art is reserved for that purpose).

== Prizes and Awards ==
On April 29, 2022, the Depot app received a Webby Award in the category Apps and Software, Art, Culture, and Events 2022. On May 12, 2022, the Depot received the Best Building award in the 'Stimulating Environments' category by the Dutch Architectural Firms Association (BNA).

== Criticism and Commentary ==
The building has not been universally loved. Original criticism came from the neighbouring Erasmus Medical Centre. Architectural critic Oliver Wainwright noted that the conical dimensions of the building was not best suited to storing often rectangular artworks. More importantly, he commented that "the truth is that you don't actually get to see much." - most of the artworks are on racks with limited accessibility.

A film of 2023 was more positive. 'DEPOT – Reflecting Boijmans' was the name of 2023 film charting the history, construction and experience of the depot. The movie was described as "an irresistible advert for an extraordinary edifice, in which the sense of artistic and architectural possibility is nothing less than vertiginous." A scientific study of social media engagement in 2023 again demonstrated the iconic popularity of the building, the authors concluding that "the results demonstrate that the exceptional building currently receives more attention on Instagram than the valuable masterpieces stored within it."

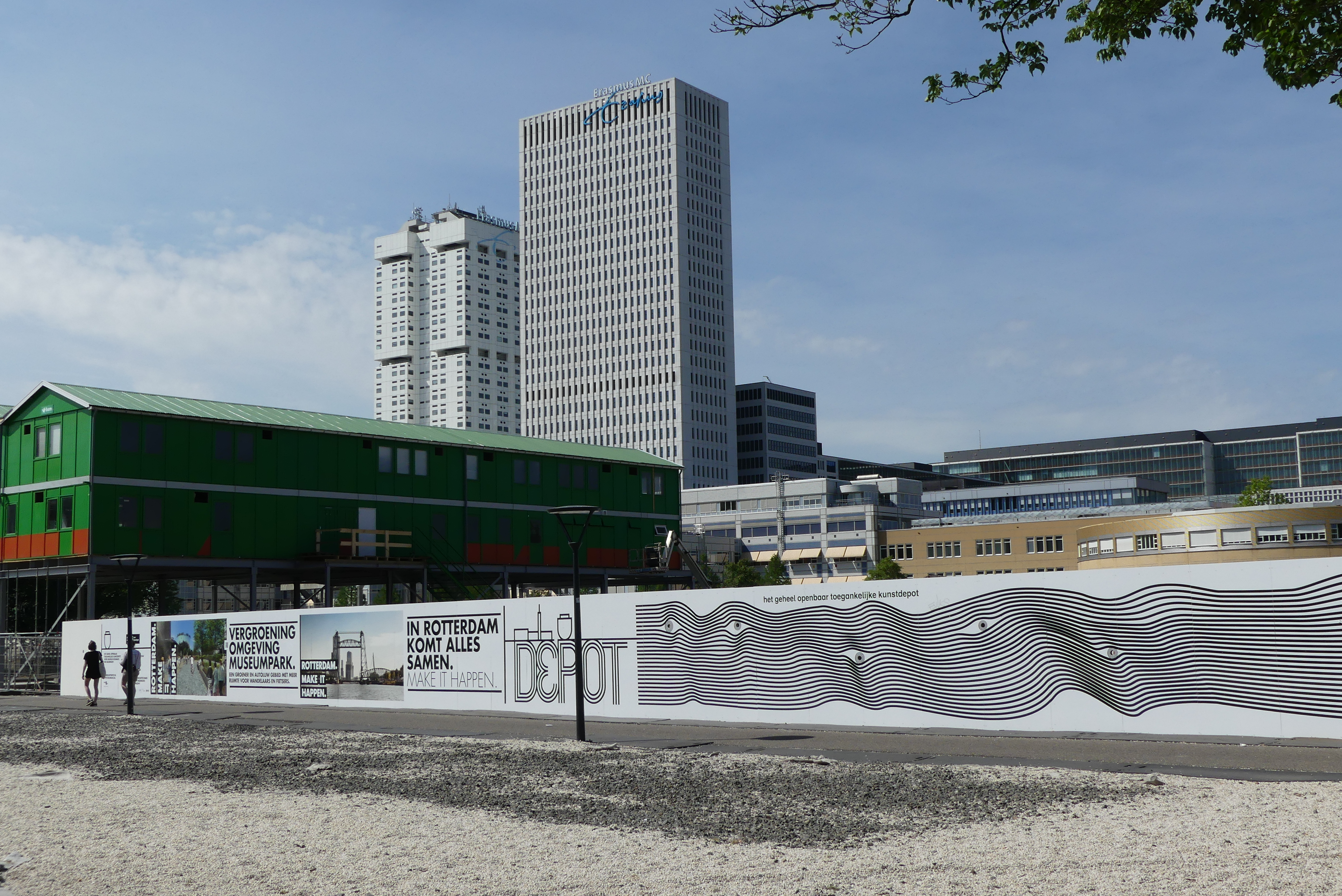
May 2017

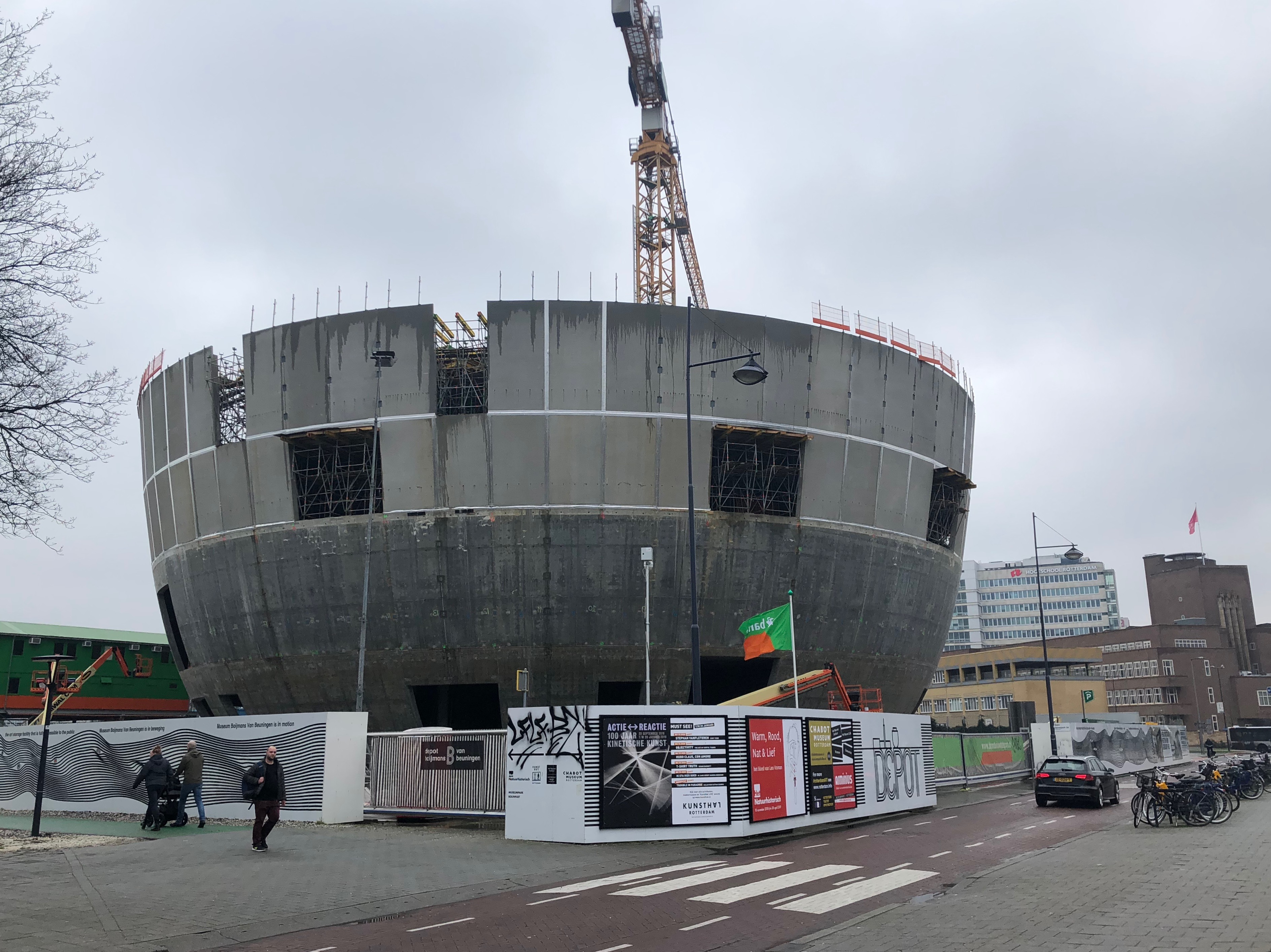
February 2019

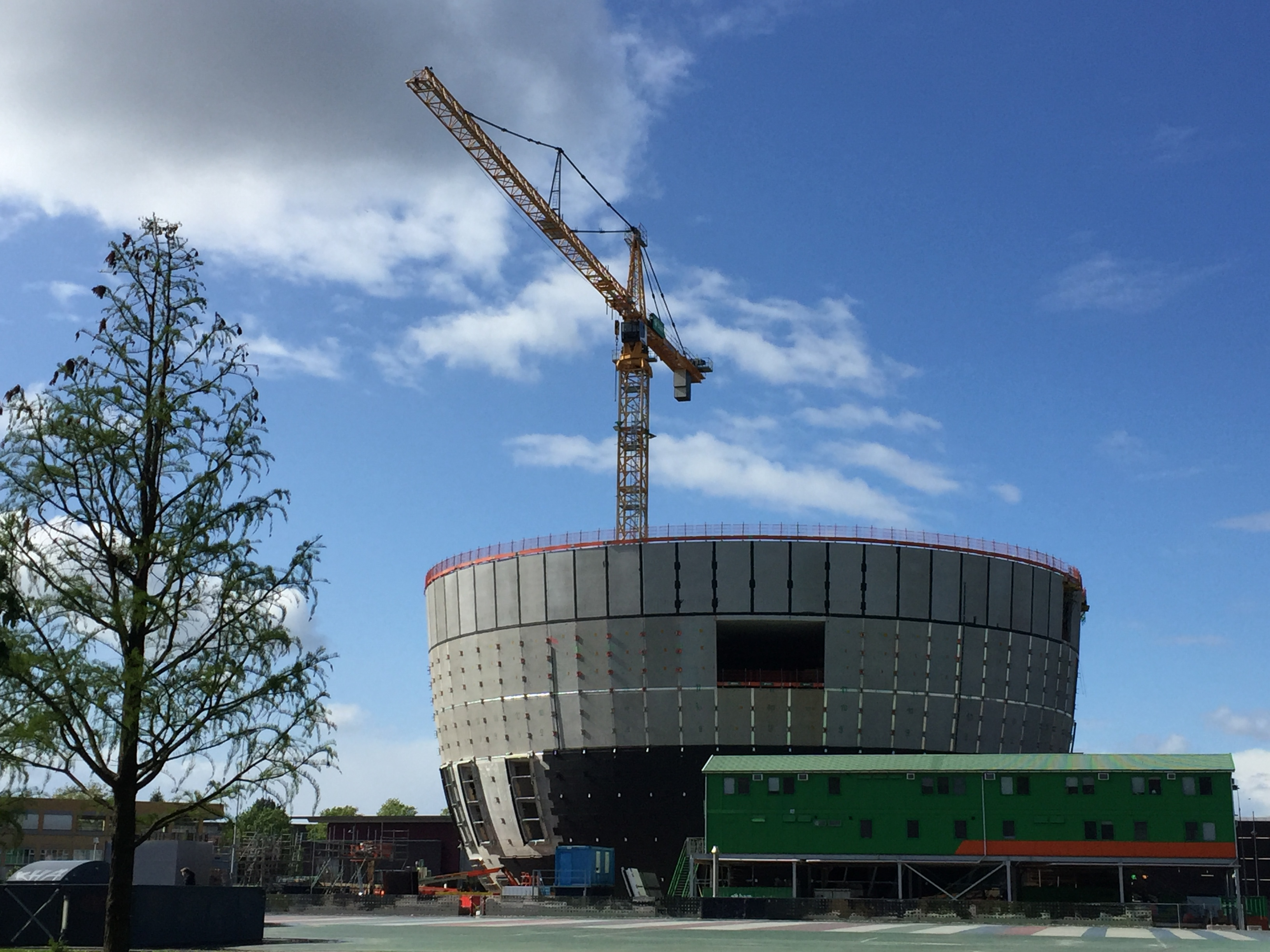
May 2019

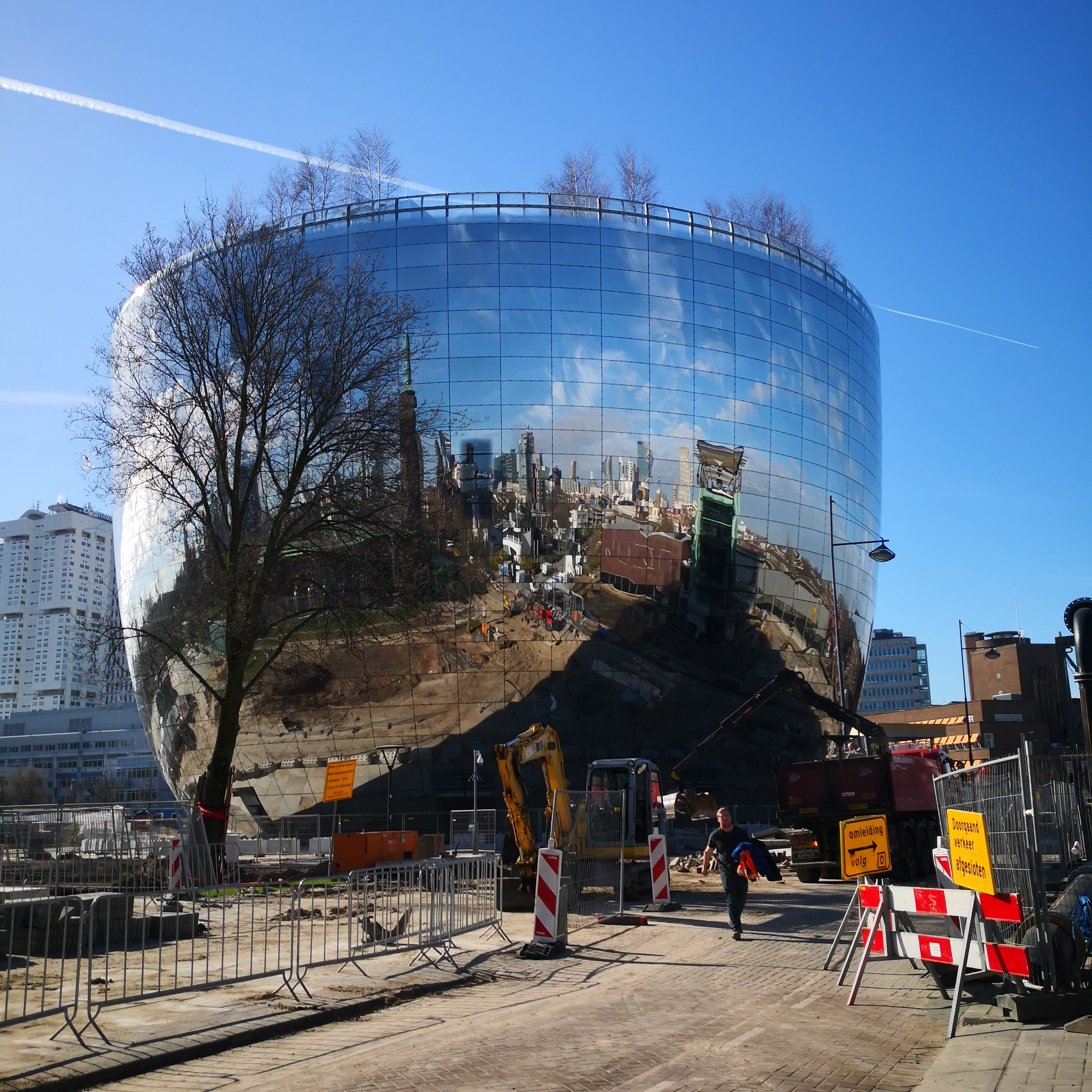
February 2021

== Source ==
- Depot
- Stylish storage: world's first publicly accessible art depot opens in Rotterdam. On: DutchNews.nl.
