= Leonora Arye =

American sculptor and writer (1931–2001)

- Born: May 22, 1931. New York City
- Died: October 8, 2001
- Education: Heidelberg University

Leonora Arye (May 22, 1931 – October 8, 2001) was an American sculptor and writer known for her sculptures representing motherhood and the struggles women faced in the art world. Arye was a New York-based artist and most of her exhibitions were in New York City.

== Education ==
Leonora Arye was born in New York City in 1931. There she took several courses at the Arts Student League, focusing mainly on painting. She was admitted into Heidelberg College, now known as Heidelberg University, where she obtained her bachelor's degree. After graduating from college, she moved to Mexico for a few years, where she studied at the University of Mexico (UNAM.) Her work was heavily influenced from her time in Mexico and some of her pieces are derived from the indigenous community found there. Arye's learning and studying did not end there, though. She also worked alongside Lorrie Goulet and Hana Geber, who are credited as having brought awareness to women in sculpting. Arye infused Goulet's core beliefs into her own sculptures; both artists' work dealt with motherhood and the struggles female artists face when trying to expand their careers.

== Personal life ==
Arye was married to Leonard Arye, who founded Arye, Lustig & Sassower, P.C., for more than 47 years. On October 8, 2001, Leonora Arye succumbed to with myelodysplastic syndrome (MDS), a rare type of cancer. Arye was survived by her husband, three sons, daughter-in-law, and granddaughter. One of her sons went on to marry and have a son and daughter.

== Selected artworks ==
=== La Madre ===
The Spanish title of this sculpture translates to "The Mother". This is an alabaster sculpture that physically shows a mother holding her child close to her chest. Her woman's is "distorted" to show the struggles of women, especially those coming from a minority background. Arye wanted to show the difficult decision some women faced when deciding what path they wanted to follow, either choosing motherhood or a successful career. According to Latin American Women Artists of the United States, this was particularly true for Arye. After starting a family her career was somewhat hindered.

=== El Rebezo ===
The title of this alabaster sculpture roughly translates to "The Shawl" in English. This sculpture infuses a cultural staple in Latin American culture, the rebozo. This piece of clothing is worn mainly by women and has been referred to as a “powerful symbol of Mexican culture.” Arye portrayed a woman with strong facial features. Often those features are correlated to people of indigenous descent. Her hair is long and flows down her back. This woman shows no fear, and her face is looking up, showing resilience and hope.

=== Amigas ===
This sculpture is composed of three different woods: chestnut, rosewood, and maple. This makes this piece very rare in Arye's collection, as most of her pieces are composed of alabaster. This sculpture shows two grown women holding each other in a caring, intimate way. Yet at the same time there is a sense of distance, because both figures are looking past each other. Per the artist, this sculpture represents women in the art world. Although most female artists help each other throughout their careers there are certain obstacles that could only be crossed individually.

== Awards ==
1. 1987-National Association of Women Artists
2. 1998–1990, Paul Manship Memorial Award
3. 1990-American Artists Professional League Award
4. 1994-Gold Medal, Allied Artists of America
5. 1995-Anna Hyatt Huntington Award

== Exhibitions ==
1. 1980 - Mari Galleries, Mamaroneck, New York.
2. 1984 - Mari Galleries, Mamaroneck, New York.
3. 1986 - Couturier Gallery, Stamford, Connecticut.
4. 1987 - Mari Galleries, Mamaroneck, New York.
5. 1987 - Collection '87, Stamford, Connecticut.
6. 1992 - Hammond Museum, North Salem, New York.
7. 1994 - Mari Galleries, Mamaroneck, New York.

== Bibliography ==
1. Henkens, Robert. Latin American Women Artists Of the United States: The works of 33 Twentieth-Century Women. McFarland, Incorporated Publishers. 2018
