= Arye Rosen =

American biomedical and electrical engineering professor

- Born: Arye Rosen
- Education: B.S. Electrical Engineering; M.S. Engineering; M.Sc. Physiology; Ph.D. Electrical Engineering
- Alma mater: Howard University; Thomas Jefferson University; Johns Hopkins University; Drexel University
- Awards: IEEE Region One Award (1989); Electrical and Computer Engineering Department Distinguished Alumni Award (1997)
- Scientific career
- Fields: Biomedical engineering
- Workplaces: David Sarnoff Research Center; Jefferson Medical College; Drexel University; Saint Peter's University

Arye Rosen is academy professor of biomedical and electrical engineering in the School of Biomedical Engineering, Science and Health Systems at Drexel University in Philadelphia, Pennsylvania and associate vice president at Rowan University and a member of the National Academy of Engineering.

== Education ==
Rosen got his B.S. degree in electrical engineering from Howard University and his M.S. degree in engineering from Johns Hopkins University. Later, he was awarded his M.Sc. in physiology from Thomas Jefferson University and his Ph.D. in electrical engineering from Drexel University.

== Career ==
Rosen's career spent over thirty-six years with the RCA/David Sarnoff Research Center, where he was awarded the rank of Distinguished Member of Technical Staff. His work there centered on the research and development of microwave devices and circuits, microwave optical interaction and high-power semiconductor lasers. For the past forty-five years he has also been engaged in medical research into the use of laser, acoustic and microwave energies for therapeutic medical devices.

Rosen has worked in the Division of Cardiology at Jefferson Medical College since 1969 where he also holds the title of Associate in Medicine and he holds over 60 U.S. patents in the fields of engineering and medicine.

== Personal ==
Rosen has one son, Dr. Harel D. Rosen, a neonatologist and a graduate of Jefferson Medical College, whom he has collaborated with in the founding of the Medical Technology Center for Infants and Children at St. Peter's University Hospital. They also collaborated on engineering a solar-powered blanket used to treat jaundice in developing nations.

== Books ==
- High Power Optically Activated Solid-State Switches (Norwood, MA: Artech House, 1993)
- New Frontiers in Medical Device Technology (New York: Wiley, 1995)
- RF/Microwave Interaction with Biological Tissue (New York: Wiley, 2006)

== Awards and distinctions ==
- IEEE Region One Award (1989)
- IEEE Third Millennium Medal (2000)
- IEEE Microwave Application Award (2000)
- IEEE Distinguished Microwave Lecturer (1997–2000)
- Drexel University College of Engineering, Electrical and Computer Engineering Department Distinguished Alumni Award (1997)
- Member of National Academy of Engineering (2002–present)
- Member of The Franklin Institute's Committee on Science and the Arts (2003–present)
- Member of John Scott Award Advisory Committee
- Member of City of Philadelphia Board of Directors of City Trusts (2004–present)
