= Xiaoma =

American YouTuber (born 1990)

Xiaomanyc
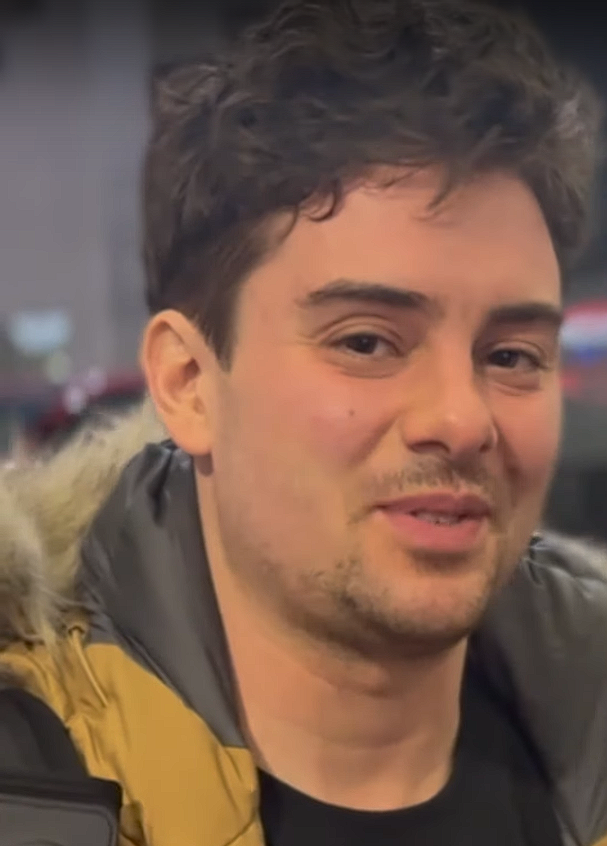
- Smith in 2024
- Born: Arieh Smith; July 20, 1990 (age 36); New York City, U.S.
- Education: University of Chicago
- Occupation: YouTuber
- Years active: 2017–present
- Spouse: Katherine Wong
- Children: 2

YouTube information
- Channel: Xiaomanyc 小马在纽约
- Genre: Languages
- Subscribers: 7.09 million
- Views: 1.69 billion

Chinese name
- Simplified Chinese: 小马在纽约
- Literal meaning: Little pony in New York
- Hanyu Pinyin: Xiǎo mǎ zài niǔ yuē
- Last updated: October 22, 2025
- Website: www.xiaomanyc.com

Arieh Smith (born July 20, 1990), better known as Xiaoma, is an American YouTuber known for his language-oriented channel Xiaomanyc (Chinese: 小马在纽约; pinyin: Xiǎo mǎ zài niǔyuē), where he speaks various languages with people from different cultures. The New York Times credited his channel as one of the most popular YouTube channels in this category. He has been profiled in news publications such as The Independent, The Indian Express, and The Daily Dot.

== Life and career ==
Smith is a native of New York City and grew up speaking English in an Ashkenazi Jewish family. He has a brother. In high school, Smith studied Latin, Hebrew, and Greek. After graduating from high school, he took a basic Mandarin Chinese class during the summer after high school before attending the University of Chicago. He attained a scholarship to study in Beijing, China through a program run by Princeton University, for one year, where he delved deeper into the Mandarin language. Smith graduated from the University of Chicago in 2011.

Smith eventually learned other languages using his own method of memorizing translated versions of varying phrases. He gained popularity on YouTube for his ability to speak Mandarin Chinese, alongside other languages such as Portuguese, French, Spanish, Yiddish, Yoruba, Tamil, Telugu, Navajo, and various Chinese dialects at a basic conversational level. Many of his videos showcase him partaking in diverse ethnic cultures while recording people's reactions to his varying proficiency in foreign languages. His video with fellow YouTuber Frankie Light, where they travel around New York City speaking Mandarin, received 4.2 million views.

Smith has also travelled to Ireland, spending time learning Irish and spoke Welsh when visiting Cardiff in Wales.

In November 2022, Smith interviewed Secretary of State Antony Blinken while Blinken was in Bangkok, Thailand, to attend APEC Thailand 2022.
