= Museum Boijmans Van Beuningen =

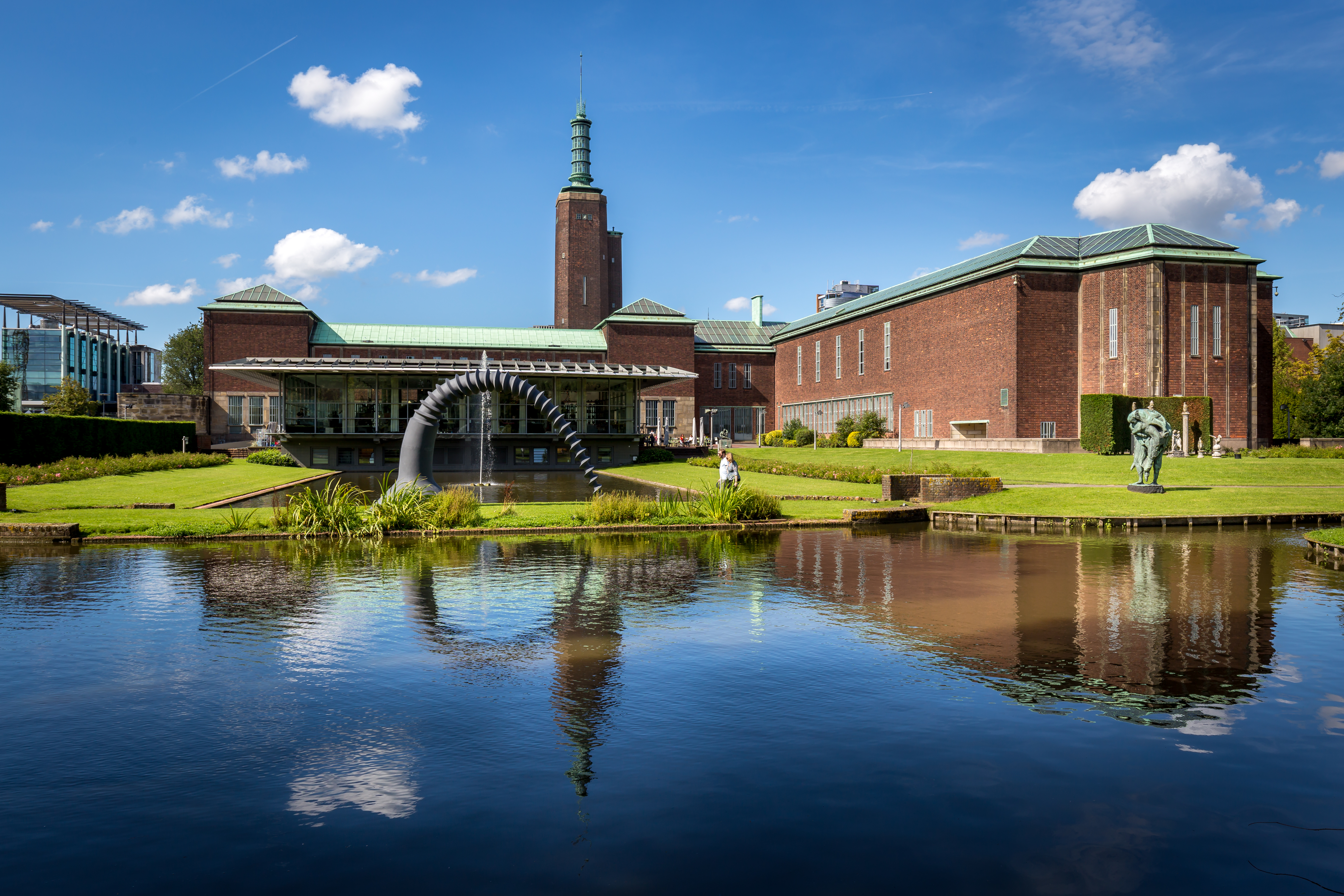
- The south side of the museum in 2017

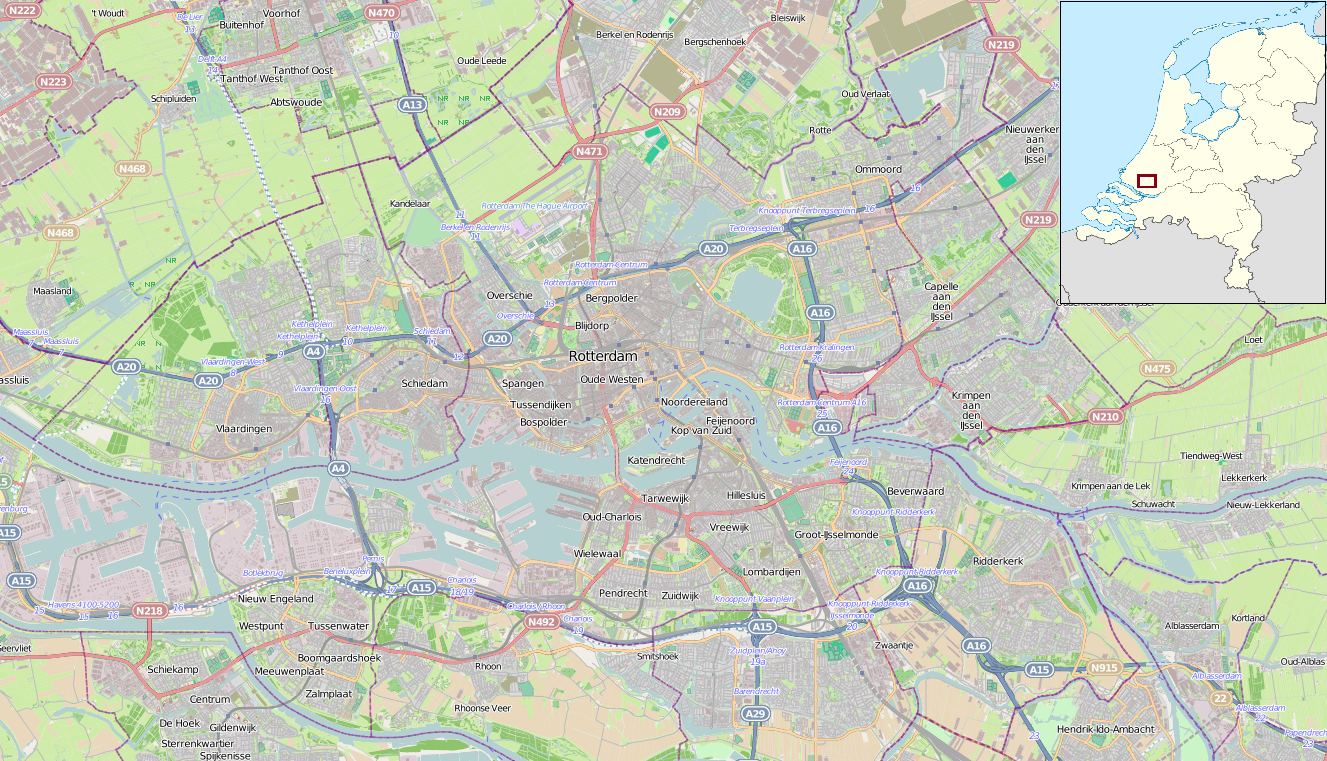
- Location within Rotterdam in the Netherlands
- Interactive fullscreen map
- Established: 3 July 1849
- Location: Museumpark 18–20; Rotterdam, Netherlands
- Coordinates: 51°54′51″N 4°28′24″E
- Type: Art museum
- Visitors: 270,000 (2015 est.)
- Director: Ina Klaassen +
- Website: www.boijmans.nl/en/

Municipal Museum Boijmans Van Beuningen (Dutch pronunciation: [myˈzeːjʏm ˈboːimɑns fɑm ˈbøːnɪŋə(n)]) (Note: In isolation, van is pronounced [vɑn].) is an art museum in Rotterdam in the Netherlands. The name of the museum is derived from its two most important donors, Frans Jacob Otto Boijmans and Daniël George van Beuningen. The museum is located at the Museumpark in the district Rotterdam Centrum, close to the Kunsthal and the Natural History Museum.

The museum opened in 1849. Since its inception, the museum has become the home to over 151,000 artworks. In the collection, ranging from medieval to contemporary art, are works of Rembrandt, Claude Monet, Vincent van Gogh, and Salvador Dalí and specific masterpieces such as the ‘Achilles series’ by Peter Paul Rubens and ‘A Cornfield, in the Background the Zuiderzee’ by Jacob van Ruisdael.

In 2013, the museum had 292,711 visitors and was the 14th most visited museum in the Netherlands. In 2018, the last full year before its long-term closure, there were 284,000 visitors.

The museum has been closed since mid-2019. In 2024, the council of Rotterdam agreed to an ambitious renovation costing 359m Euros. The museum is finally scheduled to reopen in 2030.

== History ==
The museum was established in 1849 as Museum Boijmans, housing the collection of Frans Jacob Otto Boijmans (1767–1847). After agreement between the Rotterdam Council and Boijmans, the Schielandshuis was bought by the Council to exhibit the Boijmans collections. The painter and art dealer, Arie Johannes Lamme, was named the museum's first director. Much of the museum's original collection was destroyed in a fire in 1864. The collection started to be rebuilt and with time the Schielandshuis became too small to fit the growing number of artworks and visitors of Museum Boijmans. A new museum was therefore built in 1929 and opened in Museumpark in 1935. The building was designed by the city architect Adriaan van der Steur (1893-1953).

The collection of businessman Daniël George van Beuningen (1877–1955) was added in 1958, at which point the museum acquired the name Museum Boymans–Van Beuningen. The spelling was changed to 'Museum Boijmans Van Beuningen' in 1996. A representative of the Dutch Jewish community, Ronny Naftaniel, unsuccessfully demanded the removal of Van Beuningen's name because it was alleged that artworks in his collection has been illegally seized from Jewish owners during the Nazi occupation in the Netherlands.

== Architecture ==
=== Van der Steur building ===
In April 1928, Rotterdam Council decided to support a new building for the collection. This would replace the too small building on the Schiedamsedijk. Within a few months the 35 year old Alexander Van der Steur would be commissioned to design the building, in cooperation with the museum director Dirk Hannema.

After tours of European museums and various experiments during the design process, building started in 1931. It was opened on 6 July 1935. Van der Steur considered it his most important work.

Van der Steur believed a museum should serve as a backdrop for art, prioritizing the display and appreciation of the collection. He saw his architecture as a means to enhance, not overshadow, the art it housed: "When I was able to say: This museum is a background for the artworks, I knew for myself that I had succeeded.

The architect was conscious that museums could be tiring - he aimed to create a space conducive to learning and enjoyment. He designed unobtrusive stairwells and incorporated subtle level changes to minimise visitor fatigue: "Museums are tiring... This effort can become torture if we are subjected to poor lighting, impossible stairs, heavy colours on the walls, and a poor grouping of works of art... Only a building that is truly a good museum can meet this need."

Lighting was also important, Van der Steur conducted extensive light studies to ensure optimal illumination of the artworks. His innovative approach to museum lighting was praised by critics and influenced later projects, including the renovation of the Rijksmuseum in 1952.

The museum's design, with its interconnected courtyards, towers, and interplay of materials, revealed Van der Steur's attention to architectural harmony and symbolism. He justified the tower – a controversial element – as an architectural necessity that draws the eye upward, creating a sense of rhythm and grandeur.

Van der Steur's choice of materials, such as the contrasting sandstone and brick, aimed to create a timeless aesthetic that would age gracefully: "...to reinforce the colour effect with the contrast between the two types of stone: from pure grey via yellow-grey to deep red, topped with a copper gutter."

=== Exhibition wing ===
In 1971, an exhibition wing was added. It was designed by the architect Alexander Bodon (1906-1993) with the purpose of showing temporary exhibitions. In 2003 the Flemish architects Robbrecht en Daem added new galleries to the exhibition wing. The new wing was "like a girdle around Bodon's large rooms. In their galleries they used clear and frosted glass, concrete and parts of the original brick wall. This and the library on the street side are the most recent extensions of the museum until now."

The exhibition building was built with three large flexible spaces that could be reconfigured depending on each exhibitions needs. Bodon created a 'new wing' at a time when modern art literally and figuratively required space. The rooms had white and diffused lighting from above. The view of the garden from the large window gave views which reputedly distracted the attention of some visitors from the art. The ceiling which showed the arts' character with details of design meaning in them.

=== Pavilion ===
The Van Beuningen de Vriese Pavilion was built and designed by the Hubert-Jan Henket in 1991 to add the collections from the Beuningen. The pavilion holds the collections of preindustrial household objects. The space of pavilion is very transparent as the building has used the glass and silver-coloured steel roof construction.

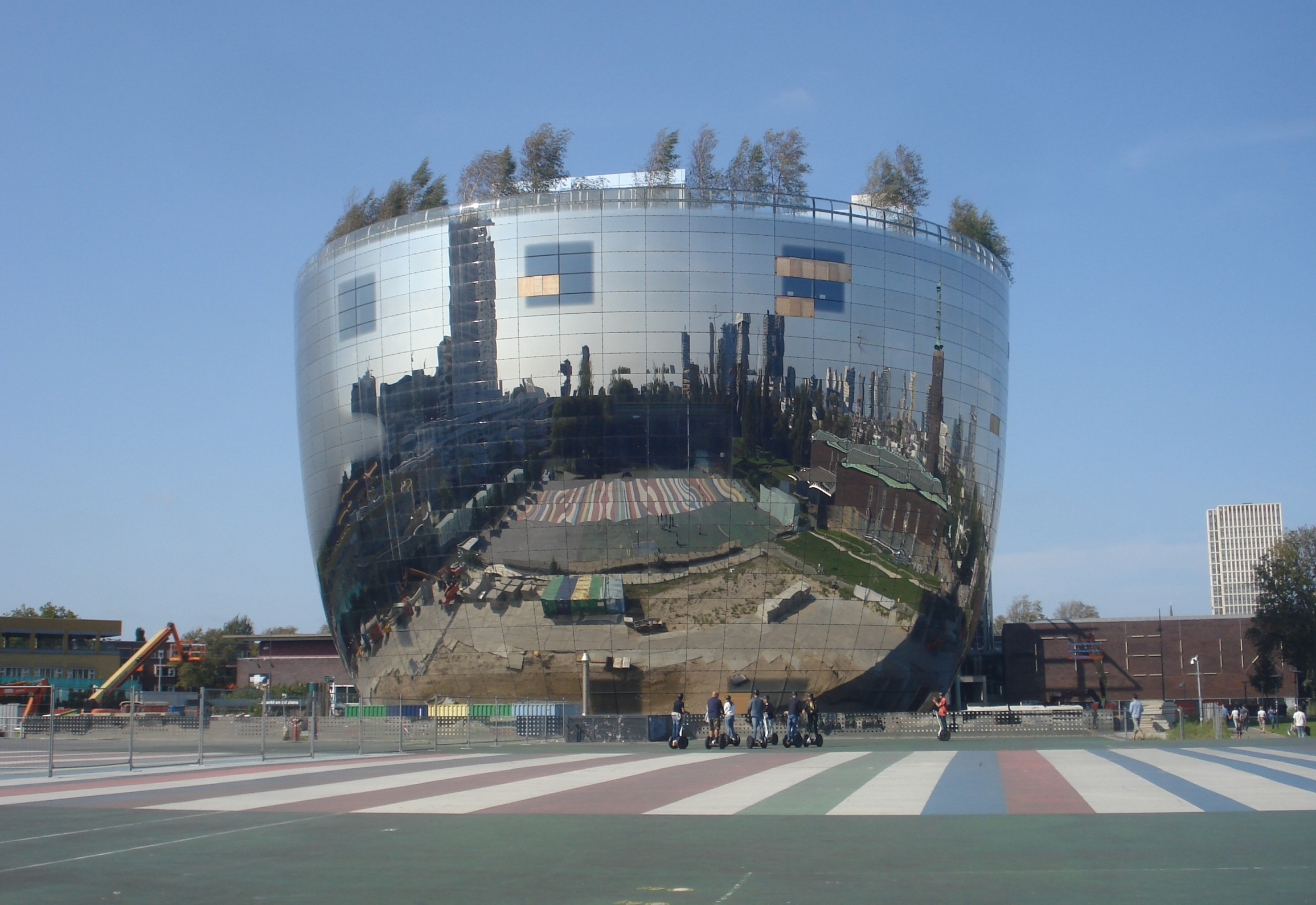
Skyline Depot Museum Boijmans Van Beuningen 2021

=== Depot ===
The construction of Depot Museum Boijmans Van Beuningen was started in 2017 and was officially opened by King Willem-Alexander on November 5, 2021. It is the world's first fully accessible art depot.

The depot was commissioned to give the visitors a sense of the great size of the collections which can be seen from the central staircase and landings. The ground floor of the depot consists of a welcoming entrance area with coffee corner, and is also used for art handlings. The upper floors are for exhibitions spaces. The atrium gallery, which has a glass roof, contains collections from the old buildings. The building was built with sustainability in mind by architects MVRDV. The depot facade is covered by different types of glass with different color code to make the building flexible with the natural lightings. For example, the facade at the roof terrace is coded with pink glass, which is transparent to afford visitors a view of the city and museum from the roof. The building also has a restaurant (Renilde, named after former curator Renilde Hammacher) and a salon (Coert, named after a former director of the Rotterdam Museum Coert Ebbinge Wubben).

== Collection ==
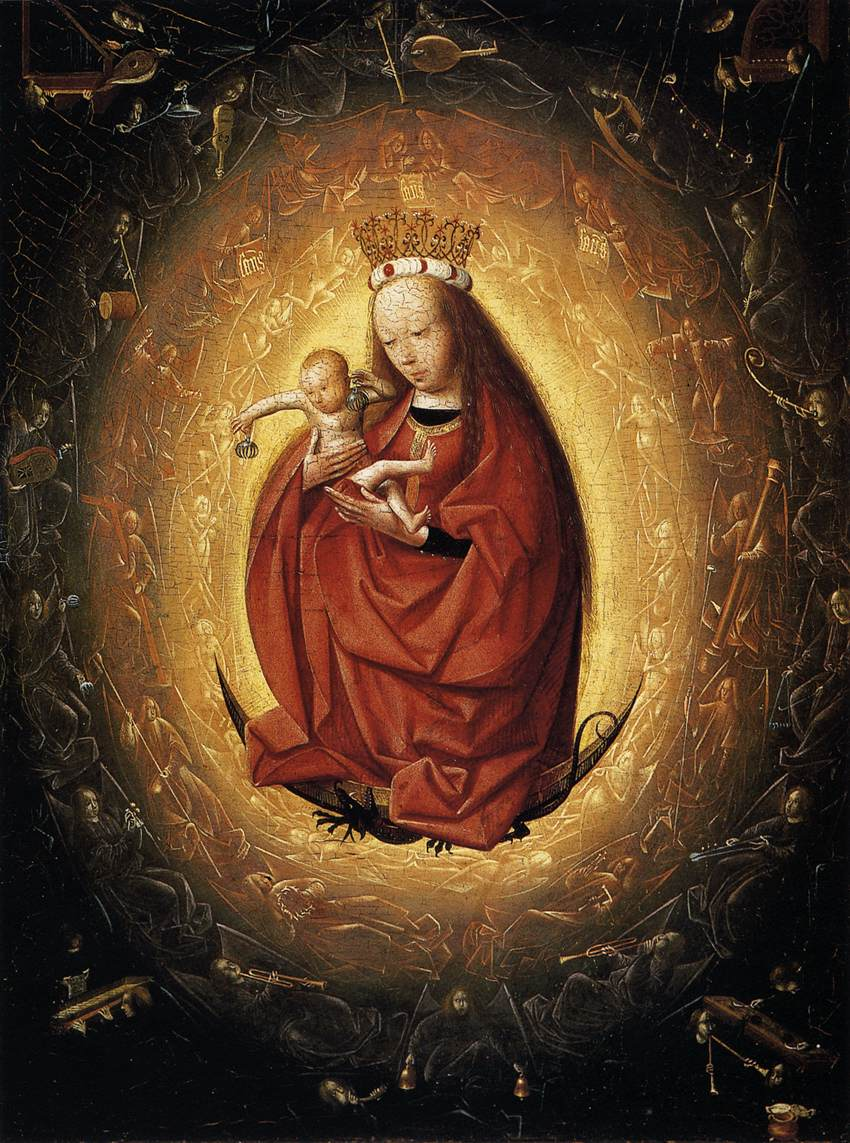
The Glorification of the Virgin (c. 1490–95) by Geertgen tot Sint Jans

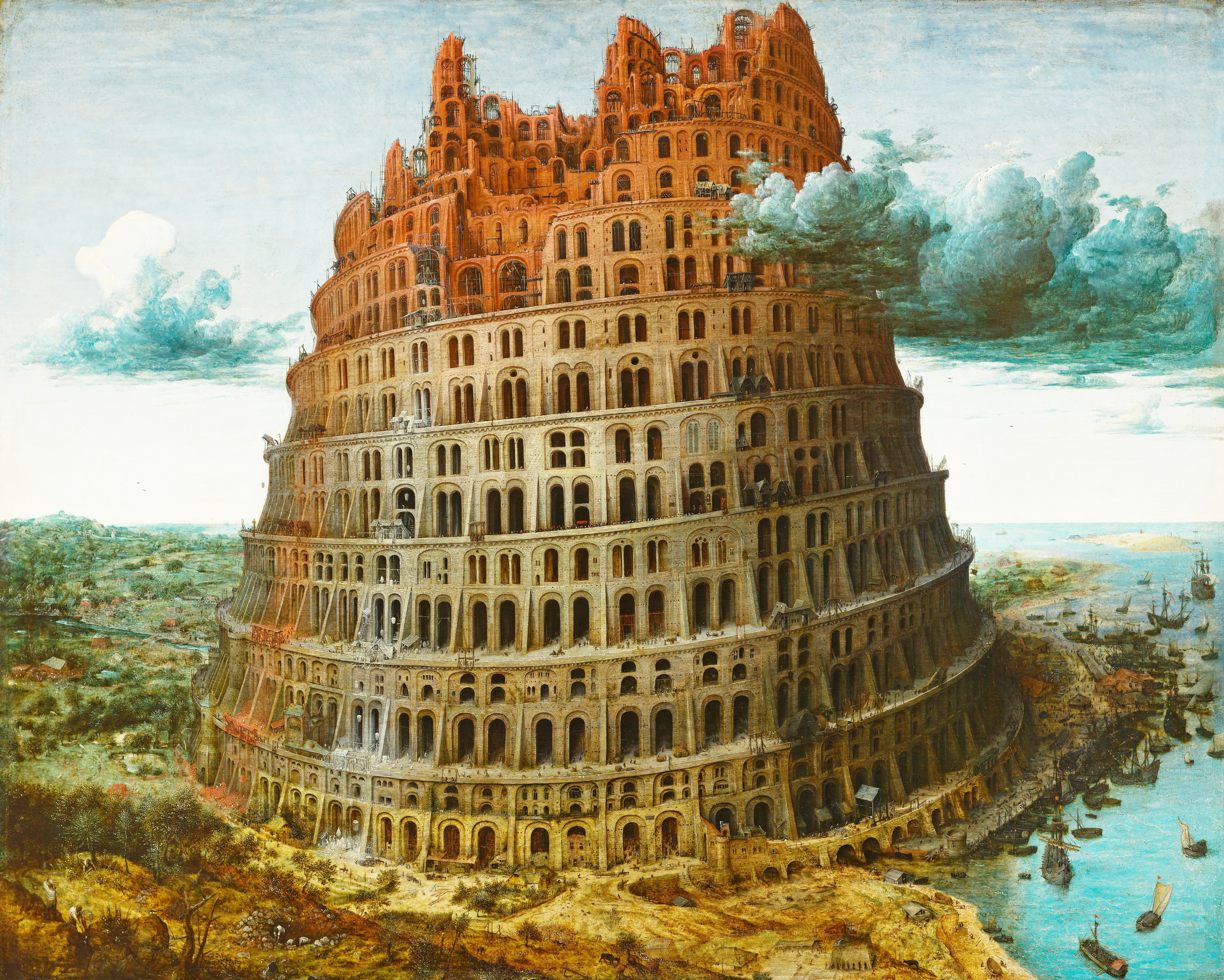
The "Little" Tower of Babel, c. 1563, by Pieter Bruegel the Elder

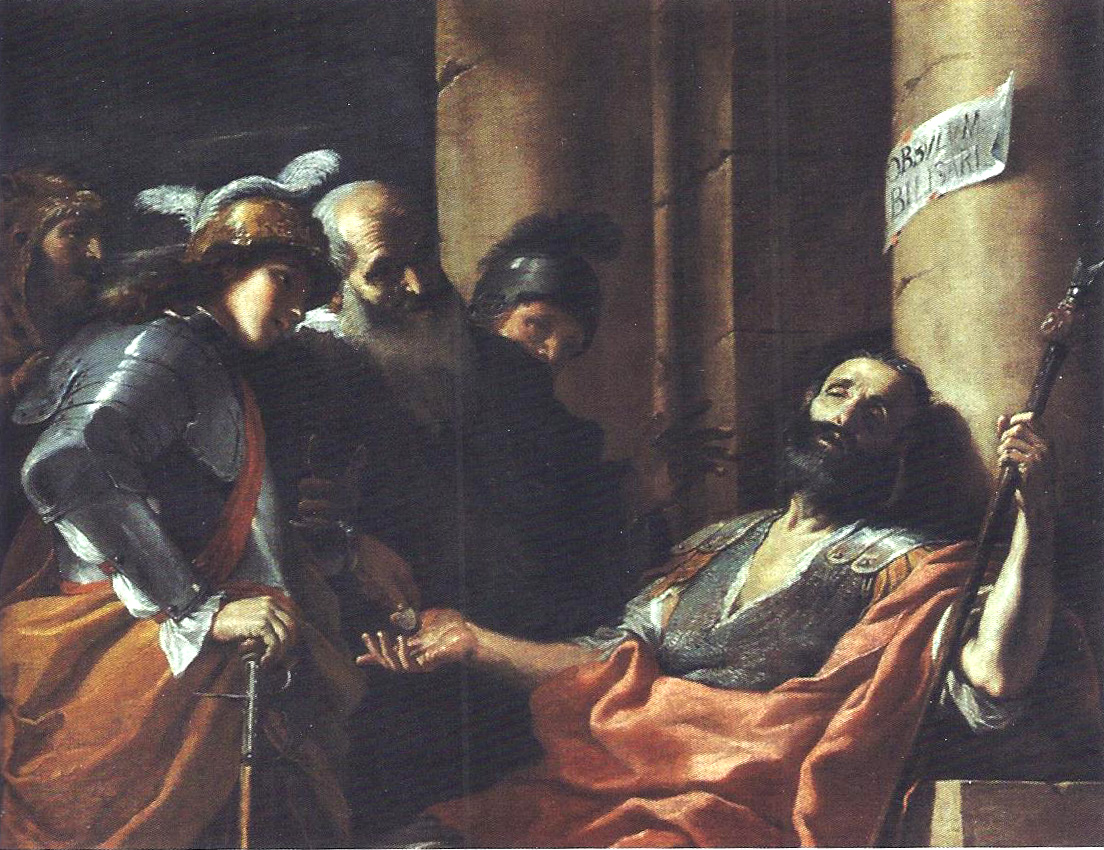
Mattia Preti, c. 1669, Belisarius receiving alms, oil on canvas, 152 x 198 cm

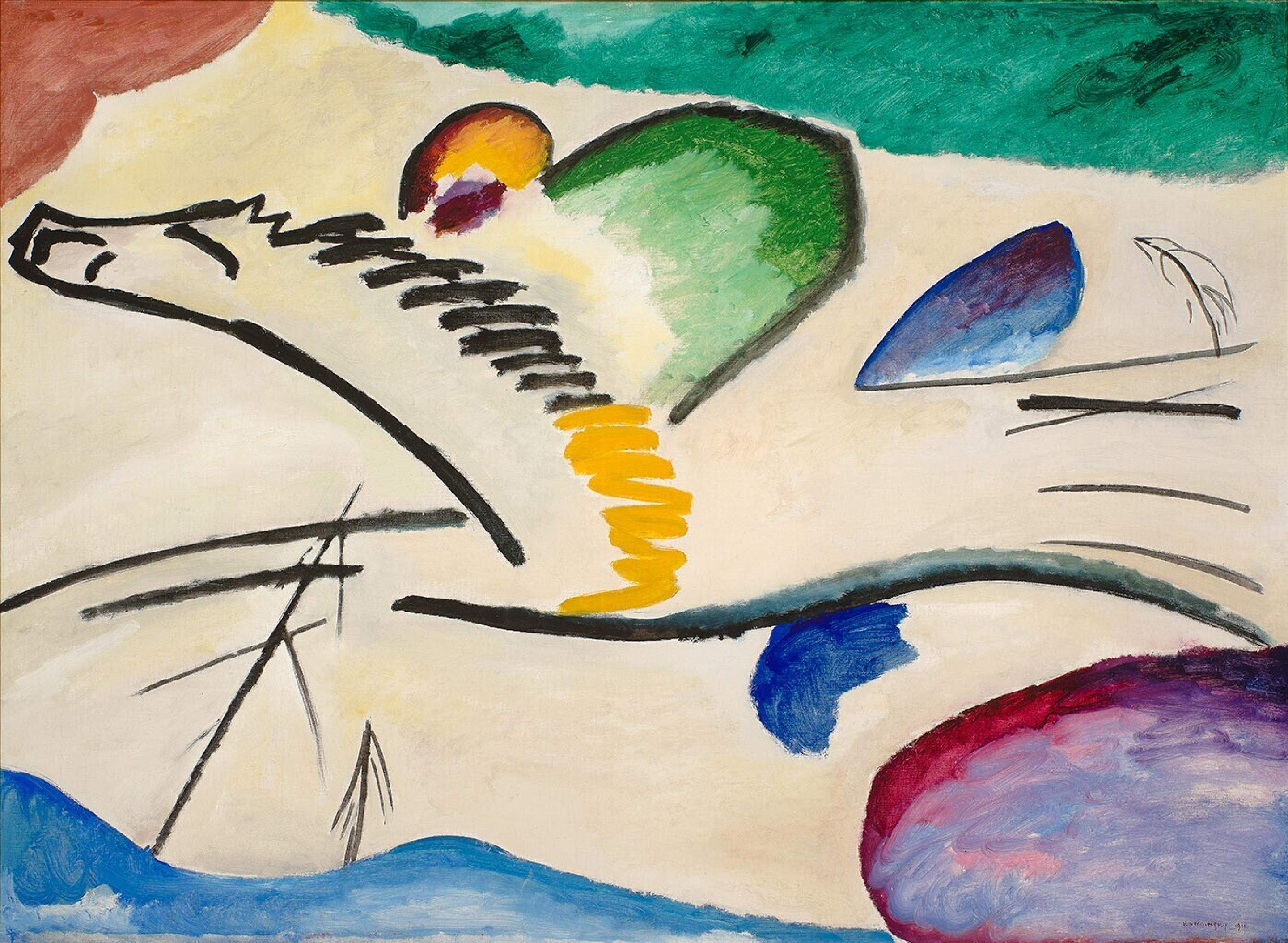
Wassily Kandinsky, 1911, Reiter (Lyrishes), oil on canvas, 94 x 130 cm

The museum has a diverse collection ranging from medieval to contemporary art, with a particular strength in Dutch art. Much of the collection came to the museum through the two private collections mentioned above, but many others have contributed throughout the years. The museum also holds many great house hold objects that illuminate the history of design over eight centuries. This collection of domestic objects rangers from medieval pitchers and drinking ware, to glass from the Golden Age to the furniture and other objects by prominent modern and contemporary designers.

Among the best-known artists that are exhibited permanently in the museum are Hieronymus Bosch, Pieter Bruegel the Elder, Rembrandt, Claude Monet, Wassily Kandinsky, Vincent van Gogh, Maurizio Cattelan, Paul Cézanne, René Magritte, Salvador Dalí, Mark Rothko, Edvard Munch, Willem de Kooning, and Yayoi Kusama.

The collection also includes a rich assembly of works on paper (etchings, drawings, lithographs, etc.), from the Middle Ages to the present times.

=== Selected works ===
- The Glorification of the Virgin (c. 1490–95) by Geertgen tot Sint Jans
- The Wayfarer (c. 1500) by Hieronymus Bosch
- Nest of Owls (c. 1510) by Hieronymus Bosch
- The "Little" Tower of Babel (c. 1563) by Pieter Bruegel the Elder
- Titus at his Desk (1655) by Rembrandt
- Belisarius receiving alms (1669) by Mattia Preti
- Hut of the Douaniers with Varengeville (1882) Claude Monet
- Portrait of Armand Roulin (1888) by Vincent van Gogh
- On the Threshold of Liberty (1929) by René Magritte
- Not to be Reproduced (1937) René Magritte
- Impressions of Africa (1938) Salvador Dalí
- Shirley Temple, The Youngest, Most Sacred Monster of the Cinema in Her Time (1939) Salvador Dalí
- The Face of War (1940) Salvador Dalí

The Wrath of Achilles, (c. 1630- 1635) by Peter Paul Rubens, is a tapestry from a series related to the Greek warrior Achilles . The tapestries flourished hugely from the Gothic period and remained until today. These tapestries are the mirror image of the sketch but these are weaving techniques in which the design are carried out back to front. The tapestries were hung in the walls of prestigious reception rooms during these periods.

The Tulipcabinet, (c. 1635–1650) by Herman Doomer, is the cabinets built or used during Renaissance period where the use of decorative motifs were famous. The tulip motif in this cabinet indicates the symbol of wealth and the tulip bulb carries the symbol of enormous sums of money in the 17th century. This also indicates that this type of cabinets were used by noble rich peoples.

The Display rummer with panorama of the city and harbour of Hamburg,(in 1704–1709) by Johann Simon Rothaer, is a goblet or monumental wineglass which is engraved with cityscape of Hamburg using copper wheel engraving representing the 18th century and pre-industrial design. There are figures on the foot which represents the four seasons. These types of goblets were often used on the buffet during spectacular banquets.

The Mountainous evening landscape, (c.1665) by Adam Pijanacker, is the two dimensional painting which were widely used as a decorative effect for wall coverings and was fashionable thing to fill the walls with landscape paintings in Netherlands around 17th centuries.

The Mondial chair, (c. 1957–1958) by Wim Rietveld, is the design manufactured during industrial which been created with sheet metal structure and fibre-glass seat reinforced with plastic. It was designed in the collaboration between Gerrit Rietveld and his son Wim. The chair gives remarkable simplicity with its special K profile of the back, the seat, the legs.

The Cupboard 'Carlton', (c. 1981) by Ettore Sottsass, is unique to the design practiced during 80s by Italian designers' group. This design was considered or called as anti-design as the designer had used liberal color with low cultural aspects. "Laminated prints of imitation marble and wood are used to decorate the surfaces of the furniture. One of the most used patterns is one taken from a blown-up image of bacteria. Sottsass once testified to having taken inspiration from tiles from subway bathrooms." Even though the materials used in this furniture were industrial, they were produced in limited series as this design was the protest of designers against the mass consumptions and corporate design style. This development made everyone to think the purpose and meaning of each objects in their surroundings in transition of modernism art deco designs.

Along with this type of design collections, Museum Boijmans Van Beuningen holds many objects from 1500 to the present day displaying a specific theme in the history of design. For example, the collections of Oriental porcelain in the seventeenth and eighteenth centuries in the building. "The museum used seven rooms to exhibit some thirty themes from the history of design, illustrated by objects from the Middle Ages until now: from a 17th century tulip chest to an Eames chair, from ceramics from the middle ages to china by Hella Jongerius." These designs display us how almost everything was handmade which showed the craftsmanship before industrial period or before different technologies were invented. The collections in the museum shows the evolution of designs over the centuries to present day designs.

== Controversy ==
=== Nazi looted art ===
Dirk Hannema, the director of the Boijmans from 1921 to 1945, acquired for the museum artworks that had been looted from Jewish collectors who were deported and murdered in the Holocaust during the German occupation of the Netherlands. Some of the looted artworks have been restored to the families of the victims. In 2018 the Boijmans mounted an exhibition around its history during World War II and its possession of Nazi looted art. The issue of artworks in its collection looted from Jews remains contentious and unresolved.

=== 2025 Mark Rothko incident ===
In April 2025, Mark Rothko's Grey, Orange on Maroon, No. 8 (1960) was damaged by a child who made "small scratches" on its surface; the painting sustained superficial but visible damage to the unvarnished paint layer in the lower section of the canvas. At the time of the incident, it was housed in the Depot, a storage facility that is open to the public and located next to the museum's main building.

== Activities ==
The Education Department of the museum organises children's activities, courses, lectures and tours.

=== ARTtube ===
ARTtube was a website with videos about art and design. It ceased production in 2018. It was produced by Museum Boijmans Van Beuningen, M HKA Antwerp, Gemeentemuseum Den Haag, Stedelijk Museum Amsterdam, De Pont, Centraal Museum Utrecht, Museum Jan Cunen and Centrum Beeldende Kunst Rotterdam.

Museum Boijmans Van Beuningen produced, together with TV Rijnmond, a television series on art. It was more than an art magazine; apart from the artists, the museum visitor, the attendant and the employee of technical services appear on the series. Each episode of Boijmans TV was placed on ArtTube - some can now be seen via the WayBack Machine.

== Administration ==
Ina Klassen has been director since 2022. Sjarel Ex was the previous museum director, having the role since 2004.

The museum had 292,711 visitors in 2013. That year it was the most visited museum in Rotterdam and the 14th most visited museum in the Netherlands.

It had an estimated 270,000 visitors in 2015.

== See also ==
- List of largest art museums
- Dirk Hannema
