= Arye L. Hillman =

Israeli economist

- אריה הילמן
- Born: January 13, 1947 (age 79); Bad Wörishofen, Bavaria, Germany

Academic background
- Education: University of Pennsylvania

Academic work
- Discipline: Political economy
- School or tradition: Political economy
- Institutions: Bar Ilan University
- Awards: University Medal, University of Newcastle NSW (1967) Max-Planck-Prize for Humanities Sciences, awarded jointly with Heinrich W. Ursprung (1994) Fellow of Japanese Society for Promotion of Science (2000) Honorary Doctorate, University of Genoa (2016)
- Website: Information at IDEAS / RePEc

Arye L. (Laib or Leo) Hillman (Hebrew: אריה הילמן) is an Israeli economist whose career has been at Bar Ilan University in Israel where he has been William Gittes Chair and Professor of Economics. His main research focus is on political economy, or the study of public policy as the interface between economic and political decisions. From 1994 to 2014 he was an editor of the European Journal of Political Economy for which he remained editorial advisor and editor of various special issues.

He began in 1989 organizing the on-going Silvaplana Workshop in Political Economy with Heinrich Ursprung. The intent was to provide a forum for political economy when political economy was not yet popular. His research interests have intersected with the public-choice school in incorporating political self-interest into public-policy decisions. His book The Political Economy of Protection (1989, reissued 2001 and 2013) described the influence of politics on the conduct of international trade policy including his original contributions to understanding trade protectionism as motivated by distributional concerns. His textbook (3rd edition 2019) Public Finance and Public Policy describes the responsibilities and limitations of government combining traditional public finance and political-economy or public-choice perspectives.

In conjunction with World Bank researchers, he studied the transition of formerly communist countries to market economies, again emphasizing the role of political decisions as a conduit for personal gain. Together with researchers from the Fiscal Affairs Department of the IMF, he studied the impediments to the poor in low-income countries being helped through development assistance provided to governments. He has been interested in 'rent seeking' or the social loss incurred when politically provided benefits are contestable so that time and initiative are diverted from alternative productive activities to seeking the benefits. He studied an economy with Nietzschean characteristics in which the weak have no defense against appropriation by the strong other than to pretend to be lazy and non-productive. He suggested that this described authoritarian low-income countries.

He has been a visiting professor and has taught at UCLA, Princeton, and the Sorbonne, and has regularly been a visitor at universities in Australia. His undergraduate studies were at the University of Newcastle in Australia and graduate studies were at the University of Pennsylvania in the United States.
