= Arie Heijkoop =

Dutch politician (1883–1929)

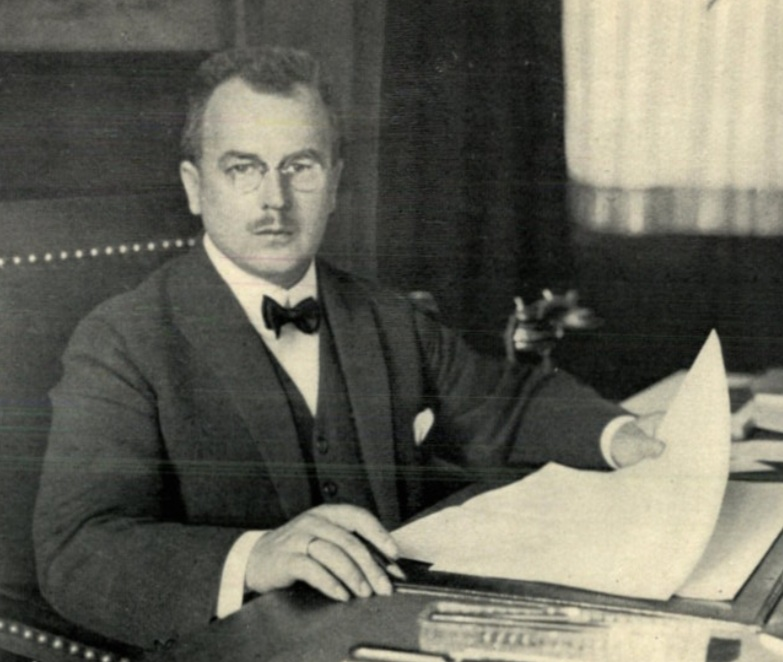
A.W. Heijkoop

Arie Wouter Heijkoop (26 August 1883, in Charlois – 13 December 1929, in Rotterdam) was a Dutch politician who served in the House of Representatives from 1918 to 1919. He was also a municipal councillor in Rotterdam from 1923 to 1929.
