= Arie Van de Moortel =

Belgian musician (1918–1976)

Arie Van de Moortel (17 July 1918 in Laeken – 1 May 1976 in Brussels) was a Belgian viola virtuoso, composer and music teacher.

Van de Moortel studied at the Royal Conservatory of Brussels receiving first prize in viola and chamber music in 1937. He continued his studies on viola with François Broos receiving a further degree in 1939. He then went on to study counterpoint at the Royal Conservatory of Ghent and composition with Prosper Van Eechaute.

He performed in several ensembles including the Trio of the Court of Belgium (Trio van het Belgisch Hof), the London Piano Quartet, the M. Raskin String Trio, a viola-piano duo with his wife Lydie Lequeux, and was violist in the Orchestra of the National Institute for Radio Broadcasting (NIR; Nationaal Instituut voor de Radio-omroep). He taught chamber music at the Royal Conservatory of Ghent (1946–1976) and was director of the Music Academy in Anderlecht (1957–1976).

Van de Moortel won awards for his compositions including the Staf Nees Prize in 1951 for Variations on the Flemish Folk Song "There Was a Little Snow Bird", a composition for carillon, the Società del Quartetto G.B. Viotti composition prize in 1954 for his Trio for Reed Instruments, and the City of Rotterdam Prize (Stad Rotterdam Prijs) in 1957 for his carillon composition Capriccio rondom "Het viel een hemels dauw".

His brother was bassoonist and composer Leo Van de Moortel (1919–1972).

== Selected works ==
Orchestral

- Silly Symphony, Op. 2b (1939)
- Concerto for Orchestra, Op. 6 (1952)
- La Folia for chamber orchestra, Op. 21 (1959)

Concertante

- Nocturne for clarinet (or tenor saxophone, or cello, or viola) and orchestra, Op. 18 (1956); also with piano
- Fantasia sopra la canzone "All voll" for double bass or cello or viola and orchestra, Op. 44 (1970); also with piano
- Rondo-Pastorale (In Memoriam Eugène Ysaÿe) for violin and orchestra, Op. 45 (1970); original with piano

Chamber music

- Partita for bassoon, Op. 1 (1939)
- Sonatina for piano, Op. 2 (1939)
- Trio (Trio voor rietblazers; Trio for Reed Instruments) for oboe, clarinet and bassoon, Op. 3 (1939; revised 1954)
- Sonata for harp, Op. 8
- Danse d'Espagne for harp, Op. 10 (1954)
- Sonata for viola or cello and piano, Op. 14 (1955)
- Nocturne for clarinet (or soprano saxophone, or tenor saxophone, or cello, or viola) and piano, Op. 18 (1956); also orchestrated
- Torensonate for trumpet solo, brass and percussion, Op. 22 (1959)
- Etudes for percussion (1962)
- Etude No. 5 for concert drum and piano (1962)
- Faust et Don Juan for viola and piano, Op. 29 (1965)
- Sonata for flute solo, Op. 37 (1968)
- Improvisation sur un thème de choral (Improvisation on a Choral Theme) for recorder (or flute, or oboe) and piano, Op. 41 (1969)
- Eerste sonatine (Sonatina No. 1) for violin and piano, Op. 43 (1970)
- Fantasia sopra la canzone "All voll" for double bass or cello or viola and piano, Op. 44 (1970); also orchestrated
- Rondo-Pastorale (In Memoriam Eugène Ysaÿe) for violin and piano, Op. 45 (1970); also orchestrated
- Variazioni for violin and piano, Op. 47 (1971)
- Loin des torches de Prague for narrator, viola and piano, Op. 48 (1973)
- Wiegelied van Cro-magnon for double bass and piano, Op. 49 (1974)
- Zonnestraal (Rayon de soleil) for violin and piano, Op. 50 (1974)
- Sonata ostinata for violin and organ, Op. 53 (1974)

Carillon

- Sonatine in ré, Op. 5 (1951)
- Variaties op het vlaams volkslied "Er zat een sneeuwwit vogeltje" (Variations on the Flemish Folk Song "There Was a Little Snow Bird") (1951)
- Capriccio rondom "Het viel een hemels dauw", Op. 20 (1957)
- La Folia, Op. 21 (1959); also orchestrated

Keyboard

- Toccata en Koraalfantasie (Toccata and Choral Fantasy) for piano, Op. 7 (1952)
- Kies een kaart (Prends une carte; Take a Card) for piano, Op. 17 No. 1 (1955)
- L'homme au parapluie for 2 pianos and harmonium, Op. 24 (1961)
- Links en rechts (À gauche et à droite) for piano, Op. 25 (1962)
- Weerbericht (Le temps qu'il fait) for piano, Op. 29 (1966)

Vocal

- Zes puntdichtjes for medium voice and piano or orchestra, Op. 15 (1955)
- Le bouffon de Tintagel for tenor, instrumental ensemble and percussion, Op. 26
- Projet for medium voice and piano or orchestra, Op. 33 No. 1 (1966)
- Sees for medium voice and piano or orchestra, Op. 33 No. 2 (1966)
- Conte pastoral for medium voice and piano or orchestra, Op. 34 (1966)
- Les Cordamont for narrator, medium voice, instrumental ensemble and percussion, Op. 35 (1964)
- Miserere for medium voice and piano (or organ, or string quartet, or orchestra), Op. 35b (1964)
- Imagerie for medium voice and piano, Op. 36 (1967); also for children's chorus and orchestra
- Que Dieu m'accueille avec les oiseaux for soprano or tenor and piano, Op. 51 (1973); words by Armand Bernier

Choral

- Drie Vlaamse volksliederen (3 Flemish Folk Songs) for vocal trio (or children's chorus, or women's chorus) and piano (or orchestra) (1946)
- Oude prent (Vieille estampe) for children's chorus and piano or orchestra, Op. 16 (1956)
- Trèfle à trois feuilles (Klaverendrie) for children's chorus and piano or orchestra, Op. 19 (1957)
- Mazarinade for vocal trio or men's choir a cappella, Op. 23 No. 2 (1960)
- Drej Yiddische Lieder (Drie Joodse volksliederen; Trois chansons populaires juives; Three Jewish Folk Songs) for children's chorus and piano (or orchestra), Op. 28 (1961)
- Vier kinderrijmpjes for children's chorus and orchestra, Op. 31 (1966)
- Imagerie for children's chorus and orchestra, Op. 36 (1967); also for medium voice and piano
