= Frans Jacob Otto Boijmans =

Dutch art collector (1767–1847)

Frans Jacob Otto Boijmans (1 November 1767 – 19 June 1847) was a Dutch art collector. He was born in Maastricht and died in Utrecht.

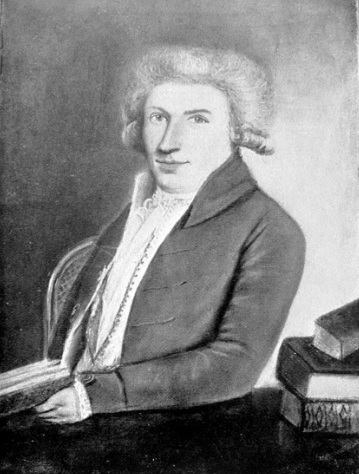
Print of Boijmans after a pastel by Hendricus Antonius Bauer.

After long negotiations with the then-mayor of Rotterdam Bichon van IJsselmonde, which were only concluded eight days before Boijmans' death, he left his collection of paintings to the town. They were initially housed in the Schielandshuis (which had been bought by the town council in 1841), which reopened as the Museum Boijmans on 3 July 1849.
