= Southend-on-Sea =

City and unitary authority in Essex, England

- City, unitary authority area and borough
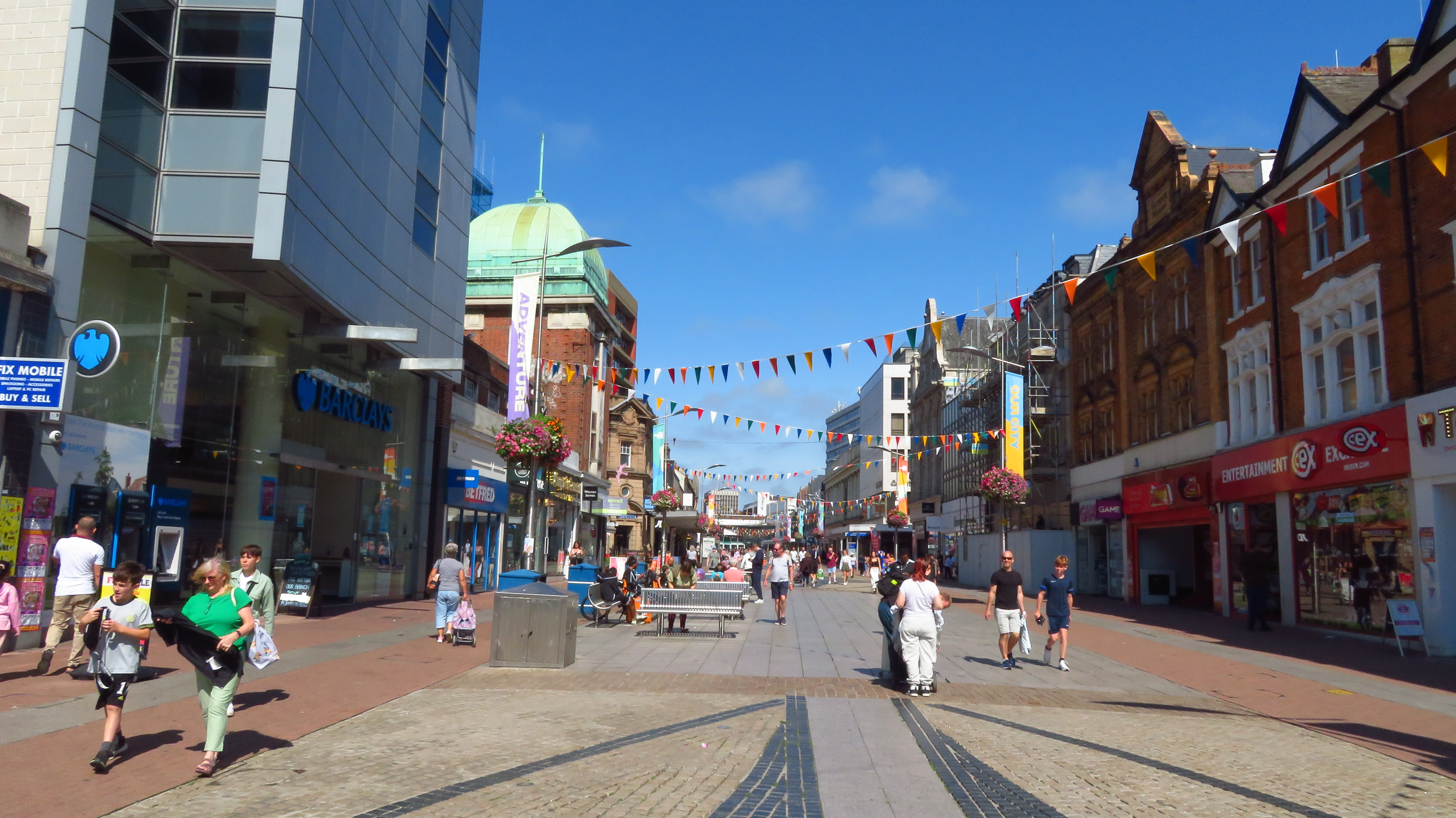
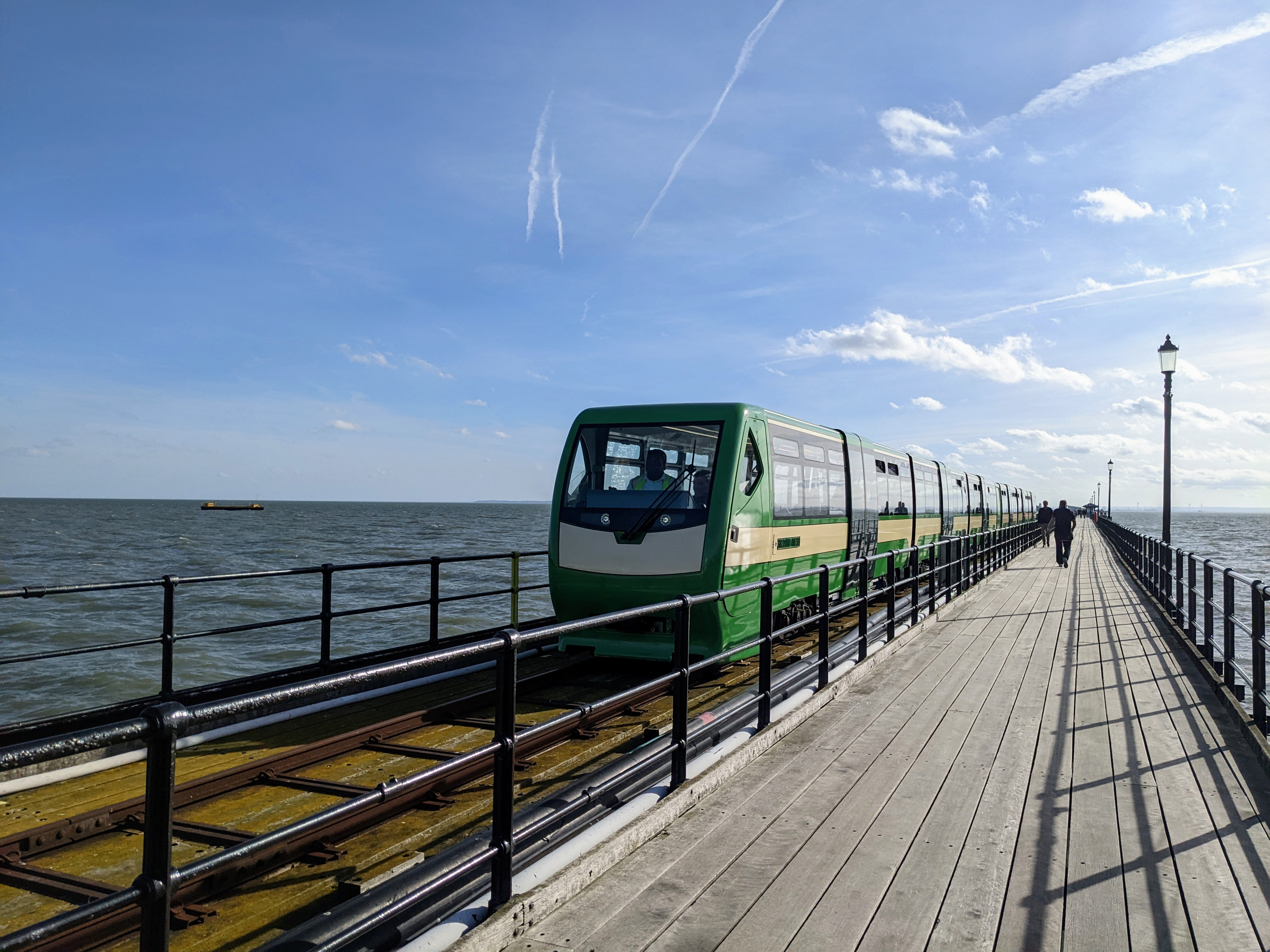
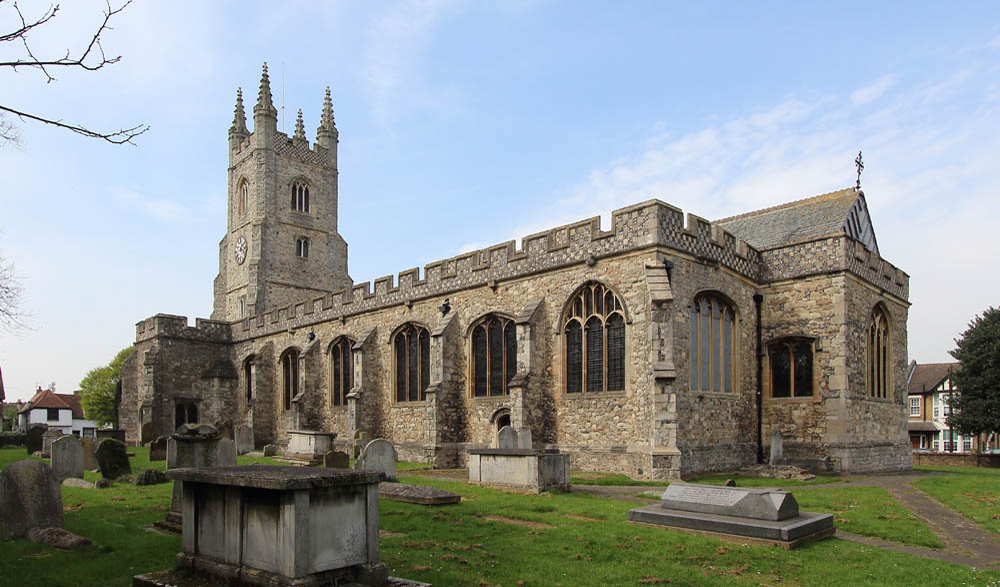
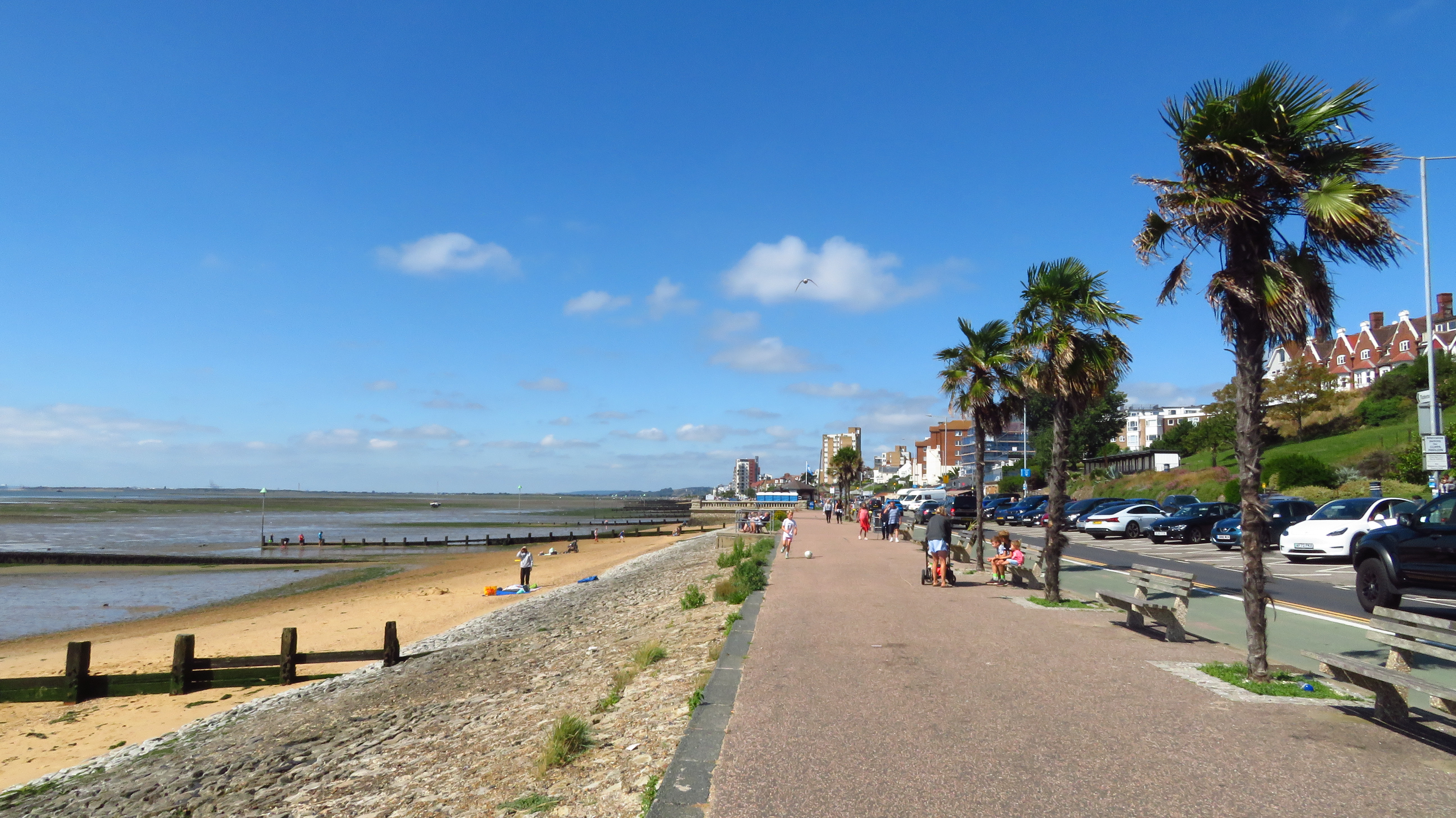
- The High Street Southend Pier St Mary's Church Western Esplanade

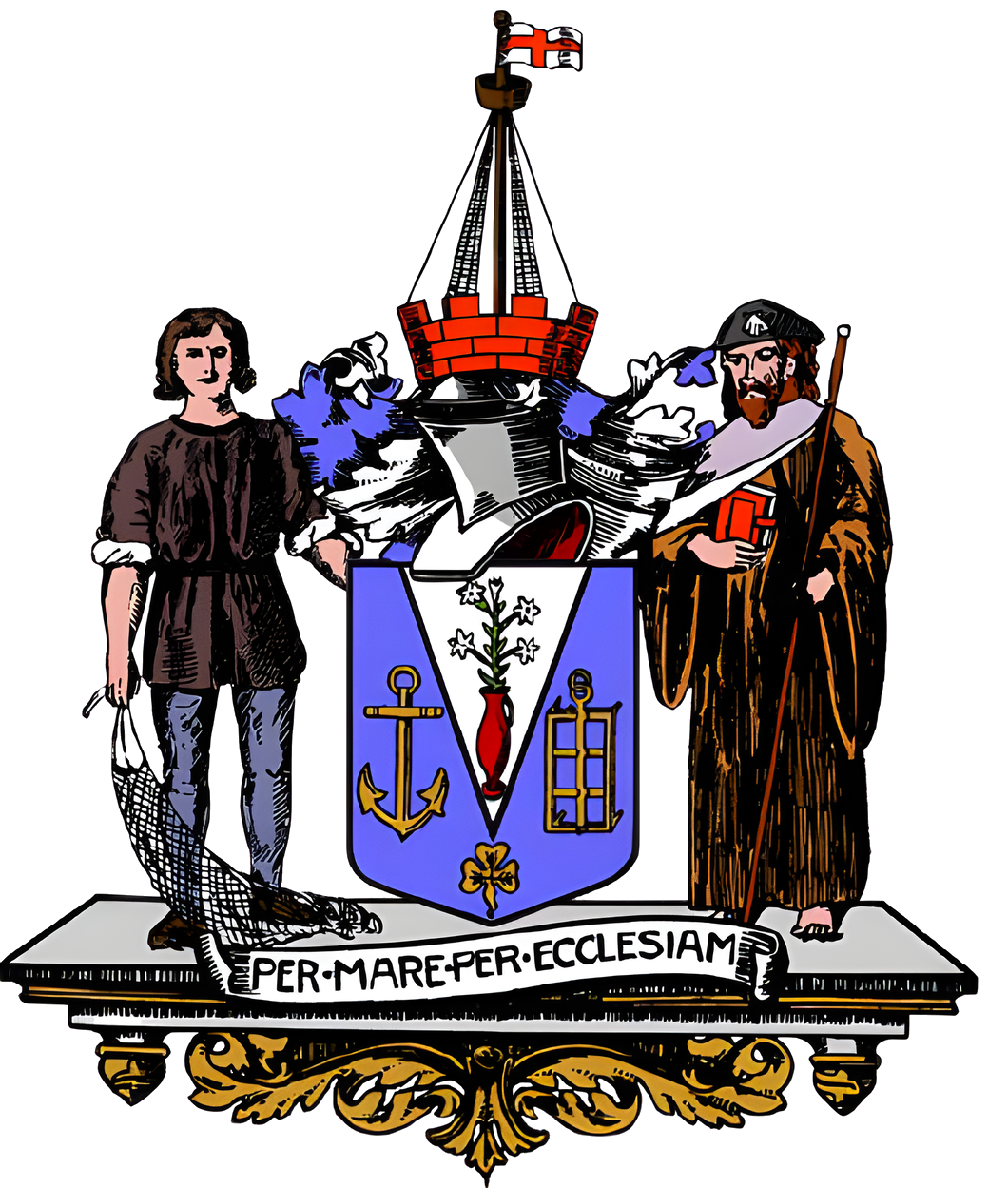
- Southend-on-Sea City Council (Civic arms of Southend-on-Sea)
- Motto: Per Mare Per Ecclesiam (By Sea, By Church)
- Shown within Essex
- Interactive map of Southend-on-Sea
- Coordinates: 51.55°N 0.71°E
- Country: United Kingdom
- Constituent country: England
- Region: East of England
- Ceremonial county: Essex
- Admin HQ: Southend-on-Sea
- Areas of the city: List: Chalkwell; City Centre; Eastwood; Leigh-on-Sea (Town); North Shoebury; Prittle Brook; Prittlewell; Shoeburyness; Southchurch; Thorpe Bay; Westcliff-on-Sea

Government
  - Type: Unitary authority
  - Leadership: Leader & Cabinet (Labour)
  - Governing Body: Southend-on-Sea City Council
  - Executive: No overall control
  - MPs: Bayo Alaba (L), David Burton-Sampson (L)

Area
  - Total: 16.12 sq mi (41.76 km^{2})

Population
  - Total: Ranked by District 117th 185,256
  - Density: 11,510/sq mi (4,445/km^{2})

Ethnicity (2021)
  - Ethnic groups: List: 87.5% White; 5.5% Asian; 3.1% Mixed; 2.9% Black; 1.1% other

Religion (2021)
  - Religion: List: 44.9% no religion; 42.6% Christianity; 9.5% other; 3% Islam
- Time zone: UTC+0 (GMT)
  - Summer (DST): UTC+1 (British Summer Time)
- Postcode: SS0-SS3
- Post town: southend-on-sea
- Dialling code: 01702
- ISO 3166 code: GB-SOS
- Grid reference: TQ883856
- ONS code: 00KF (ONS); E06000033 (GSS)
- Website: southend.gov.uk

Southend-on-Sea (/ˌsaʊθɛndɒnˈsiː/), commonly referred to as Southend (/saʊˈθɛnd/), is a coastal city and unitary authority area in south-eastern Essex, England. It lies on the north side of the Thames Estuary, 40 miles (64 km) east of central London. It is bordered to the north by Rochford and to the west by Castle Point. The city is one of the most densely populated places in the country outside of London. It is home to the longest pleasure pier in the world, Southend Pier, while London Southend Airport is located to the north of the city centre.

Southend-on-Sea originally consisted of a few fishermen's huts and a farm at the southern end of the village of Prittlewell. In the 1790s, the first buildings around what was to become the High Street of Southend were completed. In the 19th century Southend's status as a seaside resort grew after a visit from the Princess of Wales, Caroline of Brunswick, and the construction of both the pier and railway, allowing easier access from London. From the 1960s onwards, the city declined as a holiday destination. After the 1960s, much of the city centre was developed for commerce and retail, and many original structures were lost to redevelopment. As part of its reinvention, Southend became the home of the Access credit card, due to it having one of the UK's first electronic telephone exchanges. An annual seafront airshow, which started in 1986 and featured a flypast by Concorde, used to take place each May until 2012.

Southend was granted city status in January 2022 in memorial to the Conservative Member of Parliament for Southend West, Sir David Amess, who was murdered in October 2021. On 1 March 2022, the letters patent were presented to Southend Borough Council by Charles, Prince of Wales.

== History ==
=== Early history ===
Southend was first recorded in 1309 as Stratende, a small piece of land in the Manor of Milton (now known as Westcliff-on-Sea), within the Parish of Prittlewell. Its next recorded mention was in a will from 1408, where the area south of Prittlewell was called Sowthende. In March 1665, the English naval ship, London blew up while moored just off South-end on its way to fight in the Second Anglo-Dutch War. The hamlet of South-end consisting of a few fishermen's huts and Thames Farm farmhouse stayed this way until the mid-18th century. In 1758 a large house was built, which by 1764 had become the Ship Inn. Oystermen cottages were built in 1767, and a year later the settlement was recorded in the parish records for taxation purposes for the first time. By 1772 records show a salt works and a lime kiln. A visitor to the settlement in 1780 said "not anything in the place worth notice", but a year later the first bathing machine was brought to the hamlet. By 1785, the Chelmsford Chronicle was reporting subscriptions to build a hotel, and plans to make South-end,

equal, if not to rival any of the watering places to which the genteelest company usually resort; there being nothing wanting but such a place of accommodation, where the agreeable distance from the metropolis, and the excellence of the roads, added to the incomparable fineness of the water, have induced so much polite company down these last two summers.

The planned hotel was not built, but the Chronicle reported in 1787 that "Southend is likely to become a place of fashionable resort, and that there are a greater number of genteel families there this season than was ever known before". By the end of the decade, the number of bathing machines had increased and the hamlet was recorded as containing the Ship Inn and 25 houses and cottages; reported visitors included Lord Cholmondley. The coach service from London to Rochford was extended to Southend for the summer season of 1790. The main occupations were in agriculture, fishing, boat repairing and working the barges to London and back.

=== The start and fail of New South-End ===
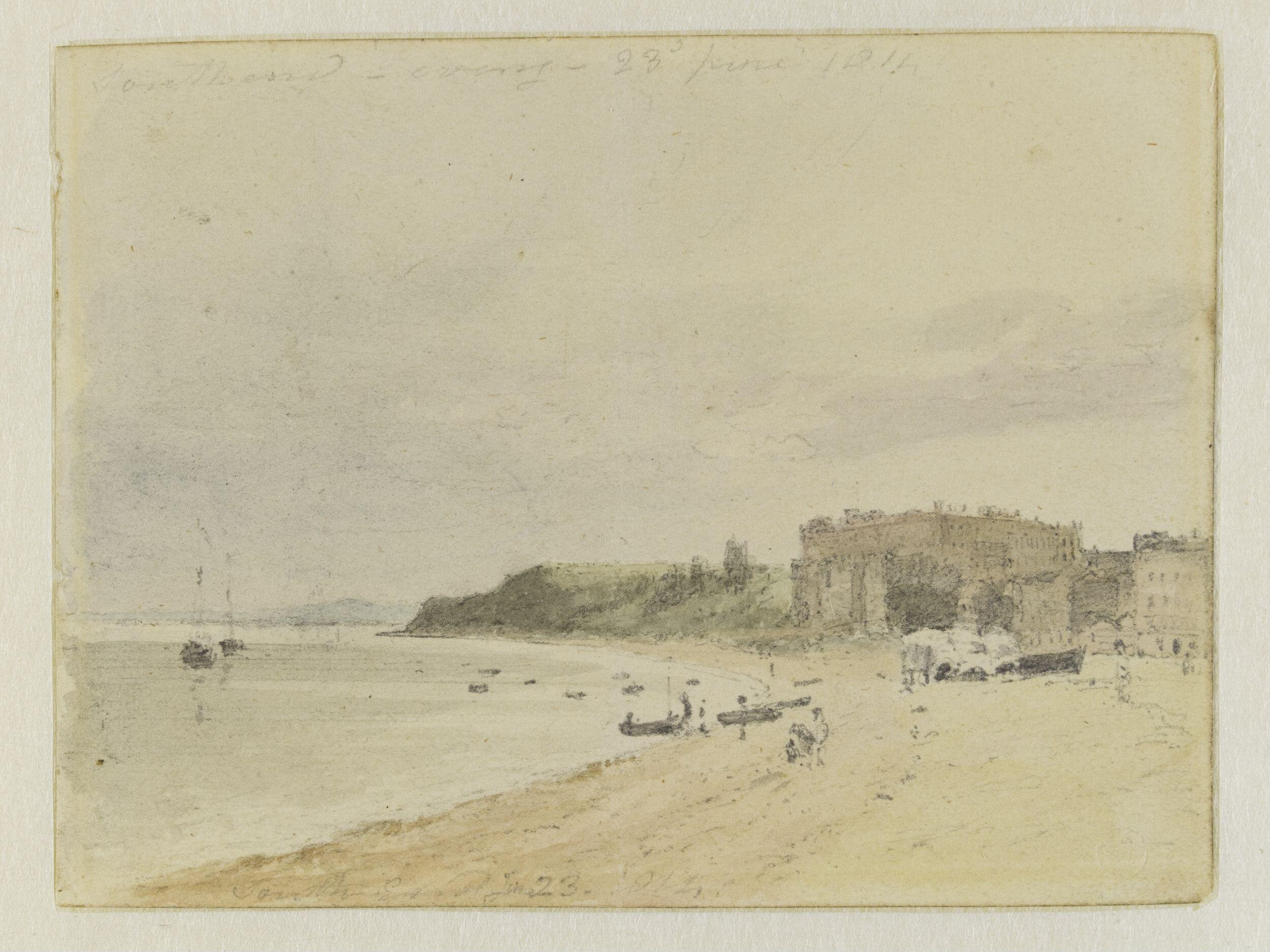
Southend by John Constable

In 1790, the local lord of the Manor of both Prittlewell and Milton (now Westcliff-on-Sea) and landowner Daniel Scratton set aside 35-acres of land at the top of the cliffs to the west of South-end. The development was called New South-End, and the original settlement was renamed Old South-end. A road was cut through the development, which would later become the High Street. The Chelmsford Chronicle wrote at the time,

There seems but little doubt of its becoming a place of fashionable resort, and answering the expectations of the proprietors, being only 42 miles [68 km] from London and two coaches, and the post passes through it three times a week; water carriage is also convenient, being only eight hours sail, with a fair wind, from London.

By January 1792, the first house in Grove Terrace was completed, a hotel had been roofed and 60 dwellings had been started on. By the summer, the Duke of York and the Duke of Clarence public houses had opened. However, by September that year The Times was reporting that the resort was likely to attract the lower and middle classes, not the wealthy clientele that it was being aimed at. One of the initial developers started to sell his interests. By December 1792, the Duke of York was advertised for sale. Development continued with The Grand Hotel, (now known as The Royal Hotel) opened on 1 July 1793, and most of Grove Terrace was available to let. Later that year, New South-End was listed for the first time in the parish annual rate, and by the summer of 1794 the Terrace, Grove Terrace, the Mews and Library had been completed. In February 1795 however, one of the main developers was declared bankrupt and ownership of The Grand Hotel was assigned. A similar fate awaited another developer and much of New-Southend remained open land. In contrast, Old South-end doubled in size during the same period; the Ship Inn and the Anchor and Hope Inn had been built as well as five shops and the Caroline baths. A large house was built by Abraham Vandervord in 1792 in Old South-end which would later become the Minerva public house.

=== Growth of the town ===
Due to the bad transportation links between Southend and London, there was not rapid development during the Georgian Era as there was in Brighton. Margate, although further away from London than Southend, offered cheaper boat and stagecoach fares and had more to offer the visitor. Development was piecemeal in the early 19th century, with a theatre being built in Old South-end by Thomas Trotter in 1804. Southend was, however, mentioned in Jane Austen's novel Emma of 1815. The resort first received royal patronage in 1801 when Princess Charlotte of Wales visited to sea bathe on the order of her physician. Her mother, Princess Caroline of Brunswick stayed at 7-9 The Terrace during 1803 and Lady Hamilton held a ball in the hotel assembly room in honour of Lord Nelson in 1805. The visit of Princess Caroline boosted Southend's popularity with tourists.

Travellers would often arrive by sailing boat or later by Thames steamer, which presented problems as boats could only dock during high tide. The Southend coast consists of mudflats that extend far from the shore, with a high tide depth that seldom exceeds 5.5 metres (18 ft). Large boats were unable to port near to the beach and no boats could approach at low tide. Many potential visitors would travel beyond Southend on to Margate or other resorts with better docking facilities. Due to this, local dignitaries led by the former Lord Mayor of the City of London Sir William Heygate, campaigned in the early 1820s to gain permission from Parliament to build a pier. On 7 May 1829, the House of Lords passed the bill and the Southend Pier Act 1829 (10 Geo. 4. c. xlix) received royal assent on 14 May 1829. By July, Lord Mayor of London, Sir William Thompson laid the foundation stone and the first section of the pier opened a year later. Southend remained a quiet health resort, as the pier did not extend far enough out and visitors had issues disembarking.

In June 1852, after several attempts at building a railway to Southend, royal assent was given to the London, Tilbury and Southend Extension Railway Act 1852 (15 & 16 Vict. c. lxxxiv) authorising the building of the London, Tilbury and Southend Railway. The line reached Southend in 1856. It had been planned to terminate opposite the pier; however, residents in The Royal Terrace opposed this and the station was built further back.

In 1859, the Grove Field area was leased to Sir Morton Peto, and with a consortium which included Thomas Brassey, the contractors for the railway construction, hired architects Banks & Barry to design Clifftown. The first houses were made available for sale in 1871, with even the smaller properties offering a glimpse of the sea. Eventually the development would include the Clifftown Congregational Church, the Nelson Road shopping parade and Prittlewell Square, Southend's first park.

The arrival of the railway did not at first greatly increase visitor numbers, and Southend remained a quiet resort rather than a noisy fashionable seaside town. Benjamin Disraeli visited regularly between 1833 and 1884, Prince Arthur visited in 1868, while the Empress of France, Eugénie and her son, Louis-Napoléon, Prince Imperial also came to the town. A Local Board of Health was created in 1866 to serve Southend's growing population, and the large steam powered Middleton brewery was opened by Henry Luker & Co in 1869. Southend's development as a resort however seemed to stall, until the Bank Holidays Act 1871 made holidays available to more of the population. The growth in visitor numbers saw the local Board purchase the pier in 1873 and construct Marine Parade in 1878, while the cliffs west of the pier were transformed into tree lined walkways during 1886. In 1889, the Great Eastern Railway opened its station at Southend Victoria and a new iron-built replacement for the pier opened.

The town was incorporated as a borough called Southend-on-Sea in 1892; the official name prior to that had just been Southend. During 1892, the famous Southend department store Keddies opened its doors for the first time. Between 1871 and 1901 the town's population grew 100 fold from 2,800 to 29,000. Marine Park & Gardens opened during 1894 and was redeveloped into The Kursaal amusement park in 1901. The Metropole Hotel on Pier Hill also opened in 1901 (later renamed the Palace Hotel), and in the same year the town first received both electric street lighting and trams, and an electric staircase by Jesse W. Reno had been installed on the site of the current Cliff lift.

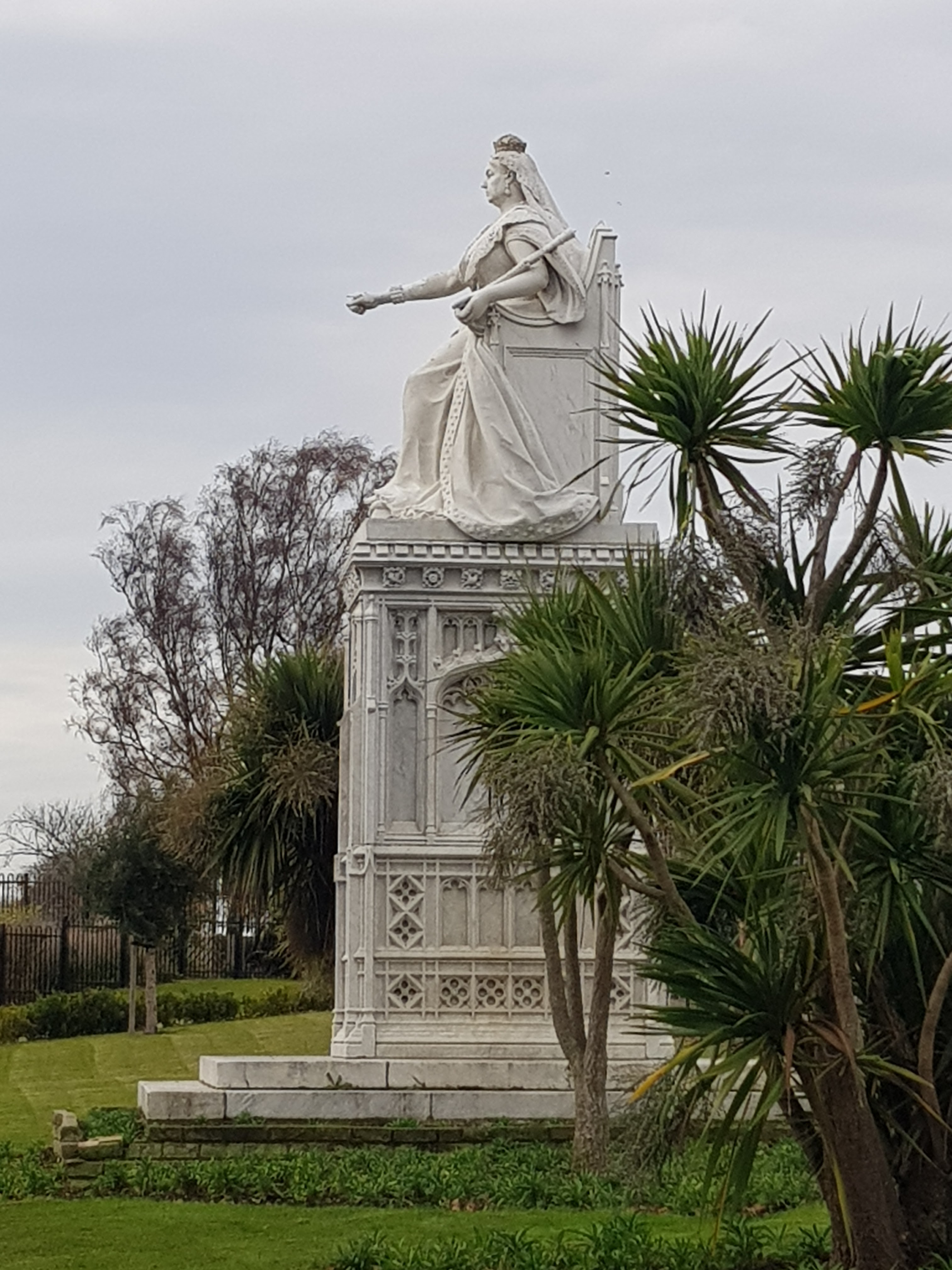
Queen Victoria's statue by Swynnerton, pointing out to sea

To celebrate Queen Victoria's diamond jubilee, a statue of her pointing out to sea was placed at the top of Pier Hill, which the locals amusingly remarked appeared to point towards the gents toilets. The statue was moved to its current position on Clifftown Parade in 1962. In 1903, it was reported that around one million people had paid admission to use the pier, while 250,000 passengers had alighted from pleasure steamboats. Further facilities were built for the growing visitor numbers, including extending the esplanade to Chalkwell in 1903 and adding the wedding cake bandstand at the top of the cliffs, opposite Prittlewell Square in 1909; it was one of six bandstands that stood in Southend. In 1907, following a campaign by the Westcliff Tradesman Association who wanted to rename the town, the Borough of Southend-on-Sea and Westcliff-on-Sea, local businessman and philanthropist, R. A. Jones put forward a plan to rename the town, Thamesmouth.

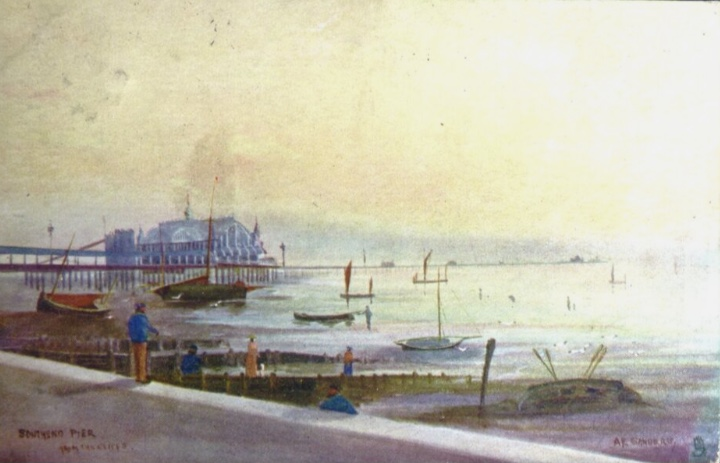
Southend-on-Sea Pier, c.1904

In 1909, an indoor roller-skating rink was opened in Warrior Square. The population of Southend had grown to 62,723 by 1911, the fastest rate of population growth in England and Wales since the previous census in 1901. In 1914, the town gained county borough status, and the Corporation formed the first police force.

=== Southend during World War I ===
Shortly after the declaration of war, the British government began the internment of German citizens and several thousand were held on three ships, the Royal Edward, the Saxonia and the Ivernia which were moored off the pier until May 1915. The War Office selected a piece of land north of the town in 1914 for a new aerodrome, with Squadron no. 37 of the Royal Flying Corps moving in a year later. Many soldiers passed through Southend en route to the Western Front. The pier was frequently used to reach troop ships, with the Admiralty stationing a war signal station at the pierhead, and Southchurch Park was taken over as an army training ground. During the war, the public could still walk the length of the pier. As the war drew on, Southend also became an evacuation point for casualties and several hotels were converted to hospitals, including the Metropole into the Queen Mary Naval Hospital. Arthur Maitland Keddie, from the Keddies department store organised day trips for wounded soldiers from the Queen Mary Naval Hospital to Thundersley and Runwell. The town was first bombed by German Zeppelins on 10 May 1915 with the death of one woman, while a second attack happened on 26 May again with one death. Another bombing raid by Gothas took place in 1917 with a further 33 deaths. When peace was confirmed in 1919, official celebrations were organised by the town. A large Naval review off the Southend shore took place, with a twenty-one gun salute being fired on Peace Day on 23 July. The town organised a carnival, fetes and a firework display.

=== Between the wars ===
Following the war, Southend continued to grow in both residents and visitors, with many moving out of London to live in better conditions. Its population in 1921 was recorded as 106,050 but, as the census was postponed to the summer months due to a planned general strike, it was greatly inflated by holidaymakers. The Corporation purchased three former German U-boat engines to generate power for the tram network, siting them at Leigh, London Road and Thorpe Bay. During 1924, the Sunken Gardens at the side of the pier became Peter Pan Playground, a children's pleasure garden. The pier head was enlarged in 1929 with the Prince George extension, at a cost of £58,000, to manage the increasing number of visitors arriving by paddle steamer. A Southend icon, EKCO, opened their large factory at Priory Crescent on the site of a former cabbage patch in 1930. To cope with the increase demand for housing, the Earls Hall estate was built during 1930, with the Manners Way estate joining it just north along with a new road towards in Rochford in 1937. The London Taxi Drivers Charity for Children completed their first taxi drive to Southend in 1931, with 40 Hackney carriages bringing children to the town, who were given 6d to spend on the seafront. At the 1931 Census the population of Southend was recorded at 110,790, however the town would grow further by absorbing South Shoebury district and parts of Rochford district in 1933. Southend tried their first autumn illuminations during 1935, following the example set in 1913 by Blackpool. The town became a favourite with motorcycle riders during the 1930s, with the phase, Promenade Percy, coming from this pastime. In the same year, the council purchased land on the Cliffs at Westcliff to build a 500-seater theatre and concert venue to be called Shorefield Pavilion with working starting four years later only to be suspended by the start of the war.

=== Southend during World War II ===
Southend became an essential part of the British war machine. In 1939, the Royal Navy had commandeered Southend Pier, renaming it HMS Leigh, with the army building a concrete platform on the Prince George extension to house anti-aircraft guns. The navy also took over the Royal Terrace for its personnel. The pier was used by the navy to help control the River Thames, along with the Thames Estuary boom that was built at Shoebury Garrison during 1939, and organised over 3,000 East Coast convoys by the end of the war. HMS Leigh was attacked by the Germans on 22 November when they dropped magnetic mines and machine gunned the pier, but none of the mines caused any damage and the navy's anti-aircraft guns destroyed one of the German planes. It was the last time there was a concentrated attack on the pier. Southend Airport was requisitioned by the RAF at the outbreak of war, becoming a satellite of Hornchurch and being renamed RAF Rochford. The town was believed to be the most heavily defended place in Essex, ranging from 3 1/2 miles (5.5 kilometres) of anti-tank cubes on the seafront to machine gun and anti-aircraft posts, road blocks and barrage balloons.

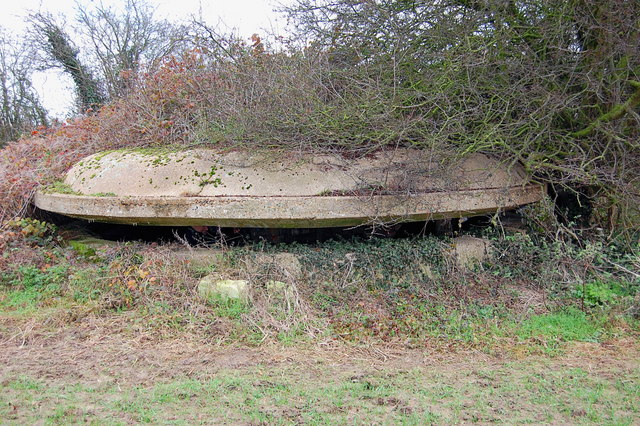
A cantilever pillbox at Southend Airport

On 31 May 1940, six cockle fishing boats: the Endeavour, Letitia, Defender, Reliance, Renown and the Resolute were joined by the Southend lifeboat Greater London at the pier on their way to assist at the Dunkirk evacuation. The town itself was first hit by German bombing in May 1940, when the Nore Yacht club was hit while 10 soldiers were killed near the airport. Southend High School for Boys was hit in a raid in June 1940. By June 1940, much of the town was sealed off, with all bar 10% of the population that were engaged in essential services, evacuated and only military personnel remaining. A cordon of 20 miles (32 km) was set up, with the town being designated part of the coastal defence area, but with the risk of invasion dropping, in 1941 it was reduced to 10 miles (16 km). By 28 October 1940, RAF Rochford had been renamed RAF Southend, no longer being a satellite of Hornchurch, although they still had Fighter Control at the base. A day later 264 Squadron arrived for night fighter duties equipped with the Boulton Paul Defiant. In the same month, a bombing raid damaged houses in the Fleetwood Avenue in Westcliff. During 1941, Prime Minister Winston Churchill visited Shoebury Garrison twice for weapon demonstrations, with the Experimental Establishment carrying out numerous trials of weird and wonderful weapons. An air raid in February 1941 destroyed the London Hotel in the High Street, while the foreshore was often used by German bomber aircraft as a dumping ground for their bomb loads during the war if their primary target was not possible to hit.

In 1942, the area along the seafront from the Pier to Chalkwell was transformed into HMS Westcliff, a huge naval transit and training camp run by Combined Operations. The police helped the Combined Operations Service find the owners of the empty properties so they could requisition properties to billet their staff. HMS Westcliff was officially opened, in secret, by Lord Mountbatten in 1943. The well known jeweller R.A. Jones store was damaged by bombing in October 1942. An amusing moment during the war was Lord Haw-Haw announcing in his radio broadcasts that German forces had sunk the British ships HMS Westcliff and HMS Leigh. The town started to fall under constant V1 and V2 rocket attacks until December 1944, with one hitting the Pavilion on the pier. In 1944, while towing a Mulberry harbour caisson to Goole in Hampshire, it was found to be leaking so it was brought into the Thames Estuary off Thorpe Bay to be checked, but after being left by the tugs, it moved partially into the channel, and without support of the mudflat snapped in half and remains there to this day. Further disaster happened when in August 1944, the liberty ship SS Richard Montgomery, with over 6,000 tonnes of explosive on board, lost its mooring off the Isle of Sheppey, opposite Southend, in strong winds and wedged itself onto the mudflat, breaking its back. Prior to this, HMS Leigh had been the mustering point for 576 ships in June 1944 before they headed for Normandy and D-Day. Force L, the follow up forces that were to follow the initial D-Day invasion force were located at Southend.

=== Decline and regeneration ===
In the last weeks of the war, Southend started to open up to visitors again. The pier was officially given permission to open by the Home Office in March 1945, although the Prince George Extension was still out of bounds to the public. The Chelmsford Chronicle reported that the public returned in their droves, with 79,000 visitors turning up in the first nineteen days, though it wasn't until 30 September that the pier was officially derequisitioned by the Navy. The town, which had been heavily fortified, slowly started to remove the defences during 1945, however the dust and noise disturbed the holidaymakers, with two elderly ladies complaining to the police that it should be stopped while they were on their vacation for the week. Many of the fairground attractions only opened at weekend due to many of the men who worked them still being enlisted. It wasn't until 1946 that the town started to return to normal, and by 1949-50 visitor numbers had rebounded with over 5.75 million visiting the pier alone. Visitors would have used the replaced pier railway, newly installed in 1949, or may have visited the newly opened Golden Hind replica containing waxworks by Louis Tussaud next to the pier. The number of visitors reached a peak of 7 million the following year.

The Kursaal and Pier were nodal attractions used to promote the town to tourists during the 1950s and 60s. On 31 January 1953, Southend seafront was affected by the North Sea flood, with Peter Pan's Playground left underwater, however the town was not affected as badly as other parts of Essex. In June 1953, the town celebrated the Coronation of Elizabeth II by holding an air race at the airport featuring aerobatic displays by supersonic jets, a military tattoo, a coronation ball at the Kursaal featuring Ted Heath and his Music and a grand fireworks display on the seafront. In 1956, the Great Eastern line was electrified which encouraged more Londoners to move to the town, further making it into a dormitory town for the capital. On 14 April 1955, Air Charter inaugurated its first vehicle ferry service between Southend and Calais using a Bristol 170 Mark 32 Super Freighter. It signalled the future for tourism in the town. The British public's preference for foreign vacations heralding the downturn for British seaside towns, though Southend still had strong numbers visiting.

Between 1948 and 1962, it was recorded that 22% of the town's population were working in holiday related industries. The borough council, concerned that Southend was too reliant on tourism and commuting, decided to try and grow commercial industry. This coincided with plans in central government to de-centralise services. Town clerk Archibald Glen wanted to re-imagine Southend as "the garden suburb by the sea". The Miles Report of 1944 had already identified Victoria Avenue as the perfect location for office development. In 1960 the council started work on a new Civic Centre. The Civic Centre would encompass a new police station that opened in 1962, a courthouse in 1966, council offices and chamber in 1967, a new College in 1971 and a Library in 1974. Plans for a fire station were shelved, but one was eventually built in Sutton Road. The new civic centre replaced the cramped facilities in Alexandra Road and Clarence Street. The council in 1960 put forward a redevelopment plan, called Prospect of Southend to central government, to improve both the commercial and retail growth in the town, but the original plan and an amendment, which requested compulsory purchase orders, were both rejected by the Minister for Housing Development and Local Government. Part of the plans included redeveloping the area north of the High Street, which included the Talza and Victoria Arcades, had been discussed with developer Hammerson. Although the plans were rejected by central government, Hammerson started a programme of buying property in the area, and in 1964 the council accepted Hammerson's plans for the site. Hammerson had by this point purchased 93% of the freeholds, and the council used Section 4 of the Town and Country Planning Act 1962 (10 & 11 Eliz. 2. c. 38) to compulsory purchase the remaining properties. The development, which became Victoria Circus Shopping Centre, opened in 1970 and saw a large area of Victorian and Edwardian Southend demolished.

Plans for a ring road around the town centre were first discussed by the council in 1955. The electrification of the London, Tilbury and Southend railway line acted as an impetus as bridges over the line which were on the route of the planned ring road needed replacing. In 1965, the Ministry of Transport gave the council a grant of £869,986 to the planned cost of £1.2 million to build the North and East sections of the ring road. The council used compulsory purchase orders to buy up many of the properties along the planned route and work started in 1966. The first section opened in 1967 and was lit by the first high pressure sodium street lamps in Britain, however the west and south sections of the ring road were never completed. In the same year, work started on dualing Victoria Avenue to Carnarvon Road, while part of the High Street was pedestrianised by 1968. Victoria Avenue saw further development, with offices opening along the section opposite the Civic Centre. Portcullis House in 1966 was the first offices opened by HM Customs and Excise in the town.

In 1969, Southend-on-Sea Borough Police amalgamated with Essex Constabulary to become the Essex and Southend-on-Sea Joint Constabulary. This merger was campaigned against by the council and local MPs. The town's decline as a holiday resort continued, with visitor numbers on the pier falling to a million during 1969–70 and the attraction lost £45,000. Visitors to the town declined by 73% compared with the 1950s, whereas the number of holidays taken abroad grew from 1.5 million in 1951, to 4.2 million by 1971. The pier slowly began to decline and with it the structure began to deteriorate. In 1971, a child's injury prompted a survey, leading to repairs and replacement to much of the pier railway throughout the decade. In response, the council allocated £370,000 over two years, starting in 1972, to ensure the pier remained maintained. In 1973, the Kursaal closed the majority of the amusement park. The pier head burnt down in 1976 and two years later the pier railway was closed due to its poor condition.

In 1971, the town became one of the earliest to receive an electronic telephone exchange, and by 1972 Access, Britain's second credit card, had opened offices in the former EKCO site in Priory Crescent. A year later HM Customs and Excise opened the central offices for the collection of VAT. In 1972, Southend Air Museum opened its doors for the first time at Aviation Way. This was against the backdrop of the government planning to build a new airport on Maplin Sands at Foulness Island. The council purchased a share in the consortium of developers hoping to shape the benefits for the town, but the airport plans were pulled by the new Labour government in 1974. During 1976, plans called Prospects 1976 was released to improve the town's ability to attract holidaymakers, including bastions with facilities at Chalkwell and Westcliff, but they never got off the drawing board.

By 1980, the town's reinvention as a commercial centre had seen it shrug off its tag as a dormitory town for London, however the future of the pier was in doubt. A campaign, supported by Sir John Betjeman, pressured the council to keep the pier open. The pier was saved in 1983 when the council put up £800,000 and the Historic Buildings Fund investing £200,000 in its restoration, but the town lost another attraction that year when Southend Aircraft Museum closed for the final time. Further investment saw a new narrow gauge railway fitted to the pier, which was reopened by Princess Anne on 2 May 1986. A contract was given to Brent Walker to run the pier in 1986, but by September it was damaged by the ship Kings Abbey, destroying the lifeboat station. Two years later, management of the pier reverted to the council. Plans were put forward in the late 1970s and the 1980s for a marina on the seafront, including an artificial island alongside the pier, though the council rejected the plans after the RSPB objected to the loss of intertidal areas for wildlife. Plans were resurrected again in 2020 for a marina off the coast at Shoeburyness. In May 1986, the Southend Airshow was started, featuring a fly past by Concorde; it would become Europe's biggest free airshow. The final show took place in 2012, with the council announcing in January 2013 it could no longer afford to run the show. An attempt to revive the show for September 2015, as the Southend Airshow and Military Festival, failed.

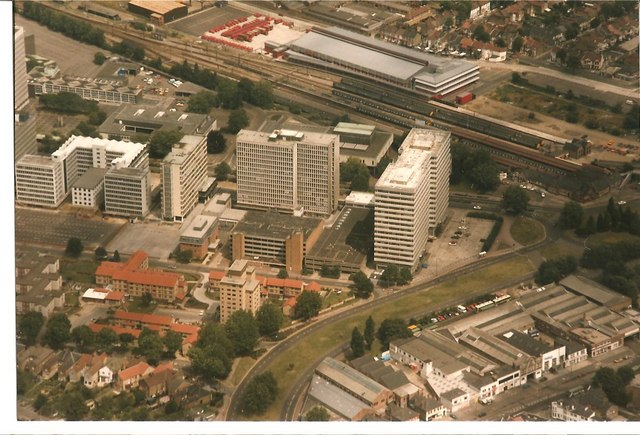
Victoria Avenue, Circus and Queensway pre-1989

The town started to regenerate its visitor attractions, with the Sealife Centre opening in 1993. In 1995, the owners of Peter Pan's Playground purchased the land east of the pier and started to expand, creating Adventure Island; rated best-value amusement park in Britain in 2024. The Kursaal, was purchased by Brent Walker in 1988, who announced plans to redevelop the site as a water theme park, but the company entered liquidation and the site remained empty. The council purchased the Kursaal, and after a multimillion-pound redevelopment by the Rowallan Group, the main Kursaal building was reopened in 1998 with a bowling alley, a casino and other amusements. In 2003, during excavations for a road widening scheme at Priory Crescent, an Anglo-Saxon royal burial site was found dating from the 6th century. The finds have been displayed at Southend Central Museum since 2019. The road widening was cancelled after a campaign known as Camp Bling. In 2002, there was a slippage on the Cliffs, which saw the bandstand close. The cliffs were stabilised in 2013, and the council planned to build a new museum at the location to host the Anglo Saxon discoveries, as well as the Central Museum and Beecroft Art Gallery, but in 2018 it was abandoned due to rising costs. The town's commercial growth during the 60s and 70s has declined and reversed with many tenants departing, such as HM Revenue and Customs in 2022. Former offices have been converted into apartments.

=== The formation of the city ===
On 15 October 2021, the Member of Parliament for Southend West, Sir David Amess, was fatally stabbed during a constituency meeting in Leigh-on-Sea. On 18 October 2021, Prime Minister Boris Johnson announced that Elizabeth II had agreed to grant Southend-on-Sea city status as a memorial to Amess, who had long campaigned for this status to be granted. Preparations, led by Amess, for Southend to bid for city status in 2022 as part of the Queen's Platinum Jubilee were underway at the time of his death. A "City Week" was held throughout the town between 13 and 20 February 2022, beginning with the inaugural "He Built This City" concert named in honour of Amess. The concert was held at the Cliffs Pavilion and included performers such as Digby Fairweather, Lee Mead, and Leanne Jarvis. Other events such as a city ceremony and the Southend LuminoCity Festival of Light were held during the week. Sam Duckworth, who knew Amess personally, performed at some of the events. On 1 March, Southend Borough Council was presented letters patent from the Queen, by Charles, Prince of Wales, officially granting the borough city status. Southend became the second city in the ceremonial county of Essex, after Chelmsford, which was granted city status in 2012.

== Geology ==
The seven kilometres of cliffs from Hadleigh Castle to Southend Pier consist of London Clay overlaid in the Ice age by sand, gravel and river alluvium. The cliffs have been affected by slip planes affected by groundwater, with major slips having occurred in 1956, 1962, 1964 and 1969. A major slippage in November 2002 irreparably damaged the cliff bandstand and restaurant. A £2.8 million cliffs stabilisation programme was completed in 2013. In May 2023, work started to investigate further slippage at Belton Hills in Leigh-on-Sea, with remedy work said to cost £500,000.

The British Geological Survey provided a summary in 1986 of the geology of the country around Southend and Foulness:

=== Geological succession ===
Recent and Pleistocene	Description
Made Ground	Urban refuse, rock debris etc.
Blown sand	Sands with shell debris overlying beach gravels
Alluvium and tidal flat deposits	Soft greyish brown clays and silty sands with subordinate peat. Shell banks north of the River Crouch
River Terrace Deposits: Loam and Sand and Gravel	Yellow-brown sandy silts, locally calcareous in the lower part and sandy gravels with seams of silt and clay
Head	Firm brown sandy clay or loam with clayey gravel intercalations
Brickearth	Yellow-brown clayey silts, locally calcareous in the lower part
Sand and gravel of unknown age	Sand and gravel with variable clay content
Boulder Clay	Unsorted stony clays
Glacial Sand and Gravel	Sand and gravel with seams of silt and clay
Buried Channel Deposits––(not exposed at surface)	Grey laminated clays with subordinate sands, overlying silty sands with gravels

=== Solid Formations ===
Palaeocene and Eocene	Description	Thickness
Bagshot Pebble Bed	Rounded black flint pebbles in a sandy matrix	up to 4
Bagshot Beds	Orange-brown fine-grained sands with subordinate silt and clay beds	up to 23
Claygate Beds	Brown and orange-brown interbedded fine-grained sands, sandy silts, clayey silts and silty clays	17 to 23
London Clay	Grey (unweathered) and brown (weathered) fine-grained sandy clays, and silty clays	125 to 135
Woolwich Beds including Oldhaven Beds	Yellowish orange fine- and medium-grained sands with subordinate grey clays and pebble beds	up to 15
Thanet Beds	Buff fine-grained sands	up to 40

Cretaceous	Description	Thickness
Upper Chalk	White chalk with abundant flint horizons	about 85
Middle Chalk	White chalk with occasional flint horizons	about 70
Lower Chalk	Grey chalk with marls	about 50
Upper Greensand	Calcareous sandstone	4 to 9
Gault	Dark greenish grey calcareous mudstones (with local basal white sand)	34 to 56

== Governance ==
Southend is governed by Southend-on-Sea City Council, which is a unitary authority, performing the functions of both a county and district council. There is one civil parish within the city at Leigh-on-Sea, which has a town council that was established in 1996. The rest of the city is an unparished area. The city is split into seventeen wards, with each ward returning three councillors. The 51 councillors serve four years and one third of the council is elected each year, followed by one year without election. As of the 2024 local elections, a coalition led by Labour run the council.

=== Administrative history ===
Southend's first elected council was a local board, which held its first meeting on 29 August 1866. Prior to that, the town was administered by the vestry for the wider parish of Prittlewell. The local board district was enlarged in 1877 to cover the whole parish of Prittlewell.

The town was made a municipal borough in 1892. In 1897 the borough was enlarged to also include the neighbouring parish of Southchurch, with further enlargement in 1913 by taking over the area formerly controlled by Leigh-on-Sea Urban District Council. In 1914 the enlarged Southend became a county borough making it independent from Essex County Council and a single-tier of local government. The county borough was enlarged in 1933 by the former area of Shoeburyness Urban District and part of Rochford Rural District.

Southend Civic Centre was designed by borough architect, Patrick Burridge, and was opened officially by the Queen Mother on 31 October 1967.

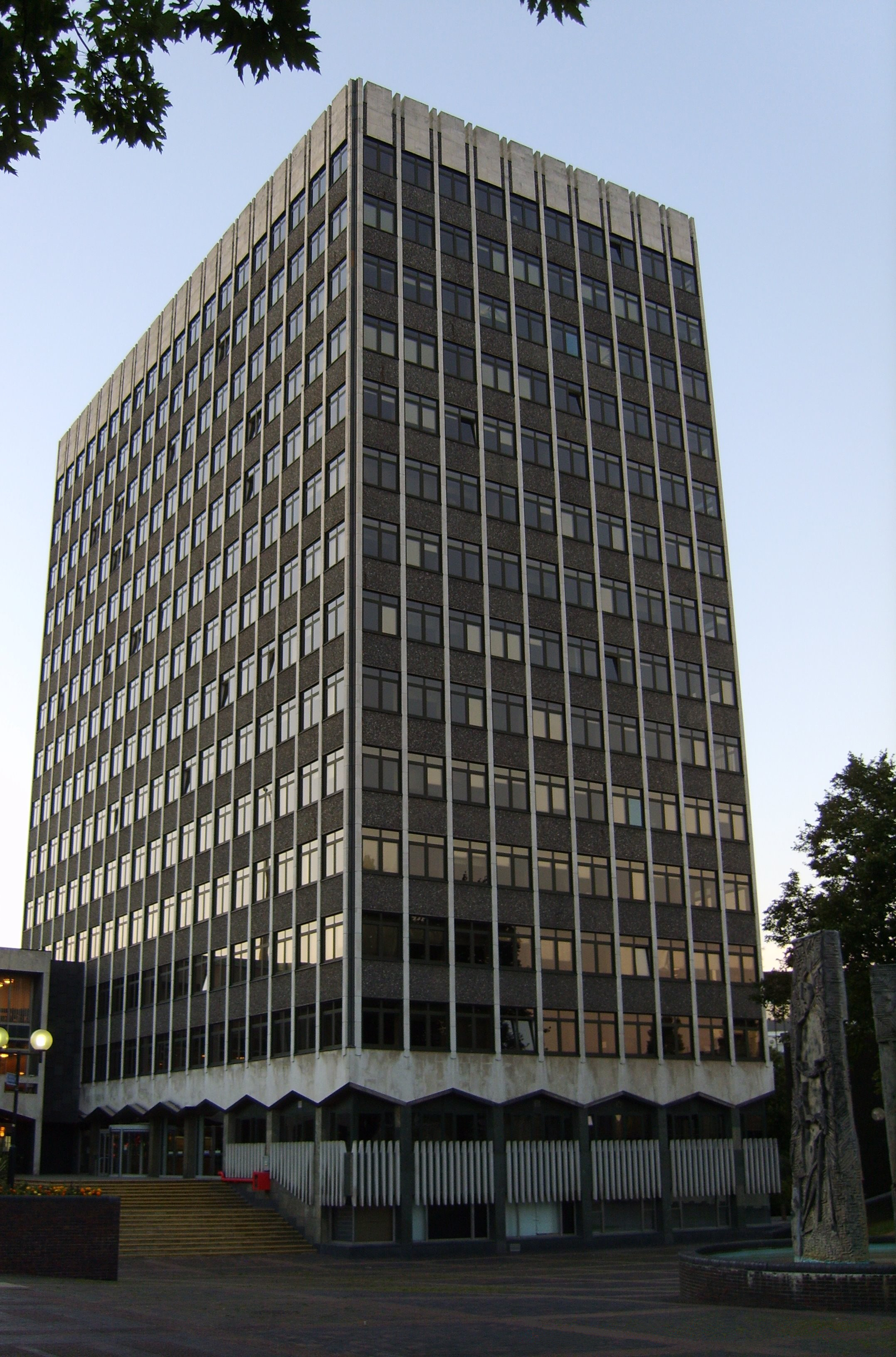
Southend Civic Centre, autumn 2007

On 1 April 1974, under the Local Government Act 1972, Southend became a district of Essex, with the county council once more providing county-level services to the town. In 1990, Southend was the first local authority to outsource its municipal waste collection to a commercial provider. However, in 1998, it became the single tier of local government again when it became a unitary authority.

Upon receiving city status on 1 March 2022, the council voted to rename itself Southend-on-Sea City Council.

In March 2026, the government announced that it would abolish the district in 2028 as part of local government reform across Essex. These proposals were withdrawn in September 2026.

=== Coat of arms and twinning ===
The Latin motto, 'Per Mare Per Ecclesiam', emblazoned on the municipal coat of arms, translates as 'By [the] Sea, By [the] Church', reflecting Southend's position between the church at Prittlewell and the sea as in the Thames estuary.

The city has been twinned with the resort of Sopot in Poland since 1999 and has been developing three-way associations with Lake Worth Beach, Florida.

=== Members of Parliament ===
==== Current MPs ====
At the 2024 general election, Bayo Alaba of the Labour Party won 38.8% of the vote to win the seat of Southend East and Rochford on a 57% turnout. The MP for Southend West and Leigh is David Burton-Sampson of Labour, who won 35.6% of the vote on a turnover of 63%. This was the first time since the initial seat in parliament was created in 1918 that Labour have been elected, as the city had previously been held by the Conservatives.

==== Former MPs ====
From the creation of the first parliamentary seat for Southend in 1918, there has been a history of long serving MPs. Rupert Guinness, of the Guinness family, was Southend's first MP and only stepped down when he was given a peerage. His wife, Gwendolen Guinness replaced him in 1927, until she retired and her son-in-law Henry Channon replaced her in 1935, serving until his death in 1958. Because of the Guinness connection, the seat became known in the media as "Guinness-on-Sea".

In 1950, the seat was split into Southend East and Southend West due to the growth of the town. Sir Stephen McAdden served as the MP for Southend East from 1950 until his death in 1979. His replacement, Sir Teddy Taylor, served Southend East and then its replacement seat, Southend East and Rochford, from 1980 until he retired in 2005. James Duddridge served as Sir Teddy's replacement from 2005, until stepping down at the 2024 election.

Paul Channon, son of Henry replaced his father as the MP for Southend West from 1959 until he stepped down in 1997. He was replaced by Sir David Amess, who served from 1997 until his murder in 2021. Anna Firth of the Conservatives had replaced Amess at the by-election in January 2022 with 86% of the vote but lost her seat at the 2024 election.

== Demography ==
=== Population density ===
Southend is the seventh most densely populated area in the United Kingdom outside of the London Boroughs, with 38.8 people per hectare compared to a national average of 3.77.

==== Greater Urban Area ====
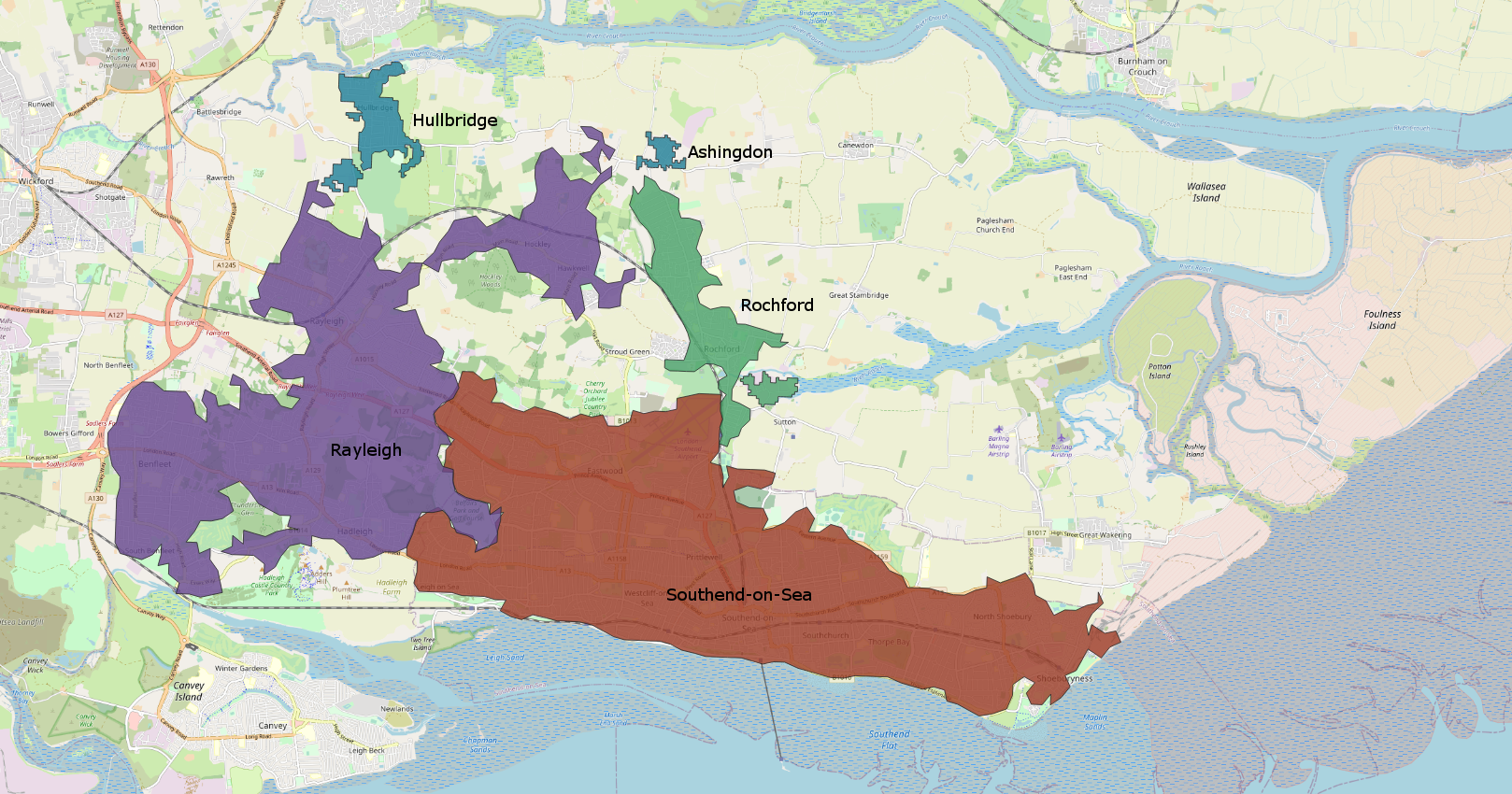
Map of the Southend Urban Area, with subdivisions

The greater urban area of Southend spills outside of the borough boundaries into the neighbouring Castle Point and Rochford districts, including the towns of Hadleigh, Benfleet, Rayleigh and Rochford, as well as the villages of Hockley and Hullbridge. According to the 2011 census, it had a population of 295,310.

=== Deprivation ===
Save the Children's research data shows that for 2008–09, Southend had 4,000 children living in poverty, a rate of 12%, the same as Thurrock, but above the 11% child poverty rate of Essex as a whole.

The Department for Communities and Local Government's 2010 Indices of Multiple Deprivation Deprivation Indices data showed that Southend is one of Essex's most deprived areas. Out of 32,482 Lower Super Output Areas in England, area 014D in the Kursaal ward is 99th, area 015B in Milton ward is 108th, area 010A in Victoria ward is 542nd and area 009D in Southchurch ward is 995th, as well as an additional 5 areas all within the top 10% most deprived areas in England (with the most deprived area having a rank of 1 and the least deprived a rank of 32,482). Victoria and Milton wards have the highest proportion of ethnic minority residents – at the 2011 Census these figures were 24.2% and 26.5% respectively. Southend has the highest percentage of residents receiving housing benefits (19%) and the third highest percentage of residents receiving council tax benefits in Essex.

=== Employment and unemployment ===
As of May 2024, The Office of National Statistics have recorded the following employment, unemployment and economic inactivity in Southend-on-Sea.

Area Recorded	Southend - Current (%)	East of England Rate - Current (%)	Southend - Previous Year (%)				
Area Recorded	Southend - Current (%)	East of England Rate - Current (%)	Southend - Previous Year (%)	Employment rate (16-64 year olds)	75.6 (December 2023)	78.3	75.7
Unemployment rate (16 years +)	5.2 (December 2023)	3.6	2.9				
Claimant Count (16-64 year olds)	4.5 (March 2024)	Not provided	4.3				
Economic inactivity (16-64 year olds)	21 (December 2023)	19.4	23				

In the 2021 census, it was reported that 69.1% of the working population work in full-time employment, with 10.9% working more than 48 hours a week.

=== Population statistics ===
As of the 2021 census, the population was recorded as 180,686, with 51.3% of the population being female, and 48.7% recorded as male. It was reported that 87.5% of the population were born in the UK, while for those who were born outside of the country, most were born in Europe, and most had lived in the UK for more than 10 years. The census reported that nearly 33,000 of the population were retired.

A fifth of the working population commutes to London daily. Wages for jobs based in Southend were the second lowest among UK cities in 2015. It also has the fourth-highest proportion of people aged over 65. This creates considerable pressure on the housing market. It is the 11th most expensive place to live in Britain.

== Economy ==
=== Current industry ===
Tourism is still a key industry in Southend, with over 7,500 employed people in the sector in 2019, which represented 15.9% of jobs in the city. It was reported that 253,900 people had stayed that year, generating £53.4 million, while over 7.3 million day visitors had contributed over £308 million to the economy. Rossi's Ice cream is a famous Southend institution, having existed since 1932.

Aerospace is another key industry. Southend is one of EasyJet's 10 bases in the UK. Southend has several aircraft maintenance firms including Inflite MRO Services. Ipeco, a former London Stock Exchange listed international aircraft seat and airframe manufacturer, has been based in Southend since 1960.

Other manufacturing companies based in Southend include MK Electric, who relocated there in 1961 and in 2014 had seen the 100 millionth socket made at the factory, and Olympus UK & Ireland (formerly Keymed), who specialise in medical equipment and have been in Southend since 1969.

Another major employment area in Southend is financial services, with NatWest's credit card operations located in Thanet Grange. In 2006, travel insurance company InsureandGo relocated its offices from Braintree to Maitland House in Southend-on-Sea. Ventrica, a customer service outsourcing company is based in the city.

Southend has industrial parks located at Progress Road, Comet and Aviation Way in Eastwood and Stock Road in Sutton. Firms located in Southend include Hi-Tec Sports.

As of 2023, large employers (those employing more than 250 people) made up only 0.4% of companies within the city, while micro employers (9 or less employees) make up 90.8%, which is 1.2% greater than the East of England average.

=== Former notable industry ===
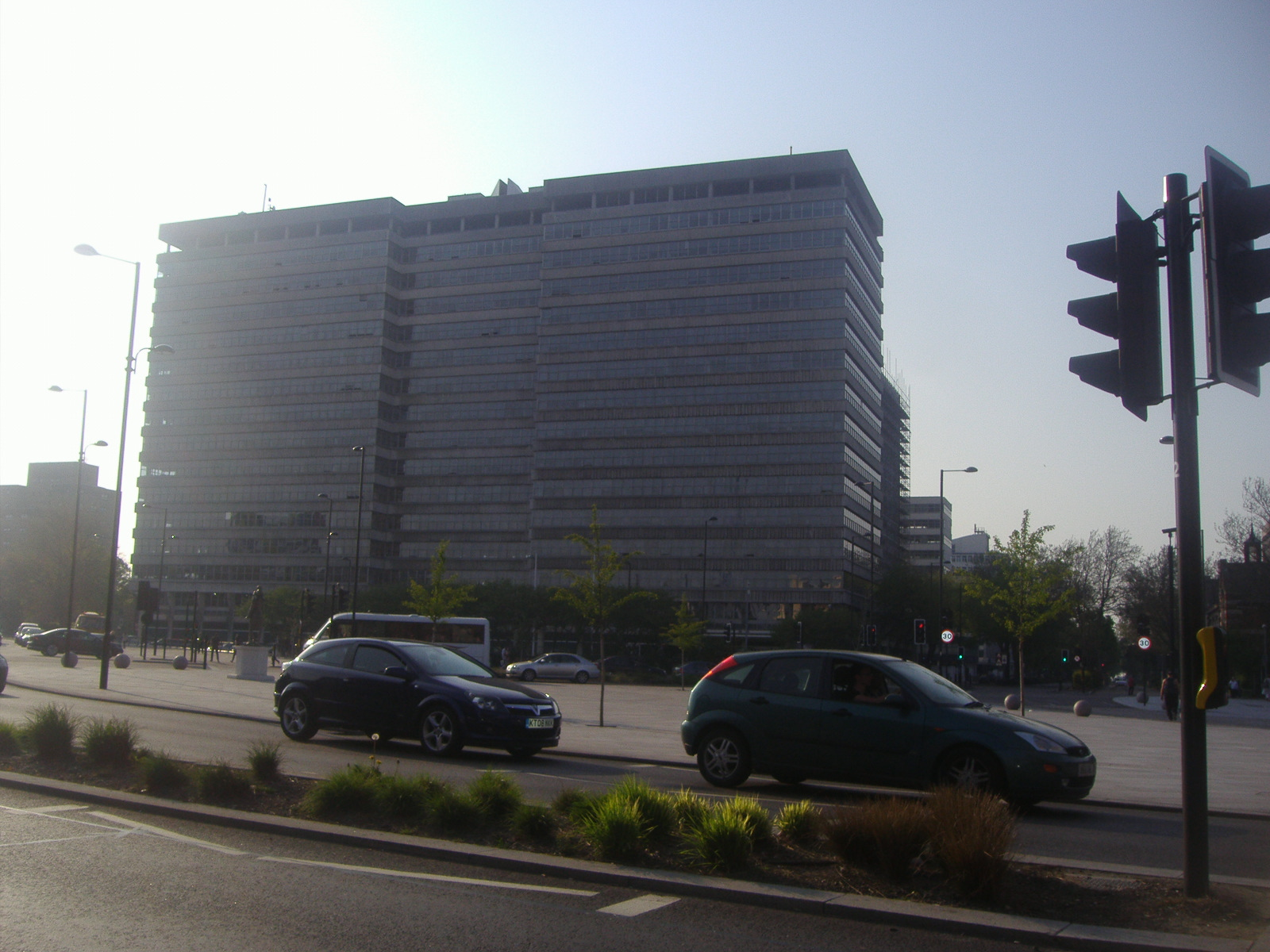
Former HMRC office at Alexandra House

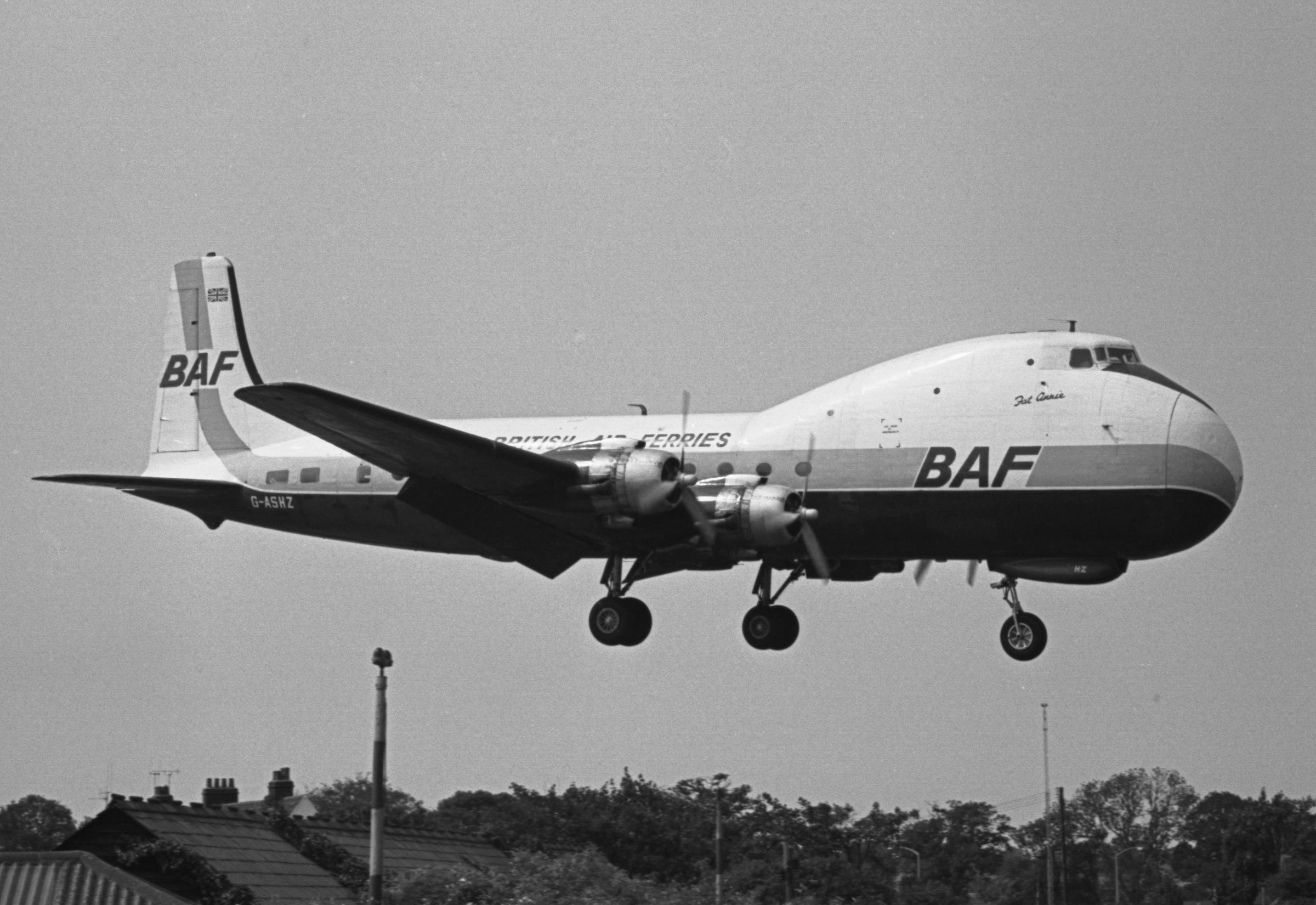
British Air Ferries Carvair at Southend Airport

EKCO was an electronics manufacturer formed by local, Eric Kirkham Cole in 1926. The business started at a factory making radios in Leigh-on-Sea, before opening a larger site at Priory Crescent in 1930. The company expanded into televisions, radar and plastics, and employed over 8,000 people in Essex at its height. In 1960, EKCO merged with Pye but after financial issues, television and radio manufacturing on the site was discontinued in 1966 with the loss of 800 jobs. EKCO Plastics, a separate subsidiary, continued to operate from the site, and had won awards from the Design Council and the Duke of Edinburgh for their products. The factory closed in 2008, with the whole site converted into Ekco Park, a 231 home estate. A statue of Eric Cole was erected on the estate during 2020.

The Joint Credit Card Company was created by Lloyds Bank, Midland Bank and National Westminster Bank; it operated the Access credit card. Established in 1972, it was the second credit card company launched in the UK. The company operated from the former EKCO television and radio factory on Priory Crescent. In 1989, the company was renamed as Signet Ltd, along with a change to allow member banks to process their own customers as part of a Competition and Monopolies Commission review into credit cards. Offices across Southend were transferred to the member banks, including Esplanade House to NatWest, Chartwell House to Midland Bank/HSBC and Essex House to Lloyds Bank. In 1991, the business was sold to First Data Resources, and the Priory Crescent site was sold to Royal Bank of Scotland. The credit card industry in Southend declined with HSBC closing their operations in 2011, and Lloyds Bank closing Essex House in 2013. Royal Bank of Scotland/NatWest, however, stayed and moved to a new purpose built building at Thanet Grange in 2003.

Insurance broker, C.E. Heath moved to the purpose-built Heath House on Victoria Avenue in 1966. In 1996, redundancies saw the number of staff drop from 600 to 300 and, six years later, the company merged with Lambert Fenchurch Group and announced closure of the Southend office. The property remained empty until 2016 when it was converted into flats.

HM Revenue and Customs (HMRC) previously employed over 4,000 people in Southend in Alexandra House and Portcullis House, which sat side-by-side on Victoria Avenue, and Tylers House/Dencora Court, Tylers Avenue. A training centre was located in Carby House, also in Victoria Avenue. In 2008, it was announced that both Tylers House and Portcullis House would be surplus to requirements. Tylers House would close, with the space rented out by HMRC to other government departments. Portcullis House closed in 2008 and, in 2019, the site was purchased by Weston Homes to develop into 217 flats. HMRC announced the closure of its Alexandra House office in 2015. In late 2023 planning permission was being sought to convert the building into 557 flats by Comer Group.

Former companies that operated out of Southend Airport included Flightline, ATC Lasham, an aircraft maintenance company based also in Southampton that collapsed in 2015 with the loss of 144 jobs, British Air Ferries and Jota Aviation.

Essex Furniture plc was a furniture manufacturer and retailer based in Southend that first listed on the Unlisted Securities Market of the London Stock Exchange in 1989. The business operated five stores under the Essex Furniture brand within Essex, and expanded nationally to 28 stores under The Furniture Workshop nameplate. The company closed their Southend factory in 1998, subsequently announced a £3.7 million half year loss, and entered insolvency later that year.

=== Utilities history ===
==== Electricity ====
Southend-on-Sea County Borough Corporation provided the borough with electricity from the early twentieth century up to 1966 from the Southend power station in London Road. Upon nationalisation of the electricity industry in 1948, ownership passed to the British Electricity Authority and later to the Central Electricity Generating Board. Electricity connections to the national grid rendered the 5.75 megawatt (MW) power station redundant. Electricity was generated by diesel engines and by steam obtained from the exhaust gases. The power station closed in 1966 and in its final year of operation it delivered 2,720 MWh of electricity to the borough.

==== Gas ====
In 1853, a new company, the Southend Gas Company, was set up to build a coal gas works to supply the town. The works opened on Eastern Esplanade in 1855 and helped with the development of the then fledgling town. The company was purchased by Southend Corporation after the First World War, with its own landing pier locally known as Southend Pier Junior. The company was nationalised in 1949 and was transferred to the North Thames Gas Board, who in 1960 added the brutalist Esplanade House to the site as offices. The site stopped producing coal gas in 1968, and the works was demolished. Esplanade House, was taken over by Access credit card operations in the 1980s but, by the 1990s, they had moved out and the gas works site remained empty until it was demolished to make way for a Premier Inn in 2014.

==== Water ====
Southend Waterworks Company was formed by Thomas Brassey in 1865, initially to provide water for the steam engines on the new railway line that opened in 1856, with which Brassey was involved. The company constructed the town's first deep borehole in Milton Road, along with a reservoir to hold 300,000 gallons. In 1870, Brassey died, and a limited company was formed to take over the works, becoming a statutory undertaker via the Southend Waterworks Act 1879 (42 & 43 Vict. c. cxx). The company expanded the area it covered outside of the city, and worked with neighbouring water company, South Essex Waterworks Company on projects at Langford and Hanningfield. The Essex Water Order 1970 (SI 1970/786) was passed by Parliament and, on 1 April 1970, the Southend Waterworks Company amalgamated with the South Essex Waterworks Company to become the Essex Water Company. In 1991, Essex Water purchased Suffolk Water to become Essex and Suffolk Water.

=== Retail ===
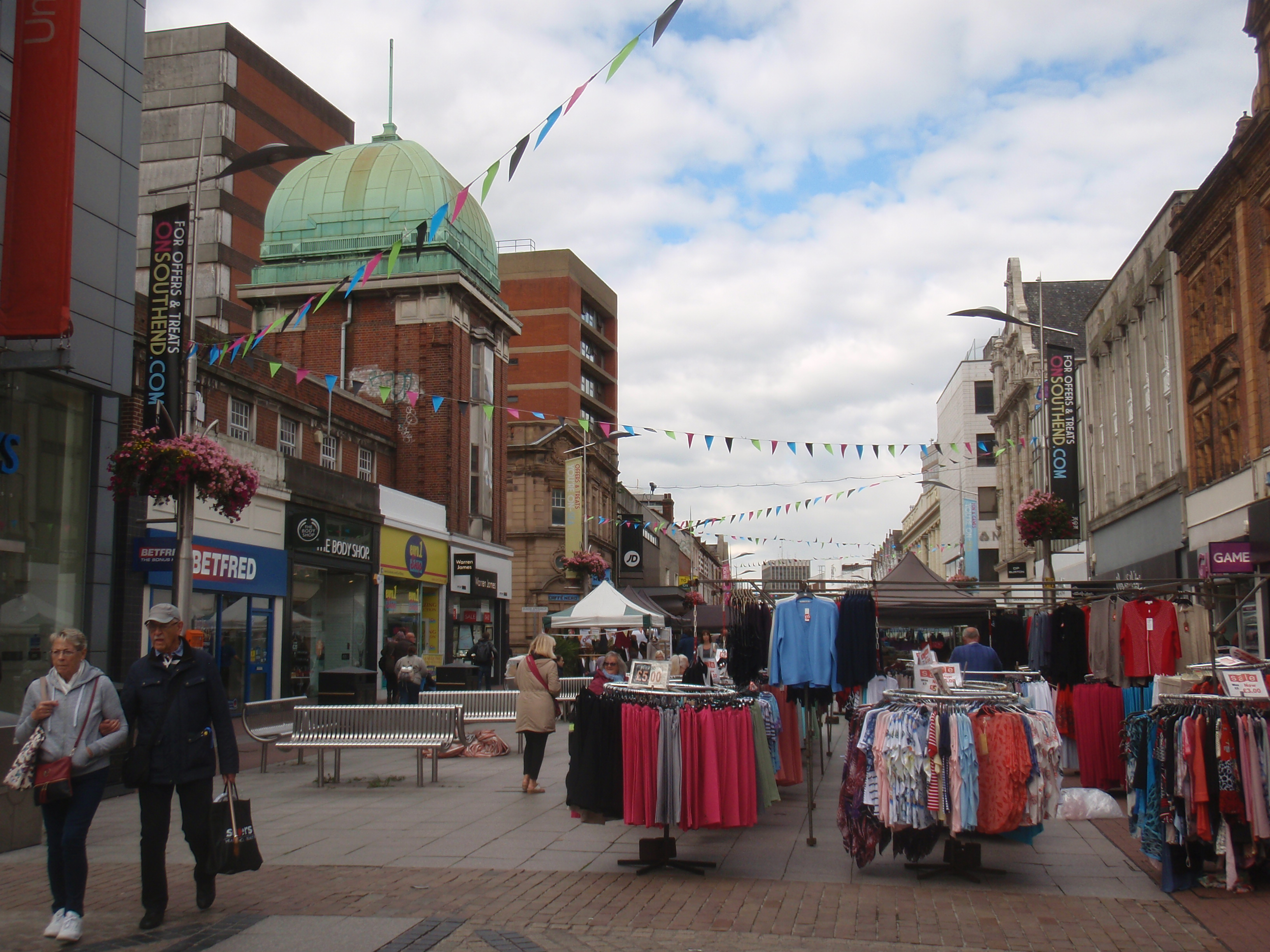
High Street, looking north on market day

Southend High Street runs from the top of Pier Hill to Victoria Circus and has two shopping centres: the Victoria (built during the 1960s to replace the old Talza Arcade, Victoria Arcade and Broadway Market), and The Royals. The latter was designed by the Building Design Partnership, construction starting in 1985, and it was officially opened in March 1988 by singer-actor Jason Donovan. The Royals is on the site of the southern end of High Street and Grove Road and its construction saw the demolition of the Ritz Cinema and Grand Pier Hotel. Prior to the opening, Morrissey filmed the video for his top ten charting track Everyday Is Like Sunday in the centre. Southend High Street mainly consists of chain stores, with Boots located in the Royals, while Next anchor the Victoria. However, since the covid pandemic the amount of empty shops in the city centre has increased greatly, with the High Street being called a ghost town.

Dixons Retail, now renamed Currys plc, started in Southend during 1937 and is still active in 2024.

The Broadway in Leigh-on-Sea is known for its independent boutiques and coffee shops. Leigh Road in Leigh-on-Sea, Southchurch Road and London Road are where many of Southend's independent businesses now reside. Hamlet Court Road, Westcliff-on-Sea was once known as the Bond Street of Essex, and is full of historical buildings, having been designated a conservation area in 2021. The road hosts the In Harmony festival each year.

There are regular vintage fairs and markets in Southend, held at a variety of locations including the Leigh Community Centre and Garon Park. A record fair is frequently held at West Leigh Schools in Leigh-on-Sea.

==== Markets ====
Demolition of the historic Victorian covered York Road market began on 23 April 2010, with the site becoming a car park. A temporary market had been held there every Friday until 2012 after the closure of the former Southend market at the rear of the Odeon. As of 2013, a market started to be held in the High Street every Thursday with over 30 stalls, with a further Saturday market being started in 2023.

=== Former retail businesses ===
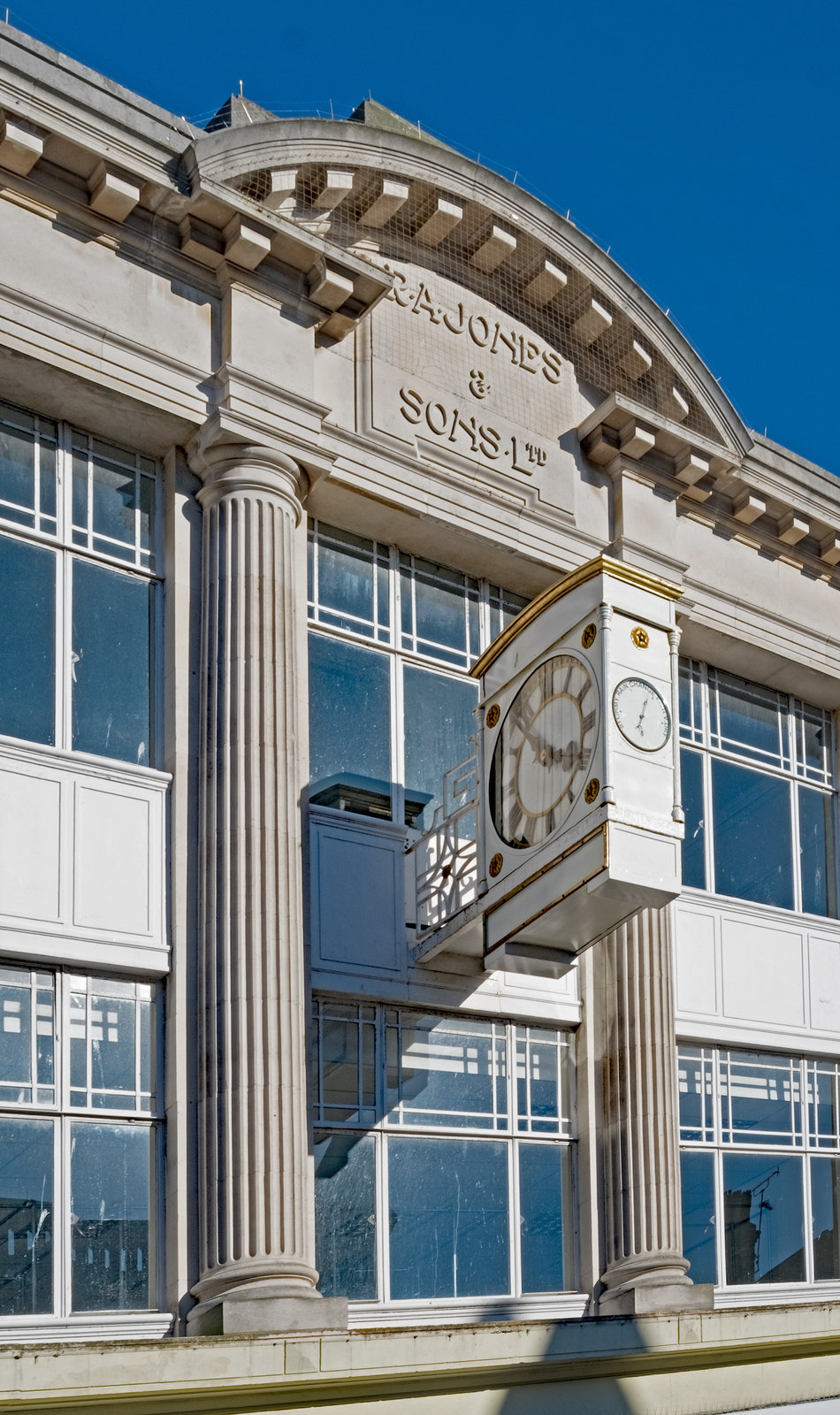
R A Jones building in Southend High Street

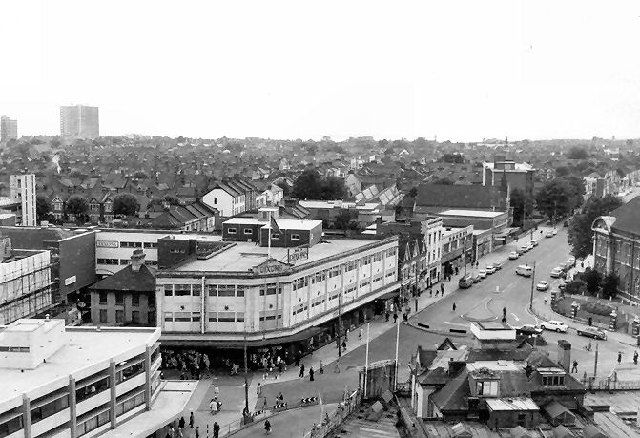
Dixons in 1969

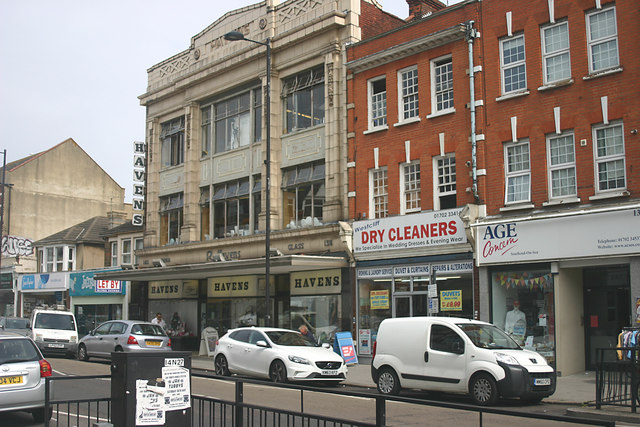
Havens (left) in 2015

Southend was not always full of chain stores, with many historical independent stores closing during the 70s, 80s and 90s:

- Keddies was a nationally recognised department store opened in 1892. The store, located in the High Street, went into administration in 1996.
- J F Dixons opened as a drapers in 1913 on the corner of London Road and what is now the High Street. Expansion before World War II saw it become a department store. The business closed in 1973.
- Brightwells was a department store that opened in 19th century. The store closed in the 1970s.
- Havens was a department store that opened in 1901, in Hamlet Court Road, Westcliff-on-Sea. In May 2017, Havens announced that they would be closing their store to concentrate as an online retailer.
- Garons opened as a grocers at 64 High Street in 1885. The grocers in 1910 opened a cinema and cafe, which had a ballroom added in 1920. The company further expanded the grocery side of the business, opening a large bakery in Sutton Road, and by 1946 branches were operating as grocers, butchers and greengrocers across the town. The company also grew their catering facilities with the construction of Center House at 66-68 High Street. In 1962, the 45 grocery stores across Essex and the bakery was sold to Moores Stores. The cinema was closed a year later, with the premises sold to make way for a development by Hammerson and the remaining business, including the new Garons 1 Banqueting suite at Victoria Circus was sold to G and W Walker in 1972. Garon Park was built on land donated by the family.
- R. A. Jones was a jewellers that was opened by Robert Arthur Jones in 1890. Jones would go on and become a benefactor for the town. The store closed in 1979.
- Owen Wallis purchased an existing ironmongers store located in the High Street in around 1882. The store expanded into selling toys, before closing in the 1980s.
- Bermans was a sports and toy retailer who operated from Southchurch Road. The store closed in the 1980s.
- J Patience was a photographic retailers located in Queens Road.
- Schofield and Martin was a grocery firm with stores across Southend, that was purchased by Waitrose in 1944 with the name being used until the 1960s. The Alexandra Street branch was the first Waitrose store in 1951 to be made self-service.
- Ravens was the longest surviving independent retail business in Southend. The outfitters was started in 1897 by Percy Raven from a small store in the High Street. The business moved to a larger store in the High Street designed by architect Mr Grover, before moving to a newer store on London Road in the 1930s. The store relocated to Clifftown Road in 1952, and operated from the site until its closure in 2017.
- LL Wellfare was a furniture and electrical store based in Sutton Road, which was started in 1946 by Linton Wellfare. The business closed in 2010 after the retirement of Linton's son Richard.
- James Heddle & Son was a credit drapers that operated across Essex. William Heddle was born in Orkney in 1846, moving to Maldon in 1864. He married in 1870, moving to Southend and shortly afterwards opened a drapery store in Park Street. William would go on and join the religious sect, the Peculiar People, in 1873, becoming their Supreme Bishop between 1901 and 1942, before his death in 1948. The business remained in the family until it closed in 1980.

== Transport ==
=== Airport ===
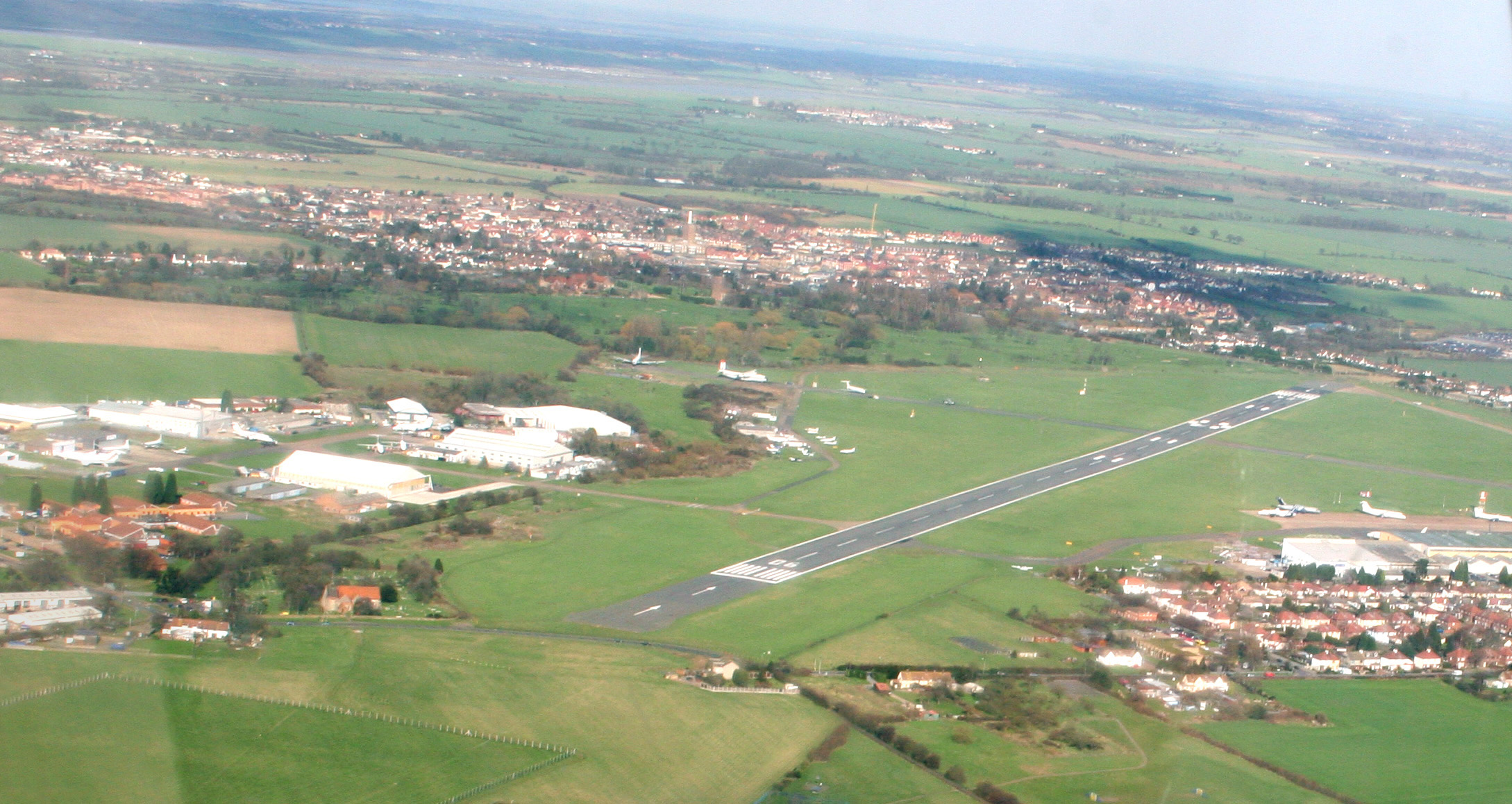
Southend Airport, prior to the runway extension

London Southend Airport was developed from the military airfield at Rochford; it was opened as a civil airport in 1935. The airport was the UK's third-busiest airport during the 1960s, behind Heathrow and Manchester, before passenger numbers dropped off in the 1970s. In 2008, Stobart Group bought the lease for £21 million. A rebuilding of the airport was completed during 2010. It now offers scheduled flights to destinations across Europe, corporate and recreational flights, aircraft maintenance and training for pilots and engineers. It is served by Southend Airport railway station, on the Shenfield–Southend line.

=== Buses ===
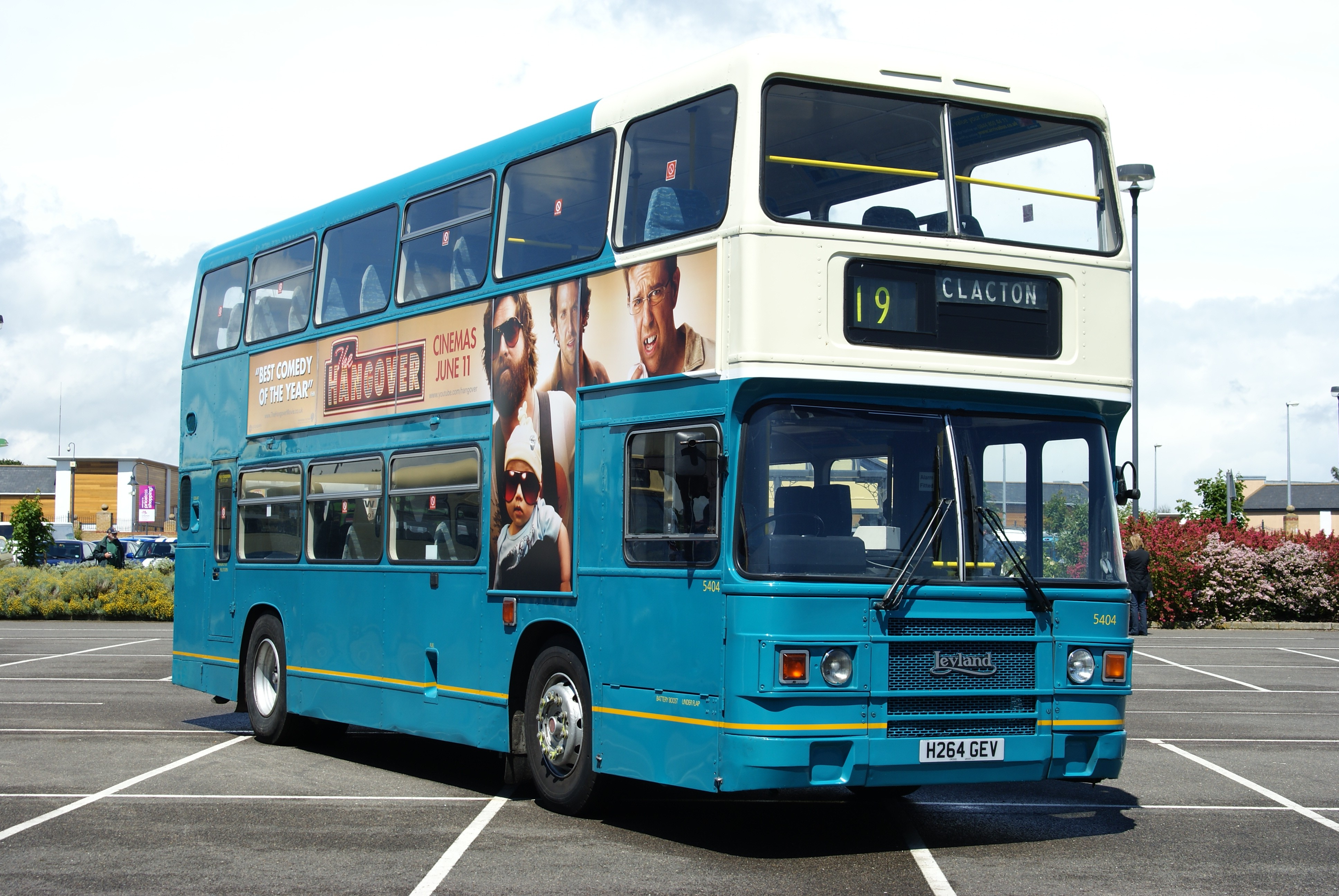
An Arriva Southend bus

Local bus services are provided predominantly by two main companies: Arriva Southend (formerly the council-owned Southend Transport) and First Essex Buses (formerly Eastern National/Thamesway). A smaller operator is Stephensons of Essex.

Southend bus station on Chichester Road was built in 2006 and is known as the Southend Travel Centre; it replaced a temporary facility added in the 1970s. The previous bus station on London Road was run by Eastern National, but it was demolished in the 1980s to make way for a Sainsbury's supermarket. Arriva Southend is the only bus company based in Southend; its depot is located on Short Street (it was previously sited on the corner of London Road and Queensway and it also had a small facility in Tickfield Road). First Essex's buses in the Southend area are based out of the depot in Hadleigh but, prior to the 1980s, Eastern National had depots on London Road (at the bus station) and Fairfax Drive.

First Essex runs the Essex Airlink bus service from the Southend Travel Centre to Stansted Airport.

=== Railway ===
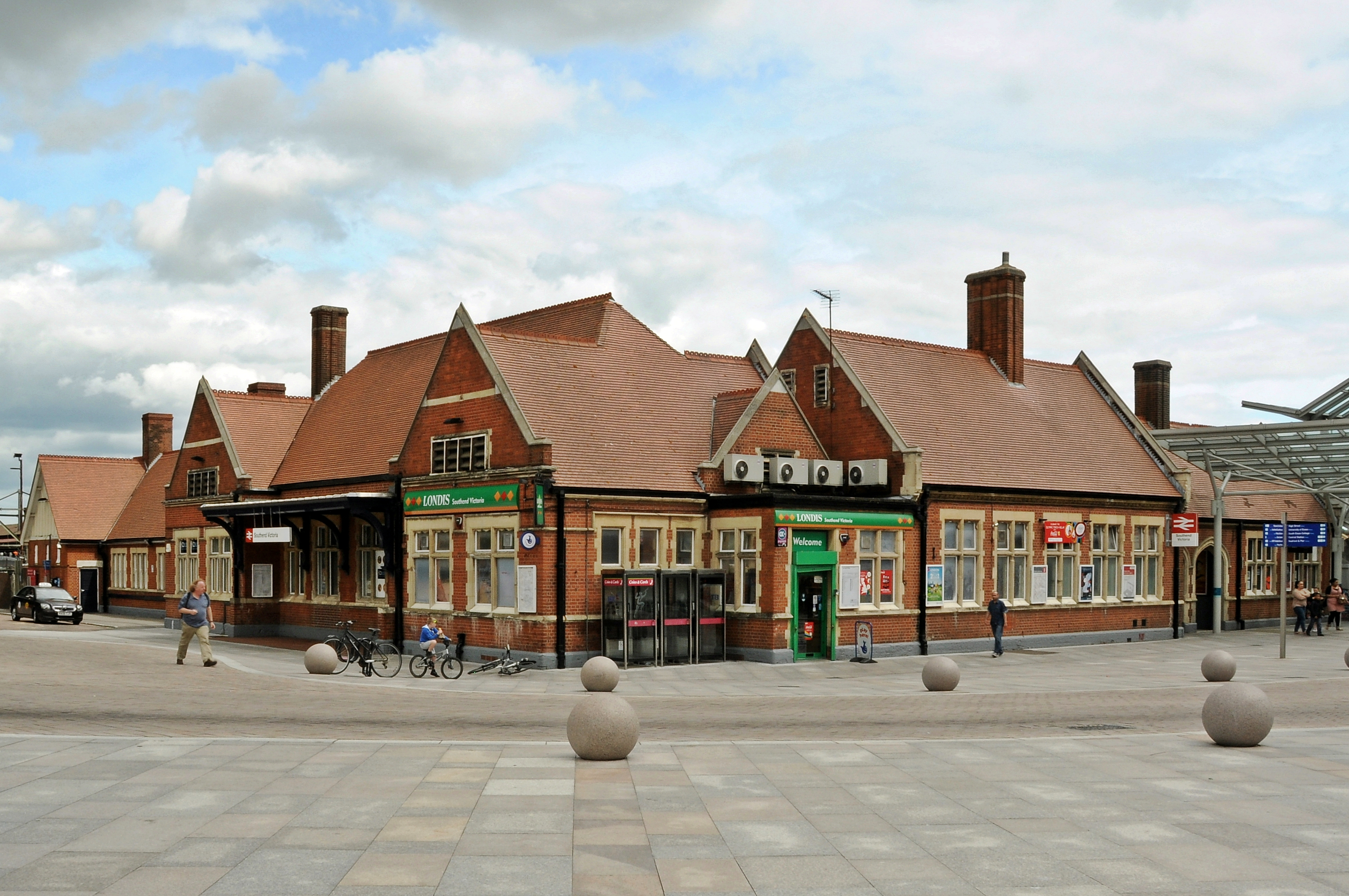
Southend Victoria station

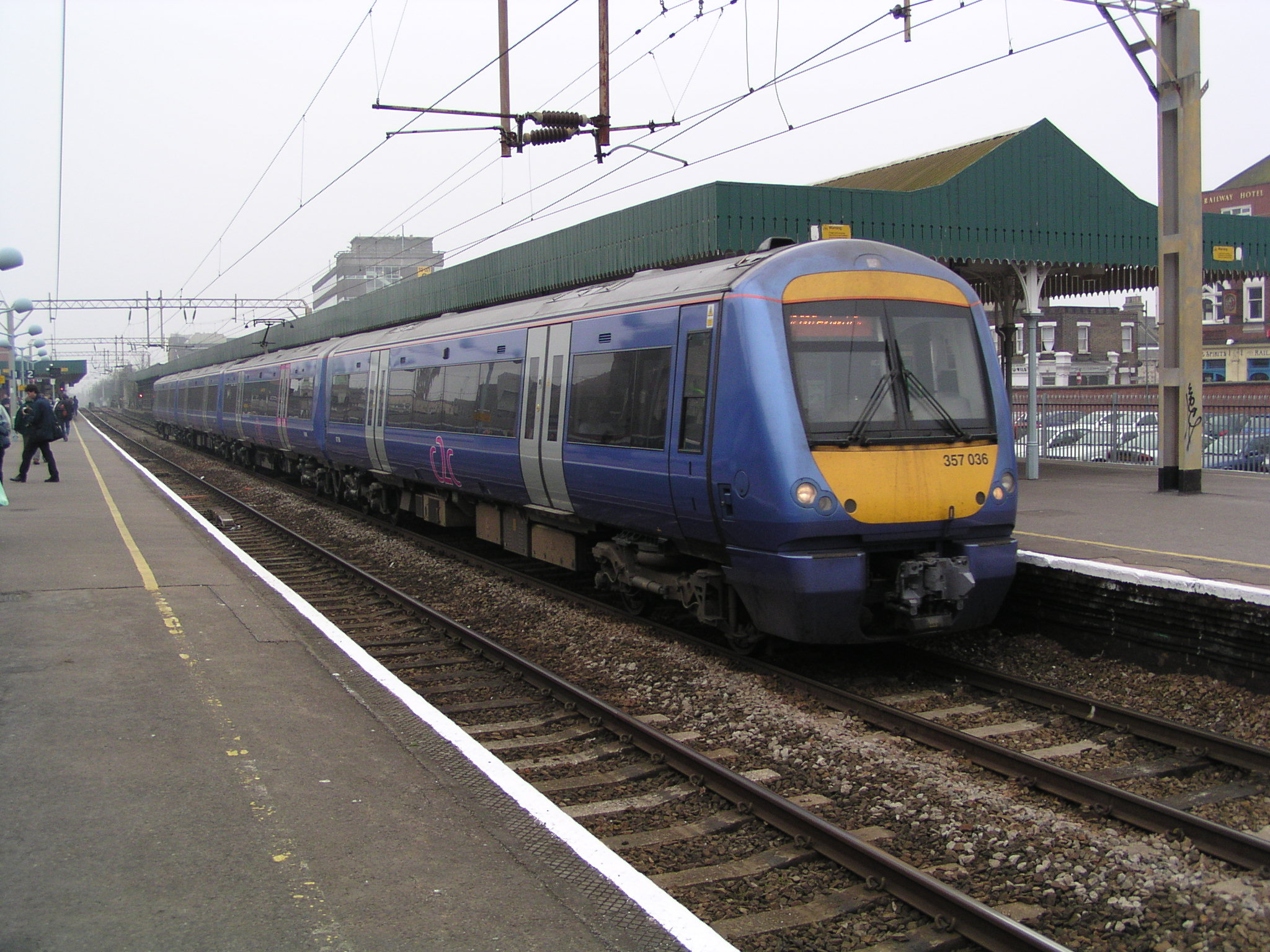
A c2c train at Southend Central station

Southend is served by two lines on the National Rail network:

- Running from Southend Victoria north out of the city is the Shenfield–Southend line, a branch of the Great Eastern Main Line, which is operated by Greater Anglia. Services operate to London Liverpool Street, via Shenfield.
- Running from Shoeburyness, in the east of the borough, to London Fenchurch Street is the London, Tilbury & Southend line operated by c2c. It runs west through Thorpe Bay, Southend East and Southend Central; then either via Benfleet and Basildon or Tilbury Town and Barking. Additionally, one service from Southend Central each weekday evening terminates at Liverpool Street.

From 1910 to 1939, the London Underground's District line's eastbound service ran as far as Southend and Shoeburyness.

=== Roads ===
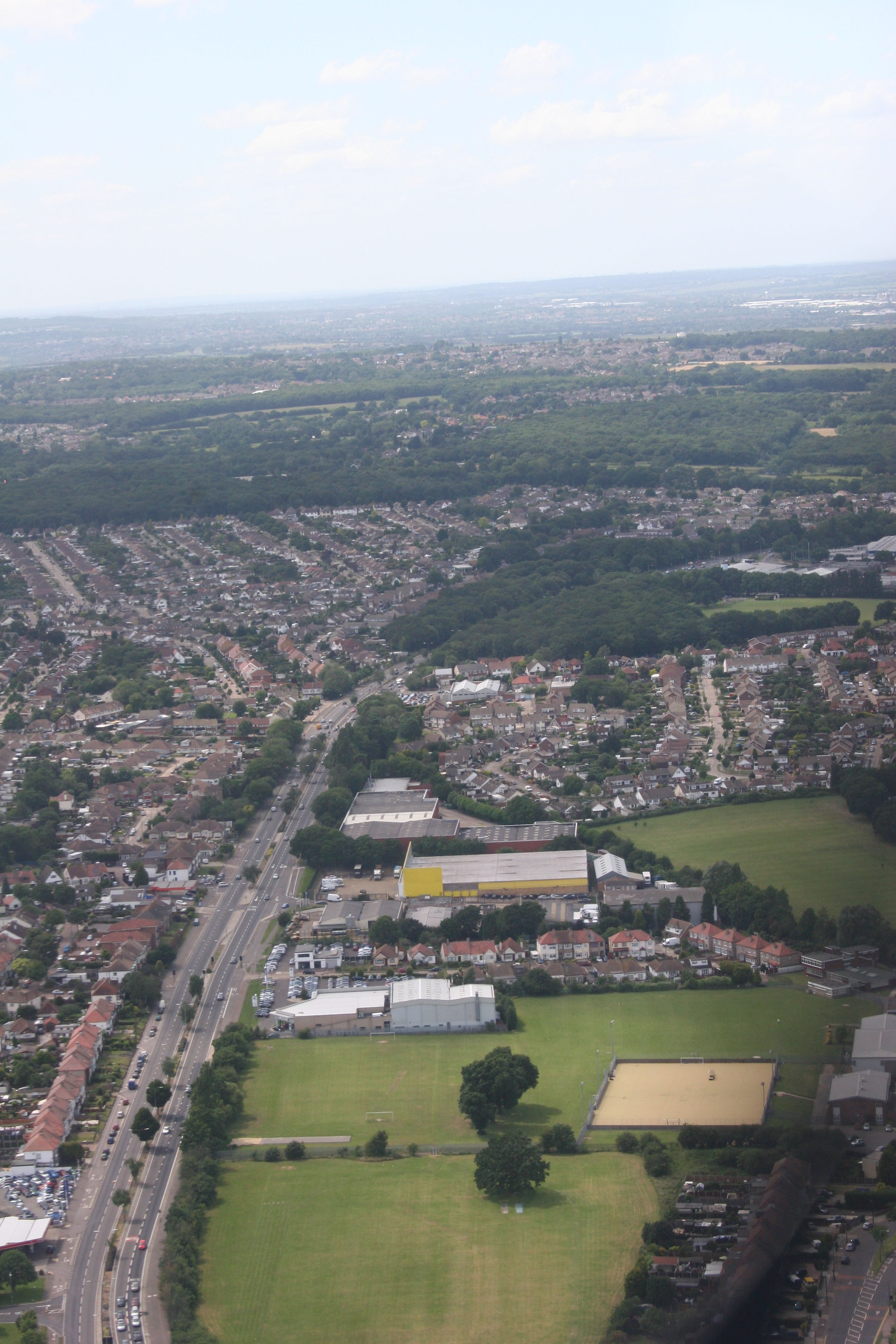
A127 Kent Elms, looking west

Two A-roads connect Southend with London and the rest of the country: the A127 (Southend Arterial Road), via Basildon and Romford, and the A13, via Thurrock and London Docklands. Both are major routes; however, within the borough, the A13 is now a local single-carriageway route, whereas the A127 is entirely dual-carriageway. Both connect to the M25 and eventually London.

== Climate ==
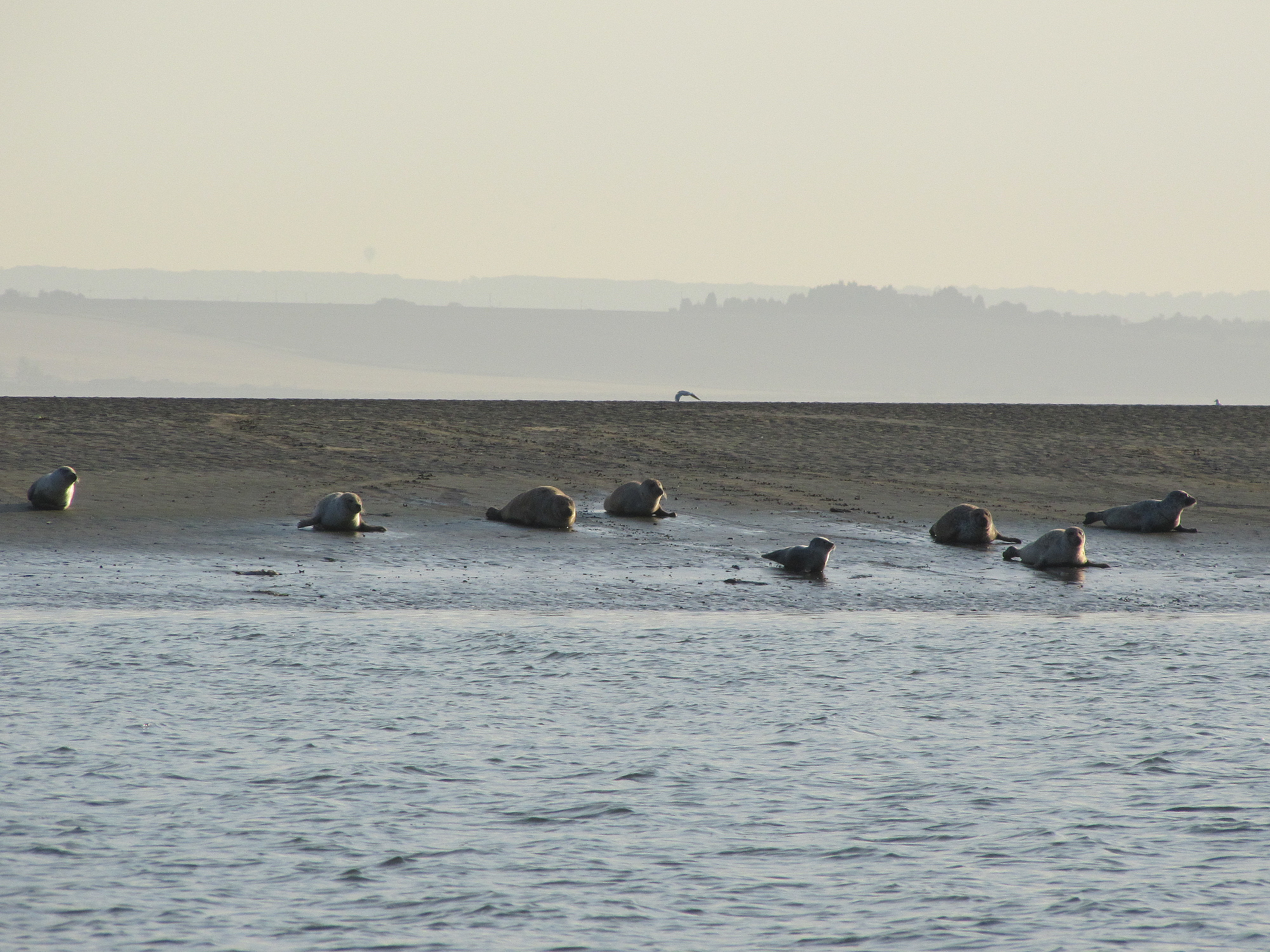
Seals off Southend

Southend-on-Sea is one of the driest places in the UK. It has a marine climate with summer highs of around 22 °C (72 °F) and winters highs being around 7.8 °C (46.0 °F). Summer temperatures are generally slightly cooler than those in London. Frosts are occasional; during the 1991–2020 period, there was an average of 29.6 days of air frost. Rainfall averaged 527 millimetres (20.7 in). Weather station data is available from Shoeburyness, a suburb of the city.

Climate data for Shoeburyness, in eastern part of Southend Urban Area, 2m asl, 1991–2020
Month	Jan	Feb	Mar	Apr	May	Jun	Jul	Aug	Sep	Oct	Nov	Dec	Year
Mean daily maximum °C (°F)	7.8 (46.0)	8.3 (46.9)	10.6 (51.1)	13.5 (56.3)	16.6 (61.9)	19.8 (67.6)	22.3 (72.1)	22.4 (72.3)	19.4 (66.9)	15.3 (59.5)	11.1 (52.0)	8.4 (47.1)	14.7 (58.5)
Mean daily minimum °C (°F)	2.7 (36.9)	2.4 (36.3)	3.7 (38.7)	5.4 (41.7)	8.3 (46.9)	11.2 (52.2)	13.6 (56.5)	13.8 (56.8)	11.5 (52.7)	8.9 (48.0)	5.5 (41.9)	3.2 (37.8)	7.5 (45.5)
Average precipitation mm (inches)	43.0 (1.69)	36.1 (1.42)	32.7 (1.29)	36.1 (1.42)	41.6 (1.64)	44.1 (1.74)	41.1 (1.62)	48.6 (1.91)	43.0 (1.69)	57.8 (2.28)	54.0 (2.13)	48.8 (1.92)	526.8 (20.74)
Average rainy days (≥ 1.0 mm)	9.5	8.3	7.8	7.5	7.5	7.8	7.3	7.1	7.5	10.2	10.6	10.7	102.0
Mean monthly sunshine hours	70.5	88.9	136.8	200.4	241.2	243.3	257.0	212.2	162.4	130.0	84.7	56.9	1,884.3
Source: Met Office

== Education ==
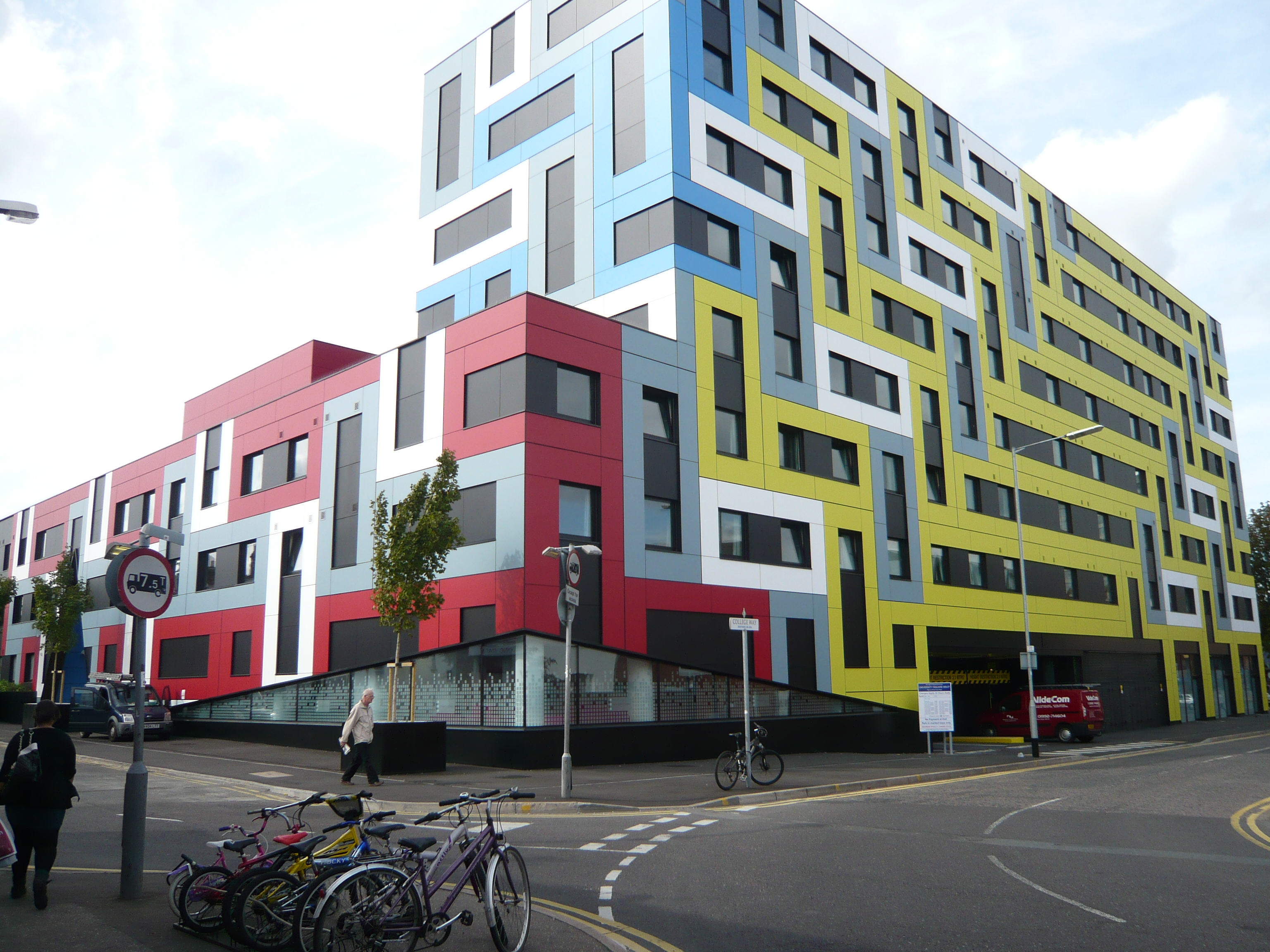
University of Essex accommodation in Southend

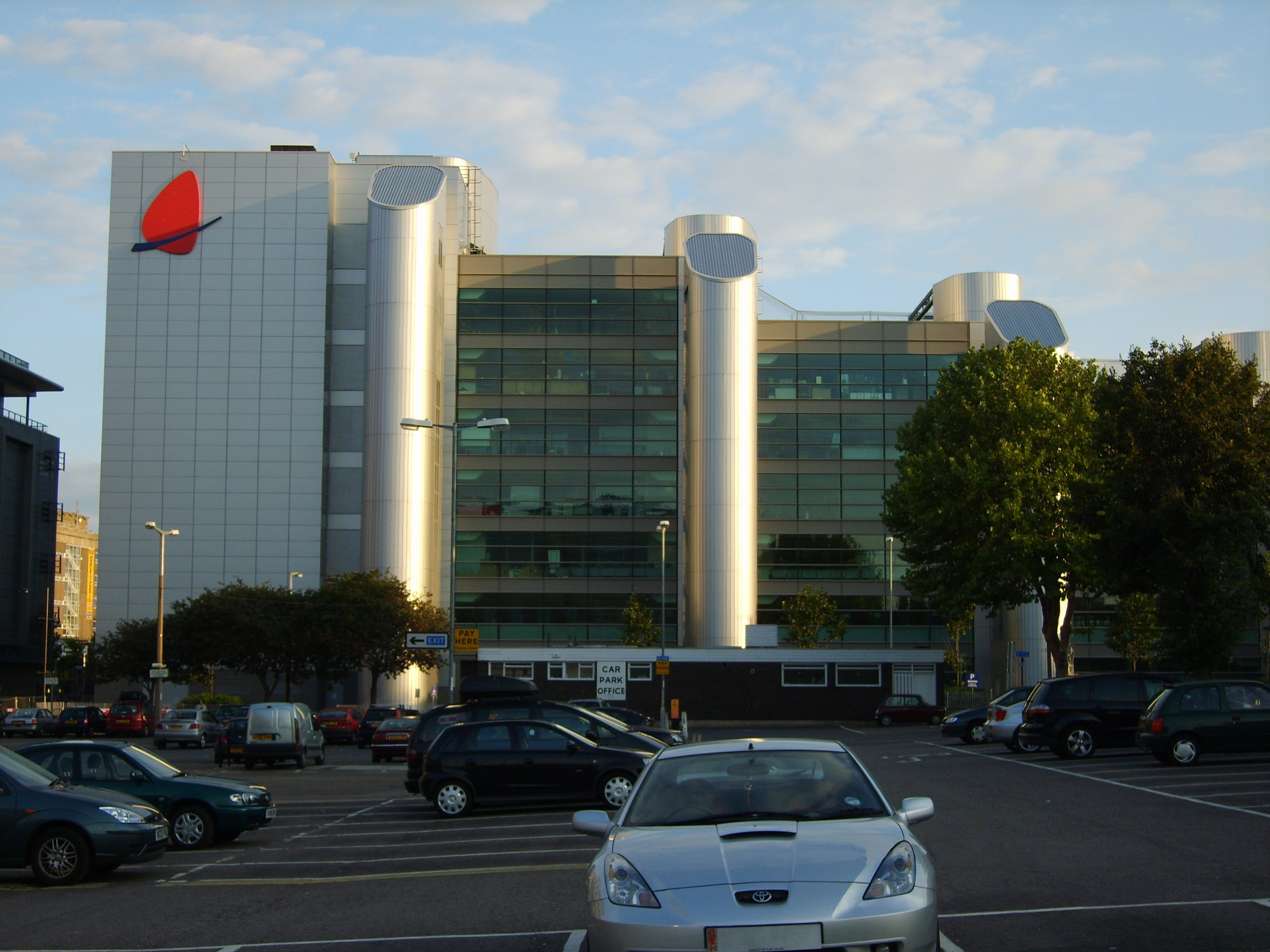
South Essex College's Southend Campus

Southend has a mixture of secondary school offerings. The mainstream secondary schools are mixed-sex comprehensives, while the city retained the grammar school system, which it has four schools. Additionally, there are two single-sex schools assisted by the Roman Catholic Church.

In addition to a number of secondary schools that offer further education, the largest provider is South Essex College in a purpose-built building in the centre of town.

Higher education is provided in the city by the University of Essex. The university has operated from the city since 2003. It also operates the East 15 Acting School Southend campus at the Clifftown Theatre. It was announced in December 2025 that the Southend campus would close in Summer 2026, with courses transferring to the Colchester campus.

== Sport ==
Southend Leisure and Tennis Centre

Southend United is the only professional club in the city. The club was formed in 1906 and has played as high as English football's second tier and three time runners up in the EFL Trophy. It currently competes in the National League, after dropping out of the Football League at the end of the 2020–21 season, after 101 years of participation. Southend Manor, the city's other senior club, plays in the Eastern Counties Football League, the 9th tier in the English football pyramid and are based at Southchurch Park Arena.

There are two rugby union clubs in the city: Southend RFC play in London 1 North, while Westcliff R.F.C. play in London & South East Premier. The city has formerly been home to both the Essex Eels and Southend Invicta rugby league teams. The Essex Pirates basketball team that played in the British Basketball League, were based in the city between 2009 and 2011.

Essex County Cricket Club previously played in Southend for one week a season, until the club withdrew in 2011 after 105 years. The Southend Cricket Festival was held at Chalkwell Park and Southchurch Park, before moving to Garon Park next to the Southend Leisure & Tennis Centre. The only other cricket is local. The world record for the highest ever number of runs scored on one day in a male first class match was set by Australia at Southchurch Park in 1948.

The Old Southendians Hockey Club is based at Warner's Bridge in Southend. Previously, the city had hosted Greyhound racing, initially at the Kursaal football stadium, before the permanent Southend Stadium opened in 1933. The stadium was demolished in 1985.

The eight-lane, floodlit, synthetic athletics track at Southend Leisure and Tennis Centre is home to Southend-on-Sea Athletic Club. The facilities cover all track and field events. The centre has a 25m swimming pool and a world championship level diving pool with 1, 3, 5, 7 and 10m boards, plus springboards with the only 1.3m in the UK.

Southend has hosted a half marathon since 1996.

== Entertainment and culture ==
=== Southend Pleasure Pier ===
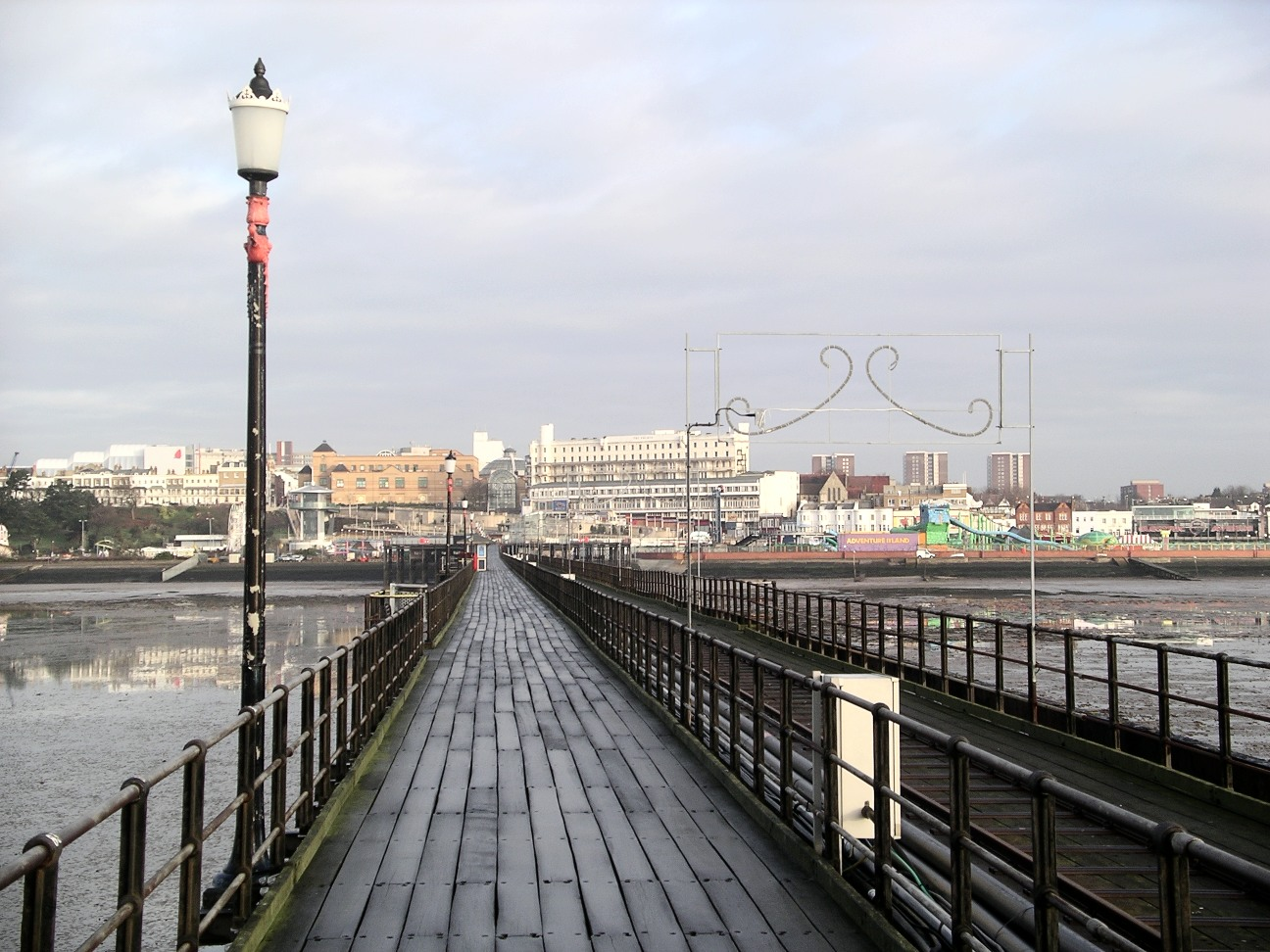
A mile out along the pier

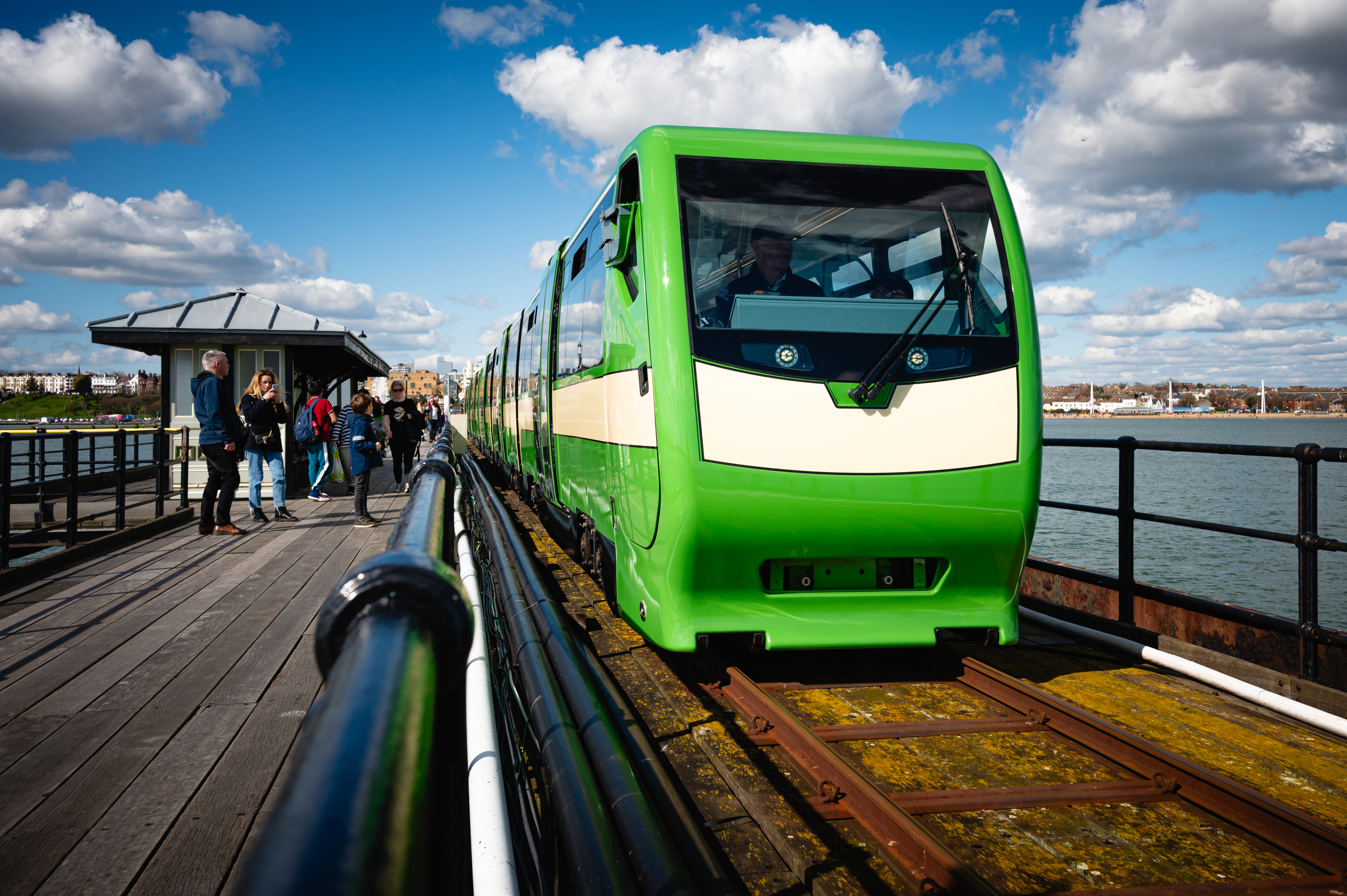
A pier railway train

Southend-on-Sea is home to the world's longest pleasure pier, originally built in 1830 from wood before being replaced in iron during 1889. The pier stretches some 1.34 miles (2.16 km) from shore into the Thames Estuary and is a Grade II listed building. Sir John Betjeman, English poet and broadcaster, once said that "the Pier is Southend, Southend is the Pier". The pier has been home to a narrow gauge railway since 1846.

=== Kursaal ===
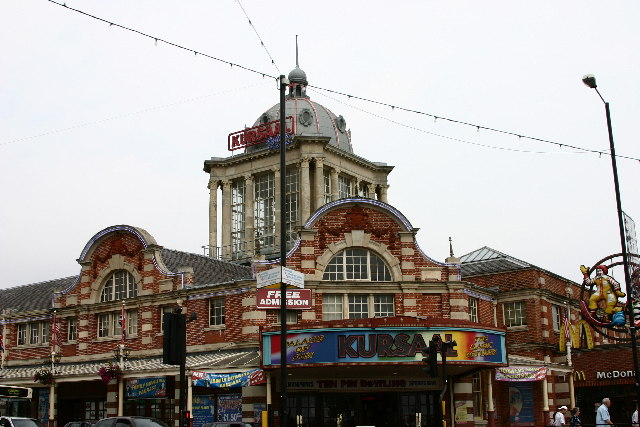
The Kursaal

The Kursaal was one of the earliest theme parks, opening in 1901. It closed in the 1970s and much of the land was developed as housing. The entrance hall, a listed building, was redeveloped to house a bowling alley operated by Megabowl and casino in 1998. However, the bowling alley closed in 2019 and the casino closed in 2020. The building currently stands unused and, in May 2024, The Victorian Society listed the Kursaal amongst their 10 at risk sites that need rescuing.

=== Southend Carnival ===
Southend Carnival had been an annual event since 1906, where it was part of the annual regatta, and was set up to raise funds for the Southend Victoria Cottage Hospital. In 1926, a carnival association was formed, and by 1930, they were raising funds for the building of the new General Hospital with a range of events, including a fete in Chalkwell Park. The parades, which included a daylight and torchlight parades were cut down to just a torchlight parade during the 1990s. The carnival has not run since 2020, although attempts have been made to restart the parade, however the accompanying fair returned in 2023.

=== Cliff Lift ===
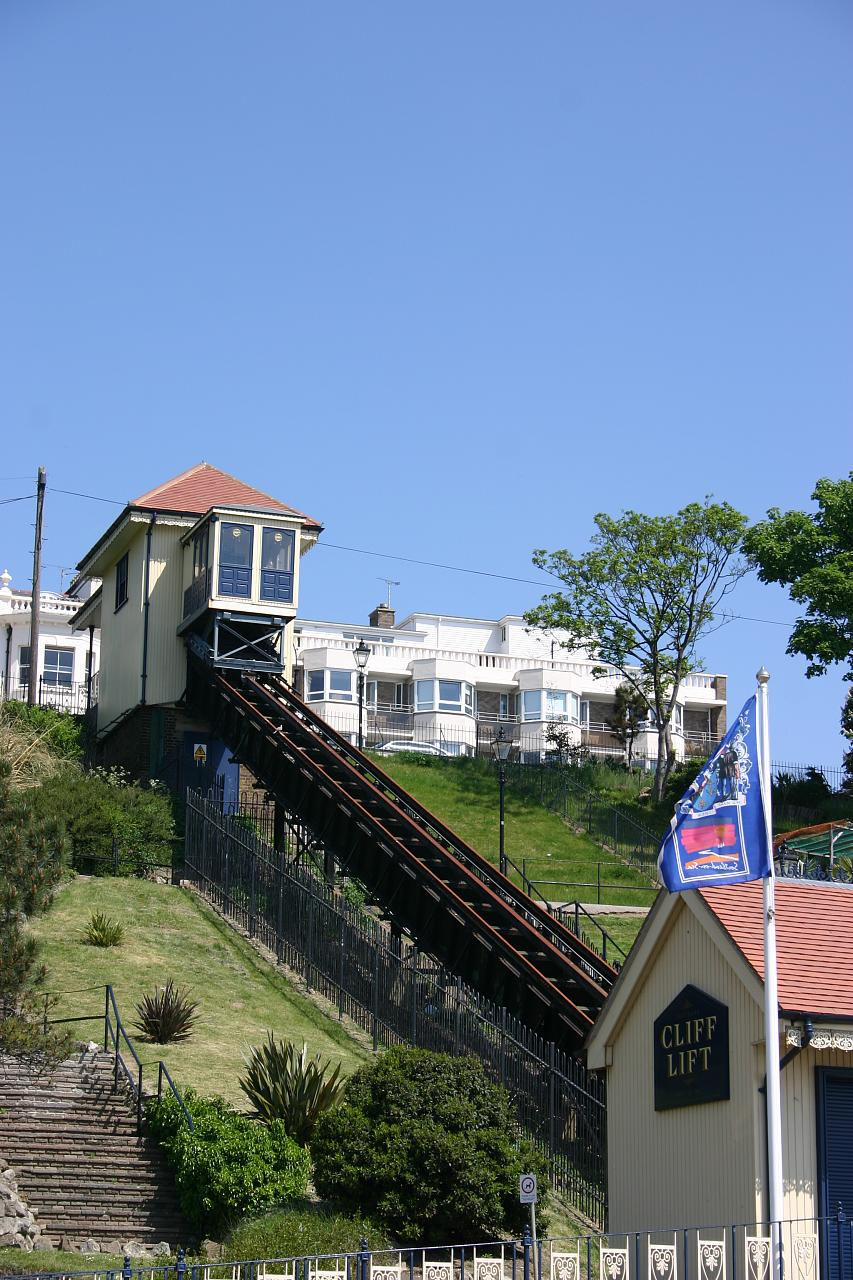
Southend Cliff Railway

A short funicular railway, constructed in 1912, links the seafront to the High Street level of the town. The line runs on the site of a pioneering moving walkway, a forerunner of today's escalator. This was constructed in 1901 by the American engineer Jesse W. Reno, but soon proved noisy and unreliable due its exposed location. The lift re-opened to the public in 2010, following a period of refurbishment.

=== Adventure Island ===
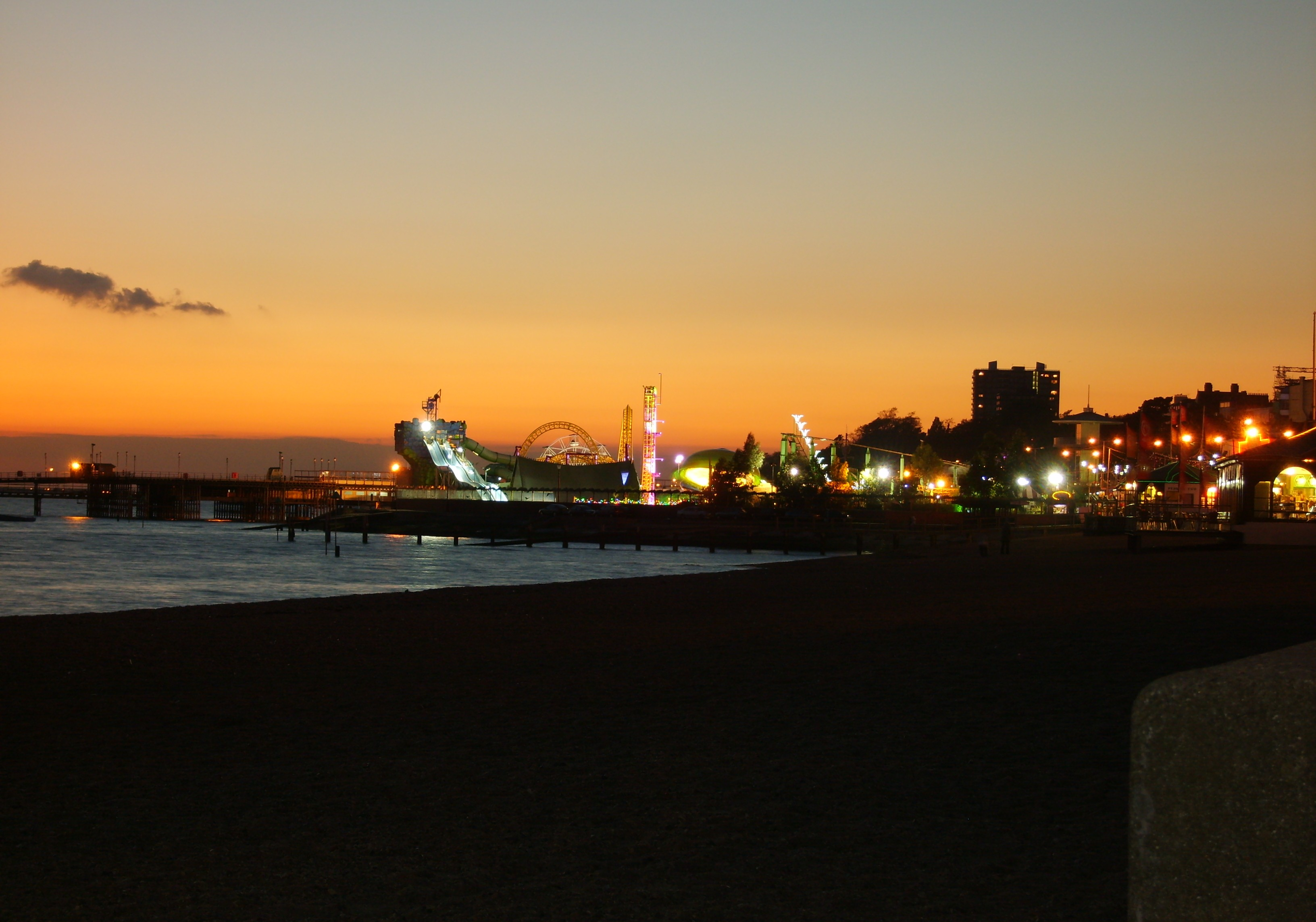
The sunset in Southend, a view of Adventure Island in 2007

Located either side of the pier the esplanade, Adventure Island is an amusement park. The park was originally opened on the west side of the pier as the "Sunken Gardens" in 1926, before becoming Peter Pans Playground. In 1976, the Miller family purchased the site and started to transform it into a modern amusement park. In 1996, the east side of the pier that was formerly a boating lake, was purchased and the park expanded onto the site. In 2010, the theme park entered the Guinness World Records when the record for the number of nude people on a roller coaster. The park won Silver in the "Best Theme Park for Families" at the UK Theme Park Awards in 2022.

=== Other seafront attractions ===
SeaLife Adventure aquarium and zoo is located at the east end of City Beach and has been open since 1993. It is owned by the same company as Adventure Island. The centre received world class accredited status by the British and Irish Association of Zoos and Aquariums in July 2025.

As of May 2024, Southend has four Keep Britain Tidy Blue Flag awarded beaches at East Beach, Shoebury Common, Three Shells and Westcliff Bay. A modern vertical lift links the base of the High Street with the seafront and the new pier entrance.

==== Former attractions ====
The cliff gardens, which included Never Never Land and a Victorian bandstand were an attraction until slippage in 2003 made parts of the cliffs unstable. The bandstand has been removed and re-erected in Priory Park.

=== Festival events ===
The Southend-on-Sea Film Festival is an annual event that began in 2009 and is run by the White Bus film and theatrical company based at The Old Waterworks Arts Center located inside a Victorian era Old Water Works plant. Ray Winstone attended the opening night gala in both 2010 and 2011, and has become the Festival Patron. Southend is also home to Horror-on-Sea festival, again run by the White Bus Company, which was founded in 2013. The festival for independent horror films takes place over two weekends in January.

Since 2021, the city has hosted a Halloween parade in October, while the Leigh Art Trail runs during July. Two events that started in 2022 were Southend City Jam, a street art festival and LuminoCity, a light festival. Southend City Council announced the cancellation of the light festival for 2024 due to budget cuts. The Old Leigh Regatta takes place every September, while Leigh Folk Festival has run since 1992. The Southend Jazz Festival has been run since 2020.

Between 2008 and 2019, Chalkwell Park became home to the Village Green Art & Music Festival for a weekend every July.

The London to Southend Classic Car Run takes place each summer. It is run by the South Eastern Vintage and Classic Vehicle Club.

The Southend Shakedown, organised by Ace Cafe, is an annual event that started in 1998, featuring motorbikes and scooters. It took a three-year hiatus before returning in 2025. There are other scooter runs throughout the year, including the Great London Rideout, which arrives at Southend seafront each year.

=== Parks and nature reserves ===
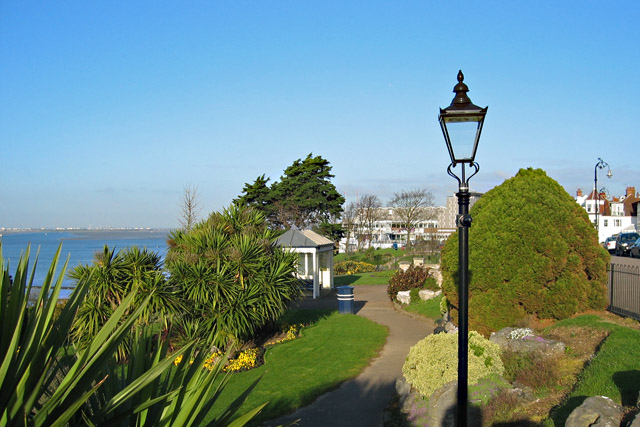
Southend Cliff Gardens

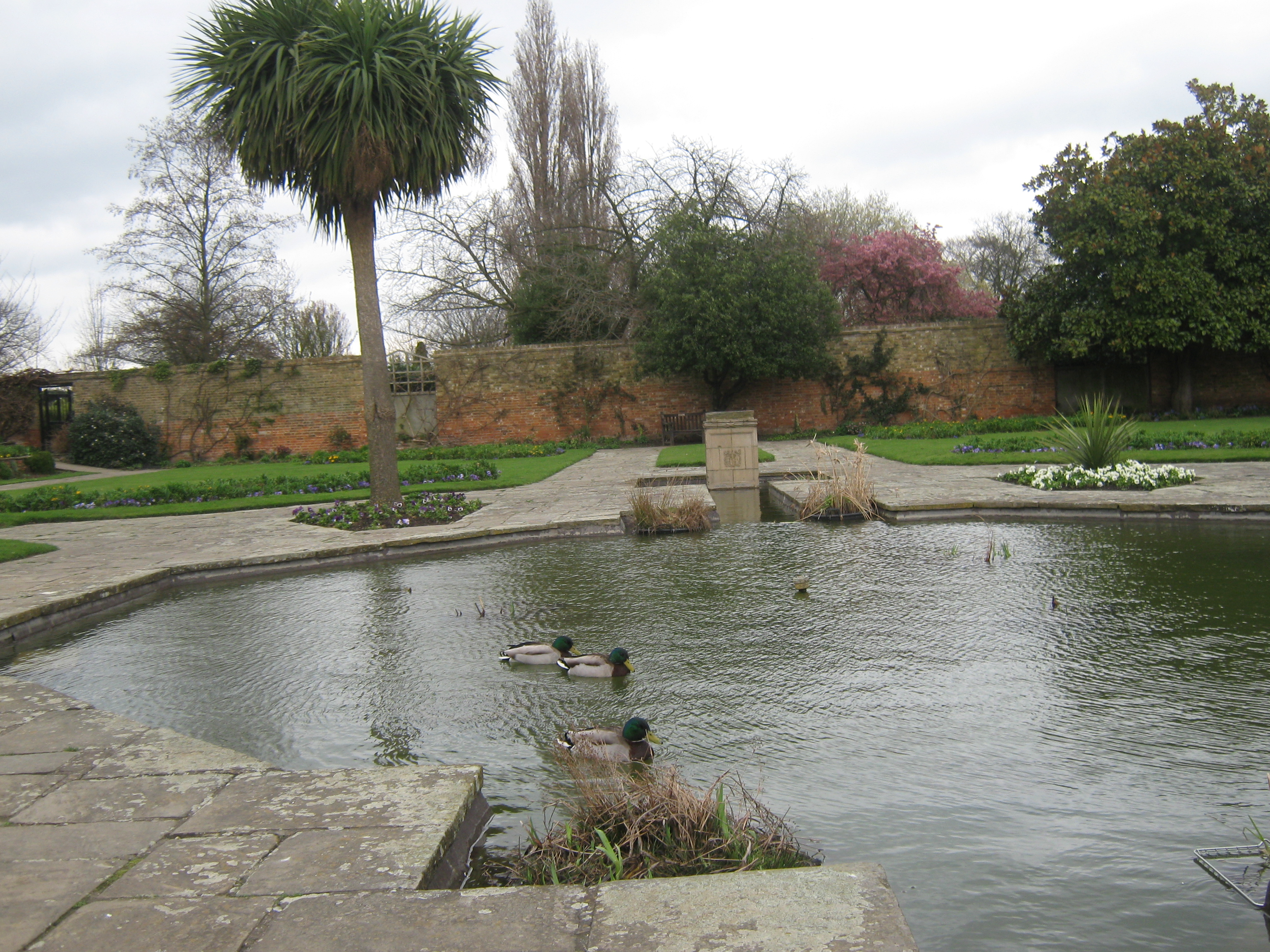
Priory Park

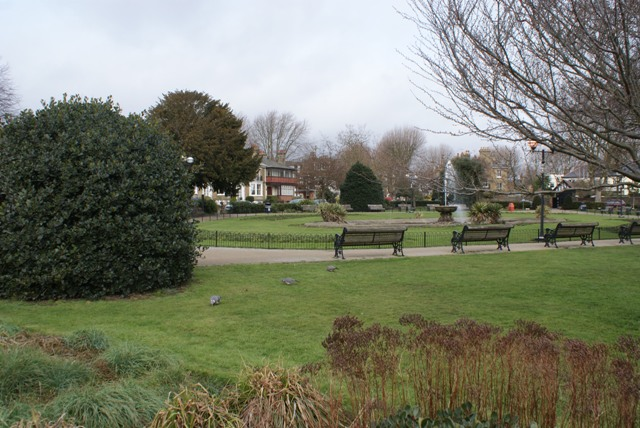
Prittlewell Square

Southend is home to many recreation grounds. Its first formal park to open was Prittlewell Square in the 19th century. Since then Priory Park, Victory Sports Grounds and Jones Corner Recreation Ground were donated by the town benefactor R A Jones. Other formal parks that have opened since are Chalkwell Park and Southchurch Hall along with Southchurch Park, Garon Park and Gunners Park.

Part of Southend's foreshore is designated a Site of Special Scientific Interest, while there are nature reserves at Belfairs and Belton Hills.

=== Conservation areas and architecture ===
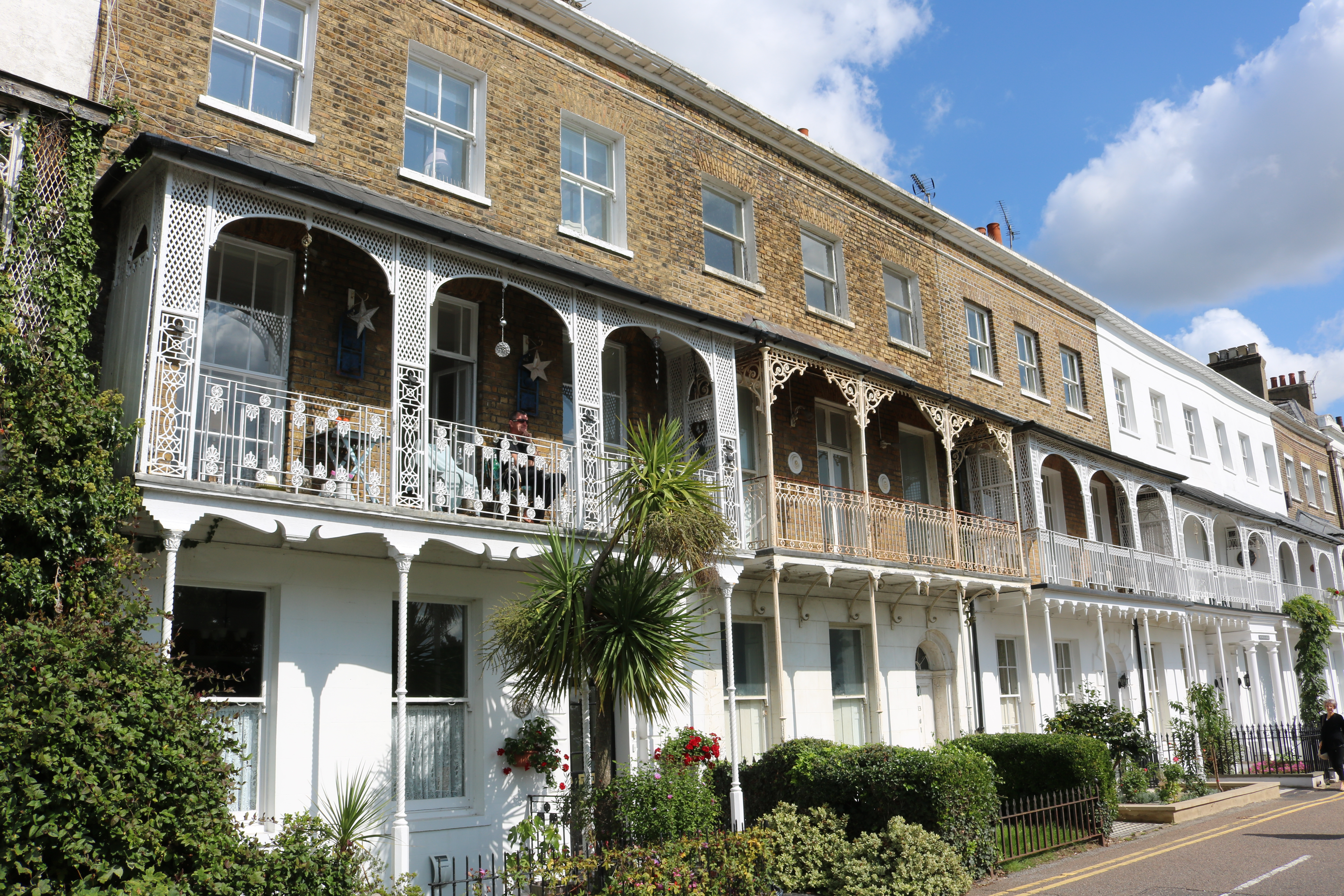
The Royal Terrace, Southend

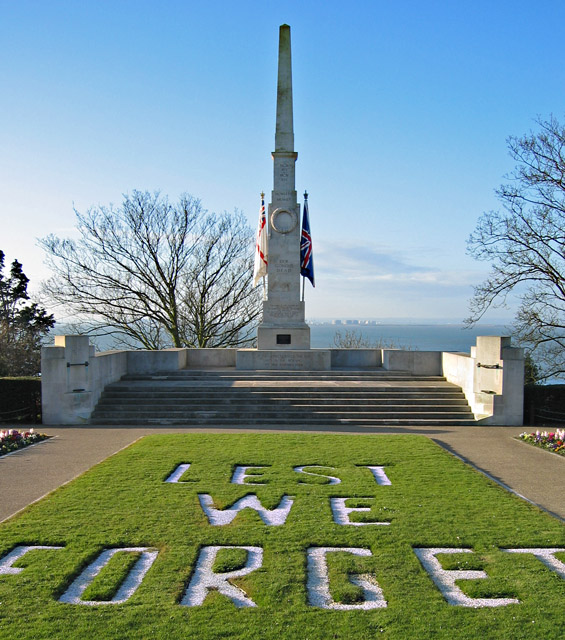
Southend-on-Sea War Memorial

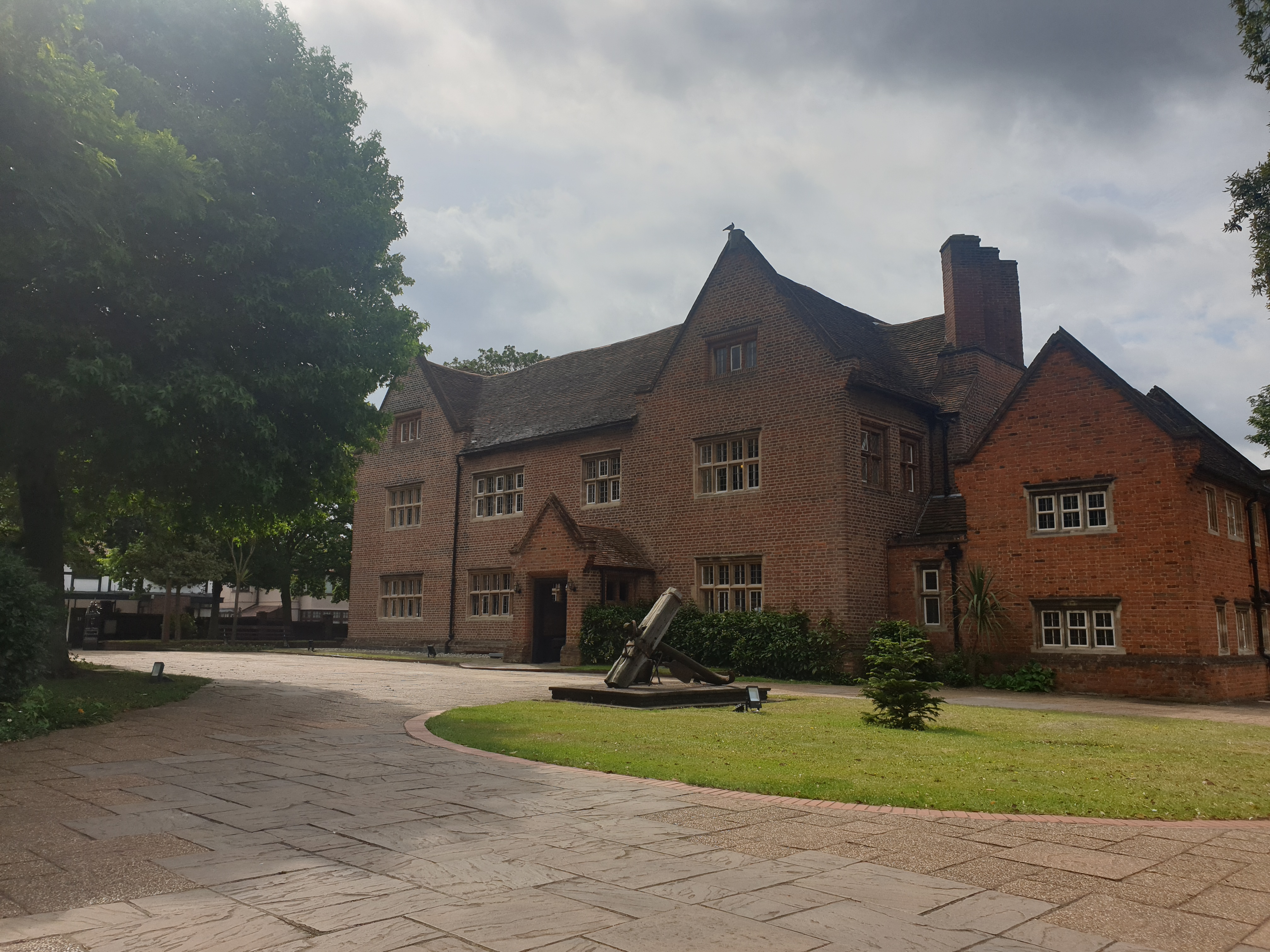
Porters Civic House and Mayor's Parlour, Southchurch Road, Southend-on-Sea

Southend has various conservation areas across the city, with the first being designated in 1968. Nationally Historic England have 124 recorded listed buildings within the city. Five of these are Grade I listed: St Mary's Church, Prittlewell; St Laurence and All Saints Church, Eastwood; Southchurch Hall; Prittlewell Priory and Porters.

=== Art, galleries, museums and libraries ===
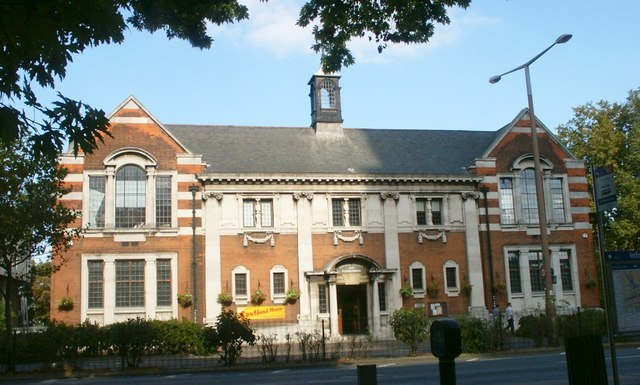
Southend Central Museum, Victoria Avenue

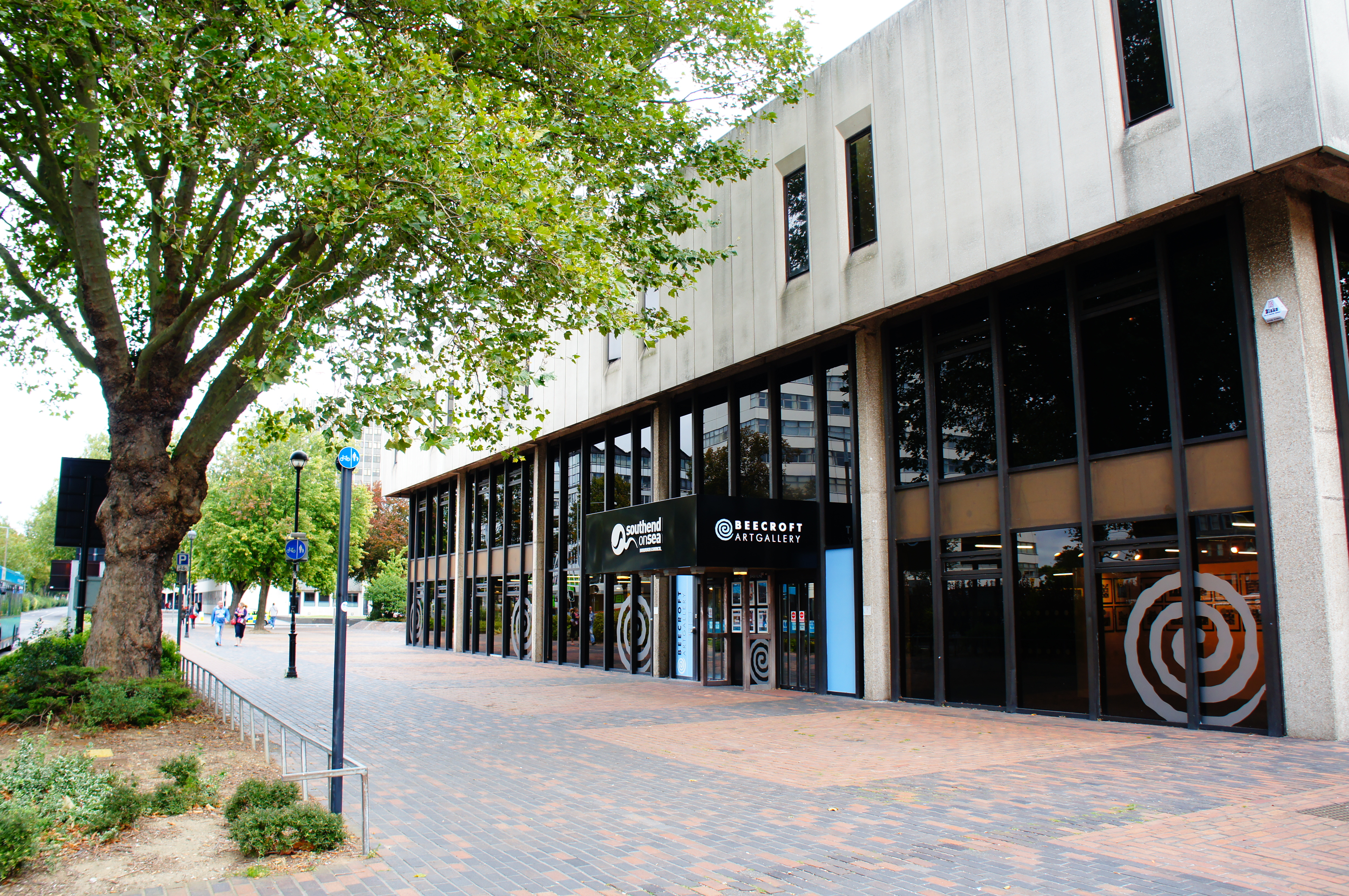
Beecroft Art Gallery, Victoria Avenue

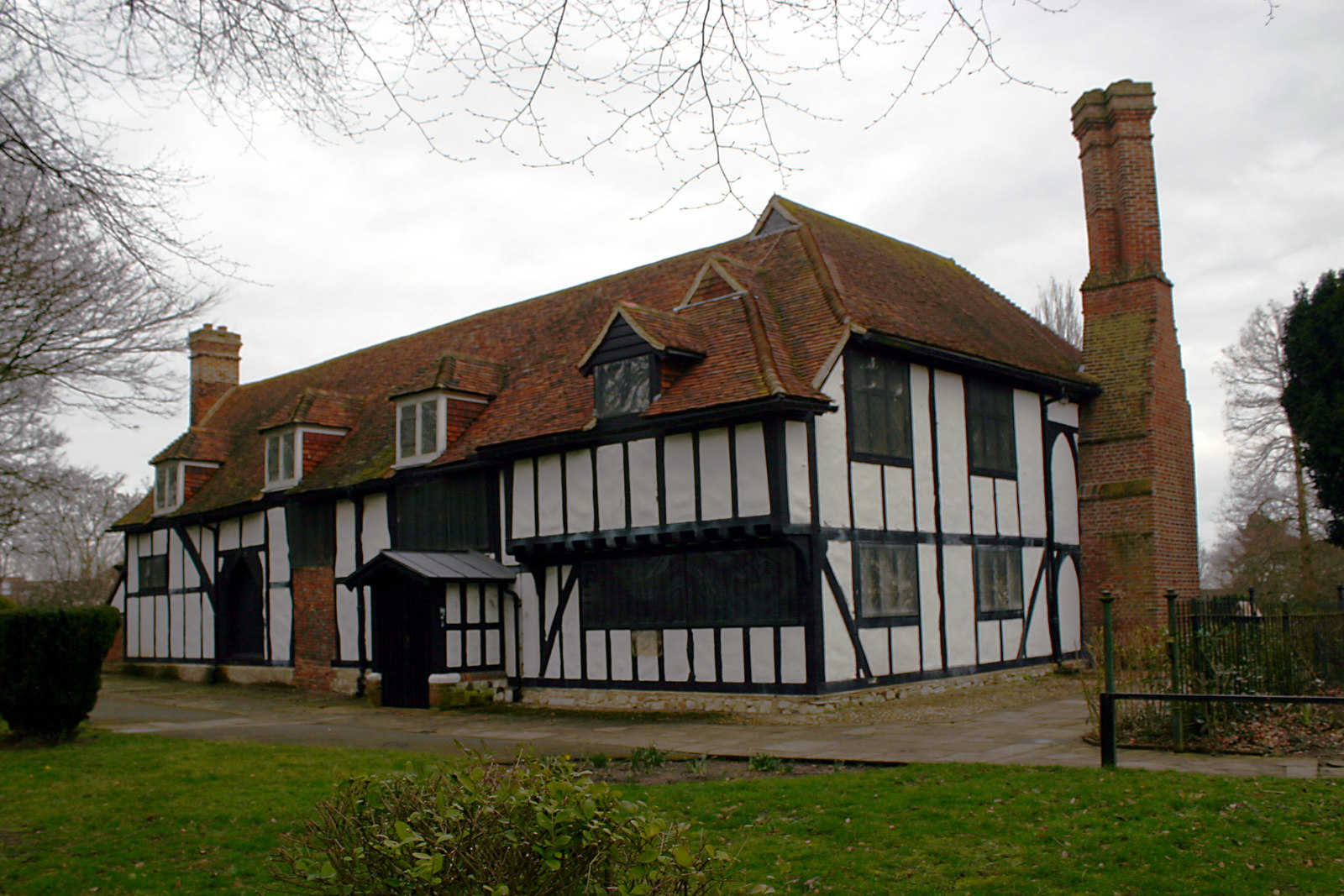
Southchurch Hall

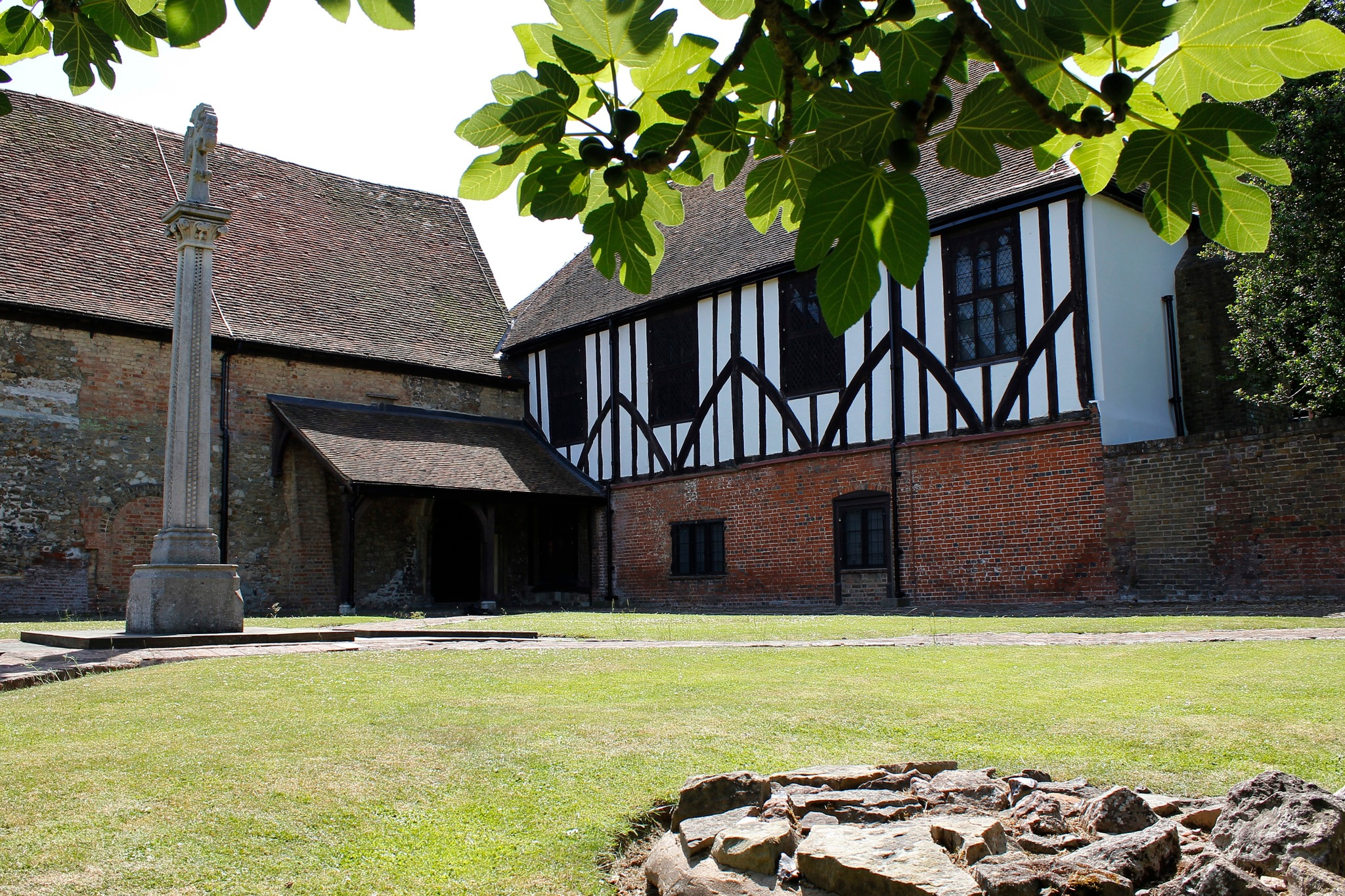
Prittlewell Priory

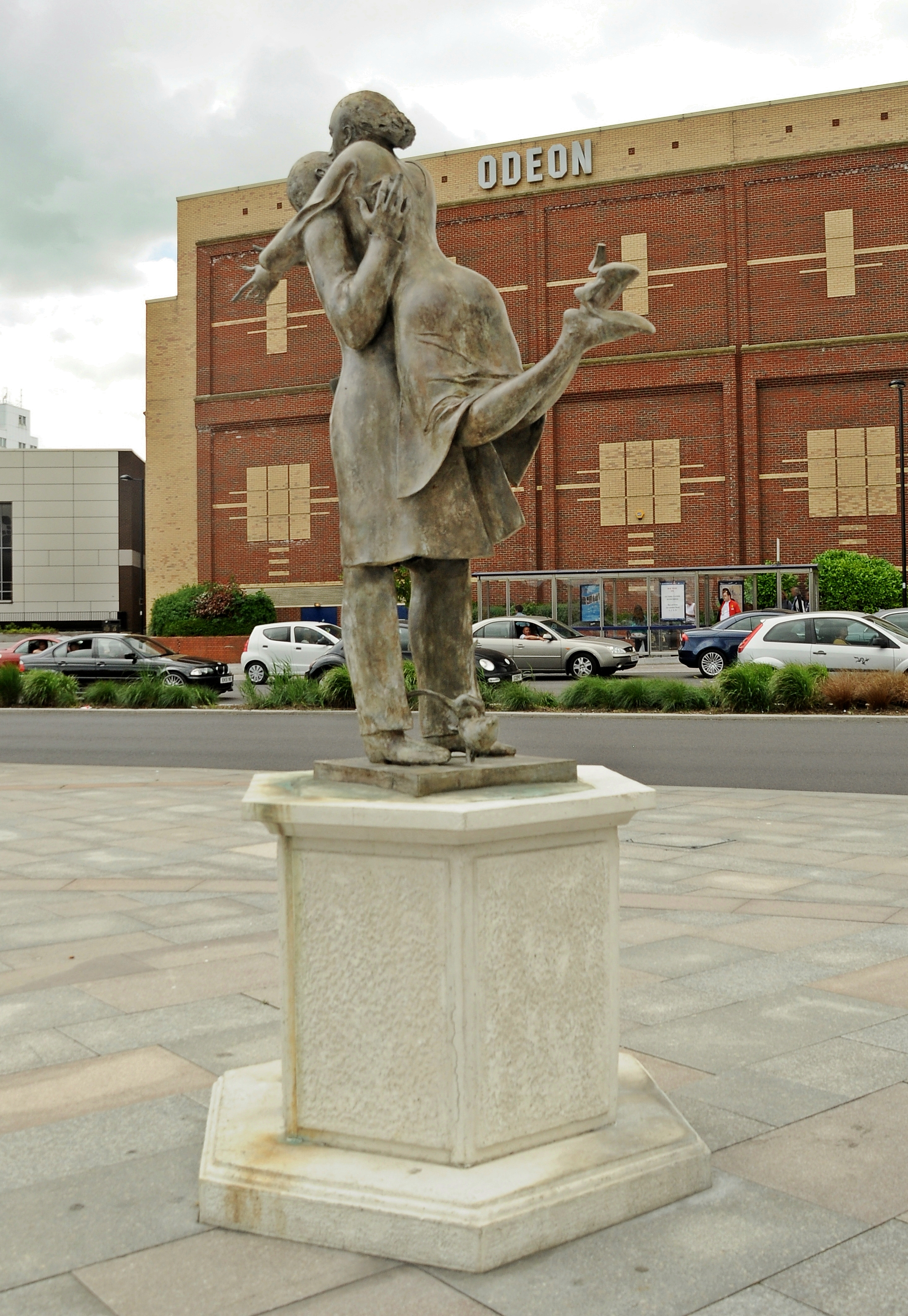
Bronze sculpture called Return located in Victoria Circus, outside Southend Victoria station. Designed by Belgian sculptor Rene Julien. 2011.

Southend Museums, part of Southend on Sea City Council, operates two historic houses, Southchurch Hall and Prittlewell Priory; the Beecroft Art Gallery and the Southend Central Museum and Planetarium. The museums service looks after around 50,000 objects including collections of archaeology, natural history, social history, fashion and textile, fine art and photography. Southend Central Museum is the home of the world-renowned Prittlewell Princely Burial artefacts.

Independent museums and archives include The Jazz Centre UK, a jazz cultural centre, that has operated out of the Beecroft Art Gallery since 2016 and Southend Pier Museum, located on Southend Pier.

Focal Point Gallery, based in The Forum, is South Essex's gallery for contemporary visual art, promoting and commissioning major solo exhibitions, group and thematic shows, a programme of events including performances, film screenings and talks, as well as offsite projects and temporary public artworks. The organisation is funded by Southend-on-Sea City Council and Arts Council England.

The Old Waterworks Arts Centre operates on North Road, Westcliff in the former Victorian water works building. It holds art exhibitions, talks and workshops.

Metal, the art organisation set up by Jude Kelly has been based in Chalkwell Hall since 2006. The organisation offers residency space for artists and also organised the Village Green Art & Music Festival. The park is also home to NetPark, which claims to be the world's first digital art park.

Southend has several small libraries located in Leigh, Westcliff, Kent Elms and Southchurch. The central library has moved from its traditional location on Victoria Avenue to The Forum in Elmer Approach, a new facility paid for by Southend Council, South Essex College and The University of Essex. It replaced the former Farringdon Multistorey Car Park. The old Central Library building (built 1974) has become home to the Beecroft Gallery and the Jazz Centre UK. This building had replaced the former Carnegie funded free library, that opened in 1906, and is now home to the Southend Central Museum.

=== Theatres ===
==== Current venues ====
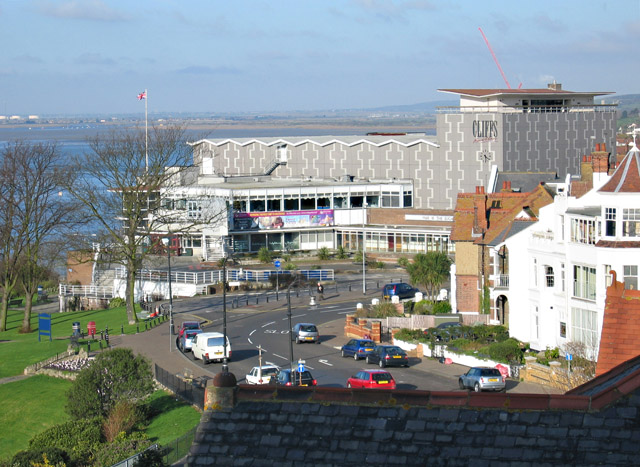
The Cliffs Pavilion

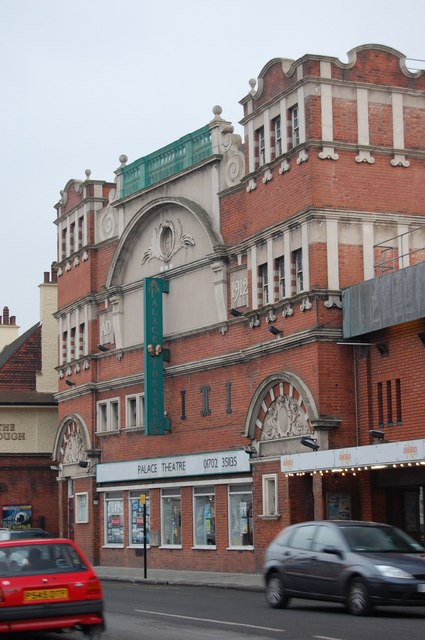
Palace Theatre, Westcliff-on-Sea

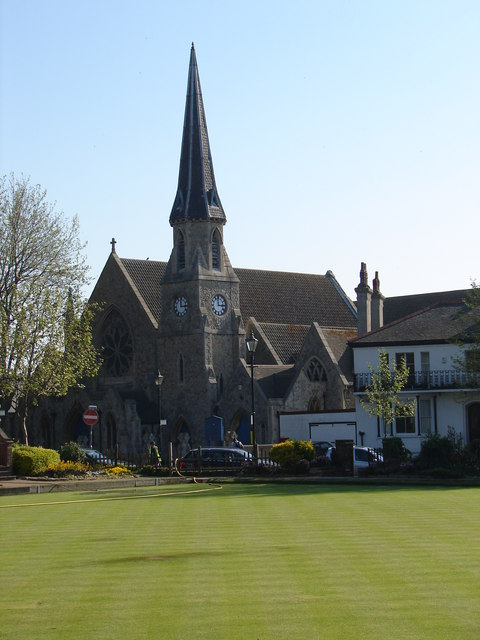
Clifftown Theatre – part of East 15's Southend campus

The Edwardian Palace Theatre is a Grade II listed building that opened in 1912. It shows plays by professional troupes and repertory groups, as well as comedy acts. The theatre has two circles and the steepest rake in Britain. The theatre was given to the town by its then owner Gertrude Mouillot in 1942, on the condition that local amateur groups could continue to use the theatre. A smaller venue called The Dixon Studio was added in the early 1980s after a fundraising campaign by the Palace Theatre Trust led by John F Dixon.

The Cliffs Pavilion is the largest purpose built arts venue in Essex. Plans for a theatre on the site started in 1935 but was suspended by the outbreak of World War II. After the war, work was started on building a theatre that could host shows, concerts and private functions. The building was opened by the actor, writer and director Sir Bernard Miles in July 1964, with the first show opening the next day starring Norman Vaughan and his troupe of dancers, the Swinging Lovelies. In 1991–92, the site was extended with a new Foyer Bar and a balcony added to the auditorium, increasing the capacity to 1,600. The venue hosts a variety of concerts, shows and performances on ice, as well as pantomimes at Christmas. Artists that have performed at the Cliffs include Paul McCartney and Oasis, whose live DVD Live by the Sea was recorded at the Cliffs.

The Clifftown Theatre is located in the former Clifftown United Reformed Church and as well as regular performances is part of the East 15 Acting School campus.

==== Former venues ====
The New Empire Theatre closed in 2009. Unlike the Cliffs Pavilion or the Palace Theatre, the theatre was privately run, and hosted more amateur groups. The theatre was converted from the old ABC Cinema, which had previously been the Empire Theatre built in 1896. The theatre closed after a dispute between the trust that ran the theatre and its owners. The building was badly damaged by fire on Saturday 1 August 2015 and was demolished in 2017.

Other former venues included the Floral Hall on Western Esplanade that burnt down in 1937, while the Sundeck Theatre was at the pier head and hosted acts like Arthur English, until it closed and was converted to the Diamond Horseshoe Showbar which was destroyed by fire in 1976. The largest lost theatre was the Hippodrome in Southchurch Road, designed by Bertie Crewe, which opened in 1909. The theatre could hold 1,750 on three tiers, hosting acts like Harry Houdini, but was purchased by Gaumont Theatres and was converted to a cinema in 1933.

=== Cinema and film ===
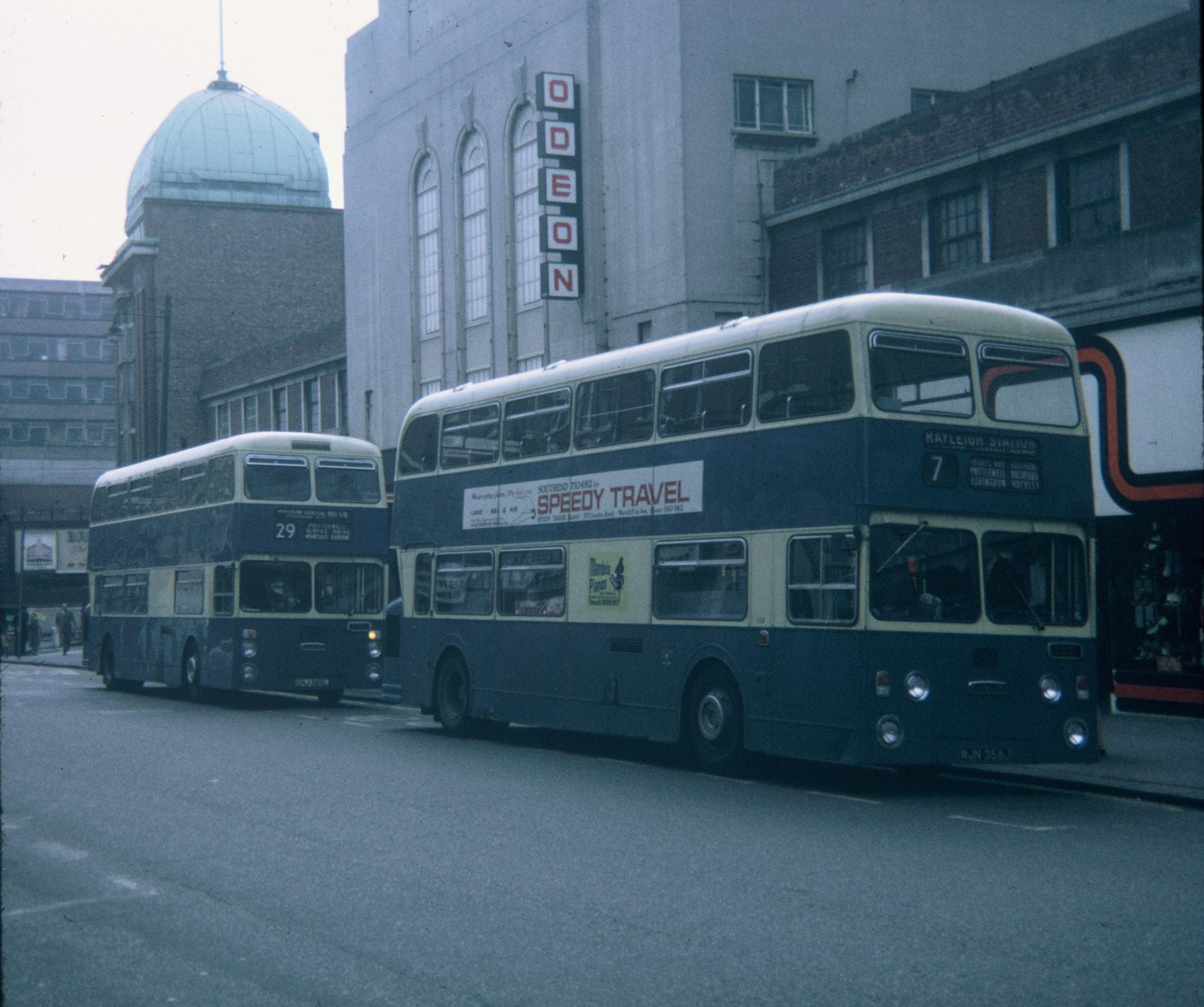
Former Astoria/Odeon cinema – High Street

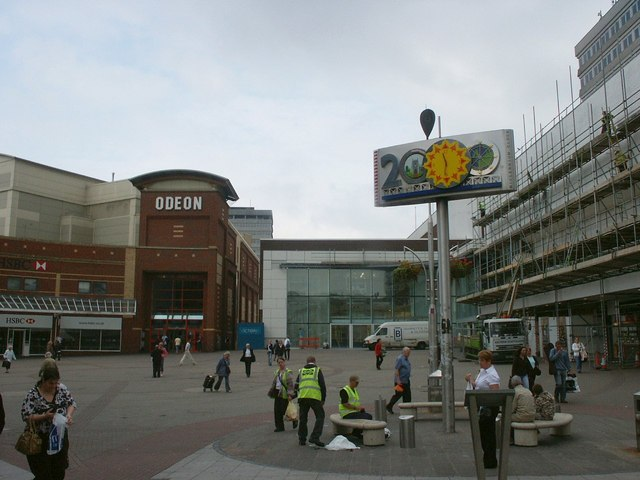
The current Odeon

Southend has one cinema – the Odeon Multiplex at Victoria Circus, which has eight screens. The borough of Southend had, at one time, a total of 18 cinema theatres, with the most famous being the Odeon (formerly the Astoria Theatre), which as well as showing films hosted live entertainers including the Beatles and Laurel and Hardy. This building no longer stands having been replaced by the Southend Campus of the University of Essex.

==== On film ====
Southend has appeared in films over the years, with the New York New York arcade on Marine Parade being used in the British gangster flick Essex Boys, the premiere of which took place at the Southend Odeon. Southend Airport was used for the filming of the James Bond film Goldfinger. Part of the 1989 black comedy film Killing Dad was set and filmed in Southend, while Stephen Poliakoff used several locations in the city to film his 1981 film Bloody Kids. Southend and the surrounding areas were heavily used and featured in the Viral Marketing for the Universal Pictures 2022 American science fiction action film sequel Jurassic World Dominion.

=== Music ===
==== Venues ====
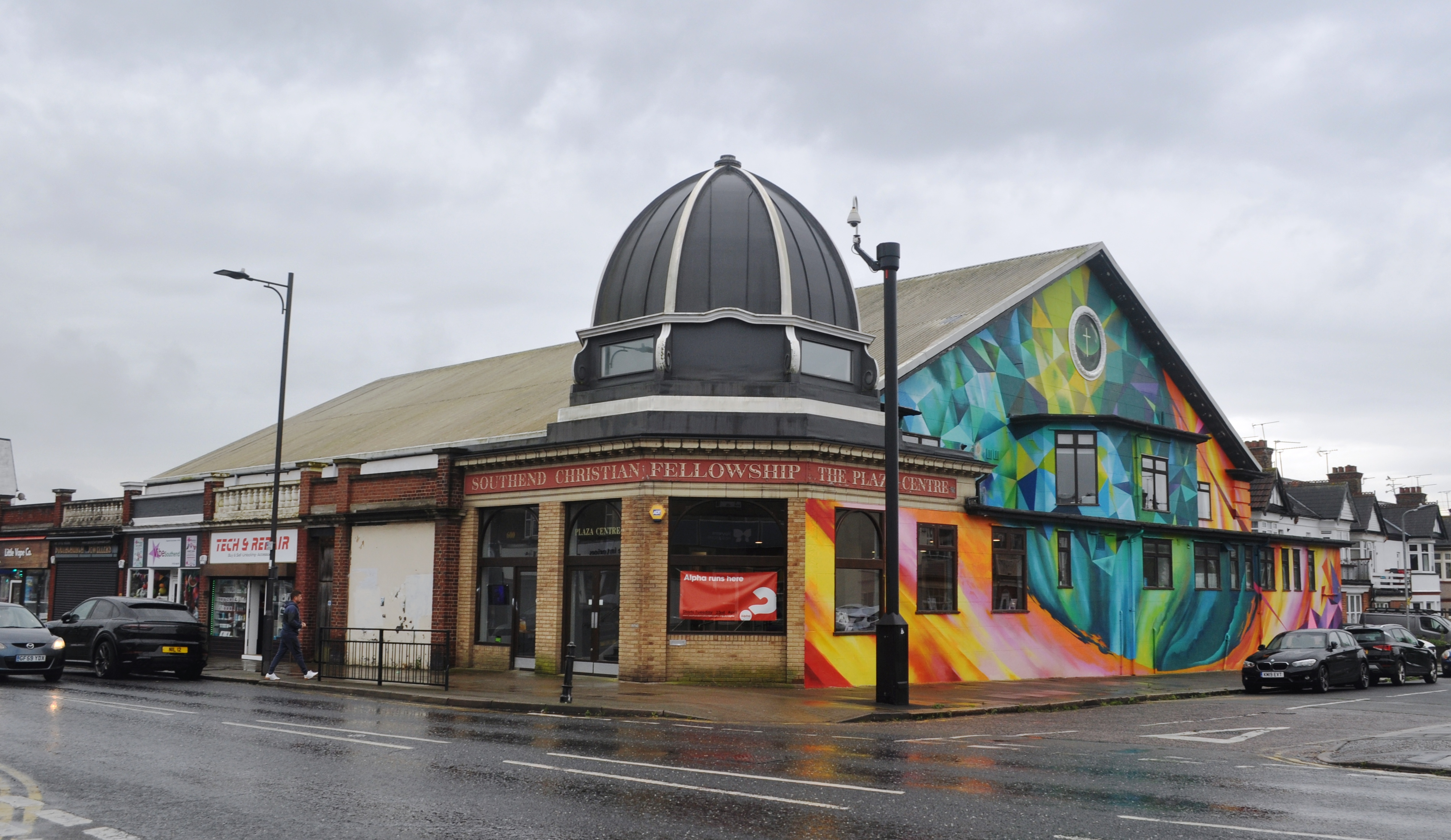
The Plaza Centre, Southchurch Road

Southend's primary music venues are Chinnerys, formerly Ivy House, and the Cliffs Pavilion. Chinnerys is a 400-person capacity club which has hosted the likes of the Arctic Monkeys, The Charlatans and The Libertines. The Plaza, a Christian community centre and concert hall based on Southchurch Road that had previously been a cinema, regularly hosts concert performances.

==== Former venues ====
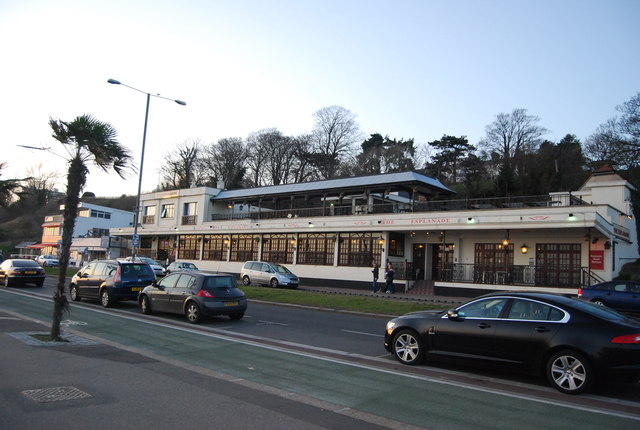
The former Esplanade pub, now demolished

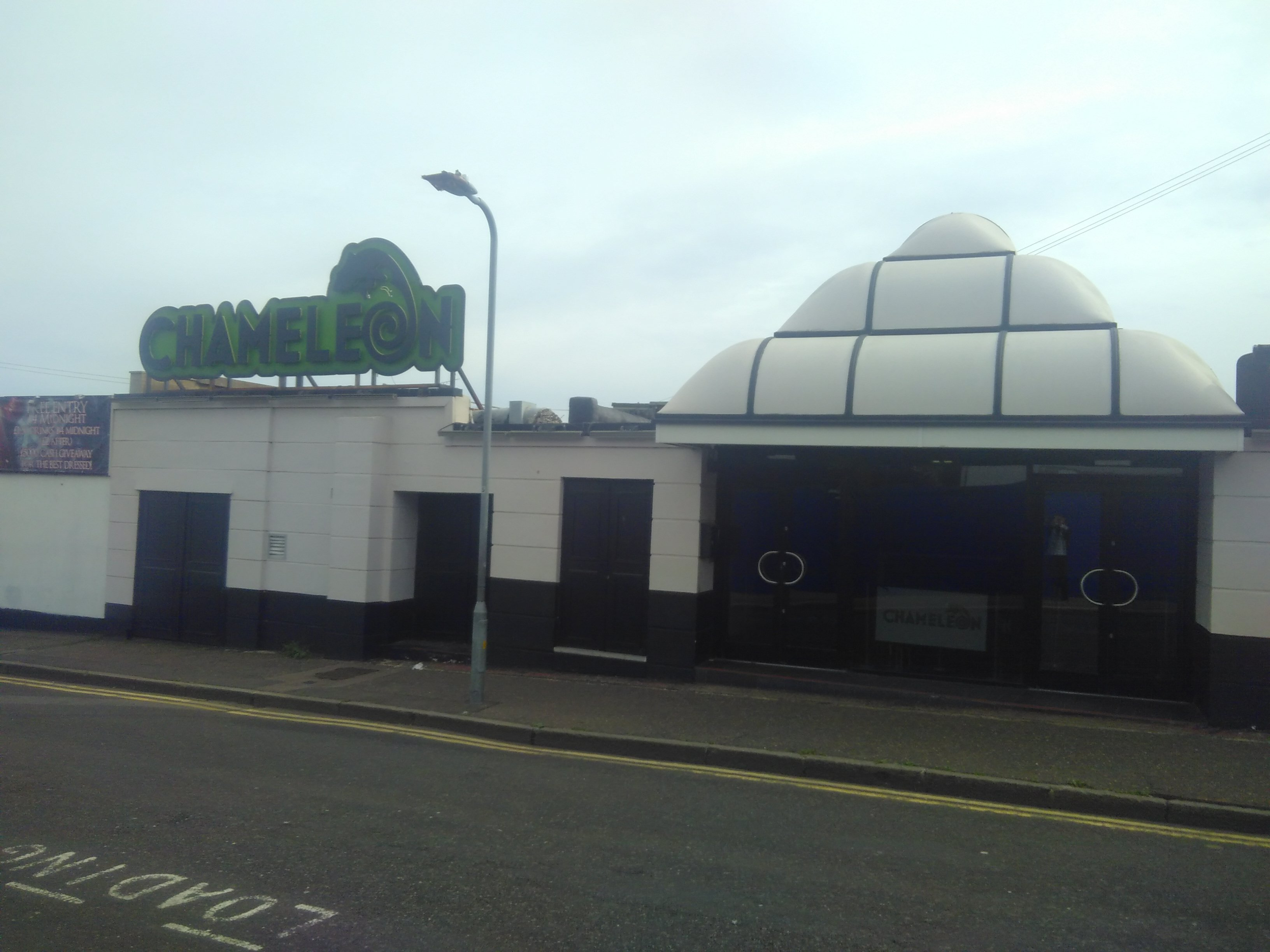
Chameleon Nightclub in Lucy Road, Southend

The city has previously had some well-known venues:

- The Kursaal Ballroom hosted many of the big dance bands of the 20s and 40s. During the 1970s it became a renowned rock music venue, hosting acts such as Black Sabbath, Deep Purple, Thin Lizzy, Queen and AC/DC. Dr. Feelgood recorded their Going back home album which was also recorded on film. A photograph of the performance of AC/DC at The Kursaal in 1977 was used on the front cover of their Let There Be Rock album.
- Talk of the Town South in Lucy Road, opened in 1972 as a cabaret club and discotheque, with The Stage reporting at the time

It was felt for a long time that Southend had paid too much attention to the younger generation and not nearly enough to the over-thirties and so it was, with this fact in mind, that the designers worked their overtime in an attempt to create decor suitable to marry different generations of people together quite compatibly. In the four months that Talk of the South has been operational, its results have proved so tremendously successful that managing director Manzi now feels sure that the cabaret that has been previously missing from the area has not only been required, but indeed needed, for some considerable time.

The club hosted big names including The New Seekers, Frankie Howerd, Buddy Greco, Des O'Connor and Roy Orbison. The club morphed first into TOTS, then into TOTS 2000 in 1993 before becoming Talk nightclub in 2001. In 2015, Snoop Dogg held a DJ set at the club. The club closed for the last time on New Year's Eve 2019.

- The Esplanade pub was once a regular music venue. Situated on Western Esplanade, the building was opened in 1900. In the 70s it ran as a Pub Rock venue, called the Grand Canyon Club with the likes of Dr. Feelgood performing there, while in 90s it hosted bands such as Pearl Jam, Sneaker Pimps, Reef and Catatonia.
- Originally opened as Mr. B's in the 1980s and hosted acts like The Prodigy. It was reopened as Adlib in 1994 by Dick de Vigne and Ian Reading, hosting a host of big name DJs including Jeremy Healy, Paul Oakenfold and Pete Tong at Glow nights, and the likes of Atomic Kitten and Steps at Outrage nights. In October 1999, the club night Rage controversially held a Halloween party with act Nightmare, with Southend East MP, Sir Teddy Taylor, saying,

This kind of horrific display will simply give a bad name to the Southend nightclub scene. Of course Halloween is meant to be a time of fun and celebration. I don't feel these grotesque displays are in that vein. This is simply part of a nasty culture growing up in parts of London which I don't think we want in Southend at all. How does it add to people's enjoyment to see people being dismembered and beheaded?

The club was bought by Luminar Leisure and in 2000 was refurbished and renamed as Chameleon. Chameleon hosted various club nights, but was known for its alternative Panic night on Fridays, which hosted DJs like Radio 1's Daniel P. Carter until it ended in 2018. The club hosted the first Luck N Neat Juniors rave outside of London in April 2019. Later that year, owner Dick de Vigne put the club up for sale, however the club remained open until the Covid lockdown and has never reopened.

- For twenty years, the Sunrooms in Market Place, Southend hosted a variety of big name DJs including Scroobius Pip and Nina Kraviz before closing in 2013.

==== Southend scene ====
Southend has had a nationally renowned rock music scene since the 1960s. The Paramounts had chart success in the early 1960s, before morphing into Procol Harum. During the 70s, Southend was a big part for the Pub rock scene, with Paul Shuttleworth and Will Birch running a pub rock venue at The Esplanade, with other venues like The Top Alex, and influential acts like The Kursaal Flyers and Mickey Jupp. In 1989, an album The Southend Connection was released to celebrate the roots of the genre in the town. Later in the decade, Southend had a big punk rock scene producing notable bands The Machines, The Sinyx and Kronstadt Uprising. Media theorist Dick Hebdige stated that punk originated from "a whole range of heterogeneous youth styles: glitter rock, American proto-punk, London pub-rock, Southend R & B bands, Northern soul and reggae".

In the early 1990s, rock bands such as Understand and Above All had Kerrang! compare the Southend music scene to punk rock meccas New York, Los Angeles, Seattle and Washington DC. Between 2001 and 2006, the Southend scene was centered on the Junk Club, which was held in the basement of the Royal Hotel. It was run by Oliver "Blitz" Abbott & Rhys Webb of The Horrors, and the underground club night played an eclectic mix from Post Punk to Acid House, 1960s Psychedelia to Electro. The club was influential and featured nationally in the NME; Dazed & Confused; i-D; Rolling Stone; The Guardian and Vogue. Acts associated with the scene included:

- The Horrors
- These New Puritans
- The Violets
- Ipso Facto
- Neils Children
- No Bra
- Ulterior.

==== Videos and songs ====
Southend has been used as the location for several music videos, by artists such as Oasis, Morrissey and George Michael. The city is mentioned in a number of songs including Elton John's track Bitter Fingers, Picture Book by The Kinks, and in Billy Bragg's hymn to Essex, A13, Trunk Road to the sea, a British version of Route 66, where the final line of the chorus is "Southend's the end".

==== Artists and bands ====
Southend has had numerous bands and musicians that have originated from the town, including:

- Busted
- Get Cape. Wear Cape. Fly
- Danielle Dax
- Eddie and the Hot Rods
- Eight Rounds Rapid
- The Horrors
- The Kursaal Flyers
- Mickey Jupp
- Nothing But Thieves
- The Paramounts
- Procol Harum
- These New Puritans
- Tonight.
- Wilko Johnson

=== Radio ===
In 1981, Southend became the home of Essex Radio, which broadcast from studios below Clifftown Road. The station was formed by several local companies, including Keddies, Garons and TOTS nightclub, with David Keddie, owner of the Keddies department store in Southend, becoming its chairman. In 2004, the renamed Essex FM, then Heart Essex moved to studios in Chelmsford. It is now part of Heart East.

The BBC Local Radio station that broadcasts to Southend is BBC Essex.

On 28 March 2008, Southend got its own radio station for the first time, which was also shared with Chelmsford Radio. Southend Radio started broadcasting from purpose-built studios adjacent to the Adventure Island theme park. The station merged with Chelmsford Radio in 2015 and became Radio Essex.

=== Television ===
Southend is served by London and East Anglia regional variations of the BBC and ITV. Television signals are received from either Crystal Palace or Sudbury TV transmitters. The area can also pick up BBC South East and ITV Meridian from the Bluebell Hill TV transmitter.

Southend has appeared in several television shows and advertisements. It has been used on numerous occasions by the soap EastEnders with its most recent visit in 2022. Southend Pier was used by ITV show Minder for its end credits in season 8, 9 and 10, and between 2014 & 2021 was home to Jamie & Jimmy's Friday Night Feast. Advertisements have included Abbey National, CGU Pensions, National Lottery, the 2015 Vauxhall Corsa adverts featuring Electric Avenue, a seafront arcade the 2018 Guide Dogs for the Blind campaign and for the promo for David Hasselhoff's Dave programme Hoff the Record.

=== In fiction ===
Southend is the seaside holiday location chosen by the John Knightley family in Emma by Jane Austen, published 1816. The family arrived by stage coach and strongly preferred it to the choice of the Perry family, Cromer, which was 100 miles (160 km) from London, compared to the easier distance of 40 miles (64 km) from the London home of the John and Isabella Knightley, as discussed at length with Mr. Woodhouse in the novel in Chapter XII of volume one.

In The Hitchhiker's Guide to the Galaxy by Douglas Adams, after being saved from death in the vacuum of space, Arthur Dent and Ford Prefect find themselves in a distorted version of Southend (a consequence of the starship Heart of Gold's Infinite Improbability Drive). Dent briefly feared that both he and Prefect did in fact die, based on a childhood nightmare where his friends went to either Heaven or Hell but he went to Southend.

Dance on My Grave, a book by Aidan Chambers, is set in Southend. Chambers had worked as a teacher in the city's Westcliff High School for Boys for three years.

In the novel Starter for Ten by David Nicholls, the main character Brian Jackson comes from Southend-on-Sea. The book was adapted into a 2006 film directed by Tom Vaughan.

== Places of worship ==
There are churches in the borough catering to different Christian denominations, such as Our Lady Help of Christians and St Helen's Church for the Roman Catholic community. There are two synagogues; one for orthodox Jews, in Westcliff, and a reform synagogue in Chalkwell. Three mosques provide for the Muslim population; one run by the Bangladeshi community, and the others run by the Pakistani community.

There are two Hindu Temples, BAPS Shri Swaminarayan Mandir and Southend Meenatshe Suntharasar Temple, while there is one Buddhist temple, Amita Buddha Centre.

The Salvation Army has been based in Southend since 1887.

== Freedom of the City ==
Preceded by Blackburn with Darwen	LGC Council of the Year; 2012	Succeeded by
