= List of conservation areas and listed buildings in Southend-on-Sea =

As of October 2017, there are 14 listed Conservation Areas in the city of Southend-on-Sea in Essex, England. Southend-on-Sea started out as a few fishermens' huts at the South End of Prittlewell, before becoming a holiday destination during the Victorian era.

In 1968 Southend Borough Council created the first conservation area in Clifftown, the home to the first Georgian and Victorian development of the town including its first park, Prittlewell Square.

Nationally Historic England have 124 recorded listed buildings within the city, with five of these being Grade I listed. In September 2024, Historic England added two new Grade II designated landmarks, the Shrubbery, an early 19th century walkway along the cliffs at Southend, and the Sun Shelter at Westcliff-on-Sea, which is the largest curved sun shelter on the east coast of England.

== List of conservation areas ==
Name	Image	Area	Year active from	Notes	Refs
Chapmanslord		Marine Estate, Leigh-on-Sea	2004	In the 1920s Chapmanslord Housing Society developed the area as part of the Homes for Heroes campaign. The 55 properties in Canvey Road, Ray Close, Ray Walk and Marine Parade are a good example of Garden City planning and have an Arts and Crafts character. The name of Chapmanslord came from the name of the farm on the site, which had been created in the 18th century from the merger of land owned by Andrew Chapmans, Lords Land and Jeremy Slyvester.	
Clifftown		Clifftown, Southend-on-Sea	1968	Clifftown is home to the Georgian Royal Terrace, visited by Princess Caroline of Brunswick, Queen to King George IV, and the planned Victorian estate of Cliff Town. The area includes other several listed buildings including Cliff Town Congregational Church, the War Memorial and the statue of Queen Victoria. Southend's original High Street, Nelson Street is located in the conservation area.	
Crowstone		Westcliff-on-Sea	1990	The most prominent building in the conservation area is Crowstone House, built in 1905 and now a nursing home. The area is named after the North Eastern marker, the Crow Stone which marked the extent of power in history of the City of London and the Port of London Authority.	
Eastern Esplanade		Southend-on-Sea	1989	The conservation area covers a terrace of 19th century fishermans' cottages, several of which are Grade II listed.	
Leigh Cliff		Leigh-on-Sea	1981	The conservation area marks the growth of the town from a fishing village. It covers an area east of the old village and includes the locally listed building, The Grand Hotel.	
Leigh		Leigh-on-Sea	1971	The conservation area covers the area north of the original Old Leigh, rising up to the parish church of St Clement, which is Grade II* listed.	
Leigh Old Town		Leigh-on-Sea	1977	The conservation area covers the area between the railway line and Leigh Creek. The area was first recorded in the Domesday Book as Legra, a tiny fishing hamlet. Historical buildings included the pubs The Crooked Billett – listed and 16th century, The Peterboat which was a replacement building from 1892 after a fire, and the Ye Old Smack, which was rebuilt in 1855 on the opposite side of the road as the original was demolished to make way for the railway.	
Milton		Westcliff-on-Sea	1987	Milton was listed as Middletun in the Domesday Book, but most of the area was developed during the Victorian era. The Park estate in Milton is one of the earliest developments in Southend. The area has differing Victorian and Edwardian styles, and the former Wesleyan Chapel, built in 1870 was Southend's first Methodist church and part of it is nationally listed.	
Prittlewell		Prittlewell	1991	Prittlewell was one of the two principal settlements, and its South End provided the town with its name. St Mary's church was mentioned in the Domesday Book and has parts which are from the 7th century; it is Grade I listed. Another listed building is 255 Victoria Avenue, Grade II, built in the 15th century.	
Shoebury Garrison		Shoeburyness	1981	Shoebury Garrison was first designated in 1981, and further extended in 2004. The garrison was created in 1849 by the Board of Ordnance and closed as a garrison in 1976. Several of the buildings are nationally listed.	
Shorefield		Westcliff-on-Sea	1981	The area is east of the Cliffs Pavilion, and west of the Cliff town estate. Its prominent features are the Westcliff Hotel, built in 1891, and 27 Westcliff Parade, 1880.	
The Kursaal		Southend-on-Sea	1989	This is a small area incorporating The Kursaal, which is Grade II listed, and 1–6 Eastern Esplanade.	
The Leas		Westcliff-on-Sea	1981	This area facing the Thames Estuary retains many of the original buildings. Most notable are Palmeira Mansions (1901–02) and Argyle House (1937)	
Warrior Square		Southend-on-Sea	1990	The Warrior Square estate was auctioned off as plots of land in 1881, and a formal garden for the use of residents was created to encourage development. The gardens, now in public use, and the remaining north terrace are listed.	

== Notable listed buildings ==
The Royal Terrace (originally called the Terrace), built between 1791 and 1793, is one of the few examples of 18th-century urban housing in Essex, and was called "Exceptional" in the 2007 architectural guide The Buildings of England. The Terrace has been Grade II listed since 1951. In 1973, the owners of the Royal Hotel at the end of the Terrace, put in planning permission to demolish the public house and replace it, which was rejected.

Southchurch Hall is a Grade I listed Medieval moated house located in Southchurch, built between c.1321 – 1364 with later extensions. In 1930 it was restored and presented to the people of Southend by the Dowsett Family. The Hall was listed in Simon Jenkins England's Thousand Best Houses.

St Mary's Church, Prittlewell is a Grade I listed church that has existed since Saxon times and is the oldest building in the city. Professor Stephen Rippon of the University of Exeter noted in a study "stone buildings in this period were extremely rare, suggesting Prittlewell was a 'minster' church of some importance", and the church was mentioned in Domesday Book.

Southend-on-Sea War Memorial is a Grade II* listed obelisk situated in Clifftown, Southend. The structure was completed in 1921 to designs by Sir Edwin Lutyens. Architectural historian Nikolaus Pevsner praised the "remarkably subtly proportioned" base and pedestal of the memorial.

The White Hall is a Grade II listed former tennis club house in Clatterfield Gardens in the suburb of Westcliff-on-Sea. The building, along with its neighbouring house were designed by the Head of the School of Architecture at Southend Municipal College, Douglas Niel Martin-Kaye for the Thurston family. The building from 1934, is designed in the International Style and was to be part of a modernist development that failed to materialise beyond the two buildings. The building is now home to the Sunshine Nursery.

Porters is a medieval Manor house. The name comes from the family, le-Porters, who owned the land during the 14th century. The current house was built either in the 15th or 16th century made from red brick, with cross wings at the east and west ends gabled on the north and south fronts. At the end of the 16th century, it was rebuilt with the space between the wings being filled in and a porch built on the north front. The property's first recorded owner was Humfrey Browne (died 1592). Between 1833 and 1835, Benjamin Disraeli stayed at Porters on numerous occasions. In 1912, Sir Charles Nicholson purchased the building to save it from demolition, living there until 1932, when it was sold to Southend Corporation who in 1935 opened it as the Mayor's parlour and civic house. The building was listed as Grade I in 1951.

== See also ==
- Southend-on-Sea
- List of conservation areas in England
