= Lavell =

Lavell may refer to:

== People ==
- LaVell Edwards (1930–2016), American football coach
- LaVell Boyd (born 1976), American football player
- Lavell Crawford (born 1968), American comedian
- David Banner (né Lavell Crump, born 1974), American musician

== Businesses ==
- Lavells Newsagents Ltd, a former British retail chain

== Places ==
- Lavell Township, Minnesota, USA
