= List of conservation areas in England =

In early 2021, there were just under 9,800 unique Conservation Areas in England (excluding sub-sections managed by secondary Local Planning Authorities), providing heritage protection for around 2.3% of England's land area and over 10% of properties. This article was originally intended to provide a comprehensive list, arranged by ceremonial county and district / unitary authority, but the listing has remained incomplete (currently around 10% including external links) and has only been sporadically added to or maintained. The table has been retained at the foot of this article, as it provides a holding structure for a number of useful local links, but its usefulness has been largely superseded by other sources.

In mid-2017, the first comprehensive listing was published, accompanied by a range of supporting analysis, and made available as a PDF download or in spreadsheet format by the author. This has subsequently been improved on by a new national spatial dataset, containing not only the names and key attributes of all English conservation areas, but also a full boundary dataset suitable for use in spatial analysis. This is currently the best available summary of English conservation areas, but will gradually become outdated as Local Planning Authorities designate new areas or amend the spatial extent of existing areas.

There is marked variation in the use of conservation area status across England, with coverage ranging from 100% of properties in the Isles of Scilly (which is one large conservation area) through an average of 17% in London (although some boroughs have over 50% coverage) to under 5% in about 30% of local authority areas. In some areas, the listing of individual buildings plays a very prominent role in local heritage protection, but in London almost 40 times as many properties benefit from conservation area protections, and in some areas such as Blackpool, Watford, Oadby, Wigston and Eastbourne the ratio is over 50.

An official national spatial dataset for English conservation areas is maintained by Historic England, which makes copies available on request, although 4% of Local Planning Authorities are omitted and a further 20% have not currently granted permission to publish their data.

== Conservation areas ==
Ceremonial County	District / Unitary Authority	Conservation Area Name	Total Number in Ceremonial County	Notes
Bedfordshire	Borough of Bedford	25 Designated Bedford Biddenham Cardington Carlton & Chellington Elstow Farndish Felmersham Great Barford Great Barford Hill and Green End Harrold |Kempston Odell Pavenham Podington Riseley Roxton Sharnbrook Stevington Stewartby Swineshead Thurleigh Turvey Upper Dean Wootton	89 (as of June 2007)	
Bedfordshire	Luton	4 Designated Luton Town Centre Luton Plaiters Lea Luton High Town Road Luton Rothesey	89 (as of June 2007)	
Bedfordshire	Central Bedfordshire	60 Designated Ampthill Aspley Guise Aspley Heath Astwick Barton-le-Clay Biggleswade Billington Blunham Caddington Clifton Clophill Eaton Bray Eversholt Church End Flitton Harlington Haynes Church End Dunstable Eggington Heath and Reach Henlow Hockliffe Church End Houghton Regis Husborne Crawley Main Village Husborne Crawley Church End Ickwell Kensworth Church End Kensworth Lynch Leighton Buzzard Linslade Luton Hoo Maulden Meppershall Millbrook Milton Bryan Northill Old Warden Potton Pulloxhill Ridgmont Sandy Sewell Shefford Shillington Silsoe Southcott Village Southill Steppingley Streatley Sutton Studham Tebworth Tempsford Church End Tempsford Langford End Tingrith Toddington Totternhoe Whipsnade Woburn Wrestlingworth Wrest Park	89 (as of June 2007)	
Berkshire	Bracknell Forest	4 Designated Easthampstead Warfield Winkfield Row Winkfield Village	118 (as of June 2007)	
Berkshire	Reading	14 Designated Caversham Surley Row Caversham St. Peters Reading Market Place/London Street Reading Russell St/Castle Hill Reading St. Mary's Butts/Castle Street Reading Eldon Square Reading South Park Reading Downshire Square Tilehurst Routh Lane Reading The Mount Reading Horncastle Reading Redlands Reading Christchurch Reading Alexandra Road Reading Kendrick Road (Proposed)	118 (as of June 2007)	
Berkshire	Slough	4 Designated Colnbrook Slough St Bernard's School Slough St Mary's Church Slough Sussex Pl. Clifton Rd.	118 (as of June 2007)	
Berkshire	West Berkshire	52 Designated Aldermaston Aldermaston Wharf Aldworth Ashampstead Bagnor Lower Basildon Benham Park Boxford and Westbrook Bradfield Brightwalton Brightwalton Green Brimpton Bucklebury Chaddleworth Chieveley Compton Donnington Eastbury East Garston Eddington Englefield Farnborough Great Shefford Hampstead Norreys Hillgreen Hungerford East Ilsley West Ilsley Inkpen Kennet and Avon Canal East Kennet and Avon Canal West Kintbury Lambourn Upper Lambourn Marsh Benham Stroud Green Newbury Town Centre Newbury Donnington Square Newbury Shaw Road and Crescent Newbury Shaw House and Church Pangbourne Sheffield Bridge Speen Stanford Dingley Streatley Thatcham Theale High Street / Blossom Lane Theale Holy Trinity Theale The Lamb Tyle Mill Woolhampton Yattendon	118 (as of June 2007)	
Berkshire	Royal Borough of Windsor and Maidenhead	27 Designated Beenham's Heath Bisham Bray Burchetts Green Cookham Dean Cookham High Street Datchet Eton Holyport Hurley Inner Windsor Littlewick Green Maidenhead All Saints, Boyn Hill Maidenhead Altwood Road Maidenhead Boulter's Lock Maidenhead Bridge and Guard's Club Island Maidenhead Castle Hill Maidenhead Town Centre Clewer Mill Lane Old Windsor Pinkneys Green Shurlock Row Sunningdale Waltham St Lawrence White Waltham St Mary's Church & Bury Court Windsor Town Centre Windsor Trinity Place/ Clarence Crescent	118 (as of June 2007)	
Berkshire	Wokingham	16 Designated	118 (as of June 2007)	
Bristol	Bristol	30 Designated Avon Valley Bedminster Bower Ashton Brentry Brislington City and Queen Square City Docks Clifton and Hotwells College Green Cotham and Redland Gloucester Road Henbury Kingsdown Kingsweston and Trym Valley Montpelier Old Market Portland Square Park Street and Brandon Hill Redcliffe Sea Mills Shirehampton Sneyd Park Stapleton and Frome Valley St James' Parade St Michael's Hill and Christmas Steps Stokes Croft The Downs Tyndall's Park Westbury-on-Trym Whiteladies Road	30 (as of April 2018)	
Buckinghamshire	Aylesbury Vale	124 Designated Buckingham Winslow, Buckinghamshire		Aylesbury Vale District Council
Cheshire	Warrington	See List of conservation areas in Warrington		
Dorset	Bournemouth, Christchurch and Poole	See List of conservation areas in Bournemouth, Christchurch and Poole		
Essex	Southend-on-Sea	See List of conservation areas in Southend-on-Sea		
Essex	Thurrock	7 Designated Corringham East Tilbury Fobbing Horndon-on-the-Hill Orsett Purfleet West Tilbury		
East Sussex	Brighton and Hove	See List of conservation areas in Brighton and Hove		
Greater London	Merton	John Innes Conservation Area		
Greater Manchester	Manchester	34 Designated Albert Park Albert Square Ancoats Ballbrook Blackburn Park Brooklands Road Castlefield Cathedral (shared with Salford) Chorlton Green Chorltonville Crab Lane Crumpsall Green Crumpsall Lane Deansgate/Peter Street Didsbury St James George Street Gore Brook Valley Graver Lane Northenden Old Broadway Parsonage Gardens Rushford Park Shudehill Smithfield St Ann's Square St John Street St Peter's Square Stevenson Square Upper King Street Victoria Park Whalley Range Whitworth Street Wilbraham Road/Edge Lane Withington	72	
Greater Manchester	Salford	16 Designated Adelphi/Bexley Square Barton-upon-Irwell (shared with Trafford) Cathedral (shared with Manchester) Cliff Crescent Ellesmere Park Flat Iron Irlams o' th' Height Mines Rescue Station Monton Green Radcliffe Park Road Roe Green/Beesley Green St Augustine's St Mark's Worsley Old Hall Worsley Village	72	
Greater Manchester	Trafford	21 Designated Altrincham Ashley Heath Altrincham Bowdon Altrincham The Devisdale Altrincham The Downs Altrincham George Street Altrincham Goose Green Altrincham Linotype Housing Estate Altrincham Old Market Place Altrincham Sandiway Altrincham Stamford New Road Dunham Town Dunham Woodhouses Hale South Hale Station Sale Ashton upon Mersey Sale Brodgen Grove Stretford Empress Stretford Longford Urmston Barton-upon-Irwell (shared with Salford) Urmston Flixton Warburton Village	72	
Kent	Bromley	45 Designated Chislehurst Conservation Area Derwent House (Camden Park Road) 1-5 Bonchester Close, Camden Park Road (5 listings)) Hawkwood Estates (Botany Bay lane) Tongs farm. Heritage record listing: #140418 (MNA129763) Hawkwood Farmhouse. Referred to as Goodlands Cottage. Heritage record listing: 140414 (MNA129989). Coordinates: 51.4012°N 0.0703°E, listed 25 August 1954.		Bromley Conservation Areas
Lincolnshire	West Lindsey	24 Designated Welton Tealby Thorpe Tealby Springthorpe Spridlington South Carlton Bridge Street, Saxilby Nettleham Market Rasen Ingham Holton-le-Moor Hemswell Hackthorn Humberston Fitties Great Limber Glentworth Glentham Gainsborough town centre Gainsborough riverside Britannia Works, Gainsborough Fillingham East Stockwith Caistor Burton Brattleby		
Lincolnshire	City of Lincoln	11 Designated Cathedral and City Centre St Peter-at-Gowts Lindum and Arboretum St Catherine's Gowts Bridge West Parade and Brayford Sibthorp Street Carline Road Newport and Nettleham Road Wragby Road, the Dell Swanpool		
Merseyside	Liverpool	35 Designated Albert Dock Canning Street Castle Street Childwall Abbey Derwent Square Duke Street Edge Hill Fulwood Park Gateacre Village Grassendale and Cressington Park Grove Park Hartley Village Hunts Cross Avenue Kensington Fields Knotty Ash Lark Lane Mossley Hill Mount Pleasant Muirhead Avenue Newenham Crescent Newsham Park Ogden Close Princes Park Princes Road Rodney Street Sefton Park Shaw Street St Michaels Hamlet Stanley Dock Toxteth Park & Avenues Walton-on-the-Hill Wavertree Garden Suburb Wavertree Village West Derby Village William Brown Street Woolton Village		
Merseyside	Wirral	Port Sunlight		
North Yorkshire	Yorkshire Dales National Park	37 Designated Appletreewick (in 2 parts) Arncliffe Askrigg Bainbridge Bolton Abbey Buckden Burnsall Carperby Castle Bolton Clapham (part of) Dent Eastby East Witton Embsay Gayle Grassington Hubberholme Kettlewell Linton Gunnerside Hebden Hudswell (part of) Ingleton (part of) Langcliffe (part of) Langcliffe Quarry Littondale Long Preston Muker Reeth Sedbergh (plus extension) Sedbergh, Farfield Mill Settle (part of) Settle-Carlisle Starbotton Swaledale & Arkengarthdale Thwaite West Burton		
Somerset	South Somerset District Council	88 Designated Alvington Ansford Barrington Blackford Bower Hinton Bruton Buckland St Mary Cadbury Castle Castle Cary Castle Cary - Higher Flax Mills Chaffcombe Chard Charlton Adam Charlton Horethorne Chiselborough Coat Combe St Nicholas Compton Pauncefoot Corton Denham Crewkerne Cricket Malherbie Donyatt Dowlish Wake Drayton East Coker East Lambrook Hadspen Haselbury Plucknett Henstridge High Ham Higher Wambrook Hinton St George Holton Horsington Huish Episcopi ILCHESTER ILMINSTER ISLE ABBOTTS KINGSBURY KINGSDON KINGWESTON KNOLE LANGPORT LIMINGTON LONG SUTTON LOPEN MACKRELL MAPERTON MARSTON MAGNA MARTOCK MERRIOTT MIDDLE CHINNOCK MILBORNE PORT MILBORNE WICK MISTERTON MONTACUTE MUCHELNEY NORTH CADBURY NORTH CHERITON NORTH COKER NORTH PERROTT NORTON-SUB-HAMDON ODCOMBE PITCOMBE PUCKINGTON QUEEN CAMEL SHEPTON BEAUCHAMP SOMERTON SOUTH CADBURY SOUTH CHERITON SOUTH PETHERTON STOFORD STOKE-SUB-HAMDON TATWORTH THORN COFFIN TINTINHULL WADEFORD WEST CHARLTON & CHARLTON WEST CAMEL WEST CHINNOCK WEST COKER WHITESTAUNTON WINCANTON WINSHAM WOOLSTON YEOVIL HENDFORD HILL YEOVIL THE PARK YEOVIL Town centre		
Warwickshire	Rugby	19 Designated Bilton Bilton Road Brandon Brinklow Churchover Clifton Road, Hillmorton Road & Whitehall Road Clifton-upon-Dunsmore Coombe Abbey Dunchurch Easenhall Hillmorton locks Leamington Hastings Monks Kirby Old Brownsover Rugby School Rugby Town Centre Stretton-on-Dunsmore Thurlaston Wolston		
West Midlands		See List of conservation areas in the West Midlands	137	
West Sussex	Crawley	See List of conservation areas in Crawley		
West Yorkshire	Bradford	58 Designated Addingham Baildon Baildon Station Road Ben Rhydding Bingley Bradford Apsley Crescent Bradford Cathedral Precinct Bradford City Centre Bradford Eldon Place Bradford Goitside Bradford Great Horton Bradford Heaton Estates Bradford Hodgson Fold Bradford Little Germany Bradford Little Horton Green Bradford Little Horton Lane Bradford Little London Bradford North Park Road Bradford Southfield Square Bradford St Paul's Bradford Undercliffe Cemetery Bradford Whetley Grove Braithwaite Brunthwaite Burley-in-Wharefdale Clayton Cullingworth Devonshire Park East Morton Esholt Hainworth Haworth Idle Idle The Green Ilkley Keighley Town Centre Laycock Leeds & Liverpool Canal Leeming Low Utley Lower Wyke Menston Micklethwaite Middleton Oakworth Oxenhope Lower Town Oxenhope Station Road Oxenhope Upper Town Queensbury Ryecroft Saltaire Silsden Stanbury Steeton Thornton Tong Wilsden Wrose	279	
West Yorkshire	Calderdale	27 Designated	279	
West Yorkshire	Kirklees	60 Designated	279	
West Yorkshire	Leeds	75 Designated	279	
West Yorkshire	Wakefield	29 Designated	279	
