= Museum of Chelmsford =

Museum in Chelmsford, Essex

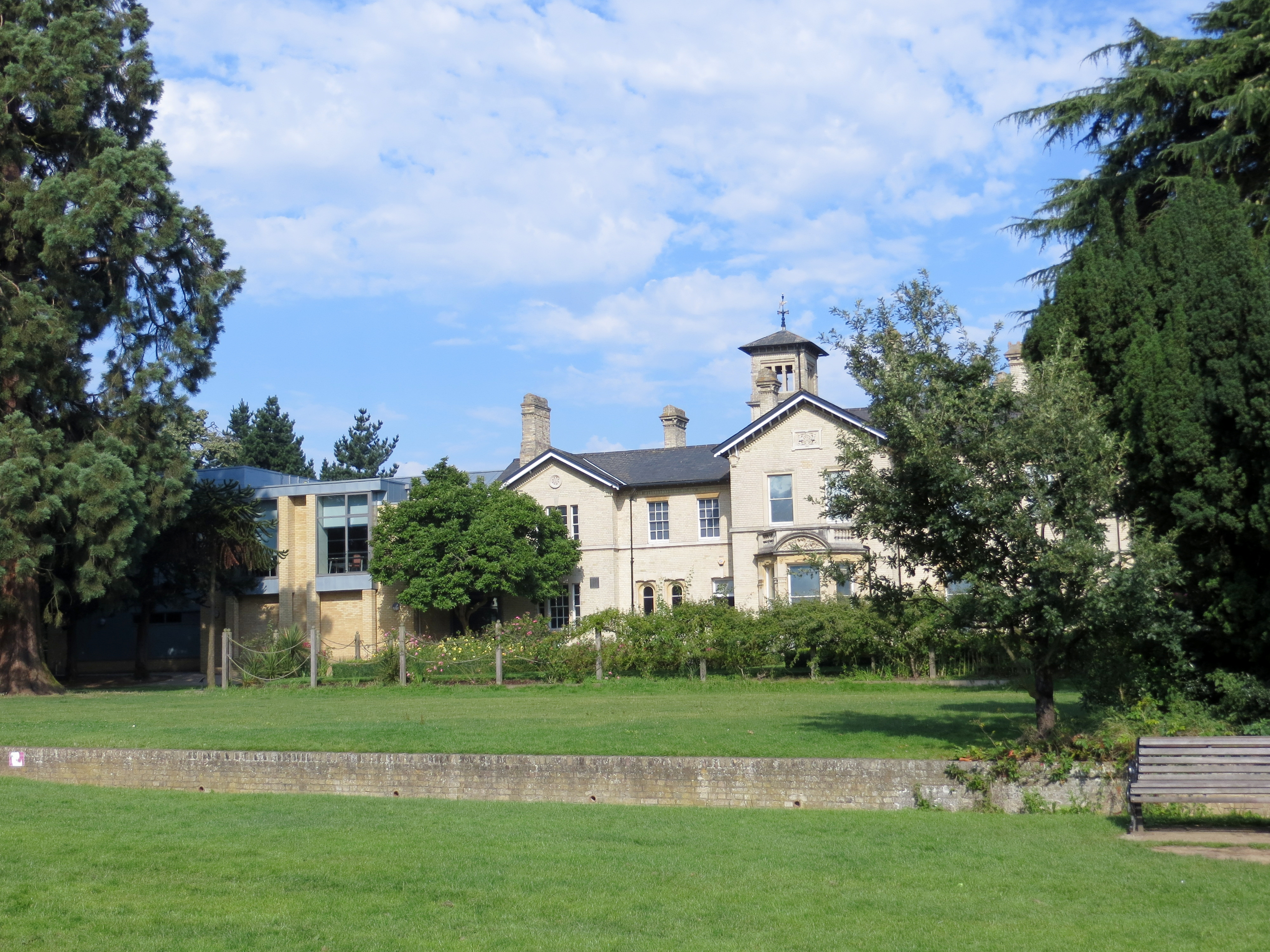
- Oaklands House

- Shown in Essex
- Established: 1930
- Location: Oaklands House, Chelmsford,
- Coordinates: 51.72262°N 0.46388°E
- Type: Local history and industrial heritage
- Website: www.chelmsford.gov.uk/museums

The Museum of Chelmsford is based in Oaklands House, an historic property off Moulsham Street in Chelmsford, Essex. It is a Grade II Listed building.

== Oaklands House ==
The house was designed by Charles Pertwee for Frederick Wells, a director of the Chelmsford Brewery, and completed by 1865. It was constructed with an elaborate campanile, and went on to be used as a hospital during the First World War. Since 1930 the building has housed the Museum of Chelmsford.

== Collections ==
The Museum of Chelmsford is a local history and industrial heritage museum. A major £5 million extension and redevelopment scheme opened in January 2010 and the museum now includes exhibits and interactive displays focusing on the engineering pioneers R.E.B. Crompton, Guglielmo Marconi, and Hoffmann Ball Bearings, as well as illustrating the development of the town and city from prehistory up to modern times. The fine art collection includes works by noted artists with a connection to Chelmsford, including Alfred Bennett Bamford, Doris Boulton-Maude and Richard Spare. It also holds pottery including Castle Hedingham ware and that made by the Turner Prize winner Grayson Perry.

The house also incorporates the Museum of the Essex Regiment and the Essex Yeomanry. Highlights of this collection include the French Imperial Eagle captured by the 2nd Battalion of the 44th Regiment of Foot from the French 62nd Régiment d'Infanterie de Ligne at the Battle of Salamanca in 1812, as well as The Last Stand of the 44th Regiment at Gundamuck, a painting by William Barnes Wollen depicting the 1842 retreat from Kabul in Afghanistan. In October 2025, it was announced that the Essex Regiment collection would be moved from the museum and merged with the Royal Anglian Regiment collection at IWM Duxford.
