= List of conservation areas in Warrington =

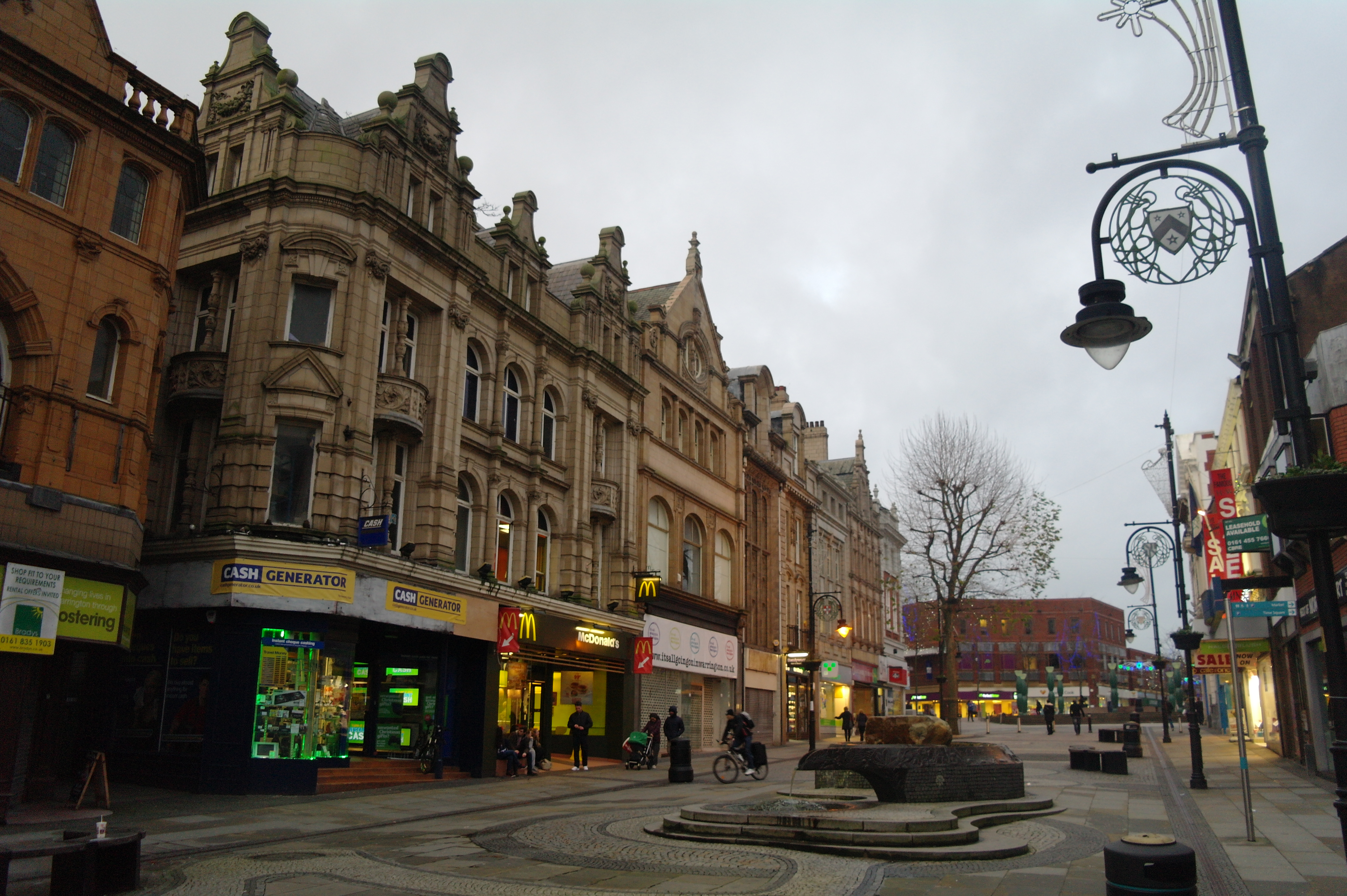
The Bridge Street Conservation Area includes many late Victorian shop buildings such as these which are a particularly noteworthy example of faience cladding.

As of February 2016, there are 16 Conservation Areas in the borough of Warrington in Cheshire, England. The origins of Warrington are as a mediaeval market town and crossing point of the River Mersey, it grew rapidly during Industrial Revolution on the back of industries such as brewing, tanning and especially wire manufacturing. Further expansion followed the Second World War when it was selected as a New Town. The population is now over 200,000. Since 1971 several Conservation Areas have been designated in Warrington in recognition of their special architectural and historical interest.

== Conservation areas ==
Name	Image	Area	Year	Notes	Refs
Bewsey Street		Warrington Town Centre	1976	This area contains the longest existing row of Georgian town houses in Warrington as well as some later additions such as the former Liberal Club, shown to the left.	
Bridge Street		Warrington Town Centre	1980 (extended 1995 and 1996)	Based around one of the main thoroughfares of Warrington, linking the town centre to Warrington Bridge across the River Mersey, this Conservation Area also includes the Garnett Cabinet Works to the west. The italianate water tower from this factory complex is shown to the left.	
Buttermarket Street		Warrington Town Centre	1972		
Church Street		Warrington Town Centre	1983		
Culcheth (Newchurch)		Culcheth	1993		
Grappenhall (Victoria Road/York Drive) & Stockton Heath (Ackers Road/Marlborough Crescent)		Grappenhall Stockton Heath	1996		
Grappenhall Village		Grappenhall	1974 (extended 1980)		
Greenalls Brewery		Wilderspool Causeway	2001		
Lymm		Lymm			
Palmyra Square		Warrington Town Centre	1974 (extended 1985 and 1995)		
Stockton Heath		Stockton Heath	1988		
Thelwall Village		Thelwall	1977(extended 1991 and 1993)		
Town Hall		Warrington Town Centre	1972		
Walton Village		Walton, Cheshire	1977		
Winwick Street		Warrington Town Centre	1999	This Conservation Area includes part of Warrington Central Station and a former Cheshire Lines Committee goods warehouse which has been converted to apartments.	

== See also ==
- List of conservation areas in England
- Listed buildings in Warrington (unparished area)
