= Prittlewell Priory =

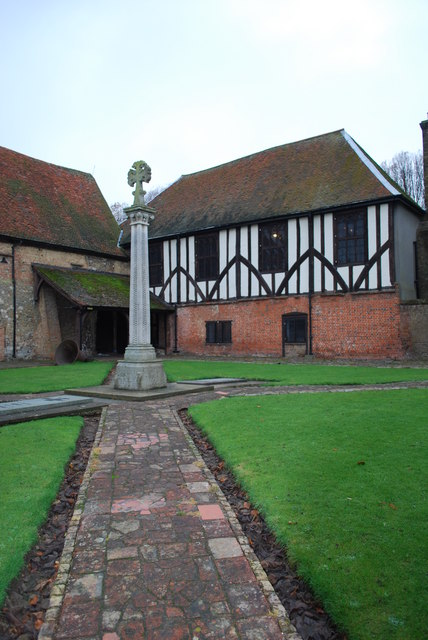
- Prittlewell Priory in 2008 – cloister area and claustral buildings
- Interactive map of the Prittlewell Priory area

General information
- Status: Preserved
- Type: Priory
- Location: Prittlewell, Southend-on-Sea, England
- Coordinates: 51.553°N 0.705°E
- Construction started: c.1110 AD

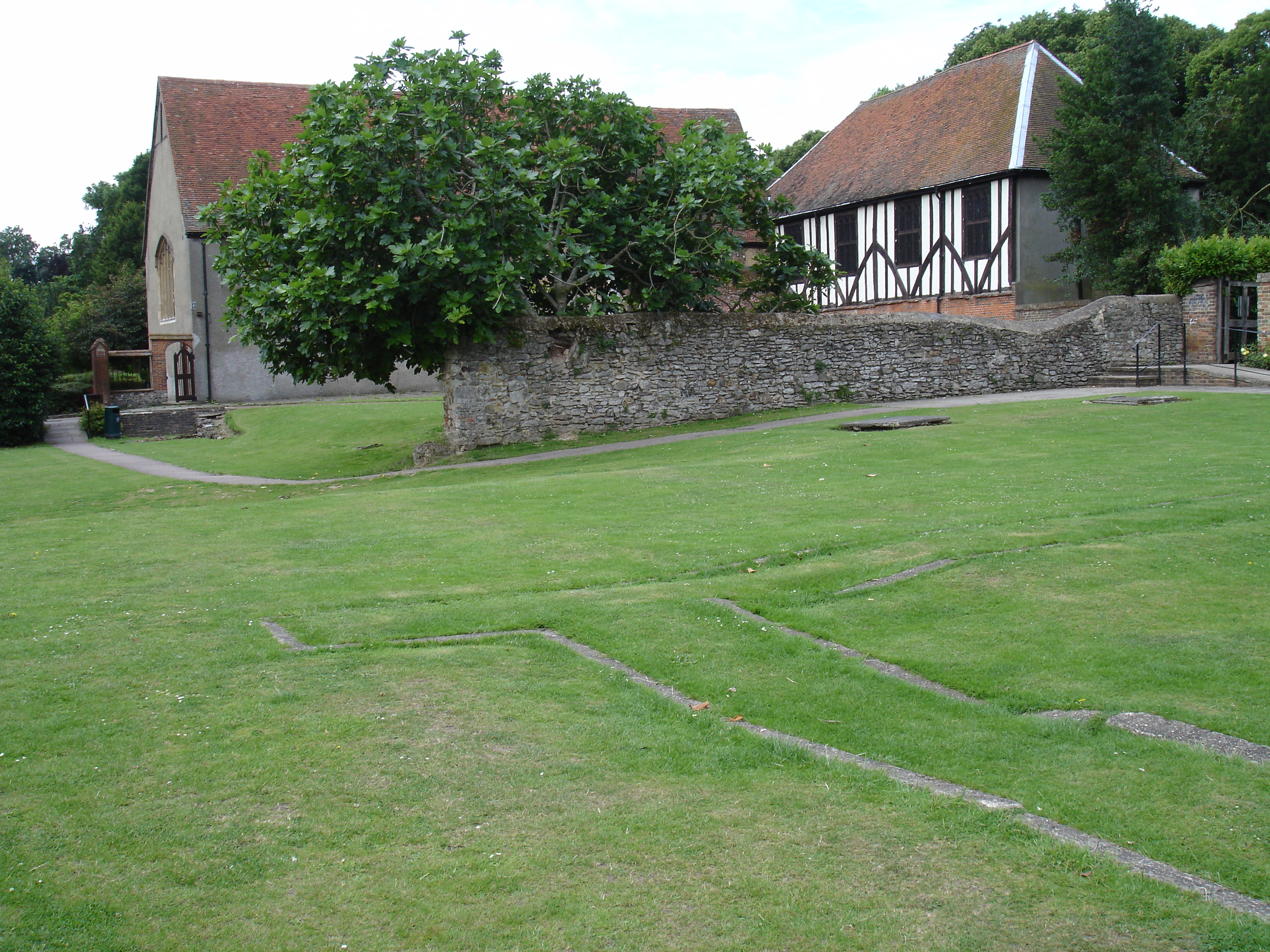
The remains of Prittlewell Priory in Essex, showing the marked layout of the priory church in the foreground and claustral buildings in the background

Prittlewell Priory is a medieval priory in the Prittlewell area of Southend, Essex, England. It was founded in the 12th century, by monks from the Cluniac Priory of St Pancras in Lewes, East Sussex, and passed into private hands at the time of the dissolution of the monasteries under Henry VIII. Southend jeweller and philanthropist R. A. Jones, purchased the Priory from the Scratton family and donated the priory and the grounds to the local council to form a public park. The grounds were opened as a public park, Priory Park, and the Grade I listed building is open to the public as a museum, the first museum opened in Southend. The remains of the priory are a scheduled monument.

== History ==
Prittlewell Priory was founded by the Cluniac Order as a cell to the Priory of St Pancras at Lewes, East Sussex. Prittlewell was one of the lesser monasteries, housing not more than 18 monks. In 1536 much of the building was destroyed, and what remained was much altered during the 18th century. Alterations were made again in the early 20th century, when the refectory was restored and partly rebuilt. A number of original features do survive, including a 12th-century doorway with chevron and dog-tooth ornamentation.

After the Dissolution the priory was a private residence. According to William White, in his 1848 Directory of Essex, on the Dissolution "...[the Priory's] revenues were valued at £194.14s.3d. per annum, and it was granted to Lord Chancellor Thomas Audley, who conveyed it to Robert, son of Lord Rich. It afterwards passed with the manor to various families". The last family to live there, the 19th-century Scrattons, are explored in an exhibition inside the house. In 1917 the building was purchased by Robert Jones, and in May 1922 it opened as Southend's first museum.

In 2011 works began on refurbishing the existing buildings and the construction of a new Visitor Centre. The £2 million works were in part funded by the Heritage Lottery Fund and the Cory Environmental Trust in Southend-on-Sea, and were undertaken by The Facility Architects and Ibex Interiors. Works were completed in the summer of 2012 and the Priory re-opened in the June of that year. The new Visitor Centre, adjacent to the Priory, opened in February 2013.

== Conflict with Lewes Priory ==
Lewes, holding dominion over the monastery at Prittlewell, was responsible for electing the prior who would rule there. In 1311, this post was granted to William le Auvergnat. Two years into his rule, however, he was accused of corruption, and the prior of Lewes attempted to remove him.

This led to a prolonged conflict between the two priories, with Lewes promoting the ascension of James de Cusancia, and William steadfastly opposing his displacement.

Due to this unrest, the prior of Prittlewell was summoned before the King in 1318. During this audience, William outwardly resigned his position, only to return to the monastery and forcibly occupy it with his supporters.

In 1321, the monks of Lewes armed themselves and launched a counterattack, invading the priory as Mass was being said. Captives were seized and spirited away to face punishment, and William himself was struck a fatal blow at the altar, his death finally allowing James de Cusancia to succeed him as prior of Prittlewell.

== The Scratton Family ==
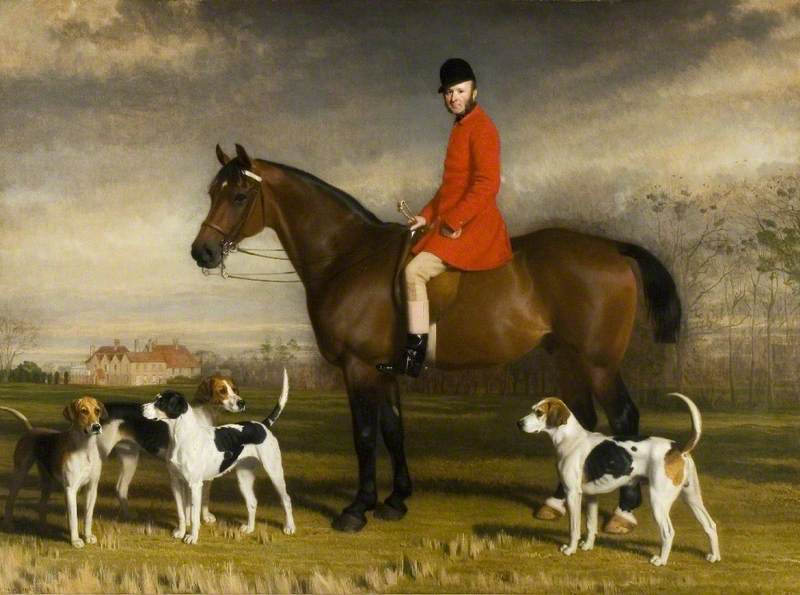
1867 portrait of Daniel Robert Scratton (1819–1902) by Stephen Pearce (1819–1904), in Southend Museum. Prittlewell Priory can be seen in the background.

In 1842 Daniel Robert Scratton (1819–1902) inherited the Priory. Together with his wife, Maria (d.1901), he renovated the buildings to provide a comfortable home. His portrait by Stephen Pearce (1819–1904), showing him mounted on a hunter, is in the collection of Southend Museum. In 1869 he moved to West Ogwell manor house in Devon, where he died in 1902. It was only when William Howell Scratton purchased the Priory in 1887 that it truly became a family home. The family created a walled kitchen garden, which originally had hot houses and a melon pit. This was on the site of the monks' burial ground. Today, it is an ornamental garden.

== The Collections ==
The Victorian extension of the Priory, which once housed the bedrooms, now hosts an interactive display on the local wildlife.

Other collections at the Priory include Daniel Robert Scratton of Prittlewell Priory, Essex by Stephen Pearce (1867) and Mrs Scratton of Prittlewell Priory by an unknown artist.

== Priory Park ==
When R A Jones purchased the Priory, he also purchased a large tract of the surrounding land, which he donated to the town for the creation of Priory Park. The Park was formally opened on 14 July 1920 by the Duke of York, who was later to become King George VI. R. A. Jones died in 1925 and he was buried in the grounds of the priory.

== Additional photographs ==
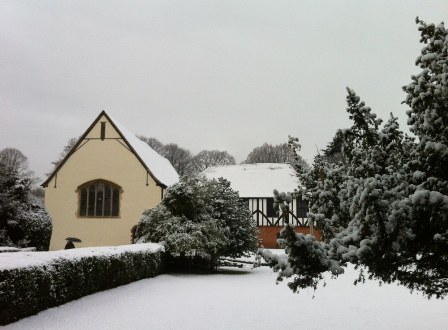
Prittlewell Priory, Southend-on-Sea, in the snow

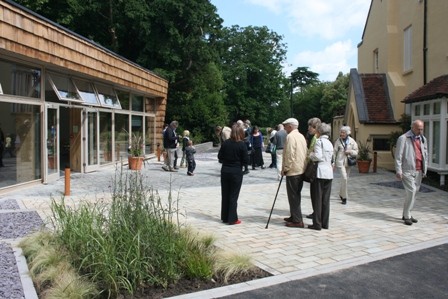
The opening of Prittlewell Priory in 2012, following refurbishment and construction of a new Visitor Centre (left of photograph)

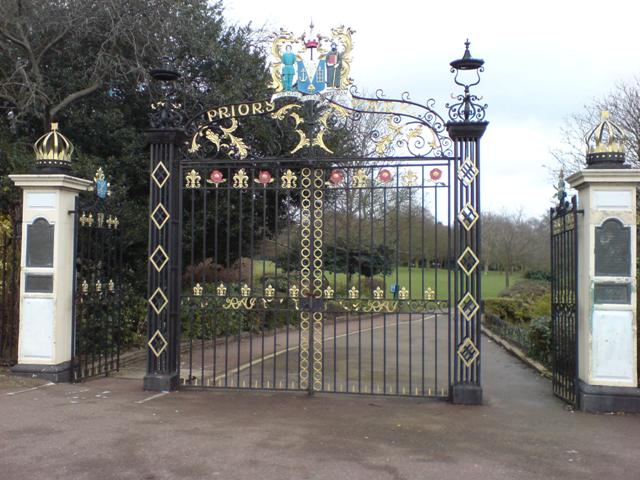
Gates to Priory Park, Prittlewell, Southend-on-Sea. The plaques on the gateposts commemorate the presentation of the park to the people of Southend, as a gift from local jeweller and benefactor R A Jones.

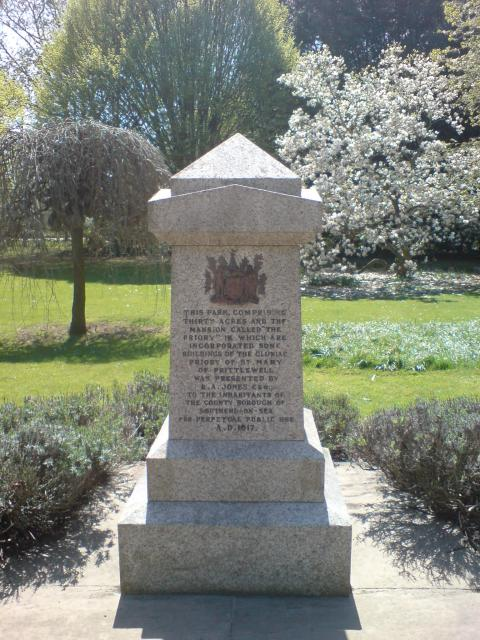
The memorial stone outside Prittlewell Priory, Southend-on-Sea, commemorating donation of the priory and surrounding park by local benefactor R A Jones in 1917.

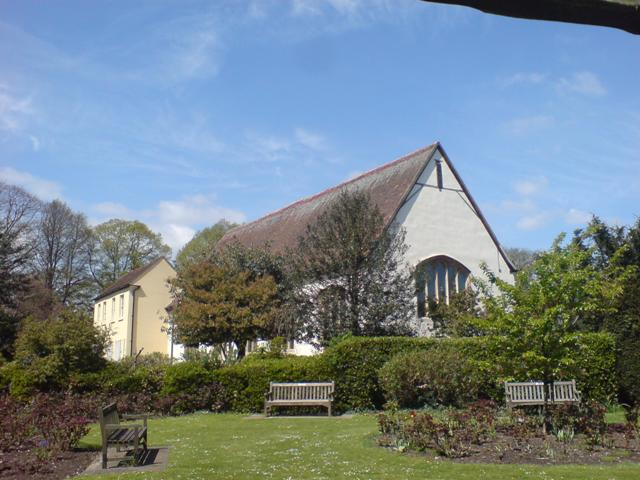
A view of Prittlewell Priory, Southend-on-Sea, from an adjacent garden in the surrounding Prittlewell Park.
