= Prittlewell Square =

Park in Southend-on-Sea, England

Coordinates: 51.5348°N 0.7082°E

Prittlewell Square is a park situated in Southend-on-Sea, Essex, England overlooking the Thames Estuary. It is the oldest park in Southend-on-Sea.

The clock at the entrance to the Square was donated by local jeweller and philanthropist R A Jones. The Square lies within the Clifftown Conservation Area, which was designated in 1968 due to the historic and architectural significance of the area.

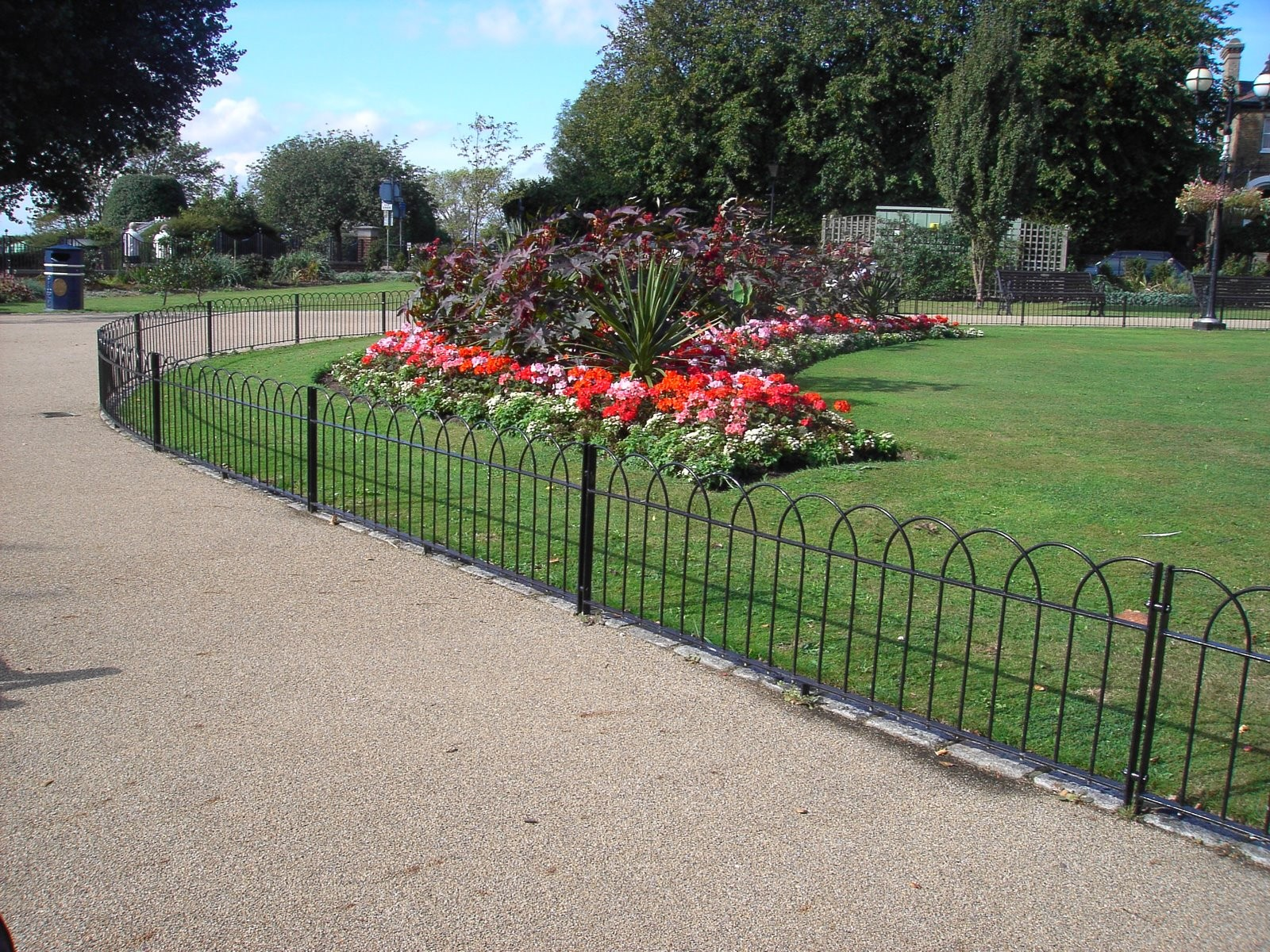
View across Prittlewell Square garden

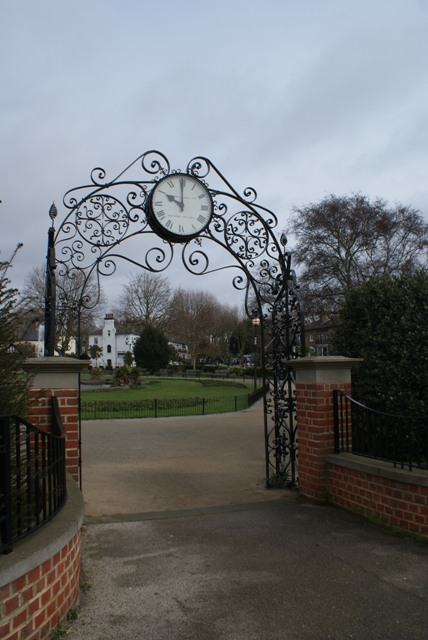
Clock donated by R A Jones

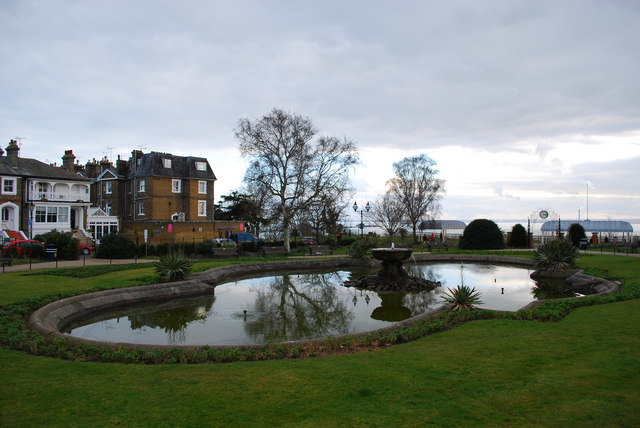
Prittlewell Square pond

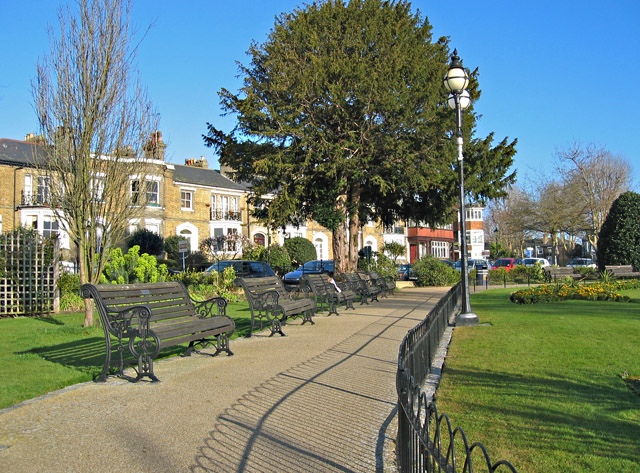
