= Prittlewell =

Area of Southend-on-Sea, in Essex, England

Coordinates: 51.548°N 0.705°E

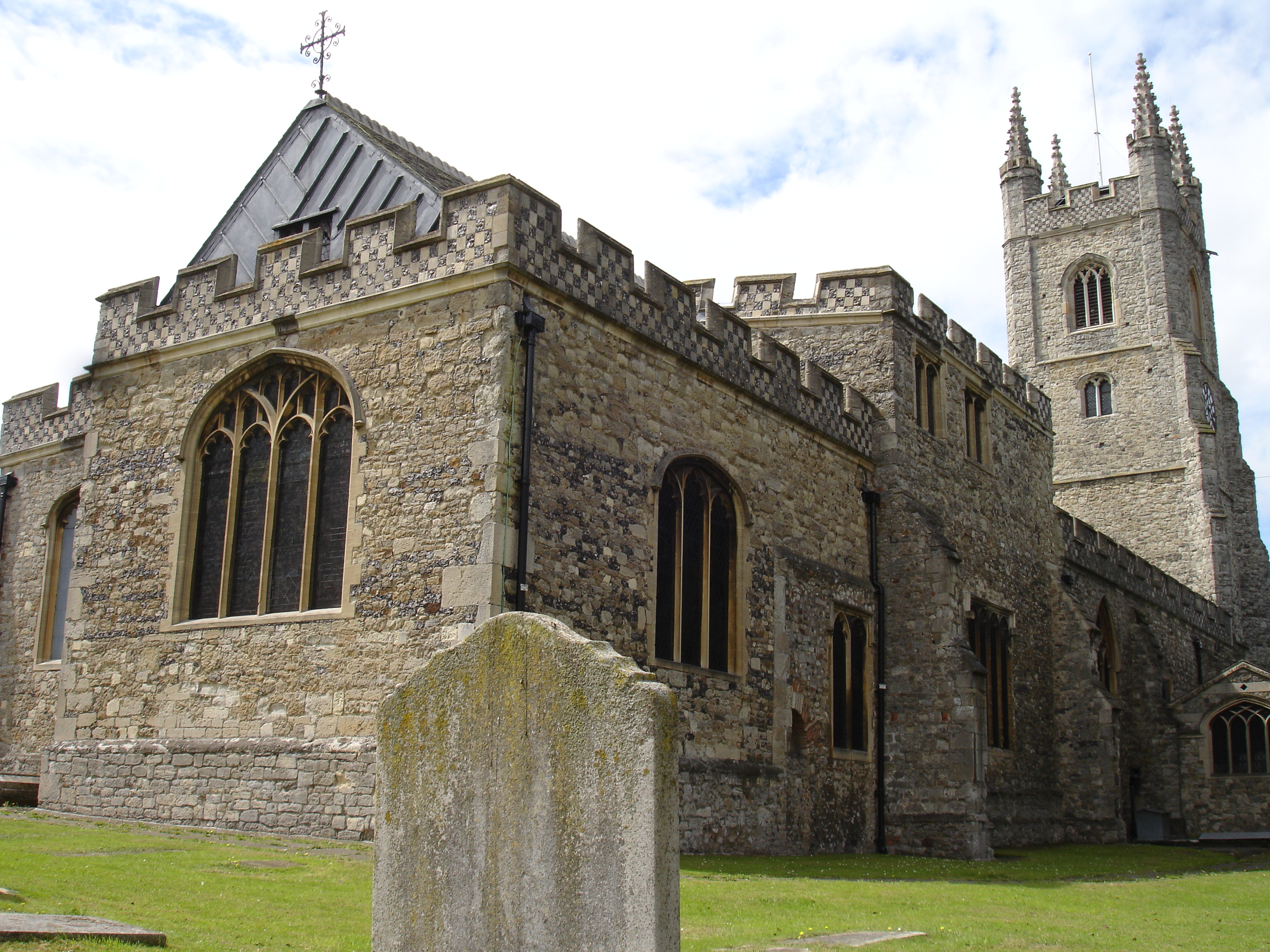
- St Mary's parish church

- Location within Essex
- Population: 9,971 (2011 Census, ward)
- OS grid reference: TQ876867
- Unitary authority: Southend-on-Sea
- Ceremonial county: Essex
- Region: East
- Country: England
- Sovereign state: United Kingdom
- Post town: SOUTHEND-ON-SEA
- Postcode district: SS2
- Dialling code: 01702
- Police: Essex
- Fire: Essex
- Ambulance: East of England
- UK Parliament: Southend West and Leigh

Prittlewell is an inner-city area in Southend-on-Sea, in Essex, England. Historically, it was the main village in the area; Southend was originally a hamlet at the southern end of the parish of Prittlewell. The village was originally centred at the joining of three main roads: East Street, West Street and North Street; it was extended south in the 19th century and renamed Victoria Avenue. As Southend grew into a seaside resort, it overtook Prittlewell in size; the village then became part of Southend's built-up area. It has been administered as part of Southend since 1877; the principal administrative buildings in Southend are located along Victoria Avenue.

== Toponymy ==
The name Prittlewell means "babbling stream". It comes from the Old English pritol meaning prattling or babbling and the well is from the Anglian dialect of Old English, meaning a stream or spring. The village grew up in the valley of the Prittle Brook, a tributary of the river Roach.

== History ==
=== Roman ===
The Roman occupation began to influence the area with the construction of a Roman-style dwelling, probably a farmhouse or villa, close to the brook in what is now Priory Park. The introduction of new ideas, new skills and social structures under this Roman influence would have brought significant change to the area. The discovery of Roman burial sites during road and rail construction in the 1920s and 1930s indicated that the settlement was well developed and of some significance, although no prominent buildings were preserved.

=== Saxons and Vikings ===
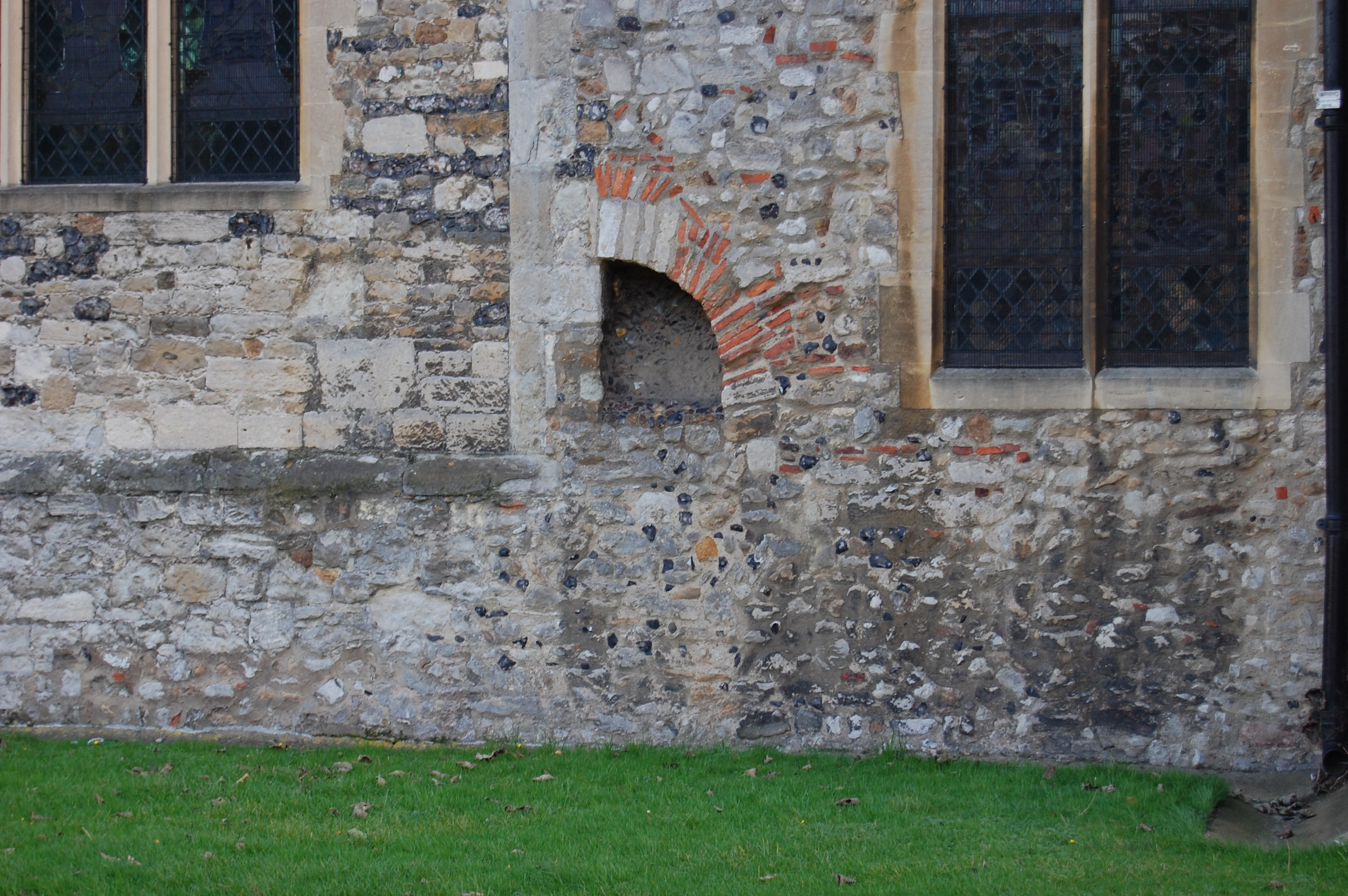
Remains of Saxon archway in the wall of St Mary's church

Following the decline of Roman Britain, the area came under the influence of Saxon raiders, over time becoming established as part of the kingdom of the East Saxons. Part of a blocked archway built of Roman tiles survives in the north wall of the chancel of St Mary's church; it has long been assumed that it represents part of a small Anglo-Saxon chapel, built in the seventh century, possibly as early as the reign of King Sæberht of Essex.

However, more recent study and comparison with surviving architectural remains elsewhere suggest instead that the arch may date as late as the tenth or early 11th century, and that this is the date of the first church to be built on the site.

==== Royal Saxon tomb ====
The construction works of 1923 and 1930 that revealed Roman burials also unearthed evidence of numerous Anglo-Saxon burials, a significant number of which were high-status or warrior burials containing weapons, imported goods, jewellery and decorative beads, some of which were made out of glass. The high status of the area during the Anglo-Saxon period was confirmed by the discovery of a substantial and undisturbed seventh-century chamber tomb in 2003. The burial site was uncovered by archaeologists from Museum of London Archaeology, who had been commissioned to prepare the site in advance of a road widening scheme.

In 2009, following local opposition, the scheme was dropped and the traffic congestion eased by works to a different road location.

The unusually rich contents and their condition have excited archaeologists, being described as "unique" by the Museum of London. (Note: A fuller description of the excavation and the artefacts of the burial chamber, originally thought to be of Sæberht of Essex, can be seen at the dedicated Museum of London website.) The story of the excavation was thought significant enough to be the subject of a special documentary titled "King of Bling", as part of the Time Team series.

=== Medieval ===
The Domesday Book of 1086 recorded two manors in the area: Prittewella and Mildenaina (Milton), the former owned by Swein of Essex and the latter by the Priory of Holy Trinity, Canterbury (now Canterbury Cathedral).

In the 12th century, Robert de Essex, also known as Robert FitzSwein, founded Prittlewell Priory as a cell of the Cluniac Priory of St Pancras, Lewes. The foundation charter included the manor and church of Prittlewell.

Prittlewell became a parish, covering the two manors of Prittlewell and Milton. There is some evidence that the parish may have originally been larger, with the churches at Eastwood, Sutton and South Shoebury all known to have once been chapels of ease to Prittlewell.

The parish and the lands of the priory extended south from the Prittlewell village to the seafront. Due to this, when a fishing settlement was set up 2 miles (3.2 km) south of the priory in the 14th century, it was still regarded as part of Prittlewell and as such was named Stratende, Sowthende or South-End. From this settlement, the modern town of Southend-on-Sea grew. Over a period of around 200 years, Prittlewell's parish church, dedicated to St Mary, was substantially enlarged, reaching its present size with the addition of its tower in the mid-15th century. At the time of the Tudor Dissolution of the Monasteries by Henry VIII, the priory, which had by this time developed into a sprawling complex, was closed and the lands seized by the crown.

=== 19th century ===
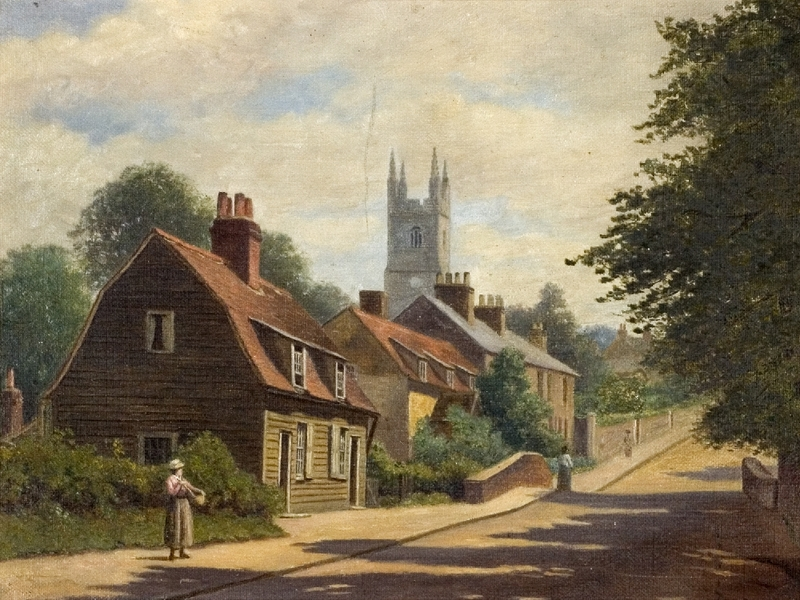
Prittlewell by Alfred Bennett Bamford

Southend was developed as a bathing resort in the 18th century and, by the 19th, Prittlewell was regarded by visitors to Southend as "an attractive village in the hinterland". In 1848, Prittlewell was described in the White's Directory of Essex as "a neat and well built village with many modern houses overlooking the estuary of the Thames, 1½ miles North West of Southend, and 3 miles South of Rochford."

Links between Prittlewell and Southend were improved in 1889 when a road, named Victoria Avenue, was built between the village crossroads by the church to Southend. In 1892, Prittlewell railway station was built by the Great Eastern Railway, linking Southend and London; the year also saw the foundation of the Municipal Borough of Southend-on-Sea, which took over responsibility for Prittlewell from an earlier local board.

=== 20th century ===
The old priory, which had been in ownership of the Scratton family, was bought by local jeweller and benefactor R. A. Jones and was given to the people of Southend as Priory Park. In 1901, Eric Kingham Cole was born in Prittlewell and went on to form EKCO, a radio, TV and plastic manufacturer, in 1924. In 1930, he built a large factory opposite Priory Park but, by 1966, the electrical side of the factory was closed (except for the car radio repair department, which closed in 1977).

The Access credit card business moved into the factory in 1972 but, with the business changing in the 1990s, Royal Bank of Scotland moved out, leaving the EKCO (now Linpac) plastic factory the only operative on the site. This closed down in 2007 and the whole site was demolished in 2012, with a combined housing and commercial development, and a new Havens Hospice being given planning permission on 14 January 2015.

=== Administrative history ===
Prittlewell was an ancient parish in the Rochford Hundred of Essex. A local government district called Southend was created in 1866, covering the southern part of the parish; this was then administered by an elected local board. In 1877, the Southend district was enlarged to cover the whole parish of Prittlewell. In 1892, the local government district was incorporated to become a municipal borough and was renamed Southend-on-Sea rather than just Southend.

Prittlewell continued to exist as a civil parish; it was coterminous with the borough of Southend-on-Sea from 1892 until 1897, when the neighbouring parish of Southchurch was absorbed into the borough. The borough then covered the two civil parishes of Prittlewell and Southchurch. Parishes within a borough were classed as urban parishes, which were ineligible to have a parish council when those were established in 1894; the lowest elected tier of local government was at the borough level.

The borough was further enlarged in 1913 to take in Leigh-on-Sea and part of Eastwood parish; at which point, the urban parishes within the borough were united into a single parish called Southend-on-Sea, matching the enlarged borough.

At the 1911 census, the last before the abolition of the civil parish, Prittlewell had a population of 58,759.

== Demography ==
Prittlewell compared
2001 UK Census	Prittlewell ward	Southend-on-Sea UA	England
Population	9,478	160,257	49,138,831
Foreign born	6.1%	6.0%	9.2%
White	95.1%	95.8%	90.9%
Asian	2.8%	2.2%	4.6%
Black	0.5%	0.7%	2.3%
Christian	71.2%	68.7%	71.7%
Muslim	1.7%	1.2%	3.1%
Hindu	1.2%	0.6%	1.1%
No religion	16.2%	18.8%	14.6%
Unemployed	3.3%	3.7%	3.3%
Retired	16.5%	14.8%	13.5%

At the 2001 UK census, the Prittlewell electoral ward had a population of 9,478. The ethnicity was 95.1% white, 1% mixed race, 2.8% Asian, 0.5% black and 0.6% other. The place of birth of residents was 93.9% United Kingdom, 0.8% Republic of Ireland, 1.2% other Western European countries and 4.1% elsewhere.

Religion was recorded as 71.2% Christian, 0.3% Buddhist, 1.2% Hindu, 0% Sikh, 1.1% Jewish and 1.7% Muslim; 16.2% were recorded as having no religion, 0.3% had an alternative religion and 8.0% did not state their religion.

The economic activity of residents aged 16–74 was 39.5% in full-time employment, 12.6% in part-time employment, 9.6% self-employed, 3.3% unemployed, 2.3% students with jobs, 2.9% students without jobs, 16.5% retired, 6.3% looking after home or family, 4.5% permanently sick or disabled and 2.6% economically inactive for other reasons. The industry of employment of residents was 15.8% retail, 11% manufacturing, 8.1% construction, 11.6% real estate, 12.9% health and social work, 7% education, 6.2% transport and communications, 6.7% public administration, 2.8% hotels and restaurants, 11.7% finance, 0.7% agriculture and 5.5% other.

Compared with national figures, the ward had a relatively high proportion of workers in finance and health and social work. Of the ward's residents aged 16–74, 14.4% had a higher education qualification or the equivalent, compared with 19.9% nationwide. According to Office for National Statistics estimates, during the period of April 2004 to March 2005, the average gross weekly income of households was £590, compared with an average of £650 in South East England.

== Landmarks ==
Only a small proportion of the historical village of Prittlewell remains standing:

- The ruins and standing remains of the Priory, visible in Priory Park
- St. Mary's Church
- A building recently restored following fire damage, though more recently a bakery and now an estate agent appropriately named Tudor Estates
- A number of public houses, the most famous of which is the Blue Boar. This is famous as being where Southend United F.C. were formed; however, the building that currently stands there is of Victorian construction, as the original building was destroyed by fire. A weekly market has also taken place here since the 1960s on Thursdays.

== Transport ==
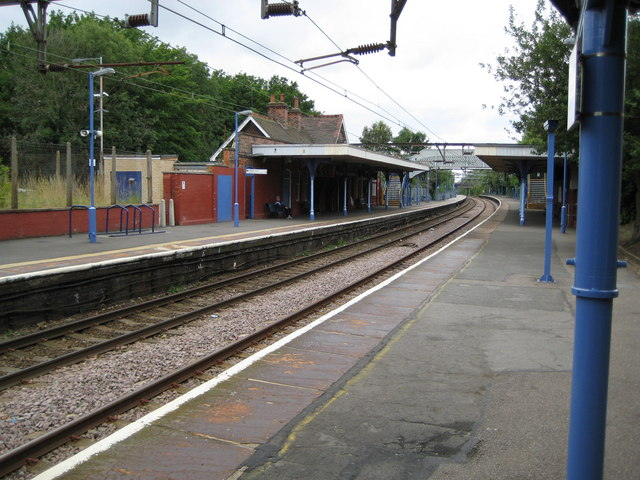
The station in 2008

The area is served by Prittlewell railway station on the Shenfield–Southend line. Greater Anglia operates regular services between Southend Victoria, Southend Airport, Rayleigh, Shenfield and London Liverpool Street.

First Essex and Arriva Southend operate local bus services, which connect the area with Southend city centre, Rayleigh, Basildon, Wickford and Chelmsford.

== Sport ==
Since 1955, Prittlewell has been the home to Southend United F.C. at their ground Roots Hall. The team is planning to move from this location and Sainsbury's currently has planning permission to build a supermarket on the site of Roots Hall, St Mary's flats, the former Eastern National bus depot/former Prospects College, and the shops on the corner of Victoria Avenue and Fairfax Drive.

Prittlewell is also home to two local football teams: Ekco Whitecaps and Prittlewell Badgers.

== Gallery ==
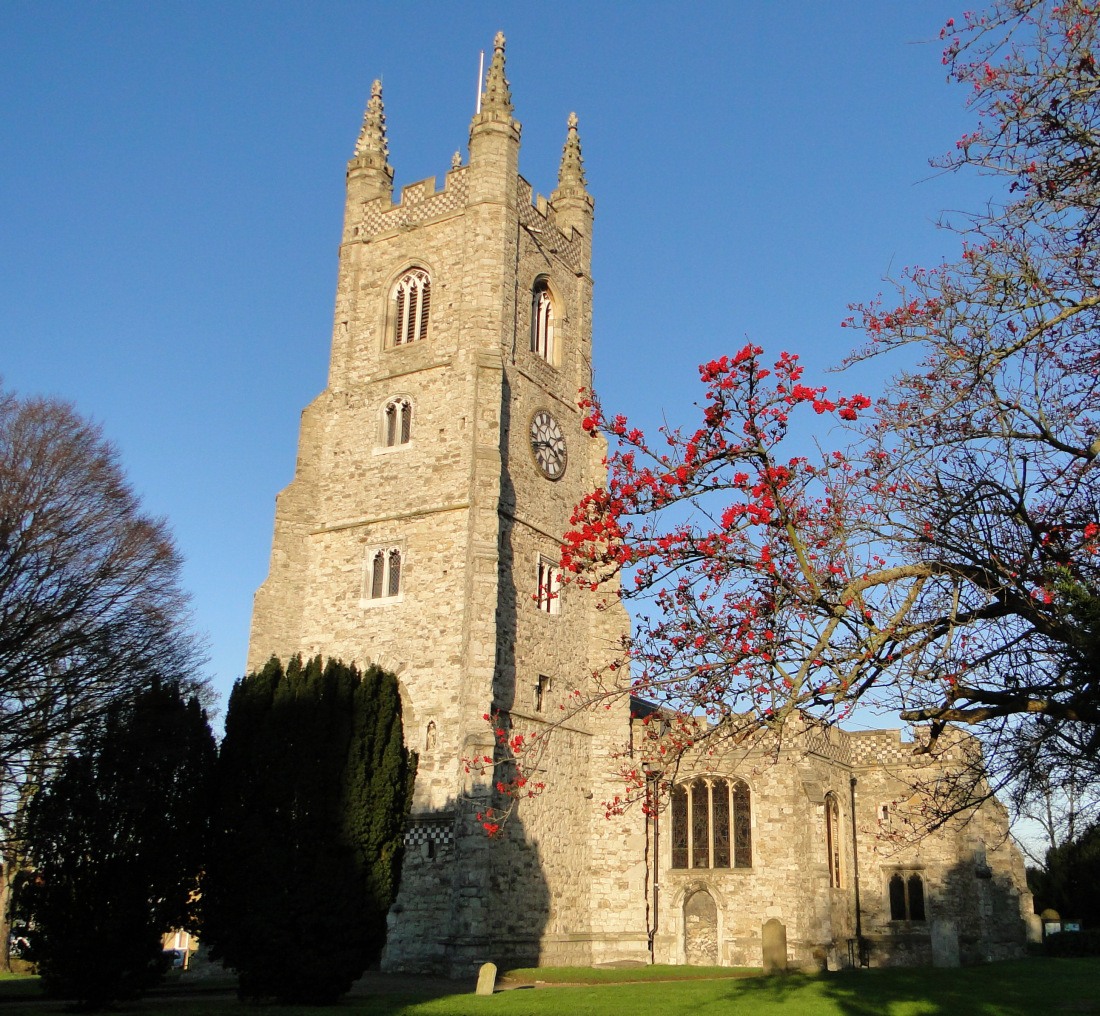
St.Marys Church

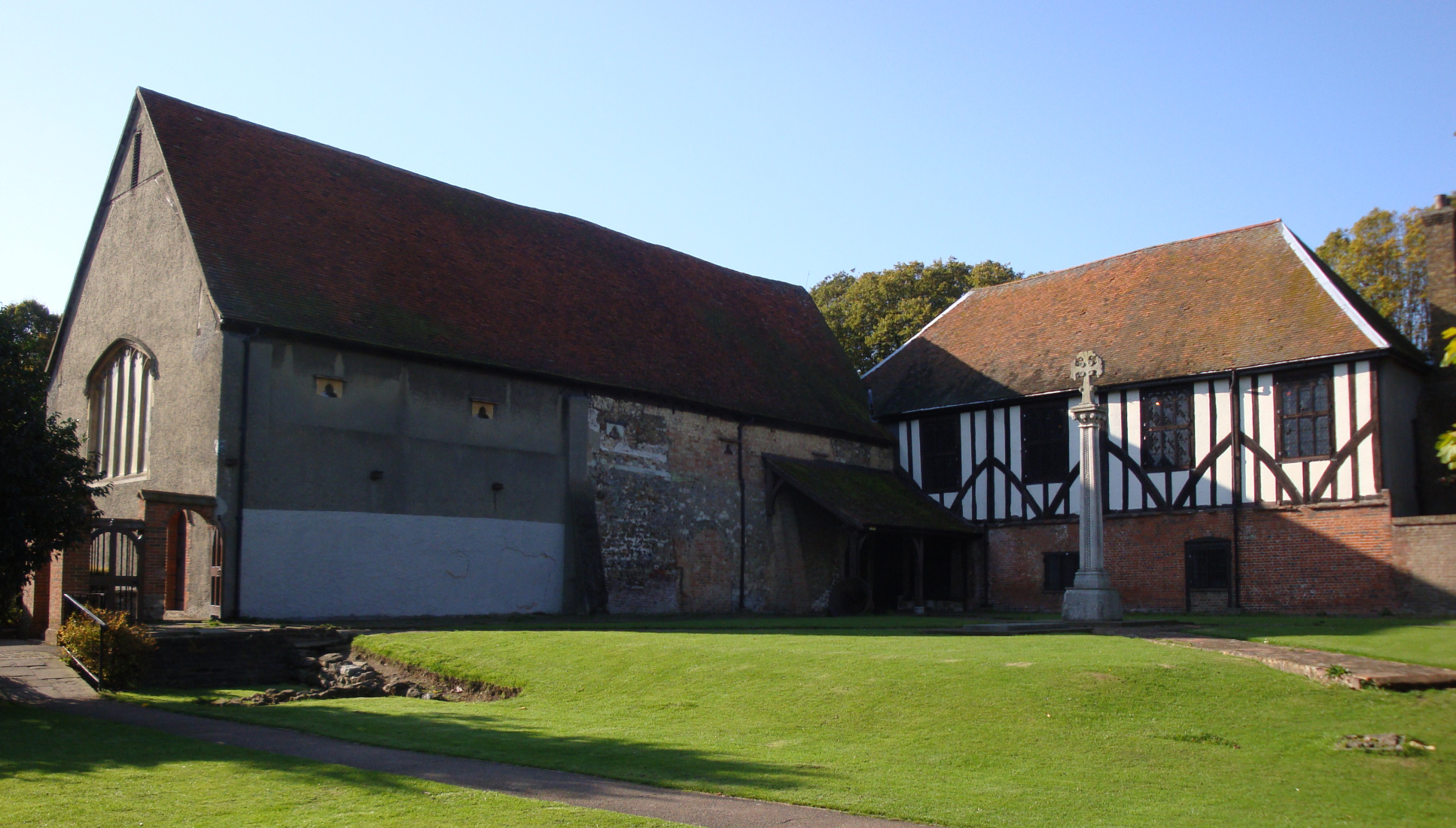
Remains of Prittlewell Priory in the grounds of Priory Park

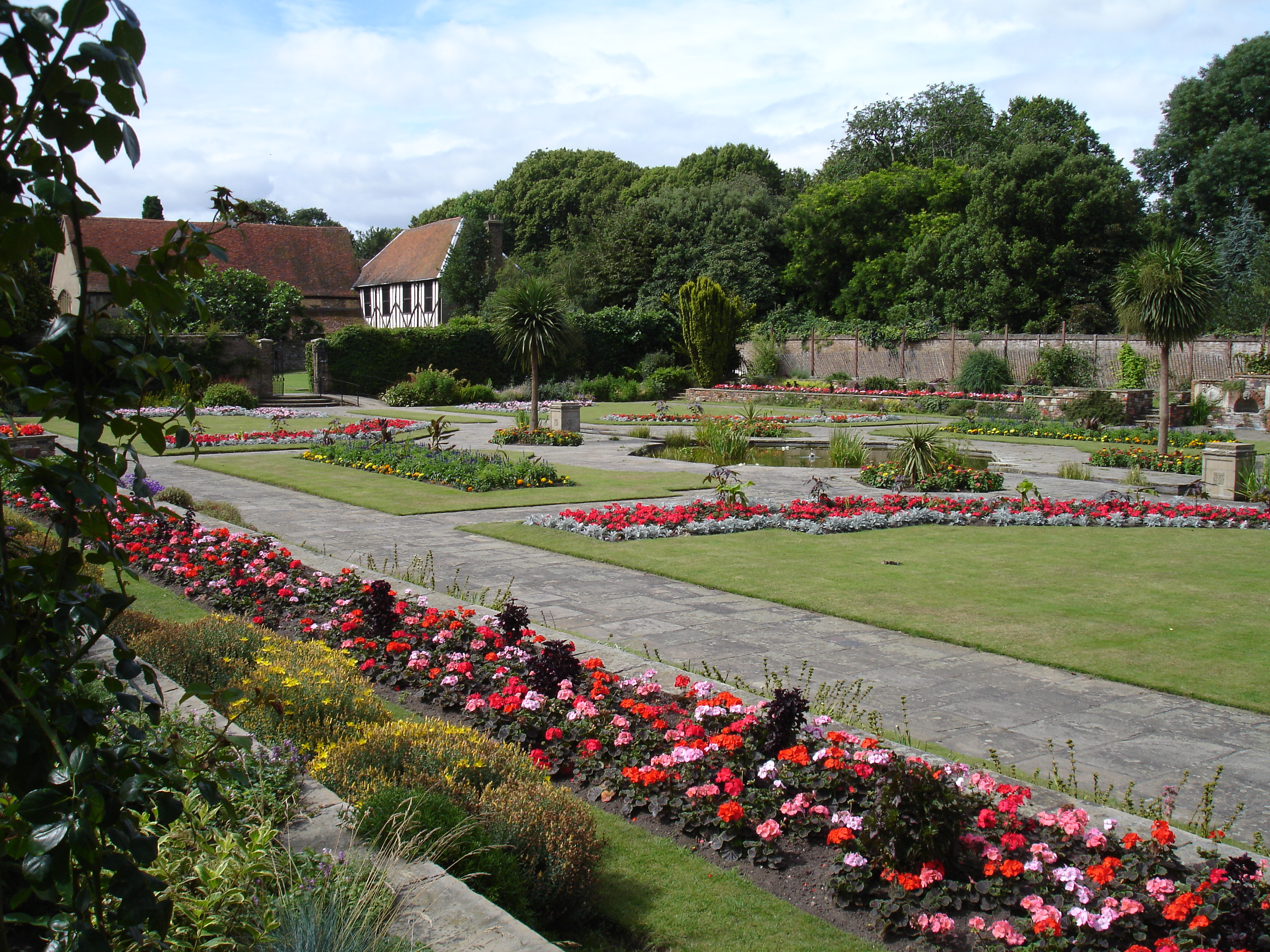
Priory Park Gardens

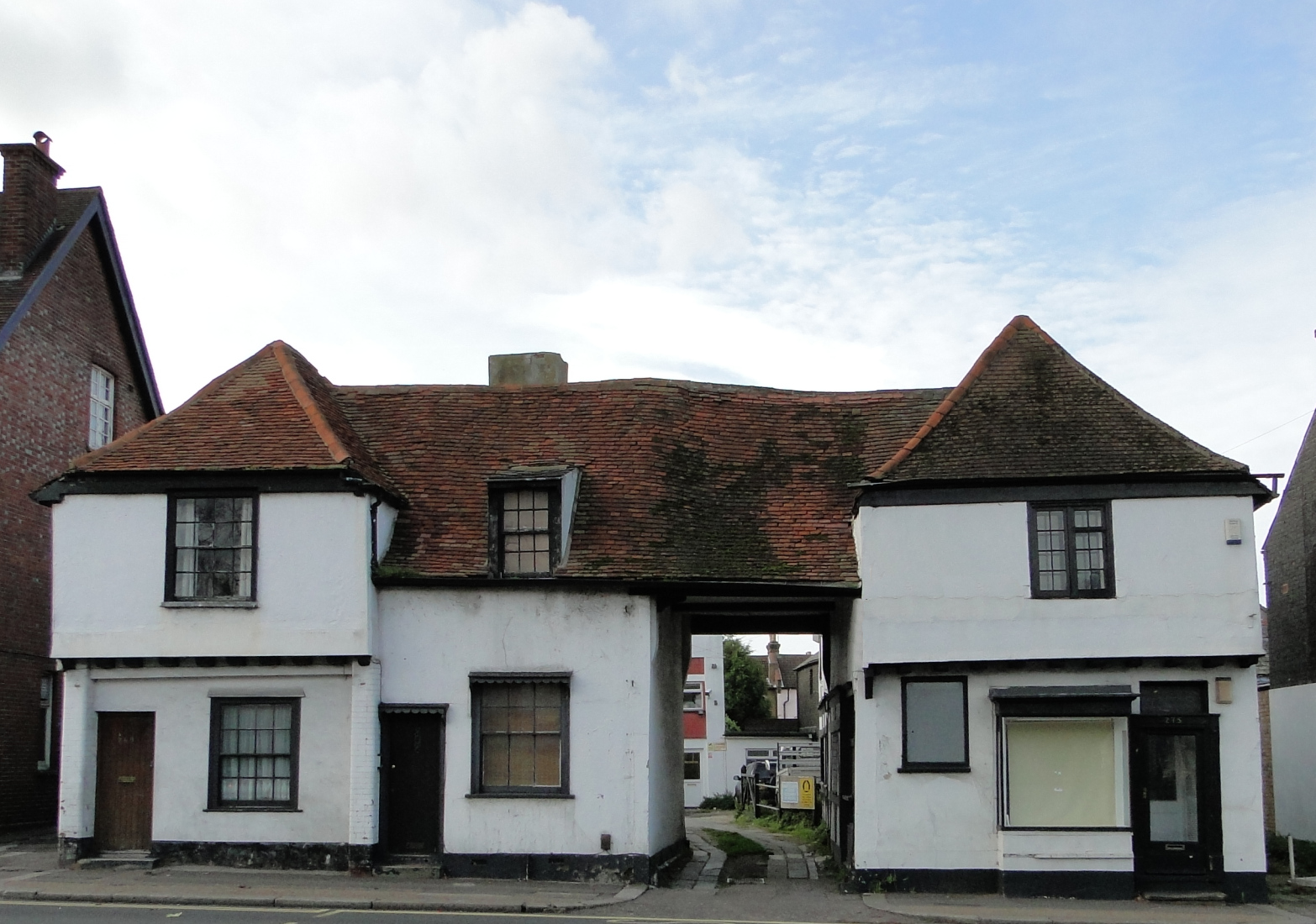
A 16th-century wooden-framed house with centre cartway, sited west of the church
