= R. A. Jones =

English jeweller & benefactor (1849–1925)

R. A. Jones MBE
- Born: Robert Arthur Jones; 20 November 1849; Everton, Liverpool
- Died: 23 May 1925 (aged 75); Southend-on-Sea, Essex
- Occupation: Jeweller
- Known for: Jeweller; Philanthropist
- Children: 2
- Awards: MBE (1920)

Robert Arthur Jones (20 November 1849 – 23 May 1925) was born in Liverpool but moved to Southend-on-Sea after working for a clock and watchmaker in Manchester. In 1890 he set up his jewellery business on Southend's High Street. He went on to become one of the most important benefactors of the town.

== R. A. Jones & Sons ==
In 1890, Jones moved from Stoke-on-Trent to Southend, purchasing the watchmaking business of Alexander Wixley. The shop was situated at 76–78 High Street, Southend (formerly no.3), although in the early days he also operated from the Pier Pavilion.

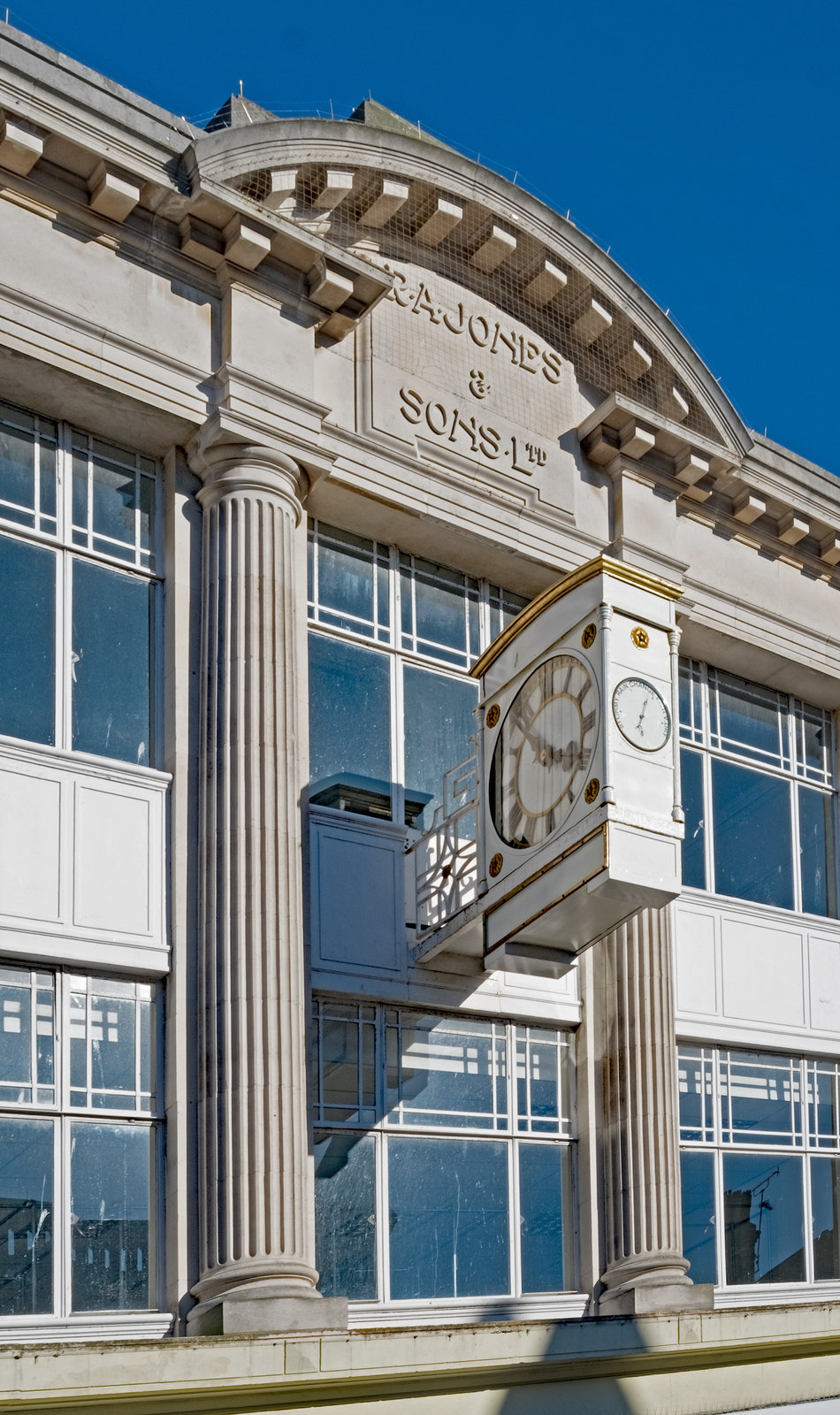
R.A. Jones building and clock in Southend-on-Sea High Street

After Jones died in 1925, the business was continued by his son, Edward Cecil, after whom the local school Cecil Jones Academy is named. It suffered severe damage during World War II when in October 1942, the area was hit by a Messerschmitt attack.

The store closed in 1979, when it was replaced by a Lavells newsagents, which in turn was replaced by Dixons, another firm started in Southend. The building is still prominent in Southend High Street, currently hosting Yours Clothing, with its large clock and the name R.A.Jones moulded into the fascia.

An image of the shop, taken c.1914, is preserved in the Essex Record Office. An archive of papers, receipts and photographs relating to the business of R. A. Jones & Sons is cared for at the Central Museum, Southend.

== Personal life ==
Jones married Emma Julia Pedley in 1878 in Stoke-on-Trent. The couple had two sons, Edward Cecil and Arthur Percy. In 1907, Jones put forward that the borough of Southend-on-Sea should change its name to Thamesmouth. The campaign failed but he named his house on Clifftown Parade after his idea. Emma died in November 1912. In 1919, Jones was made the second ever Honorary Freeman of Southend-on-Sea because of his philanthropy, while in 1920 he was awarded an MBE for his wartime roles during World War I. Jones died at the age of 75, on 23 May 1925 and his funeral saw the town turn out in force along the procession route, with the service taking place at St. John's the Baptist, with his body being interred at Priory Park. Two years after his death, a memorial oak chancel screen, designed by Sir Charles Nicholson was installed in his memory at St. John's the Baptist.

Jones' son, Edwin Cecil, followed his father with his philanthropy and service to the town, serving on the council from 1941 to 1954 and was made an Honorary Freeman of the town in 1955, subsequently also being awarded an MBE.

== Philanthropy ==
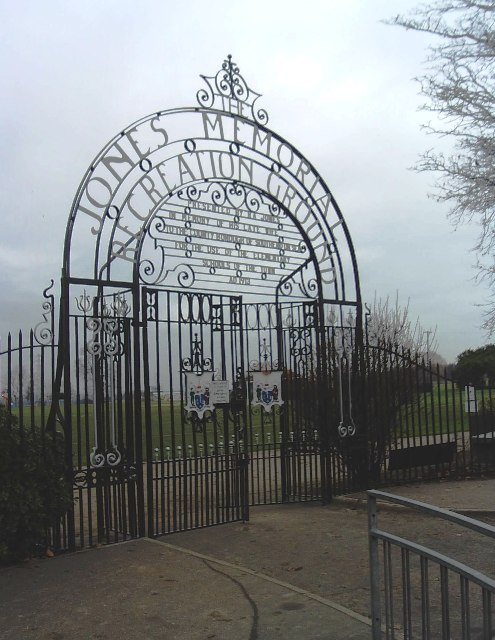
Gates to Jones Memorial Ground

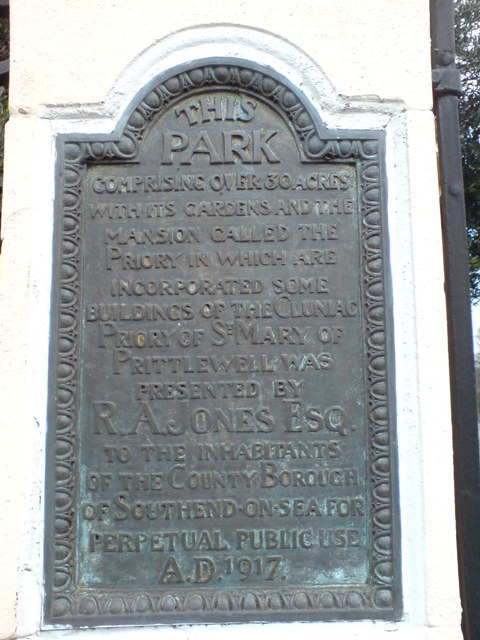
Commemorative plaque on the gates to Priory Park

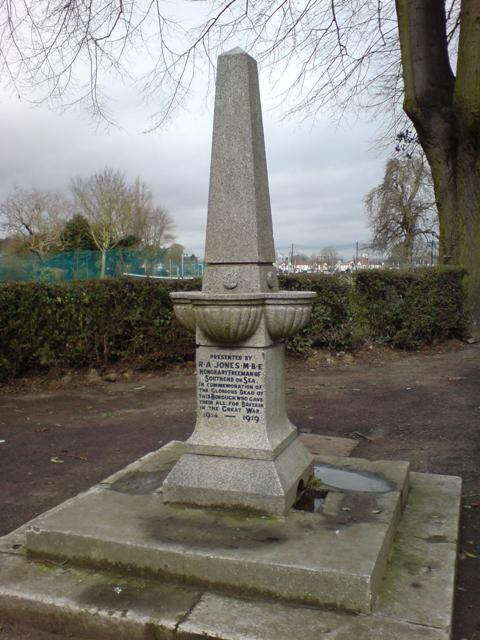
Drinking fountain in Priory Park

In 1913, Jones presented the Jones Memorial Ground to the schoolchildren of the town of Southend in memory of his wife. It had cost him £9,000.

Jones purchased Prittlewell Priory from the Scratton family, and donated the site to the town as Priory Park in 1917. Having negotiated the purchase of a further six acres, he then presented the site stating, "I think it is a sin for a man to die rich, it is a great privilege to me to be able to do this, for I believe strongly in facilities for recreation. There will now be no need for such an out of the way and costly park as Belfairs. Prittlewell, with its historic and old-world associations, its beautiful trees and lakes, and its nearness to the centre of town, is an ideal place. Part of the building would be suitable for a museum, and there would also be refreshment room accommodation, while the grounds would provide facilities for cricket, football, tennis, hockey and other sports. I propose that the name of the park should be Priory Park".

Victory Sports Ground was given to Southend by Jones in 1921 and it particularly commemorates those sportsmen who died in World War I. This public park was given for the benefit of the people of Southend and is managed in Trust by Southend-on-Sea Borough Council.

A public drinking fountain, commemorating the fallen of World War I and given by Jones, is sited in Priory Park.

The clock at the entrance to Prittlewell Square was donated by Jones.

He endowed the R A Jones in Memoriam Fund which exists to promote the education of children attending primary schools in Southend-on-Sea.

== Additional photographs ==
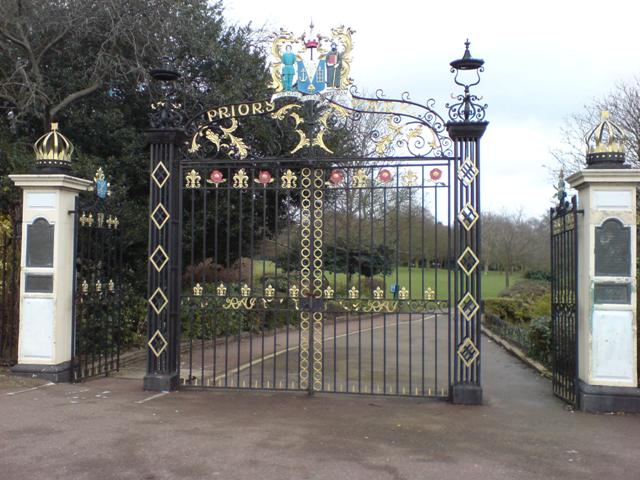
Gates to Priory Park, Prittlewell, Southend-on-Sea. The plaques on the gateposts commemorate the presentation of the park to the people of Southend, as a gift from local jeweller and benefactor R A Jones.

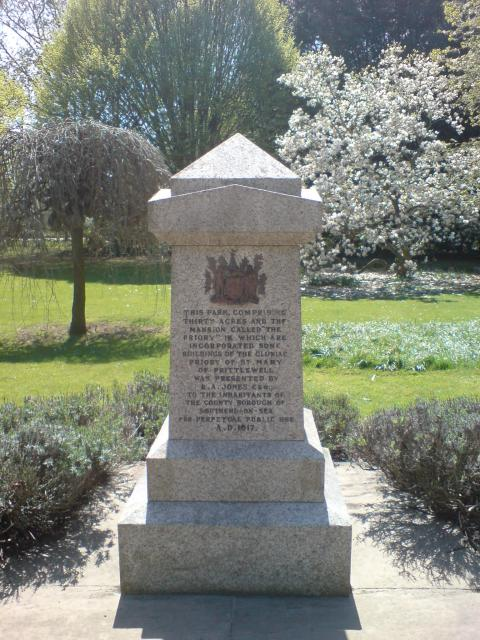
The memorial stone outside Prittlewell Priory, Southend-on-Sea, commemorating donation of the priory and surrounding park by local benefactor R A Jones in 1917.

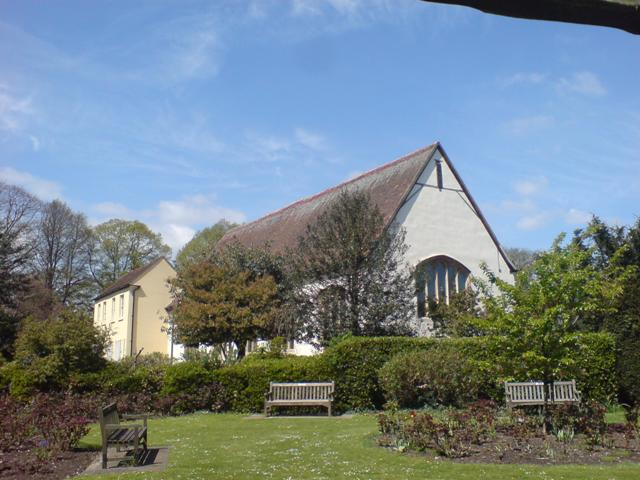
A view of Prittlewell Priory, Southend-on-Sea, from an adjacent garden in the surrounding Prittlewell Park.

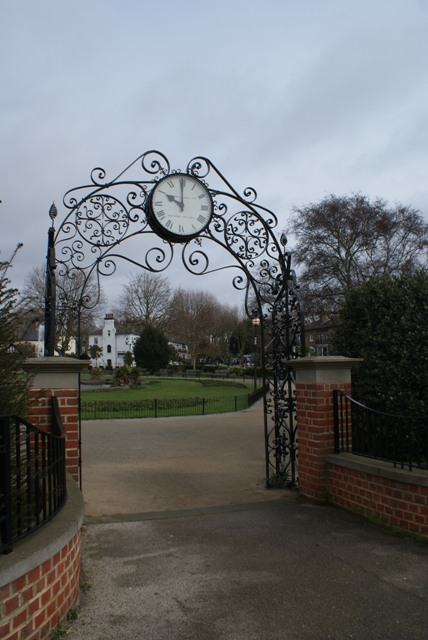
Clock in Prittlewell Square donated by R A Jones
