= List of conservation areas in Bournemouth, Christchurch and Poole =

As of January 2023, there are 48 Conservation Areas in the Bournemouth, Christchurch and Poole, in Dorset, England.

== Conservation areas ==
Name	Image	Area	Year	Notes	Refs
Ashington		Poole	2002	Historic hamlet in the green belt north of Poole	
Ashley Cross		Poole	1987, amended June 2012	Victorian suburb of Parkstone	
Avon Buildings		Christchurch	1991	Suburb of Christchurch	
Boscombe Manor		Bournemouth	1993	Shelley Manor, Shelley Manor, St Andrew's Church	
Boscombe Spa		Bournemouth	1994	St John's Church, Burlington Mansions	
Bramble Lane		Christchurch	1982	Historic suburb of Highcliffe	
Branksome Park and Chine Gardens		Poole	1981, extended November 2014	Historic suburb of Poole and woodland	
Brunstead Road		Poole	1989, amended May 2000 and boundary amended November 2014	Edwardian suburb of Poole, noted for Arts and Crafts architecture as well as the historic boundary of Dorset and Hampshire near County Gates	
Burton		Christchurch	1986	Linear settlement north of Christchurch, agricultural land and Green space	
Canford Cliffs Village and Penn Hill		Poole	1977, extended 2014	Historic suburb of Poole	
Canford Magna		Poole	1977, amended December 1992	Historic village	
Chester Road		Poole	2010	Edwardian suburb of Branksome	
Christchurch Central		Christchurch	1969	Historic centre of Christchurch Town	
Christchurch Hospital		Christchurch	1991	Historic hospital	
Churchill Gardens		Bournemouth	1993, amended December 2013	Victorian square in Boscombe	
Dean Park		Bournemouth	1993	Historic cricket ground	
East Cliff		Bournemouth	1987, amended January 1988	Historic buildings; St Swithun's Church, Historic Lansdowne, Bournemouth and Poole College	
Evening Hill		Poole	1992, amended November 2014	Historic buildings and Site of Special Scientific Interest	
Heckford Park		Poole	2010	Victorian and Edwardian area of Longfleet	
Holdenhurst Village		Bournemouth	1974, amended March 2014	Historic village	
Hurn		Christchurch	1991	Historic village	
Knole Road		Bournemouth	1993, amended April 1999	Historic area of Boscombe	
Meyrick Park and Talbot Woods		Bournemouth	1988, amended July 2009	Victorian and Edwardian suburbs, historic green spaces, Bournemouth Gardens, Wimborne Road Cemetery	
Mudeford Quay		Christchurch	1981, amended May 2008	History quayside	
Muscliff Lane		Christchurch	1992, amended July 1999	Historic village of Muscliff, and green space in the valley of the River Stour	
Oakley Lane		Poole	1987, amended December 1992	Historic village	
Old Christchurch Road		Bournemouth	1993	Historic buildings in Bournemouth Town Centre, St. Andrew's Church, Richmond Hill, Norfolk Royale Hotel, Sacred Heart Church, Bournemouth Daily Echo building, St Peter's Church	
Poole Park		Bournemouth	1995, amended October 1996	Historic park	
Portchester Road		Bournemouth	1993	Historic suburb, south of Malmesbury Park	
Purewell		Bournemouth	1991, amended June 1995	Historic suburb of Christchurch	
Ridgeway and Broadstone Park		Poole	2004, extended December 2008	Victorian village, golf course	
Sandbanks		Poole	2003	Historic homes on the north coast of Sandbanks	
Southbourne Grove		Bournemouth	1993	Historic commercial district	
Stanpit and Fisherman's Bank		Christchurch	1991, revised May 2008	Historic area along Christchurch Harbour	
Talbot Village		Bournemouth	1975, amended June 2016	Historic village, woodland and farmland, St Mark's Primary School, St Mark's Church	
The Avenue		Poole	1989, amended December 1992 and May 2000, extended November 2014	Historic suburb of Branksome Park	
The Saints		Bournemouth	1987, amended April 1999	Historic buildings around St Augustin's, St Winifred's, St Anthony's and Saint Valerie's Roads including St Augustin's Church	
Throop and Muccleshell Villages		Bournemouth	1975, amended July 1999	Historic village and farmland	
Town Centre Heritage		Poole	2012	Historic buildings across Old Town, High Street, Poole Quay, Poole Town Centre	
Tudor Road and Golf Links Road		Poole	2004, extended December 2008	Historic area of Broadstone	
Undercliff Road		Bournemouth	1990	Historic terrace in Boscombe	
Verno Lane		Christchurch	1988	Historic buildings and green space	
West Cliff and Poole Hill		Bournemouth	1989	Historic commercial district west of Bournemouth Town Centre	
West Overcliff Drive		Bournemouth	1987	Historic homes and Chine	
Westbourne		Bournemouth	1993	Historic district	
Wick		Bournemouth	1985, amended April 1991	Historic village	
Winkton		Christchurch	1989, boundary amended January 2007	Historic hamlet	

== See also ==
- List of conservation areas in England
- List of churches in Bournemouth
- List of churches in Christchurch
- List of churches in Poole
