= Alfred Bennett Bamford =

English painter (1857–1939)

- Born: 1857; Romford
- Died: 1939 (aged 81–82)
- Known for: pictures of Essex

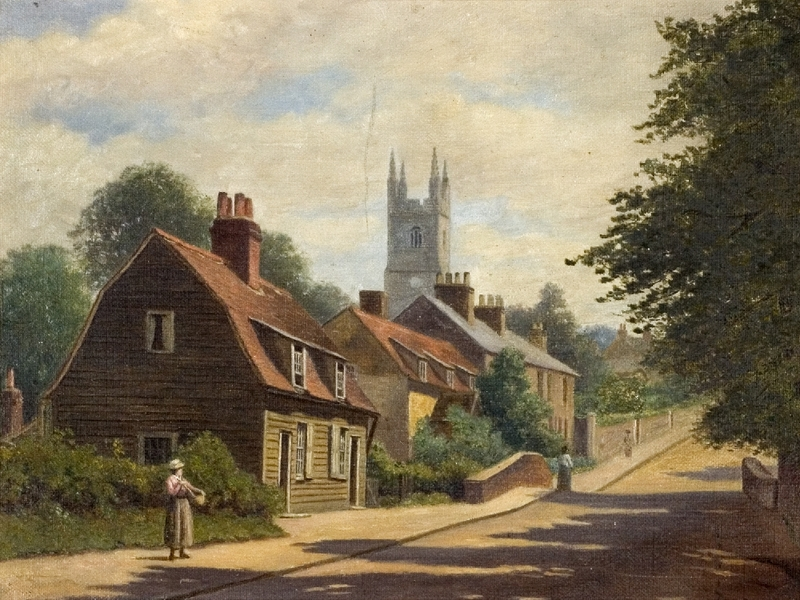
Prittlewell by Bamford

Major Alfred Bennett Bamford (1857 – 21 October 1939) was an English watercolour painter, known for pictures of Essex.

== Life ==
Bamford was born in Romford in 1857. He studied at the private Heatherley School of Art. He was a prolific artist who donated a large quantity of paintings into public ownership on condition that they were displayed. In 1930 when he moved to Cheshire he gave 150 paintings to Romford.

Bamford had been a member of a local voluntary regiment. By 1897 he was an honorary Major. During World War I he was in charge of some prisoners near Chelmsford.

Bamford has a small number of paintings in important public collections.
