= Brunthwaite =

Hamlet in Cumbria, England

Coordinates: 54.288°N 2.655°W

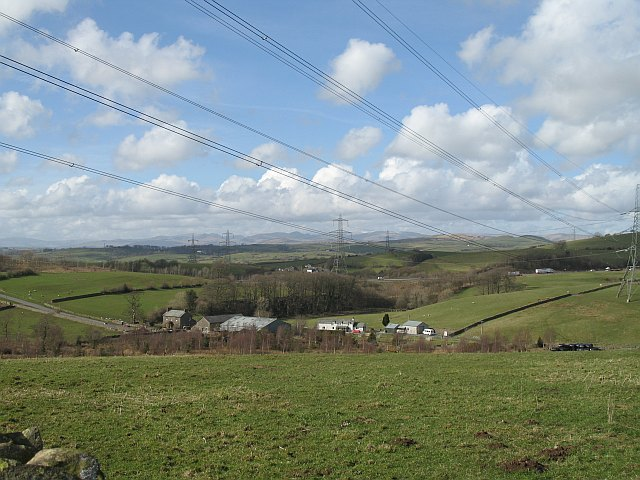
- Brunthwaite

- Location in South Lakeland Location within Cumbria
- OS grid reference: SD573882
- Civil parish: Old Hutton and Holmescales
- Unitary authority: Westmorland and Furness
- Ceremonial county: Cumbria
- Region: North West
- Country: England
- Sovereign state: United Kingdom
- Post town: KENDAL
- Postcode district: LA8
- Dialling code: 01539
- Police: Cumbria
- Fire: Cumbria
- Ambulance: North West
- UK Parliament: Westmorland and Lonsdale

Brunthwaite is a hamlet in Cumbria, England. Medieval pottery has been unearthed in the area.
