= St Mary's Church, Prittlewell =

- St. Mary's Parish Church, Prittlewell
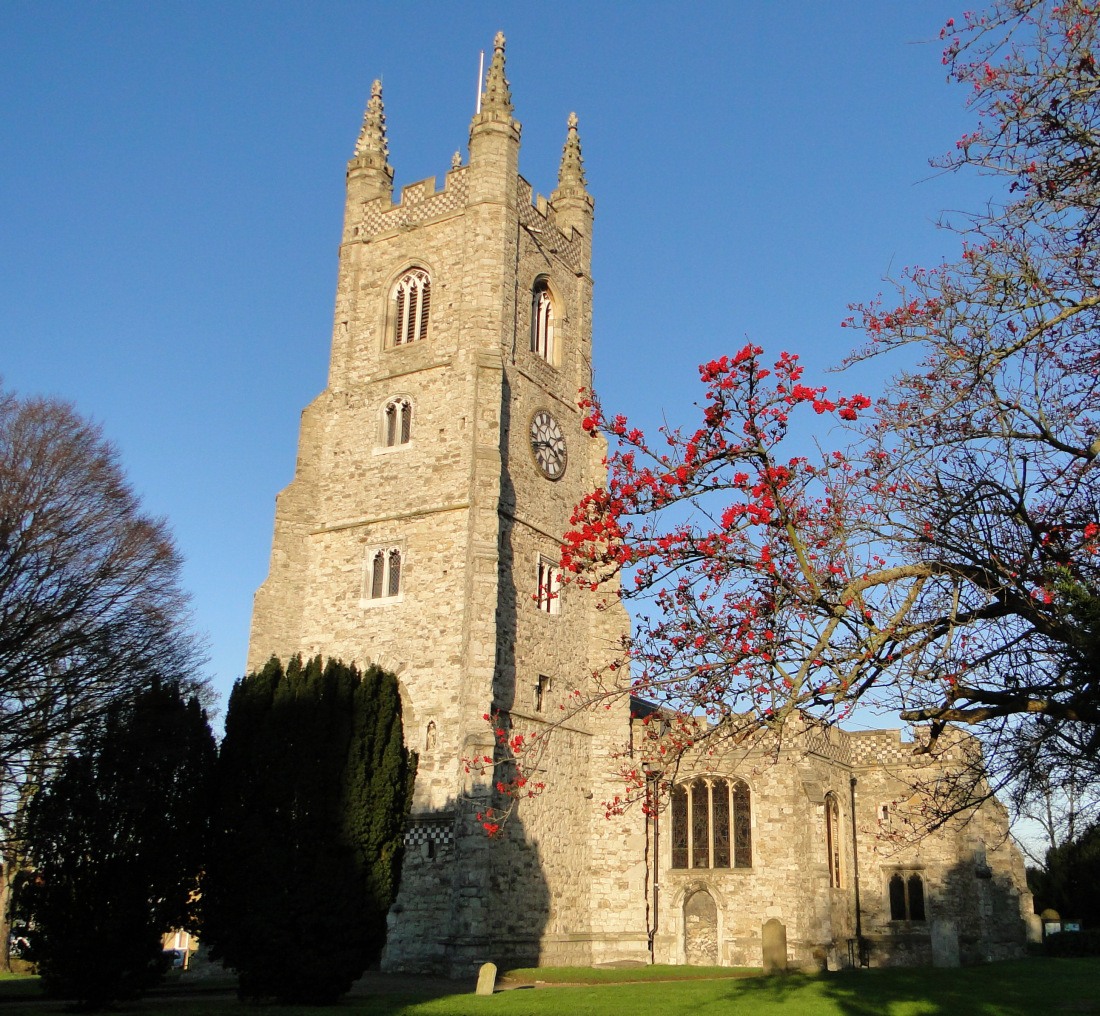
- St Mary's Church, Prittlewell, Southend-on-Sea
- St Mary's Church, Prittlewell
- 51.5489°N 0.7051°E
- Location: East Street, Prittlewell, Southend
- Country: England
- Denomination: Anglican
- Website: www.stmarysprittlewell.co.uk

History
- Status: Parish church
- Founded: 7th century
- Founder: Saxons
- Dedication: St Mary

Architecture
- Functional status: Active
- Heritage designation: Grade I
- Designated: 1951
- Architectural type: Church
- Style: Saxon
- Completed: 7th century

Administration
- Province: Canterbury
- Diocese: Chelmsford
- Parish: Prittlewell

St Mary's Church is a Grade I listed parish church in the suburb of Prittlewell in the city of Southend-on-Sea, in the ceremonial county of Essex, England. It is the largest and one of the oldest churches in the county. The church is open for worship, while community events are held in its hall. The church is also connected to two local Church of England schools.

== Architecture ==
The church was founded in the 7th century as a chapel by the Saxons. From the 12th century until the 17th century it was extended and became the largest church in the county of Essex, as well as one of the oldest churches in the county.

== Gallery ==
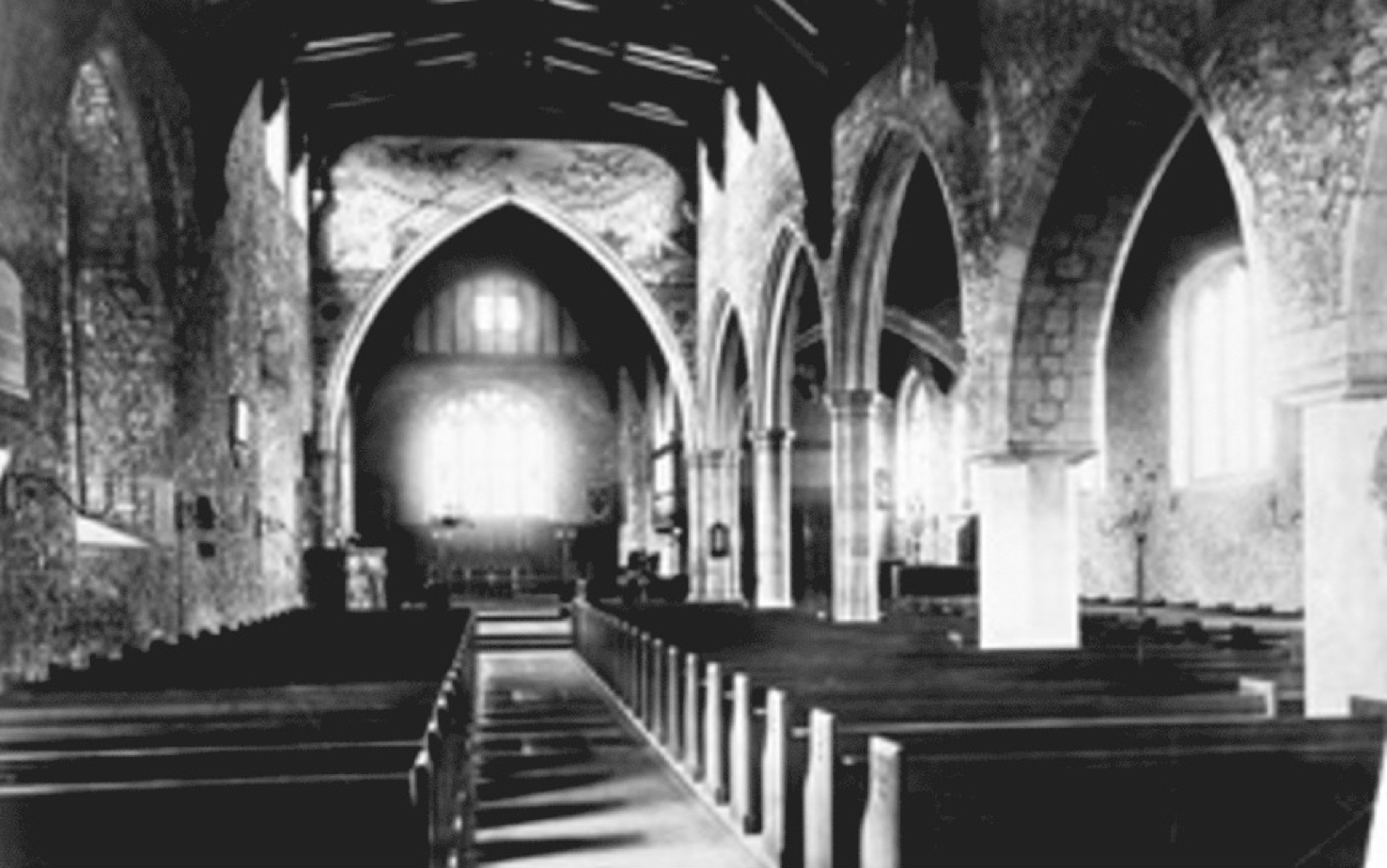
The interior of the church in 1891

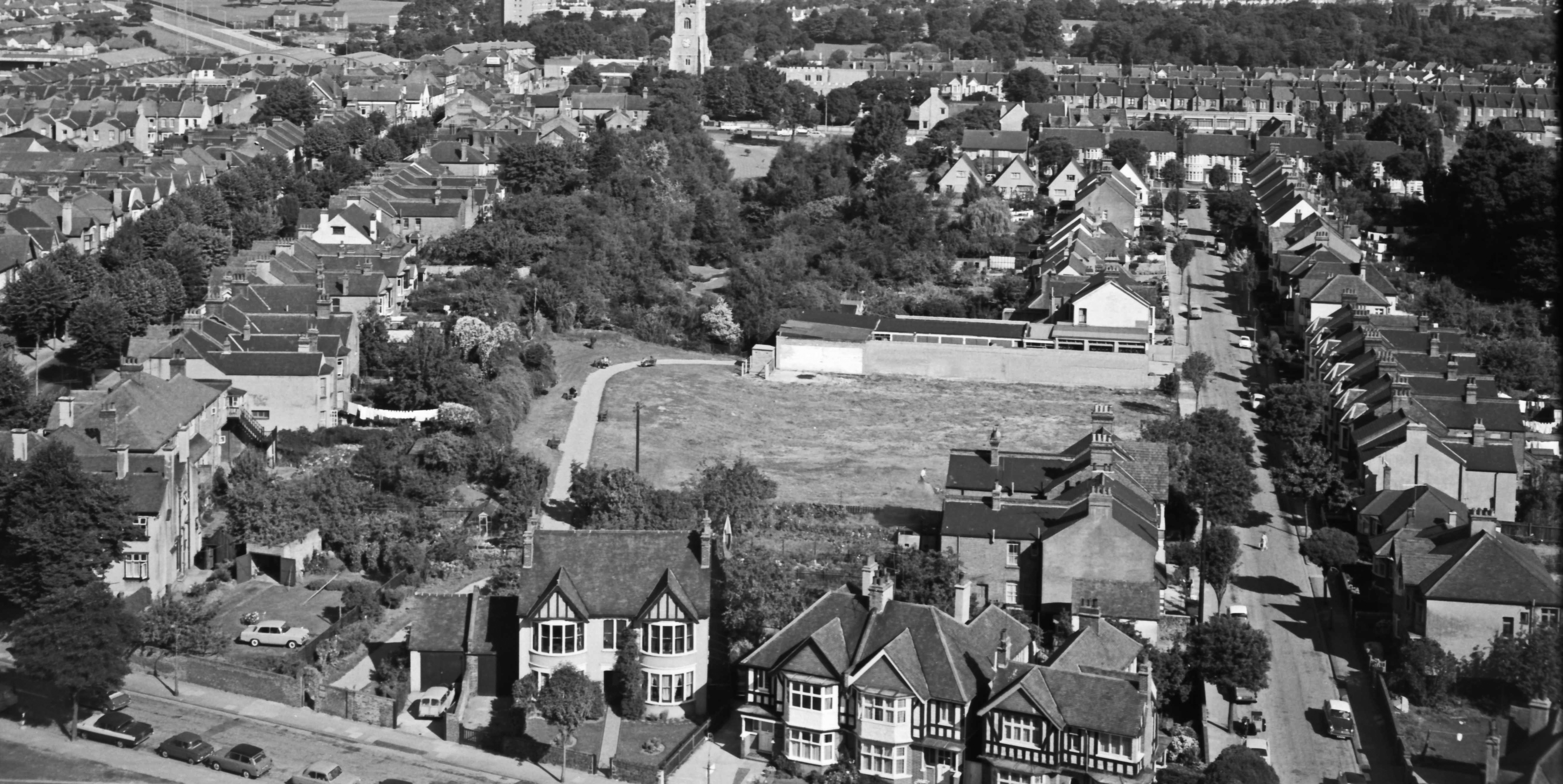
The church from Southend Victoria railway station in the 1950s

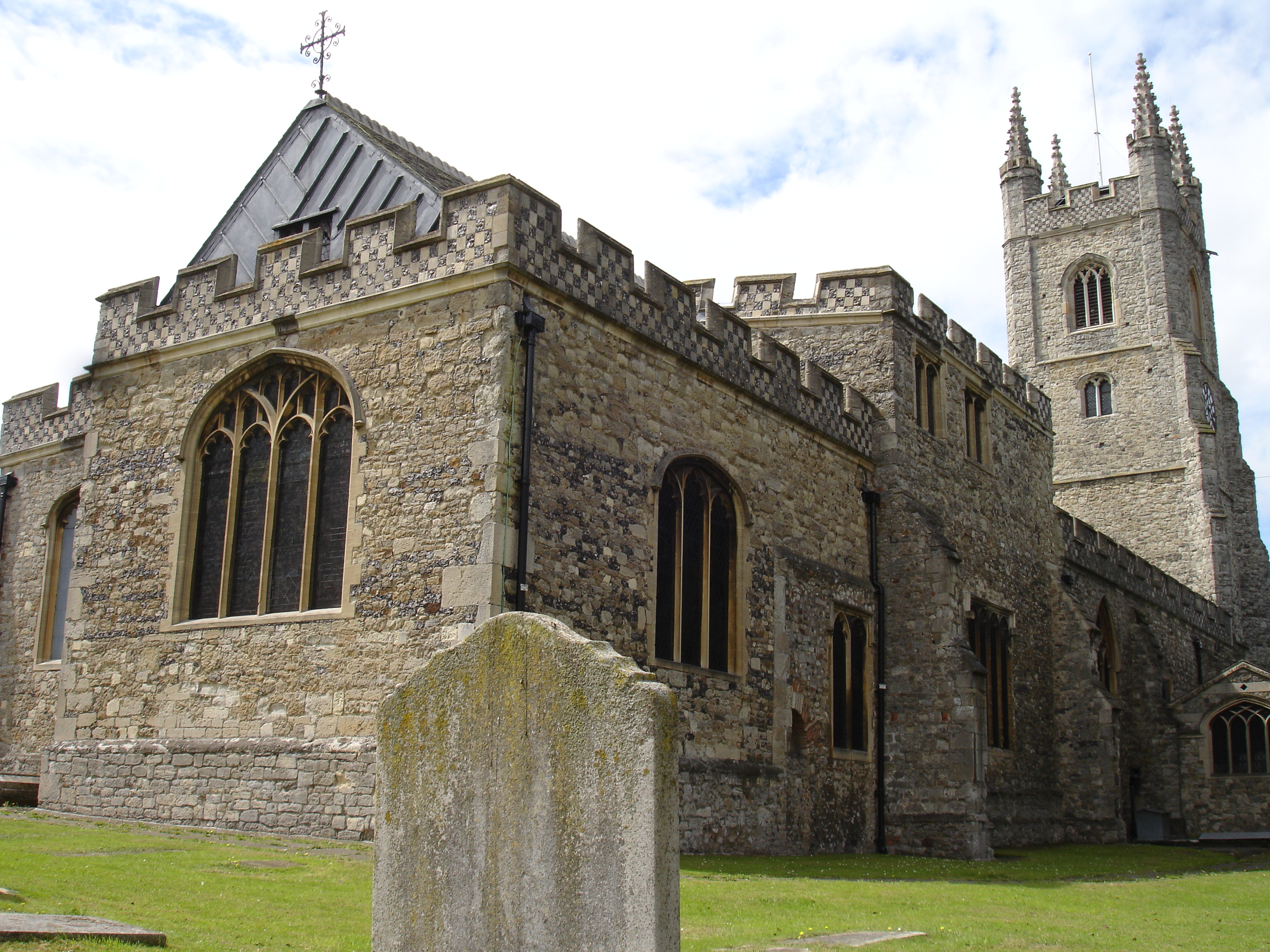
The church from the northeast end of the building
