= Lavells Newsagents Ltd =

- Industry: Grocery, Records
- Founded: 1922
- Defunct: 1987
- Fate: Merged with Martin the Newsagent plc
- Successor: Martin/John Menzies
- Headquarters: Lavells House, Hockliffe Street, Leighton Buzzard, Bedfordshire
- Parent: Herbert Mansfield (1933-1948), Callard & Bowser (1948-1951), Arthur Guinness & Company (1951-Closure)
- Subsidiaries: Martin

Lavells Newsagents Ltd was founded in 1922 as Lavell & Co Ltd, a private company operating a small group of High Street outlets in central London specialising in confectionery.

== History and origins ==
The origin of the name 'Lavells' is unknown.

The founder, Arthur MacKenzie was a wholesale confectioner from West Kensington. Herbert Mansfield became company secretary soon after and acquired the company outright in 1933.

Lavells successfully survived the war years in spite of the difficulty of rationing. In 1948 it became a publicly quoted company and was subsequently acquired by Callard & Bowser, who in turn were acquired by Arthur Guinness & Company Limited in 1951.

== Guinness and expansion ==
The company then entered an era of rapid expansion and acquired many more shops including newsagents. These acquisitions were chains of shops and warehouses operated by Hancock & Co. in Manchester and Gordon's Limited in Leeds.

This expansion firmly established Lavells in the news agency field and also involved them in the operation of sub-post offices.

== Morison Son & Jones ==
It was at this time, that the company was opening prime High Street units and responsibility for the chain passed to the Guinness subsidiary Morison Son & Jones.

The management were keen to set up a chain of departmental stores to complement their newsagents. As a result, a new fascia was developed under the name 'Morison's Department Stores'. Morison's opened branches in the North, Midlands and Dover, Kent. The Dover branch was opened on Friday 19 November 1976 by Arthur Brough from TVs 'Are You Being Served'.

In 1977, Lavells and the pharmacy shops of Guinness were set up as a new company, Guinness Retail Holdings Limited (GRH) and all Morison's were re-branded 'Lavells for Leisure'.

The surplus floor space at the Dover branch was converted into a training centre for Lavells branch managers, and run by Mrs M Michie.

== Martin the Newsagent plc ==
The chain was going from strength-to-strength and in 1984 GRH purchased the much larger Martin the Newsagent plc.

Prior to the take-over of Martin, Lavells had 1,215 members of staff in 114 branches and 885 delivery staff.

== John Menzies ==
In 1987, 66 of the largest Martin and Lavells stores were sold to rival retailer John Menzies and all of the smaller stores were converted to use the Martin fascia.

== WHSmith ==
In the 1990s, John Menzies Retail was purchased by WHSmith, and as a result many WHSmith units were once Lavells.

== Lavells House ==
The headquarters was at Lavells House, Hockliffe Street, Leighton Buzzard, Bedfordshire, LU7 1JF. Although the company left the building many years ago, the building still bears the name 'Lavells House'.

== Logo ==
The most famous logo consisted of a 3D cube made up of the letters L A V E L L S. This was followed by the 'for leisure' strap-line. The carrier bags simply read 'Lavells Multiple Retailers'.

In the late 1970s, a London advertising agency developed the brown and green stripe logo which was used until the Martin merger.
