= 1885 Shoeburyness artillery accident =

Disaster in Essex, England

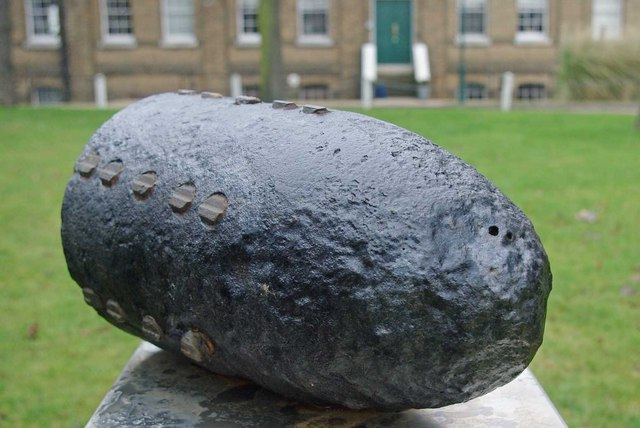
19th-century artillery shell, displayed in Shoeburyness as part of a memorial to those killed in the accident.

The accidental explosion of an artillery shell at the Shoeburyness artillery ranges on 26 February 1885 that killed seven Royal Artillery personnel.

== The 1885 explosion ==
On 26 February 1885 there was an accidental explosion at the Royal Artillery experimental ranges at Shoeburyness, Essex. A squad under Captain Francis Goold-Adams, the assistant superintendent of experiments, had been firing a breech-loading gun to test some fuses. Colonel Lyon had come from Woolwich to carry out experiments with fuses of his own invention and a rocket float, both of which were too hazardous to be attempted at the Arsenal. Gunner Robert Allen had difficulty fitting one fuse into a shell and Sergeant-Major Sam Daykin took over. He was gently tapping the fuse into position when there was an explosion. Seven staff were killed outright or fatally injured:

- Gunner Robert Allen (aged 38)
- Gunner James Underwood (aged 31 or 34)
- Sergeant-Major Sam Daykin (aged 34)
- Captain Francis Michael Goold-Adams, the assistant superintendent of experiments at Shoeburyness (aged 30)
- Colonel Walter Aston Fox Strangeways, the commandant at Shoeburyness and superintendent of experiments (aged 52)
- Colonel Frank Lyon, the superintendent of the research laboratory at Woolwich Arsenal (aged 51)
- Mr James Frederick Rance, a foreman examiner of fuses at Woolwich (aged 34).

=== The injuries ===
Gunner Allen was killed instantly having his right leg blown away and was all but decapitated, a piece of the shell striking him in the neck and nearly severing his head. Colonel Fox-Strangeways had one foot blown off and his leg shattered; Colonel Lyon had both legs blown off just below the thigh; Captain Goold-Adams had both legs blown off and his face mutilated; and Sergeant-Major Daykin had one leg blown off from the thigh; Gunner Underwood had his leg blown off, and another gunner was wounded severely. Mr. Rance was severely wounded in the leg, while Mr. Lowe, assistant manager of the Woolwich laboratory and others had narrow escapes.

Captain Goold-Adams and Sergeant Major Daykin both succumbed to their injuries. Colonel Fox-Strangways and Colonel Lyon had both legs amputated above the knee. However both succumbed from exhaustion and died the next day. Gunner Underwood also succumbed to his injuries.

=== Funerals ===
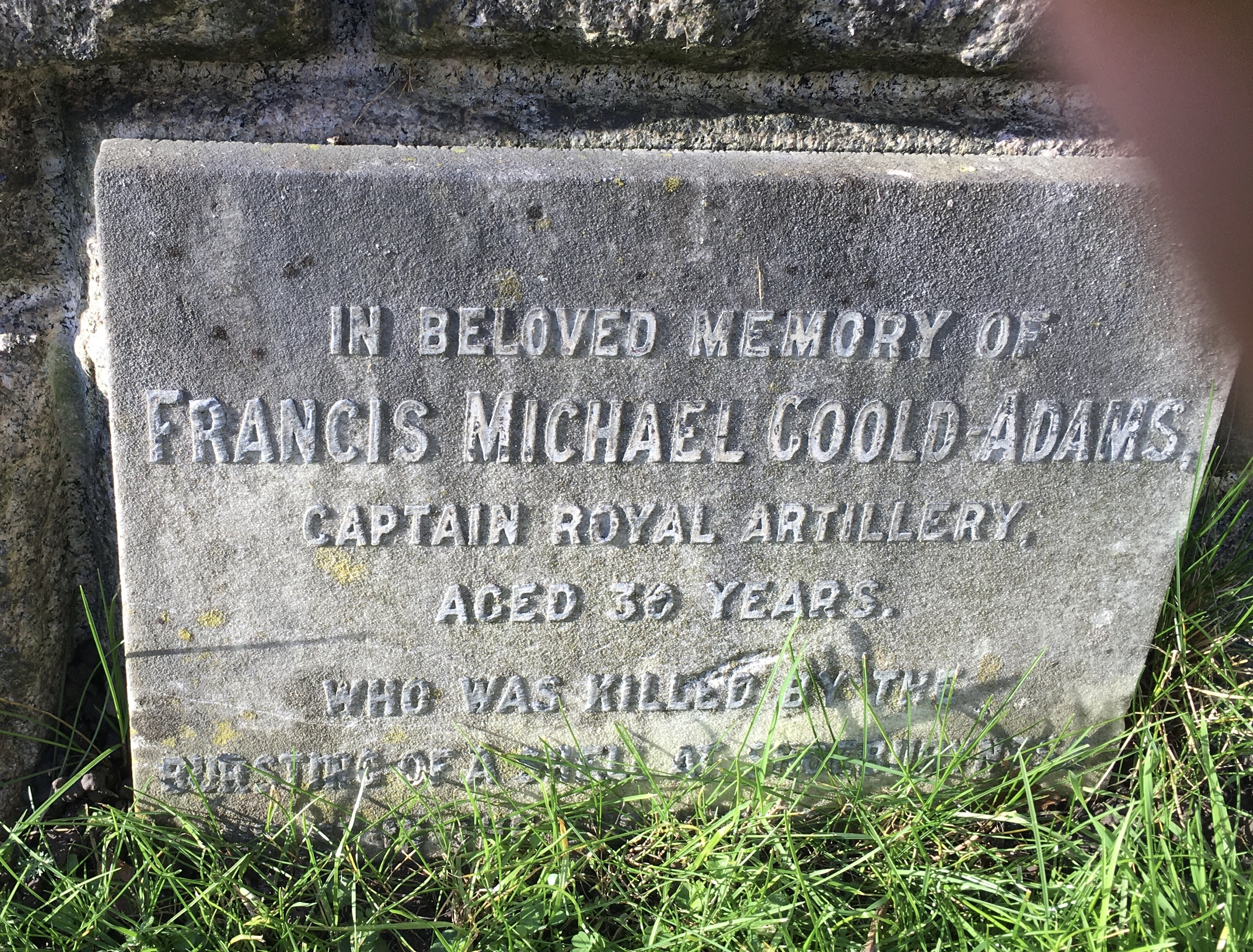
Grave of Francis Michael Goold Adams detail

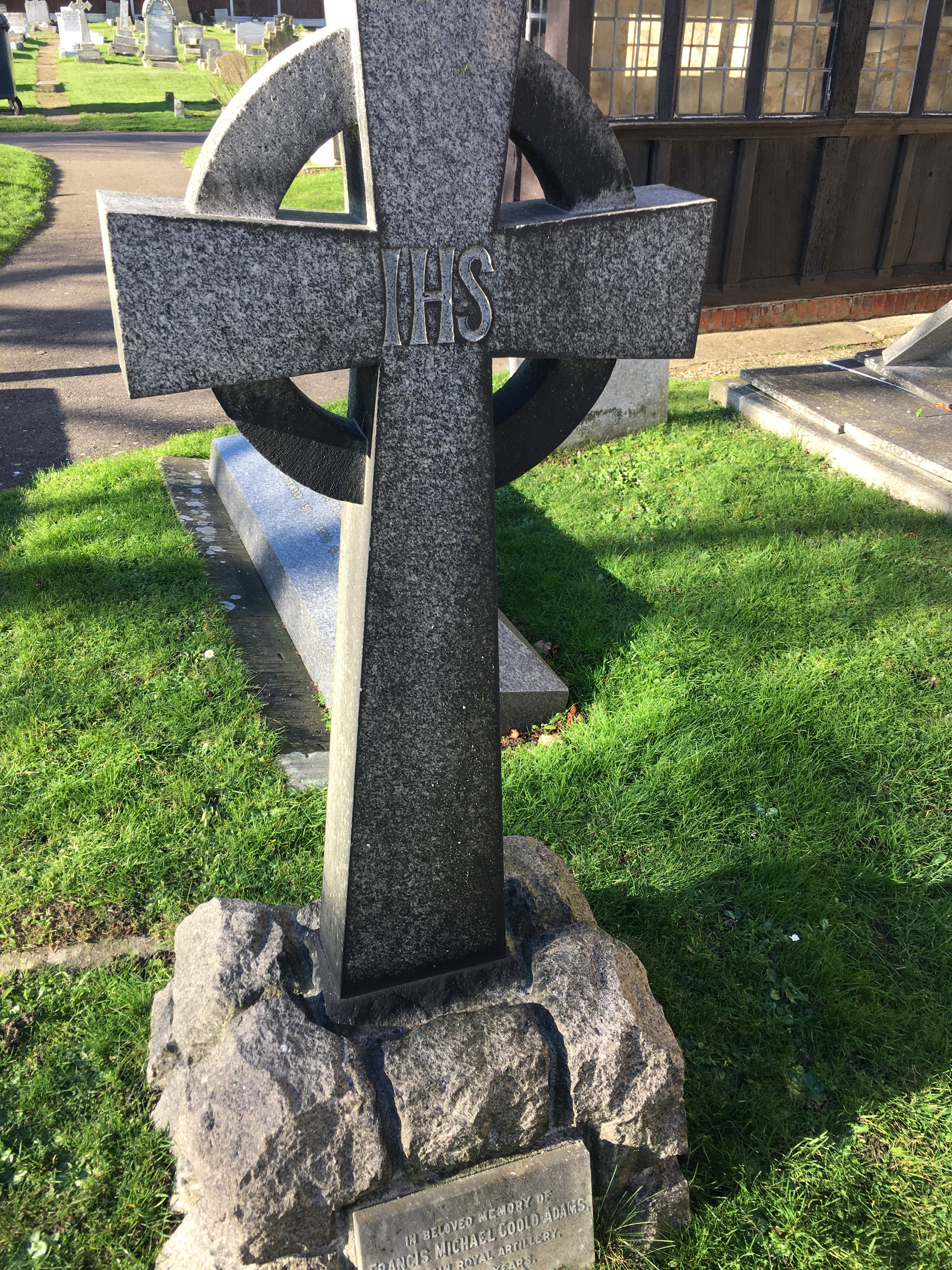
Francis Michael Goold Adams

When the funerals of four of the victims took place with full military honours on 2 March 1885 at St. Andrew's church, Shoebury, ‘every shop and factory in the whole of Southend District closed’, The explosion, the funerals, and the inquest were reported in the local press. The funeral service for Captain Goold-Adams was conducted by the rector of Leigh-on-Sea, Essex, that of Sergeant-Major Daykin by the chaplain to the forces, and that of Gunners Allen and Underwood by the rector of Prittlewell, Essex. There is a memorial tablet to all the victims in the garrison church at Shoeburyness; the officer's grave, close to the south door of St. Andrew's church, is marked by a gravestone as is that of Sergeant Major Sam Daykin elsewhere in the churchyard.

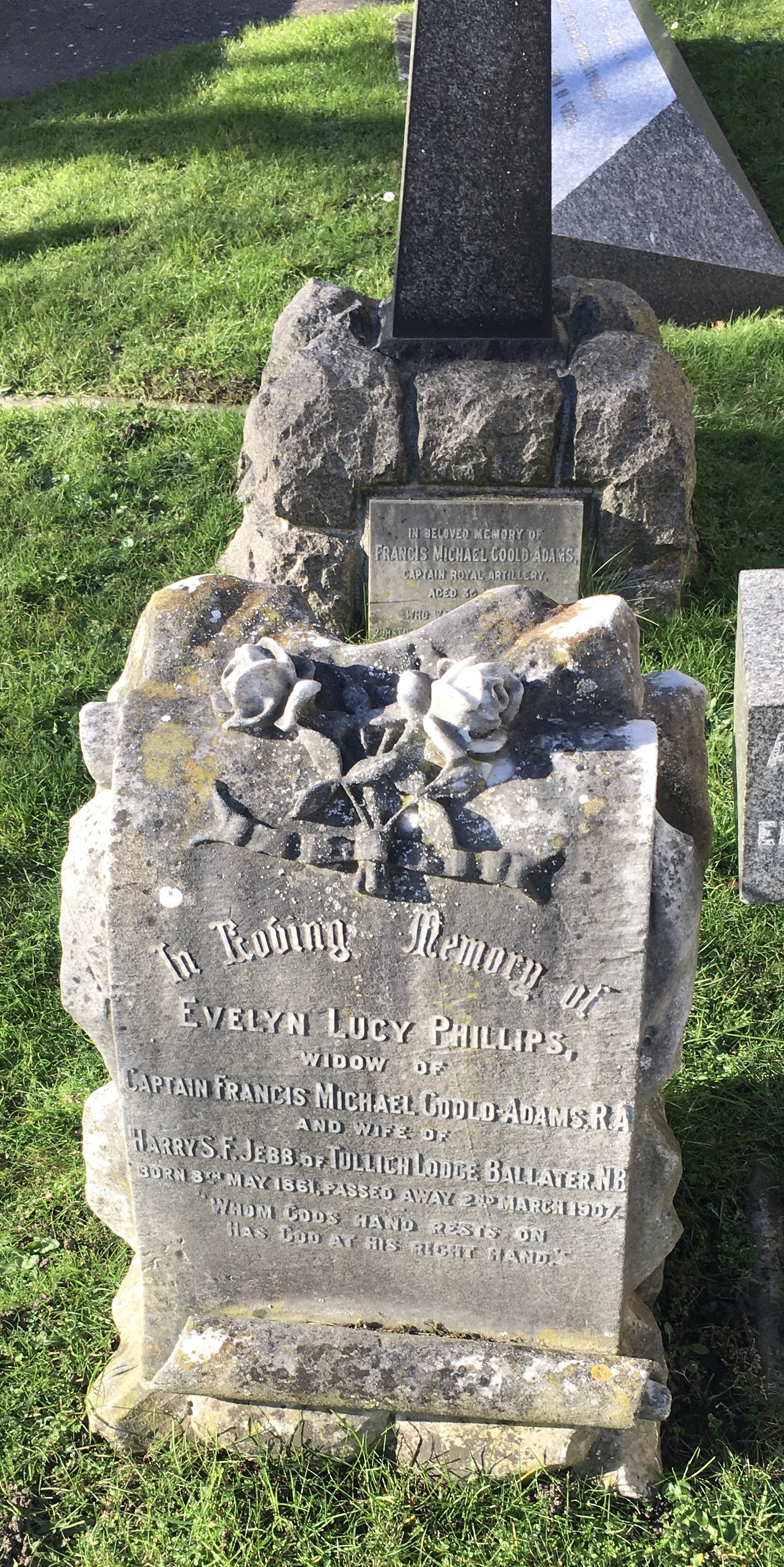
Grave of Evelyn Lucy Phillips

Monumental inscription: In beloved memory of / Francis Michael Goold-Adams / Captain Royal Artillery / aged 30 Years / who was killed by the bursting of a shell at Shoeburyness / whilst in the execution of his duty

Francis Goold-Adams' younger brother Major Sir Hamilton John Goold-Adams (1858-1920) was a colonial administrator and Governor of Queensland from 1915 to 1920. Three of the dead from the explosion were buried elsewhere: Commandant Fox-Strangeways at Exeter, Devon; Colonel Lyon at Warrington, Cheshire; and Mr Rance at Woolwich, Kent. In memory of the dead a memorial hospital for the families of officers and soldiers of the Shoeburyness garrison was opened by voluntary subscription. This was later taken over as a military hospital in 1909 and was in use throughout the First World War. Captain Goold Adams’ widow later remarried and died at Steyning in Sussex, she too was buried in St. Andrew's churchyard next to her late husband:

Monumental inscription: In loving memory of / Evelyn Lucy Phillips / widow of / Captain Francis Michael Goold Adams R.A. and wife of / Harry S.F. Jebb of Tullich Lodge Ballater N.B. / born 8 May 1861 passed away 2 March 1907 / whom God's hand rests on / has God at his right hand

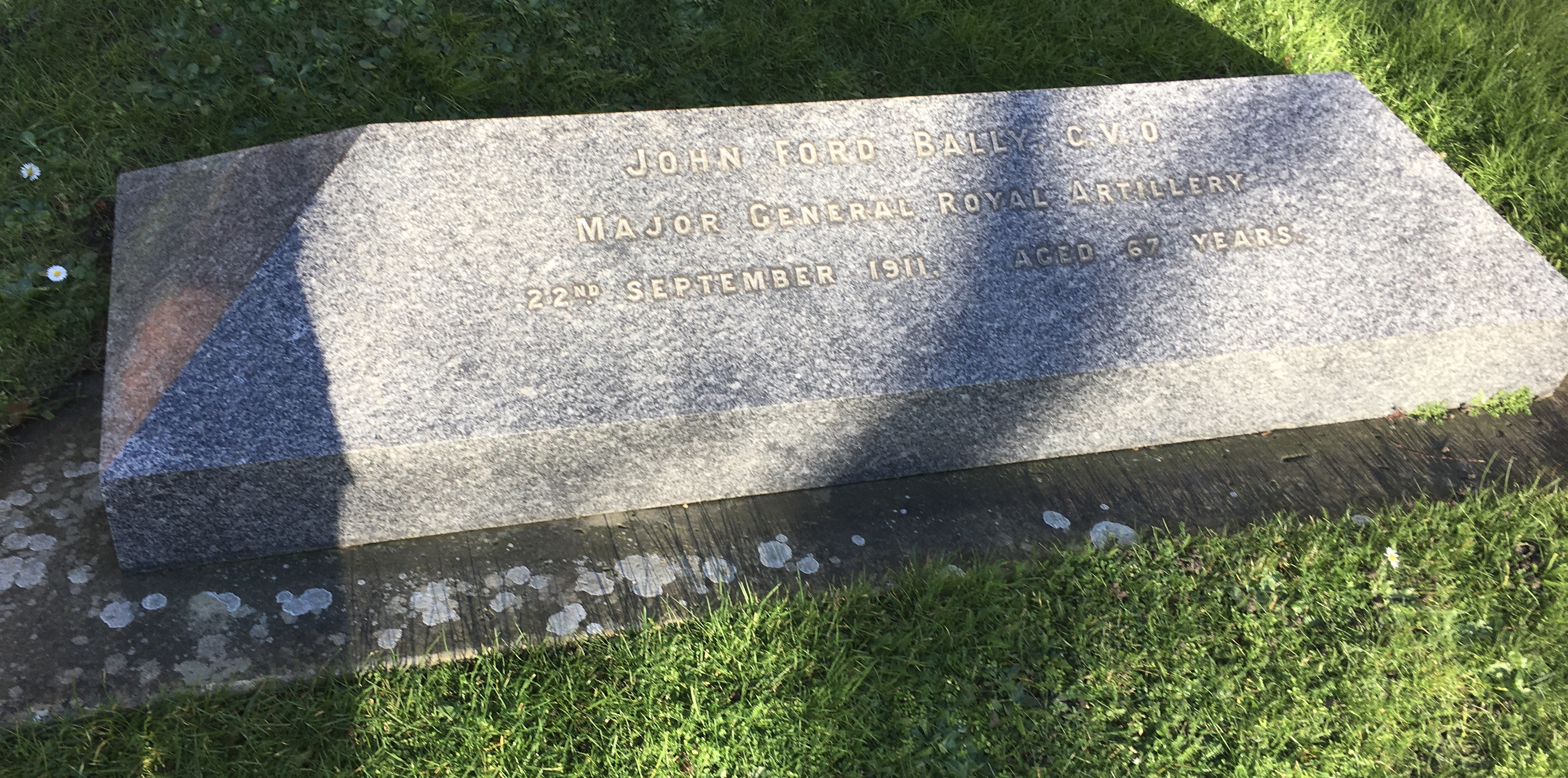
Grave of John Ford Bally

One fortunate escape from the 1885 explosion was that of Major John Bally, who was walking near to the smith's shop at the time; ‘a splinter flying over the roof of the shop struck him, but was embedded in a book in his side-pocket and he was saved from serious injury’. Major Bally later became Major-General Commanding Artillery Gibraltar (1902-5). He died at Shoeburyness and is buried close to the south porch at St. Andrew's church:

Monumental inscription: John Ford Bally C.V.O. / Major-General Royal Artillery / 22 September 1911 aged 67 years On the other face: Frances Grace Constance / daughter of Revd Frederick Downes Panter MA / and widow of Major-General John Ford Bally C.V.O. Royal Artillery / Died 8 October 1913 / aged 69 years.

== Commemoration of the 1885 explosion ==
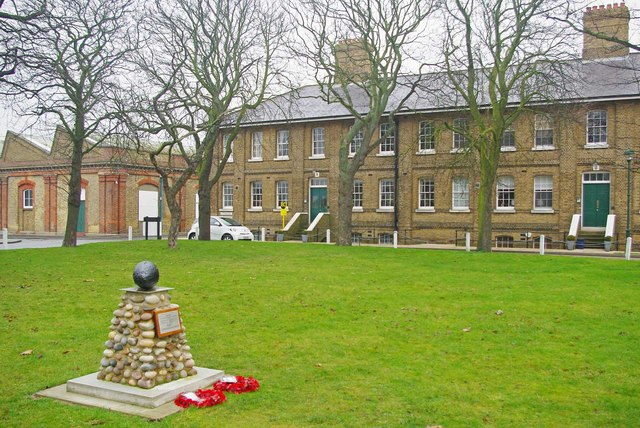
Memorial cairn unveiled close to the location of the accident 100 years after the event

On 26 February 1985, the hundredth anniversary of the explosion, a memorial cairn was dedicated at Shoeburyness to the men killed in the explosion.

== Other Shoeburyness gun accidents ==
During its operational life the establishment at Shoeburyness was the location of several serious gun or shell accidents.

- On 8 April 1890 Alexander Smith (aged 15) was hitting a 'dead' shell he had found in the shell yard at Shoeburyness. The shell exploded and he was killed.
- On 4 August 1905 an explosion occurred when a spark from a recently fired gun ignited two cartridges which exploded. Gunner M'Dougal, Sergeant Paterson, Corporal Crawley and Bombardier Phillips were burned and scorched.
- On 15 November 1912 a new explosive was being tried in an 80-ton gun as used in the Dreadnought class of battleship. An explosion occurred and the gun was shattered. Four people were seriously injured and conveyed to the garrison hospital. They were Staff Sergeant Croft, Gunners Martin and Gissen and a civilian named Rose. Fragments of the gun were found two to three miles away.
- On 9 January 1913 an 18-pounder gun was being tested. Due to a clerical error by the officer in charge, a charge of 1lb 15oz 5 drams was used instead of 1lb 5oz. When fired the breech of the gun blew out killing gunners Walter Pearson (aged 34) and Harry Hubbard (aged 26). An inquest was held on 11 January 1913 which recorded a verdict of accidental death. Arrangements were subsequently made for men to be put under cover when the first round of any gun was fired. A memorial to the victims was erected in St Andrew's church Shoeburyness, tall headstone west side of central path: "Sacred to the memory / of / Gunners Walter Edward Pearson / and Harry Hubbard / Royal Garrison Artillery / who were killed in a gun accident / at the new ranges Shoeburyness / 9th January 1913 / Father into thy hand I commend my spirit / This stone is erected by the officers / non-commissioned officers and men of / the experimental department."
- On 23 December 1915 Captain Francis Gainsworthy Lane Pool (aged 35) was killed while examining a charge from a quick-firing gun that had misfired.
- On 30 April 1917 four gunners: Edward Charles Berry (aged 26); William Butcher (aged 32); Edgar A. Swift (aged 33); and Albert Ernest Eves, were killed in a gun accident at the new ranges Shoeburyness. In the SE corner of St. Andrew's churchyard, Commonwealth War Graves Commission headstones: 8938 Gunner / A.E. Eves / Royal Garrison Artillery / 1st May 1917 age 36; and 2337 Gunner / E. Swift / Royal Garrison Artillery / 1st May 1917.
- On 13 April 1939 Sergt. William Richard Cecil Luscombe (aged 37) of the Royal Artillery was killed when a two-pounder gun exploded at Shoeburyness Ranges, Gunners M. O'Connell and J. Weeks were seriously injured.

== See also ==
- Shoeburyness
- Royal Artillery
- Thames Estuary
- Artillery

== Bibliography ==
Askwith, W.H. (1900). List of Officers of the Royal Regiment of Artillery from 1716-1899. Woolwich: Royal Artillery.

'Antony's visit to site of his family tragedy' Echo (Southend) 29 August 2014.

General Register Office, Death Indexes, http://www.freebmd.org.uk/

Glennie, D. (1948). Gunners’ Town. Civic Publications.

Ministry of Defence Shoeburyness - a timeline. Quinitiq.

Society of Genealogists, Essex monumental inscriptions, Volume 12, ES/M 27.

The Southend Standard, 27 February, 6 March and 13 March 1885.

St Andrew's church South Shoebury, burial register, Essex Record Office D/P 282/1/7.
