= Gunners Park and Shoebury Ranges =

Nature reserve in Essex, England

Coordinates: 51.523°N 0.785°E

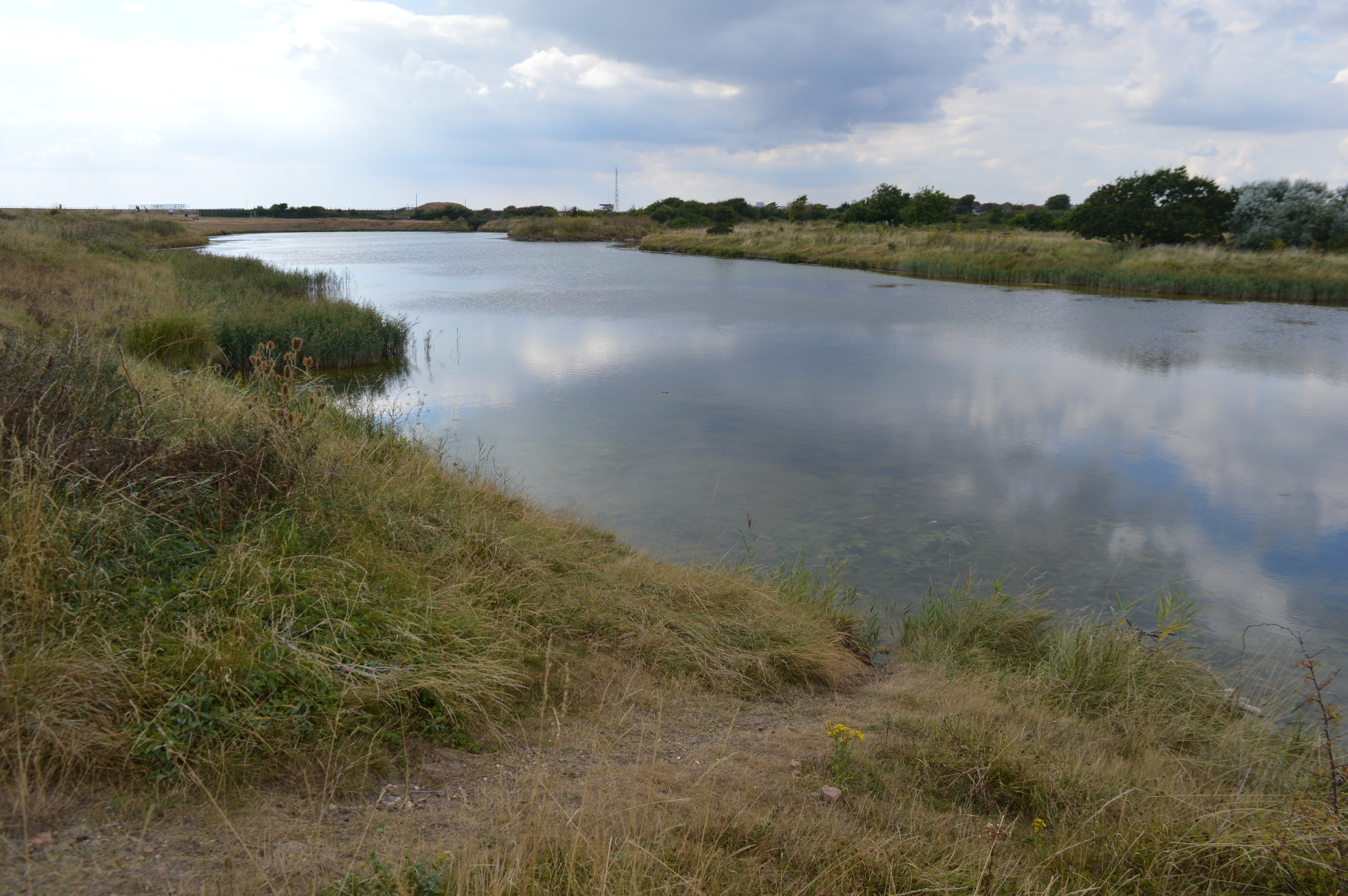
- Gunners Park lake
- Interactive map of Gunners Park and Shoebury Ranges
- Type: Nature reserve
- Location: Shoeburyness, Essex
- OS grid: TQ932841
- Area: 25 hectares (62 acres)
- Manager: Essex Wildlife Trust

Gunners Park and Shoebury Ranges is a 25 hectare nature reserve in Shoeburyness in Essex. It is managed by the Essex Wildlife Trust (EWT). Part of Gunners Park is Shoeburyness Old Ranges Local Nature Reserve (called Shoebury Ranges by the EWT), which is itself part of the Foulness Site of Special Scientific Interest. At the eastern end of Gunners Park is the Danish Camp, a Scheduled Monument.

Shoeburyness Old Ranges has flora unique in the county, on a habitat of unimproved grassland over ancient sand dunes. There are areas of grasses and sedges, while rushes are found in damp hollows. Rabbits graze the grassland, and close cropped areas have many lichens. (Note: The description of Shoeburyness Old Ranges is from the Foulness SSSI citation, where it is called Gunners Park. The rest of Gunners Park is not a Local Nature Reserve or Site of Special Scientific Interest.)

Gunners Park, which is named from its former military use, has over twelve habitats, including coastal grassland and ancient sand dunes. Rare insects include sandwich click beetles and cuckoo wasps, while there are unusual plants such as bulbous meadow-grass. There is a wide range of migrating birds. Danish Camp is an Iron Age fortified settlement which got its name because it was wrongly believed to have been built by the Danish Viking leader Haesten.

There is access from Ness Road, Mess Road, Magazine Road and Warrior Square Road. Shoeburyness Old Ranges is closed to the public. Parts of the site were formerly part of MoD Shoeburyness.
