= Shoeburyness High School =

School in Southend-on-Sea, Essex

Location
- Caulfield Road; Shoeburyness; Southend-on-Sea, Essex, SS3 9LL; England; 51.53291°N 0.77581°E

Information
- Type: Bilateral Academy
- Motto: Expect Excellence
- Local authority: Southend-on-Sea
- Department for Education URN: 137733 Tables
- Ofsted: Reports
- Head teacher: Teri-Leigh Jones
- Gender: Coeducational
- Age: 11 to 19
- Enrolment: 1770
- Website: shoeburyness.secat.co.uk

Shoeburyness High School is a coeducational secondary academy school in Southend-on-Sea, Essex. The school is larger than the average sized secondary academy, with almost 1800 students on roll. 275 of the enrolled students are in the sixth form. The school itself is on the Delaware Estate, having a back entrance on Delaware Rd and serves North Shoebury's other estates, collectively known as the 'Asda Estate'.

== History ==
Shoeburyness High School gained Technology College status in September 1999. As part of the plan, a CAD/CAM Centre was developed.

The school gained Leading Space Education School status in September 2008, and has since implemented a number of space-themed projects in Science, including the Year 8 Space Academy course and outreach work with local primary schools.

The school became an academy in December 2011.

The school is part of a local academy trust, SECAT, based at SECAT House, Caulfield Road, Shoeburyness.

== Academics ==
In Key Stage 3 pupils are taught Art, Design and Technology, Drama, English, French, Geography, History, ICT, Maths, Music, Physical Education, Religious Education, Science and SCOPE (PSHE). In Key Stage 4 pupils then study English, Maths and Science as their three core GCSE subjects and others which can be chosen as their options (GCSEs and BTECs are available).

The school has a Sixth Form with a curriculum including both A-Level and vocational courses. The Sixth Form offers a range of subjects including Business Studies, Film Studies, Performing Arts, Media Studies, History, Geography, English, Maths, Physics, Chemistry, Biology, IT, Music Technology among others.

== Demographics ==
In its 2013 report, Ofsted noted that the "majority of students are of White British heritage. A small proportion are from minority ethnic backgrounds." Additionally, they noted that "proportion of students supported by the pupil premium is above average. This additional funding is for students who are known to be eligible for free school meals, in local authority care, or from a family with a parent in the armed forces. The proportion of disabled students and those who have special educational needs supported at school action is below average, but the proportion supported at school action plus or through a statement of special educational needs is above average."

== Ofsted ==
Shoeburyness High School was regarded as "Good with outstanding features" by Ofsted in 2013. As of 2022, its most recent inspection was in 2017, when it was again judged Good.

== Controversy ==
In late 2019, rats were found at the school. Shoeburyness High School was featured in multiple national news outlets. The rats were spotted in toilets, and it is believed they were using the school as a feasting ground, picking up crumbs dropped by children during the day. There were also reports of odd smells around the school, as the school made an attempt to clear the air vents of the rats. It is believed that the rats remain there to this day.
