= Foulness SSSI =

Nature reserve in Essex, England

Coordinates: 51.581°N 0.937°E

Foulness
- Site of Special Scientific Interest
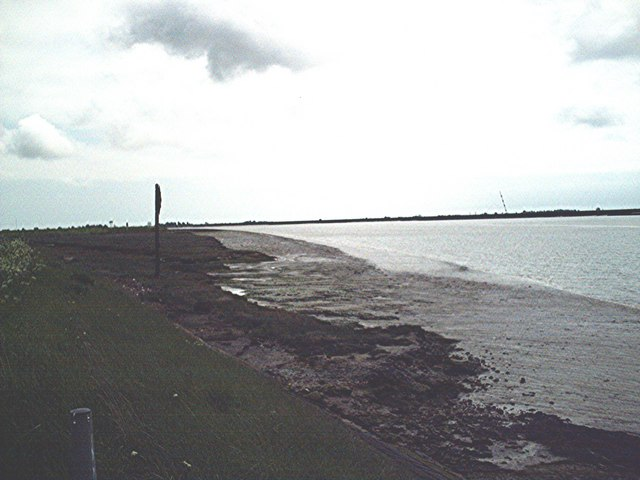
- View across the River Roach
- Location of Foulness.
- Area of search: Essex
- Grid reference: TR030905
- Interest: Biological
- Area: 10,702 ha (26,450 acres)
- Notification date: 1993
- Location map: Magic Map

Foulness SSSI is a 10,702 hectare biological Site of Special Scientific Interest covering the shoreline between Southend-on-Sea and the Crouch estuary in Essex.

== Site of Special Scientific Interest ==
It is a key site in A Nature Conservation Review, and is part of the Essex Estuaries Special Area of Conservation. It covers two Ramsar wetland sites of international importance, 'Crouch and Roach Estuaries' and 'Foulness'. An area of 6.4 hectares is Shoeburyness Old Ranges, a Local Nature Reserve managed by the Essex Wildlife Trust.

Most of the site is owned and managed by the Ministry of Defence. Natural England describes it as "extensive intertidal sand-silt flats, saltmarsh, beaches, grazing marshes, rough grass and scrubland". The flats are of international importance for nine species of wildfowl and waders, such as dark-bellied brent geese. Rare plants include soft hornwort and spiral tasselwood, and the site is also important for invertebrates, with 71 nationally rare species.
