= Danish Camp =

Archaeological site in Shoeburyness, Essex, England

Coordinates: 51.527°N 0.793°E

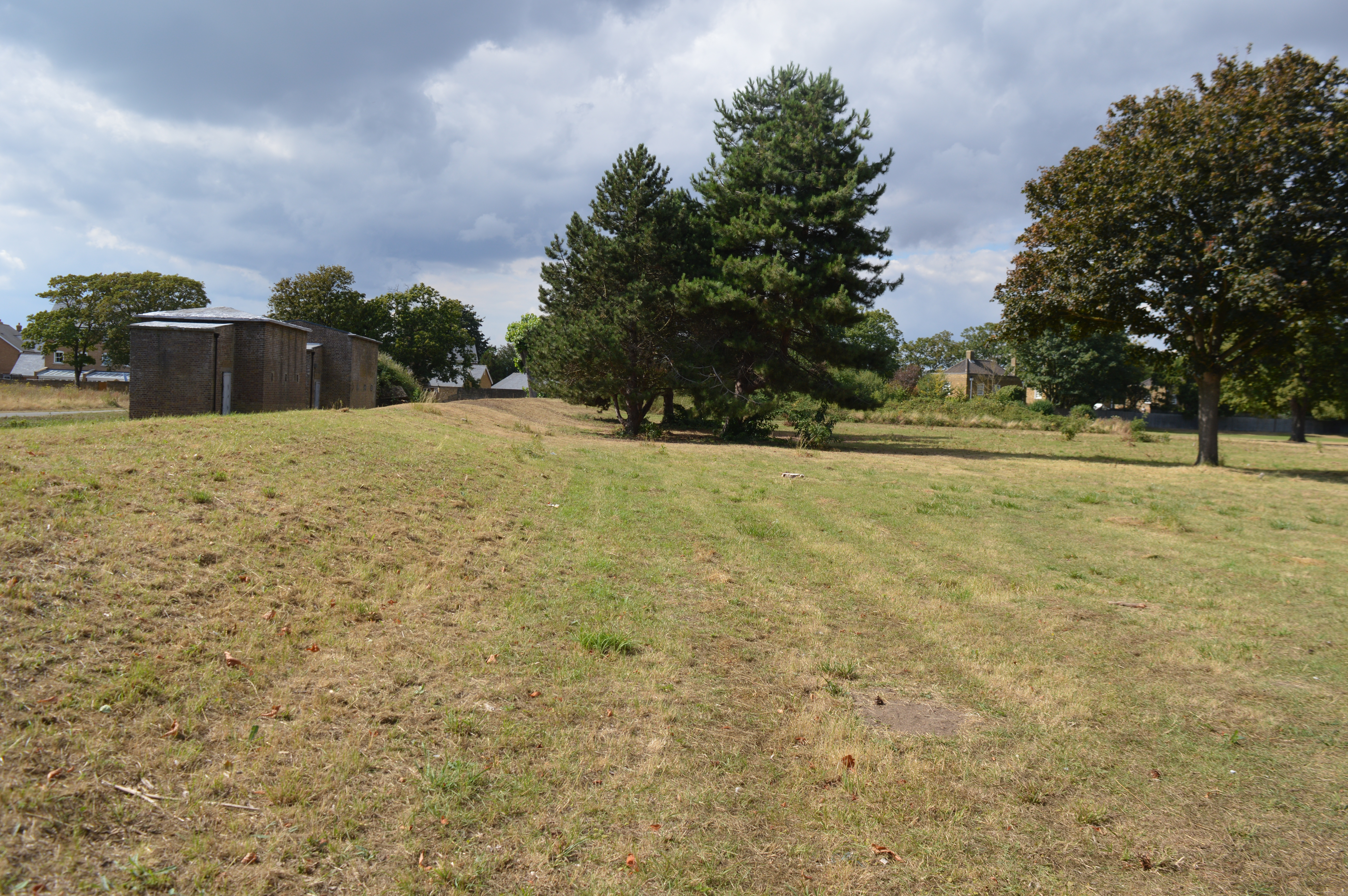
The Danish Camp at Shoeburyness on the Essex coast, with its southern bank on the left

Danish Camp is an Iron Age fortified settlement in Shoeburyness in Essex. It is a Scheduled Monument under the Ancient Monuments and Archaeological Areas Act 1979, list number 1017206. The site is in the Gunners Park and Shoebury Ranges nature reserve, which is managed by the Essex Wildlife Trust.

This site is classed by Natural England as a 'slight univallate hillfort'. There are two sections remaining of the defensive banks of the settlement. The surviving part of the north-western bank is around 80 metres long, and it has an average height of 2 metres and width of 11 metres. The southern bank is slightly lower. There was an external ditch, which is now largely filled. Pottery vessels have been found dating to the Middle Iron Age, around 400 to 200 years BC, together with four round houses and many post holes and pits. There is some evidence of earlier Mesolithic and Bronze Age occupation, but as this extends beyond the site it is thought to represent general utilisation of the area. The site was agricultural land until it was purchased by the Board of Ordnance in 1849, and some of the visible Iron Age remains were probably lost at that time, while other parts have been lost to coastal erosion. There is also evidence of Roman occupation in the south-west corner.

The site is called the Danish Camp because it was thought to have been constructed by the Danish Viking leader Hastein, who is reported by the Anglo-Saxon Chronicle to have built a fort at Shoebury in 894; though he might have re-used the existing camp, no evidence has been found of Viking occupation.

There is public access to the site, which is between Ness Road and Warrior Square Road.
