= MOD Shoeburyness =

Military installation

- Shoeburyness, Essex in England
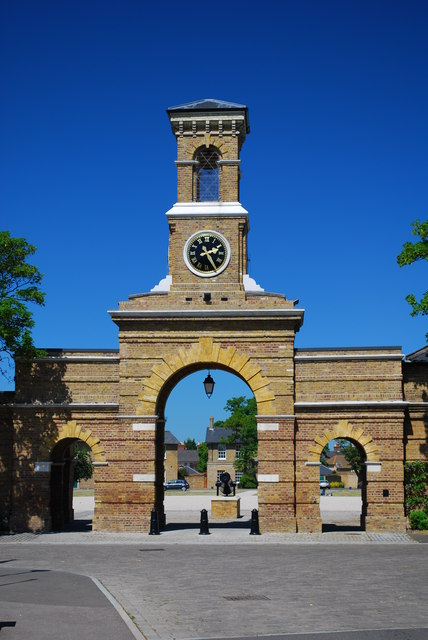
- Clock tower at Horseshoe Barracks, Shoeburyness

Site information
- Type: Firing Range; Testing Facility
- Owner: Ministry of Defence
- Operator: QinetiQ
- Open to the public: Yes

Location
- Shown within Essex MOD Shoeburyness (the United Kingdom)
- Coordinates: 51.53710°N 0.80741°E

Site history
- Built: 1849
- In use: 1849–present

MOD Shoeburyness is a Ministry of Defence installation, managed by QinetiQ, at Pig's Bay near Shoeburyness in Essex.

The site consists of a range covering a land area of 7,500 acres (3,000 ha) with 35,000 acres (14,000 ha) of tidal sands and 21 operational firing areas. MOD Shoeburyness is also a centre of excellence for environmental testing of ordnance, munitions and explosives. The Environmental Test Centre on site also simulates extreme environmental conditions to evaluate military vehicles and equipment.

MOD Shoeburyness has been a weapons testing site for more than 170 years.

== History ==
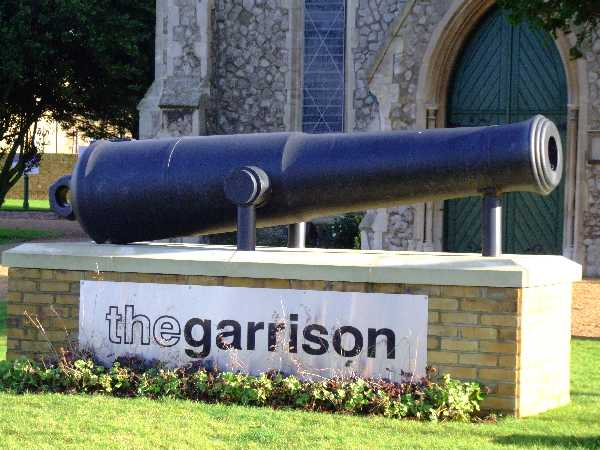
Cannon outside the Garrison Church of St Peter and St Paul, Horseshoe Barracks

In 1849, the Board of Ordnance purchased land at South Shoebury with a view to setting up an artillery testing and practice range (until then, Plumstead Common and Woolwich Common had been used, but these were no longer viable due to the increasing power and range of the weapons.)

=== The 'Old Ranges' ===
Initially, the range was only used in the summer, but its use grew significantly during the Crimean War and from 1854 it was established as a permanent station. The officers' mess was set up in a former Coastguard station on what is now Mess Road, facing the sea; officers were accommodated in the terrace of coastguard cottages, to which a library and dining room were added in 1852. A simple 'hut barracks' was also built on the seafront, to the north-east (on what is now Parade Walk); and in 1856 a garrison hospital was established nearby. The ranges and practice areas were laid out to the west.

=== RA School of Gunnery ===
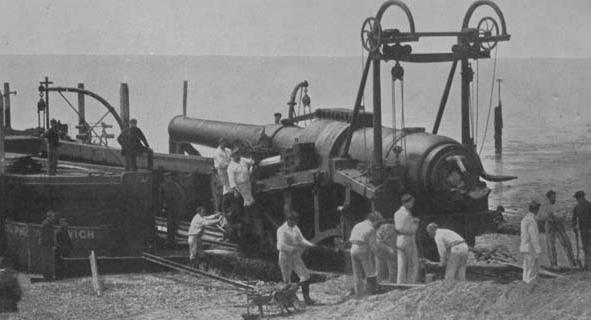
Delivery by barge of an Armstrong 110-ton gun to the Old Ranges in 1888

In the wake of the Crimean War, the Royal Artillery School of Gunnery was established at Shoeburyness in 1859 'for individual improvement as well as for the advancement of artillery science in general'. Horseshoe Barracks and various other amenities were added not long afterwards and the site was extended to cover some 200 acres lying between Ness Road and the coast.

Over the years that followed Shoeburyness was integral to the development of new and improved artillery weapons. Alongside its use as a training facility, the ranges were used for experimental trials of guns, rockets and explosives and for the testing of armour and defensive works. As the scale of these experiments began to outgrow the site, its gun emplacements were adapted for seaward firing and it later specialized in coastal artillery training.

A branch of the School was opened in Woolwich, in the 1870s, which took over the training of Militia and Volunteer Artillery (with a view to ensuring a standardisation of training across both the Reserve and the Regular forces).

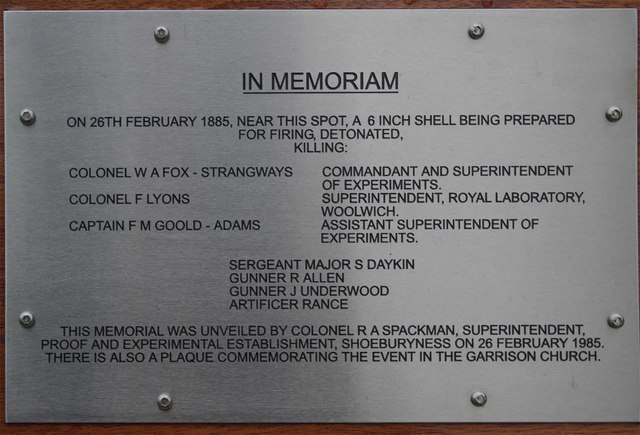
Memorial plaque unveiled in 1985

An accidental explosion in February 1885 killed seven Royal Artillery personnel including the Commandant and his deputy.

After 1889, experimentation and testing was progressively moved on to 'New Ranges' to the north-east, but the 'Old Ranges' remained in active use as a training area.

=== The 'New Ranges' ===
As early as 1865 the Ordnance Select Committee was recommending the purchase of additional land at Shoeburyness, to accommodate the increasing power and range of artillery then in development. In due course land was acquired to the north-east, and from 1889 the establishment expanded on to a 'New Range', which encompassed Foulness and Havengore.

=== Proof and Experimental Establishment ===
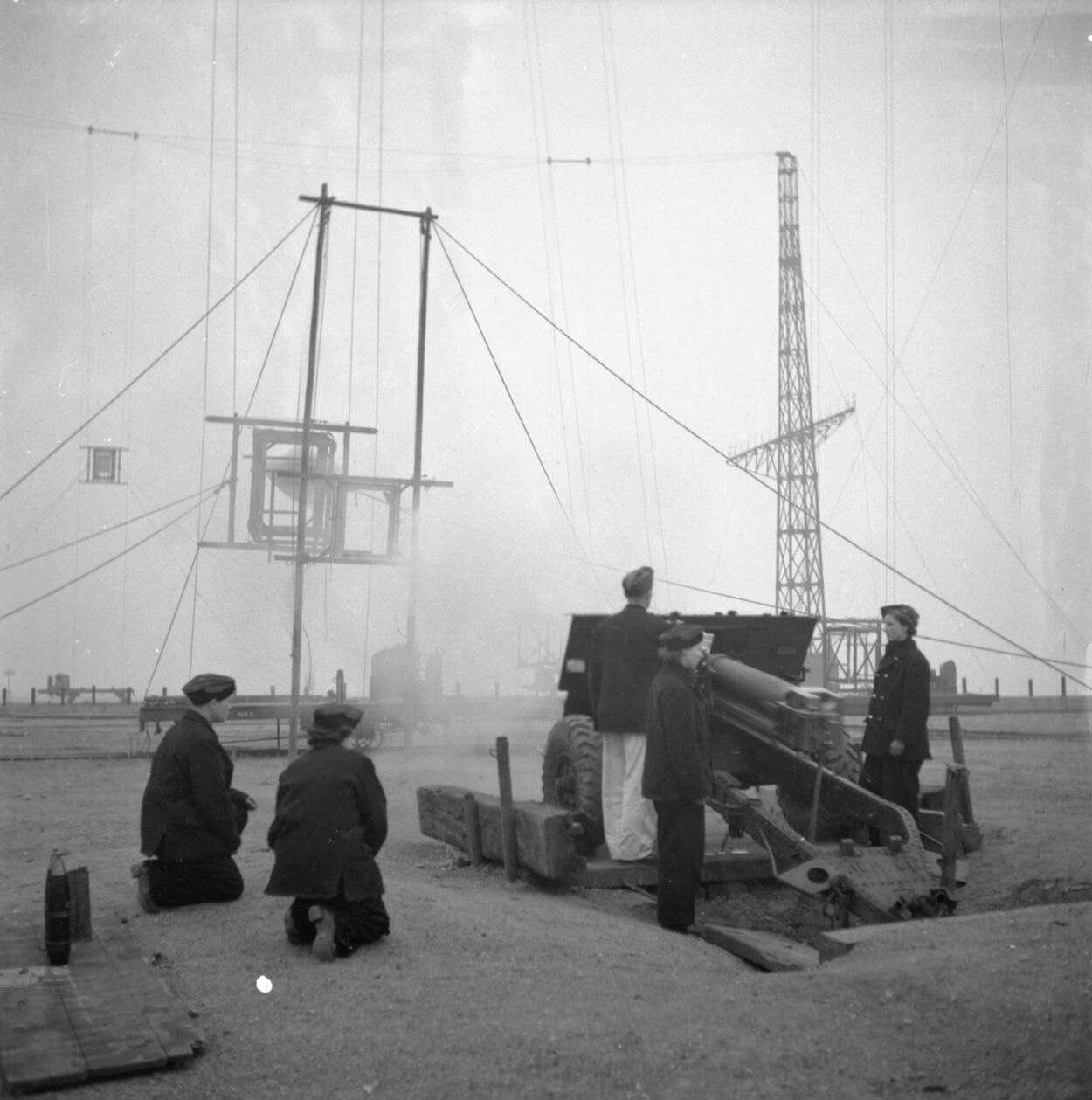
Experimental firing of an Ordnance QF 25-pounder gun by women of the ATS in 1943; the shell is fired through apparatus that measures its velocity

The Experimental Branch (part of the School of Gunnery since 1859) became an independent operation in 1905 (it was renamed the Experimental Establishment in 1920, and the Proof and Experimental Establishment (P&EE) in 1948, before becoming part of the Defence Test and Evaluation Organisation (DTEO) in 1995).

=== The Coast Artillery School ===
In 1920 the School of Gunnery was redesignated as the 'Coast Artillery School' of the Royal Garrison Artillery, following the move of the Field Artillery and Horse Artillery equivalents to a new establishment (the School of Instruction for Royal Horse and Field Artillery) at Larkhill. In 1940 the Coast Artillery School was moved from Shoebury to Great Orme, Llandudno, where it remained for the rest of the Second World War, before relocating to Plymouth.

=== Shoebury Garrison ===
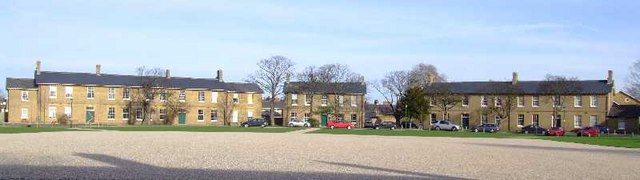
Horseshoe Barracks, now converted for use as private housing

After the war, artillery and other regiments continued to be garrisoned at Shoebury until 1976 when the garrison headquarters closed. At the same time, the number of military personnel on the staff of the P&EE was reduced, especially in the 1980s, as civilian contractors increasingly took over the running of the Establishment.

Following the closure of the Old Ranges in 1998 the old garrison land and buildings were sold and converted for housing. The New Ranges remain in use, however; the work of the Experimental Establishment, begun in 1859, continues today under the auspices of Qinetiq. The site is known as MOD Shoeburyness.

=== Listed buildings ===
Several buildings and structures on the site are listed, including the cart and wagon shed, which is used as a heritage and community centre; together they are described by Historic England as constituting "a complete mid-19th century barracks". As of 2016 many of these have been refurbished for sale as private houses, and additional housing is being built in the vicinity. A tower was planned to stand in the Shoeburyness Garrison housing development. The tower was to be 18 storeys high and designed to mark the start of the Thames Gateway development.

==== Gallery ====
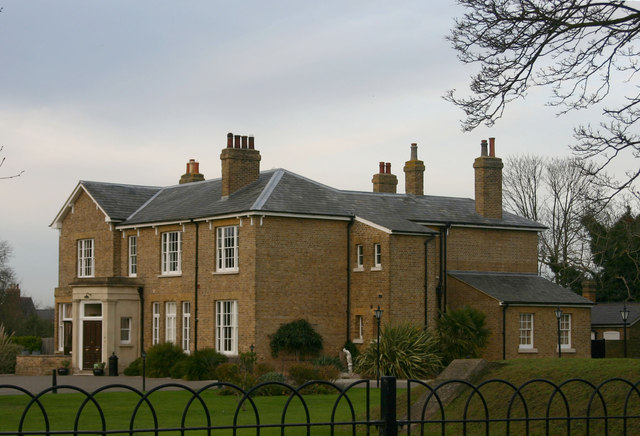
Commandant's House (1851)

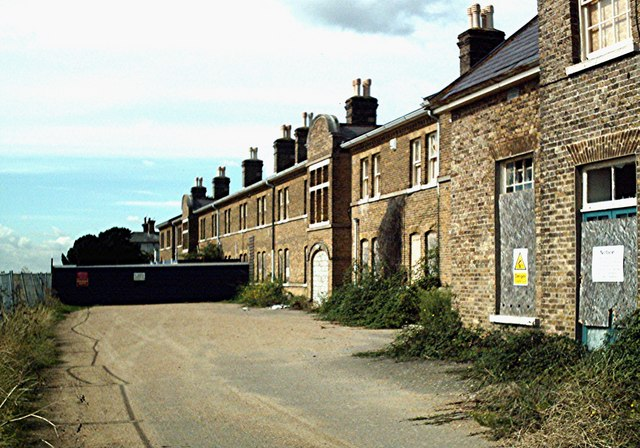
Accommodation range (1898) linked to Officers' Mess (1852), Mess Road

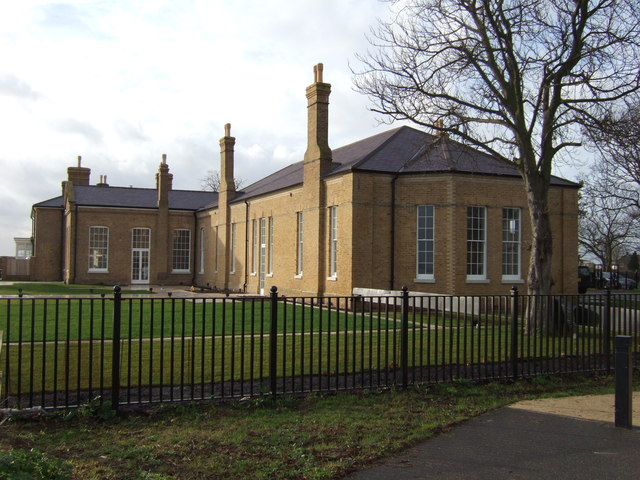
Officers' Mess: dining room (1852, extended 1898)

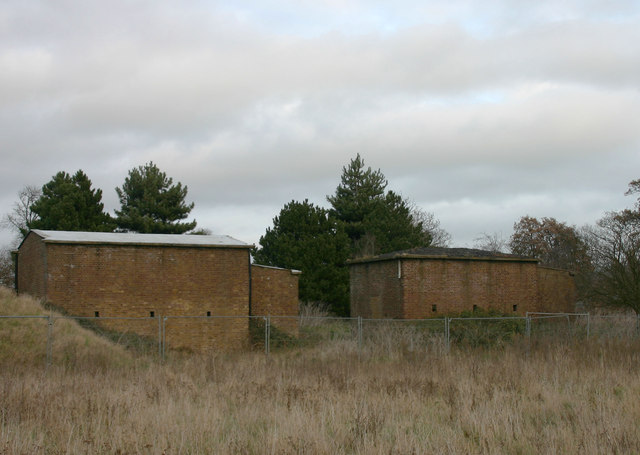
Powder Magazines (1852–3)

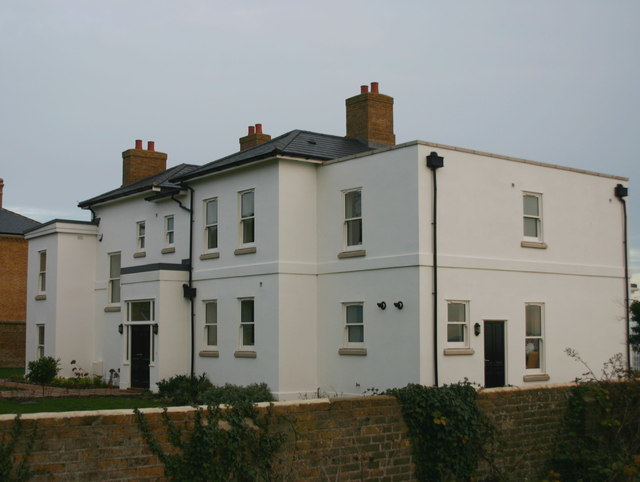
Beach House, Mess Road (1856); built for the second-in-command

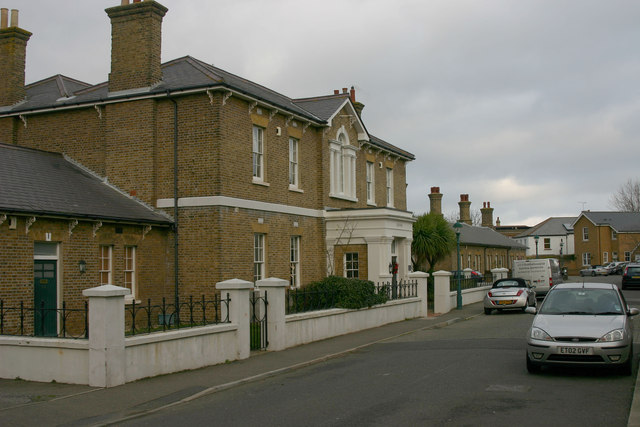
Garrison Hospital, Hospital Road (1856)

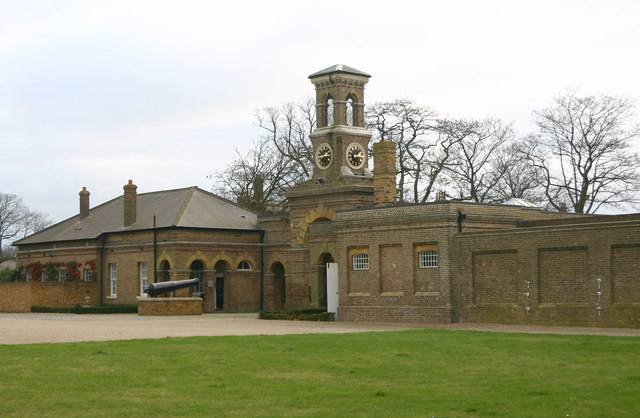
Offices and Guard House flanking the clock tower (1856)

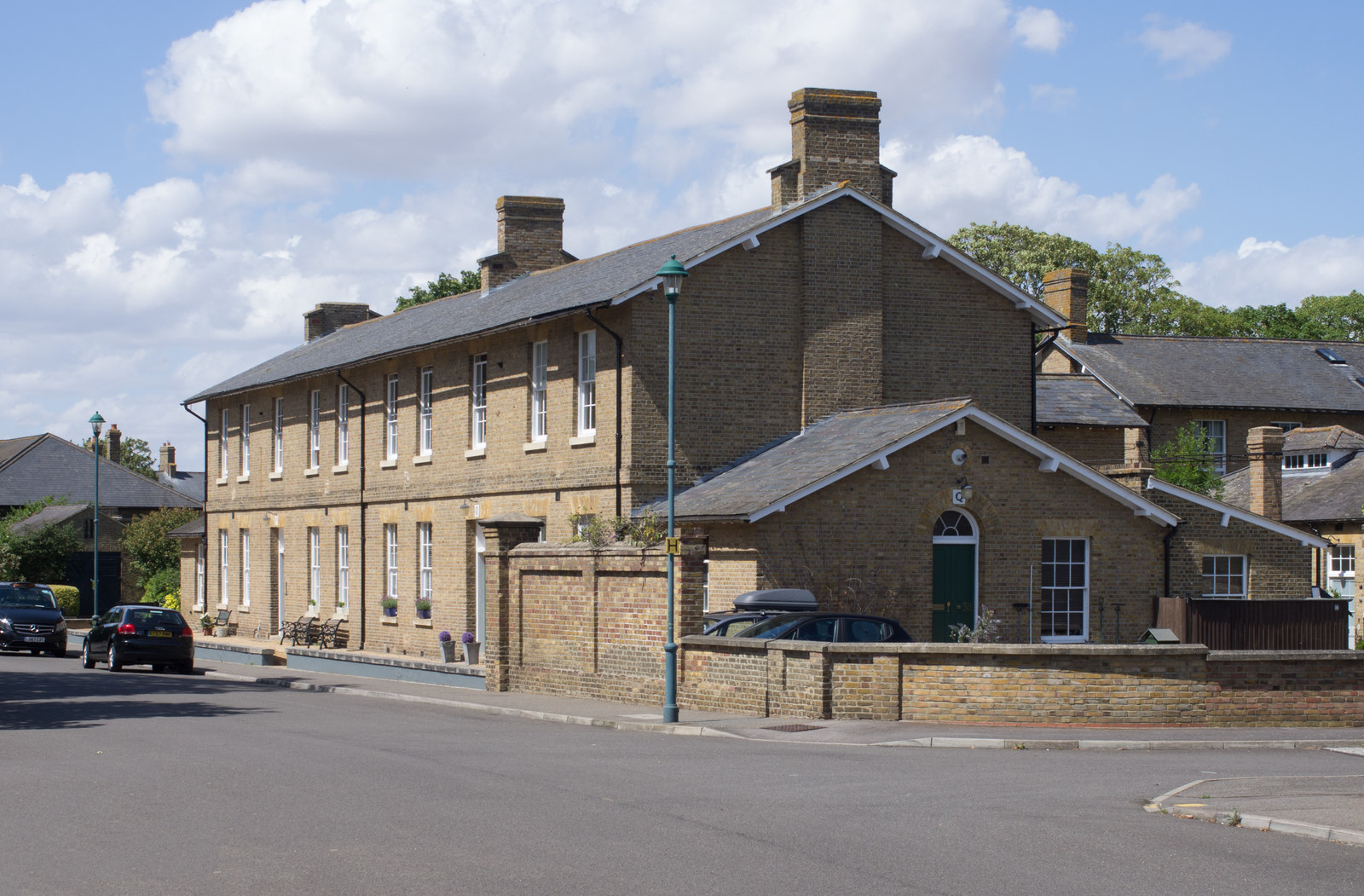
One of the eight barracks blocks around Horseshoe Crescent (1859)

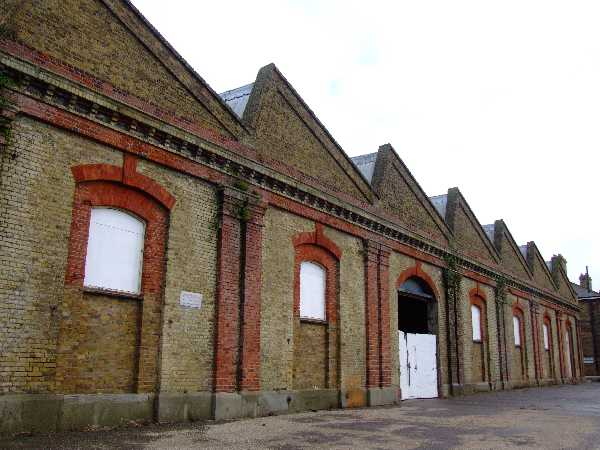
Gunnery drill shed, Chapel Road (1859)

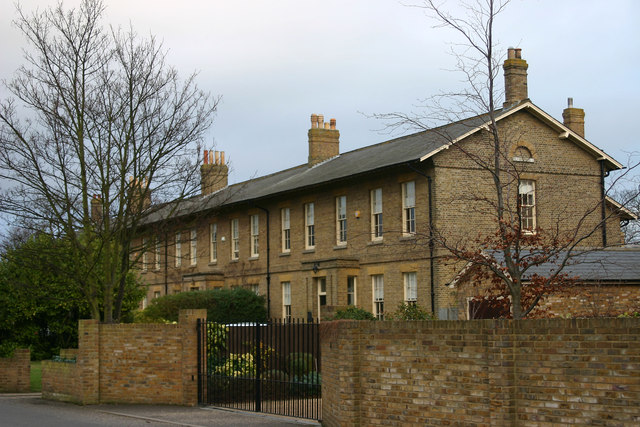
Single Officers' Quarters, Warrior Square Road (1860)

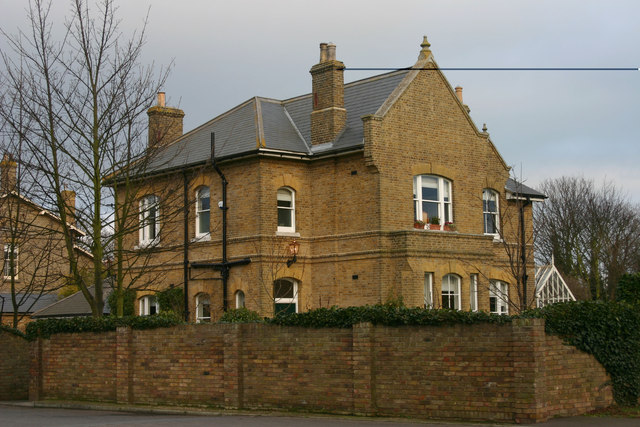
Clerk of Works House, Warrior Square Road (1861)

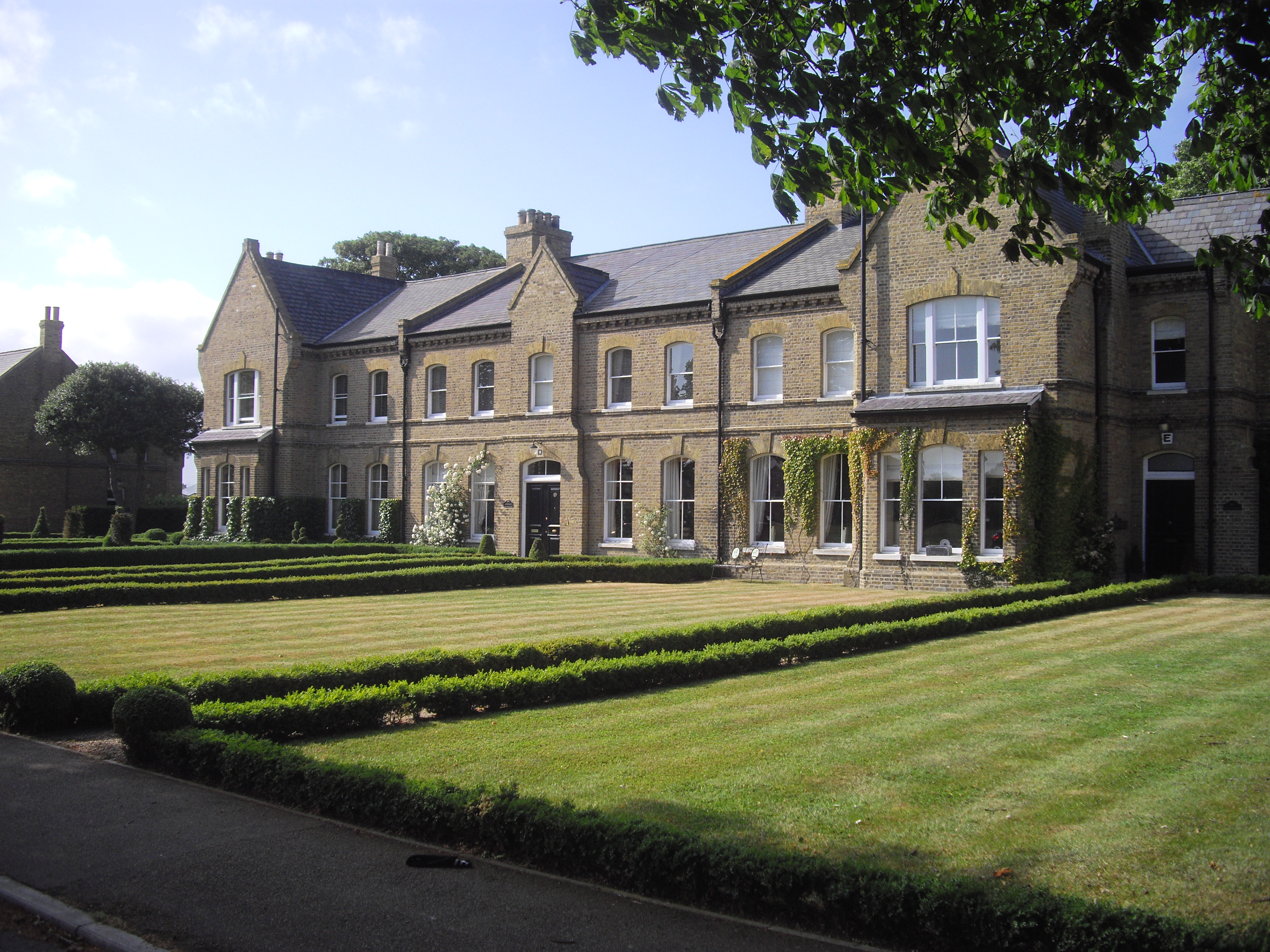
Married Officers' Quarters, The Terrace (1861–2)

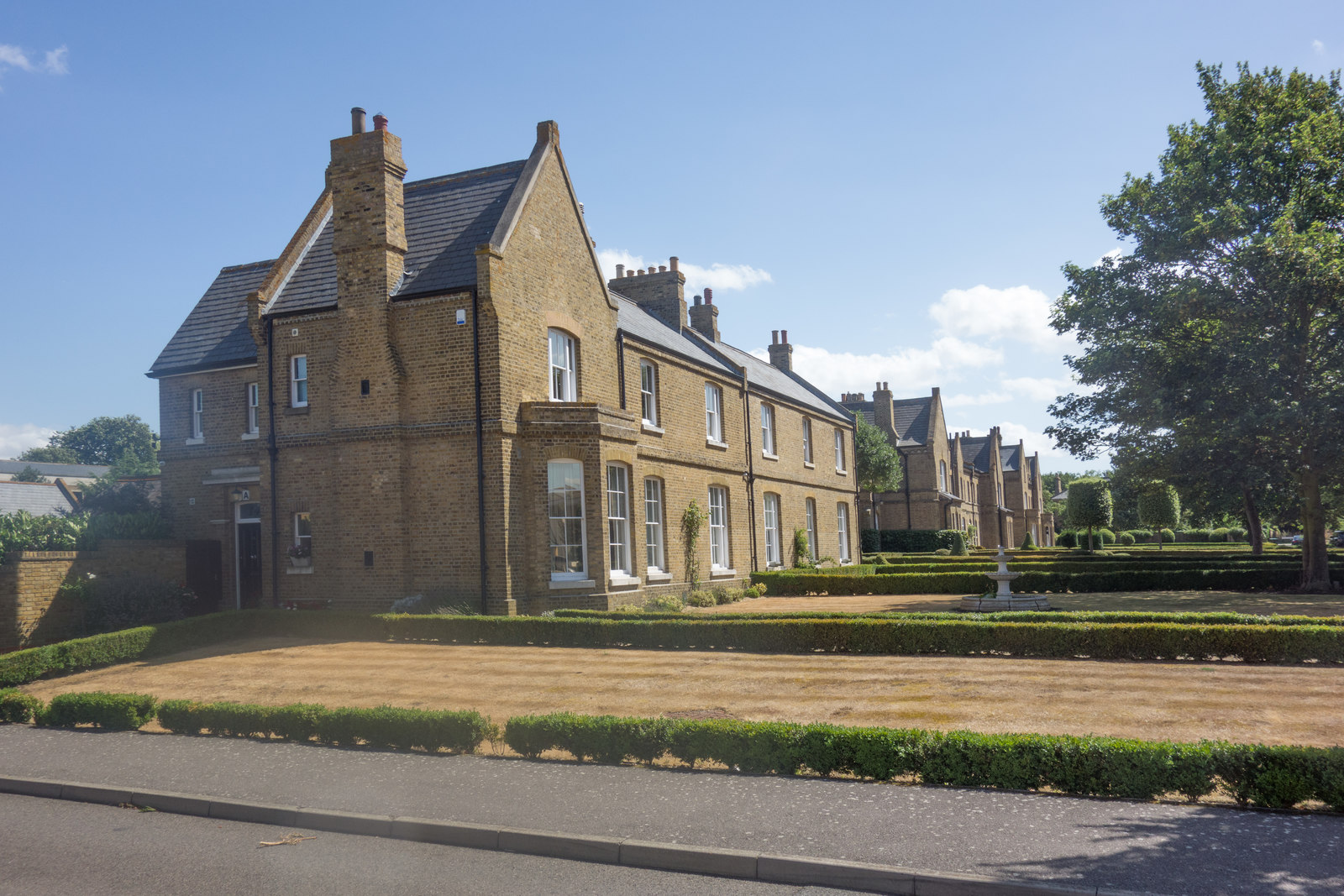
Surgeon's House, The Terrace (1861–2; with Instructor's House added in 1871)

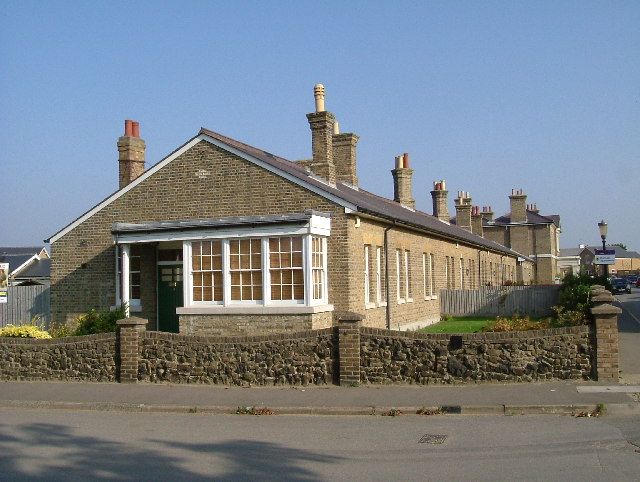
Sergeants' accommodation, Hospital Road (1861)

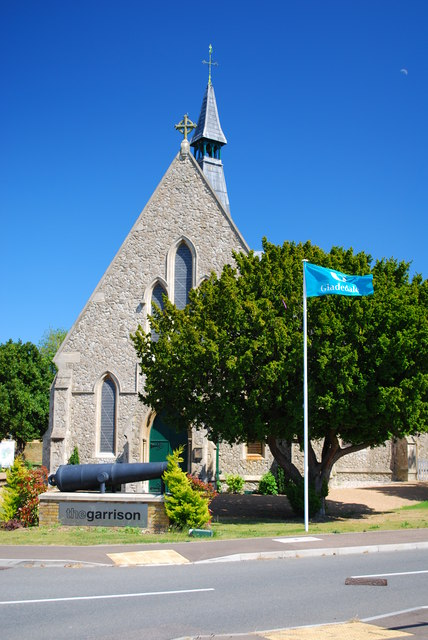
Garrison Church of St Peter and St Paul (1866)

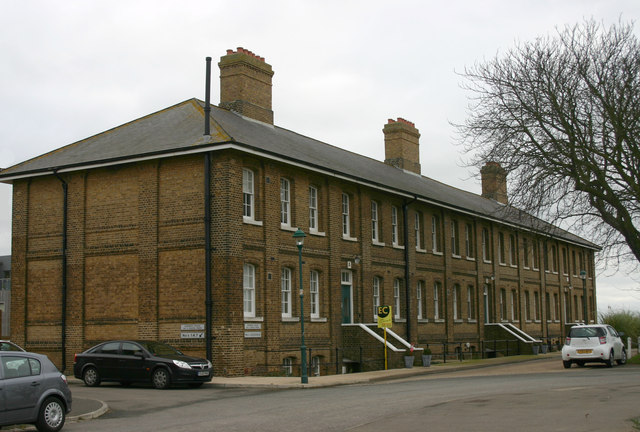
Long Course Officers' Quarters, Chapel Road (1871)

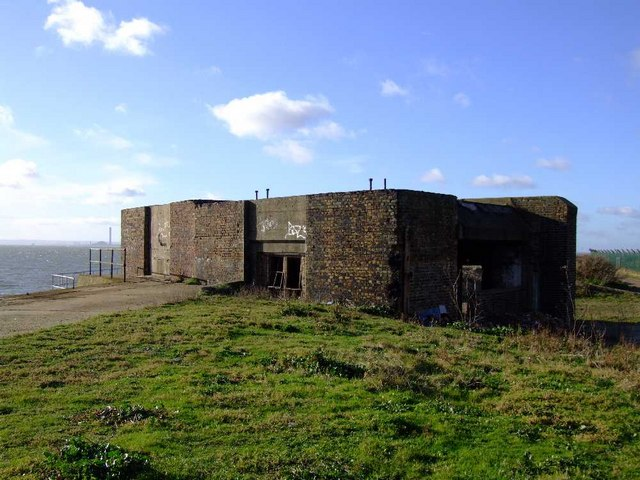
Light Quick Firing Battery (1872)

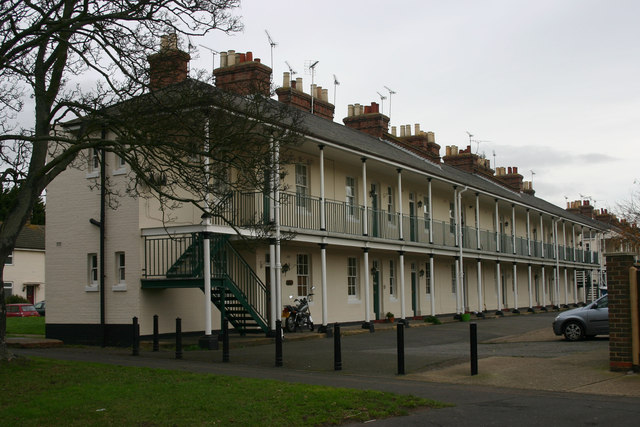
Sergeants' Married Quarters, Thorpe Green Mews (1886)

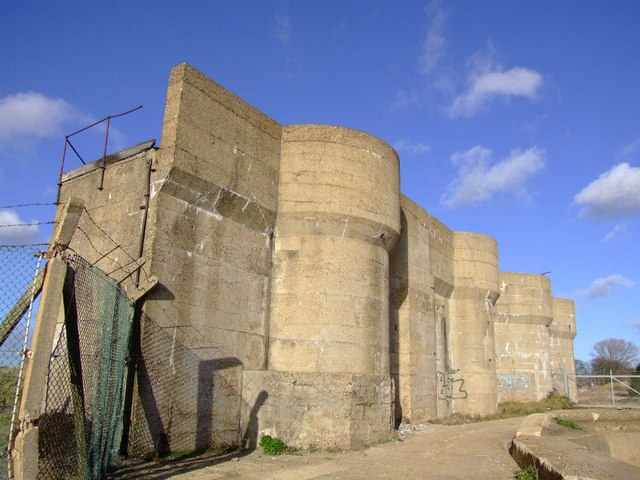
Heavy Quick Firing Battery (1898)

== Present-day use ==
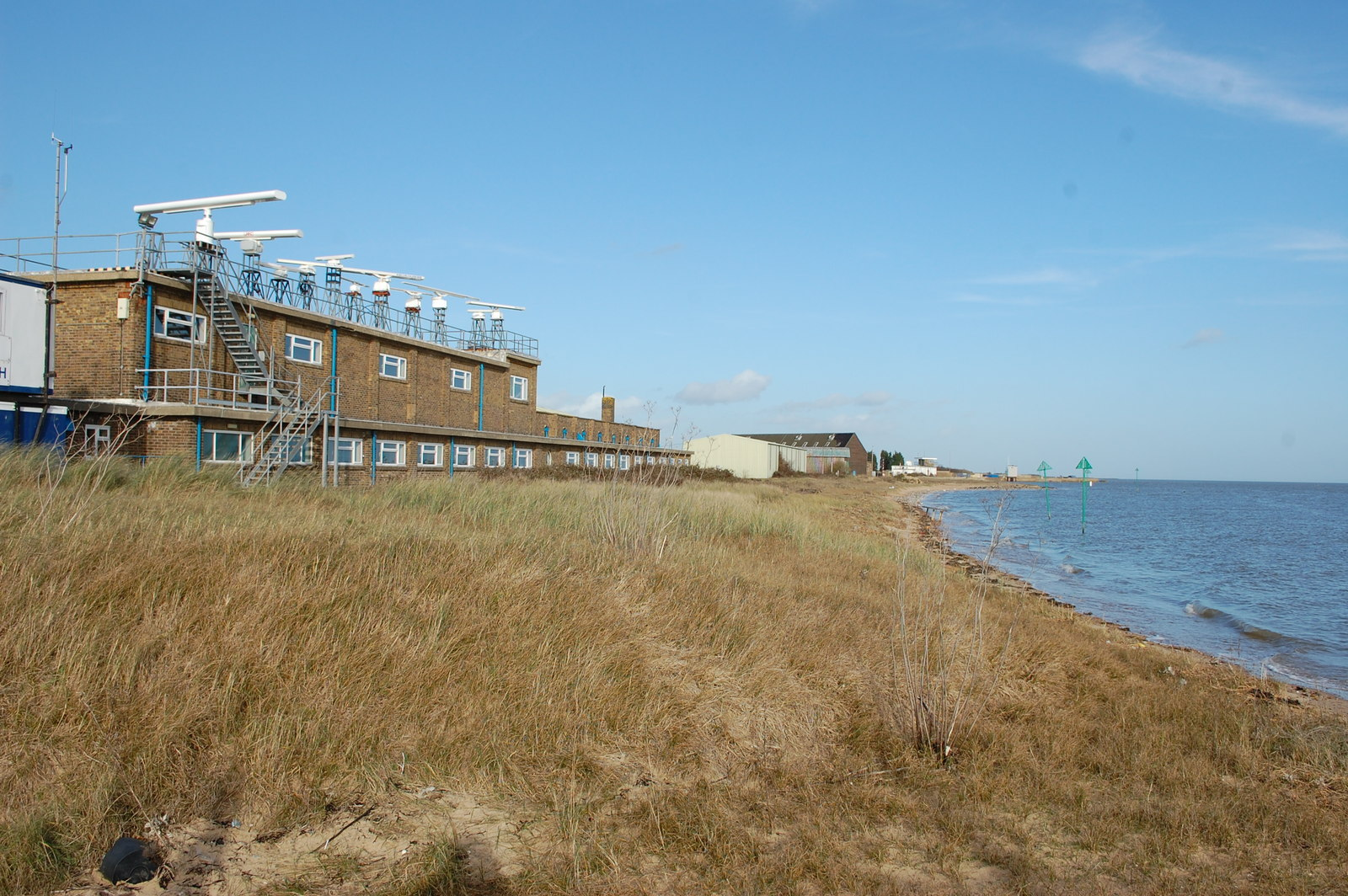
MOD buildings, Shoeburyness, 2014

=== MOD Shoeburyness ===
QinetiQ manages the site on behalf of the Ministry of Defence, employing around 300 people.

The site provides a closed and controlled environment for testing weapons systems at various stages of development, for safe disposal of expired ammunition and for live-ammunition training in Explosive Ordnance Disposal techniques. The Environmental Test Centre evaluates live munitions when exposed to different environments and climates. It is the largest UK environmental test facility for Ordnance, Munitions and Explosives (OME).

==== Environmental Test Centre ====
Extreme environmental conditions are simulated in two insulated chambers on site, with the capacity to test systems such as "aircraft, trains, trucks, main battle tanks, boats, helicopters, commercial vehicles, generators, communications equipment and test rigs."

These facilities also allow assessment of human performance in extreme environmental conditions, effectiveness of protective clothing and equipment, and research to understand the thermal stress associated with worn and carried equipment.

The centre offers the following services:

- Climatic
  - High Temperature (maximum +100°C)
  - Low Temperature (minimum -60°C)
  - Humidity (+10° to + 80°C and 10%RH to 98%RH)
  - Low Pressure (minimum 3.4kPA)
  - Water – mist, rain, immersion (max simulated depth 65m)
  - Icing
  - Salt Mist
  - Fluid Contamination (maximum +80°C)
  - Thermal Shock (maximum +80°C and minimum -60°C)
  - Rapid Decompression (minimum pressure 3.4kPa)
  - Temperature / Low Pressure (+80°C to -60°C and minimum pressure 3.4kPa)
- Dynamic
  - Vibration (single shaker, twin shakers and multi-axis shakers)
  - Shock (free fall)
  - Impact (vertical and horizontal) Bounce
- Non-Destructive Testing
  - Computed Radiography (including mobile X-Ray)
  - X-Ray Computed Tomography
  - Digital Radiography

=== Shoeburyness Range ===
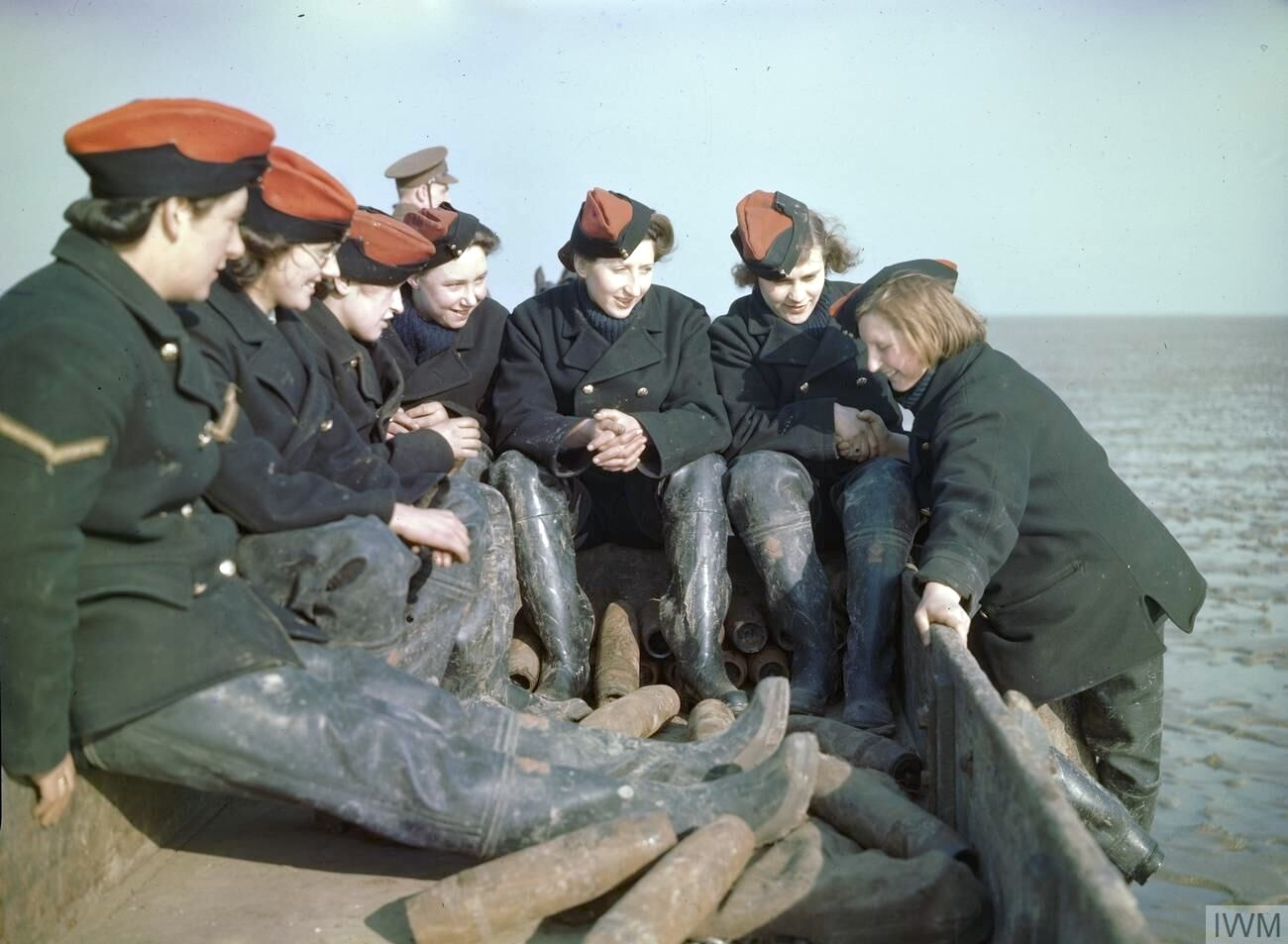
Women of the Auxiliary Territorial Service recovering shells from the Shoeburyness mud flats at low tide during World War II.

The range covers a land area of 7,500 acres (3,000 ha) with 35,000 acres (14,000 ha) of tidal sands and has 21 operational firing areas. Its unique terrain enables the over-water recovery of munitions up to a range of 22 km (14 mi), ground-to-ground firings of up to 27 km (17 mi) and long-range direct fire up to 3.5 km (2.2 mi).

The range is active Monday to Friday (occasionally at weekends), all year round, conducting activities that involve firing and detonating live ammunition, often over long distances, out to sea.

In 2013, there was an explosion at Shoeburyness resulting in four weapons testers being rescued from a bunker.

In 2024, Southend-on-Sea Coastguard said they had been observing increasing levels of families with small children trespassing on the prohibited MOD beaches. QinetiQ said it would use an amphibious vehicle to patrol the area and that anyone encountered by the patrols would be asked to leave.

== Sources ==
- Glennie, D (1948). Gunners' Town. Civic Publications.
