= Shoeburyness =

Suburb of Southend-on-Sea, Essex, England

Coordinates: 51.5316°N 0.7978°E

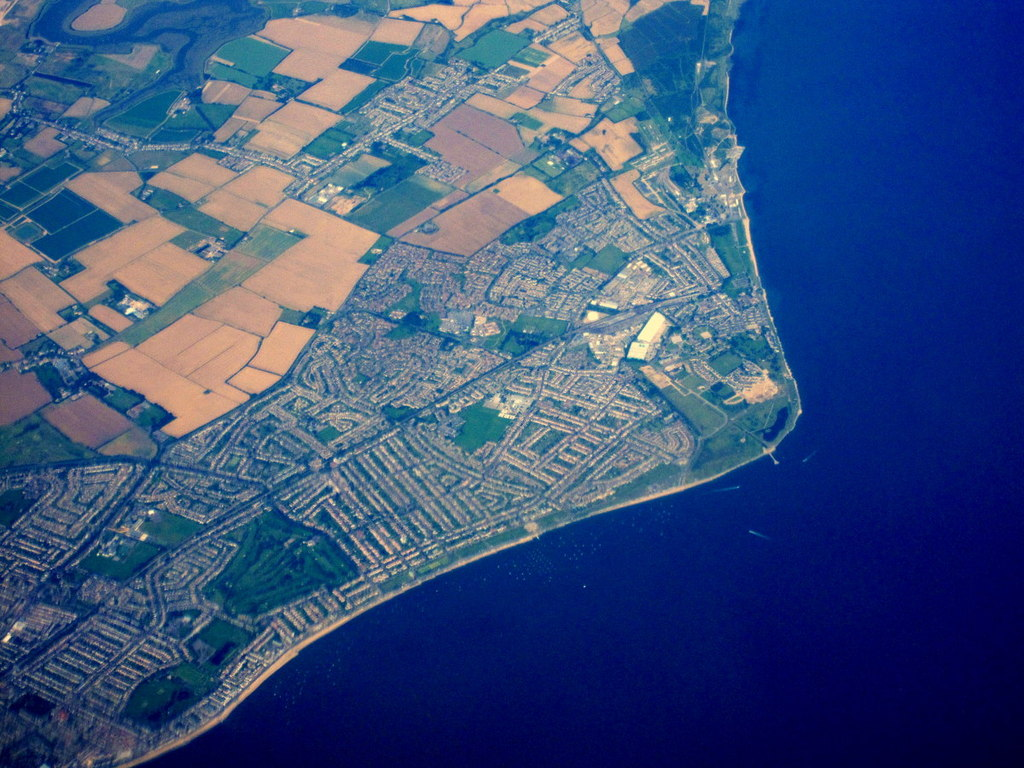
- Shoeburyness from the air

- Location within Essex
- Population: 22,275 (2018 mid-census)
- OS grid reference: TQ941851
- Unitary authority: Southend-on-Sea
- Ceremonial county: Essex
- Region: East
- Country: England
- Sovereign state: United Kingdom
- Post town: SOUTHEND-ON-SEA
- Postcode district: SS3
- Dialling code: 01702
- Police: Essex
- Fire: Essex
- Ambulance: East of England
- UK Parliament: Southend East and Rochford

Shoeburyness (/ˌʃuːbriˈnɛs/ SHOO-bree-NESS), or simply Shoebury, is a coastal town in the City of Southend-on-Sea, in the ceremonial county of Essex, England; it lies 3 miles (5 km) east of the city centre. It was formerly a separate town until it was absorbed into Southend in 1933.

In Saxon times, the area was called Shoebury. Sometime between 1086 and the thirteenth century, it was divided into two parishes: North Shoebury and South Shoebury. The two villages remained small rural settlements until the 1850s, when a barracks was established in the parish of South Shoebury, later becoming MoD Shoeburyness. A garrison town, known as Shoeburyness, grew around the barracks, taking its name from the ness on the coast at the southern end of the parish. Shoeburyness railway station opened in 1884, as the eastern terminus of the London, Tilbury and Southend Railway.

The parish of South Shoebury was made an urban district in 1894, which was renamed Shoeburyness in 1895. The urban district of Shoeburyness and parish of North Shoebury were both abolished in 1933, being absorbed into the county borough of Southend-on-Sea. Development during the twentieth century saw the formerly separate settlements of Shoeburyness and North Shoebury absorbed into the built-up area of Southend.

== History ==
The first record of occupation in Shoebury has been found from the Mesolithic period, with Neolithic and Bronze Age stone tools and Beaker pottery having also been discovered. An Iron Age settlement, now a Scheduled Monument, has been found, that had ramparts that were believed to be originally 40 feet (12 m) wide and 12 feet (3.7 m) tall, with evidence of round houses, ditches and postholes. The Romans built a fortified settlement called Essobira at the Ness, that was attacked by the British in AD50 under Caratacus and later by Boudica's rebels. Evidence of Essobira has not been found, however a Roman Kiln was found in 1892, 300 yards from Suttons, a historical house. A further Roman kiln was found in the grounds of the garrison in 1895.

The Saxons re-established a settlement in the 6th century, which at this point that the name Shoebury, or in Anglo-Saxon Scobrih, or in Danish, Scabivig was first documented. A Camp was built by the Dane Hastein in circa 894, but little remains as the Artillery Barracks were built over part of the site. Shoebury (North and South were recorded as one) was listed in the Domesday Book of 1086, having a population of 33 households and sitting within the control of the Rochford Hundred. The land was owned by three different people, Walter; Bishop Odo of Bayeux and the Swein of Essex, son of Robert FitzWimarc.

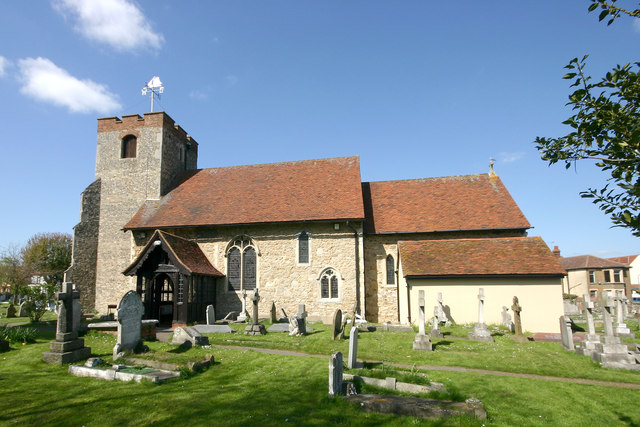
St Andrew’s Church, south elevation

The parish church of South Shoebury, St. Andrew was originally constructed in the 12th century under the control of Prittlewell Priory, with the West Tower being added in the 15th century and the South porch in the 16th century. The church was restored during the 19th century by renowned architect Sir Charles Nicholson. The manor house, known as South Shoebury Hall, is a medieval timber-framed house with an 18th-century brick frontage and other alterations. Other historical properties include Suttons, a Grade II listed manor house that was built in 1681, which is now on the most endangered list of Historic England. South Shoebury has also been called under is parish name of Shoebury Magna (in Latin Magna Shoberi) or Greater Shoebury.

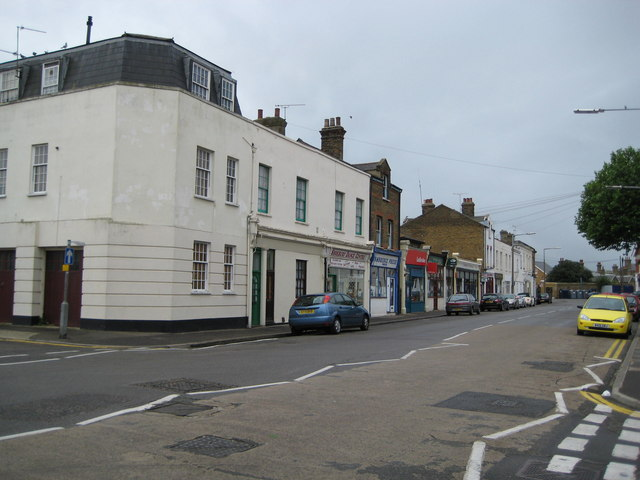
Shoebury High Street

South Shoebury was prone to flooding and Marsh fever, and in 1530 the parish had to sell St Andrew's bells to pay for repairs to the sea defences. Shoebury Common first appeared as The Great Marsh on a map in 1687, and in 1899 the land owner, Colonel Burges handed the Common to the Shoeburyness Urban District Council for the recreation and benefit of the inhabitants of South Shoebury and others.

By 1851, the population of South Shoebury stood at 158, but just ten years later the census had shown the population had grown to 1,502. The growth in population was caused by the opening of nearby brickfields by the Knapping family, and the construction of the Artillery Barracks that was the start of Shoebury Garrison. Prior to the Garrison's arrival the land had been home to several warrens, after the Normans had introduced rabbits to the area. In comparison, North Shoebury's population in 1894 was just 184. The village of South Shoebury had been built up around the High Street and Rampart Street, but it was not until the 1920s and 1930s that the town grew, with the area known as Cambridge Town being established. The area was named after a local public house called the Duke of Cambridge. The town was described by the military historian Patrick Barry as

a dreary place... the broadest and most sterile foreshore perhaps in England

It was home to the last recorded case of indigenous malaria in the British Isles during the 1930s.

The brickfields use to run two narrow railways, that crossed the High Street without a level crossing, to transfer their goods to Thames Barges at East Beach, which took the bricks to London, which up to World War II brought refuse back that was used to power the brick kilns, pumping out nasty fumes. In 1866, the Gas Light & Coke Company built a gas works to supply the Garrison, which a private company was then formed to manage the supply to Shoeburyness, which subsequently was taken over by Shoeburyness Urban District Council. The council was created in 1894, separating the civil and ecclesiastical side of the parish, until it was absorbed into Southend Borough in 1933 which also absorbed the former North Shoebury parish.

In between the two World Wars, Shoeburyness became a popular holiday resort, with a blacksmiths sitting next to the beach until the 1930s being a regular source of entertainment. In 1928, the Southend Recorder reported that tents stretched from the Common to Thorpe Hall Avenue, while in the same year local landmark Uncle Toms Cabin was built on the Common.

At the beginning of the Second World War, the depositing of a magnetic ground mine in the mud at the mouth of the Thames by the Luftwaffe was observed at Shoeburyness. Various sinkings of ships near the English coast in the preceding months were thought by many to be due to U-boat torpedoes, though the Admiralty suspected magnetic mines were being used. The heroic recovery of an intact mine on 23 November 1939, by Lieutenant Commanders Ouvry and Lewis from HMS Vernon made it possible for the Navy to study it and devise countermeasures to neutralise it; among these were the degaussing cables installed in merchant ships in Allied and British fleets, and, of course, wooden minesweepers. East Beach is the site of a defence boom, built in 1944, to prevent enemy shipping and submarines from accessing the River Thames. This replaced an earlier, similar boom built 100 yards (91 m) east.

After the war, artillery and other regiments continued to be garrisoned at Shoebury until 1976 when the garrison headquarters closed.

Up and to the early 1980s, the Shoeburys were still two distinct villages, separated by farm land. During the 1970s, a study by Southend Borough Council identified a lack of retail availability in the east of the borough. North Shoebury was identified as the site, with a supermarket of 50,000 square feet planned at its centre. Before any development took place, Essex County Council Archaeology Section of the Planning Department and Southend Museum started the North Shoebury Project in 1980 under the guidance of John Wymer, whose digs established that the area had continuous human habitation from the Mesolithic period. The planned store became an Asda supermarket, which opened in 1981, while one of the former farm barns became the Parsons Barn public house. This was joined by the Bishopsteignton housing development, that was completed between 1981 and 1988. The site was the former farm of listed building, the White House, which had been sold in 1919 to Southend Estates Company. Following the closure of the Old Ranges in 1998 the old garrison land and buildings were sold, and in 2000 redevelopment of the site to housing started. In 2022, a heritage centre was opened on the former garrison after 35 years of campaigning.

== Description ==
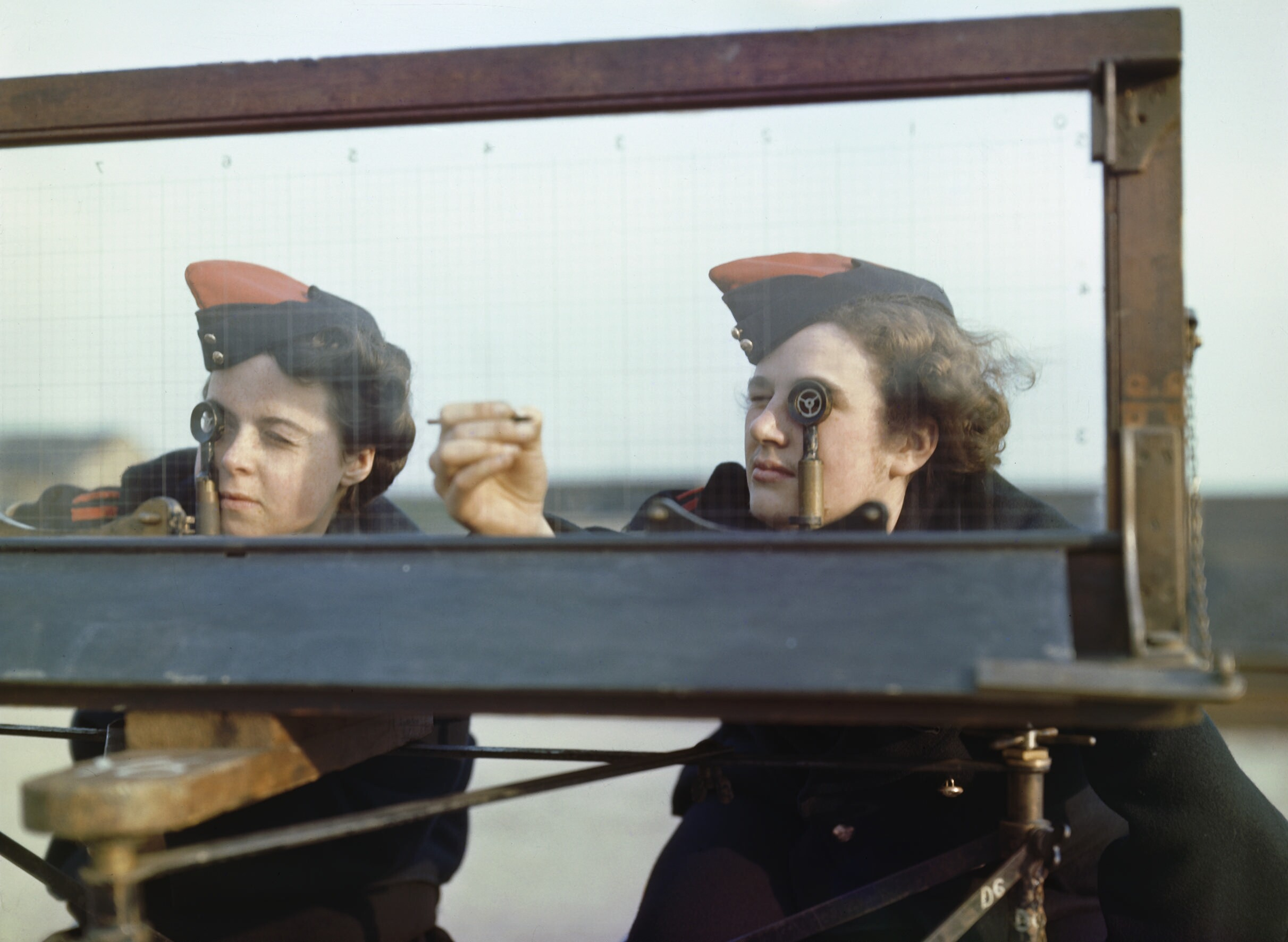
Auxiliary Territorial Service (ATS) personnel at the Royal Artillery Experimental Unit, at Shoeburyness, using the Window Position Finder to sight shell bursts in the air or water, 1943.

Shoeburyness sits on the Thames Estuary and is at the far east of the district of Southend-on-Sea, bordered to the west by Thorpe Bay at Maplin Way and to the North by Great Wakering which is part of Rochford District.

The MoD Shoeburyness site at Pig's Bay is situated nearby and the facility is run by the company QinetiQ. The Garrison site is now part of a conservation area set up by Southend City Council.

Shoeburyness has two beaches: East Beach and Shoebury Common Beach, both Blue Flag beaches.

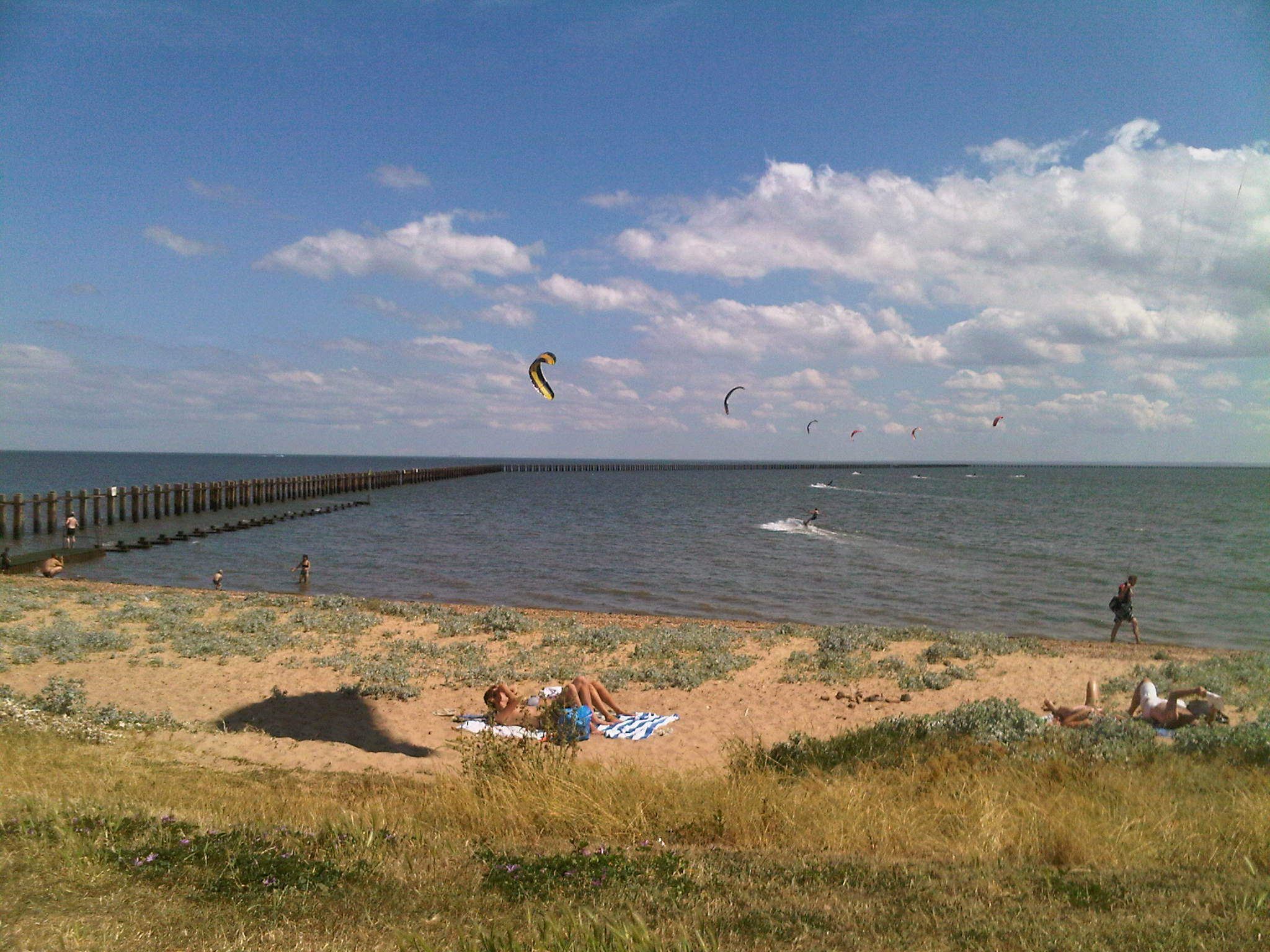
East Beach at Shoeburyness

East Beach is a sandy/pebbly beach around a quarter of a mile long and is sandwiched between the Pig's Bay MoD site and the former Shoeburyness Artillery barracks. Access to the large gravel/grass pay-and-display car park is via Rampart Terrace. The beach is closed when there is live fire at the MOD site.

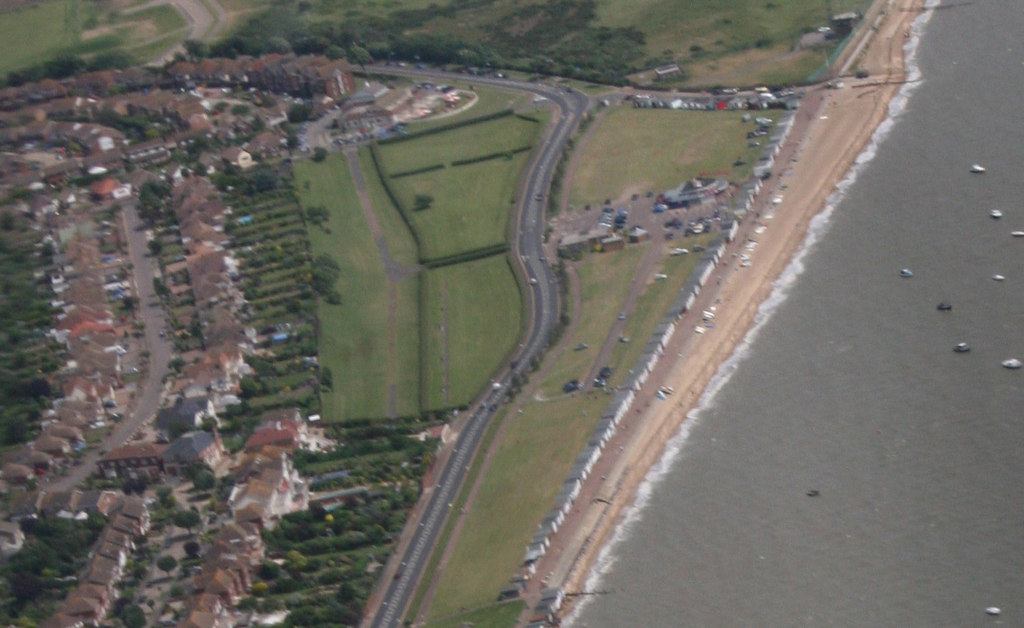
Shoebury Common and Beach

Shoebury Common Beach is bounded to the east by the land formerly occupied by the Shoeburyness Artillery barracks and by Thorpe Bay to the west. Shoebury Common Beach is the site of many beach huts located on both the promenade and the beach. A Coastguard watch tower at the eastern end of the beach keeps watch over the sands and mudflats while listening out for distress calls over the radio. A cycle path skirts around the sea-front linking the East Beach to Shoebury Common Beach, and thence into Southend and onto Chalkwell, in Westcliff-on-Sea.

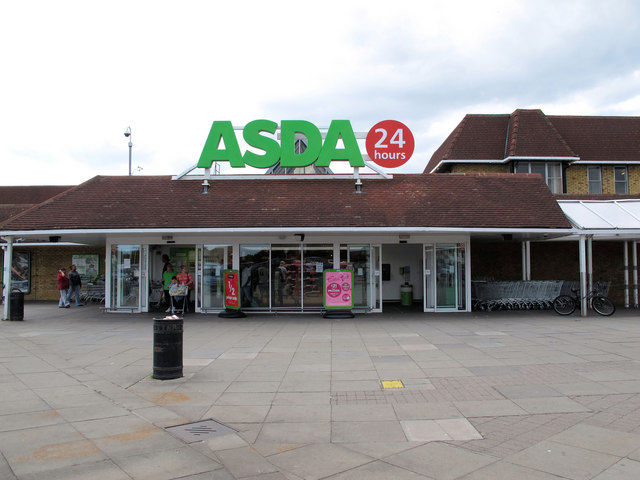
Asda, Shoeburyness

Shoeburyness does not have an actual town centre. There are parades of shops in West Road, Ness Road and The Renown. The town is served by two supermarkets, Asda and Lidl.

Shoeburyness has several industrial estates, with Towerfield Road, Vanguard Way and Campfield Road serving the area.

The town is served by five doctors surgeries and three dentists, with its nearest hospital located at Southend University Hospital.

== Governance ==
There is only one tier of local government covering Shoeburyness, being the unitary authority of Southend-on-Sea City Council. Shoeburyness is split into West Shoebury and Shoeburyness wards, which are both represented by three councillors.

Shoebury was listed in the Domesday Book of 1086, having a population of 33 and lying in the Rochford Hundred. Some time after 1086, the separate parishes of North Shoebury and South Shoebury were created. In Wakering Road, north of Constable Way, stands a marker where the historical boundary between the two civil parishes existed. When parish and district councils were established in December 1894, the parish of North Shoebury was included within the Rochford Rural District whilst the parish of South Shoebury was made an urban district. One of the first actions of the new urban district council was to request a change in the council's name from South Shoebury to Shoeburyness. The change of name took effect in January 1895. The name of the civil parish containing the urban district continued to be called "South Shoebury". In 1931 the parish had a population of 6720. In 1933 both Shoeburyness Urban District Council (which managed the South Shoebury civil parish) and North Shoebury civil parishes were abolished and absorbed into the County Borough of Southend on Sea, except for a more rural eastern part of the old North Shoebury parish which was transferred to the parish of Great Wakering.

Shoeburyness is part of the Southend East and Rochford constituency; the current serving MP is Bayo Alaba.

== Climate ==
Shoeburyness has an Oceanic climate (Köppen: Cfb) and is known to be the driest town in the United Kingdom, with an average precipitation of 527 mm per annum.

For comparison, Lisbon and Rome both receive over 150% of this amount.

Climate data for Shoeburyness, Landwick (1991-2020 normals, extremes 1983-present)
Month	Jan	Feb	Mar	Apr	May	Jun	Jul	Aug	Sep	Oct	Nov	Dec	Year
Record high °C (°F)	15.5 (59.9)	18.2 (64.8)	19.7 (67.5)	25.4 (77.7)	28.6 (83.5)	35.7 (96.3)	33.4 (92.1)	33.2 (91.8)	28.6 (83.5)	28.0 (82.4)	18.0 (64.4)	15.6 (60.1)	35.7 (96.3)
Mean daily maximum °C (°F)	7.8 (46.0)	8.3 (46.9)	10.6 (51.1)	13.5 (56.3)	16.6 (61.9)	19.8 (67.6)	22.3 (72.1)	22.4 (72.3)	19.4 (66.9)	15.3 (59.5)	11.1 (52.0)	8.4 (47.1)	14.7 (58.5)
Daily mean °C (°F)	5.3 (41.5)	5.3 (41.5)	7.1 (44.8)	9.4 (48.9)	12.5 (54.5)	15.5 (59.9)	18.0 (64.4)	18.1 (64.6)	15.5 (59.9)	12.1 (53.8)	8.3 (46.9)	5.8 (42.4)	11.1 (52.0)
Mean daily minimum °C (°F)	2.7 (36.9)	2.4 (36.3)	3.7 (38.7)	5.4 (41.7)	8.3 (46.9)	11.2 (52.2)	13.6 (56.5)	13.8 (56.8)	11.5 (52.7)	8.9 (48.0)	5.5 (41.9)	3.2 (37.8)	7.5 (45.5)
Record low °C (°F)	−11.6 (11.1)	−9.2 (15.4)	−5.5 (22.1)	−5.7 (21.7)	−0.7 (30.7)	2.5 (36.5)	5.9 (42.6)	5.3 (41.5)	2.2 (36.0)	−4.3 (24.3)	−6.0 (21.2)	−9.1 (15.6)	−11.6 (11.1)
Average precipitation mm (inches)	43.0 (1.69)	36.1 (1.42)	32.7 (1.29)	36.1 (1.42)	41.6 (1.64)	44.1 (1.74)	41.1 (1.62)	48.6 (1.91)	43.0 (1.69)	57.8 (2.28)	54.0 (2.13)	48.8 (1.92)	526.8 (20.74)
Average precipitation days (≥ 1.0 mm)	9.5	8.3	7.8	7.5	7.5	7.8	7.3	7.1	7.5	10.2	10.6	10.7	102.0
Mean monthly sunshine hours	70.5	88.9	136.8	200.4	241.2	243.3	257.0	212.2	162.4	130.0	84.7	56.9	1,884.3
Source 1: Met Office
Source 2: Starlings Roost Weather

== Transport ==
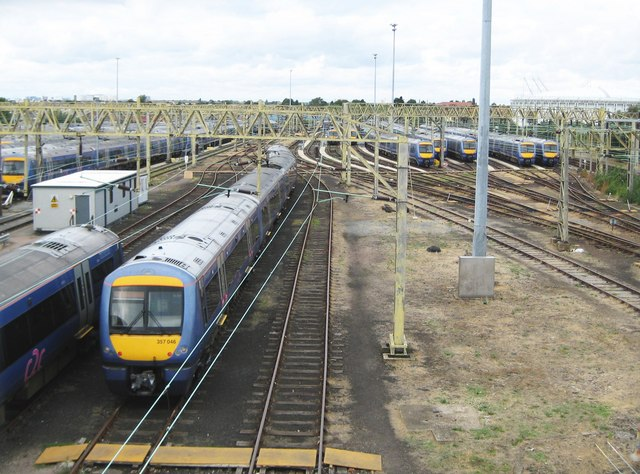
A c2c Class 357 electric multiple unit at Shoeburyness depot

The eastern terminus of the London, Tilbury and Southend line is at Shoeburyness railway station. c2c operates regular services to London Fenchurch Street in the City of London, via Southend Central and Basildon. Shoeburyness Depot is the easternmost railway depot on the line.

The A13 links the town with east London; it provides a direct link to the M25 motorway.

Shoeburyness is served by Arriva Herts & Essex, First Essex and Stephensons of Essex bus companies; routes connect the town with Southend, Leigh-on-Sea and Rayleigh.

== Education ==
Shoeburyness High School is the only secondary school in the town and includes a sixth form. Primary education is provided by St George's Catholic Primary School, Friars Primary School, Hinguar Primary School & Nursery, Richmond Avenue Primary and Nursery School, and Thorpedene Primary School & Nursery. The latter four schools also offer nursery education.

== Leisure ==
Shoeburyness Leisure Centre in Delaware Road provides a swimming pool, gym and indoor courts. Shoeburyness formerly had an operating cinema, The Palace in Ness Road which opened in 1913 and closed in 1955.

Gunners Park and Shoebury Ranges is a 25-hectare nature reserve managed by the Essex Wildlife Trust (EWT). Other parks include Shoeburyness Park, Friars Park, Bishopsteignton Park, Shoebury Common and St. Mary's Nature Reserve. A skate park is located in Anson Chase.

== Conservation ==
Shoebury Garrison is one of Southend's 14 listed conservation areas, being first designated in 1981 before a further extension in 2004. Historic England have listed a total of 44 properties between Grade II and Grade II*, with both parish churches amongst this list. The majority of the listings are on the former garrison site, including the Cart and Wagon Shed heritage and community centre.

== Pig's Bay ==
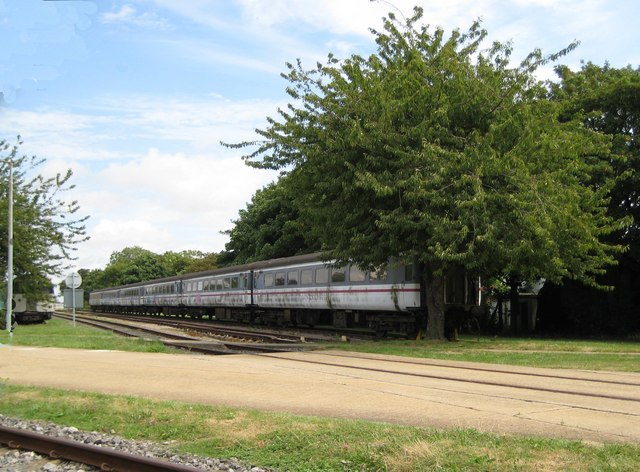
Former Gatwick Express Mark 2 coaches in a siding at Pig's Bay. Just visible at the extreme left is some former Northern line 1972 Stock.

Pig's Bay is a coastal area in the east of Shoeburyness. The main entrance to the site is at Blackgate Road, Shoeburyness. This is also the gateway to the island of Foulness, the third largest island off the coast of England.

The bay is the site of MoD Shoeburyness, a military installation established in 1849 and which is still used as a firing range. The Bay is home to Shoeburyness Boom, a World War II and Cold War defensive boom that is a Scheduled Monument.

One of the other uses of the site is the storage and scrapping of old railway vehicles. It has its own private railway network, stretching for around six miles; it is linked to one of the sidings at Network Rail's Shoeburyness c2c electric multiple unit depot by means of two unmanned level crossings across Shoeburyness High Street and Blackgate Road respectively.

The front Class 43 locomotive of the passenger train involved in the 1997 Southall rail crash – when an InterCity 125 collided with a freight train, killing seven people – was scrapped here. It was cut up by Serco three years after the incident, once the inquiry had been completed.

== In popular culture ==
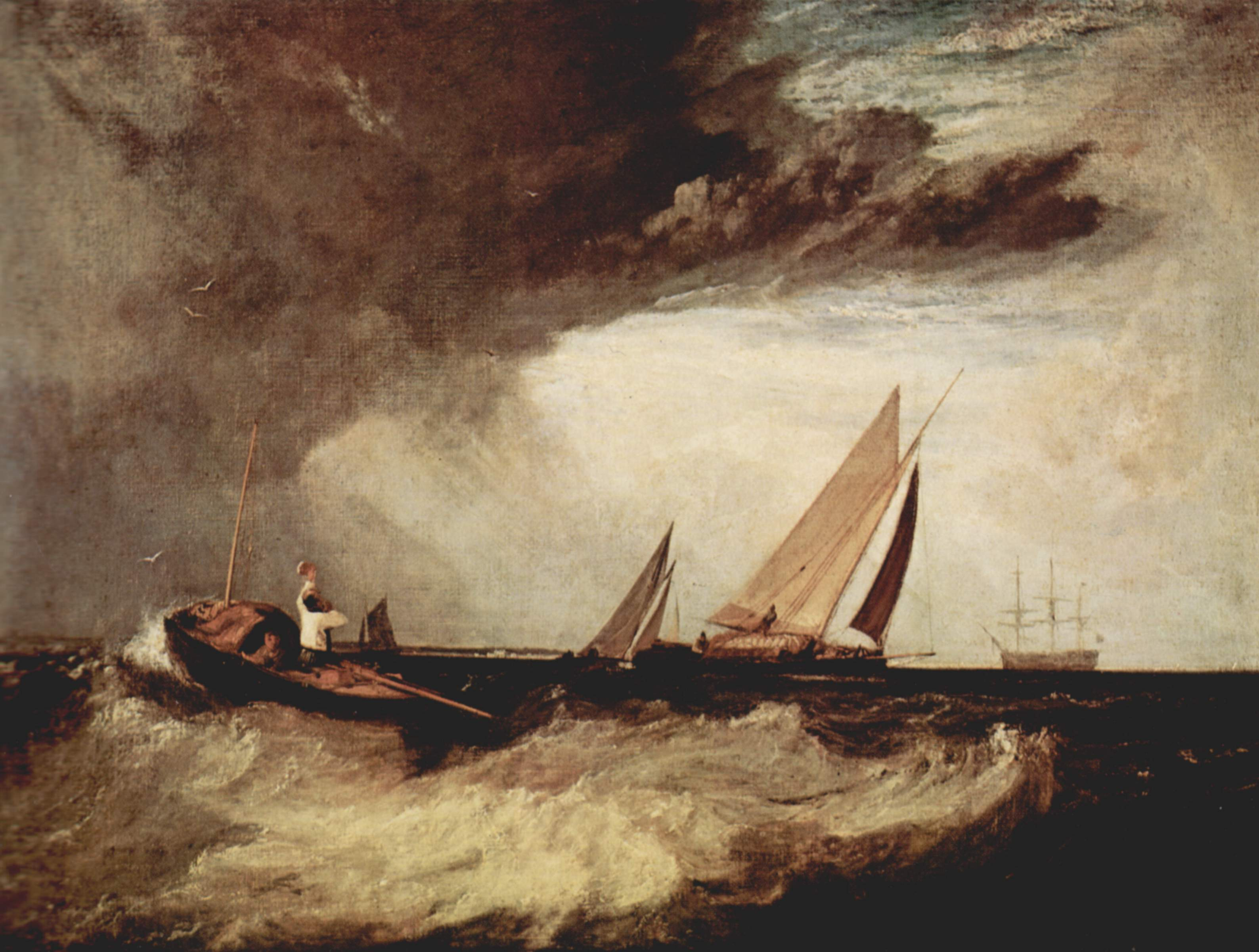
Shoeburyness Fisherman Hailing a Whitstable Hoy by J. M. W. Turner, 1809

The English painter J. M. W. Turner depicted the fishermen of Shoeburyness in his oil painting Shoeburyness Fishermen Hailing a Whitstable Hoy. The painting was exhibited in 1809, and was part of a series Turner made of the Thames estuary between 1808 and 1810. The painting has been in the collection of the National Gallery of Canada since 1939.

In the fifth Temeraire novel Victory of Eagles (2008) by Naomi Novik, Shoeburyness is the setting of a fictitious climactic battle in which Wellesley and Nelson drive Napoleon out of England in early 1808.

Shoeburyness is home to "the commuter", protagonist in the eponymous song and music video by Ceephax Acid Crew.

Shoeburyness is one of the better-known entrants in Douglas Adams' and John Lloyd's 1990 spoof dictionary The Deeper Meaning of Liff. It is defined as "the vague feeling of uncomfortableness caused by sitting on a bus seat still warm from someone else's bottom."

Shoeburyness was featured in the Viral Marketing for the Universal Pictures 2022 American science fiction action film sequel Jurassic World Dominion, with a number of the featured videos on the DinoTracker website filmed in the area doubling for locations around the world.

== Notable people ==
- Larry Gains (1900–1983), Canadian black boxer, former World Coloured Heavyweight Champion, lived and trained at Shoebury Hotel
- Tony Holland (1940–2007), BBC screenwriter, was born in Shoeburyness
- David Nelson (VC) (1887–1918), student and instructor at the Royal Artillery School of Gunnery, Shoeburyness
- Godfrey Rampling (1909–2009), English athlete, resident.
