= Education in Southend-on-Sea =

The location of Essex within England

Southend-on-Sea is the area in yellow numbered 13 on this map of Essex

Southend-on-Sea is a city in the English ceremonial county of Essex. Formal education started in Prittlewell in 1727 with a church school. With the growth of the city, education expanded into primary, secondary and further education during the 19th century. In the late 20th century, University of Essex opened a campus in the city, however this is due to close in Summer 2026.

== Formation of education in the city ==
=== Primary education ===
The first school in the city opened in Prittlewell in 1727, after the Reverend Case campaigned for one to be set up. Land was provided by the Lord of the Manor Daniel Scratton in North Street for establishment of a school, and by 1739, Scratton had donated a further 21 acres of land. The school was by subscription of 1d a week, with 16 free places provided, and the remainder of the funding provided by a partial subscription of the parish and collections at St Mary's. The parliamentary commission into charities of 1819–37 described the school as "a house of lath and plaster, situate in the village near the bridge; it comprises a schoolroom of about 30ft. in length and 20ft. in breadth, and several other rooms which are appropriated to the use of the schoolmaster".

After Southend became a separate ecclesiastical district in 1842, the church of St. John's the Baptist founded the subscription National School in 1855 in Lower Southend. By 1876, the Board of Education called for a local board of education be set up and extra places be created. At the time of their report Southend had the following schools providing education for under 12s:

- Prittlewell Church of England – 175 pupils
- British School – 233 pupils
- Miss Felton's Infant School – 7 pupils
- Grovesnor School – 54 pupils

It was reported that the National School had closed and that Southend required a further 220 places. Many parishioners were against a local school board being set up, but Daniel Scratton was for the development, and by 1877 the Prittlewell School Board was formed.

By 1879, a new school was created called the London Road Schools which had places for over 500 pupils, and Prittlewell Church of England school had moved to East Street. However, by 1892, with further expansion of Southend, the Brewery Road School (now called Porters Grange) opened, followed by Leigh Road (which would become Hamlet Court County School) in 1897, Southchurch Hall in 1904, Bournemouth Park in 1907 and Chalkwell Park in 1909. The local board was dissolved by the Education Act 1902 (2 Edw. 7. c. 42) and replaced by the education committee of the council.

=== Secondary and further education ===
The Science and Art Department formation in 1853 had seen the government push for education in art, science, technology, and design in Britain and Ireland. The movement did not arrive in Southend until 1882 when two evening classes were set up at the London Road Schools for Art and Physiology. By 1883 the classes were moved to Clarence Street in a building shared with the council.

The Technical Instruction Act 1889 (52 & 53 Vict. c. 76) and the Technical Instruction Act 1891 (54 & 55 Vict. c. 4) allowed councils to provide evening classes for technical subjects. The local board set up the Technical Instruction Committee, and soon classes were started at the council offices in Clarence Road. They were extremely popular, and the following year the newly created Southend Corporation purchased further land in Clarence Road to build a Technical Institute. In 1895 the foundation stone was laid, but prior to it opening it was decided to also open a day technical school for about 20 pupils, influenced by the Bryce commission of 1894. The first headmaster was J Hitchcock from Woolwich and was supported by one assistant teacher. A one-day a week art school was opened, which by 1899 was a fully organised art college.

A foundation stone was laid by Lord Avebury in 1901 for the new Day Technical School, School of Art and Evening Class Institute with the completed building being opened by the Countess of Warwick a year later. The Day Technical School soon outgrew the Clarence Road site, and in 1902 a new building opened at Victoria Circus to host them, the Evening Technical Institute and the School of Art. In 1907, Essex County Council formed a new Higher Education committee, who decided that education should be split into separate boys and girls schools. In 1912, a foundation stone was laid in Boston Avenue for a new girls school, and a year later the girls left the Day Technical School to the new Southend High School for Girls. The Day Technical School was renamed as Southend High School for Boys. In 1914, Southend became a County Borough, taking charge of all education in the town, including the High School, School of Art and the Evening class institute all located still in the same building. After the war the number of pupils increased, so in 1919 the School of Art moved out of the top floor to make room for the High School, into temporary wooden buildings at the rear of the building. In 1920, The Commercial School was a co-educational school opened for the town's rapidly expanding population in Bellsfield, a former large house located on Victoria Avenue. Two years later, the school's name changed from The Commercial School to Westcliff High School, and by 1926, boys attending the school had moved to the school's present site on Kenilworth Gardens, becoming Westcliff High School for Boys. The accompanying girls' school, Westcliff High School for Girls, remained on the Victoria Avenue site until 1930, following their relocation to the same site as Westcliff High School for Boys. The plans for the purchased land at the corner of Victoria Avenue and Carnarvon Road was changed in 1934 when it was decided to use this as the site of a new town hall.

In 1922, the School of Art grew by adding a School of Architecture The School of Art would become the nucleus of the newly formed Southend Technical and Commercial School. A Junior Technical department was opened at Fairfax Drive in 1929, but moved to Victoria Circus in 1934 to make way for Fairfax Senior Mixed School, and in 1935 the Technical and Commercial school was renamed Southend Municipal College, who took over the whole site after Southend High School for Boys moved to Prittlewell Chase in 1938. The college was restructured in 1963 to include in its teaching commercial and industrial skills for education in courses like plumbing, and renamed as the Southend College of Technology. The college became South East Essex College of Arts and Technology (SEECAT) in 1991, with the college formally merged with Thurrock and Basildon College on 1 January 2010 and was renamed South Essex College.

== Current education in the city ==
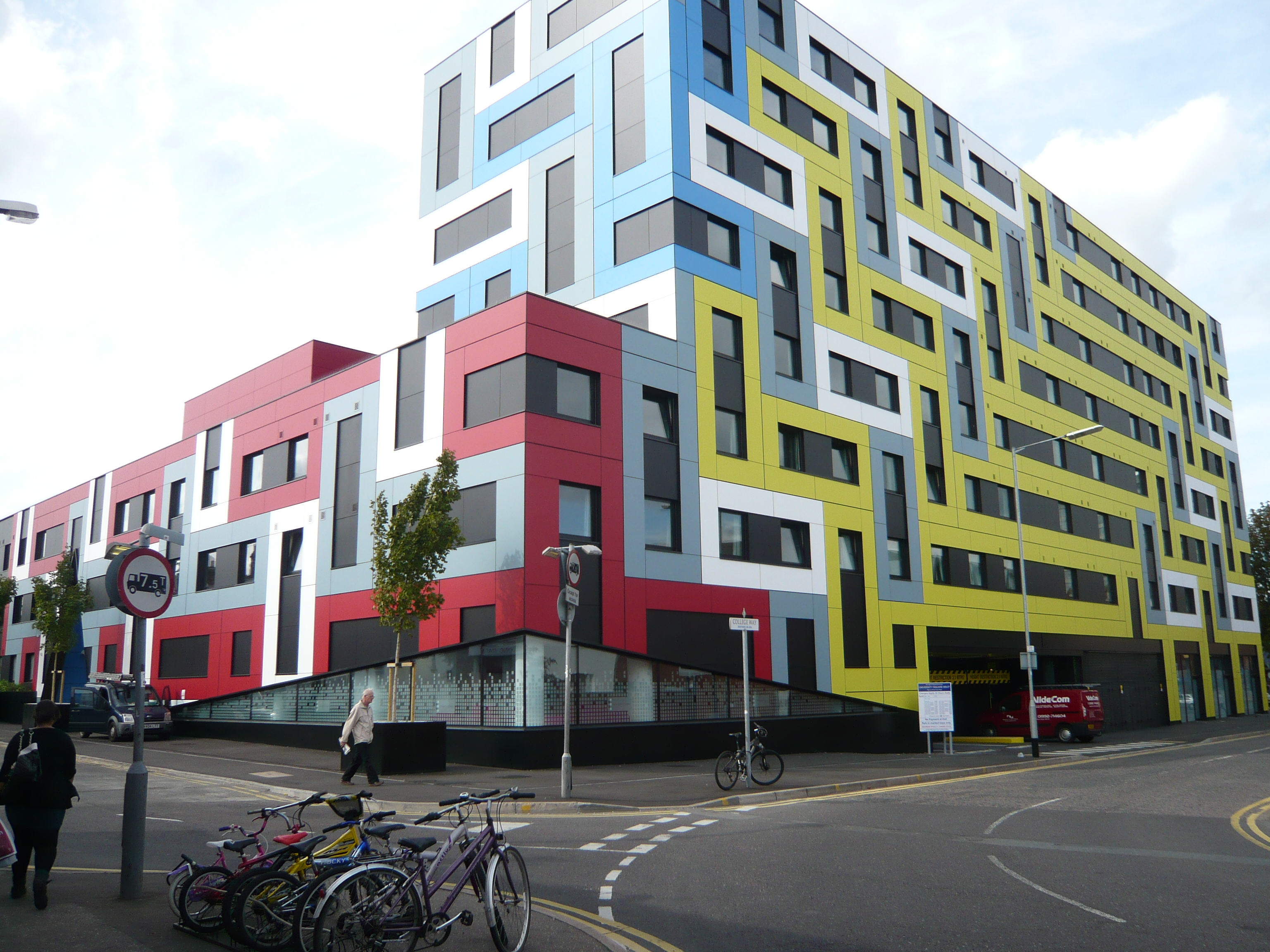
University of Essex accommodation in Southend

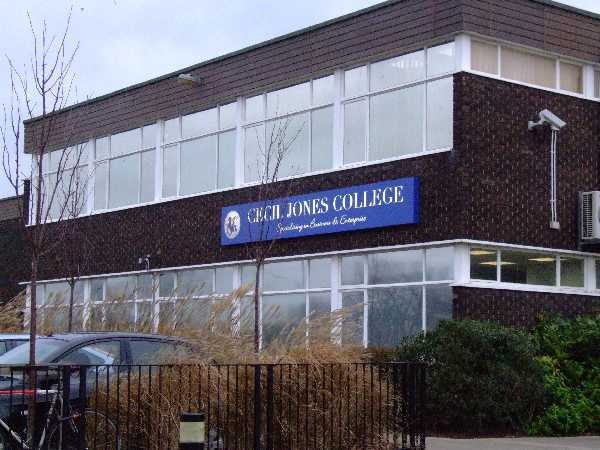
Cecil Jones Academy

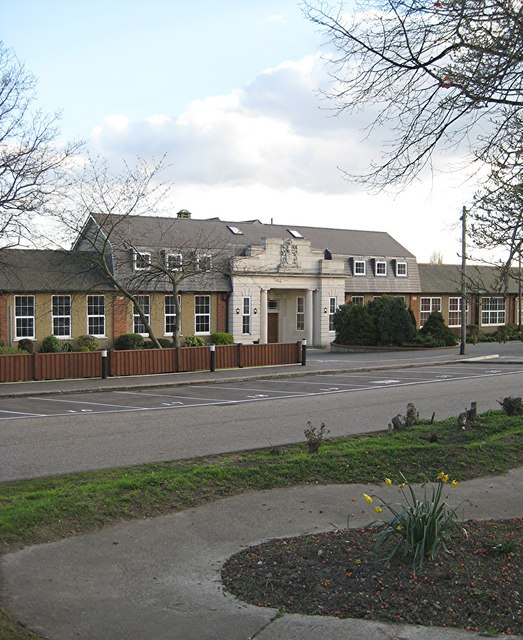
Westcliff High School for Boys

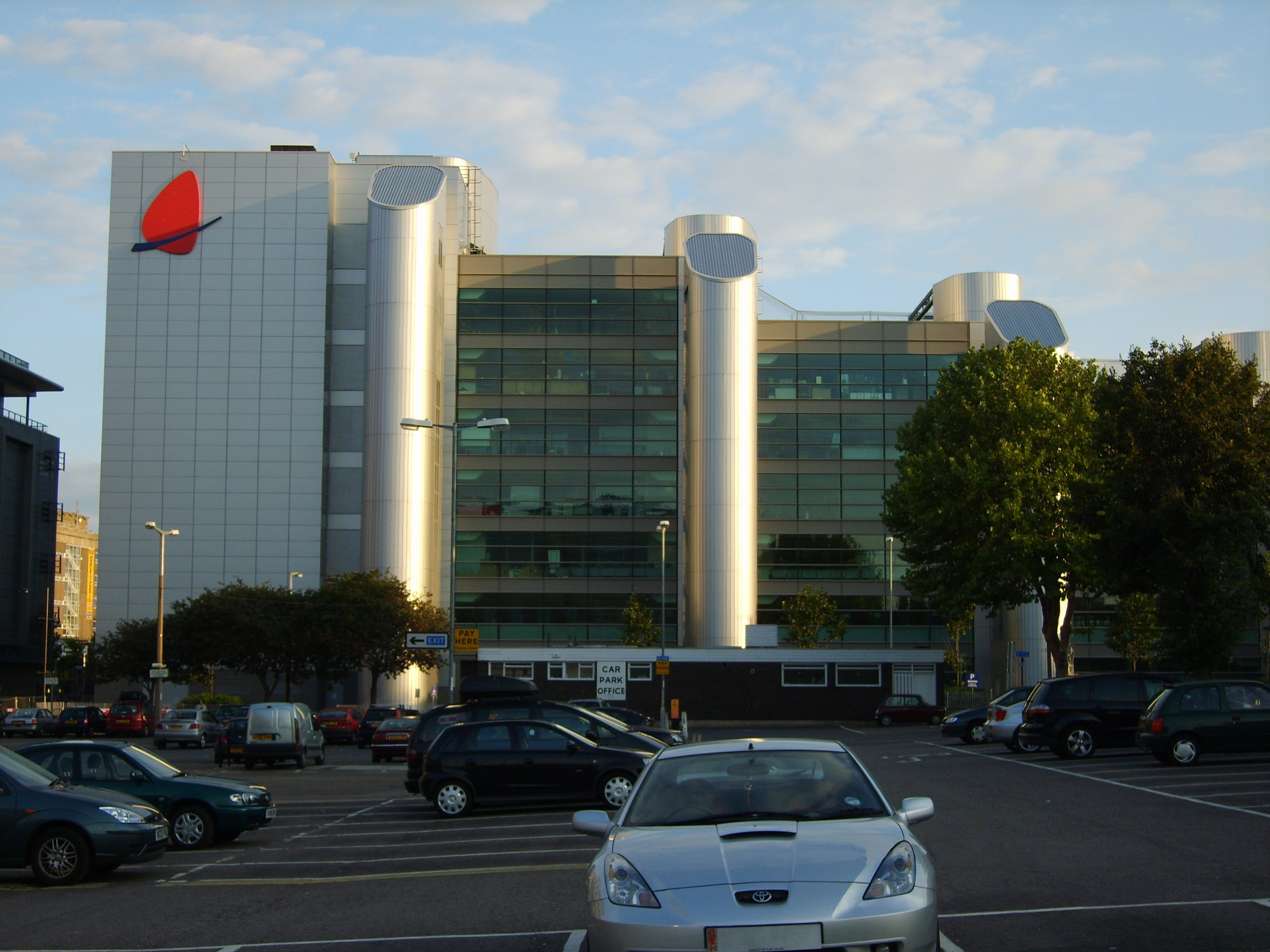
South Essex College Southend Campus

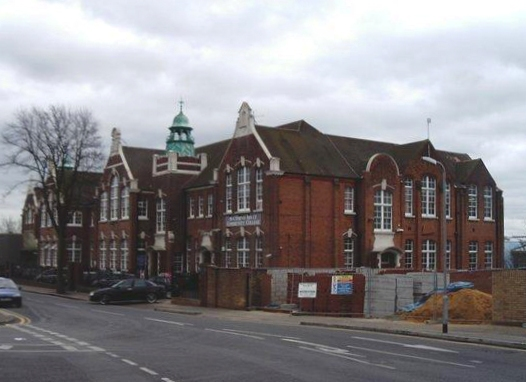
Southend Adult Community College

=== Secondary schools ===
Southend has a mixture of secondary school offerings. The mainstream secondary schools are mixed-sex comprehensives, however, the city retained the grammar school system and has four such schools. Additionally, there are two single-sex schools assisted by the Roman Catholic Church.

=== Higher and further education ===
The main higher education provider in Southend is the University of Essex which has a campus in Elmer Approach, that opened in 2007 and is on the site of the former Odeon cinema. The university has operated from the city since 2003 when they opened a new satellite campus at Princess Caroline House in the High Street. It also operates the East 15 Acting School Southend campus at the Clifftown Theatre. It was announced in December 2025 that the Southend campus would close in Summer 2026, with courses transferring to the Colchester campus.

In addition to a number of secondary schools that offer further education, the largest provider is South Essex College in a purpose-built building in the centre of town. Formerly known as South East Essex College, (and previously Southend Municipal College) the college changed name in January 2010 following a merger with Thurrock and Basildon College.

Additionally there is PROCAT, (an arm of South Essex College) that is based at Progress Road, while learners can travel to USP College (formerly SEEVIC College) in Thundersley. The East 15 Acting School, a drama school has its second campus in Southend, while the Southend Adult Community College is in Ambleside Drive. Southend United Futsal & Football Education Scholarship, located at Southend United's stadium Roots Hall, provides education for sports scholarships.

== List of state-funded primary schools ==
Name	Location	Academy group or type of school	Comments	References
Barons Court Primary School	Westcliff-on-Sea	Learning in Harmony Multi Academy Trust	Converted to academy status in February 2024.	
Blenheim Primary School	Leigh-on-Sea	Learning in Harmony Multi Academy Trust	Converted to academy status in 2016	
Bournemouth Park Academy	Southchurch	Eastwood Park Academy Trust	Opened in 1907 as Bournemouth Park Infant and Junior Schools. Converted to academy status in 2017.	
Bournes Green Infant School	Southchurch	South East Community Academy Trust	Converted to academy status in 2016.	
Bournes Green Junior School	Southchurch	South East Community Academy Trust	Converted to academy status in 2017.	
Chalkwell Hall Infant School	Chalkwell	Community School	Opened in 1909.	
Chalkwell Hall Junior School	Chalkwell	Community school	Opened in 1909.	
Darlinghurst Academy	Leigh-on-Sea	Legra Academy Trust	Converted to academy status in 2014.	
Earls Hall Primary School	Westcliff-on-Sea	Community school	Built between April 1937 and June 1938, opening in August 1938 as separate Infant and Junior schools, with 135 and 155 pupils respectively. The two schools merged into one school in 2015.	
Eastwood Primary School	Eastwood, Leigh-on-Sea	Foundation school		
Edwards Hall Primary School	Eastwood, Leigh-on-Sea	Learning in Harmony Multi Academy Trust	Converted to academy status in 2021.	
Fairways Primary School	Leigh-on-Sea	Community school	The school was built as separate infant and junior schools in 1952 and 1953. The schools combined as a singular school in 1985.	
Friars Primary School	Shoeburyness	Portico Academy Trust	Opened as separate infant and junior schools which were merged in 2004. Converted to Academy status in 2016.	
Greenways Primary School	Southchurch	Learning in Harmony Multi Academy Trust	Originally opened as Thorpe Greenways separate infant and junior schools, the schools were merged and the name changed in 2016 when converted to academy status.	
Hamstel Infant School and Nursery	Southchurch	Portico Academy Trust	Converted to academy status in 2016	
Hamstel Junior School	Southchurch	Portico Academy Trust	Converted to academy status in 2016	
Heycroft Primary School	Eastwood, Leigh-on-Sea	South East Essex Academy Trust	Converted to academy status in 2024.	
Hinguar Community Primary School	Shoeburyness	South East Community Academy Trust	Converted to academy trust in 2016.	
Leigh North Street Primary School	Leigh-on-Sea	Community school	Opened in 1890.	
Milton Hall Primary School	Westcliff-on-Sea	Foundation school		
Our Lady of Lourdes Catholic Primary School	Leigh-on-Sea	Assisi Catholic Trust	Converted to academy in 2018.	
Porters Grange Primary School and Nursery	Southchurch	Portico Academy Trust	Opened as Brewery Road School in 1892. Converted to academy status in 2016.	
Prince Avenue Academy and Nursery	Prittlewell	South East Essex Academy Trust	Converted to academy status in 2014.	
Richmond Avenue Primary and Nursery School	Shoeburyness	South East Community Academy Trust	Opened in 1903. Converted to academy status in 2017	
Sacred Heart Catholic Primary School	Southchurch	Assisi Catholic Trust	Opened in 1920. Converted to academy status in 2018	
St George's Catholic Primary School	Shoeburyness	Assisi Catholic Trust	Converted to academy trust in 2018.	
St Helen's Catholic Primary School	Southend-on-Sea	Assisi Catholic Trust	Opened in 1899, the school has been located at the current site since 1973. Converted to academy status in 2018.	
St Mary's, Prittlewell, CofE Primary School	Southend-on-Sea & Prittlewell	Voluntary aided school	Opened in 1727 in Prittlewell as Prittlewell Church of England School, the school moved to East Street, next to St Mary's Church in the 19th-century. In 1999, the school moved to Boston Avenue, which had previously been home to Southend High School for Girls, Dowsett High School for Girls, Westborough High School for Girls and Prittlewell High School. The school has since re-opened at East Street, operating across two sites.	
Temple Sutton Primary School	Southchurch	Learning in Harmony Multi Academy Trust	Opened in 1949 on the new Temple Sutton housing estate, the school split into infant and junior schools in 1953, before merging again in 1988. Converted to academy status in 2018	
Thorpedene Primary School	Shoeburyness	South East Community Academy Trust	Converted to an academy trust in 2016.	
West Leigh Infant School	Community School	Leigh-on-Sea	Opened in 1913.	
West Leigh Junior School	Leigh-on-Sea	Portico Academy Trust	Opened in 1913.	
The Westborough School	Westcliff-on-Sea	South East Essex Academy Trust	Opened in 1913 as a mixed school with Infants, Senior Boys and Senior Girls departments. In 1953, the senior boys were transferred to Fairfax Mixed Senior School, while the girls transferred from Fairfax to Westborough, with the senior school renamed Westborough High School for Girls. In 1966, the senior school moved to the former Southend High School for Girls and Dowsett High School site in Boston Avenue, leaving the primary school at MacDonald Avenue. Converted to an academy in 2017.	

== List of state-funded secondary schools ==
=== Non-selective secondary schools ===
Name	Location	Academy group	Comments	References
Belfairs Academy	Leigh-on-Sea	Legra Academy Trust	Opened in 1955 as Belfairs High School, the school was rebuilt under the government's Building Schools for the Future in 2011. Converted to academy status in 2012.	
Cecil Jones Academy	Southchurch	Loxford School Trust	Opened in 1969 as Cecil Jones High School as Southend's first comprehensive school. Converted to an academy in 2015.	
Chase High School	Westcliff-on-Sea	Discovery Educational Trust	A new start school formed from Prittlewell Technology College in 2006. Converted to academy status in 2015.	
The Eastwood Academy	Eastwood, Leigh-on-Sea	Eastwood Park Academy Trust	Originally opened as Eastwood Senior School in 1939. Converted to academy status in 2011.	
St Bernard's High School	Westcliff-on-Sea	St Bernard's High School Academy	A school opened on the site in 1875, but in 1910 the Bernardine Sisters founded St. Bernard's. Converted to academy status in 2011.	
St Thomas More High School	Westcliff-on-Sea	Assisi Catholic Trust	Opened in 1960. Converted to academy status in 2011.	
Shoeburyness High School	Shoeburyness	South East Community Academy Trust	Converted to academy status in 2011.	
Southchurch High School	Southchurch	Partnership Academy Trust	Opened in 2016, replacing Futures Community College.	

=== Grammar schools ===
Name	Location	Academy group	Comments	References
Southend High School for Boys	Prittlewell	Southend High School for Boys Academy Trust	Opened as the Day Technical School in Clarence Road in 1895. Moved to Victoria Circus in 1902, with the girls leaving for a new site in Boston Avenue in 1913, with the school being renamed to the current name. The school, which shared the Victoria Circus with the School of Art and the Evening Technical Institute, outgrew the building and moved to the current site in 1938. Converted to academy status in 2011.	
Southend High School for Girls	Southchurch	Southend High School for Girls Academy Trust	Opened as the Day Technical School in Clarence Road in 1895. Moved to Victoria Circus in 1902, with the girls leaving for a new site in Boston Avenue in 1913, with the school being renamed to the current name. The school moved to the current site in the late 1950s, with the Boston Avenue site becoming home to Dowsett High School for Girls in 1957. Converted to academy status in 2011.	
Westcliff High School for Boys	Westcliff-on-Sea	Westcliff High School for Boys Ltd	Opened in 1920 after the Education committee of Southend Corporation purchased a large house called Belsfield on Victoria Avenue. The new school was originally named the Commercial Secondary School, but in 1922 it was renamed Westcliff High School. The boys moved to the current site in 1926. Converted to academy status in 2010.	
Westcliff High School for Girls	Westcliff-on-Sea	South Essex Academy Trust	Opened in 1920 after the Education committee of Southend Corporation purchased a large house called Belsfield on Victoria Avenue. The new school was originally named the Commercial Secondary School, but in 1922 it was renamed Westcliff High School. The girls moved to the current site in 1926, but the girls stayed until the new building was ready in 1931. Converted to academy status in 2011.	

=== Special and alternative schools ===
Name	Location	Academy group	Comments	References
Kingsdown School	Eastwood, Leigh-on-Sea	SEN Trust Southend	Converted to academy status in 2017.	
Lancaster School	Westcliff-on-Sea	SEN Trust Southend	Converted to academy status in 2017.	
The St Christopher School	Leigh-on-Sea	SEN Trust Southend	Converted to academy status in 2012.	
St Nicholas School	Southchurch	SEN Trust Southend	Converted to academy status in 2017.	
Southend YMCA Community School	Prittlewell	Free school	Opened in 2013	
Sutton House Academy	Southend	Parallel Learning Trust	Opened in 2017 as an academy, replacing its predecessor Seabrook College.	
Victory Park Academy	Southend	Parallel Learning Trust	Opened in 2018 as an academy, replacing its predecessor Seabrook College.	

== List of further education and apprenticeship training providers ==
Name	Provider type	References
Central Training Academy	Independent Training Provider	
Crown Vocational Training	Independent Training Provider	
RM Training Ltd	Independent Training Provider	
Southend Adult Community College	Adult Education Provider	
South Essex College / PROCAT	Incorporated Further Education Provider	
Vocational Training Services	Independent Training Provider	

== Higher education ==
- University of Essex

== List of Independent schools ==
=== Primary and preparatory schools ===
- Alleyn Court Prep School
- Beis Chinuch Lebonos Westcliff
- St Michael's CofE Preparatory School
- Saint Pierre School

=== Senior and all-through schools ===
- Thorpe Hall School

=== Special and alternative schools ===
- Compass Community School Boleyn Park
- Estuary High School
