= Spencer Livermore, Baron Livermore =

British politician and strategist

The Right Honourable The Lord Livermore
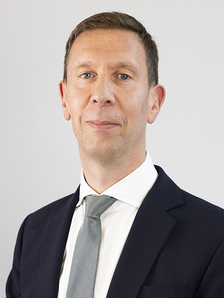
- Official Portrait, 2024

Financial Secretary to the Treasury
- In office 8 July 2024 – 20 July 2026
- Prime Minister: Keir Starmer
- Preceded by: Nigel Huddleston
- Succeeded by: James Murray

Member of the House of Lords
- Lord Temporal
- Life peerage 21 October 2015
Shadow portfolios
2023–2024	Treasury
2020–2020	Whip

Personal details
- Born: Spencer Elliot Livermore; 12 June 1975 (age 51) Slough, Berkshire, England
- Party: Labour
- Spouse: Seb Dance
- Education: Beauchamps High School; Basildon College
- Alma mater: London School of Economics (BSc)

Spencer Elliot Livermore, Baron Livermore (born 12 June 1975) is a British politician and strategist serving as a Member of the House of Lords since 2015 and Financial Secretary to the Treasury since 2024. A member of the Labour Party, he was chief strategist to Gordon Brown during his tenure as Prime Minister and Chancellor of the Exchequer.

== Early life and education ==
Spencer Elliot Livermore was born on 12 June 1975 in Slough, Berkshire. He was raised in Wickford, Essex and attended Beauchamps High School and Basildon College.

In 1996, Livermore graduated from the London School of Economics with a Bachelor of Science in Economics; he later became a visiting senior fellow at the university.

== Career ==
=== Treasury ===
Livermore worked for Gordon Brown, then Shadow Chancellor of the Exchequer, during the 1997 general election campaign. Following Labour's election victory and Brown's appointment as Chancellor, he was employed as a special adviser in the Treasury.

He was seconded to Labour's election team ahead of the 2001 general election, as director of attack and rebuttal, and returned to the Treasury following the election. He was also seconded to several US Congressional campaigns whilst working for Brown.

Livermore was campaign strategist to the Chancellor for the 2005 general election, and described by Philip Gould as one of seven people who devised Labour's election strategy in 2001 and 2005.

Following the 2005 election, he was appointed chief strategy adviser to Brown. Prior to the 2007 Budget, Livermore reportedly advised against Brown's decision to abolish the 10p income tax rate.

=== Downing Street ===
Following Brown's appointment as Prime Minister in 2007, Livermore was appointed as director of strategy in Downing Street. Responsible for strategic planning and attending Cabinet meetings, he devised the strategy for the Prime Minister's transition and first 100 days in office.

Livermore unsuccessfully argued for a General Election in Autumn 2007, writing the initial strategy memo to the Prime Minister on the matter. He left Downing Street in 2008, the first of Brown's senior advisers to do so, to become a senior strategist at Saatchi & Saatchi.

Livermore reportedly declined an offer from Peter Mandelson to become Downing Street Chief of Staff, and a request from Gordon Brown to work on Labour's 2010 general election campaign. He has since been an occasional commentator on political strategy in the media.

=== Private Sector and Opposition ===
Livermore became director of strategy at Teneo Blue Rubicon after leaving Saatchi & Saatchi, where he established Thirty Six Strategy in 2012. He subsequently worked at McKinsey & Company in their European Banking Practice.

He returned to politics in 2014, as director of Labour's 2015 general election campaign. Livermore was appointed to the House of Lords on 21 October 2015, as Baron Livermore of Rotherhithe in the London Borough of Southwark. He was a member of the Economic Affairs Select Committee from 2016 to 2019.

Following Keir Starmer's election as Labour Leader in April 2020, Livermore served as an opposition whip until July 2020. He returned to the shadow front bench as Shadow Exchequer Secretary to the Treasury in April 2023. He was a member of the General Election Strategy Group for Labour's 2024 general election campaign.

=== Government ===
Following the 2024 general election, Livermore was appointed Financial Secretary to the Treasury on 8 July 2024.

== Personal life ==
In 2007, Livermore was listed as the 'most powerful' gay man in British politics by both the Gay Times and Pink News.

He is married to Seb Dance, a former Labour Member of the European Parliament now serving as Deputy Mayor of London for Transport. They live in Rotherhithe, London.

Orders of precedence in the United Kingdom
Preceded by The Lord Murphy of Torfaen	Gentlemen; Baron Livermore	Followed by The Lord Hain
