= Chase High School (disambiguation) =

Chase High School may refer to:

== United States ==
- Chase High School (Kansas), Chase, Kansas
- Chase High School (North Carolina), Forest City, North Carolina
- Chase County Junior/Senior High School, Cottonwood Falls, Kansas
- Chase County High School (Nebraska), Imperial, Nebraska
- Bethesda-Chevy Chase High School, Bethesda, Maryland

== England ==
- Chase High School, Westcliff-on-Sea, Essex
- The Chase School, Malvern, Worcestershire
