= Southend Court House =

Court building in Southend-on-Sea, England

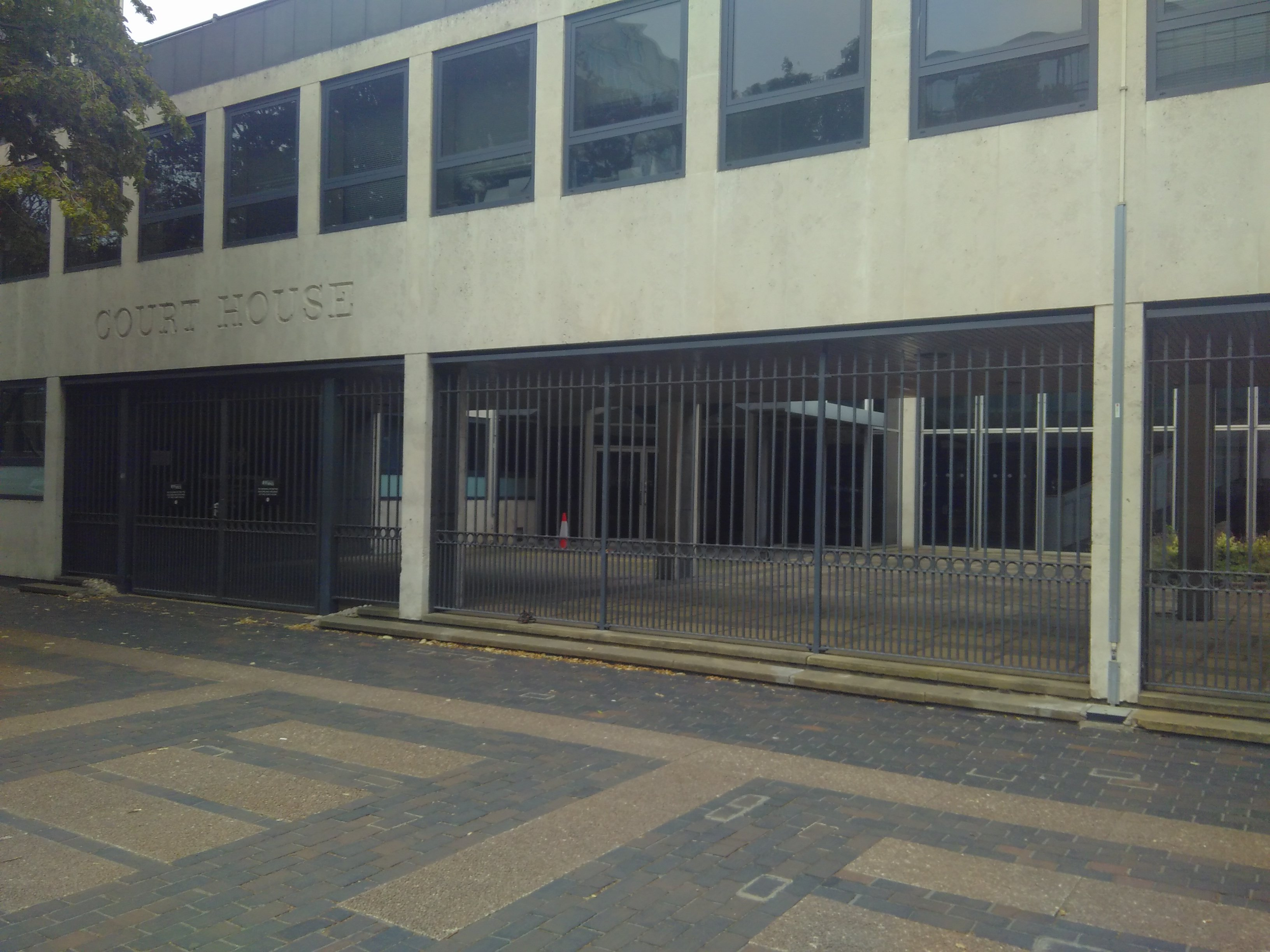
- Southend Court House

- Shown in Essex
- 51.5437°N 0.7098°E
- Location: Victoria Avenue, Southend-on-Sea

History
- Built: 1966

Site notes
- Architect: Patrick Burridge
- Architectural style: Modernist style

Southend Court House is a Crown Court venue which deals with criminal cases, as well as a County Court venue, which deals with civil cases, in Victoria Avenue, Southend-on-Sea, England. Located immediately to the south of Southend Civic Centre, it is also the venue for magistrates' court hearings.

== History ==
Until the mid-1960s, the main venue for criminal court hearings in Southend-on-Sea was a courthouse on Alexandra Street. It was first built there for the petty session hearings in 1883, rebuilt in the early 20th century, and then re-built again in 1924. It continued to serve the borough for much of the 20th century. However, as the number of court cases in Southend grew, it became necessary to commission a more modern courthouse. Southend Corporation planned a new a Civic Centre which would encompass a new police station, the courthouse, council offices and chamber, a new College and a Library on a site first purchased by the council in 1919 for a further education college, but had been reallocated as a town hall site in 1934. The planned fire station for the site was dropped and it was built in Sutton Road.

The new building was designed by the borough architect, Patrick Burridge, in the Modernist style, built in concrete and glass and was completed in 1966. The design involved an asymmetrical main frontage of 30 bays facing onto Victoria Avenue. On the left of the main frontage, there was a wide opening of 12 bays leading to an inner courtyard and a glass doorway beyond. The building was fenestrated by a series of small square casement windows on both floors. Internally, the building was laid out to accommodate two courtrooms. Following the implementation of the Courts Act 1971, the courthouse became the venue for hearings of the newly designated Southend Crown Court.

The borough council commissioned a bronze sculpture entitled "Leda and the Swan" which was designed by Lucette Cartwright. It was initially placed outside the courthouse but when councillors decided to relocate the sculpture to the civic square there was a backlash from protestors who objected to the sexual nature of the artist's work which depicted the thunder god, Zeus, in the form of a swan, raping a woman. The sculpture was initially moved to the courtyard of the Palace Theatre in Westcliff-on-Sea and but it was later relocated to the mayor's residence where it was placed safely out of view.

Notable court cases have included the trial and conviction of Rick Kerry, in June 2013, for robbery. He leapt from the dock and escaped from the courthouse immediately after sentencing but was later re-captured.
