= County Borough of Southend on Sea =

Former local government area in the UK

Coordinates: 51.55°N 0.71°E

Southend-on-Sea Southend (1866–1892)
- Local Government District (1866–1892); Municipal Borough (1892–1914); County Borough (1914–1974)
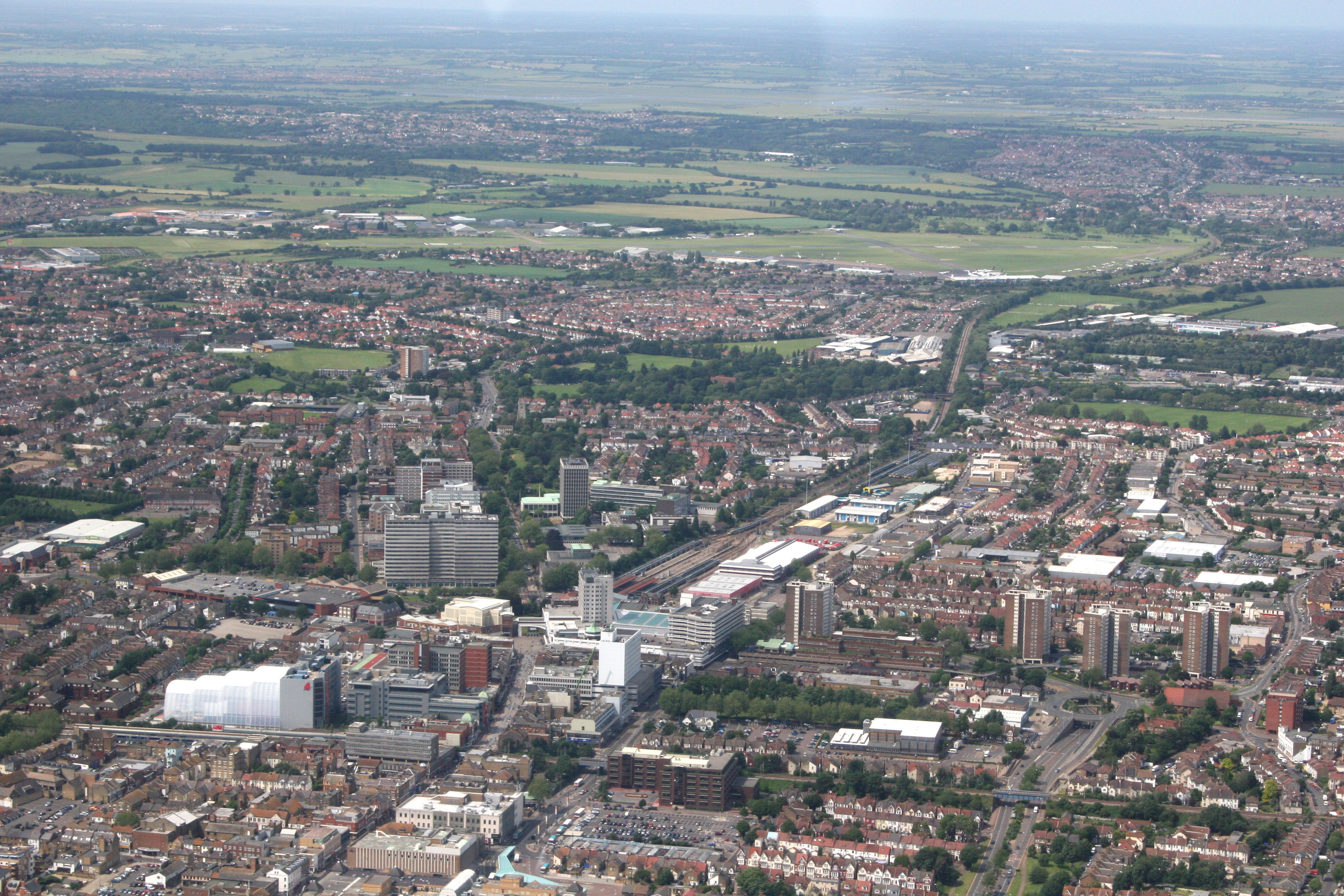
- Area
  - 1961: 10,285 acres (41.6 km^{2})
- Population
  - 1961: 165,093
- History
  - Created: 1892
  - Abolished: 1974
- Status: Local government district (1866–1892); Municipal borough (1892–1914); County borough (1914–1974)
- Government: Southend Local Board (1866–1892); Southend Corporation (1892–1974)
  - Motto: Per Mare Per Ecclesiam (By Sea, By Church)
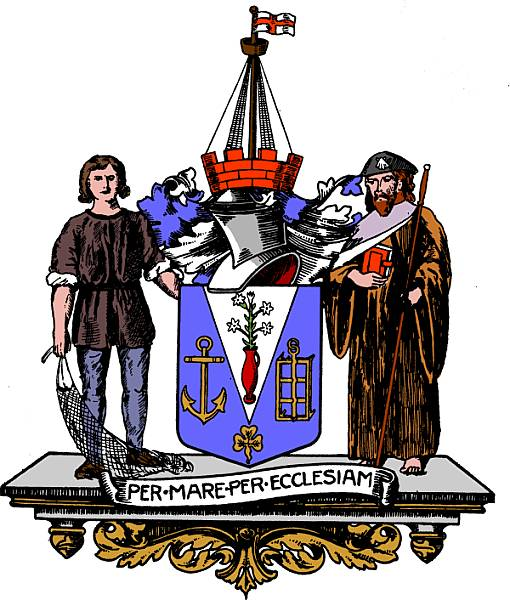
- Coat of arms granted in 1915

The County Borough of Southend-on-Sea was a local government district covering the seaside resort of Southend-on-Sea in Essex, England. Southend was governed by an elected local board from 1866 until 1892, when the town was incorporated to become a municipal borough, at which point it was officially renamed Southend-on-Sea. The borough was raised to the status of a county borough in 1914, taking over the provision of county-level services from Essex County Council. The county borough was abolished in 1974 and replaced by a non-metropolitan district of Southend-on-Sea covering the same area but with its council having different powers.

== History ==
South End, as it was originally known, was initially some fishermen's huts at the south end of the village and parish of Prittlewell. Southend grew rapidly in the 19th century, and more modern forms of local government were needed to administer the growing town. Although Southend became a separate ecclesiastical parish from Prittlewell in 1842 following the construction of St John the Baptist's Church, it remained part of the civil parish of Prittlewell. In 1866 a local government district called Southend was established just covering the southern part of Prittlewell parish around the nascent town itself. The district was administered by an elected local board with various powers relating to public health and local government.

From 1872 such local government districts were also classed as urban sanitary districts. In 1875 the local board gained powers to purchase Southend Pier.

The Southend district was enlarged in 1877 to cover the whole parish of Prittlewell, which brought Prittlewell village and other areas into the district, including the hamlets of Chalkwell and Milton, both of which subsequently developed into suburbs of Southend, the latter becoming known as Westcliff-on-Sea.

In 1892, Southend was incorporated to become a municipal borough. The borough covered the same area as the old Southend local government district, being the parish of Prittlewell. An inquiry into the proposed incorporation was held in October 1891, at which there was extensive support for the town's incorporation and the extra powers and prestige that would bring. Several people at the inquiry petitioned the government to make the name of the new borough Southend-on-Sea rather than just Southend. A charter of incorporation was issued on 5 August 1892. The charter also confirmed the name of the new borough to be Southend-on-Sea. The borough was then governed by a body formally called the "Mayor, Aldermen and Burgesses of the borough of Southend-on-Sea", generally known as the corporation.

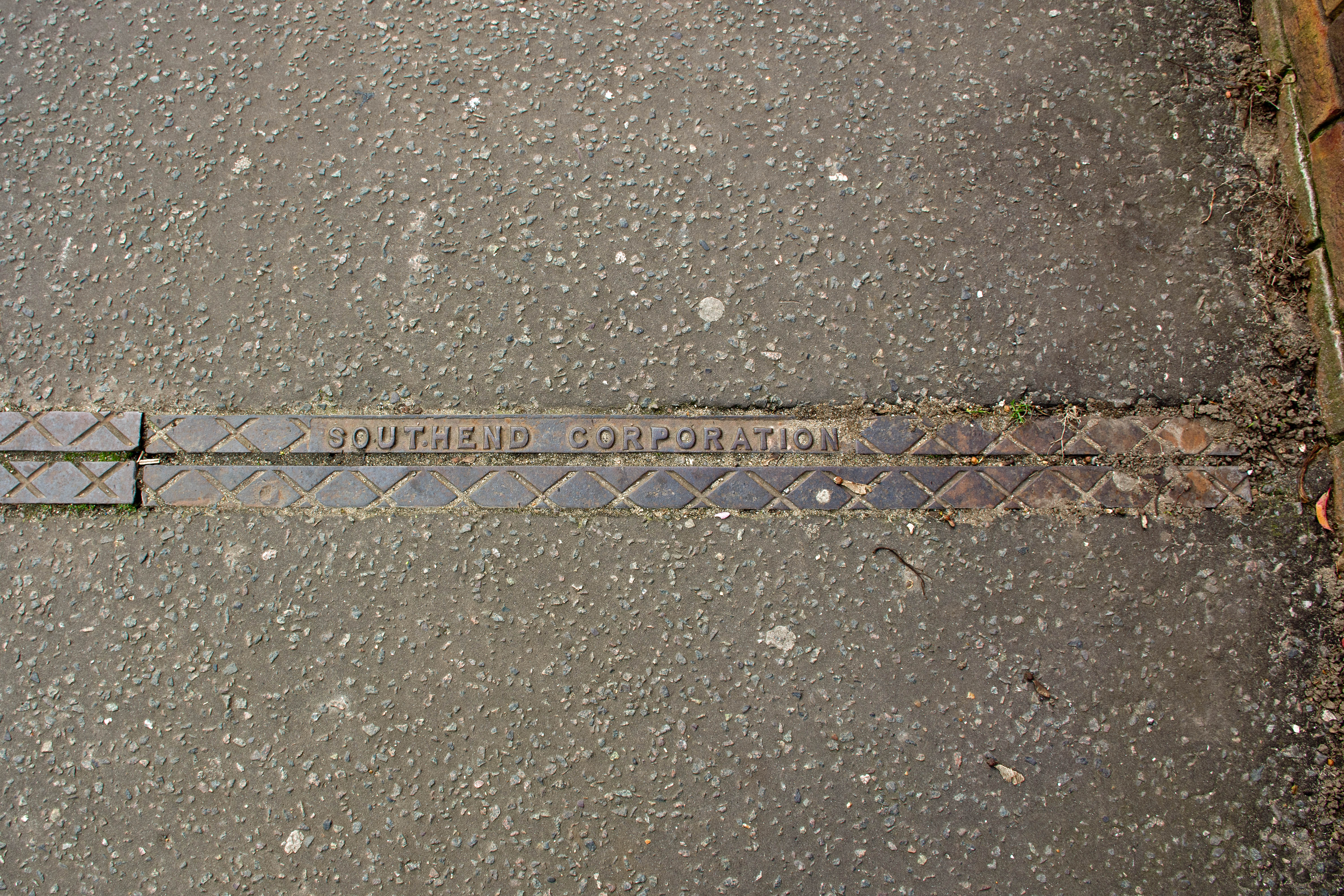
Ironworks on a pavement in Lifstan Way bearing the name "Southend Corporation"

=== Expansion and county borough status gained ===
The parish of Southchurch was absorbed by the borough of Southend-on-Sea on 1 November 1897, after which the borough contained the two parishes of Prittlewell and Southchurch; as urban parishes they were ineligible for parish councils and the corporation was the lowest elected tier of local government.

In 1913, Southend Corporation put forward a bill to the House of Lords in 1913 to gain the status of county borough, which was not objected to by Essex County Council. It also expanded the borough by adding the former area of Leigh-on-Sea Urban District, consisting of the parish of Leigh (1527 acres), and part of the parish of Eastwood (383 acres) from Rochford Rural District. To coincide with the enlargement the civil parishes within the borough were combined to form a single parish of Southend-on Sea. The bill was passed as the Southend-on-Sea Corporation Act 1913 (3 & 4 Geo. 5. c. cv) and the town became a county borough in 1914, taking over county-level local government functions from Essex County Council. The borough remained part of Essex for other purposes such as judicial functions.

In 1933 the borough was expanded by gaining territory of Rochford Rural District consisting of parts of the parishes of Eastwood (1342 acres), Great Wakering (156 acres), North Shoebury (including the village) (499 acres) and Shopland (201 acres). At the same time, the former area of Shoeburyness Urban District, consisting of the parish of South Shoebury (1031 acres) was gained.

=== Council offices ===
The first municipal building in Southend was built in Clarence Road and was completed in 1883. Further offices opened in Alexandra Street, but plans were developed to build a new school, library and town hall on land owned by the council at Victoria Circus. A design by H. T. Hare was chosen, with an estimated price of £16,350, with a grant of £5,000 provided by Essex County Council towards the cost. However, by 1900, these plans fell apart and the library and town hall were dropped from the plans as estimated costs had risen to £27,000. In 1919, land was purchased on the corner of Victoria Avenue and Carnarvon Road to build a new further education college to host both the school of art and the evening class institute, however the site was reassigned to be the home of a new town hall in 1934. Work however did not start on the site until 1960 on the new Southend Civic Centre, which would encompass a new police station (that opened in 1962), a courthouse (that opened in 1966), council offices and chamber, a new College (that opened in 1971) and a Library (that opened in 1974). The planned fire station for the site was dropped and it built in Sutton Road.

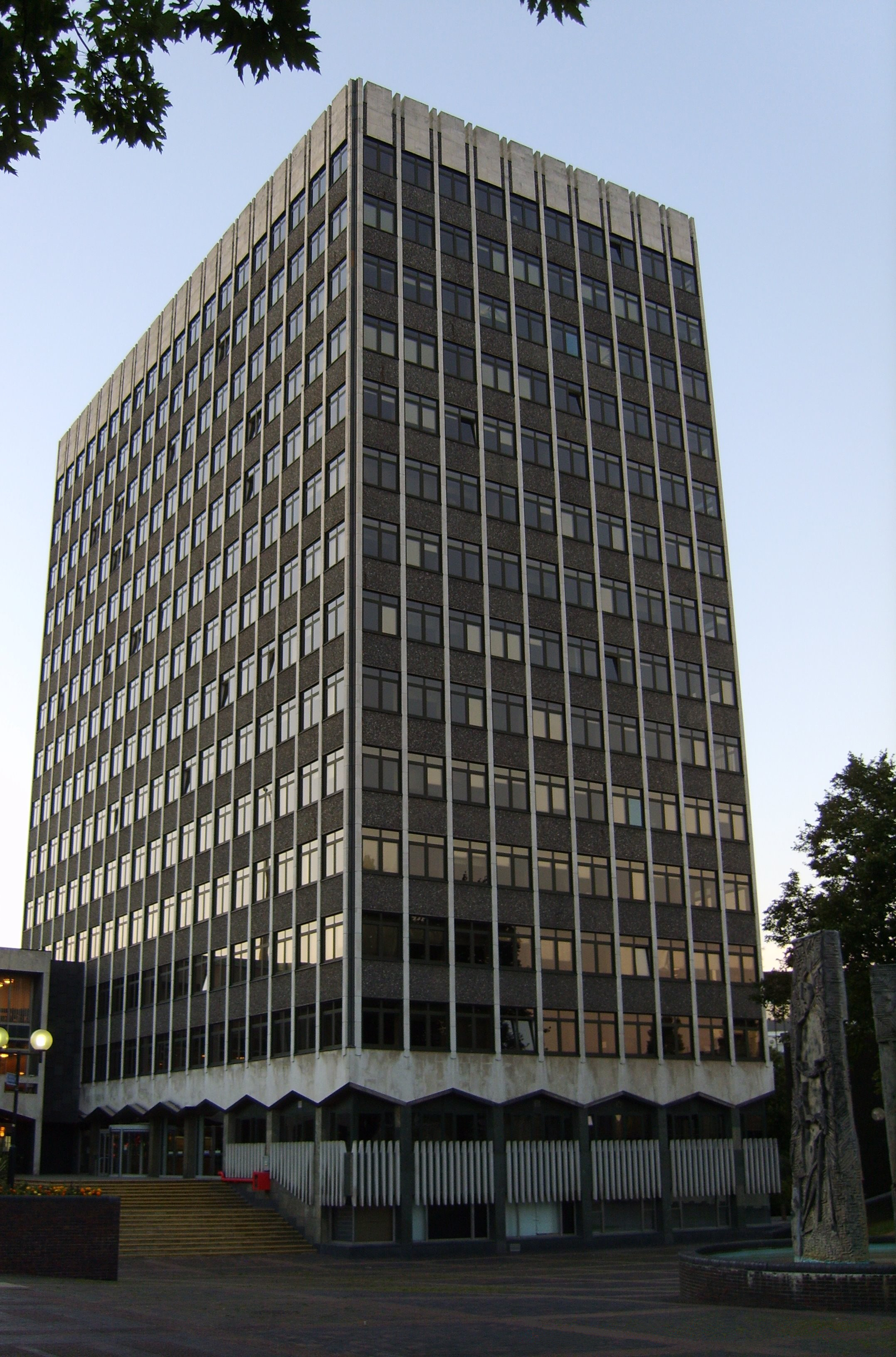
Southend Civic Centre

=== Police force ===
Southend-on-Sea Borough Constabulary was created on 1 April 1914, split off from Essex Constabulary, controlled by Southend Corporation. The first Chief Constable was Henry Maurice Kerskake who had previously held the same role at Dewsbury Borough Police. The force initially had the Kings Crown on their helmets, until January 1915, when they were officially granted to their own. Southend Constabulary could easily be distinguished from other forces as they wore white helmets. On 1 April 1969 the separate borough police force was reincorporated into the Essex police as the Essex and Southend-on-Sea Joint Constabulary, which was renamed Essex Police in 1974.

== Transport ==
Using the powers secured in 1875, the local board was able to purchase Southend Pier, which had its own railway. The borough would go onto to establish its own transport department, providing trams, trolleybus and bus to the town through Southend-on-Sea Corporation Transport.

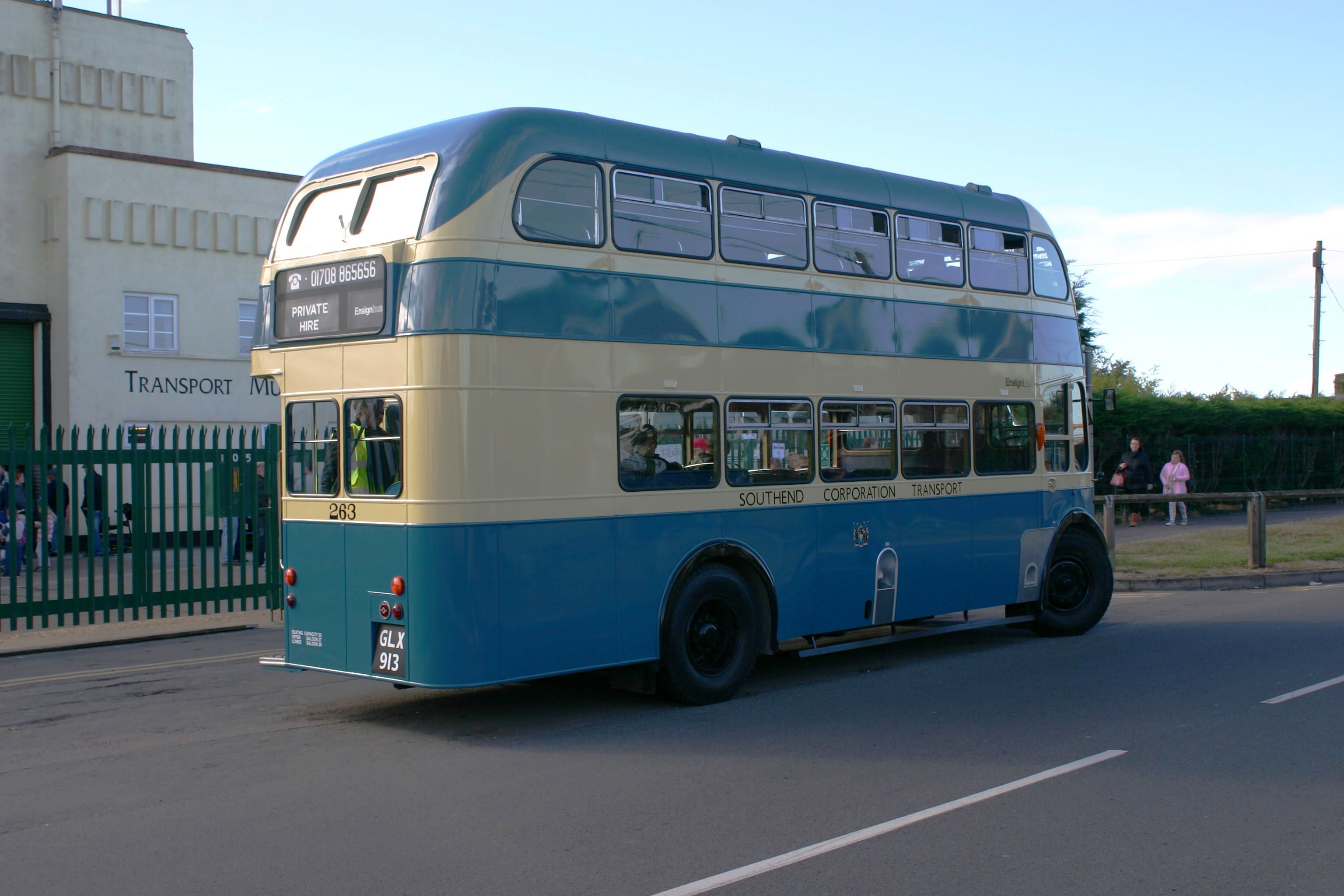
Preserved Southend Corporation bus

== Local Government Act 1972 and replacement bodies ==
The reform of local government outside Greater London which culminated in the Local Government Act 1972 eliminated county boroughs. In their place a two-tier system of counties and districts was created. Two proposals were put forward for Essex and Southend-on-Sea. The first was for Southend on Sea to become a non-metropolitan district with many powers returning to Essex County Council. The second proposal was for a new Thamesside metropolitan county that covered north Kent and south Essex, which would have changed the status of Southend on Sea to a metropolitan district that would have retained many powers locally. The second proposal failed and the first proposal was selected.

The County Borough of Southend on Sea was replaced by the Southend-on-Sea District on 1 April 1974. The council and corporation were replaced by Southend-on-Sea District Council and Essex County Council, which were established as shadow authorities in 1973. The borough's sewage system, that had been run by the county borough, was taken over by the newly formed Anglian Water Authority. The new district had the same boundaries as the county borough. Education, transport, social services, waste disposal and libraries went to Essex County Council with housing, environmental health and waste collection transferred to Southend-on-Sea District Council.

== Coat of arms ==
Coat of arms of County Borough of Southend on Sea
Notes Granted on 1 & 2 January 1915. Crest Issuant out of a mural crown Gules the mast of a ship proper flying therefrom a flag Argent charged with a cross throughout Gules. Escutcheon Azure on a pile Argent between on the dexter an anchor erect on the sinister a grid-iron and in base a trefoil slipped Or a flower vase issuing therefrom a spray of lilies Proper. Supporters On the dexter side a mediaeval fisherman holding a net with his exterior hand all Proper and on the sinister side a Cluniac monk Proper holding in the dexter hand a book Gules and in the exterior hand a staff also Proper. Motto Per Mare Per Ecclesiam (Through The Sea Through The Church)

== Legacy ==
On 1 April 1998 Southend-on-Sea became a unitary authority area and thus independent of Essex County Council again, but still within the ceremonial county of Essex.
