= Southend Civic Centre =

Municipal building in Southend, Essex, England

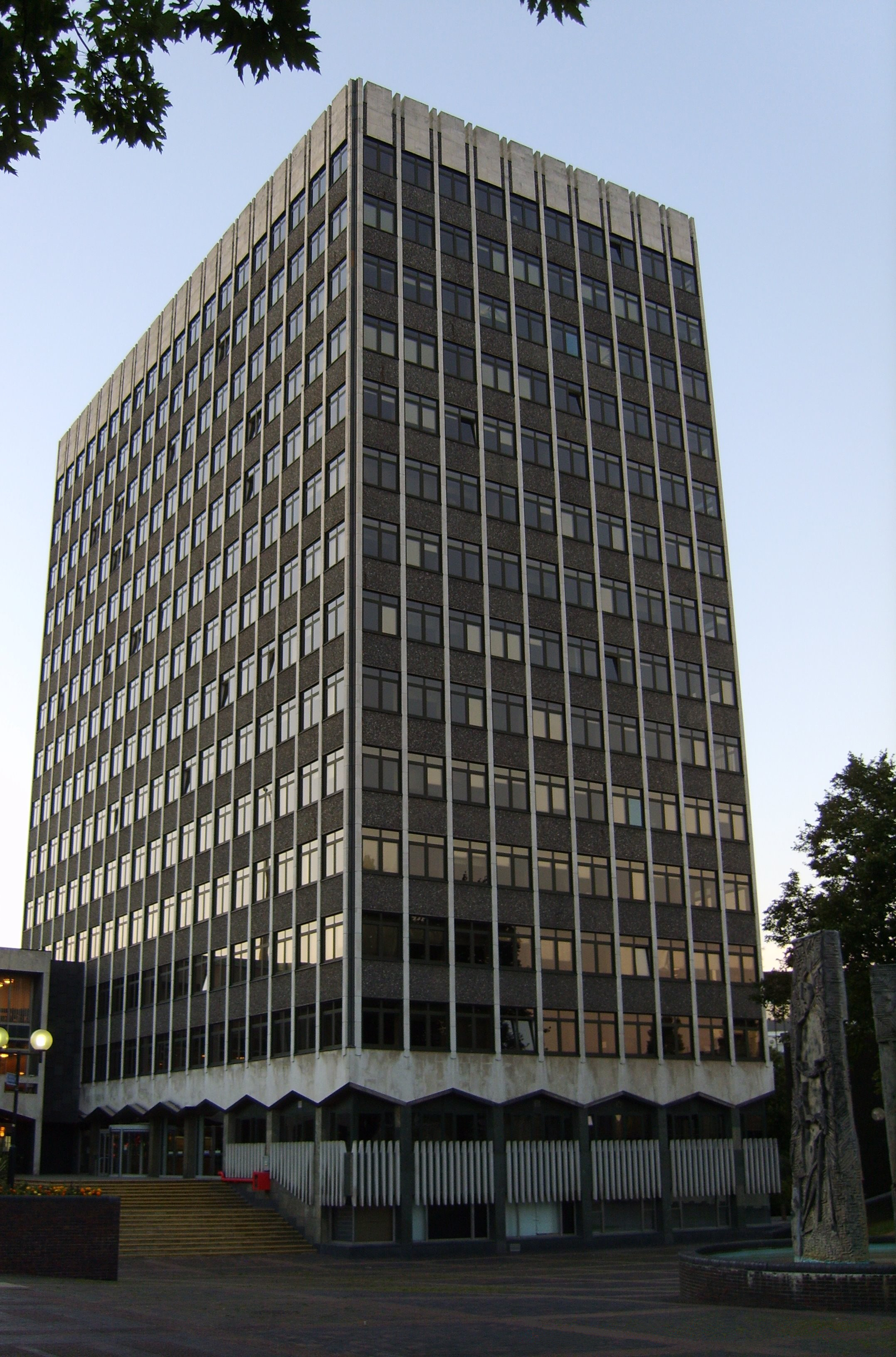
- Southend Civic Centre

- Shown in Essex
- 51.5448°N 0.7089°E
- Location: Victoria Avenue, Southend-on-Sea

History
- Built: 1967

Site notes
- Architect: Patrick Burridge
- Architectural style: International Style

Southend Civic Centre is a municipal building in Victoria Avenue, Southend-on-Sea, Essex, England. It serves as the meeting place for the Southend-on-Sea City Council and houses the council's administrative offices. Initially, the Civic Centre was part of a larger development that included municipal buildings situated between Carnarvon Road and the Southend Central Museum.

== History ==
The first municipal building in Southend was the municipal offices in Clarence Road completed in 1883. Following significant population growth, largely associated with the status of Southend as a seaside resort, the area became a municipal borough in 1892 and a county borough in 1914. As the responsibilities of the council increased, it secured additional office accommodation around Southend, but in the 1940s, the civic leaders decided to co-locate all its staff in one location. The site they selected on the east side of Victoria Avenue was occupied by three large private houses and by the former Westcliff High School, which had been purchased by the council as a planned site for a new further education college. The Civic Centre would encompass a new police station (that opened in 1962), a courthouse (that opened in 1966), council offices and chamber, a new College (that opened in 1971) and a Library (that opened in 1974). The planned fire station for the site was dropped and it built in Sutton Road.

The new buildings were designed by the borough architect, Patrick Burridge, in the International Style. The Council offices and chamber was built in concrete and glass and was officially opened by Queen Elizabeth The Queen Mother on 31 October 1967. The design involved a 16-storey rectangular tower block with 20 bays facing onto Victoria Avenue and 10 bays at either end; the council chamber was contained in a separate two-storey structure built to the south west of the main building.

A fountain, which took the form of three stone slabs located around a stone trough, was designed by William Mitchell and placed in the civic square adjacent to the civic centre at the time of its opening. The three slabs evoked local history by displaying carvings of the borough coat of arms, a local fisherman and a monk from Prittlewell Priory.

The council also commissioned a bronze sculpture entitled "Leda and the Swan" which was designed by Lucette Cartwright. It was initially placed outside the Court House further south along Victoria Avenue but when councillors decided to relocate the sculpture to the civic square there was a backlash from protestors who objected to the sexual nature of the artist's work which depicted the thunder god, Zeus, in the form of a swan, raping a woman. The sculpture was initially moved to the courtyard of the Palace Theatre in Westcliff-on-Sea and but it was later relocated to the mayor's residence where it was placed safely out of view.

A Union Flag, which had been raised at the civic centre on special occasions, including the death of the Queen Mother, was stolen from the civic centre, to much dismay, in April 2002.
