= Beecroft Art Gallery =

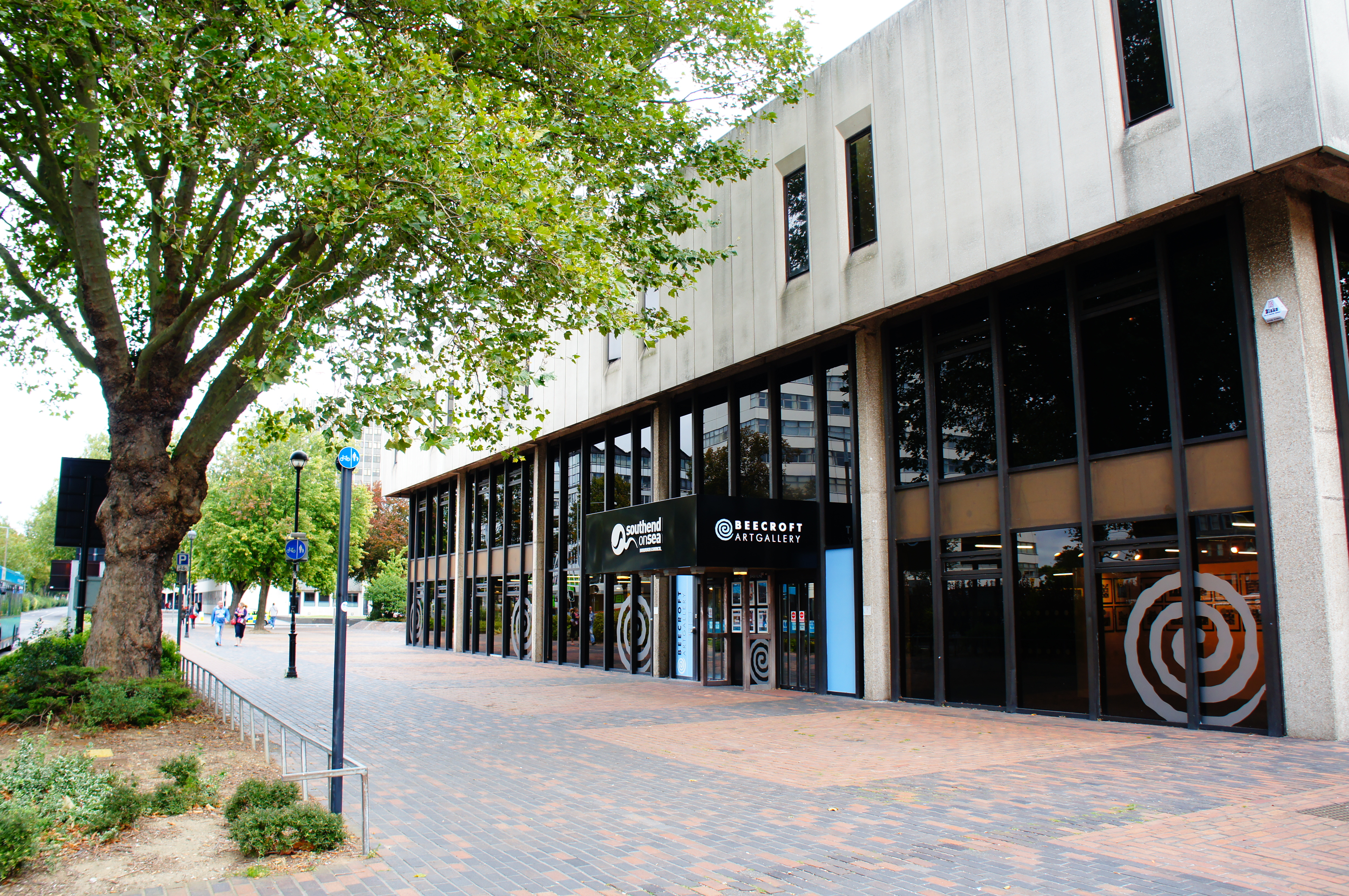
- The Beecroft Art Gallery building

- Location within Essex
- Established: 1952
- Location: Victoria Avenue, Southend-on-Sea
- Coordinates: 51°32′9″N 0°41′50″E
- Type: Art Gallery
- Owner: Southend-on-Sea City Council - Southend Museums
- Website: www.southendmuseums.co.uk/beecroft

Beecroft Art Gallery is an art gallery in Southend-on-Sea, Essex, England. The gallery is housed in the former municipal central library that opened in 1974 in the brutalist style as part of Southend Civic Centre. The Beecroft Art Gallery has a busy programme of changing exhibitions of art, photography and fashion. On the ground floor, the gallery presents temporary exhibitions of modern and contemporary artists, focusing on the work of emerging and established local artists. On the first floor, visitors can see works from the permanent collection and exciting fashion exhibitions. In the basement of the building is the independent charity The Jazz Centre UK.

== History ==
Prior to 2014, the gallery was located in an Edwardian building on Station Road at Westcliff-on-Sea, opposite the Cliffs Pavilion, and which was donated to the people of Southend-on-Sea in 1952 by Walter Beecroft (1885–1961) to house his eclectic collection of art works. Beecroft was a solicitor in nearby Leigh. He had already set up an Art Gallery Sub-Committee of the Public Libraries & Museum Committee in 1928, and in 1947 he proposed to endow a building to become an Art Gallery. Eventually, this led to the Beecroft Art Gallery on Station Road. Beecroft also endowed the Beecroft Bequest, an art purchase fund administered by the Museums Association. The gallery was resited in 2014 to the former home of the Central Library on Victoria Avenue, Southend-on-Sea, when the library moved to The Forum Southend-on-Sea. The move was completed as a temporary measure, as the original building was subsiding, and the council wanted the former library building to stay open. The plan was ultimately to move the gallery to a new museum located on the Cliffs. The Cliffs museum plan was finally dropped in 2018.

== The building ==
The building was designed as a library by the council's architect, Patrick R. Burrough, as part of the new Southend Civic Centre complex. The Civic Complex would encompass a new police station, the courthouse, council offices and chamber, a new College and a Library on a site first purchased by the council in 1919 for a further education college, but had been reallocated as a town hall site in 1934. The planned fire station for the site was dropped and it built in Sutton Road. The Central Library opened in 1974, moving from the former free library located next door which had been opened in 1905.

=== The Fritz Steller wall ===
The most famous feature of the gallery's building is a tiled wall created by Transform, an architectural ceramics company founded by German artist, sculptor and designer Fritz Steller. Transform were commissioned by the council architect's department to create a sculptural wall around 1973, prior to the building opening as Southend Central Library. Transform created a series of architectural ceramic tiles with an abstract design referencing the stacking of book spines on library shelves. The brown tiles were cast using an innovative casting system utilising extruded tiles, resin and sand, which give them a unique and unrepeatable surface Transform Ceramic is also reported to have created the brick paving and the raised planters around the gallery.

== Collections ==
=== Art ===
Beecroft Art Gallery has a permanent collection of over 2,000 works, ranging from 17th-century Dutch paintings to contemporary works. The collection includes examples by artists such as Jan Miense Molenaer, Jacob van Ruisdael, Nicolaes Pieterszoon Berchem, Francesco Bissolo, plus 19th-century artists including Rossetti, Constable and Edward Lear. There are works by Carel Weight, the Great Bardfield Group, and a bronze by Jacob Epstein. The local artist Alan Sorrell is represented by his Drawings of Nubia series depicting a visit to Egypt prior to the building of the Aswan Dam. The Thorpe Smith Collection of local landscape views contains paintings, drawings and prints from as early as 1803.

=== Photography ===
The gallery's photography collection consists mainly of two large collections of 1972 photographs taken in Southend by Ron McCormick and Josef Koudelka. In 1972, as part of a major project involving eight towns, The Arts Council commissioned the two photographers to work in the city with the aim of revealing to the people of Southend how they and their environment are seen by two outside observers. Both photographers found inspiration in the street and beach life that day trippers brought to Southend in the summer. The resulting images were later displayed in the old Beecroft Art Gallery building between 24 March and 22 April 1973 and later toured local schools and community centres. The photographs were then returned to the Beecroft Art Gallery and entered into the collection.

=== Fashion and textiles ===
Southend Museums Service has been acquiring historical and contemporary fashion as part of its social history collection since opening in the 1970s. The collections have subsequently been re-housed at the Beecroft Art Gallery and fashion exhibitions take place there once a year.

The collections' main strengths are the decades from the 1920s to the 1970s but there are important earlier and later pieces, most notably a rare, 17th century slap sole shoe. The collection includes garments, uniforms, shoes, hats, underwear, jewellery and various accessories. Notable collections are the Gloria Levin collection of Hardy Amies couture and a collection of 1970s stage costumes and accessories worn by Dame Vera Lynn.

Beach wear is a major area of collection and the museums service's swimwear collection is believed to be the largest in the country. The collection dates from around 1900 to present times and include several rare pieces. In 2009 Southend Museums received a large donation of 500 bathing suits from private collector, Mavis Plume. It is the largest collection of swimwear in the United Kingdom.

== The Essex Open ==
Beecroft Art Gallery is the home of the historic Essex Open Exhibition, which runs annually. Established by the gallery's founder in 1957 and inspired by the world-renowned Royal Academy Summer Exhibition, over the years, the exhibition has evolved into a cornerstone of the local cultural scene, drawing participants from across Essex and the historic Essex boundaries of East London (today the London boroughs of Barking and Dagenham, Havering, Newham, Redbridge and Waltham Forest).

== The Jazz Centre UK ==
The Jazz Centre UK is an independent charity hosted within the building. It was founded from overstock of the National Jazz Archive by trumpeter Digby Fairweather in 2016 to celebrates the music's heritage, art and memorabilia. The centre is a registered charity, with patrons such as Jamie Cullum, Zoe Rahman and Chris Philips. The centre also promotes contemporary performance and education. Amongst the collections is a Henry Selmer Paris 'Louis Armstrong balanced-action trumpet', which the French company designed in 1933 in collaboration with the great trumpetist, Sir John Dankworth’s first piano and Humphrey Lyttelton's complete archive. The centre was given notice by Southend Council in 2022 that their lease would not be renewed, however in 2024 a new lease was secured. In December 2024, it was announced that Yolanda Charles had joined the board of the charity.

== Additional photographs ==
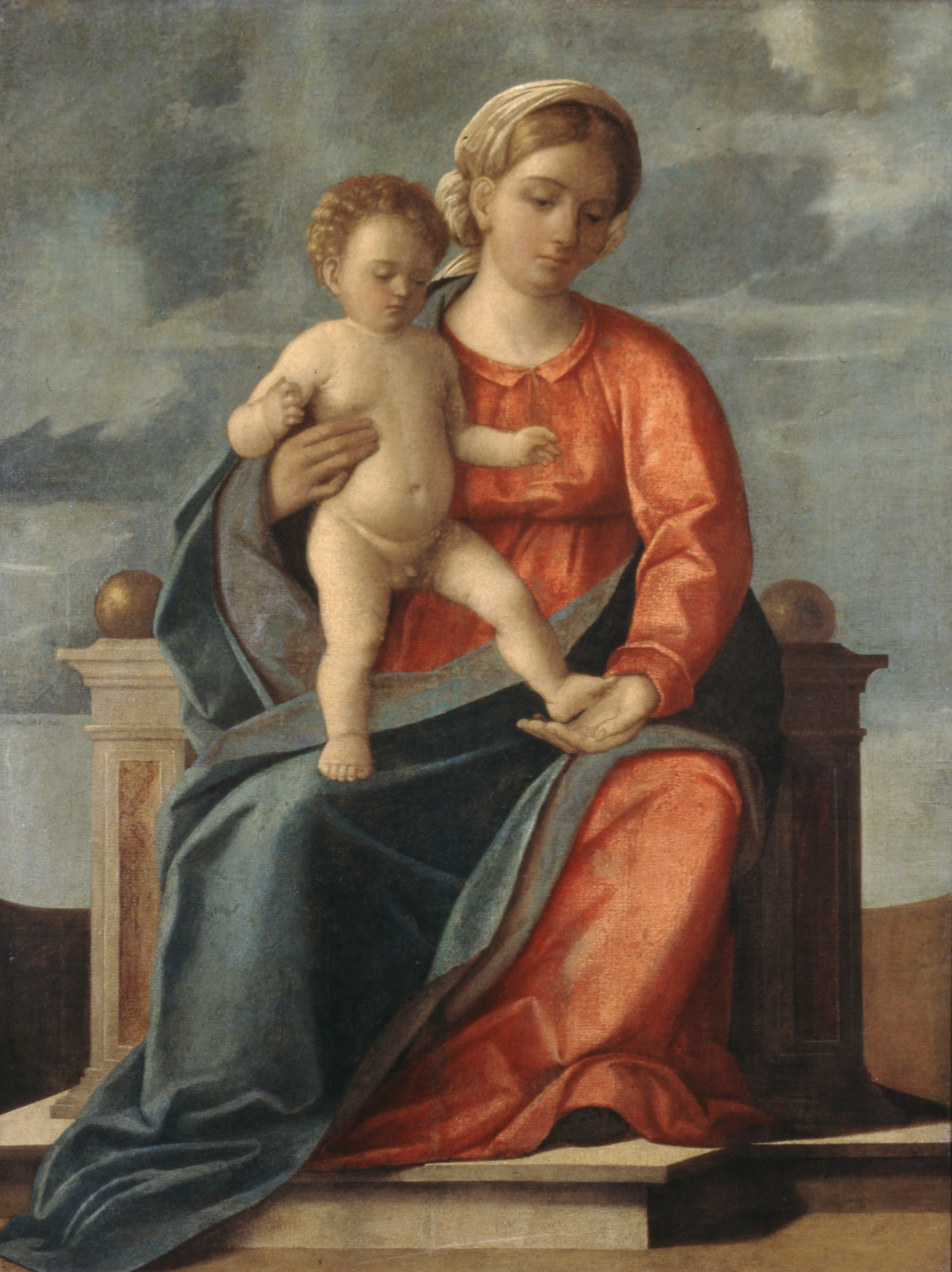
Francesco Bissolo, Mother and Child, Beecroft Art Gallery
