= Walé Adeyemi =

British-Nigerian fashion designer

Walé Adeyemi MBE is a British-Nigerian fashion designer. He has worked as head designer at B-side, former creative director at New Era, an entrepreneur, industry spokesperson, music promoter, ambassador for The Prince's Trust and stylist to celebrities.

His designs have been worn by Beyoncé, Rihanna, Ellie Goulding, Alicia Keys, The Black Eyed Peas, Usher, Missy Elliott, Jourdan Dunn, Estelle, Victoria Beckham, David Beckham, Mos Def, Tinie Tempah, Ms. Dynamite Just Jazz and Joey Badass. British style markets have also used Walé for their brands; Adidas, Caterpillar Inc., Nokia, Martell, Slazenger, Superdrug, Sky and New Era have been clients of Walé.

Adeyemi studied for a BTEC National Diploma in Design (Fashion) at South Essex College between 1990 and 1992, and an HND in Fashion Design at Kent Institute of Art and Design (now University for the Creative Arts) between 1992 and 1994.

The Walé Adeyemi collection debuted in 1998 as a menswear collection. He was presented with the Fashion and Design Award at the Carlton Multi-Cultural Awards in 2001. 2004 saw Adeyemi nominated for the AoC Gold Award, which he won.

In 2005, Walé was noted for his iconic Graffiti Collection at the Victoria and Albert Museum, featuring him in the Moments in Black British Style exhibition. Walé received the Member of the Order of the British Empire (MBE) in the 2008 Birthday Honours for his contribution to British Fashion.
