= Margaret White Wrixon =

British swimmer

Personal information
- Born: January 3, 1944 (age 82) Leigh-on-Sea, England

Sport
- Sport: Swimming

Margaret White-Wrixon (born 3 January 1944) was the first woman to swim the Thames Estuary from Southend to Kent, a feat she completed in 3 hours 5 minutes on 7 August 1960, aged 16. On 25 June 1961, aged 17, she became the first person to complete the Thames Estuary two-way swim, which she did in 6 hours and 40 minutes. She was accompanied on that swim by official observers from Leigh Swimming Club and the historic fishing boat The Endeavour. Also in 1961, she became the youngest person to swim the English Channel, swimming from France to England in 15 hours 8 minutes.

== Early life ==
Margaret White was born in Leigh-on-Sea, Essex, England. Her parents were Vera Doreen Smith and William Henry White, a WW2 veteran Army Air Corps who won a Military Medal for participation in the invasion of Sicily.

She had one brother, John White, career military (deceased 2017).

Margaret White attended Leigh North Street Primary School, Belfairs High School, and then The Southend Municipal College. Studied nursing at the Southend and Rochford Hospitals Group Essex, and Queen Charlottes Maternity Hospital Chiswick London.

At age 5, White joined the Leigh-on-Sea Swimming Club. She swam under the guidance of Melville Chadwick and his wife Doris. She participated in swim meets up to county levels, and excelled in middle-distance swimming. White got many medals and trophies and at age 11 became very interested in the possibility of swimming the English Channel. She started training with her sights set on becoming the youngest person on record. Marilyn Bell from Canada was the record holder at the time.

== Training swims ==
Other swims were achieved before the Channel; all White's training was done in the Thames Estuary, despite the fact that the waters of the Estuary were considered extremely polluted at that time. Swimming was a way of life for young children who lived along the shores of the Thames particularly after the war when many families had fled during the blitz in London. The training involved participating in events organized by the British Long Distance Swimming Association, and other swims organized with the help of others who had already swum the Channel, notably June Gilbert and Michael Jennings.

On 16 August 1959, White undertook the swim from Solent Portsmouth to the Isle of Wight. She succeeded in 3 hrs. 20 mins, and at the time was the youngest, aged just 15, to have achieved it. She also had accompanied Channel Swimmer Dennis Pearson from Rhodesia on his successful Channel crossing with Captain Len Hutchison piloting. In those days of no GPS, her coach had come to trust this famous Dover pilot.

== Swimming the Estuary ==
On 7 August 1960 she swam the Thames Estuary from Southend to Kent in 3hrs.5mins. She was the first woman to have done it, and was aged just 16. She was accompanied on that swim by the famous "Endeavour" fishing boat. On 10 June 1925 Norman Derham had completed a one way swim across the Estuary.

On 27 August 1960 White swam Windermere in 7 hours 26 minutes. It was a British Long Distance Swimming Association (BLDSA) race, and age 16, she came second, finding the lake quite a challenge. For a salt water swimmer, the lack of buoyancy was difficult to overcome.

On 25 June 1961 White completed the Thames Estuary two-way swim. Southend to Kent and return, in 6 hours 40 minutes. She was the first person to accomplish this, at the age of 17. She was accompanied by official observers from Leigh Swimming Club and the historic fishing boat "The Endeavour". As White says, "Swimming across the Thames Estuary two ways is difficult as one has to contemplate the tides. The outgoing tide is difficult to swim against and one had to swim fast enough to time getting there and back on the one tide otherwise there is a danger of being stranded on the return. My swim found me walking across the mud flats approx. 100 yards from the Leigh tow path, which runs along the shoreline." At the time this swim was recognized by the BLDSA, when the organization was in its infancy. Author Caitlin Davies has included information on the swim on her blog for the Museum of London, including photos of White.

The swim was accomplished without any aids using the Channel Swimming Association and the BLDSA rules. The port of London Authorities was notified in advance.

== Swimming The Channel ==
On 2 September 1961, she became the youngest person to swim the English Channel from France to England in 15hrs 8mins.

== Other life ==
In January 1962 White started SRN and Midwifery training at the Southend Rochford Hospital Group.

In August 1965 she commenced a one-year contract with the Zambian Government working as a nursing sister in the non-fee paying Lusaka Central Hospital in Zambia.

She then travelled extensively through Africa during and after this tour of duty. Rhodesia, South Africa, Swaziland, Mozambique, Malawi, Tanzania, Zanzibar, Kenya, Congo and Ethiopia. White joined the Zambian Flying Doctor Service headed and founded by Dr.James Lawless and his wife Margaret, working with a group of nurses and doctors to establish clinics in the remote areas of Zambia. The service still in existence. Dr. Lawless moved on to Australia where he set up another Flying Doctor Service.

White went to Montreal in November 1969, and stayed for 15 years, working first at the Montreal General and Jewish General Hospitals as an Emergency Room nurse, until changing careers.

Between 1975 and 1986 she worked for Prudential Assurance Company, Life, disability, pension and group sales. She became a Member of The Million Dollar Round Table club in 1977. She then formed Margaret White & Associates.

Margaret White married George Wrixon in 1983, moved to Toronto in 1984 and had a son Phillip, born 1985.

She retired in 2005.

White-Wrixon is currently living in Oakville, Ontario, close to Lake Ontario, where she manages family pension with husband and works as a community volunteer within the community with high risk and palliative care individuals.
