= The Forum Southend-on-Sea =

Public library in Southend-on-Sea, Essex, England

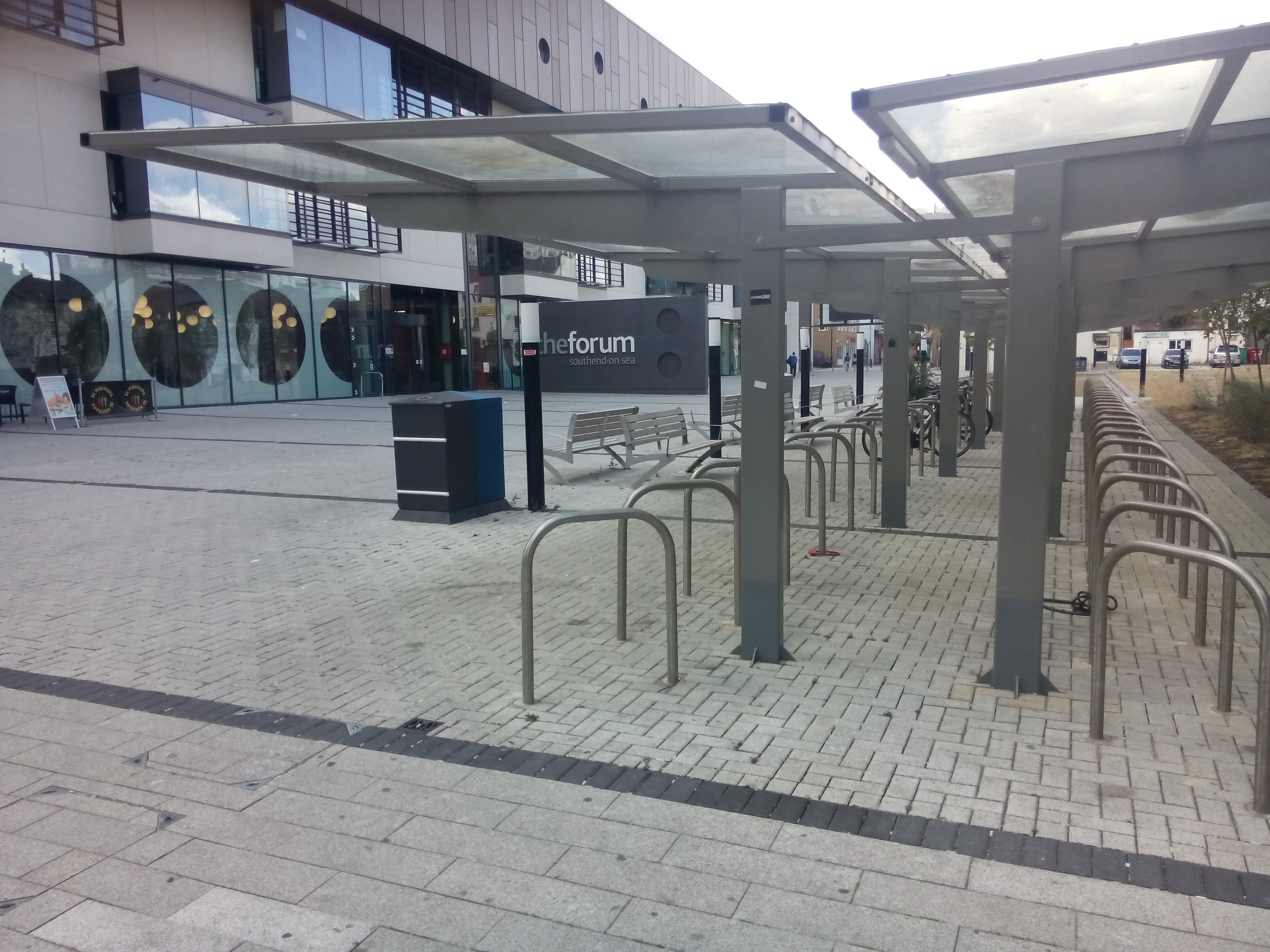
- 51.538788°N 0.711032°E
- Location: Southend-on-Sea, Essex, United Kingdom
- Established: 2013

Other information
- Website: www.theforumsouthend.co.uk

The Forum Southend-on-Sea, locally known simply as The Forum, is a building located in Southend-on-Sea, Essex, England. The Central Library and Focus Art Gallery are housed in the building. It was opened in September 2013 following a relocation from the former building of Southend Central Library on Victoria Avenue which now houses the Beecroft Art Gallery. Membership for the library is free.

== Development ==
The building's construction was funded by the Southend-on-Sea Borough Council, the University of Essex and South Essex College, each putting forward £12.5 million, £10.4 million and £4 million respectively.
