= Southchurch High School =

Coordinates: 51.54205°N 0.75009°E

Location
- Southchurch Boulevard; Southend-on-Sea, Essex, RG45 7EG; England

Information
- Type: Academy
- Motto: "A community of opportunity, learning and aspiration"
- Established: 2016
- Local authority: Southend-on-Sea
- Department for Education URN: 143144 Tables
- Ofsted: Reports
- Principal/Head Teacher: Tracy Airoll
- Deputy Headteacher: Selina Murray
- Gender: Mixed
- Age: 11 to 16
- Enrolment: 794 (October 2024)
- Average class size: 30
- Houses: Dragon; Griffin; Pegasus; Phoenix
- Color: Dark Blue / White
- Mascot: Swan
- Website: https://www.southchurchschool.com/

Southchurch High School is a coeducational secondary school located in Southend-on-Sea, Essex, England. It opened on 1 September 2016, replacing the former Futures Community College. The school has had several previous iterations, having originally formed as Southchurch Hall School back in 1904.

== Early history ==
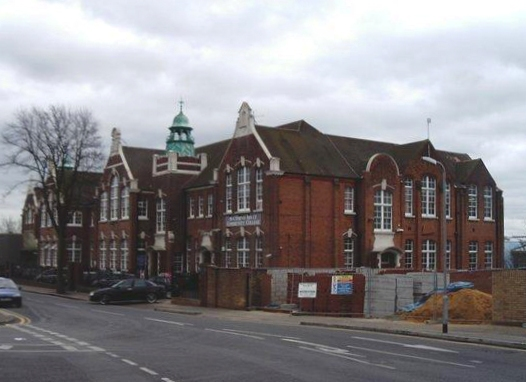
The original home of Southchurch Hall School, now Southend Adult Community College

Originally opened as Southchurch Hall School in Ambleside Drive in 1904, after the newly formed Essex County Council Education Committee took control of schools in Southend-on-Sea from the former Prittlewell School Board after the Education Act 1902. The current building was built to the designs of the Southend-based architects, Burles and Harris, in 1910. It was separated into boys, girls, junior mixed and infants' departments, but in 1914 control of the school was returned to Southend Borough Council. In 1934, the under 11 aged pupils were moved out to either the new Thorpe Junior School or to the existing Brewery Road School (now Porters Grange), while Southchurch Hall School was renamed Southchurch Hall Schools for Girls and Boys. During World War II, the school and its pupils were evacuated to Nottinghamshire.

Due to the growth in student numbers, the girls were moved to the former site of Southend High School for Girls in Boston Avenue in 1957 and given the new name of Dowsett High School for Girls. However Dowsett High School moved to the present site in Southchurch in 1966, where they continued to operate until 1981, when Southchurch Hall High School for Boys moved from Ambleside Drive to the same site, re-amalgamating back with the girls school and taking on the new name of Thorpe Bay High School. The former site in Ambleside Drive would become the home for Southend's Adult Education College in 1992.

== From Thorpe Bay High to Futures Community School ==
Thorpe Bay High School was first put into special measures by OFSTED in 1999. In 2005, Southend Borough Council put forward plans to merge Prittlewell Technology College with Thorpe Bay High School. Prittlewell had been put into special measures in the summer of 2004 and the council wanted to try and improve the situation at both schools. The planned merger included operating a lower school from the Prittlewell site, and the upper school from the Southchurch premises. The plan did not materialise after a campaign by parents, and alternatives were sort.

In 2006, an alternative was found by the creation of a new trustee school by Southend-on-Sea Borough Council, Prospects College and the UK government to try and lift Thorpe Bay High School out of special measures. The school was rebranded as Futures Community College, and a new building was opened in 2010 with Prospects moving their Southend campus from Fairfax Drive to share the new building.

In November 2013, the head teacher was Stuart Reynolds replacing Stephen Capper, who had been appointed for one year to prevent the school being placed in special measures by Ofsted following poor examination results in 2012. However the school returned to special measures in 2014 before coming out in 2016. As part of its rebuilding programme Futures closed its Sixth form in 2015, with PROCAT (the new name for Prospects College) moving out in 2016 to make room for further expansion of the school.

== The return of Southchurch High School ==
In September 2016 the school renamed itself as Southchurch High School and became part of the Partnership Learning Academy trust.

The OFSTED inspection in March 2023 had seen the school return to special measures, which resulted in new headteacher Tracey Airoll being appointed. On the return visit in December 2023 the school was graded as Requires Improvement by OFSTED and so therefore again left special measures.
