= Beauchamps High School =

Location
- Beauchamps Drive, Wickford SS11 8LY; Wickford, Essex, SS11 8LY; England; 51°36′47″N 0°32′31″E

Information
- Type: Foundation school
- Motto: The Beauchamps Community is a Family in which everyone aspires to achieve their best ...and beyond!
- Established: 1959
- Local authority: Essex
- Department for Education URN: 115322 Tables
- Ofsted: Reports
- The Headteacher: Mathew Harper
- Staff: 65
- Gender: Coeducational
- Age: 11 to 18
- Enrolment: 1303
- Website: Official website

Beauchamps High School is a mixed intake secondary school and sixth form for students aged between 11 and 18 (school years 7 to 13) in Wickford, Essex, England. The sixth form offers post 16 education for students aged 16–18 and accepts both former Beauchamps students and students educated at other establishments. The school includes a fairly diverse student population. The current headteacher of the school is Mr Mat Harper. The previous head was Mr Robert Hodges.

== History ==
The school is located in the town of Wickford in Essex, England, and moved to its present site in 1959. The school was called Beauchamps Grant Maintained School until 1999, when its name was changed to Beauchamps High School. In 2003 it acquired a specialist status as a Business and Enterprise school, and in 2008 it obtained a Vocational status.

== Academics ==
According to the school's website, in 2007, 60% of A-level passes were at Grades A to C, and 86% of students (a new school record) achieved 5 GCSEs at Grades A* to C. The School was given an outstanding report by Ofsted in December 2006.

In 2010 92% of students achieved 5 GCSEs at grades A*-C and a 98% pass rate (66% A-C) at A-level which are improvements on previous records.

== Notable former pupils ==
- Andy Coulson – former editor of the News of the World
- Tony Way – comedy actor/writer
