= PROCAT =

Coordinates: 51.5809°N 0.4487°E

PROCAT was a further education college based in Basildon, Essex, England, with an additional campus in Canvey Island. PROCAT is an acronym of "Prospect College of Advanced Technology", and the college specialises in engineering and construction training. In 2018, it merged with South Essex College and is now is a brand name for their provision.

== History ==
PROCAT was started in 1969 by the Engineering Industry Training Board (EITB) as SENTRA to train engineering apprentices. They were originally located at 83 Vanguard Way, Shoeburyness before opening a further site at Fairfax Drive, Southend-on-Sea.

During the 1990s SENTRA started using the trading name Prospects Training and moved into further training areas including Construction.

During the 00s Prospects purchased the Pegasus Training Centre in Basildon, and changed the company name to Prospects Learning Foundation, trading as Prospects College. They then initially took over as trustees of Thorpe Bay School in Southend in 2006, moving its Southend centre to this location in 2010 and rebranding it Futures Community College. In 2007 they moved into new premises in Crompton Close, Basildon.

In 2012 a new £10m centre in Basildon was opened next door to the existing Basildon centre. This was followed by a further centre on Canvey Island in 2013.

In 2015 Prospects College become the first new incorporated FE college in 20 years and was rebranded PROCAT. In January 2016 it was announced that the Southend Centre would close for the expansion of Futures College.

In March 2017 it was announced that PROCAT had won the contract to manage the Transport for London Tunnelling & Underground Construction Academy (TUCA) which had originally been setup by the Crossrail project.

In May 2018 PROCAT was told by the FE commissioner that they were unlikely to be able to deal with their financial difficulties alone and were told to merge by the end of 2018. In June 2018, David Sherlock, chairman of PROCAT announced that they had agreed to merge with South Essex College but stay an independent brand within the group specializing in technical, engineering and construction training. The new Stephenson Road campus of South Essex College was opened under the PROCAT brand.
