= Chase High School =

Location
- Prittlewell Chase; Westcliff-on-Sea, Essex, SS0 0RT; England; 51.552633°N 0.684713°E

Information
- Type: Academy
- Motto: Ambition, Resilience, Kindness
- Established: 2006, on the site of former Prittlewell Technology College
- Local authority: Southend-on-Sea
- Department for Education URN: 141741 Tables
- Ofsted: Reports
- Headteacher: Matthew Suttenwood
- Gender: Coeducational
- Age: 11 to 18
- Enrolment: 1,318 (as of 2025)
- Houses: Emerald; Ruby; Topaz; Sapphire
- Colour: Blue / White
- Website: www.chasehigh.org

Chase High School is a coeducational secondary school and sixth form, in Westcliff-on-Sea, Essex, England.

== Pre-Chase history ==
In 1913, Westborough School opened in MacDonald Avenue, Westcliff-on-Sea with Infants, Senior Boys and Senior Girls departments. Sixteen years later, Southend Borough Council opened the Junior Day Department at Fairfax Drive which specialised in technical and commercial subjects, but in 1934 it was moved to the Municipal College site at Victoria Circus and Fairfax Senior Mixed School was opened at the site. During the war, Westborough School was evacuated to Chapel-en-le-Frith in Derbyshire, while Fairfax Senior Mixed School was evacuated to Swadlincote in Derbyshire.

In 1945 Westborough School Senior department was renamed Westborough Senior Mixed School, however in 1953 both Fairfax and Westborough were transformed into single sex schools, with Westborough taking the girls from Fairfax, and Fairfax the boys from Westborough. With this change, the schools were renamed as Westborough High School for Girls and Fairfax High School for Boys. In 1966, Westborough High moved to the former Southend High School and Dowsett High School for Girls site in Boston Avenue, leaving just the primary school at MacDonald Avenue. However in 1987, both Fairfax and Westborough High schools merged to form Prittlewell High School which was later renamed Prittlewell Technology College.

Prittlewell Technology College was put into special measures by OFSTED in the summer of 2004, with the head teacher Maggie Sanders resigning in June. In 2005, Southend Borough Council proposed a plan to merge Prittlewell with Thorpe Bay High School, who had been in special measures for six years.The planned merger included operating a lower school from the Prittlewell site, and the upper school from the Southchurch premises. The plan did not materialise after a campaign by parents, and alternatives were sort.

== History of Chase High School ==
Chase High School opened in September 2006 as a fresh start school on the site of the former Prittlewell Technology College, and opened a new extension in April 2009, which included dance and drama studios, an independent learning centre and a cafeteria which featured fingerprint recognition for students making purchases.

The school converted to academy status in September 2015, becoming part of the Discovery Educational Trust (previously Brentwood Academies Trust). In 2022, the school was inspected by Ofsted and received its first good rating, having previously been rated inadequate or requiring improvement. Ofsted returned in 2025 and found the school 'inadequate', finding that girls at the school did not feel safe and were at risk of harmful sexual behaviour. The headteacher, Matt Suttenwood, made a 33-page complaint, stating the school was "upset, frustrated, and angry" with the conduct of the visit and the report’s content, and left staff "shaking and questioning their careers".

== Sports facilities ==
The school has a small playing field that is marked during the winter and spring term with a rugby pitch, and an athletics track during the summer term. There is a large outside hard-surface area that holds 5 tennis courts and 4 netball courts, and a multi-use indoor sports hall marked for one 5-a-side football court, one basketball court, four badminton courts, one volleyball court and two cricket nets.

The school also has a partnership with PlayFootball Southend; this is a brand-new £2m, purpose-built football venue that opened in 2007.

There are 8 outdoor floodlit 5-a-side pitches and a full-size training pitch that can also be split into 4x 7-a-side or 2x 9-a-side pitches, all equipped with an artificial 3rd generation, rubber crumb cushioned compound surface. The same surface is used by Liverpool, Real Madrid and Bayern Munich's training academies.
