= Thurrock and Basildon College =

Location
- Woodview Campus; Grays, Essex, RM16 2YR; England
- Coordinates: 51.48526°N 0.35483°E

Information
- Type: Further education college
- Closed: 2010
- Local authority: Thurrock
- Department for Education URN: 133436 Tables
- Gender: Coeducational
- Age: 16+
- Website: http://www.tab.ac.uk

Thurrock and Basildon College was a further education college in Grays, Essex, England (Woodview Campus) and Basildon, Essex, England (Nethermayne Campus). It was formed by the merger of Thurrock Technical College and Basildon College. The college merged with South East Essex College of Arts and Technology on 1 January 2010 to form South Essex College.

The Nethermayne Campus of Basildon college opened on 13 September 1971.
