= South Essex College =

Further education college based in Essex County, England

Coordinates: 51.5378°N 0.7111°E

South Essex Colleges Group

Information
- Type: Further Education College
- Established: 1899
- Department for Education URN: 130672 Tables
- Ofsted: Reports
- Group Chief Executive: Denise Brown
- Principal: Brad Brooks (Thurrock); John Newton (Basildon); Nicki Kelly (Southend)
- Gender: Mixed
- Age: 16+
- Enrolment: 6,400 as of October 2024
- Website: https://www.southessex.ac.uk/

South Essex College of Further and Higher Education or simply South Essex College, trading as South Essex Colleges Group (SECG), is a college of further education, higher education and adult education in South Essex, England. It has six campuses based across Thurrock, Basildon and Southend-on-Sea along the Thames Estuary.

== History ==
The Technical Instruction Act 1889 and Technical Instruction 1891 allowed councils to provide evening classes for technical subjects. The local board set up the Technical Instruction Committee, and soon classes were started. They were extremely popular, and the following year the newly created Southend Corporation purchased land in Clarence Road to build a Technical Institute. In 1895 the foundation stone was laid, but prior to it opening it was decided to also open a day technical school for about 20 pupils, influenced by the Bryce commission of 1894. The first headmaster was J. Hitchcock from Woolwich and was supported by one assistant teacher. A one day a week Art school was opened, which by 1899 was a fully organised college.

The new building however was quickly outgrown, with 72 pupils at the day technical school by 1896, mirroring the growth of the town. The Technical Instruction Committee urged the Council to build a new school in 1896, with pupil numbers expected to grow to 400 by 1907. Unfortunately the vote by the council was 10 for and 10 against. However, plans were developed to build a new school, library and town hall on land owned by the council at Victoria Circus. A design by H. T. Hare was chosen, with an estimated price of £16,350, with a grant of £5,000 provided by Essex County Council towards the cost. However by 1900, these plans fell apart and the library and town hall were dropped from the plans as estimated costs had risen to £27,000. In 1901, the foundation stone was laid by Lord Avebury, and a year later the joint Technical Institute and Day Technical School was opened by the Countess of Warwick.

By 1905, an extension was added to cope with the demand of both the day technical school and the college of art which was located on the top floor. In 1907, Essex County Council formed a new Higher Education committee, who decided that education should be split into separate boys and girls schools. In 1912, a foundation stone was laid in Boston Avenue for a new girls school, and a year later the girls left the Day Technical School to the new Southend High School for Girls. The Day Technical School was renamed as Southend High School for Boys. In 1914, Southend became a County Borough, taking charge of all education in the town, including the High School, School of Art and the Evening class institute all located still in the same building. After the war the number of pupils increased, so in 1919 the School of Art moved out of the top floor to make room for the High School, into temporary wooden buildings at the rear of the building. Land was purchased on the corner of Victoria Avenue and Carnarvon Road to build a new further education college to host both the school of art and the evening class institute. However, the site purchased by the council on the corner of Victoria Avenue and Carnarvon Road was reassigned to be the home of a new town hall in 1934.

In 1922, the School of Art grew by adding a School of Architecture run by architect Douglas Niel Martin-Kaye. The School of Art would become the nucleus of the newly formed Southend Technical and Commercial School. A Junior Technical department was opened at Fairfax Drive in 1929, but moved to Victoria Circus in 1934 to make way for Fairfax Senior Mixed School, and in 1935 the Technical and Commercial school was renamed Southend Municipal College, who took over the whole site after Southend High School for Boys moved to Prittlewell Chase in 1938. The college was restructured in 1963 to include in its teaching commercial and industrial skills for education in courses like plumbing, and renamed as the Southend College of Technology. The School of Architecture was closed by the College governors in 1966, with students having to be transferred elsewhere with the aid of the Royal Institute of British Architects finding them places. In 1969, the college moved from Victoria Circus to a new site at Carnarvon Road next to the Civic Centre, with the old building demolished shortly after.

The college became South East Essex College of Arts and Technology (SEECAT) in 1991. In 2004, the college relocated to a £52 million campus in the centre of Southend, close to main public transport routes and right next to the High Street and mainline railway station. The college formally merged with Thurrock and Basildon College on 1 January 2010 and was renamed South Essex College.

In 2013 The Forum Southend-on-Sea opened which has a dedicated South Essex College area on the third floor. In 2014 the Thurrock campus relocated to a £45 million building in the centre of Grays. During the build, fraudsters intercepted payments totalling £1.4 million that were meant for the building contractors, with the resulting court case being thrown out due to the "incompetence" of the National Crime Agency.

In June 2018 it was announced that South Essex College would merge with PROCAT, a specialist engineering and construction provider based in Basildon, Canvey Island and Ilford. The new Stephenson Road campus of South Essex College was opened under the PROCAT brand. In 2021, a new campus was opened in the former market square in Basildon, replacing the previous campus on Nethermayne.

In December 2021, it was announced that South Essex College had won Institute of Technology status in wave two in part of a government education plan to improve higher technical training in subjects such as advanced manufacturing, digital and cyber security, aerospace and healthcare.

In November 2022, South Essex College was restructured into a partnership of three distinct colleges with local leadership teams and different curriculums specialised to reflect the skills needs of their respective communities, including Thurrock College, Southend City College and Basildon College. The colleges have their own leadership teams and principals but remain united under a single governing body of executives.

== Courses ==
South Essex College's Further Education provision includes a wide range of A-levels and vocational courses such as BTECs and apprenticeships. The college offers a range of higher education course including degrees, HNCs and HNDs. Programmes are validated by University of the Arts London and Pearson. The college also offers services to businesses through its Business Development Team and offers apprenticeship training.

== Campuses ==
=== Main Southend Campus ===
The main Southend Campus is located in Southend-on-Sea town centre, next to Southend Central railway station.

The college's building in Southend was featured in the Learning and Skills Council publication 'World Class Buildings – Design Quality in Further Education' in March 2005 and ‘Better Buildings, Better Design, Better Education’ published by the Department for Education and Skills in 2007. It won a British Constructional Steelwork Association Structural Steel Award and was a finalist in the RIBA/LSC Further Education Awards in 2006.

The College has purpose-built sports facilities at Wellstead Gardens in Westcliff-on-Sea, with a gym and playing fields for team sports.

The Southend Campus played host to a world record attempt in 2014 where two students tried to break the longest radio show broadcast record. The pair were on air for 88 hours.

=== Stephenson Road Southend ===
The Motor Vehicle, Engineering and Construction Centre at Stephenson Road Campus opened in 2018 and carrying both signage for South Essex College, and its Engineering sub brand PROCAT.

=== Thurrock Campus ===
In 2014 the Thurrock Campus relocated to a £45 million building in the centre of Grays. The campus has specialist workshops linked to courses for construction, engineering, media and creative arts in addition to facilities for logistics, childcare, health and social care and courses. There is an outdoor amphitheatre.

=== The Forum Southend-on-Sea ===
The Forum Southend-on-Sea is a £27 million library and learning zone located opposite the Southend Campus. South Essex College is a partner in this venture with the University of Essex and Southend Council. The Forum houses a library collection on the first floor and a dedicated South Essex College area on the third floor. As well as hosting most of Higher Education resources, The Forum supports the delivery of the college's HE courses. and Wi-Fi access. Other areas in the Forum include a University of Essex floor, the Focal Point Art Gallery, a 200-seat lecture theatre and refreshment facilities.

=== Centre for Digital Technologies, Basildon ===
The Centre for Digital Technologies opened in 2021 and is located in Basildon Town Centre.

=== Luckyn Lane Campus, Basildon ===
Originally home to PROCAT, which merged with South Essex College in 2018. It offers Engineering, Construction, Building Services and Transport courses. It is located on the Pipps Hill Industrial Estate.

== Notable alumni ==
- Walé Adeyemi, British-Nigerian fashion designer
- James Bourne, singer in Busted/McBusted
- Ricky Champ, EastEnders actor
- Dave Gahan, singer, composer and vocalist from Depeche Mode
- Toby Gard, creator of Lara Croft
- Ross Kemp, BAFTA award-winning actor
- Alison Moyet, singer
- Ethan Payne (Behzinga), YouTuber, co-founding member of the Sidemen
- Maisie Smith, EastEnders actress
- Margaret White Wrixon, long distance swimmer and for 2 years the youngest person to swim the English Channel

== See also ==
- South East Essex Technical College
