= Southend-on-Sea City Council elections =

English local government elections

Southend-on-Sea City Council, formerly known as Southend-on-Sea Borough Council, is the local authority for the unitary authority of Southend-on-Sea in Essex, England. Until 1 April 1998 it was a non-metropolitan district.

== Council elections ==
=== Non-metropolitan district elections ===
- 1973 Southend-on-Sea Borough Council election
- 1976 Southend-on-Sea Borough Council election (New ward boundaries)
- 1978 Southend-on-Sea Borough Council election
- 1979 Southend-on-Sea Borough Council election
- 1980 Southend-on-Sea Borough Council election
- 1982 Southend-on-Sea Borough Council election
- 1983 Southend-on-Sea Borough Council election
- 1984 Southend-on-Sea Borough Council election
- 1986 Southend-on-Sea Borough Council election
- 1987 Southend-on-Sea Borough Council election
- 1988 Southend-on-Sea Borough Council election
- 1990 Southend-on-Sea Borough Council election
- 1991 Southend-on-Sea Borough Council election
- 1992 Southend-on-Sea Borough Council election
- 1994 Southend-on-Sea Borough Council election
- 1995 Southend-on-Sea Borough Council election
- 1996 Southend-on-Sea Borough Council election

=== Unitary authority elections ===
- 1997 Southend-on-Sea Borough Council election
- 1999 Southend-on-Sea Borough Council election
- 2000 Southend-on-Sea Borough Council election
- 2001 Southend-on-Sea Borough Council election (New ward boundaries increased the number of seats by 12)
- 2002 Southend-on-Sea Borough Council election
- 2003 Southend-on-Sea Borough Council election
- 2004 Southend-on-Sea Borough Council election
- 2006 Southend-on-Sea Borough Council election
- 2007 Southend-on-Sea Borough Council election
- 2008 Southend-on-Sea Borough Council election
- 2010 Southend-on-Sea Borough Council election
- 2011 Southend-on-Sea Borough Council election
- 2012 Southend-on-Sea Borough Council election
- 2014 Southend-on-Sea Borough Council election
- 2015 Southend-on-Sea Borough Council election
- 2016 Southend-on-Sea Borough Council election
- 2018 Southend-on-Sea Borough Council election
- 2019 Southend-on-Sea Borough Council election
- 2021 Southend-on-Sea Borough Council election
- 2022 Southend-on-Sea Borough Council election
- 2023 Southend-on-Sea City Council election
- 2024 Southend-on-Sea City Council election
- 2026 Southend-on-Sea City Council election

== Results maps ==
=== Non-metropolitan district ===
1978 results map

1979 results map

1980 results map

1982 results map

1983 results map

1984 results map

1986 results map

1987 results map

1988 results map

1990 results map

1991 results map

1992 results map

1994 results map

1995 results map

1996 results map

=== Unitary authority ===
1997 results map

1999 results map

2000 results map

2001 results map

2002 results map

2003 results map

2004 results map

2006 results map

2007 results map

2008 results map

2010 results map

2011 results map

2012 results map

2014 results map

2015 results map

2016 results map

2018 results map

2019 results map

2021 results map

2022 results map

2023 results map

2024 results map

2026 results map

== By-election results ==
A by-election occurs when seats become vacant between council elections. Below is a summary of by-elections from 1983 onwards. Full by-election results are listed under the last regular election preceding the by-election and can be found by clicking on the ward name.

=== 1983-1994 ===
Ward	Date	Incumbent party	Winning party
Leigh	7 March 1985	Alliance	Alliance
Belfairs	4 October 1985	Alliance	Alliance
Leigh	20 February 1986	Alliance	Alliance
Blenheim	7 September 1989	SLD	Conservative
Blenheim	7 September 1989	SLD	SLD
Victoria	7 February 1991	Labour	Labour
Belfairs	26 September 1991	Liberal Democrats	Conservative
Belfairs	9 April 1992	Conservative	Conservative
Belfairs	30 September 1993	Conservative	Liberal Democrats

=== 1995-2006 ===
Ward	Date	Incumbent party	Winning party
Chalkwell	19 February 1998	Liberal Democrats	Conservative
Shoeburyness	19 July 2001	Labour	Conservative
West Shoebury	7 December 2006	Conservative	Conservative

=== 2007-2018 ===
Ward	Date	Incumbent party	Winning party
Shoeburyness	20 September 2007	Conservative	Independent
West Leigh	23 January 2014	Conservative	Conservative
Shoeburyness	25 May 2017	Independent	Independent
Milton	21 March 2019	Labour	Labour

=== 2019-present ===
Ward	Date	Incumbent party	Winning party
Southchurch	3 March 2022	Conservative	Conservative
Kursaal	4 July 2024	Labour	Labour
