= 2001 Southend-on-Sea Borough Council election =

2001 UK local government election

- 7 June 2001

All 51 seats to Southend-on-Sea Borough Council 26 seats needed for a majority

	First party	Second party	Third party
Party	Conservative	Labour	Liberal Democrats
Seats won	32	12	7
Seat change	▲7	▲7	▼2
Popular vote	84,705	50,487	43,367
Percentage	46.9%	27.9%	24.0%
Swing	▼10.5%	▲10.4%	▲1.0%
- Winner of each seat at the 2001 Southend-on-Sea Borough Council election.
Council control before election
Conservative
Council control after election
Conservative

The 2001 Southend-on-Sea Borough Council election took place on 7 June 2001 to elect members of Southend-on-Sea Borough Council in Essex, England. This was on the same day as the 2001 general election and other local elections.

The whole council was up for election with boundary changes since the last election in 2000 increasing the number of seats by 12 to 51. The Conservative Party stayed in overall control of the council.

== Summary ==
=== Election result ===
The results saw the Conservative increase their majority on the council after winning 32 of the 51 seats on the council. The Labour Party won 12 seats to become the main opposition, while the Liberal Democrats dropped to 7 seats.

2001 Southend-on-Sea Borough Council election
Party	Candidates	Seats	Gains	Losses	Net gain/loss	Seats %	Votes %	Votes	+/−
Conservative	51	32	2	3	▲7	62.7	46.9	84,705	–10.5
Labour	51	12	4	1	▲7	23.5	27.9	50,487	+10.4
Liberal Democrats	43	7	1	3	▼2	13.7	24.0	43,367	+1.0
Independent	2	0	0	0	Steady	0.0	0.7	1,288	N/A
Green	2	0	0	0	Steady	0.0	0.5	906	+0.3

== Ward results ==
=== Belfairs ===
Belfairs (3)
Party	Candidate	Votes	%	±%
Conservative	Stephen Aylen*	2,061	51.1	–18.0
Conservative	Julie Cushion	1,856	46.0	–23.1
Conservative	Margaret Evans	1,800	44.6	–24.5
Liberal Democrats	Christopher Charles	1,515	37.5	+16.4
Liberal Democrats	Michael Grimwade	1,510	37.4	+16.3
Liberal Democrats	Howard Gibeon	1,321	32.7	+11.6
Labour	Alan Francis	709	17.6	+7.8
Labour	Cheryl Nevin	679	16.8	+7.0
Labour	Jonathan Grindley	657	16.3	+6.5
Turnout		~4,581	63.0	+25.6
Registered electors		7,272		
Conservative hold				
Conservative hold				
Conservative hold				

=== Blenheim Park ===
Blenheim Park (3)
Party	Candidate	Votes	%	±%
Liberal Democrats	Graham Longley	1,657	42.0	
Liberal Democrats	James Clinkscales	1,613	40.9	
Liberal Democrats	Brian Smith	1,559	39.5	
Conservative	David Angus	1,514	38.4	
Conservative	Margaret Longden	1,375	34.9	
Conservative	Peter Collins	1,372	34.8	
Labour	Matthew Doody	960	24.4	
Labour	Rosemary Merton	936	23.7	
Labour	Ernest Webb	840	21.3	
Turnout		~4,239	55.7	
Registered electors		7,610		
Liberal Democrats win (new seat)				
Liberal Democrats win (new seat)				
Liberal Democrats win (new seat)				

=== Chalkwell ===
Chalkwell (3)
Party	Candidate	Votes	%	±%
Conservative	Lesley Salter*	1,950	56.4	–3.6
Conservative	Charles Latham*	1,875	54.2	–5.8
Conservative	Richard Brown*	1,830	52.9	–7.1
Liberal Democrats	Roger Fisher	1,067	30.8	+7.9
Liberal Democrats	Ronald Alexander	1,022	29.5	+6.6
Liberal Democrats	Derek Holliday	815	23.6	+0.7
Labour	Joyce Mapp	708	20.5	+10.0
Labour	Lydia Sookias	602	17.4	+6.9
Labour	Sylvia Sookias	510	14.7	+4.2
Turnout		~3,852	52.9	+24.6
Registered electors		7,282		
Conservative hold				
Conservative hold				
Conservative hold				

=== Eastwood Park ===
Eastwood Park (3)
Party	Candidate	Votes	%	±%
Conservative	Christopher Walker*	1,958	50.3	
Conservative	Roger Weaver*	1,922	49.4	
Conservative	Andrew Moring	1,766	45.4	
Liberal Democrats	Norah Goodman	1,579	40.6	
Liberal Democrats	David Wells	1,244	32.0	
Liberal Democrats	Mervyn Howell	1,126	29.0	
Labour	John Felton	724	18.6	
Labour	Michael Doogan-Turner	714	18.4	
Labour	Joan Richards	635	16.3	
Turnout		~4,384	58.8	
Registered electors		7,456		
Conservative win (new seat)				
Conservative win (new seat)				
Conservative win (new seat)				

=== Kursaal ===
Kursaal (3)
Party	Candidate	Votes	%	±%
Labour	Denis Garne	1,349	54.3	
Labour	Stephen George	1,303	52.4	
Labour	Judith McMahon	1,295	52.1	
Conservative	Graham John	958	38.5	
Conservative	Leslie Judd	860	34.6	
Conservative	Judith Smithson	838	33.7	
Liberal Democrats	Rose Day	435	17.5	
Liberal Democrats	Christine Read	421	16.9	
Turnout		~2,924	42.2	
Registered electors		6,929		
Labour win (new seat)				
Labour win (new seat)				
Labour win (new seat)				

=== Leigh ===
Leigh (3)
Party	Candidate	Votes	%	±%
Liberal Democrats	Alan Crystall*	1,685	44.5	–2.3
Liberal Democrats	Peter Wexham*	1,656	43.8	–3.0
Liberal Democrats	Nigel Baker	1,564	41.3	–5.5
Conservative	Robin Carlile	1,459	38.6	–3.3
Conservative	Joyce Lambert	1,403	37.1	–4.8
Conservative	Jeanette Rowswell	1,369	36.2	–5.7
Labour	Vera Norman	801	21.2	+15.1
Labour	Kyle Campbell	710	18.8	+12.7
Labour	Colin Campbell	702	18.6	+12.5
Turnout		~4,178	59.2	+24.0
Registered electors		7,058		
Liberal Democrats hold				
Liberal Democrats hold				
Liberal Democrats gain from Conservative				

=== Milton ===
Milton (3)
Party	Candidate	Votes	%	±%
Conservative	Raymond Davy*	1,355	47.0	–3.4
Conservative	Jonathan Garston*	1,344	46.6	–3.8
Conservative	Ann Robertson	1,310	45.4	–5.0
Labour	William Chesworth	1,285	44.5	+8.5
Labour	Lilias Felton*	1,214	42.1	+6.1
Labour	Maureen Shaw	1,192	41.3	+5.3
Liberal Democrats	Amanda Spraggs	490	17.0	+10.1
Liberal Democrats	Richard Wiggins	466	16.2	+9.3
Turnout		~3,325	47.4	+22.2
Registered electors		7,014		
Conservative hold				
Conservative hold				
Conservative gain from Labour				

=== Prittlewell ===
Prittlewell (3)
Party	Candidate	Votes	%	±%
Conservative	Ronald Price	1,702	38.4	–16.8
Conservative	Murray Foster	1,626	36.6	–18.6
Conservative	Anna Waite*	1,509	34.0	–21.2
Liberal Democrats	John Adams	1,349	30.4	–2.4
Liberal Democrats	Steven Cox	1,277	28.8	–4.0
Liberal Democrats	Barry Godwin	1,223	27.6	–5.2
Labour	Margaret Borton	1,105	24.9	+12.9
Labour	Evelyn Tarff	992	22.4	+10.4
Labour	Bernard Chalk	936	21.1	+9.1
Green	Andrea Black	408	9.2	N/A
Turnout		~4,438	58.1	+25.0
Registered electors		7,639		
Conservative gain from Liberal Democrats				
Conservative hold				
Conservative hold				

=== St Laurence ===
St Laurence (3)
Party	Candidate	Votes	%	±%
Conservative	Simon Gorham	1,576	41.6	
Conservative	Michael Dolby	1,561	41.2	
Conservative	Brian Houssart	1,492	39.3	
Liberal Democrats	Mary Betson	1,361	35.9	
Liberal Democrats	Carole Roast	1,269	33.5	
Liberal Democrats	Mary Lubel*	1,245	32.8	
Labour	John Hellyer	1,006	26.5	
Labour	Colin Assen	958	25.3	
Labour	Paul White	907	23.9	
Turnout		~4,306	57.3	
Registered electors		7,515		
Conservative win (new seat)				
Conservative win (new seat)				
Conservative win (new seat)				

=== St Lukes ===
St Lukes (3)
Party	Candidate	Votes	%	±%
Labour	Reginald Copley*	1,837	52.4	+13.5
Labour	Kevin Robinson	1,680	47.9	+9.0
Labour	Michael Royston*	1,538	43.8	+4.9
Conservative	Ellen Hodgson	1,311	37.4	–11.0
Conservative	Melvyn Day*	1,307	37.3	–11.1
Conservative	Michael Steptoe	1,263	36.0	–12.4
Liberal Democrats	Michael Clark	557	15.9	+8.1
Liberal Democrats	Marion Boulton	532	15.2	+7.4
Green	Adrian Hedges	498	14.2	+9.4
Turnout		~4,005	52.4	+33.3
Registered electors		7,643		
Labour hold				
Labour gain from Conservative				
Labour hold				

=== Shoeburyness ===
Shoeburyness (3)
Party	Candidate	Votes	%	±%
Conservative	David Ascroft*	1,877	59.3	
Conservative	Patricia Rayner	1,536	48.6	
Labour	Anne Chalk	1,485	46.9	
Conservative	Allan Cole	1,415	44.7	
Labour	George Saville	1,264	40.0	
Labour	Linda Cooke	1,148	36.3	
Liberal Democrats	Janet Porter	419	13.2	
Liberal Democrats	Granville Stride	347	11.0	
Turnout		~3,758	51.1	
Registered electors		7,354		
Conservative win (new seat)				
Conservative win (new seat)				
Labour win (new seat)				

=== Southchurch ===
Southchurch (3)
Party	Candidate	Votes	%	±%
Conservative	David Garston*	2,462	68.4	–7.2
Conservative	Ann Holland*	2,301	63.9	–11.7
Conservative	Brian Kelly*	2,203	61.2	–14.4
Labour	Gary Farrer	1,003	27.8	+11.8
Labour	Ruth Jarvis	920	25.5	+9.5
Labour	Jean Haisman	878	24.4	+8.4
Liberal Democrats	Janet Davis	564	15.7	+7.3
Liberal Democrats	Michael Woolcott	475	13.2	+4.8
Turnout		~4,067	57.4	+29.1
Registered electors		7,085		
Conservative hold				
Conservative hold				
Conservative hold				

=== Thorpe ===
Thorpe (3)
Party	Candidate	Votes	%	±%
Conservative	Sally Carr*	2,893	73.0	–3.5
Conservative	Anthony Delaney*	2,738	69.0	–7.5
Conservative	Daphne White*	2,708	68.3	–8.2
Labour	Elsie Townsend	877	22.1	+6.9
Labour	John Townsend	794	20.0	+4.8
Labour	John Townsend	698	17.6	+2.4
Liberal Democrats	Timothy Ray	606	15.3	+7.0
Liberal Democrats	Linda Smith	583	14.7	+6.4
Turnout		~4,587	63.8	+36.7
Registered electors		7,189		
Conservative win (new seat)				
Conservative win (new seat)				
Conservative win (new seat)				

=== Victoria ===
Victoria (3)
Party	Candidate	Votes	%	±%
Labour	Christopher Dandridge*	1,621	60.5	+17.2
Labour	David Norman	1,395	52.1	+8.8
Labour	Jane Norman	1,371	51.2	+7.9
Conservative	Paul Jones	1,039	38.8	–7.1
Conservative	Anthony Smithson	854	31.9	–14.0
Conservative	Ahmed Khwaja	753	28.1	–17.8
Liberal Democrats	Donna Collins	514	19.2	+8.4
Liberal Democrats	Paul Collins	489	18.3	+7.5
Turnout		~3,636	52.4	+30.6
Registered electors		6,939		
Labour hold				
Labour hold				
Labour gain from Conservative				

=== West Leigh ===
West Leigh (3)
Party	Candidate	Votes	%	±%
Conservative	John Lamb*	2,541	59.1	
Conservative	Howard Briggs*	2,455	57.1	
Conservative	Gwendoline Horrigan*	2,439	56.7	
Liberal Democrats	Jeremy Pilgrim	1,389	32.3	
Liberal Democrats	Albert Wren	1,365	31.7	
Liberal Democrats	Richard Collins	1,232	28.7	
Labour	Terence Adams	505	11.7	
Labour	Suzanne Gardner	498	11.6	
Labour	Christopher Elliott	474	11.0	
Turnout		~4,655	66.8	
Registered electors		6,969		
Conservative win (new seat)				
Conservative win (new seat)				
Conservative win (new seat)				

=== West Shoebury ===
West Shoebury (3)
Party	Candidate	Votes	%	±%
Conservative	Anthony North*	2,328	63.4	
Conservative	Derek Jarvis	2,236	60.9	
Conservative	Verina Wilson*	2,135	58.1	
Labour	John Jarvis	1,173	31.9	
Labour	John Hodgkins	1,146	31.2	
Labour	David Yallop	989	26.9	
Liberal Democrats	Colin Spraggs	550	15.0	
Liberal Democrats	Geoffrey Goldsmith	466	12.7	
Turnout		~4,219	56.9	
Registered electors		7,415		
Conservative win (new seat)				
Conservative win (new seat)				
Conservative win (new seat)				

=== Westborough ===
Westborough (3)
Party	Candidate	Votes	%	±%
Liberal Democrats	Jean Sibley*	1,164	38.2	–5.6
Labour	Marimuthu Velmurugan	990	32.5	+8.1
Labour	Teresa Merrison	928	30.5	+6.1
Labour	Charles Willis	846	27.8	+3.4
Liberal Democrats	Colin Ritchie	839	27.6	–16.2
Liberal Democrats	Stephen Newton	807	26.5	–17.3
Conservative	Mark Newman	796	26.1	–5.7
Conservative	David Nicklin	779	25.6	–6.2
Conservative	Kathleen Meager	695	22.8	–9.0
Independent	Mark Flewitt	672	22.1	N/A
Independent	Martin Terry	616	20.2	N/A
Turnout		~3,431	48.5	+24.2
Registered electors		7,080		
Liberal Democrats hold				
Labour gain from Liberal Democrats				
Labour gain from Liberal Democrats				

== By-elections ==
Shoeburyness By-Election 19 July 2001
Party	Candidate	Votes	%	±%
Conservative	Allan Cole	509	48.8	−0.8
Labour	George Saville	400	38.4	−0.9
Liberal Democrats	Barry Godwin	133	12.8	+1.7
Majority		109	10.4	
Turnout		1,042	14.0	
Conservative gain from Labour		Swing		

Preceded by 2000 Southend-on-Sea Council election	Southend-on-Sea local elections	Succeeded by 2002 Southend-on-Sea Council election
