= 1994 Southend-on-Sea Borough Council election =

1994 UK local government election

← 1992	5 May 1994	1995 →

13 out of 39 seats to Southend-on-Sea Borough Council 20 seats needed for a majority

	First party	Second party
Party	Conservative	Liberal Democrats
Seats won	4	6
Seats after	17	14
Seat change	▼5	▲4
Popular vote	17,376	19,563
Percentage	35.2%	39.6%
Swing	▼18.6%	▲12.7%
	Third party	Fourth party
Party	Labour	Ind. Conservative
Seats won	3	0
Seats after	7	1
Seat change	▲1	Steady
Popular vote	12,138	did not stand
Percentage	24.6%	did not stand
Swing	▲9.9%	N/A
- Winner of each seat at the 1994 Southend-on-Sea Borough Council election.
Council control before election
Conservative
Council control after election
No overall control

The 1994 Southend-on-Sea Council election took place on 5 May 1994 to elect members of Southend-on-Sea Borough Council in Essex, England. One third of the council was up for election.

== Summary ==
=== Election result ===
1994 Southend-on-Sea Borough Council election
Party	This election			Full council			This election		
Party	Seats	Net	Seats %	Other	Total	Total %	Votes	Votes %	+/−
Conservative	4	▼5	30.8	14	17	48.7	17,376	35.2	–18.6
Liberal Democrats	6	▲4	46.2	8	14	30.8	19,563	39.6	+12.7
Labour	3	▲1	23.1	4	7	17.9	12,138	24.6	+9.9
Ind. Conservative	0	Steady	0.0	1	1	2.6	N/A	N/A	N/A
Liberal	0	Steady	0.0	0	0	0.0	340	0.7	–0.7

== Ward results ==
=== Belfairs ===
Belfairs
Party	Candidate	Votes	%	±%
Liberal Democrats	A. Petchey	2,121	47.1	+16.4
Conservative	G. Horrigan	1,945	43.2	–19.6
Labour	J. Grindley	435	9.7	+5.0
Majority		176	3.9	N/A
Turnout		4,501	51.2	+4.6
Registered electors		8,785		
Liberal Democrats gain from Conservative		Swing	▲18.0	

=== Blenheim ===
Blenheim
Party	Candidate	Votes	%	±%
Liberal Democrats	G. Longley	2,399	57.6	+13.5
Conservative	P. Longden	1,181	28.4	–19.9
Labour	R. Merton	585	14.0	+8.1
Majority		1,218	29.2	N/A
Turnout		4,165	46.5	+4.4
Registered electors		8,962		
Liberal Democrats gain from Conservative		Swing	▲16.7	

=== Chalkwell ===
Chalkwell
Party	Candidate	Votes	%	±%
Conservative	C. Latham*	1,686	45.1	–19.0
Liberal Democrats	H. Lister-Smith	1,568	42.0	+13.6
Labour	J. Mapp	481	12.9	+5.4
Majority		118	3.1	–32.6
Turnout		3,735	40.6	+4.4
Registered electors		9,192		
Conservative hold		Swing	▼16.3	

=== Eastwood ===
Eastwood
Party	Candidate	Votes	%	±%
Liberal Democrats	N. Goodman	2,384	49.4	+15.8
Conservative	H. Briggs*	1,809	37.5	–23.4
Labour	M. Pether-Longman	551	11.4	+7.2
Liberal	T. French	83	1.7	+0.5
Majority		575	11.9	N/A
Turnout		4,827	46.4	+6.3
Registered electors		10,403		
Liberal Democrats gain from Conservative		Swing	▲19.6	

=== Leigh ===
Leigh
Party	Candidate	Votes	%	±%
Liberal Democrats	A. Crystall	2,408	57.9	+9.9
Conservative	B. Isaacs*	1,314	31.6	–13.6
Labour	P. Circus	435	10.5	+5.3
Majority		1,094	26.3	+23.5
Turnout		4,157	47.0	+0.9
Registered electors		8,839		
Liberal Democrats gain from Conservative		Swing	▲11.2	

=== Milton ===
Milton
Party	Candidate	Votes	%	±%
Labour	K. Lee	1,232	42.9	+21.3
Conservative	K. Cater*	1,102	38.4	–20.1
Liberal Democrats	W. Petchey	535	18.6	–0.1
Majority		130	4.5	N/A
Turnout		2,869	35.3	+3.6
Registered electors		8,131		
Labour gain from Conservative		Swing	▲20.7	

=== Prittlewell ===
Prittlewell
Party	Candidate	Votes	%	±%
Liberal Democrats	M. Miller	2,369	60.8	+15.3
Conservative	R. Brown	943	24.2	–19.8
Labour	D. Garne	585	15.0	+6.7
Majority		1,426	36.6	+35.1
Turnout		3,897	44.1	+7.1
Registered electors		8,831		
Liberal Democrats gain from Conservative		Swing	▲17.6	

=== Shoebury ===
Shoebury
Party	Candidate	Votes	%	±%
Conservative	D. Ascroft*	2,082	41.4	–7.6
Labour	I. Pope	1,944	38.7	+23.1
Liberal Democrats	E. Erlick	1,002	19.9	+16.3
Majority		138	2.7	–15.4
Turnout		5,028	35.4	+1.7
Registered electors		14,213		
Conservative hold		Swing	▼15.4	

=== Southchurch ===
Southchurch
Party	Candidate	Votes	%	±%
Conservative	M. Haine*	1,578	45.4	–25.0
Labour	W. McIntyre	1,104	31.8	+12.9
Liberal Democrats	A. Miller	538	15.5	+8.2
Liberal	V. Wilkinson	257	7.4	+4.0
Majority		474	13.6	–37.9
Turnout		3,477	39.1	+7.5
Registered electors		8,900		
Conservative hold		Swing	▼19.0	

=== St. Luke's ===
St. Luke's
Party	Candidate	Votes	%	±%
Labour	N. Smith	1,573	54.6	+7.1
Conservative	A. Holland	715	24.8	–17.2
Liberal Democrats	R. McMullan	591	20.5	+10.0
Majority		858	29.8	+24.3
Turnout		2,879	35.3	+3.8
Registered electors		8,162		
Labour hold		Swing	▲12.2	

=== Thorpe ===
Thorpe
Party	Candidate	Votes	%	±%
Conservative	D. White	1,788	49.5	–24.1
Liberal Democrats	M. Hooton	1,122	31.1	+17.3
Labour	C. Smith	703	19.5	+9.5
Majority		666	18.4	–41.4
Turnout		3,613	37.5	+3.2
Registered electors		9,646		
Conservative hold		Swing	▼20.7	

=== Victoria ===
Victoria
Party	Candidate	Votes	%	±%
Labour	C. Dandridge	1,866	61.3	+7.4
Conservative	R. Davy	673	22.1	–14.8
Liberal Democrats	G. Stride	507	16.6	+7.4
Majority		1,193	39.2	+22.2
Turnout		3,046	33.7	+1.0
Registered electors		9,040		
Labour hold		Swing	▲11.1	

=== Westborough ===
Westborough
Party	Candidate	Votes	%	±%
Liberal Democrats	J. Sibley	2,019	62.6	+18.8
Labour	M. Royston	644	20.0	+9.0
Conservative	J. Lambert	560	17.4	–25.3
Majority		1,375	42.6	+41.5
Turnout		3,223	38.2	+3.1
Registered electors		8,432		
Liberal Democrats hold		Swing	▲4.9	
