= 1988 Southend-on-Sea Borough Council election =

1988 English local election

← 1987	5 May 1988	1990 →

14 out of 39 seats to Southend-on-Sea Borough Council 20 seats needed for a majority

	First party	Second party	Third party
Party	SLD	Conservative	Labour
Seats won	5	8	1
Seats after	18	16	5
Seat change	▼1	▲2	▼1
Popular vote	18,633	25,899	8,363
Percentage	35.2%	49.0%	15.8%
Swing	▼7.0%	▲4.5%	▲2.7%
- Winner of each seat at the 1988 Southend-on-Sea Borough Council election.
Council control before election
No overall control
Council control after election
No overall control

The 1988 Southend-on-Sea Borough Council election took place on 5 May 1988 to elect members of Southend-on-Sea Borough Council in Essex, England. This was on the same day as other local elections.

== Summary ==
=== Election result ===
1988 Southend-on-Sea Borough Council election
Party	This election			Full council			This election		
Party	Seats	Net	Seats %	Other	Total	Total %	Votes	Votes %	+/−
SLD	5	▼1	35.7	13	18	46.2	18,633	35.2	–7.0
Conservative	8	▲2	57.1	8	16	41.0	25,899	49.0	+4.5
Labour	1	▼1	7.1	4	5	12.8	8,363	15.8	+2.7

== Ward results ==
Incumbent councillors standing for re-election are marked with an asterisk (*). Changes in seats do not take into account by-elections or defections.

=== Belfairs ===
Belfairs
Party	Candidate	Votes	%	±%
SLD	N. Hall	2,129	49.5	+0.7
SLD	S. Pawson	2,100	48.8	±0.0
Conservative	J. Rowswell	2,030	47.2	+2.0
Conservative	E. Sullivan	1,821	42.3	–2.9
Labour	K. Stone	275	6.4	+0.3
Labour	G. Farrer	246	5.7	–0.4
Turnout		~4,301	47.6	+1.3
Registered electors		9,035		
SLD hold				
SLD hold				

=== Blenheim ===
Blenheim
Party	Candidate	Votes	%	±%
Conservative	N. Clarke*	1,900	45.5	+1.5
SLD	C. Mallam	1,833	43.9	–2.1
Labour	N. Boorman	443	10.6	+0.7
Majority		67	1.6	N/A
Turnout		4,176	42.4	–3.9
Registered electors		9,849		
Conservative hold		Swing	▲1.8	

=== Chalkwell ===
Chalkwell
Party	Candidate	Votes	%	±%
Conservative	J. Tobin*	2,049	53.6	+3.8
SLD	E. Bunclark	1,463	38.2	–5.8
Labour	L. Davidson	314	8.2	+2.1
Majority		586	15.3	+9.5
Turnout		3,826	40.0	–8.1
Registered electors		11,217		
Conservative hold		Swing	▲4.8	

=== Eastwood ===
Eastwood
Party	Candidate	Votes	%	±%
Conservative	R. Weaver	2,168	51.1	+9.0
SLD	N. Goodman*	1,747	41.2	–9.2
Labour	M. Fletcher	325	7.7	+1.4
Majority		421	9.9	N/A
Turnout		4,240	37.8	–8.4
Registered electors		11,217		
Conservative gain from SLD		Swing	▲9.1	

=== Leigh ===
Leigh
Party	Candidate	Votes	%	±%
SLD	N. Redican	2,161	48.8	–1.2
Conservative	H. Stennett	1,916	43.3	+0.8
Labour	K. Lee	349	7.9	+0.4
Majority		245	5.5	–2.0
Turnout		4,426	46.5	–5.2
Registered electors		9,518		
SLD hold		Swing	▼1.0	

=== Milton ===
Milton
Party	Candidate	Votes	%	±%
Conservative	G. Baum*	1,388	52.5	+4.2
Labour	D. Garne	630	23.8	+9.1
SLD	J. Overy	624	23.6	–13.4
Majority		519	28.7	+17.3
Turnout		2,642	29.9	–9.5
Registered electors		8,836		
Conservative hold		Swing	▲3.3	

=== Prittlewell ===
Prittlewell
Party	Candidate	Votes	%	±%
SLD	P. Herbert*	1,931	51.4	–4.3
Conservative	S. Houghton	1,412	37.6	+2.3
Labour	M. Howells	416	11.1	+2.2
Majority		519	13.8	–6.6
Turnout		3,759	38.0	–8.2
Registered electors		9,892		
SLD hold		Swing	▼3.3	

=== Shoebury ===
Shoebury
Party	Candidate	Votes	%	±%
Conservative	A. North*	2,707	63.7	+11.4
Labour	H. Mapp	956	22.5	+5.2
SLD	C. Samson	587	13.8	–16.6
Majority		1,751	41.2	+19.3
Turnout		4,250	32.0	–8.8
Registered electors		13,281		
Conservative hold		Swing	▲3.1	

=== Southchurch ===
Southchurch
Party	Candidate	Votes	%	±%
Conservative	E. Lockhart*	2,117	62.4	+14.8
Labour	M. McIntyre	693	20.4	+8.5
SLD	J. Kaufman	583	17.2	–23.2
Majority		1,424	42.0	+34.8
Turnout		3,393	35.1	–11.8
Registered electors		9,667		
Conservative hold		Swing	▲3.2	

=== St Lukes ===
St Lukes
Party	Candidate	Votes	%	±%
Labour	R. Copley*	1,530	47.9	+20.3
Conservative	G. Shaw	1,033	32.3	–1.7
SLD	R. More	631	19.8	–18.7
Majority		497	15.6	N/A
Turnout		3,194	37.8	–3.3
Registered electors		8,450		
Labour hold		Swing	▲11.0	

=== Thorpe ===
Thorpe
Party	Candidate	Votes	%	±%
Conservative	S. Ayre*	2,370	65.7	+3.6
SLD	C. Sweet	746	20.7	–5.1
Labour	T. Sandall	490	13.6	+1.5
Majority		1,624	45.0	+8.7
Turnout		3,606	35.1	–7.3
Registered electors		10,274		
Conservative hold		Swing	▲4.4	

=== Victoria ===
Victoria
Party	Candidate	Votes	%	±%
Conservative	A. Hurst*	1,911	53.1	+19.1
Labour	R. Davy	1,214	33.7	–5.5
SLD	N. Baker	475	13.2	–13.6
Majority		697	19.4	N/A
Turnout		3,600	36.2	–4.5
Registered electors		9,945		
Conservative gain from Labour		Swing	▲12.3	

=== Westborough ===
Westborough
Party	Candidate	Votes	%	±%
SLD	M. Clark	1,623	51.0	+0.9
Conservative	M. Myers	1,077	33.8	–3.7
Labour	A. Howe	482	15.1	+2.7
Majority		546	17.2	+4.7
Turnout		3,182	34.3	–12.2
Registered electors		9,277		
SLD hold		Swing	▲2.3	
