= 1986 Southend-on-Sea Borough Council election =

1986 English local election

← 1984	8 May 1986	1987 →

13 out of 39 seats to Southend-on-Sea Borough Council 20 seats needed for a majority

	First party	Second party	Third party
Party	Conservative	Alliance	Labour
Seats won	4	7	2
Seats after	20	15	4
Seat change	▼5	▲4	▲1
Popular vote	18,884	18,795	8,996
Percentage	40.5%	40.3%	19.3%
Swing	▼2.5%	▲7.5%	▼4.7%
- Winner of each seat at the 1986 Southend-on-Sea Borough Council election.
Council control before election
Conservative
Council control after election
Conservative

The 1986 Southend-on-Sea Borough Council election took place on 8 May 1986 to elect members of Southend-on-Sea Borough Council in Essex, England. This was on the same day as other local elections.

== Summary ==
=== Election result ===
1986 Southend-on-Sea Borough Council election
Party	This election			Full council			This election		
Party	Seats	Net	Seats %	Other	Total	Total %	Votes	Votes %	+/−
Conservative	4	▼5	30.8	16	20	51.3	18,884	40.5	–2.5
Alliance	7	▲4	53.8	8	15	38.5	18,795	40.3	+7.5
Labour	2	▲1	15.4	2	4	10.3	8,996	19.3	–4.7

== Ward results ==
Incumbent councillors standing for re-election are marked with an asterisk (*). Changes in seats do not take into account by-elections or defections.

=== Belfairs ===
Belfairs
Party	Candidate	Votes	%	±%
Alliance	V. Topham	2,257	53.9	+1.9
Conservative	R. Edwards	1,629	38.9	–2.3
Labour	L. Davidson	303	7.2	+0.4
Majority		628	15.0	+4.2
Turnout		4,189	43.6	–2.5
Registered electors		9,622		
Alliance gain from Conservative		Swing	▲2.1	

=== Blenheim ===
Blenheim
Party	Candidate	Votes	%	±%
Alliance	G. Cronkshaw	1,972	46.8	+12.9
Conservative	T. Birdseye	1,587	37.7	–7.6
Labour	N. Boorman	656	15.6	–5.2
Majority		385	9.1	N/A
Turnout		4,215	42.6	+7.2
Registered electors		9,892		
Alliance gain from Conservative		Swing	▲10.3	

=== Chalkwell ===
Chalkwell
Party	Candidate	Votes	%	±%
Alliance	J. Wade	1,916	47.1	+4.3
Conservative	M. Myers	1,834	45.1	–4.3
Labour	A. Rothwell	314	7.7	–0.1
Majority		82	2.0	N/A
Turnout		4,064	42.2	+6.2
Registered electors		9,647		
Alliance gain from Conservative		Swing	▲4.3	

=== Eastwood ===
Eastwood
Party	Candidate	Votes	%	±%
Alliance	D. Elf	1,829	47.8	–1.9
Conservative	C. Terson	1,585	41.4	+0.5
Labour	P. Harrison	415	10.8	+1.5
Majority		244	6.4	–2.4
Turnout		3,829	34.6	–1.6
Registered electors		11,065		
Alliance gain from Conservative		Swing	▼1.2	

=== Leigh ===
Leigh
Party	Candidate	Votes	%	±%
Alliance	C. Bailey	1,982	50.9	–2.1
Conservative	J. Gibbs	1,563	40.2	+0.2
Labour	K. Lee	347	8.9	+1.9
Majority		419	10.8	–2.2
Turnout		3,892	41.5	–2.0
Registered electors		9,394		
Alliance hold		Swing	▼1.2	

=== Milton ===
Milton
Party	Candidate	Votes	%	±%
Conservative	K. Cater*	1,197	43.2	–12.9
Alliance	J. Overy	996	36.0	N/A
Labour	D. Waring	577	20.8	–23.1
Majority		201	7.3	–4.9
Turnout		2,770	33.7	+7.8
Registered electors		8,226		
Conservative hold				

=== Prittlewell ===
Prittlewell
Party	Candidate	Votes	%	±%
Alliance	J. Hugill*	2,229	58.3	+5.5
Conservative	S. Houghton	1,082	28.3	–5.6
Labour	J. Cole	511	13.4	+0.1
Majority		1,147	30.0	+11.1
Turnout		3,822	38.8	+1.0
Registered electors		9,876		
Alliance hold		Swing	▲5.6	

=== Shoebury ===
Shoebury
Party	Candidate	Votes	%	±%
Conservative	D. Ascroft*	2,214	51.2	+3.0
Labour	M. Howells	1,435	33.2	–6.5
Alliance	J. Ruhier	677	15.6	+3.5
Majority		779	18.0	+9.4
Turnout		4,326	34.6	+0.1
Registered electors		12,500		
Conservative hold		Swing	▲4.8	

=== Southchurch ===
Southchurch
Party	Candidate	Votes	%	±%
Conservative	M. Haine	1,661	47.2	–14.8
Alliance	R. Hendry	1,228	34.9	+18.8
Labour	A. McAnulty	632	17.9	–3.9
Majority		433	12.3	–27.9
Turnout		3,521	36.0	+6.3
Registered electors		9,820		
Conservative hold		Swing	▼16.8	

=== St Lukes ===
St Lukes
Party	Candidate	Votes	%	±%
Labour	N. Smith	1,271	50.2	+0.9
Conservative	C. Malyon	777	30.7	–5.1
Alliance	S. Gibeon	483	19.1	+4.1
Majority		494	19.5	+6.0
Turnout		2,531	30.9	+0.8
Registered electors		8,338		
Labour gain from Conservative		Swing	▲3.0	

=== Thorpe ===
Thorpe
Party	Candidate	Votes	%	±%
Conservative	N. Moss*	1,954	60.8	–9.3
Alliance	V. Cooper	747	23.2	+9.0
Labour	T. Sandall	515	16.0	+0.3
Majority		1,207	37.5	–16.9
Turnout		3,216	31.3	+5.1
Registered electors		10,276		
Conservative hold		Swing	▼9.2	

=== Victoria ===
Victoria
Party	Candidate	Votes	%	±%
Labour	A. Dunn*	1,786	52.3	+1.8
Conservative	S. Carr	902	26.4	–2.8
Alliance	D. Turner	730	21.4	+3.8
Majority		884	25.9	N/A
Turnout		3,418	33.5	–4.4
Registered electors		9,801		
Labour hold		Swing	▲2.3	

=== Westborough ===
Westborough
Party	Candidate	Votes	%	±%
Alliance	J. Palmer*	1,749	53.7	+4.0
Conservative	J. Rowswell	899	27.6	–5.9
Labour	A. Smith	608	18.7	+2.0
Majority		850	26.1	+9.9
Turnout		3,256	36.4	–2.2
Registered electors		8,973		
Alliance hold		Swing	▲5.0	
