= 2011 Southend-on-Sea Borough Council election =

2011 UK local government election

← 2010	5 May 2011	2012 →

17 out of 51 seats to Southend-on-Sea Borough Council 26 seats needed for a majority

	First party	Second party
Party	Conservative	Liberal Democrats
Seats won	9	2
Seats after	28	10
Seat change	Steady	▼2
Popular vote	17,596	8,203
Percentage	35.9%	16.7%
Swing	▼0.7%	▼9.0%
	Third party	Fourth party
Party	Independent	Labour
Seats won	4	2
Seats after	9	4
Seat change	▲2	Steady
Popular vote	8,681	9,887
Percentage	17.7%	20.2%
Swing	▲5.5%	▲5.2%
- Winner of each seat at the 2011 Southend-on-Sea Borough Council election.
Council control before election
Conservative
Council control after election
Conservative

The 2011 Southend-on-Sea Council election took place on 5 May 2011 to elect members of Southend-on-Sea Borough Council in Essex, England. One third of the council was up for election.

== Summary ==
=== Election result ===
2011 Southend-on-Sea Borough Council election
Party	This election			Full council			This election		
Party	Seats	Net	Seats %	Other	Total	Total %	Votes	Votes %	+/−
Conservative	9	Steady	52.9	19	28	54.9	17,596	35.9	–0.7
Liberal Democrats	2	▼2	11.8	8	10	19.6	8,203	16.7	–9.0
Independent	4	▲2	23.5	5	9	17.6	8,681	17.7	+5.5
Labour	2	Steady	11.8	2	4	7.8	9,887	20.2	+5.2
UKIP	0	Steady	0.0	0	0	0.0	3,208	6.5	+2.3
Green	0	Steady	0.0	0	0	0.0	1,118	2.3	+1.1
BNP	0	Steady	0.0	0	0	0.0	238	0.5	–4.6
National Front	0	Steady	0.0	0	0	0.0	122	0.2	N/A

== Ward results ==
=== Belfairs ===
Belfairs
Party	Candidate	Votes	%	±%
Conservative	Lesley Salter*	1,624	51.7	+12.3
Liberal Democrats	Robert Cadman	600	19.1	–10.1
Labour	Matthew Zarb-Cousin	506	16.1	+5.8
UKIP	James Mills	409	13.0	N/A
Majority		1,024	32.6	+22.4
Turnout		3,139	42.8	–25.7
Registered electors		7,414		
Conservative hold		Swing	▲11.2	

=== Blenheim Park ===
Blenheim Park
Party	Candidate	Votes	%	±%
Conservative	James Courtenay	1,017	34.2	±0.0
Liberal Democrats	James Clinkscales*	959	32.3	–7.6
Labour	Tony Borton	553	18.6	+6.1
UKIP	Tino Callaghan	442	14.9	+6.9
Majority		58	2.0	N/A
Turnout		2,971	38.4	–24.4
Registered electors		7,796		
Conservative gain from Liberal Democrats		Swing	▲3.8	

=== Chalkwell ===
Chalkwell
Party	Candidate	Votes	%	±%
Conservative	Stephen Habermel*	1,256	47.3	+4.3
Independent	Lucy Courtenay	634	23.9	+11.3
Labour	Lars Davidsson	481	18.1	+6.2
Liberal Democrats	Mark Maguire	285	10.7	–11.8
Majority		622	23.4	+2.9
Turnout		2,656	36.9	–26.1
Registered electors		7,275		
Conservative hold		Swing	▼3.5	

=== Eastwood Park ===
Eastwood Park
Party	Candidate	Votes	%	±%
Conservative	Trevor Byford	1,554	52.3	+6.0
Liberal Democrats	Linda Wells	542	18.3	–10.1
Labour	Liam Overy	498	16.8	+6.2
UKIP	Keith McLaren	375	12.6	+5.6
Majority		1,012	34.1	+16.3
Turnout		2.969	39.4	–26.6
Registered electors		7,572		
Conservative hold		Swing	▲8.1	

=== Kursaal ===
Kursaal
Party	Candidate	Votes	%	±%
Labour	Judith McMahon	969	44.5	+15.4
Conservative	Neil Austin	681	31.3	+1.5
UKIP	Lawrence Davis	182	8.4	+3.5
Liberal Democrats	Richard Betson	174	8.0	–9.1
Independent	Joseph Saunders	172	7.9	N/A
Majority		288	13.2	N/A
Turnout		2,178	29.5	–17.4
Registered electors		7,443		
Labour hold		Swing	▼7.0	

=== Leigh ===
Leigh
Party	Candidate	Votes	%	±%
Liberal Democrats	Peter Wexham*	1,230	43.8	–2.3
Conservative	Georgina Phillips	936	33.3	–4.8
Labour	Iain Blake-Lawson	497	17.7	+5.5
UKIP	Luckmore Siyafa	148	5.3	N/A
Majority		294	10.5	+2.5
Turnout		2,811	38.7	–28.8
Registered electors		7,345		
Liberal Democrats hold		Swing	▲1.3	

=== Milton ===
Milton
Party	Candidate	Votes	%	±%
Conservative	Jonathan Garston*	998	40.5	+2.3
Labour	Julian Ware-Lane	800	32.5	+9.5
Independent	Christine Hills	446	18.1	N/A
Liberal Democrats	Mark Cohen	221	9.0	–13.9
Majority		198	8.0	–7.2
Turnout		2,465	33.8	–17.7
Registered electors		7,371		
Conservative hold		Swing	▼3.6	

=== Prittlewell ===
Prittlewell
Party	Candidate	Votes	%	±%
Liberal Democrats	Richard Morgan*	1,161	37.9	–2.3
Conservative	Melvyn Day	941	30.7	–1.6
Labour	Helen Symons	494	16.1	+5.6
UKIP	Garry Cockrill	467	15.2	+4.9
Majority		220	7.2	–0.7
Turnout		3,063	40.3	–23.0
Registered electors		7,649		
Liberal Democrats hold		Swing	▼0.2	

=== St. Laurence ===
St. Laurence
Party	Candidate	Votes	%	±%
Conservative	Adam Jones	976	35.3	–1.1
Liberal Democrats	Carole Roast*	878	31.7	–9.5
Labour	Reginald Copley	500	18.1	+4.3
UKIP	Robert Smith	279	10.1	N/A
Green	Daniel Lee	134	4.8	N/A
Majority		98	3.5	N/A
Turnout		2,767	37.1	–24.7
Registered electors		7,520		
Conservative gain from Liberal Democrats		Swing	▲4.2	

=== St. Luke's ===
St. Luke's
Party	Candidate	Votes	%	±%
Independent	Paul van Looy	1,225	41.7	+16.7
Labour	Anne Jones	624	21.2	–1.4
Conservative	Anna Waite*	574	19.5	–6.2
Independent	Anthony Chytry	212	7.2	N/A
BNP	Alisdair Lewis	128	4.4	–2.0
Green	Cristian Ramis	91	3.1	+0.7
Liberal Democrats	Paul Case	83	2.8	–10.1
Majority		601	20.5	N/A
Turnout		2,937	36.4	–21.0
Registered electors		8,121		
Independent gain from Conservative		Swing	▲9.1	

=== Shoeburyness ===
Shoeburyness
Party	Candidate	Votes	%	±%
Independent	Anne Chalk	1,326	48.7	+24.2
Conservative	Verina Weaver	960	35.2	–3.3
Labour	Christopher Gasper	328	12.0	–0.5
Green	Louise Dempsey	110	4.0	+2.4
Majority		366	13.4	N/A
Turnout		2,724	34.3	–23.6
Registered electors		7,985		
Independent gain from Conservative		Swing	▲13.8	

=== Southchurch ===
Southchurch
Party	Candidate	Votes	%	±%
Conservative	Ann Holland*	1,125	48.7	+0.4
Independent	Michael Wilson	1,096	37.1	+13.5
Labour	Ian Pope	387	13.1	+0.1
Green	Julian Esposito	134	4.5	N/A
BNP	Geoffrey Strobridge	110	3.7	–2.5
Liberal Democrats	David Betson	105	3.6	–9.8
Majority		29	1.0	–12.9
Turnout		2,957	39.8	–24.3
Registered electors		7,463		
Conservative hold		Swing	▼6.6	

=== Thorpe ===
Thorpe
Party	Candidate	Votes	%	±%
Independent	Ronald Woodley*	2,735	73.5	+31.2
Conservative	Peter Melville	677	18.2	–14.3
Labour	David Carrington	677	18.2	–5.2
Liberal Democrats	Colin Davis	115	3.1	–4.1
Majority		2,058	55.3	+45.4
Turnout		3,719	50.2	–20.2
Registered electors		7,431		
Independent hold		Swing	▲22.8	

=== Victoria ===
Victoria
Party	Candidate	Votes	%	±%
Labour	David Norman*	1,054	48.7	+13.3
Conservative	Raymond Davy	578	26.7	–1.3
Green	Ian Hurd	214	9.9	+4.6
Liberal Democrats	Ronella Streeter	196	9.1	–13.1
National Front	Bernadette Jaggers	122	5.6	N/A
Majority		476	22.0	+14.6
Turnout		2,164	29.8	–19.7
Registered electors		7,335		
Labour hold		Swing	▲7.3	

=== West Leigh ===
West Leigh
Party	Candidate	Votes	%	±%
Conservative	Gwendoline Horrigan*	1,769	50.0	+3.4
Liberal Democrats	Christopher Bailey	1,157	32.7	–5.1
Labour	Jane Norman	400	11.3	+4.4
UKIP	Leonard Lierens	214	6.0	N/A
Majority		612	17.3	+8.5
Turnout		3,540	50.2	–26.5
Registered electors		7,109		
Conservative hold		Swing	▲4.3	

=== West Shoebury ===
West Shoebury
Party	Candidate	Votes	%	±%
Conservative	Derek Jarvis*	1,517	51.7	+5.4
UKIP	James Moyies	692	23.6	+16.9
Labour	Stacey Phillips	496	16.9	+4.0
Liberal Democrats	Charles Row	232	7.9	–5.6
Majority		825	28.1	–2.4
Turnout		2,937	40.1	–22.3
Registered electors		7,406		
Conservative hold		Swing	▼5.8	

=== Westborough ===
Westborough
Party	Candidate	Votes	%	±%
Independent	Martin Terry*	835	35.5	+14.3
Labour	Kevin Robinson	623	26.5	+7.0
Conservative	Roger Weaver	415	17.6	–5.8
Liberal Democrats	Robert Howes	265	11.3	–12.5
Green	Douglas Rouxel	217	9.2	+6.2
Majority		202	9.0	N/A
Turnout		2,355	31.6	–24.8
Registered electors		7,566		
Independent hold		Swing	▲3.7	
