= 1991 Southend-on-Sea Borough Council election =

1991 UK local government election

- 2 May 1991

13 out of 39 seats to Southend-on-Sea Borough Council 20 seats needed for a majority

	First party	Second party
Party	Conservative	Liberal Democrats
Seats won	6	4
Seats after	24	9
Seat change	▲1	▼3
Popular vote	20,421	15,640
Percentage	39.2%	30.0%
Swing	▼5.4%	▲5.7%
	Third party	Fourth party
Party	Labour	Ind. Conservative
Seats won	2	1
Seats after	5	1
Seat change	▲1	▲1
Popular vote	9,926	2,386
Percentage	19.1%	4.6%
Swing	▼9.0%	N/A
- Winner of each seat at the 1991 Southend-on-Sea Borough Council election.
Council control before election
Conservative
Council control after election
Conservative

The 1991 Southend-on-Sea Council election took place on 2 May 1991 to elect members of Southend-on-Sea Borough Council in Essex, England. One third of the council was up for election.

== Summary ==
=== Election result ===
1991 Southend-on-Sea Borough Council election
Party	This election				Full council			This election		
Party	Candidates	Seats	Net	Seats %	Other	Total	Total %	Votes	Votes %	+/−
Conservative	{{{candidates}}}	6	▲1	46.2	18	24	61.5	20,421	39.2	–5.4
Liberal Democrats	{{{candidates}}}	4	▼3	30.8	5	9	23.1	15,640	30.0	+5.7
Labour	{{{candidates}}}	2	▲1	15.4	3	5	12.8	9,926	19.1	–9.0
Ind. Conservative	{{{candidates}}}	1	▲1	7.7	0	1	2.6	2,386	4.6	N/A
Liberal	{{{candidates}}}	0	Steady	0.0	0	0	0.0	1,297	2.5	+1.5
Independent	{{{candidates}}}	0	Steady	0.0	0	0	0.0	1,270	2.4	+2.0
Residents	{{{candidates}}}	0	Steady	0.0	0	0	0.0	1,141	2.2	N/A

== Ward results ==
=== Belfairs ===
Belfairs
Party	Candidate	Votes	%	±%
Conservative	R. Du Bois	2,141	46.3	–1.7
Liberal Democrats	D. Evans	2,103	45.5	+8.0
Labour	N. Boorman	312	6.7	–7.8
Liberal	A. Farmer	67	1.4	N/A
Majority		38	0.8	–9.7
Turnout		4,623	52.2	–1.6
Registered electors		8,863		
Conservative gain from Liberal Democrats		Swing	▼4.9	

=== Blenheim ===
Blenheim
Party	Candidate	Votes	%	±%
Liberal Democrats	C. Mallam	1,823	40.7	+6.9
Conservative	G. Littler*	1,759	39.3	–0.6
Labour	B. Thurston	447	10.0	–10.0
Independent	V. Jobson	235	5.3	N/A
Liberal	V. Wilkinson	212	4.7	–1.5
Majority		64	1.4	N/A
Turnout		4,476	48.5	–1.9
Registered electors		9,239		
Liberal Democrats hold		Swing	▲3.8	

=== Chalkwell ===
Chalkwell
Party	Candidate	Votes	%	±%
Conservative	T. Holdcroft	2,051	54.4	+4.4
Liberal Democrats	J. Wade	1,228	32.6	–2.1
Labour	J. Mapp	399	10.6	–1.4
Liberal	G. Wilkinson	94	2.5	–0.8
Majority		823	21.8	+6.4
Turnout		3,772	41.3	–8.7
Registered electors		9,148		
Conservative hold		Swing	▲3.3	

=== Eastwood ===
Eastwood
Party	Candidate	Votes	%	±%
Conservative	T. Ager	2,526	52.2	+2.4
Liberal Democrats	G. Longley*	1,878	38.8	+0.8
Labour	Z. Chaudhri	340	7.0	–5.1
Liberal	L. Farmer	98	2.0	N/A
Majority		648	13.4	+1.6
Turnout		4,842	45.7	–4.2
Registered electors		10,597		
Conservative gain from Liberal Democrats		Swing	▲0.8	

=== Leigh ===
Leigh
Party	Candidate	Votes	%	±%
Liberal Democrats	P. Wexham	2,269	49.3	+9.4
Conservative	M. Reynolds	1,880	40.9	–6.2
Labour	P. Circus	329	7.2	–5.8
Liberal	K. Izard	120	2.6	N/A
Majority		389	8.4	N/A
Turnout		4,598	51.5	–4.2
Registered electors		8,952		
Liberal Democrats hold		Swing	▲7.8	

=== Milton ===
Milton
Party	Candidate	Votes	%	±%
Conservative	J. Carlile*	1,403	50.3	+6.9
Labour	K. Lee	826	29.6	–2.1
Liberal Democrats	J. Kaufman	244	8.7	–10.9
Independent	J. Adams	166	6.0	N/A
Liberal	T. Marshall	150	5.4	+1.9
Majority		577	20.7	+9.0
Turnout		2,789	37.3	–8.3
Registered electors		7,481		
Conservative hold		Swing	▲4.5	

=== Prittlewell ===
Prittlewell
Party	Candidate	Votes	%	±%
Liberal Democrats	J. Armitage*	1,916	46.8	+13.0
Conservative	S. Diggins	1,616	39.5	+3.1
Labour	D. Garne	563	13.7	–11.2
Majority		300	7.3	N/A
Turnout		4,095	43.2	–3.8
Registered electors		9,496		
Liberal Democrats hold		Swing	▲5.0	

=== Shoebury ===
Shoebury
Party	Candidate	Votes	%	±%
Ind. Conservative	A. Cole*	2,386	44.8	N/A
Labour	A. Chalk	1,279	24.0	–23.2
Residents	R. Hadley	1,141	21.4	N/A
Independent	J. Hendry	201	3.8	N/A
Liberal Democrats	G. Stride	183	3.4	N/A
Liberal	M. Blain	134	2.5	N/A
Majority		1,107	20.8	N/A
Turnout		5,324	40.4	–5.4
Registered electors		13,183		
Ind. Conservative gain from Conservative				

=== Southchurch ===
Southchurch
Party	Candidate	Votes	%	±%
Conservative	D. Garston*	2,034	54.1	+2.0
Labour	W. McIntyre	977	26.0	–11.8
Liberal Democrats	R. More	410	10.9	+0.8
Independent	J. Foster	221	5.9	N/A
Liberal	I. Farmer	120	3.2	N/A
Majority		1,057	28.1	+13.8
Turnout		3,762	41.7	–9.0
Registered electors		9,017		
Conservative hold		Swing	▲6.9	

=== St. Luke's ===
St. Luke's
Party	Candidate	Votes	%	±%
Labour	S. Burstin	1,536	44.2	–6.0
Liberal Democrats	H. Gibeon*	1,022	29.4	N/A
Conservative	G. Woolf	845	24.3	–3.0
Liberal	T. French	75	2.2	N/A
Majority		514	14.8	–8.1
Turnout		3,478	43.7	–2.3
Registered electors		7,976		
Labour gain from Liberal Democrats				

=== Thorpe ===
Thorpe
Party	Candidate	Votes	%	±%
Conservative	S. Carr	2,356	61.4	–3.8
Labour	G. Farrer	593	15.5	–7.0
Liberal Democrats	W. Petchey	384	10.0	–0.5
Independent	D. Markscheffel	278	7.2	N/A
Liberal	S. Marshall	227	5.9	N/A
Majority		1,763	45.9	+3.2
Turnout		3,838	39.4	–8.1
Registered electors		9,758		
Conservative hold		Swing	▲1.6	

=== Victoria ===
Victoria
Party	Candidate	Votes	%	±%
Labour	J. Dunn*	1,809	54.6	–6.5
Conservative	O. Byrne	1,032	31.1	+2.2
Liberal Democrats	A. Miller	304	9.2	–0.8
Independent	C. Rogers	169	5.1	N/A
Majority		777	23.5	–8.8
Turnout		3,314	37.1	–6.3
Registered electors		8,944		
Labour hold		Swing	▲4.4	

=== Westborough ===
Westborough
Party	Candidate	Votes	%	±%
Liberal Democrats	G. Cossey*	1,876	59.2	+11.3
Conservative	R. Brown	778	24.6	+0.2
Labour	K. Stone	513	16.2	–11.5
Majority		1,098	34.6	+14.4
Turnout		3,167	37.2	–6.0
Registered electors		8,524		
Liberal Democrats hold		Swing	▲5.6	

== By-elections ==
=== Belfairs (September 1991) ===
Belfairs by-election: 26 September 1991
Party	Candidate	Votes	%	±%
Conservative		1,876	50.8	
Liberal Democrats		1,459	39.5	
Labour		213	5.8	
Independent		146	4.0	
Majority		417	11.3	
Turnout		3,694	41.7	
Registered electors		8,859		
Conservative gain from Liberal Democrats		Swing		

=== Belfairs (April 1992) ===
Belfairs by-election: 9 April 1992
Party	Candidate	Votes	%	±%
Conservative		4,104	59.1	
Liberal Democrats		2,156	31.0	
Labour		692	10.0	
Majority		1,948	28.1	
Turnout		6,952	77.2	
Registered electors		9,005		
Conservative hold		Swing		
