= 1995 Southend-on-Sea Borough Council election =

British 1995 Election

← 1994	4 May 1995	1996 →

14 out of 39 seats to Southend-on-Sea Borough Council 20 seats needed for a majority

	First party	Second party
Party	Liberal Democrats	Conservative
Seats won	7	3
Seats after	17	13
Seat change	▲2	▼3
Popular vote	16,273	15,524
Percentage	34.0%	32.5%
Swing	▼5.6%	▼2.7%
	Third party	Fourth party
Party	Labour	Ind. Conservative
Seats won	4	0
Seats after	9	0
Seat change	▲2	▼1
Popular vote	16,004	did not stand
Percentage	33.5%	did not stand
Swing	▲8.9%	N/A
- Winner of each seat at the 1995 Southend-on-Sea Borough Council election.
Council control before election
No overall control
Council control after election
No overall control

The 1995 Southend-on-Sea Council election took place on 4 May 1995 to elect members of Southend-on-Sea Borough Council in Essex, England. One third of the council was up for election.

== Summary ==
=== Election result ===
1995 Southend-on-Sea Borough Council election
Party	This election			Full council			This election		
Party	Seats	Net	Seats %	Other	Total	Total %	Votes	Votes %	+/−
Liberal Democrats	7	▲2	50.0	10	17	35.9	16,273	34.0	–5.6
Conservative	3	▼3	21.4	10	13	38.5	15,524	32.5	–2.7
Labour	4	▲2	28.6	5	9	23.1	16,004	33.5	+8.9
Ind. Conservative	0	▼1	0.0	0	0	0.0	N/A	N/A	N/A

== Ward results ==
=== Belfairs ===
Belfairs
Party	Candidate	Votes	%	±%
Liberal Democrats	S. Newton	1,805	43.4	–3.7
Conservative	H. Briggs	1,606	38.6	–4.6
Labour	J. Grindley	748	18.0	+8.3
Majority		199	4.8	+0.9
Turnout		4,159	45.3	–5.9
Registered electors		9,199		
Liberal Democrats gain from Conservative		Swing	▲0.5	

=== Blenheim ===
Blenheim
Party	Candidate	Votes	%	±%
Liberal Democrats	C. Mallam*	1,739	49.5	–8.1
Conservative	P. Longden	1,003	28.5	+0.1
Labour	M. Cohen	774	22.0	+8.0
Majority		736	21.0	–8.2
Turnout		3,516	37.6	–8.9
Registered electors		9,378		
Liberal Democrats hold		Swing	▼4.1	

=== Chalkwell ===
Chalkwell
Party	Candidate	Votes	%	±%
Conservative	T. Holdcroft*	1,498	42.3	–2.8
Liberal Democrats	H. Lister-Smith	1,454	41.0	–1.0
Labour	J. Mapp	592	16.7	+3.8
Majority		44	1.3	–1.8
Turnout		3,544	36.7	–3.9
Registered electors		9,678		
Conservative hold		Swing	▼0.9	

=== Eastwood ===
Eastwood
Party	Candidate	Votes	%	±%
Liberal Democrats	M. Betson	1,691	40.6	–8.8
Conservative	T. Ager*	1,447	34.8	–2.7
Labour	M. Pether-Longman	1,024	24.6	+13.2
Majority		244	5.8	–6.1
Turnout		4,162	38.6	–7.8
Registered electors		10,795		
Liberal Democrats gain from Conservative		Swing	▲3.1	

=== Leigh ===
Leigh
Party	Candidate	Votes	%	±%
Liberal Democrats	P. Wexham*	2,099	56.7	–1.2
Conservative	J. Rowswell	965	26.1	–5.5
Labour	P. Circus	640	17.3	+6.8
Majority		1,134	30.6	+4.3
Turnout		3,704	39.9	–7.1
Registered electors		9,294		
Liberal Democrats hold		Swing	▲2.2	

=== Milton ===
Milton
Party	Candidate	Votes	%	±%
Labour	P. Hawkins	1,508	54.1	+11.2
Conservative	J. Carlile	1,012	36.3	–2.1
Liberal Democrats	W. Petchey	269	9.6	–9.0
Majority		496	17.8	+13.3
Turnout		2,789	31.0	–4.3
Registered electors		8,995		
Labour gain from Conservative		Swing	▲6.7	

=== Prittlewell ===
Prittlewell
Party	Candidate	Votes	%	±%
Liberal Democrats	D. Durrant	1,633	54.0	–6.8
Liberal Democrats	D. Elf	1,627	53.8	–7.0
Conservative	R. Brown	747	24.7	+0.5
Conservative	B. Houssart	721	23.8	–0.4
Labour	R. Merton	688	22.7	+7.7
Labour	Z. Chaudhri	633	20.9	+5.9
Turnout		~3,302	35.6	–8.5
Registered electors		9,274		
Liberal Democrats hold				
Liberal Democrats hold				

=== Shoebury ===
Shoebury
Party	Candidate	Votes	%	±%
Labour	R. Kennedy	2,275	45.8	+7.1
Conservative	R. Hadley	1,972	39.7	–1.7
Liberal Democrats	C. Cooper	721	14.5	–5.4
Majority		303	6.1	N/A
Turnout		4,968	33.1	–2.3
Registered electors		14,932		
Labour gain from Ind. Conservative		Swing	▲4.4	

=== Southchurch ===
Southchurch
Party	Candidate	Votes	%	±%
Conservative	D. Garston*	1,454	45.3	–0.1
Labour	D. Garne	1,293	40.3	+8.5
Liberal Democrats	A. Miller	460	14.3	–1.2
Majority		161	5.0	–8.6
Turnout		3,207	35.2	–3.9
Registered electors		9,136		
Conservative hold		Swing	▼4.3	

=== St. Luke's ===
St. Luke's
Party	Candidate	Votes	%	±%
Labour	S. Burstin*	2,045	72.3	+17.7
Conservative	A. Holland	508	18.0	–6.8
Liberal Democrats	R. Alexander	276	9.8	–10.7
Majority		1,537	54.3	+24.5
Turnout		2,829	32.9	–2.4
Registered electors		8,605		
Labour hold		Swing	▲12.3	

=== Thorpe ===
Thorpe
Party	Candidate	Votes	%	±%
Conservative	S. Carr*	1,641	51.3	+1.8
Labour	C. Smith	833	26.0	+6.5
Liberal Democrats	M. Donn	727	22.7	–8.4
Majority		808	25.3	+6.9
Turnout		3,201	32.1	–5.4
Registered electors		9,997		
Conservative hold		Swing	▼2.4	

=== Victoria ===
Victoria
Party	Candidate	Votes	%	±%
Labour	J. Dunn*	2,061	71.3	+10.0
Conservative	R. Davy	519	17.9	–4.2
Liberal Democrats	M. Francis	312	10.8	–5.8
Majority		1,542	53.4	+14.2
Turnout		2,892	30.1	–3.6
Registered electors		9,623		
Labour hold		Swing	▲7.1	

=== Westborough ===
Westborough
Party	Candidate	Votes	%	±%
Liberal Democrats	M. Lubel	1,460	52.5	–10.1
Labour	M. Royston	890	32.0	+12.0
Conservative	J. Lambert	431	15.5	–1.9
Majority		570	20.5	–22.1
Turnout		2,781	31.5	–6.7
Registered electors		8,858		
Liberal Democrats hold		Swing	▲11.1	
