= 2010 Southend-on-Sea Borough Council election =

2010 UK local government election

← 2008	6 May 2010	2011 →

17 out of 51 seats to Southend-on-Sea Borough Council 26 seats needed for a majority

	First party	Second party
Party	Conservative	Liberal Democrats
Seats won	10	5
Seats after	28	12
Seat change	▲1	▲1
Popular vote	28,859	20,257
Percentage	36.6%	25.7%
Swing	▼4.2%	▲6.5%
	Third party	Fourth party
Party	Independent	Labour
Seats won	1	1
Seats after	7	4
Seat change	Steady	▼2
Popular vote	9,595	11,815
Percentage	12.2%	15.0%
Swing	▼3.1%	▲2.7%
- Winner of each seat at the 2010 Southend-on-Sea Borough Council election.
Council control before election
Conservative
Council control after election
Conservative

The 2010 Southend-on-Sea Borough Council election took place on 6 May 2010 to elect members of Southend-on-Sea Borough Council in Essex, England. One third of the council was up for election.

== Summary ==
=== Election result ===
2010 Southend-on-Sea Borough Council election
Party	This election			Full council			This election		
Party	Seats	Net	Seats %	Other	Total	Total %	Votes	Votes %	+/−
Conservative	10	▲1	58.8	18	28	54.9	28,859	36.6	–4.2
Liberal Democrats	5	▲1	29.4	7	12	23.5	20,257	25.7	+6.5
Independent	1	Steady	5.9	6	7	13.7	9,595	12.2	–3.1
Labour	1	▼2	5.9	3	4	7.8	11,815	15.0	+2.7
BNP	0	Steady	0.0	0	0	0.0	3,986	5.1	–5.6
UKIP	0	Steady	0.0	0	0	0.0	3,297	4.2	+2.9
Green	0	Steady	0.0	0	0	0.0	979	1.2	+0.7
English Democrat	0	Steady	0.0	0	0	0.0	57	0.1	N/A

== Ward results ==
=== Belfairs ===
Belfairs
Party	Candidate	Votes	%	±%
Conservative	Fay Evans*	1,994	39.4	–4.5
Liberal Democrats	Bob Archell	1,477	29.2	+18.3
Independent	Garry Sheen	829	16.4	N/A
Labour	Teresa Merrison	520	10.3	+4.0
BNP	Elliott Munro	235	4.6	–7.1
Majority		517	10.2	–6.6
Turnout		5,055	68.5	+30.4
Registered electors		7,423		
Conservative hold		Swing	▼11.4	

=== Blenheim Park ===
Blenheim Park
Party	Candidate	Votes	%	±%
Liberal Democrats	Duncan Russell	1,949	39.9	–0.3
Conservative	Howard Briggs	1,668	34.2	–5.3
Labour	Ami Willis	609	12.5	+3.4
UKIP	Tino Callaghan	390	8.0	N/A
BNP	Beradette Jaggers	264	5.4	–5.8
Majority		281	5.8	+5.1
Turnout		4,880	62.8	+30.7
Registered electors		7,823		
Liberal Democrats hold		Swing	▲2.5	

=== Chalkwell ===
Chalkwell
Party	Candidate	Votes	%	±%
Conservative	Richard Brown*	1,997	43.0	–13.8
Liberal Democrats	Chris Mallam	1,046	22.5	+6.1
Independent	Lucy Courtenay	586	12.6	N/A
Labour	Lars Davidsson	553	11.9	–1.9
UKIP	Keith McLaren	193	4.2	–2.8
Green	Michael Woodgate	153	3.3	N/A
BNP	David Newman	118	2.5	–3.5
Majority		951	20.5	–19.9
Turnout		4,646	63.0	+30.9
Registered electors		7,428		
Conservative hold		Swing	▼10.0	

=== Eastwood Park ===
Eastwood Park
Party	Candidate	Votes	%	±%
Conservative	Andrew Moring*	2,319	46.3	–11.2
Liberal Democrats	Mark Maguire	1,422	28.4	+5.5
Labour	Charles Willis	530	10.6	+4.1
UKIP	Carol Cockrill	350	7.0	N/A
BNP	Laurence Deacon	218	4.4	–8.7
Independent	Vernon Wilkinson	170	3.4	N/A
Majority		897	17.8	–16.7
Turnout		5,009	66.0	+32.3
Registered electors		7,609		
Conservative hold		Swing	▼8.4	

=== Kursaal ===
Kursaal
Party	Candidate	Votes	%	±%
Conservative	Louise Burdett	1,067	29.8	–8.6
Labour	Judy McMahon*	1,043	29.1	–9.0
Liberal Democrats	Richard Betson	613	17.1	+6.3
Independent	Kash Trivedi	399	11.1	N/A
BNP	David Armstrong	232	6.5	–6.2
UKIP	Lawrence Davies	174	4.9	N/A
English Democrat	Adrian Key	57	1.6	N/A
Majority		24	0.7	+0.4
Turnout		3,585	46.9	+19.1
Registered electors		7,686		
Conservative gain from Labour		Swing	▲0.2	

=== Leigh ===
Leigh
Party	Candidate	Votes	%	±%
Liberal Democrats	Barry Godwin*	2,287	46.1	–7.1
Conservative	James Courtenay	1,892	38.1	+5.0
Labour	Linda Cook	605	12.2	+5.3
BNP	Raymond Weaver	182	3.7	–3.2
Majority		395	8.0	–12.1
Turnout		4,966	67.5	+34.5
Registered electors		7,382		
Liberal Democrats hold		Swing	▼6.6	

=== Milton ===
Milton
Party	Candidate	Votes	%	±%
Conservative	Maria Caunce	1,502	38.2	–9.7
Labour	Simon Morley	905	23.0	–2.9
Liberal Democrats	Bob Howes	901	22.9	+6.3
Independent	Julian Lowes	243	6.2	N/A
UKIP	Wayne Mearns	207	5.3	N/A
BNP	Stanley Adie	171	4.4	–5.2
Majority		597	15.2	–6.8
Turnout		3,929	51.5	+23.4
Registered electors		7,689		
Conservative hold		Swing	▼3.4	

=== Prittlewell ===
Prittlewell
Party	Candidate	Votes	%	±%
Liberal Democrats	Mike Grimwade*	1,947	40.2	+1.8
Conservative	Ray Davy	1,566	32.3	–3.4
Labour	Tony Borton	507	10.5	+2.5
UKIP	Garry Cockrill	499	10.3	–0.6
BNP	Craig Pace	180	3.7	–3.4
Green	Andrea Black	150	3.1	N/A
Majority		381	7.9	+5.2
Turnout		4,849	63.3	+26.7
Registered electors		7,688		
Liberal Democrats hold		Swing	▲2.6	

=== St. Laurence ===
St. Laurence
Party	Candidate	Votes	%	±%
Liberal Democrats	Ted Lewin*	1,928	41.2	+3.1
Conservative	David Garston	1,706	36.4	–6.1
Labour	David Carrington	647	13.8	+5.7
BNP	Keith Barrett	403	8.6	–2.7
Majority		222	4.7	N/A
Turnout		4,684	61.8	+28.0
Registered electors		7,605		
Liberal Democrats hold		Swing	▲4.6	

=== St. Luke's ===
St. Luke's
Party	Candidate	Votes	%	±%
Conservative	Sally Carr	1,197	25.7	–5.6
Independent	Paul van Looy	1,164	25.0	+0.4
Labour	Mike Royston*	1,051	22.6	+3.1
Liberal Democrats	Brian Ayling	601	12.9	+7.6
BNP	Fenton Bowley	300	6.4	–8.7
UKIP	Len Lierens	229	4.9	+2.1
Green	Cris Ramis	110	2.4	+0.9
Majority		33	0.7	–6.1
Turnout		4,652	57.4	+22.7
Registered electors		8,128		
Conservative gain from Labour		Swing	▼3.0	

=== Shoeburyness ===
Shoeburyness
Party	Candidate	Votes	%	±%
Conservative	Roger Hadley*	1,782	38.5	+8.6
Independent	Anne Chalk	1,132	24.5	N/A
Labour	Chris Gasper	579	12.5	+1.2
Liberal Democrats	Jane Dresner	556	12.0	+8.6
BNP	Roger Gander	265	5.7	–3.9
UKIP	Bruce Halling	242	5.2	N/A
Green	Julian Esposito	73	1.6	N/A
Majority		650	14.0	N/A
Turnout		4,629	57.9	+28.6
Registered electors		8,079		
Conservative hold				

=== Southchurch ===
Southchurch
Party	Candidate	Votes	%	±%
Conservative	Brian Kelly*	1,762	37.6	+0.5
Independent	Mike Wilson	1,108	23.6	N/A
Liberal Democrats	Margaret Lewin	630	13.4	+8.8
Labour	Denis Garne	609	13.0	+5.6
UKIP	Bob Smith	291	6.2	N/A
BNP	Geoff Strobridge	289	6.2	–4.2
Majority		654	13.9	N/A
Turnout		4,689	64.1	+26.7
Registered electors		7,362		
Conservative hold				

=== Thorpe ===
Thorpe
Party	Candidate	Votes	%	±%
Independent	Alex Kaye	2,198	42.3	N/A
Conservative	Verina Weaver	1,686	32.5	+1.3
Labour	Matt Zarb-Cousin	541	10.4	+7.2
Liberal Democrats	Colin Davis	373	7.2	+3.9
UKIP	James Mills	239	4.6	N/A
BNP	Lisa Simmonds	158	3.0	–1.5
Majority		512	9.9	N/A
Turnout		5,195	70.4	+24.3
Registered electors		7,406		
Independent gain from Conservative				

=== Victoria ===
Victoria
Party	Candidate	Votes	%	±%
Labour	Margarey Borton*	1,304	35.4	–2.4
Conservative	Ahmad Khawaja	1,032	28.0	+2.9
Liberal Democrats	Ronella Streeter	817	22.2	+11.4
BNP	Alisdair Lewis	341	9.2	–9.2
Green	Stephen Jordan	194	5.3	–2.6
Majority		272	7.4	–5.3
Turnout		3,688	49.5	+22.6
Registered electors		7,499		
Labour hold		Swing	▼2.2	

=== West Leigh ===
West Leigh
Party	Candidate	Votes	%	±%
Conservative	Nigel Holdcraft*	2,541	46.6	–11.5
Liberal Democrats	Christopher Bailey	2,060	37.8	+9.3
Labour	Darius Ware-Lane	377	6.9	+1.6
BNP	Antony Winchester	185	3.4	–4.7
Green	Barry Bolton	170	3.1	N/A
Independent	Christine Hills	123	2.3	N/A
Majority		481	8.8	–20.8
Turnout		5,456	76.7	+34.8
Registered electors		7,137		
Conservative hold		Swing	▼10.4	

=== West Shoebury ===
West Shoebury
Party	Candidate	Votes	%	±%
Conservative	Tony Cox*	2,142	46.3	–10.1
Independent	Evelyn Assenheim	730	15.8	N/A
Liberal Democrats	Mark Cohen	627	13.5	+0.1
Labour	Joyce Mapp	597	12.9	+1.5
UKIP	James Moyies	308	6.7	N/A
BNP	Russell Speller	227	4.9	–13.9
Majority		1,412	30.5	–7.1
Turnout		4,631	62.4	+29.6
Registered electors		7,447		
Conservative hold				

=== Westborough ===
Westborough
Party	Candidate	Votes	%	±%
Liberal Democrats	Paul Collins	1,023	23.8	+15.3
Conservative	Melvyn Day	1,006	23.4	–1.7
Independent	Tania Painton*	913	21.2	N/A
Labour	Kevin Robinson	838	19.5	+10.0
BNP	Lancelot Martin	218	5.1	–6.9
UKIP	Lucky Siyafa	175	4.1	N/A
Green	Rita Wood	129	3.0	N/A
Majority		17	0.4	N/A
Turnout		4,302	56.4	+27.5
Registered electors		4,302		
Liberal Democrats gain from Independent		Swing	▲8.5	
