= 2002 Southend-on-Sea Borough Council election =

2002 UK local government election

← 2001	2 May 2002	2003 →

17 out of 51 seats to Southend-on-Sea Borough Council 26 seats needed for a majority

	First party	Second party	Third party
Party	Conservative	Labour	Liberal Democrats
Seats won	11	4	2
Seats after	33	11	7
Seat change	▲1	▼1	Steady
Popular vote	16,732	7,586	7,687
Percentage	46.3%	21.0%	21.3%
Swing	▼0.6%	▼6.9%	▼2.7%
- Winner of each seat at the 2002 Southend-on-Sea Borough Council election.
Council control before election
Conservative
Council control after election
Conservative

The 2002 Southend-on-Sea Council election took place on 2 May 2002 to elect members of Southend-on-Sea Unitary Council in Essex, England. One third of the council was up for election and the Conservative party stayed in overall control of the council.

== Campaign ==
The election saw a group of seven campaigners stand as independent candidates in the election. They described themselves as "the magnificent seven" and were standing in protest against plans to widen Prioy Crescent and to move St Laurence Church in Eastwood.

== Summary ==
=== Election result ===
2002 Southend-on-Sea Borough Council election
Party	This election			Full council			This election		
Party	Seats	Net	Seats %	Other	Total	Total %	Votes	Votes %	+/−
Conservative	11	▲1	64.7	22	33	64.7	16,732	46.3	–0.6
Labour	4	▼1	23.5	7	11	21.6	7,586	21.0	–6.9
Liberal Democrats	2	Steady	11.8	5	7	13.7	7,687	21.3	–2.7
Independent	0	Steady	0.0	0	0	0.0	3,417	9.5	+8.8
Green	0	Steady	0.0	0	0	0.0	683	1.9	+1.4

== Ward results ==
=== Belfairs ===
Belfairs
Party	Candidate	Votes	%	±%
Conservative	Margaret Evans*	1,246	50.3	+2.2
Liberal Democrats	Michael Grimwade	739	29.8	–5.6
Labour	Linda Cook	274	11.1	–5.4
Independent	Michael Downer	219	8.8	N/A
Majority		507	20.5	N/A
Turnout		2,478	34.2	–28.8
Registered electors		7,262		
Conservative hold		Swing	▲3.9	

=== Blenheim Park ===
Blenheim Park
Party	Candidate	Votes	%	±%
Liberal Democrats	Brian Smith*	988	45.7	+5.6
Conservative	Peter Collins*	819	37.9	+1.3
Labour	Charles Willis	356	16.5	–6.7
Majority		169	7.8	N/A
Turnout		2,163	28.9	–26.8
Registered electors		7,515		
Liberal Democrats hold		Swing	▲2.2	

=== Chalkwell ===
Chalkwell
Party	Candidate	Votes	%	±%
Conservative	Richard Brown*	1,217	59.8	+7.5
Liberal Democrats	Ronald Alexander	379	18.6	–10.0
Labour	Lydia Sookias	280	13.8	–5.2
Independent	Donald Weedon	160	7.9	N/A
Majority		838	41.2	N/A
Turnout		2,036	27.8	−25.1
Registered electors		7,351		
Conservative hold		Swing	▲8.8	

=== Eastwood Park ===
Eastwood Park
Party	Candidate	Votes	%	±%
Conservative	Andrew Moring*	1,236	49.2	+3.2
Liberal Democrats	Nora Goodman	837	33.3	–3.8
Labour	Julian Ware-Lane	232	9.2	–7.8
Independent	Keith Richardson	206	8.2	N/A
Majority		399	15.9	N/A
Turnout		2,511	33.7	−25.1
Registered electors		7,457		
Conservative hold		Swing	▲3.5	

=== Kursaal ===
Kursaal
Party	Candidate	Votes	%	±%
Labour	Julian McMahon*	648	49.7	+0.5
Conservative	Judith Smithson	458	35.1	+0.2
Liberal Democrats	Linda Smith	199	15.2	–0.7
Majority		190	14.6	N/A
Turnout		1,305	18.9	−23.3
Registered electors		6,937		
Labour hold		Swing	▲0.2	

=== Leigh ===
Leigh
Party	Candidate	Votes	%	±%
Liberal Democrats	Nigel Baker*	1,068	45.4	+2.7
Conservative	Terence Gray	800	34.0	–3.0
Independent	Douglas Copping	268	11.4	N/A
Labour	Vera Norman	215	9.1	–11.2
Majority		268	11.4	N/A
Turnout		2,351	33.2	−26.0
Registered electors		7,104		
Liberal Democrats hold		Swing	▲2.9	

=== Milton ===
Milton
Party	Candidate	Votes	%	±%
Conservative	Ann Robertson*	1,069	54.3	+11.0
Labour	Lilias Felton*	682	34.7	–6.4
Green	William Ferrett	216	11.0	N/A
Majority		387	19.7	N/A
Turnout		1,967	27.5	−19.9
Registered electors		7,166		
Conservative hold		Swing	▲8.7	

=== Prittlewell ===
Prittlewell
Party	Candidate	Votes	%	±%
Conservative	Anna Waite*	851	33.1	–4.2
Liberal Democrats	John Adams	745	29.0	–0.6
Independent	Peter Walker	602	23.4	N/A
Labour	Margaret Borton	370	14.4	–9.8
Majority		106	4.1	N/A
Turnout		2,568	34.0	−24.1
Registered electors		7,571		
Conservative hold		Swing	▼1.8	

=== St Laurence ===
St Laurence
Party	Candidate	Votes	%	±%
Conservative	Brian Houssart*	796	31.5	–8.5
Liberal Democrats	Carole Roast	749	29.6	–4.9
Independent	Adrian Sinclair-McCall	661	26.1	N/A
Labour	Paul White	325	12.8	–4.9
Majority		47	1.9	N/A
Turnout		2,531	33.7	−33.6
Registered electors		7,530		
Conservative hold		Swing	▼1.8	

=== St Lukes ===
St Lukes
Party	Candidate	Votes	%	±%
Labour	Michael Royston*	848	50.4	+6.7
Conservative	Ellen Hodgson	627	37.3	+6.1
Green	Adrian Hedges	208	12.4	+0.6
Majority		221	13.1	N/A
Turnout		1,683	21.9	−30.5
Registered electors		7,702		
Labour hold		Swing	▲0.3	

=== Shoeburyness ===
Shoeburyness
Party	Candidate	Votes	%	±%
Conservative	Allan Cole	675	37.7	–11.9
Independent	Roger Hadley	535	29.9	N/A
Labour	Anne Chalk*	479	26.7	–13.2
Liberal Democrats	Marion Boulton	103	5.7	–5.4
Majority		140	7.8	N/A
Turnout		1,792	24.5	−26.6
Registered electors		7,333		
Conservative gain from Labour				

=== Southchurch ===
Southchurch
Party	Candidate	Votes	%	±%
Conservative	Brian Kelly*	1,290	60.7	–0.4
Labour	Joyce Mapp	354	16.7	–8.2
Independent	Susan Richardson	306	14.4	N/A
Liberal Democrats	Richard Gage	175	8.2	–5.8
Majority		936	44.0	N/A
Turnout		2,125	29.9	−27.5
Registered electors		7,114		
Conservative hold		Swing	▲3.9	

=== Thorpe ===
Thorpe
Party	Candidate	Votes	%	±%
Conservative	Daphne White*	1,765	75.5	+9.4
Labour	John Townsend	346	14.8	–5.2
Liberal Democrats	Timothy Ray	226	9.7	–4.1
Majority		1,419	60.7	N/A
Turnout		2,337	32.5	−31.3
Registered electors		7,196		
Conservative hold		Swing	▲7.3	

=== Victoria ===
Victoria
Party	Candidate	Votes	%	±%
Labour	Jane Norman*	906	57.3	+6.2
Conservative	Paul Jones	526	33.3	+0.6
Green	Andrew Vaughan	149	9.4	N/A
Majority		380	24.0	N/A
Turnout		1,581	22.7	−29.7
Registered electors		6,989		
Labour hold		Swing	▲2.8	

=== West Leigh ===
West Leigh
Party	Candidate	Votes	%	±%
Conservative	Gwendoline Horrigan*	1,692	61.2	+3.9
Liberal Democrats	Albert Wren	875	31.7	+0.4
Labour	Raoul Meade	196	7.1	–4.3
Majority		817	29.6	N/A
Turnout		2,763	40.5	−26.3
Registered electors		6,859		
Conservative hold		Swing	▲1.8	

=== West Shoebury ===
West Shoebury
Party	Candidate	Votes	%	±%
Conservative	Verina Wilson*	1,347	63.8	+6.3
Labour	George Saville	588	27.9	–1.1
Liberal Democrats	Geoffrey Goldsmith	176	8.3	–5.3
Majority		759	36.0	N/A
Turnout		2,111	28.3	–28.6
Registered electors		7,467		
Conservative hold		Swing	▲3.7	

=== Westborough ===
Westborough
Party	Candidate	Votes	%	±%
Labour	Teresa Merrison*	487	27.0	–0.3
Independent	Martin Terry	460	25.5	+6.9
Liberal Democrats	Colin Ritchie	428	23.7	–8.4
Conservative	Mark Newman	318	17.6	–4.4
Green	Rita Wood	110	6.1	N/A
Majority		27	1.5	N/A
Turnout		1,803	25.3	−23.2
Registered electors		7,142		
Labour hold		Swing	▼3.6	
