= 2006 Southend-on-Sea Borough Council election =

2006 UK local government election

- 4 May 2006

19 out of 51 seats to Southend-on-Sea Borough Council 26 seats needed for a majority

	First party	Second party
Party	Conservative	Liberal Democrats
Seats won	11	4
Seats after	30	9
Seat change	▼2	▲2
Popular vote	19,640	12,004
Percentage	42.2%	25.8%
Swing	▼7.3%	▼0.3%
	Third party	Fourth party
Party	Labour	Alliance Southend
Seats won	3	1
Seats after	8	4
Seat change	▼1	▲1
Popular vote	5,931	4,249
Percentage	12.7%	9.1%
Swing	▼3.9%	N/A
- Winner of each seat at the 2006 Southend-on-Sea Borough Council election.
Council control before election
Conservative
Council control after election
Conservative

The 2006 Southend-on-Sea Borough Council election took place on 4 May 2006 to elect members of Southend-on-Sea Borough Council in Essex, England. One third of the council was up for election and the Conservative Party stayed in overall control of the council.

== Summary ==
=== Campaign ===
The election saw a candidate from a new party, Mums' Army, stand in West Shoebury ward. The party was founded by Take a Break magazine with a platform of addressing anti-social behaviour in the community.

Meanwhile, the Labour Party was unable to put up candidates in 5 wards after their nomination papers were stolen just before they were to be handed in.

=== Election result ===
The results saw the Conservatives stay in control of the council after winning 11 of the 19 seats which were contested. However this was one down on before the election, after the Conservative council leader, Anna Waite, was defeated in Prittlewell by the Liberal Democrats. The Liberal Democrats gained 2 seats to overtake Labour as the second largest party on the council with 9 councillors, as against 8 for Labour. Overall turnout in the election was 34%.

2006 Southend-on-Sea Borough Council election
Party	This election			Full council			This election		
Party	Seats	Net	Seats %	Other	Total	Total %	Votes	Votes %	+/−
Conservative	11	▼2	57.9	19	30	58.8	19,640	42.2	–7.3
Liberal Democrats	4	▲2	21.1	5	9	17.6	12,004	25.8	–0.3
Labour	3	▼1	15.8	5	8	15.7	5,931	12.7	–3.9
Alliance Southend	1	▲1	5.3	3	4	7.8	4,249	9.1	N/A
BNP	0	Steady	0.0	0	0	0.0	2,140	4.6	N/A
Green	0	Steady	0.0	0	0	0.0	1,385	3.0	+0.2
UKIP	0	Steady	0.0	0	0	0.0	954	2.0	+0.4
Mums' Army	0	Steady	0.0	0	0	0.0	140	0.3	N/A
Independent	0	Steady	0.0	0	0	0.0	132	0.3	–2.1

== Ward results ==
=== Belfairs ===
Belfairs
Party	Candidate	Votes	%	±%
Conservative	Margaret Evans*	1,326	46.0	−8.4
Alliance Southend	Margaret Webb	879	30.5	N/A
Liberal Democrats	Ronald Streeter	679	23.5	−10.6
Majority		447	15.5	−4.8
Turnout		2,884	39.9	−2.0
Registered electors		7,299		
Conservative hold				

=== Blenheim Park ===
Blenheim Park
Party	Candidate	Votes	%	±%
Liberal Democrats	Brian Smith*	1,009	38.9	−7.4
Conservative	Duncan Newham	814	31.4	−9.1
UKIP	Seantino Callaghan	458	17.7	N/A
Labour	Julian Ware-Lane	313	12.1	−1.2
Majority		195	7.5	+1.7
Turnout		2,594	34.2	−1.7
Registered electors		7,614		
Liberal Democrats hold		Swing	▲0.9	

=== Chalkwell ===
Chalkwell
Party	Candidate	Votes	%	±%
Conservative	Richard Brown*	1,309	56.4	±0.0
Liberal Democrats	John Adams	648	27.9	+5.4
Labour	John Aitkin	365	15.7	+2.9
Majority		661	28.5	−5.5
Turnout		2,322	32.6	−2.8
Registered electors		7,244		
Conservative hold		Swing	▼2.7	

=== Eastwood Park ===
Eastwood Park
Party	Candidate	Votes	%	±%
Conservative	Andrew Moring*	1,539	59.1	+3.9
Liberal Democrats	Stephen Walton	830	31.9	−4.4
Labour	Raoul Meade	233	9.0	+0.5
Majority		709	27.2	+8.3
Turnout		2,602	35.0	−3.1
Registered electors		7,494		
Conservative hold		Swing	▲4.2	

=== Kursaal ===
Kursaal
Party	Candidate	Votes	%	±%
Labour	Judith McMahon*	650	35.3	+0.8
Conservative	Blaine Robin	522	28.4	−5.8
BNP	Dean Fenner	391	21.2	N/A
Liberal Democrats	Jennifer Wrexham	278	15.1	+3.9
Majority		128	7.0	+6.8
Turnout		1,841	27.8	+1.0
Registered electors		6,670		
Labour hold		Swing	▲3.3	

=== Leigh ===
Leigh
Party	Candidate	Votes	%	±%
Liberal Democrats	Barry Godwin	1,316	51.4	−3.0
Conservative	Stephen Ryan	872	34.0	−2.0
Green	Nicola Gilbey	374	14.6	N/A
Majority		444	17.3	−1.1
Turnout		2,562	36.4	−1.3
Registered electors		7,119		
Liberal Democrats hold		Swing	▼0.5	

=== Milton ===
Milton
Party	Candidate	Votes	%	±%
Conservative	Ann Robertson*	818	40.0	−11.2
Labour	Reginald Copley	431	21.1	−6.5
Alliance Southend	John Bacon	318	15.6	N/A
Liberal Democrats	Paul Collins	269	13.2	−8.0
Green	Stephen Jordan	208	10.2	N/A
Majority		387	18.9	−4.7
Turnout		2,044	30.0	−0.9
Registered electors		6,851		
Conservative hold		Swing	▼2.4	

=== Prittlewell ===
Prittlewell
Party	Candidate	Votes	%	±%
Liberal Democrats	Michael Grimwade	1,124	40.9	+8.4
Conservative	Anna Waite*	999	36.3	−9.5
UKIP	John Croft	496	18.0	N/A
Independent	Alan Hart	132	4.8	+4.8
Majority		125	4.5	N/A
Turnout		2,751	37.4	−0.8
Registered electors		7,408		
Liberal Democrats gain from Conservative		Swing	▲9.0	

=== St Laurence ===
St Laurence
Party	Candidate	Votes	%	±%
Liberal Democrats	George Lewin	1,385	55.8	+25.6
Conservative	Brian Houssart*	1,099	44.2	+8.6
Majority		286	11.5	N/A
Turnout		2,484	33.3	−5.4
Registered electors		7,579		
Liberal Democrats gain from Conservative		Swing	▲8.5	

=== St Lukes ===
St Lukes
Party	Candidate	Votes	%	±%
Labour	Michael Royston*	800	33.0	+2.9
Conservative	Nigel Folkard	604	24.9	−13.2
BNP	Geoffrey Strobridge	534	22.0	N/A
Liberal Democrats	Brian Ayling	291	12.0	−6.0
Green	Cristian Ramis	197	8.1	−5.7
Majority		196	8.1	N/A
Turnout		2,426	31.0	+1.2
Registered electors		7,841		
Labour hold		Swing	▲8.1	

=== Shoeburynesss ===
Shoeburyness (2)
Party	Candidate	Votes	%	±%
Conservative	Roger Hadley	1,071	45.7	–14.5
Conservative	Allan Cole*	884	37.7	–22.5
Labour	Anne Chalk	707	30.2	+3.7
Alliance Southend	Michael Assenheim	629	26.8	N/A
Labour	Charles Willis	438	18.7	–7.8
Liberal Democrats	Amanda Spraggs	232	9.9	–3.5
Liberal Democrats	Colin Spraggs	150	6.4	–7.0
Turnout		~2,343	30.9	+1.7
Registered electors		7,584		
Conservative hold				
Conservative hold				

=== Southchurch ===
Southchurch
Party	Candidate	Votes	%	±%
Conservative	Brian Kelly*	1,296	50.3	−14.5
BNP	Stuart Freeman	489	19.0	N/A
Labour	Joyce Mapp	311	12.1	−2.2
Liberal Democrats	Linda Smith	300	11.7	+0.8
Green	Stuart Salmon	178	6.9	−3.2
Majority		807	31.4	−19.1
Turnout		2,574	36.1	−0.7
Registered electors		7,159		
Conservative hold				

=== Thorpe ===
Thorpe
Party	Candidate	Votes	%	±%
Conservative	Daphne White*	1,346	42.3	−31.2
Alliance Southend	Ronald Woodley	950	29.8	N/A
Liberal Democrats	Howard Gibeon	670	21.0	+5.8
Labour	Christopher Gasper	218	6.8	−4.5
Majority		396	12.4	−45.8
Turnout		3,184	44.3	+4.1
Registered electors		7,222		
Conservative hold				

=== Victoria ===
Victoria
Party	Candidate	Votes	%	±%
Labour	Margaret Borton	719	38.5	−4.1
Conservative	Roger Kemp	456	24.4	−10.1
BNP	Fenton Bowley	366	19.6	N/A
Liberal Democrats	Ronella Streeter	328	17.5	−5.3
Majority		263	14.1	+6.0
Turnout		1,869	26.9	−0.6
Registered electors		6,991		
Labour hold		Swing	▲3.0	

=== West Leigh ===
West Leigh (2)
Party	Candidate	Votes	%	±%
Conservative	Thomas Holdcroft	1,562	50.5	–9.1
Conservative	Gwendoline Horrigan*	1,559	50.4	–9.2
Liberal Democrats	Shirley Pawson	983	31.8	+4.2
Liberal Democrats	Bryan Paddison	874	28.3	+0.7
Green	Paul Circus	428	13.8	+7.2
Alliance Southend	Colin Ritchie	344	11.1	N/A
Turnout		5,750	44.7	−3.4
Registered electors		6,919		
Conservative hold				
Conservative hold				

=== West Shoebury ===
West Shoebury
Party	Candidate	Votes	%	±%
Conservative	Tony Cox	1,175	43.8	−24.1
Alliance Southend	Verina Weaver	456	17.0	N/A
BNP	Terence Jellis	360	13.4	N/A
Labour	Joan Richards	352	13.1	−6.8
Liberal Democrats	Christopher Mallam	198	7.4	−4.9
Mums' Army	Linda Martin	140	5.2	N/A
Majority		719	26.8	−21.2
Turnout		2,681	36.6	+2.3
Registered electors		7,357		
Conservative hold				

=== Westborough ===
Westborough
Party	Candidate	Votes	%	±%
Alliance Southend	Tania Painton	673	35.5	-11.3
Liberal Democrats	Stephen Vincent	440	23.2	+2.8
Labour	Teresa Merrison*	394	20.8	+4.7
Conservative	Richard Waite	389	20.5	+3.7
Majority		233	12.3	−14.1
Turnout		1,896	27.0	−5.2
Registered electors		7,106		
Alliance Southend gain from Labour		Swing	▼7.1	

== By-elections ==
West Shoebury By-Election 7 December 2006
Party	Candidate	Votes	%	±%
Conservative	Elizabeth Day	765	56.2	+12.2
BNP	Terence Jellis	243	17.9	+4.9
Labour	Lars Davidsson	180	13.2	+13.2
Liberal Democrats	Mary Betson	173	12.7	+5.7
Majority		522	38.3	
Turnout		1,361	18.5	
Conservative hold		Swing		
