= 1987 Southend-on-Sea Borough Council election =

1987 English local election

← 1986	7 May 1987	1988 →

13 out of 39 seats to Southend-on-Sea Borough Council 20 seats needed for a majority

	First party	Second party	Third party
Party	Alliance	Conservative	Labour
Seats won	7	5	1
Seats after	19	15	5
Seat change	▲4	▼4	Steady
Popular vote	24,565	25,886	7,647
Percentage	42.2%	44.5%	13.1%
Swing	▲1.9%	▲4.0%	▼6.2%
- Winner of each seat at the 1987 Southend-on-Sea Borough Council election.
Council control before election
Conservative
Council control after election
No overall control

The 1987 Southend-on-Sea Borough Council election took place on 7 May 1987 to elect members of Southend-on-Sea Borough Council in Essex, England. This was on the same day as other local elections.

== Summary ==
=== Election result ===
1987 Southend-on-Sea Borough Council election
Party	This election			Full council			This election		
Party	Seats	Net	Seats %	Other	Total	Total %	Votes	Votes %	+/−
Alliance	7	▲4	53.8	12	19	48.7	24,565	42.2	+1.9
Conservative	5	▼4	38.5	10	15	38.5	25,886	44.5	+4.0
Labour	1	Steady	7.7	4	5	12.8	7,647	13.1	–6.2
Independent Liberal	0	Steady	0.0	0	0	0.0	64	0.1	N/A

== Ward results ==
Incumbent councillors standing for re-election are marked with an asterisk (*). Changes in seats do not take into account by-elections or defections.

=== Belfairs ===
Belfairs
Party	Candidate	Votes	%	±%
Alliance	D. Dedman	2,445	48.8	–5.1
Conservative	V. Smith*	2,264	45.2	+6.3
Labour	G. Farrer	305	6.1	–1.1
Majority		181	3.6	–11.4
Turnout		5,014	52.3	+8.7
Registered electors		9,609		
Alliance gain from Conservative		Swing	▼5.7	

=== Blenheim ===
Blenheim
Party	Candidate	Votes	%	±%
Alliance	J. Cronkshaw	2,113	46.0	–0.8
Conservative	T. Birdseye	2,021	44.0	+6.3
Labour	N. Boorman	455	9.9	–5.7
Majority		92	2.0	–7.1
Turnout		4,589	46.3	+3.7
Registered electors		9,843		
Alliance gain from Conservative		Swing	▼3.6	

=== Chalkwell ===
Chalkwell
Party	Candidate	Votes	%	±%
Conservative	J. Hendry	2,357	49.8	+4.7
Alliance	R. Mandil-Wade	2,084	44.0	–3.1
Labour	P. Harrison	290	6.1	–1.6
Majority		273	5.8	N/A
Turnout		4,731	48.1	+5.9
Registered electors		9,843		
Conservative hold		Swing	▲3.9	

=== Eastwood ===
Eastwood
Party	Candidate	Votes	%	±%
Alliance	G. Longley*	2,582	50.4	+2.6
Conservative	C. Terson	2,154	42.1	+0.7
Labour	W. McIntyre	321	6.3	–4.5
Independent Liberal	M. Penning	64	1.2	N/A
Majority		273	8.4	+2.0
Turnout		4,731	46.2	+11.6
Registered electors		11,148		
Alliance hold		Swing	▲1.0	

=== Leigh ===
Leigh
Party	Candidate	Votes	%	±%
Alliance	A. Crystall*	2,453	50.0	–0.9
Conservative	J. Gibb	2,085	42.5	+2.3
Labour	K. Lee	366	7.5	–1.4
Majority		368	7.5	–3.3
Turnout		4,904	51.7	+10.2
Registered electors		9,485		
Alliance hold		Swing	▼1.6	

=== Milton ===
Milton
Party	Candidate	Votes	%	±%
Conservative	J. Carlile*	1,628	48.3	+5.1
Alliance	A. Pearson-Clarke	1,245	37.0	+1.0
Labour	D. Garne	496	14.7	–6.1
Majority		383	11.4	+4.1
Turnout		3,369	39.4	+5.7
Registered electors		8,545		
Conservative hold		Swing	▲2.1	

=== Prittlewell ===
Prittlewell
Party	Candidate	Votes	%	±%
Alliance	J. Armitage*	2,558	55.7	–2.6
Conservative	S. Houghton	1,622	35.3	+7.0
Labour	L. Davidson	409	8.9	–4.5
Majority		936	20.4	–9.6
Turnout		4,589	46.2	+7.4
Registered electors		9,941		
Alliance hold		Swing	▼4.8	

=== Shoebury ===
Shoebury
Party	Candidate	Votes	%	±%
Conservative	A. Cole	2,772	52.3	+1.1
Alliance	J. Lowe*	1,610	30.4	+14.8
Labour	M. Howells	915	17.3	–15.9
Majority		1,162	21.9	+3.9
Turnout		5,297	40.8	+6.2
Registered electors		12,996		
Conservative hold		Swing	▼6.9	

=== Southchurch ===
Southchurch
Party	Candidate	Votes	%	±%
Conservative	D. Garston*	2,172	47.6	+0.4
Alliance	R. Hendry	1,844	40.4	+5.5
Labour	D. Galvin	543	11.9	–6.0
Majority		328	7.2	–5.1
Turnout		4,559	46.9	+10.9
Registered electors		9,722		
Conservative hold		Swing	▼2.6	

=== St Lukes ===
St Lukes
Party	Candidate	Votes	%	±%
Alliance	H. Gibeon	1,322	38.5	+19.4
Conservative	C. Hudson*	1,167	34.0	+3.3
Labour	D. Waring	948	27.6	–22.6
Majority		155	4.5	N/A
Turnout		3,437	41.1	+10.2
Registered electors		8,358		
Alliance gain from Conservative		Swing	▲8.1	

=== Thorpe ===
Thorpe
Party	Candidate	Votes	%	±%
Conservative	R. Bosch	2,710	62.1	+1.3
Alliance	C. Sweet	1,127	25.8	+2.6
Labour	T. Sandall	527	12.1	–3.9
Majority		1,583	36.3	–1.2
Turnout		4,364	42.4	+11.1
Registered electors		10,303		
Conservative hold		Swing	▼0.7	

=== Victoria ===
Victoria
Party	Candidate	Votes	%	±%
Labour	J. Dunn	1,546	39.2	–13.1
Conservative	R. Davy	1,341	34.0	+7.6
Alliance	E. Gipson	1,058	26.8	+5.4
Majority		205	5.2	–20.7
Turnout		3,945	40.7	+7.2
Registered electors		9,690		
Labour hold		Swing	▼10.4	

=== Westborough ===
Westborough
Party	Candidate	Votes	%	±%
Alliance	G. Cossey	2,124	50.1	–3.6
Conservative	G. Littler*	1,593	37.5	+9.9
Labour	A. Smith	526	12.4	–6.3
Majority		531	12.5	–13.6
Turnout		4,243	46.5	+10.1
Registered electors		9,126		
Alliance gain from Conservative		Swing	▼6.8	
