= 2008 Southend-on-Sea Borough Council election =

2008 UK local government election

← 2007	1 May 2008	2010 →

17 out of 51 seats to Southend-on-Sea Borough Council 26 seats needed for a majority

	First party	Second party
Party	Conservative	Liberal Democrats
Seats won	9	3
Seats after	27	11
Seat change	▼3	▲1
Popular vote	16,880	7,940
Percentage	40.8%	19.2%
Swing	▼0.1%	▼2.9%
	Third party	Fourth party
Party	Independent	Labour
Seats won	4	1
Seats after	7	6
Seat change	▲3	▼1
Popular vote	6,313	5,104
Percentage	15.3%	12.3%
Swing	▲4.4%	▼3.4%
- Winner of each seat at the 2008 Southend-on-Sea Borough Council election.
Council control before election
Conservative
Council control after election
Conservative

The 2008 Southend-on-Sea Borough Council election took place on 1 May 2008 to elect members of Southend-on-Sea Borough Council in Essex, England. One third of the council was up for election and the Conservative Party stayed in overall control of the council.

== Summary ==
=== Campaign ===
Before the election the Conservatives ran the council with 29 seats, compared to 10 for the Liberal Democrats, 7 Labour and 5 independents. The election was seen as being the closest for years with the other parties needing to gain 4 seats from the Conservatives to deprive them of a majority.

There was a record number of candidates in the election, with St Luke's ward having 7 candidates and the British National Party putting up candidates in every ward for the first time.

=== Election result ===
Overall turnout in the election was 34%.

2008 Southend-on-Sea Borough Council election
Party	This election			Full council			This election		
Party	Seats	Net	Seats %	Other	Total	Total %	Votes	Votes %	+/−
Conservative	9	▼3	52.9	18	27	52.9	16,880	40.8	–0.1
Liberal Democrats	3	▲1	17.6	8	11	21.6	7,940	19.2	–2.9
Independent	4	▲3	23.5	3	7	13.7	6,313	15.3	+4.4
Labour	1	▼1	5.9	5	6	11.8	5,104	12.3	–3.4
BNP	0	Steady	0.0	0	0	0.0	4,444	10.7	+4.7
UKIP	0	Steady	0.0	0	0	0.0	523	1.3	–0.4
Green	0	Steady	0.0	0	0	0.0	190	0.5	–1.9

== Ward results ==
=== Belfairs ===
Belfairs
Party	Candidate	Votes	%	±%
Conservative	Stephen Aylen*	1,219	43.9	−3.6
Independent	Maria Jeffery	753	27.1	−4.4
BNP	Garry Curtis-Wiggins	326	11.7	N/A
Liberal Democrats	Michael Woolcott	301	10.8	−3.0
Labour	Teresa Merrison	176	6.3	−0.9
Majority		466	16.8	+0.8
Turnout		2,775	38.1	+2.5
Registered electors		7,279		
Conservative hold		Swing	▲0.4	

=== Blenheim Park ===
Blenheim Park
Party	Candidate	Votes	%	±%
Liberal Democrats	Graham Longley*	966	40.2	−0.2
Conservative	Ray Davy	950	39.5	+8.8
BNP	Barry Harvey	269	11.2	−0.5
Labour	Simon Morley	220	9.1	−1.5
Majority		16	0.7	−9.1
Turnout		2,405	32.1	+0.3
Registered electors		7,499		
Liberal Democrats hold		Swing	▼4.5	

=== Chalkwell ===
Chalkwell
Party	Candidate	Votes	%	±%
Conservative	Ian Robertson*	1,257	56.8	+2.4
Liberal Democrats	Christopher Mallam	363	16.4	−0.1
Labour	Lars Davidsson	306	13.8	+2.1
UKIP	Toni Thornes	154	7.0	−3.0
BNP	James Haggar	132	6.0	N/A
Majority		894	40.4	+2.5
Turnout		2,212	32.1	+2.5
Registered electors		6,900		
Conservative hold		Swing	▲1.3	

=== Eastwood Park ===
Eastwood Park
Party	Candidate	Votes	%	±%
Conservative	Christopher Walker*	1,458	57.5	−5.9
Liberal Democrats	Paul Collins	582	22.9	−0.3
BNP	Helen Darcy	332	13.1	N/A
Labour	Raoul Meade	165	6.5	−7.0
Majority		876	34.5	−5.7
Turnout		2,537	33.7	+3.7
Registered electors		7,531		
Conservative hold		Swing	▼3.1	

=== Kursaal ===
Kursaal
Party	Candidate	Votes	%	±%
Conservative	Blaine Robin	747	38.4	+8.4
Labour	Denis Garne*	741	38.1	−1.8
BNP	Roger Gander	246	12.7	−2.7
Liberal Democrats	Howard Gibeon	210	10.8	−4.0
Majority		6	0.3	N/A
Turnout		1,944	27.8	+2.9
Registered electors		6,991		
Conservative gain from Labour		Swing	▲5.1	

=== Leigh ===
Leigh
Party	Candidate	Votes	%	±%
Liberal Democrats	Alan Crystall*	1,239	53.2	−10.5
Conservative	Victoria Salter	770	33.1	+3.9
BNP	Geoffrey Stringer	160	6.9	N/A
Labour	Helen Symons	160	6.9	−0.2
Majority		469	20.1	−14.3
Turnout		2,329	33.0	+2.0
Registered electors		7,063		
Liberal Democrats hold		Swing	▼7.2	

=== Milton ===
Milton
Party	Candidate	Votes	%	±%
Conservative	Nigel Folkard	928	47.9	+3.6
Labour	Tony Borton	502	25.9	−2.1
Liberal Democrats	Justine Farenden	321	16.6	+6.7
BNP	Derek King	185	9.6	N/A
Majority		426	22.0	+5.6
Turnout		1,936	28.1	+1.6
Registered electors		6,880		
Conservative hold		Swing	▲2.9	

=== Prittlewell ===
Prittlewell
Party	Candidate	Votes	%	±%
Liberal Democrats	Mary Betson	1,032	38.4	−3.2
Conservative	Melvyn Day*	960	35.7	−2.1
UKIP	John Croft	293	10.9	−0.5
Labour	Llynus Pigrem	214	8.0	−1.2
BNP	David Armstrong	191	7.1	N/A
Majority		72	2.7	−1.1
Turnout		2,690	36.6	+2.6
Registered electors		7,341		
Liberal Democrats gain from Conservative		Swing	▼0.6	

=== St Laurence ===
St Laurence
Party	Candidate	Votes	%	±%
Conservative	Mark Flewitt*	1,072	42.5	+4.4
Liberal Democrats	Jill Stone	960	38.1	−5.8
BNP	Keith Barrett	284	11.3	N/A
Labour	Jane Norman	204	8.1	−4.0
Majority		112	4.4	N/A
Turnout		2,520	33.8	+2.1
Registered electors		7,456		
Conservative hold		Swing	▲5.1	

=== St Lukes ===
St Lukes
Party	Candidate	Votes	%	±%
Conservative	Peter Ashley	861	31.3	−1.9
Independent	Paul Van Looy	675	24.6	N/A
Labour	Anne Chalk	535	19.5	−12.9
BNP	Fenton Bowley	415	15.1	−3.6
Liberal Democrats	Robert Howes	145	5.3	−4.1
UKIP	Lawrence Davies	76	2.8	N/A
Green	Cristian Ramis	40	1.5	−4.8
Majority		186	6.8	+6.1
Turnout		2,747	34.7	+5.2
Registered electors		7,929		
Conservative hold				

=== Shoeburyness ===
Shoeburyness
Party	Candidate	Votes	%	±%
Independent	Mike Assenheim	1,009	45.8	+17.8
Conservative	Graham Hill	659	29.9	−3.6
Labour	Chris Gasper	250	11.3	−9.2
BNP	John Moss	211	9.6	−3.8
Liberal Democrats	Jane Dresner	75	3.4	−1.2
Majority		350	15.9	N/A
Turnout		2,204	29.3	−1.0
Registered electors		7,526		
Independent gain from Conservative		Swing	▲10.7	

=== Southchurch ===
Southchurch
Party	Candidate	Votes	%	±%
Independent	Tony Delaney	1,058	40.4	N/A
Conservative	David Garston*	971	37.1	−17.2
BNP	Raymond Weaver	273	10.4	−5.2
Labour	Joyce Mapp	195	7.4	−5.4
Liberal Democrats	Linda Smith	121	4.6	−6.5
Majority		87	3.3	N/A
Turnout		2,618	37.4	+4.3
Registered electors		6,992		
Independent gain from Conservative				

=== Thorpe ===
Thorpe
Party	Candidate	Votes	%	±%
Independent	Mike Stafford	1,918	57.8	+4.0
Conservative	Sally Carr*	1,036	31.2	+1.0
BNP	David Webster	150	4.5	N/A
Liberal Democrats	Colin Davis	110	3.3	−7.6
Labour	Bernard Chalk	105	3.2	−1.9
Majority		882	26.6	+2.9
Turnout		3,319	46.1	−0.2
Registered electors		7,201		
Independent gain from Conservative		Swing	▲1.5	

=== Victoria ===
Victoria
Party	Candidate	Votes	%	±%
Labour	Ian Gilbert	719	37.8	−5.6
Conservative	David Manclark	478	25.1	−0.7
BNP	Alisdair Lewis	351	18.4	+2.2
Liberal Democrats	Ronella Streeter	206	10.8	−3.9
Green	Stephen Jordan	150	7.9	+7.9
Majority		241	12.7	−4.9
Turnout		1,904	26.9	+2.6
Registered electors		7,089		
Labour hold		Swing	▼2.5	

=== West Leigh ===
West Leigh
Party	Candidate	Votes	%	±%
Conservative	John Lamb*	1,673	58.1	−1.6
Liberal Democrats	Margery Jones	821	28.5	+0.8
BNP	Antony Winchester	232	8.1	N/A
Labour	Louise Norman	153	5.3	−0.2
Majority		852	29.6	−2.4
Turnout		2,879	41.9	+3.6
Registered electors		6,873		
Conservative hold		Swing	▼1.2	

=== West Shoebury ===
West Shoebury
Party	Candidate	Votes	%	±%
Conservative	Liz Day	1,340	56.4	+2.0
BNP	Terence Jellis	447	18.8	+2.6
Liberal Democrats	James Allen	319	13.4	+2.5
Labour	Joan Richards	270	11.4	−2.0
Majority		893	37.6	−0.6
Turnout		2,376	32.8	+1.8
Registered electors		7,241		
Conservative hold		Swing	▼0.3	

=== Westborough ===
Westborough
Party	Candidate	Votes	%	±%
Independent	Vel Velmurugan*	812	40.6	−4.5
Conservative	Susan Luty	501	25.1	+3.3
BNP	James Burns	240	12.0	N/A
Labour	Chas Willis	189	9.5	−8.6
Liberal Democrats	Michael O'Connor	169	8.5	−6.4
Independent	Deri Laycock	88	4.4	N/A
Majority		311	15.6	−7.7
Turnout		1,999	28.9	+5.6
Registered electors		6,925		
Independent hold		Swing	▼3.9	
