= 2012 Southend-on-Sea Borough Council election =

2012 UK local government election

- 3 May 2012

17 out of 51 seats to Southend-on-Sea Borough Council 26 seats needed for a majority

	First party	Second party
Party	Conservative	Independent
Seats won	6	5
Seats after	25	10
Seat change	▼3	▲1
Popular vote	12,022	7,552
Percentage	32.7%	20.5%
Swing	▼3.2%	▲2.8%
	Third party	Fourth party
Party	Liberal Democrats	Labour
Seats won	3	3
Seats after	10	6
Seat change	Steady	▲2
Popular vote	5,109	7,100
Percentage	13.9%	19.3%
Swing	▼2.8%	▼0.9%
- Winner of each seat at the 2012 Southend-on-Sea Borough Council election.
Council control before election
Conservative
Council control after election
No overall control

The 2012 Southend-on-Sea Borough Council election took place on 3 May 2012 to elect members of the Southend-on-Sea Borough Council in Essex, England. This was the same day as other local elections.

== Summary ==
=== Election result ===
2012 Southend-on-Sea Borough Council election
Party	This election			Full council			This election		
Party	Seats	Net	Seats %	Other	Total	Total %	Votes	Votes %	+/−
Conservative	6	▼3	35.3	19	25	49.0	12,022	32.7	–3.2
Independent	5	▲1	29.4	5	10	19.6	7,552	20.5	+2.8
Liberal Democrats	3	Steady	17.6	7	10	19.6	5,109	13.9	–2.8
Labour	3	▲2	17.6	3	6	11.8	7,100	19.3	–0.9
UKIP	0	Steady	0.0	0	0	0.0	2,814	7.7	+1.2
English Democrat	0	Steady	0.0	0	0	0.0	1,424	3.9	N/A
Green	0	Steady	0.0	0	0	0.0	707	1.9	–0.4
National Front	0	Steady	0.0	0	0	0.0	56	0.2	±0.0

== Ward results ==
=== Belfairs ===
Belfairs
Party	Candidate	Votes	%	±%
Independent	Stephen Aylen*	814	32.5	N/A
Conservative	Helen Boyd	741	29.6	–22.1
UKIP	Tino Callaghan	313	12.5	–0.5
Labour	Ian Pope	257	10.3	–5.8
Liberal Democrats	Rob Cadman	189	7.6	–11.5
English Democrat	Lisa Simmonds	189	7.6	N/A
Majority		73	2.9	N/A
Turnout		2,508	33.8	–9.0
Registered electors		7,414		
Independent gain from Conservative				

=== Blenheim Park ===
Blenheim Park
Party	Candidate	Votes	%	±%
Liberal Democrats	Graham Longley*	683	30.5	–1.8
Conservative	Julie Cushion	624	27.9	–6.3
Labour	Tony Borton	369	16.5	–2.1
UKIP	James Mills	362	16.2	+1.3
Green	Paul Davison-Holmes	200	8.9	N/A
Majority		59	2.6	N/A
Turnout		2,242	28.4	–10.0
Registered electors		7,908		
Liberal Democrats hold		Swing	▲2.3	

=== Chalkwell ===
Chalkwell
Party	Candidate	Votes	%	±%
Conservative	Ian Robertson*	799	41.7	–5.6
Independent	Nick Ward	490	25.6	+1.7
Labour	Lars Davidsson	366	19.1	+1.0
Liberal Democrats	Norah Goodman	143	7.5	–3.2
English Democrat	Jeremy Moss	117	6.1	N/A
Majority		309	16.1	–7.3
Turnout		1,925	26.2	–10.7
Registered electors		7,351		
Conservative hold		Swing	▼3.7	

=== Eastwood Park ===
Eastwood Park
Party	Candidate	Votes	%	±%
Conservative	Chris Walker*	1,147	50.9	–1.4
UKIP	Keith McLaren	393	17.4	+4.8
Labour	Laura Martin	358	15.9	–0.9
Liberal Democrats	Linda Wells	355	15.8	–2.5
Majority		754	33.5	–0.6
Turnout		2,258	29.9	–9.5
Registered electors		7,563		
Conservative hold		Swing	▼3.1	

=== Kursaal ===
Kursaal
Party	Candidate	Votes	%	±%
Labour	Anne Jones	614	38.8	–5.7
Conservative	Blaine Robin*	496	31.4	+0.1
English Democrat	Stephen Riley	267	16.9	N/A
Green	Simon Cross	126	8.0	N/A
Liberal Democrats	Richard Betson	79	5.0	–3.0
Majority		118	7.4	–5.8
Turnout		1,591	21.3	–8.2
Registered electors		7,460		
Labour gain from Conservative		Swing	▼2.9	

=== Leigh ===
Leigh
Party	Candidate	Votes	%	±%
Liberal Democrats	Alan Crystall*	992	49.4	+5.6
Conservative	Georgina Phillips	622	31.0	–2.3
Labour	Iain Blake-Lawson	394	19.6	+1.9
Majority		370	18.4	+7.9
Turnout		2,039	27.5	–11.2
Registered electors		7,404		
Liberal Democrats hold		Swing	▲4.0	

=== Milton ===
Milton
Party	Candidate	Votes	%	±%
Labour	Julian Ware-Lane	675	35.8	+3.3
Conservative	Nigel Folkard*	607	32.2	–8.3
Independent	Christine Hills	361	19.1	+1.0
Liberal Democrats	Colin Davis	123	6.5	–2.5
English Democrat	Spencer Haggar	122	6.5	N/A
Majority		68	3.6	N/A
Turnout		1,898	24.4	–9.4
Registered electors		7,779		
Labour gain from Conservative		Swing	▲5.8	

=== Prittlewell ===
Prittlewell
Party	Candidate	Votes	%	±%
Liberal Democrats	Mary Betson*	712	30.4	–7.5
Conservative	Sue Abrahams	639	27.3	–3.4
UKIP	Gary Cockrill	589	25.2	+10.0
Labour	Liam Overy	401	17.1	+1.0
Majority		73	3.1	–4.1
Turnout		2,347	30.3	–10.0
Registered electors		7,750		
Liberal Democrats hold		Swing	▼2.1	

=== St. Laurence ===
St. Laurence
Party	Candidate	Votes	%	±%
Conservative	Mark Flewitt*	758	35.9	+0.6
Liberal Democrats	Carole Roast	605	28.6	–3.1
Labour	Reg Copley	407	19.3	+1.2
UKIP	Carl Whitwell	229	10.8	+0.7
English Democrat	Steven Whitman	115	5.4	N/A
Majority		153	7.3	+3.8
Turnout		2,121	28.0	–9.1
Registered electors		7,567		
Conservative hold		Swing	▲1.9	

=== St. Luke's ===
St. Luke's
Party	Candidate	Votes	%	±%
Independent	Brian Ayling	901	41.1	–0.6
Labour	Mike Royston	565	25.8	+4.6
Conservative	Peter Ashley*	527	24.1	+4.6
English Democrat	James Hagger	150	6.8	N/A
Liberal Democrats	Bob Howes	48	2.2	–0.6
Majority		336	15.3	–5.2
Turnout		2,197	27.0	–9.4
Registered electors		8,142		
Independent gain from Conservative		Swing	▼2.6	

=== Shoeburyness ===
Shoeburyness
Party	Candidate	Votes	%	±%
Independent	Mike Assenheim*	1,098	51.7	+3.0
Conservative	Verina Weaver	610	28.7	–6.5
Labour	Chris Gasper	271	12.8	+0.8
English Democrat	Barry Harvey	145	6.8	N/A
Majority		488	23.0	+9.6
Turnout		2,131	25.8	–8.5
Registered electors		8,261		
Independent hold		Swing	▲4.8	

=== Southchurch ===
Southchurch
Party	Candidate	Votes	%	±%
Conservative	David Garston	847	35.8	–12.9
Independent	Claire Bibby	796	33.7	–3.4
Labour	Stacey Phillips	298	12.6	–0.5
English Democrat	Anthony Winchester	141	6.0	N/A
Green	Julian Esposito	127	5.4	+0.9
Independent	Geoff Strobridge	89	3.8	N/A
Liberal Democrats	Robert Brown	66	2.8	–0.8
Majority		51	2.1	+9.5
Turnout		2,370	31.2	–8.6
Registered electors		7,599		
Conservative gain from Independent		Swing	▼4.8	

=== Thorpe ===
Thorpe
Party	Candidate	Votes	%	±%
Independent	Mike Stafford*	2,066	69.8	–3.7
Conservative	Clive Lucas	724	24.4	+6.2
Labour	Jon Key	127	4.3	–0.9
Liberal Democrats	Jim Clinkscales	45	1.5	–1.6
Majority		1,342	45.4	–9.9
Turnout		2,964	39.7	–10.5
Registered electors		7,472		
Independent hold		Swing	▼5.0	

=== Victoria ===
Victoria
Party	Candidate	Votes	%	±%
Labour	Ian Gilbert*	917	50.4	+1.7
Conservative	Del Thomas	462	25.4	–1.3
UKIP	Peter Breuer	141	7.8	N/A
Green	Ian Hurd	115	6.3	–3.6
Liberal Democrats	Ronnie Streeter	70	3.8	–5.3
English Democrat	Fenton Bowley	58	3.2	N/A
National Front	Bernadette Jaggers	56	3.1	–2.5
Majority		455	25.0	+3.0
Turnout		1,824	24.8	–5.0
Registered electors		7,345		
Labour hold		Swing	▲1.5	

=== West Leigh ===
West Leigh
Party	Candidate	Votes	%	±%
Conservative	John Lamb*	1,307	49.7	–0.3
Liberal Democrats	Christopher Bailey	803	30.6	–2.1
Independent	Tony Chytry	278	10.6	N/A
Labour	Jane Norman	240	9.1	–2.2
Majority		504	19.1	+1.8
Turnout		2,638	37.1	–13.1
Registered electors		7,109		
Conservative hold		Swing	▲0.9	

=== West Shoebury ===
West Shoebury
Party	Candidate	Votes	%	±%
Conservative	Liz Day*	860	39.1	–12.6
UKIP	James Moyies	787	35.8	+12.2
Labour	Gary Sergeant	328	14.9	–2.0
English Democrat	Stuart Freeman	120	5.5	N/A
Liberal Democrats	Charlie Row	106	4.8	–3.1
Majority		73	3.3	–24.8
Turnout		2,206	29.5	–10.6
Registered electors		7,473		
Conservative hold		Swing	▼12.4	

=== Westborough ===
Westborough
Party	Candidate	Votes	%	±%
Independent	Dr Vel	551	33.3	–2.2
Labour	Kevin Robinson	513	31.0	+4.5
Conservative	Neil Austin	252	15.2	–2.4
Green	Stephen Jordan	139	8.4	–0.8
Independent	David Glover	108	6.5	N/A
Liberal Democrats	Neil Monnery	90	5.4	–5.9
Majority		38	2.3	–6.7
Turnout		1,661	21.9	–9.7
Registered electors		7,570		
Independent hold		Swing	▼3.4	

== By-elections ==
West Leigh By-Election 23 January 2014
Party	Candidate	Votes	%	±%
Conservative	Georgina Phillips	743	37.2	−12.5
Liberal Democrats	Christopher Bailey	688	34.4	+3.8
UKIP	Tino Callaghan	418	20.9	+20.9
Labour	Jane Norman	149	7.5	−1.6
Majority		55	2.8	
Turnout		1,998		
Conservative hold		Swing		
