= 1992 Southend-on-Sea Borough Council election =

1992 UK local government election

- 7 May 1992

13 out of 39 seats to Southend-on-Sea Borough Council 20 seats needed for a majority

	First party	Second party
Party	Conservative	Liberal Democrats
Seats won	8	3
Seats after	24	8
Seat change	Steady	▼1
Popular vote	24,126	12,048
Percentage	53.8%	26.9%
Swing	▲14.6%	▼3.1%
	Third party	Fourth party
Party	Labour	Ind. Conservative
Seats won	2	0
Seats after	6	1
Seat change	▲1	Steady
Popular vote	6,593	N/A
Percentage	14.7%	N/A
Swing	▼4.4%	▼4.6%
- Winner of each seat at the 1992 Southend-on-Sea Borough Council election.
Council control before election
Conservative
Council control after election
Conservative

The 1992 Southend-on-Sea Council election took place on 7 May 1992 to elect members of Southend-on-Sea Borough Council in Essex, England. One third of the council was up for election.

== Summary ==
=== Election result ===
1992 Southend-on-Sea Borough Council election
Party	This election			Full council			This election		
Party	Seats	Net	Seats %	Other	Total	Total %	Votes	Votes %	+/−
Conservative	8	Steady	61.5	16	24	61.5	24,126	53.8	+14.6
Liberal Democrats	3	▼1	23.1	5	8	20.5	12,048	26.9	–3.1
Labour	2	▲1	15.4	4	6	15.4	6,593	14.7	–4.4
Ind. Conservative	0	Steady	0.0	1	1	2.6	N/A	N/A	–4.6
Independent	0	Steady	0.0	0	0	0.0	1,391	3.1	+0.7
Liberal	0	Steady	0.0	0	0	0.0	650	1.4	–1.1
SDP	0	Steady	0.0	0	0	0.0	31	0.1	N/A

== Ward results ==
=== Belfairs ===
Belfairs
Party	Candidate	Votes	%	±%
Conservative	I. Hornsey*	2,585	62.8	+16.5
Liberal Democrats	G. Longley	1,263	30.7	–14.8
Labour	N. Boorman	193	4.7	–2.0
Liberal	A. Farmer	77	1.9	+0.5
Majority		1,322	32.1	+31.3
Turnout		4,118	46.6	–5.6
Registered electors		8,859		
Conservative gain from Liberal Democrats		Swing	▲15.7	

=== Blenheim ===
Blenheim
Party	Candidate	Votes	%	±%
Conservative	N. Clarke*	1,857	48.3	+9.0
Liberal Democrats	M. Lubel	1,694	44.1	+3.4
Labour	J. Grindley	225	5.9	–4.1
Liberal	V. Wilkinson	69	1.8	–2.9
Majority		163	4.2	N/A
Turnout		3,845	42.1	–6.4
Registered electors		9,139		
Conservative hold		Swing	▲2.8	

=== Chalkwell ===
Chalkwell
Party	Candidate	Votes	%	±%
Conservative	J. Tobin*	2,128	64.1	+9.7
Liberal Democrats	H. Lister-Smith	941	28.4	–4.2
Labour	J. Mapp	249	7.5	–3.1
Majority		1,187	35.7	–5.6
Turnout		3,318	36.2	–5.1
Registered electors		9,167		
Conservative hold		Swing	▲7.0	

=== Eastwood ===
Eastwood
Party	Candidate	Votes	%	±%
Conservative	R. Weaver*	2,624	60.9	+8.7
Liberal Democrats	N. Goodman	1,446	33.6	–5.2
Labour	Z. Chaudhri	183	4.2	–2.8
Liberal	L. Farmer	53	1.2	–0.8
Majority		1,178	27.3	+13.9
Turnout		4,306	40.1	–5.6
Registered electors		10,608		
Conservative hold		Swing	▲7.0	

=== Leigh ===
Leigh
Party	Candidate	Votes	%	±%
Liberal Democrats	O. Shapiro	2,019	48.0	–1.3
Conservative	J. Lambert	1,899	45.2	+4.3
Labour	P. Circus	217	5.2	–2.0
Liberal	T. Marshall	67	1.6	–1.0
Majority		120	2.8	–5.6
Turnout		4,202	46.1	–5.4
Registered electors		9,022		
Liberal Democrats hold		Swing	▼2.8	

=== Milton ===
Milton
Party	Candidate	Votes	%	±%
Conservative	G. Baum*	1,400	58.5	+8.2
Labour	K. Lee	516	21.6	–8.0
Liberal Democrats	S. Hall	447	18.7	+10.0
SDP	M. Sarfas	31	1.3	N/A
Majority		884	36.9	+16.2
Turnout		2,394	31.7	–5.6
Registered electors		7,563		
Conservative hold		Swing	▲8.1	

=== Prittlewell ===
Prittlewell
Party	Candidate	Votes	%	±%
Liberal Democrats	S. Chinn	1,575	45.5	–1.3
Conservative	S. Diggins	1,523	44.0	+4.5
Labour	D. Garne	286	8.3	–5.4
Liberal	G. Wilkinson	81	2.3	N/A
Majority		52	1.5	–5.8
Turnout		3,465	37.0	–6.2
Registered electors		9,380		
Liberal Democrats hold		Swing	▼2.9	

=== Shoebury ===
Shoebury
Party	Candidate	Votes	%	±%
Conservative	A. North*	2,209	49.0	N/A
Independent	R. Hadley	1,391	30.9	+9.5
Labour	A. Chalk	705	15.6	–8.4
Liberal Democrats	J. Magney	160	3.6	+0.2
Liberal	K. Izard	40	0.9	–1.6
Majority		818	18.1	N/A
Turnout		4,505	33.7	–6.7
Registered electors		13,388		
Conservative hold				

=== Southchurch ===
Southchurch
Party	Candidate	Votes	%	±%
Conservative	E. Lockhart*	2,001	70.4	+16.3
Labour	W. McIntyre	538	18.9	–7.1
Liberal Democrats	G. Stride	207	7.3	–3.6
Liberal	T. French	98	3.4	+0.2
Majority		1,463	51.5	+23.4
Turnout		2,844	31.6	–10.1
Registered electors		8,993		
Conservative hold		Swing	▲11.7	

=== St. Luke's ===
St. Luke's
Party	Candidate	Votes	%	±%
Labour	R. Copley*	1,225	47.5	+3.3
Conservative	G. Woolf	1,082	42.0	+17.7
Liberal Democrats	J. Wade	270	10.5	–18.9
Majority		143	5.5	–9.3
Turnout		2,577	31.5	–12.2
Registered electors		8,190		
Labour hold		Swing	▼7.2	

=== Thorpe ===
Thorpe
Party	Candidate	Votes	%	±%
Conservative	S. Ayre*	2,462	73.6	+12.2
Liberal Democrats	M. Hooton	461	13.8	+3.8
Labour	G. Farrer	332	9.9	–5.6
Liberal	S. Marshall	92	2.7	–3.2
Majority		2,001	59.8	+13.9
Turnout		3,347	34.3	–5.1
Registered electors		9,776		
Conservative hold		Swing	▲4.2	

=== Victoria ===
Victoria
Party	Candidate	Votes	%	±%
Labour	A. Hurst*	1,599	53.9	–0.7
Conservative	T. Myall	1,096	36.9	+5.8
Liberal Democrats	A. Miller	274	9.2	±0.0
Majority		503	17.0	–6.5
Turnout		2,969	32.7	–4.4
Registered electors		9,065		
Labour gain from Conservative		Swing	▼3.3	

=== Westborough ===
Westborough
Party	Candidate	Votes	%	±%
Liberal Democrats	H. Gibeon	1,291	43.8	–15.4
Conservative	J. Palmer	1,260	42.7	+18.1
Labour	M. Fletcher	325	11.0	–5.2
Liberal	I. Farmer	73	2.5	N/A
Majority		31	1.1	–33.5
Turnout		2,949	35.1	–2.1
Registered electors		8,416		
Liberal Democrats hold		Swing	▲16.8	

== By-elections ==
=== Belfairs ===
Belfairs by-election: 30 September 1993
Party	Candidate	Votes	%	±%
Liberal Democrats		1,888	55.6	
Conservative		1,191	35.1	
Labour		258	7.6	
Independent		56	1.7	
Majority		697	20.5	
Turnout		3,393	38.0	
Registered electors		8,929		
Liberal Democrats hold		Swing		
