= 1990 Southend-on-Sea Borough Council election =

1990 English local election

- 3 May 1990

13 out of 39 seats to Southend-on-Sea Borough Council 20 seats needed for a majority

| | First party | Second party | Third party |
|---|---|---|---|
| Party | Conservative | Liberal Democrats | Labour |
| Seats won | 10 | 1 | 2 |
| Seats after | 23 | 11 | 5 |
| Seat change | ▲6 | ▼6 | Steady |
| Popular vote | 25,517 | 13,910 | 13,910 |
| Percentage | 44.6% | 24.3% | 28.1% |
| Swing | ▼4.4% | ▼10.9% | ▲12.3% |
- Winner of each seat at the 1990 Southend-on-Sea Borough Council election.
Council control before election
No overall control
Council control after election
Conservative

The 1990 Southend-on-Sea Borough Council election took place on to elect members of Southend-on-Sea Borough Council in Essex, England. This was on the same day as other local elections.

== Summary ==
=== Election result ===
1990 Southend-on-Sea Borough Council election
| Party | This election | | | Full council | | | This election | | |
| Party | Seats | Net | Seats % | Other | Total | Total % | Votes | Votes % | +/− |
|---|---|---|---|---|---|---|---|---|---|
| Conservative | 10 | ▲6 | 76.9 | 13 | 23 | 59.0 | 25,517 | 44.6 | –4.4 |
| Liberal Democrats | 1 | ▼6 | 7.7 | 10 | 11 | 28.2 | 13,910 | 24.3 | –10.9 |
| Labour | 2 | Steady | 15.4 | 3 | 5 | 12.8 | 16,034 | 28.1 | +12.3 |
| SDP | 0 | Steady | 0.0 | 0 | 0 | 0.0 | 731 | 1.3 | N/A |
| Liberal | 0 | Steady | 0.0 | 0 | 0 | 0.0 | 545 | 1.0 | N/A |
| Green | 0 | Steady | 0.0 | 0 | 0 | 0.0 | 215 | 0.4 | N/A |
| Independent | 0 | Steady | 0.0 | 0 | 0 | 0.0 | 204 | 0.4 | N/A |

== Ward results ==
Incumbent councillors standing for re-election are marked with an asterisk (*). Changes in seats do not take into account by-elections or defections.

=== Belfairs ===
Belfairs
| Party | Candidate | Votes | % | ±% |
|---|---|---|---|---|
| Conservative | J. Rowswell | 2,249 | 48.0 | +2.2 |
| Liberal Democrats | S. Pawson | 1,759 | 37.5 | –10.5 |
| Labour | N. Boorman | 679 | 14.5 | +8.3 |
| Majority | | 490 | 10.5 | N/A |
| Turnout | | 4,687 | 53.8 | +6.2 |
| Registered electors | | 8,720 | | |
| Conservative gain from Liberal Democrats | | Swing | ▲6.4 | |

=== Blenheim ===
Blenheim
| Party | Candidate | Votes | % | ±% |
|---|---|---|---|---|
| Conservative | U. Warwick | 1,831 | 39.9 | –5.6 |
| Liberal Democrats | D. Evans | 1,552 | 33.8 | –10.1 |
| Labour | B. Thurston | 917 | 20.0 | +9.4 |
| Liberal | V. Wilkinson | 285 | 6.2 | N/A |
| Majority | | 279 | 6.1 | +4.5 |
| Turnout | | 4,585 | 50.4 | +8.0 |
| Registered electors | | 9,096 | | |
| Conservative gain from Liberal Democrats | | Swing | ▲2.3 | |

=== Chalkwell ===
Chalkwell
| Party | Candidate | Votes | % | ±% |
|---|---|---|---|---|
| Conservative | C. Latham | 2,214 | 50.0 | –3.6 |
| Liberal Democrats | J. Wade* | 1,534 | 34.7 | –3.5 |
| Labour | J. Mapp | 532 | 12.0 | +3.8 |
| Liberal | G. Wilkinson | 146 | 3.3 | N/A |
| Majority | | 680 | 15.4 | +0.1 |
| Turnout | | 4,426 | 50.0 | +10.0 |
| Registered electors | | 8,852 | | |
| Conservative gain from Liberal Democrats | | Swing | ▲0.1 | |

=== Eastwood ===
Eastwood
| Party | Candidate | Votes | % | ±% |
|---|---|---|---|---|
| Conservative | H. Briggs | 2,629 | 49.8 | –1.3 |
| Liberal Democrats | D. Elf* | 2,006 | 38.0 | –3.2 |
| Labour | Z. Chaudhri | 639 | 12.1 | +4.4 |
| Majority | | 623 | 11.8 | +1.9 |
| Turnout | | 5,274 | 49.9 | +12.1 |
| Registered electors | | 10,569 | | |
| Conservative gain from Liberal Democrats | | Swing | ▲1.0 | |

=== Leigh ===
Leigh
| Party | Candidate | Votes | % | ±% |
|---|---|---|---|---|
| Conservative | B. Isaacs | 2,264 | 47.1 | +3.8 |
| Liberal Democrats | P. Wexham | 1,921 | 39.9 | –8.9 |
| Labour | P. Circus | 624 | 13.0 | +5.1 |
| Majority | | 343 | 7.1 | N/A |
| Turnout | | 4,809 | 55.7 | +9.2 |
| Registered electors | | 8,631 | | |
| Conservative gain from Liberal Democrats | | Swing | ▲6.4 | |

=== Milton ===
Milton
| Party | Candidate | Votes | % | ±% |
|---|---|---|---|---|
| Conservative | K. Cater* | 1,402 | 43.4 | –9.1 |
| Labour | K. Lee | 1,025 | 31.7 | +7.9 |
| Liberal Democrats | A. Petchey | 632 | 19.6 | –4.0 |
| Liberal | T. Marshall | 114 | 3.5 | N/A |
| Independent | S. Ford | 59 | 1.8 | N/A |
| Majority | | 377 | 11.7 | –17.0 |
| Turnout | | 3,232 | 45.6 | +15.7 |
| Registered electors | | 7,088 | | |
| Conservative hold | | Swing | ▼8.5 | |

=== Prittlewell ===
Prittlewell
| Party | Candidate | Votes | % | ±% |
|---|---|---|---|---|
| Conservative | B. Allen | 1,608 | 36.4 | –1.2 |
| Liberal Democrats | A. Miller | 1,496 | 33.8 | –17.6 |
| Labour | D. Garne | 1,101 | 24.9 | +13.8 |
| Green | A. Wortham | 215 | 4.9 | N/A |
| Majority | | 112 | 2.5 | N/A |
| Turnout | | 4,420 | 47.0 | +9.0 |
| Registered electors | | 9,404 | | |
| Conservative gain from Liberal Democrats | | Swing | ▼8.2 | |

=== Shoebury ===
Shoebury
| Party | Candidate | Votes | % | ±% |
|---|---|---|---|---|
| Conservative | D. Ascroft* | 3,089 | 52.8 | –10.9 |
| Labour | C. Dandridge | 2,758 | 47.2 | +24.7 |
| Majority | | 331 | 5.7 | –35.5 |
| Turnout | | 5,847 | 45.8 | +13.8 |
| Registered electors | | 12,766 | | |
| Conservative hold | | Swing | ▼17.8 | |

=== Southchurch ===
Southchurch
| Party | Candidate | Votes | % | ±% |
|---|---|---|---|---|
| Conservative | M. Haine* | 2,373 | 52.1 | –10.3 |
| Labour | W. McIntyre | 1,723 | 37.8 | +17.4 |
| Liberal Democrats | R. More | 458 | 10.1 | –7.1 |
| Majority | | 650 | 14.3 | –27.7 |
| Turnout | | 4,554 | 50.7 | +15.6 |
| Registered electors | | 8,982 | | |
| Conservative hold | | Swing | ▼13.9 | |

=== St Lukes ===
St Lukes
| Party | Candidate | Votes | % | ±% |
|---|---|---|---|---|
| Labour | N. Smith* | 1,774 | 50.2 | +2.3 |
| Conservative | P. Hawke | 964 | 27.3 | –5.0 |
| SDP | G. Steel | 731 | 20.7 | N/A |
| Independent | B. Phillips | 67 | 1.9 | N/A |
| Majority | | 810 | 22.9 | +7.3 |
| Turnout | | 3,536 | 46.0 | +8.2 |
| Registered electors | | 7,687 | | |
| Labour hold | | Swing | ▲3.7 | |

=== Thorpe ===
Thorpe
| Party | Candidate | Votes | % | ±% |
|---|---|---|---|---|
| Conservative | N. Moss* | 2,959 | 65.2 | –0.5 |
| Labour | G. Farrer | 1,023 | 22.5 | +8.9 |
| Liberal Democrats | N. Stimpson | 478 | 10.5 | –10.2 |
| Independent | D. Melvin | 78 | 1.7 | N/A |
| Majority | | 1,936 | 42.7 | –2.3 |
| Turnout | | 4,538 | 47.5 | +12.4 |
| Registered electors | | 9,550 | | |
| Conservative hold | | Swing | ▼4.7 | |

=== Victoria ===
Victoria
| Party | Candidate | Votes | % | ±% |
|---|---|---|---|---|
| Labour | A. Dunn* | 2,253 | 61.1 | +27.4 |
| Conservative | R. Davy | 1,064 | 28.9 | –24.2 |
| Liberal Democrats | J. Kaufman | 368 | 10.0 | –3.2 |
| Majority | | 1,189 | 32.3 | N/A |
| Turnout | | 3,685 | 43.4 | +7.5 |
| Registered electors | | 8,491 | | |
| Labour hold | | Swing | ▲25.8 | |

=== Westborough ===
Westborough
| Party | Candidate | Votes | % | ±% |
|---|---|---|---|---|
| Liberal Democrats | J. Sibley | 1,706 | 47.9 | –3.1 |
| Labour | M. Fletcher | 986 | 27.7 | +12.6 |
| Conservative | A. Brown | 871 | 24.4 | –9.4 |
| Majority | | 720 | 20.2 | +3.0 |
| Turnout | | 3,563 | 43.2 | +8.9 |
| Registered electors | | 8,248 | | |
| Liberal Democrats hold | | Swing | ▼7.9 | |

== By-elections ==
=== Victoria ===
Victoria by-election: 7 February 1991
| Party | Candidate | Votes | % | ±% |
|---|---|---|---|---|
| Labour | | 650 | 51.1 | |
| Conservative | | 426 | 33.5 | |
| Liberal Democrats | | 96 | 7.6 | |
| Independent | | 79 | 6.2 | |
| Other | | 20 | 1.6 | |
| Majority | | 224 | 17.6 | |
| Turnout | | 1,271 | 16.0 | |
| Registered electors | | 7,944 | | |
| Labour hold | | Swing | | |
