= 1984 Southend-on-Sea Borough Council election =

UK local election

- 3 May 1984

14 out of 39 seats to Southend-on-Sea Borough Council 20 seats needed for a majority

	First party	Second party	Third party
Party	Conservative	Alliance	Labour
Seats won	6	5	3
Seats after	25	11	3
Seat change	▼2	▲2	Steady
Popular vote	20,621	15,732	11,525
Percentage	43.0%	32.8%	24.0%
Swing	▼5.9%	▼0.4%	▲6.1%
- Winner of each seat at the 1984 Southend-on-Sea Borough Council election.
Council control before election
Conservative
Council control after election
Conservative

The 1984 Southend-on-Sea Borough Council election took place on 3 May 1984 to elect members of Southend-on-Sea Borough Council in Essex, England. This was on the same day as other local elections.

== Summary ==
=== Election result ===
1984 Southend-on-Sea Borough Council election
Party	This election			Full council			This election		
Party	Seats	Net	Seats %	Other	Total	Total %	Votes	Votes %	+/−
Conservative	6	▼2	42.9	19	25	64.1	20,621	43.0	–5.9
Alliance	5	▲2	35.7	6	11	28.2	15,732	32.8	–0.4
Labour	3	Steady	21.4	0	3	7.7	11,525	24.0	+6.1
Independent	0	Steady	0.0	0	0	0.0	98	0.2	N/A

== Ward results ==
Incumbent councillors standing for re-election are marked with an asterisk (*). Changes in seats do not take into account by-elections or defections.

=== Belfairs ===
Belfairs
Party	Candidate	Votes	%	±%
Alliance	R. Streeter	2,328	52.0	+9.0
Conservative	R. Marriott*	1,845	41.2	–8.0
Labour	P. Haines	306	6.8	–1.0
Majority		483	10.8	N/A
Turnout		4,479	46.1	–1.3
Registered electors		9,712		
Alliance gain from Conservative		Swing	▲8.5	

=== Blenheim ===
Blenheim
Party	Candidate	Votes	%	±%
Conservative	N. Clarke*	1,570	45.3	–2.1
Alliance	H. Gibeon	1,176	33.9	–1.9
Labour	M. Howard	723	20.8	+3.9
Majority		394	11.4	–0.2
Turnout		3,469	35.2	–7.4
Registered electors		9,866		
Conservative hold		Swing	▼0.1	

=== Chalkwell ===
Chalkwell
Party	Candidate	Votes	%	±%
Conservative	J. Tobin	1,659	49.4	–6.1
Alliance	A. Petchey	1,439	42.8	+5.9
Labour	A. Rothwell	263	7.8	+0.2
Majority		220	6.5	–12.1
Turnout		3,361	36.0	–4.9
Registered electors		9,631		
Conservative hold		Swing	▼6.0	

=== Eastwood ===
Eastwood
Party	Candidate	Votes	%	±%
Alliance	N. Goodman	1,946	49.7	+3.1
Conservative	M. Myers*	1,601	40.9	–4.7
Labour	R. Kennedy	365	9.3	+1.5
Majority		335	8.8	+7.8
Turnout		3,912	36.2	–3.0
Registered electors		10,799		
Alliance gain from Conservative		Swing	▲3.9	

=== Leigh ===
Leigh
Party	Candidate	Votes	%	±%
Alliance	G. Robson*	2,145	53.0	+0.9
Conservative	A. Hall	1,618	40.0	–2.1
Labour	L. Davidson	282	7.0	+1.8
Majority		528	13.0	+3.0
Turnout		4,045	43.5	–7.5
Registered electors		9,339		
Alliance hold		Swing	▲1.5	

=== Milton ===
Milton
Party	Candidate	Votes	%	±%
Conservative	G. Baum*	1,195	56.1	+0.5
Labour	K. Kirk	936	43.9	+17.2
Majority		259	12.2	–16.8
Turnout		2,131	25.9	–6.2
Registered electors		8,268		
Conservative hold		Swing	▼8.4	

=== Prittlewell ===
Prittlewell
Party	Candidate	Votes	%	±%
Alliance	P. Herbert*	1,981	52.8	+5.5
Conservative	J. Gibb	1,271	33.9	–5.0
Labour	S. Laycock	497	13.3	–0.6
Majority		710	18.9	+10.5
Turnout		3,749	37.8	–5.1
Registered electors		9,937		
Alliance hold		Swing	▲5.3	

=== Shoebury ===
Shoebury
Party	Candidate	Votes	%	±%
Conservative	A. North	1,973	48.2	–2.3
Labour	G. Caplan*	1,622	39.7	+4.3
Alliance	J. Ruhier	495	12.1	–2.0
Majority		351	8.6	–6.6
Turnout		4,090	34.5	–8.0
Registered electors		11,881		
Conservative gain from Labour		Swing	▼3.3	

=== Southminster ===
Southminster
Party	Candidate	Votes	%	±%
Conservative	E. Lockhart*	1,843	62.0	+1.8
Labour	G. White	649	21.8	+3.6
Alliance	S. Gibeon	479	16.1	–5.5
Majority		1,194	40.2	+1.7
Turnout		2,971	29.7	–11.4
Registered electors		9,999		
Conservative hold		Swing	▼0.9	

=== St Lukes ===
St Lukes
Party	Candidate	Votes	%	±%
Labour	R. Copley*	1,248	49.3	+12.4
Conservative	R. Reid	906	35.8	–2.5
Alliance	Y. Rushman	379	15.0	–9.9
Majority		342	13.5	N/A
Turnout		2,533	30.1	–6.3
Registered electors		8,412		
Labour hold		Swing	▲7.5	

=== Thorpe ===
Thorpe
Party	Candidate	Votes	%	±%
Conservative	G. Ayre	1,892	70.1	+1.7
Labour	V. Heffer	423	15.7	+2.5
Alliance	A. Polley	384	14.2	–4.2
Majority		1,469	54.4	+4.4
Turnout		2,699	26.2	–13.0
Registered electors		10,295		
Conservative hold		Swing	▼0.4	

=== Victoria ===
Victoria
Party	Candidate	Votes	%	±%
Labour	A. Hurst	1,825	51.9	
Labour	A. Dunn	1,805	51.3	
Conservative	S. Carr	1,055	30.0	
Conservative	C. Gymer	1,030	29.3	
Alliance	J. Overy	635	18.0	
Alliance	N. Baker	619	17.6	
Independent	C. Smith	98	1.9	
Turnout		~3,653	37.9	+3.4
Registered electors		9,639		
Labour hold				
Labour gain from Conservative				

=== Westborough ===
Westborough
Party	Candidate	Votes	%	±%
Alliance	R. Price*	1,726	49.7	+9.1
Conservative	J. Rowswell	1,163	33.5	–9.9
Labour	A. Smith	581	16.7	+0.8
Majority		563	16.2	N/A
Turnout		3,470	38.6	–7.8
Registered electors		9,004		
Alliance hold		Swing	▲8.5	

== By-elections ==
=== Leigh ===
Leigh by-election: 7 March 1985
Party	Candidate	Votes	%	±%
Alliance		2,055	57.5	
Conservative		1,198	33.5	
Labour		233	6.5	
Green		90	2.5	
Majority		857	24.0	
Turnout		3,576	38.5	
Registered electors		9,288		
Alliance hold		Swing		

=== Belfairs ===
Belfairs by-election: 24 October 1985
Party	Candidate	Votes	%	±%
Alliance		1,967	53.5	
Conservative		1,401	38.1	
Labour		308	8.4	
Majority		566	15.4	
Turnout		3,676	38.0	
Registered electors		9,674		
Alliance hold		Swing		

=== Leigh ===
Leigh by-election: 20 February 1986
Party	Candidate	Votes	%	±%
Alliance		1,688	60.4	
Conservative		883	31.6	
Labour		225	8.0	
Majority		805	28.8	
Turnout		2,796	30.7	
Registered electors		9,107		
Alliance hold		Swing		
