= Westborough (ward) =

British political subdivision

- Electoral ward for the Southend-on-Sea City Council
- Westborough ward boundaries since 2001
- District: Southend-on-Sea
- County: Essex
- Population: 11,284 (2021)
- Major settlements: Westcliff-on-Sea
- Area: 0.9172 square kilometres (0.3541 sq mi)

Current electoral ward
- Created: 1974
- Number of members: 3
- Councillors: Kevin Robinson; Anne Jones; Pamela Kinsella
- ONS code: 00KFNE
- GSS code: E05002226

Westborough is an electoral ward of Southend-on-Sea. The ward has existed since the creation of the district on 1 April 1974 and first used at the 1973 elections. The ward returns three councillors to Southend-on-Sea City Council. It was subject to boundary revisions in 1976 and 2001. The ward covers part of Westcliff-on-Sea.

== Southend-on-Sea council elections since 2001 ==
There was a revision of ward boundaries in Southend-on-Sea in 2001. Westborough lost some territory in the west between Nelson Road and Southbourne Grove to the new ward of Blenheim Park and in the east between Gainsborough Drive and Wenham Drive to the Prittlewell ward. All seats were up for election in 2001. The subsequent election cycle for the first Westborough seat was 2002, 2006, 2010, 2014, 2018 and 2022. The cycle for the second seat was 2003, 2007, 2011, 2015, 2019 and 2023. The cycle for the third seat was 2004, 2008, 2012, 2016, 2021 and 2024.

=== 2024 election ===
The election took place on 2 May 2024.

2024 Southend-on-Sea City Council election: Westborough
Party	Candidate	Votes	%	±%
Labour	Pamela Kinsella	1,063	53.8	–3.1
Conservative	Dr Vel	375	19.0	+0.5
Green	Stephen Jordan	263	13.3	+1.4
Liberal Democrats	Suzanna Edey	186	9.4	+0.8
Confelicity	Noah Hughes	74	3.7	–0.4
Majority		688	34.8	–3.6
Turnout		1,977	25.8	+1.8
Labour hold		Swing	▼1.8	

=== 2023 election ===
The election took place on 4 May 2023.

2023 Southend-on-Sea City Council election: Westborough
Party	Candidate	Votes	%	±%
Labour	Anne Jones	1,038	56.9	–5.3
Conservative	Andy Wilkins	337	18.5	–0.5
Green	Stephen Jordan	217	11.9	+3.7
Liberal Democrats	Suzanna Edey	157	8.6	–0.7
Confelicity	Connor Bines	75	4.1	+2.7
Majority		701	38.4	–4.8
Turnout		1,830	24.0	
Registered electors		7,625		
Labour hold		Swing	▼2.4	

=== 2022 election ===
The election took place on 4 May 2022.

2022 Southend-on-Sea Borough Council election: Westborough
Party	Candidate	Votes	%	±%
Labour	Kevin Robinson	1,197	62.2	+25.3
Conservative	Tamkeen Shaikh	366	19.0	−3.0
Liberal Democrats	Suzanna Edey	179	9.3	−4.5
Green	Stephanie Golder	157	8.2	−0.6
Confelicity	TK Gondo	26	1.4	N/A
Majority		831	43.2	
Turnout		1,925		
Labour hold		Swing	▲14.2	

=== 2021 election ===
The election took place on 6 May 2021.

2021 Southend-on-Sea Borough Council election: Westborough
Party	Candidate	Votes	%	±%
Labour	Aston Line	920	43.7	+3.5
Labour	Anne Jones	873	41.4	+1.2
Conservative	Colin Campbell	550	26.1	+10.2
Independent	Dr Vel	424	20.1	+1.8
Liberal Democrats	Suzanna Edey	344	16.3	+9.2
Conservative	Tamkeen Shaikh	343	16.3	+0.4
Liberal Democrats	David Webb	327	15.5	+8.4
Green	Stephen Jordan	220	10.4	−1.7
Green	Vida Guilford	176	8.4	−3.7
Psychedelic Future	Jason Pilley	37	1.8	New
Turnout		—	54.6	
Labour hold				
Labour hold				

=== 2019 election ===
The election took place on 2 May 2019.

2019 Southend-on-Sea Borough Council election: Westborough
Party	Candidate	Votes	%	±%
Labour	Charles Willis	857	40.2	–12.2
Independent	Dr Vel	391	18.3	New
Conservative	Jack Warren	340	15.9	–8.8
Green	Stephen Jordan	259	12.1	+6.1
Liberal Democrats	Billy Boulton	152	7.1	–0.9
Independent	Alan Hart	134	6.3	–2.6
Majority		466	21.8	–7.0
Turnout		2,133	28.0	—
Labour hold		Swing	–15.3	

=== 2018 election ===
The election took place on 3 May 2018.

2018 Southend-on-Sea Borough Council election: Westborough
Party	Candidate	Votes	%	±%
Labour	Kevin Robinson	1,146	52.4	▲18.5
Conservative	Jack Warren	539	24.7	▲10.2
Independent	Alan Hart	194	8.9	▲5.1
Liberal Democrats	Billy Boulton	175	8.0	▲2.2
Green	Paul Mansfield	131	6.0	▼0.1
Majority		607	27.8	—
Turnout		2,185	28.5	—
Labour hold		Swing	▲4.2	

=== 2016 election ===
The election took place on 5 May 2016.

2016 Southend-on-Sea Borough Council election: Westborough
Party	Candidate	Votes	%	±%
Labour	Anne Jones	693	33.9	+0.6
Independent	Dr Vel	451	22.1	−11.2†
Conservative	Daryl Peagram	317	15.5	−13.9
UKIP	Frank Snell	263	12.9	N/A
Green	Paul Mansfield	124	6.1	−5.6
Liberal Democrats	Pamela Austin	119	5.8	−2.2
Independent	Alan Hart	77	3.8	−0.3
Majority				
Turnout			27.63	
Labour gain from Independent		Swing		

=== 2015 election ===
The election took place on 7 May 2015.

2015 Southend-on-Sea Borough Council election: Westborough
Party	Candidate	Votes	%	±%
Labour	Charles Willis	1,438	33.3	
Conservative	Daryl Peagram	1,273	29.4	
Independent	David Webb	587	13.6	
Green	Paul Mansfield	506	11.7	
Liberal Democrats	David Barrett	344	8.0	
Independent	Alan Hart	176	4.1	
Majority				
Turnout				
Labour gain from Independent		Swing		

=== 2014 election ===
The election took place on 22 May 2014.

2014 Southend-on-Sea Borough Council election: Westborough
Party	Candidate	Votes	%	±%
Labour	Kevin Robinson	779	33.2	+2.2
Labour	Michael Royston	726		
UKIP	John Stansfield	535	22.8	New
UKIP	Carl Whitwell	474		
Liberal Democrats	Peter Hill	435	18.5	+13.1
Liberal Democrats	Paul Collins	411		
Conservative	David Burzotta	391	16.7	+2.5
Conservative	Jenny Snoad	284		
Independent	Alan Hart	207	8.8	New
Majority				
Turnout		4,264	29.23	
Labour gain from Liberal Democrats		Swing		
Labour gain from Independent		Swing		

=== 2012 election ===
The election took place on 3 May 2012.

2012 Southend-on-Sea Borough Council election: Westborough
Party	Candidate	Votes	%	±%
Independent	Dr Vel	551	33.3	
Labour	Kevin Robinson	513	31.0	
Conservative	Neil Austin	252	15.2	
Green	Stephen Jordan	139	8.4	
Independent	David Glover	108	6.5	
Liberal Democrats	Neil Monnery	90	5.4	
Majority				
Turnout		1,661	21.94	
Independent hold		Swing		

=== 2011 election ===
The election took place on 5 May 2011.

2011 Southend-on-Sea Borough Council election: Westborough
Party	Candidate	Votes	%	±%
Independent	Martin Terry	835	35.5	
Labour	Kevin Robinson	623	26.5	
Conservative	Roger Weaver	415	17.6	
Liberal Democrats	Robert Howes	265	11.3	
Green	Douglas Rouxel	217	9.2	
Majority				
Turnout				
Independent hold		Swing		

=== 2010 election ===
The election took place on 6 May 2010.

2010 Southend-on-Sea Borough Council election: Westborough
Party	Candidate	Votes	%	±%
Liberal Democrats	Paul Collins	1,023	23.8	+15.3
Conservative	Melvyn Day	1,006	23.4	–1.7
Independent	Tania Painton	913	21.2	New
Labour	Kevin Robinson	838	19.5	+10.0
BNP	Lancelot Martin	218	5.1	–6.9
UKIP	Lucky Siyafa	175	4.1	New
Green	Rita Wood	129	3.0	New
Majority				
Turnout				
Liberal Democrats gain from Independent		Swing		

=== 2008 election ===
The election took place on 1 May 2008.

2008 Southend-on-Sea Borough Council election: Westborough
Party	Candidate	Votes	%	±%
Independent	Vel Velmurugan	812	40.6	−4.5
Conservative	Susan Luty	501	25.1	+3.3
BNP	James Burns	240	12.0	+12.0
Labour	Chas Willis	189	9.5	−8.6
Liberal Democrats	Michael O'Connor	169	8.5	−6.4
Independent	Deri Laycock	88	4.4	+4.4
Majority		311	15.6	−7.7
Turnout		1,999	28.9	+5.6
Independent hold		Swing		

=== 2007 election ===
The election took place on 3 May 2007.

2007 Southend-on-Sea Borough Council election: Westborough
Party	Candidate	Votes	%	±%
Independent	Martin Terry	768	45.1	+9.6
Conservative	Stephen Buckley	372	21.8	+1.3
Labour	Tony Borton	309	18.1	−2.7
Liberal Democrats	Stephen Vincent	254	14.9	−8.3
Majority		396	23.3	+11.0
Turnout		1,703	23.3	−3.7
Independent hold		Swing		

=== 2006 election ===
The election took place on 4 May 2006.

2006 Southend-on-Sea Borough Council election: Westborough
Party	Candidate	Votes	%	±%
Independent	Tania Painton	673	35.5	−11.3
Liberal Democrats	Stephen Vincent	440	23.2	+2.8
Labour	Teresa Merrison	394	20.8	+4.7
Conservative	Richard Waite	389	20.5	+3.7
Majority		233	12.3	−14.1
Turnout		1,896	27.0	−5.2
Independent gain from Labour		Swing		

=== 2004 election ===
The election took place on 10 June 2004.

2004 Southend-on-Sea Borough Council election: Westborough
Party	Candidate	Votes	%	±%
Independent	Marimuthu Velmurugan	1,005	46.8	+9.9
Liberal Democrats	George Lewin	438	20.4	+0.1
Conservative	Ahmad Khwaja	361	16.8	+3.8
Labour	Julian Ware-Lane	345	16.1	−6.6
Majority		567	26.4	+12.2
Turnout		2,149	32.2	+7.1
Independent gain from Liberal Democrats		Swing		

=== 2003 election ===
The election took place on 1 May 2003.

2003 Southend-on-Sea Borough Council election: Westborough
Party	Candidate	Votes	%	±%
Independent	Martin Terry	640	36.9	+11.4
Labour	Marimuthu Velmurugan	393	22.7	−4.3
Liberal Democrats	Colin Ritchie	352	20.3	−3.4
Conservative	Emma Hill	226	13.0	−4.6
Independent	Trevor Oakley	66	3.8	+3.8
Green	Rita Wood	57	3.3	−2.8
Majority		247	14.2	
Turnout		1,734	25.1	−0.2
Independent gain from Labour		Swing		

=== 2002 election ===
The election took place on 2 May 2002.

2002 Southend-on-Sea Borough Council election: Westborough
Party	Candidate	Votes	%	±%
Labour	Teresa Merrison	487	27.0	
Independent	Martin Terry	460	25.5	
Liberal Democrats	Colin Ritchie	428	23.7	
Conservative	Mark Newman	318	17.6	
Green	Rita Wood	110	6.1	
Majority		27	1.5	
Turnout		1,803	25.3	−23.2
Labour hold		Swing		

=== 2001 election ===
The election took place on 7 June 2001.

2001 Southend-on-Sea Borough Council election: Westborough
Party	Candidate	Votes	%	±%
Liberal Democrats	Jean Sibley	1,164		
Labour	Marimuthu Velmurugan	990		
Labour	Teresa Merrison	928		
Labour	Charles Willis	846		
Liberal Democrats	Colin Ritchie	839		
Liberal Democrats	Stephen Newton	807		
Conservative	Mark Newman	796		
Conservative	David Nicklin	779		
Conservative	Kathleen Meager	695		
Independent	Mark Flewitt	672		
Independent	Martin Terry	616		
Turnout		9,132	48.5	
Liberal Democrats win (new boundaries)				
Labour win (new boundaries)				
Labour win (new boundaries)				

== 1997–2001 Southend-on-Sea council elections ==
Westborough ward boundaries from 1976 to 2001

The electoral cycle was restarted on 1 May 1997 without change of ward boundaries, to coincide with Southend-on-Sea Borough Council becoming a unitary authority on 1 April 1998. All seats were up for election in 1997.

=== 2000 election ===
The election took place on 4 May 2000.

2000 Southend-on-Sea Borough Council election: Westborough
Party	Candidate	Votes	%	±%
Liberal Democrats	Mary Lubel	911	43.8	+2.6
Conservative	Michael Samuel	661	31.8	+14.0
Labour	Raymond Hales	507	24.4	−16.6
Majority		250	12.0	+11.8
Turnout		2,079	24.3	−5.0
Liberal Democrats hold		Swing		

=== 1999 election ===
The election took place on 6 May 1999.

1999 Southend-on-Sea Borough Council election: Westborough
Party	Candidate	Votes	%	±%
Liberal Democrats	Howard Gibeon	1,038	41.2	
Labour	Mark Flewitt	1,034	41.0	
Conservative	Michael Samuel	448	17.8	
Majority		4	0.2	
Turnout		2,520	29.3	
Liberal Democrats hold		Swing		

=== 1997 election ===
The election took place on 1 May 1997.

1997 Southend-on-Sea Borough Council election: Westborough
Party	Candidate	Votes	%	±%
Liberal Democrats	J. Sibley	2,501	47.9	
Liberal Democrats	M. Lubel	2,498		
Liberal Democrats	H. Gibeon	2,238		
Labour	B. Neal	1,429	27.4	
Labour	M. Flewitt	1,400		
Labour	P. Hannan	1,387		
Conservative	S. Compton	1,287	24.7	
Conservative	R. Brown	1,149		
Conservative	M. Samuel	1,083		
Turnout			62.9	
Liberal Democrats hold				
Liberal Democrats hold				
Liberal Democrats hold				

== 1976–1997 Southend-on-Sea council elections ==
There was a revision of ward boundaries in Southend-on-Sea in 1976.

=== 1996 election ===
The election took place on 2 May 1996.

1996 Southend-on-Sea Borough Council election: Westborough
Party	Candidate	Votes	%	±%
Liberal Democrats	H. Gibeon	1,342	51.7	
Labour	M. Royston	865	33.3	
Conservative	R. Brown	387	14.9	
Majority			18.4	
Turnout			29.8	
Liberal Democrats hold		Swing		

=== 1995 election ===
The election took place on 4 May 1995.

1995 Southend-on-Sea Borough Council election: Westborough
Party	Candidate	Votes	%	±%
Liberal Democrats	M. Lubel	1,460	52.5	
Labour	M. Royston	890	32.0	
Conservative	J. Lambert	431	15.5	
Majority			20.5	
Turnout			31.5	
Liberal Democrats hold		Swing		

=== 1994 election ===
The election took place on 5 May 1994.

1994 Southend-on-Sea Borough Council election: Westborough
Party	Candidate	Votes	%	±%
Liberal Democrats	J. Sibley	2,019	62.6	
Labour	M. Royston	644	20.0	
Conservative	J. Lambert	560	17.4	
Majority			42.6	
Turnout			38.2	
Liberal Democrats hold		Swing		

=== 1992 election ===
The election took place on 7 May 1992.

1992 Southend-on-Sea Borough Council election: Westborough
Party	Candidate	Votes	%	±%
Liberal Democrats	H. Gibeon	1,291	43.8	
Conservative	J. Palmer	1,260	42.7	
Labour	M. Fletcher	325	11.0	
Liberal	I. Farmer	73	2.5	
Majority			1.1	
Turnout			35.1	
Liberal Democrats hold		Swing		

=== 1991 election ===
The election took place on 2 May 1991.

1991 Southend-on-Sea Borough Council election: Westborough
Party	Candidate	Votes	%	±%
Liberal Democrats	G. Cossey	1,876	59.2	
Conservative	R. Brown	778	24.6	
Labour	K. Stone	513	16.2	
Majority			34.6	
Turnout			37.2	
Liberal Democrats hold		Swing		
