= Milton (Southend-on-Sea ward) =

British political subdivision

- Electoral ward for the Southend-on-Sea City Council
- Milton ward boundaries since 2001
- District: Southend-on-Sea
- County: Essex
- Population: 11,692 (2021)
- Area: 1.635 square kilometres (0.631 sq mi)

Current electoral ward
- Created: 1974
- Number of members: 3
- Councillors: Cheryl Nevin; Maxine Sadza; Sam Allen
- ONS code: 00KFMW
- GSS code: E05002218

Milton is an electoral ward of Southend-on-Sea. The ward has existed since the creation of the district on 1 April 1974 and first used at the 1973 elections. The ward returns three councillors to Southend-on-Sea City Council. It was subject to boundary revisions in 1976 and 2001. The ward covers parts of Southend-on-Sea town centre and Westcliff-on-Sea.

== List of councillors ==
The ward has been represented by three councillors since the first election in 1973.

Term	Councillor	Party
1973–1996	G. Baum	Conservative
1973–1978	N. Goodman	Conservative
1973–1995	J. Carlile	Conservative
1978–1994	K. Cater	Conservative
1994–1999	K. Lee	Labour
1995–1997	P. Hawkins	Labour
1996–1997; 1999–2001	Lilias Felton	Labour
1997–2008	Raymond Davy	Conservative
1997–1999	Joyce Lambert	Conservative
1999–2000; 2019–2024	Stephen George	Labour
2000–2019	Jonathan Garston	Conservative
2001–2010	Ann Robertson	Conservative
2008–2012	Nigel Folkard	Conservative
2010–2014	Maria Caunce	Conservative
2012–2019	Julian Ware-Lane	Labour
2014–2022; 2023–present	Cheryl Nevin	Labour
2019–2023	Kay Mitchell	Labour
2022–present	Maxine Sadza	Labour
2024–present	Sam Allen	Labour

== Southend-on-Sea council elections since 2001 ==
There was a revision of ward boundaries in Southend-on-Sea in 2001. Milton lost some territory between Queensway and Southchurch Avenue to the new ward of Kursaal. All seats were up for election in 2001. The subsequent election cycle for the first Milton seat was 2002, 2006, 2010, 2014, 2018 and 2022. The cycle for the second seat was 2003, 2007, 2011, 2015, 2019 and 2023. The cycle for the third seat was 2004, 2008, 2012, 2016, 2021 and 2024.

=== 2024 election ===
The election took place on 2 May 2024.

2024 Southend-on-Sea City Council election: Milton
Party	Candidate	Votes	%	±%
Labour	Sam Allen	1,170	52.1	+1.0
Conservative	Jonathan Garston	540	24.0	–0.2
Green	Sarah-Ann Patel	269	12.0	+2.0
Heritage	Bianca Isherwood	106	4.7	±0.0
Liberal Democrats	Robert Howes	84	3.7	–2.7
Confelicity	Dee Curtis	68	3.0	–0.7
Majority		630	28.1	+1.2
Turnout		2,246	27.0	–0.6
Labour hold		Swing	▲0.6	

=== 2023 election ===
The election took place on 4 May 2023.

2023 Southend-on-Sea City Council election: Milton
Party	Candidate	Votes	%	±%
Labour	Cheryl Nevin	1,137	51.1	–2.9
Conservative	Marco Mann	538	24.2	–4.0
Green	Sarah-Ann Patel	222	10.0	±0.0
Liberal Democrats	Robert Howes	143	6.4	+1.4
Heritage	Bianca Isherwood	105	4.7	N/A
Confelicity	Dee Curtis	82	3.7	+1.0
Majority		599	26.9	+1.1
Turnout		2,236	27.6	
Registered electors		8,104		
Labour hold		Swing	▲0.6	

=== 2022 election ===
The election took place on 4 May 2022.

2022 Southend-on-Sea Borough Council election: Milton
Party	Candidate	Votes	%	±%
Labour	Maxine Sadza	1,257	54.0	+4.0
Conservative	Keaton Harland	657	28.2	−5.4
Green	Sarah-Ann Patel	233	10.0	−2.2
Liberal Democrats	Charlotte Kurilecz	116	5.0	+0.8
Confelicity	Dee Curtis	63	2.7	N/A
Majority		600	25.8	
Turnout		2,326		
Labour hold		Swing	▲4.7	

=== 2021 election ===
The election took place on 6 May 2021.

2021 Southend-on-Sea Borough Council election: Milton
Party	Candidate	Votes	%	±%
Labour	Stephen George	1,306	50.0	+0.9
Conservative	John Harland	877	33.6	+5.3
Green	Sarah-Ann Patel	319	12.2	−0.5
Liberal Democrats	Robert Howes	111	4.2	−5.7
Majority		429	16.4	
Turnout		2,613	32.2	
Labour hold		Swing		

=== 2019 election ===
The election took place on 2 May 2019.

2019 Southend-on-Sea Borough Council election: Milton
Party	Candidate	Votes	%	±%
Labour	Kay Mitchell	1,101	49.1	▼0.8
Conservative	Jonathan Garston	634	28.3	▼3.3
Green	Vida Guildford	285	12.7	▲7.0
Liberal Democrats	Carol White	223	9.9	▼3.2
Majority		467	20.8	▲2.5
Turnout		2,243	27.7	▲7.1
Labour gain from Conservative		Swing	▲1.3	

Green party candidate compared to 2018 election. No For Britain (-5.3) as previous.

=== 2019 by-election ===
The by-election took place on 21 March 2019, following the death of Julian Ware-Lane.

2019 Milton by-election
Party	Candidate	Votes	%	±%
Labour	Stephen George	833	49.9	▼0.8
Conservative	Garry Lowen	528	31.6	▼0.6
Liberal Democrats	Carol White	219	13.1	▲8.6
For Britain	James Quail	89	5.3	New
Majority		305	18.3	▼0.1
Turnout		1,669	20.6	▼10.9
Labour hold		Swing	▼2.2	

=== 2018 election ===
The election took place on 3 May 2018.

2018 Southend-on-Sea Borough Council election: Milton
Party	Candidate	Votes	%	±%
Labour	Cheryl Nevin	1,305	50.7	▲5.4
Conservative	Garry Lowen	832	32.2	▲5.9
Independent	Stephen Cummins	177	6.9	▲1.4
Green	Vida Guilford	146	5.7	▼0.6
Liberal Democrats	Bob Howes	116	4.5	▲1.0
Majority		473	18.4	—
Turnout		2,576	31.5	—
Labour hold		Swing	▼0.3	

=== 2016 election ===
The election took place on 5 May 2016.

2016 Southend-on-Sea Borough Council election: Milton
Party	Candidate	Votes	%	±%
Labour	Julian Ware-Lane	1,020	45.3	+7.5
Conservative	Daniel Nelson	593	26.3	−12.7
UKIP	Jo Googe	297	13.2	N/A
Green	Stephen Bartram	142	6.3	−4.6
Independent	Stephen Cummins	124	5.5	−1.2
Liberal Democrats	Robert Howes	78	3.5	+2.1
Majority				
Turnout			30.47	
Labour hold		Swing		

=== 2015 election ===
The election took place on 7 May 2015.

2015 Southend-on-Sea Borough Council election: Milton
Party	Candidate	Votes	%	±%
Conservative	Jonathan Garston	1,709	39.0	
Labour	Gary Sergeant	1,658	37.8	
Green	Vida Mansfield	476	10.9	
Independent	Tammy Cooper	295	6.7	
Liberal Democrats	Robert Howes	247	5.6	
Majority				
Turnout				
Conservative hold		Swing		

=== 2014 election ===
The election took place on 22 May 2014.

2014 Southend-on-Sea Borough Council election: Milton
Party	Candidate	Votes	%	±%
Labour	Cheryl Nevin	848	36.4	+0.6
Conservative	Vic Lee	582	25.0	–7.2
UKIP	Edward McNally	486	20.8	New
Independent	Mark Sharp	259	11.1	New
Liberal Democrats	Bob Howes	156	6.7	+0.2
Majority				
Turnout		2,352	30.25	
Labour gain from Conservative		Swing		

=== 2012 election ===
The election took place on 3 May 2012.

2012 Southend-on-Sea Borough Council election: Milton
Party	Candidate	Votes	%	±%
Labour	Julian Ware-Lane	675	35.8	
Conservative	Nigel Folkard	607	32.2	
Independent	Christine Hills	361	19.1	
Liberal Democrats	Colin Davis	123	6.5	
English Democrat	Spencer Haggar	122	6.5	
Majority				
Turnout		1,898	24.40	
Labour gain from Conservative		Swing		

=== 2011 election ===
The election took place on 5 May 2011.

2011 Southend-on-Sea Borough Council election: Milton
Party	Candidate	Votes	%	±%
Conservative	Jonathan Garston	998	40.5	
Labour	Julian Ware-Lane	800	32.5	
Independent	Christine Hills	446	18.1	
Liberal Democrats	Mark Cohen	221	9.0	
Majority				
Turnout				
Conservative hold		Swing		

=== 2010 election ===
The election took place on 6 May 2010.

2010 Southend-on-Sea Borough Council election: Milton
Party	Candidate	Votes	%	±%
Conservative	Maria Caunce	1,502	38.2	–9.7
Labour	Simon Morley	905	23.0	–2.9
Liberal Democrats	Bob Howes	901	22.9	+6.3
Independent	Julian Lowes	243	6.2	New
UKIP	Wayne Mearns	207	5.3	New
BNP	Stanley Adie	171	4.4	–5.2
Majority				
Turnout				
Conservative hold		Swing		

=== 2008 election ===
The election took place on 1 May 2008.

2008 Southend-on-Sea Borough Council election: Milton
Party	Candidate	Votes	%	±%
Conservative	Nigel Folkard	928	47.9	+3.6
Labour	Tony Borton	502	25.9	−2.1
Liberal Democrats	Justine Farenden	321	16.6	+6.7
BNP	Derek King	185	9.6	+9.6
Majority		426	22.0	+5.6
Turnout		1,936	28.1	+1.6
Conservative hold		Swing		

=== 2007 election ===
The election took place on 3 May 2007.

2007 Southend-on-Sea Borough Council election: Milton
Party	Candidate	Votes	%	±%
Conservative	Jonathan Garston	837	44.3	+4.3
Labour	Clive Rebbeck	528	28.0	+6.9
Liberal Democrats	Paul Collins	187	9.9	−3.3
Independent	John Bacon	134	7.1	−8.5
Green	Stephen Jordan	125	6.6	−3.6
Independent	David Aitken	77	4.1	+4.1
Majority		309	16.4	−2.5
Turnout		1,888	26.5	−3.5
Conservative hold		Swing		

=== 2006 election ===
The election took place on 4 May 2006.

2006 Southend-on-Sea Borough Council election: Milton
Party	Candidate	Votes	%	±%
Conservative	Ann Robertson	818	40.0	−11.2
Labour	Reginald Copley	431	21.1	−6.5
Alliance Southend	John Bacon	318	15.6	+15.6
Liberal Democrats	Paul Collins	269	13.2	−8.0
Green	Stephen Jordan	208	10.2	+10.2
Majority		387	18.9	−4.7
Turnout		2,044	30.0	−0.9
Conservative hold		Swing		

=== 2004 election ===
The election took place on 10 June 2004.

2004 Southend-on-Sea Borough Council election: Milton
Party	Candidate	Votes	%	±%
Conservative	Raymond Davy	1,068	51.2	−0.9
Labour	Ian Gilbert	576	27.6	+0.9
Liberal Democrats	Marion Boulton	441	21.2	+7.9
Majority		492	23.6	−1.7
Turnout		2,085	30.9	+8.7
Conservative hold		Swing		

=== 2003 election ===
The election took place on 1 May 2003.

2003 Southend-on-Sea Borough Council election: Milton
Party	Candidate	Votes	%	±%
Conservative	Jonathan Garston	785	52.1	−2.2
Labour	Ian Gilbert	403	26.7	−8.0
Liberal Democrats	Michael Clark	201	13.3	+13.3
Green	Steve Flynn	118	7.8	−3.2
Majority		382	25.3	+5.6
Turnout		1,507	22.2	−5.3
Conservative hold		Swing		

=== 2002 election ===
The election took place on 2 May 2002.

2002 Southend-on-Sea Borough Council election: Milton
Party	Candidate	Votes	%	±%
Conservative	Ann Robertson	1,069	54.3	
Labour	Lilias Felton	682	34.7	
Green	William Ferrett	216	11.0	
Majority		387	19.7	
Turnout		1,967	27.5	−19.9
Conservative hold		Swing		

=== 2001 election ===
The election took place on 7 June 2001.

2001 Southend-on-Sea Borough Council election: Milton
Party	Candidate	Votes	%	±%
Conservative	Raymond Davy	1,355		
Conservative	Jonathan Garston	1,344		
Conservative	Ann Robertson	1,310		
Labour	William Chesworth	1,285		
Labour	Lilias Felton	1,214		
Labour	Maureen Shaw	1,192		
Liberal Democrats	Amanda Spraggs	490		
Liberal Democrats	Richard Wiggins	466		
Turnout		8,656	47.4	
Conservative win (new boundaries)				
Conservative win (new boundaries)				
Conservative win (new boundaries)				

== 1997–2001 Southend-on-Sea council elections ==
Milton ward boundaries from 1976 to 2001

The electoral cycle was restarted on 1 May 1997 without change of ward boundaries, to coincide with Southend-on-Sea Borough Council becoming a unitary authority on 1 April 1998. All seats were up for election in 1997.

=== 2000 election ===
The election took place on 4 May 2000.

2000 Southend-on-Sea Borough Council election: Milton
Party	Candidate	Votes	%	±%
Conservative	Jonathan Garston	1,096	50.4	
Labour	Stephen George	782	36.0	
Liberal Democrats	Amanda Smith	150	6.9	
Cliffs Pavilion Area Residents' Parking	Patricia Clark	146	6.7	
Majority		314	14.4	
Turnout		2,174	25.2	+1.3
Conservative gain from Labour		Swing		

=== 1999 election ===
The election took place on 6 May 1999.

1999 Southend-on-Sea Borough Council election: Milton
Party	Candidate	Votes	%	±%
Labour	Lilias Felton	934		
Labour	Stephen George	913		
Conservative	Joyce Lambert	912		
Conservative	Ahmad Khwaja	829		
Liberal Democrats	Robert Howes	198		
Liberal Democrats	Amanda Smith	191		
Turnout		3,977	23.9	
Labour hold		Swing		
Labour gain from Conservative		Swing		

=== 1997 election ===
The election took place on 1 May 1997.

1997 Southend-on-Sea Borough Council election: Milton
Party	Candidate	Votes	%	±%
Conservative	R. Davy	1,753	39.5	
Labour	K. Lee	1,751	39.4	
Conservative	J. Lambert	1,747		
Labour	P. Hawkins	1,725		
Labour	L. Felton	1,678		
Conservative	A. Khwaja	1,503		
Liberal Democrats	J. Overy	937	21.1	
Liberal Democrats	L. Smith	843		
Liberal Democrats	T. Ray	819		
Turnout			52.6	
Conservative gain from Labour				
Labour hold				
Conservative gain from Labour				

== 1976–1997 Southend-on-Sea council elections ==
There was a revision of ward boundaries in Southend-on-Sea in 1976.

=== 1996 election ===
The election took place on 2 May 1996.

1996 Southend-on-Sea Borough Council election: Milton
Party	Candidate	Votes	%	±%
Labour	L. Felton	1,271	54.7	
Conservative	R. Davy	798	34.3	
Liberal Democrats	W. Petchey	256	11.0	
Majority			20.4	
Turnout			25.5	
Labour gain from Conservative		Swing		

=== 1995 election ===
The election took place on 4 May 1995.

1995 Southend-on-Sea Borough Council election: Milton
Party	Candidate	Votes	%	±%
Labour	P. Hawkins	1,508	54.1	
Conservative	J. Carlile	1,012	36.3	
Liberal Democrats	W. Petchey	269	9.6	
Majority			17.8	
Turnout			31.0	
Labour gain from Conservative		Swing		

=== 1994 election ===
The election took place on 5 May 1994.

1994 Southend-on-Sea Borough Council election: Milton
Party	Candidate	Votes	%	±%
Labour	K. Lee	1,232	42.9	
Conservative	K. Cater	1,102	38.4	
Liberal Democrats	W. Petchey	535	18.6	
Majority			4.5	
Turnout			35.3	
Labour gain from Conservative		Swing		

=== 1992 election ===
The election took place on 7 May 1992.

1992 Southend-on-Sea Borough Council election: Milton
Party	Candidate	Votes	%	±%
Conservative	G. Baum	1,400	58.5	
Labour	K. Lee	516	21.6	
Liberal Democrats	S. Hall	447	18.7	
SDP	M. Sarfas	31	1.3	
Majority			2.9	
Turnout			46.1	
Conservative hold		Swing		

=== 1991 election ===
The election took place on 2 May 1991.

1991 Southend-on-Sea Borough Council election: Milton
Party	Candidate	Votes	%	±%
Conservative	J. Carlile	1,403	50.3	
Labour	K. Lee	826	29.6	
Liberal Democrats	J. Kaufman	244	8.7	
Independent	J. Adams	166	6.0	
Liberal	T. Marshall	150	5.4	
Majority			20.7	
Turnout			37.3	
Conservative hold		Swing		
