= 2015 Southend-on-Sea Borough Council election =

2015 UK local government election

2015 Southend-on-Sea Borough Council
← 2014	7 May 2015	2016 →

19 out of 51 seats to Southend-on-Sea Borough Council 26 seats needed for a majority
- Turnout: 62.2%
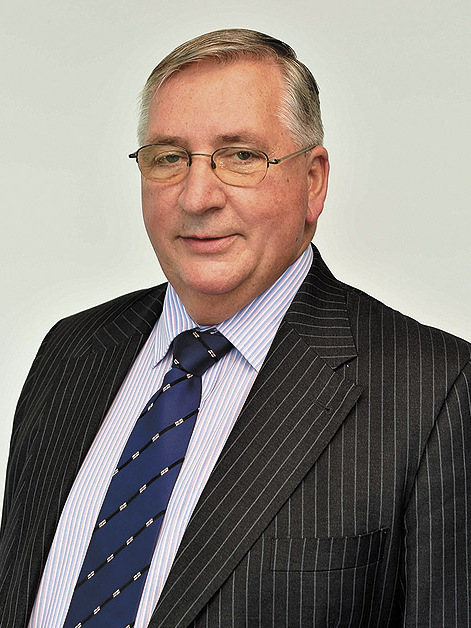

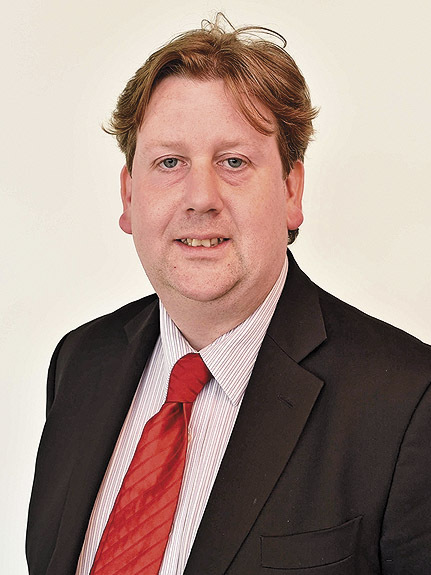

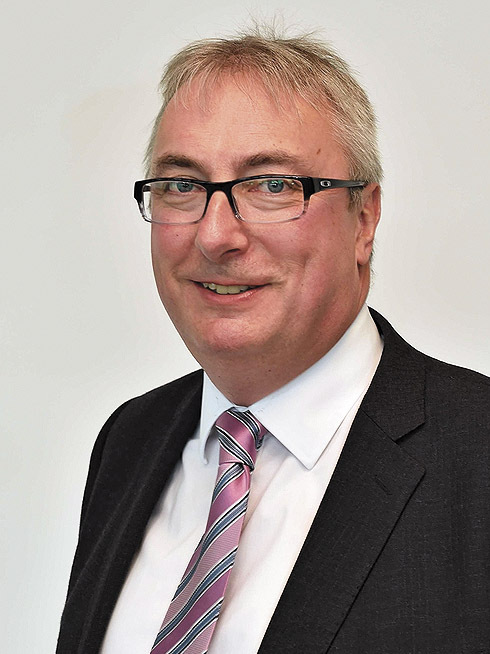

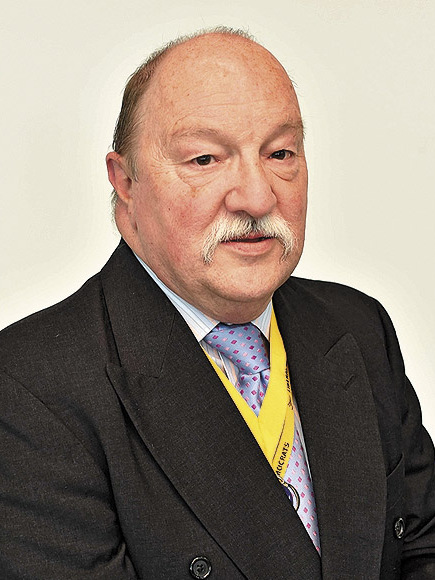
	First party	Second party	Third party
		Ind
Leader	John Lamb	n/a	Ian Gilbert
Party	Conservative	Independent	Labour
Leader since	25 May 2014	n/a	Oct/Nov 2010
Leader's seat	West Leigh	n/a	Victoria
Last election	19 seats, 30.9%	13 seats, 18.2%	9 seats, 18.1%
Seats before	19	13	9
Seats won	13	2	3
Seats after	22	11	9
Seat change	▲3	▼2	Steady
Popular vote	34,725	12,679	16,963
Percentage	39.3%	14.3%	19.2%
Swing	▲8.4%	▼3.9%	▲1.1%
	Fourth party	Fifth party	Sixth party
			Green
Leader	James Moyies	Graham Longley	n/a
Party	UKIP	Liberal Democrats	Green
Leader since	May 2014		n/a
Leader's seat	West Shoebury	Blenheim Park	n/a
Last election	5 seats, 18.8%	5 seats, 12.6%	0 seats, 1.3%
Seats before	5	5	0
Seats won	1	0	0
Seats after	5	4	0
Seat change	Steady	▼1	Steady
Popular vote	9,023	8,796	6,181
Percentage	10.2%	10.0%	7.0%
Swing	▼8.6%	▼2.6%	▲5.7%
- Results of the 2015 Southend-on-Sea Borough Council election
Leader before election
Ron Woodley
Independent
No overall control
Leader after election
Ron Woodley
Independent
No overall control

The 2015 Southend-on-Sea Borough Council election took place on 7 May 2015 to elect members of Southend-on-Sea Borough Council in England. This was on the same day as the 2015 general election and other local elections.

== Summary ==
=== Election result ===
2015 Southend-on-Sea Borough Council election
Party	This election			Full council			This election		
Party	Seats	Net	Seats %	Other	Total	Total %	Votes	Votes %	+/−
Conservative	13	▲3	68.4	9	22	43.1	34,725	39.3	+8.4
Independent	2	▼2	10.5	8	11	21.6	12,679	14.3	–3.9
Labour	3	▲1	15.8	7	9	19.6	16,963	19.2	+1.1
UKIP	1	Steady	5.3	4	5	9.8	9,023	10.2	–8.6
Liberal Democrats	0	▼2	0.0	4	4	5.9	8,796	10.0	–2.6
Green	0	Steady	0.0	0	0	0.0	6,181	7.0	+5.7

== Ward results ==
Incumbent councillors standing for re-election are marked with an asterisk (*). Changes in seats do not take into account interim by-elections or defections.

=== Belfairs ===
Belfairs
Party	Candidate	Votes	%	±%
Conservative	Lesley Salter*	2,204	42.6	–2.1
UKIP	David Dearle	1,166	22.5	N/A
Labour	Dave Alston	641	12.4	–0.6
Independent	Stephen McKiernan	495	9.6	–25.4
Liberal Democrats	Mike Grimwade	410	7.9	+0.6
Green	Barry Bolton	263	5.1	N/A
Majority		1,038	20.1	+10.4
Turnout		5,179	69.3	+31.9
Conservative hold				

=== Blenheim Park ===
Blenheim Park
Party	Candidate	Votes	%	±%
Conservative	James Courtenay*	1,930	37.8	+10.7
UKIP	Paul Lloyd	1,143	22.4	–9.3
Labour	Matthew Dent	947	18.6	+4.3
Liberal Democrats	Richard Herbert	698	13.7	–6.0
Green	Jimmy Wild	386	7.6	+0.4
Majority		787	15.4	N/A
Turnout		5,104	64.1	+30.4
Conservative hold		Swing	▲10.0	

=== Chalkwell ===
Chalkwell
Party	Candidate	Votes	%	±%
Conservative	Stephen Habermel*	2,266	49.4	+12.1
Labour	Lars Davidsson	895	19.5	+2.0
Independent	Lucy Courtenay	737	16.1	–4.4
Green	Peter Walker	381	8.3	N/A
Liberal Democrats	Jessie Skinner	304	6.6	–0.3
Majority		1,371	29.9	+13.1
Turnout		4,583	64.2	+33.3
Conservative hold		Swing	▲5.1	

=== Eastwood Park ===
Eastwood Park
Party	Candidate	Votes	%	±%
Conservative	Trevor Byford*	2,862	57.9	+16.1
Liberal Democrats	Paul Collins	952	19.3	+5.4
Labour	Martin Berry	732	14.8	+5.1
Green	Fiddian Warman	398	8.1	N/A
Majority		1,910	38.6	+31.4
Turnout		4,944	66.3	+30.5
Conservative hold		Swing	▲5.4	

=== Kursaal ===
Kursaal
Party	Candidate	Votes	%	±%
Labour	Judith McMahon*	1,367	36.5	+5.0
Conservative	Alex Bright	951	25.4	+4.9
UKIP	Verina Weaver	898	24.0	–9.5
Green	Simon Cross	358	9.6	+0.3
Liberal Democrats	Richard Betson	171	4.6	–0.6
Majority		416	11.1	N/A
Turnout		3,745	48.3	+25.2
Labour hold		Swing	▲0.1	

=== Leigh ===
Leigh
Party	Candidate	Votes	%	±%
Conservative	Bernard Arscott	2,167	41.5	+4.0
Liberal Democrats	Peter Wexham*	1,672	32.0	–12.7
Labour	Chris McGurk	782	15.0	–2.9
Green	Jon Mullett	602	11.5	N/A
Majority		495	9.6	N/A
Turnout		5,223	69.5	+36.8
Conservative gain from Liberal Democrats		Swing	▲8.4	

=== Milton ===
Milton
Party	Candidate	Votes	%	±%
Conservative	Jonathan Garston*	1,709	39.0	+14.0
Labour	Gary Sergeant	1,658	37.8	+1.4
Green	Vida Mansfield	476	10.9	N/A
Independent	Tammy Cooper	295	6.7	N/A
Liberal Democrats	Robert Howes	247	5.6	–1.1
Majority		51	1.2	N/A
Turnout		4,385	57.9	+27.6
Conservative hold		Swing	▲6.3	

=== Prittlewell ===
Prittlewell
Party	Candidate	Votes	%	±%
Conservative	Meg Davidson	2,325	46.3	+16.2
Labour	Tony Borton	976	19.4	+4.9
Independent	Paul Ryder	738	14.7	N/A
Liberal Democrats	Colin Davis	542	10.8	–10.3
Green	Andy Beale	441	8.8	N/A
Majority		1,349	26.9	N/A
Turnout		5,022	65.1	+29.3
Conservative gain from Liberal Democrats		Swing	▲5.7	

=== St. Laurence ===
St. Laurence (2 seats due to by-election)
Party	Candidate	Votes	%	±%
Conservative	Steve Buckley	1,911	47.9	+19.7
UKIP	David McGlone	1,387	34.8	–2.6
Conservative	David Burzotta	1,356	34.0	+5.8
Labour	Reg Copley	748	18.8	+3.5
Labour	Sean Jones	699	17.5	+2.2
Liberal Democrats	Ted Lewin	642	16.1	–3.0
Liberal Democrats	Carole Roast	624	15.6	–3.5
Green	Tanya Rayment	284	7.1	N/A
Green	Denis Walker	177	4.4	N/A
Independent	Carl Whitwell	150	3.8	N/A
Turnout			61.7	+30.4
Conservative hold				
UKIP hold				

=== St. Luke's ===
St. Luke's
Party	Candidate	Votes	%	±%
Independent	Paul van Looy*	1,531	32.6	–6.0
Conservative	Val Jarvis	979	20.9	–1.4
UKIP	Roger Weaver	880	18.8	N/A
Labour	Jes Phillips	817	17.4	–9.1
Green	Stephen Jordan	227	4.8	N/A
Liberal Democrats	Nora Goodman	139	3.0	+0.2
Independent	ABC	119	2.5	–7.3
Majority		552	11.7	–0.4
Turnout		4,692	58.7	+28.0
Independent hold		Swing	▼2.3	

=== Shoeburyness ===
Shoeburyness
Party	Candidate	Votes	%	±%
Conservative	Roger Hadley	1,991	38.8	+4.3
Independent	Anne Chalk*	1,783	34.8	–12.4
Labour	Maggie Kelly	929	18.1	+2.8
Green	Susan Smith	289	5.6	N/A
Liberal Democrats	Norman Redican	138	2.7	–0.2
Majority		208	4.0	N/A
Turnout		5,130	59.9	+29.2
Conservative gain from Independent		Swing	▲8.4	

=== Southchurch ===
Southchurch
Party	Candidate	Votes	%	±%
Conservative	Ann Holland*	1,872	38.6	–0.2
Independent	Keith Sharman	1,117	23.0	–21.2
UKIP	Barrie Page	817	16.8	N/A
Labour	Ros Sanders	719	14.8	+1.1
Green	Julian Esposito	209	4.3	N/A
Liberal Democrats	Roger Fisher	121	2.5	–0.8
Majority		755	15.6	N/A
Turnout		4,855	63.9	+29.2
Conservative hold		Swing	▲10.5	

=== Thorpe ===
Thorpe
Party	Candidate	Votes	%	±%
Independent	Ron Woodley*	3,260	59.8	–9.8
Conservative	Jon Bacon	1,435	26.3	+4.0
Labour	Rob Birks	396	7.3	+1.4
Green	Liz Swanson	227	4.2	N/A
Liberal Democrats	Jim Clinkscales	132	2.4	+0.1
Majority		1,825	33.5	–13.8
Turnout		5,450	72.5	+27.1
Independent hold		Swing	▼6.9	

=== Victoria ===
Victoria
Party	Candidate	Votes	%	±%
Labour	David Norman*	1,503	40.7	+1.2
Conservative	Denis Garne	868	23.5	+7.6
UKIP	Peter Breuer	831	22.5	–7.9
Green	Ian Hurd	332	9.0	–0.5
Liberal Democrats	Donna Collins	155	4.2	+0.3
Majority		635	17.2	+8.1
Turnout		3,689	50.3	+23.5
Labour hold		Swing	▼3.2	

=== West Leigh ===
West Leigh
Party	Candidate	Votes	%	±%
Conservative	Georgina Phillips	2,893	52.1	+11.5
Liberal Democrats	Chris Bailey	1,086	19.6	–9.0
UKIP	David Standfield	776	14.0	–7.9
Labour	Jay Woods	531	9.6	+0.8
Green	Sarah Yapp	265	4.8	N/A
Majority		1,807	32.5	+20.5
Turnout		5,551	78.0	+37.5
Conservative hold		Swing	▲12.3	

=== West Shoebury ===
West Shoebury (2 seats due to by-election)
Party	Candidate	Votes	%	±%
Conservative	Tony Cox	1,999	47.0	+12.2
Conservative	Derek Jarvis*	1,734	40.7	+5.9
UKIP	Eddie McNally	1,125	26.4	–19.6
Independent	Alex Moyies	875	20.6	N/A
Independent	Margaret Haydon	816	19.2	N/A
Labour	David Carrington	656	15.4	+2.1
Labour	Matt Zarb-Cousin	529	12.4	–0.9
Green	Nigel Outten	360	8.5	N/A
Liberal Democrats	Charlie Row	249	5.8	–0.1
Liberal Democrats	David Betson	170	4.0	–1.9
Turnout			64.0	+29.2
Conservative hold				
Conservative hold				

=== Westborough ===
Westborough
Party	Candidate	Votes	%	±%
Labour	Charles Willis	1,438	33.3	+0.1
Conservative	Daryl Peagram	1,273	29.4	+12.7
Independent	David Webb	587	13.6	N/A
Green	Paul Mansfield	506	11.7	N/A
Liberal Democrats	David Barrett	344	8.0	–10.5
Independent	Alan Hart	176	4.1	–4.7
Majority		165	3.9	N/A
Turnout		4,324	56.0	+26.8
Labour gain from Independent		Swing	▼6.3	
