= Kursaal (ward) =

British political subdivision

- Electoral ward for the Southend-on-Sea City Council
- Kursaal ward boundaries
- District: Southend-on-Sea
- County: Essex
- Population: 12,092 (2021)
- Area: 1.256 square kilometres (0.485 sq mi)

Current electoral ward
- Created: 2001
- Number of members: 3
- Councillors: Matt Dent; Irene Ferguson; Chris Webster
- Created from: Milton, St Lukes, Thorpe
- ONS code: 00KFMT
- GSS code: E05002216

Kursaal is an electoral ward of Southend-on-Sea. It was first used at the 2001 elections. The ward returns three councillors to Southend-on-Sea City Council.

== List of councillors ==
Term	Councillor	Party
2001–2010; 2011–2019	Judith Mcmahon (Note: Judith Mcmahon changed parties in 2017)	Labour
2001–2010; 2011–2019	Judith Mcmahon	Conservative
2001–2011	Stephen George	Labour
2001–2008	Denis Garne	Labour
2008–2012	Blaine Robin	Conservative
2010–2014	Louise Burdett	Conservative
2012–2016	Ann Jones	Labour
2014–2018	Lawrence Davies	UKIP
2016–2021	Helen Mcdonald	Labour
2018–present	Matt Dent	Labour
2019–2023	Maggie Kelly	Labour
2021–2024	Tricia Cowdrey	Labour
2023–2024	Gabriel Leroy	Labour
2024–present	Irene Ferguson	Labour
2024–present	Chris Webster	Labour

== Summary ==
Councillors elected by party at each regular election.

- Labour
- Conservative
- UKIP

== Southend-on-Sea council elections ==
There was a revision of ward boundaries in Southend-on-Sea in 2001 with all seats up for election that year. The subsequent election cycle for the first Kursaal seat was 2002, 2006, 2010, 2014, 2018 and 2022. The cycle for the second seat was 2003, 2007, 2011, 2015, 2019 and 2023. The cycle for the third seat was 2004, 2008, 2012, 2016, 2021 and 2024.

=== 2024 by-election ===
The by-election took place on 4 July 2024, following the resignation of Gabriel Leroy.

2024 Kursaal by-election
Party	Candidate	Votes	%	±%
Labour	Chris Webster	1,718	49.1	–1.9
Conservative	Marco Mann	651	18.6	+4.3
Green	Thomas Love	411	11.7	+4.0
Independent	Kay Mitchell	407	11.6	+0.8
Liberal Democrats	Billy Boulton	198	5.7	+2.2
Heritage	Lara Hurley	115	3.3	+0.2
Majority		1,067	30.5	–6.2
Turnout		3,500	44.8	+24.0
Labour hold		Swing	▼3.1	

=== 2024 election ===
The election took place on 2 May 2024.

2024 Southend-on-Sea City Council election: Kursaal
Party	Candidate	Votes	%	±%
Labour	Irene Ferguson	846	51.0	–3.9
Conservative	Marco Mann	237	14.3	–7.2
Independent	Kay Mitchell	179	10.8	N/A
Confelicity	Lee Clark	155	9.3	+3.7
Green	Thomas Love	128	7.7	–0.6
Liberal Democrats	Alan Crystall	58	3.5	–1.5
Heritage	Lara Hurley	51	3.1	+0.9
Majority		609	36.7	+3.3
Turnout		1,660	20.8	+0.3
Labour gain from Independent		Swing	▲1.7	

=== 2023 election ===
The election took place on 4 May 2023.

2023 Southend-on-Sea City Council election: Kursaal
Party	Candidate	Votes	%	±%
Labour Co-op	Gabriel Leroy	886	54.9	–7.7
Conservative	Andrew Brookes	348	21.5	–1.8
Green	Thomas Love	134	8.3	+1.8
Confelicity	Lee Clark	90	5.6	+1.6
Liberal Democrats	Rory Windass	80	5.0	+1.4
British Democrats	Stephen Smith	42	2.6	N/A
Heritage	Lara Hurley	35	2.2	N/A
Majority		538	33.4	–5.9
Turnout		1,621	20.5	
Registered electors		7,907		
Labour Co-op hold		Swing	▼3.0	

=== 2022 election ===
The election took place on 4 May 2022.

2022 Southend-on-Sea Borough Council election: Kursaal
Party	Candidate	Votes	%	±%
Labour Co-op	Matt Dent	1,105	62.6	+15.2
Conservative	Denis Garne	411	23.3	−12.1
Green	Thomas Love	114	6.5	−6.0
Confelicity	James Miller	70	4.0	N/A
Liberal Democrats	Robert Howes	64	3.6	−1.0
Majority		694	39.3	
Turnout		1,764		
Labour Co-op hold		Swing	▲13.7	

=== 2021 election ===
The election took place on 6 May 2021.

2021 Southend-on-Sea Borough Council election: Kursaal
Party	Candidate	Votes	%	±%
Labour	Tricia Cowdrey	926	47.4	▲12.4
Conservative	Judith Mcmahon	692	35.4	▲21.2
Green	Thomas Love	245	12.5	▼6.9
Liberal Democrats	Phil Edey	90	4.6	▼12.6
Majority		234	12.0	▼3.6
Turnout		1,953	24.6	▼0.4
Labour hold		Swing	▼4.4	

=== 2019 election ===
The election took place on 2 May 2019.

2019 Southend-on-Sea Borough Council election: Kursaal
Party	Candidate	Votes	%	±%
Labour	Maggie Kelly	693	35.0	▼16.9
Green	Simon Cross	384	19.4	N/A
Liberal Democrats	Howard Gibeon	341	17.2	▼6.3
Conservative	Brian Beggs	282	14.2	▼10.5
Independent	Anthony Dillon	279	14.1	New
Majority		309	15.6	▼11.6
Turnout		1,979	25.0	▲0.6
Labour hold		Swing	▼3.2	

=== 2018 election ===
The election took place on 3 May 2018.

2018 Southend-on-Sea Borough Council election: Kursaal
Party	Candidate	Votes	%	±%
Labour	Matt Dent	1,008	51.9	▲9.8
Conservative	Dave Clift	479	24.7	▲2.2
Liberal Democrats	Howard Gibeon	456	23.5	▲19.0
Majority		529	27.2	▼7.6
Turnout		1,943	24.4	▲2.6
Labour gain from UKIP		Swing	▲3.8	

No UKIP (-19.0) or Green (-8.4) candidates as previous.

=== 2016 election ===
The election took place on 5 May 2016.

2016 Southend-on-Sea Borough Council election: Kursaal
Party	Candidate	Votes	%	±%
Labour	Helen McDonald	709	42.1	▲5.6
UKIP	Gordon Bailey-Smith	379	22.5	▼1.5
Conservative	Simon Gittus	378	22.5	▼2.9
Green	Liz Swanson	141	8.4	▼1.2
Liberal Democrats	Richard Collins	75	4.5	▼0.1
Majority		330	19.6	▲8.5
Turnout		1,682	21.7	▼26.6
Labour hold		Swing	▲4.3	

=== 2015 election ===
The election took place on 7 May 2015.

2015 Southend-on-Sea Borough Council election: Kursaal
Party	Candidate	Votes	%	±%
Labour	Judith Mcmahon	1,367	36.5	▲5.0
Conservative	Alex Bright	951	25.4	▲4.9
UKIP	Verina Weaver	898	24.0	▼9.5
Green	Simon Cross	358	9.6	▲0.3
Liberal Democrats	Richard Betson	171	4.6	▼0.6
Majority		416	11.1	
Turnout		3,745	48.3	▲25.2
Labour hold		Swing	▲0.1	

=== 2014 election ===
The election took place on 22 May 2014.

2014 Southend-on-Sea Borough Council election: Kursaal
Party	Candidate	Votes	%	±%
UKIP	Lawrence Davies	612	33.5	New
Labour	Charles Willis	576	31.5	▼7.3
Conservative	Jane Ladner	375	20.5	▼10.9
Green	Simon Cross	170	9.3	▲1.3
Liberal Democrats	Richard Betson	95	5.2	▲0.2
Majority		36	2.0	
Turnout		1,828	23.1	▲1.8
UKIP gain from Conservative		Swing		

No English Democrat candidate as previous (-16.9).

=== 2012 election ===
The election took place on 3 May 2012.

2012 Southend-on-Sea Borough Council election: Kursaal
Party	Candidate	Votes	%	±%
Labour	Anne Jones	614	38.8	▼5.7
Conservative	Blaine Robin	496	31.4	▲0.1
English Democrat	Stephen Riley	267	16.9	New
Green	Simon Cross	126	8.0	New
Liberal Democrats	Richard Betson	79	5.0	▼3.0
Majority		118	7.4	▼5.8
Turnout		1,582	21.3	▼8.2
Labour gain from Conservative		Swing	▼2.9	

=== 2011 election ===
The election took place on 5 May 2011.

2011 Southend-on-Sea Borough Council election: Kursaal
Party	Candidate	Votes	%	±%
Labour	Judith Mcmahon	969	44.5	▲15.4
Conservative	Neil Austin	681	31.3	▲1.5
UKIP	Lawrence Davies	182	8.4	▲3.5
Liberal Democrats	Richard Betson	174	8.0	▼9.1
Independent	Joseph Saunders	172	7.9	▼3.2
Majority		288	13.2	
Turnout		2,178	29.5	▼17.4
Labour hold		Swing	▲7.0	

No BNP (-6.5) Independent (-11.1) or English Democrat (-1.6) candidates as previous

=== 2010 election ===
The election took place on 6 May 2010.

2010 Southend-on-Sea Borough Council election: Kursaal
Party	Candidate	Votes	%	±%
Conservative	Louise Burdett	1,067	29.8	▼8.6
Labour	Judith Mcmahon	1,043	29.1	▼9.0
Liberal Democrats	Richard Betson	613	17.1	▲6.3
Independent	Kash Trivedi	399	11.1	New
BNP	David Armstrong	232	6.5	▼6.2
UKIP	Lawrence Davies	174	4.9	New
English Democrat	Adrian Key	57	1.6	New
Majority		24	0.7	▲0.4
Turnout		3,585	46.9	▲19.1
Conservative gain from Labour		Swing	▲0.2	

=== 2008 election ===
The election took place on 1 May 2008.

2008 Southend-on-Sea Borough Council election: Kursaal
Party	Candidate	Votes	%	±%
Conservative	Blaine Robin	747	38.4	▲8.4
Labour	Denis Garne	741	38.1	▼1.8
BNP	David Armstrong	246	12.7	▼2.6
Liberal Democrats	Howard Gibeon	210	10.8	▼4.0
Majority		6	0.3	
Turnout		1,944	27.8	▲2.9
Conservative gain from Labour		Swing	▲5.1	

=== 2007 election ===
The election took place on 3 May 2007.

2007 Southend-on-Sea Borough Council election: Kursaal
Party	Candidate	Votes	%	±%
Labour	Stephen George	715	39.9	▲4.6
Conservative	Blaine Robin	538	30.0	▲1.6
BNP	Dean Fenner	276	15.4	▼5.8
Liberal Democrats	Matthew Cartwright	264	14.8	▼0.3
Majority		177	9.9	▲3.0
Turnout		1,793	24.9	▼2.9
Labour hold		Swing	▲1.5	

=== 2006 election ===
The election took place on 4 May 2006.

2006 Southend-on-Sea Borough Council election: Kursaal
Party	Candidate	Votes	%	±%
Labour	Judith Mcmahon	650	35.3	▲0.8
Conservative	Blaine Robin	522	28.4	▼5.8
BNP	Dean Fenner	391	21.2	New
Liberal Democrats	Jennifer Wexham	278	15.1	▲3.9
Majority		128	6.9	
Turnout		1,841	27.8	▲3.3
Labour hold		Swing	▲1.0	

=== 2004 election ===
The election took place on 10 June 2004.

2004 Southend-on-Sea Borough Council election: Kursaal
Party	Candidate	Votes	%	±%
Labour	Denis Garne	627	34.5	▼17.0
Conservative	Tony Cox	623	34.2	▲3.6
English Democrat	Adrian Key	225	12.4	New
Liberal Democrats	Robert Howes	203	11.2	▼6.7
Green	Paul Circus	142	7.8	New
Majority		4	0.2	▼20.7
Turnout		1,820	26.8	▲8.3
Labour hold		Swing	▼10.3	

=== 2003 election ===
The election took place on 1 May 2003.

2003 Southend-on-Sea Borough Council election: Kursaal
Party	Candidate	Votes	%	±%
Labour	Stephen George	644	51.5	▲1.8
Conservative	Judith Smithson	383	30.6	▼4.5
Liberal Democrats	George Lewin	203	17.9	▲2.7
Majority		261	20.9	▲6.3
Turnout		1,230	18.5	▼0.4
Labour hold		Swing	▲3.2	

=== 2002 election ===
The election took place on 2 May 2002.

2002 Southend-on-Sea Borough Council election: Kursaal
Party	Candidate	Votes	%	±%
Labour	Judith Mcmahon	648	49.7	N/A
Conservative	Judith Smithson	458	35.1	N/A
Liberal Democrats	Linda Smith	199	15.2	N/A
Majority		190	14.6	N/A
Turnout		1,305	18.9	N/A
Labour hold		Swing		

=== 2001 election ===
The election took place on 7 June 2001.

2001 Southend-on-Sea Borough Council election: Kursaal
Party	Candidate	Votes	%	±%
Labour	Denis Garne	1,349		
Labour	Stephen George	1,303		
Labour	Judith McMahon	1,295		
Conservative	Graham John	958		
Conservative	Leslie Judd	860		
Conservative	Judith Smithson	838		
Liberal Democrats	Rose Day	435		
Liberal Democrats	Christine Read	421		
Turnout		7,460	42.2	
Labour win (new seat)				
Labour win (new seat)				
Labour win (new seat)				
