= 2021 Southend-on-Sea Borough Council election =

2021 UK local government election

2021 Southend-on-Sea Borough Council
- 6 May 2021

17 out of 51 seats to Southend-on-Sea Borough Council 26 seats needed for a majority
- Turnout: ?
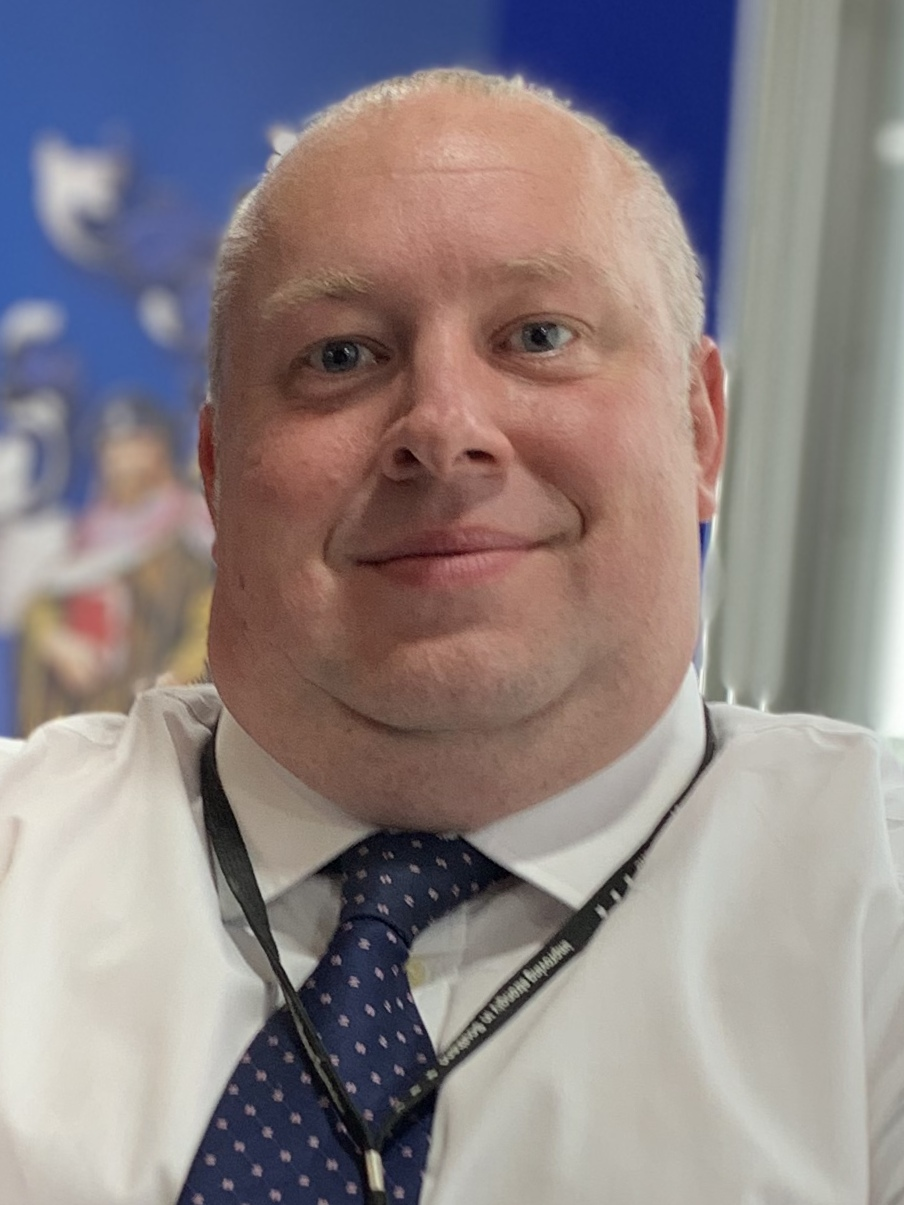

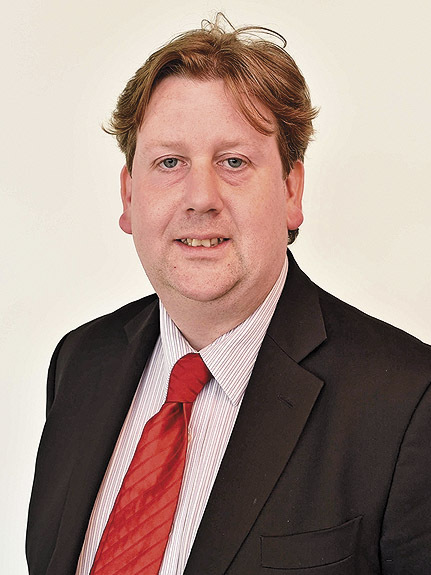

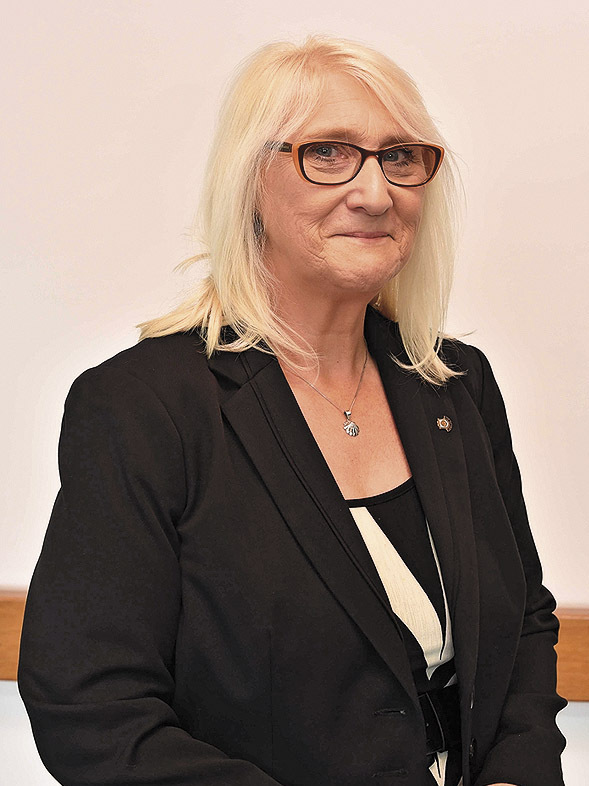
	First party	Second party	Third party
			Ind
Leader	Tony Cox	Ian Gilbert	n/a
Party	Conservative	Labour	Independent
Leader since	9 May 2019	Oct/Nov 2010	n/a
Leader's seat	West Shoebury	Victoria	n/a
Last election	20 seats, 27.0%	14 seats, 20.8%	12 seats, 24.2%
Seats before	20	12	14
Seats won	11	6	1
Seats after	23	13	10
Seat change	▲3	▲1	▼2
Popular vote	19,569	12,613	6,299
Percentage	40.5%	26.1%	13.0%
Swing	▲13.5%	▲5.3%	▼11.2%
	Fourth party	Fifth party
		Green
Leader	Carole Mulroney	n/a
Party	Liberal Democrats	Green
Leader since	May 2017	n/a
Leader's seat	Leigh	n/a
Last election	5 seats, 14.1%	0 seats, 7.5%
Seats before	5	0
Seats won	1	0
Seats after	5	0
Seat change	Steady	Steady
Popular vote	5,493	3,918
Percentage	11.4%	8.1%
Swing	▼2.7%	▲0.6%
- Map showing the results of the 2021 Southend-on-Sea Borough Council election
Leader before election
Ian Gilbert
Labour
No overall control
Leader after election
Ian Gilbert
Labour
No overall control

Elections to Southend-on-Sea Borough Council took place on 6 May 2021. This was on the same day as other local elections across the United Kingdom. The results saw the Conservatives and Labour pick up seats at the expense of the local Independents.

The council is elected by thirds, so a single member was elected from all 17 wards to a term of four years. The seats elected at this election were last contested in 2016, however due to the COVID-19 pandemic the 2020 elections were delayed for 12 months.

The "rainbow coalition" between Labour, the Liberal Democrats and local independents continued in office, with Labour councillor Ian Gilbert being elected leader of the council.

== Composition ==
Directly after the 2019 election the composition of the council was:

↓
14	5	12	20
Labour	Lib Dem	Ind	Conservative

Prior to the election the composition of the council was:

↓
12	5	14	20
Labour	Lib Dem	Ind	Conservative

After the election, the composition of the council was:

↓
13	5	10	23
Labour	Lib Dem	Ind	Conservative

== Result summary ==
2021 Southend-on-Sea Borough Council election
Party	This election			Full council			This election		
Party	Seats	Net	Seats %	Other	Total	Total %	Votes	Votes %	+/−
Conservative	11	▲3	57.9	12	23	45.1	19,569	40.5	+13.5
Labour	6	▲1	29.4	8	13	27.5	12,613	26.1	+5.3
Independent	1	▼4	5.3	9	10	17.6	6,299	13.0	-11.2
Liberal Democrats	1	Steady	5.3	4	5	9.8	5,493	11.4	-2.7
Green	0	Steady	0.0	0	0	0.0	3,918	8.1	+0.6
For Britain	0	Steady	0.0	0	0	0.0	238	0.1	±0.0
Women's Equality	0	Steady	0.0	0	0	0.0	147	0.0	±0.0
Psychedelic Future	0	Steady	0.0	0	0	0.0	37	0.0	±0.0

== Results by ward ==
=== Belfairs ===
Belfairs
Party	Candidate	Votes	%	±%
Conservative	Jack Warren	1,252	43.3	+8.8
Independent	Stephen Aylen *	1,038	35.9	+4.0
Labour	Alex Small	342	11.8	+2.5
Green	Peter Walker	166	5.7	−1.6
Liberal Democrats	Sara-Jayne Boulton	96	3.3	−2.2
Majority		214	7.4	+4.8
Turnout		2,894	38.9	
Conservative gain from Independent		Swing	▲2.4	

No UKIP candidate as previous (-11.5).

=== Blenheim Park ===
Blenheim Park
Party	Candidate	Votes	%	±%
Conservative	Helen Boyd *	1,151	42.4	+15.9
Labour	Anita Forde	1,043	38.4	+9.3
Green	Abbie Sutherland	205	7.6	+1.7
Liberal Democrats	Jill Allen-King	159	5.9	+1.3
Independent	Alan Hart	155	5.7	−28.4
Majority		108	4.0	—
Turnout		2,713	33.7	
Conservative hold		Swing	▲3.3	

=== Chalkwell ===
Chalkwell
Party	Candidate	Votes	%	±%
Conservative	James Courtenay	1,219	47.5	+9.2
Labour	Sorraiya Nawaz	732	28.5	+0.9
Green	James Vessey-Miller	241	9.4	+1.5
Liberal Democrats	Christopher Hind	226	8.8	−3.9
Women's Equality	Katie Cohen	147	5.7	+4.2
Majority		487	19.0	+8.3
Turnout		2,565	35.9	
Conservative hold		Swing	▲4.2	

No Independent candidate as previous (-12.0).

=== Eastwood Park ===
Eastwood Park
Party	Candidate	Votes	%	±%
Conservative	Chris Walker *	1,379	50.8	+28.2
Liberal Democrats	Robert McMullan	1,042	38.4	−7.6
Labour	Samuel Allen	190	7.0	+1.6
Green	Reece Learmouth	104	3.8	+1.2
Majority		337	12.4	
Turnout		2,715	36.6	
Conservative hold		Swing		

=== Kursaal ===
Kursaal
Party	Candidate	Votes	%	±%
Labour Co-op	Tricia Cowdrey	926	47.4	+12.4
Conservative	Judith McMahon	692	35.4	+21.2
Green	Thomas Love	245	12.5	−6.9
Liberal Democrats	Philip Edey	90	4.6	−12.6
Majority		234	12.0	−3.6
Turnout		1,953	24.6	−0.4
Labour Co-op hold		Swing	▼4.4	

No Independent candidate as previous (-14.1).

=== Leigh ===
Leigh
Party	Candidate	Votes	%	±%
Liberal Democrats	Peter Wexham *	1,129	39.0	−1.5
Conservative	Paul Gilson	972	33.6	+6.6
Labour	Jane Norman	424	14.7	−1.2
Green	Richard Longstaff	368	12.7	+3.9
Majority		157	5.4	
Turnout		2,893	38.4	
Liberal Democrats hold		Swing		

=== Milton ===
Milton
Party	Candidate	Votes	%	±%
Labour	Stephen George *	1,306	50.0	+0.9
Conservative	John Harland	877	33.6	+5.3
Green	Sarah-Ann Patel	319	12.2	−0.5
Liberal Democrats	Robert Howes	111	4.2	−5.7
Majority		429	16.4	
Turnout		2,613	32.2	
Labour hold		Swing		

=== Prittlewell ===
Prittlewell
Party	Candidate	Votes	%	±%
Conservative	David Garston *	1,479	53.0	+12.0
Labour	Shahid Nadeem	762	27.3	+8.2
Green	Jon Mullett	224	8.0	−0.9
Liberal Democrats	Billy Boulton	200	7.2	−1.7
Independent	Alan Martin	128	4.6	New
Majority		717	25.7	
Turnout		2,793	35.4	
Conservative hold		Swing		

=== Shoeburyness ===
Shoeburyness
Party	Candidate	Votes	%	±%
Conservative	James Moyies	1,135	45.2	+13.2
Independent	Anne Chalk	777	30.9	−2.6
Labour	Sayeeka Farnaz	308	12.3	−4.4
Green	Fiona Clapperton	145	5.8	−0.2
For Britain	James Quail	58	2.3	−6.0
Independent	Timmy Allan-John	47	1.9	New
Liberal Democrats	Granville Stride	41	1.6	−1.9
Majority		358	14.3	
Turnout		2,511	29.0	
Conservative gain from Independent		Swing		

=== Southchurch ===
Southchurch
Party	Candidate	Votes	%	±%
Conservative	Alex Bright *	1,701	63.2	+30.3
Labour	Kevin Ryan	440	16.3	+2.6
Independent	Esther Brown	274	10.2	−23.9
Green	Jo Bates	205	7.6	+3.1
Liberal Democrats	Pamela Austin	73	2.7	−1.0
Majority		1,261	46.9	—
Turnout		2,693	35.9	+3.2
Conservative hold		Swing	▲13.9	

No UKIP candidate as previous (-11.1).

=== St. Laurence ===
St. Laurence
Party	Candidate	Votes	%	±%
Conservative	Steve Buckley	1,039	37.9	+14.2
Labour	Lydia Hyde	975	35.6	+9.6
Independent	Kimberley O'Connell	590	21.5	−3.1
Liberal Democrats	Jim Clinkscales	70	2.6	−8.0
Green	Oliver Thorn	68	2.5	−0.1
Majority		64	2.3	
Turnout		2,742	34.6	
Conservative hold		Swing		

=== St. Luke's ===
St. Luke's (2 seats due to by-election)
Party	Candidate	Votes	%	±%
Conservative	Brian Beggs	744	36.2	+25.5
Labour	Martin Berry	730	35.5	+13.8
Conservative	Jonathan Garston	640	31.1	+17.4
Labour	Gabriel Leroy	545	26.5	+4.8
Independent	Brian Ayling *	447	21.7	−32.9
Independent	Susan Badger	320	15.6	−39.0
Green	Tilly Hogrebe	272	13.2	+6.5
Green	Ian Hurd	137	6.7	+0.0
Independent	Paul Anthony	81	3.9	New
Liberal Democrats	Richard Collins	74	3.6	+0.3
Independent	John Anthony	69	3.4	New
Liberal Democrats	Charlotte Kurilecz	58	2.8	−0.5
Turnout		—	50.6	
Conservative gain from Independent				
Labour gain from Independent				

=== Thorpe ===
Thorpe
Party	Candidate	Votes	%	±%
Independent	Mike Stafford *	1,499	46.6	−25.8
Conservative	Azeem Raja	875	27.2	+14.9
Labour	James Miller	422	13.1	+5.5
Green	Julie Callow	228	7.1	+2.1
For Britain	Maghan Quail	129	4.0	New
Liberal Democrats	Alan Crystall	61	1.9	−0.8
Majority		624	19.4	
Turnout		3,214	43.4	
Independent hold		Swing		

=== Victoria ===
Victoria
Party	Candidate	Votes	%	±%
Labour	Ian Gilbert *	1,114	57.1	+6.9
Conservative	Darryl Jones	554	28.4	+12.0
Green	Denis Champion-Walker	190	9.7	−3.0
Liberal Democrats	Gavin Spencer	94	4.8	−0.9
Majority		560	28.7	
Turnout		1,952	22.3	
Labour hold		Swing		

=== West Leigh ===
West Leigh
Party	Candidate	Votes	%	±%
Conservative	John Lamb *	1,572	47.9	+13.1
Liberal Democrats	Katie Kurilecz	1,210	36.9	−3.0
Green	Nathaniel Love	268	8.2	+2.7
Labour	Mick Ekers	230	7.0	+1.6
Majority		362	11.0	
Turnout		3,280	45.8	
Conservative hold		Swing		

=== West Shoebury ===
West Shoebury
Party	Candidate	Votes	%	±%
Conservative	Derek Jarvis *	1,395	56.9	+15.2
Independent	Heather Morgan-Salthouse	450	18.4	−6.8
Labour	Joe Cresswell	331	13.5	−0.4
Green	Alan Appleford	137	5.6	+0.2
Liberal Democrats	Carol White	88	3.6	−3.6
For Britain	Joanne Quail	51	2.1	−4.6
Majority		945	38.5	
Turnout		2,452	33.4	
Conservative hold		Swing		

=== Westborough ===
Westborough (2 seats due to by-election)
Party	Candidate	Votes	%	±%
Labour	Aston Line	920	43.7	+3.5
Labour	Anne Jones *	873	41.4	+1.2
Conservative	Colin Campbell	550	26.1	+10.2
Independent	Dr Vel	424	20.1	+1.8
Liberal Democrats	Suzanna Edey	344	16.3	+9.2
Conservative	Tamkeen Shaikh	343	16.3	+0.4
Liberal Democrats	David Webb	327	15.5	+8.4
Green	Stephen Jordan	220	10.4	−1.7
Green	Vida Guilford	176	8.4	−3.7
Psychedelic Future	Jason Pilley	37	1.8	New
Turnout		—	54.6	
Labour hold				
Labour hold				

== Post-election changes ==
=== By-elections ===
==== Southchurch ====
Southchurch by-election: 3 March 2022
Party	Candidate	Votes	%	±%
Conservative	Darryl Jones	1,025	64.3	+1.1
Independent	Susan Badger	294	18.4	N/A
Labour	Nathaniel Doucette	144	9.0	–7.3
Green	Jo Bates	87	5.5	–2.1
Liberal Democrats	Tristan Bembridge	45	2.8	+0.1
Majority		731	45.9	–1.0
Turnout		1,595		
Conservative hold				
