= Blenheim Park (ward) =

British political subdivision

- Electoral ward for the Southend-on-Sea City Council
- Blenheim Park ward boundaries
- District: Southend-on-Sea
- County: Essex
- Population: 10,994 (2021)
- Area: 2.265 square kilometres (0.875 sq mi)

Current electoral ward
- Created: 2001
- Number of members: 3
- Councillors: Laurie Burton; Donna Richardson; Shahid Nadeem
- Created from: Blenheim, Prittlewell, Westborough
- ONS code: 00KFMQ
- GSS code: E05002213

Blenheim Park is an electoral ward of Southend-on-Sea. It was first used at the 2001 elections. The ward returns three councillors to Southend-on-Sea City Council.

== List of councillors ==
The ward has been represented by three councillors since the first election in 1973.

Term	Councillor	Party
2001–2016	Graham Longley	Liberal Democrats
2001–2011	Jim Clinkscales	Liberal Democrats
2001–2010	Brian Smith	Liberal Democrats
2010–2014	Duncan Russell	Liberal Democrats
2011–2019	James Courtenay	Conservative
2014–2018	Floyd Waterworth (Note: Floyd Waterworth changed parties in 2017.)	UKIP
2014–2018	Floyd Waterworth	Conservative
2016–2024	Helen Boyd	Conservative
2018–present	Laurie Burton	Labour
2019–2023	Keith Evans	Independent
2023–present	Donna Richardson	Labour
2024–present	Shahid Nadeem	Labour

== Summary ==
Councillors elected by party at each regular election.

- Liberal Democrats
- Conservative
- UKIP
- Labour
- Independent

== Southend-on-Sea council elections ==
There was a revision of ward boundaries in Southend-on-Sea in 2001 with all seats up for election that year. The subsequent election cycle for the first Blenheim Park seat was 2002, 2006, 2010, 2014, 2018 and 2022. The cycle for the second seat was 2003, 2007, 2011, 2015, 2019 and 2023. The cycle for the third seat was 2004, 2008, 2012, 2016, 2021 and 2024.

=== 2024 election ===
The election took place on 2 May 2024.

2024 Southend-on-Sea City Council election: Blenheim Park
Party	Candidate	Votes	%	±%
Labour Co-op	Shahid Nadeem	1,089	40.0	+5.9
Conservative	Helen Boyd	677	24.9	–2.9
Independent	Keith Evans	561	20.6	–6.8
Green	AJ Sutherland	223	8.2	+1.7
Liberal Democrats	Pamela Austin	103	3.8	+0.6
Heritage	Lynn Smith	28	1.0	N/A
Confelicity	Luis Lancos	26	1.0	–0.1
Majority		412	15.1	+8.8
Turnout		2,722	33.7	+1.8
Labour Co-op gain from Conservative		Swing	▲4.4	

=== 2023 election ===
The election took place on 4 May 2023.

2023 Southend-on-Sea City Council election: Blenheim Park
Party	Candidate	Votes	%	±%
Labour Co-op	Donna Richardson	878	34.1	–10.2
Conservative	Bernard Arscott	716	27.8	–11.9
Independent	Keith Evans	704	27.4	N/A
Green	AJ Sutherland	167	6.5	+1.5
Liberal Democrats	Joyce Onstad	82	3.2	–2.6
Confelicity	Stan Evans-Jack	26	1.0	–0.1
Majority		162	6.3	+1.7
Turnout		2,583	31.9	
Registered electors		8,097		
Labour Co-op gain from Independent		Swing	▲0.9	

=== 2022 election ===
The election took place on 4 May 2022.

2022 Southend-on-Sea Borough Council election: Blenheim Park
Party	Candidate	Votes	%	±%
Labour	Laurie Burton	1,130	44.3	+5.9
Conservative	Bernard Arscott	1,013	39.7	−2.7
Liberal Democrats	Jill Allen-King	148	5.8	−0.1
Green	AJ Sutherland	127	5.0	−2.6
Independent	Alan Hart	105	4.1	−1.6
Confelicity	James Fackerell	28	1.1	N/A
Majority		117	4.6	
Turnout		2,551		
Labour hold		Swing	▲4.3	

=== 2021 election ===
The election took place on 6 May 2021.

2021 Southend-on-Sea Borough Council election: Blenheim Park
Party	Candidate	Votes	%	±%
Conservative	Helen Boyd	1,151	42.4	+15.9
Labour	Anita Forde	1,043	38.4	+9.3
Green	Abbie Sutherland	205	7.6	+1.7
Liberal Democrats	Jill Allen-King	159	5.9	+1.3
Independent	Alan Hart	155	5.7	−28.4
Majority		108	4.0	—
Turnout		2,713	33.7	
Conservative hold		Swing	▲3.3	

=== 2019 election ===
The election took place on 2 May 2019.

2019 Southend-on-Sea Borough Council election: Blenheim Park
Party	Candidate	Votes	%	±%
Independent	Keith Evans	883	34.1	▲13.7
Labour	Maxine Sadza	755	29.1	▼6.0
Conservative	James Courtenay	688	26.5	▼5.9
Greens	Peter Walker	148	5.9	▲1.7
Liberal Democrats	Charlie Grosvenor	119	4.6	▼3.3
Majority		128	5.0	—
Turnout		2,593	32.6	▲0.7
Independent gain from Conservative		Swing	▲9.9	

No UKIP candidate as previous (-4.1).

Green candidate compared with 2016 election.

=== 2018 election ===
The election took place on 3 May 2018.

2018 Southend-on-Sea Borough Council election: Blenheim Park
Party	Candidate	Votes	%	±%
Labour	Laurie Burton	906	35.1	▲10.5
Conservative	Floyd Waterworth	835	32.4	▲0.8
Independent	Keith Evans	527	20.4	▲15.7
Liberal Democrats	Michael Grimwade	204	7.9	▼6.1
UKIP	Paul Lloyd	106	4.1	▼17.9
Majority		71	2.8	—
Turnout		2,578	31.9	▲2.9
Labour gain from Conservative		Swing	▲4.9	

Floyd Waterworth defected from UKIP to the Conservatives before the election.

No Green candidate as previous (-4.2).

=== 2016 election ===
The election took place on 5 May 2016.

2016 Southend-on-Sea Borough Council election: Blenheim Park
Party	Candidate	Votes	%	±%
Conservative	Helen Boyd	715	31.6	▼6.2
Labour	Matt Dent	555	24.6	▲6.0
UKIP	Roger Weaver	474	21.0	▼1.4
Liberal Democrats	Jill Allen-King	317	14.0	▲0.3
Independent	Colin Ritchie	105	4.7	N/A
Green	Jules Esposito	94	4.2	▼3.4
Majority		160	7.1	▼8.3
Turnout		2,260	29.0	
Conservative gain from Liberal Democrats		Swing	▼6.1	

=== 2015 election ===
The election took place on 7 May 2015.

2015 Southend-on-Sea Borough Council election: Blenheim Park
Party	Candidate	Votes	%	±%
Conservative	James Courtenay	1,930	37.8	▲10.7
UKIP	Paul Lloyd	1,143	22.4	▼9.3
Labour	Matt Dent	947	18.6	▲4.3
Liberal Democrats	Richard Herbert	698	13.7	▼6.0
Greens	Jimmy Wild	386	7.6	▲0.4
Majority		787	15.4	—
Turnout		5,104	64.1	
Conservative hold		Swing	▲10.0	

=== 2014 election ===
The election took place on 22 May 2014.

2014 Southend-on-Sea Borough Council election: Blenheim Park
Party	Candidate	Votes	%	±%
UKIP	Floyd Waterworth	851	31.7	▲15.5
Conservative	Helen Boyd	728	27.1	▼0.8
Liberal Democrats	Duncan Russell	529	19.7	▼10.8
Labour	Dean Trotter	383	14.3	▼2.2
Greens	Julian Esposito	194	7.2	▼1.7
Majority		123	4.6	—
Turnout		2,684		
UKIP gain from Liberal Democrats		Swing	▲13.2	

=== 2012 election ===
The election took place on 3 May 2012.

2012 Southend-on-Sea Borough Council election: Blenheim Park
Party	Candidate	Votes	%	±%
Liberal Democrats	Graham Longley	683	30.5	
Conservative	Julie Cushion	624	27.9	
Labour	Tony Borton	369	16.5	
UKIP	James Mills	362	16.2	
Greens	Paul Davison-Holmes	200	8.9	
Majority		59	2.6	—
Turnout		2,238		
Liberal Democrats hold		Swing		

=== 2011 election ===
The election took place on 5 May 2011.

2011 Southend-on-Sea Borough Council election: Blenheim Park
Party	Candidate	Votes	%	±%
Conservative	James Courtenay	1,017	34.2	
Liberal Democrats	James Clinkscales	959	32.3	
Labour	Tony Borton	553	18.6	
UKIP	Tino Callaghan	442	14.9	
Majority				
Turnout				
Conservative gain from Liberal Democrats		Swing		

=== 2010 election ===
The election took place on 6 May 2010.

2010 Southend-on-Sea Borough Council election: Blenheim Park
Party	Candidate	Votes	%	±%
Liberal Democrats	Duncan Russell	1,949	39.9	–0.3
Conservative	Howard Briggs	1,668	34.2	–5.3
Labour	Ami Willis	609	12.5	+3.4
UKIP	Tino Callaghan	390	8.0	New
BNP	Beradette Jaggers	264	5.4	–5.8
Majority				
Turnout				
Liberal Democrats hold		Swing		

=== 2008 election ===
The election took place on 1 May 2008.

2008 Southend-on-Sea Borough Council election: Blenheim Park
Party	Candidate	Votes	%	±%
Liberal Democrats	Graham Longley	966	40.2	−0.2
Conservative	Ray Davy	950	39.5	+8.8
BNP	Barry Harvey	269	11.2	−0.5
Labour	Simon Morley	220	9.1	−1.5
Majority		16	0.7	−9.1
Turnout		2,405	32.1	+0.3
Liberal Democrats hold		Swing		

=== 2007 election ===
The election took place on 3 May 2007.

2007 Southend-on-Sea Borough Council election: Blenheim Park
Party	Candidate	Votes	%	±%
Liberal Democrats	Jim Clinkscales	982	40.4	+1.5
Conservative	Brian Houssart	745	30.7	−0.7
BNP	Raymond Weaver	284	11.7	+11.7
Labour	Teresa Merrison	257	10.6	−1.5
UKIP	Peggy Walker	162	6.7	−11.0
Majority		237	9.8	+2.3
Turnout		2,430	31.8	−2.4
Liberal Democrats hold		Swing		

=== 2006 election ===
The election took place on 4 May 2006.

2006 Southend-on-Sea Borough Council election: Blenheim Park
Party	Candidate	Votes	%	±%
Liberal Democrats	Brian Smith	1,009	38.9	−7.4
Conservative	Duncan Newham	814	31.4	−9.1
UKIP	Seantino Callaghan	458	17.7	+17.7
Labour	Julian Ware-Lane	313	12.1	−1.2
Majority		195	7.5	+1.7
Turnout		2,594	34.2	−1.7
Liberal Democrats hold		Swing		

=== 2004 election ===
The election took place on 10 June 2004.

2004 Southend-on-Sea Borough Council election: Blenheim Park
Party	Candidate	Votes	%	±%
Liberal Democrats	Graham Longley	1,233	46.3	+2.3
Conservative	Duncan Newham	1,078	40.5	−0.8
Labour	Charles Willis	354	13.3	−1.4
Majority		155	5.8	+3.2
Turnout		2,665	35.9	+8.9
Liberal Democrats hold		Swing		

=== 2003 election ===
The election took place on 1 May 2003.

2003 Southend-on-Sea Borough Council election: Blenheim Park
Party	Candidate	Votes	%	±%
Liberal Democrats	James Clinkscales	888	44.0	−1.7
Conservative	Ian Robertson	835	41.3	+3.4
Labour	Charles Willis	297	14.7	−1.8
Majority		53	2.6	−5.2
Turnout		2,020	27.0	−1.9
Liberal Democrats hold		Swing		

=== 2002 election ===
The election took place on 2 May 2002.

2002 Southend-on-Sea Borough Council election: Blenheim Park
Party	Candidate	Votes	%	±%
Liberal Democrats	Brian Smith	988	45.7	
Conservative	Peter Collins	819	37.9	
Labour	Charles Willis	356	16.5	
Majority		169	7.8	
Turnout		2,163	28.9	−26.8
Liberal Democrats hold		Swing		

=== 2001 election ===
The election took place on 7 June 2001.

2001 Southend-on-Sea Borough Council election: Blenheim Park
Party	Candidate	Votes	%	±%
Liberal Democrats	Graham Longley	1,657		
Liberal Democrats	James Clinkscales	1,613		
Liberal Democrats	Brian Smith	1,559		
Conservative	David Angus	1,514		
Conservative	Margaret Longden	1,375		
Conservative	Peter Collins	1,372		
Labour	Matthew Doody	960		
Labour	Rosemary Merton	936		
Labour	Ernest Webb	840		
Turnout		11,826	55.7	
Liberal Democrats win (new seat)				
Liberal Democrats win (new seat)				
Liberal Democrats win (new seat)				
