= 2014 Southend-on-Sea Borough Council election =

2014 UK local government election

2014 Southend-on-Sea Borough Council
- 22 May 2014

17 out of 51 seats to Southend-on-Sea Borough Council 26 seats needed for a majority
- Turnout: 33.4%
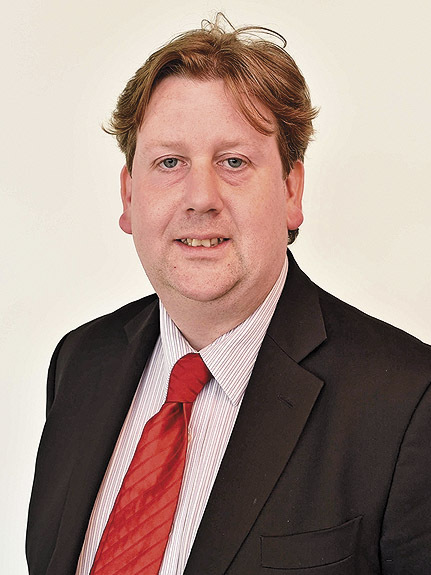

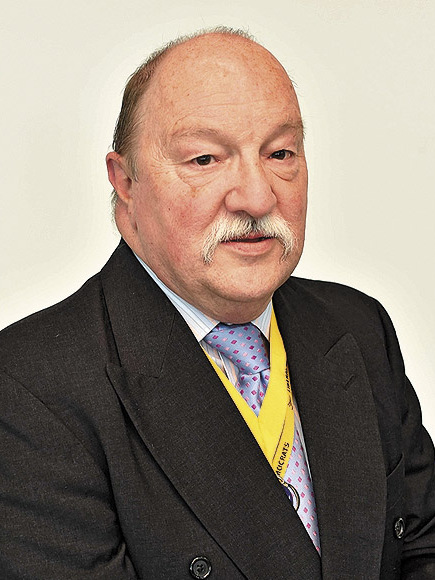
	First party	Second party	Third party
	Con	Ind
Leader	Nigel Holdcroft	N/A	Ian Gilbert
Party	Conservative	Independent	Labour
Leader since	17 May 2007	N/A	Oct/Nov 2010
Leader's seat	West Leigh (Retiring)	N/A	Victoria
Last election	25 seats, 32.7%	10 seats, 20.5%	6 seats, 19.3%
Seats before	26	10	6
Seats won	4	4	4
Seats after	19	13	9
Seat change	▼7	▲3	▲3
Popular vote	13,422	7,918	7,866
Percentage	30.9%	18.2%	18.1%
Swing	▼1.8%	▼2.3%	▼1.2%
	Fourth party	Fifth party
	UKIP
Leader	n/a	Graham Longley
Party	UKIP	Liberal Democrats
Leader since	n/a
Leader's seat	n/a	Blenheim Park
Last election	0 seats, 7.7%	10 seats, 13.9%
Seats before	0	9
Seats won	5	1
Seats after	5	5
Seat change	▲5	▼4
Popular vote	8,168	5,453
Percentage	18.8%	12.6%
Swing	▲11.1%	▼1.3%
- Results of the 2014 Southend-on-Sea Borough Council election
Leader before election
Nigel Holdcroft
Conservative
Leader after election
Ron Woodley
Independent
No overall control

The 2014 Southend-on-Sea Borough Council election took place on 22 May 2014 to elect members of Southend-on-Sea Borough Council in England. This was on the same day as other local elections.

Following the election, an Independent - Labour - Liberal Democrat coalition administration was formed, replacing the previous Conservative administration.

== Results summary ==
2014 Southend-on-Sea Borough Council election
Party	This election			Full council			This election		
Party	Seats	Net	Seats %	Other	Total	Total %	Votes	Votes %	+/−
Conservative	4	▼6	22.2	15	19	37.3	13,422	30.9	–1.8
Independent	4	▲3	22.2	9	13	25.5	7,918	18.2	–2.3
Labour	4	▲2	22.2	5	9	17.6	7,866	18.1	–1.2
UKIP	5	▲5	27.8	0	5	9.8	8,168	18.8	+11.1
Liberal Democrats	1	▼4	5.6	4	5	9.8	5,453	12.6	–1.3
Green	0	Steady	0.0	0	0	0.0	556	1.3	–0.6
National Front	0	Steady	0.0	0	0	0.0	18	0.0	–0.2

== Ward results ==
=== Belfairs ===
Belfairs
Party	Candidate	Votes	%	±%
Conservative	Mo Butler	1,243	44.7	+15.1
Independent	Stephen McKiernan	973	35.0	N/A
Labour	Laura Martin	363	13.0	+2.7
Liberal Democrats	Barry Godwin	204	7.3	–0.3
Majority				
Turnout		2,831	37.39	
Conservative hold		Swing		

=== Blenheim Park ===
Blenheim Park
Party	Candidate	Votes	%	±%
UKIP	Floyd Waterworth	851	31.7	+15.5
Conservative	Helen Boyd	728	27.1	–0.8
Liberal Democrats	Duncan Russell	529	19.7	–10.8
Labour	Dean Trotter	383	14.3	–2.2
Green	Julian Esposito	194	7.2	–1.7
Majority				
Turnout		2,700	33.7	
UKIP gain from Liberal Democrats		Swing		

=== Chalkwell ===
Chalkwell
Party	Candidate	Votes	%	±%
Conservative	Nigel Folkard	849	37.3	–4.4
Independent	Lucy Courtenay	467	20.5	N/A
UKIP	Leonard Stanley	403	17.7	N/A
Labour	Lars Davidsson	397	17.5	–1.6
Liberal Democrats	Colin Davis	158	6.9	–0.6
Majority				
Turnout		2,294	30.89	
Conservative hold		Swing		

=== Eastwood Park ===
Eastwood Park
Party	Candidate	Votes	%	±%
Conservative	Andrew Moring	1,139	41.8	–9.1
UKIP	Paul Lloyd	942	34.6	+17.2
Liberal Democrats	Norah Goodman	380	13.9	–1.9
Labour	Jessica Phillips	264	9.7	–6.2
Majority				
Turnout		2,740	35.77	
Conservative hold		Swing		

=== Kursaal ===
Kursaal
Party	Candidate	Votes	%	±%
UKIP	Lawrence Davies	612	33.5	N/A
Labour	Charles Willis	576	31.5	–7.3
Conservative	Jane Ladner	375	20.5	–10.9
Green	Simon Cross	170	9.3	+1.3
Liberal Democrats	Richard Betson	95	5.2	+0.2
Majority				
Turnout		1,835	23.13	
UKIP gain from Conservative		Swing		

=== Leigh ===
Leigh
Party	Candidate	Votes	%	±%
Liberal Democrats	Carole Mulroney	1,070	44.7	–4.7
Conservative	Barnard Arscott	897	37.5	+6.5
Labour	Matthew Zarb-Cousin	428	17.9	–1.7
Majority				
Turnout		2,472	32.72	
Liberal Democrats hold		Swing		

=== Milton ===
Milton
Party	Candidate	Votes	%	±%
Labour	Cheryl Nevin	848	36.4	+0.6
Conservative	Vic Lee	582	25.0	–7.2
UKIP	Edward McNally	486	20.8	N/A
Independent	Mark Sharp	259	11.1	N/A
Liberal Democrats	Bob Howes	156	6.7	+0.2
Majority				
Turnout		2,352	30.25	
Labour gain from Conservative		Swing		

=== Prittlewell ===
Prittlewell
Party	Candidate	Votes	%	±%
UKIP	Tino Callaghan	970	34.3	+9.1
Conservative	Meg Davidson	849	30.1	+2.8
Liberal Democrats	Mike Grimwade	596	21.1	–9.3
Labour	David Carrington	409	14.5	–2.6
Majority				
Turnout		2,837	35.78	
UKIP gain from Liberal Democrats		Swing		

=== St. Laurence ===
St. Laurence
Party	Candidate	Votes	%	±%
UKIP	Lee Burling	892	37.4	+26.6
Conservative	Jonathan Hodge	673	28.2	–7.7
Liberal Democrats	Ted Lewin	456	19.1	–9.5
Labour	Reginald Copley	366	15.3	–4.0
Majority				
Turnout		2,399	31.27	
UKIP gain from Liberal Democrats		Swing		

=== St. Luke's ===
St. Luke's
Party	Candidate	Votes	%	±%
Independent	Caroline Endersby	965	38.6	N/A
Labour	Gary Sergeant	663	26.5	+0.7
Conservative	Sally Carr	557	22.3	–1.8
Independent	ABC	246	9.8	N/A
Liberal Democrats	Pamela Waldie	70	2.8	+0.6
Majority				
Turnout		2,532	30.7	
Independent gain from Conservative		Swing		

=== Shoeburyness ===
Shoeburyness
Party	Candidate	Votes	%	±%
Independent	Nick Ward	1,243	47.2	N/A
Conservative	Roger Hadley	909	34.5	+5.8
Labour	Maggie Kelly	404	15.3	+2.5
Liberal Democrats	Jane Dresner	77	2.9	N/A
Majority				
Turnout		2,666	30.69	
Independent gain from Conservative		Swing		

=== Southchurch ===
Southchurch
Party	Candidate	Votes	%	±%
Independent	Derek Kenyon	1,196	44.2	N/A
Conservative	Sue Abrahams	1,050	38.8	+3.0
Labour	Sean Jones	372	13.7	+1.1
Liberal Democrats	Carole Roast	88	3.3	+0.5
Majority				
Turnout		2,706	34.66	
Independent gain from Conservative		Swing		

=== Thorpe ===
Thorpe
Party	Candidate	Votes	%	±%
Independent	Martin Terry	2,362	69.6	N/A
Conservative	Alex Kaye	756	22.3	−2.1
Labour	Ian Pope	200	5.9	+1.6
Liberal Democrats	James Clinkscales	77	2.3	+0.8
Majority				
Turnout		3,412	45.42	
Independent hold		Swing		

=== Victoria ===
Victoria
Party	Candidate	Votes	%	±%
Labour	Margaret Borton	803	39.5	–10.9
UKIP	Peter Breuer	617	30.4	+22.6
Conservative	Denis Garne	322	15.9	–9.5
Green	Ian Hurd	192	9.5	+3.2
Liberal Democrats	Ronella Streeter	79	3.9	+0.1
National Front	Beradette Jaggers	18	0.9	–2.2
Majority				
Turnout		2,039	26.8	
Labour hold		Swing		

=== West Leigh ===
West Leigh
Party	Candidate	Votes	%	±%
Conservative	Fay Evans	1,176	40.6	–9.1
Liberal Democrats	Christopher Bailey	827	28.6	–2.0
UKIP	Neil Bettis	634	21.9	N/A
Labour	Jane Norman	256	8.8	–0.3
Majority				
Turnout		2,907	40.5	
Conservative hold		Swing		

=== West Shoebury ===
West Shoebury
Party	Candidate	Votes	%	±%
UKIP	James Moyies	1,226	46.0	+10.2
Conservative	Tony Cox	926	34.8	–4.3
Labour	Matthew Dent	355	13.3	–1.6
Liberal Democrats	Charlie Row	156	5.9	–1.1
Majority				
Turnout		2,675	34.8	
UKIP gain from Conservative		Swing		

=== Westborough ===
Westborough
Party	Candidate	Votes	%	±%
Labour	Kevin Robinson	779	33.2	+2.2
Labour	Michael Royston	726		
UKIP	John Stansfield	535	22.8	N/A
UKIP	Carl Whitwell	474		
Liberal Democrats	Peter Hill	435	18.5	+13.1
Liberal Democrats	Paul Collins	411		
Conservative	David Burzotta	391	16.7	+2.5
Conservative	Jenny Snoad	284		
Independent	Alan Hart	207	8.8	N/A
Majority				
Turnout		4,264	29.23	
Labour gain from Liberal Democrats		Swing		
Labour gain from Independent		Swing		
