= 1999 Southend-on-Sea Borough Council election =

1999 UK local government election

- 6 May 1997

14 out of 39 seats to Southend-on-Sea Borough Council 20 seats needed for a majority

	First party	Second party	Third party
Party	Conservative	Liberal Democrats	Labour
Seats won	7	3	4
Seats after	19	12	8
Seat change	Steady	▼1	▲1
Popular vote	16,448	8,508	10,409
Percentage	46.2%	23.9%	29.2%
Swing	▲6.0%	▼7.9%	▲1.8%
- Winner of each seat at the 1999 Southend-on-Sea Borough Council election.
Council control before election
No overall control
Council control after election
No overall control

The 1999 Southend-on-Sea Borough Council election took place on 6 May 1999 to elect members of Southend-on-Sea Unitary Council in Essex, England. One third of the council was up for election and the council stayed under no overall control.

== Summary ==
=== Overview ===
Before the election the Conservatives needed a swing of less than 5% in order to win a majority on the council, but despite targeting the council they failed to take control. However they came within a single vote of a majority, after Labour came top in both of the seats that were being contested in Milton ward. The second Labour candidate for the ward, Stephen George, was only one vote ahead of the sitting Conservative councillor, Joyce Lambert, thus preventing the Conservatives from holding the critical seat that would have seen them win control of the council.

The Conservatives did gain one seat from the Liberal Democrats in Leigh ward, as the Liberal Democrats lost votes across the council. This saw a number of close results for the Liberal Democrats as they only held Prittlewell by 5 votes from the Conservatives and Westborough by 4 votes over Labour. Overall turnout in the election was 26.5%.

The results meant that the Liberal Democrat and Labour administration, which had run the council for the previous 5 years, would continue.

=== Election result ===
1999 Southend-on-Sea Borough Council election
Party	This election			Full council			This election		
Party	Seats	Net	Seats %	Other	Total	Total %	Votes	Votes %	+/−
Conservative	7	Steady	50.0	12	19	48.7	16,448	46.2	+6.0
Liberal Democrats	3	▼1	21.4	9	12	30.8	8,508	23.9	–7.9
Labour	4	▲1	28.6	4	8	20.5	10,409	29.2	+1.8
Independent	0	Steady	0.0	0	0	0.0	238	0.7	N/A

== Ward results ==
=== Belfairs ===
Belfairs
Party	Candidate	Votes	%	±%
Conservative	Gwendoline Horrigan*	1,997	58.4	+12.8
Liberal Democrats	Colin Ritchie	940	27.5	–11.5
Labour	Raymond Hales	482	14.1	–1.3
Majority		1,057	30.9	N/A
Turnout		3,419	38.1	–38.5
Registered electors		9,001		
Conservative hold		Swing	▲12.2	

=== Blenheim ===
Blenheim
Party	Candidate	Votes	%	±%
Liberal Democrats	Brian Smith*	1,069	40.6	–3.4
Conservative	Peter Collins	1,034	39.2	+5.8
Labour	Teresa Merrison	533	20.2	–2.4
Majority		35	1.3	N/A
Turnout		2,636	28.7	–38.1
Registered electors		9,184		
Liberal Democrats hold		Swing	▼4.6	

=== Chalkwell ===
Chalkwell
Party	Candidate	Votes	%	±%
Conservative	Richard Brown	1,450	54.4	+19.9
Liberal Democrats	Alistair Miller	766	28.8	–5.2
Labour	Philip Hannan	448	16.8	+3.0
Majority		684	25.7	N/A
Turnout		2,664	28.0	–36.7
Registered electors		9,572		
Conservative hold		Swing	▲12.6	

=== Eastwood ===
Eastwood
Party	Candidate	Votes	%	±%
Conservative	Christopher Walker*	1,563	49.5	+12.1
Liberal Democrats	Mary Betson	1,075	34.0	–10.9
Labour	Ernest Webb	520	16.5	–1.3
Majority		488	15.5	N/A
Turnout		3,158	29.9	–41.9
Registered electors		10,582		
Conservative hold		Swing	▲11.5	

=== Leigh ===
Leigh
Party	Candidate	Votes	%	±%
Conservative	John Lamb	1,224	40.3	+4.9
Liberal Democrats	Albert Smulian*	1,140	37.5	–8.7
Labour	Alan Harley	438	14.4	–4.1
Independent	Brian Isaacs	238	7.8	N/A
Majority		84	2.8	N/A
Turnout		3,040	33.8	–36.8
Registered electors		9,068		
Conservative gain from Liberal Democrats		Swing	▲6.8	

=== Milton ===
Milton (2)
Party	Candidate	Votes	%	±%
Labour	Lilias Felton	934	47.0	+1.3
Labour	Stephen George	913	45.9	+0.2
Conservative	Joyce Lambert*	912	45.9	+1.3
Conservative	Ahmad Khwaja	829	41.7	–2.9
Liberal Democrats	Robert Howes	198	10.0	+0.3
Liberal Democrats	Amanda Smith	191	9.6	–0.1
Turnout		2,087	23.9	–28.7
Registered electors		8,740		
Labour hold				
Labour gain from Conservative				

=== Prittlewell ===
Prittlewell
Party	Candidate	Votes	%	±%
Liberal Democrats	David Elf*	918	38.3	–6.0
Conservative	Christopher Kerr	913	38.0	+8.2
Labour	Paul White	569	23.7	–2.4
Majority		5	0.2	N/A
Turnout		2,400	26.8	–35.6
Registered electors		8,972		
Liberal Democrats hold		Swing	▼7.1	

=== St Lukes ===
St Lukes
Party	Candidate	Votes	%	±%
Labour	Michael Royston*	902	54.8	+5.0
Conservative	Johnathan Garston	566	34.4	+3.2
Liberal Democrats	Michael Clark	179	10.9	–8.2
Majority		336	20.4	N/A
Turnout		1,647	19.8	–40.2
Registered electors		8,335		
Labour hold		Swing	▲0.9	

=== Shoebury ===
Shoebury
Party	Candidate	Votes	%	±%
Conservative	Verina Wilson*	1,796	53.0	+6.6
Labour	Lesley Wisken	1,290	38.1	+4.3
Liberal Democrats	Alison Newton	300	8.9	–10.9
Majority		506	14.9	N/A
Turnout		3,386	22.8	–42.8
Registered electors		14,855		
Conservative hold		Swing	▲1.2	

=== Southchurch ===
Southchurch
Party	Candidate	Votes	%	±%
Conservative	Brian Kelly*	1,463	63.3	+12.0
Labour	Denis Garne	627	27.1	–4.4
Liberal Democrats	Michael Woolcott	220	9.5	–7.8
Majority		836	36.2	N/A
Turnout		2,310	26.2	–41.8
Registered electors		8,817		
Conservative hold		Swing	▲8.2	

=== Thorpe ===
Thorpe
Party	Candidate	Votes	%	±%
Conservative	Sally Carr*	1,656	68.5	+11.1
Labour	John Townsend	518	21.4	–2.5
Liberal Democrats	Timothy Ray	242	10.0	–8.7
Majority		1,138	47.1	N/A
Turnout		2,416	24.3	–42.4
Registered electors		9,972		
Conservative hold		Swing	▲6.8	

=== Victoria ===
Victoria
Party	Candidate	Votes	%	±%
Labour	Christopher Dandridge*	1,201	59.2	+6.0
Conservative	Anthony Delaney	597	29.4	–1.8
Liberal Democrats	Paul Collins	232	11.4	–4.3
Majority		604	29.8	N/A
Turnout		2,030	22.1	–34.2
Registered electors		9,194		
Labour hold		Swing	▲3.9	

=== Westborough ===
Westborough
Party	Candidate	Votes	%	±%
Liberal Democrats	Howard Gibeon*	1,038	41.2	–6.7
Labour	Mark Flewitt	1,034	41.0	+13.6
Conservative	Michael Samuel	448	17.8	–6.9
Majority		4	0.2	N/A
Turnout		2,520	29.3	–33.6
Registered electors		8,622		
Liberal Democrats hold		Swing	▼10.2	
