= 2016 Southend-on-Sea Borough Council election =

2016 UK local government election

2016 Southend-on-Sea Borough Council
- 5 May 2016

17 out of 51 seats to Southend-on-Sea Borough Council 26 seats needed for a majority
- Turnout: 30.9%
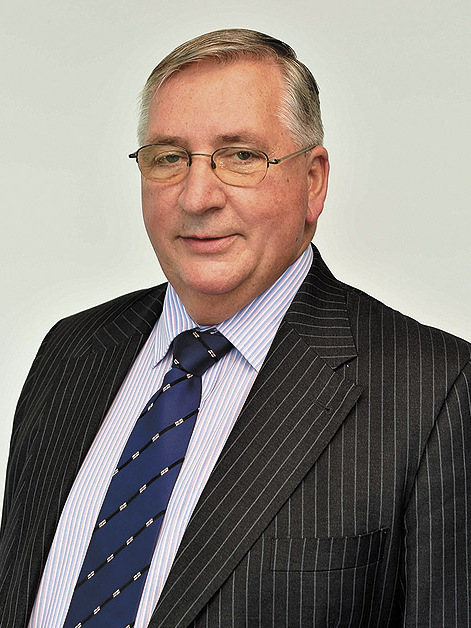

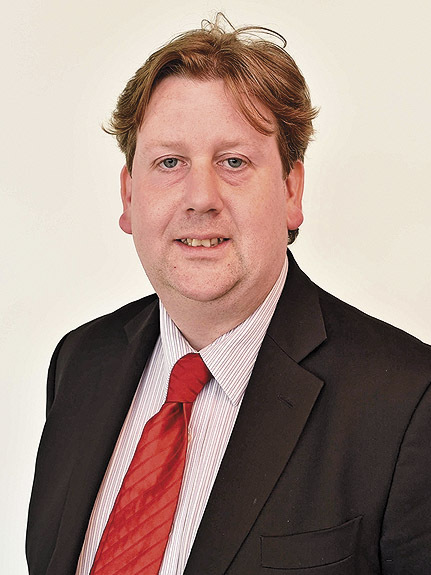

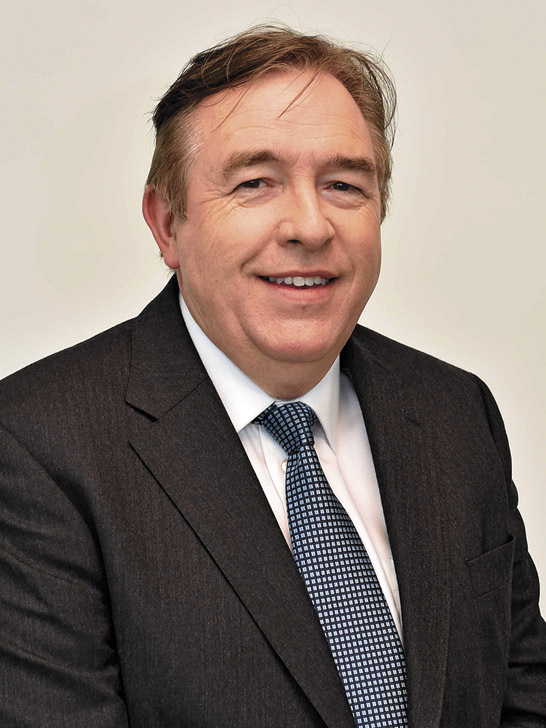

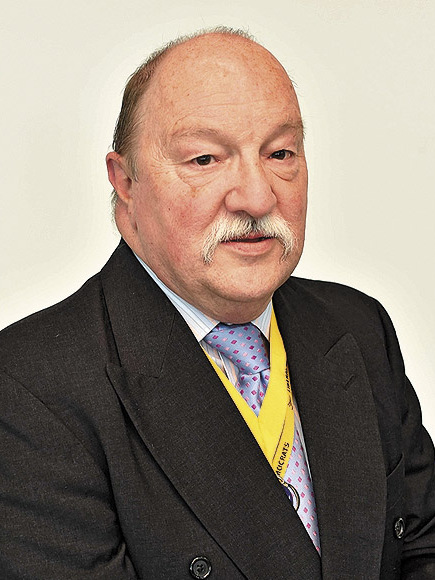
	First party	Second party	Third party
		Ind
Leader	John Lamb	n/a	Ian Gilbert
Party	Conservative	Independent	Labour
Leader since	25 May 2014	n/a	Oct/Nov 2010
Leader's seat	West Leigh	n/a	Victoria
Last election	22 seats, 39.3%	11 seats, 14.3%	9 seats, 19.2%
Seats before	22	14	9
Seats won	8	4	4
Seats after	24	13	10
Seat change	▲2	▲2	▲1
Popular vote	11,383	7,796	7,080
Percentage	30.6%	21.0%	19.0%
Swing	▼9.1%	▲6.6%	▼0.1%
	Fourth party	Fifth party
Leader	Floyd Waterworth	Graham Longley
Party	UKIP	Liberal Democrats
Leader since	May 2015
Leader's seat	Blenheim Park	Blenheim Park (retired)
Last election	5 seats, 10.2%	4 seats, 10.0%
Seats before	2	4
Seats won	0	1
Seats after	2	2
Seat change	▼3	▼2
Popular vote	5,472	3,883
Percentage	14.7%	10.4%
Swing	▲3.7%	▲0.4%
Leader before election
Ron Woodley
Independent
No overall control
Leader after election
John Lamb
Conservative
No overall control

The 2016 Southend-on-Sea Borough Council election took place on 5 May 2016 to elect members of Southend-on-Sea Borough Council. This was on the same day as other local elections.

== Result Summary ==
Prior to the election, three UKIP councillors left the UKIP group to sit as the Southend Independence Group. They are shown in the table as Independents.

2016 Southend-on-Sea Borough Council election
Party	This election			Full council			This election		
Party	Seats	Net	Seats %	Other	Total	Total %	Votes	Votes %	+/−
Conservative	8	▲2	47.1	16	24	49.0	11,383	30.6	–9.1
Independent	4	▼1	23.5	9	13	21.6	7,796	21.0	+6.6
Labour	4	▲1	23.5	6	10	21.6	7,080	19.0	–0.1
UKIP	0	Steady	0.0	2	2	3.9	5,472	14.7	+3.7
Liberal Democrats	1	▼2	5.9	1	2	3.9	3,883	10.4	+0.7
Green	0	Steady	0.0	0	0	0.0	1,598	4.3	–3.0

== Ward results ==
=== Belfairs ===
Belfairs
Party	Candidate	Votes	%	±%
Independent	Stephen Aylen*	1,051	41.6	+32.0
Conservative	Alan Dear	990	39.2	−3.4
Labour	Dave Alston	264	10.5	−1.9
Green	Nick Brown	117	4.6	−0.5
Liberal Democrats	Richard Herbert	102	4.0	−3.9
Majority		61	2.4	N/A
Turnout		2,524	34.2	+1.0
Independent hold		Swing	▲17.7	

=== Blenheim Park ===
Blenheim Park
Party	Candidate	Votes	%	±%
Conservative	Helen Boyd	715	31.6	−6.2
Labour	Matt Dent	555	24.6	+6.0
UKIP	Roger Weaver	474	21.0	−1.4
Liberal Democrats	Jill Allen-King	317	14.0	−0.3
Independent	Colin Ritchie	105	4.7	N/A
Green	Jules Esposito	94	4.2	−3.4
Majority		160	7.1	–8.3
Turnout		2,260	29.0	–35.1
Conservative gain from Liberal Democrats		Swing	▼6.1	

=== Chalkwell ===
Chalkwell
Party	Candidate	Votes	%	±%
Conservative	David Burzotta	817	38.5	−11.0
Independent	Andy Crow	502	23.6	+7.5
Labour	Taylor Barrall	347	16.3	−3.2
UKIP	Paul Lloyd	223	10.5	N/A
Green	Mark Meatcher	124	5.8	−2.5
Liberal Democrats	Colin Davis	112	5.3	−1.3
Majority		315	14.9	–15.0
Turnout		2,125	30.1	–34.1
Conservative hold		Swing	▼9.3	

=== Eastwood Park ===
Eastwood Park
Party	Candidate	Votes	%	±%
Conservative	Chris Walker*	1,022	42.5	−15.4
UKIP	Verina Weaver	644	26.8	N/A
Liberal Democrats	Paul Collins	464	19.3	±0.0
Labour	Sean Jones	222	9.2	−5.6
Green	Fiddian Warman	50	2.1	−6.0
Majority		378	15.7	–22.9
Turnout		2,402	32.5	–33.8
Conservative hold				

=== Kursaal ===
Kursaal
Party	Candidate	Votes	%	±%
Labour	Helen McDonald	709	42.1	+5.6
UKIP	Gordon Bailey-Smith	379	22.5	−1.5
Conservative	Simon Gittus	378	22.5	−2.9
Green	Liz Swanson	141	8.4	−1.2
Liberal Democrats	Richard Collins	75	4.5	−0.1
Majority		330	19.6	+8.5
Turnout		1,682	21.7	–26.6
Labour hold		Swing	▲3.6	

=== Leigh ===
Leigh
Party	Candidate	Votes	%	±%
Liberal Democrats	Peter Wexham	1,185	49.1	+17.1
Conservative	John Hodge	574	23.8	−17.7
Labour	Matt Zarb-Cousin	272	11.3	−3.7
UKIP	Ted Preedy	206	8.5	N/A
Green	Jon Mullett	174	7.2	−4.3
Majority		611	25.3	N/A
Turnout		2,411	32.6	–36.9
Liberal Democrats hold		Swing	▲17.4	

=== Milton ===
Milton
Party	Candidate	Votes	%	±%
Labour	Julian Ware-Lane*	1,020	45.3	+7.5
Conservative	Daniel Nelson	593	26.3	−12.7
UKIP	Jo Googe	297	13.2	N/A
Green	Stephen Bartram	142	6.3	−4.6
Independent	Stephen Cummins	124	5.5	−1.2
Liberal Democrats	Robert Howes	78	3.5	+2.1
Majority		427	19.0	N/A
Turnout		2,254	30.5	–27.4
Labour hold		Swing	▲10.1	

=== Prittlewell ===
Prittlewell
Party	Candidate	Votes	%	±%
Conservative	David Garston*	758	30.1	−16.2
Labour	Mike Fieldhouse	680	27.0	+7.6
UKIP	Bob Gage	473	18.8	N/A
Liberal Democrats	Mary Betson*	253	10.1	−0.7
Independent	Paul Ryder	233	9.3	−5.4
Green	Abbie-Jade Sutherland	118	4.7	−4.1
Majority		78	3.1	–23.8
Turnout		2,515	32.8	–32.3
Conservative gain from Liberal Democrats		Swing	▼11.9	

=== Shoeburyness ===
Shoeburyness
Party	Candidate	Votes	%	±%
Independent	Mike Assenheim*	728	29.0	N/A
Conservative	Sue Abrahams	607	24.1	−14.7
Independent	Anne Chalk	527	21.0	−13.8
UKIP	Edward McNally	309	12.3	N/A
Labour	Maggie Kelly	236	9.4	−8.7
Green	Nigel Outten	57	2.3	−3.3
Liberal Democrats	David Barrett	50	2.0	−0.7
Majority		121	4.9	N/A
Turnout		2,514	29.5	–30.4
Independent hold				

=== Southchurch ===
Southchurch
Party	Candidate	Votes	%	±%
Conservative	Alex Bright	861	35.1	−3.5
Independent	Keith Sharman	800	32.6	+9.6
UKIP	Barrie Page	367	14.9	−1.9
Labour	Ros Sanders	296	12.1	−2.7
Green	Paul Hill	80	3.3	−1.0
Liberal Democrats	Juliet Thompson	52	2.1	−0.4
Majority		61	2.5	–13.1
Turnout		2,456	32.9	–31.0
Conservative hold		Swing	▼6.6	

=== St. Laurence ===
St. Laurence
Party	Candidate	Votes	%	±%
Conservative	Mark Flewitt*	824	38.2	+0.9
UKIP	Viv White	437	20.3	−6.8
Labour	Reg Copley	370	17.1	+2.5
Independent	Kat Woodley	245	11.3	N/A
Liberal Democrats	Ashley Thompson	218	10.1	−2.4
Green	Tanya Rayment	64	3.0	−2.5
Majority		387	17.9	N/A
Turnout		2,158	29.0	–32.7
Conservative hold		Swing	▲3.9	

=== St. Luke's ===
St. Luke's
Party	Candidate	Votes	%	±%
Independent	Brian Ayling*	838	37.0	+4.4
Labour	Donna Richardson	473	20.9	+3.5
Conservative	Del Thomas	464	20.5	−0.4
UKIP	David Stansfield	352	15.6	−2.2
Green	Jason Pilley	104	4.6	−0.2
Liberal Democrats	Tomasz Lachowicz	31	1.4	−1.6
Majority		365	16.1	+4.4
Turnout		2,262	28.3	–30.4
Independent hold		Swing	▲0.5	

=== Thorpe ===
Thorpe
Party	Candidate	Votes	%	±%
Independent	Mike Stafford*	1,873	63.1	+3.3
Conservative	Jon Bacon	475	16.0	−10.3
UKIP	Clive Cowan	297	10.0	N/A
Labour	Rod Birks	184	6.2	–1.1
Green	Jo Bates	83	2.8	−1.4
Liberal Democrats	James Clinkscales	56	1.9	−0.5
Majority		1,398	47.1	+13.6
Turnout		2,968	40.0	–32.5
Independent hold		Swing	▲6.8	

=== Victoria ===
Victoria
Party	Candidate	Votes	%	±%
Labour	Ian Gilbert*	987	54.7	+14.0
UKIP	Peter Breuer	357	19.8	−2.7
Conservative	Dennis Garne	276	15.3	−8.2
Green	Ian Hurd	117	6.5	−2.5
Liberal Democrats	Donna Collins	66	3.7	−0.5
Majority		630	34.9	+17.7
Turnout		1,803	25.0	–25.3
Labour hold		Swing	▲8.4	

=== West Leigh ===
West Leigh
Party	Candidate	Votes	%	±%
Conservative	John Lamb*	1,219	44.6	−7.5
Liberal Democrats	Chris Bailey	769	28.1	+8.5
UKIP	Lesley Martin	313	11.4	−2.6
Labour	Ian Pope	235	8.6	−1.0
Independent	Gabriella Terry	108	4.0	N/A
Green	Sarah Yapp	89	3.3	−1.5
Majority		450	16.5	–16.0
Turnout		2,733	38.7	–39.3
Conservative hold		Swing	▼8.0	

=== West Shoebury ===
West Shoebury
Party	Candidate	Votes	%	±%
Conservative	Derek Jarvis*	810	36.0	−2.0
Independent	Peter Lovett	767	34.1	N/A
UKIP	Lenny Lierens	344	15.3	−6.1
Labour	Joseph Saunders	230	10.2	−2.3
Liberal Democrats	Carole Roast	55	2.4	−2.3
Green	Stephen Jordan	44	2.0	−4.8
Majority		43	1.9	N/A
Turnout		2,250	30.8	–33.2
Conservative hold				

=== Westborough ===
Westborough
Party	Candidate	Votes	%	±%
Labour	Anne Jones	693	33.9	+0.6
Independent	Dr Vel*	451	22.1	+8.5
Conservative	Daryl Peagram	317	15.5	−13.9
UKIP	Frank Snell	263	12.9	N/A
Green	Paul Mansfield	124	6.1	−5.6
Liberal Democrats	Pamela Austin	119	5.8	−2.2
Independent	Alan Hart	77	3.8	−0.3
Majority		242	11.8	+7.9
Turnout		2,044	27.6	–28.4
Labour gain from Independent		Swing	▼4.0	

== By-elections ==
Shoeburyness By-Election 25 May 2017
Party	Candidate	Votes	%	±%
Independent	Anne Chalk	886	37.1	+16.1
Conservative	Val Jarvis	830	34.8	+10.7
Labour	Maggie Kelly	381	16.0	+6.6
UKIP	Edward McNally	121	5.1	−7.2
Liberal Democrats	Gavin Spencer	119	5.0	+3.0
Green	Paul Hill	48	2.0	−0.3
Majority		56	2.3	
Turnout		2,385		
Independent hold		Swing		
