= 1997 Southend-on-Sea Borough Council election =

1997 UK local government election

- 1 May 1997

All 39 seats to Southend-on-Sea Borough Council 20 seats needed for a majority

	First party	Second party	Third party
Party	Conservative	Liberal Democrats	Labour
Seats won	18	14	7
Seat change	▲8	▼4	▼4
Popular vote	90,624	71,766	61,792
Percentage	40.2%	31.8%	27.4%
Swing	▲5.8%	▲1.1%	▼7.5%
- Winner of each seat at the 1997 Southend-on-Sea Borough Council election.
Council control before election
No overall control
Council control after election
No overall control

The 1997 Southend-on-Sea Borough Council election took place on 1 May 1997 to elect members of Southend-on-Sea Borough Council in Essex, England. This was on the same day as the 1997 general election and other local elections.

This was the first election to the council following its establishment as a unitary authority, with the council taking on the powers and responsibilities of Essex County Council for the area. Due to this, the whole council was up for election. However, the ward boundaries and number of seats remained the same.

== Summary ==
=== Election result ===
1997 Southend-on-Sea Borough Council election
Party	This election			Full council			This election		
Party	Seats	Net	Seats %	Other	Total	Total %	Votes	Votes %	+/−
Conservative	18	▲8	46.2	0	18	46.2	90,624	40.2	+5.8
Liberal Democrats	14	▼4	35.9	0	14	35.9	71,766	31.8	+1.1
Labour	7	▼4	17.9	0	7	17.9	61,792	27.4	–7.5
Ind. Conservative	0	Steady	0.0	0	0	0.0	1,233	0.5	N/A

== Ward results ==
=== Belfairs ===
Belfairs (3 seats)
Party	Candidate	Votes	%	±%
Conservative	S. Aylen	3,042	48.9	+5.5
Conservative	H. Briggs*	2,944	47.4	+4.0
Conservative	G. Horrigan	2,915	46.9	+3.5
Liberal Democrats	S. Pawson	2,601	41.8	–1.6
Liberal Democrats	C. Ritchie	2,145	34.5	–8.9
Liberal Democrats	D. Piper	2,059	33.1	–10.3
Labour	N. Boorman	1,028	16.5	+3.2
Labour	A. Crook	963	15.5	+2.2
Labour	J. Norman	952	15.3	+2.0
Turnout		~7,052	76.6	+31.6
Registered electors		9,206		
Conservative gain from Liberal Democrats				
Conservative gain from Liberal Democrats				
Conservative gain from Liberal Democrats				

=== Blenheim ===
Blenheim (3 seats)
Party	Candidate	Votes	%	±%
Liberal Democrats	G. Longley*	2,756	45.2	+4.2
Liberal Democrats	C. Mallam*	2,724	44.7	+3.7
Liberal Democrats	B. Smith*	2,674	43.9	+2.9
Conservative	G. Attridge	2,096	34.4	+5.0
Conservative	P. Collins	2,024	33.2	+3.8
Conservative	G. Hart	1,974	32.4	+3.0
Labour	T. Merrison	1,417	23.3	–6.2
Labour	J. Clinkscales	1,378	22.6	–6.9
Labour	M. Terry	1,235	20.3	–9.2
Turnout		~6,267	66.8	+25.2
Registered electors		9,382		
Liberal Democrats hold				
Liberal Democrats hold				
Liberal Democrats hold				

=== Chalkwell ===
Chalkwell (3 seats)
Party	Candidate	Votes	%	±%
Conservative	C. Latham*	2,400	42.7	–0.4
Liberal Democrats	B. Lister-Smith*	2,368	42.1	–1.9
Conservative	E. Sullivan	2,151	38.3	–4.8
Conservative	B. Trevelyan	2,149	38.2	–4.9
Liberal Democrats	D. Durant	2,050	36.5	–7.5
Liberal Democrats	A. Miller	1,812	32.2	–11.8
Ind. Conservative	J. Tobin	1,233	21.9	N/A
Labour	D. Homer	959	17.1	+4.2
Labour	M. Humphrey	957	17.0	+4.1
Labour	N. Waymark	784	13.9	+1.0
Turnout		~6,343	64.7	+30.9
Registered electors		9,804		
Conservative hold				
Liberal Democrats hold				
Conservative hold				

=== Eastwood ===
Eastwood (3 seats)
Party	Candidate	Votes	%	±%
Liberal Democrats	N. Goodman*	3,314	48.7	+7.0
Conservative	R. Weaver	2,763	40.6	+4.4
Conservative	C. Walker	2,714	39.9	+3.7
Liberal Democrats	M. Betson*	2,696	39.6	–2.1
Liberal Democrats	R. Fisher*	2,579	37.9	–3.8
Conservative	B. Horrigan	2,556	37.6	+1.4
Labour	V. Knights	1,312	19.3	–2.8
Labour	A. Monteith	1,263	18.6	–3.5
Labour	G. Noakes	1,218	17.9	–4.2
Turnout		~7,719	71.8	+37.0
Registered electors		10,750		
Liberal Democrats hold				
Conservative gain from Liberal Democrats				
Conservative gain from Liberal Democrats				

=== Leigh ===
Leigh (3 seats)
Party	Candidate	Votes	%	±%
Liberal Democrats	A. Crystall*	3,052	49.7	+1.8
Liberal Democrats	P. Wexham*	2,884	46.9	–1.0
Liberal Democrats	A. Smulian*	2,581	42.0	–5.9
Conservative	J. Lamb	2,338	38.1	+9.7
Conservative	J. Rowswell	2,207	35.9	+7.5
Conservative	L. Salter	2,121	34.5	+6.1
Labour	P. Circus	1,220	19.9	–3.8
Labour	A. Denny	1,024	16.7	–7.0
Labour	D. Norman	1,006	16.4	–7.3
Turnout		~6,614	70.6	+35.3
Registered electors		9,368		
Liberal Democrats hold				
Liberal Democrats hold				
Liberal Democrats hold				

=== Milton ===
Milton (3 seats)
Party	Candidate	Votes	%	±%
Conservative	R. Davy	1,753	41.2	+6.9
Labour	K. Lee*	1,751	41.2	–13.5
Conservative	J. Lambert	1,747	41.1	+6.8
Labour	P. Hawkins*	1,725	40.6	–14.1
Labour	L. Felton*	1,678	39.5	–15.2
Conservative	A. Khwaja	1,503	35.3	+1.0
Liberal Democrats	J. Overy	937	22.0	+11.0
Liberal Democrats	L. Smith	843	19.8	+8.8
Liberal Democrats	T. Ray	819	19.3	+8.3
Turnout		~4,849	52.6	+27.1
Registered electors		9,219		
Conservative gain from Labour				
Labour hold				
Conservative gain from Labour				

=== Prittlewell ===
Prittlewell (3 seats)
Party	Candidate	Votes	%	±%
Liberal Democrats	M. Miller*	2,570	47.0	–9.0
Liberal Democrats	N. Baker	2,505	45.9	–10.1
Liberal Democrats	D. Elf*	2,489	45.6	–10.4
Conservative	B. Houssart	1,732	31.7	+6.1
Conservative	H. Houssart	1,633	29.9	+4.3
Conservative	P. Manser	1,564	28.6	+3.0
Labour	L. Harley	1,517	27.8	+9.4
Labour	P. White	1,199	22.0	+3.6
Labour	Z. Chaudhri	1,178	21.6	+3.2
Turnout		~5,822	62.4	+30.8
Registered electors		9,330		
Liberal Democrats hold				
Liberal Democrats hold				
Liberal Democrats hold				

=== Shoebury ===
Shoebury (3 seats)
Party	Candidate	Votes	%	±%
Conservative	D. Ascroft*	4,561	53.6	+14.2
Conservative	A. North	3,894	45.8	+6.4
Conservative	V. Wilson	3,621	42.6	+3.2
Labour	L. Wisken*	3,317	39.0	–11.6
Labour	D. Singh	2,650	31.1	–19.5
Labour	R. Kennedy*	2,131	25.0	–25.6
Liberal Democrats	C. Cooper	1,947	22.9	+12.9
Liberal Democrats	A. Newton	1,761	20.7	+10.7
Liberal Democrats	S. Newton	1,646	19.3	+9.3
Turnout		~10,157	65.6	+39.3
Registered electors		15,483		
Conservative hold				
Conservative gain from Labour				
Conservative gain from Labour				

=== Southchurch ===
Southchurch (3 seats)
Party	Candidate	Votes	%	±%
Conservative	D. Garston*	3,095	56.0	+5.9
Conservative	A. Holland*	2,940	53.2	+3.1
Conservative	B. Kelly	2,814	50.9	+0.8
Labour	R. Merton	1,899	34.4	–3.8
Labour	D. Garne	1,568	28.4	–9.8
Labour	I. Pope	1,419	25.7	–12.5
Liberal Democrats	J. Davis	1,044	18.9	+7.2
Liberal Democrats	P. De Gregorio Macdonald	930	16.8	+5.1
Liberal Democrats	M. Woolcott	873	15.8	+4.1
Turnout		~6,249	68.0	+36.9
Registered electors		9,189		
Conservative hold				
Conservative hold				
Conservative hold				

=== St. Luke's ===
St. Luke's (3 seats)
Party	Candidate	Votes	%	±%
Labour	R. Copley*	2,400	54.0	–12.7
Labour	J. Mapp*	2,132	47.9	–18.8
Labour	M. Royston	1,981	44.5	–22.2
Conservative	E. Hodgson	1,503	33.8	+12.1
Conservative	J. Garston	1,486	33.4	+11.7
Conservative	C. Langlands	1,442	32.4	+10.7
Liberal Democrats	A. Smith	921	20.7	+9.1
Liberal Democrats	J. Skinner	823	18.5	+6.9
Liberal Democrats	D. Wainwright	654	14.7	+3.1
Turnout		~5,155	60.0	+32.4
Registered electors		8,592		
Labour hold				
Labour hold				
Labour hold				

=== Thorpe ===
Thorpe (3 seats)
Party	Candidate	Votes	%	±%
Conservative	D. White*	3,483	59.5	+0.9
Conservative	S. Ayre*	3,447	58.9	+0.3
Conservative	S. Carr*	3,421	58.5	–0.1
Labour	G. Farrer	1,453	24.8	–1.1
Labour	W. McIntyre	1,408	24.1	–1.8
Labour	W. Vanderburg	1,267	21.7	–4.2
Liberal Democrats	M. Clark	1,136	19.4	+3.9
Liberal Democrats	D. Holliday	1,015	17.4	+1.9
Liberal Democrats	J. Pilgrim	918	15.7	+0.2
Turnout		~6,719	66.7	–38.0
Registered electors		10,073		
Conservative hold				
Conservative hold				
Conservative hold				

=== Victoria ===
Victoria (3 seats)
Party	Candidate	Votes	%	±%
Labour	J. Dunn*	2,907	55.7	–14.9
Labour	R. Crisp*	2,657	50.9	–19.7
Labour	C. Dandridge*	2,623	50.2	–20.4
Conservative	P. Jones	1,706	32.7	+13.7
Conservative	D. Ayre	1,697	32.5	+13.5
Conservative	K. Norris	1,669	32.0	+13.0
Liberal Democrats	P. Collins	856	16.4	+6.2
Liberal Democrats	C. Etherington	806	15.4	+5.2
Liberal Democrats	C. Verney	741	14.2	+4.0
Turnout		~5,471	56.3	+29.8
Registered electors		9,717		
Labour hold				
Labour hold				
Labour hold				

=== Westborough ===
Westborough (3 seats)
Party	Candidate	Votes	%	±%
Liberal Democrats	J. Sibley*	2,501	50.1	–1.6
Liberal Democrats	M. Lubel*	2,498	50.1	–1.6
Liberal Democrats	H. Gibeon*	2,238	44.8	–6.9
Labour	B. Neal	1,429	28.6	–4.7
Labour	M. Flewitt	1,400	28.1	–5.2
Labour	P. Hannan	1,387	27.8	–5.5
Conservative	S. Compton	1,287	25.8	+10.9
Conservative	R. Brown	1,149	23.0	+8.1
Conservative	M. Samuel	1,083	21.7	+6.8
Turnout		~5,590	62.9	+33.1
Registered electors		8,887		
Liberal Democrats hold				
Liberal Democrats hold				
Liberal Democrats hold				

== By-elections ==
Chalkwell By-Election 19 February 1998
Party	Candidate	Votes	%	±%
Conservative		1,353	48.1	+13.6
Liberal Democrats		1,283	45.6	+11.6
Labour		176	6.3	−7.5
Majority		70	2.5	
Turnout		2,812	29.0	
Conservative gain from Liberal Democrats		Swing		
