= 2007 Southend-on-Sea Borough Council election =

2007 UK local government election

- 3 May 2007

17 out of 51 seats to Southend-on-Sea Borough Council 26 seats needed for a majority

	First party	Second party
Party	Conservative	Liberal Democrats
Seats won	9	4
Seats after	30	10
Seat change	▼1	▲1
Popular vote	16,024	8,656
Percentage	40.9%	22.1%
Swing	▼1.3%	▼3.7%
	Third party	Fourth party
Party	Labour	Independent
Seats won	2	2
Seats after	7	4
Seat change	▼1	▲1
Popular vote	6,156	4,260
Percentage	15.7%	10.9%
Swing	▲3.0%	▲10.6%
- Winner of each seat at the 2007 Southend-on-Sea Borough Council election.
Council control before election
Conservative
Council control after election
Conservative

The 2007 Southend-on-Sea Council election took place on 3 May 2007 to elect members of Southend-on-Sea Borough Council in Essex, England. One third of the council was up for election and the Conservatives stayed in overall control of the council.

== Summary ==
=== Overview ===
The results saw the Conservatives retain control of the council with a majority of 9 seats over the other parties. The former leader of the council, Anna Waite, who had been defeated in the 2006 election, was returned to the council in St Luke's ward after defeating the Labour councillor Kevin Robinson. However the Conservatives lost a usually safe seat in Thorpe to independent Ron Woodley by 791 votes.

For the second election in a row a Conservative leader of the council was defeated. Murray Foster was defeated in Prittlewell ward by Liberal Democrat Ric Morgan, forcing the Conservatives to choose a new leader. Nigel Holdcroft was unopposed within the Conservative group and became the new leader of the council.

Overall turnout in the election was 31%.

=== Election result ===
2007 Southend-on-Sea Borough Council election
Party	This election			Full council			This election		
Party	Seats	Net	Seats %	Other	Total	Total %	Votes	Votes %	+/−
Conservative	9	▼1	52.9	21	30	58.8	16,024	40.9	–1.3
Liberal Democrats	4	▲1	23.5	6	10	19.6	8,656	22.1	–3.7
Labour	2	▼1	11.8	5	7	13.7	6,156	15.7	+3.0
Independent	2	▲1	11.8	2	4	7.8	4,260	10.9	+10.6
BNP	0	Steady	0.0	0	0	0.0	2,334	6.0	+1.4
Green	0	Steady	0.0	0	0	0.0	926	2.4	–0.6
UKIP	0	Steady	0.0	0	0	0.0	667	1.7	–0.3
Mums' Army	0	Steady	0.0	0	0	0.0	115	0.3	±0.0

== Ward results ==
=== Belfairs ===
Belfairs
Party	Candidate	Votes	%	±%
Conservative	Lesley Salter	1,240	47.5	+1.5
Independent	Maria Jeffery	822	31.5	N/A
Liberal Democrats	Ronald Streeter	361	13.8	−9.7
Labour	Gary Farrer	189	7.2	N/A
Majority		418	16.0	+0.5
Turnout		2,612	35.6	−4.3
Registered electors		7,348		
Conservative hold				

=== Blenheim Park ===
Blenheim Park
Party	Candidate	Votes	%	±%
Liberal Democrats	Jim Clinkscales*	982	40.4	+1.5
Conservative	Brian Houssart	745	30.7	−0.7
BNP	Raymond Weaver	284	11.7	N/A
Labour	Teresa Merrison	257	10.6	−1.5
UKIP	Peggy Walker	162	6.7	−11.0
Majority		237	9.8	+2.3
Turnout		2,430	31.8	−2.4
Liberal Democrats hold		Swing	▲1.1	

=== Chalkwell ===
Chalkwell
Party	Candidate	Votes	%	±%
Conservative	Stephen Hebermel	1,179	54.4	−2.0
Liberal Democrats	Chris Mallam	357	16.5	−11.4
Labour	Joan Richards	254	11.7	−4.0
UKIP	Toni Thornes	217	10.0	N/A
Green	Michael Woodgate	162	7.5	N/A
Majority		822	37.9	+9.4
Turnout		2,169	29.6	−3.0
Conservative hold		Swing	▲4.7	

=== Eastwood Park ===
Eastwood Park
Party	Candidate	Votes	%	±%
Conservative	Jason Luty	1,425	63.4	+4.3
Liberal Democrats	Tracey Browne	521	23.2	−8.7
Labour	Raoul Meade	303	13.5	+4.5
Majority		904	40.2	+13.0
Turnout		2,249	30.0	−5.0
Registered electors		7,532		
Conservative hold		Swing	▲6.5	

=== Kursaal ===
Kursaal
Party	Candidate	Votes	%	±%
Labour	Stephen George*	715	39.9	+4.6
Conservative	Blaine Robin	538	30.0	+1.6
BNP	Dean Fenner	276	15.4	−5.8
Liberal Democrats	Matthew Cartwright	265	14.8	−0.3
Majority		177	9.9	+2.9
Turnout		1,794	24.9	−2.9
Registered electors		7,234		
Labour hold		Swing	▲1.5	

=== Leigh ===
Leigh
Party	Candidate	Votes	%	±%
Liberal Democrats	Peter Wexham*	1,414	63.7	+12.3
Conservative	Bernard Arscott	649	29.2	−4.8
Labour	Ian Gilbert	158	7.1	+7.1
Majority		765	34.4	+17.1
Turnout		2,221	31.0	−5.4
Registered electors		7,229		
Liberal Democrats hold		Swing	▲8.6	

=== Milton ===
Milton
Party	Candidate	Votes	%	±%
Conservative	Jonathan Garston*	837	44.3	+4.3
Labour	Clive Rebbeck	528	28.0	+6.9
Liberal Democrats	Paul Collins	187	9.9	−3.3
Independent	John Bacon	134	7.1	−8.5
Green	Stephen Jordan	125	6.6	−3.6
Independent	David Aitken	77	4.1	N/A
Majority		309	16.4	−2.5
Turnout		1,888	26.5	−3.5
Registered electors		7,162		
Conservative hold		Swing	▼1.3	

=== Prittlewell ===
Prittlewell
Party	Candidate	Votes	%	±%
Liberal Democrats	Ric Morgan	1,056	41.6	+0.7
Conservative	Murray Foster*	960	37.8	+1.5
UKIP	John Croft	288	11.4	−6.6
Labour	Llynus Pigrem	233	9.2	+9.2
Majority		96	3.8	−0.7
Turnout		2,537	34.0	−3.4
Registered electors		7,485		
Liberal Democrats gain from Conservative		Swing	▼0.4	

=== St Laurence ===
St Laurence
Party	Candidate	Votes	%	±%
Liberal Democrats	Carole Roast*	1,046	43.9	−11.9
Conservative	Pam Farley	900	37.8	−6.4
Labour	Reginald Copley	288	12.1	N/A
Green	Daniel Lee	150	6.3	N/A
Majority		146	6.1	−5.4
Turnout		2,384	31.7	−1.6
Registered electors		7,581		
Liberal Democrats hold		Swing	▲2.8	

=== St Lukes ===
St Lukes
Party	Candidate	Votes	%	±%
Conservative	Anna Waite	784	33.2	+8.3
Labour	Kevin Robinson*	767	32.4	−0.6
BNP	Geoffrey Strobridge	442	18.7	−3.3
Liberal Democrats	Brian Ayling	222	9.4	−2.6
Green	Cristian Ramis	150	6.3	−1.8
Majority		17	0.7	N/A
Turnout		2,365	29.5	−1.5
Registered electors		8,023		
Conservative gain from Labour		Swing	▲4.5	

=== Shoeburyness ===
Shoeburyness
Party	Candidate	Votes	%	±%
Conservative	Pat Rayner*	788	33.5	–7.1
Independent	Mike Assenheim	658	28.0	+4.2
Labour	Anne Chalk	481	20.5	–6.3
BNP	John Moss	315	13.4	N/A
Liberal Democrats	Jane Dresner	107	4.6	–4.2
Majority		130	5.5	N/A
Turnout		2,349	30.3	−0.6
Registered electors		7,743		
Conservative hold		Swing	▼5.7	

=== Southchurch ===
Southchurch
Party	Candidate	Votes	%	±%
Conservative	Ann Holland*	1,280	54.3	+4.0
BNP	Fenton Bowley	367	15.6	−3.4
Labour	Joyce Mapp	302	12.8	+0.7
Liberal Democrats	Jenny Wexham	261	11.1	−0.6
Green	Stuart Salmon	148	6.3	−0.6
Majority		913	38.7	+7.3
Turnout		2,358	33.1	−3.0
Registered electors		7,172		
Conservative hold		Swing	▲3.7	

=== Thorpe ===
Thorpe
Party	Candidate	Votes	%	±%
Independent	Ron Woodley	1,801	53.8	+24.0
Conservative	Nigel Folkard	1,009	30.2	−12.1
Liberal Democrats	Howard Gibeon	365	10.9	−10.1
Labour	Chris Gasper	170	5.1	−1.7
Majority		792	23.7	N/A
Turnout		3,345	46.3	+2.0
Registered electors		7,239		
Independent gain from Conservative		Swing	▲18.1	

=== Victoria ===
Victoria
Party	Candidate	Votes	%	±%
Labour	David Norman*	744	43.4	+4.9
Conservative	Roger Kemp	442	25.8	+1.4
BNP	Alisdair Lewis	277	16.2	−3.4
Liberal Democrats	Ronella Streeter	252	14.7	−2.8
Majority		302	17.6	+3.5
Turnout		1,715	24.3	−2.6
Registered electors		7,123		
Labour hold		Swing	▲1.8	

=== West Leigh ===
West Leigh
Party	Candidate	Votes	%	±%
Conservative	Gwen Horrigan*	1,626	59.7	+12.7
Liberal Democrats	Albert Wren	755	27.7	–1.9
Green	Paul Circus	191	7.0	–5.9
Labour	Jane Norman	150	5.5	N/A
Majority		871	32.0	N/A
Turnout		2,722	39.3	−5.4
Registered electors		6,967		
Conservative hold		Swing	▲7.3	

=== West Shoebury ===
West Shoebury
Party	Candidate	Votes	%	±%
Conservative	Derek Jarvis*	1,250	54.4	+10.6
BNP	Terence Jellis	373	16.2	+2.8
Labour	Lars Davidsson	308	13.4	+0.3
Liberal Democrats	Mary Betson	251	10.9	+3.5
Mums' Army	Linda Martin	115	5.0	−0.2
Majority		877	38.2	+11.4
Turnout		2,297	31.0	−5.6
Registered electors		7,416		
Conservative hold		Swing	▲3.9	

=== Westborough ===
Westborough
Party	Candidate	Votes	%	±%
Independent	Martin Terry*	768	45.1	+9.6
Conservative	Stephen Buckley	372	21.8	+1.3
Labour	Tony Borton	309	18.1	−2.7
Liberal Democrats	Stephen Vincent	254	14.9	−8.3
Majority		396	23.3	+11.0
Turnout		1,703	23.3	−3.7
Registered electors		7,329		
Independent hold		Swing	▲4.2	

== By-elections ==
Shoeburyness By-Election 20 September 2007
Party	Candidate	Votes	%	±%
Independent	Michael Assenheim	666	34.0	+6.0
Conservative	Graham Hill	494	25.2	−8.8
Labour	Anne Chalk	460	23.5	+3.5
BNP	Alisdair Lewis	273	13.9	+0.9
Liberal Democrats	Jane Dresner	66	3.4	−1.6
Majority		172	8.8	
Turnout		1,959	25.3	
Independent gain from Conservative		Swing		
