= Chalkwell (Southend-on-Sea ward) =

British political subdivision

- Electoral ward for the Southend-on-Sea City Council
- Chalkwell ward boundaries since 2001
- District: Southend-on-Sea
- County: Essex
- Population: 9,926 (2021)
- Major settlements: Chalkwell
- Area: 1.617 square kilometres (0.624 sq mi)

Current electoral ward
- Created: 1974
- Number of members: 3
- Councillors: Stephen Habermel; Nigel Folkard; James Courtenay
- ONS code: 00KFMR
- GSS code: E05002214

Chalkwell is an electoral ward of Southend-on-Sea. The ward has existed since the creation of the district on 1 April 1974 and first used at the 1973 elections. (Note: The predecessor Borough of Southend-on-Sea had a Chalkwell ward from at least 1910.) The ward returns three councillors to Southend-on-Sea City Council for a four-year term at staggered elections in three years out of four. It was subject to boundary revisions in 1976 and 2001. The ward covers Chalkwell.

== List of councillors ==
The ward has been represented by three councillors since the first election in 1973.

Term	Councillor	Party
1973–1984	N. Harris	Conservative
1973–1976	C. Jarman	Conservative
1973–1978	A. Mussett	Conservative
1976–1987	M. Collard	Conservative
1978–1979	T. Murphy	Conservative
1979–1986	A. Daniels	Conservative
1984–1996	J. Tobin	Conservative
1986–1990	J. Wade	Alliance
1987–1991	J. Hendry	Conservative
1990–2007	Charles Latham	Conservative
1991–1998	T. Holdcroft	Conservative
1996–1998	H. Lister-Smith	Liberal Democrats
1997–1999	E. Sullivan	Conservative
1998–2004	Lesley Salter	Conservative
1999–2014	Richard Brown	Conservative
2004–2016	Ian Robertson	Conservative
2007–present	Stephen Habermel	Conservative
2015–present	Nigel Folkard	Conservative
2016–2021	David Burzotta	Conservative
2021–present	James Courtenay	Conservative

== Southend-on-Sea council elections since 2001 ==
There was a revision of ward boundaries in Southend-on-Sea in 2001. Chalkwell ward lost some territory to Leigh. All seats were up for election in 2001. The subsequent election cycle for the first Chalkwell seat was 2002, 2006, 2010, 2014, 2018 and 2022. The cycle for the second seat was 2003, 2007, 2011, 2015, 2019 and 2023. The cycle for the third seat was 2004, 2008, 2012, 2016, 2021 and 2024.

=== 2024 election ===
The election took place on 2 May 2024.

2024 Southend-on-Sea City Council election: Chalkwell
Party	Candidate	Votes	%	±%
Conservative	James Courtenay	975	40.8	–6.7
Labour	Mike O'Connor	868	36.3	+4.7
Green	James Vessey-Miller	331	13.9	+3.9
Liberal Democrats	Christopher Hind	130	5.4	–2.4
Confelicity	Roma Patel	73	3.05	±0.0
Majority		107	4.5	–11.4
Turnout		2,388	33.7	–0.3
Conservative hold		Swing	▲5.7	

=== 2023 election ===
The election took place on 4 May 2023.

2023 Southend-on-Sea City Council election: Chalkwell
Party	Candidate	Votes	%	±%
Conservative	Stephen Habermel	1,147	47.5	+2.7
Labour	David Carrington	762	31.6	+1.9
Green	James Vessey-Miller	241	10.0	+2.6
Liberal Democrats	Christopher Hind	189	7.8	–4.3
Confelicity	Linzi Arkus-Binder	75	3.1	+1.0
Majority		385	15.9	+0.8
Turnout		2,421	34.0	
Registered electors		7,131		
Conservative hold		Swing	▲0.4	

=== 2022 election ===
The election took place on 4 May 2022.

2022 Southend-on-Sea Borough Council election: Chalkwell
Party	Candidate	Votes	%	±%
Conservative	Nigel Folkard	1,023	44.8	−2.7
Labour	Joe Cresswell	678	29.7	+1.2
Liberal Democrats	Christopher Hind	275	12.1	+3.3
Green	RJ Learmouth	168	7.4	−2.0
Women's Equality	Emily Kent	91	4.0	−1.7
Confelicity	Kevin Waller	47	2.1	N/A
Majority		345	15.1	
Turnout		2,282		
Conservative hold		Swing	▼2.0	

=== 2021 election ===
The election took place on 6 May 2021.

2021 Southend-on-Sea Borough Council election: Chalkwell
Party	Candidate	Votes	%	±%
Conservative	James Courtenay	1,219	47.5	+9.2
Labour	Sorraiya Nawaz	732	28.5	+0.9
Green	James Vessey-Miller	241	9.4	+1.5
Liberal Democrats	Christopher Hind	226	8.8	−3.9
Women's Equality	Katie Cohen	147	5.7	+4.2
Majority		487	19.0	+8.3
Turnout		2,565	35.9	
Conservative hold		Swing	▲4.2	

=== 2019 election ===
The election took place on 2 May 2019.

2019 Southend-on-Sea Borough Council election: Chalkwell
Party	Candidate	Votes	%	±%
Conservative	Stephen Habermel	974	38.3	–2.5
Labour	Aston Line	703	27.6	+5.3
Liberal Democrats	Jill Allen-King	322	12.7	+1.4
Independent	Andy Crow	306	12.0	–13.6
Green	Nathaniel Love	200	7.9	New
Women's Equality	Vinice Cowell	38	1.5	New
Majority		271	10.7	–4.5
Turnout		2,543	35.3	+2.6
Conservative hold		Swing	–3.9	

=== 2018 election ===
The election took place on 3 May 2018.

2018 Southend-on-Sea Borough Council election: Chalkwell
Party	Candidate	Votes	%	±%
Conservative	Nigel Folkard	981	40.8	▲2.3
Independent	Andy Crow	616	25.6	▲1.9
Labour	Sean Jones	535	22.3	▲6.0
Liberal Democrats	Jill Allen-King	272	11.3	▲6.0
Majority		365	15.2	—
Turnout		2,404	32.7	—
Conservative hold		Swing	▲0.2	

=== 2016 election ===
The election took place on 5 May 2016.

2016 Southend-on-Sea Borough Council election: Chalkwell
Party	Candidate	Votes	%	±%
Conservative	David Burzotta	817	38.5	−10.9
Independent	Andy Crow	502	23.6	N/A
Labour	Taylor Barrall	347	16.3	−3.2
UKIP	Paul Lloyd	223	10.5	N/A
Green	Mark Meatcher	124	5.8	−2.5
Liberal Democrats	Colin Davis	112	5.3	−1.3
Majority				
Turnout			30.13	
Conservative hold		Swing		

=== 2015 election ===
The election took place on 7 May 2015.

2015 Southend-on-Sea Borough Council election: Chalkwell
Party	Candidate	Votes	%	±%
Conservative	Stephen Habermel	2,266	49.4	
Labour	Lars Davidsson	895	19.5	
Independent	Lucy Courtenay	737	16.1	
Green	Peter Walker	381	8.3	
Liberal Democrats	Jessie Skinner	304	6.6	
Majority				
Turnout				
Conservative hold		Swing		

=== 2014 election ===
The election took place on 22 May 2014.

2014 Southend-on-Sea Borough Council election: Chalkwell
Party	Candidate	Votes	%	±%
Conservative	Nigel Folkard	849	37.3	–4.4
Independent	Lucy Courtenay	467	20.5	New
UKIP	Leonard Stanley	403	17.7	New
Labour	Lars Davidsson	397	17.5	–1.6
Liberal Democrats	Colin Davis	158	6.9	–0.6
Majority				
Turnout		2,294	30.89	
Conservative hold		Swing		

=== 2012 election ===
The election took place on 3 May 2012.

2012 Southend-on-Sea Borough Council election: Chalkwell
Party	Candidate	Votes	%	±%
Conservative	Ian Robertson	799	41.7	
Independent	Nick Ward	490	25.6	
Labour	Lars Davidsson	366	19.1	
Liberal Democrats	Norah Goodman	143	7.5	
English Democrat	Jeremy Moss	117	6.1	
Majority				
Turnout		1,925	26.19	
Conservative hold		Swing		

=== 2011 election ===
The election took place on 5 May 2011.

2011 Southend-on-Sea Borough Council election: Chalkwell
Party	Candidate	Votes	%	±%
Conservative	Stephen Habermel	1,256	47.3	
Independent	Lucy Courtenay	634	23.9	
Labour	Lars Davidsson	481	18.1	
Liberal Democrats	Mark Maguire	285	10.7	
Majority				
Turnout				
Conservative hold		Swing		

=== 2010 election ===
The election took place on 6 May 2010.

2010 Southend-on-Sea Borough Council election: Chalkwell
Party	Candidate	Votes	%	±%
Conservative	Richard Brown	1,997	43.0	–13.8
Liberal Democrats	Chris Mallam	1,046	22.5	+6.1
Independent	Lucy Courtenay	586	12.6	New
Labour	Lars Davidsson	553	11.9	–1.9
UKIP	Keith McLaren	193	4.2	–2.8
Green	Michael Woodgate	153	3.3	New
BNP	David Newman	118	2.5	–3.5
Majority				
Turnout				
Conservative hold		Swing		

=== 2008 election ===
The election took place on 1 May 2008.

2008 Southend-on-Sea Borough Council election: Chalkwell
Party	Candidate	Votes	%	±%
Conservative	Ian Robertson	1,257	56.8	+2.4
Liberal Democrats	Christopher Mallam	363	16.4	−0.1
Labour	Lars Davidsson	306	13.8	+2.1
UKIP	Toni Thornes	154	7.0	−3.0
BNP	James Haggar	132	6.0	+6.0
Majority		894	40.4	+2.5
Turnout		2,212	32.1	+2.5
Conservative hold		Swing		

=== 2007 election ===
The election took place on 3 May 2007.

2007 Southend-on-Sea Borough Council election: Chalkwell
Party	Candidate	Votes	%	±%
Conservative	Stephen Hebermel	1,179	54.4	−2.0
Liberal Democrats	Chris Mallam	357	16.5	−11.4
Labour	Joan Richards	254	11.7	−4.0
UKIP	Toni Thornes	217	10.0	+10.0
Green	Michael Woodgate	162	7.5	+7.5
Majority		822	37.9	+9.4
Turnout		2,169	29.6	−3.0
Conservative hold		Swing		

=== 2006 election ===
The election took place on 4 May 2006.

2006 Southend-on-Sea Borough Council election: Chalkwell
Party	Candidate	Votes	%	±%
Conservative	Richard Brown	1,309	56.4	+0.0
Liberal Democrats	John Adams	648	27.9	+5.4
Labour	John Aitkin	365	15.7	+2.9
Majority		661	28.5	−5.5
Turnout		2,322	32.6	−2.8
Conservative hold		Swing		

=== 2005 by-election ===
The by-election took place on 5 May 2005.

2005 Chalkwell by-election
Party	Candidate	Votes	%	±%
Conservative	Robin Carlile	1,870	44.7	
Liberal Democrats	Stephen Vincent	1,146	27.4	
Labour	Lydia Sookias	772	18.4	
UKIP	Leonard Lierens	219	5.2	
Independent	John Bacon	179	4.3	
Majority		724	17.3	
Turnout		4,186	57.4	
Conservative hold		Swing		

=== 2004 election ===
The election took place on 10 June 2004.

2004 Southend-on-Sea Borough Council election: Chalkwell
Party	Candidate	Votes	%	±%
Conservative	Ian Robertson	1,434	56.4	−5.8
Liberal Democrats	Sara Coyle	571	22.5	−0.9
Labour	Lydia Sookias	325	12.8	−1.5
English Democrat	Jeremy Moss	211	8.3	+8.3
Majority		863	34.0	−4.8
Turnout		2,541	35.4	+9.5
Conservative hold		Swing		

=== 2003 election ===
The election took place on 1 May 2003.

2003 Southend-on-Sea Borough Council election: Chalkwell
Party	Candidate	Votes	%	±%
Conservative	Charles Latham	1,155	62.2	+2.4
Liberal Democrats	Richard Gage	435	23.4	+4.8
Labour	Lydia Sookias	266	14.3	+0.5
Majority		720	38.8	−2.4
Turnout		1,856	25.9	−1.9
Conservative hold		Swing		

=== 2002 election ===
The election took place on 2 May 2002.

2002 Southend-on-Sea Borough Council election: Chalkwell
Party	Candidate	Votes	%	±%
Conservative	Richard Brown	1,217	59.8	
Liberal Democrats	Ronald Alexander	379	18.6	
Labour	Lydia Sookias	280	13.8	
Independent	Donald Weedon	160	7.9	
Majority		838	41.2	
Turnout		2,036	27.8	−25.1
Conservative hold		Swing		

=== 2001 election ===
The election took place on 7 June 2001.

2001 Southend-on-Sea Borough Council election: Chalkwell
Party	Candidate	Votes	%	±%
Conservative	Lesley Salter	1,950		
Conservative	Charles Latham	1,875		
Conservative	Richard Brown	1,830		
Liberal Democrats	Roger Fisher	1,067		
Liberal Democrats	Ronald Alexander	1,022		
Liberal Democrats	Derek Holliday	815		
Labour	Joyce Mapp	708		
Labour	Lydia Sookias	602		
Labour	Sylvia Sookias	510		
Turnout		10,379	52.9	
Conservative win (new boundaries)				
Conservative win (new boundaries)				
Conservative win (new boundaries)				

== 1997–2001 Southend-on-Sea council elections ==
Chalkwell ward boundaries from 1976 to 2001

The electoral cycle was restarted on 1 May 1997 without change of ward boundaries, to coincide with Southend-on-Sea Borough Council becoming a unitary authority on 1 April 1998. All seats were up for election in 1997.

=== 2000 election ===
The election took place on 4 May 2000.

2000 Southend-on-Sea Borough Council election: Chalkwell
Party	Candidate	Votes	%	±%
Conservative	Lesley Salter	1,633	60.0	+5.6
Liberal Democrats	Roger Fisher	623	22.9	−5.9
Labour	Ruth Jarvis	285	10.5	−6.3
UKIP	David Cooper-Walker	179	6.6	+6.6
Majority		1,010	37.1	+11.4
Turnout		2,720	28.3	+0.3
Conservative hold		Swing		

=== 1999 election ===
The election took place on 6 May 1999.

1999 Southend-on-Sea Borough Council election: Chalkwell
Party	Candidate	Votes	%	±%
Conservative	Richard Brown	1,450	54.4	
Liberal Democrats	Alistair Miller	766	28.8	
Labour	Philip Hannan	448	16.8	
Majority		684	25.7	
Turnout		2,664	28.0	
Conservative hold		Swing		

=== 1998 by-election ===
The by-election took place on 19 February 1998.

1998 Chalkwell by-election
Party	Candidate	Votes	%	±%
Conservative	Lesley Salter	1,353	48.1	+13.6
Liberal Democrats		1,283	45.6	+11.6
Labour		176	6.3	−7.5
Majority		70	2.5	
Turnout		2,812	29.0	
Conservative gain from Liberal Democrats		Swing		

=== 1997 election ===
The election took place on 1 May 1997.

1997 Southend-on-Sea Borough Council election: Chalkwell
Party	Candidate	Votes	%	±%
Conservative	C. Latham	2,400	34.5	
Liberal Democrats	B. Lister-Smith	2,368	34.0	
Conservative	E. Sullivan	2,151		
Conservative	B. Trevelyan	2,149		
Liberal Democrats	D. Durant	2,050		
Liberal Democrats	A. Miller	1,812		
Ind. Conservative	J. Tobin	1,233	17.7	
Labour	D. Homer	959	13.8	
Labour	M. Humphrey	957		
Labour	N. Waymark	784		
Turnout			64.7	
Conservative hold				
Liberal Democrats hold				
Conservative hold				

== 1976–1997 Southend-on-Sea council elections ==
There was a revision of ward boundaries in Southend-on-Sea in 1976.

=== 1996 election ===
The election took place on 2 May 1996.

1996 Southend-on-Sea Borough Council election: Chalkwell
Party	Candidate	Votes	%	±%
Liberal Democrats	H. Lister-Smith	1,444	44.0	
Conservative	J. Tobin	1,416	43.1	
Labour	M. Humphrey	425	12.9	
Majority			0.9	
Turnout			33.8	
Liberal Democrats gain from Conservative		Swing		

=== 1995 election ===
The election took place on 4 May 1995.

1995 Southend-on-Sea Borough Council election: Chalkwell
Party	Candidate	Votes	%	±%
Conservative	T. Holdcroft	1,498	42.3	
Liberal Democrats	H. Lister-Smith	1,454	41.0	
Labour	J. Mapp	592	16.7	
Majority			1.3	
Turnout			36.7	
Conservative hold		Swing		

=== 1994 election ===
The election took place on 5 May 1994.

1994 Southend-on-Sea Borough Council election: Chalkwell
Party	Candidate	Votes	%	±%
Conservative	C. Latham	1,686	45.1	
Liberal Democrats	H. Lister-Smith	1,568	42.0	
Labour	J. Mapp	481	12.9	
Majority			3.1	
Turnout			40.6	
Conservative hold		Swing		

=== 1992 election ===
The election took place on 7 May 1992.

1992 Southend-on-Sea Borough Council election: Chalkwell
Party	Candidate	Votes	%	±%
Conservative	J. Tobin	2,128	64.1	
Liberal Democrats	H. Lister-Smith	941	28.4	
Labour	J. Mapp	249	7.5	
Majority			35.7	
Turnout			36.2	
Conservative hold		Swing		

=== 1991 election ===
The election took place on 2 May 1991.

1991 Southend-on-Sea Borough Council election: Chalkwell
Party	Candidate	Votes	%	±%
Conservative	T. Holdcroft	2,051	54.4	
Liberal Democrats	J. Wade	1,228	32.6	
Labour	J. Mapp	399	10.6	
Liberal	G. Wilkinson	94	2.5	
Majority			21.8	
Turnout			41.3	
Conservative hold		Swing		

=== 1990 election ===
The election took place on 3 May 1990.

1990 Southend-on-Sea Borough Council election: Chalkwell
Party	Candidate	Votes	%	±%
Conservative	C. Latham	2,214		
Liberal Democrats	J. Wade	1,534		
Labour	J. Mapp	532		
Liberal	G. Wilkinson	146		
Turnout				
Conservative gain from Liberal Democrats		Swing		

=== 1988 election ===
The election took place on 5 May 1988.

1988 Southend-on-Sea Borough Council election: Chalkwell
Party	Candidate	Votes	%	±%
Conservative	J. Tobin	2,049		
Liberal Democrats	E. Bunclark	1,463		
Labour	L. Davidson	314		
Turnout				
Conservative hold		Swing		

=== 1987 election ===
The election took place on 7 May 1987.

1987 Southend-on-Sea Borough Council election: Chalkwell
Party	Candidate	Votes	%	±%
Conservative	J. Hendry	2,357		
Alliance	R. Mandil-Wade	2,084		
Labour	P. Harrison	290		
Turnout				
Conservative hold		Swing		

=== 1986 election ===
The election took place on 8 May 1986.

1986 Southend-on-Sea Borough Council election: Chalkwell
Party	Candidate	Votes	%	±%
Alliance	J. Wade	1,916		
Conservative	M. Myers	1,834		
Labour	A. Rothwell	314		
Turnout				
Alliance gain from Conservative		Swing		

=== 1984 election ===
The election took place on 3 May 1984.

1984 Southend-on-Sea Borough Council election: Chalkwell
Party	Candidate	Votes	%	±%
Conservative	J. Tobin	1,659		
Alliance	A. Petchey	1,439		
Labour	A. Rothwell	263		
Turnout				
Conservative hold		Swing		

=== 1983 election ===
The election took place on 5 May 1983.

1983 Southend-on-Sea Borough Council election: Chalkwell
Party	Candidate	Votes	%	±%
Conservative	M. Collard	2,166		
Alliance	A. Petchey	1,441		
Labour	S. Laycock	295		
Turnout				
Conservative hold		Swing		

=== 1982 election ===
The election took place on 6 May 1982.

1982 Southend-on-Sea Borough Council election: Chalkwell
Party	Candidate	Votes	%	±%
Conservative	A. Daniels	2,369		
Alliance	J. Keith	1,212		
Labour	M. Howells	300		
Turnout				
Conservative hold		Swing		

=== 1980 election ===
The election took place on 1 May 1980.

1980 Southend-on-Sea Borough Council election: Chalkwell
Party	Candidate	Votes	%	±%
Conservative	N. Harris	2,044		
Liberal	P. Willetts	1,064		
Labour	D. Bason	374		
Turnout				
Conservative hold		Swing		

=== 1979 election ===
The election took place on 3 May 1979.

1979 Southend-on-Sea Borough Council election: Chalkwell
Party	Candidate	Votes	%	±%
Conservative	M. Collard	3,915		
Conservative	A. Daniels	3,773		
Liberal	P. Willetts	1,882		
Liberal	R. Wood	1,728		
Labour	D. Bason	713		
Labour	K. Leaman	695		
Turnout				
Conservative hold		Swing		
Conservative hold		Swing		

=== 1978 election ===
The election took place on 4 May 1978.

1978 Southend-on-Sea Borough Council election: Chalkwell
Party	Candidate	Votes	%	±%
Conservative	T. Murphy	2,581		
Liberal	J. Keith	947		
Labour	K. Leaman	275		
Turnout				
Conservative hold		Swing		

=== 1976 election ===
The election took place on 6 May 1976.

1976 Southend-on-Sea Borough Council election: Chalkwell
Party	Candidate	Votes	%	±%
Conservative	N. Harris	2,377		
Conservative	M. Collard	2,269		
Conservative	A. Mussett	2,237		
Liberal	J. Keith	1,254		
Liberal	V. Macfarlane	1,137		
Liberal	J. Wood	1,033		
Labour	W. Lakin	366		
Labour	T. Sheppey	329		
Labour	R. Spack	322		
Turnout				
Conservative win (new boundaries)				
Conservative win (new boundaries)				
Conservative win (new boundaries)				

== 1973–1976 Southend-on-Sea council elections ==
Chalkwell ward has existed since the creation of the district of Southend-on-Sea on 1 April 1974. The predecessor Borough of Southend-on-Sea had a Chalkwell ward from at least 1910.

=== 1973 election ===
The election took place on 10 May 1973.

1973 Southend-on-Sea Borough Council election: Chalkwell
Party	Candidate	Votes	%	±%
Conservative	N. Harris	1,342		
Conservative	C. Jarman	1,287		
Conservative	A. Mussett	1,264		
Liberal	F. Owens	817		
Liberal	J. Wood	742		
Liberal	R. Wood	725		
Labour	L. Morriss	310		
Labour	R. Spack	211		
Labour	V. Quinloan	208		
Turnout				
Conservative win (new seat)				
Conservative win (new seat)				
Conservative win (new seat)				
