= 2019 Southend-on-Sea Borough Council election =

2019 UK local government election

2019 Southend-on-Sea Borough Council
← 2018	2 May 2019	2021 →

17 out of 51 seats to Southend-on-Sea Borough Council 26 seats needed for a majority
- Turnout: 31.7%
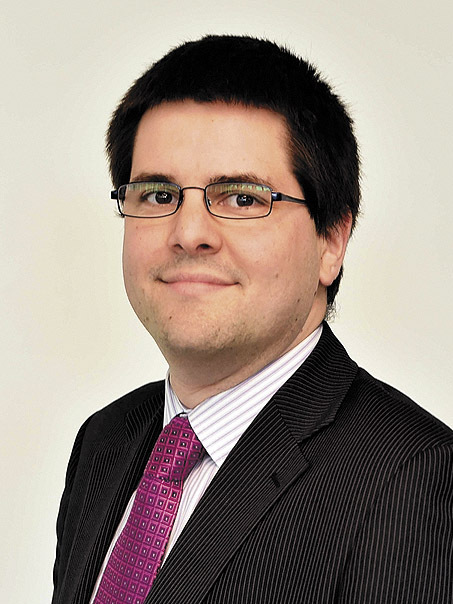

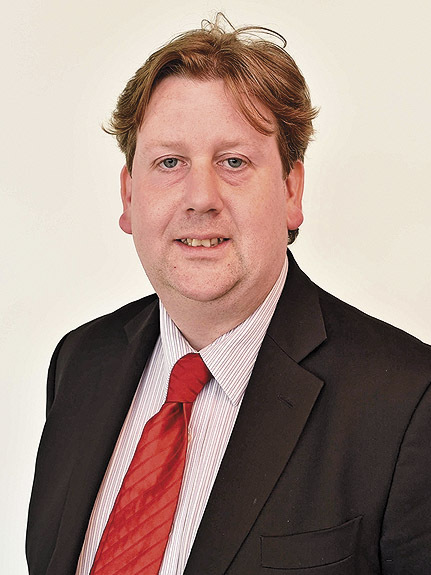

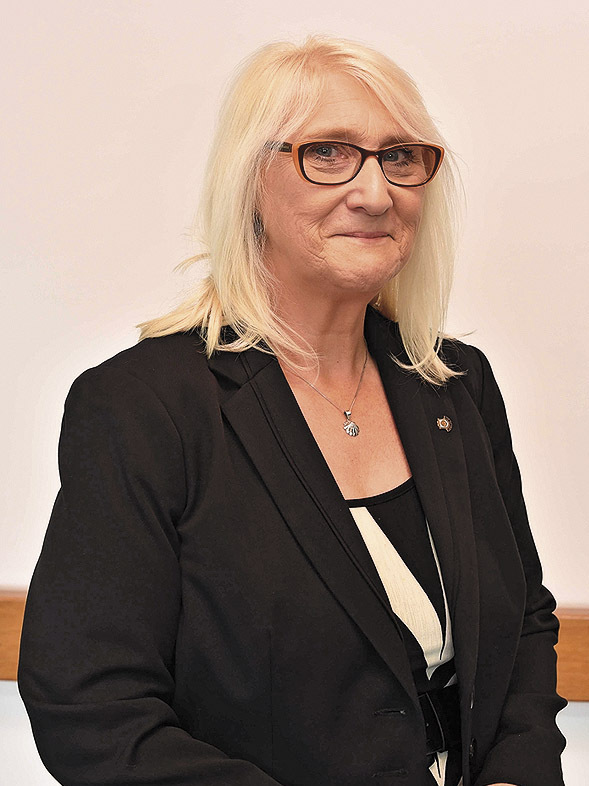
	First party	Second party	Third party
			Ind
Leader	James Courtenay	Ian Gilbert	n/a
Party	Conservative	Labour	Independent
Leader since	8 March 2019	Oct/Nov 2010	n/a
Leader's seat	Blenheim Park (defeated)	Victoria	n/a
Last election	29 seats, 37.0%	11 seats, 27.0%	9 seats, 19.5%
Seats before	28	11	10
Seats won	4	5	5
Seats after	20	14	12
Seat change	▼8	▲3	▲2
Popular vote	11,265	8,962	10,097
Percentage	27.0%	20.8%	24.2%
Swing	▼10.0%	▼6.2%	▲4.7%
	Fourth party	Fifth party
		Green
Leader	Carole Mulroney	n/a
Party	Liberal Democrats	Green
Leader since	May 2017	n/a
Leader's seat	Leigh	n/a
Last election	2 seats, 12.7%	0 seats, 2.8%
Seats before	2	0
Seats won	3	0
Seats after	5	0
Seat change	▲3	Steady
Popular vote	5,848	3,126
Percentage	14.1%	7.5%
Swing	▲1.4%	▲4.7%
- Map showing council seats results contested during the election

Leader before election
John Lamb
Conservative
Leader after election
Tony Cox
Conservative
No overall control

Elections to Southend-on-Sea Borough Council took place on 2 May 2019. This was on the same day as other local elections across the United Kingdom.

The election led to the majority Conservative administration being replaced by a "rainbow coalition" between the Independents, Labour and the Liberal Democrats, which was voted in by a vote of 27-20.

== Composition ==
Directly after the 2018 election the composition of the council was:

↓
11	2	9	29
Labour	Lib Dem	Ind	Conservative

Prior to the election the composition of the council was:

↓
11	2	10	28
Labour	Lib Dem	Ind	Conservative

After the election, the composition of the council was:

↓
14	5	12	20
Labour	Lib Dem	Ind	Conservative

== Summary ==
=== Election result ===
2019 Southend-on-Sea Borough Council election
Party	This election			Full council			This election		
Party	Seats	Net	Seats %	Other	Total	Total %	Votes	Votes %	+/−
Conservative	4	▼8	23.5	16	20	39.2	11,265	27.0	–10.0
Labour	5	▲3	29.4	9	14	27.5	8,962	20.8	–6.2
Independent	5	▲2	29.4	7	12	23.5	10,097	24.2	+4.8
Liberal Democrats	3	▲3	17.6	2	5	9.8	5,848	14.1	+1.4
Green	0	Steady	0.0	0	0	0.0	3,126	7.5	+4.7
UKIP	0	Steady	0.0	0	0	0.0	1,960	4.7	+3.8
For Britain	0	Steady	0.0	0	0	0.0	344	0.1	N/A
Psychedelic Future	0	Steady	0.0	0	0	0.0	51	0.0	±0.0
Women's Equality	0	Steady	0.0	0	0	0.0	38	0.0	N/A

== Ward results ==
=== Belfairs ===
Belfairs
Party	Candidate	Votes	%	±%
Conservative	Lesley Pamela Salter*	862	34.5	–15.9
Independent	Bob Hazell	795	31.9	+15.6
UKIP	David Arthur Darling	286	11.5	+5.6
Labour	Rachel Louise Charman Dalton	232	9.3	–6.7
Green	Nick Brown	183	7.3	+2.7
Liberal Democrats	Michael Russel Grimwade	138	5.5	–0.7
Majority		67	2.7	–38.7
Turnout		2,496	33.6	–1.6
Conservative hold		Swing	▼15.8	

=== Blenheim Park ===
Blenheim Park
Party	Candidate	Votes	%	±%
Independent	Keith Evans	883	34.1	+13.7
Labour	Maxine Sadza	755	29.1	–6.0
Conservative	James Courtenay*	688	26.5	–5.9
Green	Peter Walker	148	5.9	N/A
Liberal Democrats	Charlie Grosvenor	119	4.6	–3.3
Majority		128	5.0	N/A
Turnout		2,593	32.6	+0.7
Independent gain from Conservative		Swing	▼9.9	

No UKIP candidate as previous (−4.1).

=== Chalkwell ===
Chalkwell
Party	Candidate	Votes	%	±%
Conservative	Stephen John Habermel*	974	38.3	–2.5
Labour	Aston Line	703	27.6	+5.3
Liberal Democrats	Jill Allen-King	322	12.7	+1.4
Independent	Andy Crow	306	12.0	–13.6
Green	Nathaniel William Love	200	7.9	N/A
Women's Equality	Vinice Bridget Cowell	38	1.5	N/A
Majority		271	10.7	–4.5
Turnout		2,543	35.3	+2.6
Conservative hold		Swing	▼3.9	

=== Eastwood Park ===
Eastwood Park
Party	Candidate	Votes	%	±%
Liberal Democrats	Paul Collins	1,182	46.0	+13.7
Conservative	Judith McMahon*	580	22.6	–32.2
UKIP	Lynne Joyce Lawer	350	13.6	N/A
Independent	Trevor Byford*	248	9.7	N/A
Labour	Ruth Jones	140	5.4	–7.5
Green	Thomas Love	68	2.6	N/A
Majority		602	23.4	N/A
Turnout		2,568	34.3	+2.1
Liberal Democrats gain from Independent		Swing	▲23.0	

=== Kursaal ===
Kursaal
Party	Candidate	Votes	%	±%
Labour	Maggie Kelly	693	35.0	–16.9
Green	Simon Cross	384	19.4	N/A
Liberal Democrats	Howard Gibeon	341	17.2	–6.3
Conservative	Brian Beggs	282	14.2	–10.5
Independent	Anthony Dillon	279	14.1	N/A
Majority		309	15.6	–11.6
Turnout		1,979	25.0	+0.6
Labour gain from Conservative				

=== Leigh ===
Leigh
Party	Candidate	Votes	%	±%
Liberal Democrats	Ashley Thompson	1,052	40.5	+0.9
Conservative	Bernard Arscott*	701	27.0	–5.4
Labour	Hilary Scarnell	413	15.9	–5.7
Green	Daniel Garrun	228	8.8	+2.4
UKIP	Romney Sheilds	155	6.0	N/A
Psychedelic Future	Jason Pilley	51	2.0	N/A
Majority		351	13.5	+6.2
Turnout		2,600	34.5	–1.3
Liberal Democrats gain from Conservative		Swing	▲3.2	

=== Milton ===
Milton
Party	Candidate	Votes	%	±%
Labour	Kay Mitchell	1,101	49.1	–1.6
Conservative	Jonathan Garston*	634	28.3	–3.9
Green	Vida Guildford	285	12.7	+7.0
Liberal Democrats	Carol White	223	9.9	+5.4
Majority		467	20.8	+2.4
Turnout		2,243	27.7	–3.8
Labour gain from Conservative		Swing	▲1.2	

No For Britain candidate (−5.3) as previous.

=== Prittlewell ===
Prittlewell
Party	Candidate	Votes	%	±%
Conservative	Meg Davidson*	994	41.0	+0.7
Independent	Simon Wakefield	536	22.1	+5.4
Labour	Jes Phillips	463	19.1	–11.4
Green	Reece Learmouth	217	8.9	+3.8
Liberal Democrats	Bob Howes	215	8.9	+1.5
Majority		458	18.9	+9.0
Turnout		2,425	31.3	–2.1
Conservative hold		Swing	▼2.4	

=== Shoeburyness ===
Shoeburyness
Party	Candidate	Votes	%	±%
Independent	Steven Wakefield	771	33.5	–15.6
Conservative	Roger Hadley*	736	32.0	+0.8
Labour	Tricia Cowdrey	385	16.7	–0.9
For Britain	James Quail	191	8.3	N/A
Green	Jon Mullet	137	6.0	N/A
Liberal Democrats	Granville Stride	80	3.5	+1.5
Majority		35	1.5	–16.4
Turnout		2,300	26.5	–2.0
Independent gain from Conservative		Swing	▼8.2	

=== Southchurch ===
Southchurch
Party	Candidate	Votes	%	±%
Independent	Ian Shead	839	34.1	+6.8
Conservative	Martin Skam	810	32.9	–14.6
Labour	Colin Nickless	338	13.7	–5.0
UKIP	Grant Dennison	274	11.1	N/A
Green	Jules Esposito	110	4.5	+0.5
Liberal Democrats	John Batch	92	3.7	+1.2
Majority		29	1.2	N/A
Turnout		2,463	32.7	–0.6
Independent gain from Conservative		Swing	▲10.7	

=== St. Laurence ===
St. Laurence
Party	Candidate	Votes	%	±%
Labour	Daniel Cowan	725	26.0	+8.4
Independent	Kimberly O'Connell	686	24.6	–6.7
Conservative	Steve Buckley*	662	23.7	–10.7
UKIP	John Rowlandson	347	12.4	N/A
Liberal Democrats	Karl Lansley	296	10.6	–6.1
Green	Tanya Rayment	72	2.6	N/A
Majority		39	1.4	N/A
Turnout		2,788	35.5	+3.7
Labour gain from Conservative		Swing	▲9.6	

=== St. Luke's ===
St. Luke's
Party	Candidate	Votes	%	±%
Independent	Paul van Looy*	1,257	54.6	+17.2
Labour	Ian Pope	500	21.7	–10.4
Conservative	Laura Moyies	316	13.7	–8.0
Green	James Vessey-Miller	154	6.7	+2.9
Liberal Democrats	Jessie Skinner	77	3.3	+0.2
Majority		350	15.2	+9.9
Turnout		2,304	28.3	+0.6
Independent hold		Swing	▲13.8	

No Psychedelic Future (−1.8) candidate as previous.

=== Thorpe ===
Thorpe
Party	Candidate	Votes	%	±%
Independent	Ron Woodley*	2,232	72.4	+13.8
Conservative	Azeem Raja	380	12.3	–17.0
Labour	Janet Phillips	234	7.6	–2.0
Green	Jo Bates	154	5.0	N/A
Liberal Democrats	James Clinkscales	84	2.7	+0.2
Majority		1,852	60.1	+30.8
Turnout		3,084	41.7	–1.0
Independent hold		Swing	▲15.4	

=== Victoria ===
Victoria
Party	Candidate	Votes	%	±%
Labour	Jennifer Beck	943	50.2	–10.8
Conservative	James Moyies	308	16.4	–8.2
UKIP	Daryl Peagram	283	15.1	N/A
Green	Denis Walker	238	12.7	–1.7
Liberal Democrats	Pamela Austin	108	5.7	N/A
Majority		635	33.8	–2.7
Turnout		1,880	22.8	–2.5
Labour hold		Swing	▼1.3	

=== West Leigh ===
West Leigh
Party	Candidate	Votes	%	±%
Liberal Democrats	Beth Hooper	1,203	39.9	+5.5
Conservative	Georgina Phillips*	1,048	34.8	–14.4
UKIP	Lesley Martin	265	8.8	+4.5
Green	Leonie Fleischmann	167	5.5	N/A
Independent	Tony Ayre	166	5.5	N/A
Labour	Michael Ekers	163	5.4	–6.7
Majority		155	5.1	N/A
Turnout		3,012	42.5	–0.3
Liberal Democrats gain from Conservative		Swing	▲10.0	

=== West Shoebury ===
West Shoebury
Party	Candidate	Votes	%	±%
Conservative	Tony Cox*	950	41.7	–2.9
Independent	Freddie Dawkins	574	25.2	–7.2
Labour	Joseph Saunders	317	13.9	–1.1
Liberal Democrats	David Barrett	164	7.2	–0.8
For Britain	James Quail	153	6.7	N/A
Green	Fiona Clapperton	122	5.4	N/A
Majority		376	16.5	+4.3
Turnout		2,280	30.8	–1.9
Conservative hold		Swing	▲2.2	

=== Westborough ===
Westborough
Party	Candidate	Votes	%	±%
Labour	Charles Willis*	857	40.2	–12.2
Independent	Dr Vel	391	18.3	N/A
Conservative	Jack Warren	340	15.9	–8.8
Green	Stephen Jordan	259	12.1	+6.1
Liberal Democrats	Billy Boulton	152	7.1	–0.9
Independent	Alan Hart	134	6.3	–2.6
Majority		466	21.8	–7.0
Turnout		2,133	28.0	–0.5
Labour hold				
