= Ripuarian =

Ripuarian may refer to:

- Ripuarian Franks, a subset of Frankish people who lived in the Rhineland
- Ripuarian language, a West Central German dialect group
- Riparian water rights (or simply riparian rights) a system for allocating water among those who possess land along its path
- Riparian zone (or riparian area), the interface between land and a river or stream
- Riparian-zone restoration, the ecological restoration of riparian zone habitats of streams, rivers, springs, lakes, floodplains, and other hydrologic ecologies

== See also ==
- London Stone (riparian), the name given to a number of boundary stones which stand beside the rivers Thames and Medway, which formerly marked the limits of jurisdiction of the City of London
