= 1983 Southend-on-Sea Borough Council election =

1983 English local election

← 1982	5 May 1983	1984 →

13 out of 39 seats to Southend-on-Sea Borough Council 20 seats needed for a majority

	First party	Second party	Third party
Party	Conservative	Alliance	Labour
Seats won	10	3	0
Seats after	27	9	3
Seat change	▲1	▲1	▼2
Popular vote	25,330	17,180	9,255
Percentage	48.9%	33.2%	17.9%
Swing	▼0.1%	▼0.9%	▲1.8%
- Winner of each seat at the 1983 Southend-on-Sea Borough Council election.
Council control before election
Conservative
Council control after election
Conservative

The 1983 Southend-on-Sea Borough Council election took place on 5 May 1983 to elect members of Southend-on-Sea Borough Council in Essex, England. This was on the same day as other local elections.

== Summary ==
=== Election result ===
1983 Southend-on-Sea Borough Council election
Party	This election			Full council			This election		
Party	Seats	Net	Seats %	Other	Total	Total %	Votes	Votes %	+/−
Conservative	10	▲1	76.9	17	27	69.2	25,330	48.9	–0.1
Alliance	3	▲1	23.1	6	9	23.1	17,180	33.2	–0.9
Labour	0	▼2	0.0	3	3	7.7	9,255	17.9	+1.8
Independent	0	Steady	0.0	0	0	0.0	24	<0.1	–0.7

== Ward results ==
Incumbent councillors standing for re-election are marked with an asterisk (*). Changes in seats do not take into account by-elections or defections.

=== Belfairs ===
Belfairs
Party	Candidate	Votes	%	±%
Conservative	V. Smith*	2,263	49.2	–3.7
Alliance	F. Gane	1,980	43.0	+2.5
Labour	P. Haines	360	7.8	+1.2
Majority		283	6.1	–6.3
Turnout		4,603	47.4	+2.9
Registered electors		9,710		
Conservative hold		Swing	▼3.1	

=== Blenheim ===
Blenheim
Party	Candidate	Votes	%	±%
Conservative	E. Watson-Lamb*	1,959	47.4	–1.4
Alliance	J. Murray	1,480	35.8	–1.8
Labour	M. Howard	698	16.9	+3.3
Majority		479	11.6	+0.4
Turnout		4,137	42.6	+1.2
Registered electors		9,861		
Conservative hold		Swing	▲0.2	

=== Chalkwell ===
Chalkwell
Party	Candidate	Votes	%	±%
Conservative	M. Collard*	2,166	55.5	–5.5
Alliance	A. Petchey	1,441	36.9	+5.7
Labour	S. Laycock	295	7.6	–0.1
Majority		725	18.6	–11.2
Turnout		3,902	40.9	–0.1
Registered electors		9,653		
Conservative hold		Swing	▼5.6	

=== Eastwood ===
Eastwood
Party	Candidate	Votes	%	±%
Alliance	G. Longley	1,918	46.6	+5.9
Conservative	J. Rowswell	1,878	45.6	–6.1
Labour	P. Johnson	322	7.8	+0.2
Majority		40	1.0	N/A
Turnout		4,118	39.2	+5.5
Registered electors		10,653		
Alliance gain from Conservative		Swing	▲6.0	

=== Leigh ===
Leigh
Party	Candidate	Votes	%	±%
Alliance	A. Crystall*	2,476	52.1	–0.5
Conservative	A. Hall	2,002	42.1	–0.3
Labour	L. Davidson	249	5.2	+0.2
Independent	C. Newman	24	0.5	N/A
Majority		474	10.0	–0.2
Turnout		4,751	51.0	+3.1
Registered electors		9,417		
Alliance hold		Swing	▼0.1	

=== Milton ===
Milton
Party	Candidate	Votes	%	±%
Conservative	J. Carlile*	1,453	55.6	+6.7
Labour	R. Kennedy	697	26.7	+6.2
Alliance	J. Overy	461	17.7	+0.9
Majority		756	29.0	+0.7
Turnout		2,611	32.1	+0.4
Registered electors		8,207		
Conservative hold		Swing	▲0.3	

=== Prittlewell ===
Prittlewell
Party	Candidate	Votes	%	±%
Alliance	J. Armitage*	1,994	47.3	–0.6
Conservative	L. Myers	1,640	38.9	–0.1
Labour	P. Long	586	13.9	+0.8
Majority		354	8.4	–0.5
Turnout		4,220	42.9	+2.0
Registered electors		9,966		
Alliance hold		Swing	▼0.4	

=== Shoebury ===
Shoebury
Party	Candidate	Votes	%	±%
Conservative	J. Lowe	2,434	50.5	–0.3
Labour	A. Hurst	1,704	35.4	+8.6
Alliance	Y. Rushman	680	14.1	–8.3
Majority		730	15.2	–8.9
Turnout		4,818	42.5	+1.9
Registered electors		11,500		
Conservative gain from Labour		Swing	▼4.3	

=== Southchurch ===
Southchurch
Party	Candidate	Votes	%	±%
Conservative	D. Garston*	2,444	60.2	+5.0
Alliance	M. Burstin	879	21.6	–1.5
Labour	G. White	740	18.2	–3.5
Majority		1,565	38.5	+6.3
Turnout		4,063	41.2	+2.2
Registered electors		10,011		
Conservative hold		Swing	▲3.3	

=== St Lukes ===
St Lukes
Party	Candidate	Votes	%	±%
Conservative	C. Hudson	1,186	38.3	+1.5
Labour	D. Waring	1,142	36.9	+5.3
Alliance	G. Gibeon	770	24.9	–6.7
Majority		44	1.4	–3.9
Turnout		3,098	36.4	+2.9
Registered electors		8,516		
Conservative hold		Swing	▼1.9	

=== Thorpe ===
Thorpe
Party	Candidate	Votes	%	±%
Conservative	B. Scholfield*	2,738	68.4	+1.1
Alliance	J. Magnay	736	18.4	–1.2
Labour	M. Hurley	527	13.2	+0.2
Majority		2,002	50.0	+2.3
Turnout		4,001	39.2	+5.0
Registered electors		10,351		
Conservative hold		Swing	▲1.2	

=== Victoria ===
Victoria
Party	Candidate	Votes	%	±%
Conservative	A. Cole	1,378	41.2	+1.8
Labour	G. Elvin*	1,279	38.2	+4.1
Alliance	N. Baker	691	20.6	–5.9
Majority		99	3.0	–2.3
Turnout		3,348	34.5	+2.9
Registered electors		9,699		
Conservative gain from Labour		Swing	▼1.2	

=== Westborough ===
Westborough
Party	Candidate	Votes	%	±%
Conservative	G. Littler*	1,789	43.4	+3.0
Alliance	P. Jack	1,674	40.6	–1.0
Labour	A. Smith	656	15.9	–2.1
Majority		115	2.8	N/A
Turnout		4,119	46.4	+3.8
Registered electors		8,973		
Conservative hold		Swing	▲2.0	
