= 2004 Southend-on-Sea Borough Council election =

2004 UK local government election

- 10 June 2004

17 out of 51 seats to Southend-on-Sea Borough Council 26 seats needed for a majority

	First party	Second party
Party	Conservative	Labour
Seats won	12	2
Seats after	33	9
Seat change	▲1	▼1
Popular vote	21,136	7,084
Percentage	49.5%	16.6%
Swing	▲1.7%	▼2.0%
	Third party	Fourth party
Party	Liberal Democrats	Independent
Seats won	2	1
Seats after	7	2
Seat change	▼1	▲1
Popular vote	11,136	1,005
Percentage	26.1%	2.4%
Swing	▼1.9%	▲0.1%
- Winner of each seat at the 2004 Southend-on-Sea Borough Council election.
Council control before election
Conservative
Council control after election
Conservative

The 2004 Southend-on-Sea Council election took place on 10 June 2004 to elect members of Southend-on-Sea Unitary Council in Essex, England. One third of the council was up for election and the Conservative Party stayed in overall control of the council.

After the election, the composition of the council was:

- Conservative 33
- Labour 9
- Liberal Democrat 7
- Independent 2

== Summary ==
The results saw the Conservatives make one gain in the election to hold control of the council with 33 seats. The Conservative gain came in St Lukes ward where they defeated the Labour councillor, Reg Copley, who had been first elected to the council in 1963. They also came within 4 votes of gaining Kursaal, but the only other change was an independent gain from the Liberal Democrats in Westborough.

=== Election result ===
2004 Southend-on-Sea Borough Council election
Party	This election			Full council			This election		
Party	Seats	Net	Seats %	Other	Total	Total %	Votes	Votes %	+/−
Conservative	12	▲1	70.6	21	33	64.7	21,136	49.5	+1.7
Labour	2	▼1	11.8	7	9	17.6	7,084	16.6	–2.0
Liberal Democrats	2	▼1	11.8	5	7	13.7	11,136	26.1	–1.9
Independent	1	▲1	5.9	1	2	3.9	1,005	2.4	+0.1
Green	0	Steady	0.0	0	0	0.0	1,205	2.8	+0.4
UKIP	0	Steady	0.0	0	0	0.0	695	1.6	N/A
English Democrat	0	Steady	0.0	0	0	0.0	436	1.0	N/A

== Ward results ==
=== Belfairs ===
Belfairs
Party	Candidate	Votes	%	±%
Conservative	Stephen Aylen*	1,641	54.4	+3.9
Liberal Democrats	Michael Grimwade	1,028	34.1	−4.9
Labour	Cheryl Nevin	347	11.5	+1.1
Majority		613	20.3	+8.8
Turnout		3,016	41.9	+11.6
Registered electors		7,266		
Conservative hold		Swing	▲4.4	

=== Blenheim Park ===
Blenheim Park
Party	Candidate	Votes	%	±%
Liberal Democrats	Graham Longley*	1,233	46.3	+2.3
Conservative	Duncan Newham	1,078	40.5	−0.8
Labour	Charles Willis	354	13.3	−1.4
Majority		155	5.8	+3.2
Turnout		2,665	35.9	+8.9
Registered electors		7,555		
Liberal Democrats hold		Swing	▲1.6	

=== Chalkwell ===
Chalkwell
Party	Candidate	Votes	%	±%
Conservative	Ian Robertson	1,434	56.4	−5.8
Liberal Democrats	Sara Coyle	571	22.5	−0.9
Labour	Lydia Sookias	325	12.8	−1.5
English Democrat	Jeremy Moss	211	8.3	N/A
Majority		863	34.0	−4.8
Turnout		2,541	35.4	+9.5
Registered electors		7,222		
Conservative hold		Swing	▼2.5	

=== Eastwood Park ===
Eastwood Park
Party	Candidate	Votes	%	±%
Conservative	Christopher Walker*	1,563	55.2	+3.9
Liberal Democrats	Norah Goodman	1,028	36.3	−3.7
Labour	Raoul Meade	240	8.5	−0.2
Majority		535	18.9	+7.6
Turnout		2,831	38.1	+10.1
Registered electors		7,522		
Conservative hold		Swing	▲3.8	

=== Kursaal ===
Kursaal
Party	Candidate	Votes	%	±%
Labour	Denis Game*	627	34.5	−17.0
Conservative	Tony Cox	623	34.2	+3.6
English Democrat	Adrian Key	225	12.4	N/A
Liberal Democrats	Robert Howes	203	11.2	−6.7
Green	Paul Circus	142	7.8	N/A
Majority		4	0.2	−20.7
Turnout		1,820	26.8	+8.3
Registered electors		6,811		
Labour hold		Swing	▼10.3	

=== Leigh ===
Leigh
Party	Candidate	Votes	%	±%
Liberal Democrats	Alan Crystall*	1,414	54.4	−6.8
Conservative	Simon Gutteridge	936	36.0	+9.7
Labour	Tony Borton	247	9.5	+3.4
Majority		478	18.4	−16.6
Turnout		2,597	37.7	+6.6
Registered electors		7,017		
Liberal Democrats hold		Swing	▼8.3	

=== Milton ===
Milton
Party	Candidate	Votes	%	±%
Conservative	Raymond Davy*	1,068	51.2	−0.9
Labour	Ian Gilbert	576	27.6	+0.9
Liberal Democrats	Marion Boulton	441	21.2	+7.9
Majority		492	23.6	−1.7
Turnout		2,085	30.9	+8.7
Registered electors		6,796		
Conservative hold		Swing	▼0.9	

=== Prittlewell ===
Prittlewell
Party	Candidate	Votes	%	±%
Conservative	Ronald Price*	1,303	45.8	−1.5
Liberal Democrats	Michael O'Connor	926	32.5	−1.7
Labour	Margaret Borton	338	11.9	−0.2
Green	Andrea Black	279	9.8	+3.4
Majority		377	13.2	+0.1
Turnout		2,846	38.2	+11.2
Registered electors		7,493		
Conservative hold		Swing	▲0.1	

=== St Laurence ===
St Laurence
Party	Candidate	Votes	%	±%
Conservative	Mark Flewitt	1,013	35.6	−2.5
Liberal Democrats	Peter Dolby	861	30.2	−17.6
UKIP	Peter O'Kane	695	24.4	N/A
Labour	Paul White	280	9.8	−4.3
Majority		152	5.3	N/A
Turnout		2,849	38.7	+12.5
Registered electors		7,416		
Conservative hold		Swing	▲7.6	

=== St Lukes ===
St Lukes
Party	Candidate	Votes	%	±%
Conservative	Melvyn Day	858	38.1	−0.1
Labour	Reginald Copley*	677	30.1	−12.8
Liberal Democrats	Brian Ayling	404	18.0	+6.7
Green	Steve Flynn	311	13.8	+6.2
Majority		181	8.0	N/A
Turnout		2,250	29.8	+11.8
Registered electors		7,581		
Conservative gain from Labour		Swing	▲6.4	

=== Shoeburyness ===
Shoeburyness
Party	Candidate	Votes	%	±%
Conservative	David Ascroft*	1,274	60.2	+3.5
Labour	Anne Chalk*	561	26.5	−6.5
Liberal Democrats	Colin Spraggs	283	13.4	+3.1
Majority		713	33.7	+10.0
Turnout		2,118	29.2	+9.6
Registered electors		7,323		
Conservative hold		Swing	▲5.0	

=== Southchurch ===
Southchurch
Party	Candidate	Votes	%	±%
Conservative	David Garston*	1,672	64.8	−7.0
Labour	Clive Rebbeck	369	14.3	−0.8
Liberal Democrats	Linda Smith	281	10.9	−2.2
Green	Adrian Hedges	260	10.1	N/A
Majority		1,303	50.5	−6.3
Turnout		2,582	36.8	+12.0
Registered electors		7,323		
Conservative hold		Swing	▼3.1	

=== Thorpe ===
Thorpe
Party	Candidate	Votes	%	±%
Conservative	Sally Carr*	2,073	73.5	−1.6
Liberal Democrats	Timothy Ray	430	15.2	+3.1
Labour	Joyce Mapp	318	11.3	−1.5
Majority		1,643	58.2	−4.1
Turnout		2,821	40.2	+12.9
Registered electors		7,098		
Conservative hold		Swing	▼2.4	

=== Victoria ===
Victoria
Party	Candidate	Votes	%	±%
Labour	Christopher Dandridge*	794	42.6	−3.2
Conservative	Paul Jones	643	34.5	+13.4
Liberal Democrats	Paul Collins	425	22.8	+13.1
Majority		151	8.1	−16.5
Turnout		1,862	27.5	+5.6
Registered electors		6,873		
Labour hold		Swing	▼8.3	

=== West Leigh ===
West Leigh
Party	Candidate	Votes	%	±%
Conservative	John Lamb*	1,935	59.6	+2.2
Liberal Democrats	Albert Wren	896	27.6	−5.6
Green	Doris Thomas	213	6.6	+2.0
Labour	Deborah Robinson	200	6.2	+1.4
Majority		1,039	32.0	+7.9
Turnout		3,244	48.1	+11.9
Registered electors		6,771		
Conservative hold		Swing	▲3.9	

=== West Shoebury ===
West Shoebury
Party	Candidate	Votes	%	±%
Conservative	Anthony North*	1,661	67.9	−1.1
Labour	Lee Craven	486	19.9	−0.1
Liberal Democrats	Amanda Spraggs	301	12.3	+1.3
Majority		1,175	48.0	−1.0
Turnout		2,448	34.3	+11.0
Registered electors		7,203		
Conservative hold		Swing	▼0.5	

=== Westborough ===
Westborough
Party	Candidate	Votes	%	±%
Independent	Marimuthu Velmurugan	1,005	46.8	+9.9
Liberal Democrats	George Lewin	438	20.4	+0.1
Conservative	Ahmad Khwaja	361	16.8	+3.8
Labour	Julian Ware-Lane	345	16.1	−6.6
Majority		567	26.4	+12.2
Turnout		2,149	32.2	+7.1
Registered electors		6,738		
Independent gain from Liberal Democrats		Swing	▲4.9	

== By-elections ==
Chalkwell By-Election 5 May 2005
Party	Candidate	Votes	%	±%
Conservative	Robin Carlile	1,870	44.7	
Liberal Democrats	Stephen Vincent	1,146	27.4	
Labour	Lydia Sookias	772	18.4	
UKIP	Leonard Lierens	219	5.2	
Independent	John Bacon	179	4.3	
Majority		724	17.3	
Turnout		4,186	57.4	
