= Chalkwell =

Suburb of Southend-on-Sea, Essex, England

Coordinates: 51.541°N 0.676°E

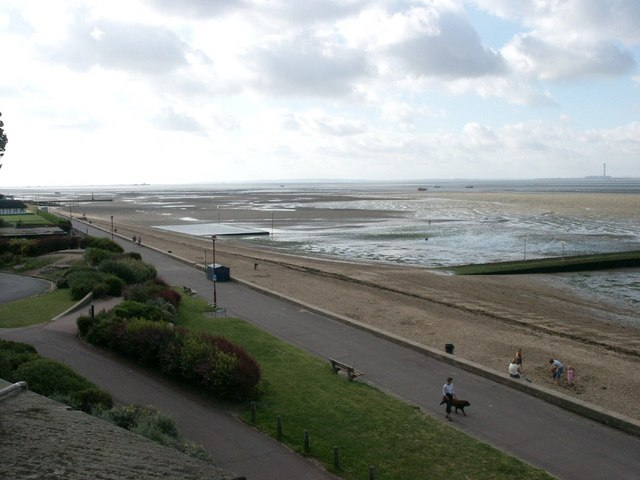
- Chalkwell Esplanade

- Location within Essex
- Population: 9,930 (2021 Census)
- OS grid reference: TQ889640
- Unitary authority: Southend-on-Sea
- Ceremonial county: Essex
- Region: East
- Country: England
- Sovereign state: United Kingdom
- Post town: WESTCLIFF-ON-SEA
- Postcode district: SS0
- Dialling code: 01702
- Police: Essex
- Fire: Essex
- Ambulance: East of England
- UK Parliament: Southend West

Chalkwell is a suburb of the city of Southend-on-Sea, in the ceremonial county of Essex, England. It is situated on the north bank of the Thames Estuary and is in traditional (Note: Church of England terms.) terms still part of Westcliff-on-Sea. The ward of Chalkwell is bordered by Woodfield Road, Leigh-on-Sea to the west, London Road to the North and Valkyrie Road, Westcliff-on-Sea to the east.

== History ==
Chalkwell as a suburb started in the early 20th century as a housing development on the former farmland of the Chalkwell Hall estate. The name is believed to be derived from chalk pits dug by farmers to neutralise acid soil. On the second Ordnance Survey map of 1897 it showed the area as open fields and brickworks. The current hall stands on the site of previous halls and was built in 1830, with the site opening as a public park in 1903 after the land and hall were purchased by Southend-on-Sea Borough Council. Nikolaus Pevsner selected several properties for mention in his guide to Essex, including a pair of semi detached houses on the corner of Galton Road and Chalkwell Avenue, and several properties in Imperial Avenue and Seymour Road.

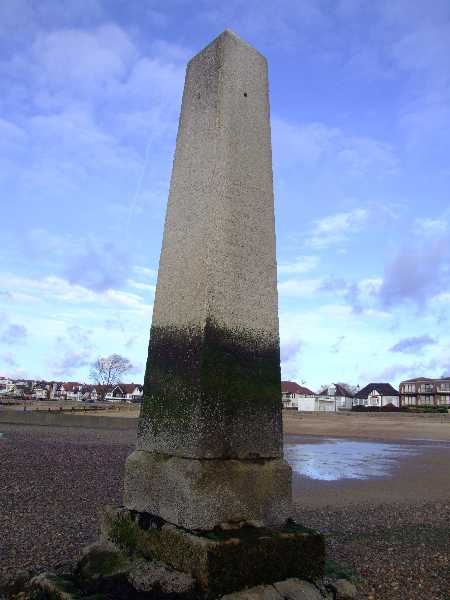
The Crow Stone

The Crow Stone (less often called London Stone) stands high on a plinth on the mud on the Thames Estuary foreshore facing the south end of Chalkwell Avenue. The line, known as the Yantlet Line, between the Crow Stone and the London Stone, Yantlet Creek, almost due south on the other shore of the Thames is the eastern limit of the jurisdiction of the Port of London Authority (PLA). This is relevant to local byelaws such as for a locally qualified maritime pilot into and out of port of larger vessels and the PLA's authority to police navigation (which also reserves the right to go in hot pursuit). It was designated as a Grade II listed building in July 2021. This is the third stone erected on the Chalkwell foreshore, the original being placed in 1285, before the replacement from 1755 was found to be cracked and was moved to Priory Park.

== Governance ==
Chalkwell is an electoral ward within the unitary authority of the Southend-on-Sea City Council. The ward forms part of the Southend West and Leigh constituency. As of January 2026, the MP for this constituency is David Burton-Sampson of the Labour Party, who took office in July 2024. It is represented by three local government councillors, each elected to serve a four-year term. As of January 2026, these currently are: James Courtenay (Conservative), Stephen Habermel (Conservative) and Nigel Folkard (Conservative). The latter also holds the position of Mayor, inaugurated as the 104th first citizen of the City in May 2025.

== Amenities ==
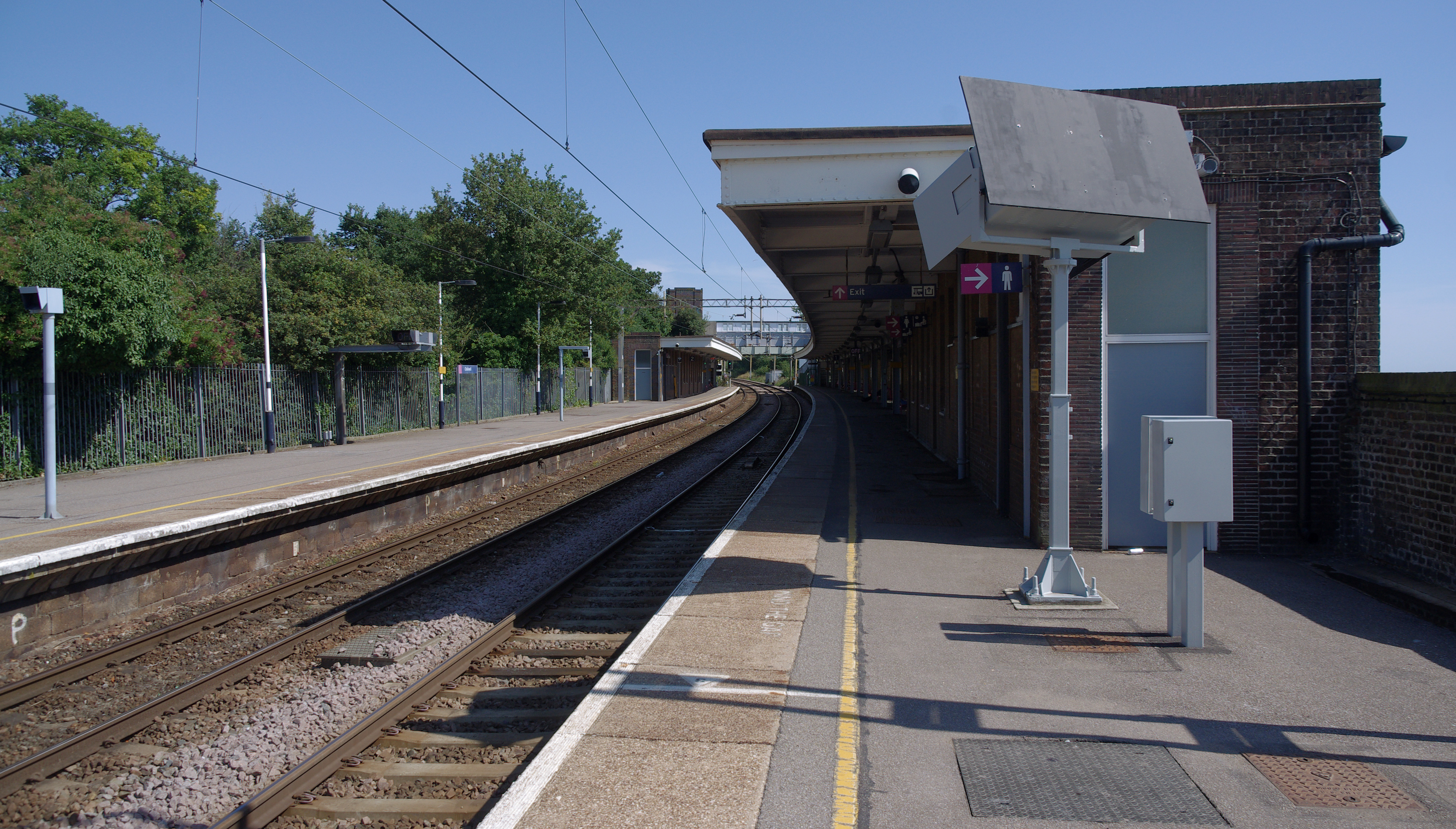
Chalkwell railway station

Chalkwell has a railway station on the c2c line, directly adjacent to Joscelyne's beach, with direct trains to London Fenchurch Street Station on average every 10 minutes.

Chalkwell Park has hosted Essex County Cricket Club matches and is the home ground for two local cricket clubs. Metal, the art organisation set up by Jude Kelly OBE has been based in Chalkwell Hall since 2006. The organisation offers residency space for artists and also organises the Village Green Art & Music Festival. The festival ran from 2008 for a weekend every July, but has not run since 2019 due to covid. The park is also home to NetPark, which claims to be the world’s first digital art park. The park is home to the annual fair that accompanies the Southend Carnival.

Chalkwell Beach was awarded a Seaside Award in 2021, an English award for the best beaches. Chalkwell is home to two bowls clubs, Chalkwell Bowls Club which is based on Chalkwell Esplanade, and the Essex County Bowls Club that is based in Imperial Avenue. In 2009, an open water swimming club, the "Chalkwell Redcaps" was established.

Chalkwell is home to an Aldi supermarket.

== Conservation Area ==
Southend-on-Sea Borough Council designated the Crowstone area of Chalkwell in 1990. The most prominent building in the conservation area is Crowstone House, built in 1905 and now a nursing home. The area is named after the North Eastern marker, the Crow Stone which marked the extent of power in history of the City of London and the Port of London Authority.

The only listed structure in Chalkwell is Chalkwell Hall, which has been Grade II listed since 1974.

== Demographics ==
Chalkwell compared
2021 UK Census	Chalkwell ward	Southend-on-Sea	England
Population	9,930	180,655	56,490,048
White	82.8%	82.61%	81.7%
Asian	6.4%	7.0%	9.3%
Black	2.3	2.3%	4.0%
Arab	0.2%	0.2%	0.6%
Mixed Race	5.7%	4.8%	2.9%
Other Ethnic Group	0.9%	0.9%	1.6%
Christian	42.7%	42.6%	46.3%
Muslim	2.6%	3.0%	6.5%
Hindu	1.0%	1.1%	1.7%
No religion	42.2%	44.9%	37.2%
Unemployed	3.1%	3.7%	3.5%
Retired	23.7%	22.5%	21.6%

At the 2011 UK census, the Chalkwell electoral ward had a population of 10,045, falling to 9,930 in the 2021 UK Census. The most common ethnic group was White with 82.8% of the population, followed by Asian with 6.4%, Mixed Race with 5.7%, Black with 2.3% and 0.9% identifying as Other. Christianity was the most common religion with 42.7% - closely followed by Atheism with 42.2%. Judaism (3.8%), Islam (2.6%), Hinduism (1.0%) and Sikhism (0.1%) followed, with 0.7% of the population identifying as having a different religion to those listed.

60.4% of Chalkwell's population (aged 16-74) were recorded as economically active (5,016); with 33.8% in full-time employment, 11.6% in part-time employment, 11.9% self-employed and 3.1% unemployed. Of the economically inactive, 23.7% were retired, 3% were students, 4.4% were looking after home or family (part of unpaid domestic work), 4.7% were long-term sick or disabled and 3.8% were economically active for other reasons.

The occupations most popular in Chalkwell were professional occupations at 22.9%, followed by managers and senior officials at 17%, associate professional and technical occupations at 16.4%, and administrative and secretarial positions at 10.9%. The remaining 32.7% of roles were fulfilled by other service occupations, skilled trade labourers, elementary occupations, sales and customer service, and process and plant operatives in descending order (ranging from 8.0% to 4.3%). Compared to the wider Southend figures, the ward had a relatively high proportion of professional roles and managerial roles (39.9% compared to 32.1%). Moreover, the ward sees higher levels of Level 4 qualifications (which includes the Certificate of higher education) and higher (up to Level 8, though there is no data for individual Levels above Level 3) than the Southend figures (34.3% compared to 27.2%). 18.2% of Chalkwell residents had no qualifications, 10% had Level 1 (for example GCSE grades 1 to 3), 14% had Level 2 (for example GCSE grades 4 to 9) and 16.5% had Level 3 qualifications (for example A-Levels).
