= Chalkwell Park =

Park in Southend-on-Sea, England

Coordinates: 51°32′42″N 0°40′27″E

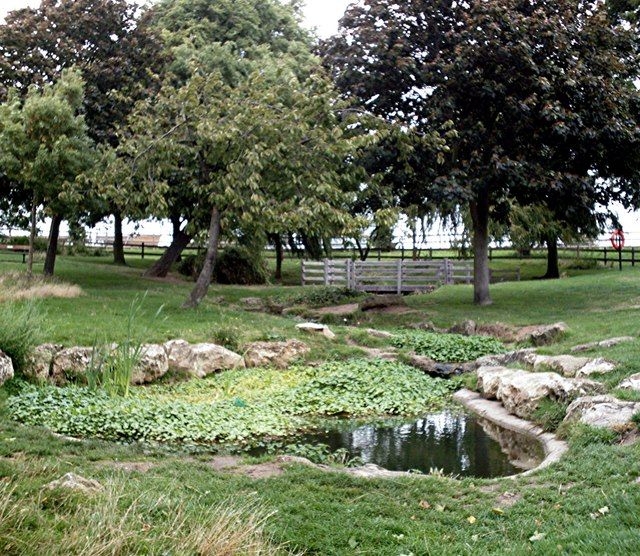

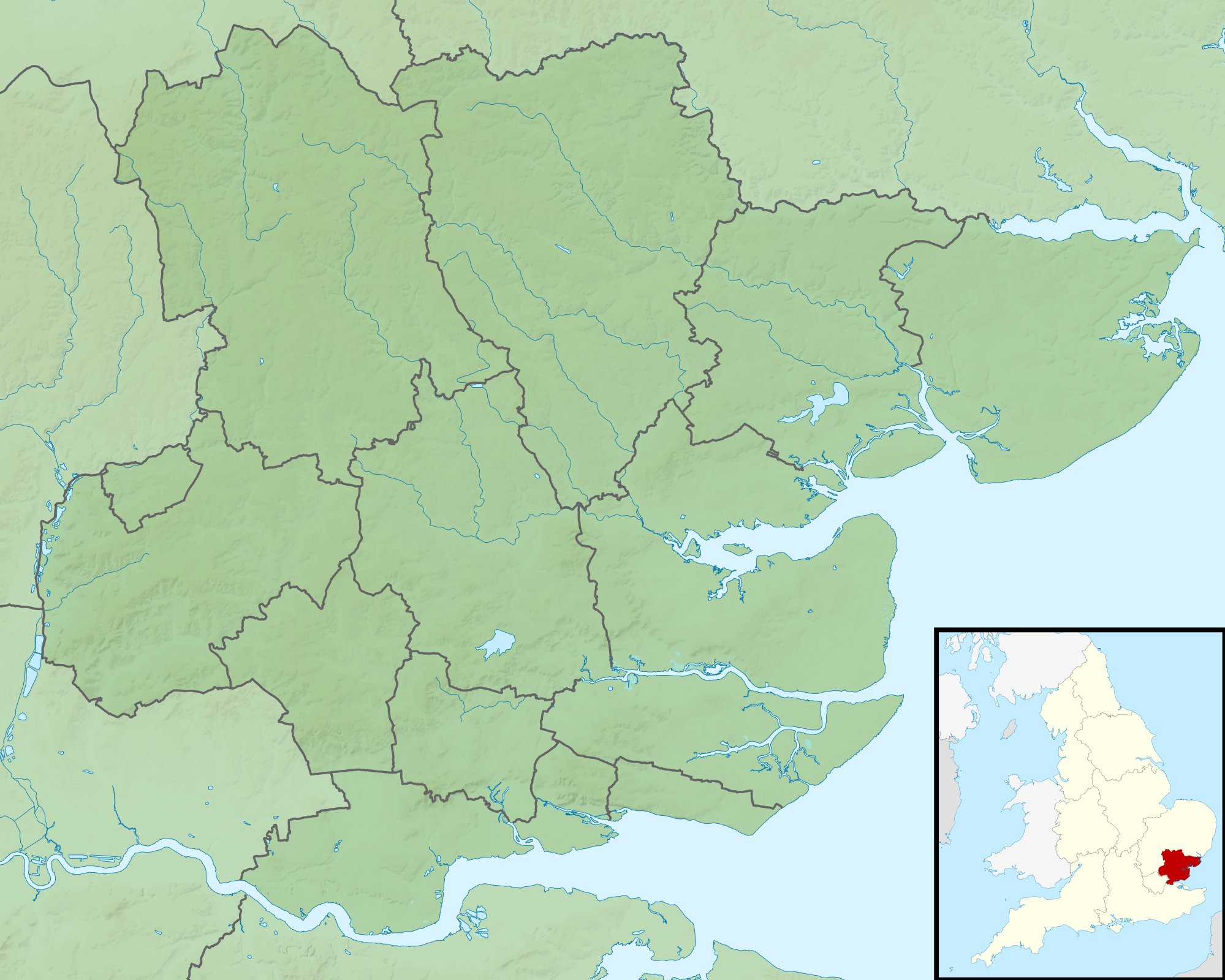
- Location within Essex
- Location: Chalkwell, Southend-on-Sea, Essex, England
- Area: 27 hectares (67 acres)

Chalkwell Park is a recreational park in Chalkwell, Southend-on-Sea, in Essex, England. It covers 27 hectares (67 acres) and contains several flower gardens, two children's playgrounds, a skateboard/BMX park and football, cricket, basketball and tennis fields. The cricket pitch was formerly used by Essex County Cricket Club.

The arts and music festival Village Green was held on the grounds of Chalkwell Park annually in the summer. The festival often received more than 25,000 visitors each year, but has not been run since 2019 due to the covid pandemic. The park is also home to NetPark, which claims to be the world’s first digital art park. The park is home to the annual fair that accompanies the Southend Carnival.

== History ==
Chalkwell as a suburb started in the early 20th century as a housing development on the former farmland of the Chalkwell Hall estate. The name is believed to be derived from chalk pits dug by farmers to neutralise acid soil. The current hall stands on the site of previous halls and was built in 1830. In 1903, Southend-on-Sea Borough Council purchased the land for £20,000 and opened a park.

A small garden of remembrance commemorating those who lost their lives during the Second World War was opened in the park on 30 April 1952.

In the 1950s or earlier, a small petting zoo was established in Chalkwell Hall containing at various points in time peacocks, monkeys and in the 1970s, a Himalayan black bear named Lulu. The last inhabitants were four peacocks in an enclosure which were eventually relocated to a private estate where there was more space. The hall also serves as a modern art house run by the charity, Metal.

Chalkwell Hall was designated as a Grade II listed building in 1974.

In June 2025, one child died and several others were seriously injured after a tree collapsed in the park.

== Cricket ground ==
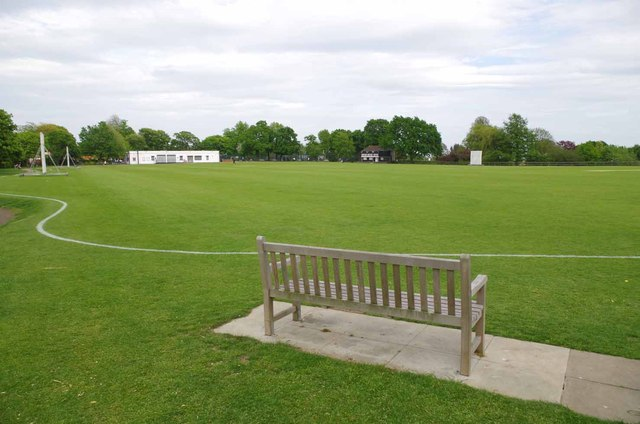
Chalkwell Park cricket ground in 2016

The cricket ground was first used by the Essex County Cricket Club, 1st XI in 1934 for County Championship matches and in 1970 for List A matches. The ground has not been used by the club 1st XI since 1976.

The ground has hosted 69 first-class matches and eight List A matches:

=== Game information ===
Game Type	No. of Games
County Championship Matches	65
limited-over county matches	8
Twenty20 matches	0

=== Game statistics – first-class ===
Category	Information
Highest team score	There have been no team scores exceeding 500 scored at this ground
Lowest team score	Somerset (48 against Essex) in 1961
Best batting performance	Tom Pearce (211 Runs for Essex against Leicestershire) in 1948
Best bowling performance	Derek Underwood (9/37 for Kent against Essex) in 1966

=== Game statistics – one-day matches ===
Category	Information
Highest team score	Essex (232/5 in 40 overs against Leicestershire) in 1976
Lowest team score	Middlesex (41 in 19.4 overs against Essex) in 1972
Best batting performance	Bob Cooke (83 Runs for Essex against Northamptonshire) in 1974
Best bowling performance	Allan Jones (6/34 for Somerset against Essex) in 1971

=== Club cricket ===
Chalkwell Park is home to Westcliff-on-Sea Cricket Club and Leigh-on-Sea Cricket Club. Westcliff-on-Sea have played there since 1907 and moved a pavilion to the ground in 1910. Leigh-on-Sea started out as Chalkwell Park Cricket Club and played their first match here in 1907 against South Benfleet. They built their first pavilion for the 1922 season and a later replacement that forms the core of their current building opened at the start of the 1954 season.
