= London Stone (riparian) =

Boundary stones beside the rivers Thames and Medway

Coordinates: 51°28′31″N 0°40′42″E

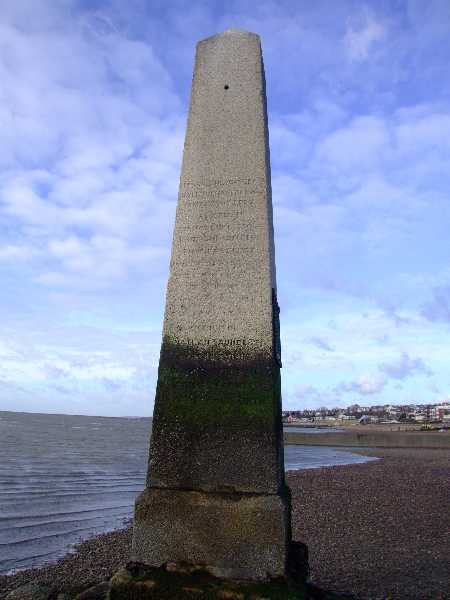
The London or 'Crow' Stone at Chalkwell, Southend, which formerly marked the seaward limit of the authority of the City of London.

London Stone is the name given to a number of boundary stones that stand beside the rivers Thames and Medway, which formerly marked the limits of jurisdiction (riparian water rights) of the City of London.

== History ==
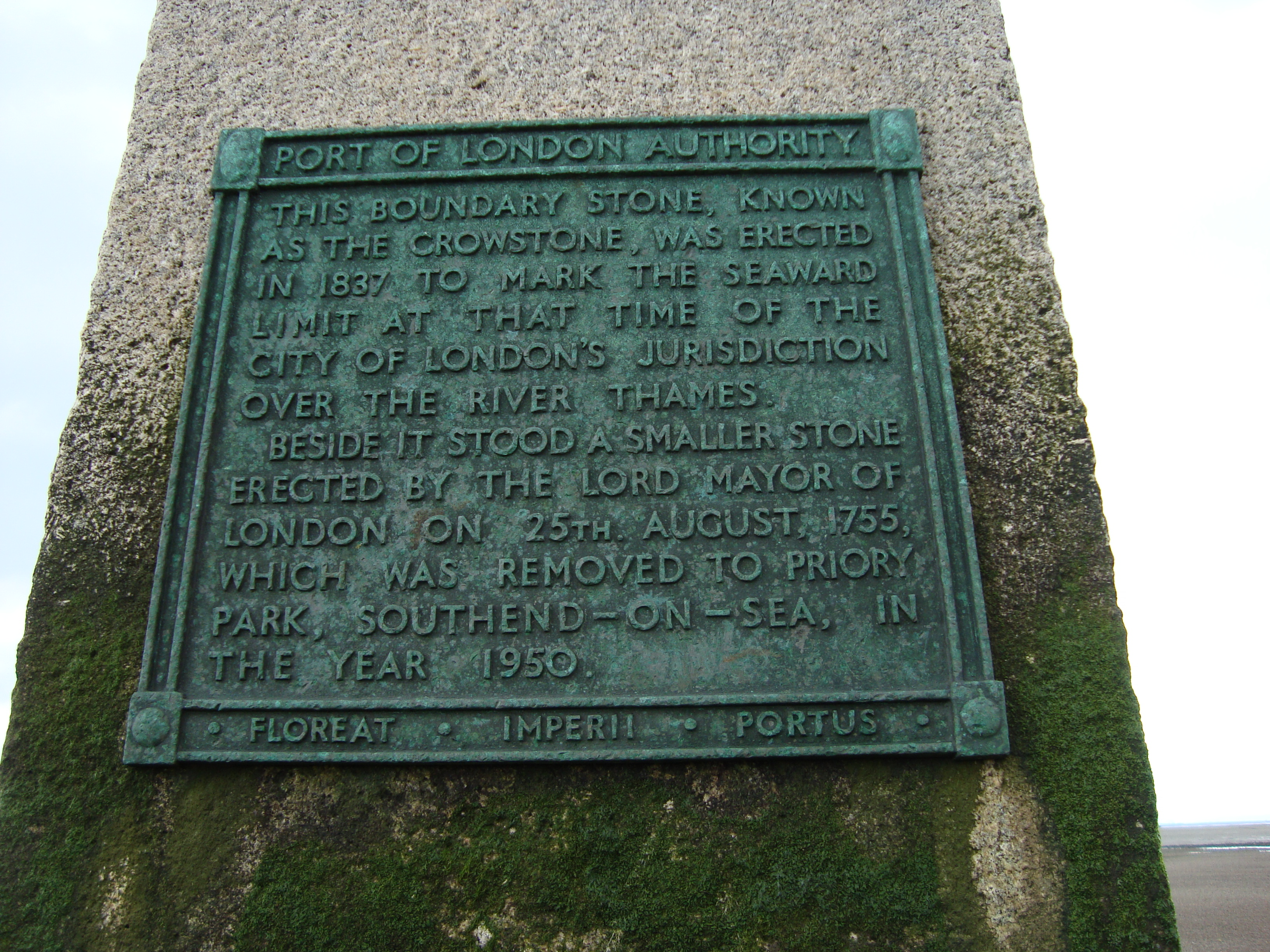
Plaque on the Crow Stone, Chalkwell

Until 1350, the English Crown held the right to fish the rivers of England and charged duties on those people it licensed to fish. In 1197 King Richard I, in need of money to finance his involvement in the Third Crusade, sold the rights over the lower reaches of the River Thames to the City of London. Marker stones were erected to indicate the limit of the City's rights.

In Victorian times, the Lord Mayor would come in procession by water and touch the Staines stone with a sword to re-affirm the City's rights.

Control of the river passed from the City to the Thames Conservancy, and then below Teddington to the Port of London Authority and above it to Thames Water Authority and finally the Environment Agency.

== Staines ==
In medieval times before the canalisation of the Thames, Staines, was the highest point at which the high tide was perceivable for a few minutes every semi-diurnal tide (twice a day), adding some millimetres to the water depth compared to more upstream parishes. This London Stone marked the upstream limit of the City's rights. The official role of a Corporation of London stone of 1285 beside Staines Bridge was set out with a grant of associated privileges in a charter of Edward I. Its use by the river is indicated by the indentations (on the right-hand face in the photo), caused by tow ropes of horse-drawn boats rubbing against the stone.

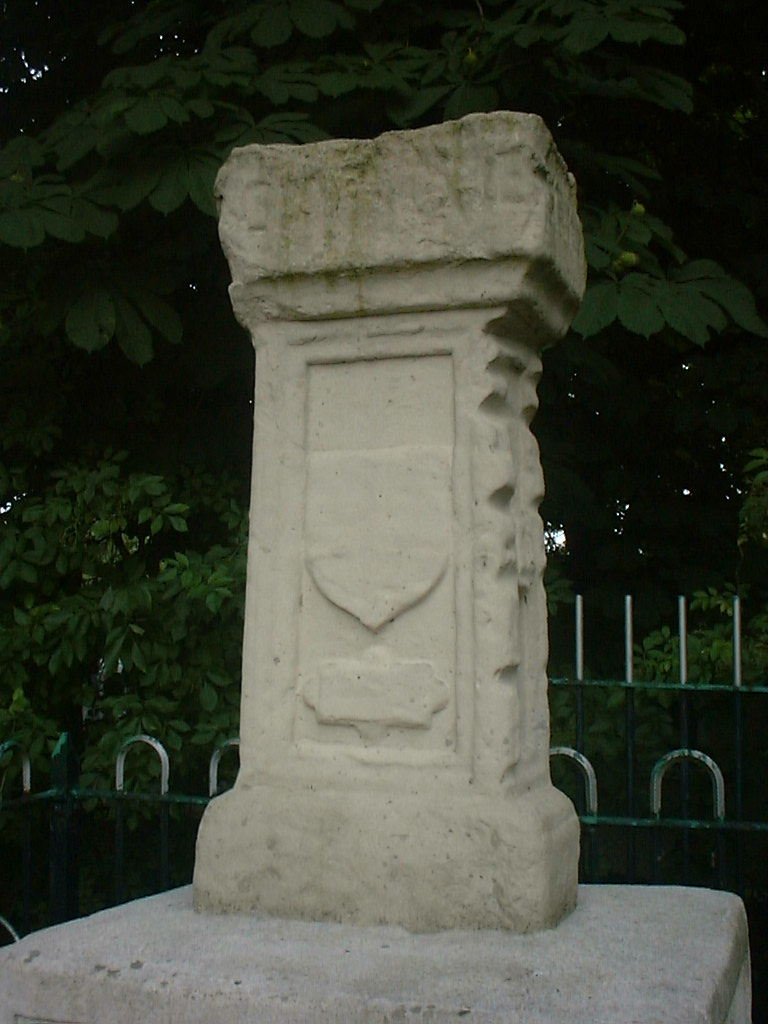
London Stone, Staines

=== Relocation within Staines and replica ===
Staines is on the point where the north bank moves from east to north and has always been its site but the exact position has changed.

1. In c. 1750 the approx. 0.6-metre-tall (2 ft 0 in) half cube on a tall stone pillar was moved about 500 metres (0.3 mi) upstream to a site at grid reference TQ028718 by the river in the Lammas Pleasure Ground.
2. In 1986 the stone was moved to the Old Town Hall Arts Centre, Market Square and a replica was placed in the Pleasure Ground.
3. In 2004 the original was moved to Spelthorne Museum, Spelthorne Library, Friends Walk/Thames Street.

=== Features ===
The stone has been recarved in its lower section making its long base narrower than its top. Its sole inscription is a very eroded etching 'STANE' in its top section of uncertain date, the Old English word for Stone (as in Stane Street). If the inscription is old enough this reinforces the traditional spelling, if not the pronunciation (as with Stane Street) of the name of the town, for which see Great Vowel Shift. It is possible that there was more than one such stone, explaining the Anglo Saxon name of the town, which was established many centuries after the Romans noted they called their staging post at the bridge, Ad Pontes. The lower carved area has a shield in relief as is its motif section below with eroded inscriptions. It stands on a much wider plinth inscribed with the names of various City worthies who may have been involved in its 1750 move.

The replica, due to its location, is in the lowest category of architecture, a Grade II listed structure partly achieved since it happens to stand on the point of one of the former coal-tax posts. Martin Nail included the Stone as No. 83 in his list of London boundary marks.

== Yantlet line ==
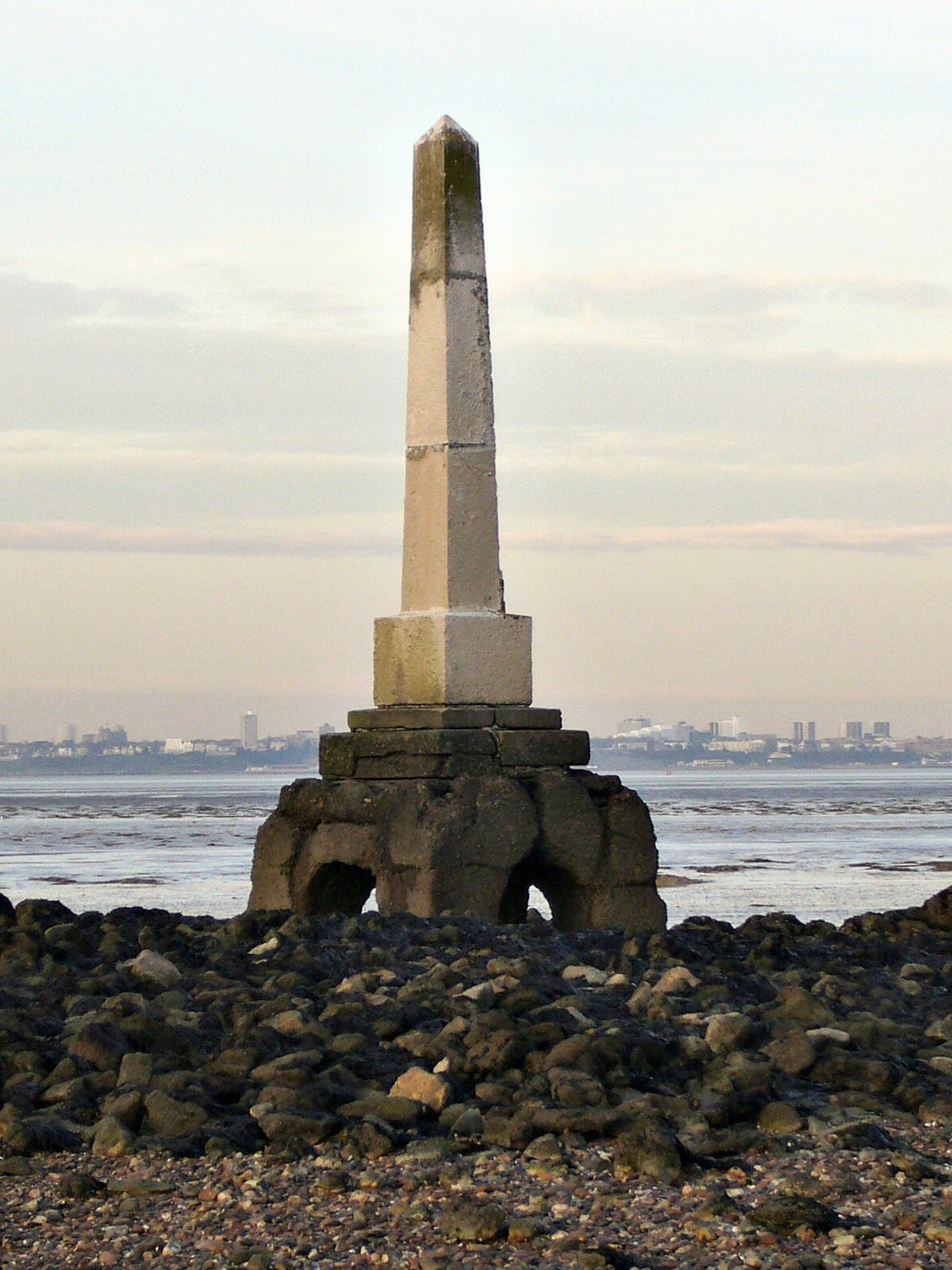
London Stone, Yantlet Creek

The historic downstream limit of the City's rights is about 33.5 miles (54 km) as the crow flies from London Bridge and is marked on both banks of the Thames: by the Crow Stone to the north and by the London Stone to the south. The line between the Crow Stone and the London Stone, Yantlet Creek is known as the Yantlet Line.

=== London Stone (Yantlet) ===
On the south bank, the marker is the London Stone which stands at grid reference TQ860786 beside the mouth of Yantlet Creek on the Isle of Grain.

The overall height of the monument is about 8 metres. The main column has an inscription, now illegible. The plinth on which it stands has an inscription listing various worthy gentlemen who were probably involved in the re-erection of the stone in Victorian times. They include Horatio Thomas Austin and Warren Stormes Hale, sometime Lord Mayor and founder of the City of London School.

=== Crow Stone ===
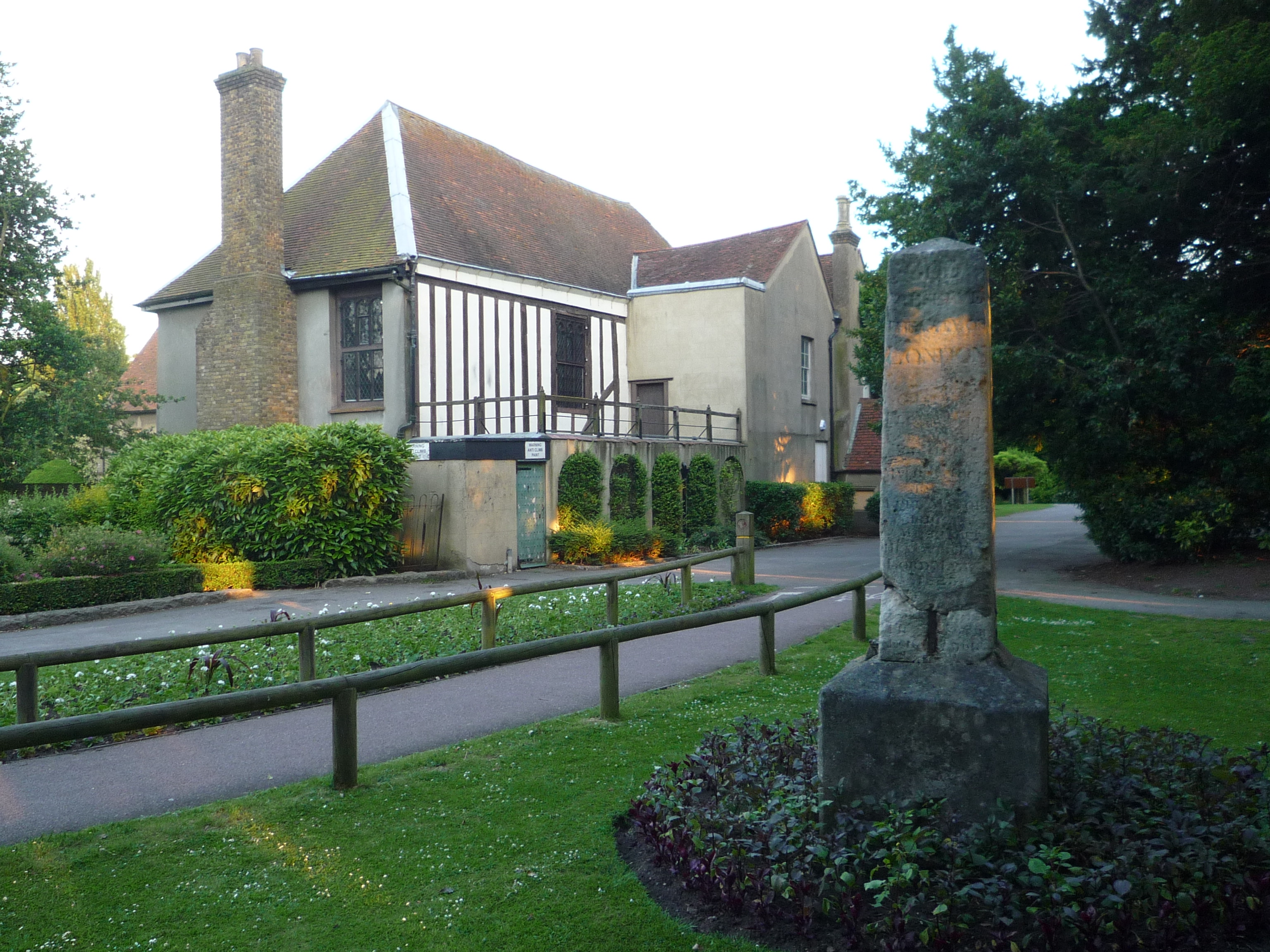
The original Crow Stone from 1775, removed in 1837. It now stands in front of Prittlewell Priory in Southend-on-Sea, a few miles inland from its original location

The marker on the north bank is almost due north of Yantlet Creek and is called the Crow Stone (also known as Crowstone or City Stone). It stands at grid reference TQ857852 on the mud opposite the end of Chalkwell Avenue, Southend-on-Sea (two nearby roads are called Crowstone Avenue and Crowstone Road). It was erected in 1837 and replaced a smaller stone, dating from 1755. The older stone was removed to Priory Park in Southend, where it remains today. It is likely that there has been a marker on this site and at Yantlet since 1285. The Old Crowstone (as it is named in the official listing entry) was designated as a listed building at Grade II in 1974. The new Crow Stone was listed at Grade II in 2021.

== Upnor ==
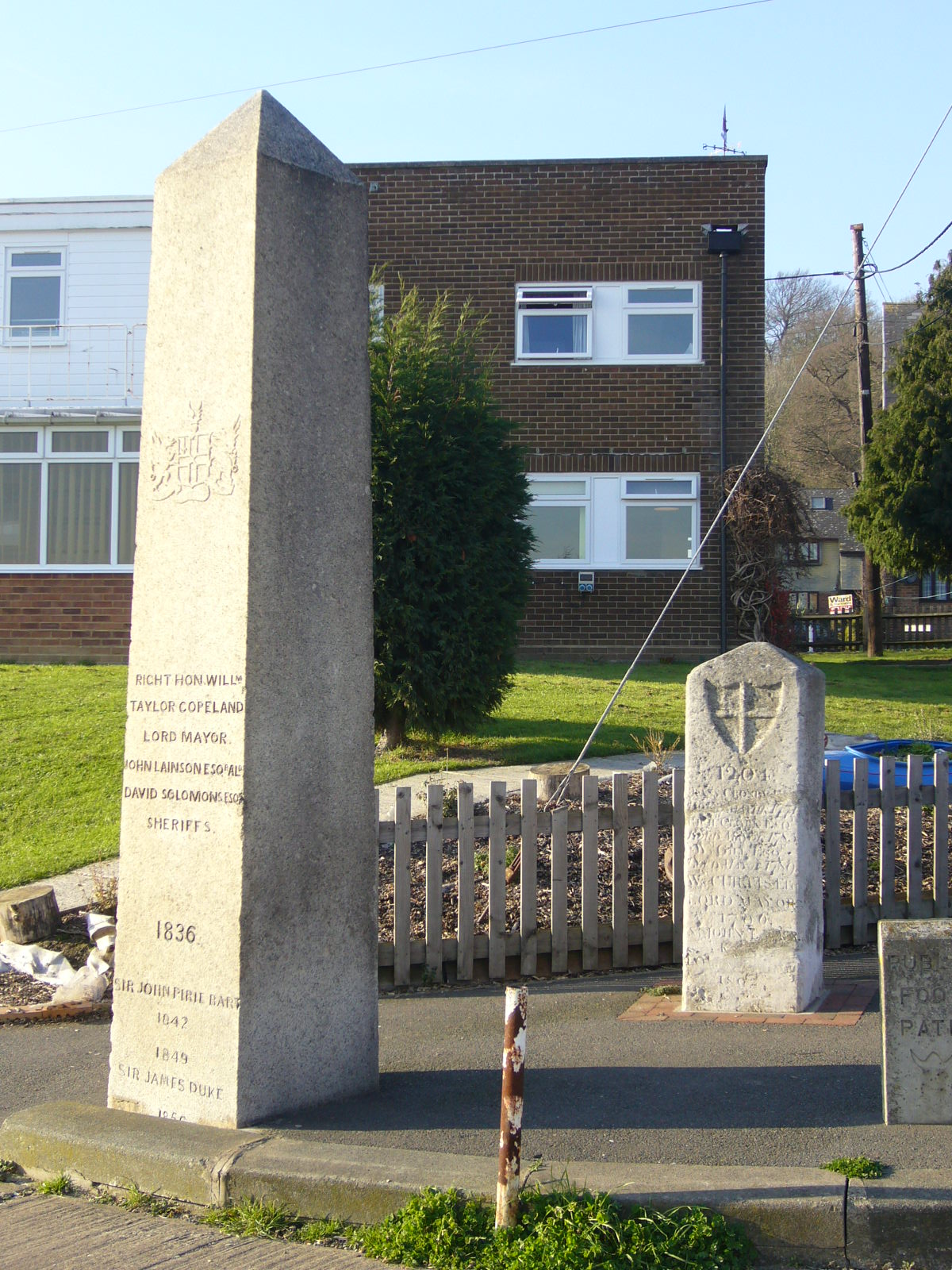
London Stones, Lower Upnor, Kent

Two London Stones stand at grid reference TQ762712, between the Arethusa Venture Centre and the River Medway in Lower Upnor, Kent. The older, smaller stone was erected in the eighteenth century, and bears the date 1204 as part of its main inscription. It carries on its rear the words "God preserve the City of London". Apart from that, the inscriptions of both stones are merely the names of various lord mayors and years. They mark the limit of the charter rights of London fishermen.

== See also ==
- List of individual rocks
