= 2000 Southend-on-Sea Borough Council election =

2000 UK local government election

- 4 May 2000

14 out of 39 seats to Southend-on-Sea Borough Council 20 seats needed for a majority

	First party	Second party	Third party
Party	Conservative	Liberal Democrats	Labour
Seats won	12	2	0
Seats after	25	9	5
Seat change	▲6	▼3	▼3
Popular vote	21,567	8,625	6,564
Percentage	57.4%	23.0%	17.5%
Swing	▲11.2%	▼0.9%	▼11.7%
- Winner of each seat at the 2000 Southend-on-Sea Borough Council election.
Council control before election
No overall control
Council control after election
Conservative

The 2000 Southend-on-Sea Council election took place on 4 May 2000 to elect members of Southend-on-Sea Unitary Council in Essex, England. One third of the council was up for election and the Conservative party gained overall control of the council from no overall control.

== Campaign ==
Before the election the council was run by a coalition between the Liberal Democrat and Labour parties, but the election was expected to see the Conservatives take control from them. 14 of the 39 seats were being contested, with the Conservatives only needing to gain one seat in order to have a majority. They only required a tiny swing to achieve this, which would give the Conservatives control of the council for the first time in 8 years. The election was a high-profile one with the Conservative leader, William Hague, campaigning in the area on the Monday before the election.

A major issue in the election was the number of refugees in the town, which was estimated at up to 2,000. The Conservatives said that the area had become a "dumping ground" and called on all asylum seekers to be detained upon entry into the country. However Labour accused the Conservatives of "playing the race card" and reported a Conservative leaflet to the Commission for Racial Equality.

Other issues included Conservative plans to build a new bypass to ease traffic within the town. Meanwhile, the Liberal Democrat and Labour parties defended their record of investing £50 million in the town during their period in control of the council, while keeping council tax rises down, with the latest council tax level the second lowest in Essex.

== Election result ==
The results saw the Conservatives gain control of the council with an 11-seat majority after winning over 57% of the vote. They gained 3 seats each from both Labour and the Liberal Democrats with defeated councillors including 3 members of the executive, Nigel Baker, Stephen George and Chris Mallam. These defeats meant that Labour failed to hold any of the seats they had been defending, while the Liberal Democrats only managed to hold on to 2 seats. Overall turnout in the election was just above the national average at 30%.

Following the election Charles Latham became the new Conservative leader of the council and announced they would scrap planned bus lanes and abolish charges for social care services.

2000 Southend-on-Sea Borough Council election
Party	This election			Full council			This election		
Party	Seats	Net	Seats %	Other	Total	Total %	Votes	Votes %	+/−
Conservative	12	▲6	85.7	13	25	64.1	21,567	57.4	+11.2
Liberal Democrats	2	▼3	14.3	7	9	23.1	8,625	23.0	–0.9
Labour	0	▼3	0.0	5	5	12.8	6,564	17.5	–11.7
UKIP	0	Steady	0.0	0	0	0.0	579	1.5	N/A
Independent	0	Steady	0.0	0	0	0.0	146	0.4	N/A
Green	0	Steady	0.0	0	0	0.0	78	0.2	N/A

== Ward results ==
=== Belfairs ===
Belfairs
Party	Candidate	Votes	%	±%
Conservative	Howard Briggs*	2,337	69.1	+10.7
Liberal Democrats	Colin Ritchie	713	21.1	−6.4
Labour	Charles Willis	331	9.8	−4.3
Majority		1,624	48.0	+17.1
Turnout		3,381	37.4	−0.7
Registered electors		9,051		
Conservative hold		Swing	▲8.6	

=== Blenheim ===
Blenheim
Party	Candidate	Votes	%	±%
Conservative	Peter Collins	1,367	46.6	+7.4
Liberal Democrats	Christopher Mallam*	1,010	34.4	−6.2
Labour	Teresa Merrison	324	11.0	−9.2
UKIP	David Stephens	233	7.9	N/A
Majority		357	12.2	N/A
Turnout		2,934	32.3	+3.6
Registered electors		9,085		
Conservative gain from Liberal Democrats		Swing	▲6.8	

=== Chalkwell ===
Chalkwell
Party	Candidate	Votes	%	±%
Conservative	Lesley Salter*	1,633	60.0	+5.6
Liberal Democrats	Roger Fisher	623	22.9	−5.9
Labour	Ruth Jarvis	285	10.5	−6.3
UKIP	David Cooper-Walker	179	6.6	N/A
Majority		1,010	37.1	+11.4
Turnout		2,720	28.3	+0.3
Registered electors		9,640		
Conservative hold		Swing	▲5.8	

=== Eastwood ===
Eastwood
Party	Candidate	Votes	%	±%
Conservative	Roger Weaver*	1,997	63.4	+13.9
Liberal Democrats	Mervyn Howell	818	26.0	−8.0
Labour	Denis Garne	334	10.6	−5.9
Majority		1,179	37.4	+21.9
Turnout		3,149	29.8	−0.1
Registered electors		10,583		
Conservative hold		Swing	▲11.0	

=== Leigh ===
Leigh
Party	Candidate	Votes	%	±%
Liberal Democrats	Peter Wrexham*	1,515	46.8	+9.3
Conservative	Joyce Lambert	1,356	41.9	+1.6
Labour	Jane Norman	197	6.1	−8.3
UKIP	Melvyn Smith	167	5.2	N/A
Majority		159	4.9	N/A
Turnout		3,235	35.2	+1.4
Registered electors		9,198		
Liberal Democrats hold		Swing	▲3.9	

=== Milton ===
Milton
Party	Candidate	Votes	%	±%
Conservative	Jonathan Garston	1,096	50.4	+5.8
Labour	Stephen George*	782	36.0	–9.7
Liberal Democrats	Amanda Smith	150	6.9	–2.8
Independent	Patricia Clark	146	6.7	N/A
Majority		314	14.4	N/A
Turnout		2,174	25.2	+1.3
Conservative gain from Labour		Swing	▲7.8	

=== Prittlewell ===
Prittlewell (2)
Party	Candidate	Votes	%	±%
Conservative	Christopher Kerr	1,638	56.8	+18.8
Conservative	Anna Waite	1,557	54.0	+16.0
Liberal Democrats	Nigel Baker*	975	33.8	–4.5
Liberal Democrats	Stephen Newton	902	31.3	–7.0
Labour	Sylvia Groom	357	12.4	–11.3
Labour	Anne Chalk	342	11.9	–11.8
Turnout		5,771	33.1	+6.3
Registered electors		8,976		
Conservative gain from Liberal Democrats				
Conservative gain from Liberal Democrats				

=== St Lukes ===
St Lukes
Party	Candidate	Votes	%	±%
Conservative	Melvyn Day	780	48.4	+14.0
Labour	Joyce Mapp*	627	38.9	−15.9
Liberal Democrats	Michael Clark	126	7.8	−3.1
Green	Adrian Hedges	78	4.8	N/A
Majority		153	9.5	N/A
Turnout		1,611	19.1	−0.7
Registered electors		8,458		
Conservative gain from Labour		Swing	▲15.0	

=== Shoebury ===
Shoebury
Party	Candidate	Votes	%	±%
Conservative	Anthony North*	2,282	68.8	+15.8
Labour	Peter Griffiths	802	24.2	−13.9
Liberal Democrats	Granville Stride	232	7.0	−1.9
Majority		1,480	44.6	+29.7
Turnout		3,316	22.3	−0.5
Registered electors		14,939		
Conservative hold		Swing	▲14.9	

=== Southchurch ===
Southchurch
Party	Candidate	Votes	%	±%
Conservative	Ann Holland*	1,882	75.6	+12.3
Labour	Colin Van-Assen	397	16.0	−11.1
Liberal Democrats	Michael Woolcott	209	8.4	−1.1
Majority		1,485	59.7	+23.5
Turnout		2,488	28.3	+2.1
Registered electors		8,832		
Conservative hold		Swing	▲11.7	

=== Thorpe ===
Thorpe
Party	Candidate	Votes	%	±%
Conservative	Anthony Delaney	2,059	76.5	+8.0
Labour	John Townsend	409	15.2	−6.2
Liberal Democrats	Linda Smith	224	8.3	−1.7
Majority		1,650	61.3	+14.2
Turnout		2,692	27.1	+2.8
Registered electors		9,962		
Conservative hold		Swing	▲7.1	

=== Victoria ===
Victoria
Party	Candidate	Votes	%	±%
Conservative	Paul Jones	922	45.9	+16.5
Labour	David Norman	870	43.3	−15.9
Liberal Democrats	Robert Howes	217	10.8	−0.6
Majority		52	2.6	N/A
Turnout		2,009	21.8	−0.3
Registered electors		9,243		
Conservative gain from Labour		Swing	▲16.2	

=== Westborough ===
Westborough
Party	Candidate	Votes	%	±%
Liberal Democrats	Mary Lubel*	911	43.8	+2.6
Conservative	Michael Samuel	661	31.8	+14.0
Labour	Raymond Hales	507	24.4	−16.6
Majority		250	12.0	+11.8
Turnout		2,079	24.3	−5.0
Registered electors		8,590		
Liberal Democrats hold		Swing	▼5.7	
