= 2003 Southend-on-Sea Borough Council election =

2003 UK local government election

- 1 May 2003

17 out of 51 seats to Southend-on-Sea Borough Council 26 seats needed for a majority

	First party	Second party
Party	Conservative	Labour
Seats won	10	3
Seats after	32	10
Seat change	▼1	▼1
Popular vote	14,795	5,767
Percentage	47.8%	18.6%
Swing	▲1.5%	▼2.4%
	Third party	Fourth party
Party	Liberal Democrats	Independent
Seats won	3	1
Seats after	8	1
Seat change	▲1	▲1
Popular vote	8,672	706
Percentage	28.0%	2.3%
Swing	▲6.7%	▼7.2%
- Winner of each seat at the 2003 Southend-on-Sea Borough Council election.
Council control before election
Conservative
Council control after election
Conservative

The 2003 Southend-on-Sea Borough Council election took place on 1 May 2003 to elect members of Southend-on-Sea Borough Council in Essex, England. One third of the council was up for election and the Conservative party stayed in overall control of the council.

== Summary ==
The results saw the Conservatives keep control of the council with a slightly reduced majority of 13 seats. The only changes saw the Conservatives lose one seat to the Liberal Democrats in St Laurence ward and an independent candidate gain Westborough from the Labour party.

=== Election result ===
2003 Southend-on-Sea Borough Council election
Party	This election			Full council			This election		
Party	Seats	Net	Seats %	Other	Total	Total %	Votes	Votes %	+/−
Conservative	10	▼1	58.8	22	32	62.7	14,795	47.8	+1.5
Labour	3	▼1	17.6	7	10	19.6	5,767	18.6	–2.4
Liberal Democrats	3	▲1	17.6	5	8	15.7	8,672	28.0	+6.7
Independent	1	▲1	5.9	0	1	2.0	706	2.3	–7.2
Green	0	Steady	0.0	0	0	0.0	754	2.4	+0.5
BNP	0	Steady	0.0	0	0	0.0	249	0.8	N/A

== Ward results ==
=== Belfairs ===
Belfairs
Party	Candidate	Votes	%	±%
Conservative	Julie Cushion*	1,113	50.5	+0.2
Liberal Democrats	Michael Grimwade	860	39.0	+9.2
Labour	Tony Borton	230	10.4	−0.7
Majority		253	11.5	−9.0
Turnout		2,203	30.3	−3.9
Registered electors		7,289		
Conservative hold		Swing	▼4.5	

=== Blenheim Park ===
Blenheim Park
Party	Candidate	Votes	%	±%
Liberal Democrats	James Clinkscales*	888	44.0	−1.7
Conservative	Ian Robertson	835	41.3	+3.4
Labour	Charles Willis	297	14.7	−1.8
Majority		53	2.6	−5.2
Turnout		2,020	27.0	−1.9
Registered electors		7,498		
Liberal Democrats hold		Swing	▲2.6	

=== Chalkwell ===
Chalkwell
Party	Candidate	Votes	%	±%
Conservative	Charles Latham*	1,155	62.2	+2.4
Liberal Democrats	Richard Gage	435	23.4	+4.8
Labour	Lydia Sookias	266	14.3	+0.5
Majority		720	38.8	−2.4
Turnout		1,856	25.9	−1.9
Registered electors		7,217		
Conservative hold		Swing	▼1.2	

=== Eastwood Park ===
Eastwood Park
Party	Candidate	Votes	%	±%
Conservative	Roger Weaver*	1,078	51.3	+2.1
Liberal Democrats	Norah Goodman	841	40.0	+6.7
Labour	Raoul Meade	184	8.7	−0.5
Majority		237	11.3	−4.6
Turnout		2,103	28.0	−5.7
Registered electors		7,529		
Conservative hold		Swing	▼2.3	

=== Kursaal ===
Kursaal
Party	Candidate	Votes	%	±%
Labour	Stephen George*	644	51.5	+1.8
Conservative	Judith Smithson	383	30.6	−4.5
Liberal Democrats	George Lewin	224	17.9	+2.7
Majority		261	20.9	+6.3
Turnout		1,251	18.5	−0.4
Registered electors		6,834		
Labour hold		Swing	▲3.2	

=== Leigh ===
Leigh
Party	Candidate	Votes	%	±%
Liberal Democrats	Peter Wexham*	1,335	61.2	+15.8
Conservative	Simon Gutteridge	573	26.3	−7.7
Green	Dawn Arno	138	6.3	N/A
Labour	Helen Beckett	134	6.1	−3.0
Majority		762	35.0	+23.6
Turnout		2,180	31.1	−2.1
Registered electors		7,034		
Liberal Democrats hold		Swing	▲11.8	

=== Milton ===
Milton
Party	Candidate	Votes	%	±%
Conservative	Jonathan Garston*	785	52.1	−2.2
Labour	Ian Gilbert	403	26.7	−8.0
Liberal Democrats	Michael Clark	201	13.3	+13.3
Green	Steve Flynn	118	7.8	−3.2
Majority		382	25.3	+5.6
Turnout		1,507	22.2	−5.3
Registered electors		6,808		
Conservative hold		Swing	▲2.9	

=== Prittlewell ===
Prittlewell
Party	Candidate	Votes	%	±%
Conservative	Murray Foster*	962	47.3	+14.2
Liberal Democrats	John Adams	695	34.2	+5.2
Labour	Margaret Borton	245	12.1	−2.3
Green	Andrea Black	131	6.4	N/A
Majority		267	13.1	+9.0
Turnout		2,033	27.0	−7.0
Registered electors		7,550		
Conservative hold		Swing	▲4.5	

=== St Laurence ===
St Laurence
Party	Candidate	Votes	%	±%
Liberal Democrats	Carole Roast	925	47.8	+18.2
Conservative	Michael Dolby*	738	38.1	+6.6
Labour	Paul White	272	14.1	+1.3
Majority		187	9.7	N/A
Turnout		1,935	26.2	−7.5
Registered electors		7,432		
Liberal Democrats gain from Conservative		Swing	▲5.8	

=== St Lukes ===
St Lukes
Party	Candidate	Votes	%	±%
Labour	Kevin Robinson*	590	42.9	−7.5
Conservative	Melvyn Day	525	38.2	+0.9
Liberal Democrats	Marion Boulton	155	11.3	N/A
Green	Cristian Ramis	105	7.6	−4.8
Majority		65	4.7	−8.4
Turnout		1,375	18.0	−3.9
Registered electors		7,693		
Labour hold		Swing	▼4.2	

=== Shoeburyness ===
Shoeburyness
Party	Candidate	Votes	%	±%
Conservative	Patricia Rayner*	810	56.7	+19.0
Labour	Anne Chalk	472	33.0	+6.3
Liberal Democrats	Colin Spraggs	147	10.3	+4.6
Majority		338	23.7	+15.9
Turnout		1,429	19.6	−4.9
Registered electors		7,294		
Conservative hold		Swing	▲6.4	

=== Southchurch ===
Southchurch
Party	Candidate	Votes	%	±%
Conservative	Ann Holland*	1,258	71.8	+11.1
Labour	Darius Ware-Lane	264	15.1	−1.6
Liberal Democrats	Timothy Ray	229	13.1	+4.9
Majority		994	56.8	+12.8
Turnout		1,751	24.8	−5.1
Registered electors		7,116		
Conservative hold		Swing	▲6.4	

=== Thorpe ===
Thorpe
Party	Candidate	Votes	%	±%
Conservative	Anthony Delaney*	1,456	75.1	−0.4
Labour	John Townsend	248	12.8	−2.0
Liberal Democrats	Linda Smith	235	12.1	+2.4
Majority		1,208	62.3	+1.6
Turnout		1,939	27.3	−5.2
Registered electors		7,136		
Conservative hold		Swing	▲0.8	

=== Victoria ===
Victoria
Party	Candidate	Votes	%	±%
Labour	David Norman*	667	45.8	−11.5
Conservative	Anthony Smithson	308	21.1	−12.2
BNP	Graham John	249	17.1	N/A
Liberal Democrats	Paul Collins	142	9.7	N/A
Green	Adrian Hedges	91	6.2	−3.2
Majority		359	24.6	+0.6
Turnout		1,457	21.9	−0.8
Registered electors		6,663		
Labour hold		Swing	▼0.4	

=== West Leigh ===
West Leigh
Party	Candidate	Votes	%	±%
Conservative	Howard Briggs*	1,417	57.4	−3.8
Liberal Democrats	Albert Wren	821	33.2	+1.5
Labour	Joyce Mapp	118	4.8	−2.3
Green	Doris Thomas	114	4.6	+4.6
Majority		596	24.1	−5.5
Turnout		2,470	36.2	−4.3
Registered electors		6,850		
Conservative hold		Swing	▼2.7	

=== West Shoebury ===
West Shoebury
Party	Candidate	Votes	%	±%
Conservative	Derek Jarvis*	1,173	69.0	+5.2
Labour	Julian Ware-Lane	340	20.0	−7.9
Liberal Democrats	Amanda Spraggs	187	11.0	+2.7
Majority		833	49.0	+13.0
Turnout		1,700	23.3	−5.0
Registered electors		7,337		
Conservative hold		Swing	▲6.6	

=== Westborough ===
Westborough
Party	Candidate	Votes	%	±%
Independent	Martin Terry	640	36.9	+11.4
Labour	Marimuthu Velmurugan*	393	22.7	−4.3
Liberal Democrats	Colin Ritchie	352	20.3	−3.4
Conservative	Emma Hill	226	13.0	−4.6
Independent	Trevor Oakley	66	3.8	N/A
Green	Rita Wood	57	3.3	−2.8
Majority		247	14.2	N/A
Turnout		1,734	25.1	−0.2
Registered electors		6,933		
Independent gain from Labour		Swing	▲7.9	
