= 2018 Southend-on-Sea Borough Council election =

2018 UK local government election

2018 Southend-on-Sea Borough Council
- 3 May 2018

17 out of 51 seats to Southend-on-Sea Borough Council 26 seats needed for a majority
- Turnout: 32.2%
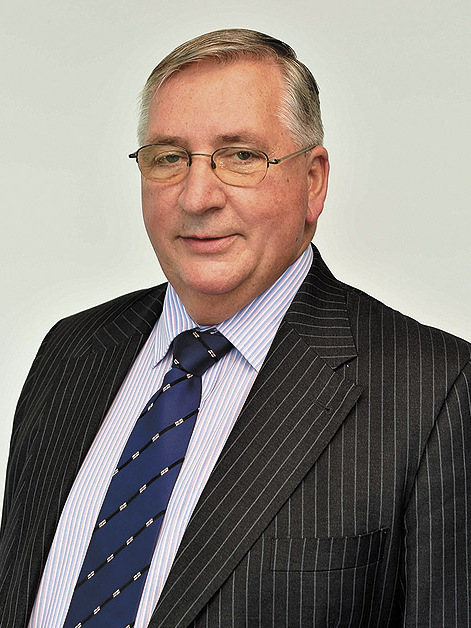

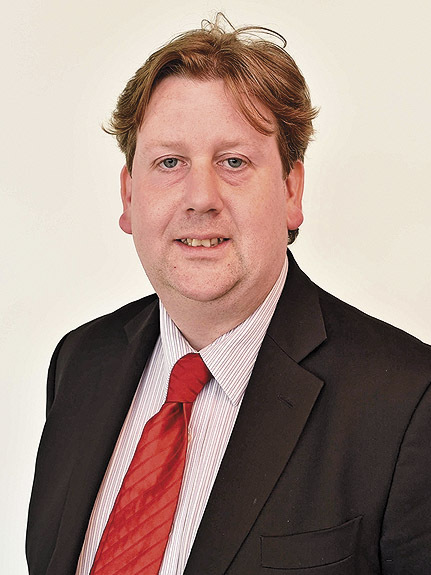

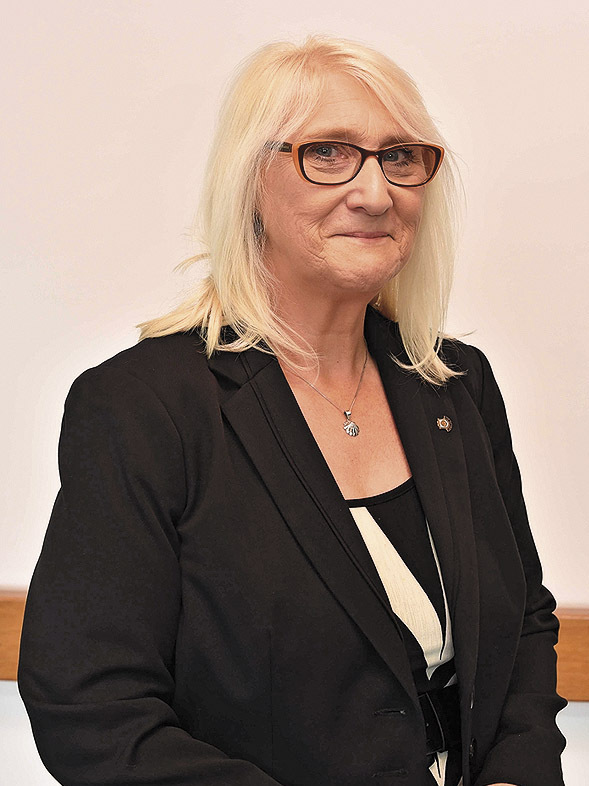
	First party	Second party
Leader	John Lamb	Ian Gilbert
Party	Conservative	Labour
Leader since	25 May 2014	Oct/Nov 2010
Leader's seat	West Leigh	Victoria
Last election	24 seats, 30.6%	10 seats, 19.0%
Seats before	28	9
Seats won	8	5
Seats after	29	11
Seat change	▲1	▲2
Popular vote	15,658	11,412
Percentage	37.0%	27.0%
Swing	▲6.4%	▲8.0%
	Third party	Fourth party
	Ind
Leader	n/a	Carole Mulroney
Party	Independent	Liberal Democrats
Leader since	n/a	May 2017
Leader's seat	n/a	Leigh
Last election	13 seats, 21.0%	2 seats, %
Seats before	12	2
Seats won	3	1
Seats after	9	2
Seat change	▼3	Steady
Popular vote	8,269	5,357
Percentage	19.5%	12.7%
Swing	▼1.5%	▲2.3%
- Map showing the results of the 2018 Southend-on-Sea Borough Council election

Leader before election
John Lamb
Conservative
Leader after election
John Lamb
Conservative

The 2018 Southend-on-Sea Borough Council election took place on 3 May 2018 to elect members to Southend-on-Sea Borough Council in Essex, England. This was on the same day as other local elections across the United Kingdom.

== Composition ==
Directly after the 2016 election the composition of the council was:

↓
13	10	2	2	24
Ind	Labour	Lib Dem	UKIP	Conservative

Prior to the election the composition of the council was:

↓
12	9	2	28
Ind	Labour	Lib Dem	Conservative

After the election, the composition of the council was:

↓
11	9	2	29
Labour	Ind	Lib Dem	Conservative

== Summary ==
=== Election result ===
2018 Southend-on-Sea Borough Council election
Party	This election			Full council			This election		
Party	Seats	Net	Seats %	Other	Total	Total %	Votes	Votes %	+/−
Conservative	8	▲1	47.1	21	29	56.9	15,658	37.0	+6.4
Labour	5	▲2	29.4	6	11	21.6	11,412	27.0	+8.0
Independent	3	▼3	17.6	6	9	17.6	8,269	19.5	–1.5
Liberal Democrats	1	Steady	5.9	1	2	3.9	5,357	12.7	+2.3
Green	0	Steady	0.0	0	0	0.0	1,184	2.8	–1.5
UKIP	0	Steady	0.0	0	0	0.0	390	0.9	–13.8
Psychedelic Future	0	Steady	0.0	0	0	0.0	42	<0.1	N/A

== Ward results ==
=== Belfairs ===
Belfairs
Party	Candidate	Votes	%	±%
Conservative	Alan Dear	1,329	50.4	+11.2
Independent	Stephen McKiernan	445	16.3	–24.7
Labour	Taylor Barral	423	16.0	+5.5
Liberal Democrats	Sarah Risbin	163	6.2	+2.2
UKIP	Frank Snell	155	5.9	N/A
Green	Nick Brown	121	4.6	±0.0
Majority		884	34.1	N/A
Turnout		2,191	35.2	+1.0
Conservative hold		Swing	▲18.0	

=== Blenheim Park ===
Blenheim Park
Party	Candidate	Votes	%	±%
Labour	Laurie Burton	906	35.1	+10.5
Conservative	Floyd Waterworth*	835	32.4	+0.8
Independent	Keith Evans	527	20.4	+15.7
Liberal Democrats	Michael Grimwade	204	7.9	–6.1
UKIP	Paul Lloyd	106	4.1	–16.9
Majority		71	2.8	N/A
Turnout		2,578	31.9	+2.9
Labour gain from Conservative		Swing	▲4.9	

No Green candidate as previous (−4.2).

=== Chalkwell ===
Chalkwell
Party	Candidate	Votes	%	±%
Conservative	Nigel Folkard*	981	40.8	+2.3
Independent	Andy Crow	616	25.6	+2.0
Labour	Sean Jones	535	22.3	+6.0
Liberal Democrats	Jill Allen-King	272	11.3	+6.0
Majority		365	15.2	+0.3
Turnout		2,404	32.7	+2.6
Conservative hold		Swing	▲0.2	

No UKIP (−10.5) or Green (−5.8) candidates as previous.

=== Eastwood Park ===
Eastwood Park
Party	Candidate	Votes	%	±%
Conservative	Andrew Moring*	1,324	54.8	+12.3
Liberal Democrats	Paul Collins	780	32.3	+13.0
Labour	Ros Sanders	311	12.9	+3.7
Majority		544	22.5	+6.8
Turnout		2,415	32.2	–0.3
Conservative hold		Swing	▼0.4	

No UKIP (−26.8) or Green (−2.1) candidates as previous.

=== Kursaal ===
Kursaal
Party	Candidate	Votes	%	±%
Labour	Matt Dent	1,008	51.9	+9.8
Conservative	Dave Clift	479	24.7	+2.2
Liberal Democrats	Howard Gibeon	456	23.5	+19.0
Majority		529	27.2	+7.6
Turnout		1,943	24.4	+2.7
Labour gain from Independent		Swing	▲3.8	

No UKIP (−19.0) or Green (−8.4) candidates as previous.

=== Leigh ===
Leigh
Party	Candidate	Votes	%	±%
Liberal Democrats	Carole Mulroney*	1,077	39.6	–9.5
Conservative	Paul Gilson	879	32.4	+8.6
Labour	Michelle Williams	586	21.6	+10.3
Green	Jon Mullett	175	6.4	–0.8
Majority		198	7.3	–18.0
Turnout		2,717	35.8	+3.2
Liberal Democrats hold		Swing	▼9.1	

No UKIP candidate as previous (−8.5).

=== Milton ===
Milton
Party	Candidate	Votes	%	±%
Labour	Cheryl Nevin*	1,305	50.7	+5.4
Conservative	Garry Lowen	832	32.2	+6.0
Independent	Stephen Cummins	177	6.9	+1.4
Green	Vida Guilford	146	5.7	–0.6
Liberal Democrats	Bob Howes	116	4.5	+1.0
Majority		473	18.4	–0.6
Turnout		2,576	31.5	+1.0
Labour hold		Swing	▼0.3	

No UKIP candidate as previous (−13.2).

=== Prittlewell ===
Prittlewell
Party	Candidate	Votes	%	±%
Conservative	Kevin Buck	1,051	40.3	+10.2
Labour	Jennifer Beck	794	30.5	+3.5
Independent	Tino Callaghan*	435	16.7	N/A
Liberal Democrats	Adam Hutchins	193	7.4	–2.7
Green	Simon Cross	134	5.1	+0.4
Majority		257	9.9	+6.8
Turnout		2,607	33.4	+0.6
Conservative gain from Independent		Swing	▲3.4	

No UKIP (−18.8) or Independent (−9.3) candidates as previous.

=== Shoeburyness ===
Shoeburyness
Party	Candidate	Votes	%	±%
Independent	Nick Ward*	1,332	49.1	+20.1
Conservative	Val Jarvis	847	31.2	+7.1
Labour	Greg Keane	477	17.6	+8.2
Liberal Democrats	Granville Stride	55	2.0	±0.0
Majority		485	17.9	+13.0
Turnout		2,711	28.5	–1.0
Independent hold		Swing	▲6.5	

No UKIP (−12.3), Green (−2.3) or Independent candidate (−21.0) as previous.

=== Southchurch ===
Southchurch
Party	Candidate	Votes	%	±%
Conservative	Daniel Nelson	1,210	47.5	+12.4
Independent	Derek Kenyon*	696	27.3	–5.3
Labour	Martin Berry	476	18.7	+6.6
Green	Jules Esposito	102	4.0	+0.7
Liberal Democrats	John Batch	64	2.5	+0.4
Majority		514	20.2	+17.7
Turnout		2,548	33.3	+0.4
Conservative gain from Independent		Swing	▲8.9	

No UKIP (−14.9) candidate as previous.

=== St. Laurence ===
St. Laurence
Party	Candidate	Votes	%	±%
Conservative	David McGlone	855	34.4	–3.8
Independent	David Allen	779	31.3	N/A
Labour	Janet Phillips	438	17.6	+0.5
Liberal Democrats	Kev Malone	416	16.7	+6.6
Majority		76	3.1	–14.8
Turnout		2,488	31.8	+2.8
Conservative hold				

No UKIP (−20.3) or Green (−3.0) candidates as previous.

=== St. Luke's ===
St. Luke's
Party	Candidate	Votes	%	±%
Independent	Trevor Harp	850	37.4	+0.4
Labour	Ian Pope	730	32.1	+11.2
Conservative	Harry Mason	492	21.7	+1.2
Green	James Thomas	87	3.8	–0.8
Liberal Democrats	Christopher Arnold	70	3.1	+1.7
Psychedelic Future	Jason Pilley	42	1.8	N/A
Majority		120	5.3	–10.8
Turnout		2,271	27.7	–0.6
Independent hold		Swing	▼5.4	

No UKIP (−15.6) candidates as previous.

=== Thorpe ===
Thorpe
Party	Candidate	Votes	%	±%
Independent	Martin Terry*	1,871	58.6	–4.5
Conservative	James Moyies	935	29.3	+13.3
Labour	Jack Reason	305	9.6	+3.4
Liberal Democrats	James Clinkscales	80	2.5	+0.6
Majority		936	29.3	–17.8
Turnout		3,191	42.7	+2.7
Independent hold		Swing	▼8.9	

No Independent (−63.1), UKIP (−10.0) or Green (−2.8) candidates as previous.

=== Victoria ===
Victoria
Party	Candidate	Votes	%	±%
Labour	Margaret Borton*	1,222	61.0	+6.3
Conservative	John Harland	492	24.6	+9.3
Green	Clare Fletcher	288	14.4	+7.9
Majority		730	36.5	+1.6
Turnout		2,002	25.3	+0.3
Labour hold		Swing	▼1.5	

No UKIP (−19.8) or Liberal Democrat (−3.7) candidates as previous.

=== West Leigh ===
West Leigh
Party	Candidate	Votes	%	±%
Conservative	Fay Evans*	1,489	49.2	+4.6
Liberal Democrats	Ashley Thompson	1,041	34.4	+6.3
Labour	Hilary Scarnell	367	12.1	+3.5
UKIP	Lesley Martin	129	4.3	–7.1
Majority		448	14.7	–1.8
Turnout		3,026	42.8	+4.1
Conservative hold		Swing	▼0.9	

No Independent (−4.0) or Green (−3.3) candidates as previous.

=== West Shoebury ===
West Shoebury
Party	Candidate	Votes	%	±%
Conservative	Denis Garne	1,089	44.6	+8.6
Independent	Peter Lovett	792	32.4	–1.7
Labour	Tom Murray	367	15.0	+4.8
Liberal Democrats	David Barrett	195	8.0	+5.6
Majority		297	12.2	+10.3
Turnout		3,042	32.7	+1.9
Conservative hold		Swing	▲5.2	

No UKIP (−15.3) or Green (−2.0) candidates as previous.

=== Westborough ===
Westborough
Party	Candidate	Votes	%	±%
Labour	Kevin Robinson*	1,146	52.4	+18.5
Conservative	Jack Warren	539	24.7	+9.2
Independent	Alan Hart	194	8.9	+5.1
Liberal Democrats	Billy Boulton	175	8.0	+2.2
Green	Paul Mansfield	131	6.0	–0.1
Majority		607	27.8	+16.0
Turnout		2,185	28.5	+0.9
Labour hold		Swing	▲4.7	

No Independent (−22.1) or UKIP (−12.9) candidates as previous.

== By-elections ==
Milton By-Election 21 March 2019
Party	Candidate	Votes	%	±%
Labour	Stephen George	833	49.9	−0.8
Conservative	Garry Lowen	528	31.6	−0.7
Liberal Democrats	Carol White	219	13.1	+8.6
For Britain	James Quail	89	5.3	+5.3
Majority		305	18.3	
Turnout		1,669		
Labour hold		Swing		
