= 1973 Southend-on-Sea Borough Council election =

1973 English local election

1973 Southend-on-Sea Borough Council elections
- 10 May 1973

All 48 seats to Southend-on-Sea Borough Council 25 seats needed for a majority

	First party	Second party	Third party
Party	Conservative	Labour	Liberal
Seats won	24	13	11
Popular vote	60,910	34,769	31,586
Percentage	47.9%	27.3%	24.8%
Council control after election
No overall control

The 1973 Southend-on-Sea Borough Council election took place on 10 May 1973 to elect members of Southend-on-Sea Borough Council in Essex, England. This was on the same day as other local elections.

This was the inaugural election to the council following its formation by the Local Government Act 1972.

== Summary ==
=== Election result ===
1973 Southend-on-Sea Borough Council election
Party	Candidates	Seats	Gains	Losses	Net gain/loss	Seats %	Votes %	Votes	+/−
Conservative	47	24	N/A	N/A	N/A	50.0	47.9	60,910	N/A
Labour	48	13	N/A	N/A	N/A	27.1	27.3	34,769	N/A
Liberal	20	11	N/A	N/A	N/A	22.9	24.8	31,586	N/A
