= 1982 Southend-on-Sea Borough Council election =

1982 English local election

- 6 May 1982

13 out of 39 seats to Southend-on-Sea Borough Council 20 seats needed for a majority

	First party	Second party
Party	Conservative	Alliance
Seats won	10	3
Seats after	25	8
Seat change	▼1	▲2
Popular vote	23,787	16,554
Percentage	49.0%	34.1%
Swing	▲4.6%	▲6.7%
	Third party	Fourth party
Party	Labour	Independent
Seats won	0	0
Seats after	5	1
Seat change	▼1	Steady
Popular vote	7,821	361
Percentage	16.1%	0.7%
Swing	▼10.2%	▼0.5%
- Winner of each seat at the 1982 Southend-on-Sea Borough Council election.
Council control before election
Conservative
Council control after election
Conservative

The 1982 Southend-on-Sea Borough Council election took place on 6 May 1982 to elect members of Southend-on-Sea Borough Council in Essex, England. This was on the same day as other local elections.

== Summary ==
=== Election result ===
1982 Southend-on-Sea Borough Council election
Party	This election			Full council			This election		
Party	Seats	Net	Seats %	Other	Total	Total %	Votes	Votes %	+/−
Conservative	10	▼1	76.9	15	25	64.1	23,787	49.0	+4.6
Alliance	3	▲2	23.1	5	8	20.5	16,554	34.1	+6.7
Labour	0	▼1	0.0	5	5	12.8	7,821	16.1	–10.2
Independent	0	Steady	0.0	1	1	2.6	361	0.7	–0.5

== Ward results ==
Incumbent councillors standing for re-election are marked with an asterisk (*). Changes in seats do not take into account by-elections or defections.

=== Belfairs ===
Belfairs
Party	Candidate	Votes	%	±%
Conservative	J. Pryor	2,284	52.9	–3.9
Alliance	B. Griggs	1,750	40.5	+9.6
Labour	A. Dunn	284	6.6	–5.8
Majority		534	12.4	–13.5
Turnout		4,318	44.5	+8.8
Registered electors		9,718		
Conservative hold		Swing	▼6.8	

=== Blenheim ===
Blenheim
Party	Candidate	Votes	%	±%
Conservative	P. Bone*	1,988	48.8	–2.6
Alliance	P. Jack	1,534	37.6	+6.8
Labour	M. Howard	555	13.6	–4.2
Majority		454	11.1	–9.5
Turnout		4,077	41.4	+4.7
Registered electors		9,873		
Conservative hold		Swing	▼4.7	

=== Chalkwell ===
Chalkwell
Party	Candidate	Votes	%	±%
Conservative	A. Daniels	2,369	61.0	+2.3
Alliance	J. Keith	1,212	31.2	+0.6
Labour	M. Howells	300	7.7	–3.0
Majority		1,157	29.8	+1.7
Turnout		3,881	41.0	+4.3
Registered electors		9,470		
Conservative hold		Swing	▲0.9	

=== Eastwood ===
Eastwood
Party	Candidate	Votes	%	±%
Conservative	I. Downie*	1,818	51.7	+1.6
Alliance	D. Elf	1,433	40.7	+4.0
Labour	N. Boorman	268	7.6	–5.7
Majority		385	10.9	–2.5
Turnout		3,519	33.7	–0.6
Registered electors		10,440		
Conservative hold		Swing	▼1.2	

=== Leigh ===
Leigh
Party	Candidate	Votes	%	±%
Alliance	T. Meddle	2,372	52.6	+1.9
Conservative	M. Dolby	1,910	42.4	–0.8
Labour	L. Davidson	226	5.0	–1.1
Majority		462	10.2	+2.7
Turnout		4,508	47.9	–0.8
Registered electors		9,406		
Alliance hold		Swing	▲1.4	

=== Milton ===
Milton
Party	Candidate	Votes	%	±%
Conservative	K. Cater*	1,276	48.9	+7.3
Labour	K. Kirk	536	20.5	–6.1
Alliance	J. Overy	439	16.8	+7.9
Independent	M. Burstin	361	13.8	–9.2
Majority		740	28.3	+13.3
Turnout		2,612	31.8	+0.9
Registered electors		8,233		
Conservative hold		Swing	▲6.7	

=== Prittlewell ===
Prittlewell
Party	Candidate	Votes	%	±%
Alliance	J. Hugill	1,925	47.9	+3.4
Conservative	L. Myers*	1,569	39.0	+2.6
Labour	P. Long	526	13.1	–5.9
Majority		356	8.9	+0.8
Turnout		4,020	40.9	+0.3
Registered electors		9,859		
Alliance gain from Conservative		Swing	▲0.4	

=== Shoebury ===
Shoebury
Party	Candidate	Votes	%	±%
Conservative	D. Ascroft	2,224	50.8	+11.5
Labour	B. McGaw	1,176	26.8	–15.2
Alliance	Y. Rushman	982	22.4	+3.7
Majority		1,048	23.9	N/A
Turnout		4,382	40.6	+1.9
Registered electors		11,311		
Conservative hold		Swing	▲13.4	

=== Southchurch ===
Southchurch
Party	Candidate	Votes	%	±%
Conservative	J. Croft	2,154	55.2	+11.5
Alliance	N. Baker	900	23.1	+3.7
Labour	A. Lancaster	846	21.7	–15.2
Majority		1,254	32.2	+9.1
Turnout		4,382	39.0	+1.6
Registered electors		10,010		
Conservative hold		Swing	▲3.9	

=== St Lukes ===
St Lukes
Party	Candidate	Votes	%	±%
Conservative	N. Goldsmith	1,056	36.8	+5.1
Alliance	M. Phelan	905	31.6	+18.8
Labour	D. Waring	905	31.6	–23.9
Majority		151	5.3	N/A
Turnout		2,866	33.5	+2.9
Registered electors		8,564		
Conservative hold		Swing	▼6.9	

=== Thorpe ===
Thorpe
Party	Candidate	Votes	%	±%
Conservative	N. Moss*	2,380	67.3	+6.2
Alliance	R. White	694	19.6	+3.7
Labour	M. Hurley	461	13.0	–1.8
Majority		1,686	47.7	+2.4
Turnout		3,535	34.2	–3.7
Registered electors		10,346		
Conservative hold		Swing	▲1.3	

=== Victoria ===
Victoria
Party	Candidate	Votes	%	±%
Conservative	D. Hopkins	1,212	39.4	+10.4
Labour	R. Kennedy*	1,051	34.1	–14.4
Alliance	D. Turner	815	26.5	+4.0
Majority		161	5.2	N/A
Turnout		3,078	31.6	–5.8
Registered electors		9,748		
Conservative gain from Labour		Swing	▲12.4	

=== Westborough ===
Westborough
Party	Candidate	Votes	%	±%
Alliance	J. Palmer	1,593	41.6	+4.6
Conservative	M. Smith	1,547	40.4	+7.5
Labour	A. Smith	687	18.0	–12.1
Majority		46	1.2	–2.9
Turnout		3,827	42.6	+0.6
Registered electors		9,005		
Alliance gain from Conservative		Swing	▼1.5	
