= 2027 Southend-on-Sea City Council election =

2027 English local government election

- 6 May 2027

17 out of 51 seats to Southend-on-Sea City Council 26 seats needed for a majority
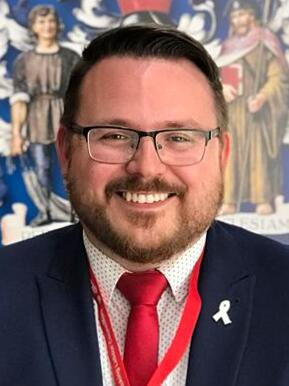

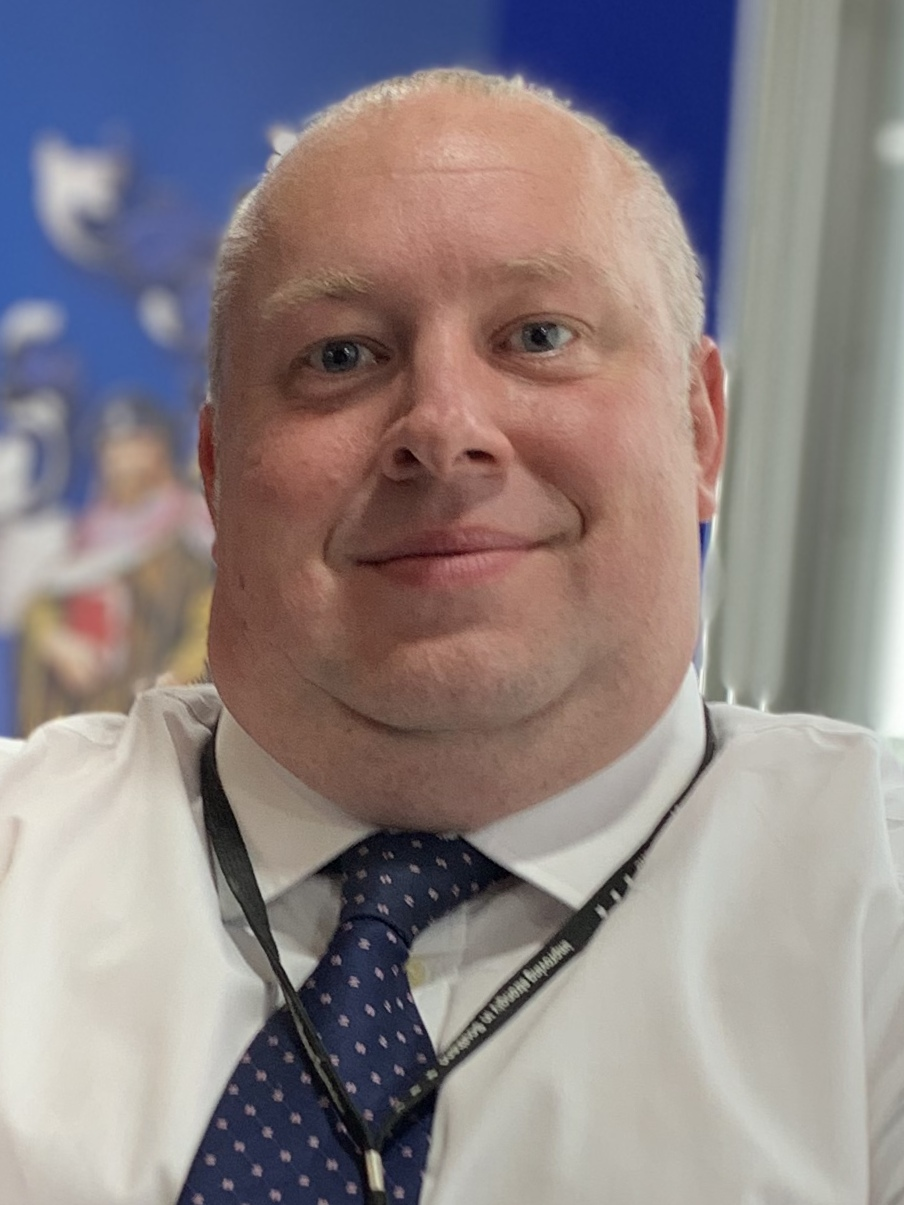

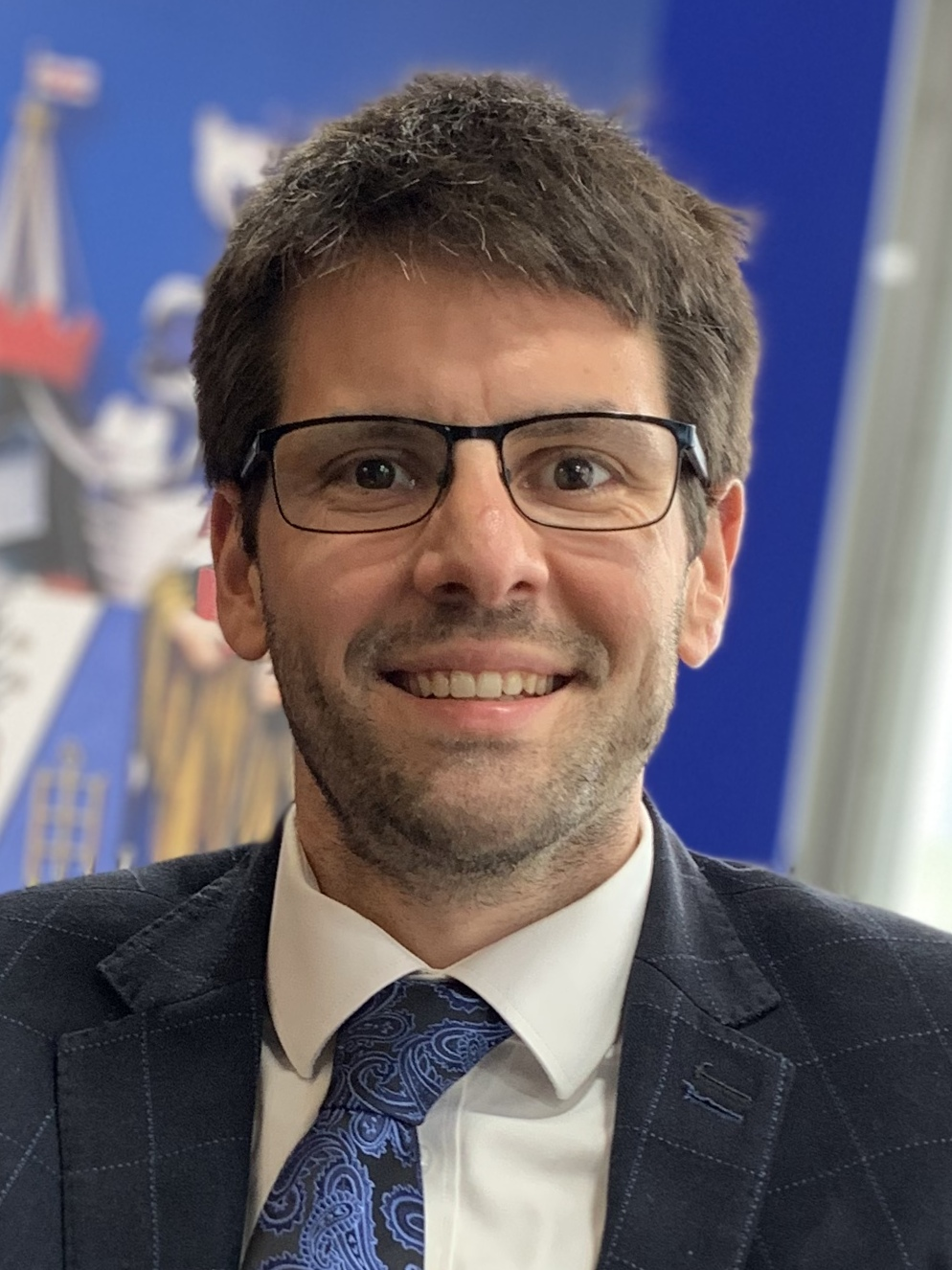

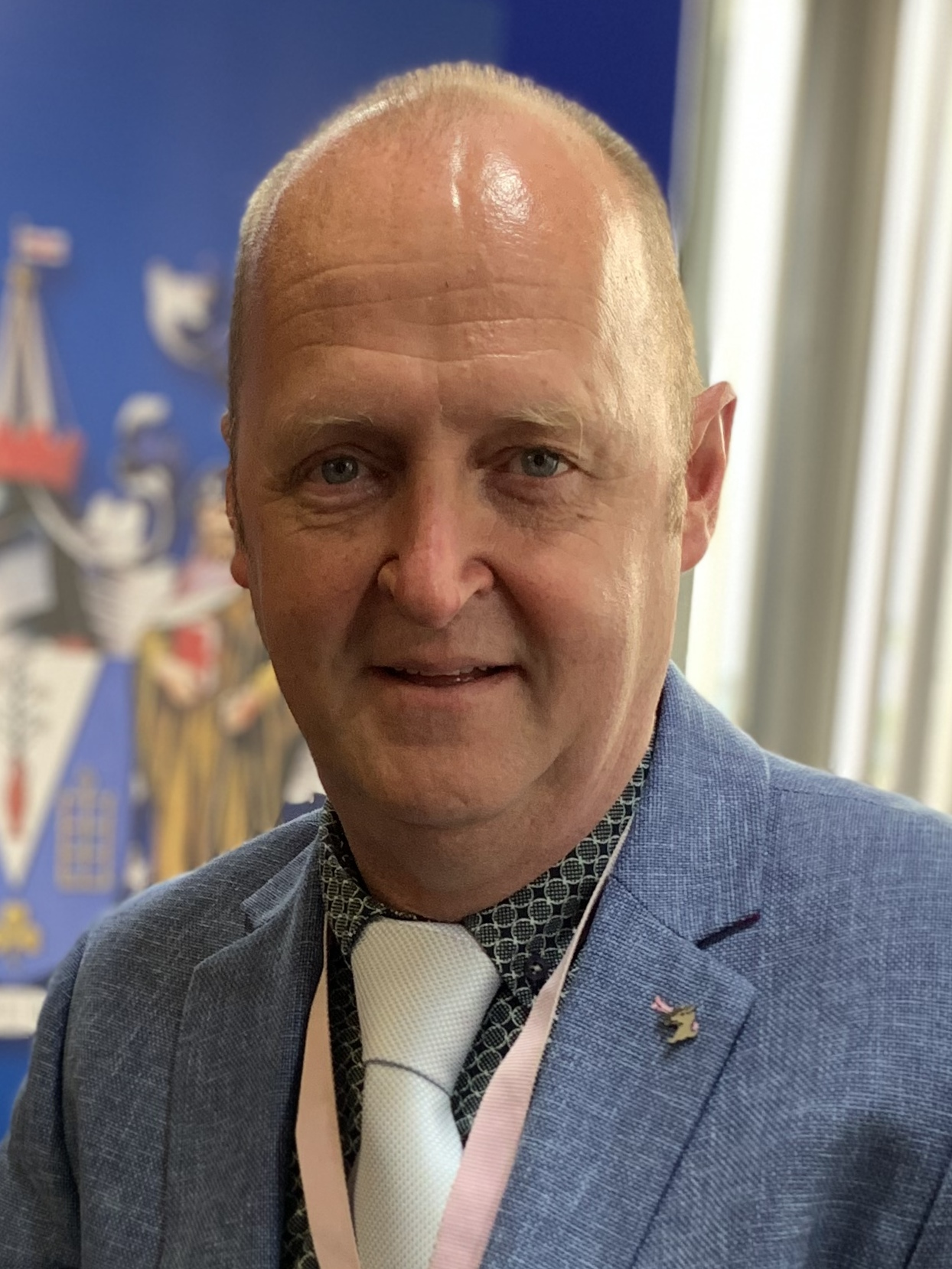

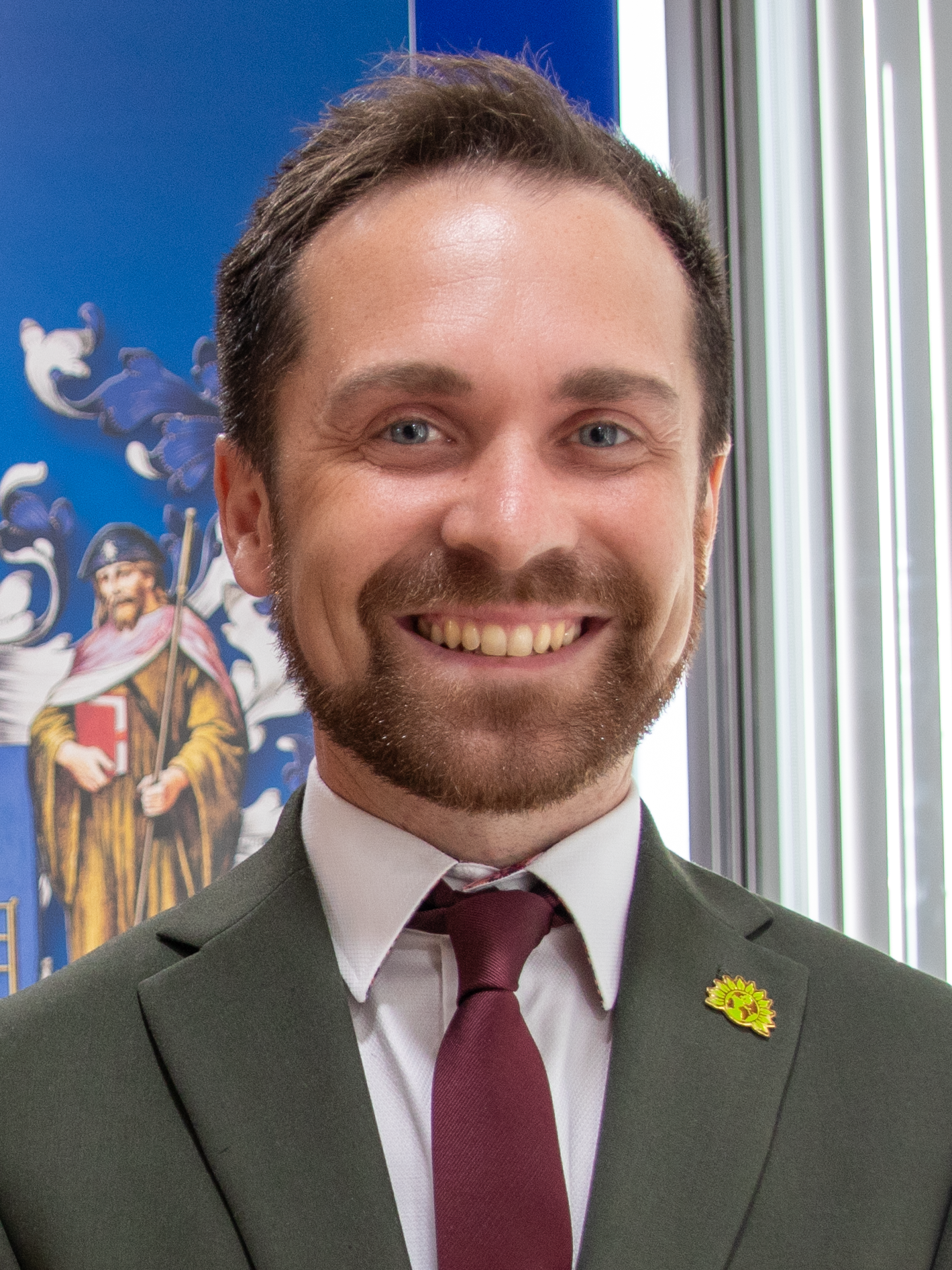

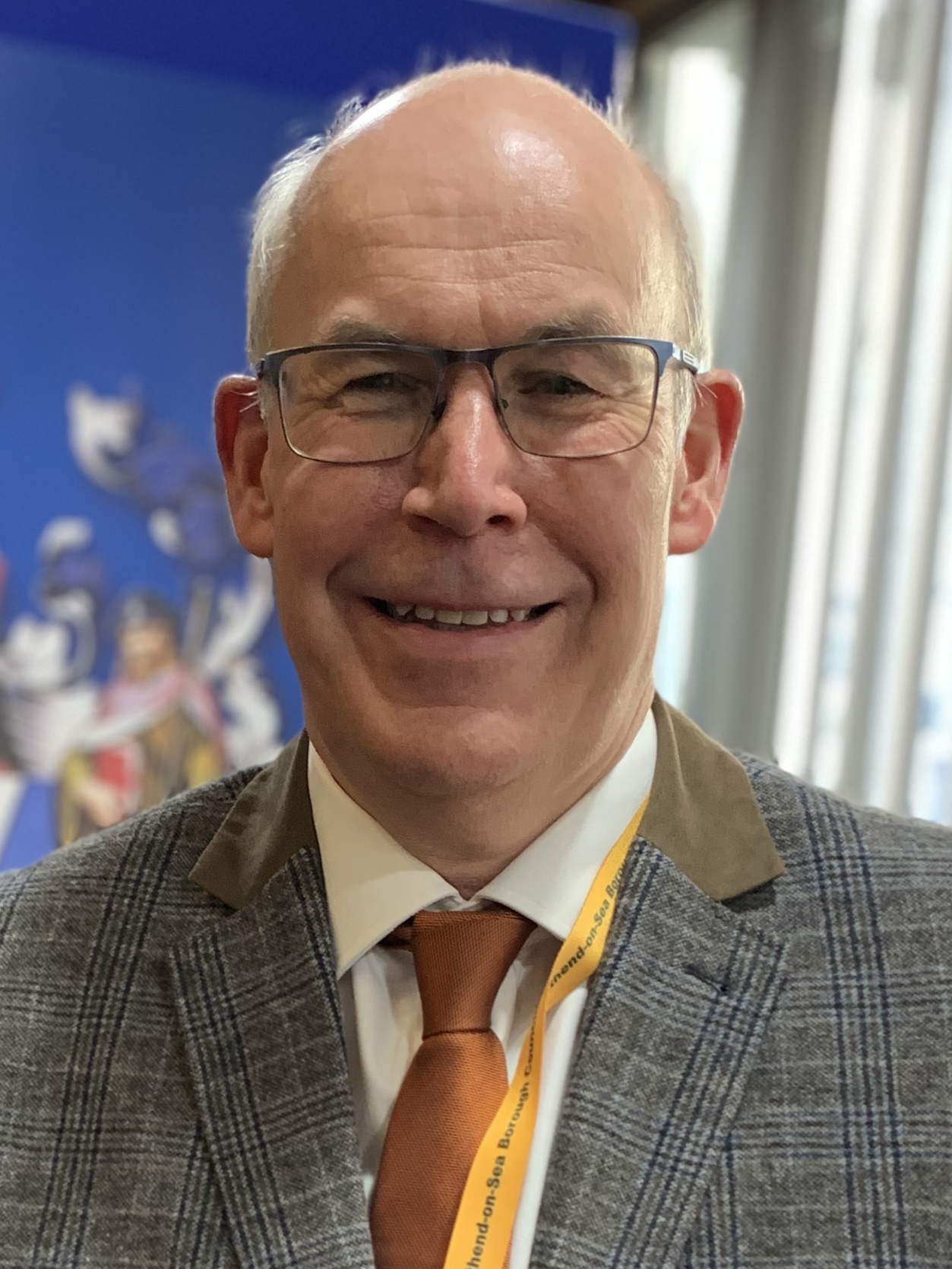
Leader	Daniel Cowan	Tony Cox	James Courtenay
Party	Labour	Reform	Conservative
Leader's seat	St Laurence	West Shoebury	Chalkwell
Last election	17 seats, 16.3%	11 seats, 31.3%	11 seats, 18.5%
Current seats	17	11	11
Leader	Stephen Wakefield	Stuart Allen	Paul Collins
Party	Independent	Green	Liberal Democrats
Leader's seat	Shoeburyness	Leigh	Eastwood Park
Last election	5 seats, 5.9%	4 seats, 17.4%	3 seats, 7.7%
Current seats	5	4	3
Incumbent Leader
Daniel Cowan
Labour
No overall control (Note: Labour–Independent–Liberal Democrats coalition.)

The 2027 Southend-on-Sea City Council election will be held on 6 May 2027 to elect members of Southend-on-Sea City Council in Essex, England. This will be held on the same day as other local elections across the United Kingdom.

== Background ==
Due to proposed structural changes to local government in England, the 2026 election was intended to be the final election to the council before it was abolished and replaced by South East Essex Council, a unitary authority. However, the government announced on 7 September 2026 it was withdrawing plans for the planned restructuring pending a review. Following this announcement, local elections due to be held in 2027 under the existing local electoral calendar would proceed.

== Summary ==
=== Election result ===
2027 Southend-on-Sea City Council election
Party	This election				Full council			This election		
Party	Candidates	Seats	Net	Seats %	Other	Total	Total %	Votes	Votes %	+/−
Labour					11					
Reform					10					
Conservative					7					
Independent					1					
Green					3					
Liberal Democrats					2					

=== Incumbents ===
Ward	Incumbent councillor	Party	Re-standing
Belfairs	Stephen Aylen	Independent	
Blenheim Park	Donna Richardson	Labour	
Chalkwell	Stephen Habermel	Conservative	
Eastwood Park	Paul Collins	Liberal Democrats	
Kursaal	Chris Webster (Note: Elected at 2024 Kursaal by-election.)	Labour	
Leigh	Richard Longstaff	Green	
Milton	Cheryl Nevin	Labour	
Prittlewell	Meg Davidson	Conservative	
Shoeburyness	Steven Wakefield	Independent	
Southchurch	Colin Campbell	Conservative	
St Laurence	Daniel Cowan	Labour	
St Luke's	Martin Berry (Note: Originally elected as Labour, but later left the party to sit as an independent.)	Independent	
Thorpe	Ron Woodley	Independent	
Victoria	Mandy O'Connor	Labour	
West Leigh	Owen Cartey	Conservative	
West Shoebury	Tony Cox (Note: Originally elected as a Conservative, but later defected to Reform.)	Reform	
Westborough	Anne Jones	Labour	
