= 2023 Southend-on-Sea City Council election =

2023 local election in Southend-on-Sea

← 2022	4 May 2023	2024 →

17 of the 51 seats to Southend-on-Sea City Council 26 seats needed for a majority
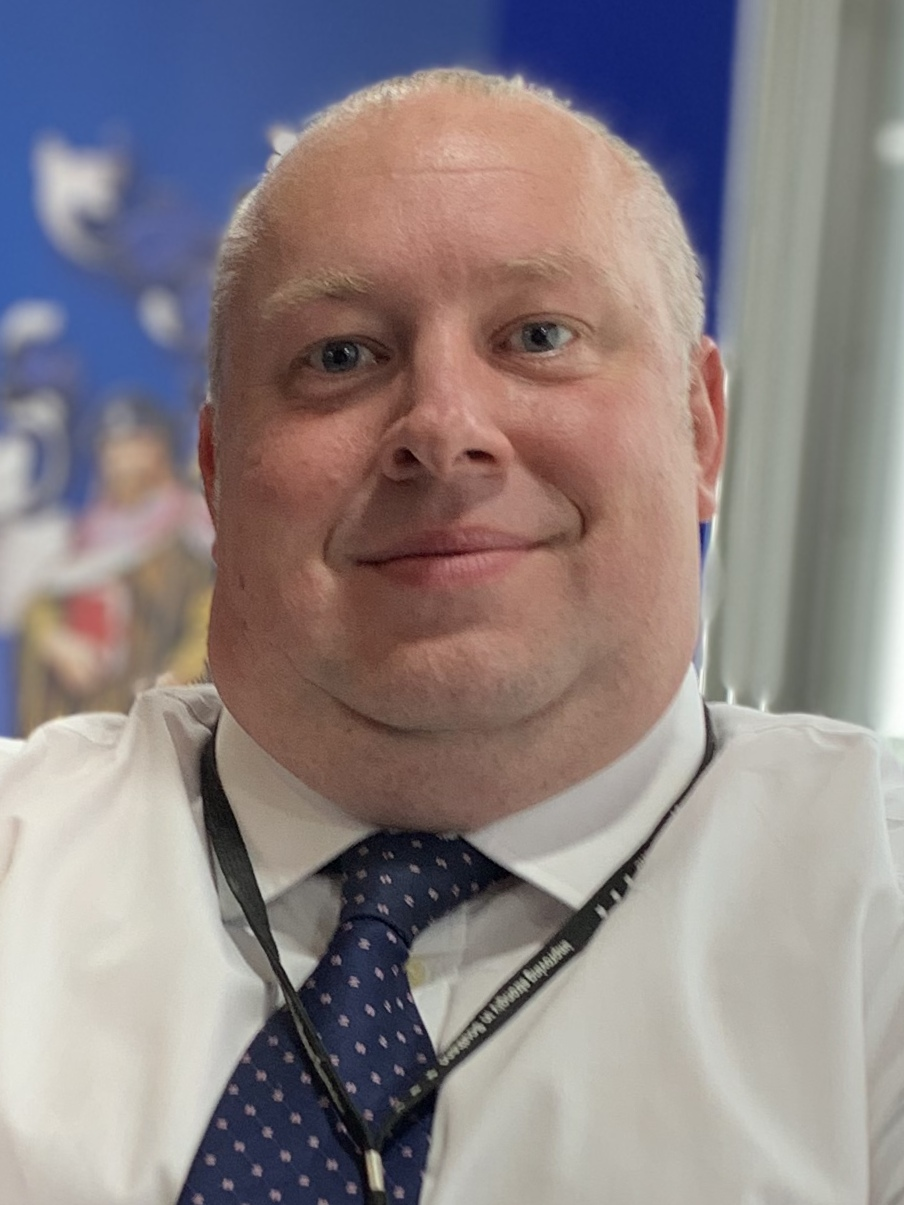

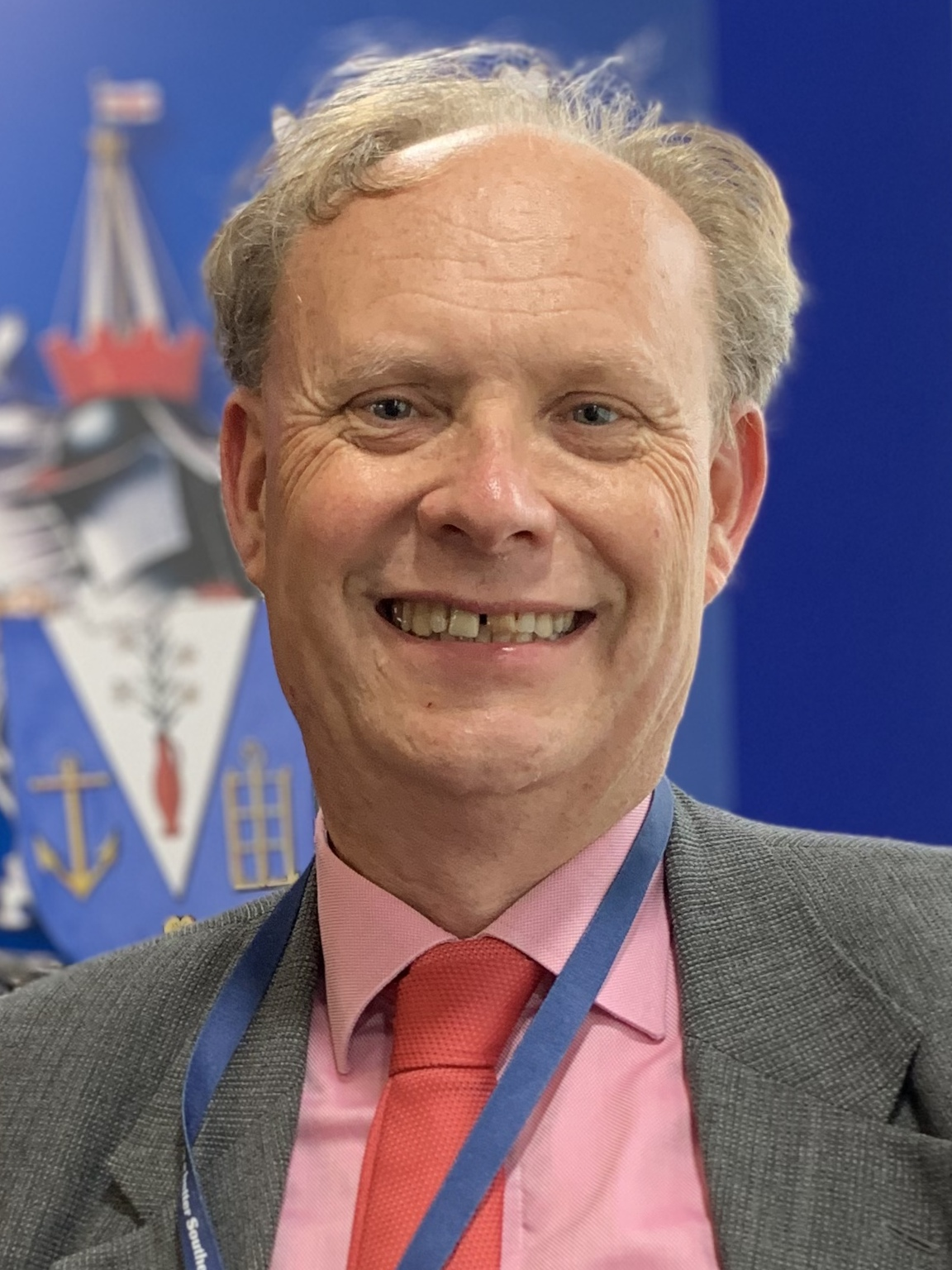

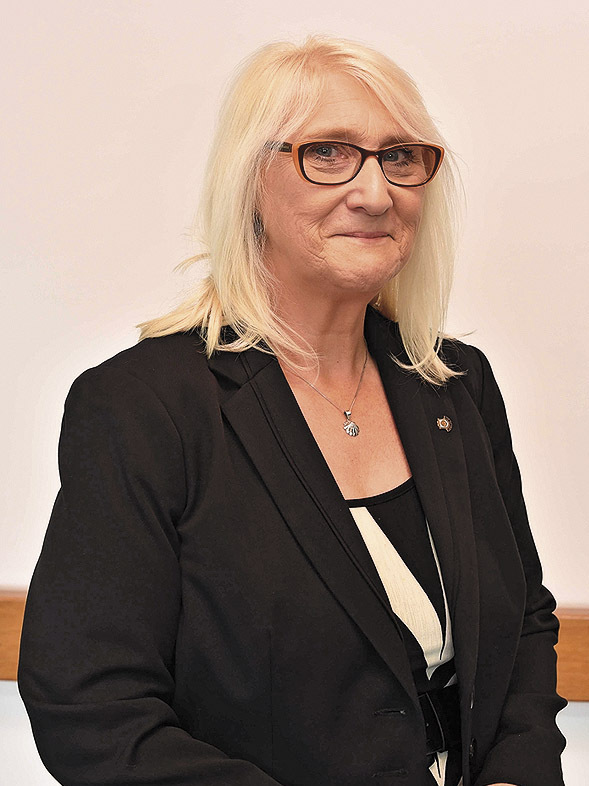

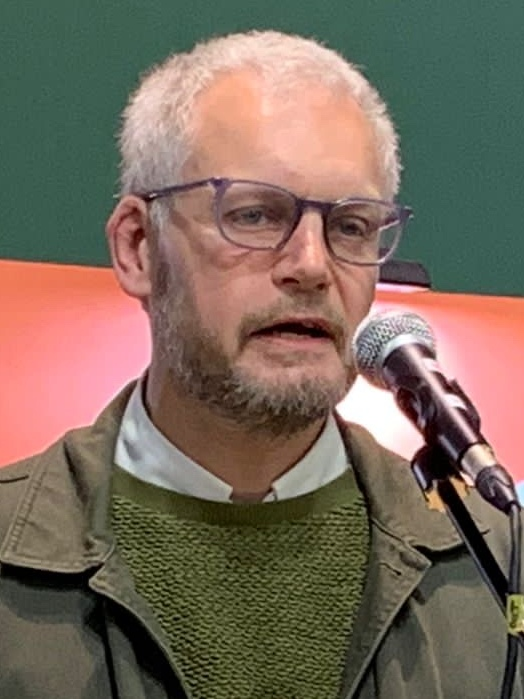
	First party	Second party	Third party
			Ind
Leader	Tony Cox	Stephen George	n/a
Party	Conservative	Labour	Independent
Leader since	9 May 2019	11 May 2022
Leader's seat	West Shoebury	Milton	n/a
Last election	21 seats, 38.2%	16 seats, 30.4%	8 seats, 8.4%
Seats before	21	15	9 (Note: Of the nine independent councillors before the election, five formed the "Independent Group" led by Martin Terry, two formed the "Residents First" group and two were not aligned to any group.)
Seats won	5	7	3
Seats after	22	17	7
Seat change	▲1	▲2	▼2
Popular vote	13,305	11,487	4,928
Percentage	33.2%	28.7%	12.3%
Swing	▼5.0%	▼1.7%	▲3.9%
	Fourth party	Fifth party
Leader	Carole Mulroney	Richard Longstaff
Party	Liberal Democrats	Green
Leader since	May 2017	4 May 2023
Leader's seat	Leigh	Leigh
Last election	6 seats, 13.2%	0 seats, 7.4%
Seats before	6	0
Seats won	1	1
Seats after	4	1
Seat change	▼2	▲1
Popular vote	5,298	3,653
Percentage	13.2%	9.1%
Swing	0.0%	▲1.7%
- Winner of each seat at the 2023 Southend-on-Sea City Council election
Leader before election
Stephen George
Labour
No overall control
Leader after election
Tony Cox
Conservative
No overall control

The 2023 Southend-on-Sea City Council election was held on 4 May 2023 to elect members of Southend-on-Sea City Council in England. It coincided with local elections across the United Kingdom.

The council is elected by thirds, so a single member will be elected from all 17 wards to a term of four years. The seats elected at this election were last contested in 2019.

Prior to the election the council was under no overall control, being run by a Labour, Liberal Democrat and independent coalition. Following the election the council remained under no overall control, but the Conservatives were able to form a minority administration with support from some of the independent councillors.

== Summary ==
=== Council composition ===
In the 2022 election, the Conservative Party and the Independents lost seats while Labour and the Liberal Democrats gained seats. While the Conservative were the largest party, the council was run by a Labour-led coalition along with the Liberal Democrats and Independents. Since then one Labour and one Independent councillor left their groups and formed a new group called Residents First.

Council composition following the 2022 council election

Council composition ahead of the 2023 council election

After 2022 election		Before 2023 election	
Party	Seats	Party	Seats
Conservative	21	Conservative	21
Labour	16	Labour (Note: Including two Labour and Co-operative)	15
Liberal Democrats	6	Liberal Democrats	6
Independent	6	Independent	5
Non-aligned	2	Non-aligned	2
		Residents First	2

=== Election result ===
2023 Southend-on-Sea City Council election
Party	This election			Full council			This election		
Party	Seats	Net	Seats %	Other	Total	Total %	Votes	Votes %	+/−
Conservative	5	Steady	29.4	17	22	43.1	13,305	33.2	–5.0
Labour	7	▲2	41.2	10	17	33.3	11,487	28.7	–1.7
Independent	3	▼1	17.6	4	7	13.7	4,928	12.3	+3.9
Liberal Democrats	1	▼2	5.9	3	4	7.9	5,298	13.2	±0.0
Green	1	▲1	5.9	0	1	2.0	3,653	9.1	+1.7
Confelicity	0	Steady	0.0	0	0	0.0	1,159	2.9	+1.1
Heritage	0	Steady	0.0	0	0	0.0	140	0.3	N/A
British Democrats	0	Steady	0.0	0	0	0.0	42	0.1	N/A
Psychedelic Future	0	Steady	0.0	0	0	0.0	13	<0.1	N/A

== Ward results ==
Results of the City Council election were released by Southend-on-Sea City Council on 5th May 2023.

Seat changes are compared to the 2019 election and do not take into account interim changes due to by-elections or defections.

=== Belfairs ===
Belfairs
Party	Candidate	Votes	%	±%
Independent	Stephen Aylen	1,195	45.0	+5.3
Conservative	Lesley Salter*	883	33.3	–7.2
Labour	Joe Cresswell	293	11.0	–0.3
Green	Nathaniel Love	147	5.5	+1.9
Liberal Democrats	Alan Crystall	116	4.4	–0.3
Confelicity	Elizabeth Smith	21	0.8	+0.6
Majority		312	11.7	N/A
Turnout		2,667	36.3	+2.0
Registered electors		7,353		
Independent gain from Conservative		Swing	▲6.3	

=== Blenheim Park ===
Blenheim Park
Party	Candidate	Votes	%	±%
Labour Co-op	Donna Richardson	878	34.1	–10.2
Conservative	Bernard Arscott	716	27.8	–11.9
Independent	Keith Evans*	704	27.4	N/A
Green	AJ Sutherland	167	6.5	+1.5
Liberal Democrats	Joyce Onstad	82	3.2	–2.6
Confelicity	Stan Evans-Jack	26	1.0	–0.1
Majority		162	6.3	+1.7
Turnout		2,583	31.9	±0.0
Registered electors		8,097		
Labour Co-op gain from Independent		Swing	▲0.9	

=== Chalkwell ===
Chalkwell
Party	Candidate	Votes	%	±%
Conservative	Stephen Habermel*	1,147	47.5	+2.7
Labour	David Carrington	762	31.6	+1.9
Green	James Vessey-Miller	241	10.0	+2.6
Liberal Democrats	Christopher Hind	189	7.8	–4.3
Confelicity	Linzi Arkus-Binder	75	3.1	+1.0
Majority		385	15.9	+0.8
Turnout		2,421	34.0	+2.1
Registered electors		7,131		
Conservative hold		Swing	▲0.4	

=== Eastwood Park ===
Eastwood Park
Party	Candidate	Votes	%	±%
Liberal Democrats	Paul Collins*	1,786	67.7	+21.7
Conservative	Judith McMahon	626	23.7	–20.3
Labour	Jennifer Lewis	133	5.0	–1.5
Green	RJ Learmouth	54	2.0	±0.0
Confelicity	Simon Spooner	40	1.5	±0.0
Majority		1,160	44.0	+42.0
Turnout		2,646	35.9	+1.3
Registered electors		7,371		
Liberal Democrats hold		Swing	▲21.0	

=== Kursaal ===
Kursaal
Party	Candidate	Votes	%	±%
Labour Co-op	Gabriel Leroy	886	54.9	–7.7
Conservative	Andrew Brookes	348	21.5	–1.8
Green	Thomas Love	134	8.3	+1.8
Confelicity	Lee Clark	90	5.6	+1.6
Liberal Democrats	Rory Windass	80	5.0	+1.4
British Democrats	Stephen Smith	42	2.6	N/A
Heritage	Lara Hurley	35	2.2	N/A
Majority		538	33.4	–5.9
Turnout		1,621	20.5	–1.6
Registered electors		7,907		
Labour Co-op hold		Swing	▼3.0	

=== Leigh ===
Leigh
Party	Candidate	Votes	%	±%
Green	Richard Longstaff	1,042	39.1	+17.6
Liberal Democrats	Syrie Cox	835	31.4	–9.5
Conservative	Craig Watts	501	18.8	–6.4
Labour	Mick Ekers	236	8.9	–2.6
Confelicity	James Miller	36	1.4	+0.5
Psychedelic Future	Jason Pilley	13	0.5	N/A
Majority		207	7.7	N/A
Turnout		2,671	36.2	–0.9
Registered electors		7,379		
Green gain from Liberal Democrats		Swing	▲13.6	

=== Milton ===
Milton
Party	Candidate	Votes	%	±%
Labour	Cheryl Nevin	1,137	51.1	–2.9
Conservative	Marco Mann	538	24.2	–4.0
Green	Sarah-Ann Patel	222	10.0	±0.0
Liberal Democrats	Robert Howes	143	6.4	+1.4
Heritage	Bianca Isherwood	105	4.7	N/A
Confelicity	Dee Curtis	82	3.7	+1.0
Majority		599	26.9	+1.1
Turnout		2,236	27.6	–1.5
Registered electors		8,104		
Labour hold		Swing	▲0.6	

=== Prittlewell ===
Prittlewell
Party	Candidate	Votes	%	±%
Conservative	Meg Davidson*	1,161	43.6	–10.6
Labour Co-op	Shahid Nadeem	998	37.5	+13.2
Liberal Democrats	David Webb	251	9.4	–2.8
Green	Jon Mullett	146	5.5	–2.0
Confelicity	Simon Jones	107	4.0	+2.1
Majority		163	6.1	–23.8
Turnout		2,671	34.3	+4.1
Registered electors		7,787		
Conservative hold		Swing	▼11.9	

=== Shoeburyness ===
Shoeburyness
Party	Candidate	Votes	%	±%
Independent	Steven Wakefield*	885	38.7	+0.8
Conservative	Steve Harvey	802	35.1	–0.8
Labour	Ian Pope	376	16.5	–1.1
Green	Fiona Clapperton	119	5.2	+0.2
Liberal Democrats	Granville Stride	58	2.5	+0.5
Confelicity	Kayleigh Burgess	45	2.0	+0.5
Majority		83	3.6	N/A
Turnout		2,292	26.7	–1.7
Registered electors		8,584		
Independent hold		Swing	▲0.8	

=== Southchurch ===
Southchurch
Party	Candidate	Votes	%	±%
Conservative	Colin Campbell	1,138	51.8	–10.3
Independent	Maggie Kelly	368	16.8	N/A
Labour	Gray Sergeant	353	16.1	–3.1
Green	Jo Bates	154	7.0	–1.6
Confelicity	Dean Harris-Eckett	93	4.2	+1.3
Liberal Democrats	Pamela Austin	91	4.1	–3.1
Majority		770	35.0	–7.9
Turnout		2,200	29.8	–0.4
Registered electors		7,382		
Conservative hold		Swing	N/A	

=== St. Laurence ===
St. Laurence
Party	Candidate	Votes	%	±%
Labour Co-op	Daniel Cowan*	1,308	53.6	+5.7
Conservative	Cheryll Gardiner	869	35.6	–3.5
Liberal Democrats	Dave Poulton	125	5.1	–2.5
Green	Eli London	87	3.6	±0.0
Confelicity	Gail Robertson	53	2.2	+0.3
Majority		439	18.0	+9.2
Turnout		2,448	30.9	–0.9
Registered electors		7,922		
Labour Co-op hold		Swing	▲4.6	

=== St. Luke's ===
St. Luke's
Party	Candidate	Votes	%	±%
Labour	Martin Berry	975	48.7	+4.2
Conservative	Tamkeen Shaikh	438	21.9	–6.2
Independent	Brian Ayling	231	11.5	–1.5
Green	Tilly Hogrebe	179	8.9	+2.2
Confelicity	Jolene Hills	102	5.1	+2.2
Liberal Democrats	Billy Boulton	79	3.9	+1.0
Majority		537	26.8	+10.8
Turnout		2,014	25.1	–3.9
Registered electors		8,014		
Labour gain from Independent		Swing	▲5.2	

=== Thorpe ===
Thorpe
Party	Candidate	Votes	%	±%
Independent	Ron Woodley*	1,108	36.2	–3.4
Conservative	Ken Davidson	867	28.3	–11.3
Independent	Andrew Hall	437	14.3	N/A
Labour	Sam Allen	377	12.3	+0.7
Green	Julie Callow	152	5.0	–0.6
Liberal Democrats	Katie Kurilecz	62	2.0	–0.1
Confelicity	Melissa Aylott	59	1.9	+0.3
Majority		241	7.9	N/A
Turnout		2,978	41.1	–1.3
Registered electors		7,246		
Independent hold		Swing	▲4.0	

=== Victoria ===
Victoria
Party	Candidate	Votes	%	±%
Labour	Mandy O'Connor	1,067	59.6	–0.6
Conservative	Bob Carr	349	19.5	–2.9
Green	Peter Walker	175	9.8	+0.1
Liberal Democrats	Philip Edey	116	6.5	+1.0
Confelicity	Jonathan Humphreys	84	4.7	+2.6
Majority		718	40.1	N/A
Turnout		1,801	19.8	–1.3
Registered electors		9,096		
Labour hold		Swing	▲1.2	

=== West Leigh ===
West Leigh
Party	Candidate	Votes	%	±%
Conservative	Owen Cartey	1,317	47.1	–0.5
Liberal Democrats	Stephen Cummins	965	34.5	–5.3
Green	Stephanie Golder	231	8.3	+2.0
Labour	Carrie Druce	219	7.8	+2.3
Confelicity	Janes Wilkes	64	2.3	+1.5
Majority		352	12.6	+4.8
Turnout		2,804	39.2	–3.2
Registered electors		7,153		
Conservative gain from Liberal Democrats		Swing	▲2.4	

=== West Shoebury ===
West Shoebury
Party	Candidate	Votes	%	±%
Conservative	Tony Cox*	1,268	58.3	±0.0
Labour	Muhammad Ibrahim	451	20.7	–1.4
Green	Lea Williams	186	8.6	+0.8
Liberal Democrats	Richard Collins	163	7.5	+0.3
Confelicity	Michael Arkus-Binder	107	4.9	+0.3
Majority		817	37.6	+1.4
Turnout		2,183	29.8	–1.0
Registered electors		7,326		
Conservative hold		Swing	▲0.7	

=== Westborough ===
Westborough
Party	Candidate	Votes	%	±%
Labour	Anne Jones	1,038	56.9	–5.3
Conservative	Andy Wilkins	337	18.5	–0.5
Green	Stephen Jordan	217	11.9	+3.7
Liberal Democrats	Suzanna Edey	157	8.6	–0.7
Confelicity	Connor Bines	75	4.1	+2.7
Majority		701	38.4	–4.8
Turnout		1,830	24.0	–1.2
Registered electors		7,625		
Labour hold		Swing	▼2.4	
