= 2022 Southend-on-Sea Borough Council election =

2022 UK local government election

2022 Southend-on-Sea Borough Council
← 2021	4 May 2022	2023 →

18 out of 51 seats to Southend-on-Sea Borough Council 26 seats needed for a majority
- Turnout: 31.1%
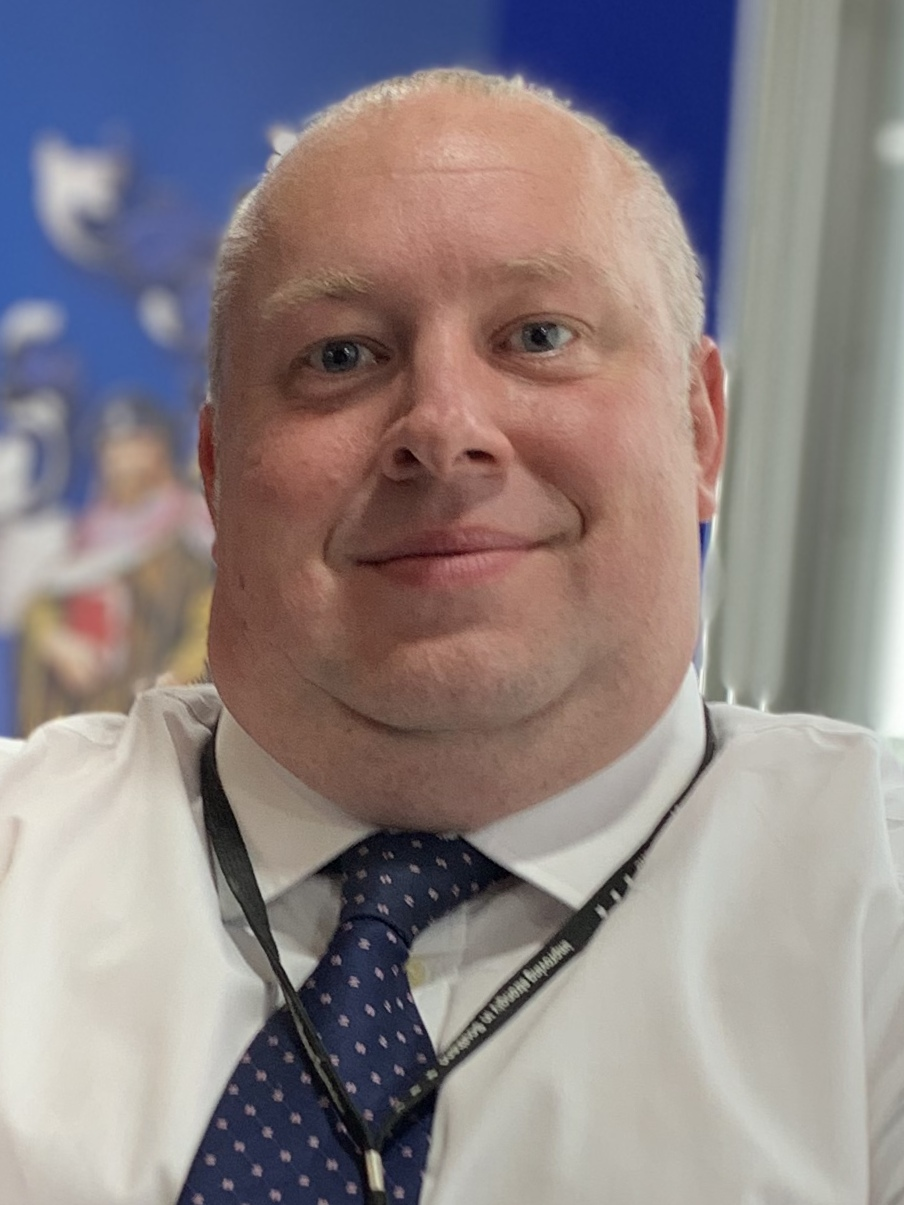

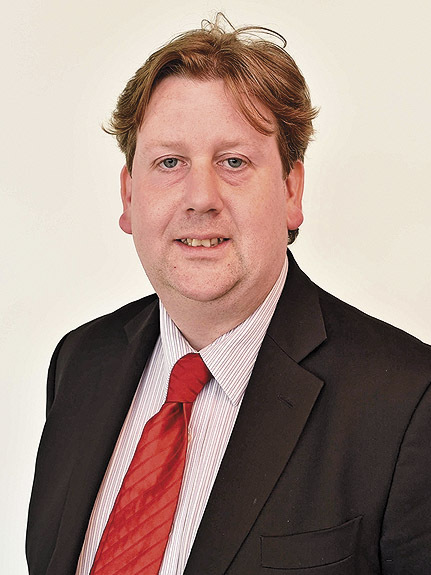

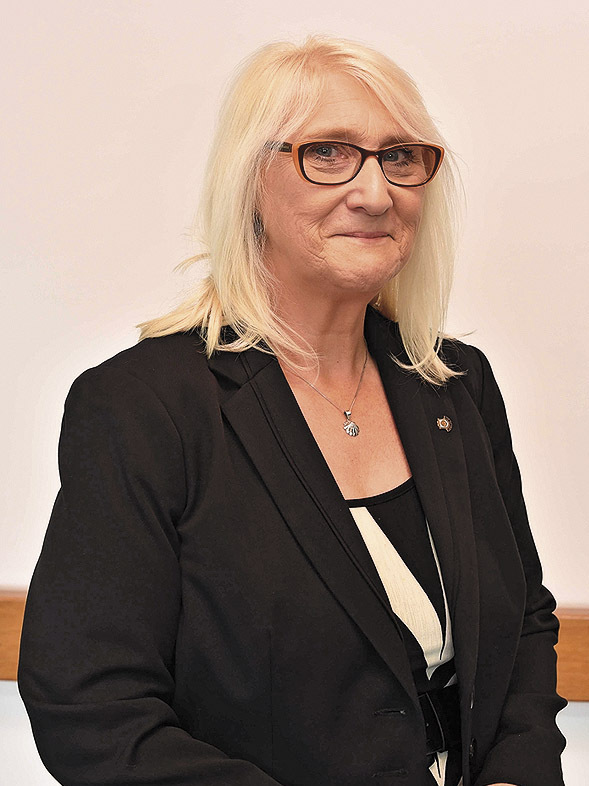
	First party	Second party	Third party
			Ind
Leader	Tony Cox	Ian Gilbert	n/a
Party	Conservative	Labour	Independent
Leader since	9 May 2019	Oct/Nov 2010	n/a
Leader's seat	West Shoebury	Victoria	n/a
Last election	23 seats, 40.5%	13 seats, 30.4%	10 seats, 13.0%
Seats before	23	13	10
Seats won	6	8	2
Seats after	21	16	8
Seat change	▼2	▲3	▼2
Popular vote	16,293	12,940	3,576
Percentage	38.2%	30.4%	8.4%
Swing	▼2.3%	▲4.3%	▼4.6%
	Fourth party	Fifth party
		Green
Leader	Carole Mulroney	n/a
Party	Liberal Democrats	Green
Leader since	May 2017	n/a
Leader's seat	Leigh	n/a
Last election	5 seats, 13.2%	0 seats, 8.1%
Seats before	5	0
Seats won	2	0
Seats after	6	0
Seat change	▲1	Steady
Popular vote	5,611	3,165
Percentage	13.2%	7.4%
Swing	▲1.8%	▼0.7%
- Winner of each seat at the 2022 Southend-on-Sea Borough Council election

Leader before election
Ian Gilbert
Labour
No overall control
Leader after election
Stephen George
Labour
No overall control

The 2022 Southend-on-Sea Borough Council election took place on 5 May 2022 to elect members to Southend-on-Sea Borough Council in Essex, England. This was on the same day as other local elections across the United Kingdom.

The council is elected by thirds, so a single member was elected from all 17 wards to a term of four years. The seats elected at this election were last contested in 2018.

== Summary ==
=== Election result ===
2022 Southend-on-Sea Borough Council election
Party	This election			Full council			This election		
Party	Seats	Net	Seats %	Other	Total	Total %	Votes	Votes %	+/−
Conservative	6	▼2	33.3	15	21	41.2	16,293	38.2	-2.3
Labour	8	▲3	44.4	8	16	29.4	12,940	30.4	+4.3
Independent	2	▼2	11.1	6	8	17.6	3,576	8.4	-4.6
Liberal Democrats	2	▲1	11.1	4	6	11.8	5,611	13.2	+1.8
Green	0	Steady	0.0	0	0	0.0	3,165	7.4	-0.7
Confelicity	0	Steady	0.0	0	0	0.0	779	1.8	N/A
Animal Welfare	0	Steady	0.0	0	0	0.0	109	0.3	N/A
Women's Equality	0	Steady	0.0	0	0	0.0	91	0.2	N/A
Reform UK	0	Steady	0.0	0	0	0.0	45	0.1	N/A

== Ward results ==
=== Belfairs ===
Belfairs
Party	Candidate	Votes	%	±%
Conservative	Alan Dear*	1,033	40.5	−2.8
Independent	Stephen Aylen	1,013	39.7	+3.8
Labour	Alex Small	287	11.3	−0.5
Liberal Democrats	Alan Crystall	119	4.7	+1.4
Green	Peter Walker	93	3.6	−2.1
Confelicity	Dean Harris-Eckett	6	0.2	N/A
Majority		20	0.8	–6.6
Turnout		2,556	34.3	–4.6
Registered electors		7,450		
Conservative hold		Swing	▼3.3	

=== Blenheim Park ===
Blenheim Park
Party	Candidate	Votes	%	±%
Labour	Laurie Burton*	1,130	44.3	+5.9
Conservative	Bernard Arscott	1,013	39.7	−2.7
Liberal Democrats	Jill Allen-King	148	5.8	−0.1
Green	AJ Sutherland	127	5.0	−2.6
Independent	Alan Hart	105	4.1	−1.6
Confelicity	James Fackerell	28	1.1	N/A
Majority		117	4.6	N/A
Turnout		2,566	31.9	–1.8
Registered electors		8,046		
Labour hold		Swing	▲4.3	

=== Chalkwell ===
Chalkwell
Party	Candidate	Votes	%	±%
Conservative	Nigel Folkard*	1,023	44.8	−2.7
Labour	Joe Cresswell	678	29.7	+1.2
Liberal Democrats	Christopher Hind	275	12.1	+3.3
Green	RJ Learmouth	168	7.4	−2.0
Women's Equality	Emily Kent	91	4.0	−1.7
Confelicity	Kevin Waller	47	2.1	N/A
Majority		345	15.1	–3.9
Turnout		2,282	31.9	–4.0
Registered electors		7,173		
Conservative hold		Swing	▼2.0	

=== Eastwood Park ===
Eastwood Park
Party	Candidate	Votes	%	±%
Liberal Democrats	Robert McMullan	1,180	46.0	+7.6
Conservative	Floyd Waterworth	1,129	44.0	−6.8
Labour	Jane Norman	166	6.5	−0.5
Green	James Vessey-Miller	51	2.0	−1.8
Confelicity	Connor Bines	38	1.5	N/A
Majority		51	2.0	N/A
Turnout		2,576	34.6	–2.0
Registered electors		7,447		
Liberal Democrats gain from Conservative		Swing	▲7.2	

=== Kursaal ===
Kursaal
Party	Candidate	Votes	%	±%
Labour Co-op	Matt Dent*	1,105	62.6	+15.2
Conservative	Denis Garne	411	23.3	−12.1
Green	Thomas Love	114	6.5	−6.0
Confelicity	James Miller	70	4.0	N/A
Liberal Democrats	Robert Howes	64	3.6	−1.0
Majority		694	39.3	+27.3
Turnout		1,769	22.1	–2.5
Registered electors		8,006		
Labour Co-op hold		Swing	▲13.7	

=== Leigh ===
Leigh
Party	Candidate	Votes	%	±%
Liberal Democrats	Carole Mulroney*	1,142	40.9	+1.9
Conservative	Paul Gilson	705	25.2	−8.4
Green	Richard Longstaff	600	21.5	+8.8
Labour	Anita Forde	321	11.5	−3.2
Confelicity	Elysia Clack	26	0.9	N/A
Majority		437	15.7	+10.3
Turnout		2,802	37.1	–1.3
Registered electors		7,376		
Liberal Democrats hold		Swing	▲5.2	

=== Milton ===
Milton
Party	Candidate	Votes	%	±%
Labour	Maxine Sadza	1,257	54.0	+4.0
Conservative	Keaton Harland	657	28.2	−5.4
Green	Sarah-Ann Patel	233	10.0	−2.2
Liberal Democrats	Charlotte Kurilecz	116	5.0	+0.8
Confelicity	Dee Curtis	63	2.7	N/A
Majority		600	25.8	+9.4
Turnout		2,337	29.1	–3.1
Registered electors		8,032		
Labour hold		Swing	▲4.7	

=== Prittlewell ===
Prittlewell
Party	Candidate	Votes	%	±%
Conservative	Kevin Buck*	1,278	54.2	+1.2
Labour Co-op	Shahid Nadeem	572	24.3	−3.0
Liberal Democrats	Billy Boulton	288	12.2	+5.0
Green	Jon Mullett	176	7.5	−0.5
Confelicity	Lizzie Smith	44	1.9	N/A
Majority		706	29.9	+4.2
Turnout		2,364	30.2	–5.2
Registered electors		7,817		
Conservative hold		Swing	▲2.1	

=== Shoeburyness ===
Shoeburyness
Party	Candidate	Votes	%	±%
Independent	Nick Ward*	924	37.9	+7.0
Conservative	Colin Campbell	876	35.9	−9.3
Labour	Kevin Ryan	430	7.6	+5.3
Green	Fiona Clapperton	122	5.0	−0.8
Liberal Democrats	Granville Stride	49	2.0	+0.4
Confelicity	Kayleigh Burgess	36	1.5	N/A
Majority		48	2.0	N/A
Turnout		2,437	28.4	–0.6
Registered electors		8,661		
Independent hold		Swing	▲8.2	

=== Southchurch ===
Southchurch
Party	Candidate	Votes	%	±%
Conservative	Daniel Nelson*	1,387	62.1	−1.1
Labour Co-op	Nathan Doucette	429	19.2	+2.9
Green	Jo Bates	193	8.6	+1.0
Liberal Democrats	Pam Austin	161	7.2	+4.5
Confelicity	Jonathan Humphrys	65	2.9	N/A
Majority		958	42.9	–4.0
Turnout		2,245	30.2	–5.7
Registered electors		7,446		
Conservative hold		Swing	▼2.0	

=== St. Laurence ===
St. Laurence
Party	Candidate	Votes	%	±%
Labour Co-op	Lydia Hyde	1,207	47.9	+12.3
Conservative	Dave McGlone*	984	39.1	+1.2
Liberal Democrats	Kev Malone	191	7.6	+5.0
Green	Lea Williams	90	3.6	+1.1
Confelicity	Yasmin Bey	47	1.9	N/A
Majority		223	8.8	N/A
Turnout		2,529	31.8	–2.8
Registered electors		7,958		
Labour Co-op gain from Conservative		Swing	▲5.6	

=== St. Luke's ===
St. Luke's
Party	Candidate	Votes	%	±%
Labour	Kathy Murphy	1,036	44.5	+12.3
Conservative	Jonathan Garston	655	28.1	−4.7
Independent	Brian Ayling	304	13.0	−6.7
Green	Tilly Hogrebe	156	6.7	–5.3
Confelicity	Lee Clark	67	2.9	N/A
Liberal Democrats	Nicky Gilbert	67	2.9	−0.4
Reform UK	Alan Grace	45	1.9	N/A
Majority		381	16.4	N/A
Turnout		2,340	29.0	
Registered electors		8,073		
Labour gain from Independent		Swing	▲8.5	

=== Thorpe ===
Thorpe
Party	Candidate	Votes	%	±%
Independent	Martin Terry*	1,230	39.59	–7.0
Conservative	Azeem Raja	1,229	39.56	+12.4
Labour	Sam Allen	359	11.6	−1.5
Green	Julie Callow	174	5.6	−1.5
Liberal Democrats	Tris Bembridge	65	2.1	+0.2
Confelicity	Melissa Aylott	50	1.6	N/A
Majority		1	0.03	–19.4
Turnout		3,107	42.4	–1.0
Registered electors		7,345		
Independent hold		Swing	▼9.7	

=== Victoria ===
Victoria (2 seats due to by-election)
Party	Candidate	Votes	%	±%
Labour	Margaret Borton*	1,132	63.8	+6.7
Labour	Mandy O'Connor	967	54.5	−2.6
Conservative	Bob Carr	421	23.7	−4.7
Conservative	Steve Harvey	353	19.9	−8.5
Green	Freya Martin	183	10.3	+0.6
Green	Ian Hurd	158	8.9	−0.8
Animal Welfare	Rik Moran	109	6.1	N/A
Liberal Democrats	Phil Edey	104	5.9	+1.1
Liberal Democrats	Gavin Spencer	81	4.6	−0.2
Confelicity	Tommy Taylor	39	2.2	N/A
Turnout		1,884	21.1	–1.2
Registered electors		8,936		
Labour hold				
Labour gain from Independent				

=== West Leigh ===
West Leigh
Party	Candidate	Votes	%	±%
Conservative	Fay Evans*	1,460	47.6	−0.3
Liberal Democrats	Katie Kuilecz	1,220	39.8	+2.9
Green	Nathaniel Love	194	6.3	−1.9
Labour	Mick Ekers	168	5.5	−1.5
Confelicity	James Delaney	23	0.8	N/A
Majority		240	7.8	–3.2
Turnout		3,073	42.6	–3.2
Registered electors		7,215		
Conservative hold		Swing	▼1.6	

=== West Shoebury ===
West Shoebury
Party	Candidate	Votes	%	±%
Conservative	John Harland	1,313	58.3	+1.4
Labour	Gabriel Leroy	498	22.1	+8.6
Green	Paul Hill	176	7.8	+2.2
Liberal Democrats	Richard Collins	162	7.2	+3.6
Confelicity	Michael Arkus-Binder	104	4.6	N/A
Majority		815	36.2	–2.3
Turnout		2,269	30.8	–2.6
Registered electors		7,361		
Conservative hold		Swing	▼3.6	

=== Westborough ===
Westborough
Party	Candidate	Votes	%	±%
Labour	Kevin Robinson*	1,197	62.2	+25.3
Conservative	Tamkeen Shaikh	366	19.0	−3.0
Liberal Democrats	Suzanna Edey	179	9.3	−4.5
Green	Stephanie Golder	157	8.2	−0.6
Confelicity	TK Gondo	26	1.4	N/A
Majority		831	43.2	N/A
Turnout		1,939	25.2	
Registered electors		7,687		
Labour hold		Swing	▲14.2	
