= 2024 Southend-on-Sea City Council election =

Local election in Southend-on-Sea, England

- 2 May 2024

17 out of 51 seats to Southend-on-Sea City Council 26 seats needed for a majority
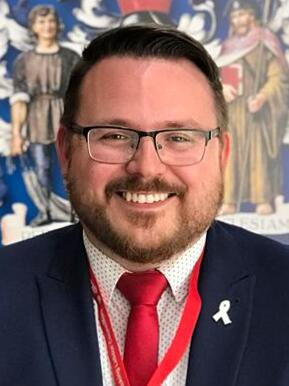

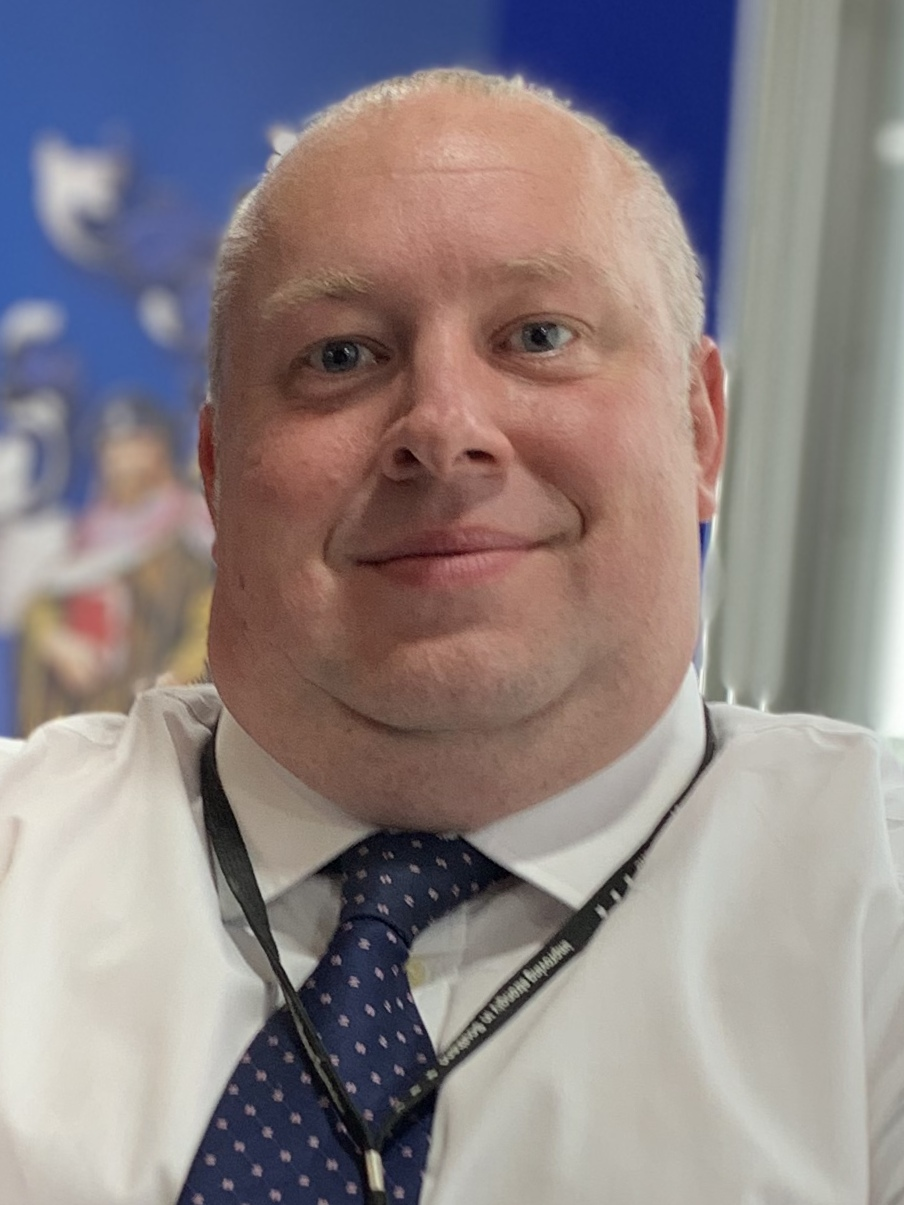

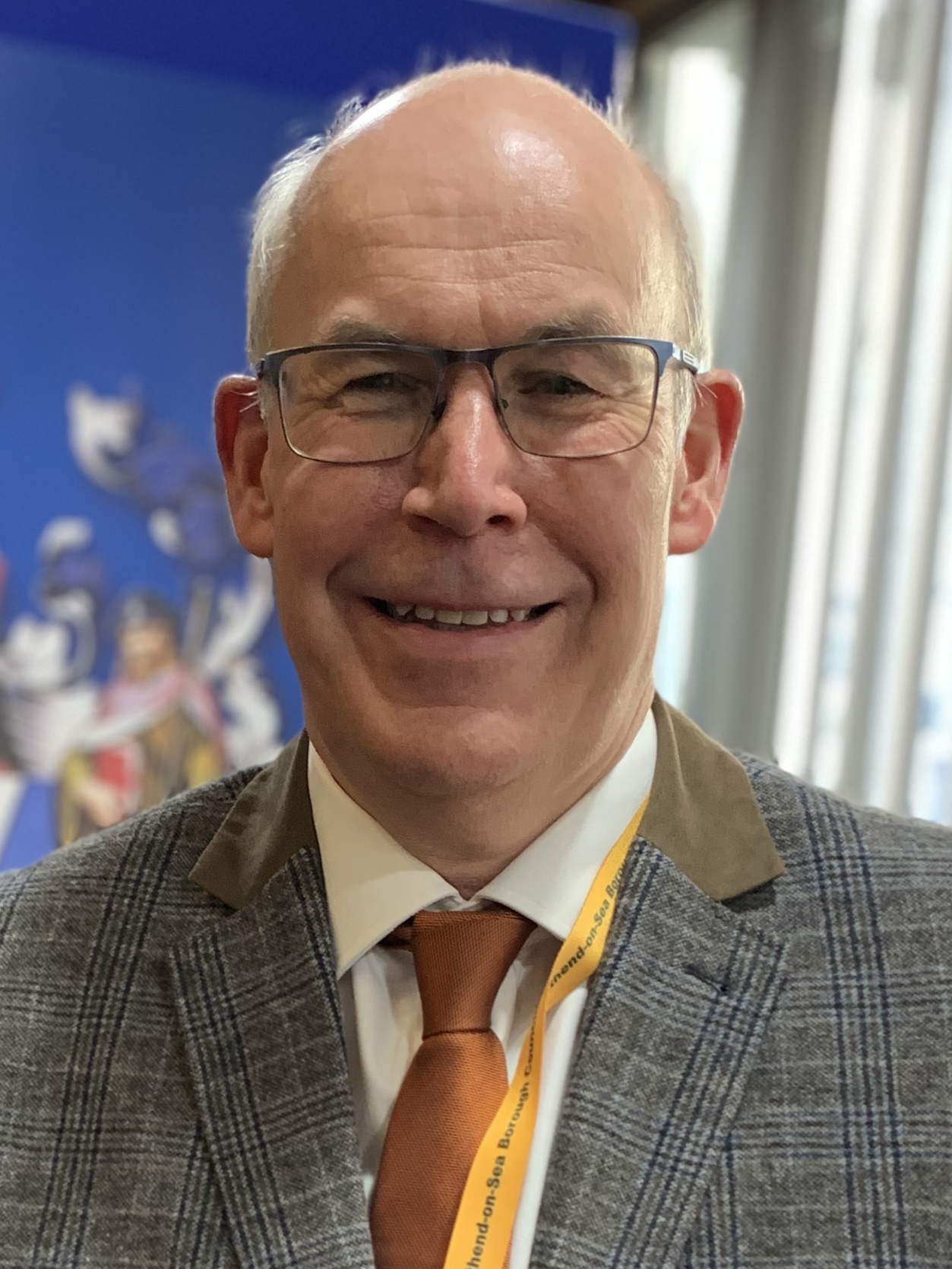

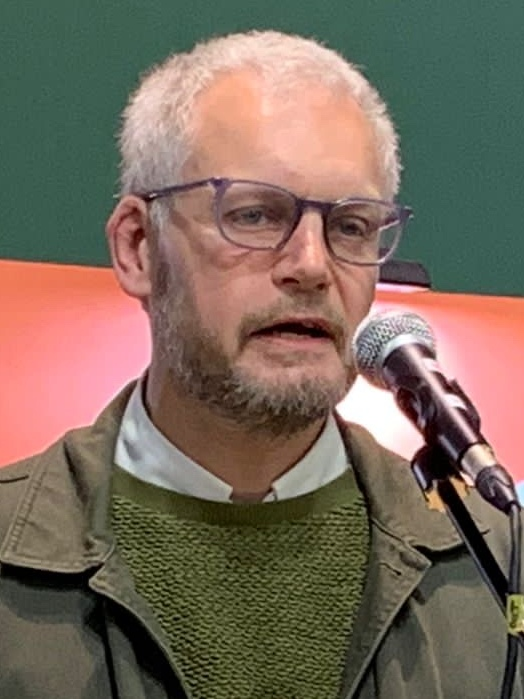
	First party	Second party	Third party
Leader	Daniel Cowan	Tony Cox
Party	Labour	Conservative	Independent
Leader since	9 May 2023	9 May 2019
Leader's seat	St. Laurence	West Shoebury
Last election	17 seats, 28.7%	22 seats, 33.2%	7 seats, 12.3%
Seats before	16	22	8
Seats won	7	7	1
Seats after	20	18	7
Seat change	▲4	▼4	▼1
Popular vote	12,702	12,406	3,572
Percentage	31.6%	30.9%	8.9%
Swing	▲2.9%	▼2.3%	▲3.4%
	Fourth party	Fifth party
Leader	Paul Collins	Richard Longstaff
Party	Liberal Democrats	Green
Leader since	13 May 2023	4 May 2023
Leader's seat	Eastwood Park	Leigh
Last election	4 seats, 13.2%	1 seat, 9.1%
Seats before	4	1
Seats won	1	1
Seats after	4	2
Seat change	Steady	▲1
Popular vote	4,351	5,434
Percentage	10.8%	13.5%
Swing	▼2.4%	▲4.4%
- Winner of each seat at the 2024 Southend-on-Sea City Council election
Leader before election
Tony Cox
Conservative
No overall control
Leader after election
Daniel Cowan
Labour
No overall control

The 2024 Southend-on-Sea City Council election was held on Thursday 2 May 2024, alongside the other local elections in the United Kingdom being held on the same day. There were 17 of the 51 members of Southend-on-Sea City Council in Essex up for election, being the usual third of the council.

The council remained under no overall control, but Labour overtook the Conservatives to become the largest party.

== Background ==
Prior to the election, the council was under no overall control, being run by a Conservative minority administration with informal support from some of the independent councillors.

The seats up for election in 2024 were last contested in 2021; because of the delay of all local elections due to the COVID-19 pandemic, the seats are up for election after 3 years rather than the usual 4. In that election, the Conservatives won 11 seats with 40.5%, Labour won 6 with 26.1%, independents won 1 with 13.0% and the Liberal Democrats won 1 with 11.4%.

== Summary ==
The council remained under no overall control after the election, but Labour gained four seats to become the largest party on the council. A coalition comprising Labour, the Liberal Democrats and four of the independent councillors subsequently formed to run the council, led by the Labour group leader Daniel Cowan. He was formally appointed as leader of the council at a meeting on 20 May 2024.

=== Council composition ===
After 2023 election		Before 2024 election		After 2024 election	
Party	Seats	Party	Seats	Party	Seats
Conservative	22	Conservative	22	Conservative	18
Labour	17	Labour	16	Labour	20
Liberal Democrats	4	Liberal Democrats	4	Liberal Democrats	4
Green	1	Green	1	Green	2
Independent	7	Independent	8	Independent	7

Changes 2023–2024:

- May 2023: Kathy Murphy leaves Labour to sit as an independent

=== Councillors standing down ===
Councillor	Ward	First elected	Party	Date announced
Derek Jarvis	West Shoebury Ward		Conservative	25 March 2024
Chris Walker	Eastwood Park	1997	Conservative	21 October 2021
Steve Buckley	St Laurence	2015	Conservative	
John Lamb	West Leigh		Conservative	
Stephen George	Milton	1999	Labour	
Mike Stafford	Thorpe		Independent	

=== Election result ===
2024 Southend-on-Sea City Council election
Party	This election			Full council			This election		
Party	Seats	Net	Seats %	Other	Total	Total %	Votes	Votes %	+/−
Labour	7	▲4	41.2	13	20	39.2	12,702	31.6	+2.9
Conservative	7	▼4	41.2	11	18	35.3	12,406	30.9	–2.3
Independent	1	▼1	5.9	6	7	13.7	3,572	8.9	–3.4
Liberal Democrats	1	Steady	5.9	3	4	7.8	4,351	10.8	–2.4
Green	1	▲1	5.9	1	2	3.9	5,434	13.5	+4.4
Confelicity	0	Steady	0.0	0	0	0.0	1,307	3.3	+0.4
Heritage	0	Steady	0.0	0	0	0.0	420	1.0	+0.7

== Ward results ==
Results of the City Council election were released by Southend-on-Sea City Council on 3 May 2024.

Seat changes are compared to the 2021 election and do not take into account interim changes due to by-elections or defections.

=== Belfairs ===
Belfairs
Party	Candidate	Votes	%	±%
Conservative	Jack Warren*	1,006	39.2	+5.9
Green	Nathaniel Love	693	27.0	+21.5
Independent	Gareth Evans	419	16.3	N/A
Labour	Graham Main	320	12.5	+1.5
Liberal Democrats	Stephen Cummins	86	3.4	–1.1
Confelicity	Lizzie Smith	32	1.2	+0.4
Majority		313	12.2	N/A
Turnout		2,565	34.9	–1.4
Conservative hold		Swing	▼7.8	

=== Blenheim Park ===
Blenheim Park
Party	Candidate	Votes	%	±%
Labour Co-op	Shahid Nadeem	1,089	40.0	+5.9
Conservative	Helen Boyd*	677	24.9	–2.9
Independent	Keith Evans	561	20.6	–6.8
Green	AJ Sutherland	223	8.2	+1.7
Liberal Democrats	Pamela Austin	103	3.8	+0.6
Heritage	Lynn Smith	28	1.0	N/A
Confelicity	Luis Lancos	26	1.0	–0.1
Majority		412	15.1	+8.8
Turnout		2,722	33.7	+1.8
Labour Co-op gain from Conservative		Swing	▲4.4	

=== Chalkwell ===
Chalkwell
Party	Candidate	Votes	%	±%
Conservative	James Courtenay*	975	40.8	–6.7
Labour	Mike O'Connor	868	36.3	+4.7
Green	James Vessey-Miller	331	13.9	+3.9
Liberal Democrats	Christopher Hind	130	5.4	–2.4
Confelicity	Roma Patel	73	3.05	±0.0
Majority		107	4.5	–11.4
Turnout		2,388	33.7	–0.3
Conservative hold		Swing	▲5.7	

=== Eastwood Park ===
Eastwood Park
Party	Candidate	Votes	%	±%
Liberal Democrats	Dave Poulton	1,419	56.4	–11.3
Conservative	Verina Weaver	762	30.3	+6.6
Labour	Christopher Clarke	193	7.7	+2.7
Green	Lauren Ekins	78	3.1	+1.1
Confelicity	Simon Spooner	53	2.1	+0.6
Majority		657	26.1	–17.9
Turnout		2,517	34.5	–1.4
Liberal Democrats gain from Conservative		Swing	▼9.0	

=== Kursaal ===
Kursaal
Party	Candidate	Votes	%	±%
Labour	Irene Ferguson	846	51.0	–3.9
Conservative	Marco Mann	237	14.3	–7.2
Independent	Kay Mitchell	179	10.8	N/A
Confelicity	Lee Clark	155	9.3	+3.7
Green	Thomas Love	128	7.7	–0.6
Liberal Democrats	Alan Crystall	58	3.5	–1.5
Heritage	Lara Hurley	51	3.1	+0.9
Majority		609	36.7	+3.3
Turnout		1,660	20.8	+0.3
Labour gain from Independent		Swing	▲1.7	

=== Leigh ===
Leigh
Party	Candidate	Votes	%	±%
Green	Stuart Allen	1,725	57.6	+18.5
Liberal Democrats	Jean de Tourtoulon	637	21.3	–10.1
Conservative	Mary Canet-Espi	342	11.4	–7.4
Labour	Malla Reddy Gurram	202	6.7	–1.9
Confelicity	James Miller	80	2.7	+1.3
Majority		1,088	36.3	+28.6
Turnout		2,996	40.9	+4.7
Green gain from Liberal Democrats		Swing	▲14.3	

=== Milton ===
Milton
Party	Candidate	Votes	%	±%
Labour	Sam Allen	1,170	52.1	+1.0
Conservative	Jonathan Garston	540	24.0	–0.2
Green	Sarah-Ann Patel	269	12.0	+2.0
Heritage	Bianca Isherwood	106	4.7	±0.0
Liberal Democrats	Robert Howes	84	3.7	–2.7
Confelicity	Dee Curtis	68	3.0	–0.7
Majority		630	28.1	+1.2
Turnout		2,246	27.0	–0.6
Labour hold		Swing	▲0.6	

=== Prittlewell ===
Prittlewell
Party	Candidate	Votes	%	±%
Conservative	David Garston*	1,032	39.0	–4.6
Labour	Chris Webster	971	36.7	–0.8
Green	RJ Learmouth	220	8.3	+2.8
Independent	Leanne Kelly	170	6.4	N/A
Liberal Democrats	Pierre Craddock	142	5.4	–4.0
Confelicity	Simon Jones	87	3.3	–0.7
Majority		61	2.3	–3.8
Turnout		2,645	33.8	–0.5
Conservative hold		Swing	▼1.9	

=== Shoeburyness ===
Shoeburyness
Party	Candidate	Votes	%	±%
Conservative	Judith McMahon	742	31.5	–3.6
Labour	Kevin Ryan	734	31.1	+14.6
Independent	Tricia Cowdrey	628	26.6	–12.1
Green	Fiona Clapperton	125	5.3	+0.1
Liberal Democrats	Chris Bailey	68	2.9	+0.4
Confelicity	Kayleigh Burgess	47	2.0	±0.0
Majority		8	0.4	N/A
Turnout		2,357	27.6	+0.9
Conservative hold		Swing	▼9.1	

=== Southchurch ===
Southchurch
Party	Candidate	Votes	%	±%
Conservative	Darryl Jones*	1,317	52.2	+0.4
Labour	Carrie Druce	560	27.7	+11.6
Green	Matthew Dallat	162	7.4	+0.4
Confelicity	Dean Harris-Eckett	151	6.9	+2.7
Liberal Democrats	Billy Boulton	102	4.7	+0.6
Heritage	Angela Mozzato	47	2.2	N/A
Majority		757	24.5	–10.5
Turnout		2,178	29.5	–0.3
Conservative hold		Swing	▼5.6	

=== St Laurence ===
St Laurence
Party	Candidate	Votes	%	±%
Labour	Madison Faulkner-Hatt	1,164	50.0	–3.6
Conservative	Samuel Pettengell	790	33.9	–1.7
Liberal Democrats	Kev Malone	148	6.4	+1.3
Green	Simon Gittus	120	5.2	+1.6
Confelicity	Sandy van Deventer	93	4.0	+1.8
Majority		374	16.1	–1.9
Turnout		2,327	29.6	–1.3
Labour gain from Conservative		Swing	▼1.0	

=== St Luke's ===
St Luke's
Party	Candidate	Votes	%	±%
Labour	Jane Norman	911	43.8	–5.0
Conservative	Brian Beggs*	534	25.7	+3.8
Independent	Brian Ayling	212	10.2	–1.3
Green	Tilly Hogrebe	191	9.2	+0.3
Confelicity	Joleen Hills	84	4.0	–1.1
Liberal Democrats	Sara-Jayne Boulton	69	3.3	–0.6
Heritage	Adam Ball	61	2.9	N/A
Majority		377	18.1	–8.7
Turnout		2,081	26.0	+0.9
Labour gain from Conservative		Swing	▼4.4	

=== Thorpe ===
Thorpe
Party	Candidate	Votes	%	±%
Independent	Susan Badger	1,001	35.8	–0.4
Conservative	Gavin Chambers	870	31.1	+2.8
Labour	David Scott	571	20.4	+8.1
Green	Julie Callow	166	5.9	+0.9
Confelicity	Melissa Aylott	69	2.5	+0.6
Liberal Democrats	Katie Kurilecz	54	1.9	–0.1
Heritage	Adam Isherwood	51	1.8	N/A
Majority		131	4.7	–3.2
Turnout		2,797	38.8	–2.3
Independent hold		Swing	▼1.6	

=== Victoria ===
Victoria
Party	Candidate	Votes	%	±%
Labour	Ian Gilbert*	1,109	60.1	+0.5
Conservative	Bernard Arscott	298	16.2	–3.3
Green	Peter Walker	180	9.8	±0.0
Liberal Democrats	Philip Edey	100	5.4	–1.1
Heritage	Sandra Wiseman	76	4.1	N/A
Confelicity	Jonathan Humphreys	61	3.3	–1.4
Majority		811	43.9	+3.8
Turnout		1,844	20.1	+0.3
Labour hold		Swing	▲1.9	

=== West Leigh ===
West Leigh
Party	Candidate	Votes	%	±%
Conservative	Lesley Salter	1,086	37.9	–9.2
Liberal Democrats	Peter Wexham	895	30.7	–3.8
Green	Gemma Deeney	413	14.2	+5.9
Labour	James Morrison	407	14.0	+6.2
Confelicity	Jane Wilkes	96	3.3	+1.0
Majority		191	7.2	–5.4
Turnout		2,912	40.8	+1.6
Conservative hold		Swing	▼2.7	

=== West Shoebury ===
West Shoebury
Party	Candidate	Votes	%	±%
Conservative	James Moyies*	1,002	45.3	–13.1
Labour Co-op	Ian Pope	524	23.7	+3.0
Independent	Barry Godwin	402	18.2	N/A
Green	Lea Williams	147	6.6	–2.0
Liberal Democrats	Granville Stride	70	3.2	–4.3
Confelicity	Robert Cammidge	58	2.6	–2.3
Majority		478	21.6	–16.0
Turnout		2,214	30.2	+0.4
Conservative hold		Swing	▼8.1	

=== Westborough ===
Westborough
Party	Candidate	Votes	%	±%
Labour	Pamela Kinsella	1,063	53.8	–3.1
Conservative	Dr Vel	375	19.0	+0.5
Green	Stephen Jordan	263	13.3	+1.4
Liberal Democrats	Suzanna Edey	186	9.4	+0.8
Confelicity	Noah Hughes	74	3.7	–0.4
Majority		688	34.8	–3.6
Turnout		1,977	25.8	+1.8
Labour hold		Swing	▼1.8	

== Post-election changes ==
=== By-elections ===
==== Kursaal ====
Kursaal by-election: 4 July 2024
Party	Candidate	Votes	%	±%
Labour	Chris Webster	1,718	49.1	–1.9
Conservative	Marco Mann	651	18.6	+4.3
Green	Thomas Love	411	11.7	+4.0
Independent	Kay Mitchell	407	11.6	+0.8
Liberal Democrats	Billy Boulton	198	5.7	+2.2
Heritage	Lara Hurley	115	3.3	+0.2
Majority		1,067	30.5	–6.2
Turnout		3,500	44.8	+24.0
Labour hold		Swing	▼3.1	
