= Southend Confelicity Party =

Southend Confelicity Party Confelicity
- Leader: James Miller
- Membership: 100
- Ideology: Anti-Essex Devolution Localism
- Political position: Big-tent

The Southend Confelicity Party (SCP), also known by its shorter name of Confelicity, is a local political party based in Southend-on-Sea. The group has fielded candidates in a number of local elections.

== Controversy ==
In 2024 a former member and DJ Michael Binder was charged with five sexual offences including children, James Miller and the Confelicity party distanced themselves from Michael Binder.

== Election results ==
=== Southend-on-Sea Council ===
Year	Candidates	Votes	Share of votes	Seats
2022	17	779	1.8%	0 / 51
2023	17	1,159	2.9%	0 / 51
2024	17	1,307	3.3%	0 / 51
2026	17	1,539	2.7%	0 / 51

=== Greater Essex Mayoral elections ===
Year	Candidate	Votes	Share of votes	Place
2028	James Miller	TBD		

=== General elections ===
Year	Candidates	Votes	Share of votes	Seats
2024	2	750	0.0	0 / 51
