= 2026 Southend-on-Sea City Council election =

2026 English local government election

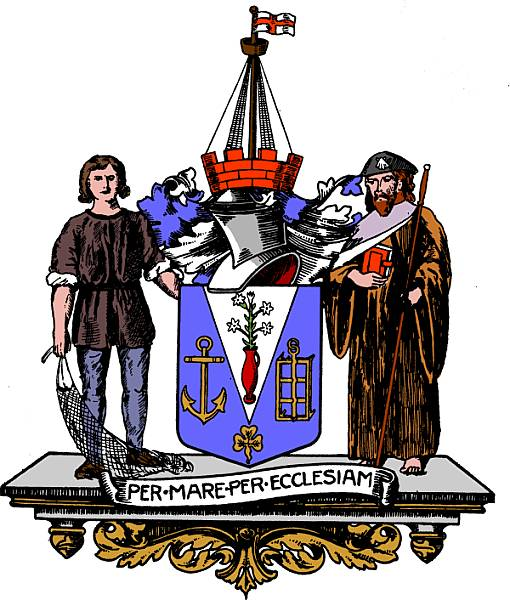
- 7 May 2026

17 out of 51 seats to Southend-on-Sea City Council 26 seats needed for a majority
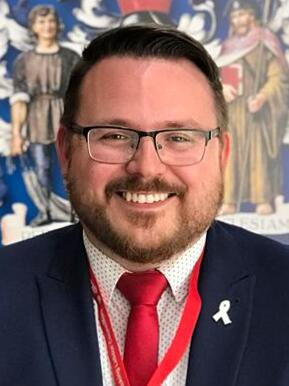

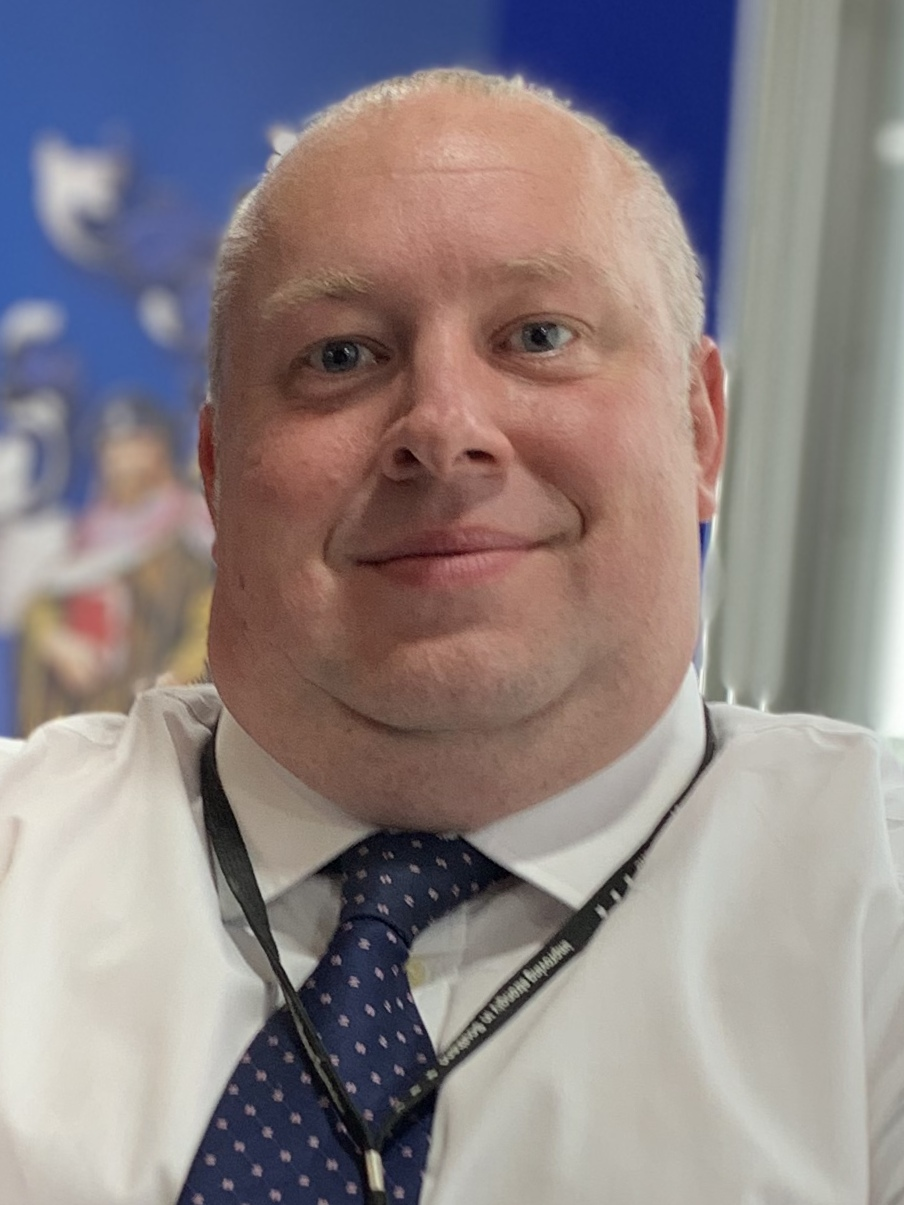

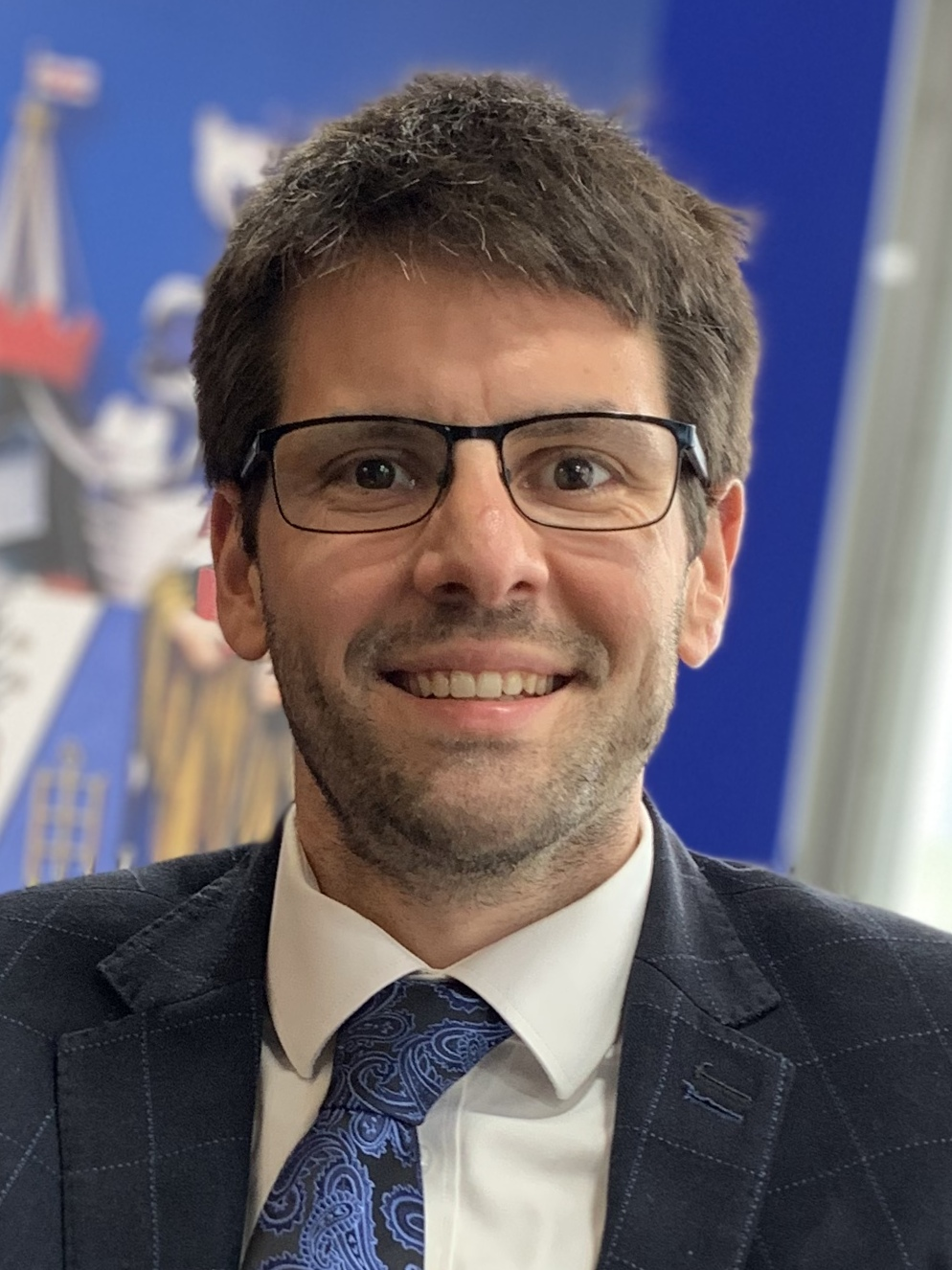

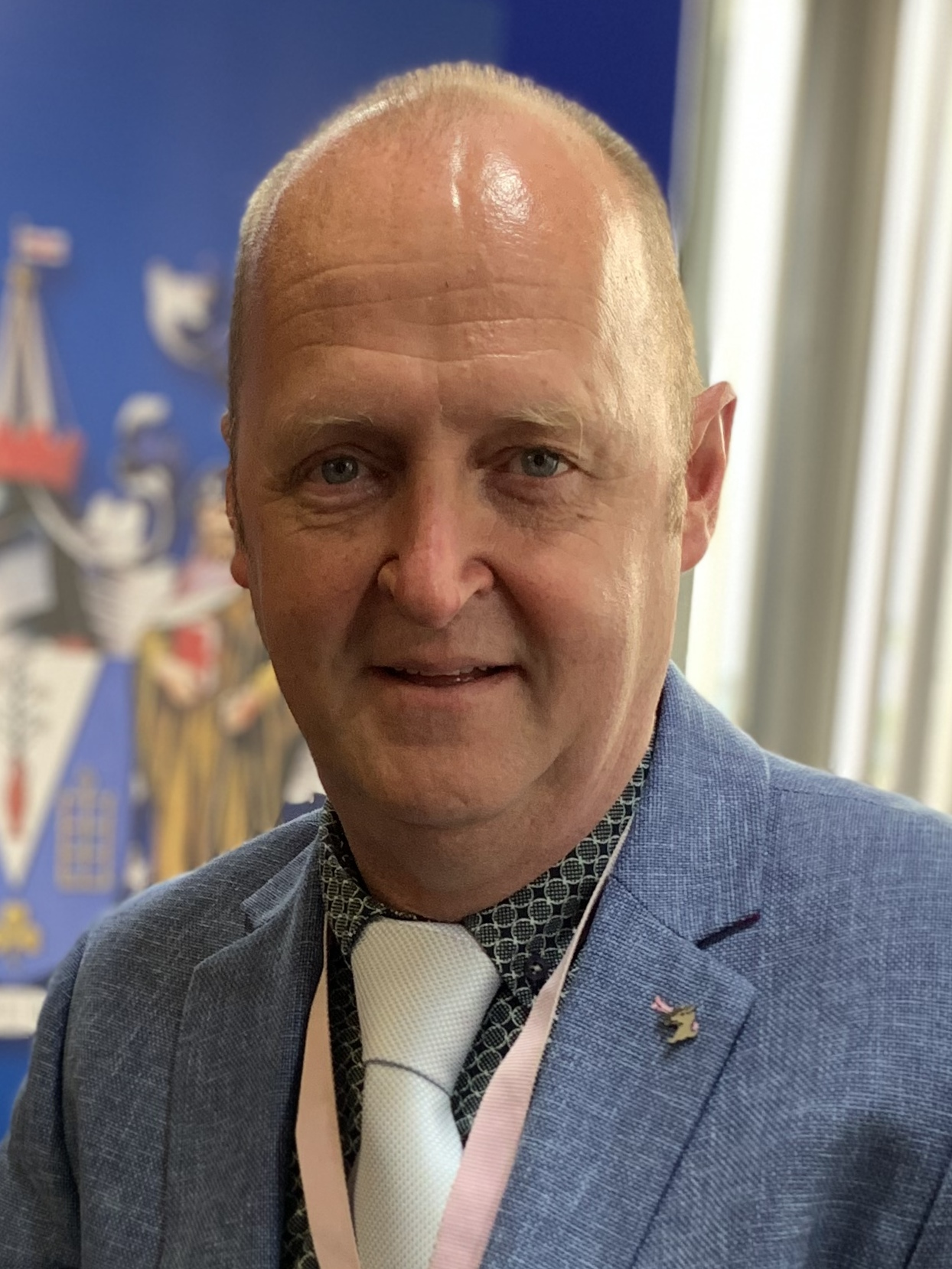

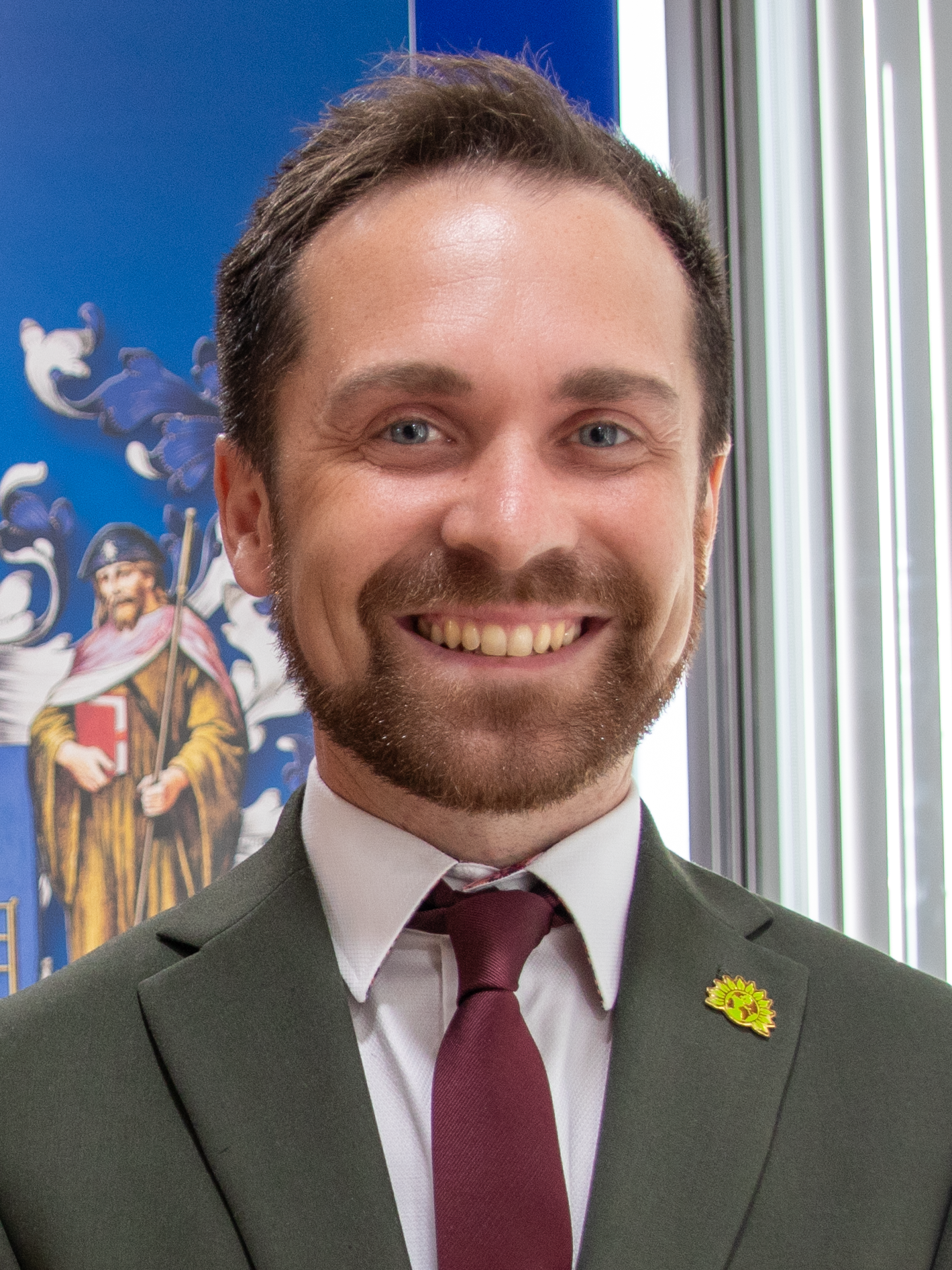

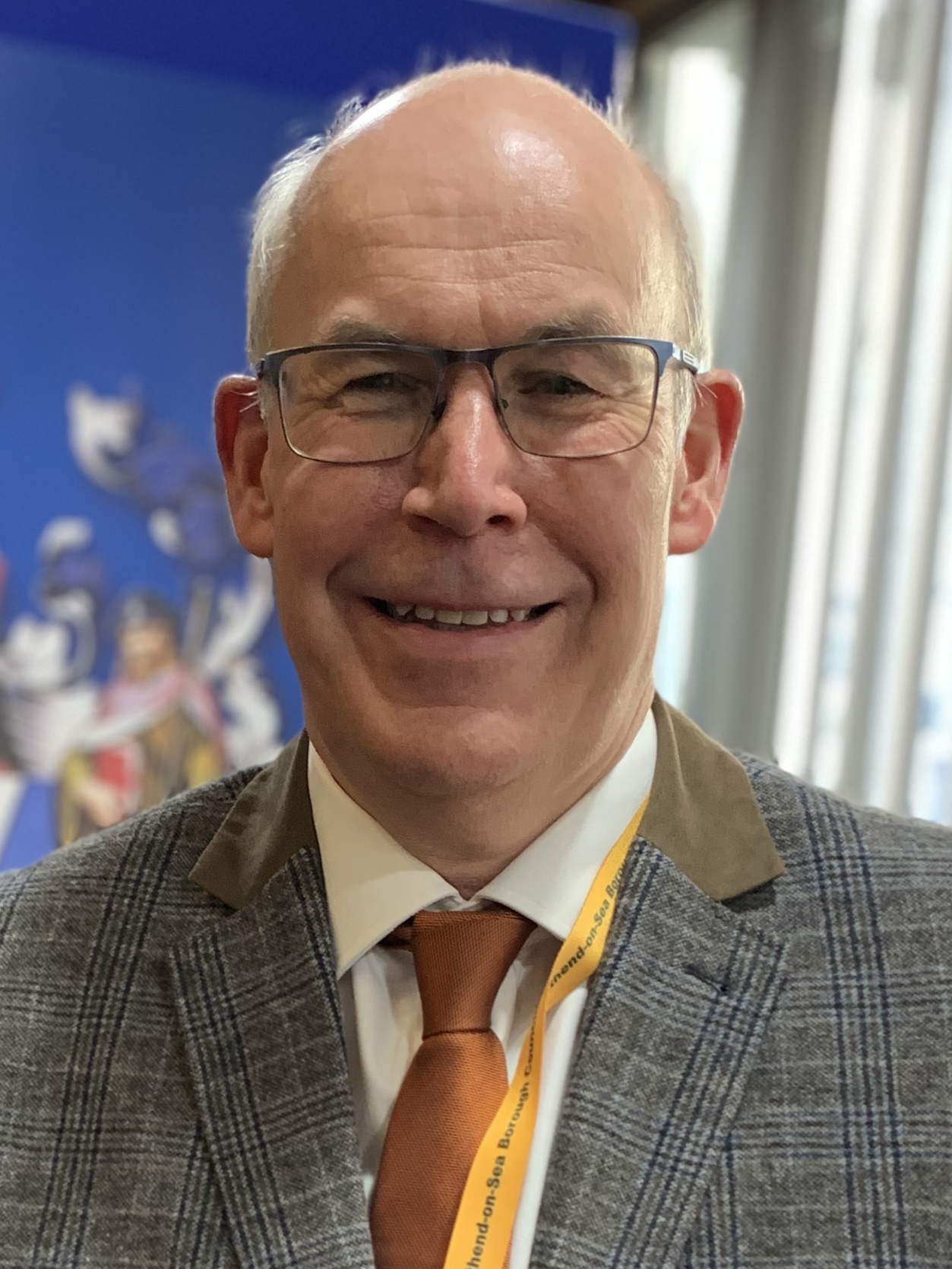
| | First party | Second party | Third party |
|---|---|---|---|
| Leader | Daniel Cowan | Tony Cox | James Courtenay |
| Party | Labour | Reform | Conservative |
| Leader since | 9 May 2023 | 31 August 2024 | 27 August 2024 |
| Leader's seat | St. Laurence | West Shoebury | Chalkwell |
| Last election | 20 seats, 31.6% | Did not stand | 18 seats, 30.9% |
| Seats before | 19 | 4 | 14 |
| Seats won | 4 | 8 | 2 |
| Seats after | 17 | 11 | 11 |
| Seat change | ▼2 | ▲7 | ▼3 |
| Popular vote | 9,204 | 17,671 | 10,456 |
| Percentage | 16.3% | 31.3% | 18.5% |
| Swing | ▼15.3% | N/A | ▼12.4% |
| | Fourth party | Fifth party | Sixth party |
| Leader | Steven Wakefield (Note: Leader and spokesman of the Independent Group, which represents the majority of independent councillors at the time of the election.) | Stuart Allen | Paul Collins |
| Party | Independent | Green | Liberal Democrats |
| Leader since | | 23 May 2025 | 13 May 2023 |
| Leader's seat | Shoeburyness | Leigh | Eastwood Park |
| Last election | 7 seats, 8.9% | 2 seats, 13.5% | 4 seats, 10.8% |
| Seats before | 8 (Note: Of the 8 Independent councillors before the election, 5 sat in the Independent Group, 1 sat in the Green & Progressive group, and 2 were non-aligned.) | 2 (Note: Sit in the Green & Progressive group.) | 4 |
| Seats won | 0 | 2 | 1 |
| Seats after | 5 | 4 | 3 |
| Seat change | ▼3 | ▲2 | ▼1 |
| Popular vote | 3,321 | 9,848 | 4,349 |
| Percentage | 5.9% | 17.4% | 7.7% |
| Swing | ▼3.0% | ▲3.9% | ▼3.1% |
- Winner of each seat at the 2026 Southend-on-Sea City Council election.
Leader before election
Daniel Cowan
Labour
No overall control (Note: Labour–Independent–Liberal Democrat coalition.)
Leader after election
Daniel Cowan
Labour
No overall control (Note: Labour–Independent–Liberal Democrat coalition.)

The 2026 Southend-on-Sea City Council election took place on 7 May 2026 to elect one third of the members of Southend-on-Sea City Council in Essex, England. The election took place on the same day as other local elections across the United Kingdom.

Prior to the election the council was under no overall control, being run by a coalition of Labour, the Liberal Democrats and some of the independent councillors, led by Labour councillor Daniel Cowan. Reform UK won the largest number of seats contested at this election, but the council remained under no overall control and Labour remained the largest party. The Labour, Liberal Democrats and independents coalition continued to run the council after the election, with Daniel Cowan remaining in post as leader of the council.

== Background ==
Elections to Southend-on-Sea City Council are held by thirds. The 2026 election will therefore contest one third of the council’s seats.

The election is taking place during a period of proposed local government reorganisation in Essex, which may replace existing council structures with a smaller number of unitary authorities. As part of this process, some councils were invited by central government to request the postponement of their scheduled 2026 elections.

Southend-on-Sea City Council confirmed that its elections would proceed as scheduled. Under UK law, any decision to postpone local elections is made by central government.

== Summary ==
=== Election result ===
2026 Southend-on-Sea City Council election
| Party | This election | | | | Full council | | | This election | | |
| Party | Candidates | Seats | Net | Seats % | Other | Total | Total % | Votes | Votes % | +/− |
|---|---|---|---|---|---|---|---|---|---|---|
| Labour | {{{candidates}}} | 4 | ▼2 | 23.6 | 13 | 17 | 33.3 | 9,304 | 16.4 | –15.2 |
| Reform | {{{candidates}}} | 8 | ▲7 | 47.1 | 3 | 11 | 21.6 | 17,671 | 31.3 | N/A |
| Conservative | {{{candidates}}} | 2 | ▼3 | 11.8 | 9 | 11 | 21.6 | 10,456 | 18.5 | –12.4 |
| Independent | {{{candidates}}} | 0 | ▼3 | 0.0 | 5 | 5 | 9.9 | 3,321 | 5.9 | –3.0 |
| Green | {{{candidates}}} | 2 | ▲2 | 11.8 | 2 | 4 | 7.9 | 9,848 | 17.4 | +3.9 |
| Liberal Democrats | {{{candidates}}} | 1 | ▼1 | 5.9 | 2 | 3 | 5.9 | 4,349 | 7.7 | –3.1 |
| Confelicity | {{{candidates}}} | 0 | Steady | 0.0 | 0 | 0 | 0.0 | 1,539 | 2.7 | –0.6 |
| Heritage | {{{candidates}}} | 0 | Steady | 0.0 | 0 | 0 | 0.0 | 89 | 0.2 | –0.8 |
| Moon and Serpent | {{{candidates}}} | 0 | Steady | 0.0 | 0 | 0 | 0.0 | 26 | <0.1 | N/A |

== Incumbents ==
| Ward | Incumbent councillor | Party | Re-standing |
|---|---|---|---|
| Belfairs | Alan Dear | Conservative | Yes |
| Blenheim Park | Laurie Burton | Labour | Yes |
| Chalkwell | Nigel Folkard | Conservative | No |
| Eastwood Park | Robert McMullan | Liberal Democrats | Yes |
| Kursaal | Matt Dent | Labour | Yes |
| Leigh | Carole Mulroney | Liberal Democrats | Yes |
| Milton | Maxine Sadza | Labour | Yes |
| Prittlewell | Kevin Buck | Conservative | Yes |
| Shoeburyness | Nick Ward | Independent | Yes |
| Southchurch | Daniel Nelson (Note: Elected as Conservative candidate (3 May 2018 - 5 August 2025). Subsequently represented Reform UK (5 August 2025 - present)) | Reform | No |
| St Laurence | Lydia Hyde | Labour | Yes |
| St Luke's | Kathy Murphy (Note: Elected as Labour candidate (5 May 2022 - 17 May 2024). Subsequently sat as 'Not aligned to a Political Party' (17 May 2024 - present)) | Independent | No |
| Thorpe | Martin Terry | Independent | Yes |
| Victoria | Margaret Borton | Labour | Yes |
| West Leigh | Fay Evans | Conservative | No |
| West Shoebury | John Harland | Conservative | Yes |
| Westborough | Kevin Robinson | Labour | Yes |

== Results by ward ==
Full results are available from Southend-on-Sea City Council.

=== Belfairs ===
| Party | Candidate | Votes | % | ±% |
|---|---|---|---|---|
| Reform | Oscar Wood | 1,280 | 36.3 | N/A |
| Green | Lauren Ekins | 820 | 23.2 | −3.8 |
| Conservative | Alan Dear* | 792 | 22.4 | −16.8 |
| Independent | Gareth Evans | 287 | 8.1 | −8.2 |
| Labour | Szymon Blasiak | 191 | 5.4 | −7.1 |
| Liberal Democrats | Alan Crystall | 144 | 4.1 | +0.7 |
| Confelicity | Nicky Gilbert | 17 | 0.5 | −0.7 |
| Majority | | 460 | 13.1 | N/A |
| Turnout | | 3,531 | 47.9 | +13.0 |
| Registered electors | | ~7,376 | | |
| Reform gain from Conservative | | | | |

=== Blenheim Park ===
Blenheim Park
| Party | Candidate | Votes | % | ±% |
|---|---|---|---|---|
| Reform | Craig Watt | 1,074 | 31.1 | N/A |
| Labour | Laurie Burton* | 866 | 25.0 | −15.0 |
| Conservative | Zhanelya Subebayeva | 545 | 15.8 | −9.1 |
| Green | AJ Sutherland | 454 | 13.1 | +4.9 |
| Independent | Keith Evans | 362 | 10.5 | −10.1 |
| Liberal Democrats | Ian Berry | 108 | 3.1 | −0.7 |
| Confelicity | Ronish Sutariya | 29 | 0.8 | −0.2 |
| Heritage | Lynn Smith | 20 | 0.6 | −0.4 |
| Majority | | 208 | 6.1 | N/A |
| Turnout | | 3,458 | 43.7 | +10.0 |
| Registered electors | | ~7,922 | | |
| Reform gain from Labour | | | | |

=== Chalkwell ===
| Party | Candidate | Votes | % | ±% |
|---|---|---|---|---|
| Green | Kay Mitchell | 1,024 | 31.5 | +17.6 |
| Conservative | Julie Cushion | 967 | 29.8 | −11.0 |
| Reform | Ali Brown | 777 | 23.9 | +23.9 |
| Labour | David Scott | 384 | 8.7 | −27.6 |
| Liberal Democrats | Christopher Hind | 133 | 4.1 | −1.3 |
| Confelicity | Rob Cammidge | 61 | 1.9 | −1.2 |
| Majority | | 57 | 1.7 | N/A |
| Turnout | | 3,346 | 47.7 | +14.0 |
| Registered electors | | ~7,012 | | |
| Green gain from Conservative | | Swing | ▲14.3 | |

=== Eastwood Park ===
| Party | Candidate | Votes | % | ±% |
|---|---|---|---|---|
| Liberal Democrats | Rob McMullan* | 1,717 | 48.5 | −7.9 |
| Reform | Roger Weaver | 1,257 | 35.5 | N/A |
| Conservative | Edward Firth | 319 | 9.0 | −21.3 |
| Green | James Vessey-Miller | 134 | 3.8 | +0.7 |
| Labour | Timothy MacGregor | 93 | 2.6 | −5.1 |
| Confelicity | Simon Spooner | 18 | 0.5 | −1.6 |
| Majority | | 460 | 13.0 | –13.1 |
| Turnout | | 3,538 | 48.8 | +14.3 |
| Registered electors | | ~7,257 | | |
| Liberal Democrats hold | | | | |

=== Kursaal ===
| Party | Candidate | Votes | % | ±% |
|---|---|---|---|---|
| Labour Co-op | Matt Dent* | 849 | 32.9 | −18.1 |
| Reform | Richard Felton | 748 | 29.0 | N/A |
| Confelicity | Lee Clark | 380 | 14.7 | +5.4 |
| Green | Faye Heffernan | 360 | 13.9 | +6.2 |
| Conservative | Liam Mannix | 161 | 6.2 | −8.1 |
| Liberal Democrats | Billy Boulton | 69 | 2.7 | −0.8 |
| Heritage | Lara Hurley | 15 | 0.6 | −2.5 |
| Majority | | 101 | 3.9 | –32.8 |
| Turnout | | 2,582 | 32.3 | +11.5 |
| Registered electors | | ~8,004 | | |
| Labour Co-op hold | | | | |

=== Leigh ===
| Party | Candidate | Votes | % | ±% |
|---|---|---|---|---|
| Green | Anita Forde | 1,301 | 35.8 | −21.8 |
| Liberal Democrats | Carole Mulroney* | 772 | 21.2 | −0.1 |
| Reform | Paul Thurgood | 767 | 21.1 | N/A |
| Conservative | Freddie Russell | 325 | 8.9 | −2.5 |
| Independent | Enzo Harrison | 287 | 7.9 | N/A |
| Labour | Ian Belfield | 164 | 4.5 | −2.2 |
| Confelicity | Liam Brittle | 17 | 0.5 | −2.2 |
| Majority | | 529 | 14.6 | –21.7 |
| Turnout | | 3,633 | 49.1 | +8.2 |
| Registered electors | | ~7,395 | | |
| Green gain from Liberal Democrats | | Swing | ▼10.9 | |

=== Milton ===
Milton
| Party | Candidate | Votes | % | ±% |
|---|---|---|---|---|
| Labour Co-op | Maxine Sadza* | 938 | 30.2 | −21.9 |
| Reform | Aaron Lyons | 862 | 27.8 | N/A |
| Green | Sarah-Ann Jardine | 741 | 23.9 | +11.9 |
| Conservative | Jonathan Hoffman | 354 | 11.4 | −12.6 |
| Liberal Democrats | Robert Howes | 133 | 4.3 | +0.6 |
| Heritage | Bianca Isherwood | 38 | 1.2 | −3.5 |
| Confelicity | Sandy Van Deventer | 36 | 1.2 | −1.8 |
| Majority | | 76 | 2.4 | –25.7 |
| Turnout | | 3,102 | 37.4 | +10.4 |
| Registered electors | | ~8,305 | | |
| Labour Co-op hold | | | | |

=== Prittlewell ===
| Party | Candidate | Votes | % | ±% |
|---|---|---|---|---|
| Reform | Michael Heaver | 1,091 | 31.8 | N/A |
| Conservative | Kevin Buck* | 981 | 28.6 | −10.4 |
| Labour Co-op | Malla Gurram | 642 | 18.7 | −18.0 |
| Green | RJ Learmouth | 491 | 14.3 | +6.0 |
| Liberal Democrats | Jane Travers | 163 | 4.7 | −0.7 |
| Confelicity | Elizabeth Smith | 65 | 1.9 | −1.4 |
| Majority | | 110 | 3.2 | N/A |
| Turnout | | 3,433 | 43.9 | +10.1 |
| Registered electors | | ~7,829 | | |
| Reform gain from Conservative | | | | |

=== Shoeburyness ===
| Party | Candidate | Votes | % | ±% |
|---|---|---|---|---|
| Reform | Alex Moyies | 1,319 | 40.1 | N/A |
| Independent | Nick Ward* | 704 | 21.4 | −4.0 |
| Green | Tricia Cowdrey | 485 | 14.8 | +9.5 |
| Conservative | River Jude | 362 | 11.0 | −20.5 |
| Labour | Gabrielle Burt | 235 | 7.2 | −23.9 |
| Liberal Democrats | Samantha Bax | 85 | 2.6 | −0.3 |
| Confelicity | Kayleigh Burgess | 58 | 1.8 | −0.2 |
| Independent | James Quail | 38 | 1.2 | −4.0 |
| Majority | | 615 | 18.7 | N/A |
| Turnout | | 3,286 | 38.5 | +10.9 |
| Registered electors | | ~8,540 | | |
| Reform gain from Independent | | | | |

=== Southchurch ===
| Party | Candidate | Votes | % | ±% |
|---|---|---|---|---|
| Conservative | Martin Bright | 1,465 | 43.9 | −8.3 |
| Reform | Peter Little | 990 | 29.7 | N/A |
| Green | Eva Mansfield | 328 | 9.8 | +2.4 |
| Labour | Nathan Pickering | 295 | 8.8 | −18.9 |
| Confelicity | James Miller | 180 | 5.4 | −1.5 |
| Liberal Democrats | Michael Trace | 80 | 2.4 | −2.3 |
| Majority | | 475 | 14.2 | –10.3 |
| Turnout | | 3,338 | 44.9 | +15.4 |
| Registered electors | | ~7,439 | | |
| Conservative gain from Reform | | | | |

=== St Laurence ===
St Laurence
| Party | Candidate | Votes | % | ±% |
|---|---|---|---|---|
| Reform | Frankie Bird | 1,418 | 41.0 | N/A |
| Labour Co-op | Lydia Hyde* | 1,092 | 31.6 | −18.4 |
| Conservative | Judith Canham | 418 | 12.1 | −21.8 |
| Green | Gemma Deeney | 284 | 8.2 | +3.0 |
| Liberal Democrats | Kev Malone | 140 | 4.0 | −2.4 |
| Confelicity | Karl Lansley | 108 | 3.1 | −0.9 |
| Majority | | 326 | 9.4 | N/A |
| Turnout | | 3,460 | 43.8 | +14.2 |
| Registered electors | | ~7,909 | | |
| Reform gain from Labour Co-op | | | | |

=== St Luke's ===
| Party | Candidate | Votes | % | ±% |
|---|---|---|---|---|
| Reform | James O'Rourke | 1,212 | 38.1 | N/A |
| Labour | James Morrison | 817 | 25.7 | −18.1 |
| Green | Tilly Hogrebe | 463 | 14.6 | +5.4 |
| Conservative | Kenneth Davidson | 332 | 10.4 | −15.3 |
| Independent | Brian Ayling | 178 | 5.6 | −4.6 |
| Confelicity | Jamie Chapman | 95 | 3.0 | −1.0 |
| Liberal Democrats | Kranthi Sajja | 56 | 1.8 | −1.5 |
| Moon and Serpent | Jason Pilley | 26 | 0.8 | N/A |
| Majority | | 395 | 12.4 | N/A |
| Turnout | | 3,179 | 39.8 | +13.8 |
| Registered electors | | ~7,979 | | |
| Reform gain from Independent | | | | |

=== Thorpe ===
| Party | Candidate | Votes | % | ±% |
|---|---|---|---|---|
| Reform | John Corrigan | 1,241 | 33.1 | N/A |
| Independent | Martin Terry* | 995 | 26.6 | −9.2 |
| Conservative | Connor Winter | 624 | 16.7 | −14.4 |
| Green | Maria Heffernan | 318 | 8.5 | +2.6 |
| Labour | Robert Clemenson | 281 | 7.5 | −12.9 |
| Confelicity | Diane Sossou | 200 | 5.3 | +2.8 |
| Liberal Democrats | Katie Kurilecz | 69 | 1.8 | −0.1 |
| Heritage | Adam Isherwood | 16 | 0.4 | −1.4 |
| Majority | | 246 | 6.5 | N/A |
| Turnout | | 3,744 | 52.3 | +13.5 |
| Registered electors | | ~7,161 | | |
| Reform gain from Independent | | | | |

=== Victoria ===
| Party | Candidate | Votes | % | ±% |
|---|---|---|---|---|
| Labour | Margaret Borton* | 936 | 34.5 | −25.6 |
| Reform | Carl Whitwell | 799 | 29.4 | N/A |
| Green | Peter Walker | 596 | 22.0 | +12.2 |
| Conservative | Malik Smith | 216 | 8.0 | −8.2 |
| Liberal Democrats | Phil Edey | 93 | 3.4 | −2.0 |
| Confelicity | Jolene Hills | 74 | 2.7 | −0.6 |
| Majority | | 137 | 5.1 | –38.8 |
| Turnout | | 2,714 | 30.0 | +9.9 |
| Registered electors | | ~9,038 | | |
| Labour hold | | | | |

=== West Leigh ===
West Leigh
| Party | Candidate | Votes | % | ±% |
|---|---|---|---|---|
| Conservative | Alexander Shaw | 1,510 | 37.5 | −0.4 |
| Green | Simon Gittus | 1,034 | 25.7 | +11.5 |
| Reform | Verina Weaver | 866 | 21.5 | N/A |
| Liberal Democrats | Stephen Cummins | 336 | 8.3 | −22.4 |
| Labour | Sekky Adams | 179 | 4.4 | −9.6 |
| Confelicity | Helen Symmons | 105 | 2.6 | −0.7 |
| Majority | | 476 | 11.8 | +4.6 |
| Turnout | | 4,030 | 56.7 | +15.9 |
| Registered electors | | ~7,121 | | |
| Conservative hold | | Swing | ▼6.0 | |

=== West Shoebury ===
| Party | Candidate | Votes | % | ±% |
|---|---|---|---|---|
| Reform | Steve Harvey | 1,201 | 37.4 | N/A |
| Conservative | John Harland* | 846 | 26.3 | −19.0 |
| Green | Joseph Grant | 371 | 11.5 | +4.9 |
| Labour | Brian Jones | 351 | 10.9 | −12.8 |
| Independent | Brian Beggs | 282 | 8.8 | −9.4 |
| Liberal Democrats | John Batch | 108 | 3.4 | +0.2 |
| Confelicity | Simon Jones | 55 | 1.7 | −0.9 |
| Majority | | 355 | 11.1 | N/A |
| Turnout | | 3,214 | 44.2 | +14.0 |
| Registered electors | | ~7,276 | | |
| Reform gain from Conservative | | | | |

=== Westborough ===
| Party | Candidate | Votes | % | ±% |
|---|---|---|---|---|
| Labour | Kevin Robinson* | 991 | 32.9 | −20.9 |
| Reform | Ben Aldridge | 769 | 25.5 | N/A |
| Green | Stephen Jordan | 644 | 21.4 | +8.1 |
| Conservative | Colin Hicks | 239 | 7.9 | −11.1 |
| Independent | Amy Heathcote | 161 | 5.3 | +6.2 |
| Liberal Democrats | Suzanna Edey | 143 | 4.7 | −4.7 |
| Confelicity | Melissa Aylott | 41 | 1.4 | −2.3 |
| Independent | Gary Kandinsky | 27 | 0.9 | +6.2 |
| Majority | | 222 | 7.4 | –27.4 |
| Turnout | | 3,015 | 39.1 | +13.3 |
| Registered electors | | ~7,705 | | |
| Labour hold | | | | |

== Post-election changes ==
=== Leigh by-election ===
Leigh by-election: 10 December 2026
| Party | Candidate | Votes | % | ±% |
|---|---|---|---|---|
| Liberal Democrats | Stephen Cummins | | | |
| Conservative | Paul Gilson | | | |
| Green | Simon Gittus | | | |
| Labour | Lydia Hyde | | | |
| Majority | | | | |
| Turnout | | | | |
| | | Swing | | |
