= Southend-on-Sea City Council =

Local authority of Southend-on-Sea, Essex, England

Type
- Type: Unitary authority

Leadership
- Mayor: Tony Cox, Reform UK since 14 May 2026
- Leader: Daniel Cowan, Labour since 20 May 2024
- Chief Executive: Colin Ansell since 5 February 2024

Structure
- Seats: 51 councillors
- Political groups: Administration (23) Labour (17) Liberal Democrats (3) Independent (3) Other parties (28) Conservative (11) Reform UK (11) Green (4) Independent (2)

Elections
- Voting system: First-past-the-post
- Last election: 7 May 2026
- Next election: 6 May 2027

Meeting place
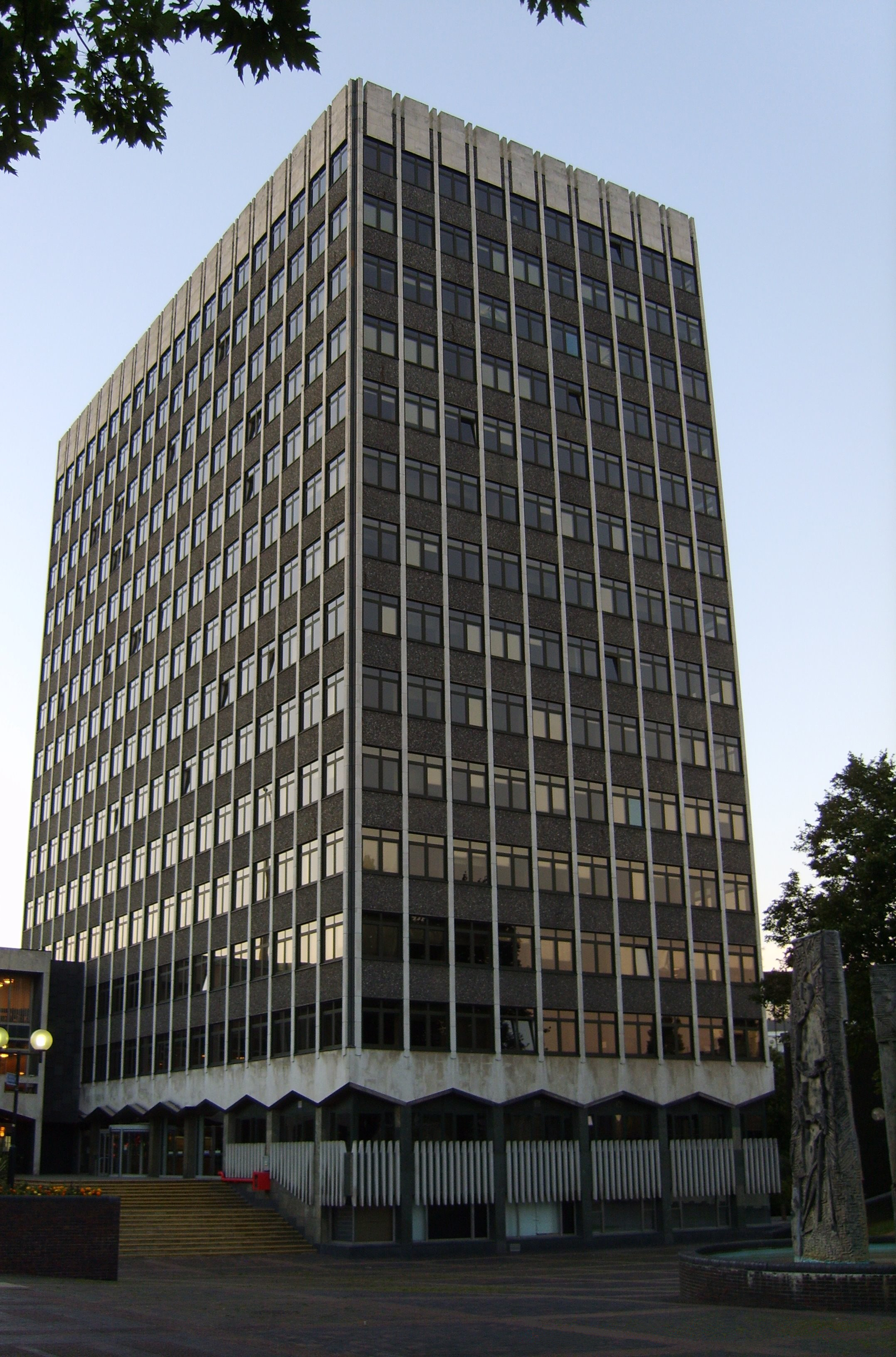
- Civic Centre, Victoria Avenue, Southend-on-Sea, SS2 6ER

Website
- www.southend.gov.uk

Southend-on-Sea City Council is the local authority of the city of Southend-on-Sea, in the ceremonial county of Essex, England. Southend has had an elected local authority since 1866, which has been reformed several times. Since 1998 the council has been a unitary authority, being a district council which also performs the functions of a county council; it is independent from Essex County Council.

The council has been under no overall control since 2019. Since 2024 it has been led by a coalition of Labour, the Liberal Democrats and some of the independent councillors. It is based at Southend Civic Centre.

== History ==
Southend's first elected council was a local board, which held its first meeting on 29 August 1866. Prior to that the town was administered by the vestry for the wider parish of Prittlewell. The local board district was enlarged in 1877 to cover the whole parish of Prittlewell.

In 1892 the town was made a municipal borough, governed by a body formally called the 'mayor, aldermen and burgesses of the borough of Southend-on-Sea', generally known as the corporation, town council or borough council. The borough boundaries were enlarged on several occasions, notably absorbing Southchurch in 1897, Leigh-on-Sea in 1913, and Shoeburyness, North Shoebury and Eastwood in 1933. By 1914 the borough was considered large enough to provide its own county-level functions, and so it was made a county borough, independent from Essex County Council.

The powers of the council were substantially reformed in 1974 under the Local Government Act 1972. Southend's boundaries remained the same, but it was redesignated as a non-metropolitan district, with Essex County Council once more providing county-level services. Southend retained its borough status, allowing the chair of the council to take the title of mayor, continuing Southend's series of mayors dating back to 1892.

Southend regained its independence from Essex County Council on 1 April 1998 when it was made a unitary authority. The way this change was implemented was to create a new non-metropolitan county called Southend-on-Sea covering the same area as the district, but with no separate county council. Instead, the existing borough council assumed the functions that legislation assigns to county councils, making it a unitary authority. This therefore had the effect of restoring the borough council to the powers it had held when Southend was a county borough prior to 1974. Southend-on-Sea remains part of the ceremonial county of Essex for the purposes of lieutenancy.

On 26 January 2022 letters patent were issued granting city status to the borough, allowing the council to change its name to Southend-on-Sea City Council.

In March 2026, the government announced that it would abolish the council in 2028 as part of local government reform across Essex. These proposals were withdrawn in September 2026.

== Governance ==
Southend-on-Sea City Council provides both district-level and county-level functions. There is one civil parish within the city at Leigh-on-Sea, which forms an additional tier of local government for that area; the rest of the city is unparished.

=== Political control ===
The council has been under no overall control since 2019. Following the 2024 election a coalition of Labour, the Liberal Democrats and some of the independent councillors was formed to run the council, led by Labour councillor Daniel Cowan. The same coalition continued to run the council following the 2026 election.

Political control of the council since the 1974 reforms has been as follows:

Lower-tier non-metropolitan district

Party in control	Years
No overall control	1974–1976
Conservative	1976–1987
No overall control	1987–1990
Conservative	1990–1994
No overall control	1994–1998

Unitary authority

Party in control	Years
No overall control	1998–2000
Conservative	2000–2012
No overall control	2012–2013
Conservative	2013–2014
No overall control	2014–2017
Conservative	2017–2019
No overall control	2019–present

=== Leadership ===
The role of mayor is largely ceremonial in Southend-on-Sea, usually being held by a different councillor each year. Political leadership is instead provided by the leader of the council. The leaders since 2003 have been:

Councillor	Party	From	To
Charles Latham	Conservative		20 Feb 2003
Howard Briggs	Conservative	20 Feb 2003	12 May 2005
Anna Waite	Conservative	12 May 2005	May 2006
Murray Foster	Conservative	18 May 2006	May 2007
Nigel Holdcroft	Conservative	17 May 2007	May 2014
Ron Woodley	Independent	5 Jun 2014	May 2016
John Lamb	Conservative	19 May 2016	9 May 2019
Tony Cox	Conservative	9 May 2019	3 Jun 2019
Ian Gilbert	Labour	3 Jun 2019	May 2022
Stephen George	Labour	19 May 2022	18 May 2023
Tony Cox	Conservative	18 May 2023	20 May 2024
Daniel Cowan	Labour	20 May 2024	

=== Composition ===
Following the 2026 election, the composition of the council was:

Party	Councillors
Labour	17
Conservative	11
Reform	11
Green	4
Liberal Democrats	3
Independent	5
Total	51

Three of the independent councillors sit together as the "Rochford and Southend East Independents Group", which forms the council's administration with Labour and the Liberal Democrats. The other two independent councillors are not aligned to any group.

== Elections ==
Since the last boundary changes in 2001, the council has comprised 51 councillors representing 17 wards, with each ward electing three councillors. Elections are held three years out of every four, with a third of the council (one councillor for each ward) elected each time for a four-year term of office. The next election in 2026 will be held under new boundaries.

== Premises ==
The council is based at Southend Civic Centre on Victoria Avenue. The building was designed by borough architect, Patrick Burridge, and officially opened by Queen Elizabeth The Queen Mother on 31 October 1967.

== Performance ==
In 2007, Southend Borough Council was criticised as one of the worst financially managed local authorities in England by the Audit Commission report for 2006/7, one of three to gain only one of four stars, the others being Liverpool and the Isles of Scilly.

In March 2012, Southend Borough Council was awarded the title of 'Council of the Year 2012' by the Local Government Chronicle.

== Arms ==
Coat of arms of Southend-on-Sea City Council
Notes Originally granted to Southend-on-Sea County Borough Council on 1 & 2 January 1915. Transferred to Southend-on-Sea Borough Council on 21 May 1974. Crest Issuant out of a mural crown Gules the mast of a ship proper flying therefrom a flag Argent charged with a cross throughout Gules. Escutcheon Azure on a pile Argent between on the dexter an anchor erect on the sinister a grid-iron and in base a trefoil slipped Or a flower vase issuing therefrom a spray of lilies Proper. Supporters On the dexter side a mediaeval fisherman holding a net with his exterior hand all Proper and on the sinister side a Cluniac monk Proper holding in the dexter hand a book Gules and in the exterior hand a staff also Proper. Motto Per Mare Per Ecclesiam (Through The Sea Through The Church)

Awards and achievements
Preceded by Blackburn with Darwen	LGC Council of the Year; 2012	Succeeded by Greenwich
